= Jacques Rivette filmography =

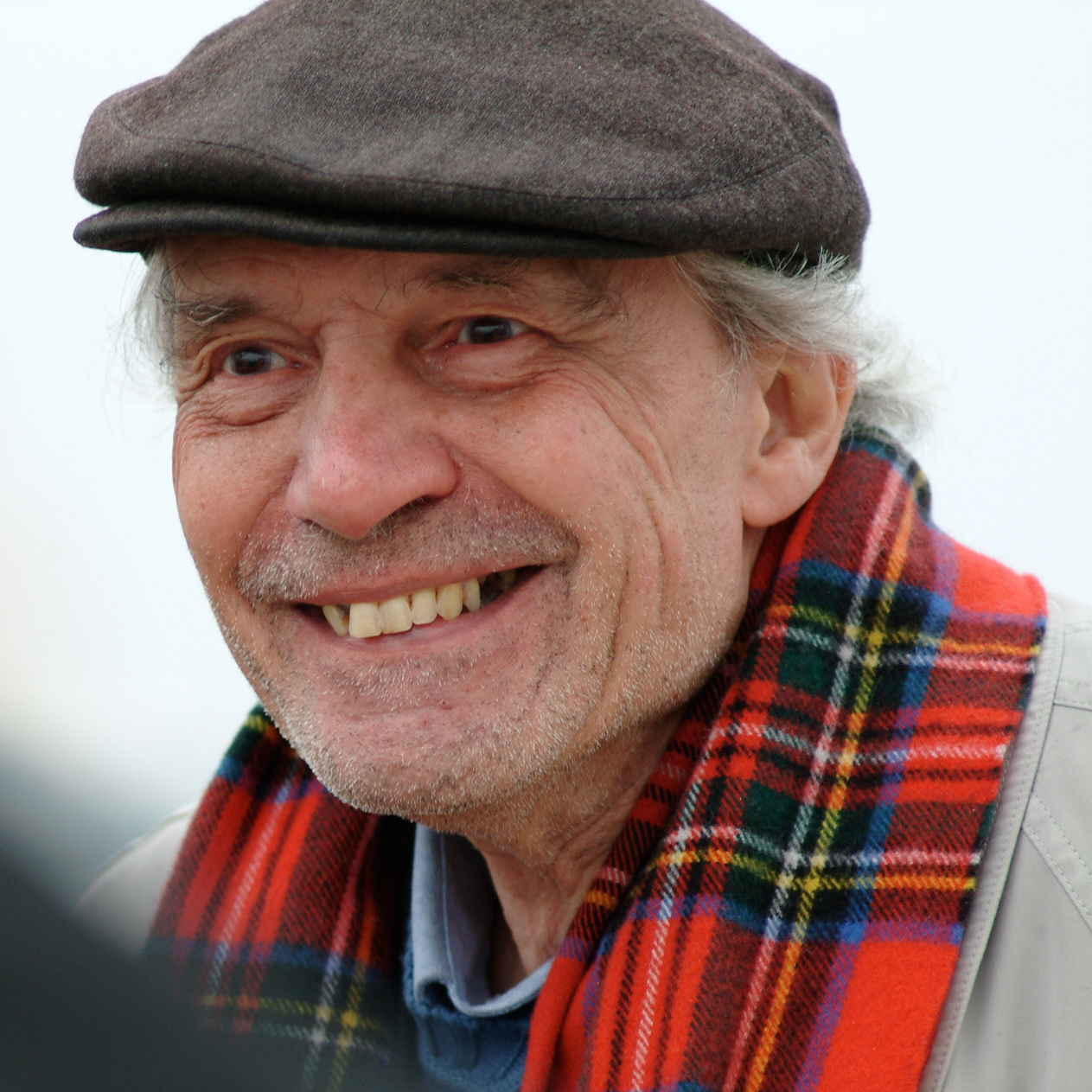
Rivette in 2006

Jacques Rivette (French: [ʒak ʁivɛt]; 1 March 1928 – 29 January 2016) was a French film director, screenwriter and film critic. He wrote and directed twenty feature films, including the two-part Joan the Maiden, eight short films and a three-part television documentary. He also acted in small roles and participated in documentaries. After making his first short film, Aux quatre coins, in his hometown of Rouen, Rivette moved to Paris in 1949 to pursue a career in filmmaking. While attending film screenings at Henri Langlois' Cinémathèque Française and other ciné-clubs he gradually befriended many future members of the French New Wave, including François Truffaut, Jean-Luc Godard, Éric Rohmer and Claude Chabrol. Rivette's association with this group of young cinephiles led to the start of both his filmmaking career and his work in film criticism. In collaboration with his new friends, Rivette made two more short films and worked as a cinematographer and editor on films by Rohmer and Truffaut. He also worked in small roles and as an assistant director to Jean Renoir on French Cancan and Jacques Becker on Ali Baba and the Forty Thieves. During this period he began writing film criticism for the magazine Gazette du Cinéma and later Cahiers du Cinéma, and was one of the most respected writers by his peers.

In 1956 Rivette made the short film Le Coup du Berger, which Truffaut credited as enacting the New Wave movement. The following year he began work on his first feature film with the initial support of Italian neorealist director Roberto Rossellini. Paris Belongs to Us was shot in the summer of 1958, but not released theatrically until 1961, after Chabrol, Truffaut and Godard had their feature-film debuts distributed and made the New Wave renowned worldwide. After staging a theatrical version of Denis Diderot's novel La Religieuse starring Anna Karina in 1963, Rivette became the editor-in-chief of Cahiers du Cinéma until 1965. He then began production on a film version of La Religieuse, which led to a lengthy public battle with French censorship over the film's release. Finally released in 1967, the publicity made it financially successful.

Rivette was unhappy with La Religieuse and re-evaluated his career, developing a unique cinematic style with L'Amour fou. Influenced by the political turmoil of May 1968, improvisational theater and an in-depth interview with Jean Renoir, Rivette began working with large groups of actors on character development and allowing events to unfold on camera. This technique led to the thirteen-hour Out 1. His films of the 1970s, such as Celine and Julie Go Boating, often incorporated fantasy and were better-regarded. After attempting to make four consecutive films, however, Rivette had a nervous breakdown and his career slowed for several years, with films such as Merry-Go-Round and Le Pont du Nord being difficult productions.

During the early 1980s, he began a business partnership with producer Martine Marignac, who produced all his subsequent films. Rivette's output increased from then on, with films such as Gang of Four and La Belle Noiseuse receiving international praise. He continued making films until 2009, retiring after the early symptoms of Alzheimer's disease made the production of 36 vues du pic Saint-Loup too difficult for him to continue. Many of his films are known for their long running time, including the 760-minute Out 1. Almost always at the insistence of the distributors, Rivette edited shorter versions of five of his films and considered some of them to be entirely new films with different meanings.

== Films ==
=== Feature films ===
Year	Title	Original title	Duration (mins)	Awards	Notes	Ref.
1961	Paris Belongs to Us	Paris nous appartient	141	Sutherland Trophy	Made 1957 to 1959.	
1966	The Nun	La Religieuse	140		Filming began in 1965	
1969	Mad Love	L'Amour fou	252	Sutherland Trophy	Alternative version: 120 minutes	
1971	Out 1: Don't Touch Me	Out 1: Noli me tangere	760		Official alternate version: Out 1: Spectre (1974; 260 minutes). "Restored" version of Out 1: Noli me tangere (2006; 750 minutes)	
1974	Celine and Julie Go Boating	Céline et Julie vont en bateau	193	Special Prize of the Jury at the Locarno International Film Festival		
1976	Duelle	Duelle (une quarantaine)	120		Part 2: Scènes de la vie parallèle / Les Filles du Feu (Scenes of a Parallel Life / Girls of Fire)	
1976	Noroît	Noroît (une vengeance)	130		Part 3: Scènes de la vie parallèle / Les Filles du Feu (Scenes of a Parallel Life / Girls of Fire); Not theatrically released	
1980	Merry-Go-Round	Merry-Go-Round	155		Filming began in 1977, post-production was completed in 1981	
1981	Le Pont du Nord	Le Pont du Nord	127			
1984	Love on the Ground	L'amour par terre	170		Alternative version: 120 minutes	
1985	Wuthering Heights	Hurlevent	130			
1989	Gang of Four	La Bande des quatre	160	FIPRESCI Award and Honorable Mention at the 39th Berlin International Film Festival		
1991	La Belle Noiseuse	La Belle Noiseuse	240	Grand Prize of the Jury and Special Mention Prize of the Ecumenical Jury at the Cannes Film Festival; Best Foreign Film from the Kinema Junpo Awards; Prix Méliès from the French Syndicate of Cinema Critics; Best Foreign Film from the Los Angeles Film Critics Association Awards	Official alternate version: La Belle Noiseuse: Divertimento (1991; 120 minutes)	
1994	Joan the Maiden	Jeanne la Pucelle	335		Joan the Maiden, Part 1: The Battles (160 minutes), Joan the Maiden, Part 2: The Prisons (175 minutes)	
1995	Up, Down, Fragile	Haut bas fragile	170			
1998	Top Secret	Secret défense	170			
2001	Who Knows?	Va savoir	154	Best Foreign Film at the Turia Awards; Jury Special Prize at the Valladolid International Film Festival	Original director's cut: Va savoir+ (2002; 220 minutes)	
2003	The Story of Marie and Julien	Histoire de Marie et Julien	151		Unofficially Part 1: Scènes de la vie parallèle / Les Filles du Feu (Scenes of a Parallel Life / Girls of Fire)	
2007	The Duchess of Langeais	Ne touchez pas la hache	137			
2009	Around a Small Mountain	36 vues du Pic Saint-Loup	84			

=== Short films and television work ===
Year	Title	Original title	Length	Notes	Ref.
1949	At the Four Corners	Aux quatre coins	20 minutes	Previously believed to be lost, rediscovered in 2016	
1950	The Quadrille	Le quadrille	40 minutes	Previously believed to be lost, rediscovered in 2016	
1952	The Diversion	Le divertissement	40 minutes	Previously believed to be lost, rediscovered in 2016	
1956	Fool's Mate	Le Coup du berger	28 minutes		
1966	Portrait of Michel Simon by Jean Renoir or Portrait of Jean Renoir by Michel Simon or The direction of actors: dialogue	Portrait de Michel Simon par Jean Renoir ou Portrait de Jean Renoir par Michel Simon ou La direction d'acteurs: dialogue	97 minutes	Episode from the TV series Cinéastes de notre temps	
1967	Jean Renoir, The Master, Parts 1–3	Jean Renoir, le patron	266 minutes	Three episodes from the TV series Cinéastes de notre temps: La recherché du relatif, La direction d'acteurs and La regle et l'exception	
1973	Essai sur l'agression	Essai sur l'agression	23 minutes		
1974	Birth and Death of Prometheus	Naissance et mort de Prométhée	41 minutes		
1981	Paris Goes Away	Paris s'en va	30 minutes	Short film made as a "rehearsal" for Le Pont du Nord from outtakes, alternate takes, and extra footage	
1995	One of Ninon's Adventures	"Paris" Segment	52 seconds	Part of the omnibus film Lumiere and Company	

=== Other work ===
Year	Title	Director	Role	Notes	Ref.
1950	Le Château de verre	René Clément	Actor	Rivette and Godard appear as extras approximately 47 minutes into the film	
1952	Les Petites filles modèles	Éric Rohmer	Editor (uncredited)	Short film (unfinished)	
1954	Bérénice	Éric Rohmer	Cinematographer, Editor	Short film	
1954	Une Visite	François Truffaut	Cinematographer	Short film	
1954	Ali Baba and the Forty Thieves	Jacques Becker	Assistant director		
1954	French Cancan	Jean Renoir	Assistant director		
1956	La Sonate à Kreutzer	Éric Rohmer	Cinematographer	Short film	
1956	Fool's Mate	Jacques Rivette	Narrator (uncredited)	Short film	
1960	À bout de souffle	Jean-Luc Godard	Actor	Played the dead body of a man who was hit by a car	
1961	Paris Belongs to Us	Jacques Rivette	Actor	Played the Romanian man at the party	
1961	Jean Renoir parle de son art, Parts 1–3	Jean-Marie Coldefy	Interviewer	Rivette interviewed Renoir for three TV episodes: 1: Le cinéma et la parole, 2: Les progress de la technique, and 3: Le retour au naturel	
1961	Chronique d'un été	Jean Rouch and Edgar Morin	Participant	Rivette appeared briefly with his girlfriend Marilù Parolini, who was a main subject in the documentary	
1970	Rome is Burning (Portrait of Shirley Clarke)	André S. Labarthe	Interviewee	Episode of Cinéastes de notre temps	
1977	Toute révolution est un coup de dés	Jean-Marie Straub and Danièle Huillet	Dedicatee	Shot by William Lubtchansky and co-starring Marilù Parolini	
1979	La mémoire courte	Eduardo de Gregorio	Actor	Played Marcel Jaucourt. Shot by William Lubtchansky and edited by Nicole Lubtchansky	
1983	Rivette et Stévenin vont au bistrot	Jean-François Stévenin	Interviewee	Episode of Cinéma, Cinémas	
1989	Rivette: Histories du titres	Michel Boujut and Claude Ventura	Interviewee	Episode of Cinéma, Cinémas	
1990	Jacques Rivette, le veilleur	Claire Denis and Serge Daney	Interviewee	Full-length biography, episode of Cinéastes de notre temps	
1994	Joan the Maiden, Part 1: The Battles	Jacques Rivette	Actor	Played le prêtre	
1995	Up, Down, Fragile	Jacques Rivette	Actor	Played Monsieur Pierre	

== Theater work ==
Dates	Title	Venue	Notes	Ref.
February 6 to March 5, 1963	La Religieuse	Studio des Champs-Élysées	Later adapted into the film La Religieuse.	
April 18 to May 20, 1989	Tite et Bérénice and Bajazet	Théâtre Gérard Philipe	Same main cast from Gang of Four.	

== Alternative versions of his films ==
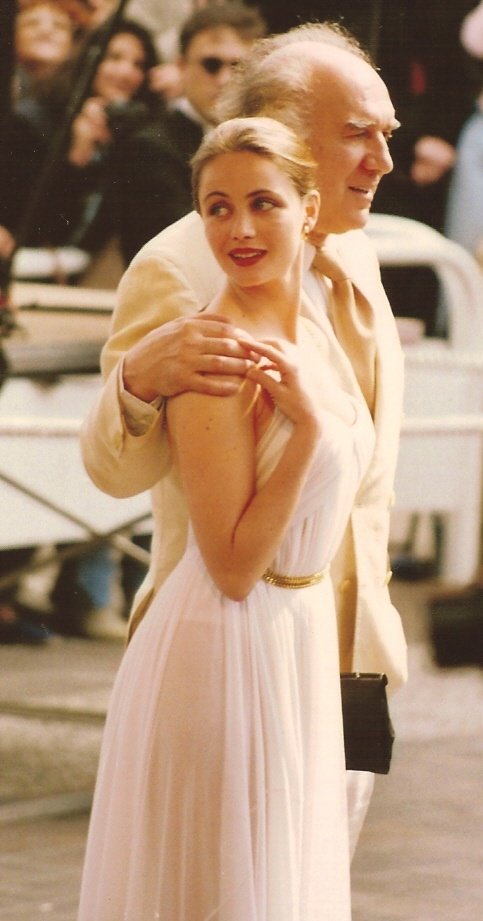
Emmanuelle Béart and Michel Piccoli at the 1991 Cannes Film Festival. Rivette cut a shorter version of La Belle Noiseuse called La Belle noiseuse: Divertimento.

Rivette edited shorter versions of several of his films with long running times. When L'Amour fou was released in January 1969 the 127 minute alternate version was simultaneously released at the production company's request. This version was simply a shorter version of the original work and Rivette immediately disowned it.

The shorter Out 1: Spectre was 260 minutes and released in March 1974. Rivette said that Spectre was more of "a fiction about certain characters", "much tighter", "more compelling" and that it was "a different film having its own logic; closer to a jigsaw or crossword puzzle than was [Noli me tangere], playing less on affectivity, more on rhymes and contrasts, ruptures and connections, caesurae and censorship." When Out 1: Noli me tangere was restored in 2006, Rivette re-edited the film, rearranging scenes and cutting a ten-minute sequence out of the original 760 minute version.

Love on the Ground was released as a 120-minute version after Rivette was forced to cut 50 minutes by the film's distributor. He said that the longer version was more complex and "structured similarly to Raymond Roussel's New Impressions of Africa, where there is a phrase, and then a parenthesis, which is tied to yet another phrase, and another parenthesis, ad infinitum." In order to cut 50 minutes out he simply "lifted the parentheses."

The shorter cut of La Belle noiseuse (called La Belle noiseuse: Divertimento) was 120 minutes. He made this version due to contractual obligations to the film's producers and used different takes than the original film. This version is an entirely new film and not just a shorter version of the original work. The word Divertimento is both a reference to Igor Stravinsky's Divertimento from Le baiser de la fée and translates to a "not too serious work." This shorter version changes the film's focus from the process of creating art to the evaluation of the finished product.

Rivette's original 220 minute cut of Va Savoir (called Va Savoir+) premiered on 24 April 2002 and only sold 1,734 tickets in its seven-week theatrical run at the cinema du Pantheon in Paris. Rivette said that Va Savoir+ is a completely different film than Va Savoir, the major difference being lengthy scenes of the actors performing Pirandello's Come tu mi vuoi instead of just rehearsals. Rivette said that in the longer version Pirandello's play is "another character" in the film.

== See also ==
- Themes and style in the works of Jacques Rivette
