= Jacques Rivette =

French film director, screenwriter and film critic

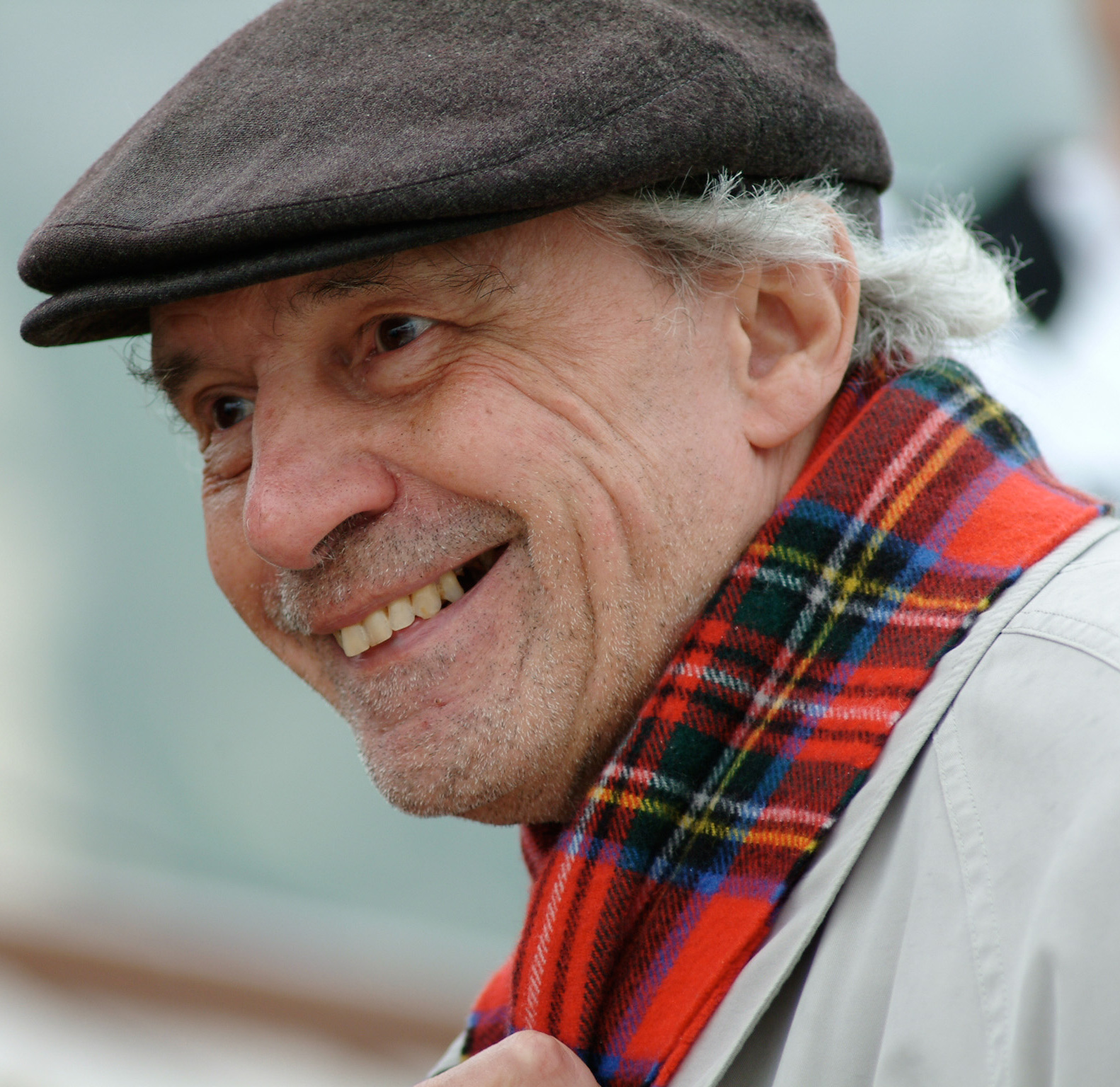
- Rivette in 2006
- Born: Jacques Pierre Louis Rivette; 1 March 1928; Rouen, France
- Died: 29 January 2016 (aged 87); Paris, France
- Occupations: Film director, film critic, theatrical director
- Years active: 1948–2009
- Known for: L'amour fou Out 1 Celine and Julie Go Boating; Le Pont du Nord; La Belle Noiseuse
- Movement: French New Wave
- Spouse(s): Marilù Parolini (divorced); Véronique Manniez-Rivette (his death)
- Awards: Sutherland Trophy; Grand Prix; Prix Méliès

Jacques Rivette (French: [ʒak ʁivɛt]; 1 March 1928 – 29 January 2016) was a French film director and film critic most commonly associated with the French New Wave and the film magazine Cahiers du Cinéma. He made twenty-nine films, including L'Amour fou (1969), Out 1 (1971), Céline and Julie Go Boating (1974), and La Belle Noiseuse (1991). His work is noted for its improvisation, loose narratives, and lengthy running times.

Inspired by Jean Cocteau to become a filmmaker, Rivette shot his first short film at age twenty. He moved to Paris to pursue his career, frequenting Henri Langlois' Cinémathèque Française and other ciné-clubs; there, he met François Truffaut, Jean-Luc Godard, Éric Rohmer, Claude Chabrol and other future members of the New Wave. Rivette began writing film criticism, and was hired by André Bazin for Cahiers du Cinéma in 1953. In his criticism, he expressed an admiration for American films – especially those of genre directors such as John Ford, Alfred Hitchcock and Nicholas Ray – and was deeply critical of mainstream French cinema. Rivette's articles, admired by his peers, were considered the magazine's best and most aggressive writings, particularly his 1961 article "On Abjection" and his influential series of interviews with film directors co-written with Truffaut. He continued making short films, including Le Coup de Berger, which is often cited as the first New Wave film. Truffaut later credited Rivette with developing the movement.

Although he was the first New Wave director to begin work on a feature film, Paris Belongs to Us was not released until 1961, by which time Chabrol, Truffaut and Godard released their own first features and popularised the movement worldwide. Rivette became editor of Cahiers du Cinéma during the early 1960s and publicly fought French censorship of his second feature film, The Nun (1966). He then re-evaluated his career, developing a unique cinematic style with L'amour fou. Influenced by the political turmoil of May 68, improvisational theatre and an in-depth interview with filmmaker Jean Renoir, Rivette began working with large groups of actors on character development and allowing events to unfold on camera. This technique led to the thirteen-hour Out 1 which, although rarely screened, is considered a Holy Grail of cinephiles. His films of the 1970s, such as Celine and Julie Go Boating, often incorporated fantasy and were better-regarded. After attempting to make four consecutive films, however, Rivette had a nervous breakdown and his career slowed for several years.

During the early 1980s, he began a business partnership with producer Martine Marignac, who produced all his subsequent films. Rivette's output increased from then on, and his film La Belle Noiseuse received international praise. He retired after completing Around a Small Mountain (2009), and it was revealed three years later that he had Alzheimer's disease. Very private about his personal life, Rivette was briefly married to photographer and screenwriter Marilù Parolini during the early 1960s and later married Véronique Manniez.

== Biography ==
=== 1928–1950: Early life and move to Paris ===
Jacques Pierre Louis Rivette was born in Rouen, Seine-Maritime, France, to André Rivette and Andrée Amiard, into a family "where everyone is a pharmacist". According to childhood friend André Ruellan, Rivette's father was a skilled painter who loved opera. His younger sister said that their home in Rouen was next to a cinema theatre, where she remembered watching Pathé Baby's Felix le Chat cartoons with Rivette and their grandparents. Rivette, educated at the Lycée Pierre-Corneille, said that he briefly studied literature at the university "just to keep myself occupied". Inspired by Jean Cocteau's book about the filming of Beauty and the Beast (1946), Rivette decided to pursue filmmaking and began frequenting ciné-clubs. In 1948, he shot his first short film, Aux Quatre Coins, in Rouen's Côte Sainte-Catherine section. The following year, he moved to Paris with friend, Francis Bouchet, because "if you wanted to make films it was the only way". On the day of his arrival, he met future collaborator Jean Gruault, who invited him to see Les dames du Bois de Boulogne (1945) at the Ciné-Club du Quartier Latin. Éric Rohmer, whose film criticism Rivette admired, gave a talk at the screening.

Although Rivette submitted his film to the Institut des Hautes Études Cinématographiques because it "was the kind of thing that would have pleased my parents", he was not accepted by the school. He took courses at the Sorbonne, but began frequenting screenings at Henri Langlois's Cinémathèque Française with Bouchet instead of attending classes. At the Cinémathèque, Rivette, Claude Chabrol, Jean-Luc Godard, François Truffaut, Suzanne Schiffman, Gruault and Bouchet were immersed in films from the silent and early "talkie" eras that they were previously unfamiliar with. He and this group of young cinephiles became acquainted as they customarily sat in the Cinématographique's front row for screenings; Rivette met Truffaut at a screening of The Rules of the Game (1939), and often sat next to Godard for several months without ever speaking to him before the latter introduced himself. Rivette was active in post-screening debates, and Rohmer said that, in film-quiz competitions at the Studio Parnasse he was "unbeatable". Rivette credited Langlois's screenings and lectures for helping him persevere during his early impoverishment in Paris: "A word from you saved me and opened the doors of the temple". Unlike his contemporaries, Rivette attended screenings at the Cinémathèque well into the 1970s.

He and his friends also attended screenings at the Ciné-Club du Quartier Latin, which was run by Rohmer. Although Rivette began to write film criticism in 1950 for the Gazette du Cinéma, founded by Rohmer with Bouchet as his assistant, the magazine ceased publication after five issues; Rivette said that being a critic was never his aim, but called it "a good exercise". That year he made his second short film, Le Quadrille, produced by and starring Godard, who raised the money by stealing and selling his grandfather's collection of rare Paul Valéry first editions. Rivette described Le Quadrille as a film in which "absolutely nothing happens. It's just four people sitting around a table, looking at each other." According to film critic Tom Milne, it had "a certain hypnotic, obsessional quality as, for 40 minutes, it attempted to show what happens when nothing happens". When the film was screened at the Ciné-Club du Quartier Latin, Rivette recalled, "After ten minutes, people started to leave, and at the end, the only ones who stayed were Jean-Luc and a girl." Later calling it Lettrist, he said that Isidore Isou, the founder of Lettrism, considered the film "ingenious".

=== 1950–1956: Film criticism and Le Coup du berger ===
After casual acquaintanceship and collaboration, Rivette and his fellow cinephiles became close friends in September 1950 at the Festival Indépendant du Film Maudit (Independent Festival of Accursed Film), a film festival in Biarritz produced by film critics Jacques Doniol-Valcroze, André Bazin and members of Objectif 49 (a group of avant-garde artists). Rivette, Godard, Truffaut and future cinematographer Charles Bitsch, arriving at the gala event in casual dress, were refused entrance by the doorman until Cocteau allowed them to enter. Openly antagonistic to members of Objectif 49, they loudly criticised the festival. The evening cemented the group's friendship, earning them a reputation of bohemian "young Turks" and troublemakers. Chabrol, Grualult, Rohmer, and Jean Douchet also attended and roomed together at the Biarritz Lycée dormitory for the festival. Rivette criticised the festival in the November issue of Gazette du cinéma, calling Objectif 49 arrogant and claiming a victory over them. He was quickly considered the leader of the group, whom Bazin called the "Hitchcocko-Hawksians." Rivette and his new friends bonded by spending whole days watching repeated screenings of a film and walking home together talking about what they had seen.

In 1951, Bazin founded a film magazine, Cahiers du Cinéma, and hired most of the "Hitchcocko–Hawksians"; Rivette began writing for the magazine in February 1953. Rivette championed Hollywood directors such as Howard Hawks and Fritz Lang and international directors such as Roberto Rossellini and Kenji Mizoguchi. He was highly critical of established qualité française directors, writing that they were afraid to take risks and were corrupted by money. According to Cahiers writer Fereydoun Hoveyda, early contributors to the magazine were politically right-wing except for Pierre Kast and Rivette. In early 1954, Rivette and Truffaut (nicknamed "Truffette and Rivaut") began a series of interviews with film directors whom they admired. The interviews, influential on film criticism, were recorded on a Grundig portable tape recorder weighing over 9 pounds (4.1 kg) which was never used by journalists. Although most entertainment reporting was limited to sound bites or anecdotes from film actors, Rivette and Truffaut became acquainted with the directors they interviewed and published their in-depth interviews verbatim. From 1954 to 1957, Cahiers du Cinéma published a series of interviews with noted film directors including Jacques Becker, Abel Gance, Hawks, Alfred Hitchcock, Fritz Lang, Jean Renoir, Roberto Rossellini and Orson Welles.

While he wrote criticism, Rivette continued his filmmaking career; during the summer of 1952, he made his third short film, Le Divertissement. Charles Bitsch called it "a Rohmer-esque Marivaudage between young men and women." Rivette, an assistant to Jacques Becker and Jean Renoir, was a cinematographer on Truffaut's short film Une Visite (1954) and Rohmer's short Bérénice (1954). Eager to make a feature film, he talked about elaborate adaptions of works by André Gide, Raymond Radiguet and Ernst Jünger. With financial support from Chabrol and producer Pierre Braunberger, Rivette made the 35mm short film Le Coup du Berger (1956). Written by Rivette, Chabrol and Bitsch, the film is about a young girl who receives a mink coat from her lover and must hide it from her husband; spoken commentary by Rivette describes the action like moves in a chess game. Jacques Doniol-Valcroze and Jean-Claude Brialy appeared in the film, with Godard, Truffaut, Bitsch and Robert Lachenay as extras. Shot in two weeks in Chabrol's apartment, the budget went entirely to purchasing film stock. It was distributed by Braunberger in 1957. Truffaut called Le Coup du berger the inspiration for him, Chabrol, Alain Resnais and Georges Franju to make their first films: "It had begun. And it had begun thanks to Jacques Rivette. Of all of us, he was the most fiercely determined to move." Rohmer praised the film's mise-en-scene and wrote that it had "more truth and good cinema than in all the other French films released in the past year."

=== 1957–1961: Paris Belongs to Us and the French New Wave ===
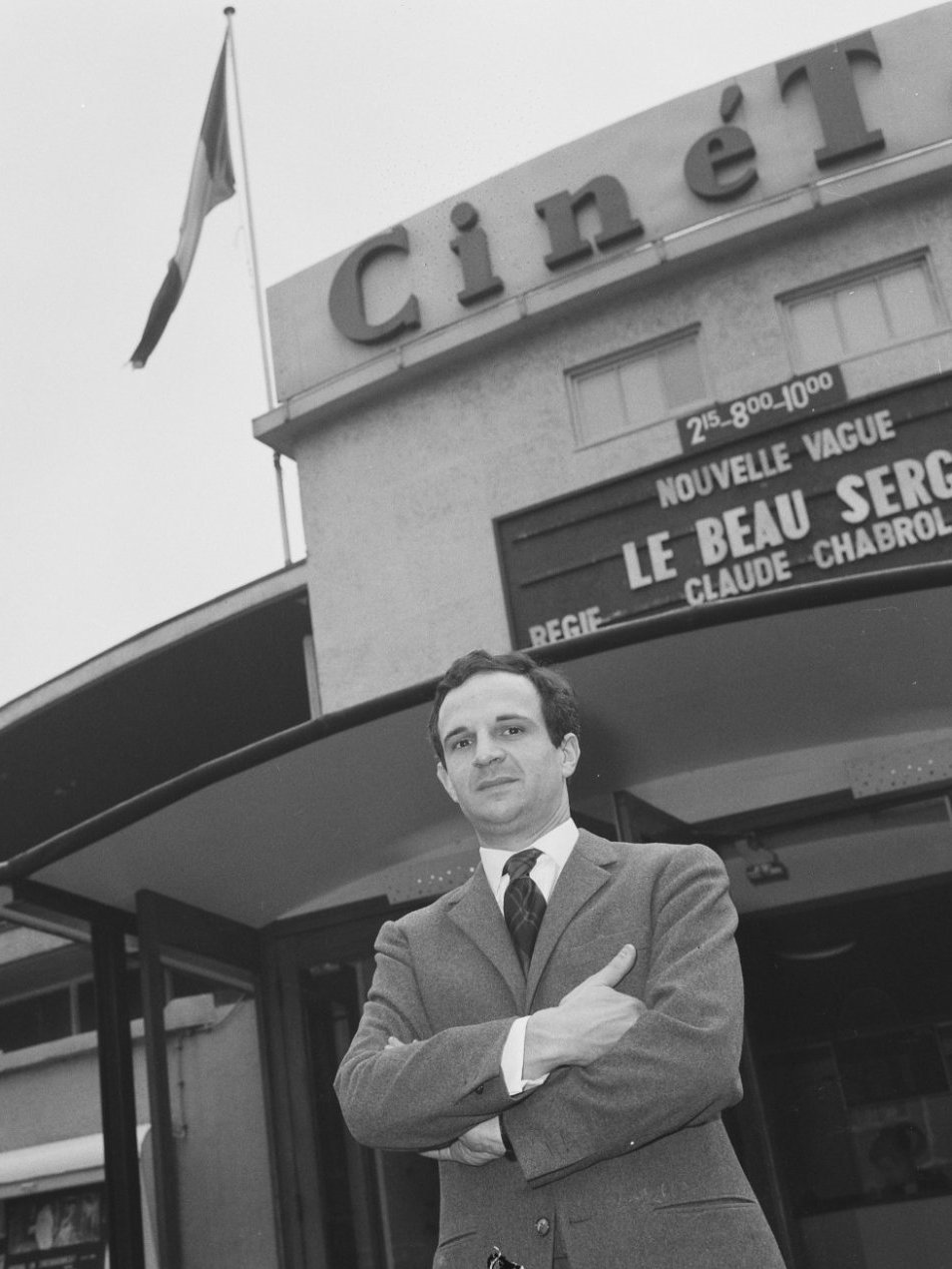
François Truffaut outside a theatre showing Claude Chabrol's Le Beau Serge (1958), considered the first film of the French New Wave. Truffaut was one of Rivette's best friends, and he and Chabrol helped finance Paris Belongs to Us.

In 1957, Italian neorealist director Roberto Rossellini announced that he wanted to produce a series of films about life in France. Several members of the French New Wave submitted scripts that would become their first films, including Chabrol's Le Beau Serge (1958), Rohmer's Sign of Leo (1959) and Truffaut's The 400 Blows (1959). Rivette was eager to make a film with Rossellini's help and met him along with co-writer Gruault to discuss the Cité Universitaire as a "melting pot of cultures and ideas" in Paris. Rossellini suggested that they research the project; shortly afterwards, they received ₣100,000 for their script, entitled La Cité, but Rossellini abandoned the project and went to India to make a film of his own.

Rivette and Gruault revised their story based on Rossellini's critique, and wrote Paris Belongs to Us. Its title is a play on Charles Péguy's quote, "Paris belongs to no one." With borrowed equipment, a loan of ₣80,000 from Cahiers du Cinéma and short film-reel ends provided by Chabrol, the silent film was shot in the summer of 1958 and sound was added the following year. Among Rivette's filming locations were the roof of the Théâtre Sarah-Bernhardt, the Rue des Cannettes, the Place Sorbonne and the Arts bridge. He struggled to finish the film and find distributors.

In Paris Belongs to Us, Anne (Betty Schneider), a young Parisian student rehearsing for a production of Shakespeare's Pericles, deals with the sudden death of the play's composer, a missing tape recording of its musical score, a secret society seeking world domination, an eccentric, paranoid American journalist, the suicide of the play's producer and the mysterious death of her brother. Chabrol, Godard, Jacques Demy and Rivette appear in minor roles.

Le Beau Serge and The 400 Blows were successful, and at the 1959 Cannes Film Festival, Truffaut and Chabrol used their fame to promote Paris Belongs to Us and help Rivette finish the film. According to Truffaut, who obtained funds for its completion, "The release of Paris nous appartient is a score for every member of the Cahiers du cinéma team". He helped Rivette premiere it at the Studio des Ursulines on 16 December 1961, followed by a run at the Agriculteurs cinema in Paris. Although reviews of the film were mixed, it was praised by L'Express. Pierre Marcabru of Combat said, "The connection between image and sound has never been so striking, evocative or necessary", and Jeander of Libération praised the film's depiction of "the moral and intellectual confusion of these young people who are repressed by their epoch for more than their elders". Rivette, who later said "It's the film of a sixteen-year-old child, but maybe its naïveté is where its strength lies", won the Sutherland Trophy for best first film from the British Film Institute.

Despite being the first of his friends to begin work on a feature, Chabrol, Truffaut and Godard had their feature-film debuts distributed before Rivette in what the French press called New Wave cinema. Rivette later compared the New Wave to impressionist painting; the availability of paint in tubes, which allowed artists to paint outdoors, was similar to technological advancements enabling filmmakers to shoot in the streets. Technical innovations such as faster film stock and the portable Nagra sound recorder became available after the director finished Paris Belongs to Us.

=== 1962–1967: Editor of Cahiers du cinéma and The Nun controversy ===
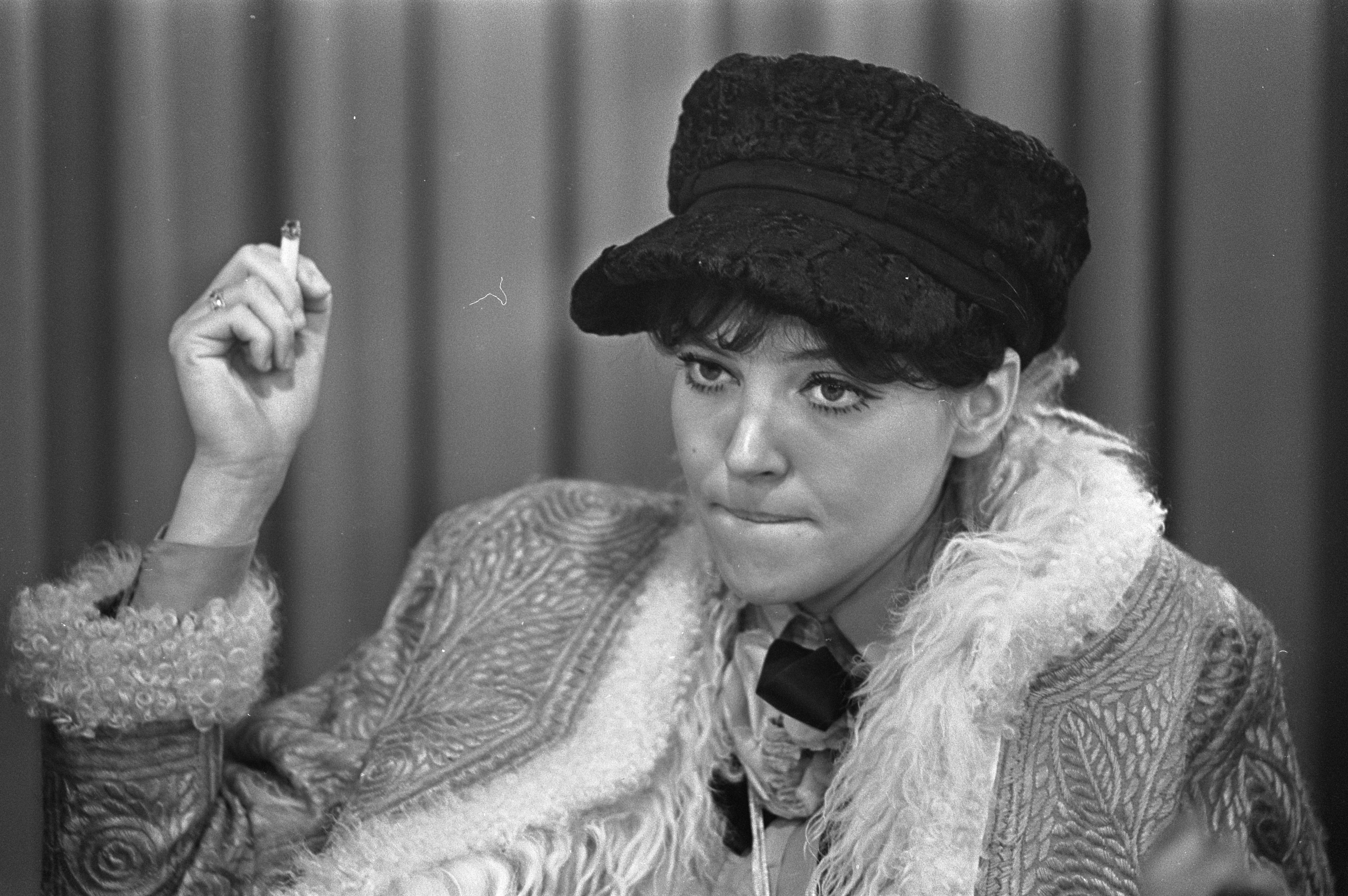
Rivette cast Jean-Luc Godard's wife, Anna Karina, in The Nun (1966) and directed a theatrical version with Karina.

After the financial failure of Paris Belongs to Us, Rivette unsuccessfully pitched a film adaptation of Denis Diderot's novel La Religieuse to producer Georges de Beauregard. Undaunted, Rivette and co-writer Gruault began writing the script. In 1962, Rivette suggested that Godard's wife, Anna Karina, would be perfect in the lead role. Godard agreed, but de Beauregard and producer Eric Schulmberger rejected the idea after a Commission de Controle (the French censorship board) review said that it would be banned.

Godard and Karina received funding from theatrical producer Antoine Bourseiller to produce a stage version of La Religieuse. Rivette directed and Godard produced the three-hour play, which opened at the Studio des Champs-Élysées on 6 February 1963 and closed on 5 March. Although the production was a financial failure, it received good reviews and Karina won several awards for her performance; Lotte Eisner called it "the most beautiful theatre I have seen since Bertolt Brecht". Rivette's staging, in the classical style of Marivaux, was intentionally simple. He and Gruault continued reworking the film script (which was finally passed by the censorship board), but Bourseiller could not afford to produce a film version, so the project was shelved.

After André Bazin's death in 1958, Rohmer became editor-in-chief of Cahiers du cinéma. By 1962, Rohmer was often at odds with his staff for not promoting New Wave filmmakers. After several financial failures, the directors wanted better publicity, with Cahiers an "instrument of combat" of the New Wave. Rohmer profiled New Wave filmmakers in the December 1962 issue before his June 1963 resignation, when Rivette became his successor. Rohmer later said that the pressure to leave Cahiers was the best thing that ever happened to him as a film director.

Under Rivette's leadership, Cahiers changed from a nonpolitical film magazine to a Marxist journal examining the relationship between politics and modern culture. Unlike Rohmer, Rivette allowed writers such as Michel Delahaye and Jean-Louis Comolli to publish articles gravitating towards politics and philosophy and not necessarily related to film. They wrote pieces on Martin Heidegger and Louis Althusser and interviewed non-filmmakers such as Roland Barthes and composer Pierre Boulez. Rivette and Delahaye's 1963 interview with Barthes is considered the turning point for Cahiers as a magazine analyzing film from a semiotic perspective. Rivette was an ambitious and financially irresponsible editor; shortly after an expensive, 250-page double issue on American films, Cahiers needed financial help. It was bought by teen-magazine owner Daniel Filipacchi, and its style became "splashier" and more youth-oriented. Rivette remained editor until April 1965, and was replaced by Jean-Louis Comolli and Jean Narboni. He contributed articles to the magazine until 1969.

Immediately after Rivette left Cahiers, Beauregard was ready to make The Nun (1966) and Rivette and Gruault again revised their script. Rivette called the script a record of the stage play, with a "highly written texture". On 31 August 1965, the censors told Beauregard that the film "run[s] the risk of being totally or partially cut". Beauregard ignored the warning, and Rivette began shooting in October. The film was controversial before its completion; members of the Catholic Church in France began a letter-writing campaign in opposition, and pressured Paris police commissioner Maurice Papon and Minister of Information Alain Peyrefitte to take action. Both said they would ban it.

Rivette finished The Nun in 1966. Although it was approved twice by the censorship board in March, new Minister of Information Yvon Bourges overrode the approvals in April and banned the film. In response, Beauregard began a public campaign in its defense; many journalists, including Godard and Chabrol, wrote editorials demanding the film's release. A "Manifesto of the 1,789" in support was signed by Jacques Prévert, Raymond Queneau, Marguerite Duras and several major French book publishers, and many Catholic priests and nuns denounced the ban's effect on freedom of speech. Rivette told Le Figaro Magazine, "It was as though they had guillotined us", and in Rouen his father André vehemently defended the film against the city's efforts to ban it.

Godard wrote a lengthy editorial criticising Minister of Culture André Malraux. Shortly afterwards, Malraux publicly defended The Nun, allowing it to premiere at the 1966 Cannes Film Festival, where it was not subject to censorship. At Cannes the film was critically praised, and Beauregard later successfully sued the censorship board. French President Charles de Gaulle called the controversy "silly", and ordered newly appointed Minister of Information Georges Gorce to lift the ban. The Nun was finally released on 26 July 1967, with the publicity helping make it Rivette's only hit film to that point. Although it received many good reviews, Guy Daussois of Le Populaire said that it was "marked by a schematisation and over-simplicity that is rarely encountered, with absolutely no human depth".

The Nun starred Karina as Suzanne Simonin, as a young woman forced into a convent by her family, who is physically and psychologically tortured. She attempts to escape while dealing with her hateful mother, an empathetic mother superior, an indifferent attorney, a lesbian nun and a sympathetic-but-lustful monk. According to Rivette, "The shooting of La Religieuse was difficult ... I was troubled because we had done the piece before as a play with the sentiments, rehearsals, etc, and I realized when I shot the film that since the people were doing the same text, the same words, my mind was wandering and I was no longer listening to the words". Karina described Rivette's direction as hyperactive; he was constantly "darting in and out of all corners ... always looking at this or that detail."

After the controversy surrounding The Nun, Rivette made a series of documentaries on director Jean Renoir for the French television series Cinéastes de notre temps which aired in 1966 as Jean Renoir, le patron. Around this time, Rivette and Gruault worked on a script for The Taking of Power by Louis XIV; Rivette decided that he did not want to direct another costume drama, and Rossellini directed the film in 1966.

=== 1968–1972: Political activism and cinematic style ===
In February 1968, Henri Langlois was ousted from the Cinémathèque Francaise by Malraux and Minister of Cultural Affairs Pierre Moinot; a government-appointed board of directors assumed control, and Rivette and his old friends reunited to fight for Langlois' reinstatement. With the Cahiers du Cinéma office as their headquarters, current and former staff members, including Rivette, Truffaut, Godard, Rohmer and Chabrol, began mass letter-writing and telephone campaigns to recruit support. Within days, filmmakers from around the world announced that they would halt screenings of their films unless Langlois was reinstated. Journalists from Le Monde and Combat expressed support, and on 12 February several hundred members of the film industry protested outside the Cinémathèque. Two days later, a protest by over 3,000 people was met by club-wielding police. Rivette spoke at a press conference and led a charge past one of the police barricades, briefly entering the Cinémathèque with Anne Wiazemsky. In March 1968, Rivette was appointed to an advisory committee, and the following month Langlois was reinstated in the Cinémathèque.

The protests led to the creation of the Etats généraux du cinéma Francais, a committee of film-industry workers who wanted more freedom to make films and less control by the Centre national de la cinématographie. At a May meeting attended by Rivette, the committee called for a strike by film-industry workers and a shutdown of the 1968 Cannes Film Festival in solidarity. Rivette called Truffaut at Cannes with the news, and Truffaut, Godard and other directors stopped the festival. In Paris, the Etats généraux du cinéma Francais organised mass street protests as part of the May 68 protest movement.

Rivette's next film was L'amour fou (1969). Frustrated by filmmaking convention, he wanted to create an improvisational atmosphere. Rivette dispensed with a script, shot list and specific direction, experimenting with scenarios and groups of actors. On a limited budget, he shot the film in five weeks. After seeing performances by director Marc'O's experimental-improvisational theatre group, Rivette cast Marc'O actors Jean-Pierre Kalfon and Bulle Ogier as the leads; other Marc'O performers appeared in supporting roles. According to the director, he cast Kalfon because of his dissimilarity to Rivette since he was self-conscious about the character's autobiographical aspects.

The film has several layers, including a theatrical group rehearsing a production of Jean Racine's Andromaque; a TV documentary crew filming the making of the play in 16mm, and a backstage story about the relationship between the stage director (Kalfon) and his wife and lead actress (Ogier). The film ends with an hour-long argument between Kalfon and Ogier, during which they destroy their apartment and its contents. Kalfon was allowed to direct the stage play during filming. Rivette cast André S. Labarthe as the director of the TV crew after working with him on Cinéastes de notre temps, allowing him to direct the 16mm footage. Rivette and cinematographer Alain Levent then filmed the stage performers and TV crew in 35mm from a distance without intervening. The film was entirely improvised, including the scene in which Kalfon and Ogier destroy their apartment (which had to be done in a single take for budgetary reasons). Released in 1969, the 252-minute film received positive reviews. L'amour fou gave Rivette his second Sutherland Trophy from the British Film Institute.

The director found his cinematic style during the making of this film. According to Rivette, "With improvisation, you automatically listen" and an author is an "analyst, a person who must listen to what the people say—all words are important. You must listen to all and not have any preconceived ideas as a director". Invigorated by his new filmmaking technique, Rivette invited over forty actors (including Jean-Pierre Leaud, Juliet Berto, Michael Lonsdale and Bulle Ogier) to each develop a character for a new film without a plot or interaction with each other. He then developed the basic structure for what would become Out 1 (1971). From April to June 1970, Rivette shot over 30 hours of 16mm footage as his cast improvised a story involving conspiracy theories and theatrical rehearsals.

Out 1 starred Jean-Pierre Leaud as Colin, a Parisian con artist who pretends to be a deaf-mute and begins receiving anonymous messages referring to Lewis Carroll's The Hunting of the Snark and Honoré de Balzac's Histoire des Treize (The Thirteen). Colin becomes obsessed with the messages, and begins to believe that a Utopian secret society like the one in Balzac's short story is contacting him. He is led to a boutique and meets Frederique (Juliet Berto), a young thief. Colin and Frederique use stolen letters to track down what they believe is the secret group, Thirteen, at a house where two groups of actors are rehearsing productions of Aeschylus's Prometheus Bound and Seven Against Thebes.

Out 1 was shown only once in its 760-minute original version at the Maison de la Culture in Le Havre, on 9–10 September 1971. Over 300 people attended the weekend-long premiere, and Martin Even of Le Monde called it a "voyage beyond cinema" because most of the audience had traveled from Paris to see it. Originally intended as a 12-part television broadcast, the Office de Radiodiffusion-Television Francaise refused to purchase it. With help from Suzanne Schiffman, Rivette spent over a year editing a 260-minute version entitled Out 1: Spectre and released in 1974. Out 1 was highly praised, and become a cult film. Because it was notoriously difficult to see in its entirety, and critics Jonathan Rosenbaum and Dennis Lim have called the film a "Holy Grail" for cinephiles. The first revival screening of the original version was at the Rotterdam Film Festival in February 1989. It was finally shown on French TV during the early 1990s and was first shown in the US at the Museum of the Moving Image in December 2006 to a sold-out audience.

=== 1973–1982: Fantasy films and nervous breakdown ===
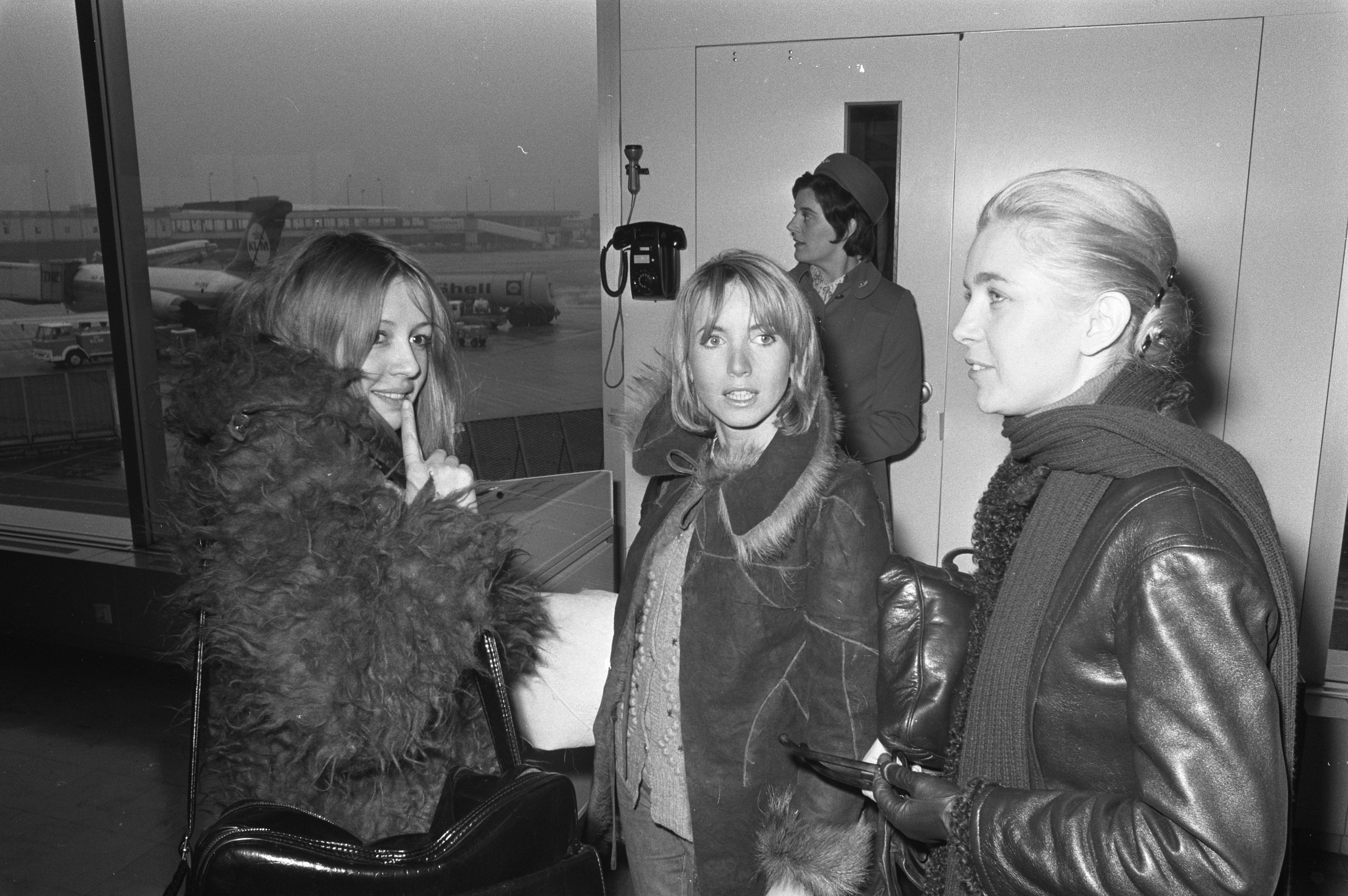
Juliet Berto (left) and Bulle Ogier (center) co-starred in Céline et Julie vont en bateau (1974); Marie Dubois is on the right. Ogier appeared in seven of Rivette's films.

During the summer of 1973, Rivette attempted to make Phénix, a film about the early-1900s Paris theatrical world which would have starred Jeanne Moreau. Due to budgetary constraints, he was forced to abandon the project. Rivette then made his most critically acclaimed film, Céline and Julie Go Boating (1974). "Aller en bateau" ("go boating") is French slang for "caught up in fiction" or "taken for a ride". Rivette met with friends, actresses Juliet Berto and Dominique Labourier, to develop two characters and created a plot and script with collaborator Eduardo de Gregorio. He later said that during this pre-production period, he "never had as much [fun]. I don’t believe I ever laughed as much". Unlike his previous two films, Rivette did not use improvisation during the filming and said that the plot was carefully constructed in advance.

Filled with references to Alice in Wonderland, Jean Cocteau and Marcel Proust, Céline and Julie Go Boating begins when Julie (Labourier), and Céline (Berto) meet by chance and become friends. They begin to visit a mysterious "House of Fiction" where the same melodrama (based on two short stories by Henry James) plays out every day, ending with the murder of a young girl by the enigmatic Sophie (Marie-France Pisier). Shot in five weeks during the summer of 1973, Céline and Julie Go Boating won the Special Jury Prize at the 1974 Locarno International Film Festival. It was produced by Barbet Schroeder and distributed by Les Films du Losange. Jonathan Rosenbaum praised it, writing that he knew "many women who consider Céline et Julie vont en bateau their favourite film about female friendship".

Rivette then conceived and obtained funding for a series of four films, Scènes de la vie parallèle. Each film would revolve around two female leads. Part one was to be a love story, part two a fantasy, part three an adventure and part four a musical comedy. According to Rivette, his intention for the film series was "to invent a new approach to film acting where speech, pared down to essential phrases, precise formulas, would play the role of poetic punctuation. Neither a return to silent cinema nor a pantomime, nor choreography: something else, where the movements of the bodies, their counterpoint and inscription in the space of the screen, will be the basis of [a] mise-en-scene." The tetralogy, reflecting the political situation in France, including the conservative backlash after May '68 and the election of Valéry Giscard d'Estaing, would be tied together by improvised musical scores. Rivette collaborated on the scenarios with de Gregorio and Parolini.

In Duelle (Une quarantaine) (1976), (Note: Both the French title – the feminine form for the noun "duel" – and the director's chosen English title Twhylight – a contraction of twilight and why – are neologisms.) the Queen of the Night (Juliet Berto) battles the Queen of the Sun (Bulle Ogier) over a magic diamond which will allow the winner to remain in modern-day Paris. In Noroît (Une vengeance) (1976), (Note: The title being a contraction of nord-ouest, "north-west," meaning the direction or the wind from that direction, in English a "nor'wester") the pirate Morag (Geraldine Chaplin) seeks revenge against the pirate Giulia (Bernadette Lafont) for killing her brother. Duelle was filmed in March and April 1975, and Noroît was shot at Brittany in May. De Gregorio saw Cyril Tourneur's The Revenger's Tragedy, and suggested it to Rivette. The script, written in 15th-century English, caused some difficulty for the actresses.

In August 1975, Rivette began filming part one of the series: Marie et Julien, a love story starring Albert Finney and Leslie Caron. After three days of shooting, Rivette broke down due to nervous exhaustion and production of the series was abandoned. Rivette later said that he "broke down physically.... I had overestimated my own strength." Although Marguerite Duras offered to finish the film, the actors refused to continue without Rivette. In 2003, he said that Marie et Julien was based on a true story of a woman who committed suicide. Rivette's musical-comedy fourth film would have starred Anna Karina and Jean Marais. Noroît premiered in London and was shown at the 1976 Cannes Film Festival, but was never distributed. It and Duelle received mediocre reviews, causing problems for Rivette with the series' producers. The director said that Susan Sontag enjoyed Noroît, and Jean Rouch recognised ancient African myths in its plot, where Rivette had included Celtic myths.

According to the director, it took over a year to recover from his breakdown. Producer Stéphane Tchalgadjieff had renegotiated the contract for the Scènes de la vie parallèle series to require only one more film, the intended first or fourth part. Rivette decided that he wanted to film both or neither and made an unrelated film, Merry-Go-Round (1981). Tchalgadjieff had told him that Maria Schneider wanted to make a film with him and actor Joe Dallesandro and Rivette agreed. Shot in 1978 but not completed until 1981, the film is a detective story about a missing sister and inheritance. Rivette relied on improvisation during its production, which he described after a few days as "going very badly". Although Schneider was also recovering from an illness and she and Rivette wanted to abandon the project, they were persuaded to continue by the cast and crew. Rivette said, "There were two people in poor health during filming, and there wasn’t any money at all". Over a year after filming was completed, he added footage of the film's composers, Barre Phillips and John Surman, in performance despite its lack of relation to the plot or characters. Merry-Go-Round, theatrically released in 1981, received mediocre reviews.

In 1980, Rivette decided to remake Out 1. Ogier, the only original-cast member available for the project, and her daughter Pascale Ogier worked with Rivette on the characters as the director had done a decade earlier. With co-screenwriter Suzanne Schiffman they made the 30-minute short film Paris s'en va (1980) as a sketch for the eventual feature Le Pont du Nord (1982), which was distributed in 1982. Le Pont du Nord starred Bulle and Pascale Ogier as two women who meet and investigate a strange Snakes and Ladders-like map of Paris and a mysterious man named Max. Rivette had difficulty finding financing, with the Centre national de la cinématographie refusing three times to fund the film. The director accommodated his tight budget by making Bulle Ogier's character claustrophobic, because he could not afford many interior scenes. According to Rivette biographer Mary Wiles, as Paris Belong to Us is a reflection of France during the 1950s and Out 1 the 1960s, Le Pont du Nord completes a trilogy by reflecting the social and political milieu of 1970s France.

=== 1983–1991: Partnership with Marignac and increased recognition ===
Rivette's difficulties in securing financial backing for his films during the late 1970s led him to a business partnership with Pierre Grise Productions and producer Martine Marignac (1946–2022). The company was the chief distributor and financier for all his subsequent films. Their first film, Love on the Ground (1984), again concerned a theatrical group and the blurring of fiction and reality. Geraldine Chaplin and Jane Birkin star as members of a theatrical troupe who are invited to appear in a new play resembling the real life of its director (Kalfon) and the mysterious disappearance of his wife.

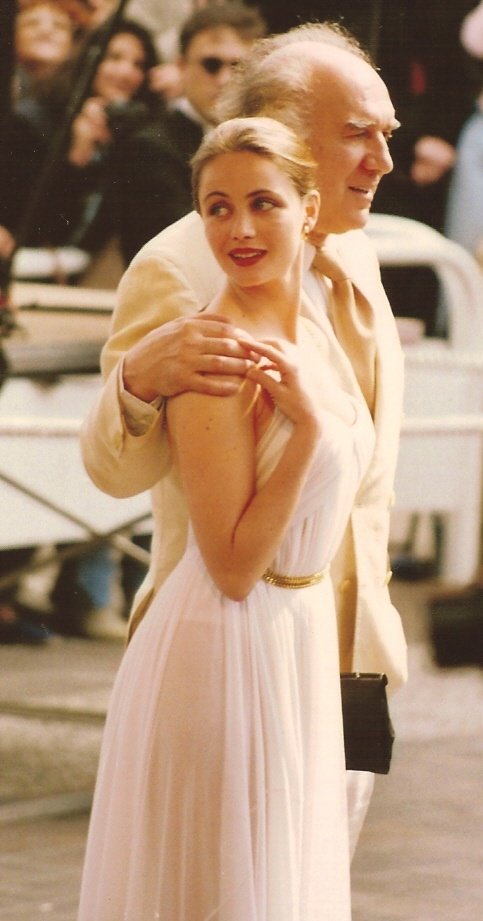
Emmanuelle Béart and Michel Piccoli at the 1991 Cannes Film Festival, where La Belle Noiseuse (1991) won two awards.

In a break from his experimental, complex style, Rivette next adapted Emily Brontë's Wuthering Heights. Based on the novel's first part and set in 1930s southern France, Hurlevent starred three unknown actors: Fabienne Babe as Catherine, Lucas Belvaux as Roch (Heathcliff) and Oliver Cruveiller as Catherine's brother, William. Hurlevent, Rivette's first film in years without his usual troupe of actors and technicians and modeled on Balthus' India ink illustrations, was released in 1985.

Rivette received critical acclaim for his 1988 film La Bande des quatre (Gang of Four), about four drama students whose lives playfully alternate from theatre to real life and make-believe. According to the director, who wanted to make a film about young people working on a play, "The work is always much more interesting to show than the result". The film received an honorable mention at the 39th Berlin International Film Festival.

He enjoyed working with the four young actresses in La Bande des quatre so much, that Rivette returned to the theatre. The actresses had performed a scene from Pierre Corneille's Suréna in La Bande des quatre, so Rivette, the actresses and additional performers rehearsed Corneille's Tite et Bérénice, Jean Racine's Bajazet and a play by Pierre de Marivaux (which was eventually dropped "because he was too hard"). After several weeks of rehearsals, the actresses were ready to perform the two plays, which ran at the Théâtre Gérard Philipe in Saint-Denis from 18 April to 20 May 1989. According to Rivette, Corneille's play was more interesting for the actresses; he was "very deep. He's an author I find very dense, so full of history, of thought".

Saul Austerlitz called La Bande des quatre's success "Rivette’s second wind as a filmmaker"; it led to La Belle Noiseuse (The Beautiful Troublemaker) (1991), the most-acclaimed film of Rivette's later career. Loosely based on the Balzac short story "The Unknown Masterpiece", it depicts the relationship between reclusive, uninspired painter Frenhofer (Michel Piccoli), his wife and former model Liz (Birkin) and his new model, Marianne (Emmanuelle Béart). Marianne inspires Frenhofer to finish his long-abandoned magnum opus, La Belle Noiseuse, as Liz and Marianne's boyfriend become increasingly jealous. The four-hour film shows the painting's progress in real time, one brush stroke at a time, with hand close-ups by French abstract painter Bernard Dufour. According to Rivette, "We tried truly to make a film that did not talk about painting, but approached it". The film earned him the Grand Prix at the 1991 Cannes Film Festival and the Prix Méliès from the French Syndicate of Cinema Critics. It received five César Award nominations, including Best Picture and Best Director (Rivette's only nomination in that category). Shortly after its Cannes success, a two-hour version, La Belle Noiseuse: Divertimento, was theatrically released.

=== 1992–2009: Later films and retirement ===
Rivette then made a two-part film about the life of Joan of Arc entitled Joan the Maiden: Joan the Maiden, Part 1: The Battles and Joan the Maiden, Part 2: The Prisons (1994). Rivette's film differed from well-known interpretations of Joan by Carl Theodor Dreyer and Robert Bresson, focusing on her popularity in France rather than her suffering and martyrdom. Loosely based on Rivette's memories of Charles Péguy's books on Joan, the film was partially shot in his hometown of Rouen. Joan the Maiden, starring Sandrine Bonnaire, was released in 1994.

With its large budget, the film was not a financial success. Because of this, Martine Marignac wanted to make a quick, inexpensive film; Rivette, short of ideas, began assembling a cast. He contacted Nathalie Richard, Marianne Denicourt and Laurence Côte, who gave him an idea for a film about 1920s New York City taxi dance halls; this led to Up, Down, Fragile (1995). Richard, Denicourt and Côte star as three women struggling to overcome personal obstacles, with musical numbers at a mysterious nightclub commenting on their lives. In the film, a nod to 1920s and 1930s Hollywood backstage musicals, Anna Karina appears as a nightclub singer whose songs refer to her previous films with Godard. Up, Down, Fragile was screened at the 19th Moscow International Film Festival.

Rivette's film policier, Top Secret (1998), featured Bonnaire as a young scientist whose brother (Grégoire Colin) convinces her that their father was killed by Walser (Jerzy Radziwilowicz) and seeks revenge. Rivette said that the film, loosely based on the Electra myth, was influenced more by Jean Giraudoux's lesser-known play than on the classical versions by Aeschylus, Sophocles and Euripides. Top Secret pays tribute to Double Indemnity (1944), and biographer Mary Wiles saw influences from Hitchcock's Strangers on a Train (1951) and Vertigo (1958). Wiles called Rivette's three films with Bonnaire feminist, writing that they "reveal a deep personal connection with [Rivette]."

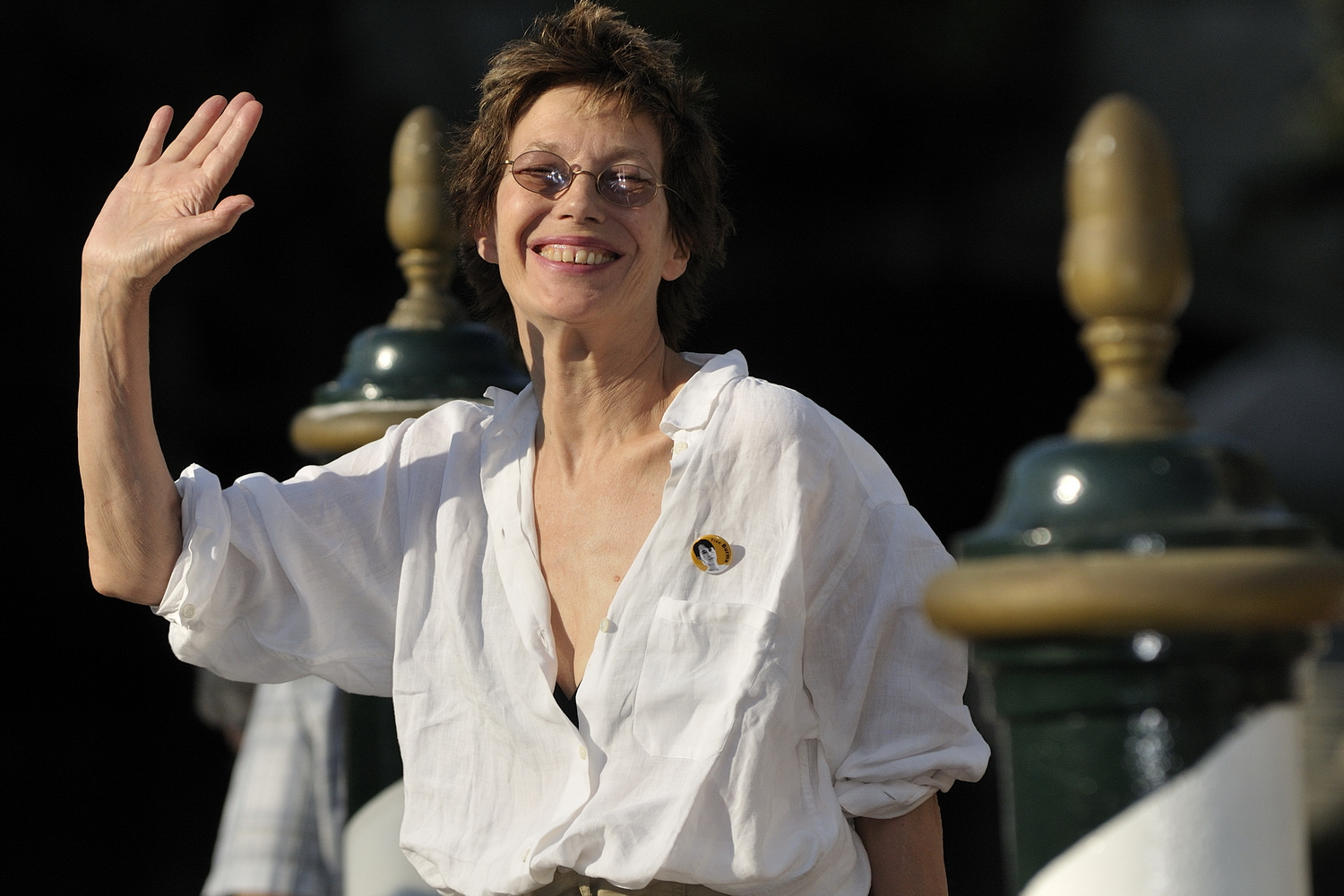
Jane Birkin at the 66th Venice International Film Festival premiere of 36 Views from the Pic Saint-Loup in 2009. Birkin appeared in three of Rivette's films.

Va savoir (2001) starred Jeanne Balibar and Sergio Castellitto as a couple caught up in romantic farce as they attempt to stage Luigi Pirandello's Come tu mi vuoi and search for a missing manuscript. Rivette pays tribute to Howard Hawks' screwball comedies, and includes a reference to It Happened One Night (1934). The film's theatrical-director character, Ugo, intentionally resembles Gerard in Paris Belongs to Us. A longer version, Va Savoir+ was released the following year. According to Saul Austerlitz, it is "a stunning film, and is yet another peak in Jacques Rivette's exceptional career."

In 2002, Rivette published a book of scripts from three of his unmade films, including Marie et Julien. The script for Marie et Julien had never been completed, and the footage from the three days of shooting was lost; Rivette worked from "cryptic notes" taken by his assistant, Claire Denis, which cinematographer William Lubtchansky had kept for decades. His work on a readable script for the publication led him to resurrect the project. Rivette, Pascal Bonitzer and Christine Laurent collaborated on the script with the actors during production of the revised The Story of Marie and Julien (2003). Rivette cast Béart and Radziwilowicz in the lead roles, saying that it was "more interesting and more exciting" to work with actors with whom he had previously worked, and some dialogue in the original notes was unchanged. Although the film lacked the improvised musical score connecting the first two films, the Madame X character resembles the moon goddess and Marie the sun goddess. It premiered at the 2003 Toronto International Film Festival.

In 2007, Rivette made The Duchess of Langeais, a faithful adaptation of Balzac's novel, and the second of Balzac's trilogy Histoire des treize, the introduction to which inspired Out 1. Jeanne Balibar and Guillaume Depardieu star as lovers in early 1823 Majorca who are involved in a tormented, frustrating relationship. The film premiered at the 2007 Toronto International Film Festival. In 2009, Rivette made 36 vues du pic Saint-Loup; Jane Birkin starred as a woman who returns to her childhood circus troupe after her father dies, and begins a romance with a wealthy Italian drifter (Sergio Castellitto). The film, which premiered at the 66th Venice International Film Festival, was the director's last.

== Personal life ==
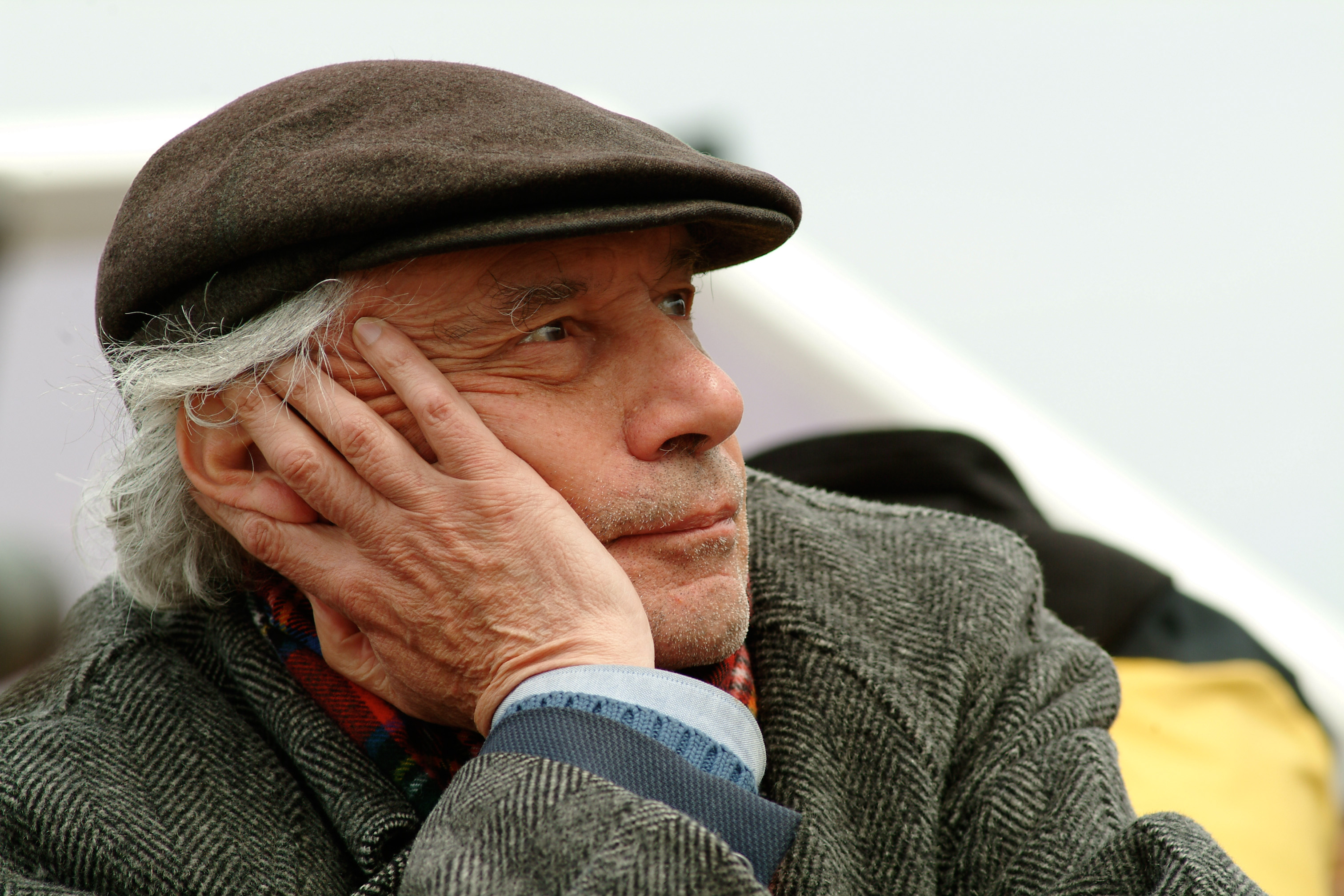
Rivette during filming of The Duchess of Langeais in 2006

Rivette's early years in Paris were impoverished and he was known to live ascetically on minimal resources; Chabrol said that he was very thin and hardly ate, comparing his smile to that of the Cheshire Cat. Gruault described Rivette as "slight, dark-haired and [having] very lively dark eyes in an emaciated visage of a waxy pallor...add to that a forced, nervous smile of someone who has to make constant efforts to win acceptance by a society that he seemed to regard as irremediably hostile." His opinions were highly regarded among his peers and according to Douchet, "[Rivette] was the great talker. He was the group's secret soul, the occult thinker, a bit of a censor." Godard said, "I might like a film very much, but if Rivette said 'It's no good' then I would agree with him ... it was as though he had a privileged access to cinematographic truth." Truffaut considered Rivette his best friend, and they were frequently seen at screenings. Truffaut said that in the 1950s, Rivette was the only member of the group already capable of directing a feature film.

Rivette's friendship with Rohmer was complex due to Rivette's direct role in getting Rohmer fired from Cahiers du Cinéma. Rivette and Rohmer respected each other, but fought over Cahiers' political and aesthetical positions and financial issues. They became close friends again after Rohmer became interested in Rivette's improvisational films, praising L'amour fou and acting in Out 1. Rohmer later called Out 1 "a capitol monument in the history of modern cinema, an essential part of the cinematic heritage." Rivette also admired Rohmer's films and called Les Rendez-vous de Paris (1995) a "film of absolute grace." Several Cahiers writers during the Rohmer-era disliked him, such as Douchet, Jean Domarchi, Fereydoun Hoveyda, Phillippe Demonsablon, Claude Beylie and Phillippe d’Hugues, who said that Rivette "had a Saint-Just side, he was an intransigent Jacobin who considered you a moron if you didn't agree with him. He determined what was moral and right, like a hall monitor." Antoine de Baecque wrote that these writers respected Rivette, but considered him "brusque, arrogant and dogmatic" and that he "did not hesitate to excommunicate adversaries or mediocrities". However Cahiers writers André Labarthe and Michel Delahaye praised him; Delahaye said that he "was the most brilliant, with a peerless charisma."

According to David Thomson, Rivette was "famous for having little or no home life, certainly not a private life that overlaps with his work. On his own, he would rather sit in the dark with another movie"; in 1956, he was described as "too aloof and forbiddingly intellectual". Bulle Ogier described Rivette as very secretive about his life: "I've no idea what he does. I only see him when we're filming" or when she bumped into him in public, although she felt close to him. According to Ogier, he had neuroses and anxiety which often prevented him from answering the phone, and talking about his personal life would be indiscreet and a betrayal. Laurence Côte said that joining Rivette's inner circle of trusted friends was difficult and required "a number of hurdles to overcome and to respect codes." Martine Marignac said that Rivette was very modest and shy, and that his circle of close friends grew used to not hearing from him for prolonged periods of time. Marignac also said that "He spends his life going to the movies, but also reading, listening to music. It is clear that the world of reality assaults him." Jonathan Romney reported that in the 1970s "Rivette sometimes went AWOL from his own shoots, he would invariably be found watching some rarity in one of the Left Bank art cinemas." Jean-Pierre Léaud, who described Rivette as a close friend, said that he "was the only person who saw everything in a film. And he transmitted everything he saw to us, setting in march our own aesthetic ideas". The director was the subject of a 1990 documentary, Jacques Rivette, the Night Watchman, directed by Claire Denis and Serge Daney. Travis Mackenzie Hoover wrote that the documentary portrays Rivette with "lonerish tendencies" and as "a sort of transient with no home or country, wandering about or loitering in public space instead of staking out some personal terra firma."

In 1960, he appeared briefly with girlfriend Marilù Parolini in Jean Rouch and Edgar Morin's cinéma-vérité documentary, Chronique d'un été. Parolini was a secretary at Cahiers and, later, an on-set still photographer for Rivette and other New Wave filmmakers. She and Rivette married, but they broke up shortly after the stage version of The Nun closed and eventually divorced. They continued a professional relationship; Parolini collaborated with Rivette on L'amour fou, Duelle, Noroît and Love on the Ground as a co-writer, and she took photographs on the sets of The Nun and Celine and Julie Go Boating. Parolini died in Italy on 21 April 2012.

On 20 April 2012, film critic David Ehrenstein posted online that Rivette had Alzheimer's disease. Bonitzer and Marignac later said that he began to feel the disease's effects during the negative experience of filming 36 vues du pic Saint-Loup. Shooting days were four hours on average and Rivette often lost track of what had already been filmed, which led to the shorter running time than his previous films. In the mid-2000s, Rivette met his second wife Veronique Manniez. They married shortly after he was diagnosed with Alzheimer's. Marignac said that, "Thanks to her, he avoided hospitals and was able to stay home." Rivette and his wife lived in the Rue Cassette section of Paris, where caregivers and doctors attended to him for the last eight years of his life.

Ever since Parmenides, and his duel
between being and not-being, the
greatest minds have jabbered
on and on about this
brotherly squabble, wringing hands over
Socrates' alphabet, in vain until
Google:
power and glory,
liberty and fraternity,
peace and war,
infinity and totality,
penury and democracy,
terror and virtue,
poetry and truth,
et cetera,
I actually for a second wanted to add
nature and metaphor
to all this charivari,
believing to grasp reality, like
it's said by the pros and the
amateurs of the profession,
mixing shot and reverse-shot,
but this evades one
last time all those
vanities, that the little boy
from Rouen, having in the end taken back
his mind from his movie life,
as a man simple and complicated
as he was, a match for
himself and justly proclaiming:
secret and law — for the screen
did not hide anything from anything. — Jean-Luc Godard, in the interview "Le secret et la loi" in the March 2016 issue of Cahiers du Cinéma

== Death ==
Rivette died on 29 January 2016 from complications of Alzheimer's disease at the age of 87, in his home in Paris. He was memorialised by President François Hollande as "one of the greatest filmmakers" and praised by Minister of Culture Fleur Pellerin. Members of the French film industry eulogised him; Serge Toubiana said "Rivette was undoubtly the most reflective, thoughtful, the most intellectual figure of the New Wave." Bulle Ogier wrote that Rivette's "body of work was inventive, researched and well structured. Nothing but making films interested him." Isabelle Regnier wrote about Rivette's secretive nature, observing that the mystery about his life "prevails in his grave." Cinémathèque française director Frédéric Bonnaud called Rivette influential and said that he always tried to invent a new kind of cinema with every film he made. Longtime collaborator Pascale Bonitzer said that "he was a bit of an outsider in the Nouvelle Vague and, at the same time, he was its soul, one of the most radical ones, and the most confidential." Jean-Michel Frodon said that he incarnated "the spirit of the New Wave." Hélène Frappat praise his use of mise en scène in regards to his portrayal of women. Martin Scorsese called him a fascinating artist who was "the most experimental of the French New Wave directors."

Richard Brody called Rivette "the most open and the most reticent of French filmmakers", claiming that all of Rivette's films "represent an effort to capture the fullness of an inner world, a lifetime’s range of obsessions and mysteries." Unlike other obituaries that focused mostly on his filmmaking career, Brody praised Rivette for his influence on film criticism, singling out his 1961 article "On Abjection", a review of Gillo Pontecorvo's holocaust film Kapò. Brody called it "a touchstone for discussing any film in which atrocities are committed." In France, Jean-Marie Pottier also praised "On Abjection" as "one of the most famous texts in the history of the French cinephile." Other film critics to have previously praised the article include Serge Daney and Antoine de Baecque, and Godard's famous quote "tracking shots are a question of morality" was influenced by the article. Locarno Film Festival artistic director Carlo Chatrian wrote that Rivette "made the first and best attempt to transpose the ideas of André Bazin into critical writings" and praised such articles as "The Genius of Howard Hawks" and "Letter on Rossellini."

Rivette was buried on 5 February 2016 in the Montmartre Cemetery in Paris, not far from François Truffaut's grave. Bonitzer, Marignac and Narboni all spoke at the funeral. Rivette's sister and nephews also attended. Véronique Manniez-Rivette told the funeral goers that just as angels are said to sing during moments of silence at twenty minutes past the hour, Rivette had died at 12:20pm. The March 2016 issue of Cahiers du Cinéma was dedicated to him. In May 2016 the Cinémathèque française announced that Rivette's first three short films had been rediscovered by his widow and were being restored and then screened at the Festival Coté Court that June.

== Works ==
- Jacques Rivette filmography
- Jacques Rivette bibliography
- Themes and style in the works of Jacques Rivette

== Notes ==
Media offices
Preceded by Éric Rohmer	Editor of Cahiers du cinéma 1963–1965	Succeeded by Jean Narboni
