= Themes and style in the works of Jacques Rivette =

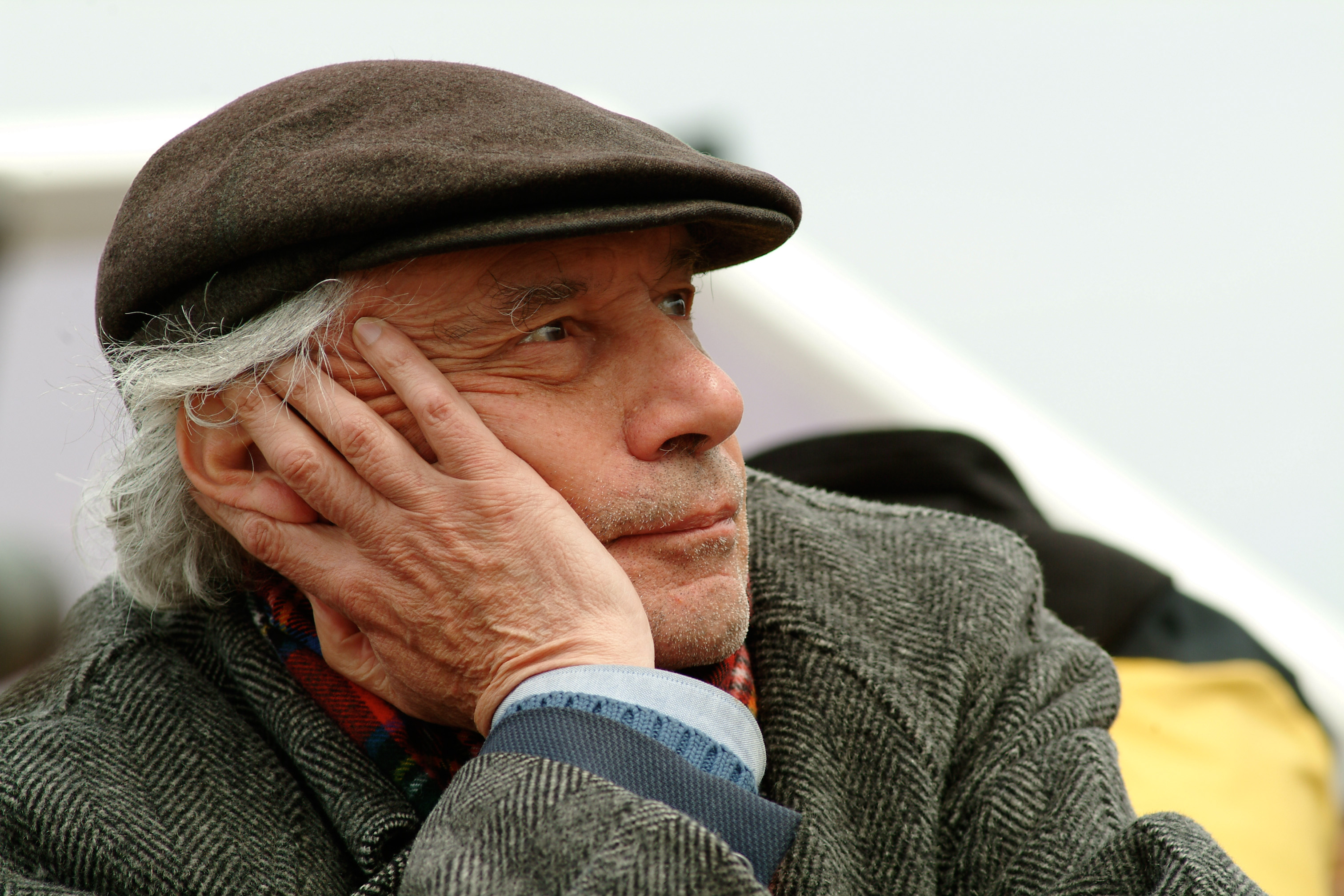
Rivette in 2006

Jacques Rivette (French: [ʒak ʁivɛt]; 1 March 1928 – 29 January 2016) was a French film director and film critic most commonly associated with the French New Wave and the film magazine Cahiers du Cinéma. He made twenty-nine films, including L'amour fou (1969), Out 1 (1971), Celine and Julie Go Boating (1974), and La Belle Noiseuse (1991). His work is noted for its improvisation, loose narratives, and lengthy running times.

Rivette's films explore themes such as conspiracy theories and theatricality in daily life. His frequent combination of conspiratorial crime stories and carefree characters has led him to be compared to Louis Feuillade, Howard Hawks, and Jean Renoir. Rivette is also lauded for his complex female characters, leading some of his films to be regarded as forefathers of the female buddy film. Critic David Thomson famously called Celine and Julie Go Boating "the most innovative film since Citizen Kane...whereas Kane was the first film to suggest that the world of the imagination was as powerful as reality, Celine and Julie is the first film in which everything is invented." Other scholars who have written extensively about Rivette include Jonathan Rosenbaum and Hélène Frappat.

== Themes ==
Time was, in a so-called classical tradition of cinema, when the preparation of a film meant first of all finding a good story, developing it, scripting it and writing dialogue; with that done, you found actors who suited the characters and then you shot it ... What I have tried ... is to attempt to find, alone or in company, ... a generating principle that will then, as though on its own (I stress the "as though"), develop in an autonomous manner and engender a film product from which, afterwards, a film destined eventually for screening for audiences can be cut, or rather "produced". — Rivette, shortly after finishing L'amour fou

Rivette's films, often with themes involving mysteries and conspiracy theories, rely on improvisation. Jonathan Rosenbaum wrote, "Every Rivette film has its Eisenstein/Lang/Hitchcock side—an impulse to design and plot, dominate and control—and its Renoir/Hawks/Rossellini side: an impulse to 'let things go', open one's self up to the play and power of other personalities, and watch what happens".

The director's use of improvisation resulted from his negative experience filming The Nun and seeing Jean Rouch's cinéma-vérité documentaries, particularly his in-depth interview with Jean Renoir while making Jean Renoir, le patron. According to Rivette, he was not comfortable with his work until he made L'Amour fou. Describing his difficulties in shooting The Nun and finding his own cinematic style, he said: "Sometimes it is necessary to go a very long distance out of your way in order to come back a short distance correctly". Rivette wrote a ten-page outline for L'amour fou, which he developed with Marilù Parolini and the actors before production began. He and Parolini then wrote a thirty-page "calendar" of events outlining the characters' actions, giving the actors control of their actions and dialogue during production. Rivette said, "What was exciting was creating a reality which began to have an existence on its own, independently of whether it was being filmed or not, then to treat it as an event that you're doing [as] a documentary". He continued using varieties of improvisation throughout his career. Parolini said that for Love on the Ground they wrote "a biographical sheet for each of the characters and a list of numbered scenes providing a course of action, mostly related to the shooting schedule". Rivette would then rehearse improvised scenes with the actors and collaborate with Parolini, Suzanne Schiffmann and Pascal Bonitzer on a script based on their improvisation. Bonitzer said that he "conceived of work as a kind of game; he no longer wanted total improvisation and at the same time wanted the intrigue itself loosened up somewhat, only slightly defined" and called his method "théâtre d'appartement."

While interviewing Renoir, Rivette was inspired by his subject's relationship with the actors on set and his willingness to allow them to improvise (creating a higher form of realism). According to Rivette,

The three weeks I spent with Renoir ... made quite an impression on me. After a lie, all of a sudden, here was the truth. After a basically-artificial cinema, here was the truth of the cinema. I therefore wanted to make a film, not inspired by Renoir, but trying to conform to the idea of a cinema incarnated by Renoir, a cinema which does not impose anything, where one tries to suggest things, to let them happen, where it is mainly a dialogue at every level, with the actors, with the situation, with the people you meet, where the act of filming is part of the film itself.

Jean-André Fieschi has theorized that Rivette was influenced by a 1964 Cahiers interview he conducted with composer Pierre Boulez. Boulez said that his compositions were "guided by chance" and "a kind of labyrinth ... with a number of paths."

== Film criticism ==
Serge Daney said that Rivette's writing style "was by far the most forceful of anyone writing at that time". According to Rivette, his assertiveness "matched my character". Truffaut wrote, "His articles are the most comprehensive and the best that have ever been published in Cahiers." Antoine de Baecque said, "His articles are often the most carefully thought out, and provide the most elegant formulation of some of the Cahiers' fundamental beliefs regarding cinema". Douglas Morrey wrote, "Rivette's articles on films are both verbose and incisive, at the same time carefully worked-out analyses and blunt statements of adoration." Rivette championed American directors such as Howard Hawks, John Ford, Nicholas Ray and Fritz Lang and international directors such as Roberto Rossellini and Kenji Mizoguchi. He was highly critical of established qualité française directors such as Claude Autant-Lara, Henri-Georges Clouzot and René Clément, writing that they were afraid to take risks and were corrupted by money.

Although Rivette admired André Bazin, describing him as "the only person I'd met who gave me a feeling of sainthood", his writing was sometimes at odds with Bazin's philosophies on realism and formalism. He was also influenced by Truffaut's auteur theory and his 1954 article, "A Certain Trend of French Cinema", which criticized the artificial theatricality and staged appearance of many films. Rivette agreed with Truffaut's theories, even though nearly all his films revolved around a theatrical production. According to Rivette, "All films are about the theatre; there is no other subject ... the subject of truth and lies ... Performance is the subject. Taking it as the subject of a film is being frank". Jacques Aumont said that Rivette used theater and its portrayal to achieve "a true realism" in films, and Wiles calls his theatricality "an implicit response to Bazin".

Rivette rejected the auteur theory, calling it a myth: "There is no auteur in films ... a film is something which preexists in its own right. It is only interesting if you have this feeling that the film preexists and that you are trying to reach it, to discover it, taking precautions to avoid spoiling it or deforming it". According to Irene Pozzi, Rivette's use of improvisation "is based on the idea to get rid of the author and director, [and] is made possible only by the network of collaborators that the director has woven around himself ... The figure of the author, rather than disappear, is blown up and, once fragmented, is embodied in a number of people, interacting with each other, creating day by day the scaffolding on which the film is constructed". Rivette said, "If cinema has a social function it's really to make people confront other systems of thought, or other systems of living than the ones they habitually know." Rivette was also influenced by Rohmer's film criticism, specifically his praise of modernity.

== Influences and frequent collaborators ==
Michel Marie has compared the city shots in Paris Belongs to Us to scenes in Louis Feuillade's Les Vampires and René Clair's Paris qui dort, and the film's vague secret police to Doctor Mabuse in Fritz Lang's films. Marie wrote, "Rivette's Paris is an obscure maze, where intricate conspiracies are hatched by the vague Organization, a lucid premonition of the French Organization of the Secret Army (OAS). All of the characters feel threatened." James Monaco and Roy Ames criticized Rivette's view as too theatrical.

Another major influence on Rivette's work was Jean Cocteau, who inspired him to become a filmmaker. Rivette became close to Cocteau near the end of the older man's life, developing what Wiles called a filial relationship. The themes and tone of Noroit were a partial homage to Cocteau's work on Pelléas et Mélisande; Duelle makes direct references to Blood of a Poet and Les Chevaliers de la Table ronde, and Celine and Julie Go Boating was influenced by Orphée

He worked with a number of actors (Jeanne Balibar, Emmanuelle Béart, Juliet Berto, Jane Birkin, Sandrine Bonnaire, Sergio Castellitto, Geraldine Chaplin, Laurence Côte, Marianne Denicourt, Nicole Garcia, Anna Karina, André Marcon, Bulle Ogier, Michel Piccoli, Jerzy Radziwilowicz and Nathalie Richard) on multiple films. Rivette also worked repeatedly with writers and technicians, such as Charles Bitsch, Pascal Bonitzer, Claire Denis, Eduardo de Gregorio, Jean Gruault, Christine Laurent, Nicole Lubtchansky, William Lubtchansky, Marilù Parolini and Suzanne Schiffman.

The director worked with editor Nicole Lubtchansky on all his films beginning with L'amour fou. Rivette liked long takes because "they're more enjoyable to do, [and] the actors like them better", but Paris Belongs to Us had fast-paced editing and an average shot length of twelve seconds. Beginning with Duelle, Rivette worked with Lubtchansky's husband William, as cinematographer on nearly all his films. Rivette and William Lubtchansky did not plan the film's look in advance, collaborating on set after Rivette had rehearsed with the actors. According to Dave Kehr, "With Mr. Lubtchansky present, he would run through the scene several times, and then consult with his cinematographer to choose the camera angles and lighting schemes he believed most appropriate to the material". Lubtchansky's cinematography varied in the films, and Rivette never developed the signature visual style of other directors. Kehr described Lubtchansky's work in Le Pont du Nord as "fluid, sunny images" and The Duchess of Langeais as having a "dark, heavy, almost Germanic manner". Ronald Bergan praised Lubtchansky's cinematography on Duelle and Noroît for its "fluid camerawork, superb long takes and an atmospheric use of understated blues and reds", and said that Lubtchansky was "attuned to the director's sudden, intuitive changes and improvisations". Rivette also worked with Lubtchansky's daughter, Irina, who was co-cinematographer on 36 vues du Pic Saint Loup. David Thomson wrote that Rivette "always preferred a camera style that has the best of two of his gods — the detachment and flow of Renoir, with the classical form and control of Fritz Lang".

== Legacy ==
Rivette is considered one of the more experimental of the French New Wave directors; during the 1970s, Godard said: "Someone like Rivette who knows cinema so much better than I, shoots seldom, so people don't speak of him ... if he had made 10 films he would have gone much farther than I". According to film critic Raphaël Bassan, Rivette was "the only filmmaker of the ex-New Wave—along with Godard—who keeps making truly personal work on the level of film, while his colleagues from the early days have long rejoined the ranks of the qualité française [mainstream French films]". Marc Chevrie called Rivette "vaguely legendary but largely unknown". Josh Kupecki of The Austin Chronicle sees his influence on the films of Spike Jonze and Michel Gondry. American poet John Ashbery called Out 1 "the greatest film ever made". He was awarded the Pardo d'onore for his career achievements at the 1991 Locarno International Film Festival. David Thomson, a longtime champion of Rivette's work, called him "one of the great directors working" and considered L'amour fou, Celine and Julie Go Boating and both versions of Out 1 "masterpieces" in 2001.

Céline and Julie Go Boating has influenced several films, according to Dennis Lim, including Susan Seidelman's Desperately Seeking Susan and Sara Driver's Sleepwalk. The film was referred to in Erick Zonca's 1998 The Dreamlife of Angels. That year Entertainment Weekly ranked it 99th on a list of 100 greatest films ever made, and Thomson called it "the most innovative film since Citizen Kane". Lim also saw the film's influence in the films of David Lynch, such as Lost Highway, Mulholland Drive and Inland Empire. In December 2015 the Film Society of Lincoln Center screened a retrospective that paired the film of Lynch and Rivette. The Lincoln Center wrote that their films both included "secrets, conspiracies, and paranoia; women in trouble; the supernatural manifesting itself within the everyday; the nature of performance and the stage as an arena for transformation; the uncanny sense of narrative as a puzzle without a solution, a force with a life of its own."

Rivette said that he admired John Cassavetes, Robert Altman and Alan Rudolph for their rapport with actors, and Peter Brook's theatrical work inspired him early in his career. In a 1998 interview with Les Inrockuptibles, the director was blunt about several films and filmmakers. He praised Rossellini's Europa 51, Charles Laughton's The Night of the Hunter, Lynch's Twin Peaks: Fire Walk with Me and Paul Verhoeven's Starship Troopers and Showgirls: "It has great sincerity and the script is very honest, guileless". Rivette criticized Michael Haneke's Funny Games, Chabrol's Rien ne va plus, Joseph L. Mankiewicz's All About Eve and James Cameron's Titanic: "Cameron isn't evil, he's not an asshole like Spielberg. He wants to be the new De Mille. Unfortunately, he can't direct his way out of a paper bag. On top of which the actress is awful, unwatchable".
