= The Taking of Power by Louis XIV =

1966 French television film by Roberto Rossellini

- French DVD cover
- Written by: Philippe Erlanger; Jean Gruault
- Directed by: Roberto Rossellini
- Starring: Jean-Marie Patte; Raymond Jourdan; Katharina Renn; Giulio Cesare Silvagni; Pierre Barrat
- Country of origin: France
- Original language: French

Production
- Producer: Roberto Rossellini
- Cinematography: Georges Leclerc
- Editor: Armand Ridel
- Running time: 100 min.

Original release
- Network: Première chaîne de l'ORTF
- Release: 1966

The Taking of Power by Louis XIV (French: La prise de pouvoir par Louis XIV), also called The Rise of Louis XIV, is a 1966 French television film directed by the Italian Roberto Rossellini and written by Philippe Erlanger and Jean Gruault. It describes how the young king Louis XIV and his lieutenant Jean-Baptiste Colbert restructured French politics and undermined their noble rivals to create an absolute monarchy. Richard Brody wrote that the film "traces the rise of modern French culture—indeed, of modern France—to very specific moments in the young king's struggle to preserve his fragile reign."

== Plot ==
For many years, Cardinal Mazarin has run France in the name of the 22-year-old Louis XIV. Mazarin has enough personal clout to run the country without interference from the royal family and the court. As Mazarin grows old, the court nobility await his death, assuming it will create a power vacuum that the king will not fill. Past kings have normally left the governing to the advisors and court. Since Louis is reputed for his laziness and womanizing, the nobles naturally expect him to do the same. However, Mazarin and Jean-Baptiste Colbert sense there is more to the king than meets the eye.

Louis is haunted by his memories of the Fronde, when the nobles rose against him. Louis, Mazarin, and Colbert all agree that the king's power must be strengthened, and the nobility's weakened. However, the nobles are still strong. Mazarin and the king know they must proceed in secret.

On his deathbed, Mazarin summons his confessor, Colbert, and the king. He admits his corruption to the priest, and resolves to leave a large sum to the state. He orders Colbert (who had been hoping for his blessing as his successor) to reconcile with his rival Nicolas Fouquet, the government's chief tax farmer. Even so, he hints to Louis that Colbert will be his most loyal and effective minister. Mazarin makes a show of offering to leave Louis a large fortune, which could help clear the government's debts, reducing the king's dependence on Fouquet. Louis makes a show of rejecting the money; Mazarin quietly leaves it to Louis anyway; and Louis gladly takes it.

Following Mazarin's death, Louis gradually sidelines his rivals at court. He reveals a talent for scheming. He insists on personally approving all decisions. The high councilors do not push back, as they expect the workload to break Louis. However, Louis secretly recruits Colbert to help him handle the paperwork. He also annoys his mother and refuses to appoint her to the high council, prompting her to quit politics in exasperation. Most importantly, Louis carefully outmaneuvers Fouquet. Instead of firing him immediately (as Colbert suggests), Louis encourages Fouquet to underestimate him by pretending to be obsessed with hunting and womanizing. After Fouquet clumsily attempts to bribe Louis’ mistress, Louis makes his move. He has Fouquet arrested and dismantles Fouquet’s power base in Angers.

Louis and Colbert also move to weaken the nobility as a force in French politics. They resolve to raise taxes on the nobles, (Note: Unsuccessfully, as it turned out. The French nobility generally did not pay taxes until the French Revolution. (See Estates of the realm#Second Estate.)) to reform the financial system, (Note: Better known as Colbertism.) and to centralize culture in the person of the king. (Note: See Louis XIV#Image and depiction.) Louis builds the Palace of Versailles. He entices the nobility to live there by offering them lavish accommodations and free rent. Once they arrive, he introduces elaborate ceremonies and dress codes to occupy the nobles’ attention and waste their money. By the end of the film, Louis eats an elaborate dinner by himself while the nobles submissively watch him, hand him his food, and supplicate for his favors. Louis retires to his apartment and muses on the nature of absolute power.

== Cast ==
- Jean-Marie Patte as King Louis XIV
- Raymond Jourdan as Jean-Baptiste Colbert
- Giulio Cesare Silvagni as Cardinal Mazarin
- Katharina Renn as Anne of Austria, Louis' mother
- Dominique Vincent as Suzanne, Marquise du Plessis-Bellière, Fouquet's ally at court
- Pierre Barrat as Nicolas Fouquet
- Fernand Fabre as Michel Le Tellier, Marquis of Barbezieux
- Françoise Ponty as Louise de la Vallière, Louis' mistress
- Joelle Laugeois as Maria Theresa of Spain, Louis' wife

== Development and themes ==
At the end of his career, celebrated director Roberto Rossellini decided to focus on historical films, most of which were made-for-TV. Unlike most of Rossellini's histories, however, Rossellini did not join the creative team of The Taking of Power by Louis XIV until relatively late in the process. The advanced progress of the film meant that Rossellini surrendered some creative control and "was forced to accept greater restrictions than he liked." Historians Philippe Erlanger and Jean-Dominique de la Rochefoucauld consulted on the project; Erlanger received a screenwriting credit, while Rochefoucauld served as an artistic advisor. The film was made cheaply and quickly; Rossellini shot the film in 23 days for $150,000.

In keeping with his neorealist style, Rossellini hired mostly non-professional actors; as director Paul Schrader put it, "[t]here is little 'acting' per se," and the actors "recite their lines rotely and without inflection." Jean-Marie Patte, who played the king, was an office clerk. (He later became a playwright and theater director.) Director Wes Anderson remarked that Patte "cannot give a convincing line reading ... yet he is fascinating." Critic Fernando Croce suggested that Patte's inexperience accurately reflected Louis' own "awkward" lack of experience at politics.

The film's style seeks to avoid overt editorialization. Even so, the film ambiently delivers its verdict, as it "hopes to draw a moral truth, not simply a factual truth." Derek Malcolm described the film as a "didactic reconstruction[] of history," emphasizing how "[t]he triumph of appearance over reality is apparent everywhere." Schrader notes that the falseness of the French court, exemplified by Mazarin putting on makeup to impress the king on his deathbed, is "nonetheless effective for being false." Croce adds that "Rossellini is less interested in simply illustrating historical facts ... than in contemplating a kingdom's rituals and how they can smother people." He believed that the end of the film showed that Louis finally "realize[d] that by mastering the 'appearances' he has also become their prisoner." John Powers said that the ending reveals that Louis' courtly splendor is not "true greatness," as Louis remains "a small, lonely nervous individual with nothing particularly grand about him." He felt that the ending used Louis to show "how vacant, even deathly, power can be when it's only about itself, when it's devoted to nothing but its own perpetuation."

== Reception ==
Upon its release, the film was "largely derided as a stolid and impersonal period piece." However, Paul Schrader wrote that by 1970 the film's reputation had improved significantly. In 1971, Vincent Canby wrote for The New York Times that Rossellini's historical films represented "the most fruitful years of his entire career" and that Rossellini's style had "become, with age, more pure, more austere, more simple than ever," reflecting the director's "impatien[ce] with superficial conventions." He concluded that while the historical films "seem[] almost artless," they also reflect Rossellini's efforts to "present without comment, without sentimentality or romance." In an essay for the Criterion Collection's release of the film, Colin McCabe of the University of Pittsburgh praised the film as "the most serious attempt by a great director to film history." He wrote that in addition to the political story of the king's grasp of power, the "incidental details, it can be argued, form the real subject matter of all of Rossellini's historical films."

Several commenters have singled out the closing sequence, with its grand banquet, for praise. Martin Scorsese said the film influenced his The Age of Innocence (1993), explaining that Rossellini taught him "that the more detail you see, the better you know the people ... In Louis XIV, he ties up the entire story in the presentation of a meal." He also cited the film as an influence on The 50 Year Argument (2014). McCabe agreed that the ending was "extraordinary," writing that "[w]e watch the dishes being prepared in a kitchen teeming with cooks, we follow the umpteenth platter as it is formally escorted through the corridors and staircases, until it reaches an enormous table, where the king sits alone, dining in front of his whole court." Richard Brody wrote that the ending "thrillingly dramatize[s] a political manifesto," and emphasized that "the rise of haute cuisine was intended to provide not just food fit for a king but food that only a king could afford," meaning that "absurd extravagance has been built into the gastronomical high arts from the start." He concluded that the film "traces the rise of modern French culture—indeed, of modern France—to very specific moments in the young king's struggle to preserve his fragile reign."

== Release ==
The Taking of Power by Louis XIV received a DVD release by The Criterion Collection in January 2009.
