= The Nun (1966 film) =

Film by Jacques Rivette

- Theatrical release poster
- French: La Religieuse
- Directed by: Jacques Rivette
- Screenplay by: Jean Gruault; Jacques Rivette
- Based on: La Religieuse by Denis Diderot
- Produced by: Georges de Beauregard
- Starring: Anna Karina; Liselotte Pulver; Micheline Presle; Francine Bergé
- Cinematography: Alain Levent
- Edited by: Denise de Casabianca
- Music by: Jean-Claude Éloy
- Production companies: Rome Paris Films; Société Nouvelle de Cinématographie
- Distributed by: Les Films Impéria
- Release dates: 6 May 1966 (Cannes); 26 July 1967 (France)
- Running time: 135 minutes
- Country: France
- Language: French

The Nun (French: La Religieuse; also known as French: Suzanne Simonin, la Religieuse de Denis Diderot) is a 1966 French drama film directed by Jacques Rivette from a screenplay he co-wrote with Jean Gruault, based on the novel of the same title by Denis Diderot.

== Plot ==
Suzanne, a young woman in a wedding gown, prepares to take her vows of chastity, obedience, and poverty and make herself a nun. However, she refuses at the last moment and instead begs her parents not to force her to take them.

This does not work, and later Suzanne learns much about her family and her heritage – or her lack thereof. She discovers that her mother's husband is not her father, and that her mother is shutting her up in the convent because she does not want her husband to know that the girl was not his daughter. She also does not want to see her sin in the flesh, for she says bearing the girl was her only sin. The father sends the priest to convince her, who reveals her heritage, but it fell on deaf ears. Later the mother falls on her knees to beg the daughter to take the vows, explaining the story enough to make Suzanne resign herself to her fate, realizing that her mother would never give her a chance to marry because the mother did not feel she was worthy to marry and the family could not afford to marry her off. According to the mother, she did not have the bloodline to marry. She writes her mother a letter that says she will take the vows, a letter that will later be used against her in the court case she wages against the church to be released of her vows.

Suzanne allows herself to be dressed in a wedding gown and takes the vows. She enters the convent, extremely depressed and unresponsive, unable to cope with the requirements of being a nun. She bonds to the Mother Superior, who takes her under her wing, and they have many long conversations. The Mother Superior, Mme de Moni, knows it is a mistake to accept the girl as a nun but does not stop it, instead telling the girl to accept her fate and make the best of it. Suzanne attempts to, which is made easier by Mme de Moni's encouragement, and does not utter more words but her body language reveals all. During this time, Suzanne's mother dies, and Mme de Moni does as well. She bears it until the life finally drives her mad, for the new Mother Superior, Sister Sainte-Christine, mistreats her because of her rebellion as a result of her dislike of the nun's life. She isolates her constantly and deprives her of food, forcing her to adopt a diet of bread and water.

Suzanne then sends her friend away with a letter to a lawyer. She wants to be free and absolved of her vows under the argument that everyone around her forced her to take the vows against her will: her mother, her father, the Mother Superior, etc. The lawyer, who becomes her biggest advocate against the religious orthodoxy enslaving her, informs her that while the case is pending, she will have to stay with Sister Sainte-Christine and endure the resulting persecution, but that either she will win or be transferred. Suzanne does not care, not truly understanding the depths of Sister Sainte-Christine' cruelty. While the case pends, Suzanne suffers many mistreatments under Sister Sainte-Christine, who steals her crucifix, forbids her to eat, forbids her to pray, forbids the other sisters to interact with or speak to her, and isolates her. She allows them to walk on the weakened, starving Suzanne after Mass. She is also whipped. They become convinced she is possessed, and Sister Sainte-Christine requests an exorcist. Officials arrive, see her mistreatment and understand that her devotion to God is not the way a possessed person would act, and investigate the mistreatment, which involves Sister Sainte-Christine's being reprimanded. After that, Sister Sainte-Christine lessens the punishment to only isolation but still treats her coldly.

When Suzanne discovers that the church has decided not to absolve her vows, she once again falls into a severe depression. Her lawyer apologizes and promises to keep in touch, although a church official forbids the contact. The same man later tells her that the church transferred her to another convent under the supervision of Mme de Chelles. In addition to long conversations about her thoughts and experiences, the light-hearted, fun, happy Mme de Chelles displays an attraction to and makes sexual advances towards Suzanne, which Suzanne never fully grasps. She meets a monk who attempts to comfort her by saying that he was forced into religion against his will as well. They develop a relationship and he later tells her that they must escape together. Suzanne goes with him, but flees from him when he forces kisses on her as soon as they are together which implies he desires more with her. Suzanne finds refuge nearby, working as a seamstress and doing chores for women. While there, she learns that the monk was caught and faces life in prison, same as she does. She cannot bear the thought of returning. She flees the small village she has taken refuge in and winds up begging on the street. A smart looking woman takes her to her home, but Suzanne does not understand it is a brothel and joins the girls who are dressing to entertain clients at a masked dinner party. As everybody takes their places, Suzanne realises what is involved. Crossing to the window, she asks God's forgiveness and jumps to her death.

== Cast ==
- Anna Karina – Suzanne Simonin
- Liselotte Pulver – Mme de Chelles
- Micheline Presle – Mme de Moni
- Francine Bergé – Sister Ste. Christine
- Francisco Rabal – Dom Morel
- Yori Bertin – Sister Ste. Thérèse
- Danielle Palmero – Sister Saint-Clément
- Catherine Diamant – Sister Ste. Cecile
- Christiane Lenier – Mme Simonin
- Wolfgang Reichmann – Father Lemoine

== Crew ==
- Jacques Rivette – screenwriter, director
- Georges de Beauregard – producer
- Jean-Jacques Fabri – art director
- Francoise Geissler – editor
- Harold Salemson – editor
- Denis Diderot – original author
- Jean-Claude Éloy – composer
- Jean Gruault – screenwriter
- Gitt Magrini – costume designer
- Denise de Casabianca – editor
- Alain Levent – cinematographer
- Marilù Parolini – set photographer

== Release and reception ==
Due to its sensitive depictions of high-authority Catholic figures, the film was petitioned against by an outraged public ahead of its completion in 1965, as well as condemned by the Catholic Church. The film was twice approved for release by the Censorship Board and both times blocked by the Minister of Information, Yvon Bourges, thus effectively banning the film temporarily from a theatrical release. Mention of the ban was itself banned on French TV. Elliott Stein, an American journalist living in Paris, reported in the British film magazine Sight and Sound that Le Monde ran a day-to-day feature, 'L’Affaire de La Religieuse', to which one opened as if to a daily horoscope or weather report".

Finally, in 1966, after a year of acrimony, the Minister of Culture André Malraux allowed La Religieuse to be shown at the Cannes Film Festival, where it received critical acclaim and a nomination for the Golden Palm Award. The praise allowed for a theatrical release in France, where it was met with much anticipation, despite earlier sentiment towards the subject matter. The film would go on to have a theatrical release in the United States in 1971.

== Re-release ==
In 2000, on 14 November, for the first time via home media, the film was released on VHS in the United States by Kino Lorber.

In 2018, L’Immagine Ritrovata Laboratory in Bologna, Italy, performed a 4K restoration from the original camera negative and re-released the film into select theaters in Europe and North America.

In 2018, on 17 September, the 4K restoration was released in Europe by StudioCanal on Region 2 DVD and Blu-ray.

In 2019, on 28 May, the 4K restoration of the film was released in the United States by Kino Lorber on Region 1 DVD and Blu-Ray.

== See also ==
- The Nun, a 2013 French film based on the same novel
- "La religieuse" (song)
