= Georges de Beauregard =

French film producer (1920–1984)

- Born: 23 December 1920; Marseille, France
- Died: 10 September 1984 (aged 63); Paris, France
- Occupation: Film producer
- Known for: Producing films of the French New Wave
- Awards: Special César Award (1983)

Georges de Beauregard (23 December 1920 Marseille – 10 September 1984 Paris) was a French film producer who produced works by many of the French New Wave directors. In 1968, he was a member of the jury at the 18th Berlin International Film Festival. In 1983 he was awarded a Special César Award, the French national film prize. The second place prize at the annual FIDMarseille film festival is named for de Beauregard.

== Selected filmography ==
- 1955 : Le Fugitif d'Anvers (El Fugitivo de Amberes), by Miguel Iglesias
- 1955 : Mort d'un cycliste (Muerte de un ciclista), by Juan Antonio Bardem
- 1956 : Grand-rue (Calle Mayor), by Juan Antonio Bardem
- 1958 : La Passe du diable, by Jacques Dupont and Pierre Schoendoerffer (documentaire)
- 1959 : Ramuntcho, by Pierre Schoendoerffer
- 1959 : Pêcheur d'Islande, by Pierre Schoendoerffer
- 1960 : Un steak trop cuit, by Luc Moullet (court-métrage)
- 1960 : À bout de souffle, by Jean-Luc Godard
- 1961 : Lola, by Jacques Demy
- 1961 : Une femme est une femme, by Jean-Luc Godard
- 1961 : Léon Morin, prêtre, by Jean-Pierre Melville
- 1962 : Cléo de 5 à 7, by Agnès Varda
- 1962 : L'Œil du Malin, by Claude Chabrol
- 1962 : Le Doulos, by Jean-Pierre Melville
- 1962 : Adieu Philippine, by Jacques Rozier
- 1963 : Le Petit Soldat, by Jean-Luc Godard
- 1963: Landru, by Claude Chabrol
- 1963 : Les Carabiniers, by Jean-Luc Godard
- 1963 : Le Mépris, by Jean-Luc Godard
- 1964 : La Chance et l'amour, by Claude Berri, Charles L. Bitsch, Jean-François Hauduroy, Bertrand Tavernier and Bernard Toublanc-Michel
- 1964 : Six Femmes pour l'assassin (Sei donne per l'assassino) by Mario Bava
- 1965 : La 317e Section, by Pierre Schoendoerffer
- 1965 : Marie-Chantal contre le docteur Kha, by Claude Chabrol
- 1965 : Pierrot le fou, by Jean-Luc Godard
- 1965 : Le Vampire de Düsseldorf by Robert Hossein
- 1966 : Suzanne Simonin, la Religieuse de Diderot, by Jacques Rivette
- 1966 : La Ligne de démarcation, by Claude Chabrol
- 1966 : Objectif 500 millions, by Pierre Schoendoerffer
- 1966 : Made in USA, by Jean-Luc Godard
- 1967 : Lamiel, by Jean Aurel
- 1967 : La Collectionneuse, by Éric Rohmer
- 1969 : L'Amour fou, by Jacques Rivette
- 1969 : Quarante-huit heures d'amour, by Jacques Laurent
- 1970 : Le Petit Bougnat, by Bernard Toublanc-Michel
- 1970 : Le Mur de l'Atlantique, by Marcel Camus
- 1972 : Le Bar de la fourche, by Alain Levent
- 1973 : Prêtres interdits, by Denys de La Patellière
- 1974 : Gross Paris, by Gilles Grangier
- 1975 : Numéro deux, by Jean-Luc Godard
- 1976 : Comment ça va, by Jean-Luc Godard (coréalisé with Anne-Marie Miéville)
- 1977 : Encore un Hiver, court-métrage by Françoise Sagan
- 1977 : Les Fougères bleues by Françoise Sagan
- 1977 : Le Crabe-tambour, by Pierre Schoendoerffer
- 1980 : La Légion saute sur Kolwezi, by Raoul Coutard
- 1980 : Tout dépend des filles..., by Pierre Fabre
- 1980 : Le Cheval d'orgueil, by Claude Chabrol
- 1982 : L'Honneur d'un capitaine, by Pierre Schoendoerffer
- 1982 : Arms, by Philippe Charigot (court-métrage)
