= William Lubtchansky =

French cinematographer

- Born: 26 October 1937; Vincennes, France
- Died: 4 May 2010 (aged 72); Paris, France
- Occupation: Cinematographer
- Relatives: Jean-Claude Lubtchansky (brother)

William Lubtchansky (26 October 1937 – 4 May 2010) was a French cinematographer.

== Biography ==
Lubtchansky's first film was Agnès Varda's 1965 short, Elsa la Rose. He shot over 100 films, including several for Jean-Luc Godard, Jacques Rivette, Jean Marie Straub and Danièle Huillet and Nadine Trintignant. He has also worked with Philippe Garrel, François Truffaut, Marcel Camus and Peter Brook (for the 1989 6-hour version of The Mahabharata). He won the Golden Osella for Regular Lovers. Lubtchansky died in Paris, France, on 4 May 2010 from heart disease.

== Selected filmography ==
- Time to Live (1969)
- It Only Happens to Others (1971)
- Violins at the Ball (1974)
- Speak to Me of Love (1975)
- Noroît (1976)
- Here and Elsewhere (1976)
- Duelle (1976)
- The Woman Next Door (1981)
- Neige (1981)
- Le Pont du Nord (1981)
- Cap Canaille (1983)
- Love on the Ground (1984)
- Class Relations (1984)
- After Darkness (1985)
- I Love You (1986)
- Agent trouble (1987)
- Black Sin (1989)
- The Mahabharata (1989)
- The Little Gangster (1990)
- La Belle Noiseuse (1991)
- La Chasse aux papillons (1992)
- Le Nouveau monde (1995)
- Tell Me I'm Dreaming (1998)
- Top Secret (1998)
- Sicilia! (1999)
- Farewell, Home Sweet Home (1999)
- Va savoir (2001)
- The Story of Marie and Julien (2003)
- Regular Lovers (2005)
- The Duchess of Langeais (2007)
- Frontier of the Dawn (2008)
