= Jean Gruault =

French screenwriter

- Born: 3 August 1924; Fontenay-sous-Bois, Val-de-Marne, France
- Died: 8 June 2015 (aged 90); Paris, France
- Occupations: Screenwriter; Actor
- Years active: 1958–1995

Jean Gruault (3 August 1924 – 8 June 2015) was a French screenwriter and actor. He wrote 25 films between 1960 and 1995. He was nominated for an Academy Award for Academy Award for Best Original Screenplay for the 1980 film Mon oncle d'Amérique.

== Selected filmography ==
- Paris Belongs to Us (1960)
- Vanina Vanini (1961)
- Jules et Jim (1962)
- The Nun (1966)
- Two English Girls (1971)
- The Story of Adèle H. (1975)
- Mon oncle d'Amérique (1980)
- Via degli specchi (1982)
