= Noroît (film) =

1976 film by Jacques Rivette

- Directed by: Jacques Rivette
- Written by: Eduardo de Gregorio; Marilù Parolini; Jacques Rivette
- Based on: The Revenger's Tragedy by Thomas Middleton
- Produced by: Stéphane Tchalgadjieff
- Starring: Geraldine Chaplin; Bernadette Lafont
- Cinematography: William Lubtchansky
- Edited by: Nicole Lubtchansky
- Music by: Jean Cohen-Solal; Robert Cohen-Solal; Daniel Ponsard
- Release date: 1976
- Running time: 135 min (Arrow Blu-Ray)
- Country: France
- Language: French

Noroît (Une vengeance) is a 1976 experimental adventure fantasy drama directed by Jacques Rivette. The title is an alteration of nord-ouest (north-west), meaning the direction or the wind from that direction (in English, a "nor'wester"). The story is loosely based on Thomas Middleton's The Revenger's Tragedy. The film stars Geraldine Chaplin and Bernadette Lafont as pirates. Noroît would have followed Duelle (1976) as the third episode of the intended four-film series Scènes de la vie parallèle (the first being a supernatural love story and the fourth a musical).

== Plot ==
On a beach, Morag (Chaplin) weeps over the lifeless corpse of her brother, Shane and vows to avenge his death. Shane was killed by Giulia (Lafont), the leader of a band of pirates that inhabit the island's castle. Amongst Giulia's band are three men, Jacob, Ludovico and Arno. Morag enlists Erika to be a spy in the pirate's castle and she is employed by Giulia as a bodyguard. Giulia's pirate gang attack a boat and Erika attempts to use the distraction as an opportunity for Morag to stab Giulia. However, the plot fails when Morag is hesitant; the boat attack continues and Jacob is injured.

Morag uses her dead brother's body as a trap to ensnare another Giulia ally, Regina. She pours poison on the lips of Shane and leaves him in Jacob's bed. Erika and Morag organize a theater where they mimic the scenario of Regina's death. In a rage by the turn of events, Giulia kills a pirate. She then decides to send Jacob to seduce Erika. Meanwhile, Ludovico attempts to discover the location of hidden treasure. Morag is betrayed by Erika and stabs her. At a masked ball hosted by Giulia, Morag decides to attend and finally avenge Shane. In the battle of the two women, they kill each other.

== Cast ==
- Geraldine Chaplin as Morag
- Bernadette Lafont as Giulia
- Kika Markham as Erika
- Humbert Balsan as Jakob
- Larrio Ekson as Ludovico
- Anne-Marie Reynaud as Arno
- Babette Lamy as Regina
- Danièle Rosencranz as Celia
- Élisabeth Lafont as Elisa
- Carole Laurenty as Charlotte
- Anne-Marie Fijal as Fiao
- Marie-Christine Meynard as Tony
- Anne Bedou as Romain
- Georges Gatecloud as Arno's brother

== Production ==
The film was shot in 1975 in Brittany in a 15th-century chateau and round a 12th-century coastal fortress.

The stylistic model for the film was based on Fritz Lang's Moonfleet.

The music was improvised.

== Release ==
The film was screened at the London Film Festival on 17 November 1976.

== Reception ==
Prior to the screening at the London Film Festival, it was noted that the only responses at the time were that it made Duelle seem like a B-film and that the film is "very, very strange - hard to describe and harder to classify".
