= Duelle =

1976 film by Jacques Rivette

- Theatrical release poster
- Directed by: Jacques Rivette
- Written by: Eduardo de Gregorio (Note: Screenplay and dialogue); Marilù Parolini (Note: Screenplay); Jacques Rivette (Note: Mise-en-scène)
- Produced by: Stéphane Tchalgadjieff
- Starring: Juliet Berto; Bulle Ogier
- Cinematography: William Lubtchansky
- Edited by: Nicole Lubtchansky
- Production companies: Sunchild; Les Productions Jacques Roitfeld; INA
- Distributed by: Gaumont Distribution
- Release dates: 23 May 1976 (Cannes); 15 September 1976 (France)
- Running time: 121 minutes
- Country: France
- Language: French

Duelle (Une quarantaine) is a 1976 French experimental fantasy drama film directed by Jacques Rivette. The main title is a neologistic feminine form for the noun "duel". The director-assigned English title is Twhylight, a combination of "twilight" and "why". The film stars Juliet Berto as the Queen of the Night who battles the Queen of the Sun (Bulle Ogier) over a magical diamond that will allow the winner to remain on earth, specifically modern-day Paris.

== Cast ==
- Juliet Berto as Leni
- Bulle Ogier as Viva
- Jean Babilée as Pierrot
- Hermine Karagheuz as Lucie (hotel receptionist)
- Nicole Garcia as Jeanne / Elsa
- Claire Nadeau as Sylvia Stern
- Elisabeth Wiener as Viva's ally
- Jean Wiener as the pianist
- André Dauchy as the accordionist
- Roger Fugen as the drummer

== Production ==
The film was the second in a planned quartet but the first to be filmed. It was followed by Noroît.

The stylistic model for the film was based on Val Lewton's The Seventh Victim.

The music, by pianist Jean Wiener, was improvised.
