= L'Amour fou (1969 film) =

1969 film by Jacques Rivette

- Directed by: Jacques Rivette
- Written by: Marilù Parolini; Jacques Rivette
- Produced by: Georges de Beauregard
- Starring: Bulle Ogier; Jean-Pierre Kalfon
- Cinematography: Étienne Becker; Alain Levent
- Edited by: Nicole Lubtchansky
- Music by: Jean-Claude Éloy
- Distributed by: Cocinor
- Release date: 15 January 1969
- Running time: 245 minutes
- Country: France
- Language: French

L'Amour fou is a 1969 French romantic drama film directed by Jacques Rivette, who co-wrote the script with Marilù Parolini.

== Plot ==
L'Amour fou follows the dissolution of the marriage between Claire, an actress (played by Bulle Ogier), and Sebastien, her director (Jean-Pierre Kalfon). It is black and white with two different film gauges (35 mm and 16 mm) employed at different times throughout the film. The film focuses on a long cycle of self-destruction in Claire and Sebastien's relationship.

The central event in the film's narrative is a three-week period of preparation by a theater group for a production of Racine's version of Andromaque. A crew films the preparations of the theater company in handheld 16 mm, while the rest of the film is shot in 35 mm. This framework allows Rivette to focus on the act of direction, in the formation of an artwork and the dissolution of a relationship.

== Significance ==
The film is pivotal in Rivette's career as a precursor to his vast 12+ hour opus Out 1 which followed two years later.

== Cast ==
- Bulle Ogier - Claire
- Jean-Pierre Kalfon - Sébastien-Pyrrhus
- André S. Labarthe - The director
- Josée Destoop - Marta-Hermione
- Dennis Berry - Dennis-Pylade
- Michèle Moretti - Michèle
