= Marilù Parolini =

Italian photographer and screenwriter

- Born: Maria Ludovica Parolini; 18 September 1931; Cremona, Italy
- Died: 21 April 2012 (aged 80); Castell’Arquato, Italy
- Occupations: Photographer, screenwriter
- Years active: 1957–1992
- Spouse: Jacques Rivette (divorced)

Maria Ludovica (Marilù) Parolini (1931–2012) was an Italian photographer and screenwriter.

Parolini moved to Paris in 1957 and worked as a secretary at Cahiers du cinéma from 1960 to 1962. There she met members of the French New Wave and worked as a set photographer for Jean-Luc Godard, François Truffaut, Jacques Rivette and Agnès Varda, taking some of the most iconic photographs of the New Wave. During this period, she appeared in Jean Rouch and Edgar Morin's cinéma vérité documentary Chronique d'un été (1961).

She later returned to Italy and worked with Pier Paolo Pasolini and Bernardo Bertolucci, with whom she also collaborated as a screenwriter. She also worked with directors Jean-Marie Straub and Danièle Huillet. She was married to Rivette and collaborated on his improvisational scripts on several films, including L'amour fou (1969), Duelle and Noroît (both 1976). They later divorced but maintained their professional relationship.

Parolini was the subject of the documentary L'amica delle rondini (Friend of the Swallows, 2009).
