= Portrait of Ambroise Vollard =

Portrait of Ambroise Vollard may refer to:

- Portrait of Ambroise Vollard (Cézanne), an 1899 oil-on-canvas portrait by Paul Cézanne
- Portrait of Ambroise Vollard (Picasso), a 1910 oil-on-canvas portrait by Pablo Picasso
- Portrait of Ambroise Vollard with a Cat, an oil-on-canvas painting by Pierre Bonnard
- Portrait of Ambroise Vollard in a Red Headscarf, an oil on canvas portrait by Pierre-Auguste Renoir
