= List of artists who have created a Château Mouton Rothschild label =

This page lists, by year, the artists that have designed the label of the Château Mouton Rothschild. This wine introduced the concept of artist labels in the wine industry.

== Background ==
Baron Philippe de Rothschild came up with the idea of having each year's Château Mouton Rothschild label designed by a famous artist of the day. He started with Jean Carlu in 1924, but eventually dropped the idea when he faced a wave of critics regarding his novel idea. In 1946, this became a permanent and significant aspect of the Mouton image, but the illustrations were often informal, quickly drafted by the artists, sometimes on a table napkin. In 1955, Georges Braque asked to design the next wine's label, and the wine's label went on to be designed by famous international artists since then.

In the words of Julien de Beaumarchais de Rothschild, “The artist must be like Mouton: an extremely well-known artist who does not need Mouton to promote his or her art”.

Once, on a trip to the USA, Philippine de Rothschild saw that wealthy collectors of Château Mouton Rothschild had enlarged the bottles' labels and were displaying them in their houses' hallway. This gave the idea to the Baroness to organize, starting in 1981, fully-fledged exhibitions of the wine labels. A permanent exhibition was created in 2013 at the château.

The popularity of the label images results in auction prices for older and more collectible years being far out of sync with the other first growths, whose labels do not change year to year.

== List ==
- 1924: Jean Carlu (the first time a commercial artist designed a wine label)
- 1945: Philippe Jullian ("The Year of Victory")
- 1946: Jean Hugo
- 1947: Jean Cocteau
- 1948: Marie Laurencin
- 1949: André Dignimont
- 1950: Arnulf
- 1951: Marcel Vertès
- 1952: Léonor Fini
- 1953: Centenary year commemoration
- 1954: Jean Carzou
- 1955: Georges Braque (first famous international artist to design the label)
- 1956: Pavel Tchelitchew
- 1957: André Masson
- 1958: Salvador Dalí
- 1959: Richard Lippold
- 1960: Jacques Villon
- 1961: Georges Mathieu
- 1962: Matta
- 1963: Bernard Dufour
- 1964: Henry Moore
- 1965: Dorothea Tanning
- 1966: Pierre Alechinsky
- 1967: César
- 1968: Bona
- 1969: Joan Miró
- 1970: Marc Chagall
- 1971: Wassily Kandinsky
- 1972: Serge Poliakoff
- 1973: Pablo Picasso (posthumous recognition – in memoriam, as he had died in Mougins in April of that year. Also the year Château Mouton Rothschild became first-growth)
- 1974: Robert Motherwell
- 1975: Andy Warhol
- 1976: Pierre Soulages
- 1977: Tribute to Queen Elizabeth The Queen Mother, who stayed at the chateau in April 1977
- 1978: Jean-Paul Riopelle (2 labels)
- 1979: Hisao Domoto
- 1980: Hans Hartung
- 1981: Arman
- 1982: John Huston
- 1983: Saul Steinberg
- 1984: Agam
- 1985: Paul Delvaux
- 1986: Bernard Séjourné
- 1987: Hans Erni
- 1988: Keith Haring
- 1989: Georg Baselitz
- 1990: Francis Bacon
- 1991: Setsuko
- 1992: Per Kirkeby
- 1993: Balthus (2 labels. The first label had been banned in the US because it depicted a naked young woman and the press kit explained "The fragile and mysterious girl . . . seems to hint at some secret promise of undiscovered pleasure, a pleasure to be shared")
- 1994: Karel Appel
- 1995: Antoni Tàpies
- 1996: Gu Gan
- 1997: Niki de Saint Phalle
- 1998: Rufino Tamayo
- 1999: Raymond Savignac
- 2000: Special gold enamel relief of the "Augsburg Ram" in the Mouton museum
- 2001: Robert Wilson
- 2002: Ilya Kabakov
- 2003: 150th Birthday Tribute
- 2004: Charles, Prince of Wales
- 2005: Giuseppe Penone
- 2006: Lucian Freud
- 2007: Bernar Venet
- 2008: Xu Lei
- 2009: Anish Kapoor
- 2010: Jeff Koons
- 2011: Guy de Rougemont
- 2012: Miquel Barcelo
- 2013: Lee Ufan
- 2014: David Hockney
- 2015: Gerhard Richter
- 2016: William Kentridge
- 2017: Annette Messager
- 2018: Xu Bing
- 2019: Olafur Eliasson
- 2020: Peter Doig
- 2021: Chiharu Shiota
- 2022: Gérard Garouste
- 2023: Joana Vasconcelos
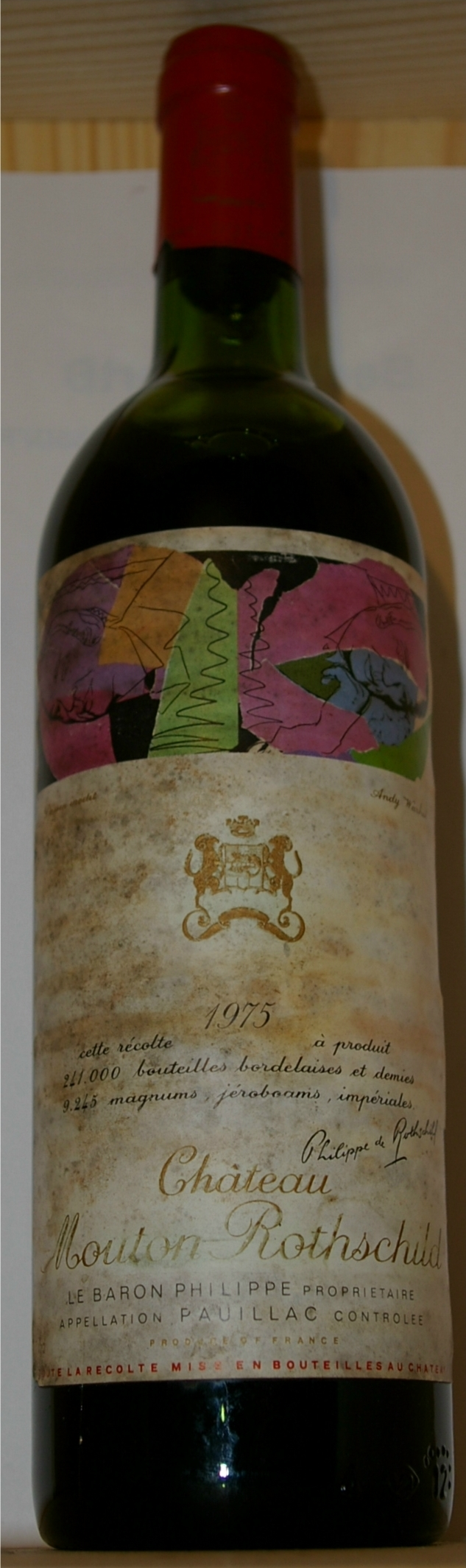
1975

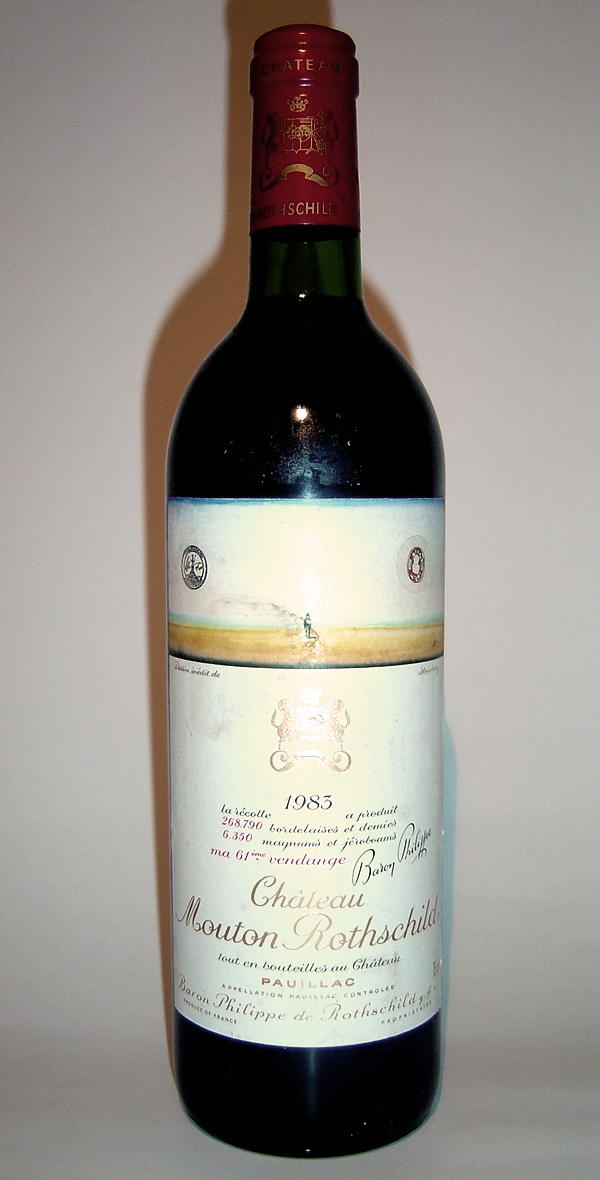
1983

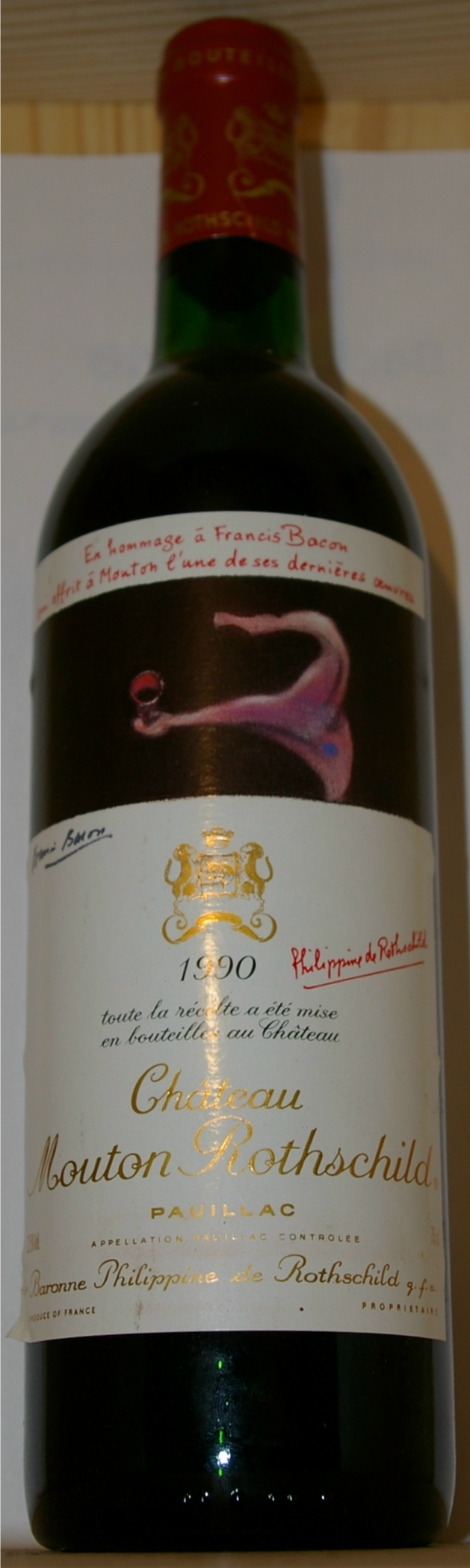
1990

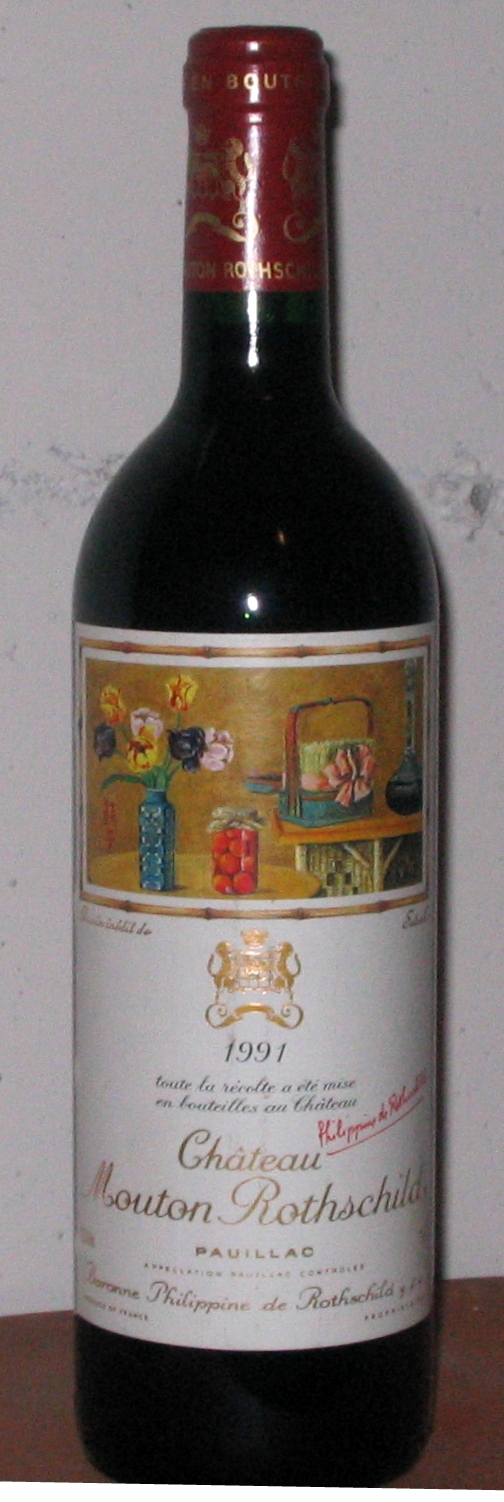
1991

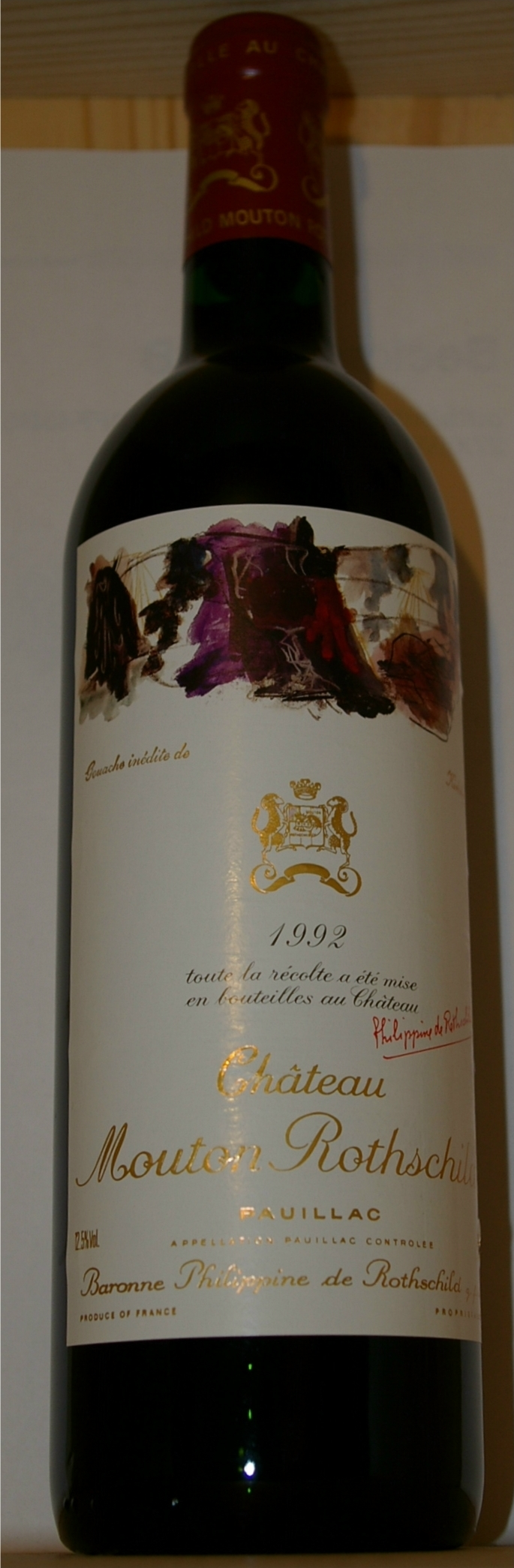
1992

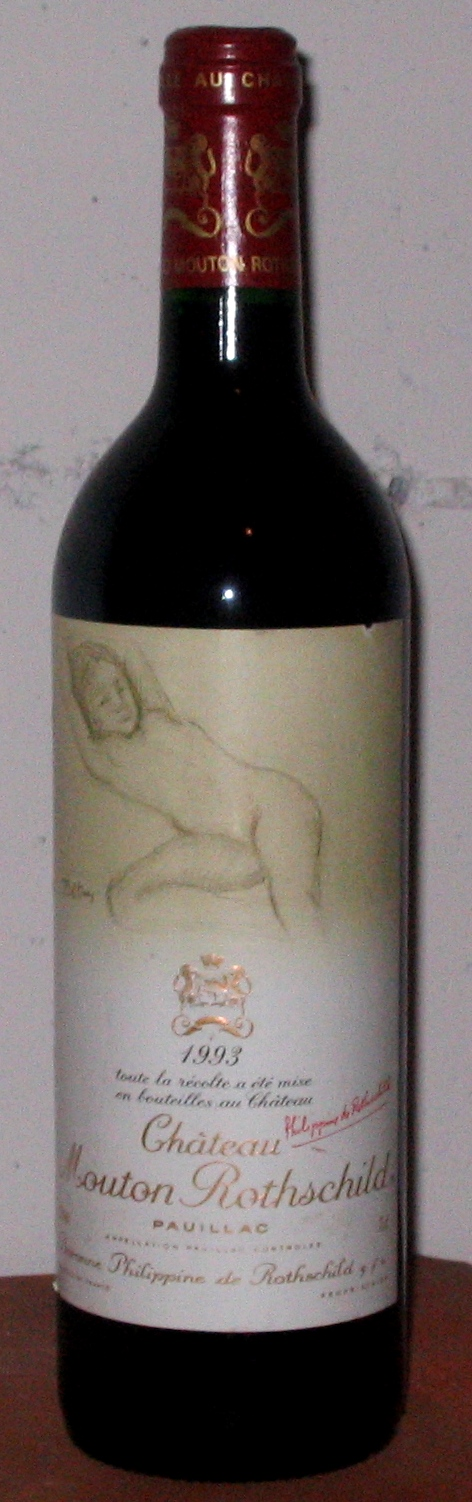
1993

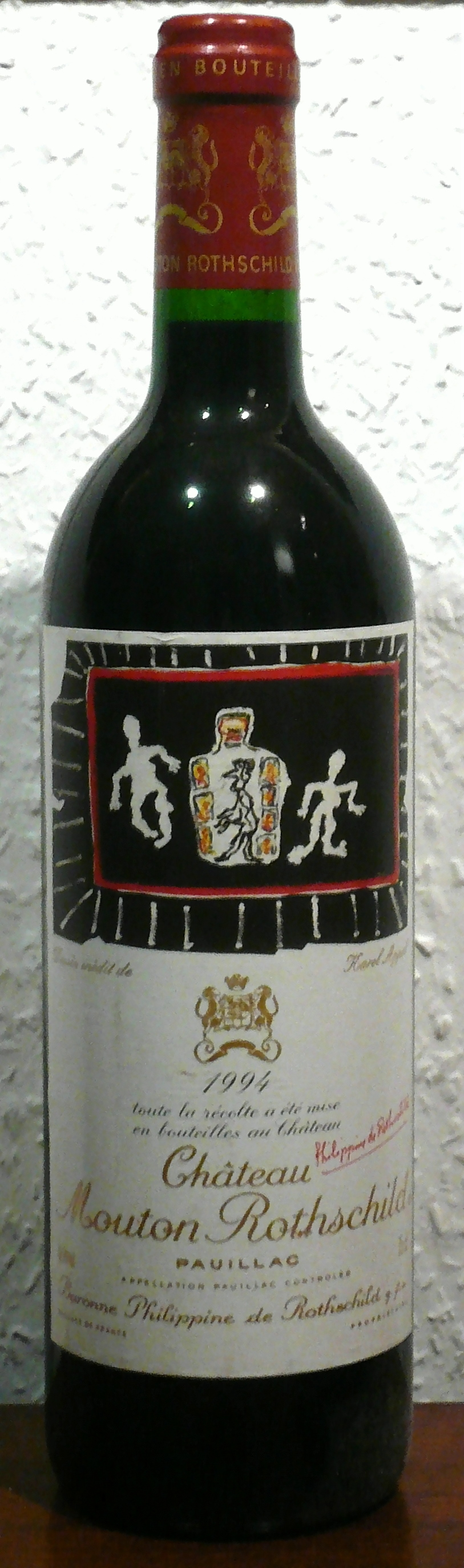
1994

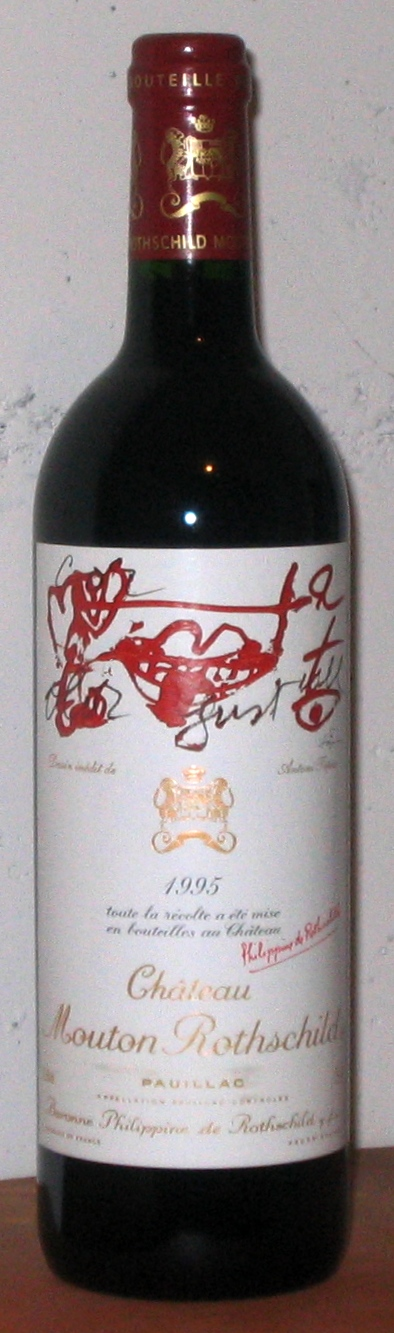
1995

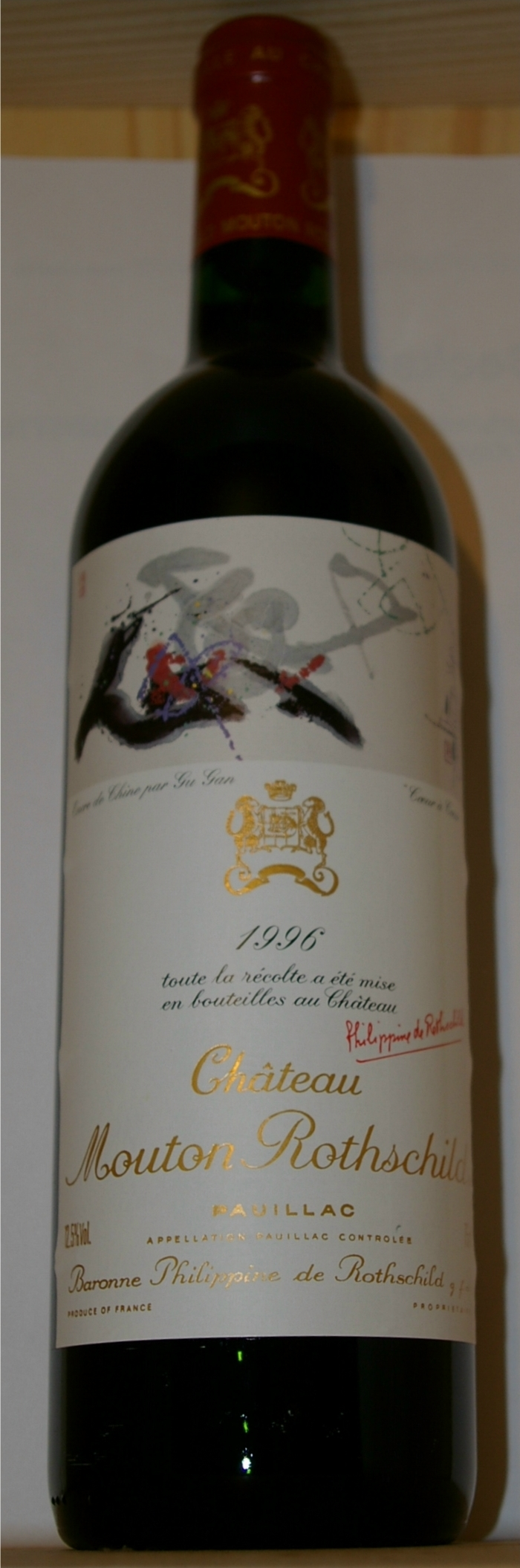
1996

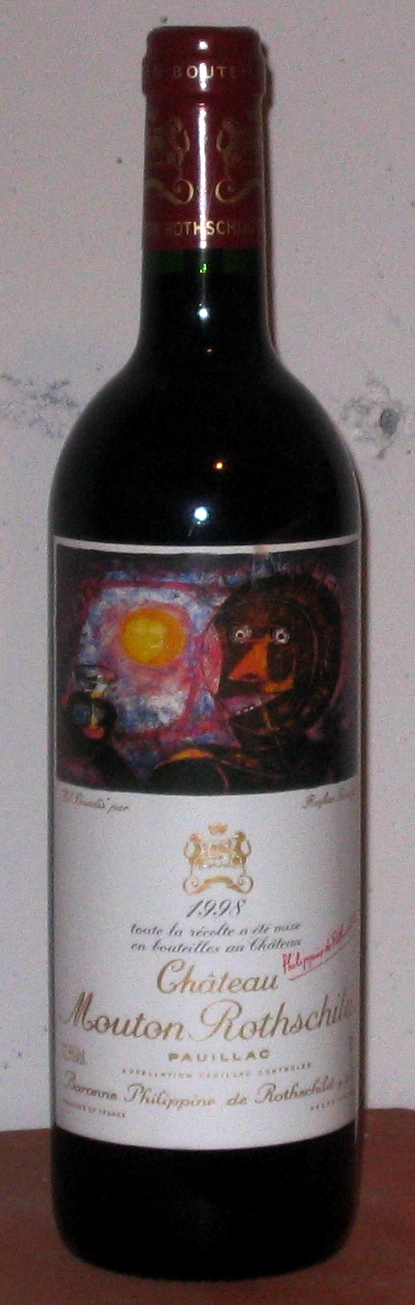
1998

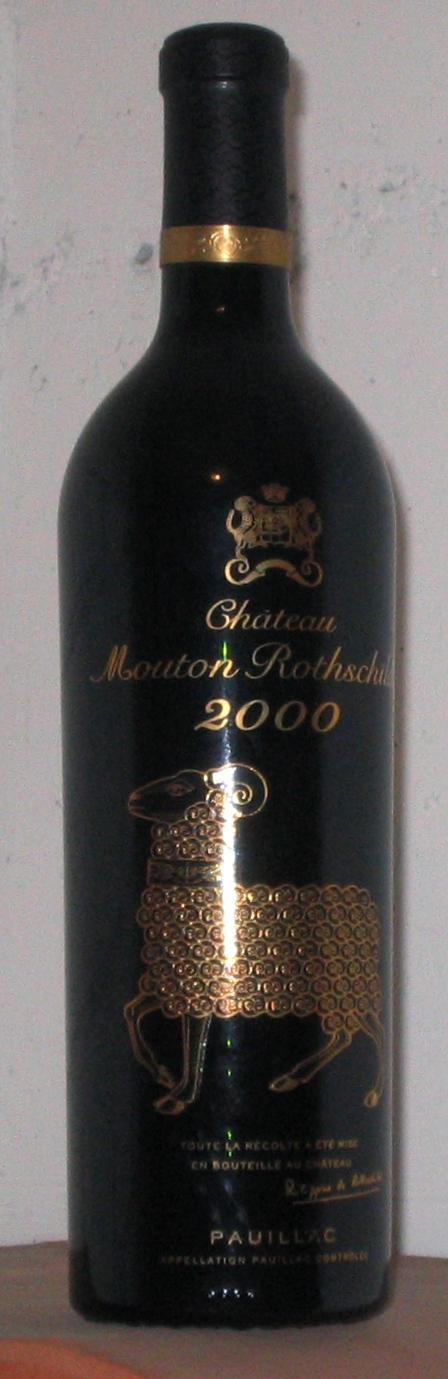
2000
