= Ambroise Vollard =

French art dealer (1866–1939)

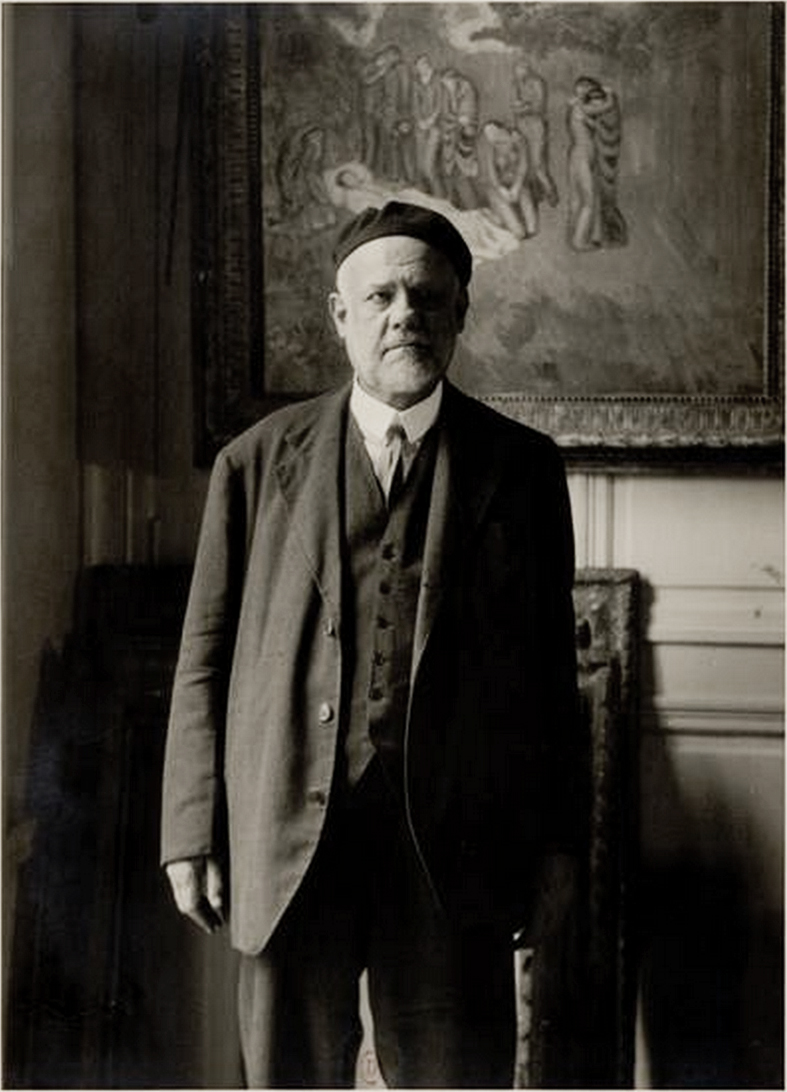
- Vollard, in front of Picasso's Evocación. El entierro de Casagemas
- Born: 3 July 1866; Saint-Denis, Réunion
- Died: 21 July 1939 (aged 73); Versailles, France
- Occupation: Art dealer

Ambroise Vollard (French pronunciation: [ɑ̃bʁwaz vɔlaʁ]; 3 July 1866 – 21 July 1939) was a French art dealer who is regarded as one of the most important dealers in French contemporary art at the beginning of the twentieth century. He is credited with being a major supporter and champion of the contemporary artists of his period, providing exposure and emotional support to numerous then-unknown artists, including Paul Cézanne, Aristide Maillol, Pierre-Auguste Renoir, Louis Valtat, Pablo Picasso, André Derain, Georges Rouault, Paul Gauguin, and Vincent van Gogh.

He was also an avid art collector and publisher, especially of print series by leading artists.

== Biography ==
Born in Saint-Denis, Réunion, he was raised in the French Indian Ocean colony. After his baccalauréat (final exams) in La Réunion, he went to study jurisprudence in France from 1885, for a while in Montpellier, then at the École de droit in Paris, where he received his degree in 1888.

During his studies, Vollard converted himself into an "amateur-merchant" by becoming a clerk for an art dealer, and in 1893 established his own art gallery, at Rue Laffitte, then the center of the Parisian market for contemporary art. There Vollard mounted his first major exhibitions, buying almost the entire output of Cézanne, some 150 canvases, to create his first exhibition in 1895. This was followed by exhibitions of Manet, Gauguin and Vincent van Gogh (4 – 30 June 1895); for Gabriel Mourey, French correspondent of The Studio in Paris, this was simply a matter of "Scylla and Charybdis". These were followed by a second Cézanne exhibition (1898), the first Picasso exhibition (1901) and a Matisse exhibition (1904).

Much has been made of his physical appearance and countenance (grimly described as a "large, gruff, boorish fellow" with "downcast eyes..."); however, he was also a very shrewd businessman who made a fortune with the "buy low, sell high" mantra. His clients included Albert C. Barnes, Henry Osborne Havemeyer, Gertrude Stein and her brother, Leo Stein. A digital archive consisting of materials from the Galérie Vollard (1893–1939) and the archives of his publishing house Ambroise Vollard, éditeur (1895–1939) was published online by the Wildenstein Plattner Institute.

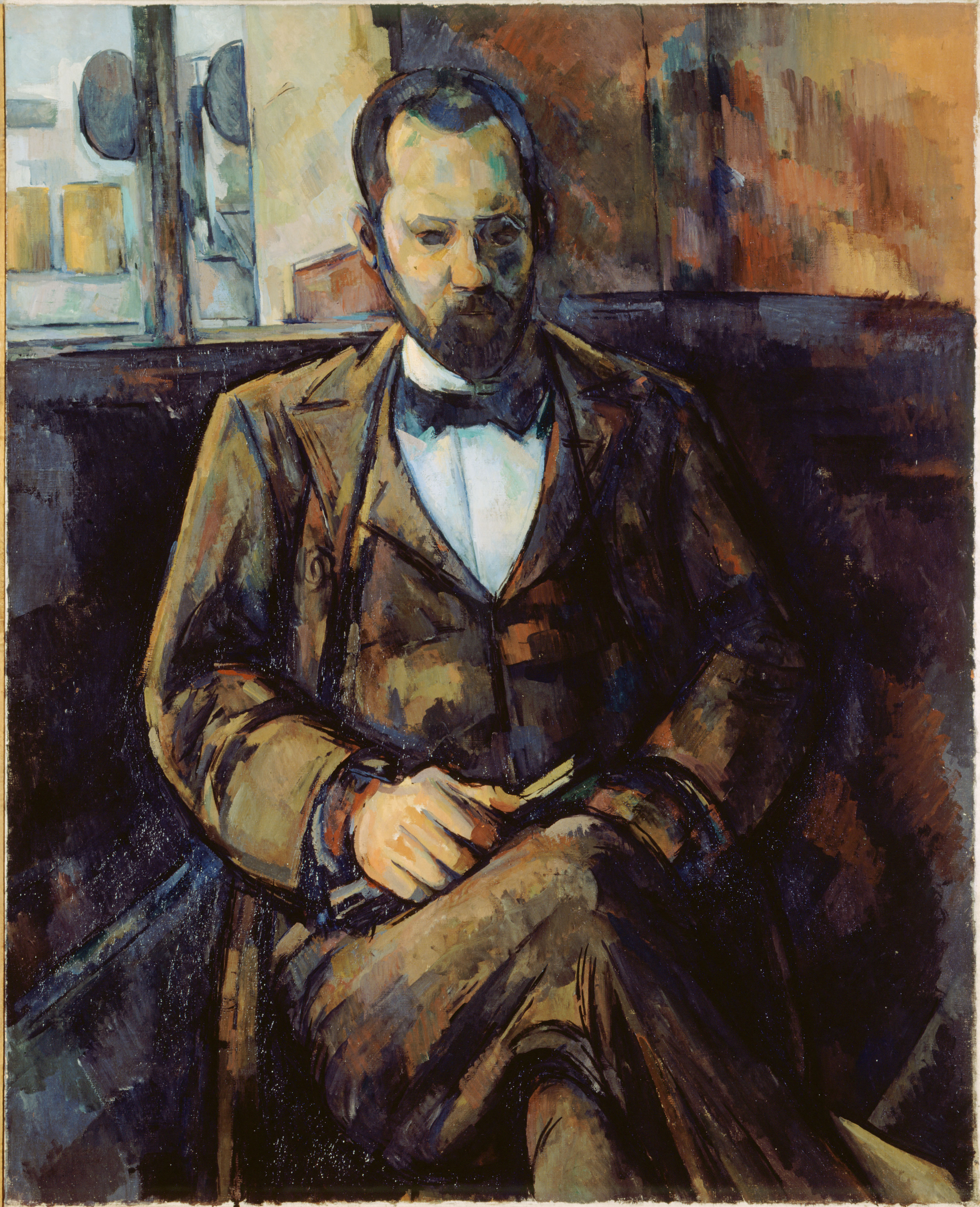
Paul Cézanne, Portrait of Ambroise Vollard, 1899. Musée des Beaux-Arts

Having put on the first Picasso exhibition, in 1930 Vollard commissioned Picasso to produce a suite of 100 etchings which became known as the Vollard Suite. An earlier Vollard Suite was commissioned from Paul Gauguin in 1898–99, a smaller group in woodcut and monotype, which Vollard did not like.

Vollard would later write biographies of Cézanne (1914), Degas, and Renoir. In 1937 he published his autobiography, Recollections of a Picture Dealer.

== Publisher of prints ==
In 1890 Vollard opened a gallery in Paris, where he exhibited the work of artists such as Paul Gauguin, Henri Matisse, Paul Cézanne and Pierre-Auguste Renoir. In 1901 he organized the first exhibition of works by Pablo Picasso. Vollard was especially concerned with promoting the work of marginal artists, artists rejected by the official salons. His success in the sale of paintings allowed him to subsidize editions of prints purely out of personal interest, since they rarely brought him profits. He was also concerned about the quality of the productions, always trying to have the best materials and the best technicians: for lithography he relied especially on Blanchard, for woodcuts on Tony Beltrand and for etchings and engravings on Louis Fort. Among his collaborators, Auguste Clot stands out, an expert printmaker who knew how to remain in the shadow of the artists but whose technical work was indispensable to achieve the quality levels of the albums published by Vollard, with whom he collaborated for thirty years.

Most of Vollard's production focused on limited editions for collectors, made by the best artists of the day. His first editions were based on prints purchased from artists that had already been printed or published, for example the Gauguin zincographs exhibited at the Café Volpini in 1889, which Clot printed again in 1894. But from then on he devoted himself above all to directly commissioning artists to provide him with prints: such was the case of his first album, Quelques Aspects de la Vie de Paris, by Pierre Bonnard, produced in 1895 in Clot's workshop, of which one hundred numbered impressions were published and signed by the artist. The following year he published L'Album des peintres-graveurs, in which artists such as Albert Besnard, Jacques Émile Blanche, Pierre Bonnard, Maurice Denis, Henri Fantin-Latour, Armand Guillaumin, Hermann-Paul, Edvard Munch, Odilon Redon, Pierre-Auguste Renoir, József Rippl-Rónai, Théo van Rysselberghe, Jan Toorop, Félix Vallotton and Édouard Vuillard. In the second album, in 1897, some of these artists repeated, and participated for the first time Edmond Aman-Jean, Eugène Carrière, Paul Cézanne, Georges de Feure, Eugène Grasset, Henri Martin, Lucien Pissarro, Pierre Puvis de Chavannes, Auguste Rodin, Ker-Xavier Roussel, Alfred Sisley, Henri de Toulouse-Lautrec and James McNeill Whistler.

Another field of publishing for Vollard was the illustrated book for bibliophiles, of which he promoted twenty-two projects between 1900 and 1939. Vollard always selected the artist, whom he sometimes let select the text he would like to illustrate. His first edition was Parallèlement by Paul Verlaine, illustrated by Pierre Bonnard, which was a commercial failure, as was the next, Daphnis and Chloe, also by Bonnard. Made in lithography, for the next edition he opted for the woodcut, more appreciated by collectors: Imitation of Christ, illustrated by Maurice Denis, was a sales success. Among his subsequent editions, the following stand out: Les Amours by Pierre de Ronsard (1915, Émile Bernard), Les Fleurs du mal by Charles Baudelaire (1916, Bernard), Œuvres de maistre François Villon (1919, Bernard), Les Petites Fleurs de Saint François (1928, Bernard), Les âmes mortes by Nikolai Gogol (1924-1925, Marc Chagall), Les Fables by La Fontaine (1926-1931, Chagall), La Belle Enfant ou L'Amour à quarante ans by Eugène Montfort (1930, Raoul Dufy), L'Ancien Testament (1931-1939, Chagall).

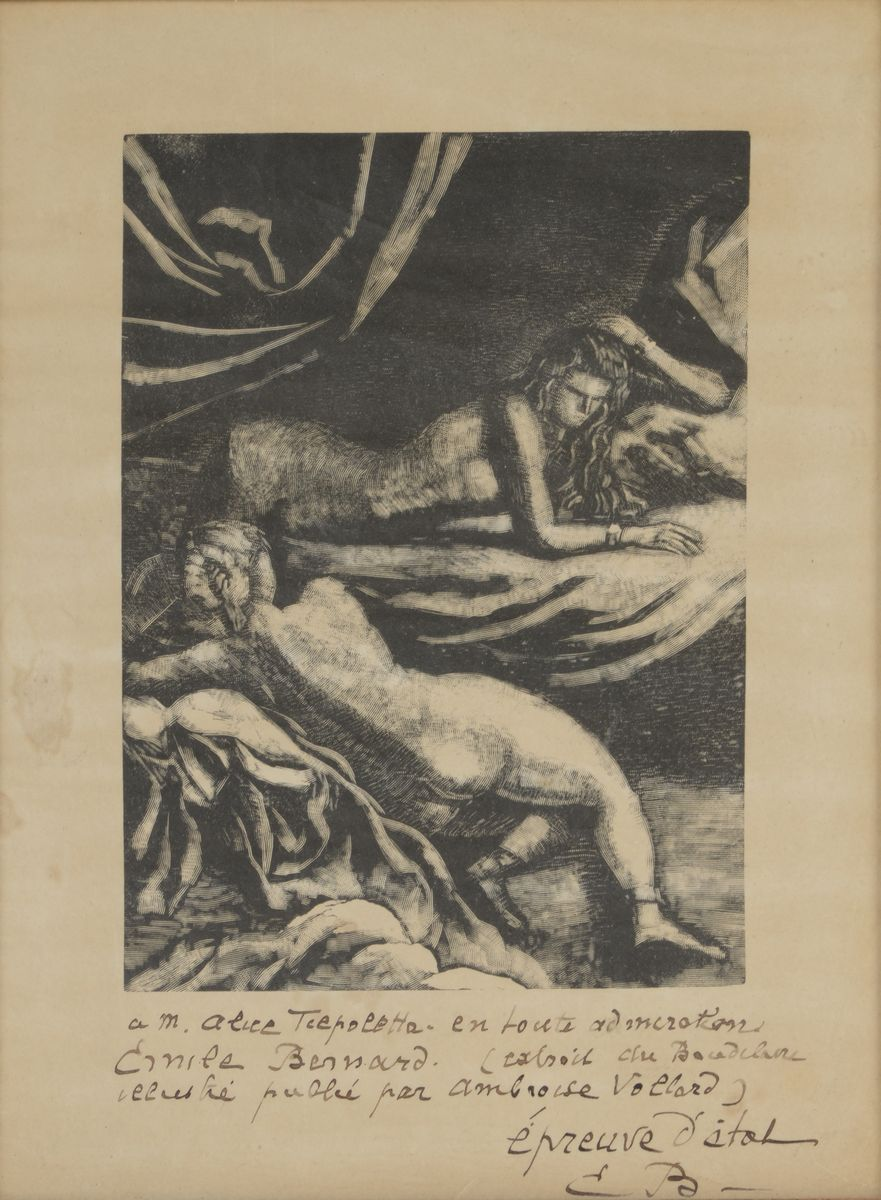
Illustration for Les Fleurs du mal by Charles Baudelaire (1916), by Émile Bernard

During the First World War, due to the difficulty in finding quality materials, he had to resort to photoengraving for some of his editions. Even so, he achieved quality results, especially thanks to the collaboration of Georges Rouault. Vollard's first collaboration with this artist took place in 1912, when Rouault offered him to edit a Miserere on which he was working; Vollard bought it in exchange for illustrating a book written by the dealer himself, Les Réincarnations du Père Ubu, which would not see the light until 1932.

The Miserere (1916-1927) is one of the most original and creative series of prints of the early 20th century, in which the artist combined different techniques: the drawing was transferred to copper plates by means of heliogravure, on which Rouault worked with acid and etching tools, achieving unique tones and values in the history of engraving. The final result did not satisfy Vollard, however, who considered it unsaleable; Rouault had to sue his heirs to get the plates, and the series was finally published in 1948. In the 1920s, Vollard resumed publishing original prints, publishing works by Georges Braque, Marc Chagall, Raoul Dufy, Jules Flandrin, Tsuguharu Foujita, Aristide Maillol and Maurice de Vlaminck. His last two editions, before his death, were of works by Rouault: Cirque de l'étoile filante (1938) and Passioné (1939).

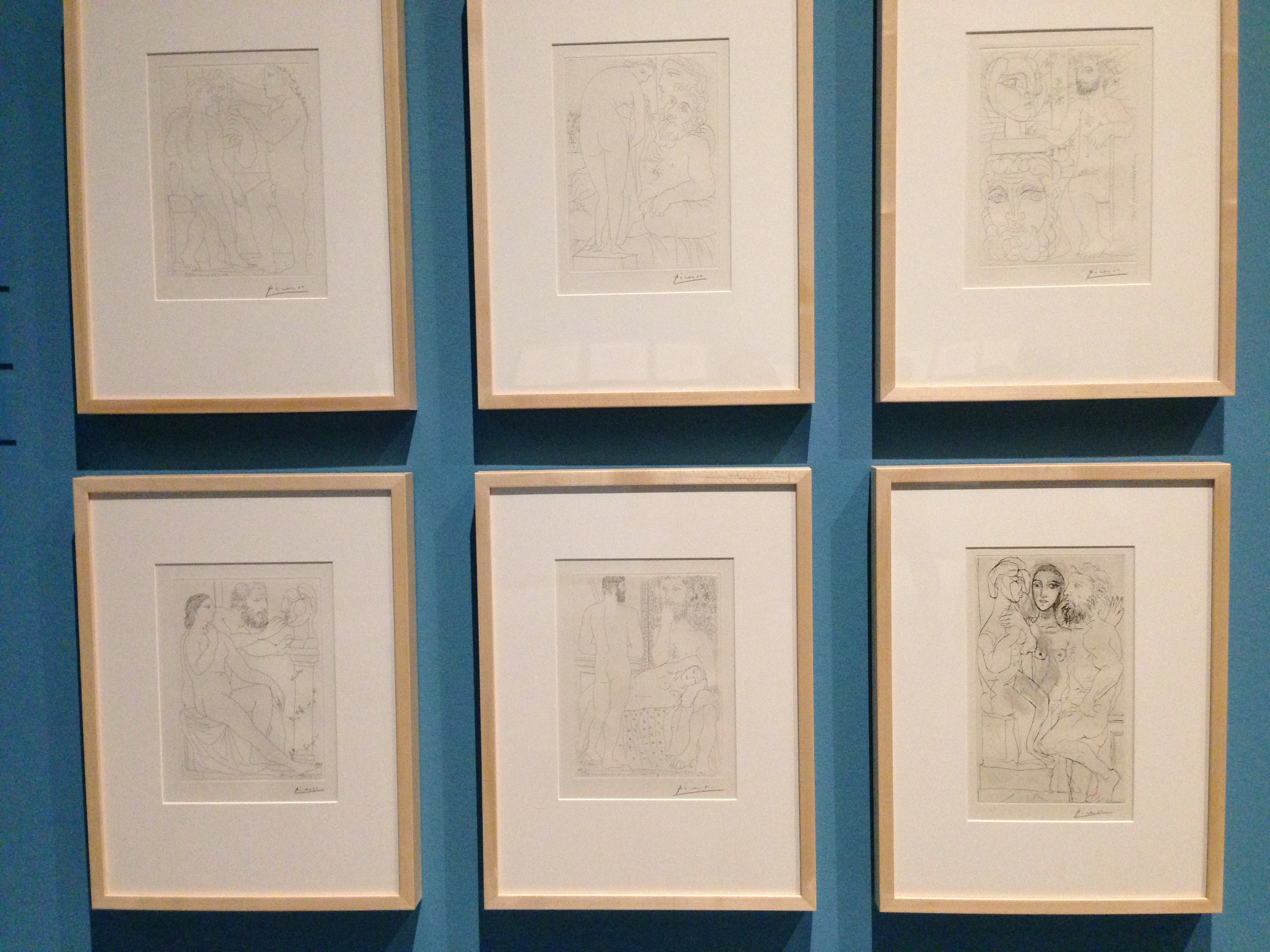
Prints by Pablo Picasso from the Vollard Suite, 1939

Vollard's greatest success was undoubtedly his collaboration with Pablo Picasso, which gave rise to one of the best known series of prints made in the century: the Vollard Suite. In the 1920s, Picasso's relationship with Vollard grew close: a series of etchings made by Picasso in 1927 on the theme of the artist and his model was acquired by the dealer to illustrate The Unknown Masterpiece by Honoré de Balzac, published in 1931. It was then that Vollard commissioned a series of prints that the artist produced between 1930 and 1937, and which was published in 1939: the Vollard Suite. It is a set of one hundred prints—most of them etchings and some drypoint—of diverse subject matter, divided into several sequences; the largest (about forty) revolve around the theme The sculptor's workshop, centered on the relationship between a sculptor, his model and his work, an autobiographical reference in which the model is Marie-Thérèse Walter, his partner at the time; another group revolves around the theme of The Rape, while there are several dedicated to the figure of The Minotaur, among which stands out Blind Minotaur in the Dark, considered one of the best of the series; there are also three portraits of Vollard. At the same time, in 1931 he illustrated for the publisher Albert Skira The Metamorphoses by Ovid.

In 1935 he made Minotauromachy, an etching with engraving, where he takes up again the figure of the Minotaur seen for example in Minotaur Kneeling over Sleeping Girl from the Vollard Suite. It is considered one of the stylistic precedents of Guernica. Between 1936 and 1937 he illustrated Historia natural by Buffon (published in 1942), again commissioned by Vollard, a set of thirty-one sugar-lift etchings in a realistic style. In 1937, he made The Dream and Lie of Franco (Sueño y mentira de Franco), a set of eighteen small vignette-like images etched on two copper plates (with aquatint), as a denunciation against the Spanish Civil War and Francisco Franco; a thousand copies were printed and sold at the Spanish Pavilion of the Exposition Internationale des Arts et Techniques dans la Vie Moderne of that year.

== Portraits ==
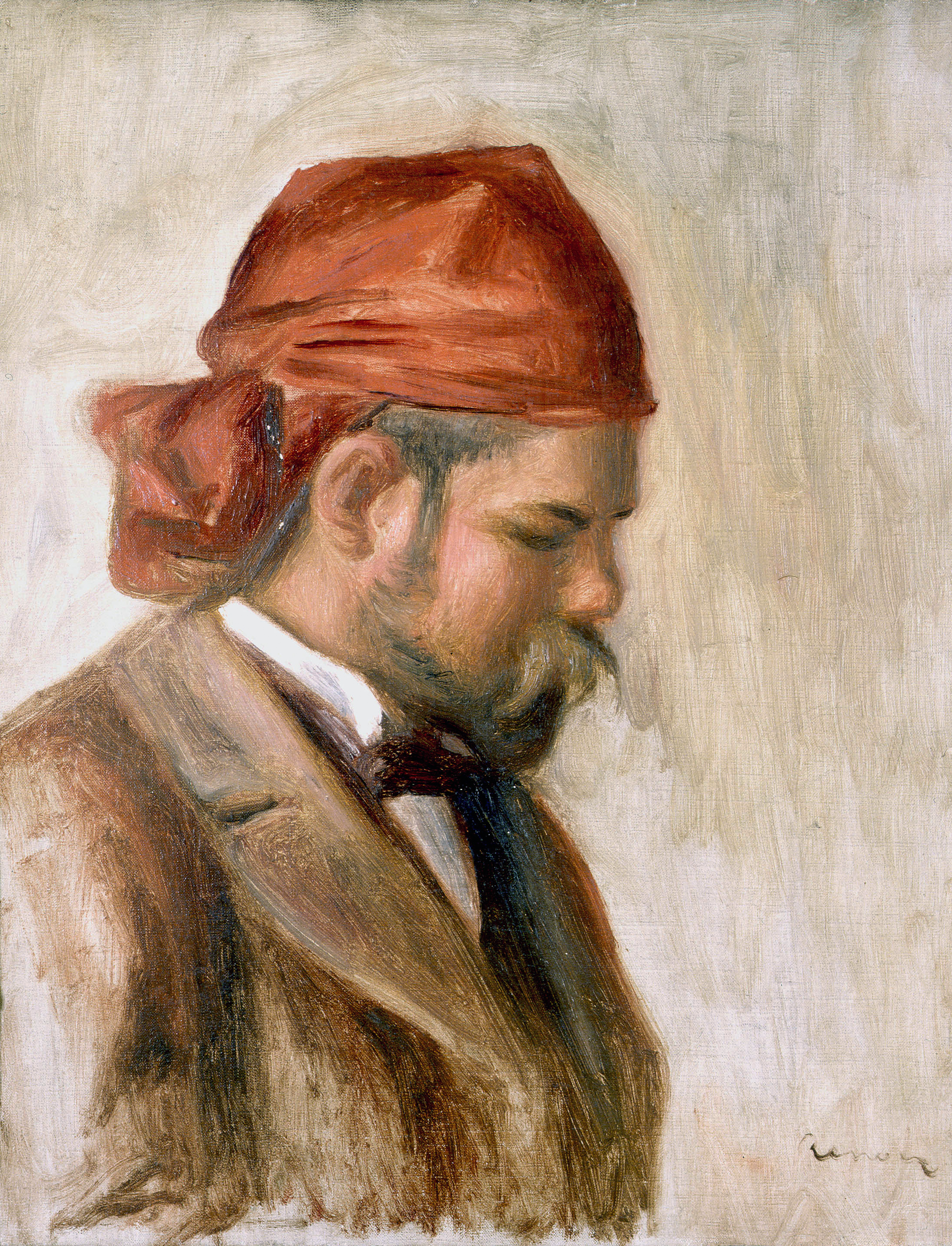
Portrait of Ambroise Vollard in a Red Headscarf, Renoir, 1899

Vollard was depicted in numerous portraits in his lifetime, as a result of his relationships with many artists of the period and his influence on their careers. The first of these was Portrait of Ambroise Vollard painted by Cézanne in 1899. Other notable portraits include, Portrait of Ambroise Vollard in a Red Headscarf by Renoir in 1899, Portrait of Ambroise Vollard with a Cat, painted by Pierre Bonnard c.1924, and Portrait of Ambroise Vollard painted by Pablo Picasso in 1910. Picasso opined that, "they all did him through a sense of competition, each one wanting to do him better than the others".

== Death ==
With war approaching, Vollard set out in July 1939 from his cottage in Le Tremblay-sur-Mauldre to travel to his mansion on the Rue de Martignac, where he had stored 10,000 artworks. Nearing the junction to Pontchartrain, on a very wet road, his chauffeur-driven Talbot skidded and then somersaulted twice. Having fractured his cervical vertebrae, there he lay with his chauffeur until found dead, aged 73, the following morning.

== Art collection ==
After his death, Vollard's executor was fellow dealer Martin Fabiani, who was instructed to divide his collection between his heirs: Madelaine de Galea, an alleged mistress; and his brother Lucien.

Due to the Nazi invasion of France, which started on 10 May 1940, Fabiani hurriedly shipped 560 paintings to Étienne Bignou's art gallery on 57th Street in New York City in the United States, where prices were likely higher. The paintings left on the SS Excalibur from Lisbon, Portugal on 25 September 1940, but the ship was intercepted by the Royal Navy and H. Montgomery Hyde in Bermuda on 3 October. Designated "enemy property", the paintings were stored at the National Gallery of Canada in Ottawa during World War II. Post-war, on 19 April 1949, the London prize court agreed to the release of the pieces to Fabiani, who returned the works to Vollard's sisters. In gratitude, the sisters donated all of the lithographs by Rouault and Chagall, and a single painting by Gauguin to the National Gallery of Canada. The remaining works soon started appearing on the New York City commercial art gallery market, where they were quickly sold.

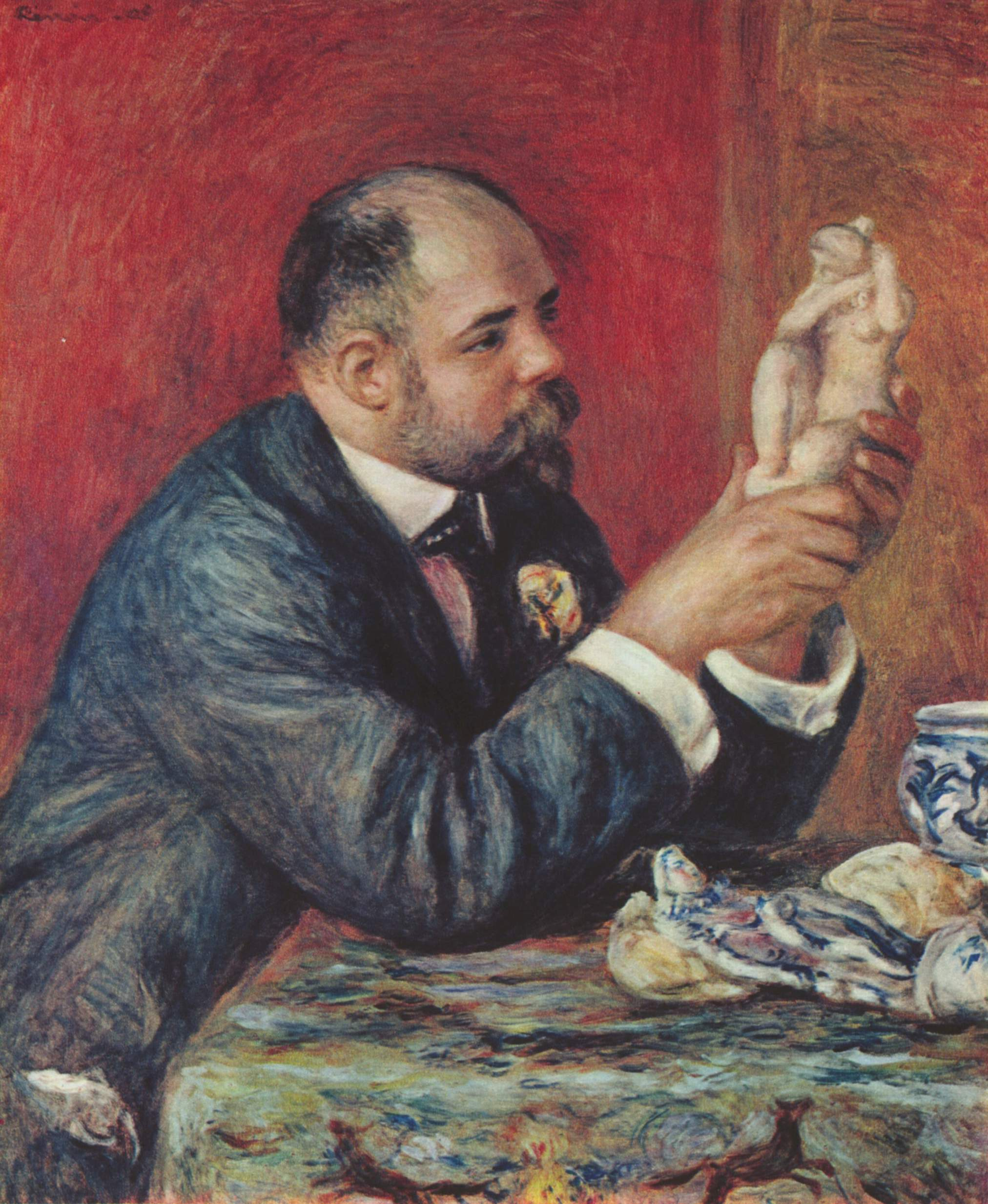
Pierre-Auguste Renoir, Portrait of Ambroise Vollard, 1908, 82 x 65 cm, Courtauld Institute Galleries, London

Vollard's former secretary and protégé, Erich Šlomović, a young Serb with Jewish origins (b. 1915), had connections with Vollard, Fabiani, and Lucien Vollard from about 1938. He had often stated his wish to create a museum of French art collected by him in Yugoslavia. Šlomović had amassed a collection of about 600 works, most of them prints or drawings, with a few important oil paintings, by a combination of exchange, gift, purchase, and donation. Vollard had put him in direct contact with the most prominent artists of the day and often asked him to act as agent for art selling or purchasing purposes.

Beginning in 1940, Šlomović put about 200 works in storage in a bank vault, at a branch of the Société Générale in Paris. Returning home with about 450 works, he exhibited them in Zagreb, Croatia, in 1940. With the advance of German armies in Serbia, he went into hiding, along with his brother Egon, and his father and mother Roza. They placed the paintings in crates behind the wall of a farmhouse in the Southern Serbian village of Bacina. Šlomović, his brother and father were soon arrested, and, like many other Jews in occupied Serbia, killed by the Nazi Germans in 1942 in Belgrade. After the war the paintings were appropriated by the Yugoslav authorities. They have been shown officially only once, in 1989 in Belgrade and Zagreb under the name "Slomovic Collection." A legal battle is currently (2014) underway to determine the ownership of the Belgrade collection, including the Šlomović heirs, the Vollard beneficiaries, and the Serbian government.

The Paris works were discovered in 1979 when the bank was allowed to open its vault to recover unpaid storage fees. An 11-year legal dispute ensued by the heirs of both Vollard and Šlomović, which delayed their resale. A court in Amiens, France, ruled in 1996 that the paintings stored in Paris were to be awarded to the Vollard estate. These were sold off by Sotheby's in Paris and in London in June 2010, totaling 30 million euros in proceeds. These included a 1905 Derain painted at Collioure, as well as works by Mary Cassatt, Cézanne, Chagall, Degas, Picasso and Renoir.

== Honours and awards ==
- Officier of the Ordre des Palmes Académiques (1911)
- Chevalier of the Order of Legion of Honour (1925)
- Commandeur of the Order of Glory (Tunisia)
