= Erich Šlomović =

Yugoslav art collector (1915–1942)

- Born: 1915; Đakovo, Austro-Hungarian Empire, (now Croatia)
- Died: 1942 (aged 27); Around Ćuprija, Kingdom of Yugoslavia (now Serbia)
- Cause of death: Murdered in Holocaust
- Occupation: Art collector
- Employer: Ambroise Vollard
- Parent(s): Bernard and Roza Šlomović
- Relatives: Egon Šlomović (brother)

Erich Šlomović (Serbian: Erih Šlomović, also known as Erich Chlomovitch) (1915–1942) was a Yugoslav art collector. He was an assistant and protégé of Ambroise Vollard.

== Early life ==
Šlomović was born in Đakovo (Austro-Hungarian Empire) in 1915 to a Jewish family of Bernard and Roza Šlomović. He had a brother, Egon.

== Career ==
In the 1930s, Šlomović moved to Paris, where he was befriended by legendary art collector Ambroise Vollard. Through Vollard, Šlomović met the greatest artists of the age, including Picasso, Matisse, Cocteau, Rouault among others, and was able to amass an impressive personal collection of some 600 works. Vollard died in a car accident in July 1939. Shortly after that, with France on the brink of Nazi invasion, Šlomović decided to return to Yugoslavia, where the war had not yet spread. He left about 200 artworks in a vault in the Société Générale in Paris, and the rest he had shipped via diplomatic pouch to Belgrade. These were exhibited at a highly acclaimed exhibition in Zagreb in 1940.

== World War II ==
During World War II, with the Independent State of Croatia establishment in 1941, Šlomović and his family moved to the village of Bačina in Serbia in an attempt to save themselves. While in Bačina, Šlomović hid the paintings he brought with him in a double wall. Slomovic was killed by Nazis at the age of 27.

Bernard, Erich and Egon were taken to detention camp in Ćuprija and were all killed. Erich's mother Roza and distant in-law Mara – who was born Serbian Orthodox but converted to Judaism when she married Roza Šlomović's nephew Fridrih Hercler – were not touched and neither was his collection. Roza died in a train accident, together with Mara's children, while transporting the collection to Belgrade which had been liberated by the Red Army and the Josip Broz's partisan units. The accident happened on 31st Dec 1944 in Velika Plana, Serbia. Mara survived the Holocaust hidden by the local population. Mara then went on to remarry with a person who had also lost his wife and children during WWII and became the mother of David Albahari and his sister.

== Legacy ==
After his death, the collection ended up in the National Museum of Serbia. In 1989 Veljko Bulajić directed Donator, a movie dedicated to Šlomović's tragic life while in 2004 Momo Kapor wrote a book about his life. The paintings in the Société Generale bank were discovered in 1979 when the bank was allowed to open the vault to recover unpaid storage fees. There is a legal dispute over the ownership of those paintings.

== Restitution claims and court decisions ==
Vollard's and Slomovic's heirs had competing claims on several artworks. An agreement was reached, paving the way for a sale at Sothebys. Many uncertainties and competing versions of the history remain.
