= Vollard Suite =

Set of etchings by the artist Pablo Picasso

Prints from the Vollard Suite
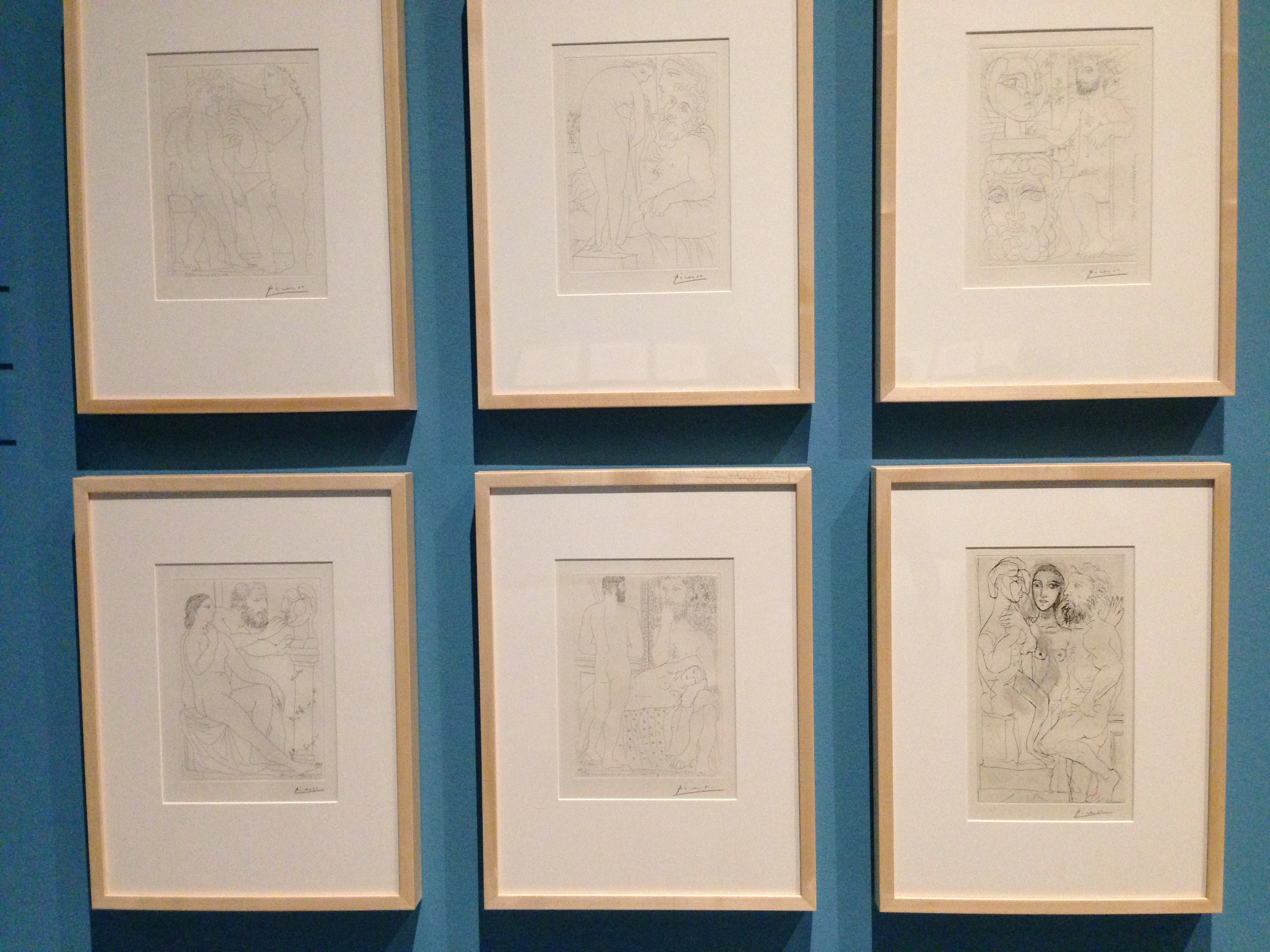
- Artist: Pablo Picasso
- Year: 1930–1937

The Vollard Suite is a set of 100 etchings in the neoclassical style by the Spanish artist Pablo Picasso, produced from 1930 to 1937. Named after the art dealer who commissioned them, Ambroise Vollard (1866–1939), the suite is in a number of museums. More than 300 sets were created.

An earlier Vollard Suite was commissioned from Paul Gauguin in 1898–99, a smaller group in woodcut and monotype, which Vollard did not like.

== History ==
In 1930 Picasso was commissioned to produce the etchings by the art dealer and publisher Ambroise Vollard in exchange for paintings by Pierre-Auguste Renoir and Paul Cézanne.

Picasso worked extensively on the set in the spring of 1933, and completed the suite in 1937. It took a further two years for the printmaker Roger Lacourière to finish printing the first 230 sets of the series, but the death of Vollard in 1939 and the Second World War meant that the sets only started coming onto the art market in the 1950s. The completed edition consisted of 250 copies on Montval paper watermarked "Vollard" or "Picasso", fifty copies on Montval paper watermarked "Papeterie Montgolfier à Montval", and three copies on parchment, hand-signed.

A 1971 exhibition of the suite in Madrid was attacked by a paramilitary group, the Guerrilleros de Cristo Rey (Warriors of Christ the King) who tore the pictures and poured acid over the prints. The group attacked things associated with Spanish exiles like Picasso who aligned themselves with the Republican cause in the Spanish Civil War.

A spinning residential building in Brazil was named Suite Vollard after the suite.

More than 300 sets were created, but many were broken up and the prints sold separately. A complete set is owned by the National Gallery of Australia and a complete set was acquired by the British Museum in 2011 after a donation of £1 million from financier Hamish Parker, a director of Mondrian Investment Partners. The donation was in memory of Parker's father, Major Horace Parker. It had been the British Museum's ambition to own the set and the acquisition was described by the museum's director, Neil MacGregor, as "one of the institution's most important acquisitions of the past 50 years".

== The series ==
The works are not based on a literary source, and are not titled, although according to the Fundación Juan March, "Some of the themes have a remote origin in Honoré de Balzac's short story Le Chef-d'œuvre inconnu (The Unknown Masterpiece, 1831), which greatly impressed Picasso. It tells the story of a painter's efforts to capture life itself on canvas through the means of feminine beauty". The works are inscribed by Picasso with the year month and day that he drew the image. Writing in the Daily Telegraph Richard Dorment claims that as Picasso took such a long time to create the suite, "the imagery and the emotional register of the prints constantly shifts to reflect Picasso's erotic and artistic obsessions, marital vicissitudes, and the darkening political situation in Europe...In the years Picasso worked on the series, fascism spread through Europe, and civil war erupted in Spain. These anxieties also found their way into the Vollard Suite, so that by the time you reach the end of the show and the last images of the blind minotaur, you feel that you are in a different emotional universe from the sunlit arcadia you encountered at the show's beginning".

The suite begins with prints exploring the theme of the sculptor's studio, Picasso's mistress, Marie-Thérèse Walter, is portrayed as a model lying in the arms of a bearded sculptor. Picasso had recently been inspired by Marie-Thérèse to create a series of monumental bronze heads in the neoclassical style. Picasso had also recently been commissioned by the publisher Albert Skira in 1928 to create original intaglio prints for his translation of Ovid's Metamorphoses, which appeared in 1931.

Dorment comments that a minotaur appears, joining in scenes of bacchic excess, but the minotaur is transformed from a gentle lover and bon vivant into a rapist and devourer of women, reflecting Picasso's turbulent relationships with Marie-Thérèse and his wife Olga. In a third transformation, the minotaur becomes pathetic, blind and impotent, he wanders by night, led by a little girl with the features of Marie-Thérèse. The final three prints from the suite are portraits of Vollard.

Picasso learned new techniques of etching during the suite, from relatively simple line etchings, through burin, dry point, aquatinting and sugar aquatinting learnt through Roger Lacourière in his workshop, this enabled him to achieve more painterly effects. Most of the prints were completed to Picasso's satisfaction in a single state, but others, especially the erotic compositions, exist in several states, fourteen in one case.

== Collections with complete sets ==
- Bibliothèque nationale de France, département des Estampes
- British Museum
- Colby College Museum of Art
- Fundación MAPFRE, Madrid
- Harry Ransom Center
- Hood Museum of Art, Hanover, New Hampshire
- Kunstmuseum Pablo Picasso Münster
- Modern Art Museum of Fort Worth
- Museum Ludwig, Cologne
- Museo de Arte Contemporáneo de Caracas (MACC)
- National Gallery of Australia
- National Gallery of Canada
- Philadelphia Museum of Art
