= Dynamic Tower =

Cancelled skyscraper planned for the UAE

General information
- Status: Never built
- Type: Hotel; Residential; Office
- Location: United Arab Emirates
- Construction started: Unknown
- Estimated completion: Unknown
- Cost: AED1.2 billion, $330 million

Height
- Architectural: 420 metres (1,378 ft)

Technical details
- Floor count: 80

Design and construction
- Architect: David Fisher
- Developer: Dynamic Architecture

The Dynamic Tower (also known as the rotating tower or the Da Vinci Tower) is a cancelled 420-metre (1,378 ft), 80-floor moving skyscraper, designed by architect David Fisher.

Similar to the Suite Vollard completed in 2001 in Brazil, each floor is designed to rotate independently, resulting in a changing shape of the tower. Each floor is designed to rotate a maximum of 6 metres (20 ft) per minute, or one full rotation in 180 minutes.

It was proposed as the world's first prefabricated skyscraper with 40 factory-built modules for each floor. Fisher said that 90% of the tower could be built in a factory and shipped to the construction site. This would allow the entire building to be built more quickly. The core of the tower must be built at the construction site. Fisher said that the prefabricated portions would decrease the project's cost and the number of workers, and that construction will take 30% less time than a normal skyscraper of the same size. The majority of the workers would be in factories, working under safer conditions. Kitchen and bathroom fixtures would be pre-installed. The core would serve each floor with a special, patented connection for clean water, based on technology used to refuel airplanes in mid-flight.

The entire tower is proposed to be powered from wind turbines and solar panels. Enough surplus electricity should be produced to power five other similar sized buildings in the vicinity. The turbines would be located between each of the rotating floors. Fisher said that they could generate up to 1,200,000 kilowatt-hours of energy each year. The solar panels are expected to cover the roof and the top of each floor.

In 2008, Fisher said that he expected the skyscraper to be completed in 2010. In 2009, Fisher said construction would be complete in late 2011. Fisher did not "say where the tower would be built, [...] because he wanted to keep it a surprise." Fisher acknowledges that he is not well known, has never built a skyscraper before, and has not practiced architecture regularly in decades. In February 2009, National Geographic reported that the tower would be built in Dubai. At the time, apartments in the Dynamic Tower were expected to range in price from USD 3 million to 30 million, with more than 1,100 prospective buyers already on a waiting list. By 2019, construction had not started, and there has been no official announcement of the building site.

== See also ==
- List of twisted buildings
- List of tallest buildings in the United Arab Emirates
- List of tallest buildings in Dubai
- Nakheel Tower
- Dubai Creek Tower
- Jeddah Tower
- Burj Khalifa
- Ocean Heights
- Cayan Tower
