= La Belle Noiseuse =

1991 French epic arthouse drama film by Jacques Rivette

- French theatrical release poster
- Directed by: Jacques Rivette
- Screenplay by: Pascal Bonitzer; Christine Laurent; Jacques Rivette
- Based on: "Le Chef-d'œuvre inconnu" by Honoré de Balzac
- Produced by: Martine Marignac
- Starring: Michel Piccoli; Jane Birkin; Emmanuelle Béart; Marianne Denicourt; David Bursztein; Gilles Arbona; Bernard Dufour
- Cinematography: William Lubtchansky
- Edited by: Nicole Lubtchansky
- Music by: Igor Stravinsky
- Production companies: Pierre Grise Productions; FR3 Films Production; George Reinhart Productions
- Distributed by: Pierre Grise Distribution
- Release dates: 14 May 1991 (Cannes); 4 September 1991 (France)
- Running time: 237 minutes
- Countries: France; Switzerland
- Languages: French; English

La Belle Noiseuse (French: [la bɛl nwazøz], lit. 'The Beautiful Troublemaker') is a 1991 French epic art drama film directed by Jacques Rivette and starring Michel Piccoli, Jane Birkin and Emmanuelle Béart. Loosely adapted from the 1831 short story "Le Chef-d'œuvre inconnu" ("The Unknown Masterpiece") by Honoré de Balzac, and set in present-day France, it tells how a famous old artist is stimulated to come out of retirement and do one last painting of a beautiful young woman. The film won the Grand Prix at the 1991 Cannes Film Festival. It received widespread critical acclaim and it is widely considered to be the best movie about an artist's creative process and work, an artist and his muse's relationship and the impact of art in life.

== Plot ==
A young aspiring artist, Nicolas, and his partner Marianne are introduced by the art dealer Porbus to the aged painter Frenhofer, who has been inactive for many years. Frenhofer lives in a grand château in the south of France with his young wife, Liz. The conversations are initially desultory until Porbus suggests that Frenhofer might want to paint the attractive Marianne. Porbus believes she could be what Frenhofer needs to complete his last piece, which was abandoned ten years ago when Liz was his model. Nicolas agrees to the idea, but Marianne becomes angry with him for not asking her first before promising the master that she would model. Nonetheless, she goes to the château the next day.

Work starts early the next morning in Frenhofer's isolated studio, consisting of continual pen and wash studies on paper of Marianne in different positions as he tries to capture the uniqueness of her body and the character of the woman within it. Over long days together, their relationship fluctuates, sometimes staying distant and sometimes becoming more relaxed. Frenhofer progresses to working in oils on canvas, and one day, he overpaints an unfinished study of Liz. When Liz sneaks into the studio one night and sees it, she is furious and hurt by the symbolism. As the object of Frenhofer's concentrated attention all day, mostly in silence, Marianne has time to rethink her relationship with Nicolas and decides she no longer needs him.

Eventually, Frenhofer finishes his picture, which the film audience never sees. Once complete, the image is too powerful for both Liz and Marianne. Frenhofer hides it in a recess, which he seals with bricks and mortar, and quickly paints an innocuous version in which the face of the model is unseen. Porbus is invited to a celebratory party, after which the changed Marianne breaks up with Nicolas.

== Cast ==
- Michel Piccoli as Édouard Frenhofer
- Jane Birkin as Liz Frenhofer
- Emmanuelle Béart as Marianne
- David Bursztein as Nicolas Wartel
- Marianne Denicourt as Julienne Wartel, Nicolas' sister
- Gilles Arbona as Porbus
- Bernard Dufour as the painter's hand

== Production ==
Principal photography began from 7 July 1990 to 30 August 1990.

== Reception ==
The film won the Grand Prix at the 1991 Cannes Film Festival.

The film received critical acclaim, and occasioned much comment on Béart's extensive onscreen nudity and director Rivette's characteristic use of a long running time (almost four hours).

Chicago Sun-Times film critic Roger Ebert added the film to his Great Movies collection in April 2009.

The film holds an approval rating of 100% on review aggregator site Rotten Tomatoes based on 24 reviews, with a weighted average of 8.5/10. The website's critics consensus reads: "A sensual and hypnotic masterpiece, La Belle Noiseuse luxuriates in its four-hour run time while holding audience attention."

== Alternative version ==
Rivette used alternative takes from the film and made changes in the scene order to produce a shorter, 125-minute version, La Belle Noiseuse: Divertimento, for television. This version was also released theatrically in some countries.
