= Auguste Clot =

French lithographer and printer

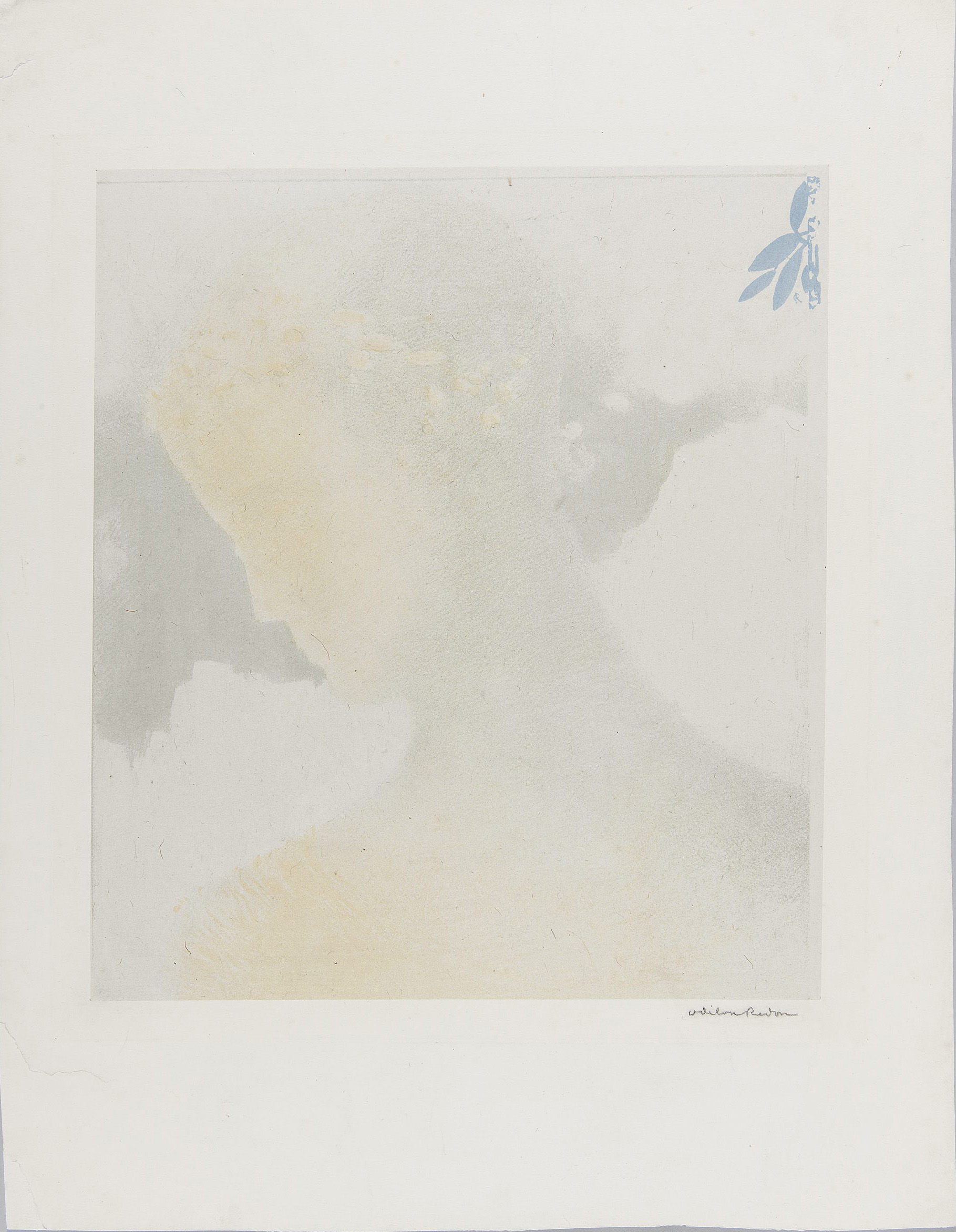
Beatrice, after Odilon Redon, lithography (1897)

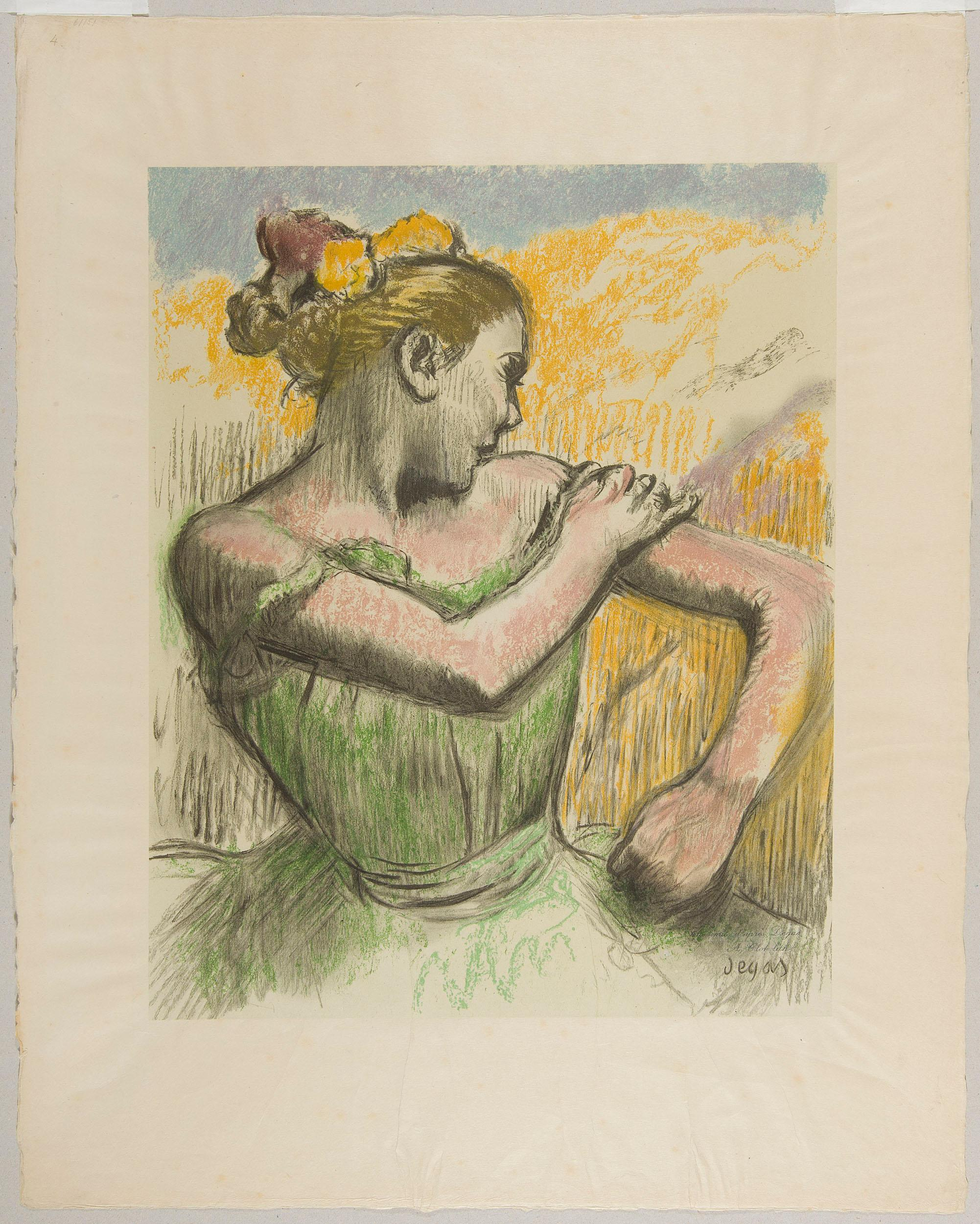
Danseuse, after Edgar Degas, lithography (1899)

Auguste Clot (1858–1936) was a French printer based in Paris and known for his lithographic work with artists including Pierre Bonnard, Maurice Denis, Paul Cézanne, Auguste Rodin, Marie Duhem and Edvard Munch.

Clot was born in Paris in 1858. He began his career working for Lemercier, and founded his own atelier in 1895 or 1896. He often worked with the art dealer and publisher Ambroise Vollard.

Clot died in Villeneuve-Saint-Georges, Val de Marne in 1936.
