= Portrait of Ambroise Vollard (Picasso) =

1910 painting by Pablo Picasso

- Artist: Pablo Picasso
- Year: 1910
- Medium: Oil on canvas
- Movement: Cubism
- Dimensions: 92 cm × 65 cm (36 in × 26 in)
- Location: Pushkin Museum; Moscow

Portrait of Ambroise Vollard (French: Portrait de Ambroise Vollard) is an oil-on-canvas painting by Pablo Picasso, which he painted in 1910. It is now housed in the Pushkin Museum in Moscow. The painting is a representation of the influential art dealer Ambroise Vollard, who played an important role in Picasso's early career as an artist. It is painted in the style of Analytical Cubism, which Picasso pioneered.

== Background ==
The prominent art dealer Ambroise Vollard played an influential role in launching and establishing Picasso's career as an artist. In 1901, when Picasso was aged just 19 years, Vollard presented his first exhibition, which resulted in the sale of many of Picasso's works. Despite this, Vollard did not consider the exhibition to be a success and he did not buy the remaining artwork. He did, however, buy several works from Picasso's Blue and Rose periods after Leo and Gertrude Stein started to collect Picasso's work. The professional relationship between Picasso and Vollard would last for many years, although it was not always harmonious, with Picasso complaining that Vollard had paid a low price for his work at the start of his career.

By 1910, Picasso's technique was becoming more abstract and his reputation grew as a Cubist painter. While searching for an art dealer, Picasso painted several portraits of art dealers, including Portrait of Ambroise Vollard. Vollard was also depicted by many other artists that he dealt with, including Pierre-Auguste Renoir and Paul Cézanne. Vollard published a print series of engravings and illustrated books in the 1920s and 1930s, which included works by Picasso, most notably the Vollard Suite. This significantly raised Picasso's profile as an artist in Europe and America. Although Picasso's reputation continued to grow, Vollard never offered him a contract.

Vollard appreciated the significance of this painting, calling it "notable", but he was not taken by it and sold it to a Russian collector in 1913.

== Description ==
The painting is a portrait of Ambroise Vollard and displays Picasso's analytical approach to Cubism. In contrast to earlier, more traditional portraits of Vollard, created by Cézanne and Renoir, Picasso's painting uses sharp, geometric shapes and planes to convey the form of the subject. The facial features, such as the eyebrows, nose, mouth and beard, are conveyed using short, broken lines. The focal point of the painting is Vollard's large, bald head, which has been highlighted by the use of gold in an otherwise mainly brown surround. In this portrait, Vollard is depicted wearing a brown suit. In contrast to his face, the surroundings have disintegrated into indistinguishable shapes. Vollard was notorious for falling to sleep in company, and this painting accurately represents this habit by depicting the head drooped and the eyes closed.

Picasso's portrait offers a realistic resemblance of Vollard's appearance, in particular, his heavy eyelids, wide nose and compressed mouth. However, the face has been deconstructed, allowing the viewer to put together the image and view the varying planes simultaneously. Each plane flows freely with movement and layers with the next. It is Vollard's face that acts as a magnet and draws these planes together.

The Pushkin Museum says of the portrait, "There is no single source of light in the picture: each of the elements has a special, "internal" light, the vibration of which makes you perceive the work as the pictorial equivalent of the world in continuous motion and creating from colourful matter, as if from the fragments of a cracked mirror, the unique titanic image of Vollard."

Jonathan Jones for The Guardian described the portrait as a "kind of caricature" and opined that, "The more you look for a picture, the more insidiously Picasso demonstrates that life is not made of pictures but of unstable relationships between artist and model, viewer and painting, self and world."

Picasso said of the painting, "The most beautiful woman who ever lived never had her portrait painted, drawn or engraved any oftener than Vollard - by Cézanne, Renoir, Rouault, Bonnard... But my cubist portrait of him is the best one of all."

== Significance and legacy ==
Picasso's artwork continuously changed in style over the course of his lifetime, inspired by personal relationships and the work of other artists. Portrait of Ambroise Vollard displays an important period in the evolution of Picasso's artwork, known as Analytic Cubism. Picasso said of this phase, "A picture used to be a sum of additions. With me, a picture is a sum of destructions."

== Other portraits of Vollard ==
A year after the outbreak of World War I, when the art market had ground to a halt in 1915, Picasso made a pencil portrait of Vollard in August of the same year, this time in the style of Ingres. Vollard kept the portrait until his death.

== See also ==
- Portrait of Ambroise Vollard (Cézanne)
- Portrait of Gertrude Stein
- Ambroise Vollard
- Cubism
- List of Picasso artworks 1901–1910
