= Suite Vollard =

- Interactive map of the Suite Vollard area

General information
- Architectural style: Futurism
- Location: Mossunguê, Curitiba - PR Brazil
- Coordinates: 25.4372°S 49.3208°W
- Completed: 2001

Height
- Height: 50 metres (160 ft)

Technical details
- Structural system: Concrete
- Floor count: 15

Design and construction
- Architect: (Bruno de Franco)

The Suite Vollard is a futuristic residential building in Curitiba, Paraná, Brazil. It is the world's first spinning building.

Opened in 2001, the Suite Vollard was constructed by Moro Construções Civis LTDA, and Fritz Georg Gehbauer. The architect was Bruno de Franco. It was built in the Ecoville District in Curitiba, and has since become a famous, well-known building in the city.

The floors each have double sheets of glass on the façade, tinted silver, gold, or blue, depending on the floor. This provides "a spectacular effect" as the floors rotate in opposite directions. The bottom floors of the building are mostly an executive center.

Each of the 11 floors, comprising the majority of the building, can rotate clockwise or counter-clockwise, with a full revolution of 360 degrees taking an hour. The building was a case study that was used to gather data for more than thirty companies in Brazil, as well as one in Germany. Apartments sell for $400,000 each.

The Suite Vollard apartment complex is named after Pablo Picasso's collection of etchings, the Vollard Suite, which was held on display when the building was inaugurated.

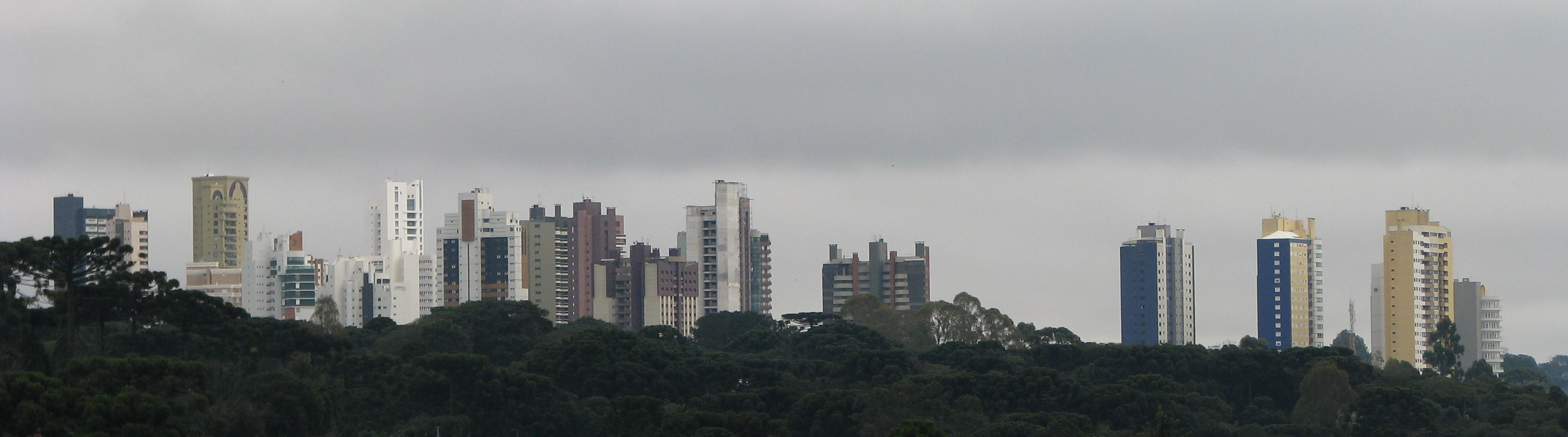
Buildings in Ecoville, Curitiba. Suite Vollard is the second from right to left.
