= Gu Gan =

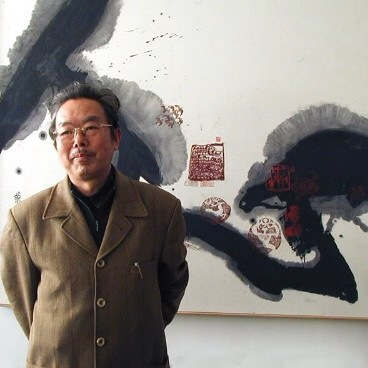
- Gu Gan in 2009
- Born: July 28, 1942; Changsha, Hunan Province, China
- Died: 30 May 2020 (aged 77)
- Notable work: Heart to Heart, Label for Wine by Château Mouton Rothschild; The Red Golden Age, Collected by British Museum

Gu Gan (Chinese: 古干 b.1942), the family name is Gu, also whose original name is Zhang Shiqiang, is a calligraphist from Changsha, Hunan Province, China. He graduated from the middle school attached to the Central Art Academy in 1962. In 1975, he was assigned to work in the People's Literature Publishing House.

In 1998 he was invited by Baroness Philippine de Rothschild to design the wine label for the Mouton Rothschild 1996 vintage. Gu Gan is the first Chinese artist to ever have been thus honored.

== Positions ==
- Member of the Chinese Artists Association
- First president of the China Society of modern Calligraphy and painting
