= Le Chef-d'œuvre inconnu =

1831 short story by Honoré de Balzac

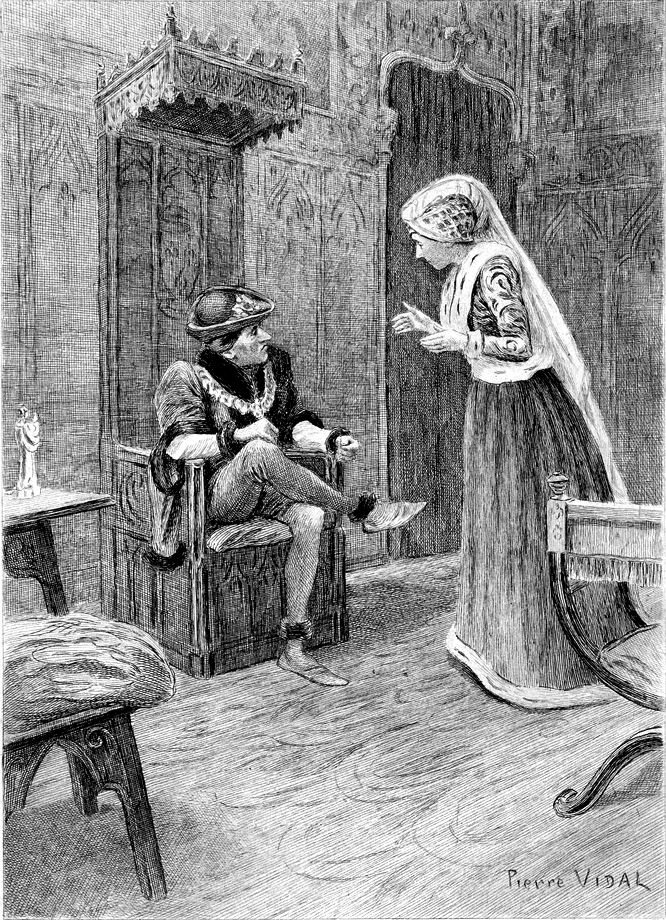
- Illustration by Pierre Vidal of a scene from "Le Chef-d'œuvre inconnu"
- Author: Honoré de Balzac
- Illustrator: Pierre Vidal
- Language: French
- Series: La Comédie humaine
- Publisher: Charles-Béchet
- Publication date: 1831
- Publication place: France

"Le Chef-d'œuvre inconnu" (English: "The Unknown Masterpiece") is a short story by Honoré de Balzac. It was first published in the newspaper L'Artiste with the title "Maître Frenhofer" (English: "Master Frenhofer") in August 1831. It appeared again later in the same year under the title "Catherine Lescault, conte fantastique". It was published in Balzac's Études philosophiques in 1837 and was integrated into La Comédie humaine in 1846. The work is separated into two chapters: "Gillette" and "Catherine Lescault".

"Le Chef-d'œuvre inconnu" is a reflection on art, and has had an important influence on modernist artists.

== Plot summary ==
Young Nicolas Poussin, as yet unknown, visits the painter Porbus in his workshop. He is accompanied by the old master Frenhofer, who comments expertly on the large tableau that Porbus has just finished. The painting is of Mary of Egypt, and while Frenhofer sings her praises, he hints that the work seems unfinished. With some slight touches of the paintbrush, Frenhofer transforms Porbus' painting such that Mary the Egyptian appears to come alive before their very eyes. Although Frenhofer has mastered his technique, he admits that he has been unable to find a suitable model for his own masterpiece, which depicts a beautiful courtesan called Catherine Lescault, known as La Belle noiseuse. He has been working on this future masterpiece that no one has yet seen for ten years. Poussin offers his own lover, Gillette, as a model. Gillette is so beautiful that Frenhofer is inspired to finish his project quickly. Poussin and Porbus come to admire the painting, but all they can see is part of a foot that has been lost in a swirl of colors. Their disappointment drives Frenhofer to madness, and he burns his paintings and dies that night.

== Historical background ==
Unlike most other stories in La Comédie humaine, this is set in the 17th century, in the year 1612. Of the three artists depicted in this story, Poussin and Porbus were real artists of the 17th century. Frenhofer is a purely fictional character, allegedly the only pupil of Mabuse. In the case of Porbus, Balzac used the gallicized version of the surname of Frans Pourbus.

== Influence on artists ==
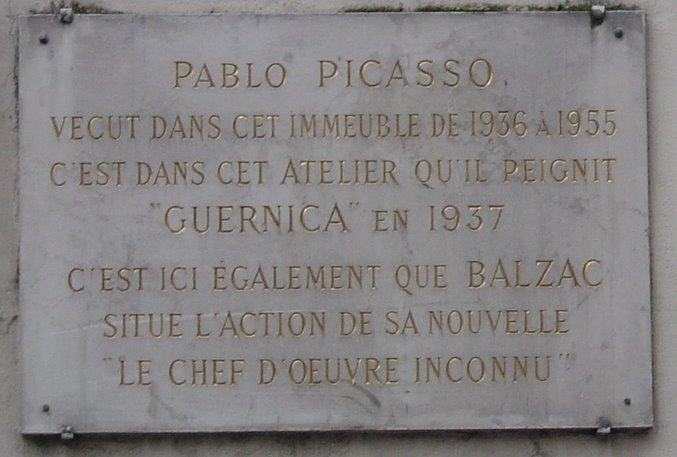
Commemorative plaque at 7 rue des Grands-Augustins.

Paul Cézanne strongly identified with Frenhofer, once saying "Frenhofer, c'est moi" (I am Frenhofer). Critic Jon Kear argues that Cézanne's own attempts to paint the nude were heavily influenced by Balzac's portrayal of Frenhofer's work.

In 1927, Ambroise Vollard asked Picasso to illustrate "Le Chef-d'œuvre inconnu". Picasso was fascinated by the text and identified with Frenhofer so much that he moved to the rue des Grands-Augustins in Paris where Balzac located Porbus' studio. There he painted his own masterpiece Guernica. Picasso lived here during World War II.

== Adaptations ==
Sidney Peterson's 1949 avant-garde film Mr Frenhofer and the Minotaur was based on the link between the short story and the work of Picasso. It draws on Picasso's Minotauromachy, bringing Picasso's work to life with the characters of Gillette, Poussin and Porbus participating.

"Le Chef-d'œuvre inconnu" inspired the film La Belle Noiseuse by Jacques Rivette (1991), and is mentioned in a scene of Rivette's Gang of Four.
