= Bernard Dufour =

French painter (1922–2016)

- Born: 21 November 1922; Paris, France
- Died: 21 July 2016 (aged 93)
- Education: University of Heidelberg
- Occupation: Painter

Bernard Dufour (21 November 1922 – 21 July 2016) was a French painter. He was notable for abstract painting after the Second World War, and later for portraits and human figures.

== Life ==
Born in Paris, France, on 21 November 1922, Dufour originally studied agricultural engineering. During the German Occupation, he was pressed into war labour. He was sent to Germany with Alain Robbe-Grillet and there they met Claude Ollier. In the winter of 1944–45, Dufour went to the University of Heidelberg and studied Eugène Delacroix and Stéphane Mallarmé. After the war, he copied the works of Michelangelo and Tintoretto in the Louvre.

Dufour's first solo exhibition was at the Galerie Maeght in 1948, followed by exhibitions in the Jeanne Bucher Gallery between 1951 and 1953. Motivated by these successes, he soon signed an exclusive contract with art dealer Pierre Loeb. He collaborated with many writers, including René de Solier, André Pieyre de Mandiargues, Georges Lambrichs, Paule Thévenin and Alain Jouffroy. In the later 1950s, Dufour began to attract attention outside France; in 1959, he participated in the second documenta exhibition in Kassel.

From 1960, he turned from abstract to figurative painting, initially self-portraits and mournful figures, later scandalous nudes. In 1961 he opened a studio in an old mill on the river Aveyron in Foissac, where he also lived. He took part in the Venice Biennale in 1964. From this time, he formed enduring friendships with other writers of the literary avant-garde, such as Pierre Guyotat, Denis Roche, Catherine Millet and Jacques Henric. From the 1970s, Dufour worked in photography as well as painting and wrote several volumes of artistic notes and memoirs.

La Belle Noiseuse, Jacques Rivette's 1991 film about an elderly artist, was partly inspired by Dufour, who was credited as "the hand of the artist" painting the picture at the heart of the film. In 1995, Dufour's wife Martine died of cancer. Dufour lived his last years in Villeneuve.

== Work ==
Dufour's representational art has often erotic components. The models in his paintings are often in the company of the painter. This visible relationship with the model brings the viewer of his pictures into a voyeur position. The blending of love and death has been a theme, as in a large (2.76 × 5.05 m) 1975 canvas depicting the autopsied body of Red Army Faction militant Holger Meins juxtaposed with Dufour's nude wife Martine defecating.

== Exhibitions ==
- 2001: Exhibition of glass plates at the European House of Photography
- 2006: Retrospective in 40 paintings at the Strasbourg Museum of Modern Art, organized by Fabrice Hergott
- 2012: "Manipulation"
- 2015: Trigano Gallery, Paris; Portrait of Pierre Guyotat naked, at the Azzedine Alaia gallery, during an exhibition dedicated to the writer and his artist friends.
- 2017: Zürcher Gallery, Paris.
- 2019: Museum of Modern Art in Paris, with a conference at the Beaux-Arts in Paris on Bernard Dufour by Marc Desgrandchamps.

== Bibliography ==
- Catalogue for the exhibition Documenta II (1959) in Kassel: II.documenta'59. Art after 1945; catalogue: Volume 1: Painting, Volume 2: Sculpture; Volume 3: printmaking; Text; Kassel / Cologne 1959
- Henric, Jacques (1986). Bernard Dufour: en plein dans tout (in French). Paris: Marval. ISBN 2-86234-008-1.
- Dufour, Bernard (1990). L'oranger des Osages (Carnets) (in French). Plob. ISBN 2-259-02313-4.
- Dufour, Bernard (1997). Le temps passe quand même (in French). Christian Bourgois. ISBN 2-267-01387-8.
- Dufour, Bernard (2001-04-23). Les clichés-verre (in French). Léo Scheer. ISBN 2-914172-20-6.
- Dufour, Bernard (2004). Mes laissées (in French). Les presses du réel. ISBN 2-902462-99-9.
- Guigon, Emmanuel; Benoît Decron; Marc Desgrandchamps (2006). Bernard Dufour (in French). Strasbourg: Musées de Strasbourg. ISBN 2-35125-031-1.
