= Portrait of Ambroise Vollard in a Red Headscarf =

Painting by Pierre-Auguste Renoir

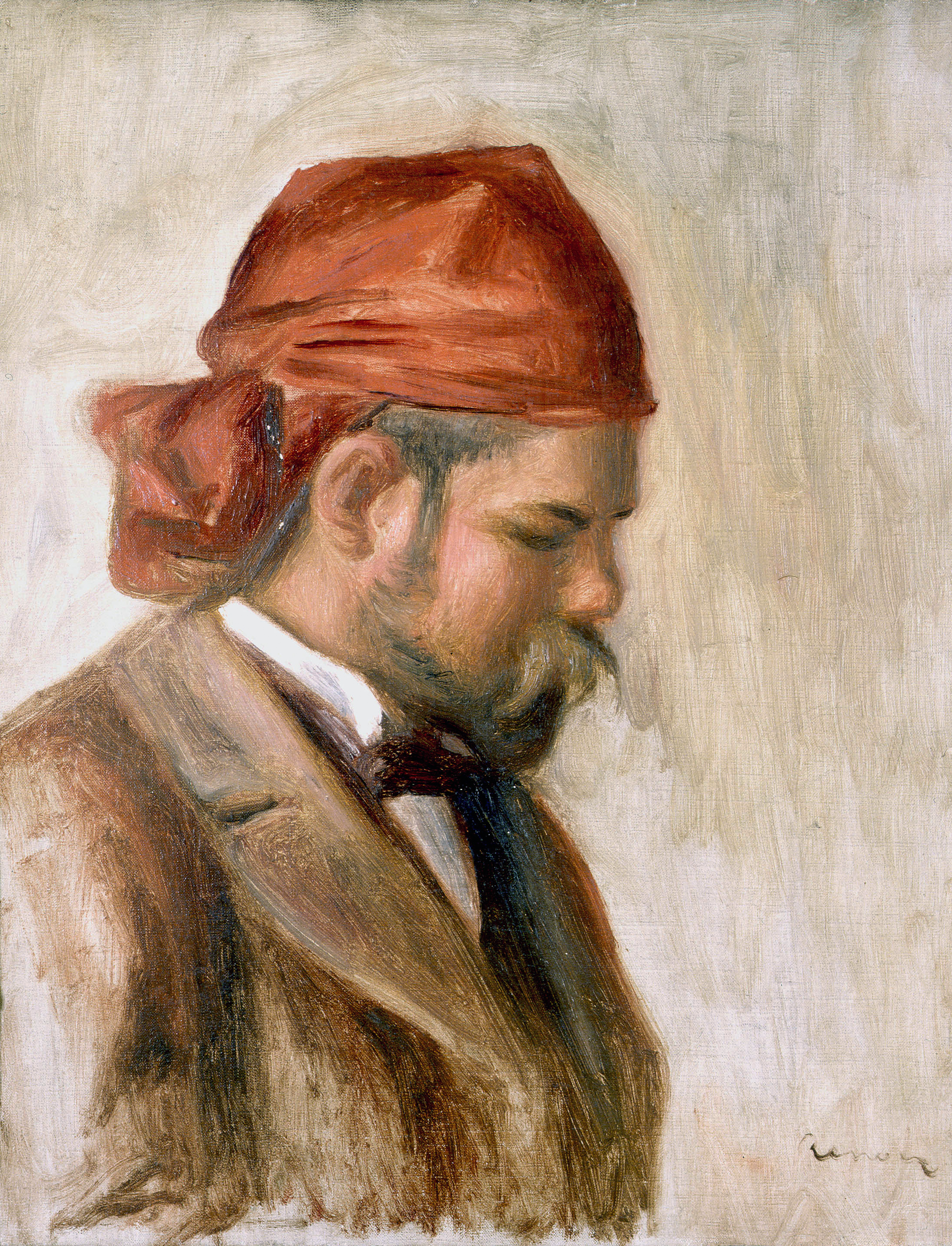
- Artist: Pierre-Auguste Renoir
- Year: c.1899
- Medium: Oil on canvas
- Dimensions: 30 cm × 25 cm (12 in × 9.8 in)
- Location: Petit Palais; Paris

Portrait of Ambroise Vollard in a Red Headscarf (French:Ambroise Vollard au foulard rouge) is an 1899 oil on canvas portrait by Pierre-Auguste Renoir of his art dealer Ambroise Vollard. The painting represents Renoir's late work period (1892–1919). It is housed in the Petit Palais in Paris.

== Description ==
A large bald man, Vollard is pictured in this portrait in profile dressed in a brown wool cloth suit, with characteristically downcast eyes. He wears a red headscarf that has been tied behind his neck, which serves as a reminder of his origins and upbringing on the Indian Ocean island of Réunion.

== Other portraits ==
Vollard was not averse to posing for a portrait and was painted by Renoir on at least two other occasions (conventionally suited in 1908 and dressed as a matador in 1917), as well as by some of Renoir's contemporaries.

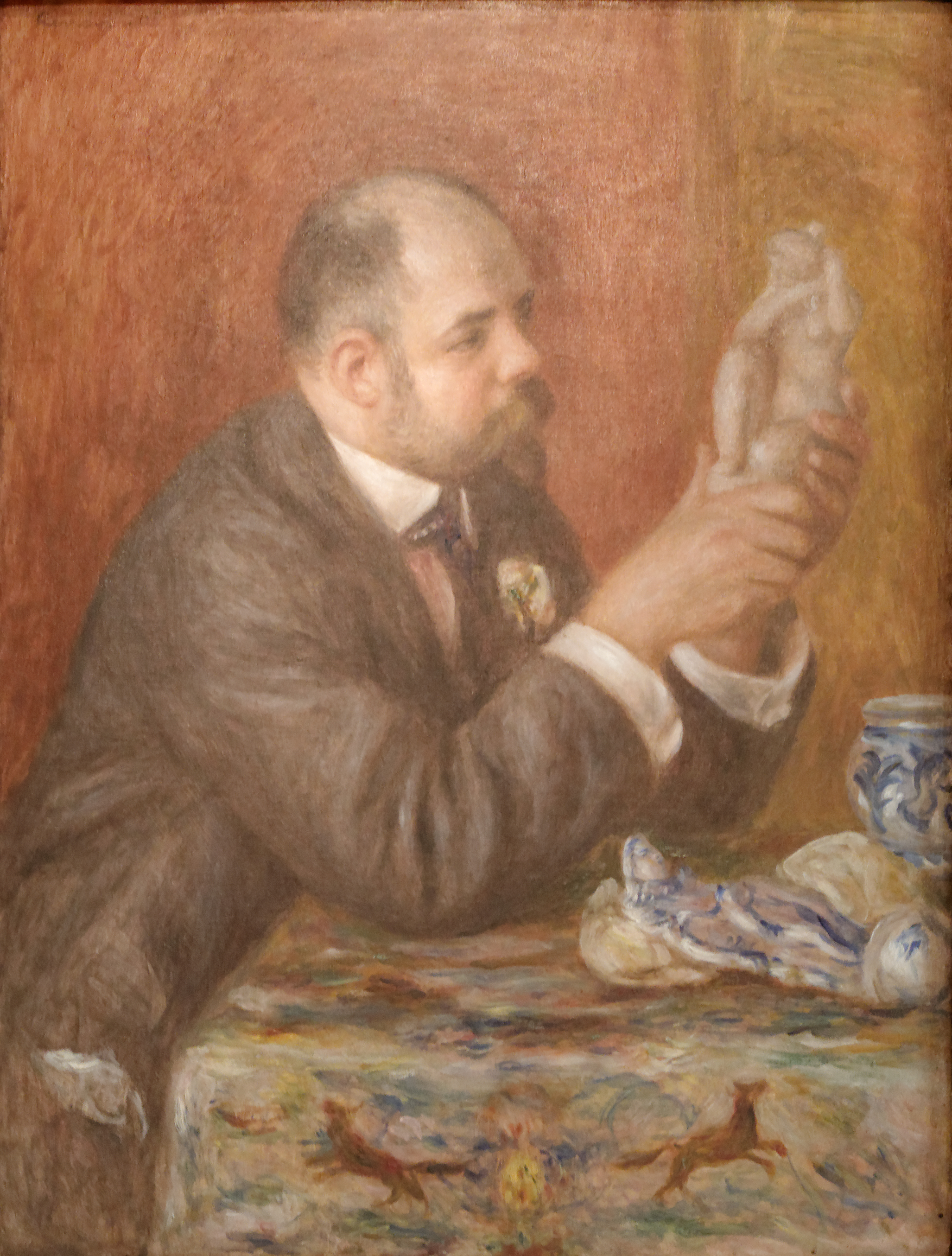
Renoir, 1908

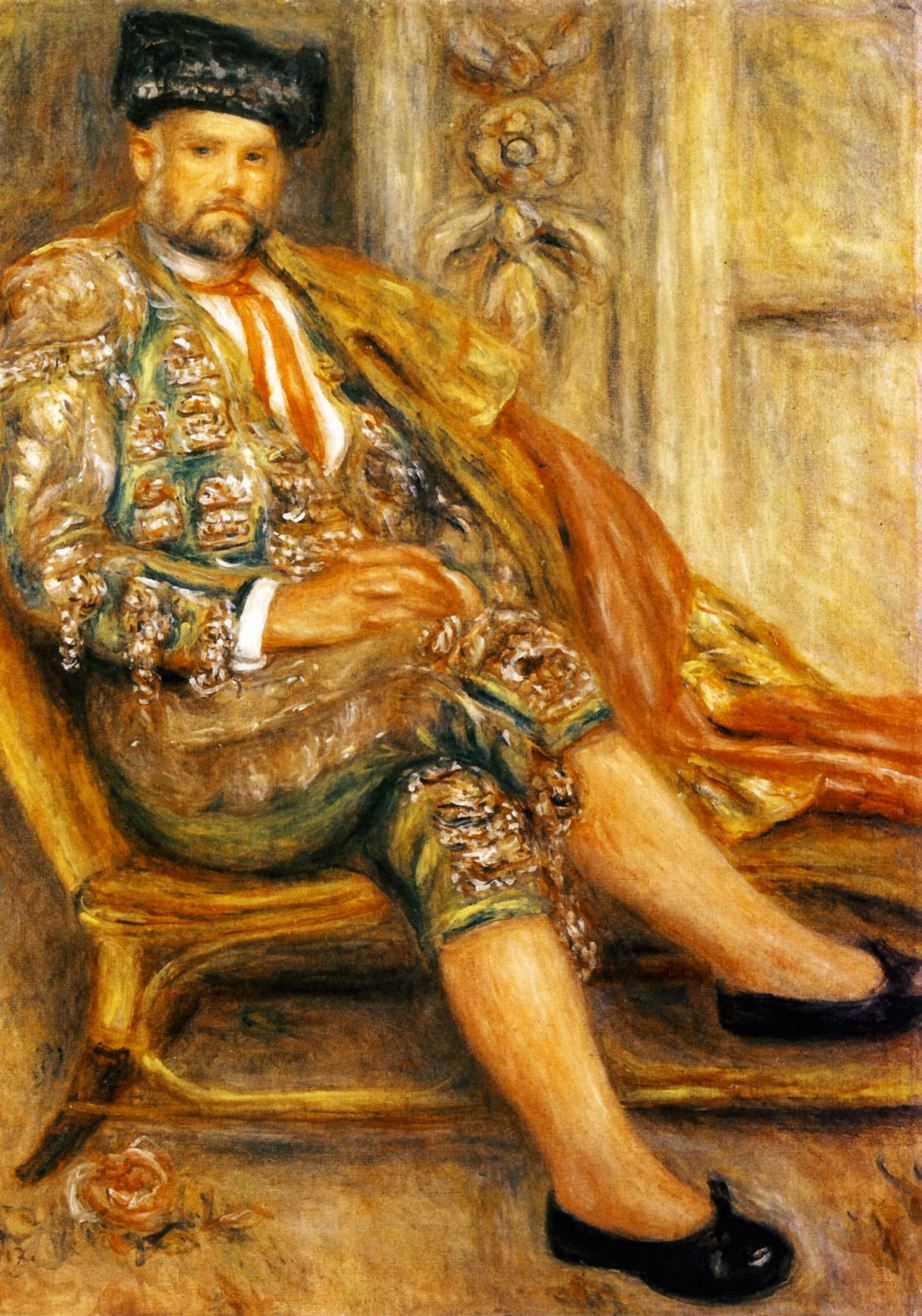
Renoir, 1917

== See also ==
- List of paintings by Pierre-Auguste Renoir
