= Moving skyscraper =

Dubai's dynamic tower

A moving skyscraper is a tall building in which individual floors can rotate on its axis. The world's first such building, the Suite Vollard, is located in Curitiba, Brazil. Another similar project is the canceled Dynamic Tower in Dubai.

== The Dynamic Tower ==
The Dynamic Tower was designed by Italian architect David Fisher, to be built in Dubai. It was proposed to have a total number of 80 floors. All the floors would be prefabricated and would spin 360 degrees around a central column by means of power generated by the wind turbine located between each floor. The apartments were expected to cost about $3.7 million to $36 million. The construction was expected to be completed by 2014, but it was ultimately canceled. The projected cost of the project was 700 million dollars.

== Moscow ==
There are plans to build a 70-story skyscraper in Moscow as well.
