= Portrait of Ambroise Vollard with a Cat =

c. 1924 painting by Pierre Bonnard

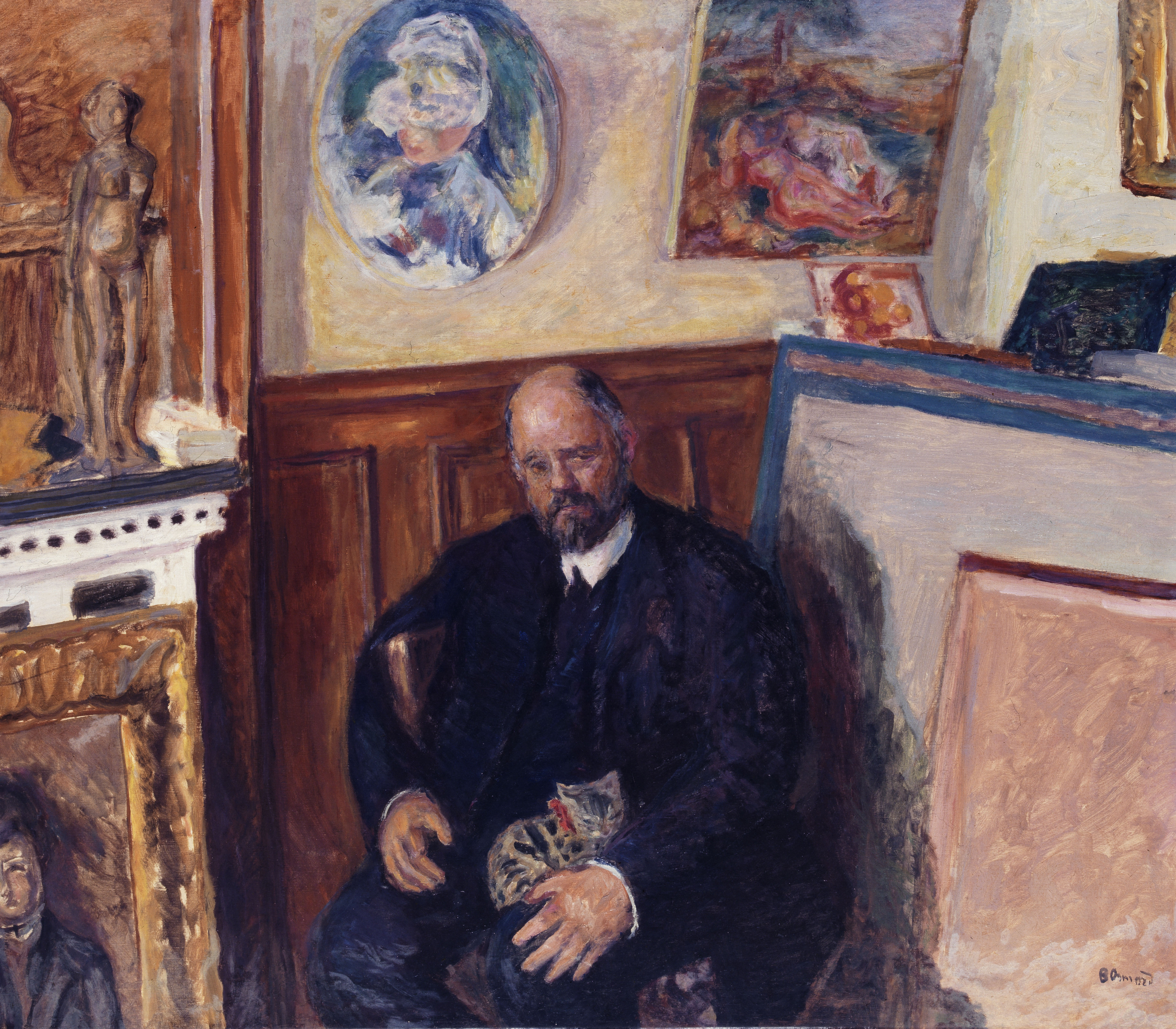
- Artist: Pierre Bonnard
- Year: c.1924
- Medium: Oil on canvas
- Dimensions: 96,5 cm × 111 cm (380 in × 44 in)
- Location: Petit Palais; Paris

Portrait of Ambroise Vollard with a Cat is an oil-on-canvas painting by the French artist Pierre Bonnard, executed c. 1924. It is housed now in the Petit Palais in Paris. Bonnard often painted its subject, the art dealer Ambroise Vollard. He is seen seated in a room, with a cat on his lap, surrounded by works of art, several paintings and a sculpture.
