= Portrait of Ambroise Vollard (Cézanne) =

1899 painting by Paul Cézanne

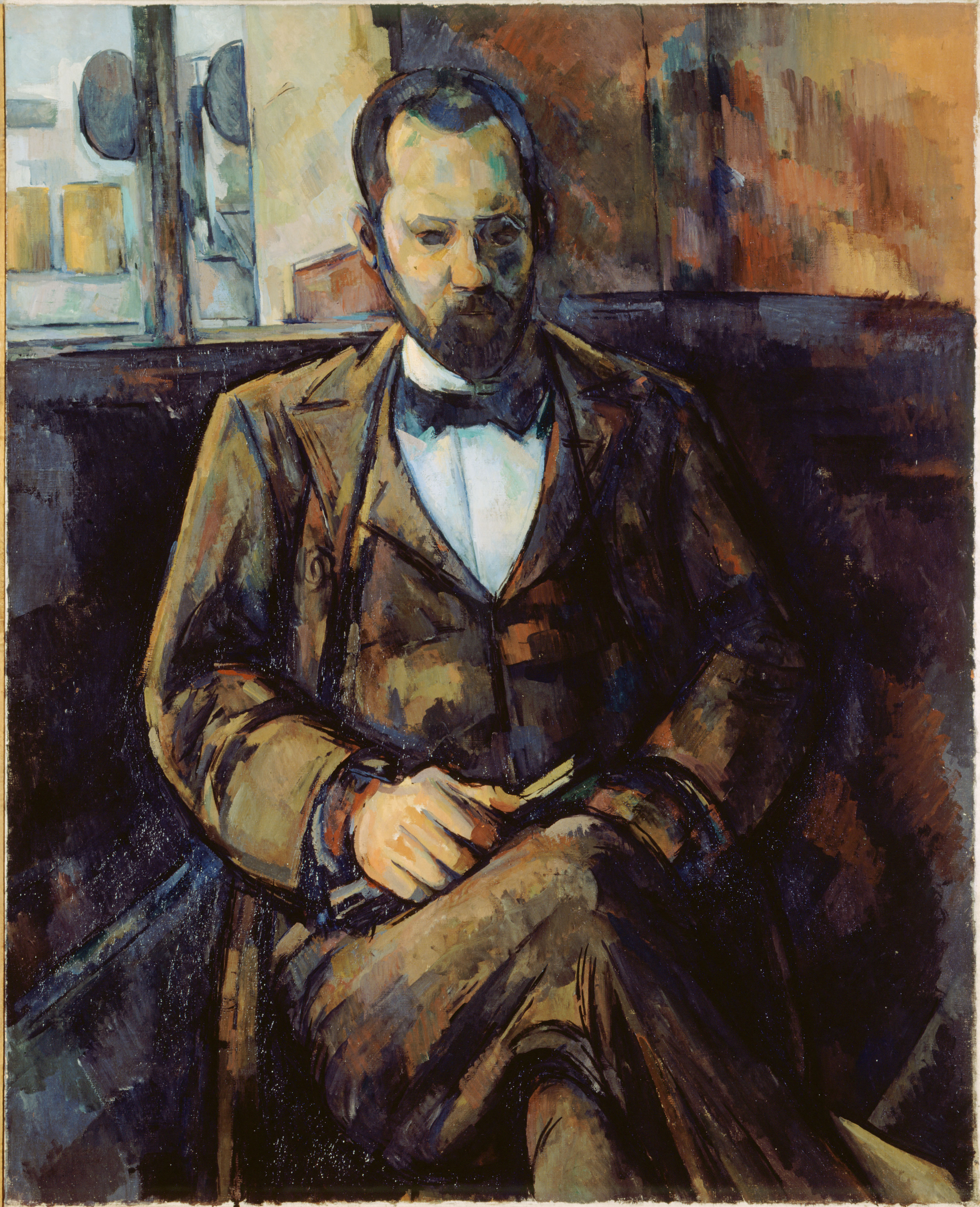
- Artist: Paul Cézanne
- Year: 1899
- Medium: Oil on canvas
- Dimensions: 101 cm × 81 cm (40 in × 32 in)
- Location: Petit Palais, Paris

Portrait of Ambroise Vollard is an 1899 oil-on-canvas portrait by Paul Cézanne of his art dealer Ambroise Vollard. It was bequeathed by Vollard on his death to the Petit Palais in Paris, where it is still housed today. Like many of his portraits, the Portrait of Ambroise Vollard displays the significant role of the subject in Cézanne's life, and specifically, the artist's gratitude for promoting his work and establishing his reputation as an artist.

== Background ==
Ambroise Vollard was instrumental in raising Cézanne from an obscure painter to a renowned artist. Like many modern masters of the 19th Century, Cézanne benefited from Vollard's reputation and influence as an avant-garde and anti-establishment art dealer. After noticing Cezanne's work in the window of Julien (Père) Tanguy's paint shop in Montmartre, Vollard was instantly struck by it and had the ambition to exhibit the artist's work. He recalled, "I felt as though I had been punched in the stomach." At the time, Cézanne was in his mid-sixties, living in Provence, and was still unknown within the art world. However, Vollard managed to track him down. He secured approximately 150 works from Cézanne's son, who acted as his father's business manager. Vollard hosted Cézanne's first solo exhibition in November 1895, which transformed Cézanne's status and solidified his reputation as a master. Following the exhibition, many artists purchased Cézanne's artwork. The exhibition not only made Vollard wealthy, but also established Cézanne as one of the most influential artists of his time. Vollard presented Cézanne's work in at least two subsequent exhibitions and acted as dealer for about two-thirds of his work.

Cézanne's approach to portraiture has been likened to his still life paintings of fruit, in that he rendered the subject in terms of round geometric forms and was only interested in depicting what he could see in front of him, rather than conveying the subject's mood or status. For this portrait, Vollard was made to sit completely still in silence for hours (from roughly 8 a.m. till as late as 11:30 p.m.) over the course of 115 sessions, by balancing on a stool on top of a platform. He recalled how Cézanne reacted when, during one long sitting, he shifted his position, causing the artist to demand, "Do I have to tell you again you must sit like an apple? Does an apple move?"

The Portrait of Ambroise Vollard is one of the first portraits of Vollard and was the only portrait to have been commissioned by him. Despite the long hours invested in its creation, the work was eventually abandoned by Cézanne and remained unfinished. The painting was treasured by Vollard until his death, at which point he bequeathed it to the Petit Palais.

== Description ==
The portrait depicts Vollard in a seated pose, with one leg crossed over the other, one hand placed on a book laid in his lap and the other in his pocket. The subject wears a brown suit and bow tie and displays a blank stare that has been attributed to exhaustion from sitting for too many long hours. Vollard is depicted seated in Cézanne's studio and is partly illuminated by the window on the left of the painting. The painting is oil on canvas in the Post-Impressionist style. The dimensions of the canvas are 101 × 81 cm.

Vollard's portrait was created using bright patches of colour to highlight his face and large forehead, in stark contrast to his black eyes, which have been described as having an inhuman and alienated quality. Vollard's eyes have been likened to holes in a mask, a common trait seen in many of Cézanne's portraits.

The painting features two patches of bare canvas, which are hardly noticeable, but can be seen on the right hand of the subject. During his sittings for the portrait, Vollard asked Cézanne about the two unfinished patches on the hand, but was told that the artist would need more time to return to the Louvre, in order to spend time studying the Old Masters. Cézanne explained that, "If the copy I'm making at the Louvre turns out well, perhaps I will be able tomorrow to find the exact tone to cover up those spots. Don't you see, Monsieur Vollard, that if I put something there by guesswork, I might have to paint the whole canvas over starting from that point?" The patches were never painted by Cézanne, who maintained his refusal to add more color to avoid the possibility of ruining the portrait and having to start the entire painting again. The unfinished state of the painting is therefore considered to be an example of his perfectionist approach and willingness to accept unfinished paintings that satisfied him.

== Other portraits of Vollard ==
As a prominent art dealer, Ambroise Vollard had great influence on the fortunes of many great artists of the period, including Edgas Degas, Paul Gauguin, Maurice Deni, André Derain, Pierre-Auguste Renoir and Pablo Picasso. He was therefore depicted in various portraits by several of these artists. Pierre Bonnard painted Dinner at Vollard's (Vollard's Cellar; c. 1907) in which Vollard appears at the head of the table. He was also painted in several portraits by Renoir in 1899, 1908 and 1917, and also in a Cubist portrait by Picasso in 1910. Picasso stated, "the most beautiful woman who ever lived never had her portrait painted, drawn, or engraved any oftener than Vollard".

== See also ==
- List of paintings by Paul Cézanne
- Ambroise Vollard
- Portrait of Ambroise Vollard (Picasso)
