= Bačina =

- Village
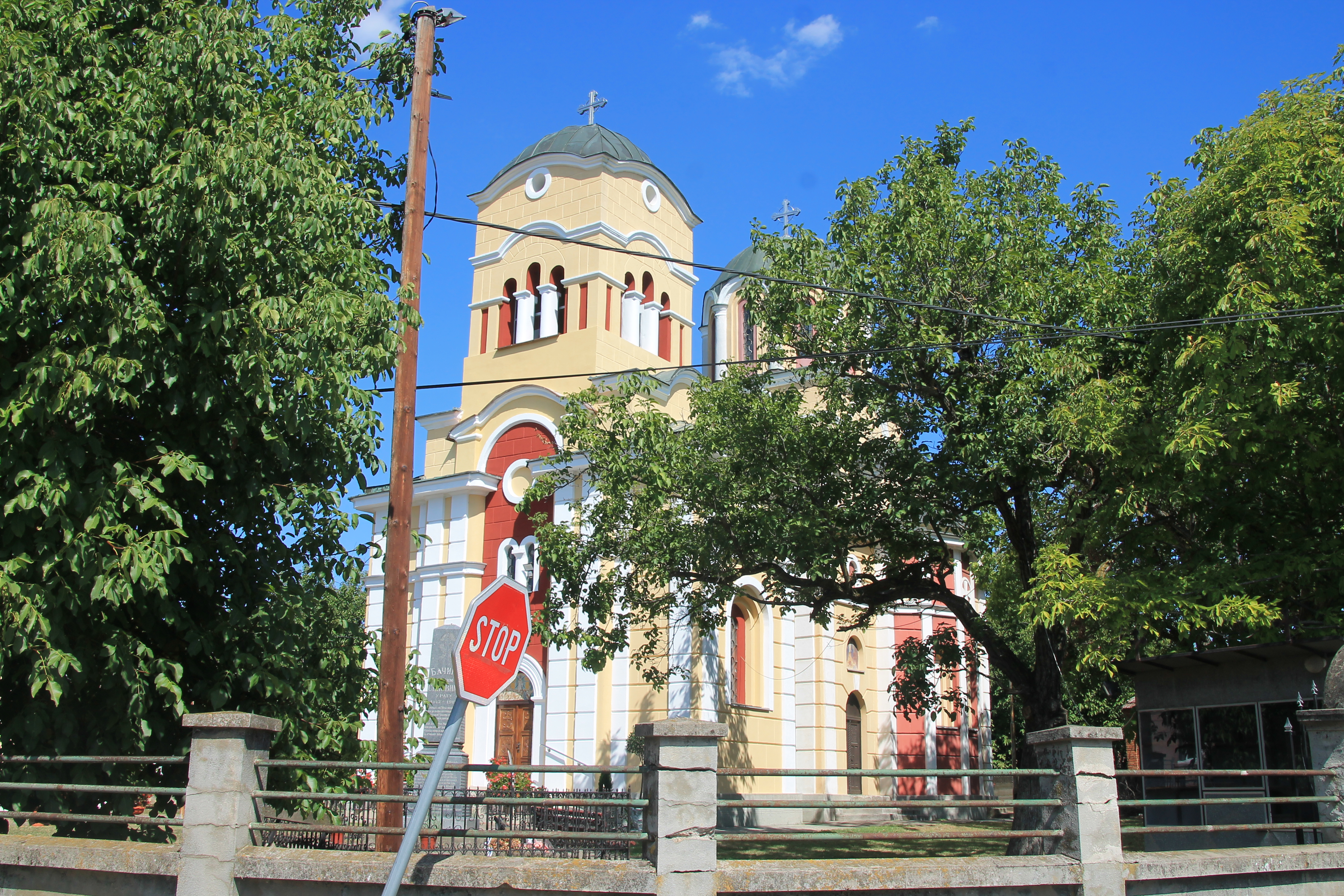

- Location within Serbia
- Coordinates: 43°43′N 21°17′E
- Country: Serbia
- District: Rasina District
- Municipality: Varvarin

Population (2002)
  - Total: 2,381
- Time zone: UTC+1 (CET)
  - Summer (DST): UTC+2 (CEST)

Bačina is a village in the municipality of Varvarin, Serbia. According to the 2002 census, the village has a population of 2,381 people. Bacina is known as a major wine-making destination in Serbia.
