= Bibliography of Jacques Rivette =

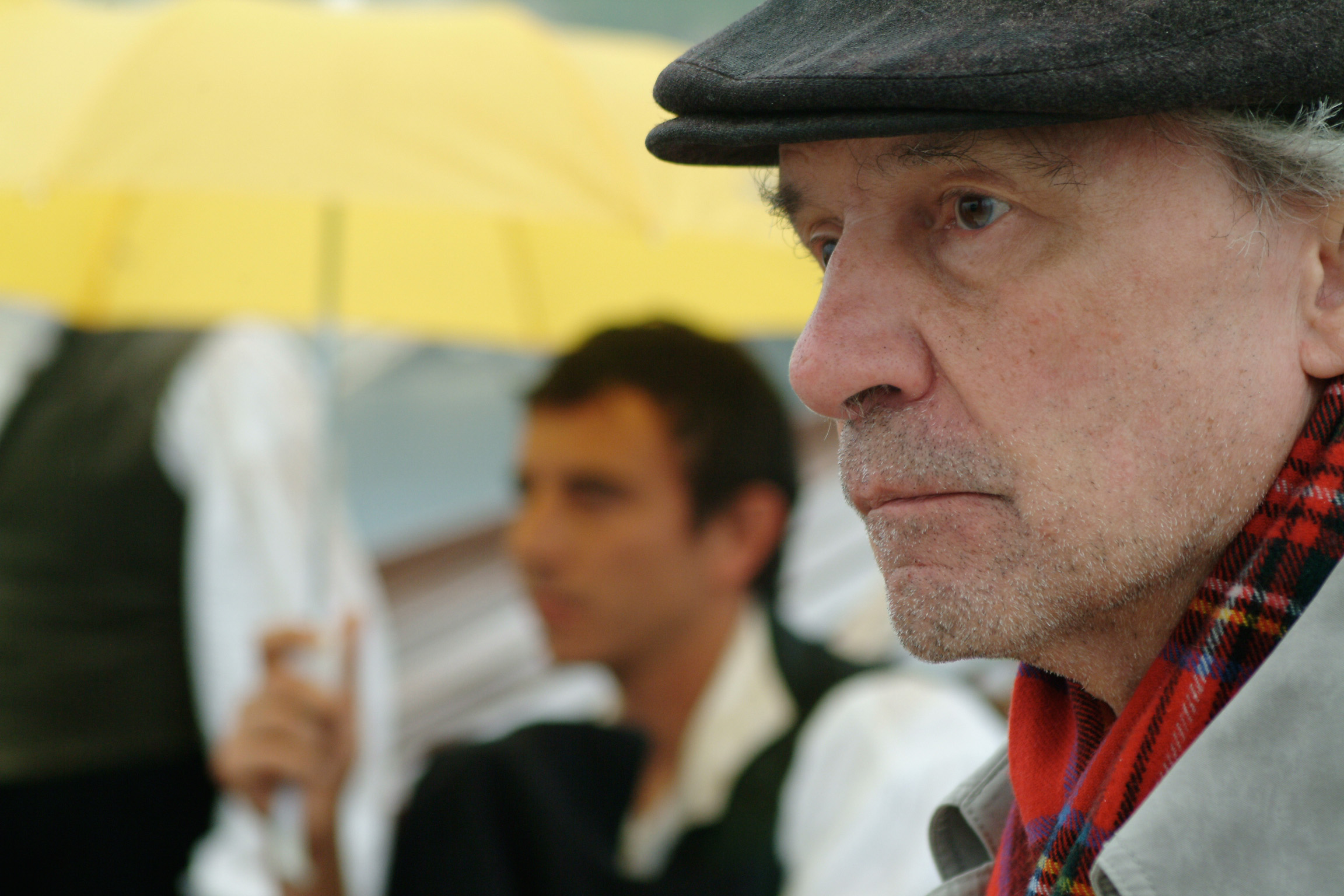
Rivette in 2006

This is a bibliography of articles and books by or about the director and film critic Jacques Rivette.

== Articles by Rivette ==
=== Bulletin du ciné-club du quartier Latin ===
Title	Year	Issue number	Subject	Ref.
"Nous ne sommes plus innocents"	March 1950	1	essay on film language	
	1950	4	essay on Kenji Mizoguchi	

=== La Gazette du cinéma ===
Title	Year	Issue number	Subject	Ref.
"L'Homme du sud"	June 1950	2	review of The Southerner	
"Bilan pour Biarritz"	October 1950	4	criticism of the Festival du film maudit	
"Under Capricorn d'Alfred Hitchcock"	October 1950	4	review of Under Capricorn	
"Les Malheurs d'Orphee"	November 1950	5	review of Orphée	
"Un homme véritable d'Alexandre Stolper"	November 1950	5	review of Un homme véritable	

=== Cahiers du cinéma ===
Title	Date	Issue number	Subject	Ref.
"Un nouveau visage de la pudeur"	February 1953	20	review of Chtche Droe Leto	
"Génie de Howard Hawks"	May 1953	23	essay on Howard Hawks	
"L'art de la fugue"	August–September 1953	26	article on I Confess	
"De l'invention"	October 1953	27	review of The Lusty Men	
"Le masque"	November 1953	28	review of The Earrings of Madame de…	
"Rencontre avec Otto Preminger"	December 1953	29	interview with Otto Preminger	
"The Naked Spur"	December 1953	29	review of The Naked Spur	
"F comme femme"	Christmas 1953	30	co-writers: Lotte H. Eisner, François Truffaut, Philippe Demonsablon, Jean-José Richer, Michel Dorsday and Frédéric Laclos	
"l'âge des metteurs en scène"	January 1954	31	essay on Cinemascope	
"Entretien avec Jacques Becker"	February 1954	32	interview with Jacques Becker, co-writer: François Truffaut	
"L'Essentiel"	February 1954	32	review of Angel Face	
"Entretien avec Jean Renoir"	April 1954	34	interview with Jean Renoir part 1, co-writer: François Truffaut	
"Entretien avec Jean Renoir"	May 1954	34	interview with Jean Renoir part 2, co-writer: François Truffaut	
"Cinépsychopathia sexualis"	December 1954	42	inventory of films related to sexuality, compiled by entire staff	
"Entretien avec Abel Gance"	January 1955	43	interview with Abel Gance, co-writer: François Truffaut	
"Lettre sur Roberto Rossellini"	April 1955	46	letter from Roberto Rossellini	
"La recherche de l'absolu"	November 1955	52	review of Les Mauvaises Rencontres	
"Après Agesilas"	December 1955	53	review of Land of the Pharaohs	
"Hollywood, petite île..."	Christmas 1955	54	essay on Max Ophüls, co-writer: François Truffaut	
"Dictionnaire des réalisateurs américains contemporains"	Christmas 1955	54	review of recent American cinema, co-writers: Claude Chabrol, Charles Bitsch, Jacques Doniol-Valcroze and François Truffaut	
"Notes sur une revolution"	Christmas 1955	54	essay on American filmmakers	
"Entretien avec Howard Hawks"	February 1956	56	interview with Howard Hawks, co-writers: François Truffaut and Jacques Becker	
"Cinémathèque"	March 1956	57	review of Woman in the Moon	
"Faut-il brûler Harry?"	April 1956	58	review of The Trouble With Harry	
"Rencontre avec Joshua Logan"	December 1956	65	interview with Joshua Logan, co-writer: Charles Bitsch	
"Six personnages en quête d'auteurs, débat sur le cinéma français"	May 1957	71	discussion on French cinema, with Andre Bazin, Jacques Doniol-Valcroze, Pierre Kast, Roger Leenhardt, Éric Rohmer and Rivette	
"Biographie de Max Ophüls"	June 1957	72	biography of Max Ophüls, co-writer Charles Bitsch	
"Entretien avec Max Ophüls"	June 1957	72	interview with Max Ophüls, co-writer: François Truffaut	
"En attendant les Godons"	July 1957	73	review of Saint Joan	
"La Main"	November 1957	76	review of Beyond A Reasonable Doubt	
"Nouvel entretien avec Jean Renoir"	Christmas 1957	78	interview with Jean Renoir, co-writer: François Truffaut	
"Bio-filmographie de Jean Renoir"	Christmas 1957	78	essay on Jean Renoir	
"Que viva Eisenstein"	January 1958	79	review of Que Viva Mexico	
"L' énigme des deux Nosferatu: Post Scriptum"	January 1958	79	review of Nosferatu and Foolish Wives, co-writer: Lotte Eisner	
"Mizoguchi vu d'ici"	March 1958	81	essay on Kenji Mizoguchi	
"Rétrospective Mizoguchi"	March 1958	81	discussion of Kenji Mizoguchi, co-writers: Charles Bitsch, Louis Marcorelles, Luc Moullet and Éric Rohmer	
"Sainte Cécile"	April 1958	82	review of Bonjour Tristesse	
"Good bye"	May 1958	83	review of Sayonara	
"L'âme au ventre"	June 1958	84	review of Summer Interlude	
"Rencontre avec Gene Kelly"	July 1958	85	interview with Gene Kelly, co-writer: Charles Bitsch	
"Paris nous appartient"	December 1958	90	dialogue of Paris Belongs to Us (first sequence), co-writer: Jean Gruault	
"Entretien avec Roberto Rossellini"	April 1959	94	interview with Roberto Rossellini, co-writer: Fereydoun Hoveyda	
"Du côté de chez Antoine"	May 1959	95	review of The 400 Blows	
"Hiroshima notre amour"	July 1959	97	discussion on Hiroshima, Mon Amour, co-writers: Jean Domarchi, Jacques Doniol-Valcroze, Jean-Luc Godard, Pierre Kast and Éric Rohmer	
"Entretien avec Fritz Lang"	September 1959	99	interview with Fritz Lang, co-writer: Jean Domarchi	
"Anatomie d'une nation"	November 1959	101	review of Trial	
"La Mort aux trousses"	April 1960	106	review of Testament of Orpheus	
"Keaton"	September 1960	111	article on Buster Keaton	
"Art et Essai"	November 1960	113	essay on arthouse cinema	
"Entretien avec Alexandre Astruc"	February 1961	116	interview with Alexandre Astruc, co-writer: Éric Rohmer	
"De l'abjection"	June 1961	120	review of Kapò	
"Entretien avec Resnais et Robbe-Grillet"	September 1961	123	interview with Alain Resnais and Alain Robbe-Grillet, co-writer: André S. Labarthe	
"Débarbouillage"	December 1962	138	discussion on new French filmmakers with Michel Delahaye, Jacques Doniol-Valcroze, Jean Douchet, Claude de Givray, Jean-Luc Godard, Fereydoun Hoveyda, Pierre Kast, André S. Labarthe, Luc Moullet, Éric Rohmer and François Truffaut	
"Note sur l'insuccès commercial"	May 1963	143	review of The Trial of Joan of Arc	
"Cinéma et nouvelle musique"	July 1963	145	review of Straub-Huillet's Machorka-Muff	
"Revoir Verdoux"	August 1963	146	review of Monsieur Verdoux	
"Entretien avec Roland Barthes"	September 1963	147	interview with Roland Barthes, co-writer: Michel Delahaye	
"Les malheurs de Muriel"	November 1963	149	review of Muriel, co-writers: Pierre Kast, Claude Ollier, André S. Labarthe, Jean-Louis Comolli, François Weyergans, Jean Domarchi and Jean-André Fieschi	
"Judex"	November 1963	149	review of Judex	
"Sept hommes à débattre"	December 1963-January 1964	150-151	discussion on American cinema, co-writers: Luc Moullet, Jean-Luc Godard, Claude Chabrol, François Truffaut, Pierre Kast and Jacques Doniol-Valcroze	
"Directed by: 60+60 (+1) Cinéastes"	December 1963-January 1964	150-151	short biographies of American directors, co-written by entire Cahiers staff.	
"Les enfants terribles"	February 1964	152	review of Les Enfants Terribles	
"Entretien avec Pierre Boulez"	February 1964	152	interview with Pierre Boulez, co-writer: François Weyergans	
"Max phagocyte"	February 1964	152	review of Laugh with Max Linder	
"Le journal entre les lignes"	April 1964	154	discussion on Diary of a Chambermaid, co-writers: André S. Labarthe, Jean Narboni, Michel Delahaye, Jean-Louis Comolli	
"Suède- France: 2-0"	May 1964	155	essay on Swedish cinema	
"Entretien avec Claude Lévi-Strauss"	June 1964	156	interview with Claude Lévi-Strauss, co-writer: Michel Delahaye	
"Le féminin singulier"	October 1964	159	review of The Ape Woman	
"D’une lettre de René Clair, adressée à Jacques Rivette"	January 1965	161-162	reply to letter from René Clair	
"Hallali"	February 1965	163	essay on the Paris reception of Gertrud	
"Le faux pas"	March 1965	164	review of Le Faux Pas	
"Island of the Blue Dolphins (L’Ue des dauphins bleus)"	March 1965	164	review of Island of the Blue Dolphin	
"Le calme"	March 1965	164	essay on Soviet films	
"Father goose (Grand méchant loup appelle)"	April 1965	165	review of Father Goose	
"Les pieds dans le plâtre"	April 1965	165	review of Les pieds dans le plâtre	
"The troublemaker (Le trouble fête)"	April 1965	165	review of The Troublemaker	
"The unsinkable Molly Brown (La reine du Colorado)"	April 1965	165	review of The Unsinkable Molly Brown	
"Ring of Spics (Fabrique d’espions)"	May–June 1965	166-167	review of Ring of Spies	
"Une aventure de la parole"	December 1965	173	interview with Marcel Pagnol, co-writers: Jean-André Fieschi and Gérard Guégan	
"Pagnol au travail par ses collaborateurs"	December 1965	173	interview with members of Pagnol's film crew, co-writers: Jean-André Fieschi, Gérard Guégan and André S. Labarthe	
"Renoir le Patron"	January 1967	186	transcript of TV interview with Jean Renoir, co-writer: André S. Labarthe	
"Le champ libre"	February 1968	198	Interview with Vera Chytilova, co-writer: Michel Delahaye	
"Conférence de presse"	March 1968	199	Published press conference on the Henri Langlois scandal of 1968, co-writers: Jean-Luc Godard, Claude Chabrol, Alexandre Astruc, Jean Renoir, Georges Kiejman, Pierre Kast, Jean Rouch, Jacques Doniol-Valcroze, Jean-Paul Le Chanois, Nicholas Ray, Maurice Lemaitre, Henry Chapier, Jean Jabely, Simone Signoret and Marcel Carné	
"Cerclé sous vide"	September 1968	204	interview with Philippe Garrel	
"Le temps déborde"	September 1968	204	Rivette was interviewed by Jacques Aumont, Jean-Louis Connolli, Jean Narboni and Sylvie Pierre	
"Le départ pour Mars"	October 1968	205	interview with Shirley Clarke, co-writer: Michel Delahaye	
"Concours"	January 1969	208	review of Audition	
"Entretien avec Walerian Borowczyk"	February 1969	209	interview with Walerian Borowczyk, co-writers: Michel Delahaye and Sylvie Pierre	
"Grazle Zia (Merci Léa)"	February 1969	209	review of Grazie Zia	
"Montage"	March 1969	210	discussion on montage, co-writers: Sylvie Pierre and Jean Narboni	
"Calcutta"	April 1969	211	interview with Louis Malle, co-writers: Jean-Louis Comolli and Jean Narboni	
"Play Dirty (Enfants de salauds)"	April 1969	211	review of Play Dirty	
"The touchables"	April 1969	211	review of The Touchables	
"Le miel sauvage"	April 1969	211	review of Soviet films	
"Bice skoro propest Sveta"	June 1969	213	review of Soviet films	
"Dieu a Choisi Paris"	October 1969	216	review of Dieu a Choisi Paris	
"Marguerite Duras:" La destruction la parole"	November 1969	217	interview with Marguerite Duras, co-writer: Jean Narboni	
"Jean Renoir vous parle de son art"	1979	Hors série 4	Reprint of Rivette's 1961 TV interview with Renoir: Jean Renoir parle de son art	
"La recherche du relative"	1979	Hors série 4	Reprint of Rivette's 1966 interview with Renoir for "Jean Renoir le patron"	
"La règle et l'exception"	1979	Hors série 4	Reprint of Rivette's 1966 interview with Renoir	
"Jacques Rivette"	October 1987	400		
"Rivette à Cannes"	1991	Hors série 15	Transcript of Rivette's press conference for La belle noiseuse	

=== Arts Magazine ===
Title	Year	Issue number	Subject	Ref.
"Une film d'avant garde"	September 7, 1955	532	review of Les mauvaises rencontres	
"Capitaine Mystère de Douglas Sirk"	September 28, 1955	535	review of Captain Lightfoot	
"À l'ombre des potences (Run for Cover), film américain de Nicholas Ray"	October 5, 1955	536	review of Run for Cover	
"Ange ou démon, film de José Ferrer"	October 5, 1955	536	review of The Shrike	
"Le cinéma américain renaît"	October 19, 1955	538	essay on French criticism of recent American cinema	
"Hélène de Troie de Robert Wise"	February 8, 1956	554	review of Helen of Troy	
"Á la cinémathèque tour le soirs: L'âge d'or allemande"	February 15, 1956	555	essay on German Expressionist films	
"Il Bidone de Federico Fellini"	February 29, 1956	557	review of Il bidone	
"Les Inconnus dans la ville de Richard Fleischer"	March 7, 1956	558	review of Violent Saturday	
"Fièvre sur Anatahan de Joseph von Sternberg"	March 14, 1956	559	review of Anatahan	
"Les Rats de Robert Siodmak"	March 21, 1956	560	review of Die Ratten	
"L'example d'Eisenstein"	March 28, 1956	561	essay on Jean Mitry's book on Sergei Eisenstein	
"La Maison des otages de William Wyler"	March 28, 1956	561	review of The Desperate Hours	
"La Sorcière de André Michel"	April 18, 1956	564	review of La Sorcière	
"Premier prix à La Joconde d'Henri Gruel" AKA "Tours 57: un festival sans suspense. 1er prix à La Joconde d'Henri Gruel"	November 27, 1957	646	essay on films of the Tours Film Festival, including Les Mistons	
"Le Désordre et la nuit: Obscur fourre-tout"	May 28, 1958	672	review of Le désordre et la nuit	

=== Other works ===
Title	Date	Publisher	Subject	Ref.
"L’acte et l’acteur"	1950	unpublished	essay on the importance of actors	
Preface to "What is Cinema?", Volume IV	1962	Editions du Cerf	fourth volume by Andre Bazin	
"Paris gehort Uns"	1968	Neue Filmkunst	German-language published script of Paris Belongs to Us	
"Pour H. L."	January 21, 1977	Le Monde	essay on Henri Langlois and the Cinémathèque Française	

== Books ==
=== Books about Rivette ===
- April, Adriano (1974). II cinema di Jacques Rivette. Pesaro, Italy: 10th Festival of New Cinema.
- Armas, Miguel; Chessel, Luc (2018). Jacques Rivette Textes critiques. Post-éditions. ISBN 979-10-92616-20-0.
- De Pascale, Goffredo, ed. (2003). Jacques Rivette. Milan, Italy: Il Castoro. ISBN 978-8-880-33256-5.
- Deschamps, Hélène (2001). Jacques Rivette: Théâtre, amour, cinéma. Paris, France: L’Harmattan. ISBN 978-2-747-51029-5.
- Dosi, Francesca (2014). Trajectoires balzaciennes dans le cinema de Jacques Rivette. La Madeleine, France: LettMotif. ISBN 978-2-919070-86-2.
- Frappat, Hélène (2001). Jacques Rivette, secret compris. Paris, France: Cahiers du cinéma. ISBN 9782866422813.
- Giuffrida, Daniela; Toffetti, Sergio (1991). Jacques Rivette: La Regle du jeu. Turin, Italy: Centre Culturel Français de Turin/Museo Nazinale del Cinema de Torino.
- Jardonnet, Evelyne (2006). Poetique de la singularite au cinema: Une lecture croisee de Jacques Rivette et Maurice Pialat. Paris, France: L’Harmattan. ISBN 978-2-296-01356-8.
- Morrey, Douglas; Smith, Allison (2010). Jacques Rivette (French Film Directors). Manchester, England: Manchester University Press. ISBN 978-0-719-07484-4.
- Rivette, Jacques; Frappat, Hélène (2002). Trois films fantômes de Jacques Rivette: "Phénix", suivi de "L'an II" et "Marie et Julien". Cahiers du cinéma. ISBN 978-2-86642-322-3.
- Rosenbaum, Jonathan, ed. (1977). Jacques Rivette: Texts and Interviews; translation by Amy Gateff and Tom Milne. London, UK: BFI Publishing. ISBN 978-0-851-70064-9.
- Wiles, Mary (2012). Jacques Rivette (Contemporary Film Directors). Champaign, Illinois: University of Illinois Press. ISBN 978-0-252-07834-7.
- Zea, Zahra Tavassoli (2019). Balzac Reframed: The Classical and Modern Faces of Éric Rohmer and Jacques Rivette. Springer Nature. ISBN 978-3-030-30615-1.

=== Books about the French New Wave ===
- Baecque, Antoine de (2009). La Nouvelle Vague: Portrait d'une jeunesse. Paris, France: Flammarion. ISBN 978-2-081-22163-5.
- Douchet, Jean; Anger, Cédric (1998). Nouvelle Vague. Paris, France: Cinémathèque française. ISBN 978-1-564-66057-2.
- Marie, Michel (1997). La Nouvelle Vague: Une ecole artistique. Paris, France: Editions Nathan. ISBN 978-2-091-90690-4.
- Monaco, James (1976). The New Wave: Truffaut, Godard, Chabrol, Rohmer, Rivette. New York: Oxford University Press. ISBN 978-0-195-01992-6.
- Neupert, Richard (2007). A History of the French New Wave Cinema. Milwaukee, Wisconsin: University of Wisconsin Press. ISBN 978-0-29921-704-4.

=== Books with descriptions of Rivette ===
- Baecque, Antoine de (2010). Godard: Biographie. Paris, France: Fayard/Pluriel. ISBN 978-2-818-50132-0.
- Baecque, Antoine de; Herpe, Noël (2016). Éric Rohmer: A Biography. New York: Columbia University Press. ISBN 978-0-231-17558-6.
- Baecque, Antoine de; Toubiana, Serge (1999). Truffaut: A Biography. New York: Knopf. ISBN 978-0-375-40089-6.
- Brody, Richard (2008). Everything is Cinema: The Working Life of Jean-Luc Godard. New York: Metropolitan Books. ISBN 978-0-8050-8015-5.
- Gallagher, Tag (1998). The Adventures of Roberto Rossellini. New York: Da Capo Press. ISBN 0-306-80873-0.
- MacCabe, Colin (2003). Godard: A Portrait of the Artist at Seventy. New York: Farrar, Straus and Giroux. ISBN 978-0-571-21105-0.
- Wakeman, John (1988). World Film Directors, Volume 2. New York: The H. W. Wilson Company. ISBN 978-0-824-20757-1.

== Films about Rivette ==
- Boujut, Michel; Ventura, Claude (1989). Rivette: Histories du titres (TV). Cinéma, Cinéma, Antenna 2.
- Denis, Claire; Daney, Serge (24 February 1994). Jacques Rivette, le veilleur, part 1: "Le Jour", part 2: "La Nuit" (TV). Cinéma, de notre temps, Arte.
- Stevenin, Jean-François (1983). Rivette & Stevenin vont au bistrot (TV). Cinéma, Cinéma, Antenna 2.
