= Cine Club (TV program) =

Canadian short film television series

- Presented by: Dennis Sweeting (1964); Al Hamel (1965); Lloyd Robertson (1966); Oscar Burritt (1967)
- Country of origin: Canada
- Original language: English
- No. of seasons: 3

Production
- Producers: Don Brown (1964); Terry Kyne (1965); Doug Davidson (1966); Rosalind Farber (1967)
- Running time: 30 minutes

Original release
- Network: CBC Television
- Release: 11 August 1964 – 27 June 1967

Cine Club is a Canadian short film television program that aired on CBC Television from 1964 to 1967.

== Premise ==
Each episode included up to three short films originating from various nations in various styles from documentaries to cartoons. The debut film was Les Mistons by François Truffaut of France. Canadian content included Jack Kuper's Run. The Running Jumping & Standing Still Film by Richard Lester and Peter Sellers of the United Kingdom also aired during the first season as did works by Ludovic Kennedy (The Sleeping Ballerina) and Ernest Pintoff (The Violinist and The Shoes).

Many of the Cine Club films were not previously broadcast or were rarely accessible to Canadians. The program featured different hosts and producers each season; Rosalind Farber chose the films for broadcast and became Cine Club's producer in the final season.

== Scheduling ==
This half-hour program was broadcast as follows (times in North American Eastern):

Day	Time	Season run
Tuesdays	10:30 p.m.	11 August to 29 September 1964
Sundays	7:00 p.m.	27 June to 5 September 1965
Sundays	7:00 p.m.	19 June to 4 September 1966
Thursdays	10:00 p.m.	6 April to 27 June 1967
