= The Street Is Ours! =

- French: À nous la rue
- Directed by: Moustapha Dao
- Produced by: Moustapha Dao, D.C.N.Toys & Games
- Release date: 1987
- Running time: 15 minutes
- Country: Burkina Faso

The Street Is Ours! (French: À nous la rue) is a 1987 Burkinabé film. The film was awarded the "Grand Prix du Jury" at the Entrevues Belfort film festival in 1987 and was shown at the Clermont-Ferrand International Short Film Festival in 1988.

== Plot ==
The film depicts the after-school life of children in Ouagadougou.

When school is out, the children take over the street. This is where they learn to fight and steal, where they fall in love and play football, where they dance, cook, make toys or musical instruments, keep shop... All the resourcefulness of these children from Burkina Faso is featured in a series of quick and humorous sketches.
