= Jacob Reynolds =

American actor

- Born: St. Petersburg, Florida, U.S.
- Occupation: Actor
- Years active: 1993–present
- Spouse: Helen Spaw (m. 2006)

Jacob Reynolds is an American actor. He is best known for his role as Solomon in the experimental cult film Gummo (1997).

== Career ==
Jacob Reynolds began acting at age four. His career started with an American television commercial for Ritz Crackers. In 2007, he appeared in Chris Fuller's Gotham Award nominated independent feature Loren Cass. In addition to his acting talents, Reynolds is a trumpet player and a certified aviator.

He appeared in the 1994 film The Road to Wellville, playing a young George Kellog in several flashback sequences (the adult George Kellog was played by Dana Carvey). He also had small roles in Life with Mikey (1993), Safe Men (1998), and For Love of the Game (1999). Reynolds starred in the 1997 Harmony Korine movie Gummo. He also appeared in the 2012 action-thriller The Aggression Scale, along with Derek Mears.

Reynolds is the writer of the webtoon series Perish with illustrator Esfi Morales.
