= Chris Fuller (director) =

American film director

- Born: Christopher Elwin Fuller; October 8, 1982 (age 42); St. Petersburg, Florida, U.S.
- Occupation: Filmmaker
- Years active: 2006–present

Christopher Elwin Fuller is an American film director, writer, and producer.

== Background ==
Fuller was born in St. Petersburg, Florida graduated from the Canterbury School of Florida in 2001 and attended the University of Central Florida from 2001 to 2004.

Fuller holds a black belt in taekwondo under Master Yong Jun Lee and trained in St. Petersburg, Florida under tang soo do master Michael Kinney and mixed martial artist Shane Dunn.

== Career ==
In 2006, he released Loren Cass, which he wrote, directed, produced and starred in under the name Lewis Brogan. The film is set against the backdrop of the St. Petersburg, Florida riots of 1996. Fuller wrote the film at the age of 15 and filmed it in 2004 at the age of 21. The movie was released theatrically and on DVD in 2009 by Kino International. The film played in competition at Dennis Hopper's CineVegas Film Festival, the Filmmakers of the Present section of the Locarno International Film Festival and the Museum of Modern Art.

In 2023, ESPN announced that Fuller is directing and producing Gracie, a multi-part documentary series on the Gracie family, founders of Brazilian Jiu-Jitsu and the UFC, with Greg O'Connor, Guy Ritchie, Ivan Atkinson and Nanette Burstein executive producing.

== Awards and recognition ==
Fuller was nominated for an IFP Gotham Award, a Locarno Golden Leopard for Filmmakers of the Present, the Emerging Filmmaker Award at the Starz Denver Film Festival and won the One+One Award for use of music in a feature film at Janine Bazin's Entrevues Belfort film festival in France.

Fuller was profiled as one of 100 new directors representing the future of film in Take 100: The Future of Film, 100 New Directors, a book published by Phaidon Press and curated by film festival programmers from around the world.

== Filmography ==
Year	Title	Credited				
Year	Title	Directed	Written	Produced	Edited	Acted
2006	Loren Cass	Yes	Yes	Yes	Yes	Yes
2025	Gracie	Yes	Yes	Yes	—	—
