= Fabianne Therese =

American actress and director

- Born: Fabianne Therese Gstottenmayr; Kansas City, Missouri, U.S.
- Occupation: Actress
- Years active: 2011–present

Fabianne Therese Gstottenmayr is an American actress and director.

== Early life ==
Therese was born in Kansas City, Missouri. Her family often moved when she was growing up, including to Austria, Sri Lanka, Abu Dhabi, and Palm Springs. She originally focused on becoming a track runner before getting involved in acting.

She is a great-great-granddaughter of Ceylonese-Goan newspaper editor and democratic activist Armand de Souza.

== Career ==
Therese is known for starring in several successful independent films including Netflix's Teenage Cocktail (2016), John Dies at the End (2012), Anchor Bay's The Aggression Scale (2012), A Glimpse Inside the Mind of Charles Swan III (2013), and the AMC web series The Trivial Pursuits of Arthur Banks (2011).

== Filmography ==
Year	Title	Role	Notes
2011	The Trivial Pursuits of Arthur Banks	Chloe	
2012	The Aggression Scale	Lauren	
2012	John Dies at the End	Amy	
2012	A Glimpse Inside the Mind of Charles Swan III	Allie (Kirby's Girlfriend)	
2013	Turn into Earth	Fredrica/Fred	
2013	Playing It Cool	College Girl	
2013	Blue Lips	Claire	
2014	Starry Eyes	Erin	
2015	Southbound	Sadie	
2016	Teenage Cocktail	Jules Rae	
2017	Sequence Break	Tess	
2018	Hover	Tanya	
2025	Dolly	Macy	
