= Robert Lachenay =

- Born: 27 May 1930; Paris, France
- Died: 11 October 2005 (aged 75); Andeville, France
- Occupations: Production assistant, film critic
- Years active: 1955–1961 (?)

Robert Lachenay (1930–2005) was a French film critic and film crew member. He was François Truffaut's childhood friend and the inspiration for the character René Bigey in the first two films of the Antoine Doinel film series.

Lachenay attended the same schools as Truffaut, and often let Truffaut stay at his family's home. When interviewed in the documentary François Truffaut: Portraits volés, Lachenay claimed that, unlike the film The 400 Blows, he was more often the leader and troublemaker, with Truffaut as his sidekick.

Lachenay was credited as a film critic who wrote articles for Cahiers du cinéma. However, Truffaut occasionally published under the alias "Robert Lachenay".

Lachenay later worked as a crew member on the early films of Truffaut and Jacques Rivette. He wrote and directed one short film, Le scarabée d'or in 1961, based on an Edgar Allan Poe story.

He died of a heart attack at the age of 75.

== Filmography ==
- Une Visite (1955) – Production Assistant
- Le coup du berger (1956) – Camera Assistant
- Les mistons (1957) – Production Manager
- The 400 Blows (1959) – Assistant Unit Manager
- Paris nous appartient (1960) – Unit Manager
- Tire-au-flanc 62 (1960) – actor
- Le scarabée d'or (1961) – writer, director
- François Truffaut: Correspondance à une voix (1988) – Documentary
- François Truffaut: Portraits volés (1993) – Documentary
- François Truffaut, une autobiographie (2004) – Documentary
