= Loren Cass =

2006 American film directed by Chris Fuller

- Directed by: Chris Fuller
- Written by: Chris Fuller
- Produced by: Frank Craft; Chris Fuller; Kayla Tabish
- Starring: Kayla Tabish; Travis Maynard; Lewis Brogan; Jacob Reynolds; Mike Glausier; Din Thomas; Blag Dahlia; Keith Morris
- Cinematography: William Garcia
- Edited by: Chris Fuller
- Music by: Jimmy Morey
- Release date: August 25, 2006
- Running time: 83 minutes
- Country: United States
- Language: English

Loren Cass is a 2006 American drama film written and directed by Chris Fuller. The film is about adolescents coming to terms with their lives in St. Petersburg, Florida, following the riots that took place in 1996. Loren Cass took ten years to complete.

== Plot ==
The story follows Nicole, Jason and Cale and secondarily The Suicide Kid, The Punk Kid and The Fight Kid, among others through the aftermath of the '96 riots. It features several notable St. Petersburg landmarks including the Sunshine Skyway Bridge, the St. Petersburg Pier, St. Petersburg High School and the house where Jack Kerouac lived prior to his 1969 death.

== Cast ==
It stars Kayla Tabish, Travis Maynard, Lewis Brogan, mixed martial artist/UFC veteran Din Thomas and Jacob Reynolds with narration by Keith Morris (of the band The Circle Jerks) and Blag Dahlia (of the band The Dwarves). The film also includes a live performance by New York punk band Leftöver Crack, which was the first show that included drummer Brandon Kolling in the lineup. Kolling died shortly after shooting wrapped.

In February 2006, independent film-making consultant Robert Hawk joined the film's crew to oversee its release effort. Bob Hawk is best known for discovering Kevin Smith's 1994 comedy Clerks.

== Public reception ==
In 2006 and 2007 the film was screened at Dennis Hopper's CineVegas Film Festival and was selected as one of only 2 non-studio American independent films to screen at the 60th anniversary of the Locarno International Film Festival where it was called "the discovery of the festival" by ARTE Television. Screenings were held at the Helsinki International Film Festival, the Viennale, the Ljubljana International Film Festival, the Gijón International Film Festival, and the Starz Denver International Film Festival.

The film was nominated for an IFP Gotham Award for "Best Film Not Playing in a Theater Near You" and won the One+One Music Award for use of music in a feature film at Janine Bazin's EntreVues Film Festival.

It was referred to in Variety as: "A starkly radical film debut of uncommon power and artistic principle, Chris Fuller's Loren Cass announces a genuinely original film-making talent who literally pulls no punches in his depiction of teen angst and racial warfare on the streets of 1996 St. Petersburg, Fla. Suffused with pessimism and an overarching sense of the loneliness of modern American life, the pic affirms a vital alternative to the usual adolescent drama, making even Larry Clark look tame by comparison." The film was noted for its sequence on top of the Sunshine Skyway Bridge and for using footage of the 1987 suicide of R. Budd Dwyer. The New York Times was also very positive about it and called it "overtly, ingeniously experimental in form" and talked about "the bruised lyricism" of the film being "rooted in intense, even discomfiting, empathy." "Remarkable stuff for a debut film, all the more impressive in that Mr. Fuller wrote the screenplay at 18 and shot the film at 21."
