= A Full Day's Work =

- Directed by: Jean-Louis Trintignant
- Written by: Jean-Louis Trintignant; Vincenzo Labella
- Produced by: Jacques-Eric Strauss
- Starring: Jacques Dufilho; Luce Marquand
- Cinematography: William Lubtchansky
- Edited by: Nicole Lubtchansky
- Music by: Bruno Nicolai
- Color process: Eastmancolor
- Production companies: Cinétel; Euro International Films; Président Films
- Distributed by: Valoria Films
- Release date: 8 March 1973
- Running time: 95 minutes
- Countries: France; Italy
- Language: French

A Full Day's Work (French: Une journée bien remplie) is a 1973 French-Italian comedy film directed by Jean-Louis Trintignant and starring Jacques Dufilho and Luce Marquand.

== Plot ==
The story concerns a baker who has carefully planned the execution of the nine jurors who sent his son to the gallows for murder. Before the police or anyone else can stop him, he calmly does away with each of the nine in a grim but methodical way.

== Cast ==
- Jacques Dufilho - Jean Rousseau
- Luce Marquand - La Mère Rousseau
- Franco Pesce - Le père de Jean Rousseau
- Albin Guichard - Jean Rousseau, 15 ans plus tot
- Andrée Bernard - La mère Rousseau, 15 ans plus tot
- Louis Malignon - Le père Rousseau, 15 ans plus tot
- T. Requenae - Le fils Fernand Rousseau, 15 ans plus tot
- Jacques Doniol-Valcroze - Le juré Jacquemont, l'acteur jouant Hamlet
- Antoine Marin - Le Juré Albert Roux / l'autre Roux
- Pierre Dominique - Le juré maître-nageur
- Vittorio Caprioli - Le Juré Mangiavacca
