= Gummo =

1997 film by Harmony Korine

- Theatrical release poster
- Directed by: Harmony Korine
- Written by: Harmony Korine
- Produced by: Cary Woods
- Starring: Linda Manz; Max Perlich; Jacob Reynolds; Chloë Sevigny; Jacob Sewell; Nick Sutton
- Cinematography: Jean-Yves Escoffier
- Edited by: Christopher Tellefsen
- Production company: Independent Pictures
- Distributed by: Fine Line Features
- Release dates: August 29, 1997 (Telluride); October 17, 1997 (United States)
- Running time: 89 minutes
- Country: United States
- Language: English
- Budget: $1.3 million
- Box office: $116,799

Gummo is a 1997 American experimental drama film written and directed by Harmony Korine (in his directorial debut), and starring Linda Manz, Max Perlich, Jacob Sewell, Jacob Reynolds, Chloë Sevigny, and Nick Sutton. It is set in Xenia, Ohio, a Midwestern American town that had been previously struck by a devastating tornado. The loose narrative follows several main characters who find odd and destructive ways to pass time, interrupted by vignettes depicting other inhabitants of the town.

Gummo was shot in Nashville, Tennessee, on an estimated budget of $1.3 million. It was not given a large theatrical release and failed to generate large box office revenues. It received generally negative reviews from critics, and generated substantial press for its graphic content and stylized, loosely woven narrative. The film has become a cult film, and entered the Criterion Collection in 2024.

== Plot ==
A young boy named Solomon narrates the events of the tornado that devastated the city of Xenia, Ohio. A mute adolescent boy, known as Bunny Boy, wears only pink bunny ears, shorts, and tennis shoes on an overpass in the rain.

A boy carries a cat by the scruff of its neck, and then drowns it in a barrel of water. The film then cuts to a different scene with Tummler — a friend of Solomon — in a wrecked car with a girl. They fondle each other, and Tummler realizes there is a lump in one of the girl's breasts. Tummler and Solomon then ride down a hill on bikes. In narration, Solomon describes Tummler as a boy with "a marvelous persona", whom some people call "downright evil".

Later, Tummler aims an air rifle at a cat. Solomon stops him from killing the cat, protesting that it is a housecat. They leave and the camera follows the cat to its owners' house. The cat is owned by three sisters: teenagers, Dot and Helen, and pre-pubescent Darby. The film cuts back to Tummler and Solomon hunting feral cats, which they deliver to a local grocer who intends to butcher and sell them to a local Chinese restaurant. The grocer tells them that they have a rival in the cat-killing business. Tummler and Solomon buy glue from the grocer, which they use to get high via huffing.

The film then cuts to a scene in which two foul-mouthed young boys dressed as cowboys destroy things in a junkyard. Bunny Boy arrives and the other boys pretend to shoot him dead with cap guns. Bunny Boy plays dead and the boys curse at his corpse, rifle through his pockets, then remove and throw one of his shoes. They grow bored with this and leave Bunny Boy sprawled on the ground.

Tummler and Solomon track down a local boy who is poaching "their" cats. The poacher, named Jarrod Wiggley, is poisoning the cats, rather than shooting them. When Tummler and Solomon break into Jarrod's house with masks and weapons with intent to hurt him, they find photos of the young teen cross-dressing and his elderly grandmother, who is catatonic and attached to life support machinery. Jarrod is forced to care for her, which he had earlier opined was "disgusting". Seeing that Jarrod is not home, Tummler and Solomon decide to leave. Tummler then discovers the grandmother lying in her bed, states that it is "no way to live", and turns off the life support machine.

A number of other scenes are interspersed throughout the film, including: an intoxicated man (played by Korine) flirting with a male dwarf; a man pimping his disabled sister to Solomon and Tummler; the sisters encountering an elderly child molester; a pair of twin boys selling candy door-to-door; a brief conversation with a tennis player who is treating his ADHD; a long scene of Solomon eating dinner while taking a bath in dirty water; a drunken party with arm- and chair-wrestling; and two skinhead brothers boxing each other in their kitchen. There are also a number of even smaller scenes depicting Satanic rituals, footage seemingly from home movies, and conversations containing racial bigotry.

The penultimate scene in the movie is set to the song "Crying" by Roy Orbison, which had been previously mentioned by Tummler as the song his older sibling, who was transgender, would sing (the sibling eventually went to the "Big City" and abandoned him). It begins with Bunny Boy kissing the teenage sisters in a swimming pool, then cuts to Solomon and Tummler shooting the sisters' cat repeatedly with their air rifles in the rain. After showing some home video footage of tornadoes, it cuts to Bunny Boy running towards the camera through a field holding the body of the dead cat, which he shows to the audience, breaking the fourth wall.

The final scene shows a girl, who shaved her eyebrows earlier in the movie, singing "Jesus Loves Me" in bed next to her mother (or sister). The film finally cuts to black as the girl singing is told to "dial it down" and go to bed.

== Cast ==
- Jacob Reynolds as Solomon
- Jacob Sewell as Bunny Boy
- Nick Sutton as Tummler
- Linda Manz as Solomon's mother
- Chloë Sevigny as Dot
- Carisa Glucksman as Helen
- Darby Dougherty as Darby
- Mark Gonzales as Chair wrestler
- Max Perlich as Cole
- Daniel Martin as Jarrod Wiggley
- Harmony Korine as Man on couch

== Production ==
=== Pre-production ===
In writing Gummo, Harmony Korine abandoned traditional three-act plot structure and worked to avoid creating characters of a clear-cut moral dimension. In favor of a collage-like assembly, Korine focused on forming interesting moments and scenes, that when put in succession would become its own unique narrative. To justify such a chaotic assembly, Korine set his film in Xenia, Ohio which had been hit by a tornado in 1974.

To help him achieve his vision, Korine sought out French cinematographer Jean-Yves Escoffier. His work on Les Amants du Pont-Neuf (1991) made a tremendous impression on Korine. Escoffier, who liked the script, worked on Gummo for a fraction of his usual rate.

During the months of pre-production, Korine scouted for locations in his hometown of Nashville, Tennessee, finding unusual and distinctive homes to shoot in. Korine often approached people on the street, in bowling alleys and in fast food restaurants and asked them to play a part in his movie. Korine notes, "This is where I grew up. These people are interesting to me, and I'd never seen them represented on screen in a true way."

Korine's then-girlfriend Chloë Sevigny, who also starred in the film, served as costume designer, mixing pieces that people already owned with items bought at local thrift stores.

The title is an oblique reference to Gummo Marx, the only one of the Marx Brothers who never made a film. As Kim Newman wrote in Empire, "Not only is he not mentioned in this movie, but there's no alternative explanation given for his name as the choice of title." According to the Chicago Tribune, "The filmmaker told a Toronto Film Festival crowd that movie titles shouldn’t have any bearing on the content, so he named his film Gummo after the fifth Marx Brother, who Korine claimed was a particularly well-endowed cross-dresser."

=== Casting ===
Korine cast the film almost entirely with local non-actors. Old friends were eager to help Korine, such as the two skinhead brothers, skateboarder Mark Gonzales, and dwarf Bryant L. Crenshaw. Professional actors include Sevigny, Linda Manz, and Max Perlich.

On Linda Manz, Korine stated, "I had always admired her. There was this sense about her that I liked – it wasn't even acting. It was like the way I felt about Buster Keaton when I first saw him. There was a kind of poetry about her, a glow. They both burnt off the screen." Gummo was her first screen appearance in 16 years.

Korine spotted his two main characters while watching cable television. Korine noticed Jacob Reynolds in a short role in The Road to Wellville (1994). "He was so visual... I never get tired of looking at his face." The character of Solomon, played by Reynolds, is described in Korine's script as looking "like no other kid in the world."

Nick Sutton, who plays Tummler, was spotted on a drug prevention episode of The Sally Jesse Raphael Show called "My Child Died From Sniffing Paint". In the show Sutton is asked where he thinks he will be in a few years, to which he responds, "I'll probably be dead." Recalls Korine, "I saw his face and I thought that was the boy I dreamed of, that was my Tummler. There was a beauty about him." Of Sutton, producer Scott Macaulay stated, "He's this person that Harmony sort of found and put in the middle of this movie, which is at times realistic and at times magical. I think of Nick as being Harmony's equivalent of Herzog's Bruno S."

Korine cast his actors not by how they read lines, but by the visual aura they put off.

=== Filming ===
The film was shot in some of Nashville's poorest neighborhoods. Producer Cary Woods comments, "we're essentially seeing the kind of poverty that we're used to seeing in Third World countries when news crews are covering famines, [but] seeing that in the heart of America." One small home housed fifteen people and several thousand cockroaches. Bugs literally crawled up and down the walls. Korine comments, "we had to take out stuff to be able to put the camera in the room." At times, the crew rebelled against filming in such conditions and Korine was forced to purchase hazmat suits for them to wear. Korine and Escoffier, who thought this was offensive and disrespectful to the residents of the houses, "wore Speedos and flip-flops just to piss them off."

Korine encouraged improvisation and spontaneity. To achieve this, Korine had to establish a mode of trust. "If an actor is a crack smoker, let him go out between takes, smoke crack, and then come back and throw his refrigerator out the window! Let people feel they can do whatever they want with no consequence." Producer Scott Macaulay commented the improvisational methods yielded deep results for everyone involved. "For a lot of the non-actors, you sensed that it was a very emotional experience for them, and that they were tapping into something important." Korine adds, "I wanted to show what it was like to sniff glue. I didn't want to judge anybody. This is why I have very little interest in working with actors. [Non-actors] can give you what an actor can never give you: pieces of themselves."

On the last day of shooting, Escoffier shot the chair-wrestling kitchen scene alone with a rigged boom on his camera. Some people had just gotten out of prison and Korine felt the performance would be greater if he wasn't in the room. The crew shut all the doors and turned off all the monitors, so no one knew what was going on. In between takes, Korine would run in and get everyone hyped up. At the end of the scene there is a moment of silence where no one knows what to do next. Korine comments, "When I saw that in the dailies, it amazed me, because Jean Yves really captured that awkwardness, that sad silence; it was beautiful."

Korine shot Gummo in just four weeks during the summer of 1996, most of the film being shot on the final week of production. This was due to the crew waiting for rain. The last scene shot is the one with Korine starring as a heavily intoxicated boy on a couch with a dwarf.

Any scenes appearing to show violence against animals were simulated, sometimes using prosthetic animals.

=== Editing ===
Korine worked with editor Christopher Tellefsen to synthesize the pre-planned footage with the "mistake-ist" footage:

"When we switched forms, when the film went to video, Hi-8, or Polaroids – I wanted everything to feel like it was done for a reason. Like they shot it on video because they couldn’t get it onto 35mm, or they shot it on Polaroids because that was the only camera that was there...There was a script, but as a screenwriter, I’m so bored with the idea of following a script. I felt like I had the movie in the script, so we shot the script but then shot everything else and made sense of it all in the editing process."

Korine said that he used footage from any source he could find that fit the aesthetic: "That cat tape was a tape that a friend of mine had given me, of him doing acid with his sister. They were in a garage band and there was a shot of their kitten. That [phasing] was an in-camera mistake." The final film is about 75% scripted.

== Music ==
Gummo's soundtrack paints a wide canvas of American pop-culture, ranging from Almeda Riddle's field recording of the traditional children's song "My Little Rooster", to the doom metal of the California band Sleep. Other popular songs include Buddy Holly's "Everyday" and Roy Orbison's "Crying", which closes the film and is directly referenced in the dialogue.

Extreme metal bands such as Bethlehem, Mystifier, Absu, Burzum, Bathory, Brujeria, Eyehategod and Spazz are also featured.

== Themes ==
The film explores a broad range of issues including drug abuse, violence, homicide, vandalism, mental illness, poverty, profanity, homophobia, sexual abuse, sexism, racism, suicide, grief, prostitution, and animal cruelty. Korine avoided any romantic notions regarding America, including its poor and mentally disabled.

Korine comments on the film's pop-aesthetic, saying: "America is all about this recycling, this interpretation of pop. I want you to see these kids wearing Bone Thugs & Harmony t-shirts and Metallica hats – this almost schizophrenic identification with popular imagery. If you think about, that's how people relate to each other these days, through these images." Dot and Helen are modeled after Cherie Currie. "I wanted them to seem like homeschool kids... sort of guessing and coming up with these hipster things. They almost make a homeschool hip language. I wanted this inbred vernacular."

The film has a strong vaudevillian influence. The name of the character Tummler is taken directly from the vaudevillian term given to lower-level comics of the day. "The guys that would check you into a hotel room, take your coat, and at the same time throw a few one-liners out. They're like the warm-up, the lowest level comedian. The tummler." (See Borscht Belt.)

Producer Robin O'Hara argues that while people naturally look for points of reference to describe Gummo (such as Herzog, Cassavetes, Arbus, Fellini, Godard, Maysles and Jarman) that Korine's art really is his own. "He is an original, in every sense of the word." Korine comments on the film's aesthetic: "We tried very hard not to reference other films. We wanted Gummo to set its own standard."

== Release ==
Gummo premiered at the 24th Telluride Film Festival on August 29, 1997. During the screening, several people walked out the theater during the opening sequence when the cat is drowned by one of the protagonists. Several festival appearances followed including International Film Festival Rotterdam where it won the KNF Award for "best feature film in the official section that does not yet have distribution within the Netherlands," and Venice Film Festival where it received a special mention from the FIPRESCI jury. It was picked up for distribution by Fine Line Features, and saw a limited release with an R rating (edited from the original NC-17 version) in the United States on October 17, 1997 for pervasive depiction of anti-social behavior of juveniles, including violence, substance abuse, sexuality and language.

=== Critical reception ===
Gummo received generally mixed to negative reviews upon its initial release, with a 39% approval rating on Rotten Tomatoes based on 61 reviews, and an average rating of 6.0/10. The site's critical consensus states "Gummo's bold provocations may impress more iconoclastically inclined viewers, but others will find it hard to see past writer-director Harmony Korine's overwhelmingly sour storytelling perspective." On Metacritic, the film has a weighted average score of 19 out of 100 based on reviews from 15 critics, indicating "overwhelming dislike."

Werner Herzog praised the film and talked about being impressed by the bacon taped to the wall during the bathtub scene.

Janet Maslin of The New York Times called Gummo "the worst film of the year." Director Lukas Moodysson, by contrast, listed it as one of his top ten films for the 2002 Sight and Sound Poll and Australian director Megan Spencer also praised the film. David Stratton of SBS's The Movie Show stated in his review that "cat lovers should be warned", but ultimately praised the film, calling it "original".

Filmmaker Gus Van Sant on Gummo writes, "Venomous in story; genius in character; victorious in structure; teasingly gentle in epilogue; slapstick in theme; rebellious in nature; honest at heart; inspirational in its creation and with contempt at the tip of its tongue, [Gummo] is a portrait of small-town Middle American life that is both bracingly realistic and hauntingly dreamlike."

A short excerpt from Gummo was shown after the opening sequence in the 1998 film Belly.

=== Home media ===
Gummo was released on VHS following its theatrical release and on DVD in 2001. As of 2024, it was unavailable on any streaming service or for digital purchase. It was released on Blu-ray and Ultra HD Blu-ray on October 22, 2024 by The Criterion Collection.

== The Diary of Anne Frank Pt. II ==
Screenshot from the collage

The Diary of Anne Frank Pt. II is a 40-minute three-screen collage featuring the same actors and themes as Gummo, and can be considered a companion piece.

Korine comments, "I could probably make another two movies with the excess footage [from Gummo]. Some of this material I'm going to use in this art work... the problem you run into doing multimedia projection is that a lot of the time, the style takes over. It threatens and reduces the content. It becomes almost like a music video – mixing all these forms for no reason."
