= Teenage Cocktail =

- Film festival poster
- Directed by: John Carchietta
- Written by: John Carchietta
- Produced by: Travis Stevens
- Starring: Nichole Sakura; Fabianne Therese; Michelle Borth; Pat Healy; A. J. Bowen; Joshua Leonard
- Cinematography: Justin Kane
- Edited by: Ben La Marca; L. Gustavo Cooper
- Music by: Mads Heldtberg; Steve Damstra II
- Production companies: BackUp Media; Snowfort Pictures
- Distributed by: Netflix
- Release dates: March 12, 2016 (SXSW); January 15, 2017 (United States)
- Running time: 88 minutes
- Country: United States
- Language: English

Teenage Cocktail is a 2016 American romance film and thriller film written and directed by John Carchietta and starring Nichole Sakura, Fabianne Therese, Michelle Borth, Pat Healy, A. J. Bowen and Joshua Leonard. The film had its world premiere at South by Southwest on March 12, 2016.

== Premise ==
Two high school students Annie (Nichole Sakura) and Jules (Fabianne Therese), feeling confined by their small town and parents, fall in love with each other and plan to run away and try webcam modelling to make enough money to survive. At first the money comes rolling in, but the girls quickly learn that the consequences of their actions can blindside them.

== Cast ==
- Nichole Sakura as Annie Fenton
- Fabianne Therese as Jules Rae
- Michelle Borth as Lynn Fenton
- Pat Healy as Frank
- A. J. Bowen as Joseph Damone
- Joshua Leonard as Tom Fenton
- Zak Henri as Scott
- Lou Wegner as Alex
- River Alexander as Nick Fenton
- Laura Corelli as Maria
- Issac Salzman as Eddie

== Production ==
Nichole Sakura and Fabianne Therese did not audition for their roles in the film, instead they had meetings to discuss the script and characters with Carchietta who does not trust the cold read process of traditional casting calls.

== Marketing ==
In March 2016, the first teaser and poster for the film were released on IndieWire and Entertainment Weekly, respectively.

== Release ==
The film had its world premiere at South by Southwest on March 12, 2016. Shortly thereafter, Netflix acquired distribution rights to the film and set it for a January 15, 2017, release.
