= Joseph-Marie Lo Duca =

Italian film historian (1905–2004)

Joseph-Marie Lo Duca (French: [lo dyka]; 18 November 1905 or 1910 – 6 August 2004) was an Italian-born journalist, novelist, art critic, and film historian best known as the co-founder in 1951 of the influential French magazine Cahiers du Cinéma with André Bazin, Jacques Doniol-Valcroze, and Léonide Keigel.

== Biography ==
He was born Giuseppe Lo Duca in Milan, Italy in 1905 or 1910 to a family of Sicilian origin. Engaged from an early age in reading and writing, he published his first novel La sfera di platino ("The Sphere of Platinum") in 1927. His later work, translated and published in France, won the appreciation of André Breton, Paul Valéry, Marcel Griaule, and Jean Cocteau.

To avoid arrest after a feud with sculptor Arturo Martini, Lo Duca emigrated to Paris in 1935 where he was eventually appointed director of the Centre international de documentation photographique et cinématographique de Paris (International Centre of Photographic and Cinematographic Documentation of Paris). With Paul Valéry, he co-wrote Conversation sur l’histoire along with monographs on painters including Henri Rousseau and Giorgio de Chirico.

In 1942, having assembled a wealth of rare documents and objects related to cinema, Lo Duca established the Musée Canudo at the Palais de Chaillot in Paris with the goal of subsequently founding an International Museum of Cinema in Rome. The project for the Rome museum, however, did not survive the war.

In 1948, he published Le dessin animé (The Animated Cartoon) with a preface by Walt Disney. His Histoire du cinéma (1942) was translated into twelve languages, while his Technique du cinéma (1948) became a noted reference work.

Lo Duca's novel Journal secret de Napoléon Bonaparte (The Secret Diary of Napoleon Bonaparte), published in 1948 with a preface by Jean Cocteau, received enthusiastic reviews from Georges Bataille, Jacques Audiberti, Joseph Delteil, Marcel Pagnol, Jean Dutourd, and Jacques Chastenet. André Breton claimed the author had invented a new literary genre, "history-fiction". Acknowledged as his greatest success, the novel was re-published in France in 1980 and 1997.

In 1951, he co-founded the influential Cahiers du Cinéma and remained on its editorial board until 1955.

Between 1958 and 1967, Lo Duca co-edited the Bibliothèque internationale d'érotologie (International Library of Erotology) published by Jean-Jacques Pauvert.

A specialist in erotic art, his works include Eros im Bild (1942) with a preface by Georges Bataille, L'erotismo nel cinema (1945), Storia dell'erotismo (1968), Dizionario di sessuologia (1972), Manuel des confesseurs (1982), and Luxure de luxe: arte erotica nei fumetti da Botticelli a Lichtenstein, (1983).

In 1951, Lo Duca found a copy of the negative of Carl Theodor Dreyer's second version of The Passion of Joan of Arc in the Gaumont Studios vaults, to which he then made several changes, including the addition of a baroque musical score and the replacing of intertitles with subtitles. For many years, Lo Duca's version was the only one available. Dreyer objected to Lo Duca's cut.

In 1960, he edited the novelized French version of Federico Fellini's La Dolce Vita. In 1974, he wrote the preface to the French edition of the screenplay of Amarcord written by Fellini and Tonino Guerra.

Interviewed by Radio France in 1999 about his long career, he highlighted his defense of the freedom of artistic expression under French censorship during the 1960s.

In 1990, when over 90 years old, he published Les mines de Sodome (2001), a trilogy of sexually explicit short stories.

In 2004, he granted his last interview to Canadian filmmaker Damian Pettigrew and talked about the creative relationship between Fellini and his wife Giulietta Masina, as well as Italian writer Mario Tobino's influence on the screenplay of La Dolce Vita.

In 1998, he moved from the Paris suburb of Nanterre to Samois-sur-Seine near Fontainbleau where he died in 2004. The municipal library was renamed La Bibliothèque Lo Duca in his honour.

== Selected works ==
- La Sphère de platine (1927)
- Histoire du cinéma (1942)
- La Technique du cinéma (1948)
- Le Journal Secret de Napoléon Bonaparte (1948)
- L’Histoire de l’Erotisme (1961) – A History of Eroticism (trans. Kenneth Anger, 1966)
- Erotique de l'Art (1966)
- Dictionnaire de sexologie (1972)
- Et si nous parlions des crétins ? (1973)
- Les Mines de Sodome (2001)
