= Lili Hinstin =

French film producer and artistic director (1977–2026)

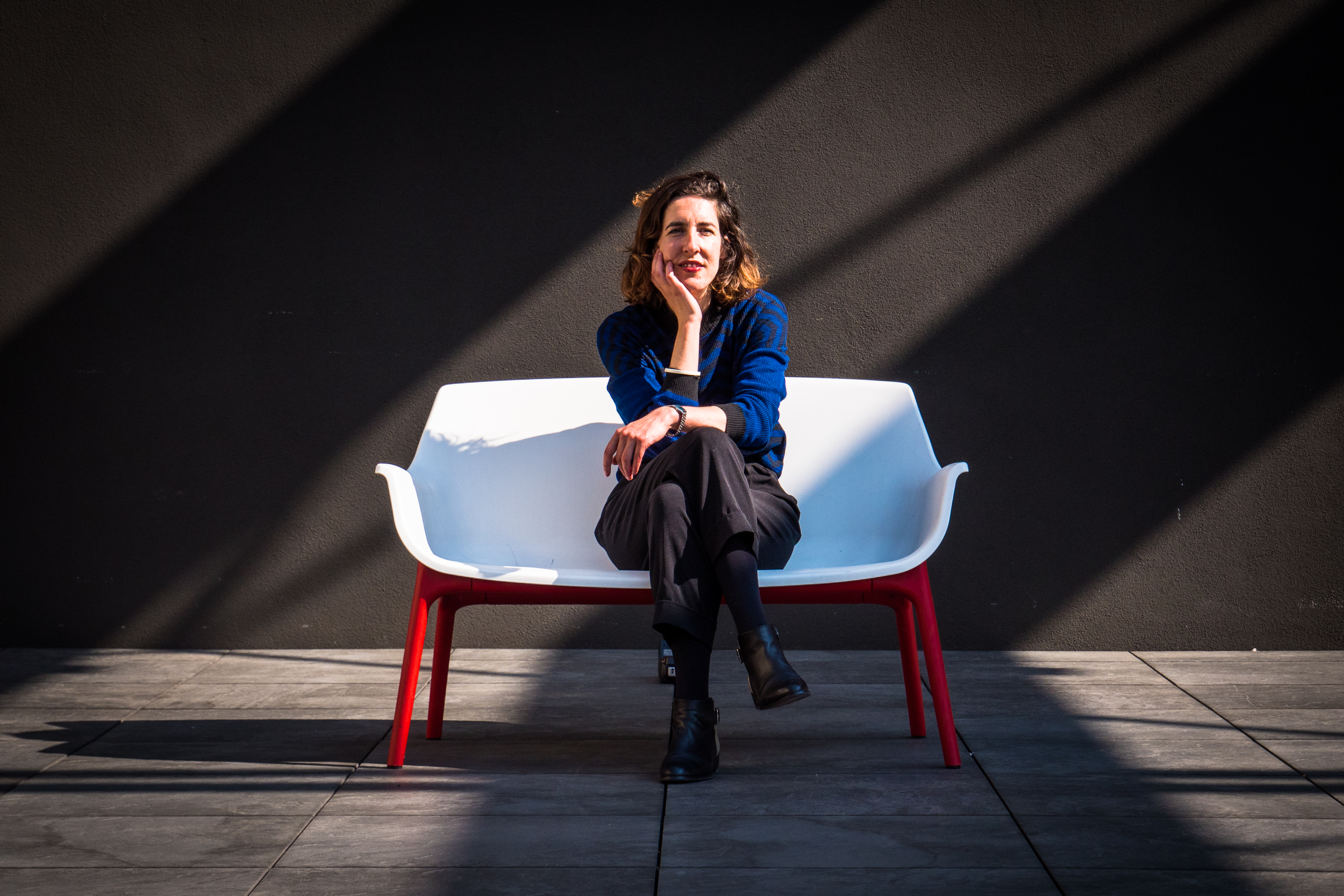
- Born: 10 July 1977; Paris, France
- Died: 31 March 2026 (aged 48)
- Occupation: Artistic director
- Organization(s): Villa Medici; Locarno Festival; Entrevues Belfort film festival

Lili Hinstin (10 July 1977 – 31 March 2026) was a French artistic director.

Hinstin was artistic director of the EntreVues Belfort International Festival (2013–18) and Locarno Film Festival (2018–20). From 2023, she was the programming director of the Festival International du Film de Biarritz — Nouvelles Vagues.

== Life and career ==
Hinstin was born in France on 10 July 1977. She studied at the universities of Paris and Padua.

In 2021, Hinstin founded the production company Les Films du Saut du Tigre. From 2005 to 2009 she was a programmer for the French Academy in Rome – Villa Médicis, she was deputy artistic director for Cinéma du réel International Festival at Centre Pompidou from 2010 to 2013.

From 2013 to 2018 she was the artistic director of Entrevues Belfort International Film Festival.

From December 2018 to September 2020, she was the artistic director of the Locarno Film Festival. Under Hinstin, the festival shifted its course to a more eclectic line-up in aim to provide more equal representation of movies and directors, disregarding their genders and provenance. Almost 40% of the selected features for the 2019th edition were directed by female filmmakers. Citing significant differences and diverging strategic views with the event's top management, she stepped down in September 2020.

In 2019, she was one of the two French women with Sidonie Dumas included in the third edition of Variety500, an index of the 500 most influential business leaders shaping the global media industry.

As of 2023, she was a member of the Organisation and Selection Committees of Villa Medici Film Festival in Rome Italy, which first edition was held in September 2021; as well as the Programming Director of the Nouvelles Vagues film festival.

Hinstin died on 31 March 2026, at the age of 48.
