= Jacques Rivette, le veilleur =

- Written by: Claire Denis; Serge Daney
- Directed by: Claire Denis; Serge Daney
- Starring: Jacques Rivette
- Country of origin: France
- Original language: French

Production
- Producers: Janine Bazin; André S. Labarthe
- Cinematography: Agnès Godard; Béatrice Mizrahi
- Editor: Dominique Auvray
- Running time: 125 minutes

Original release
- Release: 1990

Jacques Rivette, le veilleur (English: Jacques Rivette, the nightwatchman) is a 1990 French television documentary film directed by Claire Denis and Serge Daney. Chronicling the life of film critic and director Jacques Rivette, it is an episode of the long-running French TV show Cinéma, de notre temps, which profiles the lives of film directors. It was directed by Denis, with Daney acting as the interviewer. It was made in 1990 and first broadcast on Arte on 24 February 1994. It comprises two parts: Le Jour (70 minutes) and La Nuit (54 minutes).

== Participants ==
- Jacques Rivette
- Serge Daney
- Bulle Ogier
- Jean Babilée
- Jean-François Stévenin

== Reception ==
Travis Mackenzie Hoover wrote that the documentary portrays Rivette with "lonerish tendencies" and as "a sort of transient with no home or country, wandering about or loitering in public space instead of staking out some personal terra firma."
