= Serge Daney =

French movie critic (1944–1992)

Serge Daney (French pronunciation: [sɛʁʒ danɛ]; June 4, 1944, Paris – June 12, 1992) was a French movie critic. He was a major figure of Cahiers du cinéma, which he co-edited in the late 1970s. He also wrote extensively about films, television, and society in the newspaper Libération and founded the quarterly review Trafic shortly before his death. Highly regarded in French and European film criticism circles, his work remained little known to English-speaking audiences until recent translations. A first book-long interview, Postcards from the Cinema, was published in 2007, two collections of his writings prior to 1982, The Cinema House and the World, in 2022, and Footlights, in 2023.

== Biography ==
At the Lycée Voltaire in Paris, Daney received his first film teachings from Henri Agel, one of the most respected critics of the time. With two high school friends, Louis Skorecki and Claude Dépêche, he founded a short-lived film magazine called Visages du cinéma which only saw two editions, on Howard Hawks (containing Daney's first published text - a review of Rio Bravo called "An Adult Art") and on Otto Preminger.

In 1964, Daney joined the French film magazine Cahiers du cinéma with a series of interviews of American film directors (notably Howard Hawks, Leo McCarey, Josef von Sternberg and Jerry Lewis) conducted with Jean Louis Noames (aka Louis Skorecki) during a trip to Hollywood. He writes regularly for the magazine which was moving on from its "yellow cover” beginnings (the time of André Bazin, François Truffaut, Jean-Luc Godard, Éric Rohmer and Jacques Rivette - roughly 1951-1959) and was about to enter a period of heavy theoretical debates and radical political engagement after 1968.

Between 1968 and 1971, Daney also makes a series of travels to India, Morocco and Africa and starts lecturing cinema at the Censier University (Paris III). After Cahiers’ failure to create a “Revolutionary Cultural Front”, Daney took the responsibility of the magazine in 1973, supported by Serge Toubiana. Together, they operated a "return to cinema" for the magazine and also invited thinkers from outside the field of cinema: Michel Foucault, Jacques Rancière and Gilles Deleuze. He had frequent exchanges with Félix Guattari, Roland Barthes, and Claire Denis as well.

In 1981, Daney left Cahiers for the French daily newspaper Libération, to which he had contributed occasionally since its creation in 1973. Writing first about cinema, his focus turns more and more towards television. In 1987, for a hundred days, he wrote daily about French television in a column called “The wage of the channel hopper”. From 1988 to 1991, he wrote a column on how films look when they are shown on television. He also wrote small pamphlets increasingly critical of television programs before he abandoned writing about television altogether in 1991, after a critical analysis of the television coverage of the Gulf War.

Daney went on to found the quarterly film magazine Trafic in which he wrote four pieces before dying of AIDS in June 1992.

Daney had other passions such as tennis and bullfights.

== Bibliography ==
Daney published four books during his lifetime which are collections of his articles:

- La Rampe (Gallimard/Cahiers du cinéma, 1983) - translated in English as Footlights (Semiotexte(e), MIT Press, 2023).
- Ciné-journal (Cahiers du cinéma, 1986)
- Le Salaire du zappeur (P.O.L., 1988)
- Devant la recrudescence des vols des sacs à main (Aléas, 1991)

He also published a little-known book called "Procès à Baby Doc, Duvalier père et fils", a 1973 polemic against the Duvalier regime in Haiti written under the pseudonym Raymond Sapène.

In the years after his death, several other books have been released:

- L'exercice a été profitable, Monsieur (P.O.L, 1993), a collection of the notes he took while watching French television in the early 1990s.
- Persévérance (P.O.L, 1994), Daney's last project for a complete book for which he wrote the first chapter - the rest being the transcript of an interview with Serge Toubiana. It has been translated in English as Postcards from the Cinema (Berg, 2007).
- L'amateur de tennis (P.O.L, 1994), a selection of articles he wrote in Liberation about tennis matches.
- L’itinéraire d'un ciné-fils (Editions Jean-Michel Place, 1999), the transcript of the eponymous TV documentary.

Daney's complete writings (i.e. those not in the books above) have been published in French by P.O.L:

- La maison cinéma et le monde 1: Le temps des Cahiers (1962-1981). An English translation was published in 2022 as The Cinema House and the World (Semiotext(e), MIT Press, 2022).
- La maison cinéma et le monde 2: Les années Libé 1 (1981-1985)
- La maison cinéma et le monde 3: Les années Libé 2 (1986-1991)
- La maison cinéma et le monde 4: Le moment Trafic (1991-1992)

== Filmography ==
Serge Daney participated in several documentaries:

Lettre de Paris à l'ami suisse no 7 (1987), 30min, directed by Maria Koleva
Jacques Rivette, le veilleur (1990), 2h20, directed by Serge Daney and Claire Denis
Damned! Daney (1991), 55 min, directed by Bernard Mantelli
Océanique: Serge Daney - itinéraires d'un ciné-fils (1992), 3 parts of 63min, 60min and 64 min, directed by Pierre-Andre Boutang and Dominique Rabourding
Daney-Sanbar, Conversation Nord-Sud (1993), 46min, directed by Simone Bitton and Catherine Poitevin
Serge Daney, Le Cinephile et le village (1993), 55min, directed by Pascal Kané
Du cinéma à la télévision, propos d'un passeur, Serge Daney (1993), 55min, directed by Philippe Roger
Télé(s)-Flux: le gué Daney (1994), 44min, Directed by Bernard Mantelli

He made one film La preuve par prince, probably in the late 1980s, shown on Télé Soleil, a defunct local cable television channel, a montage of images he watched on French television during one day, with his commentary.

== Radio ==
Serge Daney hosted a weekly broadcast on French radio station France-Culture called Microfilms from the last quarter of 1985 to July 1990. Daney invited a guest speaker (a film maker, a film shoot photographer, an actor) to talk about a film, a particular subject, or to sum up the events of a film season or a festival.

Media offices
Preceded by Jean Narboni	Editor of Cahiers du cinéma 1973–1981; With: Serge Toubiana	Succeeded by Serge Toubiana
