= François Truffaut: Stolen Portraits =

1993 film

- Directed by: Michel Pascal; Serge Toubiana
- Produced by: Bertrand Van Effenterre
- Release date: 14 May 1993
- Running time: 88 minutes
- Country: France
- Language: French

François Truffaut: Stolen Portraits (French: François Truffaut: Portraits volés) is a 1993 French documentary film directed by Michel Pascal and Serge Toubiana, about the film director François Truffaut. It was screened in the Un Certain Regard section at the 1993 Cannes Film Festival.

== Cast ==
- Fanny Ardant as herself
- Olivier Assayas as himself
- Alexandre Astruc as himself
- Jean Aurel as himself
- Nathalie Baye as herself
- Janine Bazin as herself
- Marcel Berbert as himself
- Claude Chabrol as himself
- Yann Dedet as himself
- Catherine Deneuve
- Gérard Depardieu as himself
- Albert Duchenne as himself
- Claude de Givray as himself
- Jean Gruault as himself
- Annette Insdorf as herself
- Claude Jade as herself
- Robert Lachenay as himself
- Jean-Pierre Léaud
- Monique Lucas as herself
- Claude Miller as himself
- Jeanne Moreau
- Madeleine Morgenstern as herself
- Marcel Ophüls as himself
- Marie-France Pisier as herself
- Jean-Louis Richard as himself
- Eric Rohmer as himself
- Henri Serre
- Liliane Siegel as herself
- Bertrand Tavernier as himself
- Eva Truffaut as herself
- Laura Truffaut as herself
- Oskar Werner (archive footage)

== Reception ==
Stanley Kauffmann at The New Republic wrote 'In human and in film-historical terms, this Toubiana-Pascal documentary is a treasure. It ought to be shown wherever there's a Truffaut audience, and it ought to be made available on tape.' Todd McCarthy of the Variety Magazine said that:

Film critics Serge Toubiana and Michel Pascal have made a revealing but far from definitive docu study of the life and career of the late French director Francois Truffaut. Interviews with an impressive lineup of friends, associates and family members peel away layers of the onion to unveil aspects of the subject's personality that were largely undiscussed during his lifetime.
