= 1996 riots in St. Petersburg, Florida =

St. Petersburg, Florida riots of 1996
- Date: First Wave: October 25, 1996 – October 26, 1996 Second Wave: November 13, 1996 – November 14, 1996
- Location: St. Petersburg, Florida, United States
- Caused by: First Wave: Shooting of Tyron Lewis; Second Wave: Jim Knight not indicted
- Methods: Arson, looting, rioting, gunfire
- Status: Ended

Casualties
- Injuries: 11+
- Arrested: 20+

Riots occurred in St. Petersburg, Florida, in 1996 following the shooting and death of an unarmed African American male teenage motorist during a police traffic stop.

== Initial incident ==
Two police officers, Jim Knight and Sandra Minor, saw the gold sports car speeding on 18th Avenue S, on October 24, 1996. Knight, who was driving, flipped on the police car's emergency lights and stopped the car near the intersection at 16th Street.

In court documents, Knight says he told the driver, 18-year-old Tyron Lewis, to turn off the car's engine and show his hands. Instead, Knight says, Lewis bumped him at least six times with the car. Witnesses would later say Lewis' car rolled at the speed of a baby's crawl. Lewis' passenger, Eugene Young, who was not shot, recalled Lewis saying: "Please don't shoot, please don't shoot, I ain't even got nothing!" Knight told his partner to smash the car's windows with her baton. As she did, Knight says Lewis attempted to turn the car. Knight was knocked onto the gold hood. He fired his Glock semiautomatic pistol three times, hitting Lewis twice in the arm and once in the chest. He died at the scene.

== Riots ==
During the investigation immediately following this event, a large crowd had gathered and became agitated due to the police department not sharing information and a number of witnesses describing events. The situation quickly got out of hand and the crowd began throwing rocks, bottles, and other items at police officers.

Police officers received reinforcements from other local agencies and off-duty St. Petersburg Police officers. As officers and Sheriff deputies shot tear gas into the crowd and dispersed the initial crowd at 16th Street and 18th Avenue South, a number of individuals continued rioting through the area of St. Petersburg known as Midtown.

At least 20 people were arrested and 28 arson fires were confirmed as groups of youths ran back and forth throughout the night, throwing rocks, bricks and bottles at officers in riot gear, businesses and passing cars. At least 11 people were injured, including a police officer who was shot and a newspaper photographer who was beaten, as hundreds of people swarmed through the streets after the shooting on October 24. Stores were looted and thick smoke clouded the neighborhood just south of downtown. In total, the rioters were responsible for an approximate $5 million in property damage.

=== Different media versions ===
Media outlets published different versions of the initial incident. The media outlets in and around the St. Petersburg area included the information that the car Lewis was driving was suspected of being stolen. Media outlets outside the area only mentioned that Lewis was pulled over for speeding. The car was actually reported stolen but, after further investigation, was found to have been sold to Lewis for an undetermined amount of crack cocaine, then reported stolen by the seller.

== Aftermath ==
After the rioting, Knight and his partner Sandra Minor were put on paid leave while investigation into their actions took place. Within a few weeks, the two officers were cleared of all charges by a grand jury, igniting further rioting on November 13 and 14. The Grand Jury had decided that Knight shooting Lewis was reasonable and it was not racially motivated, and this led to further riots. Not even a few hours after the Grand Jury's ruling, the riots worsened and over 30 fires were started, two police officers and two firefighters were injured (one of them a police helicopter pilot who was hit by gunfire), and dozens were arrested.

=== Gymnasium naming ===
The People's Democratic Uhuru Movement has a gym named "Uhuru Black Gym of Our Own." In 2006, city leaders moved the gym to an abandoned building on 9th St. S., renovated the building and renamed it to "All People's TyRon Lewis Community Gym." This move sparked controversy with many police officers.

== In popular culture ==
In 2006, Chris Fuller's film Loren Cass was released in the United States depicting the riots.

== See also ==
- List of incidents of civil unrest in the United States
