= The Aggression Scale =

- Directed by: Steven C. Miller
- Screenplay by: Ben Powell
- Produced by: Travis Stevens; Shaked Berenson; Patrick Ewald
- Starring: Fabianne Therese; Ryan Hartwig; Dana Ashbrook; Derek Mears; Jacob Reynolds; Joseph McKelheera; Boyd Kestner; Lisa Rotondi; Ray Wise
- Cinematography: Jeff Dolen
- Edited by: Steven C. Miller
- Music by: Kevin Riepl
- Production companies: Snowfort Pictures; Epic Pictures Group
- Distributed by: Anchor Bay Films
- Release date: May 29, 2012
- Running time: 91 minutes
- Countries: United States; Canada
- Language: English

The Aggression Scale is a 2012 action thriller film directed by Steven C. Miller. It stars Ray Wise, Dana Ashbrook, Derek Mears, Fabianne Therese, Ryan Hartwig, and Jacob Reynolds.

== Plot ==
Mob boss Bellavance (Ray Wise) is released from prison on bail, and discovers that $500,000 of his money is missing. With only two days to flee to a non-extradition country, he instructs four of his henchmen, led by Lloyd (Dana Ashbrook), to retrieve the money and send a “loud and messy” message to the thieves’ families.

The last house they visit is a rural property belonging to Bill Rutledge (Boyd Kestner), who has just relocated with his emotionally disturbed young son Owen (Ryan Hartwig), his new wife Maggie (Lisa Rotondi) and her daughter Lauren (Fabianne Therese). Breaking in, the men execute Maggie and torture Bill for the location of the money, whilst another, Chissom chases Lauren. She is rescued by Owen however, who uses a baseball bat and box cutter blades to injure the man, allowing the two to escape. Owen attempts to rescue his father, but despite injuring another hitman is forced to flee into the woods with Lauren whilst Lloyd kills Bill.

Inside the house, Lloyd and Freddie (Jacob Reynolds) uncover medical paperwork showing that Owen was institutionalised due to violent behaviour after permanently disabling three highschool bullies, scoring almost full marks on the aggression scale. His father was only able to get him discharged by using the money stolen from Bellavance. Chissom and Wydofski (Joseph McKelheer) follow the children into the woods, but the former is further injured by a booby trap set by Owen, whilst the latter is stabbed to death by Lauren when he gains the upper hand against her stepbrother.

Under cover of darkness, Owen and Lauren break into a local used car dealership to obtain transport, however they are ambushed by the three remaining men. Freddie is killed when Owen stabs him in the skull with Wydofski’s hunting knife. Lloyd shoots Owen and takes Lauren back to the house, believing she can tell him where the money is located. However, Owen survives when the bullet deflects off a stolen hub cap he placed in his jacket earlier. A badly injured Chissom returns from the woods, and is shot by Lloyd for his incompetence. Following Lloyd and Lauren back to the house, Owen uses ammonia and bleach to create a chloramine gas trap that incapacitates Lloyd in the basement, before killing him by throwing a dresser down the stairs onto his head.

The next morning, Owen and Lauren arrive at Bellavance's hideout as he prepares to leave the country. He opens an envelope that contains Polaroids of his dead men, and then looks up to see the two driving the family rental van right towards him.

== Cast ==
- Ray Wise as Bellavance, a recently bailed mob boss.
- Dana Ashbrook as Lloyd, the leader of the hitmen.
- Derek Mears as Chissom, a hitman working for Bellavance.
- Boyd Kestner as Bill Rutledge, a former associate of Bellavance and Owen's father.
- Ryan Hartwig as Owen Rutledge, Bill's emotionally disturbed teenage son and Laurens step-brother.
- Lisa Rotondi as Maggie Rutledge, Bill's new wife and the mother of Lauren.
- Fabianne Therese as Lauren Rutledge, Maggie's daughter and Owen's step-sister.
- Jacob Reynolds as Freddie, a hitman working for Bellavance.
- Joseph McKelheer as Wydofski, a hitman working for Bellavance.

== Releases ==
The film premiered at South By Southwest where it was bought and distributed by Anchor Bay. It released on DVD and Blu-ray on May 29, 2012.

== See also ==
- Home Alone—a film franchise with a similar premise
- List of films featuring home invasions
