= Jacques Doniol-Valcroze =

French actor (1920–1989)

- Born: 15 March 1920; Paris, France
- Died: 6 October 1989 (aged 69); Cannes, France
- Occupations: Film critic, Film director, screenwriter, actor

Jacques Doniol-Valcroze (French: [ʒak dɔnjɔl valkʁoz]; 15 March 1920 – 6 October 1989) was a French actor, critic, screenwriter, and director. In 1951, Doniol-Valcroze was a co-founder of the renowned film magazine Cahiers du cinéma, along with André Bazin and Joseph-Marie Lo Duca. The magazine was initially edited by Doniol-Valcroze between 1951–1957. As critic, he championed numerous filmmakers including Orson Welles, Howard Hawks, and Nicholas Ray. In 1955, then 23-year-old François Truffaut made a short film in Doniol-Valcroze's apartment, Une Visite. Jacques's daughter Florence played a minor part in it.

In 1955, he was a member of the jury at the 16th Venice International Film Festival, and in 1964 a member of the jury at the 14th Berlin International Film Festival.

== New Wave ==
In his thirties he played a pivotal role in the French New Wave, discussing the beginnings of "the new cinema" as the co-founder of Cahiers du cinéma and defended Alain Robbe-Grillet. Jean Douchet wrote that no one had a better New Wave profile, but his work "was overshadowed by the immediate influence of the second generation" of New Wave directors: "His first feature film, l'Eau à la bouche (1960), arrived too late. Not strong enough to surprise, the film earned him only 'sympathetic' reviews. From then on ... criticism displayed a certain distance from the man. Wrongly, it seems."

In 1963 he appeared in L'Immortelle, an international co-produced drama art film directed by Alain Robbe-Grillet.

His own works in this area include directing the film L'Eau à la bouche and acting in some New Wave films, including Chantal Akerman's cult classic Jeanne Dielman, 23 quai du Commerce, 1080 Bruxelles. Additionally he was friends with François Truffaut who shot his first film Une Visite in his apartment. He was married to Françoise Brion.

The Director’s Fortnight, founded in 1968 during the nationwide strikes which closed down the Cannes Film Festival that year, was the brainchild of Jacques Doniol-Valcroze. The event was sponsored by his fledgling Société des Réalisateurs de Films (Film Directors Society) with the intention of "...opening up the Cannes Festival to little-known filmmakers and national cinemas, without concern for budgets or shooting formats."

He died of a ruptured aneurysm in 1989.

== Filmography ==
Year	Title	Role	Notes
1950	Orphée	young man at Café des Poètes	uncredited
1956	Le Coup du berger	Jean	short; credited as Étienne Loinod
1957	Les Surmenés	director	short
1960	L'Eau à la bouche	director	
1960	Le bel âge	Jacques	
1962	And Satan Calls the Turns	Éric	
1963	L'Immortelle	N, the Man	
1963	Portuguese Vacation	Jacques	
1963	Los felices sesenta	Víctor	
1968	Je t'aime, je t'aime	the editor	
1970	Le Voyou	the banker	
1971	L'amour c'est gai, l'amour c'est triste	first client	
1971	Out 1	Etienne	
1973	Elle court, elle court la banlieue	first dentist	
1973	A Full Day's Work	the juror Jacquemont, the actor playing Hamlet	
1975	Playing with Fire	commissaire Laurent	
1975	Jeanne Dielman, 23 quai du Commerce, 1080 Bruxelles	2nd caller	
1977	The Apprentice Heel	Deputy Mayor Forelon	
1977	Goodbye Emmanuelle	Michel Cordier	
1978	En l'autre bord		
1979	Memoirs of a French Whore		
1980	Le soleil en face	a guest on the TV debate	
1980	Je vais craquer!!!	Maxence, literary critic	
1984	Le Bon Plaisir	lawyer	

== Director ==
Movies

- 1957: L'Œil du maître (short film)
- 1958: Les Surmenés (short film)
- 1958: Bonjour, Monsieur La Bruyère (short film)
- 1959: L'Eau à la bouche (A Game for Six Lovers
- 1960: Le Cœur battant (The French Game (film))
- 1961: La Dénonciation
- 1962: P.X.O. (short film) with Pierre Kast
- 1965: Jean-Luc Godard (short film)
- 1967: Le Viol (The Immoral Moment)
- 1970: La Maison des Bories (The House of the Bories)
- 1971: L'Homme au cerveau greffé
- 1977: Une femme fatale

TV films and series

- 1964: L'Enlèvement d'Antoine Bigut (film)
- 1967: La Bien-aimée (film)
- 1979: Le Tourbillon des jours (TV series, 6 episodes, 52 min.)
- 1981: Les Fiancées de l'Empire (TV series, 6 episodes)
- 1982: Lorelei (film)
- 1982: Venise en hiver (film)
- 1984: Un seul être vous manque (TV series, 8 episodes, 52 min.)
- 1988: Nick, chasseur de têtes (film)
- 1989: Nick, chasseur de têtes (TV series)

1989: La Vie en couleurs (film)

== Novels ==
- Les portes du baptistère, 1955, Editions Denoël
- Les fiancées de l'Empire, vol. 1: Les hauteurs de Wagram, 1980, Editions JC Lattès
- Les fiancées de l'Empire, vol. 2: La route d'Espagne, 1981, Editions JC Lattès

== See also ==
- A Short History of 'Cahiers du Cinéma' by Emilie Bickerton
