= The Trivial Pursuits of Arthur Banks =

- Genre: Comedy
- Created by: Peter Glanz
- Written by: Peter Glanz and Juan Iglesias
- Directed by: Peter Glanz
- Country of origin: United States
- Original language: English
- No. of seasons: 1
- No. of episodes: 3

Production
- Executive producers: Peter Glanz, Neda Armian and Juan Iglesias
- Camera setup: single-camera
- Running time: 40 minutes (total)

Original release
- Network: AMC
- Release: August 22 – September 5, 2011

The Trivial Pursuits of Arthur Banks is an American web series from AMC. It premiered in three sub-15 minute episodes on August 22, 2011. The series marked the first production for AMC's Digital Studios, which co-released the program through Hulu. It starred Adam Goldberg as the title character and Jeffrey Tambor as his psychiatrist.

== Premise ==
Early in each episode, Arthur sits in a session with his therapist, rehashing his latest sexual encounter. Arthur is a successful playwright who is working to stage an elaborate play that mirrors his dysfunctional love life. Arthur has run-ins with barely legal teens, overemotional actors and surprise escorts. Aided by his therapist, and friend, Chandler Brown (Pete Chekvala), he attempts to navigate through this complex love life (and, accordingly, his on-stage meta-life).

Some scenes reference the film Deconstructing Harry.

== Cast ==
- Adam Goldberg as Arthur Banks
- Jeffrey Tambor as The Therapist
- Larry Pine as The Narrator
- Pete Chekvala as Chandler Brown
- Wendy Glenn as Annette
- Laura Clery as Cornelia Klein
- Fabianne Therese as Chloe
- Camille Cregan as The Understudy
- Barry Primus as George Epstein
- Liesl Gaffney Dawson as Sophie

== Episodes ==
- Episode One: I Pulled A Polanski
- Episode Two: The Silent Treatment
- Episode Three: The Latent Existentialist
