= A Short History of 'Cahiers du Cinéma' =

2009 nonfiction book by Emilie Bickerton

A Short History of 'Cahiers du Cinéma
- 2009 Book jacket
- Author: Emilie Bickerton
- Language: English
- Subject: The history of 'Cahiers du Cinéma'
- Genre: non-fiction
- Set in: France, International
- Published: 2009
- Publisher: Verso Books
- Publication place: London
- Media type: Print, E-book
- Pages: 176
- ISBN: 9781844672325
- OCLC: 286419853
- Website: Official website

A Short History of 'Cahiers du Cinéma' is a nonfiction book written by Emilie Bickerton and published in 2009 by Verso Books. The book is a history of the French art cinema magazine Cahiers du Cinéma from the author's perspective.

== See also ==
- Cahiers du Cinéma's Annual Top 10 Lists
