= André Bazin =

French film critic (1918–1958)

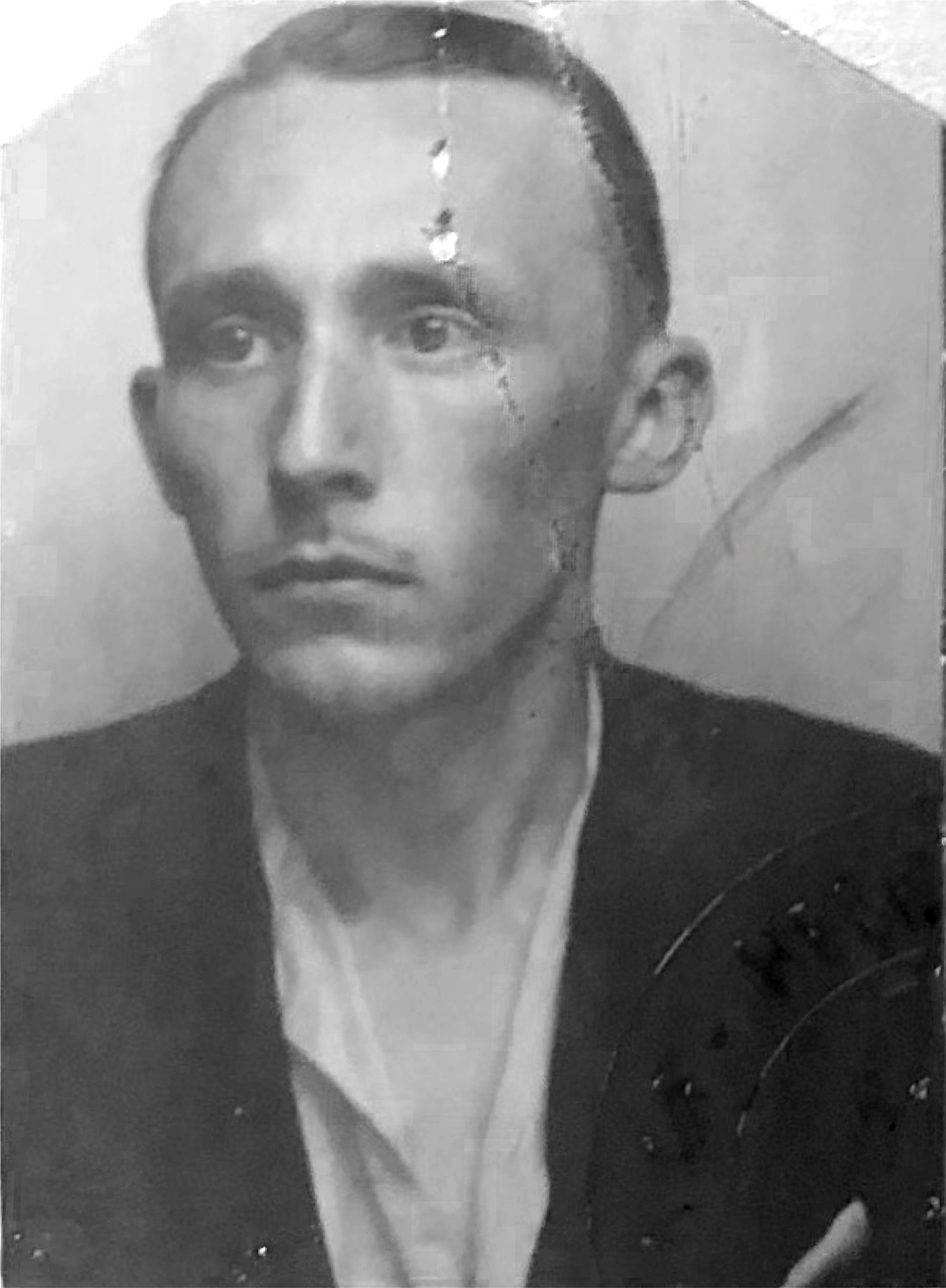
- Bazin, c. 1942
- Born: 18 April 1918; Angers, Third French Republic
- Died: 11 November 1958 (aged 40); Nogent-sur-Marne, France
- Education: École Normale Supérieure de Saint-Cloud
- Occupations: Film critic, film theorist
- Spouse: Janine Bazin (m. 1949–1958)

André Bazin (French: [bazɛ̃]; 18 April 1918 – 11 November 1958) was a renowned and influential French film critic and film theorist. He started to write about movies in 1943 and was a co-founder of the renowned film magazine Cahiers du cinéma in 1951 alongside Jacques Doniol-Valcroze and Joseph-Marie Lo Duca.

He is notable for arguing that realism is the most important function of cinema. His call for objective reality in film, as understood through the use of deep focus as well as the lack of montage, were linked to his belief that the interpretation of an entire movie or a specific scene should be left to the spectator. This placed him in opposition to prior film theorists, such as many writing during the 1920s and 1930s, who had emphasized how the cinema could manipulate reality. Bazin insisted that movies morally should serve as personalized projects by their directors to the degree that each and every one represents a director's individual vision, which reflected his broader psychological and philosophical beliefs about culture and the arts.

Although his death at forty, occurring as his writing career gained momentum, kept him from witnessing the seminal works in the French New Wave period firsthand, Bazin's viewpoints exercised a large influence on those filmmakers. For instance, François Truffaut dedicated The 400 Blows to Bazin in 1959.

== Life ==
André Bazin was born in Angers, France on 18 April 1918. After graduating from the École normale supérieure at Saint-Cloud in 1941, he pursued a career as a teacher, but was denied a teaching post due to his stammer. He then took part in the student organisation Maison des Lettres in Paris, where he founded a ciné-club during the German occupation of Paris. Bazin met future film and television producer Janine Kirsch while working at Labour and Culture, a militant organization associated with the French Communist Party during the war. They married in 1949 and had a son named Florent. Bazin was diagnosed with leukemia in 1954. He died at Nogent-sur-Marne on 11 November 1958, at the age of 40.

== Film criticism ==
Qu'est-ce que le cinéma? (What is cinema?), part III, with Bazin on the cover.

Bazin started to write about film in 1943 and was a co-founder of the renowned film magazine Cahiers du cinéma in 1951, along with Jacques Doniol-Valcroze and Joseph-Marie Lo Duca. Bazin was a major force in post-World War II film studies and criticism. He edited Cahiers until his death, and a four-volume collection of his writings was published posthumously, covering the years 1958 to 1962 and titled Qu'est-ce que le cinéma? (What is cinema?).

A selection from What Is Cinema? was translated into English and published in two volumes in the late 1960s and early 1970s. They became mainstays of film courses in the English-speaking world, but never were updated or revised. In 2009, the Canadian publisher Caboose, taking advantage of more favourable Canadian copyright laws, compiled fresh translations of some of the key essays from the collection in a single-volume edition. With annotations by translator Timothy Barnard, this became the only corrected and annotated edition of these writings in any language. In 2018, this volume was replaced by a more extensive collection of Bazin's texts translated by Barnard, André Bazin: Selected Writings 1943–1958. A new collection of Bazin's essays were released in 2022 under the title André Bazin on Adaptation: Cinema's Literary Imagination.

For the Oscar winner The Best Years of Our Lives (1946), director William Wyler and cinematographer Gregg Toland used deep focus to keep a significant character visible in the far background of the frame.

The long-held view of Bazin's critical system is that he argued for films that depicted "objective reality" (such as documentaries and films of the Italian neorealism school or as he called it "the Italian school of the Liberation"). He advocated the use of deep focus (Orson Welles, William Wyler), wide shots (Jean Renoir) and the "shot-in-depth", and preferred what he referred to as "true continuity" through mise-en-scène over experiments in editing and visual effects. For example, he extensively analyzes a scene in Wyler's The Best Years of Our Lives (with cinematography by Gregg Toland) to illuminate the function of deep-focus composition:

The action in the foreground is secondary, although interesting and peculiar enough to require our keen attention since it occupies a privileged place and surface on the screen. Paradoxically, the true action, the one that constitutes at this precise moment a turning point in the story, develops almost clandestinely in a tiny rectangle at the back of the room—in the left corner of the screen.... Thus the viewer is induced actively to participate in the drama planned by the director.

The concentration on objective reality, deep focus, and lack of montage are linked to Bazin's belief that the interpretation of a film or scene should be left to the spectator. This placed him in opposition to film theory of the 1920s and 1930s, which emphasized how the cinema could manipulate reality.

According to Dudley Andrew, Roman Catholicism and Personalism are two strong influences on Bazin's outlook of cinema. Victor Bruno says that these influences—especially Roman Catholicism—are the wellspring from which flows the essence of Bazin's understanding of "realism," which, according to him, is more closely linked with metaphysical realism than with corporeality (also called realism by certain scholars).

Another academic, Tom Gunning, identifies yet a third influence on André Bazin: Hegelianism. According to Gunning, Bazin's preference for the long take is akin to Hegel's understanding of the unfolding of history in time. This idea has been dismissed by certain authors, since Bazin privileged the long take as a means of liberty and Hegel understood that the unfolding of history would conclude in a perfectly systematized paradigm.

At any rate, Bazin's personalism led him to believe that a film should represent a director's personal vision. This idea had a pivotal importance in the development of the auteur theory, the manifesto for which François Truffaut's article "A Certain Tendency of the French Cinema" was published by his mentor Bazin in Cahiers in 1954. Bazin also championed directors like Howard Hawks, William Wyler and John Ford.

Jean Renoir famously wrote, looking back in retrospect, that he viewed Bazin as the one who "gave the patent or royalty to the cinema just as the poets of the past had crowned their kings".

== In popular culture ==
- François Truffaut dedicated The 400 Blows to Bazin, who died one day after shooting began on the film.
- Richard Linklater's film Waking Life features a discussion between filmmaker Caveh Zahedi and poet David Jewell regarding some of Bazin's film theories. There is an emphasis on Bazin's Christianity and the belief that every shot is a representation of God manifested in creation.

== Bibliography ==
=== In English ===
- Bazin, André. (2018). André Bazin: Selected Writings 1943–1958 (Timothy Barnard, Trans.) Montreal: caboose, ISBN 978-1-927852-05-7
- Bazin, André. (1967–1971). What is cinema? Vol. 1 & 2 (Hugh Gray, Trans., Ed.). Berkeley: University of California Press. ISBN 0-520-02034-0
- Bazin, André. (1973). Jean Renoir (François Truffaut, Ed.; W.W. Halsey II & William H. Simon, Trans.). New York: Simon and Schuster. ISBN 0-671-21464-0
- Bazin, André. (1978). Orson Welles: a critical view. New York: Harper and Row. ISBN 0-06-010274-8
- Andrew, Dudley. André Bazin. New York: Oxford University Press, 1978. ISBN 0-19-502165-7
- Bazin, André. (1981). French cinema of the occupation and resistance: The birth of a critical esthetic (François Truffaut, Ed., Stanley Hochman, Trans.). New York: F. Ungar Pub. Co. ISBN 0-8044-2022-X
- Bazin, André. (1982). The cinema of cruelty: From Buñuel to Hitchcock (François Truffaut, Ed.; Sabine d'Estrée, Trans.). New York: Seaver Books. ISBN 0-394-51808-X
- Bazin, André. (1985). Essays on Chaplin (Jean Bodon, Trans., Ed.). New Haven, Conn.: University of New Haven Press. LCCN 84-52687
- Bazin, André. (1996). Bazin at work: Major essays & reviews from the forties and fifties (Bert Cardullo, Ed., Trans.; Alain Piette, Trans.). New York: Routledge. (HB) ISBN 0-415-90017-4 (PB) ISBN 0-415-90018-2
- Bazin, André. (2005). French cinema from the liberation to the New Wave, 1945–1958 (Bert Cardullo, Ed.) Peter Lang Pub Inc. ISBN 978-0820448756. UNO Press, University of New Orleans Press, [New Orleans, La.], ©2012, ISBN 9781608010844

=== In French ===
- La politique des auteurs, edited by André Bazin. Interviews with Robert Bresson, Jean Renoir, Luis Buñuel, Howard Hawks, Alfred Hitchcock, Fritz Lang, Orson Welles, Michelangelo Antonioni, Carl Theodor Dreyer and Roberto Rossellini
- Qu'est-ce que le cinéma? (4 vols.), by André Bazin, originally published 1958–1962 (1958, 1959, 1961, 1962). New edition: Les Éditions du Cerf, 2003.
- André Bazin – Écrits complets (2 vol.), éditions Macula, 2018

== See also ==
- Invisible auditor
- Jacques Doniol-Valcroze
- Joseph-Marie Lo Duca
- Media criticism
  - Film criticism
  - Television criticism
- A Short History of 'Cahiers du Cinéma' by Emilie Bickerton

Media offices
Preceded by	Editor of Cahiers du cinéma 1951–1958	Succeeded by Éric Rohmer
