= Une Visite =

1954 French short film

- Directed by: François Truffaut
- Written by: François Truffaut
- Starring: Francis Cognany
- Cinematography: Jacques Rivette
- Edited by: Alain Resnais
- Running time: 8 minutes
- Country: France
- Language: French

Une Visite ('A Visit') was the first short film made by 23-year-old François Truffaut. It was filmed in Jacques Doniol-Valcroze’s apartment and its crew included Jacques Rivette, Alain Resnais and Truffaut's boyhood friend Robert Lachenay. It was only briefly screened for friends and is the only Truffaut film that has never been available for public viewing since Truffaut was unhappy with it.

Truffaut usually told people that no copies of the film existed, but in 1982 he made a 35mm print of the film and screened it for friends.

== Plot ==
A young man tries unsuccessfully to seduce a young woman with whom he lives.

== Cast ==
- Francis Cognany
- Florence Doniol-Valcroze
- Laura Mauri
- Jean-José Richer
