= Les Mistons =

1957 film by François Truffaut

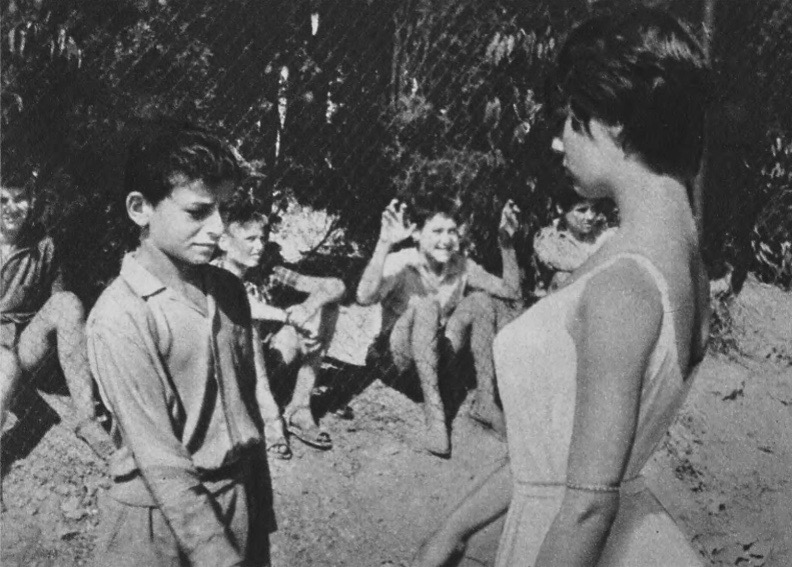
- Photograph of a scene from the film Les Mistons
- Directed by: François Truffaut
- Written by: François Truffaut
- Based on: Virginales by Maurice Pons
- Produced by: Robert Lachenay
- Starring: Gérard Blain; Bernadette Lafont; Michel François
- Narrated by: Michel François
- Cinematography: Jean Malige
- Edited by: Cécile Decugis
- Music by: Maurice Le Roux
- Production company: Les Films du Carrosse
- Release date: 6 November 1958
- Running time: 26 minutes 17 minutes (Truffaut's re-cut version)
- Language: French

Les Mistons (The Mischief Makers) is a French short film written and directed by François Truffaut in 1957. It was his second film after Une Visite in 1955 but it is considered his "first short film of any real consequence". Truffaut simply called it "my first real film". Moreover, it was Bernadette Lafont's film debut. She was at that time Gérard Blain's wife. The film demonstrates already some examples for Truffaut's "trademark tracking shots" and would "help define his style" as well as "set Truffaut on a path for his career". Truffaut's narrative stresses the details of life, hereby establishing one of the traits of the French New Wave. Thus he also became a predecessor of French film directors such as Jean-Pierre Jeunet (Amélie). It has been stated that the formation of the French New Wave could be "tracked through two short films": Jean-Luc Godard's All the Boys Are Called Patrick and Truffaut's Les Mistons. In 2013 the Museum of Modern Art in New York City screened this film together with Truffaut's The 400 Blows.

== Plot ==
The story takes place in Provencal France, where a group of young boys ("mistons" roughly translates "brats") are infatuated with a beautiful young woman. Jealous of her passionate affair, they conspire to make mischief for the woman and her boyfriend.

== Production ==
The film was shot on location in Bernadette Lafont's hometown Nîmes in Southern France. It sports the town's Roman arena. It was shot on 35mm film without live sound.

== DVD release ==
In 1999 the film was released on a DVD which also contained Antoine and Colette. In 2007 Les Mistons was again released, this time as a part of a DVD collection. The extras included an introduction by film historian Serge Toubiana and an audio commentary by Truffaut's assistant, Claude de Givray.
