= Entrevues Belfort Film Festival =

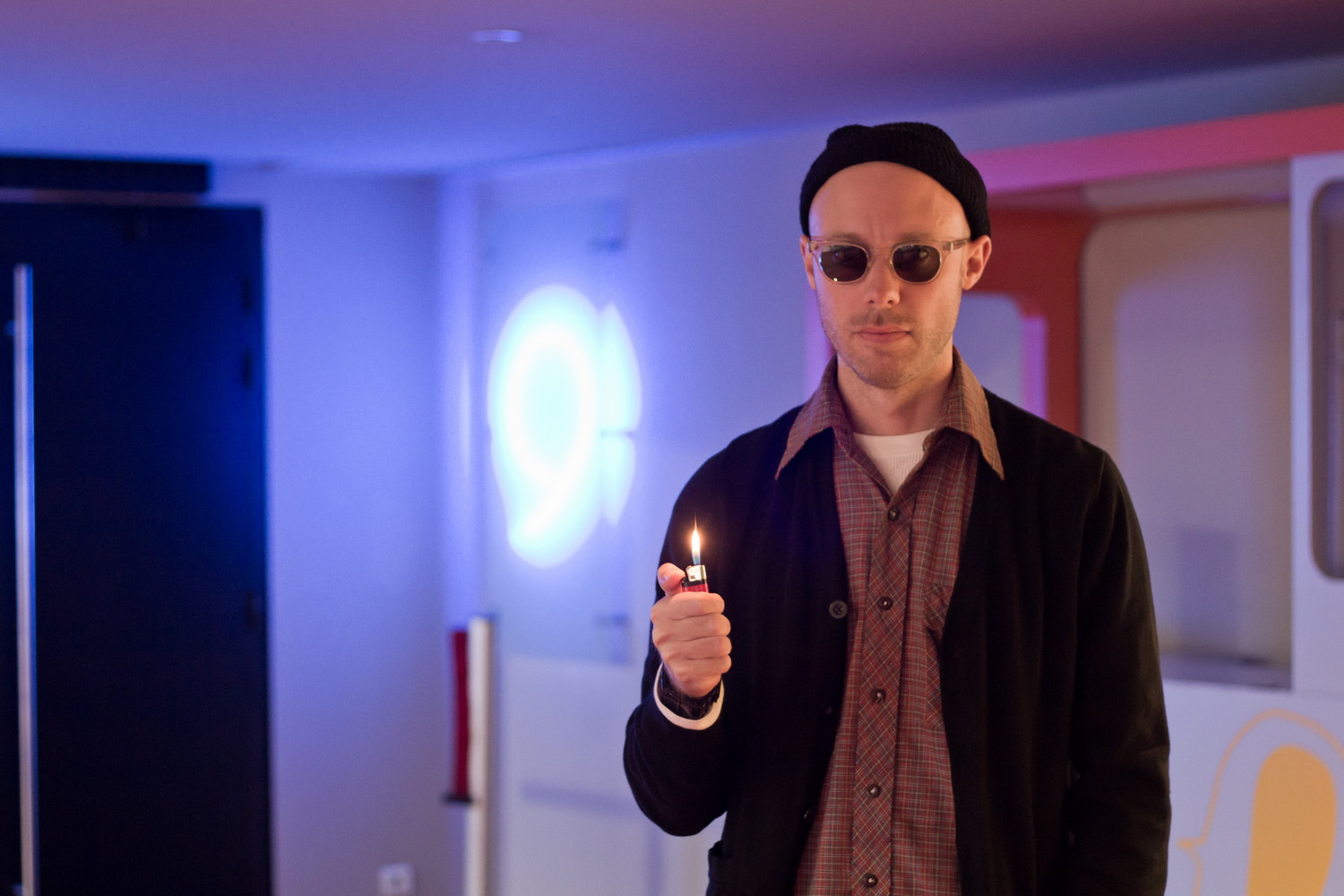
Joel Potrykus at the 2012 Belfort Entrevues Film Festival

The Entrevues Belfort Film Festival is an annual international film festival, founded in 1986 by Janine Bazin and held in Belfort, France. Through its First Films International Competition (from 1st to 3rd film), the festival is dedicated to support emerging filmmakers. Alongside of the International Competition, the festival focuses on rediscovering filmmakers from the cinematic heritage with retrospectives, tributes and encounters. It also offers a Post-production Grant for first international features films.

Since 1986, the festival has been successively directed by Janine Bazin (1986-2000), Bernard Benoliel (2001-2004), Catherine Bizern (2005-2012) and Lili Hinstin (since 2013). Many first films of now renowned young directors were selected by EntreVues Belfort, such as:

- Darren Aronofsky
- Alain Guiraudie
- Chen Kaige
- Abdellatif Kechiche
- Wang Chao
- Athina Rachel Tsangari
- Rabah Ameur-Zaimèche
- Angela Shanelec
- Patricia Mazuy
- Yousry Nasrallah
- Olivier Assayas
- Jean-Claude Brisseau
- João Botelho
- Laurent Cantet
- Leos Carax
- Pedro Costa
- Idrissa Ouedraogo
- François Ozon
- Nicolas Philibert
- Paulo Rocha
- Walter Salles
- Claire Simon
- Lars Von Trier, and also, more recently, Laurent Achard, Brillante Mendoza, Albert Serra, Sophie Letourneur or Tariq Teguia.

Since 1986, retrospectives have been dedicated to international directors such as: Michelangelo Antonioni, David Cronenberg, Michael Cimino, Jerzy Skolimowski, Barbet Schroeder, Paul Schrader, Miloš Forman, Marco Bellocchio, Paul Verhoeven, Abel Ferrara, Jean-Claude Brisseau, Jean-Pierre Mocky, John Carpenter, Jacques Doillon, Kiyoshi Kurosawa, Otar Iosseliani or Bong Joon-ho.

In 2015, the festival has celebrated its 30th edition.

== Awards ==
Grand Prix Janine Bazin - Best Feature Film

- 2024 : Softshell by Jinho Myung (USA, 86 min)
- 2023 : O Dia que te Conheci by André Novais Oliveira (Brésil, 71 min)
- 2022 : É Noite na América by Ana Vaz (Brasil, 66 min)
- 2021 : Father by Deng Wei (China, 96 min)
- 2020 : Traverser by Joël Akafou (France - Burkina Faso - Belgique, 77 min)
- 2019 : Los Miembros by la familia by Mateo Bendesky (Argentina, 85 min)
- 2018 : Classical Period by Ted Fendt (USA, 62 min)
- 2017 : Nul homme n'est une île by Dominique Marchais (France, 1h36)
- 2016: The Park by Damien Manivel (France, 71 min)
- 2015: Ben Zaken by Efrat Corem (Israel, 90 min)
- 2014: I am the people (Je suis le peuple), by Anna Roussillon (France, 111 min)
- 2013: Revolution Zendj, by Tariq Teguia (Algeria - France - Lebanon - Qatar, 137 min)
- 2012: Leviathan, by Verena Paravel and Lucien Castaing-Taylor (UK - France - USA, 87 min)
- 2011: L'Estate di Giacomo, by Alessandro Comodin (France - Italia - Belgium, 78 min)

Grand Prix Best Short Film

- 2017 : She's beyond me by Toru Takano (Japan, 42 min)
- 2016: Koropa by Laura Henno (France, 20 min)
- 2015: Antonio, lindo Antonio by Ana Maria Gomes (France, 42 min)
- 2014: A Tale, by Katrin Thomas (Germany, 14 min)
- 2013: Peine perdue, by Arthur Harari (France, 38 min)
- 2012: Vilaine fille mauvais garçon, by Justine Triet (France, 30 min)
- 2012 Mention: Ovos de dinossauro na sala de estar, by Rafael Urban (Brazil, 12 min)
- 2011: Drari, by Kamal Lazraq (France, 41 min)

Distribution Support Award

- 2017 : Playing men by Matjaz Ivanisin (Slovenia-Croatia, 60 min)
- 2016: Before Summer Ends by Maryam Goormaghtigh (France, 80 min)
- 2015: Bienvenue à Madagascar by Franssou Prenant (France, 102 min)
- 2014: The Mend, by John Magary (USA, 111 min)
- 2013: See You Next Tuesday, by Drew Tobia (USA, 82 min)

One + One Award

- 2017 : Water Folds by Jung Hee Biann Seo (South Korea, 17 min)
- 2016: Viejo Calavera, by Kiro Russo (Bolivia / Qatar, 80 min)
- 2015: Bienvenue à Madagascar by Franssou Prenant (France, 102 min)
- 2014 :Hillbrow, by Nicolas Boone (France, 32 min)
- 2013: Juke Box, by Ilan Klipper (France, 23 min)
- 2012: Leviathan, by Verena Paravel and Lucien Castaing-Taylor (UK - France - USA, 87 min)
- 2011: Le Sommeil d'or, by Davy Chou (France - Cambodia, 96 min)
- 2011 Mention: Le Marin masqué, by Sophie Letourneur (France, 36 min)

CAMIRA (Cinema And Moving Images Research Assembly) Award :

- 2017 : Milla by Valérie Massadian (France-Portugal, 2h06) and Rouge amoureuse by L. Garcia (France, 23 min)
- 2016: Brothers of the Night by Patric Chiha (Austria, 88 min)
- 2015: Roundabout in my head by Hassen Ferhani (Documentary, Algeria - France - Qatar - Libanon - Netherlands, 100 min)
- 2014 :Hillbrow, by Nicolas Boone (France, 32 min)

Audience Feature Film Award

- 2017 : Cornélius le meunier hurlant by Yann Le Quellec (France, 1h42)
- 2016: De Sas en sas by Rachida Brakni ( France, 82 min)
- 2015: Roundabout in my head by Hassen Ferhani (Documentary, Algeria - France - Qatar - Libanon - Netherlands, 100 min)
- 2014: Je suis le peuple, by Anna Roussillon (France, 111 min)
- 2013: Round Trip, by Meyar Al-Roumi (France - Syria, 74 min)
- 2012: Everybody In Our Family (Papa vient dimanche), by Radu Jude (Romania, 108 min)
- 2011: Louise Wimmer, by Cyril Mennegun (France, 80 min)

Audience Short Film Award

- 2017 : She's beyond me by Toru Takano (Japan, 42 min)
- 2016: La Maison, by Aliona Zagurovska (France, 31 min)
- 2015: Antonio, lindo Antonio by Ana Maria Gomes (France, 42 min)
- 2014 :Hillbrow, by Nicolas Boone (France, 32 min)
- 2013: Être vivant, by Emmanuel Gras (France, 16 min)
- 2012: Vilaine fille mauvais garçon, by Justine Triet (France, 30 min)
- 2011: Un Monde sans femmes, by Guillaume Brac (France, 58 min)

First French Fiction Gérard Frot Cot-Coutaz Award (from 1993 to 2004 and again from 2016)

- 2017 : Les Garçons sauvages by Bertrand Mandico (France, 1h50)
- 2016: Joan the Pope by Jean Breschand ( France, 89 min)

Documentaire sur Grand Ecran Award (until 2012)

- 2012: Leviathan, by Verena Paravel and Lucien Castaing-Taylor (UK - France - USA, 87 min)
- 2011: L'Eté de Giacomo, by Alessandro Comodin (France - Italia - Belgium, 78 min)

First French Film Award (until 2012)

- 2012: Ma Belle gosse, by Shalimar Preuss (France, 80 min)
- 2011: Dernière séance, by Laurent Achard (France, 78 min)
- 2011 Mention: OK, Enough, Goodbye, by Rania Attieh and Daniel Garcia (Lebanon, 93 min)

Janine Bazin Award for Best Actor/Actress (until 2012, then it became the Grand Prix Janine Bazin - Best Feature)

- 2012: Mihaela Sirbu in Everybody In Our Family (Papa vient dimanche), by Radu Jude (Romania, 108 min)
- 2011: Laure Calamy in Un Monde sans femmes, by Guillaume Brac (France, 58 min)
- 2011: Daniel Arzrouni in OK, Enough, Goodbye, by Rania Attieh and Daniel Garcia (Lebanon, 93 min)
