= Cahiers du Cinéma =

French film journal

- Cover of the inaugural issue (April 1951), with a still from Sunset Boulevard
- Categories: Film magazine
- Frequency: Monthly
- First issue: April 1951; 75 years ago
- Country: France
- Based in: Paris
- Language: French
- Website: www.cahiersducinema.com
- ISSN: 0008-011X

Cahiers du Cinéma (French pronunciation: [kaje dy sinema], lit. 'notebooks on cinema') is a French film magazine co-founded in 1951 by André Bazin, Jacques Doniol-Valcroze, and Joseph-Marie Lo Duca. It developed from the earlier magazine Revue du Cinéma (lit. 'review of cinema' established in 1928) involving members of two Paris film clubs: Objectif 49 (Objective 49—Robert Bresson, Jean Cocteau, and Alexandre Astruc, among others) and the Ciné-Club du Quartier Latin (Latin Quarter Cinema Club).

Initially edited by Doniol-Valcroze and, after 1957, by Éric Rohmer (aka, Maurice Scherer), it included amongst its writers Jacques Rivette, Jean-Luc Godard, Claude Chabrol, and François Truffaut, who went on to become highly influential filmmakers. It is the oldest French-language film magazine in publication.

== History ==
The first issue of Cahiers appeared in April 1951. Much of its head staff, including Bazin, Doniol-Valcroze, Lo Duca, and the various younger, less-established critics, had met and shared their beliefs about film through their involvement in the publication of Revue du Cinéma from 1946 until its final issue in 1948; Cahiers was created as a successor to this earlier magazine.

Early issues of Cahiers were small journals of thirty pages which bore minimalist covers, distinctive for their lack of headlines in favor of film stills on a distinctive bright yellow background. Each issue contained four or five articles (with at least one piece by Bazin in most issues), most of which were reviews of specific films or appreciations of directors, supplemented on occasion by longer theoretical essays. The first few years of the magazine's publication were dominated by Bazin, who was the de facto head of the editorial board.

Bazin intended Cahiers to be a continuation of the intellectual form of criticism that Revue had printed, which prominently featured his articles advocating for realism as the most valuable quality of cinema. As more issues of Cahiers were published, however, Bazin found that a group of young proteges and critics serving as editors underneath him were beginning to disagree with him in the pages of the magazine. Godard would voice his discontent with Bazin as early as 1952, when he challenged Bazin's views on editing in an article for the September issue of Cahiers. Gradually, the tastes of these young critics drifted away from those of Bazin, as members of the group began to write critical appreciations of more commercial American filmmakers such as Alfred Hitchcock and Howard Hawks rather than the canonized French and Italian filmmakers that interested Bazin.

The younger critics broke completely with Bazin by 1954, when an article in the January issue by Truffaut attacked what he called La qualité française (lit. ' the French quality', usually translated as "The Tradition of Quality"), denouncing many critically respected French films of the time as being unimaginative, oversimplified, and even immoral adaptations of literary works. The article became the manifesto for the politique des auteurs (lit. ' the policy of the authors '), which became the label for Cahiers younger critics' emphasis on the importance of the director in the creation of a film—as a film's "author"—and their re-evaluation of Hollywood films and directors such as Hitchcock, Hawks, Jerry Lewis, Robert Aldrich, Nicholas Ray, and Fritz Lang. Subsequently, American critic Andrew Sarris latched onto the word, "auteur", and paired it with the English word, "theory"; hence coining the phrase the "auteur theory" by which this critical approach is known in English-language film criticism.

After the publication of Truffaut's article, Doniol-Valcroze and most of the Cahiers editors besides Bazin and Lo Duca rallied behind the rebellious authors; Lo Duca left Cahiers a year later, while Bazin, in failing health, gave editorial control of the magazine to Rohmer and largely left Paris, though he continued to write for the magazine. Now with control over the magazine's ideological approaches to film, the younger critics (minus Godard, who had left Paris in 1952, not to return until 1956) changed the format of Cahiers somewhat, frequently conducting interviews with directors deemed "auteurs" and voting on films in a "Council" of ten core critics. These critics came to champion non-American directors as well, writing on the mise en scène (the "dominant object of study" at the magazine) of such filmmakers as Jean Renoir, Roberto Rossellini, Kenji Mizoguchi, Max Ophüls, and Jean Cocteau, many of whom Bazin had introduced them to.

By the end of the 1950s, many of the remaining editors of Cahiers, however, were becoming increasingly dissatisfied with the mere act of writing film criticism. Spurred on by the return of Godard to Paris in 1956 (who in the interim had made a short film himself), many of the younger critics became interested in making films themselves. Godard, Truffaut, Chabrol, Doniol-Valcroze, and even Rohmer, who had officially succeeded Doniol-Valcroze as head editor in 1958, began to divide their time between making films and writing about them. The films that these critics made were experimental explorations of various theoretical, artistic, and ideological aspects of the film form, and would, along with the films of young French filmmakers outside the Cahiers circle, form the basis for the cinematic movement known as the French New Wave. Meanwhile, Cahiers underwent staff changes, as Rohmer hired new editors such as Jean Douchet to fill the roles of those editors who were now making films, while other existing editors, particularly Jacques Rivette, began to write even more for the magazine. Many of the newer critical voices (except for Rivette) largely ignored the films of the New Wave for Hollywood when they were not outright criticizing them, creating friction between much of the directorial side of the younger critics and the head editor Rohmer. A group of five Cahiers editors, including Godard and Doniol-Valcroze and led by Rivette, urged Rohmer to refocus the magazine's content on newer films such as their own. When he refused, the "gang of five" forced Rohmer out and installed Rivette as his replacement in 1963.

Rivette shifted political and social concerns farther to the left, and began a trend in the magazine of paying more attention to non-Hollywood films. The style of the journal moved through literary modernism in the early 1960s to radicalism and dialectical materialism by 1970. Moreover, during the mid-1970s the magazine was run by a Maoist editorial collective. In the mid-1970s, a review of the American film Jaws marked the magazine's return to more commercial perspectives, and an editorial turnover: (Serge Daney, Serge Toubiana, Thierry Jousse, Antoine de Baecque, and Charles Tesson). It led to the rehabilitation of some of the old Cahiers favourites, as well as some new film makers like Manoel de Oliveira, Raoul Ruiz, Hou Hsiao-hsien, Youssef Chahine, and Maurice Pialat. Recent writers have included Daney, André Téchiné, Léos Carax, Olivier Assayas, Danièle Dubroux, and Serge Le Péron.

In 1998, the Editions de l'Etoile (the company publishing Cahiers) was acquired by the press group Le Monde. Traditionally losing money, the magazine attempted a make-over in 1999 to gain new readers, leading to a first split among writers and resulting in a magazine addressing all visual arts in a post-modernist approach. This version of the magazine printed ill-received opinion pieces on reality TV or video games that confused the traditional readership of the magazine.

Le Monde took full editorial control of the magazine in 2003, appointing Jean-Michel Frodon as editor-in-chief. In February 2009, Cahiers was acquired from Le Monde by Richard Schlagman, also owner of Phaidon Press, a worldwide publishing group which specialises in books on the visual arts. In July 2009, Stéphane Delorme and Jean-Philippe Tessé were promoted respectively to the positions of editor-in-chief and deputy chief editor.

In February 2020, the magazine was bought by several French entrepreneurs, including Xavier Niel and Alain Weill. The entire editorial staff resigned, saying the change posed a threat to their editorial independence.

== Annual top 10 films list ==
The magazine has compiled a list of the top 10 films of each year for much of its existence.

== See also ==
- Cinephilia
- List of film periodicals

Similar periodicals

- Empire
- Positif
- Sight & Sound
