= Janine Bazin =

French film and television producer (1923–2003)

- Born: Janine Kirsch; 29 January 1923; Paris, France
- Died: 31 May 2003 (aged 80); Villeneuve-Saint-Georges, Val-de-Marne, France
- Citizenship: France
- Occupations: Film producer; Television producer
- Era: French New Wave
- Spouse: André Bazin (m. 1949; died 1958)
- Children: 1

Janine Bazin (née Kirsch; 29 January 1923 – 31 May 2003) was a French film and television producer of the French New Wave movement. Alongside André S. Labarthe, she was the co-producer of an hour-long series of programmes called Cineastes de Notre Temps (English: Filmmakers of Our Time), which was broadcast from 1964 to 1974. From 1980, Bazin was co-producer of the series Cinema De Notre Temps and established the Entrevues Belfort Film Festival. The Janine Bazin Award for Best Performance was named after her.

== Biography ==
On 29 January 1923, Bazin was born Janine Kirsch in Paris. At the age of 25, she became secretary of the film department of the Work and Culture, aiming to attract cinema, concert and theatre goers at an association established at the time of the Liberation of Paris. In 1948, while working at the Work and Culture, Bazin met the French Communist Party member André Bazin, whom she married in May 1949. They had one child. The couple were instrumental in the career development of François Truffaut, the future film director who had a troubled childhood and who was released from house arrest with intervention from the Bazin's after Truffaut twice deserted during his military service in the French Army.

Following the death of her husband in 1958, she made contact with the Radiodiffusion-Télévision Française's Pierre Schaeffer-directed research department in January 1962 with the idea of a series of programmes focused on cinema and long interviews of young filmmakers forming part of the French New Wave. The hour-long series of programmes known as Cineastes de Notre Temps (English: Filmmakers of Our Time) was first broadcast in 1964 and concluded in 1974 when it was axed by the French network Office de Radiodiffusion Télévision Française with Bazin co-producing with André S. Labarthe. After that, Truffaut helped Bazin when she had lost her money.

She went on to co-produce the series Cinema De Notre Temps with Labarthe beginning in 1980. From this came a collaboration on the 2000 film One Day In The Life Of Andrei Arsenevich, Chantal Akerman's self-portrait, a film about Andrei Tarkovsky by Chris Marker and other projects concerning John Cassavetes, Hou Hsiao-hsien, and Éric Rohmer. That same year, Bazin established the Entrevues Belfort Film Festival, an international film festival which promotes young filmmakers' works and conducts retrospectives to celebrate older individuals. With the mayor Jean-Pierre Chevènement's support, she turned it into its current form of an annual competition in 1986. Bazin stood down as festival delegate in 2001, being replaced by Bernard Bénoliel. She portrayed herself in the 1993 documentary film François Truffaut: Stolen Portraits. Bazin died at Villeneuve-Saint-Georges Hospital, in the Paris suburb of Villeneuve-Saint-Georges, located in Val-de-Marne, on 31 May 2003.

== Legacy ==
Jean-Luc Godard, the French film director, described Bazin as "a star who lit up the history of cinema". Antoine de Baecque of Libération commented on Bazin's legacy "Janine B. has not signed any works, films, texts, or books. And yet her creative role was recognized by all, to the point that it has been said that this tiny woman was "one of the great ladies of French cinema". Writing in Le Monde, Jean-François Rauger noted she was "at the origin, with others, of a very singular way of making television." The Janine Bazin Award for Best Performance was named for her and a jury selected a "promising young actor" to receive the award at the Entrevues Belfort Film Festival.
