= Dominique Reymond =

French actress (born 1957)

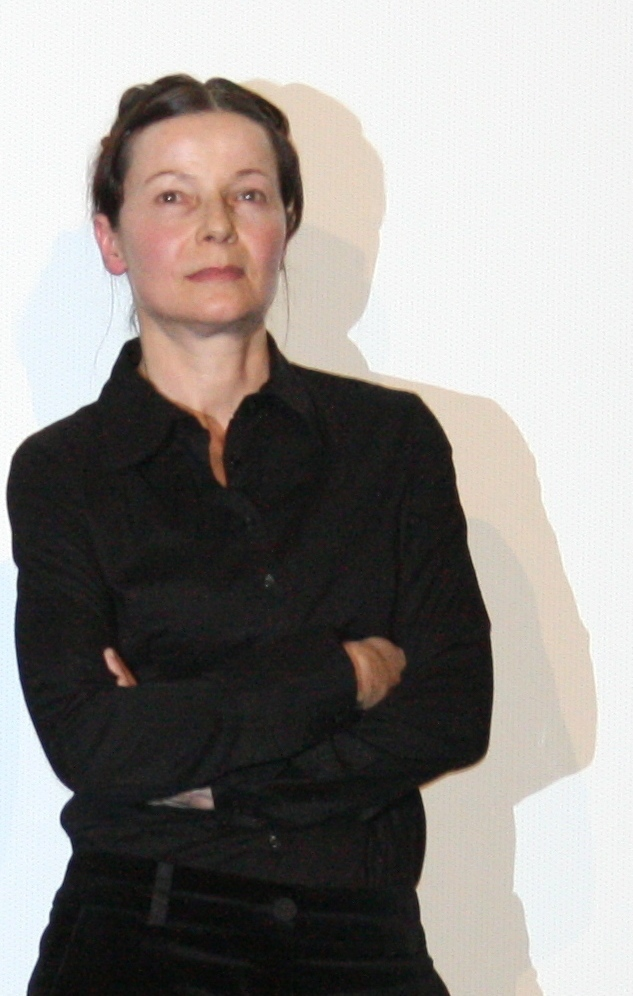
- Born: 12 February 1957 (age 69); Geneva, Switzerland
- Occupation: Actress
- Years active: 1978-present

Dominique Reymond (born 12 February 1957) is a French actress. She has appeared in more than seventy films since 1984.

== Career ==
She has been to the Geneva Conservatory.

She began her career in theater in 1978, playing the title role in Phèdre, directed by Jean-Christian Grinevald.

She made her on-screen debut in 1984, with little parts in the movies Boy Meets Girl directed by Leos Carax and Pinot simple flic directed by Gérard Jugnot.

She was awarded twice by the Prix du Syndicat de la critique for her roles in Mrs. Klein directed by Brigitte Jaques-Wajeman in 1993 and The Playboy of the Western World directed by Marc Paquien.

In 2015, she received the Molière Award for Best Supporting Actress for the play Comment vous racontez la partie, written and directed by Yasmina Reza. She was nominated four other times for the Molière Awards : as Best Supporting Actress in 2005 for A Spanish Play, also written by Yasmina Reza and directed by Luc Bondy, and in the category Best Actress for The Pelican directed by Gian Manuel Rau in 2008, The Night of the Iguana directed by Georges Lavaudant in 2009 and The Chairs directed by Luc Bondy in 2011.

== Theater ==
Year	Title	Author	Director	Notes
1978	Phèdre	Jean Racine	Jean-Christian Grinevald	
1980	La Colonie pénitentiaire	Franz Kafka	Jean-Pierre Klein	
1981	Caligula	Albert Camus	Patrick Guinand	
1981	Ainsi Solange, Paris ou ailleurs	Cosmas Koronéos	Jean-Christian Grinevald	
1981	Les Trente Millions de Gladiator	Eugène Labiche	Françoise Petit	
1982–83	Good Little Girls	Countess of Ségur	Pascale Bardet, ...	
1983	Falsch	René Kalisky	Antoine Vitez	
1984	Le Héron	Vassili Axionov	Antoine Vitez	
1984	The Seagull	Anton Chekhov	Antoine Vitez	
1984–85	L’Heureux Stratagème	Pierre de Marivaux	Jacques Lassalle	
1986	La Ville	Paul Claudel	Bernard Sobel	
1986–87	L’Échange	Paul Claudel	Antoine Vitez	
1987	Good Little Girls	Countess of Ségur	Pascale Bardet, ...	
1989	The Forest	Alexander Ostrovsky	Bernard Sobel	
1989–90	Danton's Death	Georg Büchner	Klaus Michael Grüber	
1990	Tartuffe	Molière	Bernard Sobel	
1990–91	Phaedra	Marina Tsvetaeva	Sophie Loucachevsky	
1991	Par hasard	Gaston Couté, Honoré de Balzac, Charles Ferdinand Ramuz & Marina Tsvetaeva	Sophie Loucachevsky	
1991	Tous en ligne	Nathalie Krebs, Ged Marlon & Dominique Reymond	Ged Marlon	
1991	Indices terrestres	Marina Tsvetaeva	Éric Didry	
1992	Weimarland	Bruno Bayen	Bruno Bayen	
1992	John and Mary	Pascal Rambert	Pascal Rambert	
1993	Mrs. Klein	Nicholas Wright	Brigitte Jaques-Wajeman	Prix du Syndicat de la critique - Best Actress
1995	Mrs. Klein	Nicholas Wright	Brigitte Jaques-Wajeman	
1995	Antony and Cleopatra	William Shakespeare	Pascal Rambert	
1997–98	In Praise of Shadows	Jun'ichirō Tanizaki	Jacques Rebotier	
2000	Man Equals Man	Bertolt Brecht	Jean-Pierre Vincent	
2001	In Praise of Shadows	Jun'ichirō Tanizaki	Jacques Rebotier	
2002	Visits	Jon Fosse	Marie-Louise Bischofberger	
2004–05	A Spanish Play	Yasmina Reza	Luc Bondy	Nominated - Molière Award for Best Supporting Actress
2006	The Playboy of the Western World	John Millington Synge	Marc Paquien	Prix du Syndicat de la critique - Best Actress
2007–09	L’Acte inconnu	Valère Novarina	Valère Novarina	
2008	The Pelican	August Strindberg	Gian Manuel Rau	Nominated - Molière Award for Best Actress
2008–09	Feux	August Stramm	Daniel Jeanneteau & Marie-Christine Soma	
2009	Trois quartiers	Valérie Mréjen	Gian Manuel Rau	
2009	The Night of the Iguana	Tennessee Williams	Georges Lavaudant	Nominated - Molière Award for Best Actress
2010–11	The Chairs	Eugène Ionesco	Luc Bondy	Nominated - Molière Award for Best Actress
2012–14	The Seagull	Anton Chekhov	Arthur Nauzyciel	
2013	Rome-Nanterre	Valérie Mréjen	Gian Manuel Rau	
2014–15	Comment vous racontez la partie	Yasmina Reza	Yasmina Reza	Molière Award for Best Supporting Actress
2015	Toujours la tempête	Peter Handke	Alain Françon	
2015	The Giants of the Mountain	Luigi Pirandello	Stéphane Braunschweig	
2016–18	The Glass Menagerie	Tennessee Williams	Daniel Jeanneteau	
2017–18	The Apple in the Dark	Clarice Lispector	Marie-Christine Soma	
2019	Veillée de famille	Gilles Gaston-Dreyfus	Gilles Gaston-Dreyfus	
2019–20	The Rest Will Be Familiar to You from Cinema	Martin Crimp	Daniel Jeanneteau	
2021–22	West Pier	Bernard-Marie Koltès	Ludovic Lagarde	
2022	Foucault en Californie	Simeon Wade	Lionel Baier	
2024	Foucault en Californie	Simeon Wade	Lionel Baier	

== Filmography ==
Year	Title	Role	Director	Notes
1984	Boy Meets Girl	The neighbor	Leos Carax	
1984	Pinot simple flic		Gérard Jugnot	
1986	Zone rouge	Nathalie Cheylard	Robert Enrico	
1986	La femme secrète	Christiane	Sébastien Grall	
1986	Nuit de Chine		Catherine Corsini	Short
1988	Poker		Catherine Corsini	
1988	A Strange Place to Meet	Mme Martinet	François Dupeyron	
1989	Baptême	Colette	René Féret	
1992	Betty		Claude Chabrol	
1992	La révolte des enfants	Jeanne	Gérard Poitou-Weber	
1992	Séparément vôtre	Catherine	Michel Boisrond	TV movie
1993	The Birth of Love	Hélène	Philippe Garrel	
1996	Love, etc.	Marie's mother	Marion Vernoux	
1996	Will It Snow for Christmas?	The mother	Sandrine Veysset	Festival du Film de Paris - Best Actress
1997	Artemisia	Tassi's sister	Agnès Merlet	
1997	Le cri du corbeau	Louise	Serge Meynard	TV movie
1998	On a très peu d'amis	Maryse	Sylvain Monod	
1998	Denis	Juliette	Catherine Corsini	TV movie
1998	La poursuite du vent	Viviane	Nina Companeez	TV mini-series
1999	Sachs' Disease	Madame Leblanc	Michel Deville	
1999	The Bridge	Claire Daboval	Frédéric Auburtin & Gérard Depardieu	
2000	Sade	Madame de Lancris	Benoît Jacquot	
2000	Presque rien	The mother	Sébastien Lifshitz	
2000	L'affaire Marcorelle	Claudie Marcorelle	Serge Le Péron	
2000	Sentimental Destinies	Julie Desca	Olivier Assayas	Nominated - Swiss Film Award for Best Actress
2001	Avec tout mon amour	Dolorès	Amalia Escriva	
2001	Simon		Régis Roinsard	Short
2001	Un pique-nique chez Osiris	Mathilde Ancelin	Nina Companeez	TV movie Festival International de Programmes Audiovisuels: Best Actress
2002	In My Skin	The client	Marina de Van	
2002	Les Diables	The director	Christophe Ruggia	
2002	Demonlover	Karen	Olivier Assayas	
2002	La dame de la plage	Nadine	Paule Sardou	Short
2002	Le gave	Anne	Christian Bonnet	TV movie
2003	Variété française	Edith's mother	Frédéric Videau	
2003	À cran	Claire	Alain Tasma	TV movie
2003	Une famille à tout prix	Mireille	Jacques Renard	TV movie
2004	Process	The metro lady	C.S. Leigh	
2004	Ma Mère	Marthe	Christophe Honoré	
2004	Ne fais pas ça!	Sonia / Ruth	Luc Bondy	
2004	Tomorrow We Move	Madame Delacre	Chantal Akerman	
2004	Princesse Marie	Geneviève	Benoît Jacquot	TV movie
2005	Hell	Michelle	Danis Tanović	
2005	L'oeil de l'autre	Juliette	John Lvoff	
2005	Vénus & Apollon	The woman	Olivier Guignard	TV series (1 episode)
2006	Carmen	Eva	Jean-Pierre Limosin	TV movie
2006	Une saison Sibélius	Martha	Mario Fanfani	TV movie
2007	Towards Zero	Madame Geoffroy	Pascal Thomas	
2007	Il sera une fois...	Nadine	Sandrine Veysset	
2007	Le Dernier des fous	Nadège	Laurent Achard	
2007	Le pendu	Susanne	Claire Devers	TV movie
2007	En marge des jours	Sandrine	Emmanuel Finkiel	TV movie
2008	Summer Hours	Lisa Marly	Olivier Assayas	
2008	Les murs porteurs	Solange Weil	Cyril Gelblat	
2008	Le plaisir de chanter	The informer	Ilan Duran Cohen	
2008	Le nouveau protocole	Louise Verneuil	Thomas Vincent	
2008	L'affaire Bruay-en-Artois	Solange Valmon	Charlotte Brändström	TV movie
2009	Adieu Gary	Maria	Nassim Amaouche	
2009	Don't Look Back	The voice	Marina de Van	
2009	Suite noire	The gallery owner	Claire Devers	TV series (1 episode)
2010	Bus Palladium	Marina	Christopher Thompson	
2010	Insoupçonnable	Hélène	Gabriel Le Bomin	
2010	63 regards	Woman 2	Christophe Pellet	Short
2011	Une île	The narrator	Anne Alix	
2011	Notre étrangère	Marie	Sarah Bouyain	
2011	Pour Djamila	Simone de Beauvoir	Caroline Huppert	TV movie
2012	Populaire	Madame Shorofsky	Régis Roinsard	
2012	Farewell, My Queen	Madame de Rochereuil	Benoît Jacquot	
2012	Le jour de la grenouille	Magg	Béatrice Pollet	
2012	Noces (Stravinsky/Ramuz)	The actress	Philippe Béziat	
2012	La dérive	Virginie	Matthieu Salmon	Short
2012	Au nom d'Athènes	The narrator	Fabrice Hourlier	TV mini-series
2014	Maestro	Francine	Léa Fazer	
2014	Fool Circle	Claude	Vincent Mariette	
2014	Bodybuilder	Muriel	Roschdy Zem	
2014	Il venait de Roumanie	Clément's mother	Jean-Baptiste Durand	Short
2014	Marie Curie, une femme sur le front	Marie Curie	Alain Brunard	TV movie Luchon International Film Festival - Best Actress
2015	Des Apaches	Dr. Reymond	Nassim Amaouche	
2015	Diary of a Chambermaid	The recruiter	Benoît Jacquot	
2017	L'Amant double	Agnès Wexler	François Ozon	
2017	L'histoire d'une mère	The death	Sandrine Veysset	
2017	Hugues	Micheline	Pascal Cervo	Short
2017	Les grands esprits	Andrée	Jonathan Comnène	Short
2017	Robin	Anne	Alice Douard	TV movie
2017	Les Petits Meurtres d'Agatha Christie	Macha Semenoff	Nicolas Picard-Dreyfuss	TV series (1 episode)
2018	Age of Iron	The narrator	Philippe Bérenger, & Henrike Sandner, ...	TV mini-series
2018	Ondes de choc	Claude	Frédéric Mermoud	TV series (1 episode)
2019	Mémorable	Michelle	Bruno Collet	Short
2019	La forêt d'argent	Valeria	Emmanuel Bourdieu	TV movie
2020	Éléonore	Martine	Amro Hamzawi	
2020	My Best Part	The therapist	Nicolas Maury	
2021	Les héritiers	Diane	Jean-Marc Brondolo	TV movie
2022	Temps de chien	The editor	Vanessa Caffin	Short
2022	Irma Vep	The therapist	Olivier Assayas	TV mini-series
2023	Last Dance	Lise	Delphine Lehericey	
2023	Junkyard Dog	Christiane Miralès	Jean-Baptiste Durand	
2023	Just the Two of Us	The lawyer	Valérie Donzelli	
2023	Avant l'effondrement	Fanny's mother	Benoît Volnais & Alice Zeniter	
2023	Toi non plus tu n'as rien vu	Dr. Krolen	Béatrice Pollet	
2025	The Safe House		Lionel Baier	In competition at the 75th Berlin International Film Festival
2026	Maigret and the Dead Lover	The princess	Pascal Bonitzer	
