= Les Grands Classiques de la littérature en bande dessinée =

2017–2018 French comic book series

Publication information
- Publisher: Glénat Éditions
- Publication date: January 2017 – November 2018
- No. of issues: 48

Creative team
- Written by: various
- Artist: various

Les Grands Classiques de la littérature en bande dessinée (lit. 'The Great Classics of Literature in Comics') is a French-language series of comic books published in 2017 and 2018 by Glénat Éditions in collaboration with Le Monde and France Bleu. It consists of 48 adaptations of literary classics. The series incorporates albums that had been made for two earlier classics series, published in 2007–2008 and 2010.

== Background ==
The publishing house Adonis published a series in 2007–2008 titled Romans de toujours (lit. 'Novels of All Times') which consisted of French-language comic books inspired by classic novels. In 2010, Glénat Éditions published the series Les Incontournables de la littérature en BD (lit. 'The Unmissables of Literature in Comics'), which reissued 8 of the 10 albums from the Adonis series and added 22 further titles.

Glénat collaborated with the French newspaper Le Monde and the radio network France Bleu to publish Les Grands Classiques de la littérature en bande dessinée in 2017 and 2018. This series consists of a total of 48 albums and includes the 30 that had been part of the 2010 series.

== Reception ==
Le Parisien wrote that despite the many different authors and artists, the collection all together "is of quality".

== List of albums ==
1. Le Tour du monde en quatre-vingts jours by Chrys Millien (12 January 2017) (Around the World in Eighty Days by Jules Verne)
2. L'Île au trésor by Christophe Lemoine and Jean-Marie Woehrel (26 January 2017) (Treasure Island by Robert Louis Stevenson)
3. Notre-Dame de Paris by Claude Carré and Jean-Marie Michaud (9 February 2017) (The Hunchback of Notre-Dame by Victor Hugo)
4. Robinson Crusoé by Christophe Lemoine and Jean-Christophe Vergne (23 February 2017) (Robinson Crusoe by Daniel Defoe)
5. Voyage au centre de la Terre by Curt Ridel and Frederik Garcia (9 March 2017) (Journey to the Center of the Earth by Jules Verne)
6. Le Livre de la jungle by Jean-Blaise Djian (23 March 2017) (The Jungle Book by Rudyard Kipling)
7. La Guerre des mondes by Philippe Chanoinat and Alain Zibel (6 April 2017) (The War of the Worlds by H. G. Wells)
8. Les Misérables, tome 1 by Daniel Bardet and Bernard Capo (20 April 2017) (Les Misérables, Victor Hugo)
9. Les Misérables, tome 2 by Daniel Bardet and Bernard Capo (4 May 2017) (Les Misérables by Victor Hugo)
10. L'Odyssée by Christophe Lemoine and Miguel de Lalor Imbira (18 May 2017) (The Odyssey by Homer)
11. Le Capitaine Fracasse by Philippe Chanoinat and Bruno Marivain (1 June 2017) (Captain Fracasse by Théophile Gautier)
12. Germinal, Tome 1 by Philippe Chanoinat and Jean-Michel Arroyo (15 June 2017) (Germinal by Émile Zola)
13. Germinal, Tome 2 by Philippe Chanoinat and Jean-Michel Arroyo (29 June 2017) (Germinal by Émile Zola)
14. Le Dernier des Mohicans by Marc Bourgne and Marcel Uderzo (13 July 2017) (The Last of the Mohicans by James Fenimore Cooper)
15. Oliver Twist by Philippe Chanoinat and David Cerqueira (27 July 2017) (Oliver Twist by Charles Dickens)
16. De la Terre à la Lune by Pierre Guilmard and Louisa Djouadi (10 August 2017) (From the Earth to the Moon by Jules Verne)
17. Autour de la Lune by Pierre Guilmard and Louisa Djouadi (24 August 2017) (Around the Moon by Jules Verne)
18. Don Quichotte by Philippe Chanoinat, Jean-Blaise Djian and David Pellet (7 September 2017) (Don Quixote by Miguel de Cervantes)
19. Le Monde Perdu, tome 1 by Anne Porot and Patrick Deubelbeiss (21 September 2017) (The Lost World by Arthur Conan Doyle)
20. Le Monde Perdu, tome 2 by Anne Porot and Patrick Deubelbeiss (5 October 2017) (The Lost World by Arthur Conan Doyle)
21. Tartarin de Tarascon by Pierre Guilmard and Louisa Djouadi (19 October 2017) (Tartarin of Tarascon by Alphonse Daudet)
22. Guerre et Paix, tome 1 by Frédéric Brémaud and Thomas Campi (2 November 2017) (War and Peace by Leo Tolstoy)
23. Guerre et Paix, tome 2 by Frédéric Brémaud and Thomas Campi (16 November 2017) (War and Peace by Leo Tolstoy)
24. Le conte de Noël by Patrice Buendia and Jean-Marc Stalner (30 November 2017) (A Christmas Carol by Charles Dickens)
25. Le Rouge et le Noir, tome 1 by Jean-Blaise Djian and Toni Fejzula (14 December 2017) (The Red and the Black by Stendhal)
26. Le Rouge et le Noir, tome 2 by Jean-Blaise Djian and Toni Fejzula (28 December 2017) (The Red and the Black by Stendhal)
27. Michel Strogoff by Frédéric Brémaud and Daniele Caluri (11 January 2018) (Michael Strogoff by Jules Verne)
28. Les Contes des Mille et une Nuits by Daniel Bardet and Nawa (25 January 2018) (One Thousand and One Nights)
29. Madame Bovary by Daniel Bardet and Michel Janvier (8 February 2018) (Madame Bovary by Gustave Flaubert)
30. Quo Vadis ? by Patrice Buendia and CAFU (22 February 2018) (Quo Vadis by Henryk Sienkiewicz)
31. L'Homme invisible, tome 1 by Dobbs and Christophe Regnault (8 March 2018) (The Invisible Man by H. G. Wells)
32. L'Homme invisible, tome 2 by Dobbs and Christophe Regnault (22 March 2018) (The Invisible Man by H. G. Wells)
33. Croc-Blanc by Caterina Mognato and Walter Venturi (5 April 2018) (White Fang by Jack London)
34. 20 000 lieues sous les mers by Fabrizio Lo Bianco and Francesco Lo Storto (19 April 2018) (Twenty Thousand Leagues Under the Seas by Jules Verne)
35. Sandokan et le tigre de Mompracem by Stefano Enna and Nico Tamburo (3 May 2018) (The Tigers of Mompracem by Emilio Salgari)
36. Les Trois Mousquetaires by Caterina Mognato and Andres José Mossa (17 May 2018) (The Three Musketeers by Alexandre Dumas)
37. Ivanhoé by Stefano Enna and Stefano Garau (31 May 2018) (Ivanhoe by Walter Scott)
38. Les aventures de Tom Sawyer by Caterina Mognato and Danilo Loizedda (14 June 2018) (The Adventures of Tom Sawyer by Mark Twain)
39. L'Île du docteur Moreau by Dobbs and Fabrizio Fiorentino (28 June 2018) (The Island of Doctor Moreau by H. G. Wells)
40. Agaguk by Jean-Blaise Djian and Yvon Roy (12 July 2018) (Agaguk by Yves Thériault)
41. Poil de Carotte by Christophe Lemoine and Cécile (26 July 2018) (Poil de carotte by Jules Renard)
42. La Guerre des boutons by Christophe Lemoine and Cécile (9 August 2018) (War of the Buttons by Louis Pergaud)
43. La Machine à explorer le temps by Dobbs and Mathieu Moreau (23 August 2018) (The Time Machine by H. G. Wells)
44. Jacquou le Croquant by Christophe Lemoine and Cécile (6 September 2018) (Jacquou the Rebel by Eugène Le Roy)
45. Les Malheurs de Sophie by Maxe L'Hermenier and Manboou (20 September 2018) (Sophie's Misfortunes by the Countess of Ségur)
46. Les Petites Filles modèles by Maxe L'Hermenier and Manboou (4 October 2018) (Good Little Girls by the Countess of Ségur)
47. Alice au pays des merveilles, tome 1 by David Chauvel and Xavier Collette (18 October 2018) (Alice's Adventures in Wonderland by Lewis Carroll)
48. Alice au pays des merveilles, tome 2 by David Chauvel and Xavier Collette (2 November 2018) (Alice's Adventures in Wonderland by Lewis Carroll)

== See also ==
- Classics Illustrated
- Marvel Classics Comics
- PAICO Classics
- Graphic Classics
- Classical Comics
- Marvel Illustrated
