= Guillaume Dustan =

French writer (1965–2005)

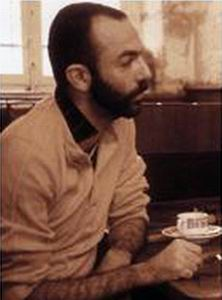
Guillaume Dustan

Guillaume Dustan (28 November 1965 – 3 October 2005) was a French writer. Dustan's 1998 novel, In My Room, brought him notoriety for his use of autofiction and depiction of gay glamour and romance in mid-1990s Paris. He was openly gay.

== Early life and education ==
Dustan was born William Baranès in Paris in 1965. He graduated from the École nationale d'administration and worked as an administrative judge before turning to writing. He used the pen name Guillaume Dustan from 1995 onwards.

== Work ==
Dustan's first novel, Dans ma chambre (In My Room) (1996), brought him fame in France for his portrayal of gay life in Paris celebrated for its sensual pleasures and haunted by the AIDS crisis. He edited Le Rayon Gay, a collection of books, for Balland. He was also a short film producer, and the films he produced include Nous and Back.

His book Nicolas Pages (1999) won the Prix de Flore.

In 2004, Dustan acted in the film Process written & directed by C. S. Leigh, as the hotel check-in employee.

Dustan's writing has been compared to Renaud Camus, Marguerite Duras, Hervé Guibert, Louis-Ferdinand Celine's Journey to the End of the Night, Eugene O'Neill's Long Day's Journey into Night, and Bret Easton Ellis. Critic Bruce Hainley writes that Dustan celebrated Duras for her liberating sense of abjection and "alcoholizations of the first person", including her “bad French, her badly written books of the ’eighties and ’nineties”.

Dustan's first three novels, In My Room, I'm Going Out Tonight, and Stronger Than Me, published in France between 1996 and 1998, were re-released in English by Semiotext(e) in 2021. Edited by Thomas Clerc and translated by Daniel Maroun, the novels follow the narrator's sexual journeys in Paris.

Dustan was a proponent of bareback sex and disagreed strongly with ACT UP.

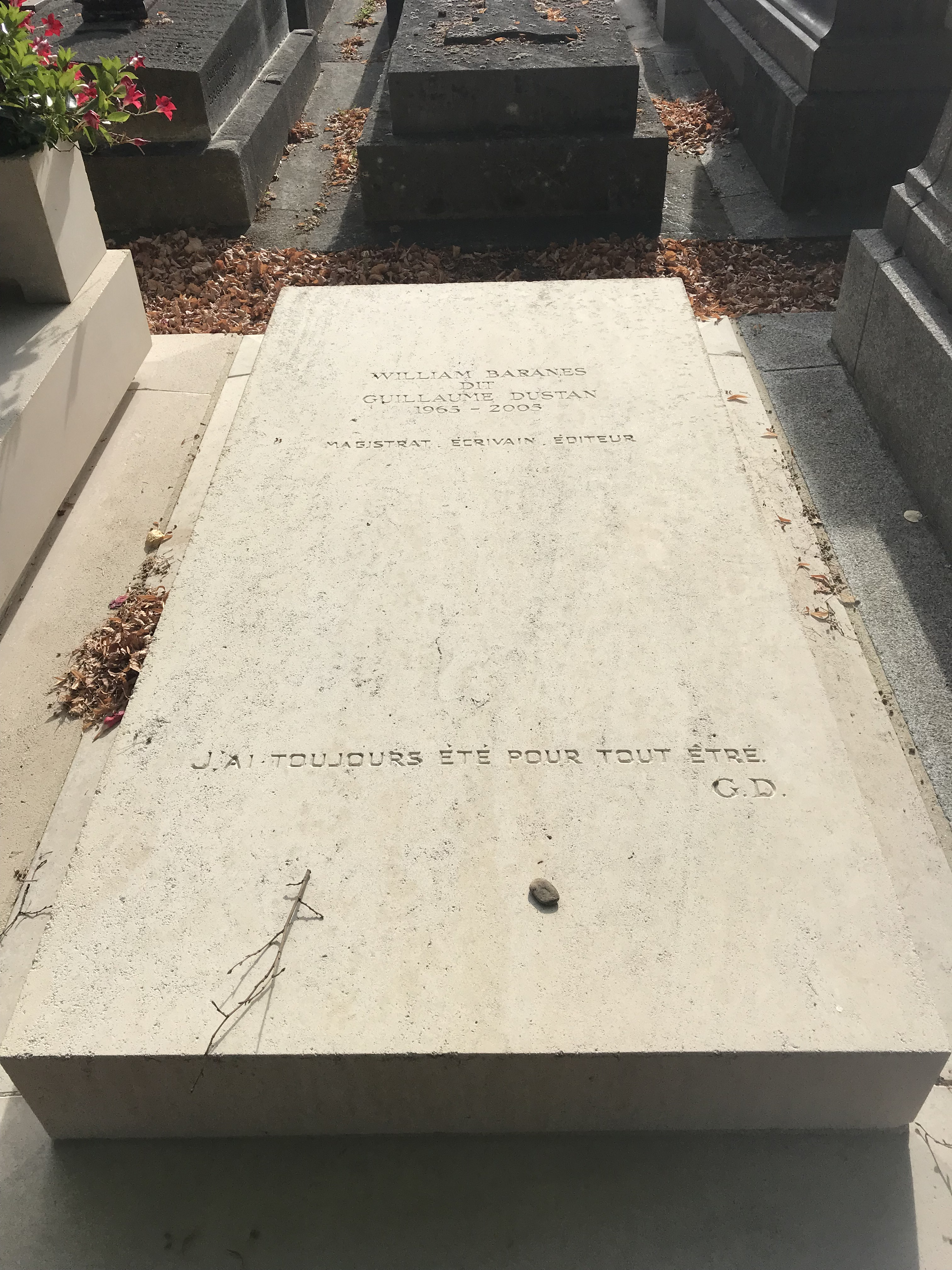
Grave of Guillaume Dustan

== Death ==
Dustan died of an accidental drug overdose on 3 October 2005. He is buried in Montparnasse Cemetery (division 29).

== Works ==
- Dans ma chambre, 1996 (translated as In My Room, 1998)
- Je sors ce soir, 1997
- Plus fort que moi, 1997
- Nicolas Pages, 1999
- Génie divin, 2001
- LXIR, 2002
- Dernier roman, 2004
- Premier essai, 2005
