= Sophie's Misfortunes (1946 film) =

1946 film

- Directed by: Jacqueline Audry
- Written by: Pierre Laroche; Colette Audry
- Based on: Sophie's Misfortunes by Countess of Ségur
- Produced by: Jacques Panhaleux; Adrien Remaugé; Hubert Vincent-Bréchignac
- Starring: Madeleine Rousset; Marguerite Moreno; Michel Auclair
- Cinematography: Jean Isnard
- Edited by: Émilienne Nelissen
- Music by: Pierre Sancan
- Production company: Pathé
- Distributed by: Pathé
- Release date: 3 April 1946
- Running time: 95 minutes
- Country: France
- Language: French

Sophie's Misfortunes (French: Les Malheurs de Sophie) is a 1946 French comedy drama film directed by Jacqueline Audry and starring Madeleine Rousset, Marguerite Moreno and Michel Auclair. The film is based on the novel of the same name by the Countess of Ségur.

It was shot at the Victorine Studios in Nice. The film's sets were designed by the art directors Alexandre Trauner and Marcel Magniez.

== Cast ==
- Madeleine Rousset as Sophie de Réan jeune fille
- Marguerite Moreno as Mademoiselle
- Michel Auclair as Paul d'Auber
- Colette Darfeuil as La révolutionnaire
- André Alerme as Le préfet Hugon
- Jean Daurand as Antoine Blaise
- Berteron
- René Bourbon
- José Conrad as Sophie de Réan enfant
- Paul Dagan as Le prêtre
- Liane Daydé as Madeleine
- Andrée de Chauveron as La préfète Hugon
- Robert Demorget as Antoine Blaise enfant
- Arlette du Sire
- Serge Emrich as Paul d'Auber enfant
- Paul Faivre as Le contrôleur
- Ghislaine Fenoglio as Camille
- Gautier-Sylla
- Micheline Gilbert
- Marianne Hardy as Madame d'Auber
- Lisette Jambel
- Pierre Labry
- Yolande Laffon as Madame de Réan
- Pierre Magnier
- Renaud Mary as Armand Hugon
- Yvette Maurech
- Geneviève Morel as La bonne de Sophie
- Noëlle Norman as Madame de Fleurville
- Simone Ribaut
- Paula Régnier
- Jean Témerson as Le policier Moucheron
- Jany Vallières

== Bibliography ==
- Tim Palmer & Charlie Michael. Directory of World Cinema: France. Intellect Books, 2013.
