= Will It Snow for Christmas? (film) =

- Film poster
- Y aura-t-il de la neige à Noël?
- Directed by: Sandrine Veysset
- Written by: Sandrine Veysset; Antoinette de Robien
- Produced by: Humbert Balsan
- Starring: Dominique Reymond; Daniel Duval
- Cinematography: Hélène Louvart
- Edited by: Nelly Quettier
- Music by: Henri Ancilotti
- Production company: Ognon Pictures
- Distributed by: Pyramide Distribution
- Release dates: September 9, 1996 (TIFF); December 18, 1996 (France)
- Running time: 90 minutes
- Country: France
- Language: French
- Budget: €1.2 million
- Box office: $364,000

Will It Snow for Christmas? (original title: Y aura-t-il de la neige à Noël?) is a 1996 French drama film directed by Sandrine Veysset and produced by Humbert Balsan.

== Plot ==
In a modest market garden in the South of France, a woman raises her seven children alone. They all work hard alongside hired labour and are exploited by the farm owner, who is her lover and the father of the children, an unfeeling and demanding man who lives on a nearby estate with his legally married wife. Through her unconditional love, the mother strives to preserve the world of her children. She would rather bring them up in the country than in the town, without resources.

== Cast ==
- Dominique Reymond as The mother
- Daniel Duval as The father
- Jessica Martinez as Jeanne
- Alexandre Roger as Bruno
- Xavier Colonna as Pierrot
- Fanny Rochetin as Marie
- Flavie Chimènes as Blandine
- Jérémy Chaix as Paul
- Guillaume Mathonnet as Remi
- Eric Huyard as Yvon
- Loys Cappatti as Bernard
- Marcel Guilloux-Delaunay as The teacher

== Accolades ==
Award / Film Festival	Category	Recipients and nominees	Result
César Awards	Best First Feature Film		Won
César Awards	Best Producer	Humbert Balsan	Nominated
Festival International du Film Francophone de Namur	CICAE Award - honorable mention	Sandrine Veysset	Won
Louis Delluc Prize	Best Film		Won
Paris Film Festival	Best Actress	Dominique Reymond	Won
Paris Film Festival	Special Jury Prize	Sandrine Veysset	Won
Vienna International Film Festival	FIPRESCI Prize		Won
