= Humbert Balsan =

French film producer

- Born: 21 August 1954; Arcachon, France
- Died: 10 February 2005 (aged 50); Paris, France
- Occupations: Film producer, chairman

Humbert Jean René Balsan (21 August 1954 – 10 February 2005) was a French film producer and chairman of the European Film Academy. He was known for securing financing and distribution for diverse and often challenging films.

In February 2005, Balsan was found dead in the offices of his production company, Ognon Pictures, in Paris. He was known to have suffered from depression, and died by suicide.

== Early life and career ==
Born in Arcachon in 1954, Balsan was part of France's upper class as a member of the de Wendel family, an industrial dynasty. He received a Jesuit education in Amiens and later studied economics in Paris. In 1973, Balsan's film career began when he was cast as Gawain in Robert Bresson's Lancelot of the Lake (1974).

While Balsan continued to act in small roles in friends' films (he played a pirate in Jacques Rivette's Noroit (1976)), his interest turned to production. He assisted Bresson on The Devil, Probably (1977) in 1976 and lensed a documentary portrait of French music teacher Nadia Boulanger the following year. In 2004 he was a member of the jury at the 26th Moscow International Film Festival.

== Role of producer ==
Balsan became a producer in 1978 with the filming of Pierre Kast's Le Soleil en Face (Face to the Sun) (1980). The same year, he acted in and co-produced Jean-Louis Trintignant's Le Maître-nageur (1979).

During the 1980s, Balsan lent not only his screen presence to Samuel Fuller for the then-expatriated director's French-language film Les Voleurs de la nuit (Thieves After Dark) (1984) but his Paris apartment as well. Fuller, who lived in France with his wife and daughter for 13 years beginning in 1982, would recount this period in his memoir (with Christa Lang Fuller) A Third Face: My Tale of Writing, Fighting, and Filmmaking (ISBN 0-375-40165-2).

As a patron of France's women filmmakers, Balsan facilitated a group that included Claire Denis, Sabine Franel, Brigitte Roüan, and Sandrine Veysset. He financed Roüan's Post Coitum, Animal Triste (1997) on the stipulation that the director, who like Balsan began her film career in front of the camera, play the film's lead role.

Balsan also came to be known as a champion of Arab cinema. He produced Elia Suleiman's Divine Intervention (2003), which in 2002 became the first Palestinian film to play at the Cannes Film Festival. It was nominated for the Palme d'Or and eventually won the Grand Jury Prize. In 2003 another film he produced, Le Cerf-Volant by Randa Chahal Sabag won a Silver Lion at the Venice Film Festival.

The producer returned to Cannes in 2004 with Youssef Chahine's Alexandria... New York (2004), his ninth film with the Egyptian director since 1985's Adieu, Bonaparte. Balsan also presented The Gate of Sun (2004), his second film with Yousry Nasrallah, who adapted the Elias Khoury novel. The 4 1/2-hour epic screened in the Official Selection and depicted the history of Palestine from 1943 to the present. Later that year, Balsan's production Le Grand Voyage (2004) won its director, Moroccan émigré Ismaël Ferroukhi, a best first feature prize at the 2004 Venice Film Festival.

However, the results of Balsan's efforts did not always please everyone. Balsan, who would typically enlist European television and business entities to co-finance Arab region-produced works, was cited by Al-Ahram Weekly's Hani Mustafa for being vulnerable to an investor-friendly system that tends to compromise the stories told in Middle-Eastern films.

Over the course of his career, Balsan played a role in the production of over 60 films, including several for filmmaking pair Merchant-Ivory. Among the last of his films to see a release are Denis's The Intruder (2004) and Lars von Trier's Manderlay (2006), which he co-produced.

At the time of his death, he had four films in production: Travaux by Brigitte Rouan, The Man from London directed by Bela Tarr, Un Ami Parfait by Francis Girod, and Sandrine Veysset’s Il Sera une Fois.

== Father of My Children ==
Father of My Children (French: Le père de mes enfants) is a 2009 French film by Mia Hansen-Løve inspired by the life of Balsan.

== Selected filmography ==
- Noroît (1976)
- Un balcon en forêt (1978)
- Adieu Bonaparte (1985)
- The Veiled Man (1987)
- Will It Snow for Christmas? (1996)
- Destiny (1998)
- After Sex (1998)
- Rembrandt (1999)
- Samia (2001)
- Silence, We're Rolling (2001)
- Martha...Martha (2002)
- Divine Intervention (2003)
- Process (2004)
- Alexandria... New York (2004)
- The Gate of Sun (2004)
