= In My Skin (film) =

2002 film by Marina de Van

- Directed by: Marina de Van
- Written by: Marina de Van
- Produced by: Laurence Farenc
- Starring: Marina de Van; Laurent Lucas
- Cinematography: Pierre Barougier
- Edited by: Mike Fromentin
- Music by: Esbjorn Svensson
- Release date: December 4, 2002 (France)
- Running time: 93 minutes
- Country: France
- Language: French

In My Skin (French: Dans ma peau) is a 2002 New French Extremity horror film written by, directed by, and starring Marina de Van. It details the downward mental spiral of Esther, a woman (played by de Van) who engages in increasingly destructive acts of self-mutilation following an accident that injures her leg at a party.

== Plot ==
One night, whilst attending a house party with colleagues, Esther (Marina de Van), a marketing professional in Paris, hurts her leg in the backyard on some industrial supplies. Alone when it happens, she does not even realize she has been hurt until much later, when she briefly inspects the injury in an upstairs bathroom. After the party, Esther visits a doctor (Adrian de Van) who patches her up and wonders why she did not initially feel the injury. Esther wonders too, but seems unconcerned about any cosmetic damage.

The next day, while taking a bath, Esther becomes fascinated by the folds of skin around her thigh. Her boyfriend, Vincent (Laurent Lucas), finds out about her injury and also becomes concerned about how she did not feel the injury. Vincent decides to test if Esther can feel anything by lightly touching her arm when she is not looking. She reacts to it normally, but they soon begin to fight before making up quickly.

At work, Esther impulsively runs into a filing closet and proceeds to cut herself further with a piece of metal. Afterwards, Esther candidly reveals to her friend Sandrine (Léa Drucker) that she has just cut herself, only to laugh it off. Sandrine asks Esther to stay over at her place for the night. There, as Esther is taking a shower, Sandrine sees the cuts Esther made to her leg. Esther is indifferent to Sandrine's concerns. Later, when they talk about work, Sandrine expresses a desire to move up in the company where they work.

The next day, Esther informs Sandrine she has just been promoted. Esther later tells Vincent about Sandrine's jealousy, but he is more upset about the new injuries to her leg. Esther asks him to stop questioning her about it. He reluctantly complies and they talk about moving in together. Later, Esther attends a dinner with her supervisor and some important clients. During the meal, Esther's arm moves of its own accord and eventually detaches itself from her body. She begins to stab at it with her steak-knife. Esther soon excuses herself from the table, taking the knife with her, and goes to further cut her arm and start to gnaw at it.

Esther checks herself into a hotel and proceeds to cut and chew at her hands and thighs, leaving large bite marks. She intentionally crashes her car in the woods to explain her injuries. Vincent meets her in the ambulance, inspecting her cuts and becomes suspicious. Later, at home, Vincent talks to Esther about places they can move into together after she heals. Meanwhile, her supervisor berates her for her behavior at the dinner. While walking to work the next day, Esther purchases a camera and a new knife. She goes to another hotel and begins to cut at her flesh again, including her face.

Esther inquires to a pharmacist about preserving a piece of her skin that she cut out. Back at her hotel room, she calls her work to apologize for her unexplained absence. She also leaves a phone message for Vincent telling him that she will not be home that night. The next morning, she wakes up, gets dressed and inspects the now-shriveled piece of skin. Esther places it in her bra and quickly leaves the room. A subsequent shot shows Esther still lying on the bed, staring vacantly into the camera. The shot fades to black.

== Cast ==
- Marina de Van as Esther
- Laurent Lucas as Vincent
- Léa Drucker as Sandrine
- Thibault de Montalembert as Daniel
- Dominique Reymond as The client
- Bernard Alane as The client
- Marc Rioufol as Henri
- François Lamotte as Pierre
- Adrien de Van as L'interne
- Alain Rimoux as Le pharmacien

== Reception ==
Critical reception for In My Skin was generally positive. The film holds a rating of 68 out of 100 on Metacritic based on 18 reviews, indicating "generally favorable reviews". The movie also holds a "fresh" approval rating of 66% on Rotten Tomatoes based on 44 reviews, with an average rating of 6.40/10. Stephen Holden of The New York Times called it "as unrelenting an exploration of isolation and dissociation, as Roman Polanski's Repulsion." Albert Nowicki of Movies Room ranked it among the fifteen best overlooked 21st century indie films.

== Legacy ==
In 2022, the film played at Fantasia International Film Festival to mark its 20th anniversary. The same year, the Museum of Modern Art showed it as part of its Messaging the Monstrous: Body Horror film series.

In promotion of In My Skin screening at MoMA, critic Elizabeth Horkley wrote of its contemporary relevance: "Far from a product of Munchausen's syndrome, Esther's need to self harm seems to stem from a desire to be the sole caretaker—and decision maker—for her body. The parallels to issues of bodily autonomy are explicit."

== Sources ==
- Brinkema, Eugenie. (2009) ‘To cut, to split, to touch, to eat, as of a body or a text’, Angelaki: Journal of the Theoretical Humanities, 14(3), pp. 131–145. Available at: https://doi.org/10.1080/09697250903407658.
- Chareyron, Romain. (2013) ‘Horror and the Body: Understanding the Reworking of the Genre in Marina de Van’s Dans ma peau/In my Skin (2001)’, Imaginations, 4(1). Available at: https://doi.org/10.17742/image.scandal.4-1.9.
- Coulthard, Lisa. and Birks, Chelsea. (2016) ‘Desublimating monstrous desire: the horror of gender in new extremist cinema’, Journal of Gender Studies, 25(4), pp. 461–476. Available at: https://doi.org/10.1080/09589236.2015.1011100.
- Hainge, Greg. (2012) ‘A full face bright red money shot: Incision, wounding and film spectatorship in Marina de Van’s Dans ma peau’, Continuum, 26(4), pp. 565–577. Available at: https://doi.org/10.1080/10304312.2012.698036.
- Lowenstein, Adam. (2015) ‘Feminine Horror: The Embodied Surrealism of In My Skin’, in B.K. Grant (ed.) The dread of difference: gender and the horror film, pp. 470–487.
- Palmer, Tim. (2007) ‘Under your skin: Marina de Van and the contemporary French cinéma du corps’, Studies in French Cinema, 6(3), pp. 171–181. Available at: https://doi.org/10.1386/sfci.6.3.171_1.
- Palmer, Tim. (2010) ‘Don’t Look Back; An Interview with Marina de Van’, The French Review, 83(5), pp. 96–103.
- Tarr, Carrie. (2006) ‘Director’s Cuts: The Aesthetics of Self-Harming in Marina de Van’s Dans ma peau’, Nottingham French Studies. Edited by G. Rye and C. Tarr, 45(3), pp. 78–91.
- Tarr, Carrie. (2010) ‘Mutilating and Mutilated Bodies: Women’s Takes on “Extreme” French Cinema’, in F. Laviosa (ed.) Visions of struggle in women’s filmmaking in the Mediterranean. 1st ed. New York, NY: Palgrave Macmillan, pp. 63–80.
