= Roberto Succo =

Italian serial killer

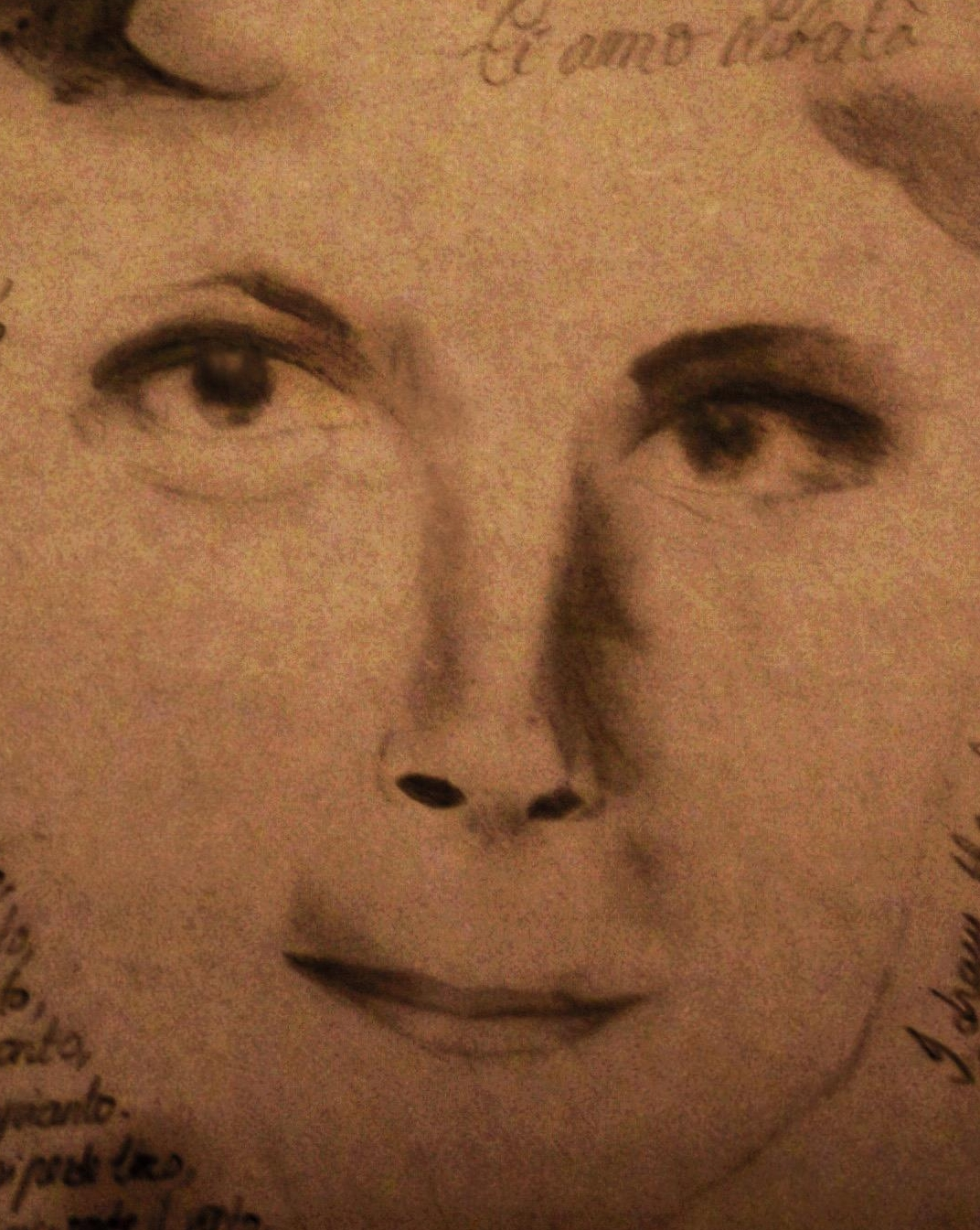
- Born: 3 April 1962; Mestre, Venice, Italy
- Died: 23 May 1988 (aged 26); Vicenza, Italy
- Cause of death: Suicide
- Other names: "The Monster of Mestre" "The Killer with the Eyes of Ice" "The Full Moon Assassin" "The Cherubino Nero"; Roberto Kurt
- Conviction: Murder
- Penalty: Never tried

Details
- Victims: 7
- Span of crimes: 1981–1988
- Country: Italy, France
- Date apprehended: 28 February 1988

Roberto Succo (3 April 1962 – 23 May 1988) was an Italian serial killer who committed several murders and other violent crimes mostly in Italy and France in the 1980s.

== Murders ==
Succo was born in Mestre. On 12 April 1981, he fatally stabbed his mother Maria 32 times, and his father, a police officer, who had refused to lend him their car. He hid their bodies in the bathtub covered in water and lime to delay the discovery of the murders and fled with his father's service pistol.

He then fled from Mestre, but an investigation into the murders of the Succo couple immediately connected them to the son, who was arrested two days later at the exit of a pizzeria in San Pietro al Natisone, not far from the border with Yugoslavia, after he had briefly returned to the crime scene.

After Succo was caught, he was judged mentally ill and sentenced to ten years in a psychiatric prison in Reggio Emilia. While serving his sentence, he was a model prisoner who studied geology at the University of Parma.

After serving five years of his sentence, on 15 May 1986, while on freedom privileges, Succo escaped from the psychiatric hospital. He evaded police and escaped to France by rail, using fake documents and changing his surname to "Kurt". In the next few years, he committed numerous crimes, including burglary, rape and murder. In France, he killed two women, a physician, and two police officers. He kidnapped, hijacked, and terrorized people in three European countries. He was considered public enemy number one by France, Italy, and Switzerland.

After being recognized by a student in Aix-les-Bains on 6 April, Succo returned to Italy. On 28 February 1988, he was caught in Mestre, his hometown. On 1 March 1988, in the course of an escape attempt, he fell from the roof of the Treviso prison.

He killed himself in his cell in Vicenza, in the "San Pius X" prison on 23 May 1988, suffocating himself with a plastic bag.

== Victims ==
- Maria and Nazario Succo, his parents, whom he killed in Mestre on 12 April 1981.
- Michel Morandin, inspector of the gendarmerie, killed in Toulon, Var on 2 February 1987. His colleague Claude Aiazzi was also injured.
- André Castillo, sergeant of the gendarmerie, killed in Tresserve, Savoie on 2 April 1987. His corpse was found in Veyrier-du-Lac, Haute-Savoie and his car was found in Lausanne, Switzerland.
- France Vu-Dinh, killed in Annecy, Haute-Savoie on 3 April 1987. The body has never been found.
- Michel Astoul, possibly killed in Sisteron, Alpes-de-Haute-Provence on 3 April 1987. The body was found on 28 October in Epersy, Savoie.
- Claudine Duchosal, raped and killed in Menthon-Saint-Bernard, Haute-Savoie on 6 October 1987.

== Later references ==
In 1988, Bernard-Marie Koltès wrote a play (Roberto Zucco) (Note: Koltès changed the spelling of his title character's name, as some early newspaper accounts had misspelled it, to underscore his lack of interest in "representational validity".) loosely based on Succo's life and crimes. French journalist Pascale Froment wrote a non-fiction account of Succo's crimes that appeared as Je te tue. Histoire vraie de Roberto Succo assassin sans raison in 1991, and it served as the basis for the 2001 film Roberto Succo directed by Cédric Kahn. French police officers criticized the film for allegedly glorifying Succo. Froment's book was reissued in 2001 under the title Roberto Succo.

== See also ==
- List of French serial killers
