= See You at Regis Debray =

- Film poster
- Directed by: C.S. Leigh
- Written by: C.S. Leigh
- Produced by: C.S. Leigh; Noriko Morimura
- Starring: Lars Eidinger
- Cinematography: Giorgos Arvanitis
- Edited by: C.S. Leigh
- Music by: Ryoji Ikeda
- Production company: Museumfilm
- Release date: 17 September 2005
- Running time: 71 minutes
- Country: United Kingdom

See You at Regis Debray is a 2005 film written and directed by C.S. Leigh and starring Lars Eidinger as the film's only character. Set in 1969, the film sees Andreas Baader hiding in Régis Debray's (who was imprisoned in Bolivia at the time) apartment in Paris. It contains only ten scenes. The film features an original score by Japanese experimental musician Ryoji Ikeda. It also features Leonard Cohen's song "Hey, That's No Way to Say Goodbye".
