= Marie Curie, une femme sur le front =

- Written by: Alain Brunard, Marie-Noëlle Himbert, Yann Le Gal
- Directed by: Alain Brunard
- Countries of origin: France, Belgium
- Original language: French

Production
- Cinematography: Tony Malamatenios
- Editor: Damien Keyeux
- Running time: 90 minutes
- Production company: Capa Drama
- Budget: 1 300 000 €

Original release
- Network: RTBF
- Release: 25 April 2014
- Network: France 2
- Release: 11 November 2014

Marie Curie, une femme sur le front (English: Marie Curie, a woman on the front) is a Franco-Belgian drama historical television film directed by Alain Brunard and starring Dominique Reymond. It was broadcast on April 25, 2014 on RTBF and November 11, 2014 on France 2.

The fictional scenes are interspersed with many sequences from filmed archives including several sequences at the end of the movie where Marie Curie herself appears.

== Synopsis ==
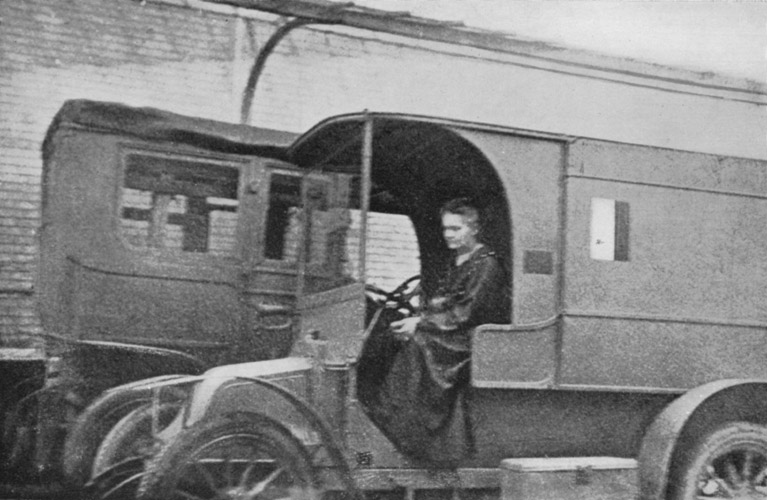
Marie Curie driving a "Little Curie" in 1915

Marie Curie, Nobel laureate in physics and chemistry, was director of the Radium Institute when World War I broke out in 1914. She equipped the first van with X-ray equipment and travelled to the site of the Battle of the Marne. The field hospital where she works became notable for the lower number of deaths recorded. In addition to the help of Doctor Claudius Regaud, a colleague who worked on the treatment of cancer through radiotherapy, Marie Curie was supported by her 17-year-old daughter, Irène. Curie quickly equipped other vehicles, nicknamed “the Petit Curies (Little Curies)” by the soldiers. Moving across the different battle fronts, her work became recognised and radiography, which until then was mainly an amusement for the public, became a precious aid for medicine.

== Cast ==
- Dominique Reymond as Marie Curie
- Fanny Dumont as Irène Curie
- Fabio Zenoni as Pierre Curie
- Epona Guillaume as Ève Curie
- Laurent Bateau as Claudius Regaud
- Olivier Bonjour as Wilhelm Röntgen
- Jean-Luc Couchard as head surgeon
- Patrick Descamps as Louis Ragot
- Guillaume Dolmans as Justin Godart
- Steve Driesen as surgeon at the hotel
- Éric Godon as president Poincaré
- Élie Lison as old doctor
- Corentin Lobet as soldier Brugalin
- Damien Marchal
- Olivier Massart as Émile Roux
- Benoît Strulus as Antoine Lacassagne
- Raphaëlle Bruneau as nurse

== Awards ==
The movie was featured in the Luchon TV Festival and was awarded the Audience Award for Best TV Movie, while Dominique Reymond was awarded the Best Actress Award.
