= Hop-o'-My-Thumb (film) =

2011 French film

- Directed by: Marina de Van
- Written by: Bertrand Santini; Marina de Van
- Starring: Ilian Calabert; Denis Lavant
- Cinematography: Vincent Mathias
- Edited by: Mike Fromentin
- Music by: Alexei Aigui
- Release date: 2011
- Country: France
- Language: French

Hop-o'-My-Thumb (French: Le Petit Poucet) is a 2011 French fantasy drama film co-written and directed by Marina de Van. It is based on the Charles Perrault's fairy tale of the same name.

The film premiered at the 68th edition of the Venice Film Festival, in the Horizons competition.

== Cast ==
- Ilian Calabert as Hop-o'-My-Thumb
- Denis Lavant as the Ogre
- Adrien de Van as the father
- Rachel Arditi as the mother
- Valérie Dashwood as the Ogre's wife
- Raphaël Bouvet as Hop-o'-My-Thumb's brother
- Orfeo Campanella as Hop-o'-My-Thumb's brother

== Production ==
Principal photography started in November 2010.
