= Process (film) =

French film

- Film poster
- Directed by: C. S. Leigh
- Written by: C. S. Leigh
- Produced by: Humbert Balsan; Mark Westaway
- Starring: Béatrice Dalle; Guillaume Depardieu
- Cinematography: Giorgos Arvanitis
- Edited by: Luc Barnier
- Music by: John Cale
- Release date: 26 May 2004
- Running time: 93 minutes
- Country: France
- Language: French

Process is a 2004 French film written and directed by C.S. Leigh. The film follows an actress (portrayed by Béatrice Dalle) as she is trying to commit suicide. It also features Guillaume Depardieu, Julia Faure, Daniel Duval, Leos Carax among others. The film was produced by Humbert Balsan and Mark Westaway and features an original score composed by Welsh musician John Cale. It also features "That's Entertainment", a song by English band The Jam.

== Cast ==
- Béatrice Dalle as The actress
- Guillaume Depardieu as The husband
- Julia Faure as The other actress
- Daniel Duval as The lover
- Leos Carax as The doctor
- Dominique Reymond as The metro lady
- Lolita Chammah as The maid

== Reception ==
In a positive review for Variety, Leslie Felperin called it "one of the most adventurous works screened at this year’s [2004] Berlinale." Writing for The Guardian, critic Peter Bradshaw gave it two out of five stars.
