= Sophie's Misfortunes =

Novel by the Countess of Ségur

- Author: Countess of Ségur
- Original title: Les Malheurs de Sophie
- Language: French
- Genre: Children's fiction
- Publisher: Hachette
- Publication date: 1858
- Publication place: France
- Followed by: Good Little Girls

Sophie's Misfortunes (French: Les Malheurs de Sophie) is a children's book written by the Countess of Ségur. The book was published in 1858 by the publisher Hachette. The illustrations were by Horace Castelli, a French artist. This is the first book of a trilogy; its sequels are Good Little Girls (1858) and The Holidays (1859).

== Plot ==
The story is set in a castle in the French countryside, during the Second French Empire. Sophie is a mischievous girl who lives with her parents, Monsieur and Madame de Réan.

== Summary ==
Sophie de Réan is a wealthy French girl who lives with her affectionate but firm parents at the Château de Réan. Intelligent, imaginative and impulsive, she is constantly seized by "ideas", which invariably lead to disaster. Although sincerely affectionate and usually remorseful afterwards, she repeatedly ignores the advice of her mother, Madame de Réan, and learns through a succession of painful experiences.

The novel consists of a series of largely independent episodes illustrating Sophie's curiosity, selfishness and lack of foresight. Her experiments include ruining a wax doll through increasingly elaborate attempts to improve it, destroying her mother's pet fish, mistreating insects and other animals, cutting off her eyebrows, stealing food, inventing implausible lies, and repeatedly causing the deaths of pets through thoughtlessness. Her frequent companion is her cousin Paul d'Auber, whose honesty and courage provide a moral contrast to Sophie's impulsiveness.

Although Sophie gradually becomes more truthful and compassionate, her progress is inconsistent, and many faults recur despite earlier resolutions. Madame de Réan consistently combines affection with firm discipline, while Paul's friendship and good example encourage Sophie's better instincts.

The book concludes with Sophie's family sailing with Paul's family to America to settle the estate of the wealthy Monsieur Fichini, whose death has left a substantial inheritance. This voyage sets up the sequel, Good Little Girls. Set some years later, Sophie has lost her original family and is in the "care" of her cruel stepmother, Madame Fichini.

== Legacy ==
The success of Sophie's Misfortunes has been constant through the years and still goes on today; the book has been republished many times. Overseas, as well, it has been very successful. Vladimir Nabokov alluded to it in his novel Ada (1969), making up a novel called Sophie's Sophisms [Les Sophismes de Sophie] by a so-called "Miss Stopchin", as well Les Malheurs de Swann, a title which combines Countess of Ségur and Marcel Proust. In the United Kingdom, the book was used as reference material to teach young girls French translation (boys would be trained using L'Histoire d'un conscrit de 1813, written by Erckmann-Chatrian).

== Main characters ==
- Sophie de Réan
- Monsieur and Madame de Réan, Sophie's parents
- Paul d'Auber, Sophie's cousin
- Camille and Madeleine de Fleurville, Sophie's friends

== Adaptations ==
=== Cinema and television ===
The book has inspired numerous film and television adaptations, including:

- Sophie's Misfortunes (1946), by Jacqueline Audry.
- Sophie's Misfortunes (1979), by Jean-Claude Brialy.
- Sophie's Misfortunes (2016), by Christophe Honoré.

=== Music ===
- In 1935, French composer Jean Françaix wrote a ballet called Les Malheurs de Sophie (32 minutes, published by Schott).
- Les Bonheurs de Sophie, piano sheet music by Chantal Auber, La Pléiade, Préparatoire 1.
- "Les Malheurs de Sophie", sung by Chantal Goya, a song from the movie made by Jean-Claude Brialy.
- Les Malheurs de Sophie (2011), a musical by Virginie Aguzzoli.

=== Animation ===
Les Malheurs de Sophie (1998) is the only animated adaptation of Sophie's Misfortune and has enjoyed a cult success in the French-speaking world.

Created by Bernard Deyriès with voices by

- Julie Legout : Sophie de Réan
- Barbara Tissier : Adult Sophie de Réan adulte (episode 26)
- Gwenaël Sommier : Paul d'Aubert (episodes 1 to 8)
- Mathieu Laurent : Paul d'Aubert (episodes 21 to 26)
- Alexandre Gillet : Adult Paul d'Aubert (episode 26)
- Mélanie Laurent : Camille de Fleurville
- Malvina Germain : Adult Madeleine de Fleurville (episode 26) / Élisa
- Kelly Marot : Marguerite de Rosbourg
- Valérie Siclay : Adult Marguerite de Rosbourg (episode 26) / Lucie / Madame Chéneau
- Sylvie Feit : Léon de Rugès / Mina
- Donald Reignoux : Jean de Rugès
- Tony Marot : Adult Jean de Rugès (episode 26)
- Céline Monsarrat : Madame de Réan
- Daniel Gall : Monsieur Henry Louis Hubert de Réan / Lambert / André / Nicaise / Doctor Forestier (episode 20) / Lawyer of Madame de Fleurville (episode 25)
- Monique Thierry : Madame Fedora Marie Alexandrine Fichini
- Claire Guyot : Madame d'Aubert / Miss Albion
- Anne Jolivet : Madame de Fleurville
- Rafaèle Moutier : Madame de Rosbourg
- Régis Reuilhac : Commander de Rosbourg
- Jean-Claude Robbe : Monsieur de Rugès
- David Lesser : Augustin
- Philippe Dumat : Gabriel / Doctor Forestier (episodes 4 & 11) / Doctor Alliotte / The priest (episode 10)
- Sarah Marot : Albertine Simonet (episode 17)
- Noémie Orphelin : Pauline de Rosbourg (episode 26)

The series was developed by Alya Animation and aired on France 3.

There are 26 episodes in total. It shows the titular character, Sophie's life from when she was a child to adulthood and the hardships throughout her life.

The series now has many different YouTube channels with all of the episodes with both French and English audio. The TV series also tells the stories of the sequel books ‘Good Little Girls’ and ‘The Holidays’, making it a full story of Sophie's life and a complete adaptation of the ‘Fleurville Trilogy’.

== Notes and references ==
- Ségur, S. (1889). Sophie's Troubles (English Translation). New York: P. J. Kenedy & Sons. (Internet Archive digital edition).
- Les Nouveaux Malheurs de Sophie, a novel by Valérie Dayre
- Les Malheurs de Sophie, audio version (in French)

.
