= West Pier (play) =

1980s play by Bernard-Marie Koltès

West Pier (originally titled Quai ouest and known in German as Quay West) is a play by the French dramatist and writer Bernard-Marie Koltès written in 1983 and premiered in 1986. It was published in 1985. It represents, in one critic's view, "the poetry proper to the art of Koltès ... cold and pithy ... proceeding more from the wanderings of the characters than from their words".

A quote from Victor Hugo serves as one of several epitaphs to the text: "He stops to get his bearings. All of a sudden he looks at his feet. His feet have disappeared." (Il s'arrete pour s'orienter. Tout à coup, il regarde à ses pieds. Ses pieds ont disparu.). Others come from the Book of Genesis (6:13) and Burning Spear.

== Plot ==
There are eight characters.

- Maurice Koch, 60 years old; Monique Pons, 42.
- Cécile, 60; her daughter Claire, 14; her husband Rodolfe, 58; and their son Charles, 28.
- A boy about 22 with the surname Fak.
- An unnamed man about 30, whom Charles calls Abad a few times.

The setting, a derelict warehouse in an abandoned section of a port city, is a kind of character as well, both space and non-space, empty but real. Plot, wrote one critic, "was never Koltès's strength", yet he essayed a brief summation: "a suicidal financial wizard and his girlfriend, a homeless Latin American family and two creepy opportunists engage in a hellish but often funny battle in which everyone is both predator and prey", concluding with "a couple of spectacular murders that seem so natural they are cathartic". Another offers this precis: "The action tells the story of Maurice Koch, a businessman who jumps into a river after parting from his secretary Monique Pons. He is pulled out by Charles, whose relatives hope to gain from the rescue. The plot is based on exchange and trafficking and plays on the apprehension of the other and of oneself."

The characters come from opposing worlds and never should have met. Their face-to-face encounter forces the conflicts of the modern world to the fore: immigration, social displacement, poverty, the right to dignity. The director is challenged to present this chance meeting "at the crossroads of trivial and poetic" and needs "actors-monsters" with "an exceptional physical and vocal presence" to deliver Koltes' "splendid text", often in the long monologues typical of Koltes.

== Performances and reception ==
The play premiered at the Publiekstheater in Amsterdam early in 1986. It was next mounted in a production directed by Patrice Chéreau at the Théâtre Nanterre-Amandiers from 24 April to 29 June 1986. The Nanterre cast included María Casarès, Jean-Marc Thibault, Jean-Paul Roussillon, Catherine Hiégel, and Isaach de Bankolé.

West Pier was one of four plays by Koltes presented in a tribute festival in New York City in 2003. Those involved produced new translations because, they said, "limp British translations have stymied interest" in Koltes' work. A positive review in The New York Times said that "The cast gives these characters the entrancing energy of subtle maniacs" in the course of "a mordant, violently physical exploration of lost people searching for connections", saved by Koltes' "aptitude for dramatic confrontation". It praised the new translation used in 2003: "Koltès now sounds like Dante speaking in the voice of Sam Shepard". It concluded: "How often can you sit through two hours, count them 30 minutes and lament that they've ended?" (Note: The translation by Marion Schoevaert and Theresa Weber was completed in 1996 and revised in 2003.)

== Adaptations ==
Composer Régis Campo adapted the play for his second opera Quai Ouest in 2013–2014. The work received its first performance on 27 September 2014 at the Opéra national du Rhin directed by Kristian Frédric during the festival Musica à Strasbourg. It was repeated during the 2014–2015 season in a German translation at the Staatstheater Nürnberg. The thirty-scene libretto for the opera was adapted from the play by Kristian Frédric et Florence Doublet. Carolyn Sittig produced the German version of the libretto based on a translation of the French libretto by Simon Werle. On the basis of this opera, Campo was nominated for the award of composer of the year at the Victoires de la musique classique for 2015.
