= Sandrine Veysset =

French film director and screenwriter (born 1967)

- Born: 29 March 1967 (age 59); Avignon, France
- Occupations: Film director, screenwriter
- Years active: 1991–present
- Awards: César Award (1997)

Sandrine Veysset (born 29 March 1967) is a French film director and screenwriter.

== Life and career ==
Veysset was born in Avignon. She studied French literature until she dropped out of school to pursue filmmaking. A friend introduced her to Léos Carax and she was hired as his driver while he was shooting Les Amants du Pont-Neuf (The Lovers on the Bridge) (1991) in 1989. Her first real contact with cinema happened when she became an assistant to the art director of that film. The experience encouraged her to begin writing her first screenplay in 1991.

She directed from her first script in 1995 and the resulting film, Will It Snow for Christmas? (Y aura-t-il de la neige à Noël?) (1996), won her a César Award in 1997 for Best First Film.

Her third film, Martha...Martha (2001) opened the Directors' Fortnight at the 2001 Cannes Film Festival.

== Collaborators ==
Veysset worked with Ognon Pictures producer Humbert Balsan and camerawoman Hélène Louvart on all her films.

== Filmography ==
- Will It Snow for Christmas? (1996)
- Victor... Pendant qui'il est trop tard (1998)
- Martha...Martha (2001)
- Il sera une fois... (2006)
- L'Histoire d'une mère (2016)
