= Marina de Van =

French film director

- Born: 8 February 1971 (age 55); France
- Occupations: Film director, screenwriter, actress
- Years active: 1993–present

Marina de Van (French: [də van]; born 8 February 1971) is a French film director, screenwriter and actress. Her film, Don't Look Back, was screened out of competition at the 2009 Cannes Film Festival.

Her brother is Adrien de Van, he appeared with her in the 1998 film Sitcom playing her brother. In her directing debut In My Skin in 2002, he played an intern.

She studied in the directing department of La Fémis, from which she graduated in 1997.

== Selected filmography ==
- Bein Sous Tous Rapports (1996) (actress/writer/director)
- See the Sea (1997) (actress/writer)
- Sitcom (1998) (actress)
- Alias (1999) (writer/director)
- Psy Show (1999) (writer/director)
- Criminal Lovers (1999) (writer of additional material - poem "Bouche de Saïd")
- 8 Women (2002) (writer)
- In My Skin (2002) (writer/director)
- Made in Paris (2006) (actress)
- La clef (2007) (actress)
- La promenade (2007) (actress/writer/director)
- Don't Look Back (2009) (writer/director)
- Hop-o'-My-Thumb (2011) (director/collaborating writer)
- Dark Touch (2012) (writer/director)
- My Nudity Means Nothing (2019) (actress/writer/director)
- Continental Drift (South) (2022) (collaborating writer)
- Ozon: Remastered and Uncut (2022) (actress)
- The Black Widow (2023) (actress)
