= Jean-Christian Grinevald =

French stage director (1945–2023)

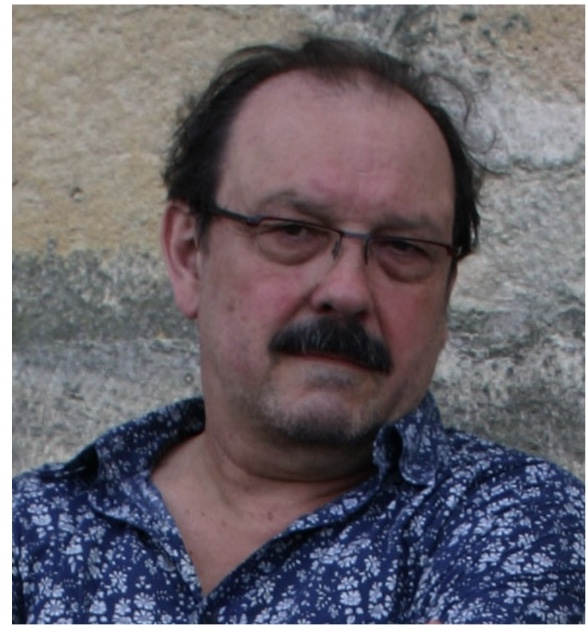
- Grinevald in 2017
- Born: 12 March 1945; Paris, France
- Died: 7 September 2023 (aged 78)
- Occupation: Stage director

Jean-Christian Grinevald (12 March 1945 – 7 September 2023) was a French stage director.

== Biography ==
Born in Paris on 12 March 1945, Grinevald held multiple degrees in theatre. He became a German teacher before becoming an assistant to stage director Patrice Chéreau, then Jacques Rosner, director of the Centre dramatique national Nord-Pas-de-Calais and the Conservatoire national supérieur d'art dramatique.

In 1975, Grinevald founded his theatre company, Théâtre Kobold, and produced and directed numerous shows. He directed the likes of Annie Girardot, Claude Piéplu, Didier Brice, Karin Viard, and Denis Lavant. He founded and directed the Théâtre-Marie-Stuart in Paris from 1977 to 1981 and put in great effort to make theatre a big business. He then directed the Théâtre de la Main d'Or from 1989 to 1999. In 1992, the theatre was awarded the Fauteuil d'or under his leadership.

Grinevald was a professor at the National School of Arts and Techniques of Theatre (ENSATT) from 1981 to 1998. He also taught in Quebec, Germany, China, and Poland, and he founded his own school, La Belle de Mai.

Jean-Christian Grinevald died on 7 September 2023, at the age of 78.

== Shows directed ==
- L’Azote (1967)
- Monsieur Leonidas aux prises avec la Réaction (1967)
- Les Horaces et les Curiaces (1974)
- La Famille (1975)
- Dreyfus (1975)
- Irène ou la Résurrection (1976)
- Feydeau-Farré-Loïk (1977)
- La maison d’en face (1977)
- Gotcha (1977)
- Vinci avait raison (1978–1979)
- Phèdre (1979–1980)
- Honorée par un petit monument (1980)
- Le bébé de monsieur Laurent (1980)
- Gotcha (1980)
- Le bouc (1981)
- Voici Solange, Paris ou ailleurs (1981)
- Pour l'amour de l'humanité (1981)
- Der Geizige (l’Avare) (1981)
- L’alpage (1982)
- L’épaule indifférente et la bouche malade (1982)
- Phèdre (1982)
- Hôtel de l’amour flou (1983)
- Mensch Meier (1983)
- Das Sparschwein (la Cagnotte) (1983)
- Ariakos (1984)
- Entrée libre (1985)
- Monsieur Vitrac (1985)
- Der Menschenfeind (le Misanthrope) (1985)
- La Ronde (1986)
- Sauvés (1986)
- Cabaret de Quat’sous (1987)
- Cabale (1987)
- Cinq pièces sur square (1988)
- Leonardo hat’s gewusst (1988)
- Nina, c’est autre chose (1988–1989)
- Paysages après la Tempête (1989)
- La Famille (1989)
- Petits extras (1990)
- L’alpage (1990)
- L’écume des jours (1991)
- Les caïmans sont des gens comme les autres (1991)
- Brecht, une biographie (1991)
- La noce chez les petits bourgeois (1992)
- Au cœur, la brûlure (1992)
- Une histoire de l’œil (1992)
- Après l’amour (1992)
- Aberration des étoiles fixes (1993)
- Le Misanthrope (1993)
- Le Rabelais (1994)
- Les Chutes du Zambèze (1995)
- Quartett (1995)
- Victor ou les enfants au pouvoir (1996)
- L’école des femmes (1997)
- Gotcha (1997)
- La Colonie (1997)
- Les Molières en chocolat (1997)
- Baal (1998)
- Le Rêve de Diderot (2001)
- Le songe d'une nuit d'été (2001)
- À l’Usage des dauphins (2002)
- Huître et demi (2005)
- Le Sabre de mon Père (2006)
