= C. S. Leigh =

- Born: Christian Leigh; 1964 (age 60–61)

C. S. Leigh (1964 – reported dead March, 2016) was a British-American film director based in London and Paris, who previously worked as a curator under the name Christian Leigh. From 1987 to 1993 he was a well known figure in the New York art world until he abruptly "disappeared". An exhibition about his career as a curator and the mystery of his disappearance took place in 2012. In 1998 he premiered his directing debut Sentimental Education under his own name Christian Leigh. His 2001 film Far from China starred singer and actress Marianne Faithfull and featured original music by Suede. His 2005 film See You at Regis Debray is about Andreas Baader. His last release was A Quiet American: Ralph Rucci & Paris, a documentary about fashion designer Ralph Rucci. Projection, starring Lars Eidinger and Yekaterina Golubeva, is currently in post-production.

Leigh's films are characterised by long takes (Giorgos Arvanitis is a frequent collaborator), minimal dialogue, 'extreme' content and references to art of all varieties. Welsh musician John Cale has composed music for two of his films: Process (2004) and American Widow (2009). Japanese sound artist Ryoji Ikeda composed music for his film See You at Regis Debray (2005).

== Reported death ==
Neil Thomas Ward eulogizes Leigh's death in an article on Medium, dated March 2018. He refers to cinematographer Joachim Høge receiving information about Leigh's demise in an email from photographer Laurence Ellis (who has documented his earlier dealings with Leigh): "A coroner had contacted Ellis in March 2016, seeking details about the recently deceased Leigh. The coroner had searched for Leigh's name online and landed upon Ellis's website first." Ward is cited by John A. Riley in a memorial piece on his blog.

== Filmography ==
- Sentimental Education (1998)
- Far from China (2001)
- Nude, Descending... (2002)
- Process (2004)
- See You at Regis Debray (2005)
- American Widow (2009)
- A Quiet American: Ralph Rucci & Paris (2012)
- Projection (in postproduction)
