= Good Little Girls (novel) =

1858 children's novel by the Countess of Ségur

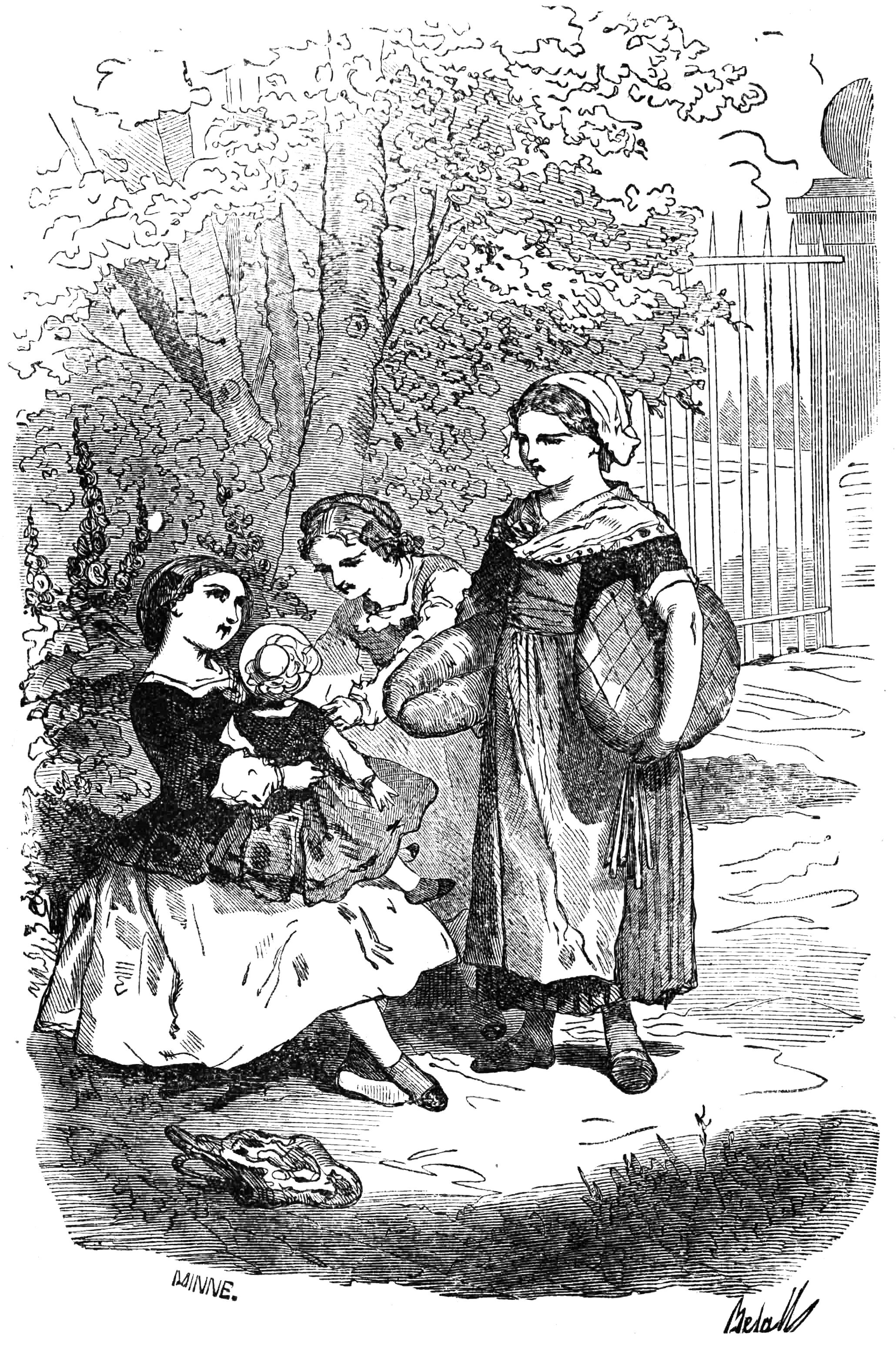

Les petites filles modèles (English: Good Little Girls) is a novel for children by the Countess of Ségur first published in May 1858. It is the second book of a trilogy (sometimes called the Fleurville Trilogy), with Sophie's Misfortunes (1858) and Les vacances (English: The Holidays) (1859). Hachette was still selling 20,000 copies of this novel at the beginning of the 21st century.

== Quote ==
In the introduction, the Countess of Ségur writes:

“My two little girls are no creation, they really exist : they are portraits; the proof of this lies in their imperfections. They have flaws, light shadows which emphasize the charm of their portraits and prove the existence of their models. Camille and Madeleine are a reality which can be confirmed by anyone who knows the author.”

The author's granddaughters were named Camille and Madeleine de Malaret. Their graves can be found in a little graveyard at Saint-Sernin-des-Rais, in Verfeil.

== Summary ==
Les petites filles modèles tells the story of a happy family, the family of Madame de Fleurville. Madame de Fleurville, who has been widowed for 6 years, receives Madame de Rosbourg, who has no news from her husband, lost at sea. But this novel is also the sequel to the adventures of Sophie, the heroine of Sophie’s Misfortunes. Sophie appears in the novel once the author has presented Camille and Madeleine de Fleurville.

The narrator is mostly interested in the children. The little girls go through a series of adventures from which they learn to distinguish good and evil; this is especially true of Marguerite de Rosbourg, the youngest, who has good intentions, but doesn't come up to the standards of Camille and Madeleine.

A new character arrives in the seventh chapter : Fédora Fichini, a woman who has become Sophie's stepmother. She is particularly cruel with Sophie, punishing and whipping her. Sophie, who has lost her parents, her uncle, aunt and cousin since Sophie’s Misfortunes, occasionally comes with her stepmother to play at the Fleurville mansion. Sophie is not "bad", but Camille and Madeleine have to be patient and understanding for there to remain a pleasant atmosphere. Marguerite, who is less mature, sometimes has trouble accepting Sophie, who is quick-tempered, vivacious and sometimes dishonest.

The three girls understand that Sophie's gluttony and her dishonesty are mainly caused by her fear of Madame Fichini, for whom "the whip is the best teacher” and “the only way to raise children”. As concerns Madame de Fleurville and Madame de Rosbourg, they both hate Madame Fichini, but show nothing of their distaste, to make sure that Sophie can keep coming to play with Camille, Madeleine and Marguerite. Once they have managed to convince Madame Fichini to leave her stepdaughter with them, Sophie makes great headway. Yet she will have to lose some of her various deep-seated flaws. “Dear Camille, I know that I will always stay bad; I will never be as good as you are”, she says in one of the chapters.

== Adaptations ==
Film

- 1952: Les Petites filles modèles, French movie (unfinished) by Éric Rohmer, with Josette Sinclair (Madame de Fleurville), Josée Doucet (Madame de Rosbourg) and Olga Baïdar-Poliakoff (Madame Fichini)

Literary

- 2010-2011: Les Nouvelles Petites Filles Modèles, a five-book series by Rosalind Elland-Goldsmith (Hachette Jeunesse)

Television

- 1997: Sophie's Misfortunes, a series relating the story told in the trilogy.

Erotic parody

- 1971: Good Little Girls, an erotic film by Jean-Claude Roy
- 1982: Good Little Girls, an erotic comic book by Georges Lévis, Jean-Claude Baboulin and Francis Leroi, published by Dominique Leroy.
