= Countess of Ségur =

French writer (1799–1874)

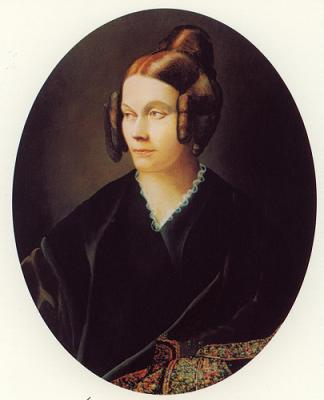
- Portrait by Louis Gaston Adrien de Ségur, c. 1840
- Born: Sofiya Feodorovna Rostopchina; 1 August 1799; Saint Petersburg, Russia
- Died: 9 February 1874 (aged 74); Paris, France
- Occupation: Writer
- Years active: 1856–1872

Signature
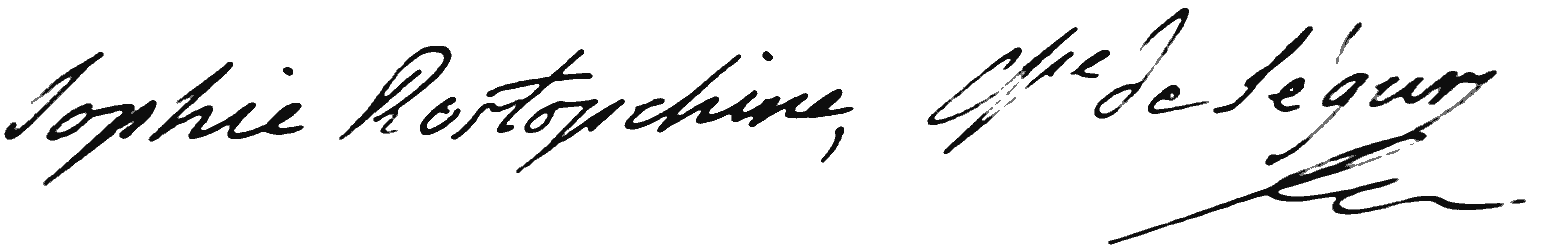

Sophie Rostopchine, Countess of Ségur, born Sofiya Feodorovna Rostopchina (Russian: Софья Фёдоровна Ростопчина; 1 August 1799 in Saint Petersburg – 8 February 1874 in Paris), was a French writer of Russian birth and origin. She is best known today for her novel Les Malheurs de Sophie (Sophie's misfortunes), intended for children.

== Life ==
Her father Count Fyodor Rostopchin was lieutenant-general and, later, Minister of Foreign Affairs for Russia. In 1812, he was governor of Moscow during the invasion of the Grande Armée under Napoleon I of France. While facts concerning the origin of the great fire of Moscow are disputed by historians, Sophie Rostopchine's father has been said by some to have organized (despite opposition from the wealthy property-owners in the city) the great fire which forced Napoleon to make a disastrous retreat.

In 1814 the Rostopchine family left Imperial Russia for exile, going first to the Duchy of Warsaw, then to the German Confederation and the Italian Peninsula and finally in 1817 to France under the Bourbon Restoration. In France, the father established a salon, and his wife and daughter converted to Roman Catholicism from Russian Orthodoxy.

It was in her father's salon that Sophie Rostopchine met Eugène Henri Raymond, Count of Ségur (Fresnes, Seine-et-Marne on 12 February 1798 – Château de Méry-sur-Oise 15 July 1869), whom she married on 13/14 July 1819. The marriage was largely an unhappy one: her husband was flighty, distant and poor (until being made a Peer of France in 1830), and his infrequent conjugal visits to their château des Nouettes (near L'Aigle, Orne) produced eight children, including Nathalie de Ségur and the father of the historian Pierre de Ségur (Eugène de Ségur is said to have called his wife "la mère Gigogne", or "Mother Gigogne" in reference to a theatre character of 1602, an enormous woman out of whose skirts a crowd of children appeared).

The Comtesse de Ségur wrote her first novel at the age of 58.

== Novels ==
The most recurrent theme in her novels was the corporal punishments (Un bon petit diable ; Le général Dourakine, Les malheurs de Sophie, Les petites filles modèles…), that is a direct reference to her miserable childhood with her mother. It marks a rupture with anterior models of literature for children, in comparison with Charles Perrault’s fairy tales or the novels of Madame of Aulnoy. In her novels, the punishment is very much realistic because of her crude descriptions. However, the use of corporal punishment is clearly condemned with the disapprobation of characters presented as moral models (Mmes de Fleurville and de Rosbourg in Les petites filles modèles), traumatizing the victims who were childrens and comforting them as their vices could be corrected through a strict education based on patience, trust, truth and forgiveness.

Many other aspects of her work described particularities that does not exist anymore or have fallen out of use: as the formal form of address to their parents but also the presence and statue of domestiques. Others are obsoletes: especially the medicals treatments as the excessive usage of bleeding, the cataplasms “saupoudrés de camphre” (Les petites filles modèles), water of fresh gumma, salty water against rabies, … The realism in the depiction of the everyday life and the amount of details gave to the Countess de Segur the surname “le Balzac” for children given by Marcelle Tinayre. Since the first years of publications until 2010, 29 million copies of her books were sold.

The novels of the Countess of Ségur were published from 1857 to 1872 in the "Bibliothèque rose illustrée" by the publishing house Hachette. They were collected together in 1990 under the title Œuvres de la comtesse de Ségur in the collection "Bouquins" (publisher: Robert Laffont), with three volumes reuniting a major part of her work (compiled and annotated by Claudine Beaussant, ISBN 978-2-221-05892-3 ISBN 978-2-221-05893-0 ISBN 978-2-221-05894-7).

Inspiration: The Countess of Segur has given names from people of her entourage, following her adage "Only write what you've seen".

Moral lessons: The heavily moralistic novels were influenced by the reading and corrections made by her eldest son, the prelate Louis-Gaston of Segur. The Just and the unfair were used to make the children understand what is the right path and how it is in the interest of all to be brave and without any bad intentions.

In the novels of the Countess of Segur, education is a decisive factor in the evolution of the individual. Bad influences and a repressive environment can lead children to be mean. Too much permissiveness and indulgence can make them selfish and vicious. In some cases, the young hero perpetrates some faults that result in a repressive and brutal education, violence and injustice in some cases. In other cases, the parents spoil and never punish their child, or systematically defend them, whichever their behaviours.

Nothing is definite in the case of the children. However, it is sometimes too late for others, who will become mean and childish adults and will abuse their children.

More than simple novels with an autobiography influence, the novels of Countess de Segur have highly influenced a new idea of pedagogy.

- Un bon petit diable
- Les Malheurs de Sophie
- Diloy le chemineau
- Mémoires d'un âne
- Jean qui grogne et Jean qui rit
- Le Mauvais Génie
- François le bossu
- Les Caprices de Gizelle
- Pauvre Blaise
- La Fortune de Gaspard

les Bons enfants Les Deux Nigaux

- Quel amour d'enfant !
- Les Petites Filles modèles
- La Sœur de Gribouille
- Blondine
- Après la pluie, le beau temps
- Les Vacances
- L'Auberge de l'Ange gardien
- Le général Dourakine

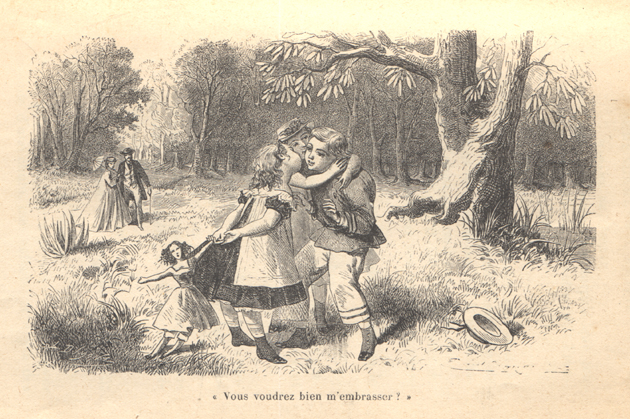
"Do you want to give me a kiss?"
