= Encore (1996 film) =

- Film poster
- Directed by: Pascal Bonitzer
- Written by: Pascal Bonitzer
- Produced by: Claude Kunetz
- Starring: Jackie Berroyer; Valeria Bruni Tedeschi
- Cinematography: Emmanuel Machuel
- Edited by: Suzanne Koch
- Distributed by: Rézo Films
- Release date: 25 September 1996
- Running time: 96 minutes
- Country: France
- Language: French
- Budget: $1.7 million
- Box office: $1.9 million

Encore is a 1996 French comedy-drama film written and directed by Pascal Bonitzer in his feature directorial debut. The film stars Jackie Berroyer, Valeria Bruni Tedeschi, Laurence Côte, Natacha Régnier, and Hélène Fillières.

== Synopsis ==
The film follows the mid-life crisis of a university professor.

== Cast ==
- Jackie Berroyer as Abel Vichac
- Valeria Bruni Tedeschi as Aliette
- Natacha Régnier as Catherine
- Hélène Fillières as Aurore
- Laurence Côte as Florence
- Michel Massé as Thomas
- Louis-Do de Lencquesaing as Bruno
- Fabrice Desplechin as Henri
- Meï Zhou as Lin Tong
- Eva Ionesco as Olga
- Pascal Bonitzer as Bergère
- Lou Castel as Le Vendeur du métro

== Awards and nominations ==
Bonitzer was awarded the 1996 Prix Jean Vigo for Encore. The film also earned him a César Award nomination for Best First Feature Film. Régnier was nominated for the 1997 Acteurs à l'Écran Best Actress award for her performance in the film.
