= Nicole Lubtchansky =

French film editor

- Died: 5 September 2014
- Occupation: Film editor
- Spouse: William Lubtchansky
- Children: Irina Lubtchansky

Nicole Lubtchansky was a French film editor who worked primarily with director Jacques Rivette. She edited twenty of Rivette's films, starting with 1969's L'amour fou and concluding with 2009's Around a Small Mountain. In between, Lubtchansky edited such acclaimed Rivette films as Celine and Julie Go Boating, Love on the Ground and La Belle Noiseuse.

Lubtchansky was married to Rivette's frequent cinematographer, William Lubtchansky. Their marriage lasted until his death in 2010; she died four years later, on 5 September 2014.

== Selected filmography ==
=== For Jacques Rivette ===
- L'amour fou (1969)
- Out 1 (1971)
  - Out 1: Spectre (alternate "short" version of Out 1 released in 1974)
- Celine and Julie Go Boating (1974)
- Duelle (1976)
- Noroît (1976)
- Merry-Go-Round (1981)
- Paris s'en va (1981 short film)
- Le Pont du Nord (1981)
- Love on the Ground (1984)
- Hurlevent (1985)
- La Belle Noiseuse (1991)
- Joan the Maiden (Part 1: The Battles and Part 2: The Prisons) (1994)
- Up, Down, Fragile (1995)
- Top Secret (1998)
- Va savoir (2001)
- The Story of Marie and Julien (2003)
- The Duchess of Langeais (2007)
- Around a Small Mountain (2009)

=== For Nadine Trintignant ===
- Crime Thief (1969)
- It Only Happens to Others (1971)
- Défense de savoir (1973)
- Colette, une femme libre (2004) - TV Mini-Series

=== For other directors ===
- Nathalie Granger (1972; directed by Marguerite Duras)
- Une journée bien remplie (1973; directed by Jean-Louis Trintignant)
- Hécate (1984; directed by Daniel Schmid)
- Cross (1987; directed by Philippe Setbon)
- Die Antigone des Sophokles nach der Hölderlinschen Übertragung für die Bühne bearbeitet von Brecht 1948 (Suhrkamp Verlag) (1992; directed by Straub-Huillet)
- Young Werther (1993; directed by Jacques Doillon)
