= Maigret and the Dead Lover =

- Official poster
- French: Maigret et le mort amoureux
- Directed by: Pascal Bonitzer
- Screenplay by: Pascal Bonitzer
- Based on: Maigret et les Vieillards by Georges Simenon
- Produced by: Saïd Ben Saïd; Jacques-Henri Bronckart; Kevin Chneiweiss (associate producer); Tatjana Kozar; John Simenon (associate producer)
- Starring: Denis Podalydès; Anne Alvaro; Manuel Guillot; Irène Jacob; Dominique Reymond; Micha Lescot; Olivier Rabourdin; Laurent Poitrenaux; Julia Faure
- Cinematography: Pierre Milon
- Music by: Alexeï Aïgui
- Production company: SBS Productions
- Distributed by: Pyramide Distribution
- Release date: 18 February 2026
- Running time: 80 minutes
- Country: France
- Language: French

Maigret and the Dead Lover (French: Maigret et le mort amoureux, originally titled Maigret et le crime de la rue de Bellechasse) is a 2026 French crime drama film written and directed by Pascal Bonitzer, and starring Denis Podalydès in the eponymous role. It is based on the 1960 novel Maigret et les Vieillards ("Maigret and the Old People") by Georges Simenon.

== Plot ==
A former French ambassador, who has been carrying out a five decade affair with a recently widowed princess, is found murdered at the Quai d'Orsay, and the only evidence found are a series of suggestive letters between the two. Policeman Jules Maigret is tasked with discreetly investigating the matter.

== Cast ==
- Denis Podalydès as Commissaire Jules Maigret
- Anne Alvaro as Jacotte
- Manuel Guillot as Janvier
- Irène Jacob as Madame Louise Maigret
- Dominique Reymond as Princess Isi of Vuynes
- Laurent Poitrenaux as Philippe de Vuynes
- Micha Lescot as Mazeron
- Julia Faure as Juliette
- Jeremy Lewin as Cromière
- Olivier Rabourdin as the prosecutor
- Arcadi Radeff as Julien de Vuynes
- Cyril Gueï as Lapointe
- Matthieu Lucci as Lucas
- Stéphane Mercoyrol as Moers
- Nikola Krminac as PTS technician
- Laure-Lucile Simon as Doctor Paul
- Noël Simsolo as Abbot Gauge
- Hugues Quester as Maître Aubonnet
- Natalia Pujszo as Ludmilla, the saleswoman
- Justinien Schricke as voice of radio journalist
- Pierre-François Grunenwald as Client Mazeron
- Osamu Morimoto as Client Mazeron
- Charlotte Marciano as Secretary Aubonnet
- Yannick Dyvrande as waiter at Brasserie Dauphine
- Claire Rochelle as secretary prosecutor
- Emma de Bermingham as Maggie
- Clément Goyard as Vuynes head waiter
- Gaëtan Galliod as Berthier-Lagès
- Pierre Ewoudou as Bailiff Quai d'Orsay
- Nicolas Ulrich as driver from Vuynes
- André Marcon as Chief Inspector from Quai des Orfèvres

== Production ==
In January 2024, filmmaker Pascal Bonitzer announced he would write and potentially direct an adaptation of the novel Maigret et les Vieillards, with the English title being Maigret in Society. By September, Denis Podalydès was cast as Maigret. Podalydès and Bonitzer had previously collaborated on the 1999 film Rien sur Robert.

Filming took place in the 7th arrondissement of Paris. It lasted for five weeks from February to March 2025.

The film's title was changed first to Maigret et le crime de la rue de Bellechasse ("Maigret and the Crime on Rue de Bellechasse"), and then finally Maigret et le mort amoureux ("Maigret and the Dead Man in Love"), with the English title becoming Maigret and the Dead Lover.

The film was released on February 18, 2026, the year marking Maigret's ninety-fifth anniversary. The initial audience reception has been generally positive thus far.
