= Love on the Ground =

- Promotional poster
- Directed by: Jacques Rivette
- Written by: Pascal Bonitzer; Marilù Parolini; Suzanne Schiffman; Jacques Rivette
- Produced by: Arthur Cohn; Martine Marignac
- Starring: Jane Birkin; Geraldine Chaplin; André Dussollier; Jean-Pierre Kalfon
- Cinematography: William Lubtchansky
- Edited by: Nicole Lubtchansky
- Distributed by: Gaumont Distribution
- Release date: 17 October 1984
- Running time: 125 min 169 min (director's cut)
- Country: France
- Language: French

Love on the Ground (French: L'Amour par terre) is a 1984 French film directed by Jacques Rivette. The film stars Jane Birkin, Geraldine Chaplin, André Dussollier and Jean-Pierre Kalfon. It was released in France on 17 October 1984.

== Plot ==
On the streets of Paris, a man mysteriously collects a group of people, finally leading them into a small apartment to witness a theatre performance. The audience, in close proximity to the actors, become voyeurs. As they walk from room to room, they watch as bumbling Silvano (Bo) attempts to hide his two girlfriends, Charlotte (Chaplin) and Emily (Birkin), from each other in this same crowded apartment. While the actors feel frustrated at the shambles of a set they must work with, the play's author, Clément Roquemaure (Kalfon), is silently auditioning them for his new play, to be performed at his strangely empty mansion.

After arriving at the unusual mansion, which has many wildly painted rooms, Charlotte and Emily start to experience disturbing visions, in part due to the presence of a magician, Paul, who also lives at the mansion. As the rehearsal progresses, the two actresses' visions start to unearth a romantic calamity that took place at the mansion. The final performance of the play places the two actresses into a possible tragic re-enactment of the very horror they are only now beginning to understand.

== Cast ==
- Geraldine Chaplin as Charlotte
- Jane Birkin as Emily
- André Dussollier as Paul
- Jean-Pierre Kalfon as Clément Roquemaure
- Isabelle Linnartz as Béatrice
- Sandra Montaigu as Eléonore
- László Szabó as Virgil
- Facundo Bo as Silvano

== Reception ==
Janet Maslin of The New York Times noted that the screenplay "wittily affords the director a great many opportunities for a brand of gamesmanship that enlivens the film without trivializing it. Mr. Rivette is able to sustain a complex, shifting relationship between the real and the theatrical without losing the film's overriding sense of fun." Maslin continued her analysis; "The process by which Clement's theatrical work is molded to fit reality, and vice versa, is rendered in a clever, entertaining style that fits perfectly with the behavior of the participants, since Mr. Rivette displays a cool ingenuity that matches that of the performers. Even when it becomes entangled in the romances that take shape during the course of the week, the film sustains its trickiness and sophistication." Maslin also praised the casting; "Miss Birkin and Miss Chaplin make an invigorating team, and the combination of their offbeat styles is full of surprises."

Colin Greenland reviewed L'amour par terre for Imagine magazine, describing it as "A teasing mystery, with wry, sensitive performances from Geraldine Chapman and Jane Birkin."
