= Hurlevent =

- Theatrical release poster
- Directed by: Jacques Rivette
- Written by: Pascal Bonitzer; Marilù Parolini; Suzanne Schiffman; Jacques Rivette
- Based on: Wuthering Heights; 1847 novel by Emily Brontë
- Produced by: Martine Marignac
- Starring: Fabienne Babe; Lucas Belvaux; Olivier Cruveiller
- Cinematography: Renato Berta
- Edited by: Nicole Lubtchansky
- Music by: Pilentze Pee; Angelika Trati Na; Polegnala E. Pschenitza
- Distributed by: AMLF
- Release date: 9 October 1985
- Running time: 130 minutes
- Country: France
- Language: French

Hurlevent ([yʁ.lə.vɑ̃], "Howling wind") is a 1985 French drama film directed and co-written by Jacques Rivette. It is an adaptation of Emily Brontë's 1847 novel Wuthering Heights. Based on the first part of the novel, set in 1930s southern France, it starred three unknown actors: Fabienne Babe as Catherine, Lucas Belvaux as Roch (Heathcliff), and Olivier Cruveiller as Catherine's brother.

== Cast ==
- Fabienne Babe as Catherine
- Lucas Belvaux as Roch
- Sandra Montaigu as Hélène
- Alice de Poncheville as Isabelle
- Olivier Cruveiller as Guillaume
- Philippe Morier-Genoud as Joseph
- Olivier Torres as Olivier
- Marie Jaoul as Madame Lindon
- Louis de Menthon as Monsieur Lindon
- Jacques Deleuze as Le médecin
- Joseph Schilinger as Le garde-chasse
