= Pascal Bonitzer =

French film director

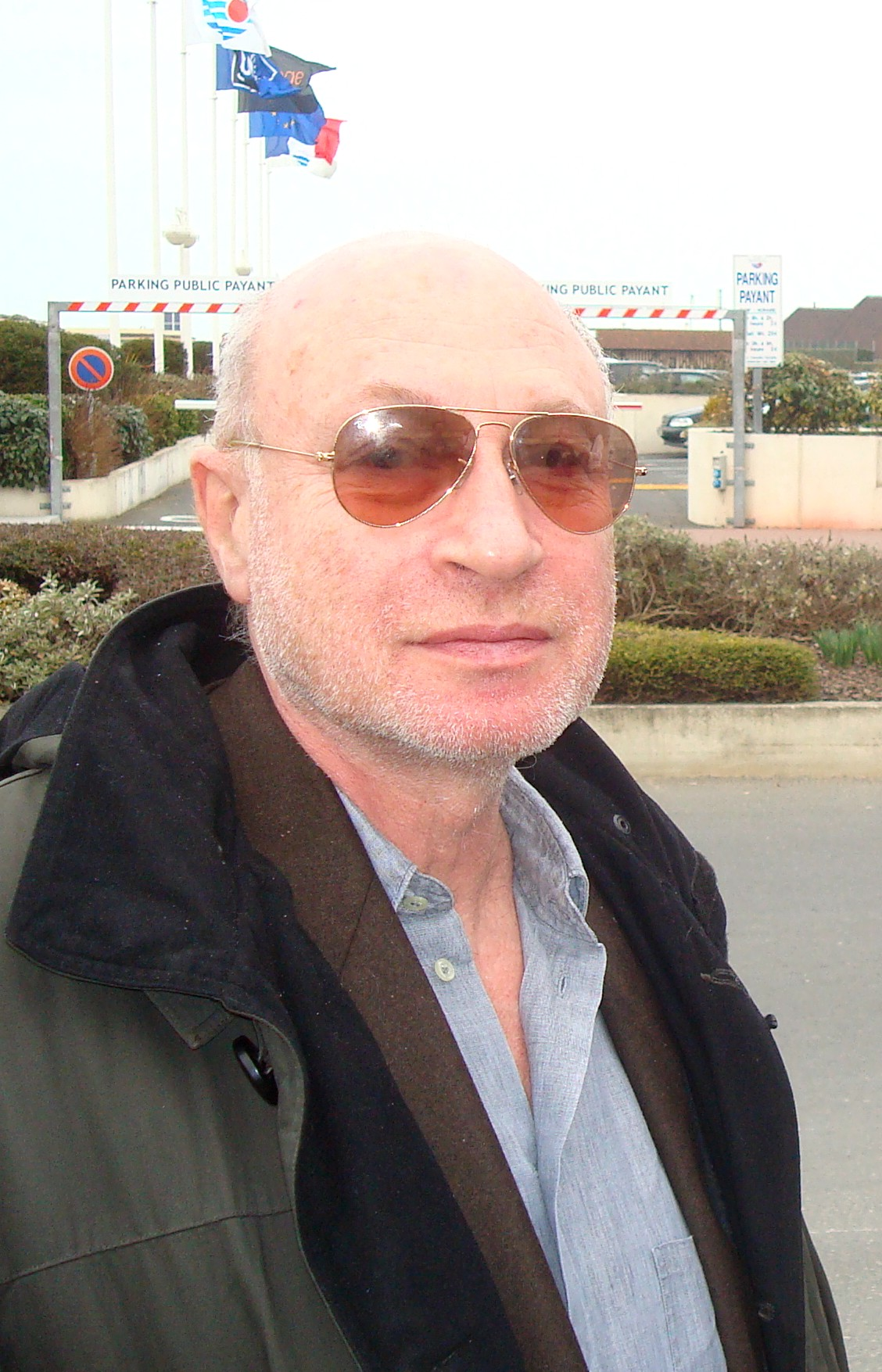
- Bonitzer in 2010
- Born: 1 February 1946 (age 80); Paris, France
- Occupations: Screenwriter, film director, actor, film critic
- Years active: 1967–present
- Partner: Sophie Fillières
- Children: Agathe Bonitzer

Pascal Bonitzer (French: [bɔnitsɛʁ]; born 1 February 1946) is a French screenwriter, film director, actor, and former film critic for Cahiers du cinéma. Since 1967, he has written for 48 films, appeared in 30 films, and directed 10. He starred in Raúl Ruiz's 1978 film The Suspended Vocation.

Bonitzer has received three César Award nominations: Best Original Screenplay or Adaptation for My Favorite Season (1993), Best First Feature Film for Encore (1996), and Best Original Screenplay for Les Innocentes (2016).

He has a daughter, actress Agathe Bonitzer, with filmmaker Sophie Fillières.

== Filmography ==
=== 1960s–70s ===
Year	Title	Credited as			Notes
Year	Title	Director	Screenwriter	Actor	Notes
1967	Vampirisme			Yes	Short film
1976	Moi, Pierre Rivière, ayant égorgé ma mère, ma sœur et mon frère...		Yes		Collaboration
1978	L'Exercice du pouvoir		Yes		
1978	The Suspended Vocation			Yes	
1979	The Brontë Sisters		Yes	Yes	

=== 1980s ===
Year	Title	Credited as			Notes
Year	Title	Director	Screenwriter	Actor	Notes
1980	Simone Barbes or Virtue			Yes	
1980	Snakes and Ladders			Yes	TV short
1980	Une voix			Yes	Short film
1980	Le Borgne			Yes	
1981	L'Ombre rouge			Yes	
1982	Jimmy Jazz		Yes	Yes	Short film
1983	Balles perdues			Yes	
1983	Liberty Belle		Yes	Yes	
1984	Cheaters (Tricheurs)		Yes		
1984	Love on the Ground		Yes	Yes	
1985	Rouge-gorge			Yes	
1985	Hurlevent		Yes		
1986	Golden Eighties		Yes		
1986	Scene of the Crime		Yes		
1987	Les Innocents		Yes		
1988	The Beggars		Yes		
1988	Daniel endormi			Yes	Short film
1989	Gang of Four		Yes		
1989	Les Bois noirs		Yes		
1989	Winter's Child			Yes	
1989	Les Sirènes	Yes	Yes		Short film

=== 1990s ===
Year	Title	Credited as			Notes
Year	Title	Director	Screenwriter	Actor	Notes
1990	Un jeu d'enfant		Yes		Scenario collaborator
1990	Mistress of Suspense		Yes		TV series
1991	L'Amour maudit de Leisenbohg		Yes		Telefilm
1991	La Belle Noiseuse		Yes		
1991	Night and Day		Yes		
1991	The Sky Above Paris			Yes	
1992	La Chasse aux papillons			Yes	
1993	My Favorite Season		Yes		Nominated—César Award for Best Original Screenplay or Adaptation
1993	Couples et Amants		Yes		
1994	Joan the Maiden, Part 1: The Battles		Yes		
1994	Joan the Maiden, Part 2: The Prisons		Yes		
1994	Grande Petite			Yes	
1995	Le Fils de Gascogne			Yes	
1995	Up, Down, Fragile		Yes		
1995	Don't Forget You're Going to Die			Yes	
1996	Thieves		Yes		Scenario collaborator
1996	Three Lives and Only One Death		Yes	Yes	
1996	Encore	Yes	Yes	Yes	Prix Jean Vigo; Nominated—César Award for Best First Feature Film
1997	Genealogies of a Crime		Yes	Yes	
1997	Night of Destiny		Yes		
1998	Secret Defense		Yes		
1999	Rien sur Robert	Yes	Yes	Yes	
1999	Les Agneaux		Yes		Telefilm
1999	Les Infortunes de la beauté			Yes	
1999	Augustin, King of Kung-Fu			Yes	

=== 2000s ===
Year	Title	Credited as			Notes
Year	Title	Director	Screenwriter	Actor	Notes
2000	Lumumba		Yes		
2001	Man of the Crowds		Yes		
2001	Va savoir		Yes		
2001	Alias Betty			Yes	
2002	Like an Airplane		Yes		
2003	Small Cuts	Yes	Yes		Nominated—Berlin Film Festival - Golden Bear
2003	The Story of Marie and Julien		Yes		
2003	Hot House		Yes		Telefilm
2004	Changing Times		Yes		Nominated—Satellite Award for Best Original Screenplay
2004	Why (Not) Brazil?			Yes	
2006	L'Affaire Villemin		Yes		TV mini-series
2006	Made in Paris	Yes	Yes		
2007	The Duchess of Langeais		Yes		
2007	The Key			Yes	
2008	The Great Alibi	Yes	Yes		
2009	La Grande Vie		Yes		
2009	Around a Small Mountain		Yes		
2009	Don't Look Back			Yes	
2009	Suite noire			Yes	TV series

=== 2010s ===
Year	Title	Credited as			Notes
Year	Title	Director	Screenwriter	Actor	Notes
2010	Chantrapas			Yes	
2012	Looking for Hortense	Yes	Yes		
2012	The Gordji Affair			Yes	Telefilm
2014	Gemma Bovery		Yes		
2014	Murder in Pacot		Yes		
2014	Valentin Valentin		Yes	Yes	
2016	Agnus Dei		Yes		Nominated—César Award for Best Original Screenplay
2016	Tout de suite maintenant	Yes	Yes		
2017	Le Jeune Karl Marx		Yes		
2019	Blanche comme neige		Yes		
2019	Les Envoûtés	Yes	Yes		

=== 2020s ===
Year	Title	Credited as			Notes
Year	Title	Director	Screenwriter	Actor	Notes
2021	Benedetta		Yes		
2023	Last Summer		Yes		
2024	Auction	Yes	Yes		
2025	La Fille d'un grand amour			Yes	
2026	Maigret and the Dead Lover	Yes	Yes		
