= Suzanne Schiffman =

French screenwriter and director (1929–2001)

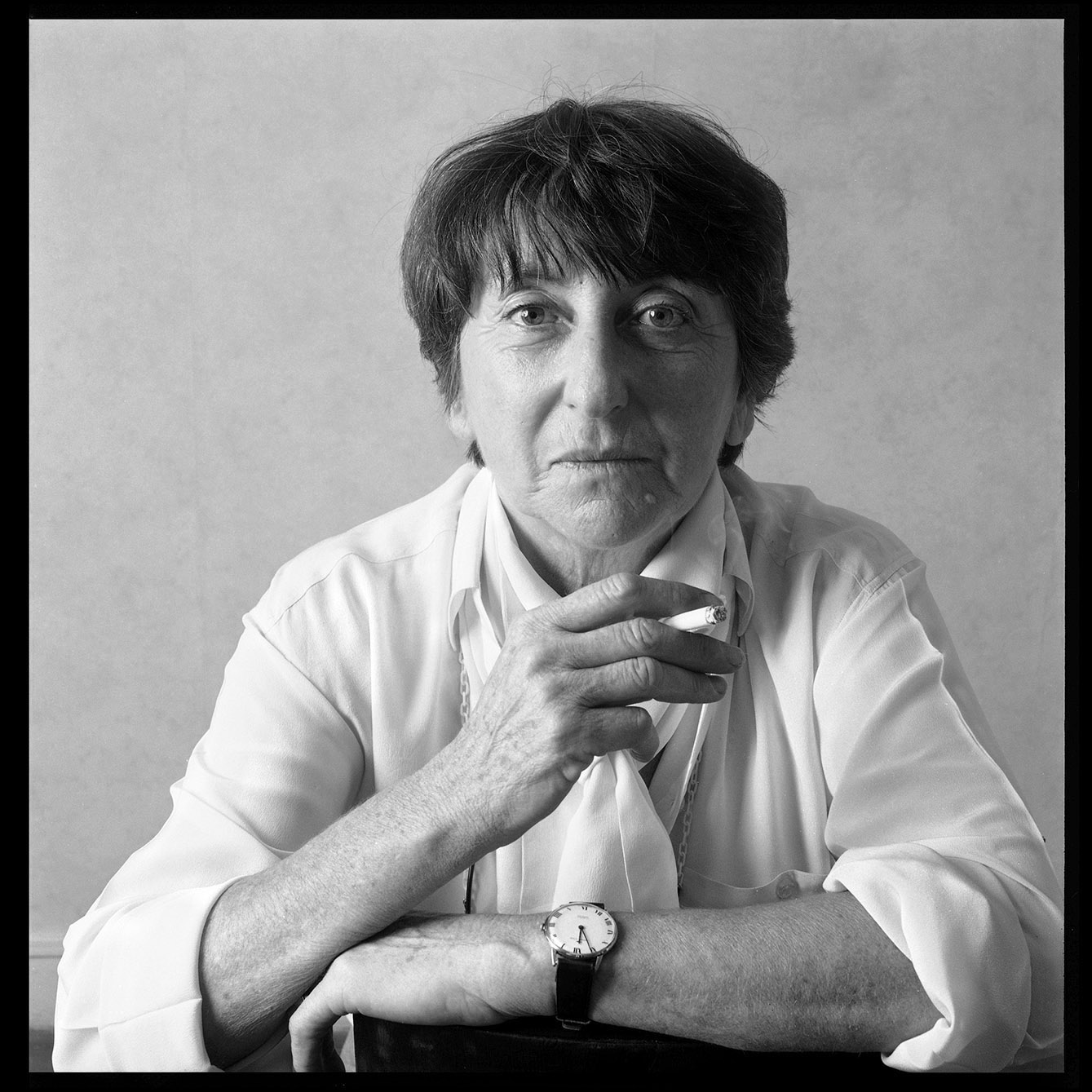
- Born: Suzanne Klochendler; 27 September 1929; Paris, France
- Died: 6 June 2001 (aged 71); Paris, France
- Years active: 1958–1992
- Spouse: Philippe Schiffman (1949–2000; his death)
- Children: 2, including Guillaume Schiffman

Suzanne Schiffman (née Klochendler; 27 September 1929 – 6 June 2001) was a French screenwriter and director for numerous motion pictures. She often worked with François Truffaut. The 'script girl' Joëlle, played by Nathalie Baye in Truffaut's Day for Night was based on Schiffman. It accurately portrayed her close collaboration with Truffaut and other directors.

Schiffman's Jewish mother was detained by the Gestapo during the war, but an order of nuns hid Schiffman and her sibling. She studied art history at the Sorbonne after the war. Schiffman worked closely with Jean-Luc Godard and Jacques Rivette in addition to Truffaut, latterly on the scripts of his films. She was nominated for an Academy Award for Best Original Screenplay for Day for Night and won a César Award for writing The Last Metro with Truffaut.

== Death ==
Suzanne Schiffman died of cancer in 2001, a year after her husband's death. She is the mother of two sons, one of whom is cinematographer Guillaume Schiffman.

== Filmography ==
- To oneiro tou Ikarou (2005) (writer) - directed by Costa Natsis
- Bolondok éneke (2003) (writer) - directed by Csaba Bereczky
- Tangos volés (2002) (screenplay) - directed by Eduardo de Gregorio
- Innocent (1999) (technical advisor) - directed by Costa Natsis
- Corps perdus (1990) (writer) - directed by Eduardo de Gregorio
- Femme de papier (1989) (TV) (writer, director) - directed by Suzanne Schiffman
- Le moine et la sorcière (1987) (scenario, director) - directed by Suzanne Schiffman
- Hurlevent (1985) (scenario, first assistant director) - directed by Jacques Rivette
- Flügel und Fesseln (1985) (additional writer) - directed by Helma Sanders-Brahms
- Rouge-gorge (1985) (scenario) - directed by Pierre Zucca
- L'amour par terre (1984) (scenario, first assistant director) - directed by Jacques Rivette
- The Man Who Loved Women (1983) (first story) - directed by Blake Edwards
- Vivement dimanche! (1983) (writer, assistant director) - directed by François Truffaut
- Merry-Go-Round (1981) (scenario) - directed by Jacques Rivette
- Le Pont du Nord (1981) (scenario, first assistant director) - directed by Jacques Rivette
- The Woman Next Door (1981) (original scenario, assistant director) - directed by François Truffaut
- The Last Metro (1980) (scenario, assistant director) - directed by François Truffaut
- L'amour en fuite (1979) (scenario, first assistant director) - directed by François Truffaut
- La chambre verte (1978) (assistant director) - directed by François Truffaut
- L'homme qui aimait les femmes (1977) (writer, first assistant director, actress) - directed by François Truffaut
- L'argent de poche (1976) (original scenario, first assistant director) - directed by François Truffaut
- The Story of Adèle H. (1975) (writer, assistant director) - directed by François Truffaut
- Out 1: Spectre (1974) (writer) - directed by Jacques Rivette
- Pleure pas la bouche pleine (1973) (writer, first assistant director) - directed by Pascal Thomas
- La nuit américaine (1973) (writer, assistant director) - directed by François Truffaut
- La société du spectacle (1973) (documentalist) - directed by Guy Debord
- Such a Gorgeous Kid Like Me (1972) (assistant director) - directed by François Truffaut
- Two English Girls (1971) (assistant director) - directed by François Truffaut
- Out 1 (1971) (scenario) - directed by Jacques Rivette and Suzanne Schiffman
- Le bateau sur l'herbe (1971) (writer) - directed by Gérard Brach
- Domicile conjugal (1970) (first assistant director) - directed by François Truffaut
- L'enfant sauvage (1970) (assistant director) - directed by François Truffaut
- Mississippi Mermaid (1969) (script supervisor) - directed by François Truffaut
- Stolen Kisses (1968) (script girl) - directed by François Truffaut
- Les Gauloises bleues (1968) (script supervisor) - directed by Michel Cournot
- Fahrenheit 451 (1966) (assistant to director) - directed by François Truffaut
- A Married Woman (1964) (script supervisor) - directed by Jean-Luc Godard
- Bande à part (1964) (script supervisor) - directed by Jean-Luc Godard
- La peau douce (1964) (script girl) - François Truffaut
- Contempt (1963) (script girl) - directed by Jean-Luc Godard
- Le petit soldat (1963) (script girl) - directed by Jean-Luc Godard
- Vivre sa vie (1962) (script girl) - directed by Jean-Luc Godard
- Jules et Jim (1962) (script supervisor) - directed by François Truffaut
- Une femme est une femme (1961) (script girl) - directed by Jean-Luc Godard
- Lola (1961) (script girl) - directed by Jacques Demy
- Tirez sur le pianiste (1960) (script girl) - directed by François Truffaut
- Paris nous appartient (1960) (dialogue coach) - directed by Jacques Rivette
