= Passion (1982 film) =

- Directed by: Jean-Luc Godard
- Written by: Jean-Luc Godard; Jean-Claude Carrière (uncredited)
- Produced by: Armand Barbault; Catherine Lapoujade; Martine Marignac
- Starring: Isabelle Huppert; Jerzy Radziwilowicz; Hanna Schygulla; Michel Piccoli; László Szabó
- Cinematography: Raoul Coutard
- Edited by: Jean-Luc Godard
- Distributed by: Parafrance Films
- Release date: 26 May 1982
- Running time: 88 minutes
- Countries: Switzerland; France
- Language: French

Passion (French: Passion) is a 1982 film by Jean-Luc Godard, the second full-length film made during his return to relatively mainstream filmmaking in the 1980s.

Set in winter in Switzerland, it is about the making of an ambitious art film that uses re-creations of classical European paintings as tableaux vivants, set to classical European music. Only incomplete scenes of the film within the film are shown, because it has no settled plot and never gets finished. While making it, the crew become involved in various ways with the locals, some of whom are recruited as extras.

== Plot ==
Jerzy is a Polish director, making a film at a studio in Switzerland which contains a series of tableaux vivants. His producer László is impatient because there is no apparent story to the film and Jerzy keeps delaying and cancelling shoots, repeatedly citing difficulties with the lighting. During the filming, Jerzy gets involved with two local women: Isabelle, an earnest young factory worker with a stutter, and Hanna, the worldly German owner of the motel where the crew are staying. Hanna is married to Michel, a difficult man with a chronic cough who owns the factory where Isabelle works.

Isabelle is fired from her job and attempts to organize her fellow workers to strike – not for her sake, but for their own. The film crew is meanwhile recruiting factory workers as extras for the tableaux that Jerzy is shooting. Jerzy continues to search for the right lighting in the studio and to try to manage an increasingly unruly group of extras. At the same time he is trying to continue his relationship with Hanna, with whom he has shot some test footage that the two review together while discussing the intersection of love and work. Jerzy is also taken with Isabelle, who also wants to merge love and work. She tries to get Jerzy involved with her cause and to make meaningful connections with the film crew, asking them why films never show people working.

Finally, Isabelle and Jerzy have an intimate encounter and Isabelle gives up her virginity. She accepts a payoff from Michel, her fellow workers having abandoned their half-hearted attempt at a strike. László secures more money for the film but Jerzy feels the tug of the dramatic events of the Solidarity movement in Poland and of his family back there. Feeling unable to complete the project, he leaves for Poland without either Isabelle or Hanna but instead with a waitress from the motel. Isabelle and Hanna connect up with each other and also decide to go to Poland.

== Cast ==
- Jerzy Radziwilowicz - Jerzy
- Isabelle Huppert - Isabelle
- Hanna Schygulla - Hanna
- Michel Piccoli - Michel
- László Szabó – László
- Myriem Roussel – One of the nude models
- Sophie Loucachevsky - Sophie

== The tableaux vivants ==
The Night Watch

Though the original paintings which the tableaux vivants portray are frozen in space and time and can be studied at leisure in two dimensions, in silence, the film makes them three-dimensional. The camera moves around the actors, who move in and out of position, the lighting varies and recorded classical music plays. However, viewers are given no chance to appreciate any of the tableaux in any depth because only partial views are shown for relatively brief moments.

=== Rembrandt ===
The Night Watch is intercut with views of Isabelle working in the factory. There is discussion over what story the painting is telling, or whether it has no story at all, over its intricate construction, and over the source and intensity of its lighting. These three themes echo throughout Passion, which has continuing arguments over the significance of plot, the relationships between characters, and the inadequacies of artificial light (symbolising the artificiality of cinema itself).

=== Goya ===
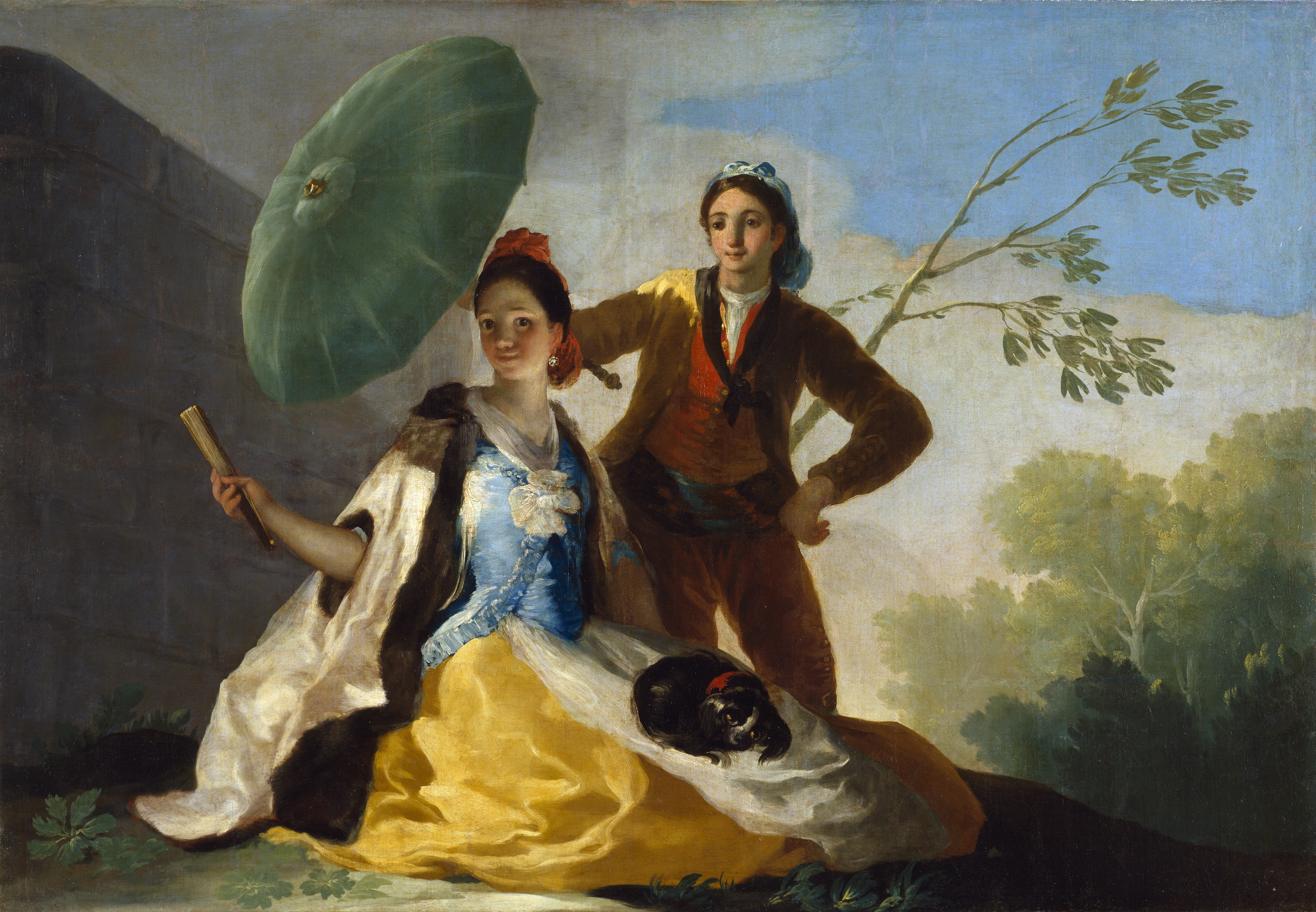
The Parasol

The Third of May 1808

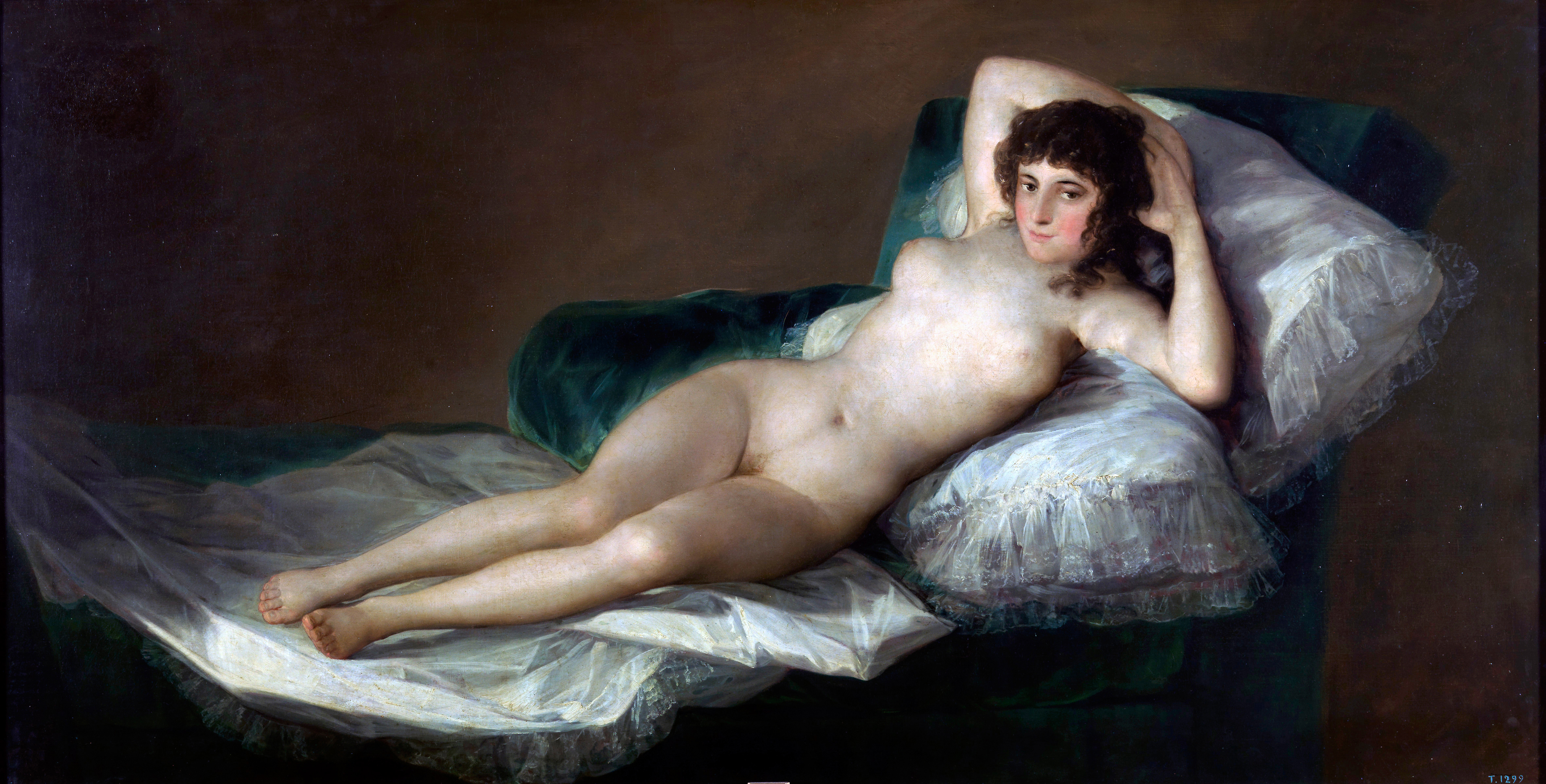
La Maja Desnuda

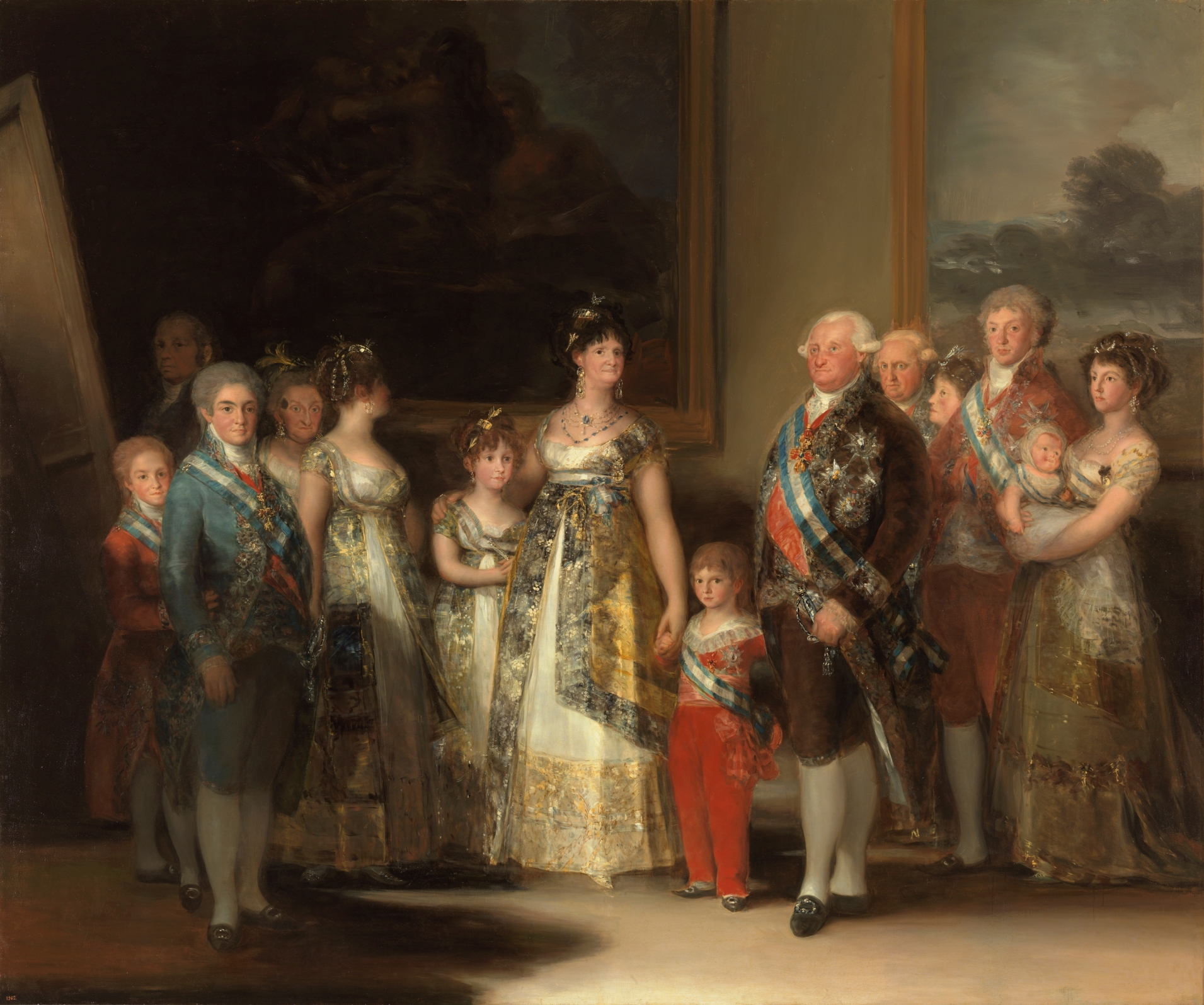
The Family of Charles IV

Accompanied by the Introitus of Mozart's Requiem, elements of four Goya paintings are shown. At first only the woman from the apparently innocent pastoral scene of The Parasol can be seen, who then walks towards the firing squad in Third of May 1808 and is enmeshed in the horrors of war. In the background can be glimpsed La Maja Desnuda, exuding sexual allure, while actors are getting ready for Charles IV of Spain and His Family. Inserted are shots of Isabelle asleep in her apartment.

=== Ingres ===
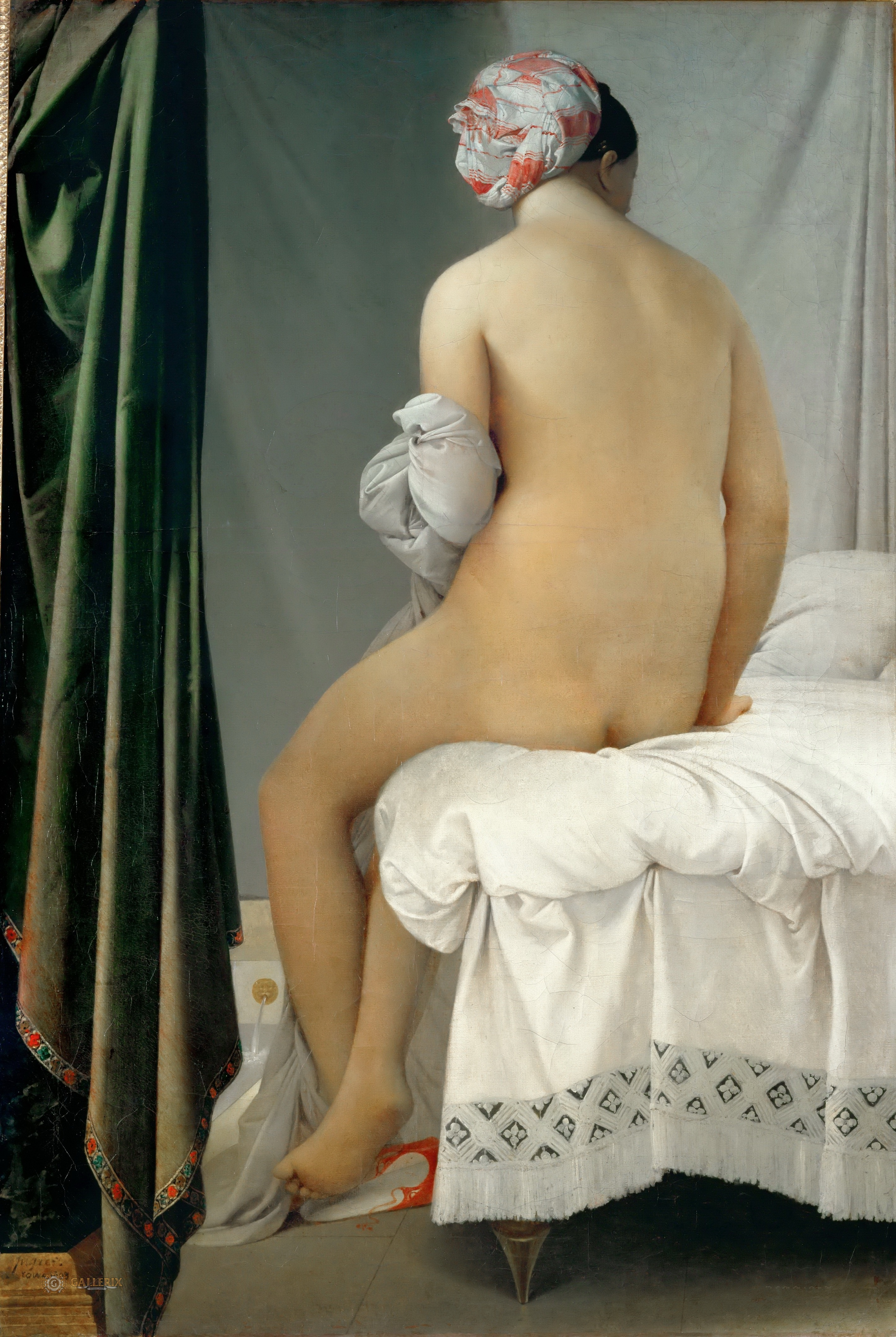
The Valpinçon Bather

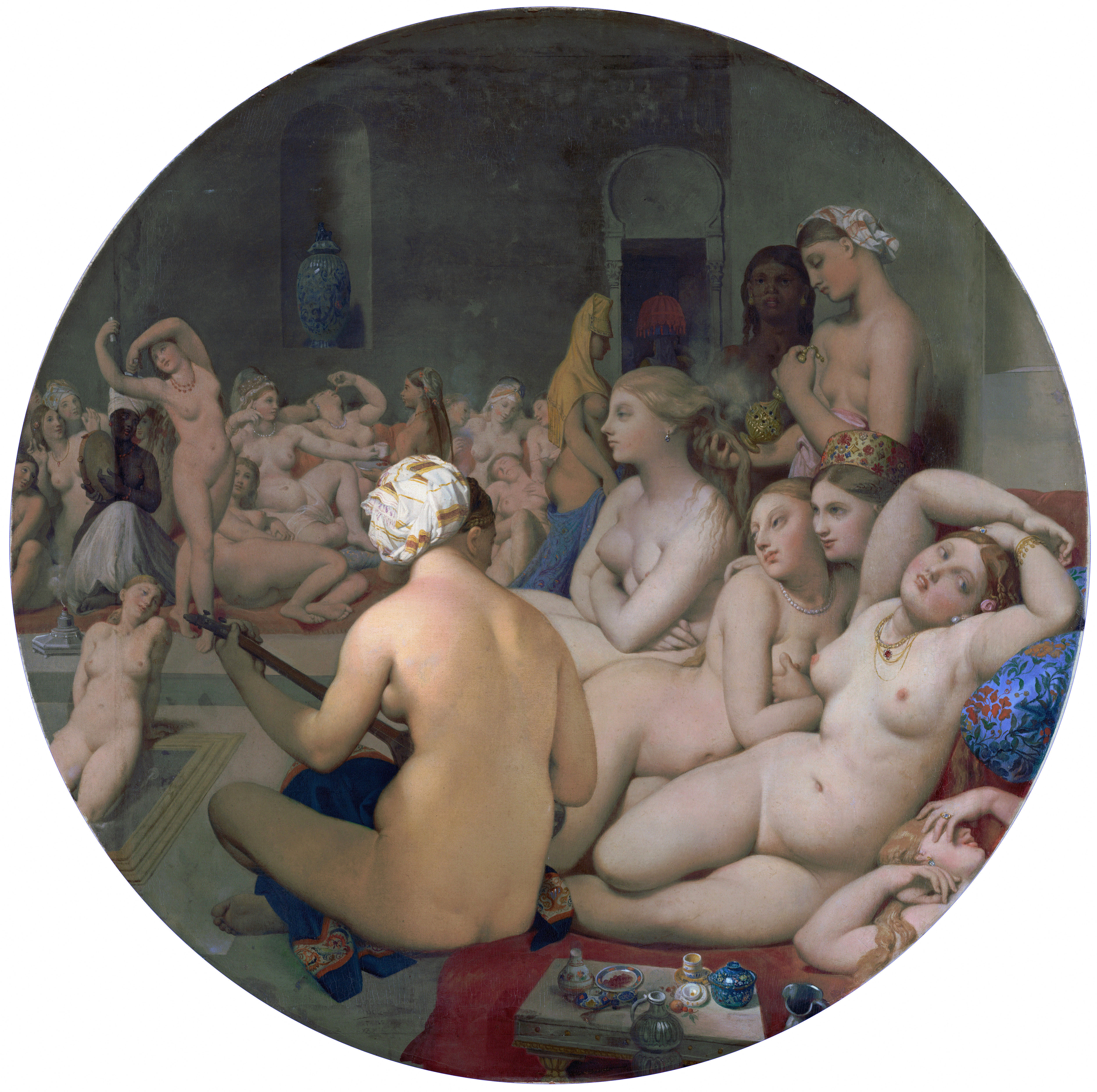
The Turkish Bath

Paintings of nude women in Turkish baths, such as The Valpinçon Bather and The Turkish Bath, are only recreated in fragments, interrupted by episodes in the motel and in the factory. The naked actresses in the studio continue the theme of desire, typified by the Naked Maja, while the outside scenes reprise the world of work. When Jerzy is not content with the lighting, as usual, the producer asks him what is «the right light». He responds by plunging the studio into darkness, to show that it is a place where lighting can never match reality, and draws a comparison between Hanna, a woman open to the light, and Isabelle who is opaque. However, Jerzy does persuade Isabelle to be one of the naked models.

=== Delacroix ===
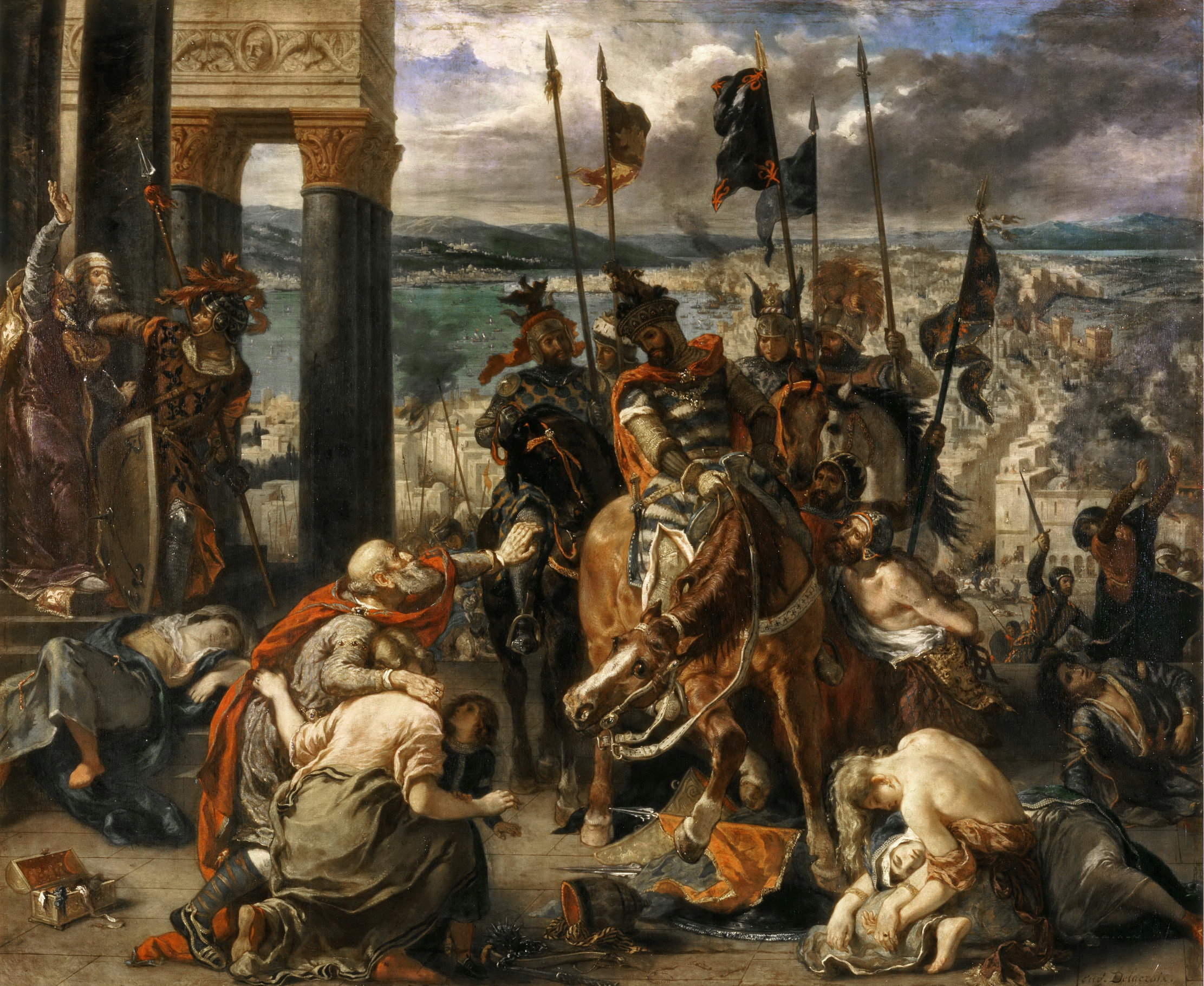
The Entry of the Crusaders in Constantinople

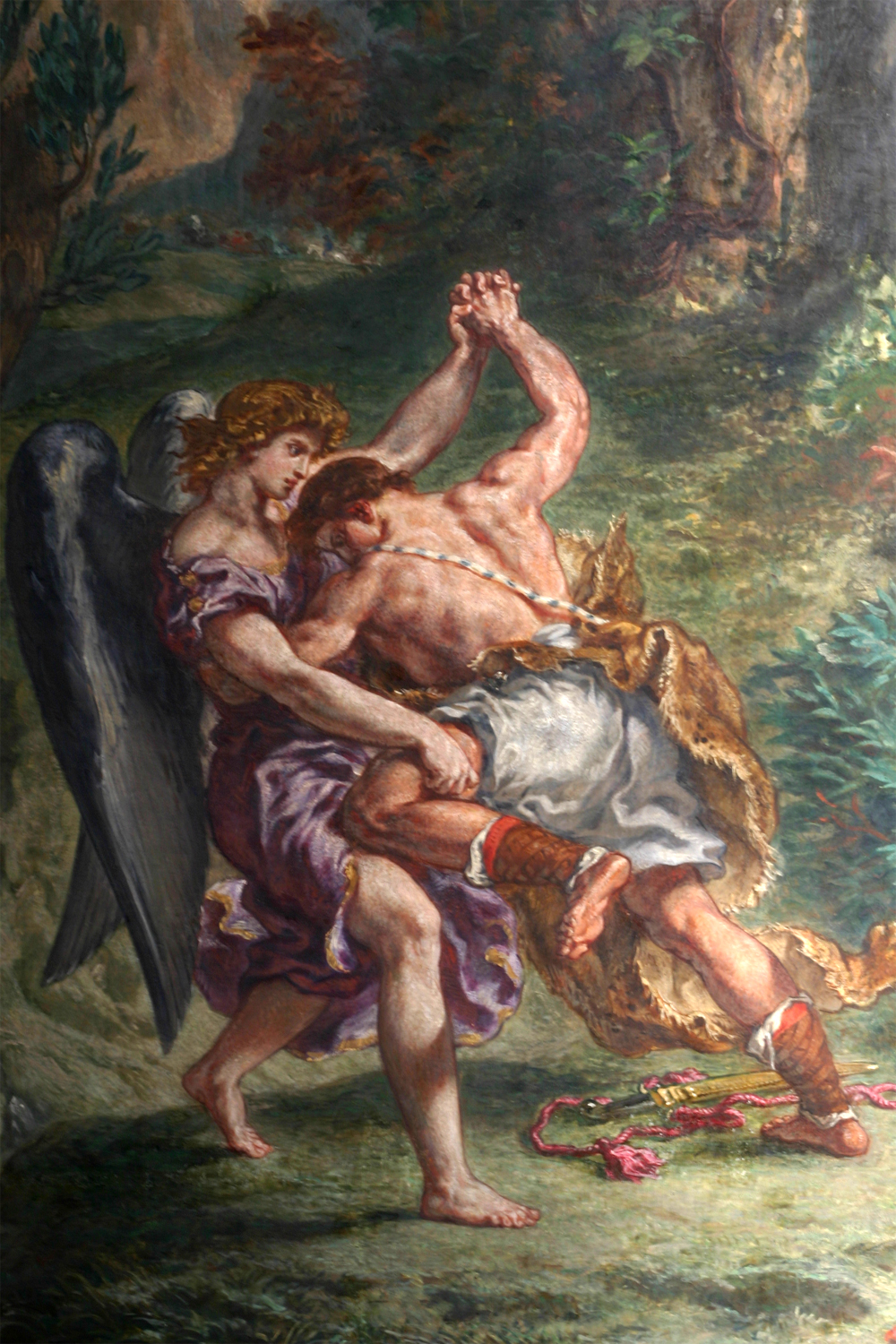
Jacob wrestling with the Angel

In these tableaux, which recreate the Entry of the Crusaders in Constantinople and Jacob wrestling with the Angel, there is a high degree of movement. Knights on horseback circle restlessly around the set of the Greek city, while Jerzy himself becomes part of the scene when he begins a wrestling match with the actor playing the Angel.

=== El Greco ===
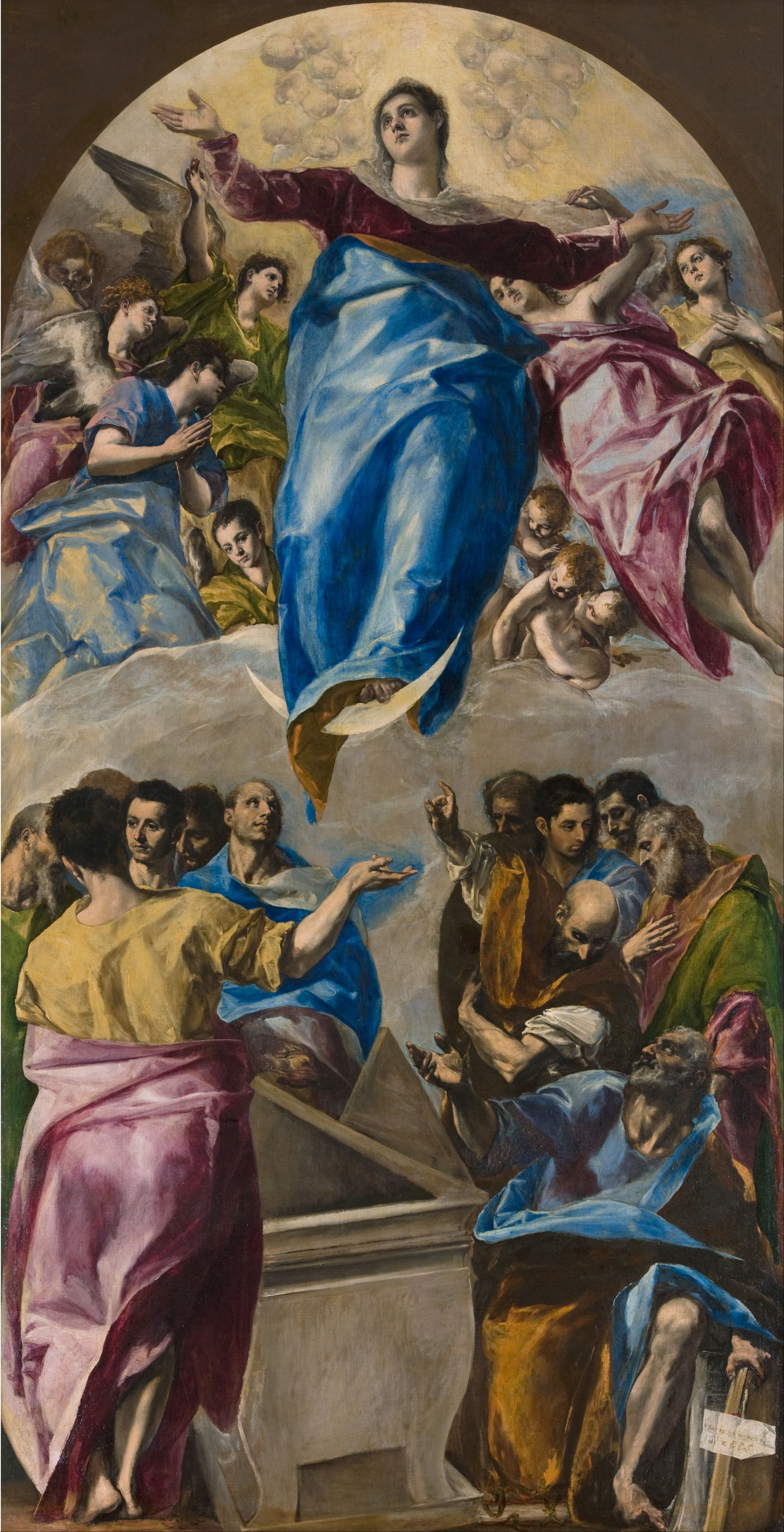
The Assumption of the Virgin

Set to Fauré’s Requiem, the tableau of the Assumption of the Virgin has parallel scenes in the motel involving Jerzy and Isabelle, who admits she is still a virgin.

=== Watteau ===
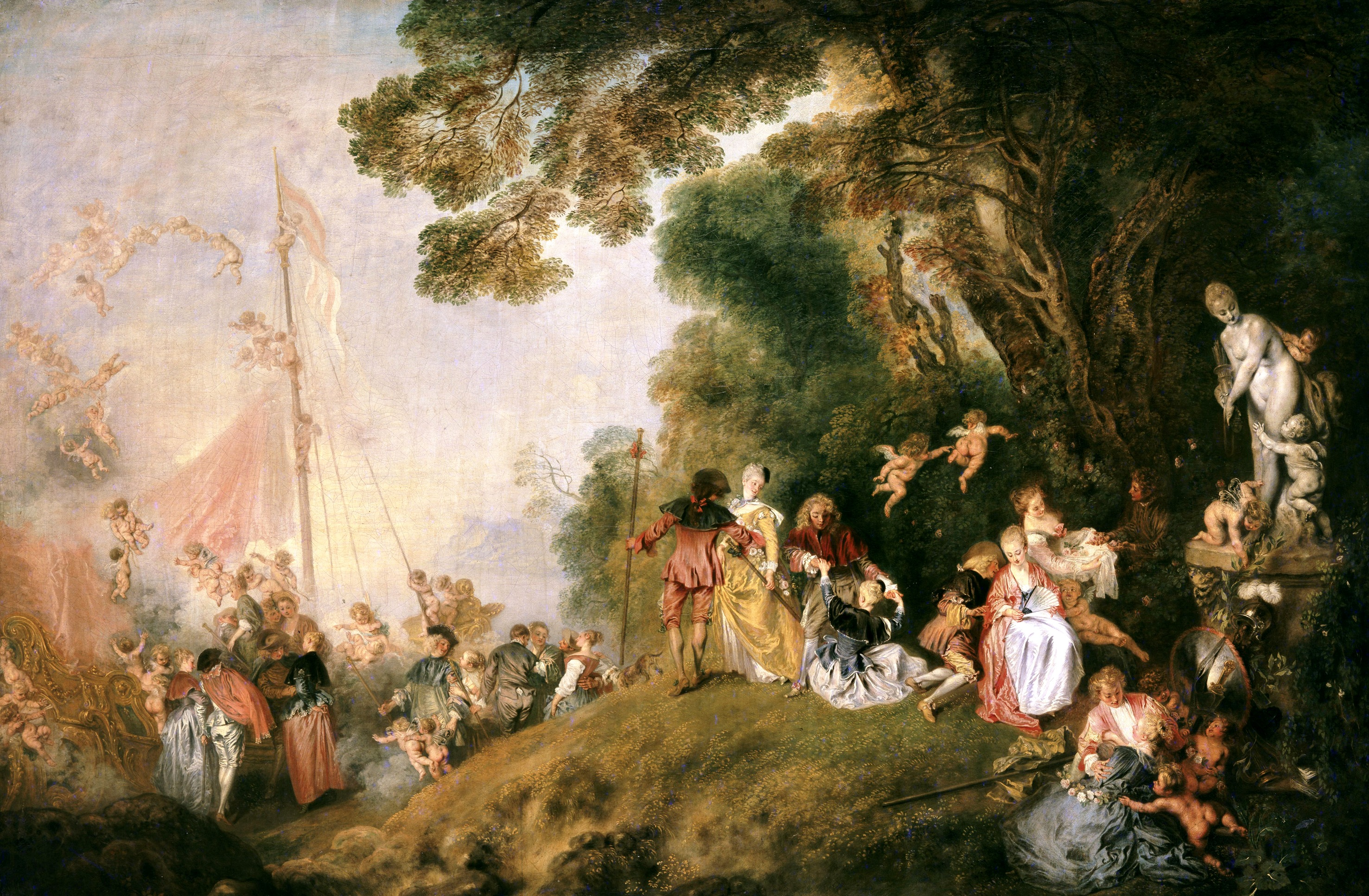
The Embarkation for Cythera

The Embarkation for Cythera is only shown in disjointed fragments, after it becomes evident that the film is never going to be completed, and the camera stays far away, giving a dispassionate documentary air to the empty ship and isolated couples. Significantly, it is the only tableau in the open air exploiting natural light.

== Themes ==
=== Art and life ===
In several ways, the film looks back to Godard's 1963 film Contempt, about the tensions among a multinational team on location making a film that will never be completed. That film also had Michel Piccoli as one of the male leads and was shot by Raoul Coutard. It too oscillated between the demands of art, in that case a debased commercial version of an immortal work, and of life.

In Passion, the contrast between the two is clear. The world of the tableaux vivants is that of high art, of rich colours and forms embodied in costumes and props of beauty and accompanied by a soundtrack of masterpieces. That of people outside, both those making the film and those at the motel and the factory, is one where, though they may have ideals, they cannot escape everyday issues of survival, particularly sex and money. It is a world that is grey, wintry and often dull.

The artistic interludes in the film have no dialogue, just as the paintings they represent speak silently to viewers by means of form and colour. But the life of the film makers and townspeople suffers from lack of communication, with often incoherent conversations that are sometimes in different unsubtitled languages. One character has a stutter, another a hacking cough, one is mute, and the producer tries to talk to the director through a closed window.

Links are made between the world of imagination that is being created in the studio and the quotidian world of the characters. The characters playing the producer and the backer keep complaining that there is no plot. To which the director Jerzy replies that life does not have coherent plots, that things just happen, but it is art that can escape this grim cycle and is necessary for that reason.

Specific links between art and reality are seen at moments: the armed crusaders entering Constantinople are parallelled by the police suppressing the factory strike; the ship due to sail for Cythera is paired with a jet trail in the sky; the close-ups of Hanna in the motel are matched by zooms on to faces by Goya. Though life can be drab, full of tensions and misunderstandings, art can soar above it because it can convey pure emotion. As Godard said in 1982: «Sometimes one has to film emotion, to fill the screen with pure emotion. Only painting and music can achieve that.»

=== Light and dark ===
The opposition of light and dark first appears in the Night Watch, the first of the tableaux vivants, in the context of how light is distributed in the painting. Later on, during the Ingres episode, the two women Isabelle and Hanna are described by Jerzy as the opposition of night and day. According to him, Hanna is like the day, as she is opened towards everything, while Isabelle is like the night because she is difficult to reach.

The studio is the place governed by man-made light, whereas the places outside the studio are often shot in inadequate natural light. Yet the lighting of the tableaux vivants in the studio can never reach the qualities of pure natural light outside, and therefore remains artificial.

=== Love and work ===
The life of the characters is bound by the needs of love and of work, and the ways in which the two get mixed. Jerzy starts an affair with Hanna, owner of the motel where he is staying, and after a screen test wants her to be in his film as well. The industrial nature of the film studio is contrasted with the factory owned by Hanna's husband, at which Isabelle works. Isabelle even suggests that the repetitive movements of manufacturing mirror those of sex.

== Production ==
Outdoor shooting began at the end of November 1981 beside Lake Geneva at Nyon, followed by indoor shooting from January 1982 at Billancourt Studios in Paris. For both crew and cast, the director was extremely demanding. Sophie Loucachevsky, who played the production secretary, recalled: In the frost and the snow we waited outside in underclothes and nightdresses while Godard sat alone in a car and wept, clutching a teddy bear.

Godard had met the German actress Hanna Schygulla in Hollywood when she was shooting One from the Heart with Francis Ford Coppola and asked her to participate, sending her a three-page synopsis in English titled Passion: Work and Love. For the role of the director, his alter ego, Godard chose the Polish actor Jerzy Radziwiłowicz, well known from his work with Andrzej Wajda. To the French actress Isabelle Huppert he gave her the role of an unglamorous factory worker who is still a virgin, and added to her difficulties by requiring her to stutter.

Like most of Godard's work from this period, Passion is shot in colour with a 1.37 aspect ratio. Cinematographer Raoul Coutard, collaborating with Godard for the first time since 1967, won the Technical Grand Prize for cinematography at the 1982 Cannes Film Festival.

== Reception ==
Passion received a mixed critical response. While some critics praised its visual composition, use of classical music and painting, and experimental approach to narrative, others found the film excessively self-conscious and difficult.

Writing in Le Monde in 1982, Louis Marcorelles gave the film a strongly negative review, describing Passion as a "profoundly discouraging" work and criticizing what he saw as Godard's retreat into aestheticism. Marcorelles argued that the film was more concerned with "beauty" than with narrative or contemporary social reality, and concluded that its anxiety produced an ultimately insignificant work.

By contrast, Time Out praised the film's visual and intellectual qualities, noting that Godard "asks you to look everywhere at once" and describing its combination of sounds and images as something that "astonish the senses and tease the mind". The review particularly praised Raoul Coutard's cinematography and the film's recreation of paintings by artists including Goya, Ingres, Delacroix, Rembrandt and El Greco.

Later critics have continued to be divided over the film's experimental character. Vincent Canby of The New York Times described it as a "funny, fractured, totally self-absorbed movie", while Justine Smith wrote that, despite occasional longueurs, the film ultimately has "an air of celebration" in its combination of theory and poetry.

At the 1982 Cannes Film Festival, Passion competed for the Palme d'Or and received the Grand Prix de la Commission Supérieure Technique du cinéma français for its technical achievement.

On the review aggregator website Rotten Tomatoes, 63% of 8 critics' reviews are positive, with an average rating of 6.2/10.

The film had 20,294 admissions in France.

== See also ==
- Isabelle Huppert on screen and stage

== Bibliography ==
- Baecque, Antoine de. Godard - biographie. Paris: Grasset, 2010.
- Barck, Joanna. Hin zum Film – Zurück zu den Bildern. Bielefeld: Transcript Verlag, 2008.
- Dalle Vacche, Angela. Cinema and Painting- How Art is used in Film. London: Athlone Verlag, 1996.
- Heeling, Jennifer. Malerei und Film – Intermedialität. Saarbrücken: VDM Verlag, 2009.
- Paech, Joachim. Film, Fernsehen, Video und die Künste. Strategien der Intermedialität. Stuttgart: Verlag J.B. Metzler, 1994.
- Paech, Joachim, Passion oder die Einbildungen des Jean-Luc Godard. Frankfurt am Main: Deutsches Filmmuseum, 1989.
- Schönenbach, Richard. Bildende Kunst im Spielfilm. München: Scaneg Verlag, 2000.
