= Up, Down, Fragile =

- Theatrical release poster
- Directed by: Jacques Rivette
- Written by: Scenario: Laurence Côte; Marianne Denicourt; Nathalie Richard; Pascal Bonitzer; Christine Laurent; Jacques Rivette; Dialogue: Pascal Bonitzer; Christine Laurent
- Starring: Marianne Denicourt; Nathalie Richard; Laurence Côte; André Marcon; Bruno Todeschini
- Cinematography: Christophe Pollock
- Edited by: Nicole Lubtchansky
- Music by: François Bréant; Peter Lorne; Stéphane Vilar
- Distributed by: Pan Européenne Distribution
- Release date: 12 April 1995
- Running time: 169 minutes
- Country: France
- Language: French

Up, Down, Fragile (original title in French: Haut bas fragile) is a 1995 French film directed by Jacques Rivette. It was entered into the 19th Moscow International Film Festival. Interspersed with songs and dances, the film recounts the adventures of three young women in Paris, each at a turning point in her life.

== Plot ==
Three young women with very different values are in Paris on their own. The shy Ida, highly conscious that she is an adopted child, is starting her first job as a university librarian. The fragile Louise, daughter of a rich but crooked Swiss banker, is trying to find herself after years in a coma. The streetwise Ninon, a liar and a thief, has left her homicidal pimp to become a courier. As their stories unfold, their paths cross and the girls get involved with various people. Roland owns a set decorating business, Sarah is a night-club singer, and Lucien is a conscientious young private detective. Louise finds love with Lucien, who had been hired by her father to shadow her, and Roland may link up with Ninon. Ida is not yet ready for a man, because her first need is to find her birth mother, who may be Sarah.

== Cast ==
- Marianne Denicourt as Louise
- Nathalie Richard as Ninon
- Laurence Côte as Ida
- André Marcon as Roland
- Bruno Todeschini as Lucien
- Wilfred Benaïche as Alfredo
- Marcel Bozonnet as Man in the stairway
- Philippe Dormoy as Ninon's friend
- Enzo Enzo as the singer
- Pierre Lacan as recordshop seller
- Stéphanie Schwartzbrod as Lise
- Christine Vézinet as Estelle
- Anna Karina as Sarah
- László Szabó as Louise's father (voice)
- Alain Rigout as Ninon's victim

== Music used in the film ==
From the closing credits:

- Sung by Enzo Enzo:

Mes malles, Les naufragés volontaires, Rēve de compagnie, Une chanson à la Cole

- Sung by Anna Karina:

Mon amant perdu, La fille à l'envers

- Sung by Nathalie Richard and Marianne Denicourt:

Ni oui Ninon, L'escalier, Montsouris, Abracadabrantesque!

- Les loups:

Le thème des loups, Néanderthal, Kaleïdoscope
