= Jerzy Radziwiłowicz =

Polish actor (born 1950)

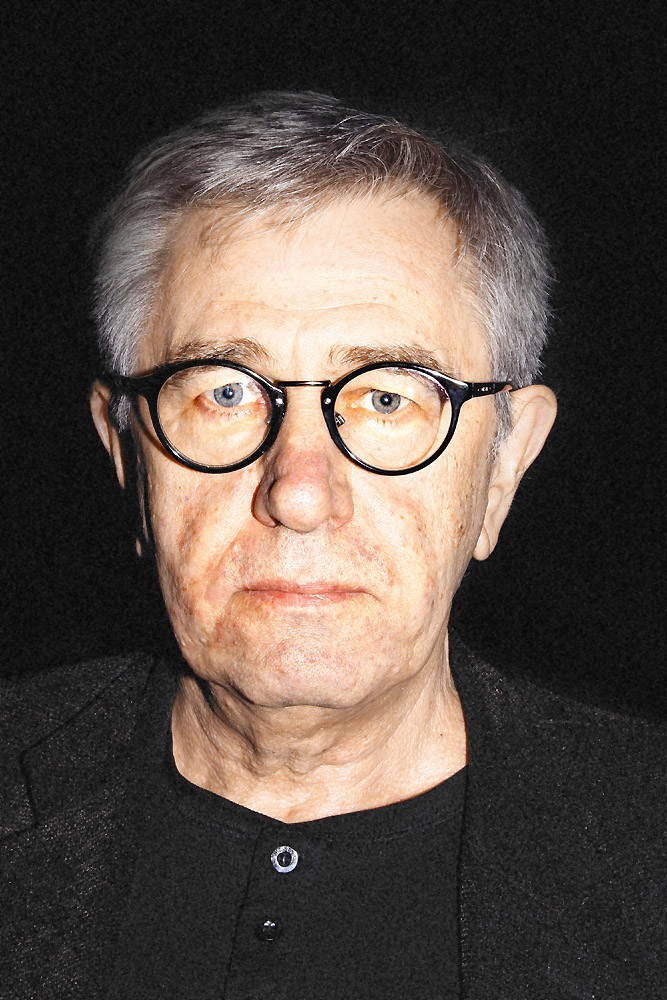
- Born: 8 September 1950 (age 75); Warsaw, Poland
- Occupation: Actor
- Years active: 1974-present

Jerzy Radziwiłowicz (Polish pronunciation: [ˈjɛʐɨ rad͡ʑiviˈwɔvit͡ʂ]; born 8 September 1950) is a Polish film actor. He is a graduate of the National Academy of Dramatic Art in Warsaw. He has appeared in 37 films since 1974.

== Selected filmography ==
- Man of Marble (1977)
- W biały dzień (1980) as “Korab”
- Man of Iron (1981)
- Le Grand Paysage d'Alexis Droeven (1981)
- Passion (1982)
- Dies rigorose Leben (1983)
- The Possessed (1988)
- The Seventh Chamber (1995)
- An Air So Pure (1997)
- Secret Defense (1998)
- Life as a Fatal Sexually Transmitted Disease (2000)
- The Story of Marie and Julien (2003)
- Aftermath (2012)
