= Rien sur Robert =

1999 French comedy drama film

- Directed by: Pascal Bonitzer
- Written by: Pascal Bonitze
- Produced by: Philippe Liégeois; Jean-Michel Rey
- Starring: Fabrice Luchini; Sandrine Kiberlain
- Cinematography: Christophe Pollock
- Edited by: Suzanne Koch
- Music by: Bruno Fontaine
- Distributed by: Rézo Films
- Release date: 13 February 1999 (BIFF)
- Running time: 107 minutes
- Country: France
- Language: French

Rien sur Robert is a 1999 French comedy-drama film directed by Pascal Bonitzer. Set in Paris and Thônes (a small town in the French Alps), the film follows the tribulations of Parisian writer and critic Didier Temple in the wake of the publication of his hostile review of a Bosnian film that he hasn't seen.

== Plot ==
Didier Temple is a middle-aged Parisian writer and critic. In disgrace following the publication of his hostile review of a Bosnian film he hasn't actually seen (echoing the real-life Kusturica / Finkielkraut affair), Didier begins to suspect that he is being followed by a man he has noticed a number of times in the neighbourhood.

Didier's girlfriend Juliette has just been fired from her job. She meets Didier at his office to go see the Bosnian film he'd panned. On the way to the cinema they argue, and Juliette declares that she intends to sleep with the next man who comes along. Approaching a stranger on a park bench in the Jardin du Luxembourg, she asks for a cigarette. They argue, insulting one another, and he leaves. Didier and Juliette argue further, and she storms off.

Didier's friend Martin works in a local bookshop. Martin arranges for Didier to attend a dinner at the home of Ariel Chatwick-West, a writer and academic, saying that he admires Didier's work. Didier asks Martin to find a job for Juliette.

Arriving at the dinner by car, Didier is received by the hostess, Ariane Morgenstern, who seems surprised to see him. She takes his coat and offers him a drink, which he refuses. While Didier waits, the man Didier suspects has been following him arrives, and is introduced as Jérôme Sauveur, a younger, better dressed, and more accomplished rival. Feeling unwell, Didier retreats to the bathroom, hits his head on a beam, and blacks out. Ariane discovers him some time later, and urges him to join them at the dinner table. At dinner, it quickly becomes clear that Didier's invitation was the result of a misunderstanding. Denounced as a moral and intellectual bankrupt by Chatwick-West, Didier leaves, then realises that he has forgotten his raincoat and car keys. Looking for the cloakroom, he encounters Chatwick-West's god-daughter Aurélie, a beautiful, intense, troubled young woman. As she attempts to seduce Didier, Chatwick-West bursts in. Didier flees, returning for his raincoat.

Didier and Juliette meet at a café. She describes in detail and with relish a recent sexual encounter with Alain de Xantras, the man she'd approached in the park. They argue, and Didier demands that she return his keys. She does so, and leaves. Didier pursues her into the street, and is hit by a car. While recuperating in hospital, he receives a visit from Jérôme Sauveur who hands him a card from Aurélie. They meet at her mother's apartment where she shows him a drawing by Félicien Rops, and they begin a sexual relationship. As Didier leaves, Aurélie tells him that she is his, body and soul.

To celebrate his recovery, Didier throws a small party at his apartment. Juliette arrives unannounced, saying that she is unhappy, that she loves him, and that she has nothing in common with Alain. When Didier admits that he still has feelings for her, she asks him not to kiss her, and leaves to go to the opera with Alain. Arguing with his parents and younger brother, Didier leaves to pick up Aurélie. They drive through the night, arriving the next morning at Thônes, a village in the French Alps where Jérôme Sauveur has a house. While Aurélie bathes, Didier receives a call from Juliette who has obtained the number of their hotel from Didier's brother. Telling him that she has broken up with Alain, she says that she intends to take the overnight train from Paris. Didier admits that he still loves her.

The following morning, Didier and Juliette are joined by Sauveur and his partner Violaine at the hotel. Violaine spies Aurélie from the balcony, and the five of them meet for a drink on the terrace, where Aurélie has an attack of renal colic, a consequence of a previous suicide attempt. Late that night Didier and Aurélie are together in her room when Sauveur bursts in. Sauveur and Aurélie argue, and it becomes clear that they have previously had a relationship. Aurélie produces a revolver, daring Sauveur to use it, then drives him from the room.

Early next morning, Juliette announces her intention to return to Paris to be with Alain, and asks Didier for a cheque to cover the train fare. Aurélie is on the same train, and the two women discuss Didier. Aurélie confesses that she fantasises about being burnt alive in public. When Juliette suggests a comparison with Joan of Arc, Aurélie points out that Joan was innocent, while she, Aurélie, deserves to be burnt.

Back in Paris, Didier visits Aurélie at her apartment. Arriving later than planned, he finds her distraught. Initially amorous, she grows hostile and throws him out, saying that she wants to be alone. When, the following day, he tries to call her, he discovers that she had taken an overdose. Visiting her in hospital he is confronted by her mother as well as Chatwick-West and other figures from the dinner who insist that Didier end his involvement with her. Returning to the hospital having examined his conscience, Didier tells Aurélie that he does not love her.

Approaching the bookshop where Juliette is now working, Didier is dismayed to see Sauveur emerging from his car. Sauveur is to give a paper at a conference in Florence, and Juliette has agreed to accompany him. They argue, and Juliette leaves with Sauveur. The car stops suddenly, and Juliette runs back to Didier, saying "I'm with you. I hate him." She then returns to Sauveur's car, and they depart.

== Cast ==
- Fabrice Luchini - Didier Temple
- Sandrine Kiberlain - Juliette Sauvage
- Valentina Cervi - Aurélie Coquille
- Laurent Lucas - Jérôme Sauveur
- Michel Piccoli - Lord Ariel Chatwick-West
- Édouard Baer - Alain de Xantras
- Nathalie Boutefeu - Violaine Rachat
- Bernadette Lafont - Mme Sauvage
- Denis Podalydès - Martin
- Pascal Bonitzer - bookshop customer
