= Laurence Côte =

French actress and writer

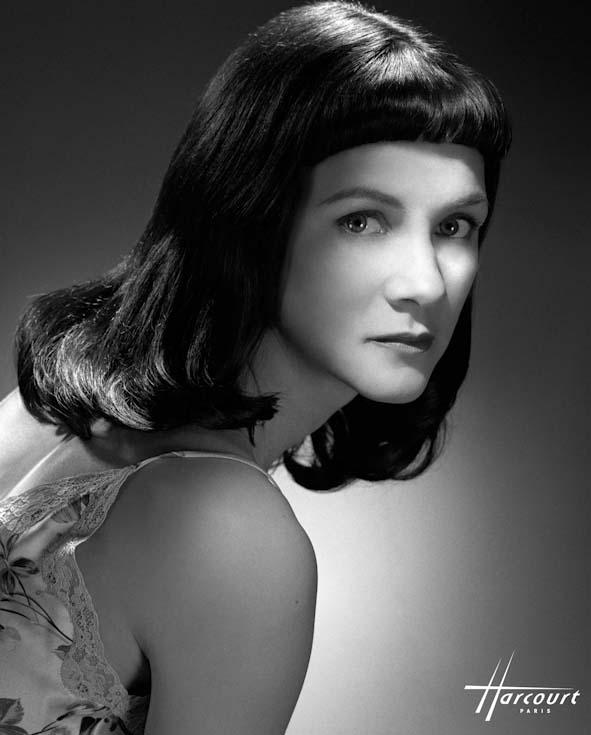
Laurence Côte photographed by Studio Harcourt Paris

Laurence Côte (born 11 February 1966) is a French actress and writer. She has appeared in such films as Thieves, Up, Down, Fragile and Gang of Four.
