= Secret Defense (1998 film) =

1998 French drama film by Jacques Rivette

- Directed by: Jacques Rivette
- Written by: Pascal Bonitzer; Emmanuelle Cuau; Jacques Rivette
- Produced by: Martine Marignac; Maurice Tinchant
- Starring: Sandrine Bonnaire; Jerzy Radziwilowicz; Grégoire Colin
- Cinematography: William Lubtchansky
- Edited by: Nicole Lubtchansky
- Music by: Jordi Savall
- Distributed by: Pierre Grise Distribution
- Release date: 1998
- Running time: 170 minutes
- Country: France
- Language: French
- Box office: $268,177

Secret Defense (French: Secret défense) is a 1998 French drama film directed by Jacques Rivette.

== Cast ==
- Sandrine Bonnaire as Sylvie Rousseau
- Jerzy Radziwilowicz as Walser
- Grégoire Colin as Paul, Sylvie's brother
- Laure Marsac as Véronique / Ludivine
- Françoise Fabian as Geneviève, Sylvie's mother
- Christine Vouilloz as Myriam

== Reception ==
On review aggregator website Rotten Tomatoes, the film holds an approval rating of 85% based on 13 reviews, with an average rating of 7.0/10.
