= Jean-Christophe Bouvet =

French actor, director and screenwriter (born 1947)

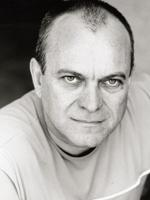
- Born: 24 March 1947 (age 79); Paris, France
- Occupations: Actor, film director, screenwriter
- Years active: 1969–present

Jean-Christophe Bouvet (French pronunciation: [ʒɑ̃ kʁistɔf buvɛ]; born 24 March 1947) is a French actor, director and screenwriter. Best known in his homeland for his role as General Edmond Bertineau in Luc Besson's Taxi film series, he gained international fame for his appearance as designer Pierre Cadault in Darren Star's Emily in Paris television series.

== Biography ==
Jean-Christophe Bouvet took drama classes under Jean-Laurent Cochet at the Théâtre Édouard VII. He also studied film, linguistics, and psychoanalysis at Paris VIII University. During this time, he met André Téchiné and Claude Chabrol, subsequently becoming their assistant director. He worked simultaneously as an actor, assistant director, and writer.

He landed his first major role in Paul Vecchiali's La Machine (1977), portraying a man sentenced to death for the murder of a child. He had previously collaborated with the director on the controversial film Change pas de main, released on 18 June 1975. The film received an 18+ rating due to numerous unsimulated sex scenes, including a sequence featuring a close-up of Bouvet during a group sex scene.

In 1989, he served as the model for L'Origine de la guerre ("The Origin of War"), an artwork by Orlan.

Bouvet is particularly known for portraying disturbing or shady characters, such as Pierre Lentier, the murderer in La Machine; Satan, depicted as a perverse and complex horse dealer in the Bernanos-Pialat adaptation Under the Sun of Satan; and Jean-Paul Martoni, the corrupt politician in La Cité de la peur. He has appeared in a wide variety of films, ranging from the radical auteur cinema of Jean-Claude Biette to mainstream productions by Luc Besson. In 2016, he played Gauthier, a caustic and herd-minded salesman, in Pierre Léon's Deux Rémi, deux. In 2017, he played a shifty, homosexual innkeeper in Jours de France, the debut feature film by Jérôme Reybaud. In 2018, he played Tonton, an old sage fond of yoga, in Jean-Claude Brisseau's Que le diable nous emporte.

Described by film director and critic Louis Skorecki as the "greatest actor in the world", Jean-Christophe Bouvet is also considered by Serge Kaganski to be the "Jean-Pierre Léaud of the post-New Wave generation".

== Filmography ==
=== As actor ===
- 1969: La philosophie dans le boudoir as Le grand prêtre
- 1975: Change pas de main as Alain
- 1977: The Machine (directed by Paul Vecchiali) as Pierre Lentier
- 1977: Le théâtre des matières (directed by Jean-Claude Biette) as Christophe
- 1980: That's Life as Richard
- 1980: Le borgne
- 1981: Loin de Manhattan as Christian
- 1983: Archipel des amours as Le travelo (segment "Masculins singuliers")
- 1983: At the Top of the Stairs as Un snob à l'exposition
- 1987: Sous le soleil de Satan (directed by Maurice Pialat) as Le maquignon
- 1991: J'embrasse pas (directed by André Téchiné) as Le client au bois
- 1992: Savage Nights (Les Nuits fauves) (directed by Cyril Collard) as Serge
- 1992: Krapatchouk as Ministre
- 1994: La Cité de la peur directed by Alain Berbérian) as Jean-Paul Martoni, le député du R.E.P.N.
- 1994: L'Eau froide directed by Olivier Assayas) as Professeur
- 1994: Le terminus de Rita
- 1995: Le rocher d'Acapulco as Le maître de cérémonie
- 1995: Le complexe de Toulon (directed by Jean-Claude Biette) as Chris Patsch
- 1996: Le contre-ciel
- 1997: Vicious Circles (directed by Sandy Whitelaw) as Le Notaire
- 1998: Le Plaisir (et ses petits tracas) as Bob, le dealer
- 1998: L'examen de minuit as Le Vendeur du Manoir
- 1999: Gloria (directed by Manuela Viegas) as Vicente
- 1999: Les passagers (directed by Jean-Claude Guiguet) as Le Voyageur
- 1999: Recto/Verso as Maître Maillard
- 1999: Lovers as Le Kiosquier
- 1999: Le domaine
- 2000: Taxi 2 (directed by Gérard Krawczyk) as Général Edmond Bertineau
- 2000: Lise et André (directed by Denis Dercourt) as Charles
- 2000: La chambre obscure
- 2001: Folle de Rachid en transit sur Mars (segment "Eléphants de la planète Mars, Les")
- 2001: La boîte (directed by Claude Zidi) as Bloret
- 2001: Off to the Revolution by a 2CV as Capo inpresa polizia
- 2001: Being Light as Hotel clerk
- 2002: Jojo la frite (directed by Nicolas Cuche) as Benz
- 2002: Les naufragés de la D17 (directed by Luc Moullet) as Le sergent chef
- 2002: Le nouveau Jean-Claude as Le directeur du grand magasin
- 2002: The Red Siren (directed by Olivier Megaton) as Lucas
- 2003: Taxi 3 (directed by Gérard Krawczyk) as Général Edmond Bertineau
- 2003: Saltimbank (directed by Jean-Claude Biette) as Bruno Saltim
- 2004: À vot' bon coeur as Le vice-président de la Commission de l'Avance sur Recettes
- 2004: Notre musique (directed by Jean-Luc Godard) as C. Maillard
- 2004: Courts mais GAY: Tome 8 as Le père (segment "Prisonnier")
- 2004: Mensonges et trahisons et plus si affinités... (directed by Laurent Tirard) as L'éditeur
- 2005: Comme un frère as L'admirateur
- 2005: Journal IV
- 2006: L'Ivresse du pouvoir (directed by Claude Chabrol) as Me Parlebas
- 2006: Les Brigades du Tigre (directed by Jérôme Cornuau) as Le juge au procès
- 2006: Marie-Antoinette (directed by Sofia Coppola) as Duc de Choiseul
- 2006: Il sera une fois (directed by Sandrine Veysset) as Henri, le père de Pierrot
- 2006: Chacun sa nuit (directed by Pascal Arnold et Jean-Marc Barr) as Vincent Sylvaire
- 2006: La vie privée (directed by Mehdi Ben Attia et Zina Modiano) as Jean-Emmanuel
- 2006: Le prestige de la mort as Maître chanteur
- 2006: Lisa et le pilote d'avion (directed by Philippe Barassat) as Le pilote
- 2007: Taxi 4 as Général Edmond Bertineau
- 2007: La France as Elias
- 2007: Capitaine Achab as Le roi d'Angletere
- 2007: L'Auberge rouge as Maître Rouget
- 2008: Des Indes à la planète Mars as M. Senn
- 2009: La famille Wolberg as Maurice, le médecin
- 2009: Cinéman as Monsieur Coq - le proviseur
- 2009: The Beast (La bête)
- 2010: L'autre Dumas as M. Bocquin
- 2010: Black Venus as Charles Mercailler, le journaliste
- 2010: Belleville-Tokyo as Jean-Loup
- 2011: Cat Run as Dobber
- 2011: Let My People Go! as Commissaire
- 2011: Notre Paradis as Le premier client
- 2012: Paris by Night as L'hôte au Café Carmen
- 2012: Désordres as Le proviseur
- 2012: Les Rencontres d'après minuit as Brigadier chef / Chief Brigadier
- 2013: Gare du Nord as Juriste
- 2013: Hasta mañana as Jean-Louis
- 2015: Deux Rémi, deux as Gauthier
- 2016: Jours de France as L'homme de Savoie
- 2016: Where Horses Go To Die (directed by Antony Hickling) as Daniel
- 2016: Sélection officielle as Jean-Michel Bitume
- 2017: We Are Tourists as Jacky
- 2017: Des amours, désamour as Le père de Manon
- 2018: Que le diable nous emporte as Tonton
- 2018: La légende as Président Rousseleau
- 2018: L'oeuf dure as Lui-même
- 2020: La rupture as Jean
- 2020: Emily in Paris as Pierre Cadault
- 2021: Down in Paris as Robert
- 2026 Everything I Said I Wasn't (directed by Antony Hickling) as JC Bouvet
