= Stéphanie Michelini =

French actor

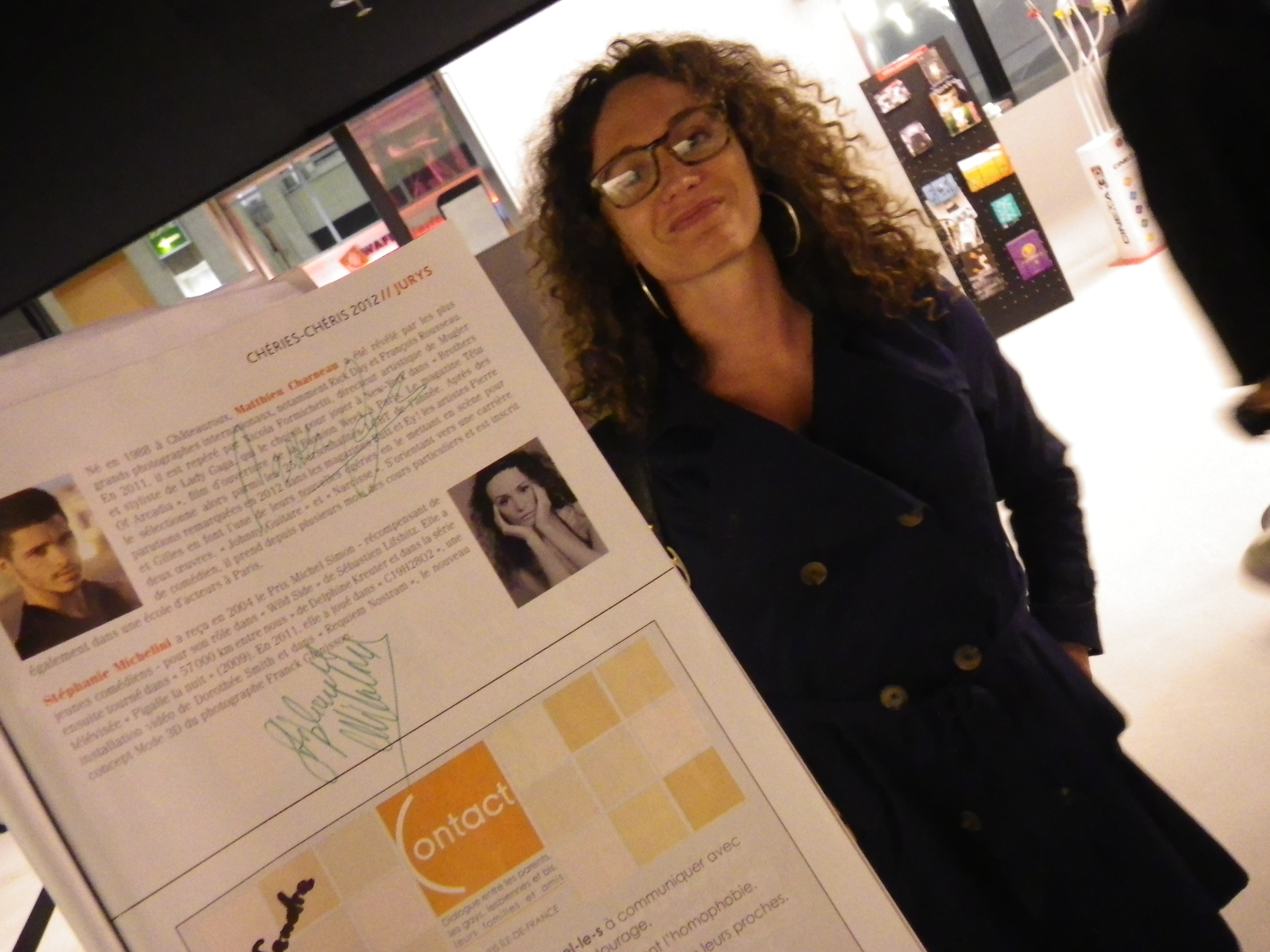
- Michelini at the 2012 Chéries-Chéris Film Festival in Paris
- Occupation: Actress
- Years active: 2004–present
- Notable work: Wild Side
- Website: http://stephmichelini.free.fr/

Stéphanie Michelini is a French actress.

== Career ==
Michelini debuted in 2004, playing the leading role in the film Wild Side, directed by Sébastien Lifshitz. For this role, she won the Prix Michel-Simon for Best Actress.

She is one of the few trans women to have obtained some roles in French television and cinema, which still entrusts the majority of transgender roles to cisgender actors. Michelini had auditioned for the title role of the series Louis(e), however, Claire Nebout was cast in the part.

She took part in a video installation of the artist SMITH, titled C_{19}H_{28}O_{2} (Agnès), as well as in SMITH's medium-length film Spectrographies, which she filmed with Mathieu Amalric at Père-Lachaise.

In 2019, she starred with actress Myriam Boyer in the short film Traverser la nuit, directed by Johann G. Louis. She won an Honorable Mention award for the role at the Two Riversides Film and Art Festival in Poland in 2020.

== Other activities ==
Michelini was a member of the jury for the Chéries-Chéris film festival in 2012.

== Filmography ==
- 2004: Wild Side: Stéphanie
- 2008: 57,000 Kilometers Between Us: Nicole
- 2009: Pigalle, la nuit (television series): Erika
- 2011: C_{19}H_{28}O_{2} (Agnès): Agnès
- 2013: Little Gay Boy: Convive
- 2013: Holy Thursday (The Last Supper): Convive
- 2014: One Deep Breath by Antony Hickling: Patricia
- 2015: Spectrographies: L'interlocutrice
- 2016: Where Horses Go to Die: Prostitute
- 2019: Traverser la nuit: Daphné
