= Michel Robin =

French actor (1930–2020)

- Born: 13 November 1930; Reims, Marne, France
- Died: 18 November 2020 (aged 90); Rambouillet, Yvelines, France
- Occupation: Actor
- Years active: 1966–2018

Michel Robin (13 November 1930 – 18 November 2020) was a French film, stage, and television actor. A sociétaire of the Comédie-Française since 1996, he also appeared in 120 films from 1966 to 2018. He won several awards for his acting, including the Moliere Award for Best Supporting Actor and the Grand Jury Prize winner at the Locarno Festival in 1979.

== Filmography ==
Year	Title	Role	Director	Notes
1966	Who Are You, Polly Maggoo?		William Klein	
1967	L'une et l'autre		René Allio	
1968	Les secrets de la mer rouge	The bailiff		TV series (1 episode)
1968	Les dossiers de l'agence O	Barbet	Jean Salvy, Marc Simenon	TV series (12 episodes)
1968	L'astragale	Pierre	Guy Casaril	
1968	Les grandes espérances	The postilion	Marcel Cravenne	TV movie
1969	Délire à deux	The neighbor	Michel Mitrani	TV movie
1969	Café du square		Louis Daquin	TV series (2 episodes)
1970	The Confession	The accuser	Costa-Gavras	
1970	Irmãos Coragem	Alberto		TV series (1 episode)
1970	Un otage	The volunteer of I.R.A.	Marcel Cravenne (2)	TV movie
1970	Le mur de l'Atlantique	The shoemaker	Marcel Camus	
1970	Alice au pays des merveilles	Fantasy-turtle	Jean-Christophe Averty	TV movie
1970	Brigitte C. Six		Jean-Claude Huisman	Short
1971	Les nouvelles aventures de Vidocq	Ploche	Marcel Bluwal	TV series (1 episode)
1971	Don't Deliver Us from Evil	Léon	Joël Séria	
1971	Ubu enchaîné	Pissembock	Jean-Christophe Averty (2)	TV movie
1971	La coqueluche	The controller	Christian-Paul Arrighi	
1971	Le songe d'une nuit d'été	Down-and-hunger	Jean-Christophe Averty (3)	TV movie
1972	Les cent livres des hommes	Tsiganok		TV series (1 episode)
1972	Quelque part quelqu'un	The depressed patient	Yannick Bellon	
1972	Le petit poucet	The woodcutter	Michel Boisrond	
1973	La porteuse de pain	Firmin	Marcel Camus (2)	TV mini-series (1 episode)
1973	The Dominici Affair	Perrin	Claude Bernard-Aubert	
1973	Wielka milosc Balzaka		Wojciech Solarz	TV mini-series
1973	The Invitation	Remy Placet	Claude Goretta	
1973	Les Mohicans de Paris	Barthelemy	Gilles Grangier	TV series
1973	The Mad Adventures of Rabbi Jacob	The monk	Gérard Oury	
1973	Molière pour rire et pour pleurer	The soldier	Marcel Camus (3)	TV mini-series
1974	Black Thursday	The cousin	Michel Mitrani (2)	
1974	L'ange de la rivière morte	Surlot	Edouard Logereau	TV movie
1974	L'homme au contrat	Léoni	Jacques Audoir	TV series
1974	Verdict	Véricel	André Cayatte	
1974	Erica Minor	The man with the mistress	Bertrand Van Effenterre	
1974	Jean Pinot, médecin d'aujourd'hui	Father Georges Videau	Michel Fermaud	TV series
1974	Ardéchois-coeur-fidèle	Louvigny	Jean-Pierre Gallo	TV mini-series
1974	Le beau samedi		Renaud Walter	Short
1975	That Most Important Thing: Love	Raymond Lapade	Andrzej Żuławski	
1975	Pas si méchant que ça	François	Claude Goretta (2)	
1975	Les prétendants de Madame Berrou	The teacher	Hervé Baslé	TV movie
1975	Pays	Henri	Jacques Krier	TV movie
1975	Cécile ou La Raison des femmes: Vivre à deux	The father	Hervé Baslé (2), Youri	TV mini-series
1975	La traque	Chamond	Serge Leroy	
1975	Un sac de billes	Mantelier	Jacques Doillon	
1975	Splendeurs et misères des courtisanes	Contenson	Maurice Cazeneuve	TV mini-series
1975	Cyrus le violoncelliste	The uncle	Fabrice Cazeneuve	Short
1976	I Am Pierre Riviere	The father	Christine Lipinska	
1976	Première neige	Gustave	Claude Santelli	TV movie
1976	L'éducation amoureuse de Valentin	Monsieur Bertand	Jean L'Hôte	
1976	The Toy	The domestic	Francis Veber	
1976	Les enquêtes du commissaire Maigret	Xavier Marton	Jean-Louis Muller	TV series (1 episode)
1977	The Old Fox	Eric Finberg	José Giovanni	TV series (1 episode)
1977	Le coeur froid	Xavuer	Henri Helman	
1977	Les héritiers	Dédé	Roger Pigaut	TV series (1 episode)
1977	Le point de mire	Little Louis	Jean-Claude Tramont	
1977	Cinéma 16	Mardigras	Bernard Dubois	TV series (1 episode)
1978	Holiday Hotel	Léonce	Michel Lang	
1978	La vigne à Saint-Roman	Philémon	Jean Pradinas	TV movie
1978	Les procès témoins de leur temps	Joseph	Jean Cazenave	TV series (1 episode)
1978	Les Cinq Dernières Minutes	René Flamand	Claude Loursais	TV series (1 episode)
1978	Messieurs les ronds de cuir	Sainthomme	Daniel Ceccaldi	TV movie
1979	Les petites fugues	Pipe	Yves Yersin	Locarno International Film Festival - Bronze Leopard
1979	Un si joli village	Gaspard	Étienne Périer	
1979	Le troisième couteau	Rodolphe	Robert Valey	TV movie
1979	Le grand inquisiteur	The Grand Inquisitor	Raoul Sangla	TV movie
1979	Womanlight	The doctor	Costa-Gavras (2)	
1979	Jean le Bleu	M. La Reine	Hélène Martin	TV movie
1979	Les petits soirs	Father Gobert	Raoul Sangla (2)	TV movie
1979	Une femme dans la ville	Paul Piegu	Joannick Desclers	TV movie
1980	Le barbier de Séville	Don Bazile	Jean Pignol	TV movie
1980	Le petit théâtre d'Antenne 2	Anatole	Jean Brard	TV series (2 episodes)
1980	The Horse of Pride	The Marquis	Claude Chabrol	
1980	La femme enfant	The father	Raphaële Billetdoux	
1980	Two Lions in the Sun	The man in the park	Claude Faraldo	
1980	Les dossiers de l'écran	The monarchist	Alexandre Astruc	TV series (1 episode)
1980	Bobo la tête	Simon	Gilles Katz	
1980	Cinéma 16	Vincent	Bruno Gantillon	TV series (1 episode)
1981	Caméra une première	The watchmaker	Antoine Gallien	TV series (1 episode)
1981	Le mythomane	The concierge	Michel Wyn	TV series (1 episode)
1981	La vie des autres	Uncle Louis	Jean-Pierre Prévost	TV series (1 episode)
1981	Le voyage du Hollandais	The traveler	Charles Brabant	TV movie
1981	Histoire contemporaine	The Abbot Guitrel	Michel Boisrond (2)	TV mini-series
1981	La Chèvre	Alexandre Bens	Francis Veber (2)	
1981	On demande grand-père gentil	M. Robert	Gisèle Braunberger	TV Short
1982	Nestor Burma, détective de choc	Florimont Faroux	Jean-Luc Miesch	
1982	La sorcière	Archbishop	Charles Brabant (2)	TV movie
1982	Le canard sauvage	The old Ekdal	Guy Lessertisseur	TV movie
1982	De bien étranges affaires	Baldouine	Jean-Luc Miesch (2)	TV series (1 episode)
1982	La saisie		Yves-Noël François	Short
1982	Casting		Arthur Joffé	
1983	The Death of Mario Ricci	Fernand Blondel	Claude Goretta (3)	
1983	Fraggle Rock	Doc	Jim Henson	TV series (French version only)
1983	Une pierre dans la bouche	Victor	Jean-Louis Leconte	
1983	Le Marginal	Alfred Gonet	Jacques Deray	
1984	The Blood of Others	Raoul	Claude Chabrol (2)	
1984	I cani di Gerusalemme	The bishop	Fabio Carpi	TV movie
1984	Machinations	Professor Poinsard	Bruno Gantillon (2)	TV series
1984	Une rébellion à Romans	A notable	Philippe Venault	
1984	La reverdie	Morelle	Philippe Condroyer	TV series
1985	Gwen, or the Book of Sand	Roseline	Jean-François Laguionie	
1985	L'amour en douce	Gabriel	Édouard Molinaro	
1985	Drôle de samedi	The dentist client	Tunç Okan	
1985	L'amour ou presque	The service station's owner	Patrice Gautier	
1985	Harem	Monsieur Raoul	Arthur Joffé (2)	
1985	Les enquêtes du commissaire Maigret	François Lagrange	Jean Brard (2)	TV series (1 episode)
1986	Marie Love	Le Nez	Jean-Pierre Richard	TV movie
1986	Samedi, dimanche, lundi	Antonio	Yves-André Hubert	TV movie
1986	Nanou	Monsieur Henri	Conny Templeman	
1986	Cinéma 16	Sébastien	Franck Apprederis	TV series (1 episode)
1987	Les enquêtes du commissaire Maigret	Moers	Georges Ferraro	TV series (1 episode)
1987	Storms in May	Pfarrer	Xaver Schwarzenberger	TV movie
1987	La villa du cap		Laurent de Bartillat	Short
1989	La nuit de l'eclusier	Charles Belloz	Franz Rickenbach	
1989	Les Maris, les Femmes, les Amants	Tocanier	Pascal Thomas	
1989	Marquis	Ambert	Henri Xhonneux	
1989	Les nuits révolutionnaires	The igniter	Charles Brabant (3)	TV mini-series
1990	Stan the Flasher	The detainee	Serge Gainsbourg	
1990	Série rose		Alain Schwartzstein	TV series (1 episode)
1991	Toto the Hero	Old Alfred	Jaco Van Dormael	
1991	Crimes et jardins	Georges	Jean-Paul Salomé	TV movie
1992	Mes coquins	Victor	Jean-Daniel Verhaeghe	TV movie
1992	Les Enfants du naufrageur	Paul	Jérôme Foulon	
1992	L'affût	Marcel	Yannick Bellon (2)	
1992	Le cerf-volant	The uncle	Jean-Paul Roux	TV movie
1992	La gamine	Georges	Hervé Palud	
1992	Séparément vôtre	Félix	Michel Boisrond (3)	TV movie
1992	Le voyage d'Eva	Albert	Patrice Gautier (2)	TV movie
1993	Meurtre en ut majeur	President Boissière	Michel Boisrond (4)	TV movie
1993-2002	Les Deschiens	Various	Jérôme Deschamps, Macha Makeïeff	TV series
1994	L'affaire	Charles Rivette	Sergio Gobbi	
1994	Regards d'enfance	Hubert	Jean-Paul Salomé (2)	TV series (1 episode)
1995	L'amour conjugal	Abraham Vivien	Benoît Barbier	
1997	Langevin: le secret	Roger Loustalot	Patrick Jamain	TV movie
1997	Les précieuses ridicules	Jodelet	Georges Bensoussan	TV movie
1998	Restons groupés	Raymond	Jean-Paul Salomé (3)	
1998	The Pianist	Floreal	Mario Gas	
1998	Le sélec	Raymond	Jean-Claude Sussfeld	TV series (1 episode)
1998	Vidange		Jean-Pierre Mocky	
1999	Anne Le Guen	Landau	Alain Wermus	TV series (1 episode)
1999	Children of the Century	Larive	Diane Kurys	
1999	Le mariage forcé	Géronimo	Stéphane Bertin	TV movie
1999-2006	Boulevard du Palais	Isy Scalzman	Jacques Malaterre, Frédéric Auburtin,...	TV series (15 episodes)
2000	De l'histoire ancienne	M. Santucci	Orso Miret	
2000	Merci pour le chocolat	Dufreigne	Claude Chabrol (3)	
2001	Amélie	Mr. Collignon	Jean-Pierre Jeunet	
2001	L'emmerdeuse	M. Jérôme	Michaël Perrotta	TV series
2001	Le bourgeois gentilhomme	Monsieur Jourdain	Yves-André Hubert (2)	TV movie
2003	Gomez & Tavarès		Gilles Paquet-Brenner	
2003	The Triplets of Belleville	Voice	Sylvain Chomet	
2003	Le dindon	Gérôme	Don Kent	TV movie
2004	La cliente	M. Adret	Pierre Boutron	TV movie
2004	L'île de Black Mór	Forbes	Jean-François Laguionie (2)	
2004	Le voyageur sans bagage	Me Huspar	Pierre Boutron (2)	TV movie
2004	Aquarium	Georges Marconi	Frédéric Grousset	
2004	Par l'odeur alléché...	A croupier	Jean Mach	
2004	A Very Long Engagement	The old man on the battlefield	Jean-Pierre Jeunet (2)	
2005	Bien dégagé derrière les oreilles	Father Galichain	Anne Deluz	TV movie
2005	Désiré Landru	Landru's father	Pierre Boutron (3)	TV movie
2005	Granny Boom	Colonel	Christiane Lehérissey	TV movie
2007	Merci, les enfants vont bien!	The server	Stéphane Clavier	TV series (1 episode)
2007	Dombais et fils	Salomon	Laurent Jaoui	TV movie
2007	Cyrano de Bergerac	The bourgeois	Andy Sommer	TV movie
2009	Eden Is West	The Lido's doorman	Costa-Gavras (3)	
2011	Les aventures de Philibert, capitaine puceau	Fillanchiaux	Sylvain Fusée	
2012	Farewell, My Queen	Jacob-Nicolas Moreau	Benoît Jacquot	
2012	Whiskied Out	Grand father	Sophie Beaulieu	Short
2012	Granny's Funeral	M. Salvini	Bruno Podalydès	
2012	You Ain't Seen Nothin' Yet	The server	Alain Resnais	
2013	Je vous présente ma femme	Alphonse	Élisabeth Rappeneau	TV movie
2013	Louis la brocante	Gustave Bonneville	Véronique Langlois	TV series (2 episodes)
2014	La forêt		Arnaud Desplechin	TV movie
2015	Meurtres à Collioure	Fernand Sarda	Bruno Garcia	TV movie
2015	L'Odeur de la mandarine	The priest	Gilles Legrand	
2018	Just a Breath Away (Dans la brume)		Daniel Roby	
