= Frig (film) =

2018 French film

- Directed by: Antony Hickling
- Written by: Antony Hickling
- Produced by: H&A films
- Starring: Biño Sauitzvy
- Cinematography: Laure Cornet, Antony Hickling
- Edited by: Victor Toussaint
- Music by: Loki Starfish
- Distributed by: Optimale France
- Release date: 2018
- Running time: 60 minutes
- Country: France
- Language: French

Frig is a French experimental film directed by Antony Hickling in 2018. The film was premiered at the Etrange Festival in Paris at the Forum des images. Frig had a cinema release at St André des Arts cinema in Paris, France 2018.

== Plot ==
Frig is divided into three parts (Love, Shit and Sperm) and is presented as an experimental fiction beginning at the end of a romantic relationship. The film is the third and final part of the trilogy by Antony Hickling, consisting of Little Gay Boy, Where Horses Go to Die and concluding with Frig. The film was inspired by 120 Days of Sodom by Marquis de Sade.

== Cast ==
- Biño Sauitzvy
- Magali Gaudou
- Luc Bruyere
- Christine Mingo
- Thomas Laroppe
- Gaëtan Vettier
- Arthur Gillet
- André Schneider

== Awards ==
- The Trilogy (Where Horses Go To Die, Little Gay Boy, & Frig) receives the Christian Petermann award for an innovative work. Controversial scenarios expressed through music, dance and daring at the IV DIGO – Goias Sexual diversity and gender international Film Festival, Brazil, 2019
- Special Mention for his work as a director at Rio FICG, Brazil, 2015
