= Hélène Surgère =

French actress (1928–2011)

- Born: 20 October 1928; Caudéran, Bordeaux, France
- Died: 26 March 2011 (aged 82); Paris, France
- Occupation: Actress

Hélène Surgère (20 October 1928 – 26 March 2011) was a French actress, whose career spanned over 40 years.

== Life and career ==
Born in Caudéran into a bourgeois family, while running an art ceramics store in Montmartre, Surgère attended acting classes at Cours Simon, and shortly later started working in amateur dramatics.

Surgère's film career was launched by Paul Vecchiali, who discovered her through a photonovel. She later appeared in numerous films by Vecchiali, to the point of being regarded as his muse. During her career she also worked with other prominent European directors including Pier Paolo Pasolini, James Ivory, Claude Lelouch, Patrice Leconte, André Téchiné, Claude Berri, Jacques Demy and Raoul Ruiz. In 2010, she became a member of the Comédie-Française.

Surgère died in her sleep on 26 March 2011, at the age of 82.

== Selected filmography ==
- French Provincial (1975)
- Salò, or the 120 Days of Sodom (1975)
- Barocco (1976)
- The Machine (1977)
- The Brontë Sisters (1979)
- La femme enfant (1980)
- That's Life (1980)
- At the Top of the Stairs (1983)
- Attention bandits! (1987)
- Three Seats for the 26th (1988)
- Australia (1989)
- The Bet (1997)
- Time Regained (1999)
- My Life on Ice (2002)
- That Day (2003)
- Le Divorce (2003)
- Intimate Strangers (2004)
- Hunting and Gathering (2007)
