= Beaumarchais (film) =

- Directed by: Édouard Molinaro
- Written by: Édouard Molinaro; Jean-Claude Brisville; Sacha Guitry (play)
- Produced by: Charles Gassot
- Starring: Fabrice Luchini; Sandrine Kiberlain; Manuel Blanc; Michel Aumont
- Narrated by: Pierre Arditi
- Cinematography: Michael Epp
- Edited by: Véronique Parnet
- Music by: Jean-Claude Petit
- Production companies: France 2 France 3 StudioCanal
- Distributed by: BAC Films
- Release date: 30 August 1996
- Running time: 116 minutes
- Country: France
- Language: French
- Budget: $14.5 million
- Box office: $37.9 million

Beaumarchais (French: Beaumarchais l'insolent), also known as Beaumarchais the Scoundrel, is a 1996 French biopic film directed by Édouard Molinaro and starring Fabrice Luchini, Manuel Blanc and Sandrine Kiberlain. The film is based on the life of the French playwright, financier and spy Pierre Beaumarchais, depicting his activities during the American War of Independence and his authorship of the Figaro trilogy of plays. It was adapted from a play by Sacha Guitry.

The Hôtel de Besenval, a historic hôtel particulier in Paris that has housed the Embassy of the Swiss Confederation and the residence of the Swiss ambassador to France since 1938, served as a filming location.

== Cast ==
- Fabrice Luchini – Pierre Beaumarchais, clockmaker, adventurer, arms dealer, libertine, playwright
- Sandrine Kiberlain – Marie-Thérèse Willermaulaz, Beaumarchais's partner and muse
- Manuel Blanc – Paul-Philippe Gudin de La Brenellerie, Beaumarchais's admirer, colleague and biographer
- Michel Aumont – Louis Auguste Le Tonnelier de Breteuil
- Jean-François Balmer – Antoine de Sartine, lieutenant general of the police then Navy minister, friend of Beaumarchais
- Jean-Claude Brialy – Abbot
- Patrick Bouchitey – Monsieur Lejay, a publisher and bookseller
- Evelyne Bouix – Élisabeth Vigée Le Brun, painter, friend to the Queen who represents her at the reading committee
- Isabelle Carré – Rosine
- José Garcia – Figaro
- Alain Chabat – the courtier at Versailles
- Pierre Gérard – Comte de Provence
- Judith Godrèche – Marie Antoinette
- Murray Head – William, Lord Rochford, Beaumarchais' English friend
- Axelle Laffont – Mariette Lejay, the publisher and bookseller's wife
- Martin Lamotte – Comte de la Blache
- Guy Marchand – Court Member
- François Morel – Peasant in Court
- Claire Nebout – Chevalier d'Eon
- Michel Piccoli – Prince de Conti, a nobleman who becomes friends with Beaumarchais
- Michel Serrault – Louis XV
- Florence Thomassin – Marion Ménard, a theater actress, one of Beaumarchais's mistresses
- Jacques Weber – Duc de Chaulnes, enemy then friend of Beaumarchais
- Jean Yanne – Louis Goëzman, the prosecutor during Beaumarchais's trial
- Dominique Besnehard – Louis XVI
- André Oumansky – The president of the court
- Maka Kotto – Cézaire, Beaumarchais's black servant
- Jeff Nuttall – Benjamin Franklin, ambassador of the United States
- Jay Benedict – The man in grey
- Dominic Gould – Arthur Lee, an American patriot
- Niels Dubost – Count Almaviva
- Marc Dudicourt – Bartholo
- Bruno Lochet – The French jailer
- Cecile Van Den Abeele : Suzanne
- Étienne Draber : Brid'oison
- David Gabison : Doublemain
- Marie Delerm : Marceline
- Séverine Ferrer : Lison-Cherubin
- Patrice Laffont : the customs Officer
- Jean-Marie Besset : Desfontaines, an author, member of the reading committee
- Pascal Thomas : the theater critic
- Sandrine Le Berre : Conti's young daughter
- Roland Blanche : Charles Théveneau de Morande, a pamphleteer (uncredited)
- Roger Brierley : the printer

== See also ==
- List of films about the American Revolution
