= Manuel Blanc =

French actor (born 1968)

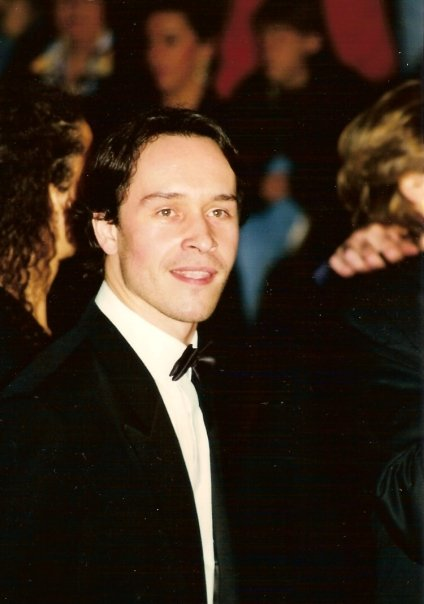
Manuel Blanc at the 1996 Cannes Film Festival

Manuel Blanc (born 12 June 1968) is a French television and film actor.

== Partial filmography ==
- 1991: I Don't Kiss – Pierre Lacaze
- 1993: A Crime – Frédéric Chapelin-Tourvel
- 1994: Des feux mal éteints – Jérôme
- 1994: Lou n'a pas dit non – Pierre
- 1995: Le roi de Paris – Paul Derval
- 1995: La Rivière Espérance (TV Mini-Series) – Benjamin Donadieu
- 1996: Beaumarchais – Gudin
- 1999: 1999 Madeleine – Gabriel
- 2000: Drug Scenes (TV Series) – Renaud
- 2000: Exit – Junk
- 2002: Vivante – Paul
- 2002: Two – Man with the flower / Russian officer / Henri L. / French officer / Man on the beach
- 2002: Mes parents – Le journaliste
- 2003: Je t'aime, je t'adore – Laurent
- 2005: Avant qu'il ne soit trop tard – Doug
- 2005: Telma demain – The teacher
- 2006: Exes – Homme de l'impasse 1
- 2010: Blind Test – Bertrand
- 2013: Holy Thursday (Short, by Antony Hickling) – Dieu
- 2013: Little Gay Boy, chrisT is Dead (by Antony Hickling and Amaury Grisel) – Dieu
- 2013: Little Gay Boy (A Triptych by Antony Hickling) – Dieu
- 2014: One Deep Breath (by Antony Hickling and André Schneider) – Maël
- 2016: Where Horses Go To Die – Manuela / Marco
- 2017: Capitaine Marleau (by Josée Dayan) – Alain Peras
- 2019: Persona non grata – Chargé d'affaires
- 2021 : Down in Paris by Antony Hickling
