= Down in Paris =

2021 French LGBTQ+ film by Antony Hickling

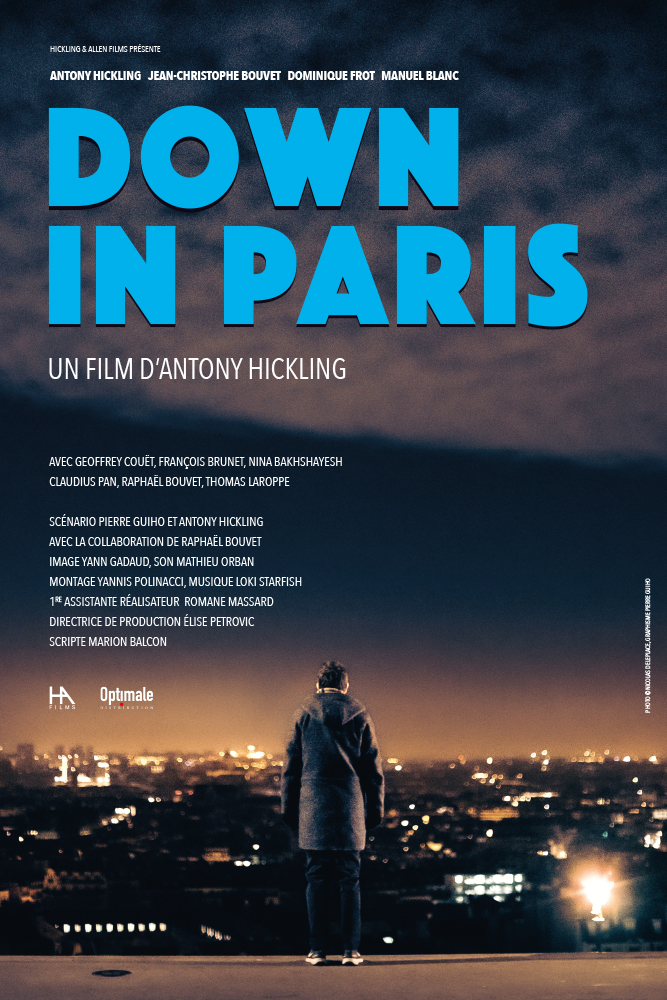
- Poster
- Directed by: Antony Hickling
- Written by: Antony Hickling, Pierre Guiho, Raphaël Bouvet
- Produced by: Antony Hickling
- Starring: Antony Hickling, Dominique Frot, Jean-Christophe Bouvet, Manuel Blanc
- Cinematography: Yann Gadaud
- Edited by: Yannis Polinacci
- Music by: Loki Starfish
- Production companies: H&A Films
- Distributed by: H&A Films, TLA Releasing, Optimale France
- Release date: 2021
- Running time: 102 minutes
- Country: France
- Languages: French, English

Down in Paris is a 2021 French film directed by Antony Hickling. It was first screened at Reeling: The Chicago LGBTQ+ International Film Festival and Out on Film Atlanta's LGBTQ Film Festival, United States.

== Plot ==
The film revolves around a middle aged film director in the middle of a personal crisis. He heads into the Parisian night looking for answers.

== Cast ==
- Antony Hickling: Richard Barlow
- Dominique Frot: Samantha
- Jean-Christophe Bouvet: Robert
- Manuel Blanc: Mathias
- Thomas Laroppe: Tom
- Claudius Pan: Damien
- Nina Bakhshayesh: Elizabeth
- Raphaël Bouvet: Frédéric
- Mike Fédée: Claude
- Emmanuel Barrouyer: Paul
- Geoffrey Couët: Simon

== Awards ==
- Down in Paris wins: Best Director, Queer international Film Festival, Playa del Carmen, Mexico, Nov 2022
- Down in Paris wins: Best Director for a Feature Film (International), Yellowstone International Film Festival, New Delhi, India, October 2022
- Down In Paris wins Best Narrative Feature for the 39th Reeling: The Chicago LGBTQ+ International Film Festival OCT 2021
- Antony Hickling for Down In Paris wins The Kim Renders Memorial Award for Outstanding Performance Reelout Queer Film Festival, Canada, Feb 2022
- Down In Paris obtained the Arthouse Recommendation from the French Association of Arthouse Cinemas on Feb 24, 2022.
