= 1978 Cannes Film Festival =

- Official poster of the 31st Cannes Film Festival, an original illustration Belgian artist Jean-Michel Folon.
- Opening film: A Hunting Accident
- Closing film: Fedora
- Location: Cannes, France
- Founded: 1946
- Awards: Palme d'Or: The Tree of Wooden Clogs
- No. of films: 23 (In Competition)
- Festival date: 16 May 1978 – 30 May 1978
- Website: festival-cannes.com/en

Cannes Film Festival
- 1979 1977

The 31st Cannes Film Festival took place from 16 to 30 May 1978. American filmmaker Alan J. Pakula served as jury president for the main competition.

Italian filmmaker Ermanno Olmi won the Palme d'Or, the festival's top prize, for the drama film The Tree of Wooden Clogs.

This festival saw the introduction of a new section, the Un Certain Regard, initially as a non-competitive programme which replaced the Les Yeux Fertiles (1975-1977), L'Air du temps and Le Passé composé sections.

The festival opened with A Hunting Accident by Emil Loteanu, and closed with Fedora by Billy Wilder.

== Juries ==
=== Main Competition ===
- Alan J. Pakula, American filmmaker - Jury President
- Franco Brusati, Italian filmmaker
- François Chalais, French reporter, journalist, writer and film historian
- Michel Ciment, French film critic
- Claude Goretta, Swiss filmmaker
- Andrei Konchalovsky, Soviet filmmaker
- Harry Saltzman, Canadian producer
- Liv Ullmann, Norwegian actress
- Georges Wakhévitch, French art director

== Official selection ==
=== In Competition ===
The following feature films competed for the Palme d'Or:

English title	Original title	Director(s)	Production country
Blindfolded Eyes	Los ojos vendados	Carlos Saura	Spain
Bravo maestro		Rajko Grlić	Yugoslavia
Bye Bye Monkey	Ciao maschio	Marco Ferreri	Italy, France
The Chant of Jimmie Blacksmith		Fred Schepisi	Australia
Coming Home		Hal Ashby	United States
Despair		Rainer Werner Fassbinder	West Germany
A Dream of Passion	Κραυγή Γυναικών	Jules Dassin	Greece, Switzerland
Ecce bombo		Nanni Moretti	Italy
Empire of Passion	愛の亡霊	Nagisa Ōshima	France, Japan
A Hunting Accident (opening film)	Мой ласковый и нежный зверь	Emil Loteanu	Soviet Union
The Left-Handed Woman	Die linkshändige Frau	Peter Handke	West Germany
Midnight Express		Alan Parker	United Kingdom, United States
Molière		Ariane Mnouchkine	France
Pretty Baby		Louis Malle	United States
The Recourse to the Method	El recurso del método	Miguel Littin	Mexico, Cuba
The Remains from the Shipwreck	Los restos del naufragio	Ricardo Franco	Spain
The Shout		Jerzy Skolimowski	United Kingdom
Spiral	Spirala	Krzysztof Zanussi	Poland
The Tree of Wooden Clogs	L'albero degli zoccoli	Ermanno Olmi	Italy
An Unmarried Woman		Paul Mazursky	United States
A Very Moral Night	Egy erkölcsös éjszaka	Károly Makk	Hungary
Violette Nozière		Claude Chabrol	France, Canada
Who'll Stop the Rain		Karel Reisz	United States

=== Un Certain Regard ===
The following films were selected for the Un Certain Regard section:

English title	Original title	Director(s)	Production country
Alyam, alyam	آليام آليام	Ahmed El Maanouni	Morocco
Balcony in the Forest	Un balcon en forêt	Michel Mitrani	France
Dossier 51	Le dossier 51	Michel Deville	France
Colonel Delmiro Gouveia	Coronel Delmiro Gouveia	Geraldo Sarno	Brazil
Grand Hôtel des Palmes		Memè Perlini	Italy
Hitler: A Film from Germany	Hitler, ein Film aus Deutschland	Hans-Jürgen Syberberg	West Germany, France, United Kingdom
Koko: A Talking Gorilla	Koko, le gorille qui parle	Barbet Schroeder	France
Man of Marble	Człowiek z marmuru	Andrzej Wajda	Poland
Nahapet	Նահապետ	Henrik Malyan	Soviet Union
The New Klan: Heritage of Hate		Leslie Shatz and Eleanor Bingham	United States
Ocaña, an Intermittent Portrait	Ocaña, retrato intermitente	Ventura Pons	Spain
People Not as Bad as They Seem	Aika hyvä ihmiseksi	Rauni Mollberg	Finland
Die Rückkehr des alten Herrn		Vojtěch Jasný	Austria

=== Out of Competition ===
The following films were selected to be screened out of competition:

English title	Original title	Director(s)	Production country
Fedora (closing film)		Billy Wilder	West Germany, France
The Last Waltz		Martin Scorsese	United States

=== Short Films Competition ===
The following short films competed for the Short Film Palme d'Or:

- Christmas Morning by Tiernan MacBride
- A Doonesbury Special by John Hubley
- Letter to a Friend by Sonia Hofmann
- Maladie by Paul Vecchiali
- Oh My Darling by Børge Ring
- The Oriental Nightfish by Ian Emes
- Le Serpentine d'oro by Anna Maria Tatò
- La Traversée de l'Atlantique à la rame by Jean-François Laguionie
- Uj lakok by Liviusz Gyulai

== Parallel sections ==
=== International Critics' Week ===
The following feature films were screened for the 17th International Critics' Week (17e Semaine de la Critique):

- Alambrista! by Robert Young (United States)
- A Breach in the Wall (Une Brèche dans le mur) by Jillali Ferhati (Morocco)
- Fragrance of Wild Flowers (Miris poljskog cveca) by Srđan Karanović (Yugoslavia)
- Jubilee by Derek Jarman (United Kingdom)
- One and One (En och en) by Erland Josephson, Sven Nykvist & Ingrid Thulin (Sweden)
- Roberte by Robert Zucca (France)
- This Is the Night (Per questa notte) by Carlo di Carlo (Italy)
- The Woman Across the Way (Die Frau gegenüber) by Hans Noever (West Germany)

=== Directors' Fortnight ===
The following films were screened for the 1978 Directors' Fortnight (Quinzaine des Réalizateurs):

- Alicia en la España de las maravillas by Jordi Feliu
- Bilbao by Bigas Luna
- Fine Manners (Les belles manières) by Jean-Claude Guiguet
- Gamín by Ciro Duran
- The Getting of Wisdom by Bruce Beresford
- Girlfriends by Claudia Weill
- The Main Actor by Reinhard Hauff
- Los Hijos de Fierro by Fernando Solanas
- The Holy Alliance (A Santa Aliança) by Eduardo Geada
- Insiang by Lino Brocka
- The Mafu Cage by Karen Arthur
- Mother and Daughter (Maternale) by Giovanna Gagliardo
- Oka Oori Katha by Mrinal Sen
- One and One (En och en) by Erland Josephson, Sven Nykvist, Ingrid Thulin
- The Reign of Naples (El regno di Napoli) by Werner Schroeter
- Renaldo and Clara by Bob Dylan
- Rocking Horse (Susetz) by Yaky Yosha
- The Scenic Route by Mark Rappaport
- A Summer Rain (Chuvas de Verão) by Carlos Diegues
- I Vecchi e I Giovani by Marco Leto
- Zoo Zéro by Alain Fleischer

== Official Awards ==
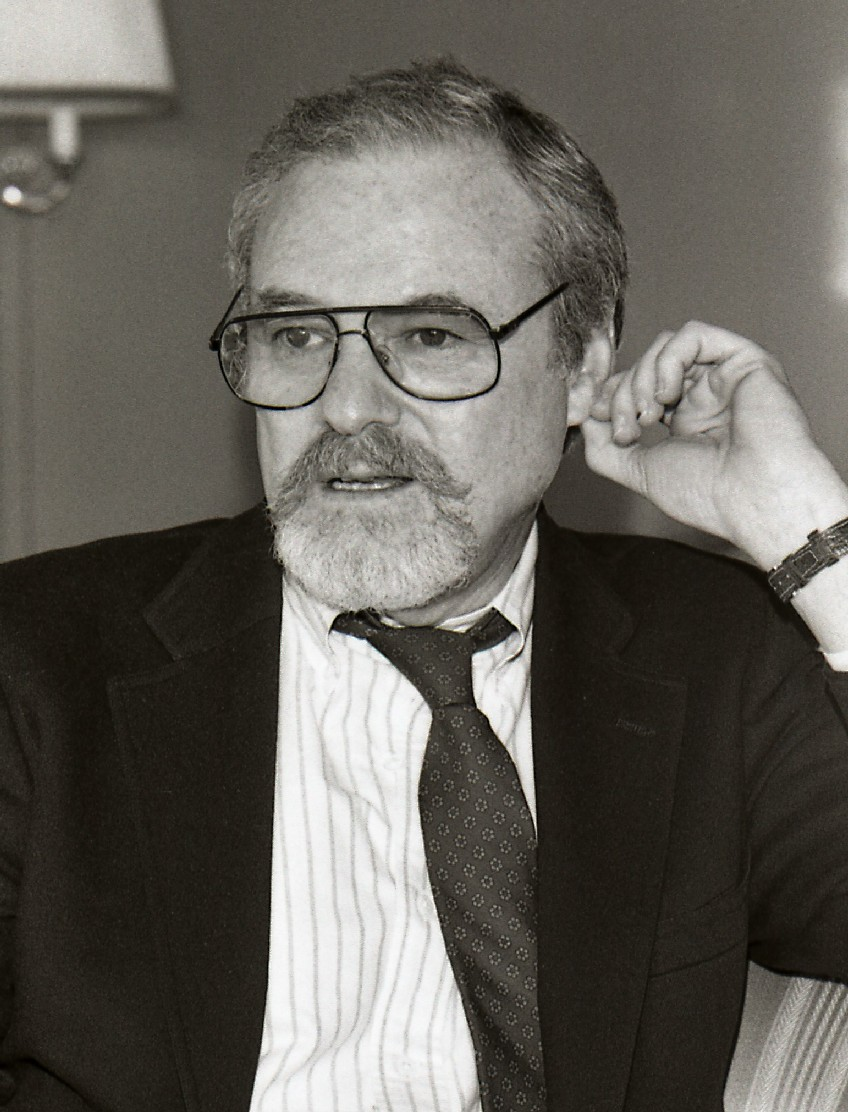
Alan J. Pakula, Jury President

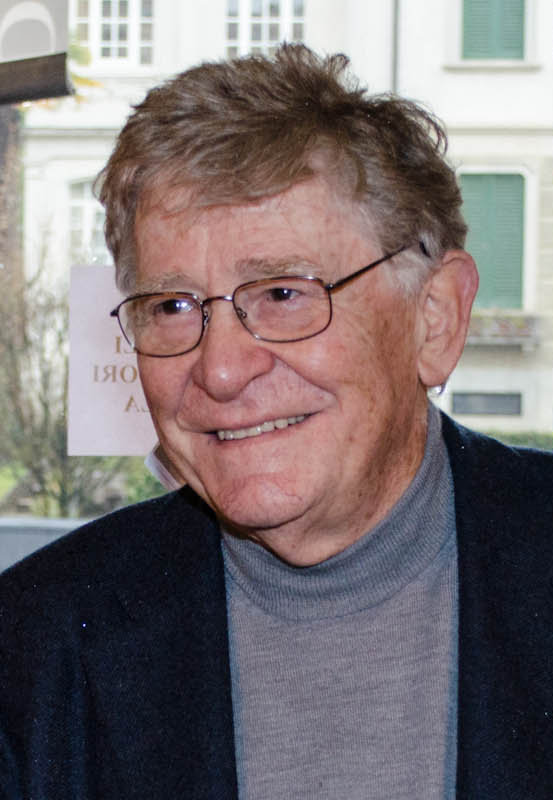
Ermanno Olmi, Palme d'Or winner

=== In Competition ===
The following films and people received the 1978 Official selection awards:

- Palme d'Or: The Tree of Wooden Clogs by Ermanno Olmi
- Grand Prix:
  - Bye Bye Monkey by Marco Ferreri
  - The Shout by Jerzy Skolimowski
- Best Director: Nagisa Ōshima for Empire of Passion
- Best Actress:
  - Jill Clayburgh for An Unmarried Woman
  - Isabelle Huppert for Violette Nozière
- Best Actor: Jon Voight for Coming Home

=== Caméra d'Or ===
- Alambrista! by Robert M. Young

=== Short Film Palme d'Or ===
- Rowing Across the Atlantic by Jean-François Laguionie
- Jury Prize:
  - A Doonesbury Special by John Hubley, Faith Hubley and Garry Trudeau
  - Oh My Darling by Børge Ring

== Independent awards ==
=== FIPRESCI Prize ===
- Man of Marble by Andrzej Wajda (Un Certain Regard - Unanimously)
- Fragrance of Wild Flowers by Srdjan Karanovic (International Critics' Week)

=== Commission Supérieure Technique ===
- Technical Grand Prize: Pretty Baby by Louis Malle

=== Prize of the Ecumenical Jury ===
- The Tree of Wooden Clogs by Ermanno Olmi

== Cultural references ==
Michael Ritchie's 1979 film An Almost Perfect Affair, a romantic comedy starring Keith Carradine and Monica Vitti, features several scenes shot on location in Cannes while the 1978 Festival was taking place. A number of prominent actors, directors and journalists who attended that year made cameo appearances in the film, including Rona Barrett, Farrah Fawcett, Brooke Shields, George Peppard, Paul Mazursky, Sergio Leone, Marco Ferreri, Rex Reed and Edy Williams.

== Media ==
- INA: Opening of the 1978 Festival (commentary in French)
- INA: Chronicle of the 1978 Cannes Festival (commentary in French)
