= Louise by the Shore =

- Directed by: Jean-François Laguionie
- Written by: Jean-François Laguionie
- Produced by: Jean-Pierre Lemouland; Galilé Marion-Gauvin
- Starring: Dominique Frot
- Edited by: Kara Blake
- Music by: Pierre Kellner; Pascal Le Pennec
- Production companies: JPL Films; Unité centrale Tchack; Arte France Cinéma
- Release dates: 15 June 2016 (Annecy); 23 November 2016
- Running time: 75 minutes
- Countries: France; Canada
- Language: French

Louise by the Shore (French: Louise en hiver; transl. Louise in winter) is a 2016 animated drama film directed by Jean-François Laguionie and starring Dominique Frot. It follows an elderly woman who spends the winter in an empty French seaside town, with only her memories and imagination for company.

== Cast ==
- Diane Dassigny as young Louise
- Dominique Frot as old Louise
- Antony Hickling as Tom, the parachutist
- Jean-François Laguionie as Pépère

== Release ==
The film premiered on 15 June 2016 in competition at the Annecy International Animated Film Festival. It was released in France on 23 November 2016.

== Reception ==
Jordan Mintzer of The Hollywood Reporter wrote: "Directed with hand-drawn affection by Jean-Francois Laguionie, whose critically praised The Painting was released in 2013, this slow-burn short feature is not exactly easy fodder for cartoon lovers, but could please viewers who want more out of an animation film than just action-packed gags." Mintzer compared the film to The Red Turtle, "another unique 2D tale of Crusoe-esque abandon that was also made by a veteran filmmaker", but wrote that Louise by the Shore differs with its "more dark and probing character study". Screen Daily's Wendy Ide wrote: "The relationship between Louise (Dominique Frot) and the dog Pepper (voiced by Laguionie) is reminiscent of that between the old man and his dog in Paul and Sandra Fierlinger's My Dog Tulip, and this charming film should resonate with a similar audience."
