= Frig =

Frig may refer to:

- Frig (Anglo-Saxon goddess), a love goddess in Anglo-Saxon paganism
- Frig (interjection), an English word
- Frig (film), a French film
- Len Frig (born 1950), a Canadian ice hockey defenceman

== See also ==
- Frigg (disambiguation)
