= Yasmine Belmadi =

French actor

- Born: 26 January 1976; Aubervilliers, France
- Died: 18 July 2009 (aged 33); Paris, France
- Occupation: Actor
- Years active: 1997–2009

Yasmine Belmadi (26 January 1976 – 18 July 2009) was a French actor of Algerian parents. He appeared in 13 films, and had completed his final role, in a television production, the day before his death.

== Biography ==
Belmadi grew up in the northern Paris suburb of Aubervilliers. His first screen appearance was in 1997, when he played a young gay beur in the short film Les Corps ouverts, directed by Sébastien Lifshitz. The film was a critical success, winning two awards (the Prix Kodak and the Prix Jean Vigo) in the category of short film in 1998. Other notable films in which Belmadi appeared include Les Amants criminels, Wild Side, Beur blanc rouge and Grande École.

Belmadi played a lead rôle in the 2009 film Adieu Gary, directed by Nassim Amaouche, which won the Critics' Week Grand Prix at the 2009 Cannes Film Festival. Adieu Gary went on general release in France on 22 July 2009, four days after Belmadi's death. Belmadi's last rôle was in Pigalle, a production for French television channel Canal+, which he completed on 17 July 2009.

== Death ==
On 18 July 2009, at 6 a.m., the scooter which Belmadi was riding collided with a lamp post at the intersection of the Pont de Sully and the Boulevard Henri IV in Paris. He was taken to the Pitié-Salpêtrière Hospital, where he died from his injuries, aged 33.

== Filmography ==
- 1997: Les Corps ouverts - dir. Sébastien Lifshitz
- 1998: Les Terres froides - dir. Sébastien Lifshitz (TV film)
- 1999: Les Amants criminels - dir. François Ozon
- 2000: Un dérangement considérable - dir. Bernard Stora
- 2000: Les Gens en maillot de bain ne sont pas (forcément) superficiels - dir. Éric Assous
- 2003: Filles uniques - dir. Pierre Jolivet
- 2003: Qui a tué Bambi? - dir. Gilles Marchand
- 2004: Wild Side - dir. Sébastien Lifshitz
- 2004: Beur blanc rouge - dir. Mahmoud Zemmouri
- 2004: Grande École - dir. Robert Salis
- 2005: Au petit matin - dir. Xavier Gens
- 2008: Coupable - dir. Laetitia Masson
- 2009: Adieu Gary - dir. Nassim Amaouche
- 2009: Pigalle - dir. Hervé Hadmar (TV film)
