= One Deep Breath (film) =

- Directed by: Antony Hickling
- Written by: Antony Hickling; André Schneider
- Produced by: Antony Hickling
- Starring: Manuel Blanc; Thomas Laroppe; Stéphanie Michelini; André Schneider
- Cinematography: Tom Chabbat
- Edited by: Victor Toussaint
- Music by: Julien Mélique
- Production companies: H&A films; Vivàsvan Pictures
- Distributed by: Optimale France; Open-Reel Pictures (Italy)
- Release date: 2014
- Running time: 56 minutes
- Country: France
- Languages: French; English; German

One Deep Breath is a French experimental film directed by Antony Hickling in 2014.

== Plot ==
The film follows Maël (Manuel Blanc), traumatized by the suicide of his lover.

== Cast ==
- Manuel Blanc: Maël
- Thomas Laroppe: Adam
- Stéphanie Michelini: Patricia Kerouac
- André Schneider: Adrien
- Biño Sauitzvy: Death
- Magali Gaudou: Life

== Awards ==
- One Deep Breath – Best experimental feature at Zinegoak film festival in Bilbao, Spain, 2015
