= Two (2002 film) =

2002 French experimental surrealist arthouse psychological drama film

- Directed by: Werner Schroeter
- Written by: Werner Schroeter; Cédric Anger
- Produced by: Paulo Branco
- Starring: Isabelle Huppert
- Cinematography: Elfi Mikesch
- Edited by: Juliane Lorenz
- Release date: 13 November 2002
- Running time: 121 minutes
- Country: France
- Language: French
- Budget: $3.1 million
- Box office: $110,000

Two (French: Deux) is a 2002 French surrealist experimental arthouse psychological drama film directed by Werner Schroeter and starring Isabelle Huppert.

== Cast ==
- Isabelle Huppert - Magdalena / Maria
- Bulle Ogier - Anna, the mother
- Manuel Blanc - Man with the flower / Russian officer / Henri L. / French officer / Man on the beach
- Arielle Dombasle - Professor Barbez
- Annika Kuhl - Erika, the mistress
- Robinson Stévenin - Young man on the bike
- Philippe Reuter - Hans
- Pascal Bongard - Alfred
- Jean-François Stévenin - Man in the car
- Dominique Frot - The adoptive mother
- Rita Loureiro - Julia / Young girl in Paris
- Philippe Carta - Taxi driver / sailor
- Tim Fischer - Josephine Baker
- Rogério Samora - Sintra castle keeper
- Zazie De Paris - Zazie
- Hovnatan Avédikian - Jesus
- Elisabeth Cooper - Elisabeth
- Alexia Voulgaridou - Singer
- Delphine Marque - Claudia
