= Wild Side (2004 film) =

- Theatrical poster
- Directed by: Sébastien Lifshitz
- Written by: Stéphane Bouquet; Sébastien Lifshitz
- Produced by: Gilles Sandoz
- Starring: Stéphanie Michelini; Yasmine Belmadi; Edouard Nikitine
- Cinematography: Agnès Godard
- Edited by: Stéphanie Mahet
- Music by: Jocelyn Pook
- Distributed by: Ad Vitam Distribution (France); Peccadillo Pictures Ltd. (UK)
- Release dates: 8 February 2004 (Berlin); 14 April 2004 (France); 25 September 2004 (Belgium); 15 April 2005 (UK)
- Running time: 93 minutes
- Countries: Belgium; France; United Kingdom
- Languages: English; Russian; French
- Box office: $15,355 (US sub-total)

Wild Side is a 2004 drama film directed by Sébastien Lifshitz and starring Stéphanie Michelini, Yasmine Belmadi, and Edouard Nikitine. It premiered at the 2004 Berlin International Film Festival.

== Plot ==
Stéphanie, a transgender sex worker (Stéphanie Michelini) travels from Paris to a small town to care for her sick mother. She is joined by her two flatmates, an Algerian hustler, Jamal and a Russian soldier on AWOL, Mikhail. Both men fall in love with Stéphanie and she decides to have a relationship with them both.

== Cast ==
- Stéphanie Michelini as Stéphanie
- Yasmine Belmadi as Djamel
- Edouard Nikitine as Mikhail
- Josiane Stoléru as the mother
- Aurélie Guichard
- Anohni as the singer
- Liliane Nataf
- Christophe Sermet as Nicolas

== Awards ==
In 2004 Wild Side won two awards, including the Teddy Award, at the Berlin Film Festival, the Special Jury Award at the Gijón International Film Festival, the Grand Jury Award at L.A. Outfest and the New Director's Showcase Award at the Seattle International Film Festival.

Michelini won the Prix Michel-Simon for Best Actress for her role.

== Reception ==
Wild Side has received positive reviews from critics. On Rotten Tomatoes the film has an approval rating of 63% based on reviews from 16 critics.

Russell Edwards of Variety stated, "A morbid and self-important homosexual Jules & Jim for the new millennium", "intention to shock is unmistakable" and "narrative-time shuffles only disrupt the flow". V.A. Musetto of the New York Post on 10 June 2005, noted "Viewers are either going to walk out after 10 minutes or, like this tolerant critic, get caught up in the sordid lives of the three misfits and stick around for the ambiguous ending". Chris reviewing for eyeforfilm.co.uk on 7 April 2008 noted it is "beautifully photographed" and has "typically unpretentious French acting". Timeout states the film follows a "non-linear tapestry" and it is "a meditative tone-poem on society’s marginals".

Todd W. Reeser wrote in Studies in French Cinema in 2007 about the film's complex narrative.
