= The Painting (2011 film) =

2011 film

- Film poster
- Le Tableau
- Directed by: Jean-François Laguionie
- Written by: Jean-François Laguionie; Anik Leray
- Produced by: Armelle Glorennec; Eric Jacquot
- Starring: Jessica Monceau; Adrien Larmande
- Edited by: Emmanuel de Miranda
- Music by: Pascal Le Pennec
- Production companies: Blue Spirit; Be-Films
- Distributed by: Gebeka Films
- Release date: 23 November 2011
- Running time: 76 minutes
- Countries: France; Belgium
- Language: French
- Budget: €4 million

The Painting (French: Le Tableau) is a 2011 French animated film directed by Jean-François Laguionie.

== Plot ==
For mysterious reasons, a painter has left a work incomplete, causing conflict between the Toupins (Allduns), who are entirely painted, the Pafinis (Halfies), who lack a few colors and the Reufs (Sketchies), who are only sketches. Toupins occupy the chateau, Pafinis are out in the gardens and Reufs are treated as outcasts and hunted by the Toupins. Three friends, one of each class, embark on a quest to find the artist so that he can finish the piece and hopefully unite the people.

== Cast ==
Character	Original Actor	Dub Actor
Lola	Jessica Monceau	Kamali Minter
Ramo	Adrien Larmande	Michael Sinterniklaas
Claire	Chloé Berthier	Eden Riegel
The Great Chandelier		Marc Thompson
Quill	Thierry Jahn	Wayne Grayson
Gum	Julien Bouanich	Colin DePaula
Magenta	Thomas Sagols	Spike Spencer
Gray Morgen		Christopher Kromer
Florence		Mary Elizabeth McGlynn
Self-Portrait	Jean-François Laguionie	Steve Blum
Harlequin		Colleen O'Shaughnessey
The Painter	Jean Barney	JB Blanc
Silhouette	Jérémy Prévost	Sam Riegel
Pierrot		Dave B. Mitchell
Grim Reaper		Dave B. Mitchell

== Production ==
The film was coproduced by France's Blue Spirit and Belgium's Be-Films. It took two years to finance and had a budget of four million euro. Jean-François Laguionie designed every character himself. The designs include homages to painters such as Marc Chagall, Amedeo Modigliani, Pablo Picasso and Henri Matisse. Preproduction took 15 months and production took one year. The film was animated in digital 3D.

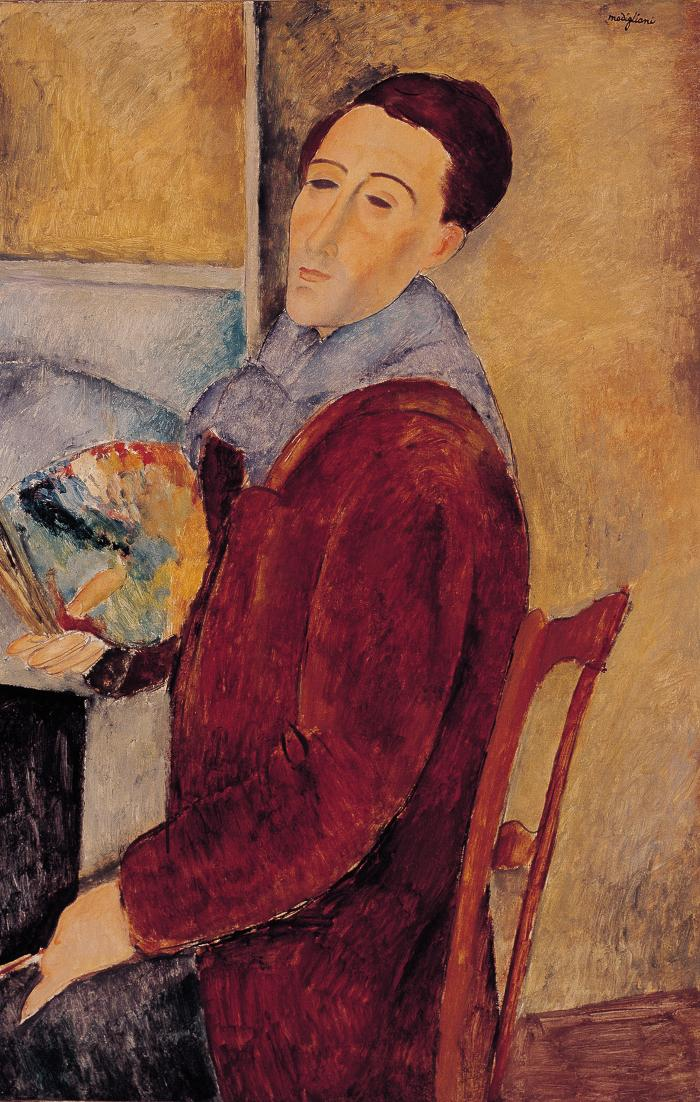
One of the pictorial inspirations for The Painting: Amedeo Modigliani (here Self-Portrait, 1919).

The Painting is the fourth feature-length animated film by Jean-François Laguionie after Gwen and the Book of Sand, The Castle of the Monkeys, and The Island of Black Mór. The creation of The Painting takes five years.

=== Original Idea and Script ===
The script of the film is written by Anik Le Ray, who had previously worked with Laguionie on The Island of Black Mór; she writes the script for The Painting while Laguionie is finishing The Island. Anik Le Ray's initial idea is to conceive a story on the theme of creation. She begins by imagining a story between a painter and his model. However, this initial idea seems insufficient for a film likely to interest children. She adds another idea: that of an unfinished painting whose characters would remain at different degrees of completion. She then conceives a hierarchical society living in an unfinished painting; she relies on the fictional biography of the Painter to give coherence to the different paintings where the characters travel, several corresponding to a "Venetian" period of the Painter, or referring to his romantic or family life.

=== Graphics ===
Le Ray had no fixed idea about the painter's style while writing the script; the visual universe of the film is clarified later when Laguionie develops it in collaboration with the film's production designer, Jean Palenstijn. Laguionie first invents a historical context for the character of the Painter, situating his career in the 1920s-1930s, and determining his pictorial influences: he draws inspiration from Chagall, Matisse, Derain, Bonnard, as well as Picasso and Modigliani, whose earlier canvases of the Painter, seen in his studio, are imitations. The choice of this period is explained by the movie's need to draw on figurative painting before the emergence of abstract painting. The references to real painters are not explicit, as Laguionie did not want to make an educational film.

The worlds of the various paintings have been designed to not reference too precisely a given historical period: in the initial painting, the costumes of the Toupins mix elements from different centuries, as do the uniforms of the soldiers in the painting about war. The appearance of the Reufs and the Pafinis from the initial painting is directly inspired by the technique of canvas painting: it imitates the grey and ochre tones of the gesso layer applied to the canvas before painting, as well as the sketches from the sketches, which are not easy to model in computer-generated images.

Jean-François Laguionie dedicates two years to the creation of the characters and then the animatic, a drawn model of the film. He creates not so much a storyboard (he does not draw the plans in boxes), but a succession of more than 2000 drawings, one for each shot, which he draws in a notebook, films, and then edits together using software, before adjusting the duration of each shot and making a provisional recording of the dialogues, himself or with friends. The model serves as a basis for work with the film's producer. The production experiences several interruptions due to the time needed to gather the film's financing.

=== Animation ===
The animation of the film is produced in France and Belgium, by the French studio Blue Spirit and the Belgian studio BE Films. While the backgrounds of the paintings are two-dimensional, the characters from the painting are modeled in computer graphics but with a rendering that mimics a two-dimensional painting. The integration of the characters into the backgrounds requires special care, so that each image appears to be designed by a painter in two dimensions: thus, perspective is minimized for all scenes taking place within the paintings. In contrast, the painter's studio, also modeled in computer graphics, is represented in a very realistic style, but still tends toward theatrical decor and seeks to establish an atmosphere of mystery. The sequences where the characters of the paintings move in the studio allow more freedom in terms of animation. The film uses many computer tools, but the computer animation is designed to reproduce the effect of the brush and the movement characteristic of traditional 2D animation.

=== Casting ===
In agreement with the producer, Laguionie chooses young actors from the conservatory to perform the voices of the characters, in order to avoid overly familiar voices.

== Critical reception ==
The Painting premiered in France in Paris at the children's film festival Mon premier festival on 1 November 2011. It was then released in theaters on 23 November. The Painting received very favorable reviews from critics. As of early December 2011, the site AlloCiné gives the film an average score of 4.1 out of 5 based on fourteen reviews published in the press; among these reviews, four give it the highest rating, seven a score of 4 out of 5, and three a score of 3 out of 5.

Among the best critiques, that of François-Guillaume Lorrain in Le Point considers the film to be the masterpiece of Jean-François Laguionie; he mentions ''one of the most inventive and poetic scripts that French cinema has offered us this year'' showing ''a quest for self, an ode to justice, a reflection also on creation'', and judges the settings as ''breathtakingly beautiful''. Christophe Carrière, in L'Express, sees the film as ''a marvel''. He considers the film visually stunning and sees in its animation style ''handcrafted artistry worthy of Paul Grimault, whose influence he also recognizes in the social scope of the script.'' Philippe Jambet, in the cinema magazine Première, particularly appreciates the social and political significance of the script, which he finds sensitive also in the artistic approach of the director, and ''invites the youth to think beyond mere representation''.

In Le Figaroscope, Emmanuèle Frois gives the film a score of 3 out of 4 and judges that ''with its different degrees of reading, its multiple references to Matisse, Derain, Bonnard... This animation wonder speaks to both children and parents''. The critique from Ouest-France also gives the film a score of 3 out of 4, and, sensitive to the ''singularity'' of Laguionie's universe, praises the originality of the script and its social reflection, the pictorial references in the universe, and ''an aesthetic approach that knows how to draw from the universal heritage to establish a world that belongs only to its creator''. In Les Inrockuptibles, Vincent Ostria assesses that ''this ''Painting'' that speaks of drawing and painting is undoubtedly the most ambitious and poetic work of the animated filmmaker Jean-François Laguionie''.

For Thierry Méranger, in Cahiers du cinéma, the film "offers the luxury of a nicely political fable that tackles a hierarchical society beset by totalitarianism where a self-sufficient aristocracy – the Toupins – set fire to the huts of refugees".

In the newspaper Le Monde, Thomas Sotinel signs a mixed review: he appreciates the ''constant graphic invention'', but criticizes the script (which he considers ''both sophisticated and naive'') for its digressions, which he feels lose sight of the initial idea during part of the film. He estimates that ''the spectacle of these animated images according to laws that are not those of the third dimension market is so refreshing, so satisfying, that one will forgive ''The Painting'' for being an imperfect film''.

== Box Office ==
Upon its theatrical release on 23 November, The Painting is screened in 100 copies. In its second week, it gathers 28,188 spectators and totals 49,540 admissions after two weeks. In its third week, the film gathers 45,133 admissions and totals 140,961.

== Release ==
The film was released in France by Gebeka Films on 23 November 2011. It competed at the 2012 Annecy International Animated Film Festival. Distribution rights for the United States have been acquired by GKIDS.

== Reception ==
=== Accolades ===
- In June 2013, the film was given the award for Best Feature Film at the 8th Festival of European Animated Feature Films and TV Specials.
