= Monique Mélinand =

French actress (1916–2012)

- Born: 9 March 1916; Paris, France
- Died: 16 May 2012 (aged 96); Paris, France
- Occupation: Actress
- Years active: 1947-2012 (film)

Monique Mélinand (9 March 1916 – 16 May 2012) was a French film and television actress.

== Selected filmography ==
- Rouletabille joue et gagne (1947)
- Rouletabille contre la dame de pique (1948)
- Between Eleven and Midnight (1949) - Irma
- The Sinners (1949) - Mademoiselle Guérande
- Lady Paname (1950) - Costa - l'accompagnatrice
- Old Boys of Saint-Loup (1950) - Hélène Laclaux
- The Drunkard (1953) - Denise Lamarche
- Blood to the Head (1956) - Marthe Cardinaud
- Women Are Weak (1959) - Mme Fenal, Julien's mother
- Magnificent Sinner (1959) - Tsarina Maria
- Vers l'extase (1960) - Mme Schultz
- The End of Belle (1961) - Mme. Monique Blanchon
- Rencontres (1962) - Inès
- La Bonne Soupe (1964) - La mère de Marie
- Angélique, Marquise des Anges (1964) - La Marquise du Plessis-Bellières (uncredited)
- The Great Spy Chase (1964) - Mme Lagneau (uncredited)
- The Thief of Paris (1967) - Mme de Montareuil
- L'horizon (1967) - La mère
- Delphine (1969) - La mère de Delphine
- The Scarlet Lady (1969) - Medium
- L'Américain (1969)
- Last Known Address (1970) - Mme Loring
- The Lady in the Car with Glasses and a Gun (1970) - Barmaid
- To Die of Love (1971) - Madame Leguen
- Love Me Strangely (1971) - La voisine témoin
- Le cri du cormoran, le soir au-dessus des jonques (1971) - Une passante (uncredited)
- Léa l'hiver (1971) - La mère de Léa
- Les jambes en l'air (1971)
- L'homme au cerveau greffé (1971) - Elisabeth Marcilly
- Hellé (1972)
- A Slightly Pregnant Man (1973) - Mme Solanel
- Creezy (1974) - Simone
- The Mouth Agape (1974) - Monique, la mère
- 7 morts sur ordonnance (1975) - Mrs. Giret
- Les mal partis (1976) - La boulangère
- Body of My Enemy (1976) - Mme Mauve, la mère d'Hélène / Mrs. Mauve
- Solemn Communion (1977) - Julie Ternolain à 45 ans
- The Machine (1977) - Le juge d'instruction
- Va voir maman, papa travaille (1978) - La mère d'Agnès
- Plurielles (1979) - La mère
- An Adventure for Two (1979) - La mère de Françoise
- Eclipse sur un ancien chemin vers Compostelle (1980)
- Cauchemar (1980) - Gelinotte
- They Call It an Accident (1982) - La mère de Gabriel
- On a volé Charlie Spencer! (1986) - La mère de la petite blonde
- Vent de galerne (1989) - Delphine
- Overseas (1990) - Tante Léonie
- Toubab Bi (1991) - Mamie Chapeau
- L'écrivain public (1993) - La dame
- Joan the Maid (1994) - Jeanne de Luxembourg
- Les frères Gravet (1996) - Annie Gravet
- Three Lives and Only One Death (1996) - Madame Vickers
- Transatlantique (1996) - Esther
- Genealogies of a Crime (1997) - Louise
- Time Regained (1999) - La grand-mère de Marcel
- Savage Souls (2001) - Thérèse âgée
- The Giraffe's Neck (2004) - Madeleine
- April in Love (2006) - Soeur Céleste
- Président (2006) - Mère président
- Avanti (2012) - Anita (final film role)

== Bibliography ==
- Capua, Michelangelo. Anatole Litvak: The Life and Films. McFarland, 2015.
