= Once More (1988 film) =

- Directed by: Paul Vecchiali
- Written by: Paul Vecchiali
- Cinematography: Georges Strouvé
- Music by: Roland Vincent
- Release date: 1988
- Country: France
- Language: French

Once More (also known as Encore) is a 1988 French drama film written and directed by Paul Vecchiali.

The film was entered into the main competition at the 45th edition of the Venice Film Festival, where it won the Filmcritica Award and a Special Golden Ciak Award.

== Plot ==
The film follows the life of Louis, who holds a trustworthy but subordinate job in a major company. He lives with his wife Sybèle and their daughter Anne-Marie, with whom he has a special relationship. He starts to grow sick of his seemingly mundane life, however, and starts to look for happiness elsewhere; this is where he starts discovering his attractions to men. He meets Yvan, a mysterious yet fascinating character, though the two do not pursue a sexual relationship. It is through Yvan however that Louis meets Frantz, a gay movie star. Their love only begins to unfurl the horrific events upon his horizon, which will ultimately change their lives forever.

== Cast ==
- Jean-Louis Rolland as Louis
- Florence Giorgetti as Sybèle
- Pascale Rocard as Anne-Marie
- Nicolas Silberg as Yvan
- Patrick Raynal as Frantz
- Séverine Vincent as Immondice
- Albert Dupontel as Alain
- Michel Gautier as Michel
- Dora Doll as The Mother
- Catherine Becker as Cathy
