= Grande École (film) =

2004 film by Robert Salis

- Theatrical release poster
- Directed by: Robert Salis
- Screenplay by: Robert Salis; Jean-Marie Besset
- Based on: The Best of Schools by Jean-Marie Besset
- Produced by: Humbert Balsan
- Starring: Grégori Baquet; Jocelyn Quivrin; Arthur Jugnot; Alice Taglioni; Elodie Navarre; Salim Kechiouche; Éva Darlan; Lakshantha Abenayake; Yasmine Belmadi; Jacques Collard; Jo Prestia
- Cinematography: Emmanuel Soyer
- Edited by: Catherine Schwartz
- Music by: Eric Neveux
- Production companies: Ognon Pictures; France 2 Cinéma; Eden Films
- Distributed by: Pyramide Distribution
- Release dates: 28 January 2004 (IFFR); 4 February 2004 (France)
- Running time: 110 minutes
- Country: France
- Language: French
- Box office: $310,000

Grande École is a 2004 French erotic drama film directed by Robert Salis, based on the stage play The Best of Schools by Jean-Marie Besset. The film is about education, class, race and homosexuality.

It was cited as an early example of casting Arab men as gays compared to heterosexual white men in French films, Salim Kechiouche as 'Mecir'.

== Plot ==
Paul is an upper-class young man who is about to start at a grande école, one of the system of mostly public colleges to which students are admitted based on a highly competitive process and whose graduates often gain prestigious employment. He has chosen to live with two new roommates instead of his girlfriend Agnès.

As a result, with his studies, he has little time to see her. Agnès perceives cracks in their relationship when she suspects Paul's attraction to one of his new roommates, the aristocratic Louis-Arnault. Paul denies any homosexual attraction, but Agnès decides to make a bet with him: whichever of them beds Louis-Arnault first wins. If she does, Paul must stop exploring his sexuality; if he does, she will leave him.

Before the bet plays out, Paul meets Mécir, a young Arab worker, who becomes besotted with him. With Mécir, Paul goes on a journey of discovery that changes many of his ideas about class, cultural differences and sexuality.

== Cast ==
- Grégori Baquet as Paul
- Alice Taglioni as Agnès
- Jocelyn Quivrin as Louis-Arnault
- Élodie Navarre as Emeline
- Arthur Jugnot as Chouquet
- Salim Kechiouche as Mécir
- Éva Darlan as Mrs Chouquet
- Yasmine Belmadi as worker in flashback
- Arnaud Binard as water polo trainer

== Reception ==
The film won the IFFR Audience Award at the International Film Festival Rotterdam.

Grande École has received mixed reviews from critics. On Rotten Tomatoes 3 reviews are listed, 2 positive, 1 negative.

Nick Jones of eyeforfilm.co stated, "rather than focusing on the central, emotional aspect of the story – Paul coming to terms with his sexuality – Salis tries to cover other issues in too much detail" and "you are left feeling short-changed by a script that conveniently ignores certain issues and abandons characters for its own means".

Pierre Murat from telerama.fr said, "Robert Salis films rather well desire, first unconscious and then assumed", but "he films the pleasure less well" and "the actors do not lack courage, especially Jocelyn Quivrin".

Barry Forshaw in 2015 called it "powerful and moving drama" and "an passionate and erotic film".

It is mentioned in Vitamin Q book by Jim Brogan in 2014, "beautiful, naked men, particularly in the showers of a local water polo club".
