= Frigg (disambiguation) =

Frigg is a Germanic goddess.

Frigg may also refer to:

== Sports ==
- Frigg Oslo FK, a Norwegian sports club.
- Frigg Næstved, a Danish sports club.

== Others ==
- Frigg (band), a folk music band.
- MV Frigg, an oil tanker
- Frigg gas field, a natural gas field.
- Frigg UK System, a natural gas pipeline.
- Frigg Fjord

== See also ==
- Roman Frigg, a Swiss philosopher
- Frig (disambiguation)
