= The Machine (1977 film) =

1977 French film directed by Paul Vecchiali

- Theatrical release poster
- Directed by: Paul Vecchiali
- Written by: Paul Vecchiali
- Starring: Jean-Christophe Bouvet; Sonia Saviange; Monique Mélinand
- Production company: Diagonale
- Release date: September 14, 1977 (France)
- Running time: 100 minutes
- Country: France
- Language: French

The Machine (French: La Machine) is a 1977 French legal drama film directed by Paul Vecchiali. Centered on a child murder case, the film functions as a critique of capital punishment, which was then a subject of controversy in France prior to its 1981 abolition. The title refers to the social mechanism that leads to a man being sentenced to death and executed.

== Plot ==
Pierre Lentier, a pedophile in his late twenties, is imprisoned for murdering a young girl he had been trying to molest. The narration, both linear and non-linear, follows the legal proceedings and the media coverage of the crime: it is punctuated by comments and discussions about Lentier's background and mental illness and about the validity, and mostly lack thereof, of capital punishment. Several scenes mimic television news and debates.

The last act consists of Lentier's trial, during which he blames his crime on social repression and asserts that pedophilia is natural and beneficial to children, and his eventual execution by guillotine.

== Cast ==
- Jean-Christophe Bouvet as Pierre Lentier
- Sonia Saviange as Jeanne Dumont, Pierre's mother
- Monique Mélinand as prosecuting judge
- Maurice Gautier as police commissioner
- Serge Ferragutti as the victim's father
- Linda Gutemberg as the victim's mother
- Danièle Gain as Suzy
- Frédéric Norbert as Fred
- Michel Delahaye as Platon
- Jean-Claude Guiguet as Mistigri
- Marie-Claude Treilhou as Mimine
- Gérard Blain as reporter
- Louis Lyonnet as psychiatrist
- Paulette Bouvet as Lina
- Hélène Surgère as psychiatrist
- Paul Vecchiali as Altiani, Pierre's lawyer
- Jean-François Stévenin as bishop

== Production ==
Filming took place between 22 January and 16 March 1977.

Vecchiali, who aimed to make a statement against the death penalty but did not wish the film's narrative to be too one-sided, wrote only minimal dialogue, providing the actors with a canvas and giving them the freedom to conceive backgrounds for their own characters and ad-lib much of their lines.

== Home media ==
The film was released on DVD in 2015.
