= That's Life (1980 film) =

1980 drama film

- Directed by: Paul Vecchiali
- Screenplay by: Paul Vecchiali
- Starring: Chantal Delsaux; Hélène Surgère; Jean-Christophe Bouvet
- Cinematography: Georges Strouvé
- Edited by: Khadicha Bariha; Paul Vecchiali
- Music by: Roland Vincent
- Release date: 1980
- Language: French

That's Life (French: C'est la vie) is a 1980 French drama film written and directed by Paul Vecchiali. It was screened at the 37th Venice International Film Festival.

== Cast ==
- Chantal Delsaux as Ginette
- Hélène Surgère as Madame Delordre
- Jean-Christophe Bouvet as Richard
- Jacques Gibert as Alain
- Cécile Clairval as Rachat
- Liza Braconnier as Ève Artifice
- Ingrid Bourgoin as Simone Barbès
- Michel Delahaye as the Policeman
- Denise Farchy as Denise
- Béatrice Bruno as Emma
- Bénédict Beaugé as Serge Varazine

== Release ==
The film was screened at the 37th edition of the Venice Film Festival, in the Officina Veneziana sidebar.

== Reception ==
A contemporary Variety review described the film as a "talky look at female confession and suburban life" that "does have insights into personal problems but lacks the visual edge that Vecchiali was able to achieve in his best film, Femmes, Femmes". Éric Rohmer praised the film, and complained that Cahiers du Cinéma did not supported the film enough. Peter Cargin from Continental Film Review wrote: "C'est la vie, a French film from Paul Vecchiali, was certainly experimental, but cinema?", noting that "the film really would have been much more suitable for a radio piece."
