= Rowing Across the Atlantic =

- Directed by: Jean-François Laguionie
- Written by: Jean-François Laguionie; Jean-Pierre Gaspari
- Produced by: Jean-François Laguionie
- Starring: Charlotte Maury; Jean-Pierre Sentier
- Edited by: Claude Reznik
- Music by: Pierre Alrand
- Release date: May 1978
- Running time: 21 minutes
- Country: France
- Language: French

Rowing Across the Atlantic (French: La Traversée de l'Atlantique à la rame) is a 1978 French animated short film directed by Jean-François Laguionie. The film was scripted by Laguionie and Jean-Paul Gaspari and features the voices of Charlotte Maury and Jean-Pierre Sentier. It premiered at the 1978 Cannes Film Festival and was released in French cinemas on 25 October 1978.

== Summary ==
It tells the story of a couple who leave turn-of-the-century New York City in a rowing boat and spend their lives together forever in the Atlantic Ocean.

== Accolades ==
The film won the Short Film Palme d'Or at the 1978 Cannes Film Festival, the Grand Prize at the 1978 Ottawa International Animation Festival and the César Award for Best Animated Short Film at the 4th César Awards.

== See also ==
- French animation
- Titanic-seen in the film
