= Dominique Frot =

French actress (1957–2026)

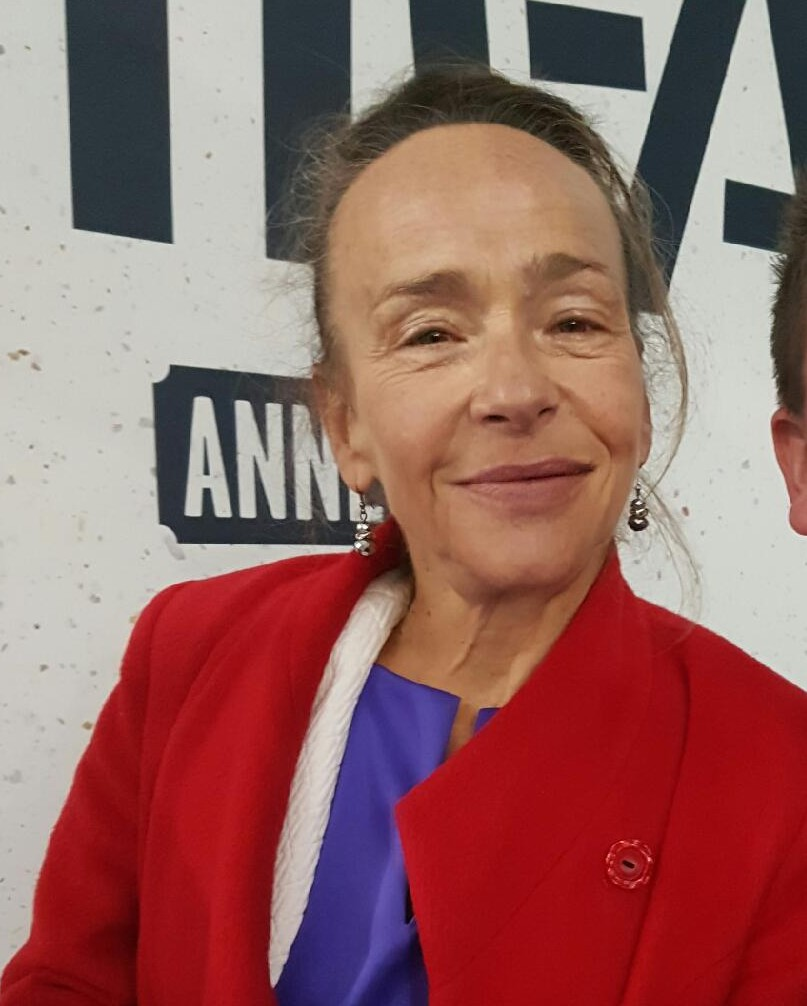
- Frot in 2016
- Born: Dominique Yvette Frot; 23 August 1957; Rochefort, France
- Died: 7 August 2026 (aged 68); Paris, France
- Education: Conservatoire national supérieur d'art dramatique École Normale de Musique de Paris
- Occupation: Actress

Dominique Yvette Frot (French: [dominˈik ivˈɛt fʁˈo]; 23 August 1957 – 7 August 2026) was a French actress.

== Life and career ==
Born in Rochefort on 23 August 1957, Frot was the sister of fellow actress Catherine Frot. A graduate of the Conservatoire national supérieur d'art dramatique and the École Normale de Musique de Paris, she had a successful career on the stage and on film. On 22 June 2018, she was named patron of the Saint-Aignan media library.

Frot died in Paris on 7 August 2026, at the age of 68.

== Filmography ==
- Enigma (1982)
- Deadly Circuit (1983)
- For Those I Loved (1983)
- The Vengeance of the Winged Serpent (1984)
- My True Love, My Wound (1987)
- La Cérémonie (1995)
- Don't Let Me Die on a Sunday (1999)
- Peut-être (1999)
- Vatel (2000)
- Two (2002)
- Bloody Mallory (2002)
- Three Blind Mice (2003)
- Textiles (2004)
- Inside (2007)
- Father of My Children (2009)
- Les Mains libres (2010)
- Sarah's Key (2010)
- Among the Living (2014)
- The Smell of Us (2014)
- Louise by the Shore (2016)
- Down in Paris (2021)
- Titane (2021)
- The Worst Ones (2022)
- Chopin, a Sonata in Paris (2025)
- Everything I Said I Wasn't (2027)
