= Gwen, or the Book of Sand =

1985 French animated science fiction film

- Directed by: Jean-François Laguionie
- Written by: Jean-François Laguionie; Jean-Pierre Gaspari
- Starring: Michel Robin
- Edited by: Hélène Arnal
- Music by: Pierre Alrand
- Production companies: La Fabrique; Films de da Demoiselle; Antenne 2
- Distributed by: Gaumont
- Release date: 6 February 1985
- Running time: 67 minutes
- Country: France
- Language: French

Gwen, or the Book of Sand (French: Gwen, ou le livre de sable) is a 1985 French animated science fiction film written and directed by Jean-François Laguionie, using gouache. It is alternatively known as Gwen, Gwen and the Book of Sand, Gwen, the Book of Sand and similar variations.

== Plot ==
Gwen is a young girl adopted by a nomad tribe in a desert post-apocalyptic world. In the desert, where only few animals, like ostriches or scorpions, can survive, a mysterious entity regularly drops gigantic replicas of everyday life objects from our world, such as bags, telephones, clocks and armchairs. When a young boy, Gwen's friend, is kidnapped by said entity, Gwen and an old woman called Roseline start on a trip to bring him back. They eventually encounter other people living in an isolated city and preserving remains of the old civilisation in strange ways.

== Cast ==
- Michel Robin as Roseline
- Lorella Di Cicco as Gwen
- Armand Babel as first twin
- Raymond Jourdan as second twin
- Saïd Amadis as nomad
- Bertrand Bautheac as nomad
- Jacques Bourier as nomad

== Accolades ==
The film won the Grand Prix de la critique at the Annecy International Animated Film Festival.

== Home media ==
The film was released in the United States as an Ultra HD Blu-ray by Deaf Crocodile Films in 2025, marking the film's first official American release.

== See also ==
- Cinema of France
- History of French animation
- List of animated feature films
- List of science-fiction films of the 1980s
