= Jean-François Laguionie =

French animator

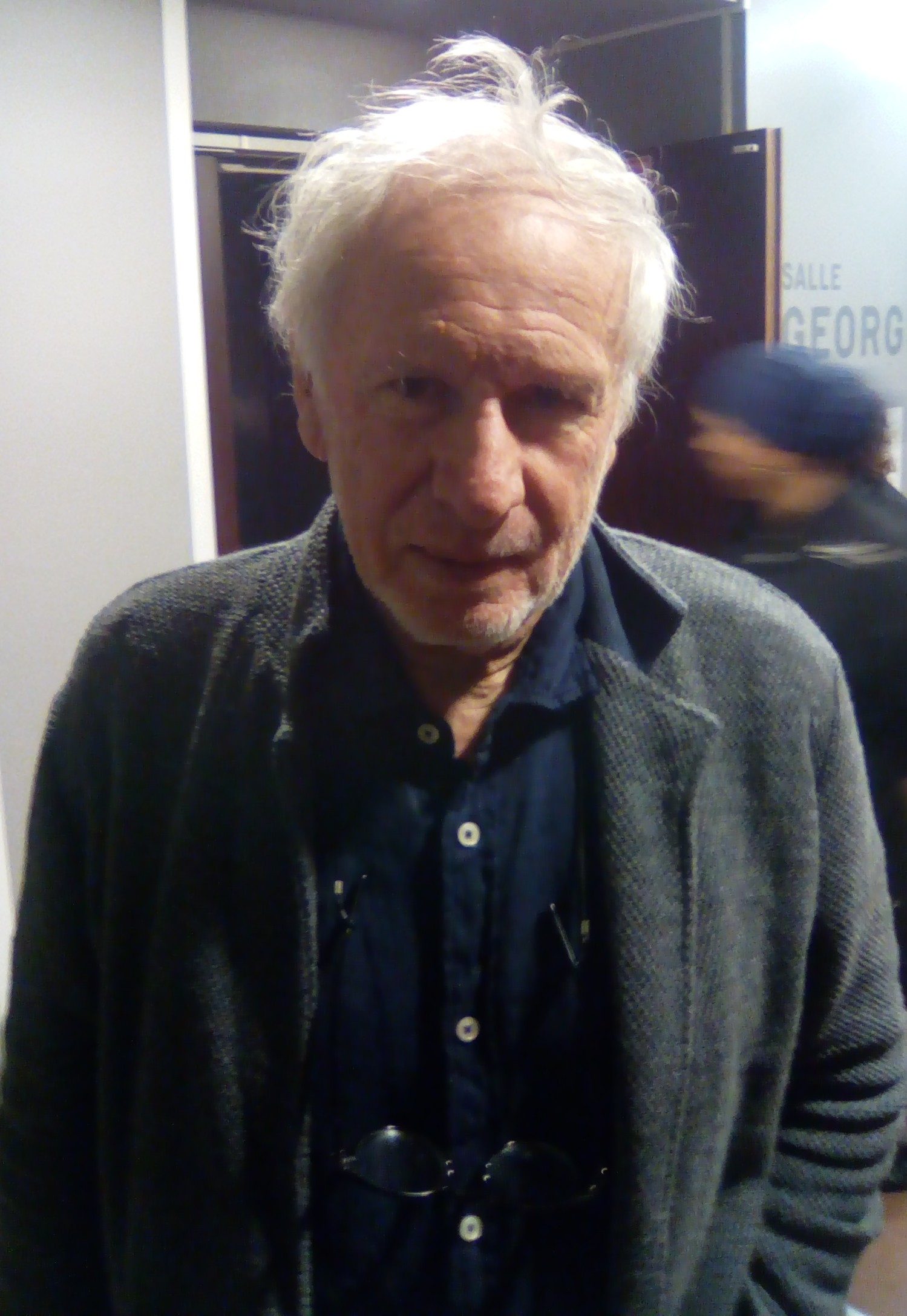
- Laguionie in 2016
- Born: 10 October 1939 (age 86); Besançon, Doubs, France
- Occupations: Director, producer, animator
- Years active: 1965–present

Jean-François Laguionie (born 10 October 1939) is a French animator, film director and producer.

== Biography ==
Laguionie was originally interested in theatre but his encounter with Paul Grimault gave him the opportunity to learn the techniques of animated film. Though they were very close to each other, Paul Grimault and Jean-François Laguionie rarely worked together (though Grimault produced Laguionie's first three shorts).

Jean-François Laguionie then directed several short films, climaxing with the now famous La Traversée de l'Atlantique à la rame (Rowing across the Atlantic) (1978), which won the Short Film Palme d'Or at the 1978 Cannes Film Festival, the Grand Prize at the 1978 Ottawa International Animation Festival and the César Award for Best Animated Short Film at the 4th César Awards.

He has also been a friend of Michel Ocelot, whose short film Les Trois inventeurs was shot in Laguionie's home studio and used the magnet-aided method of cutout animation invented by him.

While working on his first feature-length animated film, Gwen, or the Book of Sand (Gwen, le livre de sable) in 1985, "Jef" founded the animation studio "La Fabrique". Though appreciated by critics, Gwen only received rather limited popular acclaim.

== Later works ==
His second feature film, Le Château des singes (A Monkey's Tale co-directed with Xavier Picard) premiered in 1999. It received the Award for Best Animated Feature Film at the 5th Kecskemét Animation Film Festival.

His third feature L'Île de Black Mór (The Island of Black Mór), appeared in 2003.

In 2011, Laguionie completed work on Le Tableau (The Painting), a feature-length film which utilized a blend of animation and live-action. The film won the award for Best Feature Film at the 8th Festival of European Animated Feature Films and TV Specials.

== Filmography ==
- 1965: La Demoiselle et le violoncelliste (The Lady and the Cellist) (short)
- 1969: Une Bombe par hasard (A Random Bomb) (short)
- 1971: Plage privée (Private Beach) (short)
- 1978: Rowing Across the Atlantic (La Traversée de l'Atlantique à la rame) (short)
- 1985: Gwen, or the Book of Sand (Gwen, le livre de sable) (feature film)
- 1999: A Monkey's Tale (Le Château des singes) (feature film)
- 2003: Black Mor's Island (L'Île de Black Mór) (feature film)
- 2011: The Painting (Le Tableau) (feature film)
- 2016: Louise by the Shore (Louise en hiver) (feature film)
- 2019: The Prince's Voyage (Le Voyage du Prince) (feature film)
