= L'ile de Black Mór =

- Directed by: Jean-François Laguionie
- Written by: Jean-François Laguionie; Anik Leray
- Produced by: Gaspard de Chavagnac
- Edited by: Pascal Pachard
- Music by: Christophe Héral
- Release date: 11 February 2004
- Running time: 85 minutes
- Country: France
- Language: French

L'ile de Black Mór (Black Mor's Island) is a 2004 French animated adventure film directed by Jean-François Laguionie. Set in 1803, it follows a 15-year-old boy who sets out to find a buried pirate treasure. The film was released in France on 11 February 2004.

== Cast ==
- Taric Mehani as the Kid
- Agathe Schumacher as the Little Monch
- Jean-Paul Roussillon as Mac Gregor
- Jean-François Derec as La Ficelle
- Yanecko Romba as Master Forbes
- Frédéric Cerdal as the Director

== Reception ==
Variety's Lisa Nesselson wrote: "Handsome visuals and an especially classy instrumental score make this a quality adventure for kids, with enough narrative drive to keep adults engaged."
