= At the Top of the Stairs =

1983 film by Paul Vecchiali

- Directed by: Paul Vecchiali
- Written by: Paul Vecchiali additional dialogue: Cécile Clairval; Gérard Frot-Coutaz; Françoise Lebrun
- Cinematography: Georges Strouvé
- Edited by: Paul Vecchiali; Franck Mathieu; Charles Tible
- Music by: Roland Vincent
- Production company: Diagonale
- Release date: 12 October 1983
- Running time: 92 min
- Country: France / Switzerland
- Language: French

At the Top of the Stairs (French: En haut des marches) is a 1983 French drama film starring Danielle Darrieux, and was directed by Paul Vecchiali. It tells the story of a widow, who returns to a former house that had been hers 18 years after her husband was killed.

== Cast ==
- Danielle Darrieux as Françoise Canavaggia
- Hélène Surgère as Suzanne
- Françoise Lebrun as Michele
- Gisèle Pascal as Rose
- Sonia Saviange as Catherine
- Christine Laurent as Christine
- Micheline Presle as Mathilde
