= I Don't Kiss =

1991 film by André Téchiné

- Theatrical release poster
- Directed by: André Téchiné
- Written by: Jacques Nolot; André Téchiné; Michel Grisolia
- Produced by: Maurice Bernart; Jacques Eric Strauss; Jean Labadie
- Starring: Manuel Blanc; Philippe Noiret; Emmanuelle Béart; Hélène Vincent
- Cinematography: Thierry Arbogast
- Edited by: Claudine Merlin; Edith Vassard
- Music by: Philippe Sarde
- Distributed by: BAC Films
- Release date: 20 November 1991
- Running time: 115 minutes
- Country: France
- Language: French

I Don't Kiss (French: J'embrasse pas) is a 1991 French drama film directed by André Téchiné, starring Manuel Blanc, Emmanuelle Béart and Philippe Noiret. The plot follows a young man who leaves his provincial home in the Pyrenees, going to Paris, hoping to become an actor. A promising beginning is followed by disillusionment and he ends on the street as a prostitute. The film is a grim, melancholic portrait of a young man searching and failing to find meaning in his life. The film had a total of 472,187 admissions in France.

== Plot ==
Pierre, an idealistic twenty-year-old man, leaves his home in a remote district of the Pyrenees to travel to Paris, hoping to break away from his restrictive provincial life. Arriving in the French capital, he turns to the only person he knows in the city, Evelyne, a middle aged nurse, whom he had briefly met when working as a stretcher-bearer at Lourdes. She is vague and distracted, being preoccupied by the paralyzed mother with whom she lives. Nevertheless, she manages to get Pierre a job in the kitchen of a hospital. He finds somewhere to stay and, in order to fulfill his childhood dream, buys a book on how to become an actor.

A colleague at work, Said, takes him to dinner with two middle-aged men: they are both gay. The cellist, Dimitri, is Said's lover, and the intellectual television personality, Romain, is fascinated by Pierre but insists his interest is platonic. Pierre is disgusted by the evening and when Romain gives him a ride home and stops in a park that is a pick up point for hustlers, he walks off in a huff, refusing to get back into Romain's car. Evelyne takes Pierre to an expensive restaurant to make up for her earlier indifference. They return to her house and spend the night together. She offers him free accommodation, he moves in and they start an affair.

Pierre begins to attend acting classes but shows little talent. When he has to prepare for "Hamlet", he recites the role with no feelings and even forgets his lines. Humiliated, he flees in abandonment from his tentative ambition to become an actor.

His relationship with Evelyne also comes to an abrupt end. She feels that he does not really love her and breaks away from him. When she leaves him some money, Pierre feels insulted, returns the money, and leaves the place she had offered him. He goes absent from work pleading illness and eventually loses his job. Homeless and forced to sleep on the streets, he falls victim to thieves who steal all his belongings. Now broke and homeless, Pierre returns to the park where Romain took him in, and sees him again. Pierre's offer of sexual favors is refused, but Romain takes him on a trip to Spain. In Seville, the older man takes someone else as a lover and Pierre returns to Paris.

With no job or home, Pierre has to adopt prostitution as his only way to make money. He makes his rules very clear to prospective male clients: "I don't kiss, I don't suck, I don't get fucked". Despite his initial aversion to sex with men, Pierre manages to make a success of his new career. During a police crackdown on streetwalkers, he meets Ingrid, another prostitute. He becomes infatuated with Ingrid, whose dream had been to become a singer. Both are arrested and after a night in jail, they spend an idyllic day together. They make love, but their liaison is discovered by her pimp, who with his gang beats up and rapes Pierre, forcing Ingrid to watch.

Pierre leaves Paris and joins the paratroops; he voices to an interviewing officer a desire for revenge, and also for the "leap into the void" involved in parachuting at night. On a visit home, he tells his brother that he did not hate the city, he just was not ready for it. On release from his service, and about to leave once again for Paris and an open future, Pierre stops off at the beach, takes his clothes off and wanders into the sea.

== Cast ==
- Manuel Blanc as Pierre
- Philippe Noiret as Romain
- Emmanuelle Béart as Ingrid
- Hélène Vincent as Evelyne
- Ivan Desny as Dimitri
- Roschdy Zem as Saïd
- Christophe Bernard as Le Mac
- Michèle Moretti as The Drama teacher

== Background ==
The story is directly inspired by the experience of Jacques Nolot. It is based on the unpublished novel titled The First Step, which Nolot wrote, and then turned into a screenplay.

== DVD release ==
The film was released on DVD 22 July 2008 in the U.S. as part of a Boxset of Téchiné's films. The film is in French with English and Spanish subtitles. I Don't Kiss is also available in Region 2 DVD.

== Reception ==
Armand White from Film Comment opined that the film "diverges from Fassbinder melodramas, which used the genre for social critique. Techine has a different, uncynical engagement with pop drama — a gay insight that drays fascination, inspiration, as well as healthy skeptical distaste for the myths and traditions of narrative hegemony. In J'embrasse pas, the social betrayals are enlarged beyond Fassbinder's misanthropy into an admittedly French acknowledgment of human nature."

Film critic Peter Aspden wrote "the malaise which permeates J’embrasse pas is relentless; there is never any doubt that Pierre's sad attempt to escape the monotony of provincial life will end disastrously in the violent, loveless streets of modern-day Paris; the overload of metaphors hides the lack of a substantive conclusion."

== See also ==
- List of French-language films
- List of LGBTQ-related films of 1991
