= Little Gay Boy =

- Directed by: Antony Hickling
- Written by: Antony Hickling
- Produced by: H&A films, Antony Hickling
- Starring: Gaëtan Vettier, Manuel Blanc, Amanda Dawson, Gala Besson
- Cinematography: Christopher Rivoiron, Amaury Grisel, Tom Chabbat
- Edited by: Victor Toussaint
- Music by: Xavier Bussy, Anna Brooke
- Distributed by: The Open Reel (Italy) – Sales Agency, Optimale France
- Release date: 2013
- Running time: 72 minutes
- Country: France
- Languages: French, English

Little Gay Boy is a French film directed by Antony Hickling in 2013. It has been screened at LGBTQ film festivals around the world and had a cinema release in Paris, France 2013.

== Plot ==
The film centers around a young man Jean-Christophe (J.C) played by Gaëtan Vettier. Born to a prostitute mother and an absent father, J-C. experiments with his sexuality and pushes the limits of his identity, until the day he finally meets this fantasized father. Between raw violence and phantasmagoric reveries, J-C. finds his own path and gradually free himself from the demons of the past.

== Cast ==
- Gaëtan Vettier: J.C
- Manuel Blanc: God
- Amanda Dawson: Maria
- Gala Besson: Angel Gabriel
- Biño Sauitzvy: Danser

== Awards ==
- The Trilogy (Little Gay Boy, Where Horses Go To Die & Frig) receives the Christian Petermann award for an innovative work. Controversial scenarios expressed through music, dance and daring at the IV DIGO – Goias Sexual diversity and gender international Film Festival, Brazil, 2019
- Special Mention for his work as a director at Rio FICG, Brazil, 2015
- Little Gay Boy – Special mention from the Jury. Chéries-Chéris, France, 2013
