= Jean-Marie Besset =

French contemporary playwright, translator and theater director

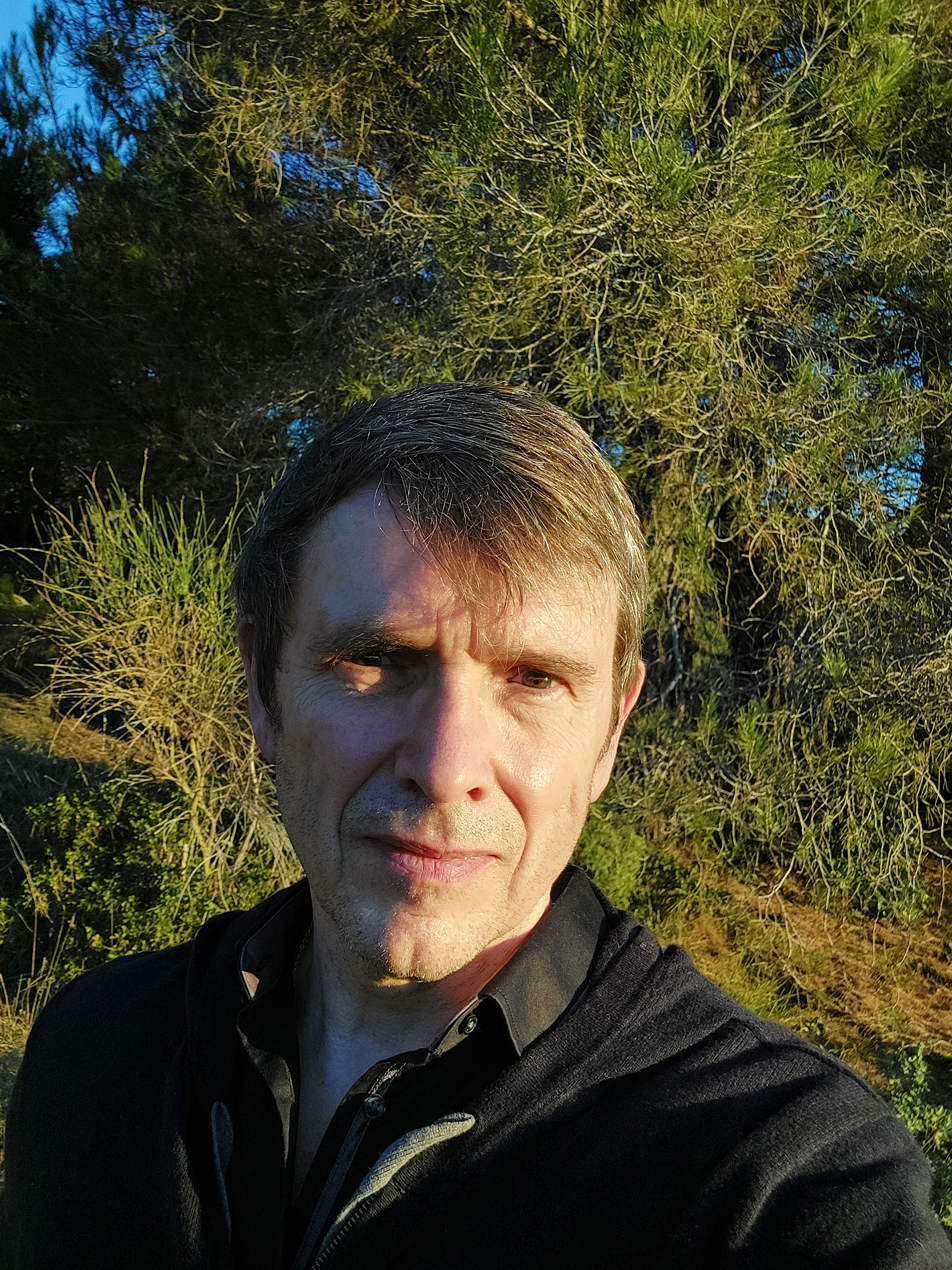
Jean-Marie Besset portrait

Jean-Marie Besset (born 1959) is a French contemporary playwright, translator and theater director.

He has been nominated ten times for the Molière award (France's Tony Award) - six times as Best Playwright and four times as Best Translator. He won in 1999 for his adaptation of Michael Frayn's Copenhagen. He won the Best New Play award from the Syndicat National de la Critique Dramatique (Association of French Critics) for Ce qui arrive et ce qu'on attend in 1993, the New Theater Talent prize from the SACD (Society of Dramatic Authors and Composers), also in 1993, and the Grand prix du théâtre de l'Académie française in 2005. He was named Chevalier (1995) and Officier (2002) in the Ordre des Arts et des Lettres, and Chevalier in the Ordre national du Mérite (2009) by the French government.

== Early life and career ==
Born in Carcassonne on November 22, 1959, Besset spent his youth in Limoux, a small town in the southwest of France and continued his studies in Paris following the baccalauréat. After graduating from the École supérieure des sciences économiques et commerciales (ESSEC) in 1981 and the Institut d'Etudes Politiques de Paris in 1984, he began to pursue his career as a playwright. After fulfilling his national service at the French Institute in London (1984–85), he lived in New York from 1986 to 1998.

In 1999, he returned to France to become the artistic director of the Théâtre de l'Atelier, a landmarked Paris theatre acquired by Laura Pels. In 2000, in partnership with producer/director Gilbert Désveaux, he formed the company BCDV THEATRE to initiate and mount projects (among which was a summer theatre festival, NAVA – New Authors in the Aude Valley.)

Besset was elected onto the board of the Society of French Playwrights (SACD) from 2001-2003 and again in 2009. He was a literary consultant for the Theatre du Rond Point from 2002 until 2009. He held the position of Director of the Centre-Dramatique National du Languedoc-Roussillon in Montpelier from 2010 until 2013.

His first play Villa Luco, directed by Jacques Lassalle, with Hubert Gignoux as Philippe Pétain, Maurice Garrel as Charles de Gaulle and the author himself as a young warden, premiered at Théâtre National de Strasbourg in May 1989. It was subsequently produced in Paris, Théâtre Paris Villette, and on tour throughout France and Belgium (1990). The author was profiled in the International Herald Tribune that same year (Of Television, Molière and de Gaulle by Thomas Quinn Curtiss, November 26, 1990).

Besset's other plays include:

- LA FONCTION (1985)
- FÊTE FOREIGN (1986)
- CE QUI ARRIVE ET CE QU’ON ATTEND (1988)
- GRANDE ÉCOLE (1990)
- MARIE HASPARREN (1992)
- UN CŒUR FRANÇAIS (1995)
- BARON (1997)
- COMMENTAIRE D’AMOUR (1998)
- L’ECOLE DE NEW YORK (2000)
- RUE DE BABYLONE (2002)
- LES GRECS (2003)
- RER (2005)
- PERTHUS (2007)
- UN COUPLE IDEAL (2008)
- ROCH FERRE, UN CAS DE MEDECINE LEGALE (2009)
- JE NE VEUX PAS ME MARIER (2009)
- LE BANQUET D’AUTEUIL (2011)
- LA FILLE ET LE GARÇON (2012)

Besset has co-written two comedic plays with Régis de Martrin-Donos:

- LE KINE DE CARCASSONNE (2011)
- A LA GUERRE COMME A LA GUERRE (2012).

Besset has also directed and co-directed a number of plays, including some of his own:

- COMMENTAIRE D’AMOUR (2000)
- BARON (2002)
- LES GRECS (2003)
- LE JOUR DU DESTIN (2003)
- ONCLE PAUL (2004)
- TROIS JOURS DE PLUIE (2004)
- UN CHEVAL (2005)
- IL FAUT JE NE VEUX PAS (2010)
- LE GARCON SORT DE L'OMBRE (2011)

== American career ==
His first American production came in 1992 when UBU Repertory Theatre showcased his The Best of Schools, translated by Mark O'Donnell, directed by Evan Yionoulis, starring Jonathan Freedman, Gil Bellows, Mira Sorvino, Danny Zorn. This debut was praised by Clive Barnes in the New York Post and got a mixed review in The New York Times, March 11, 1992 by D.J.R. Bruckner.

His first American success was the New York Theatre Workshop's production of What You Get And What You Expect translated by Hal J. Witt, directed by Christopher Ashley. The play was very favorably reviewed by Bruce Weber in The New York Times. Michael Feingold in the Village Voice,

His play Perthus premiered in French at the Spoleto Festival in 2008, directed by Gilbert Désveaux starring Alain Marcel, Jean-Paul Muel, and newcomers Jonathan Drillet and Robin Causse.

== Film ==
At the invitation of Ismail Merchant, he wrote in 1996 the original screenplay of The Proprietor a Merchant Ivory Production starring Jeanne Moreau.

Two movies based on his plays have been released in the US: Grande École directed by Robert Salis (2004, based on The Best of Schools) and The Girl on the Train directed by André Téchiné (2009, based on RER)

More recently, Jean-Marie adapted Alan Ayckbourn's Life of Riley, which has been made into a film by Alain Resnais - Aimer, Boire et Chanter (2014). The film received critical praise. It holds a score of 70 on Metacritic.
