= Where Horses Go to Die =

- Directed by: Antony Hickling
- Written by: Antony Hickling Céline Solignac
- Produced by: H&A films
- Starring: Jean-Christophe Bouvet; Manuel Blanc; Amanda Dawson; Walter Dickerson
- Cinematography: Yann Gadaud
- Edited by: Victor Toussaint
- Music by: Loki Starfish, Xavier Bussy, Anna Brooke
- Distributed by: Optimale France
- Release date: 2016
- Running time: 67 minutes
- Country: France
- Languages: French, English

Where Horses Go to Die is a 2016 French film directed by Antony Hickling. The film had a cinema release at St André des Arts cinema in Paris, France 2016.

== Plot ==
Visual artist, Daniel wanders the night in search of inspiration. In the midst of reveries and fantasies, he will cross paths with Manuela, Divine and Candice, three nocturnal angels who will take him on a journey to the end of desire.

== Cast ==
- Jean-Christophe Bouvet as Daniel
- Manuel Blanc as Manuela / Marco
- Amanda Dawson as Candice
- Walter Dickerson as Divine
- Luc Bruyere as Mohammed

== Awards ==
- The Trilogy ( Where Horses Go To Die, Little Gay Boy, & Frig) receives the Christian Petermann award for an innovative work. Controversial scenarios expressed through music, dance and daring at the IV DIGO – Goias Sexual diversity and gender international Film Festival, Brazil, 2019
- Special Mention for his work as a director at Rio FICG, Brazil, 2015
