= Reelout Queer Film Festival =

LGBTQ film festival in Ontario, Canada

- Locations: Kingston, Canada
- Years active: 1999-present
- Founder: Marney McDiarmid
- Most recent: Opening: January 29, 2026; Closing: February 7, 2026
- Website: reelout.com

The Reelout Queer Film Festival is an annual LGBTQ film festival in Kingston, Ontario.

In 2010, the festival was briefly the subject of controversy when its application to present a program of short films directed by women at the Kingston Women's Art Festival was denied.

== History ==
=== Founding ===
The festival was established in 1999 by Marney McDiarmid, a Queen's University graduate, with resource assistance from both the university and Ontario Public Interest Research Group. In the first year, films were screened at the city's gay bar, Club 477. In its second year, the festival moved to the Screening Room theatre, which has remained its primary venue ever since; the volunteers at the 2000 festival included Matt Salton, now the festival's director.

=== Recent years ===
In years after the COVID-19 pandemic, the festival has been facing financial struggles. The festival's latest instalment, in 2026, saw a big decline in funding. Matt Salton, the executive director, shared that the festival has lost a lot of its private-sector funding. At the same time, the festival was recently removed from Queen's University's Alma Mater Society ballot in the 2024-2025 school year.

== See also ==
- List of LGBT film festivals
- List of film festivals in Canada
