= Antony Hickling =

French film maker and actor

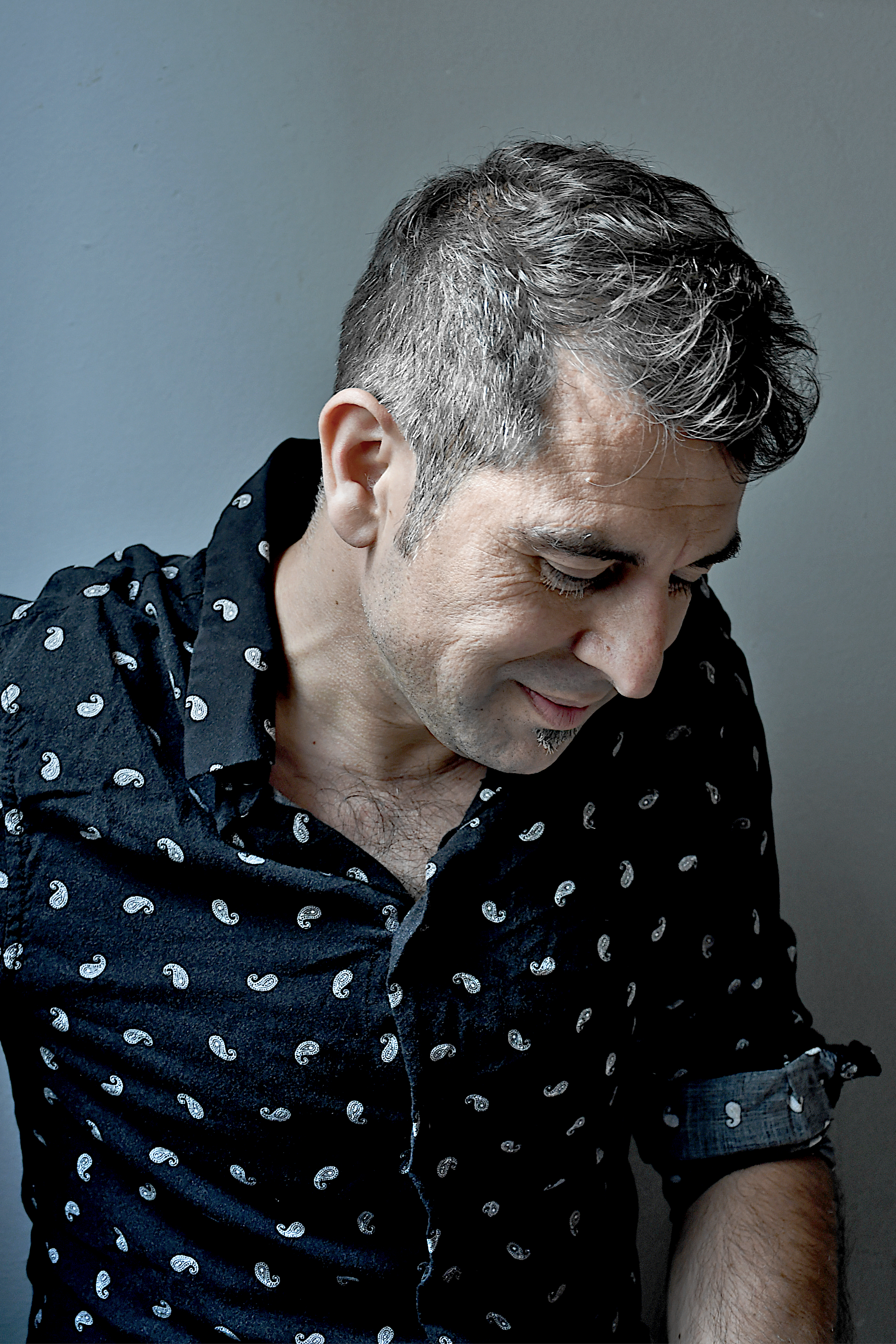
- Hickling in 2024
- Born: 8 November 1975 (age 50); Johannesburg, South Africa
- Education: Arden School of Theatre, Paris 8 University Vincennes-Saint-Denis
- Occupations: Actor, director, writer

Antony Hickling (born 8 November 1975) is an English independent filmmaker, actor, writer, voiceover artist, and professor.

== Biography ==
Antony Hickling was born in Johannesburg, South Africa, to an Indian father and an English mother of Italian origin. At a young age, he moved to the United Kingdom, where his family settled in Greater Manchester. There, he trained as an actor at Manchester University's Arden School of Theatre.

After working in London's theatre scene for several years, he relocated to Paris to study at Paris 8 University Vincennes-Saint-Denis. After obtaining a Master of Arts, he was invited to pursue a PhD but left his doctorate in Performing Arts unfinished to focus on a career in cinema.

In 2012, he trained as a director at the European Center for Film Production (CEFPF) in Paris under Belgian filmmaker Harry Cleven. His work, which explores themes of Queer identity, has been screened at LGBTQ film festivals worldwide. Beyond filmmaking, Hickling continues to work as an actor and voice artist, contributing to animated films, documentaries, video games, and major advertising campaigns around the world. Antony Hickling obtained French citizenship in 2018.

Since 2023, he has taught theatre and on‑camera acting at Cours Florent. In 2026, he was appointed director of the BA (Hons) Acting programme, offered at Cours Florent in both French and English and accredited by Regent's University London.

== Films ==
Hickling's films are characterized by his underground film style, rich in religious symbolism, metaphors, and explicit sexual depictions. His trilogy of films—Little Gay Boy, Where Horses Go To Die, and Frig—concludes what he describes as the first chapter of his career. Both Frig and Little Gay Boy were restricted to audiences over 18 in France by the Centre national du cinéma et de l'image animée, a classification typically applied to films containing simulated sex or extreme violence.

Hickling's early works experimented with unconventional cinematic storytelling, using visual techniques and themes exploring identity, sexuality, and spirituality. His films often defy traditional narrative structures, blending surreal imagery with raw, emotional performances. His approach established him as a distinctive voice in contemporary queer cinema, leading to screenings at international LGBTQ film festivals and retrospectives recognising his contributions to the genre.

With Down in Paris, he transitioned toward a more traditional narrative style while retaining his unique artistic voice. The film, noted for its introspective storytelling and atmospheric cinematography, marked the beginning of a new phase in his work, highlighting themes of personal crisis, creative struggle, and urban isolation.

His documentary An Afternoon with Patrick Sarfati offers an intimate portrait of the French photographer, demonstrating Hickling's ability to adapt his directorial style to non-fiction filmmaking. The film, recognized for its sensitive exploration of Sarfati's life and artistry, further highlights Hickling's range as a filmmaker. In 2026, he completed shooting his next feature film, Everything I Said I Wasn't, in Paris, produced by Vivàsvan Pictures and AH Films.

== Filmography ==
=== Director ===
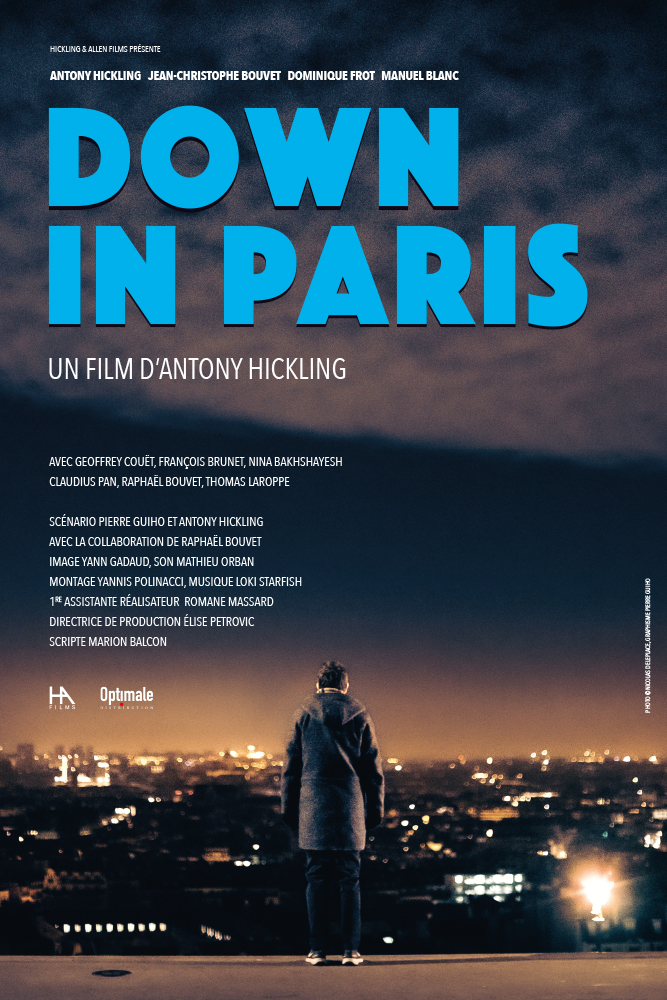
Poster of Down in Paris 2021

Year	Title	Role	Notes
2010	Birth 1, 2 & 3	Director & Writer	Three experimental shorts films - 25min
2012	Q.J	Director & Writer	Short film - 5min
2013	Little Gay Boy	Director & Writer	Experimental feature film - 72min
2014	One Deep Breath	Director & Writer	Experimental feature film - 56min
2014	PD	Director & Writer	Experimental short film - 8min
2016	Where Horses Go To Die	Director & Writer	Feature film - 67min
2017	Loki Starfish: Eyes on the Highway	Director	Music video
2018	Frig	Director & Writer	Experimental feature film - 60min
2019	Queer I	Director & Writer	Experimental short film - 7min
2021	Down in Paris	Director & Writer	Feature film - 102 min
2023	An Afternoon with Patrick Sarfati	Director & Writer	Documentary film - 75 min
2024	Ella	Director, Writer Benedict Wells	Short film - 5O min
2025	Break a Leg	Director	Short film - 38 min
2027	Everything I said I wasn't	Director & Writer	Feature Film - 94min

=== Actor ===
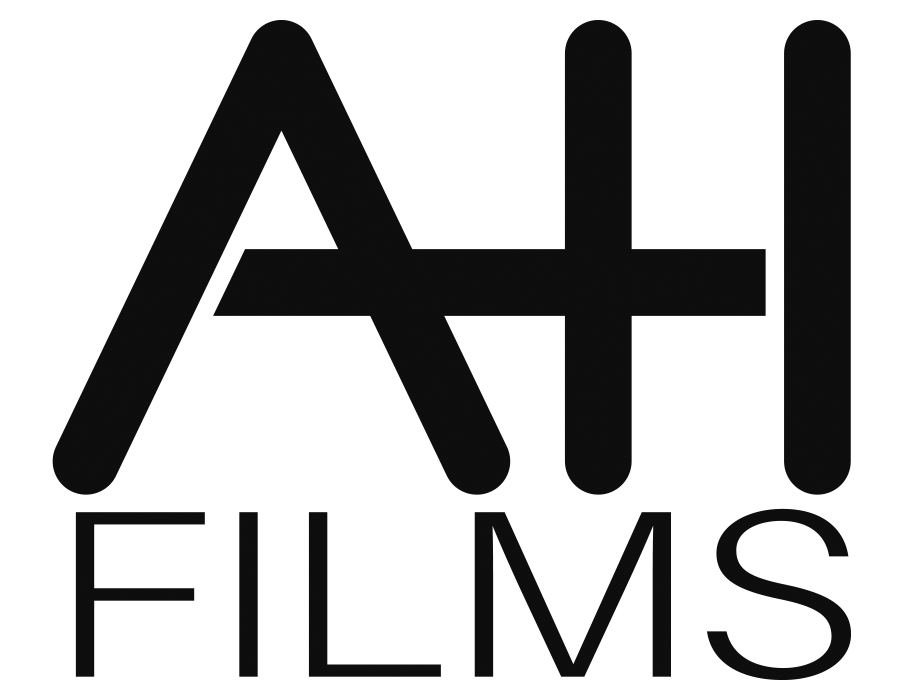
Logo of AH Films, founded by Antony Hickling in 2025

Year	Title	Role	Notes
1999	Love in the 21st Century with Colin Farrell	Kevin (Episode 6)	TV series
2000	Where the Heart Is	Indian Waiter	TV series (1 episode)
2006	The Romantics	The witness	TV series
2006	Boom Boom Clap	Stuart	Short film
2007	Give & Take	Danny	Short film
2008	8th Wonderland	Dany	Film
2010	Arthur 3: The War of the Two Worlds	Douglas	Film
2010	All Hallows'een	Hugh Travers	Short film
2012	Worse	The man	Short film
2014	Love in Paris (Saison 6 des Mystères de l'amour)	Neurologue	French TV series
2014	The sky above Bastille (Le ciel au-dessus de Bastille)	Derek Anger	Experimental Film
2016	Eric et Quentin	The American	French TV Canal+
2021	The Butcher's Daughter	Sid Kharish	Film
2021	The Biggest Fan	Tony Williams	Film
2021	Down in Paris	Richard Barlow	Film
2021	Black Box	Collaborater	Film
2022	Lupin (French TV series)	Max Moller	Serie Netflix
2023	Hard Skills	Greg	Film
2025	Ligne Jaune	Himself	Short Film
2027	Everything I Said I Wasn't	Professor	Film

== Theatre ==
Year	Title	Role	Theatre	Director
1995	Miss Julie with Amanda Donohoe	Peasant	Royal Exchange Manchester	Braham Murray
1999	Skin	Chris	Manchester	Helen Parry
1999	The Giraffe and the Pelly and Me	Monkey	Polka Theatre	Roman Stefanski
2000	A different place	Able	English Touring Theatre	Erica Whyman
2000	The Winter's Tale	Florizel	Southwark Playhouse	Erica Whyman
2001	Unsuitable girls	Ashok	Pilot Theatre	Kully Thiarai
2001	Death of a Salesman with Joseph Marcell	Bernard	Leicester Haymarket Theatre	Kully Thiarai
2002	Dolly West's Kitchen	Jamie O'Brien	Leicester Haymarket Theatre	Paul Kerryson
2003	A man astray	Douglas	Soho Theatre	Erica Whyman
2004	La question aux pieds nus	Lui	Théâtre Déjazet	Jacques Clancy
2009	The Dumb Waiter	Ben	Monfort-Théâtre	Lucille O'Flanagan
2009	Romeo and Juliet	Romeo	Monfort-Théâtre	Daniel Soulier

== Voice Over and Dubbing ==
=== Films ===
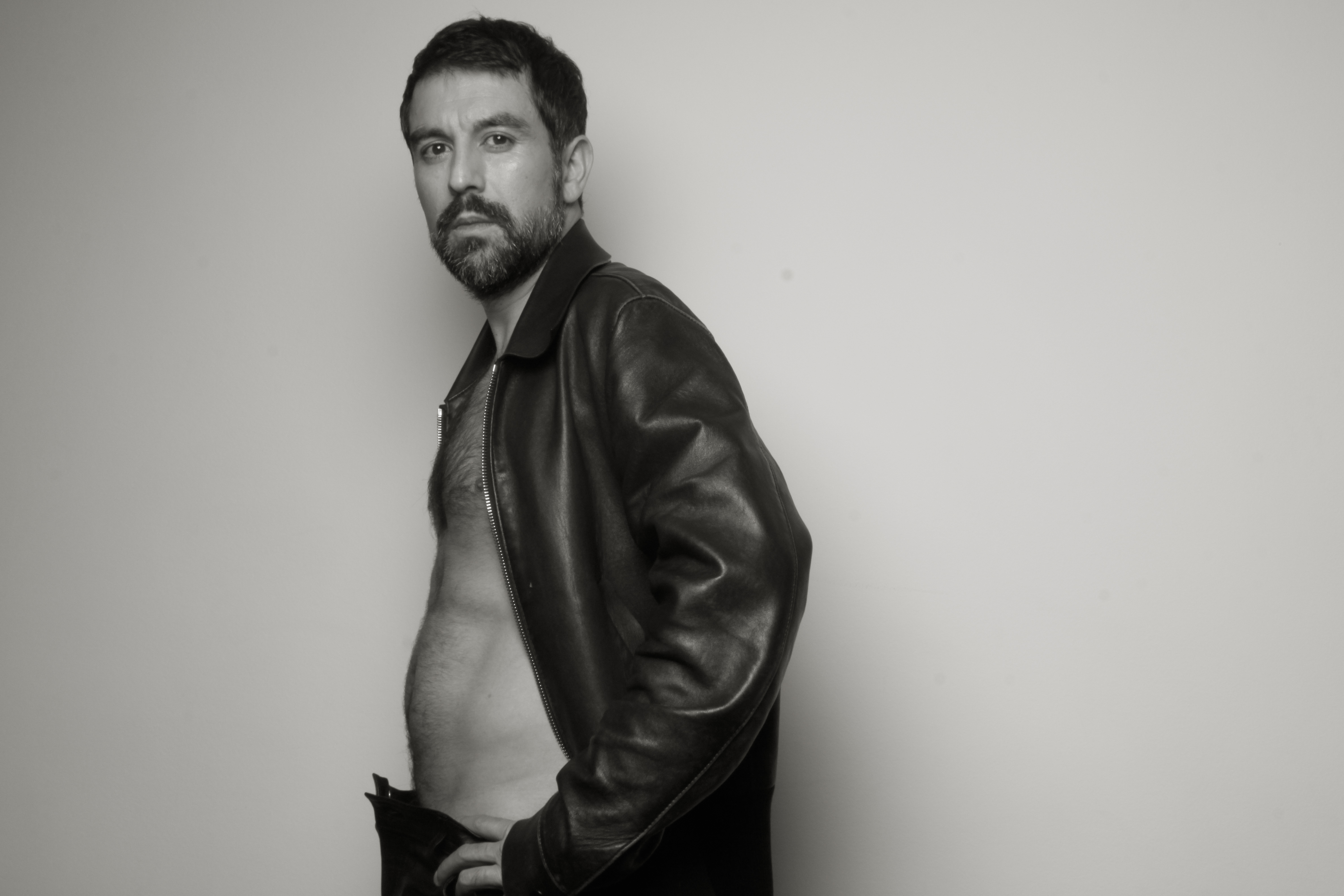
Portrait of Antony Hickling by Alfredo Salazar 2019

Year	Title	Role	Notes
2011	The Lady	BBC Journalist	Film
2012	My Way	Post production Voice Over	Film
2014	Rapace	Journalist	French TV Film
2014	Misunderstood	Ricky	Film
2015	The Parisian Bitch, Princess of Hearts	William	Film
2018	Kursk	Post production voices	Film
2018	Frig	Narrator	Film

=== Animation Movies ===
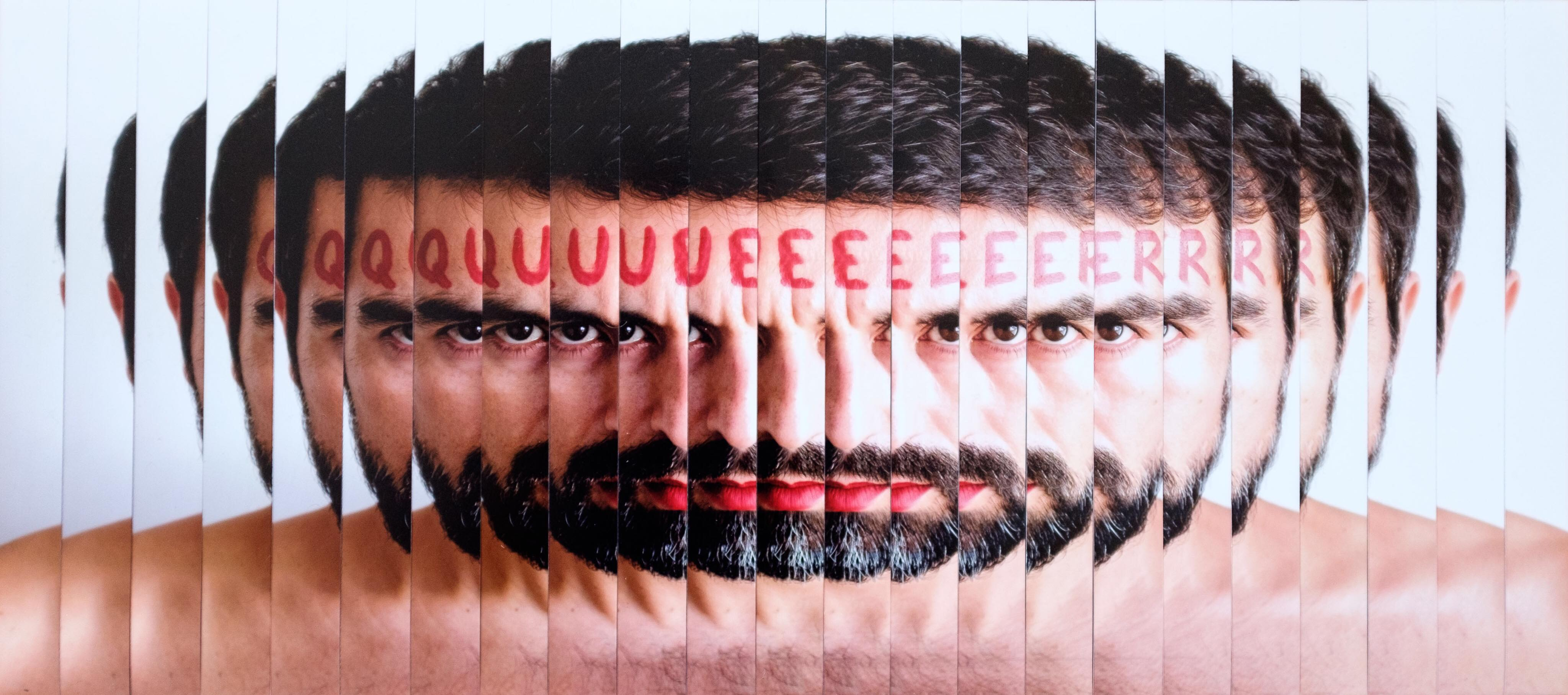
"Queer" portrait of Antony Hickling by Emmanuel Barrouyer (2018)

Year	Title	Role	Notes
2015	Mouk	Voiced several characters	Animation TV Series
2015	Long Way North	Larson	Film
2016	Louise by the Shore	Tom the parachutist	Film
2016	Ballerina	Victor - reference voice	Film
2017-2021	Cartoonito (French TV channel)	Presenter	TV Series

=== Documentary ===
Year	Title	Production	Notes
2015	Pansy - Les Pensées de Paul	Canal+ France, Bangumi Productions	TV
2017	The War of the Aces (La Guerre des As)	Arte France, Indigenes Productions	TV Series
2018	Snake tracker (Traqueur de serpents)	Planète+	TV Animal Documentary
2021	The Miracles of Jesus (Les Miracles de Jésus)	Pernel Media	TV
2022	Munich 72, des jeux et du sang - 2	Pernel Media, Arte	TV
2022	Snapshot of History (Instantané d'Histoire)	ECPAD, ZED, Arte	TV
2022	China perseverance (Chine perseverance)	Arte	TV
2022	The Animal Factory (L'usine des Animaux)	Arte	TV
2023	Butterflies, superheroes of nature (Les Papillons, ces super-héros de la nature Version)	Pernel Media, Arte	TV
2023	The Mayas: from the mystery of their origins to the fall (Les Mayas : du mystère des origines à la chute)	Pernel Media, Arte	TV
2024	The Joan of Arc case (L'affaire Jeanne d'Arc)	Program33	TV
2024	Genius of builders (Génie des bâtisseurs)	Pernel Media, Planète+	TV
2025	Incas	Pernel Media, CNC	TV
2025	Erik Satie	Allumage, Arte	TV
2025	Jaguars (Au nom des Jaguars)	Pernel Media, France Télévisions	TV
2025	The War of the Worlds by Cyril Leuthy (La guerre des mondes)	10.7 Productions, Arte	TV
2025	Pharaohs at War (Pharaons en guerre) by Anne Viry-Babel	Pernel Media, Histoire TV	TV
2025	Jimmy Somerville - Smalltown Boy by SIMONNET (OLIVIER)	13 Productions, Arte, POP' Films	TV
2026	The magical world of amphibians by Stéphane Jacques	Pernel Media, Arte	TV

=== Video Games ===
Year	Title	Role	Notes
2010	Heavy Rain	Gordi Kramer	action-adventure video game
2012	Les Aventures de Tintin	Voiced several characters	action-adventure video game

== Film Festival Focus, Jury and Conference ==
- Jury, Chéries-Chéris Paris, France 2012
- Jury, Serile Filmului Gay International Film Festival 2012, Cluj-Napoca, Romania.
- Member of the board of directors and programmer for the festival Chéries-Chéris, Paris, France, from 2013 to 2016.
- Jury, TGLFF, Torino Gay and Lesbian Film Festival, Italy 2015
- Jury & Focus, Timi Shorts- Timișoara, Romania 2015
- Round table discussion with Randal Kleiser, about the current state of contemporary LGBTQI cinéma for the Champs-Élysées Film Festival, Paris Paris 2017
- Focus on his work at BIG!ff – Bari International Gender film festival Italy 2018, sponsored by Apulia Film Commission Italy.
- Focus on his work at Rio Festival de Gênero & Sexualidade no Cinema 2018
- Focus on his work at the festival cultural de diversidad sexual y género, Cuernavaca, Mexico 2018.
- Focus on his work at Chéries-Chéris MK2, Paris, France 2018
- Hybrida [GeSex#1] International colloquium on gender and sexuality perspectives in contemporary Francophone artistic-literary creation University of Valencia 2018
- Focus on his work at Queer Zagreb, Perforacije Festival Zagreb, Croatia 2019
- Jury, Sadique-master film festival, Paris 2019
- Focus on his work at The IV DIGO – Goias Sexual diversity and gender international Film Festival, Brazil 2019.
- Focus on his work for Semana Rainbow, A Universidade Federal de Juiz de Fora (UFJF), Brasil 2019
- Carte Blanche for the 25th edition of L'Etrange Film Festival, Forum des Images, Paris, France 2019
- Retrospective & Masterclass at The International Queer Film Festival Merlinka or Merlinka festival, Belgrade, Serbia 2019
- Jury & Masterclass, Zinegoak, Bilbao International Film Festival (Basque Country) Spain, 2020
- Retrospective TLVFest, Tel Aviv's International LGBT Film Festival, Israel, Sept 2020.
- Jury, The International Queer Film Festival Merlinka or Merlinka festival, Belgrade, Serbia 2021
- Jury, image+nation culture queer Image+Nation, 35th Edition, Montreal, Canada, Nov 2022

== Awards ==
- Down in Paris wins: Best Director, Queer international Film Festival, Playa del Carmen, Mexico, November 2022
- Down in Paris wins: Best Director for a Feature Film (International), Yellowstone International Film Festival, New Delhi, India, October 2022
- Antony Hickling for Down in Paris wins The Kim Renders Memorial Award for Outstanding Performance Reelout Queer Film Festival, Canada, Feb 2022
- Down in Paris wins season award nomination for Best Feature Live Action Narrative | Manchester Lift-Off, United Kingdom, 2022
- Down in Paris obtained the Arthouse Recommendation from the French Association of Arthouse Cinemas on 24 February 2022
- Down in Paris wins Best Narrative Feature for the 39th Reeling: The Chicago LGBTQ+ International Film Festival OCT 2021
- The Trilogy (Little Gay Boy, Where Horses Go To Die & Frig) receives the Christian Petermann award for an innovative work. Controversial scenarios expressed through music, dance and daring at the IV DIGO – Goias Sexual diversity and gender international Film Festival, Brazil, 2019
- One Deep Breath – Best experimental feature at Zinegoak film festival in Bilbao, Spain, 2015
- Special Mention for his work as a director at Rio FICG, Brazil, 2015
- Holy Thursday (The Last supper) – Special mention from the Jury. Chéries-Chéris, France, 2013
