= Paul Vecchiali =

French filmmaker and author (1930–2023)

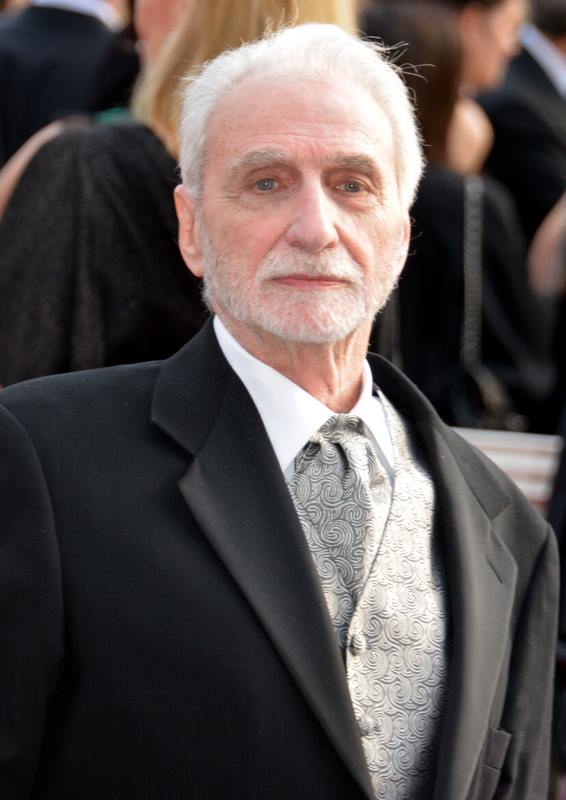
- Vecchiali in 2016
- Born: April 28, 1930; Ajaccio, Corsica, France
- Died: January 18, 2023 (aged 92); Gassin, Var, France
- Occupations: Film director; screenwriter; film producer; author
- Years active: 1961–2023
- Known for: Encore

Paul Vecchiali (28 April 1930 – 18 January 2023) was a French filmmaker and author.

== Biography ==
Vecchiali was born in Ajaccio, Corsica, and grew up in Toulon. His father was accused of collaborationism after the Second World War.

In 1977, Vecchiali founded the production company Diagonale, through which he produced and distributed his own films as well as works by filmmakers including Marie-Claude Treilhou, Jean-Claude Biette and Jean-Claude Guiguet.

Vecchiali greatly admired French popular cinema of the 1930s, while his own films combined popular forms with a persistent interest in formal experimentation.

Encore was the first French film to depict the AIDS crisis, addressing it through the life of a gay man.

Vecchiali died in Gassin, Var, on 18 January 2023, at the age of 92.

== Selected filmography ==
- Les Ruses du diable (1965)
- L'Étrangleur (1972)
- Femmes Femmes (1974)
- Change pas de main (1975)
- La Machine (1977)
- Corps à cœur (1978)
- That's Life (C'est la vie) (1980)
- At the Top of the Stairs (1983)
- Rosa la rose, fille publique (1985)
- Encore / Once More (1988)
- The Guys in the Cafe (1989)
- Wonder Boy (1994)
- Zone Franche (1996)
- Love Reinvented (1997)
- Tears of AIDS (1999)
- A Vot' Bon Cœur (2004)
- A Diagonal Portrait of Paul Vecchiali (2005)
- Le Cancre (2016)

== Bibliography ==
- Vesperales (2008)
