= Khattab =

Khattab may refer to:

== People ==
- Zayd ibn al-Khattab, one of the Companions of the Prophet
- Fatima bint al-Khattab, Companion of the Prophet
- Al-Khattab ibn Nufayl, Chief of the Meccan branch of the Quraysh tribe
- Umar, one of the Rashidun
- Abdelkareem Khattab, Jordanian Paralypmic powerlifter
- Abdullah Khattab, Saudi footballer
- Ali Khattab, Egyptian musician
- Anas Khattab, Syrian politician
- Jana Khattab, Egyptian taekwondo practitioner
- Mahmud Sheet Khattab, Iraqi polymath and Major General
- Moushira Khattab, Egyptian politician
- Mustafa Khattab, Quranic translator
- Nejib Khattab, Tunisian presenter
- Sabri Khattab, Egyptian footballer playing in Norway
- Tareq Khattab, Jordanian footballer
- Yousef al-Khattab, American leader of Revolution Muslim leader
- Ibn al-Khattab, Saudi-born Chechen military leader
- Abu Khattab al-Tunisi, military leader
- Abdul Hadi Abdul Khattab, Malaysian politician

== Places ==
- Khatab-e Sofla, Maragheh, Iran
- Khotb, Maragheh, Iran
- Khattab, Bojnord, Iran
- Khattab, Shirvan, Iran
- Khaṭāb, called Shahrak-e Qaem, Bojnord, Iran
- Khitab, Hama Governorate, Syria

== Fictional characters ==
- Hassan Abdul-rahman ibn Khottab, a jinni better known as Old Khottabych

== See also ==
- Khattabi, a surname
