= Pisier =

Pisier is a surname. Notable people with the surname include:

- Évelyne Pisier (1941–2017), French writer and political scientist
- Gilles Pisier (born 1950), French mathematician
- Marie-France Pisier (1944–2011), French actress
