= Kouchner (surname) =

Kouchner is a French language surname, cognate to the English language Kushner. Notable people with the name include:

- Bernard Kouchner (1939), French politician and doctor
- Camille Kouchner (1975), French lawyer and professor, daughter of Bernard

== See also ==
- Évelyne Pisier, wife of Bernard Kouchner
