= Alain Finkielkraut =

French philosopher (born 1949)

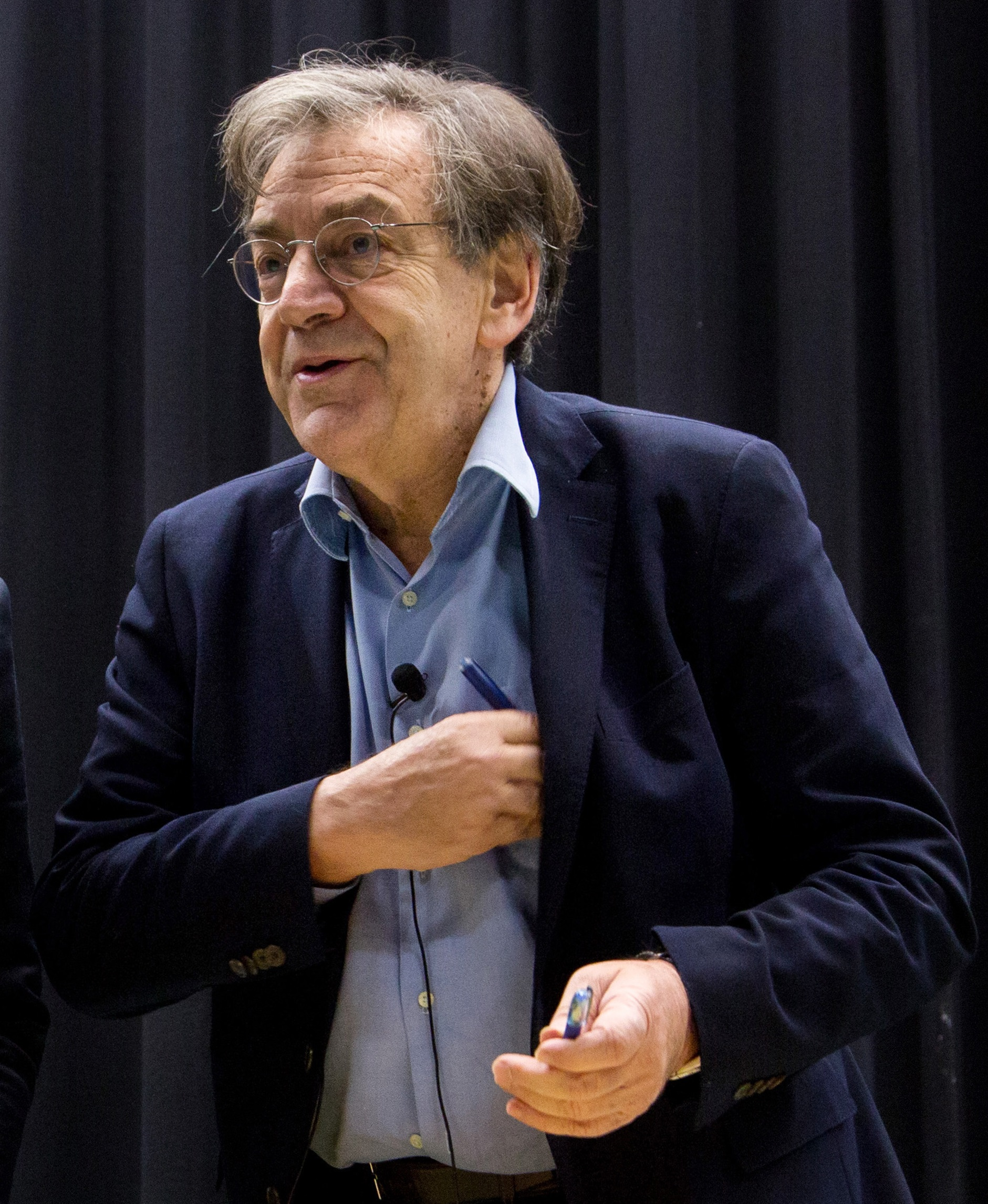
- Finkielkraut in 2014
- Born: 30 June 1949 (age 77); Paris, France
- Citizenship: Stateless (1949–1950); French (1950–present)
- Awards: Officer of the Legion of Honour; Académie française

Education
- Education: École normale supérieure de lettres et sciences humaines

Philosophical work
- Era: 20th-/21st-century philosophy
- Region: Western philosophy
- School: Continental philosophy Nouveaux Philosophes
- Institutions: École Polytechnique; University of California, Berkeley
- Main interests: Modernity, history of ideas, education

Alain Luc Finkielkraut (French: [alɛ̃ finkɛlkʁot]; Yiddish: [fɪŋkiːlˈkʁaʊ̯t]; born 30 June 1949) is a French essayist, radio producer, and public intellectual. Since 1986, he has been the host of Répliques, a talk show broadcast weekly on France Culture. He was elected a Fellow of the Académie Française in 2014.

== Life and career ==
Finkielkraut is the son of a Polish Jewish manufacturer of fine leather goods who survived the Auschwitz concentration camp. Finkielkraut studied modern literature at the École normale supérieure de Saint-Cloud. He joined the Department of French Literature in the University of California, Berkeley as an assistant professor in 1976 and the Department of Humanities and Social Sciences in the École Polytechnique as a professor in 1989.

At the end of the 1990s, Finkielkraut founded with Benny Lévy and Bernard-Henri Lévy an Institute on Levinassian Studies at Jerusalem. In 2010, he was involved in founding JCall, a left-wing advocacy group based in Europe to lobby the European Parliament on foreign policy issues concerning the Middle East and Israel in particular.

== Works ==
Finkielkraut first came to public attention when he and Pascal Bruckner co-authored a number of short but controversial essays intended to question the idea that a new emancipation was underway; these included The New Love Disorder (Le Nouveau Désordre amoureux, 1977) and At the Corner of the Street (Au Coin de la rue, 1978), as well as The Adventure (L'aventure, 1979).

Finkielkraut then began publishing singly authored works on the public's betrayal of memory and our intransigence in the presence of events that, he argued, should move the public. This reflection led Finkielkraut to address post-Holocaust Jewish identity in Europe, such as in The Imaginary Jew (Le Juif imaginaire, 1983). Seeking to promote what he calls a duty of memory, Finkielkraut also published The Future of a Negation: Reflexion on the Genocide Issue (Avenir d'une négation : réflexion sur la question du génocide, 1982) and later his comments on the Klaus Barbie trial, Remembering in Vain (La Mémoire vaine, 1989).

Finkielkraut feels particularly indebted to Emmanuel Levinas. In The Wisdom of Love (La Sagesse de l'amour), Finkielkraut discusses this debt in terms of modernity and its mirages. Finkielkraut continues his reflection on the matter in The Defeat of the Mind (La Défaite de la pensée, 1987) and The Ingratitude: Talks About Our Times (Ingratitude : conversation sur notre temps, 1999). Since the 2000s, Finkielkraut has given his opinion on a variety of topics in society, such as the Internet in The Internet, The Troubling Ecstasy (Internet, l'inquiétante extase, 2001). In the book Present Imperfect (L'Imparfait du présent, 2002), akin to a personal diary, he expresses his thoughts about various events in the world, especially the events of 11 September 2001.

== Opinions and controversies ==
In 1995, Finkielkraut denounced the Cannes Film Festival's jury award, saying: "In recognizing Underground, the Cannes jury thought it was honouring a creator with a thriving imagination. In fact, it has honoured a servile and flashy illustrator of criminal clichés. The Cannes jury ... praised a version of the most hackneyed and deceitful Serb propaganda. The devil himself could not have conceived so cruel an outrage against Bosnia, nor such a grotesque epilogue to Western incompetence and frivolity." It was later revealed that Finkielkraut had not seen the film before writing his criticism.

His interview published in the Haaretz magazine in November 2005, in which he gave his opinion about the 2005 French riots, stirred up much controversy. Finkielkraut's remarked that the France national football team was "black, black, black, which causes sneers all over Europe" (as opposed to the expression "black-blanc-beur"—meaning "Black, White, Arab"—coined after France's win in the 1998 FIFA World Cup final to honour the African and Afro-Caribbean, European, and North African origins of the players), adding that "if you point this out in France, you are thrown in jail". He also denounced African-American Muslims, claiming that there is an "Islamization of the blacks" happening in both America and France. Strong polemics followed the article: MRAP and L'Humanité accused Finkielkraut of racism and many of his colleagues at the École polytechnique published a petition led by Gilles Dowek against what they described as a "colonial project" in his article. Emmanuel Todd wrote in 2008 that "never in France would rioters have been characterized by the color of their skin, if this anti-republican blasphemy had not been the work of an intellectual of Jewish origin, to whom the sacralization of the Shoah guarantees a surer protection than the colonial past to the young people of the suburbs". Finkielkraut later apologized, claiming bad translation of his article by Haaretz.

Israeli filmmaker Eyal Sivan took legal action against Finkielkraut after the Frenchman said Sivan "is, if you will, one of the actors in this particularly painful, particularly alarming reality, the Jewish anti-Semitism that rages today." In 2009, Finkielkraut was criticized for his comment on the Roman Polanski sexual abuse case. Finkielkraut claimed that the 13-years-old victim was a "teenager", "not a child". He was criticized for his close friendship with Croatian president Franjo Tuđman, and was accused by David Bruce MacDonald of supporting "a nation whose leader was a Holocaust revisionist, at the helm of an authoritarian government". In August 2018, Finkielkraut expressed in an interview with The Times of Israel his worries for French Jews and the future of France. He stated: "The anti-Semitism we're now experiencing in France is the worst I've ever seen in my lifetime, and I'm convinced it's going to get worse".

On 16 February 2019, Finkielkraut was accosted on the street by a group of yellow vest protesters in Paris when they chanced on him in Boulevard du Montparnasse. A 36-year-old French convert to Islam was indicted after saying that Finkelkraut was "going to die". Finkelkraut had previously expressed his sympathy for the yellow vest movement. In April 2019, Finkelkraut stated that he had been repeatedly accosted by street protestors and told reporters: "I can no longer show my face on the street." In April 2019, Sciences Po announced the cancellation of a forum where Finkielkraut was to be a speaker due to threats by "antifa" protesters. Eugénie Bastié of Le Figaro denounced the cancellation as a "gangrenous" symptom of the Americanisation of French university life. The announcement was intended to mislead the protesters, and the lecture went on in a different location. In 2022, while appearing on the French TV channel La Chaîne Info, he commented on the Duhamel scandal involving incest committed by Olivier Duhamel on his 14-year old stepson. Finkielkraut speculated that there may have been "consent" between the two parties and claimed that a 14-year-old is "not the same thing" as a "child". Within days, he was summarily fired from the French TV news network for which he was working as a commentator.

In an October 2023 interview following the October 7 attacks, Finkielkraut called European politicians "naive" if they believed that Hamas did not have the complete destruction of Israel and its residents as a goal. In the same interview, however, he also criticised Israel's settlement policy, which "dismantles Israel", "harms the Palestinians" and enabled the Hamas attack in the first place. He called a territorial compromise and a two-state solution between Israelis and Palestinians as the most sensible solution, but one that is very far away. In a January 2024 interview during the Gaza war, he called "wokeism" a "death cult", and antisemitism "the highest level of wokeism". Der Bund wrote in a November 2024 article that Finkielkraut is sometimes described as a Zionist, yet is also at the same a harsh critic of Benjamin Netanyahu. He explained that none of his critics wanted to hear his position, as it was only about "denying Israel's right to exist". But he also stated that Netanyahu was waging a "war without a goal" and that parts of his government wanted "ethnic cleansing" which is why Israel needed "a new government quickly".

== Bibliography ==
- The Religion of Humanity and the Sin of the Jews, essay in Azure magazine.
- Reflections on the Coming Anti-Semitism, essay in Azure magazine.
- Ralentir, mots-valises !, Seuil (1979)
- Le nouveau désordre amoureux, Seuil (1977)
- Au coin de la rue, l'aventure, Seuil (1979)
- Petit fictionnaire illustré : les mots qui manquent au dico, Seuil (1981)
- Le Juif imaginaire, Seuil (1981), Translated to English by Kevin O'Neill & David Suchoff as The imaginary Jew, Lincoln 1994
- L'avenir d'une négation, Seuil (1982), Translated to English by Mary Byrd Kelly as The future of a negation, Lincoln 1998
- La Réprobation d'Israël, Gonthier/Denoël, (1983)
- La sagesse de l'amour, Gallimard (1984)
- La défaite de la pensée, Gallimard (1987), Translated to English by Judith Friedlander as The defeat of the mind, New York 1995
- La mémoire vaine, du Crime contre l'humanité, Gallimard (1989), Translated to English by Roxanne Lapidus and Sima Godfrey as Remembering in vain, New York 1992
- Comment peut-on être Croate ?, Gallimard (1992)
- L'humanité perdue, Seuil (1996), Translated to English by Judith Friedlander as In the name of humanity, London 2001
- Le mécontemporain. Charles Péguy, lecteur du monde moderne, Gallimard (1992)
- L'ingratitude. Conversation sur notre temps avec Antoine Robitaille, Gallimard (1999)
- Une voix vient de l'autre rive, Gallimard (2000)
- Internet, l'inquiétante extase, Mille et une nuits (2001)
- Penser le XXe siècle, École Polytechnique (2000)
- Des hommes et des bêtes, Tricorne (2000)
- L'imparfait du présent. Pièces brèves, Gallimard (2002)
- Enseigner les lettres aujourd'hui, Tricorne (2003)
- Les battements du monde, Pauvert (2003)
- Au nom de l'Autre. Réflexions sur l'antisémitisme qui vient, Gallimard (2003)
- Nous autres, modernes : quatre leçons, Ellipses (2005)
- Ce que peut la littérature, Stock (2006)
- Entretiens sur la laïcité, Verdier (2006)
- Qu'est-ce que la France, Stock (2007)
- La querelle de l'école, Stock (2007)
- Philosophie et modernité, École Polytechnique (2008)
- Un cœur intelligent, Stock/Flammarion (2009)
- « Pour une décence commune » in Regards sur la crise. Réflexions pour comprendre la crise… et en sortir, essay contributed to a collective work edited by Antoine Mercier, Paris, Éditions Hermann, 2010.
- L'explication, conversation avec Aude Lancelin, with Alain Badiou, Nouvelles Éditions Lignes, 2010.
- L'interminable écriture de l'Extermination, with Finkielkraut's direction, transcriptions of TV appearances on Répliques de France Culture, Stock, 2010.
- Et si l'amour durait, Stock, 2011
- L'identité malheureuse, Stock, 2013
- La Seule Exactitude, Stock, 2015
- En terrain miné, with Élisabeth de Fontenay, Stock, 2017
- À la première personne, Gallimard, 2019
- L'après littérature, Stock, 2021
