= The Brontë Sisters =

1979 film by André Téchiné

- Theatrical release poster
- French: Les Sœurs Brontë
- Directed by: André Téchiné
- Written by: André Téchiné; Pascal Bonitzer; Jean Gruault (Note: Participation)
- Produced by: Yves Gasser; Yves Peyrot; Klaus Hellwig
- Starring: Isabelle Adjani; Marie-France Pisier; Isabelle Huppert; Pascal Greggory; Hélène Surgère; Roland Bertin; Alice Sapritch; Xavier Depraz; Patrick Magee
- Cinematography: Bruno Nuytten
- Edited by: Claudine Merlin
- Music by: Philippe Sarde
- Production companies: Action Films; Gaumont; FR3
- Distributed by: Gaumont Distribution
- Release date: 9 May 1979 (France)
- Running time: 115 minutes
- Country: France
- Language: French

The Brontë Sisters (French: Les Sœurs Brontë) is a 1979 French biographical drama film directed by André Téchiné, who co-wrote the screenplay with Pascal Bonitzer and Jean Gruault. The film stars Isabelle Adjani as Emily, Marie-France Pisier as Charlotte and Isabelle Huppert as Anne. Pascal Greggory plays their brother Branwell Brontë. The cinematography was by Bruno Nuytten. It was a project that Téchiné wanted to make since 1972, but only after the favourable reception of Souvenirs d'en France (1975) and Barocco (1976), he was able to find the necessary financing. Produced by Gaumont, the film's originally running time was cut from three hours to less than two upon its release at the 1979 Cannes Film Festival.

Set in a careful recreation of the period, the film follows the bleak lives of the four Brontë siblings in less than a ten-year span. It begins in 1834, when, at the age of seventeen, Branwell painted the famous portrait of his three sisters, in which he originally included his own image, and ends around 1852 when Charlotte, now a famous author, is the only surviving sibling.

== Plot ==
Four young siblings, Charlotte, Branwell, Emily and Anne, live a stoic existence in a small village in the Yorkshire countryside of England. Their old father, who is a Church of England clergyman, a rigid spinster aunt and Tabby, the maid, complete their household. The siblings have artistic ambitions and rely upon each other for companionship. Branwell is a painter and a self-portrait with his sisters is worthy of the general admiration of the family. He wants to pursue a professional career, but only goes as far as to establish a friendship with Leyland, a sculptor. Emily's favourite pastime is to walk across the bleak moors that surround the village dressed as a man. Anne, the youngest of the siblings, is her companion. Charlotte, more ambitious than the others, convinces their reluctant aunt to give her money to go to Belgium in order to study French. Her idea is to eventually come back and open a school. With their aunt's money and permission, Charlotte and Emily go to Brussels. Once there, Charlotte falls secretly in love with her teacher Monsieur Heger, who is already married. Emily plays the piano at school, but has a hard time there and is teased by her classmates for being English and Protestant in a Catholic country. Meanwhile, in England, Anne finds employment as a governess, taking over the education of the daughter of a wealthy family.

While his sisters are away, Branwell deals alone with the death of their aunt. Her death causes Emily and Charlotte to come back home. Emily is relieved and helps Branwell to find solace, taking him to the Black Bull Inn, the tavern and hotel of the town. Charlotte, on the other hand, lovesick, returns as soon as possible to Brussels to be reunited with Monsieur Heger, but her love is unrequited. Thanks to Anne, the aimless dreamer Branwell finds a steady job as the teacher of Edmund, the young son of the Robinson family, Anne's wealthy employers. Mr Robinson is strict, and, with his air of superiority, humiliates both Anne and Branwell. Mrs Robinson, flirty and unsatisfied, starts an ill-fated affair with Branwell. When Anne finds out about their relationship, she quits her job and returns home. Both Branwell and Charlotte have to deal with their broken hearts. After the death of her husband, Mrs Robinson sends Branwell a letter ending their affair.

Branwell's life takes a dark turn. He gives himself over to drinking and becomes addicted to opium. During a windy night, a fire starts in his bedroom and he has to be rescued from amongst the flames by his sisters. Sneaking into Emily's bedroom and searching amongst her things, Charlotte discovers Emily's poems. Deeply impressed, she finally is able to convince the reluctant Emily to have them published. Soon the three sisters have their poems, and later a novel each, published. Reviews of Emily's novel, Wuthering Heights, are particularly harsh. However, the novels of Currer, Ellis and Acton Bell, the pen names adopted by the three sisters, are the talk of London literary circles. Speculations about the sex and identity of the Bells force Charlotte and Anne to go to London to introduce themselves to George Smith, Charlotte's publisher.

Unaware of his sisters literary accomplishments, Branwell dies of marasmus exacerbated by heavy drinking. Emily, stricken by tuberculosis, refuses all medical treatment, insisting on carrying on with her household chores. When she finally agrees to send for a doctor, it is too late, and she dies. Anne is also terminally ill with tuberculosis. Following her wishes, Charlotte takes her to see the sea for the first time, and Anne dies during that trip.

Charlotte is the only survivor among the four siblings. Left alone with her elderly father, she pursues her literary career and begins a romantic relationship with Arthur Nicholls, her father's curate. In the company of Mr. Nicholls and her publisher, Mr Smith, Charlotte goes to the opera in London and meets the famous author William Thackeray.

== Cast ==
- Isabelle Adjani as Emily Brontë
- Marie-France Pisier as Charlotte Brontë
- Isabelle Huppert as Anne Brontë
- Pascal Greggory as Branwell Brontë
- Patrick Magee as Reverend Brontë
- Hélène Surgère as Mrs. Robinson
- Roland Bertin as Mr. Nicholls
- Alice Sapritch as Aunt Elizabeth
- Xavier Depraz as Monsieur Héger
- Adrian Brine as Mr. Robinson
- Julian Curry as Mr. Smith
- Rennee Goddard as Tabby, the maid
- Jean Sorel as Leyland
- Roland Barthes as William Makepeace Thackeray

== Background ==
Since the silent era, Charlotte Brontë's Jane Eyre and Emily's Wuthering Heights have been adapted in to film multiple times. The most famous adaptations were director William Wyler's Wuthering Heights in 1939, (a film starring Laurence Olivier, Merle Oberon and David Niven) and Jane Eyre, a film starring Orson Welles and Joan Fontaine under the direction of Robert Stevenson in 1943.

The lives of the three Brontë sisters did not attract the same level of interest in Hollywood, even though biographies and semi-fictional books based on the lives has been published. The only Hollywood production made about the Brontës was Devotion, a film directed by Curtis Bernhardt in 1946 that had tried to capitalise on the success of Jane Eyre two years earlier. Starring Ida Lupino as Emily, Olivia de Havilland as Charlotte, Nancy Coleman as Anne and Arthur Kennedy as Branwell, Devotion made no effort at historical accuracy. It portrays Emily as being in love with reverend Nichols who is in love with Charlotte. The film, made as potboiler romance, had no resemblance to the actual lives of the Brontë sisters and was decried by Brontë enthusiasts for its blatant inaccuracies.

The Brontës of Haworth, a four-part drama made for Yorkshire television, was broadcast in 1973 with a script written by Christopher Fry; directed and produced by Marc Miller. Emily was played by Rosemary McHale, Charlotte by Vickery Turner, Anne by Ann Penfold and Branwell by Michael Kitchen. Shot on authentic locations, The Brontës of Haworth was very well received.

Téchiné biopic on the Brontë, conceived in the early 1970s, was only the third project on the famous authors lives and the first accurate portrayal of them to be made on film.

Only one production has taken the story of the Brontë family since then, To Walk Invisible, a British television film first aired on BBC on 29 December 2016. Written and directed by Sally Wainwright, it focused on the eventful (1846-1848) period during which the four Bronte sibling were back at the parsonage. While the three sisters became published authors, their brother fell in a spiral of self-destruction. To Walk Invisible cast was headed by Finn Atkins as Charlotte, Charlie Murphy as Anne, Chloe Pirrie as Emily, Adam Nagaitis as Branwell and Jonathan Pryce as their father, Patrick Brontë.

== Production ==
The film is notable for casting three of France's most famous actresses of the time: Isabelle Adjani as Emily, Marie-France Pisier as Charlotte and Isabelle Huppert as Anne. Marie-France Pisier, known for her work in the films of François Truffaut, had won back to back César Awards as best supporting actress in Téchiné’s two previous films Souvenirs d’en France and Barocco. She had developed a friendship with Téchiné while working for him. From the cast of Barocco also came Adjani, who was the female lead in that film. Isabelle Adjani had come to international attention under the direction Truffaut in The Story of Adele H, playing the mentally disturbed daughter of Victor Hugo. She and the cinematographer Bruno Nuytten, who had photographed Barocco, were then a couple and she gave birth to their son around the time of the film’s released. Nuytten famously went to direct Adjani in Camille Claudel, an artistic success for both.

Pascal Greggory was an unknown actor with only few minor acting credits in films, but he was chosen above Alain Delon and Patrick Dewaere for the role of Branwell. He went on to play Adjani’s brother in La Reine Margot (1994) in which he had the role of Henri III. Huppert, Adjani and Greggory were only in their mid-twenties when the film was made.

Isabelle Huppert had risen to prominence in The Lacemaker (French: La Dentellière) (1977). One of her earlier roles had been in Liliane de Kermadec's Aloïse, a film written by Téchiné. The prior year she played the real-life criminal Violette Nozière in Claude Charbol's movie which won her the Cannes Film Festival Of Best Actress. Huppert and Adjani famously did not get along which made the production of The Brontë Sisters difficult.

Patrick Magee, a veteran Irish actor known for his work in two Stanley Kubrick's films, A Clockwork Orange and Barry Lyndon, took the role of the father. He spoke his lines in English and was dubbed into French.

Filming took place in Yorkshire, England between 3 July and September 1978.

== Music ==
The music for the film was arranged by Philippe Sarde, a brother of Alain Sarde, who had produced Téchiné's two previous films and was executive producer of The Brontë Sisters. Philippe Sarde had written original music for Souvenirs d’en France and Barocco, but in The Brontë Sisters he arranged adaptions of classical pieces on place of an original score. Gioachino Rossini overture to Tancredi and music from Robert Schumann, where among the compositions used following the mold of Stanley Kubrick reused of classical music in his films.

== Reception ==
The film was ill-received at its premiere at the Cannes Film Festival in May 1979, where Francis Ford Coppola's Apocalypse Now eclipsed other films in competition. However, The Brontë Sisters's reputation has grown since then. Today it is seen as an accurate representation of the lonely and bleak lives of the Brontë siblings.

== Home media ==
The Brontë Sisters was remastered and re-released as part of the Cohen Film Collection by the Cohen Media Group. It came out on DVD and Blu-ray on July 30, 2013.

Both editions include an audio commentary with film critic Wade Major and Brontë scholar Sue Lonoff de Cuevas. They also include Dominique Maillet's 2012 The Ghosts of Haworth, an hour-long documentary on the conception, making, and reception of the film through interviews with Téchiné, co-writer Pascal Bonitzer, Brontë-scholar Claire Bazin, costumier Christian Gasc, and actor Pascal Gregory. Two theatrical trailers, one for the original 1979 French release and one from the recent theatrical re-release complete the extra features.

Previously to 2013, the film had been released on DVD only in region 2. It was released in Spain in French with Spanish subtitles or dubbed in Spanish as the options offered, but it is currently out of print. The film was released on DVD in Sweden in 2009 as part of a box set of Brontë-related films.

Gaumont released a Region B Blu-ray in France on 9 May 2012.

== See also ==
- Isabelle Huppert on screen and stage
- Emily (2022 film)
