= Camille Kouchner =

French scholar (born 1975)

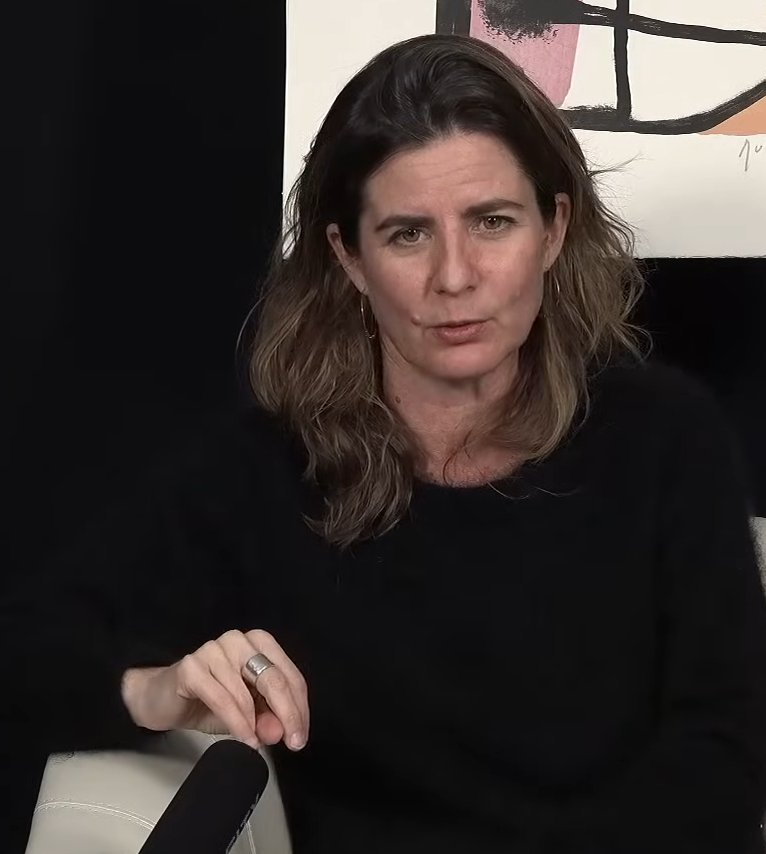
- Born: 18 June 1975 (age 51); Paris, France
- Education: Lycée Henri-IV
- Alma mater: Paris 2 Panthéon-Assas University
- Occupation: Lawyer
- Known for: Duhamel scandal
- Parent(s): Bernard Kouchner; Évelyne Pisier

Camille Kouchner (born 18 June 1975 in Paris), is a lawyer, French academic and lecturer in private law. With her book, La familia grande, she initiated the Duhamel scandal.

== Biography ==
Camille Kouchner was born on June 17, 1975, daughter of the doctor and politician Bernard Kouchner and the writer and political scientist Évelyne Pisier. She is the niece of the mathematician Gilles Pisier and of the actress and novelist Marie-France Pisier.

Following the divorce of her parents in 1984, she was partially brought up by her mother’s second husband, the political scientist Olivier Duhamel. She has two brothers, including a twin, as well as a half-sister and a half-brother adopted by her mother and Duhamel.

At the beginning of January 2021, in her book La Familia grande, Camille Kouchner accused her stepfather—Duhamel—of incest, rape and sexual assault "repeated for years": she wrote that, from 1988 to 1989, her stepfather regularly abused her twin brother (renamed Victor in the book) during his adolescence.
