= Duhamel scandal =

Sexual abuse scandal

The Duhamel scandal was a 2021 scandal involving a leading Parisian social and political sciences university, Sciences Po. The scandal originated from accusations in a book written by Camille Kouchner, La Familia Grande. In that book, Kouchner, daughter of former minister Bernard Kouchner, accused Olivier Duhamel, her step-father, of sexually abusing her twin brother Antoine. The resulting outrage resulted in multiple resignations from the school and in Duhamel's confession. The public questioned Sciences Po's handling of the alleged activity, but the school was ultimately exonerated.

== History and scandal ==
Olivier Duhamel, a revered professor and politician, was also president of the Fondation Nationale des Sciences Politiques (FNSP) which oversees and finances Sciences Po. After the sexual abuse allegations Duhamel resigned from his job at the FNSP, as host of a popular radio programme on Europe 1, and deleted his Twitter account.

In her book, Camille Kouchner explains that dozens of her mother's intellectual friends knew about the abuse but chose to keep quiet. French news magazine L'Obs reported that Duhamel also organized events with the French intelligentsia involving adults and children partaking in sexual acts and alcohol consumption. In La Familia Grande, Kouchner depicts the environment in which such events took place, and how the intelligentsia justified them intellectually. Nudity among children and adults was encouraged. Duhamel took photos of children and adults and hung them in large format on the walls. According to a witness who talked to L'Obs but whose identity has not been revealed, children were told about sex and then asked to mime sexual acts in front of their parents. Twelve-year-old girls were dressed in provocative clothes and makeup, and sent to dance with 40-year-old men. Older children were asked to tell the audience about their first sexual experiences. Young boys were "offered" to older women. All of these acts were "brushed aside and silenced based on 1970s hedonism and complex parents-children relations."

The abuse of Camille's brother allegedly started in 1989 when he was fourteen years old. He confided in his sister Camille but swore her to secrecy. By 2008, as a 33 year old father, he refused to allow his children to spend holidays with his mother, Évelyne Pisier and Duhamel. He revealed the sexual abuse to his mother when she questioned this, and then later to his aunt Marie-France Pisier. Évelyne, a professor at Sciences Po, allegedly believed the story but sided with her husband. Marie-France Pisier, on the other hand, took great offence at the abuse and her sister's inaction. In 2011, Marie-France Pisier was found dead in her swimming pool. The death was ruled a suicide, and a link to the above-mentioned scandal was found to be unclear. Évelyne Pisier died in 2017.

Bernard Kouchner learned about the abuse in the 2010s and wanted to physically assault Duhamel, but Camille prevented him. Bernard went on to applaud his children's courage and honesty.

== Aftermath ==
The scandal was compared to a "bomb" launched on Sciences Po and to an "unpinned grenade thrown at Sciences Po". Olivier Duhamel, director of the National Foundation of Sciences Po, Frédéric Mion, director of Sciences Po, and other members of the board of these institutions resigned. It led to other scandals and a succession crisis. The hashtag #SciencesPorcs was also created. While the book and media coverage questioned Sciences Po's responsibility in covering up sexual abuse and paedophilia, the school was exonerated of the allegations.

Camille Kouchner's book sparked a wave of reactions on Twitter under the hashtag #MetooIncest and #MeTooGay. An investigation concerning Duhamel was opened by Paris prosecutors in January 2021 about "rape and sexual aggression against a minor". The scandal broke a national taboo on the abuse of minors and accelerated the advent of new child protection laws.

In April 2021, Duhamel confessed to sexually abusing his stepson. On June 14, 2021, French police announced they would drop the investigation into charges of sexual aggression against and rape of a minor because the statute of limitations had expired. They said that, had this not been the case, the facts revealed in their investigation would have led to a prosecution.
