= François Laval =

French scholar of law

François Laval (born 1967) is a French scholar of law and political science, specialised in French constitutional law and European politics. He has been the Director of the Nancy Campus of Sciences Po (the Paris Institute of Political Studies), since 2004.

== Early life and education ==
He studied public law and political science at Nancy II University, graduating with a Master of Advanced Studies (DEA) in 1985. He then pursued his studies in Paris at Sciences Po, completing a Master of Public Policy.

== Career ==
Following the completion of his studies, Laval returned to Nancy to work in local politics and from 2002 was responsible for higher education and research in the city. A task he pursued as Director of the Nancy Campus, developing institutional partnerships with a diversity of actors, including the University of Lorraine, the Government of Saarland and the Franco-German Youth Office.

In 2004, he succeeded Laurent Bigorgne as Director of the Nancy Campus of Sciences Po, appointed by Richard Descoings.

Laval regularly coordinates and leads Franco-German initiatives on behalf of the city of Nancy, including the 2009 and 2019 commemorations of the fall of the Berlin Wall.

During the MeToo movement and the succession of sexual abuse and harassment scandals involving Sciences Po, Laval highlighted the need to "distinguish individual behaviour from the functioning of an institution", explaining that the Duhamel scandal and the accusations against his predecessor Laurent Bigorgne do not reflect on the character of the university as a whole.

Laval regularly intervenes in public media on political issues, notably during elections. Although he has rarely expressed openly his political opinions, he has declared his opposition to the use of university blockades by protest movements and his solidarity with Ukraine during the 2022 Russian Invasion of Ukraine, criticising Russian President Vladimir Putin for his "abuse of power" in Russia and the imprisonment and assassination of his political opponents, citing the example of Alexei Navalny. He has also frequently expressed his support for the European project.

Laval has supported moves to reform the French higher education system and has criticised the lack of student autonomy in French university culture, stating that education must be based on the discovery of oneself as well as the acquisition of knowledge. He has been a notable advocate of the Humboldtian model of higher education.

== Personal life ==
Laval lives in Nancy, France, and is married with children.

He has declared Carpe Diem to be his personal motto and is known to organise a screening of Dead Poets Society for his new students at the beginning of each academic year.
