= Hindi Rusi Bhai Bhai =

1950s–1980s Soviet political slogan

This composite flag, incorporating the Indian tricolor and the Russian double-headed eagle, symbolizes the shared cultural heritage and brotherhood of the Russian-Indian community and people of Indian origin in Russia.

Hindi Rusi Bhai Bhai (Hindi: हिन्दी रूसी भाई भाई — "Indians and Russians are brothers") was a political slogan used in India from the 1950s to the 1980s that was officially advocated in India and the Soviet Union. It was declared by Nikita Khrushchev at a meeting in Bangalore on November 26, 1955.

== History ==
The term came from a similar slogan, "Hindi Chini Bhai Bhai" (Hindi: हिन्दी चीनी भाई भाई) declaring brotherhood between the nascent republican India and China between 1954—1962, under the "Five Principles of Peaceful Coexistence, or "pancha shila", ultimately ending with the Sino-Indian War of 1962. Similarly, in the USSR, the slogan "Russians and Chinese are brothers forever", derived from the song Moscow-Peking was seen, a sentiment that ended with the Sino-Soviet split.

The slogan was used in Soviet literature, for example, in the book "Old Man Hottabych" by Lazar Lagin and in the corresponding movie. It also appears prominently in the film "Be prepared, Your Majesty" by Lev Kassil. The usage also continued after the Soviet Union's collapse, such as in the 1991 movie Promised Heaven by Eldar Ryazanov.

The word bhai in Hindi means "brother" and etymologically corresponds to Russian word брат ("brat"). There are also cognates in other Indo-European languages: brother in English, frāter in Latin, φράτηρ in Greek.
