= Lagin =

Lagin may refer to:

- Leinster, Irish province
- The Laigin, the population group from which Leinster took its name
- Lazar Lagin
- Ned Lagin, an American artist, photographer, scientist, composer, and keyboardist
