= The Twelve Months =

Twelve months is equal to one year.

The Twelve Months or Twelve Months may also refer to:

- The Twelve Months (fairy tale)
- The Twelve Months (1956 film), a Soviet traditionally animated feature film
- The Twelve Months (1972 film), a Soviet Lenfilm fantasy film
- Twelve Months (1980 film), an animated feature film
- Twelve Months, the 18th The Dresden Files novel
