= Hasan (hadith) =

Hasan (حَسَن Ḥasan, meaning "good") is an Arabic language word. It is used in Hadith evaluation, meaning roughly "good." The word is used to describe hadith whose authenticity is not as well-established as that of ṣaḥīḥ hadith, but sufficient for use as supporting evidence.

== Evaluation ==
Ibn Hajar defines a hadith that is ḥasan lidhatihi – "ḥasan in and of itself" – with the same definition a ṣaḥīḥ hadith except that the competence of one of its narrators is less than complete; while a hadith that is ḥasan lighairihi ("ḥasan due to external factors") is determined to be ḥasan due to corroborating factors such as numerous chains of narration. He states that it is then comparable to a ṣaḥīḥ hadith in its religious authority. Hasan hadīth is transmitted through an unbroken chain of narrators all of whom are of sound character but weak memory. A ḥasan hadith may rise to the level of being ṣaḥīḥ if it is supported by numerous isnād (chains of narration); in this case that hadith would be ḥasan lidhatihi ("ḥasan in and of itself") but, once coupled with other supporting chains, becomes ṣaḥīḥ lighairihi ("ṣaḥīḥ due to external factors").

al-Tirmidhi defined Hasan as a Hadith which does not contain a reporter accused of lying and it is not Shadh (rare) and the Hadith has been reported through more than one Sanad.

Khattabi (d. 388 A.H.), a commentator on Sunan Abu Dawud, defined Hasan:

"It refers to a Hadith which is known, its reporters are famous, the majority of the scholars have accepted it as evidence and the jurists utilize it."

Thus, there is a difference in definition between al-Tirmidhi and others. Tirmidhi requires several chains of transmitters, while according to the majority, a tradition with a single chain can also be classified as Hasan.

Mohammad Hashim Kamali says, Hasan hadīth may be elevated to the level of Şahīh if it is endorsed by another hadīth with a stronger isnād.
