= Frédérique Matonti =

French political scientist

- Education: École normale supérieure de jeunes filles; University of Paris 1 Pantheon-Sorbonne
- Awards: Chevalier, Legion of Honor
- Scientific career
- Fields: Political science
- Workplaces: École Normale Supérieure; Université Sorbonne Paris Nord; University of Nantes; University of Paris 1 Pantheon-Sorbonne
- Doctoral advisor: Évelyne Pisier

Frédérique Matonti (born August 29, 1958) is a French political scientist. She is a professor at the University of Paris 1 Pantheon-Sorbonne. She is an expert in the history of political philosophy, political parties, and gender studies.

== Career ==
Matonti attended the École normale supérieure de jeunes filles in Sèvres, from 1978 to 1983. She then completed an Agrégée in philosophy (fr) in 1985. In 1996, she graduated from the University of Paris 1 Pantheon-Sorbonne with a doctorate in political science. Her thesis was entitled La Double illusion. "La Nouvelle Critique", une revue du pcf (1967-1980), and was conducted under the supervision of Évelyne Pisier. In 1999, she earned an Agrégée in political science (fr).

After completing her doctoral degree, Matonti taught at the École Normale Supérieure, the Université Sorbonne Paris Nord, The University of Nantes, and The University of Paris 1 Pantheon-Sorbonne.

Matonti studies the formation and sociology of political parties, gender studies, and the history of ideas in political philosophy. She devoted her doctoral research to the Nouvelle Critique (fr), which was the intellectual journal of the French Communist Party from 1948 until 1980. Specifically, she studied the way that the intellectuals' obedience to the party manifested in and was encouraged by the journal. She participated in the collective enterprise of "La Misère du monde" as part of her research on the National Rally, wrote a biography of the revolutionary Marie-Jean Hérault de Séchelles, and worked on the political professionalization of women.

In 2017, she was named a Chevalier of the Legion of Honor.

Matonti's work has been cited, or she has been interviewed, in news outlets like Le Monde, L'Est Républicain, CNN, Libération, France Culture, Le Parisien, and RFI.

== Selected works ==
- Le comportement politique des Français, Colin (1998)
- Hérault de Séchelles ou Les infortunes de la beauté, La Dispute (1998)
- La démobilisation politique, La Dispute (2005)
- Intellectuels communistes : essai sur l'obéissance politique, La Nouvelle Critique, La Découverte (2005)
- Mai-juin 1968, Editions de l'Atelier/Éditions ouvrières, with Dominique Damamme, Boris Gobille and Bernard Pudal (fr) (2008)
- Sexes, genre et politique, Économica, with Catherine Achin, Lucie Bargel, Delphine Dulong, et al. (2007)

== Selected awards ==
- Chevalier, Legion of Honor.
