= Bruno Nuytten =

French cinematographer turned director (born 1945)

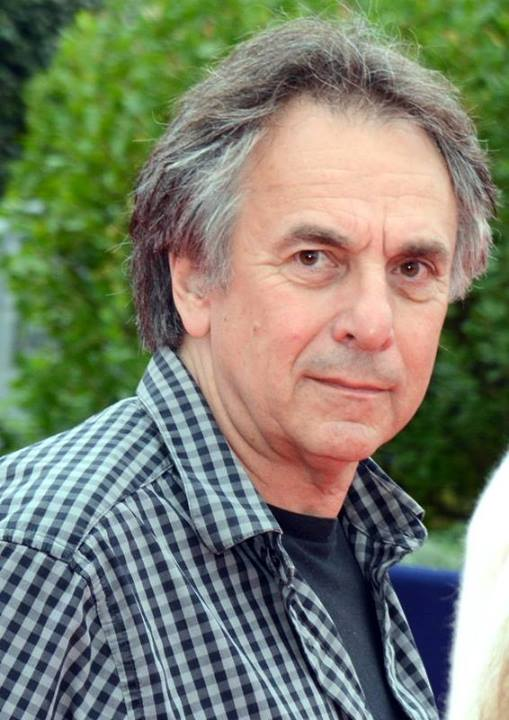
- Nuytten in 2013
- Born: 28 August 1945 (age 81); Melun, Seine-et-Marne, Île-de-France, France
- Spouse: Tatiana Vialle (m. 1996)
- Partner(s): Isabelle Adjani (1976–1981)
- Children: 3
- Awards: BAFTA Award for Best Cinematography; 1987 Jean de Florette; César Award for Best Cinematography; 1976 Barocco; La meilleure façon de marcher 1983 Tchao pantin César Award for Best Film; 1988 Camille Claudel

Bruno Nuytten (born 28 August 1945) is a French cinematographer turned director.

Camille Claudel, which was Nuytten's first directorial and screenwriting effort, won the César Award for Best film in 1989. The film starred and was co-produced by Isabelle Adjani, with whom he had a son, Barnabé Saïd-Nuytten. Adjani won the Silver Bear for Best Actress at the 39th Berlin International Film Festival for her role in the film.

His sophomore directorial effort, Albert Souffre, though also a heavily emotional movie, was set in contemporary times.

His 2000 film, Passionnément, starred Charlotte Gainsbourg.

His films as cinematographer include Les Valseuses, Barocco, La meilleure façon de marcher, The Bronte Sisters, Brubaker, Garde à vue, Possession, Fort Saganne, So Long, Stooge (Tchao Pantin), Jean de Florette and Manon des Sources (US title: Manon of the Spring). He won the César Award for Best Cinematography in 1977 and 1984, and was nominated in 1980, 1982, 1985 and 1987.

He is a professor at France's national film school La Fémis.

== Biography ==
In his adolescence, Bruno Nuytten played in an amateur theatre troupe. His education is varied. He wanted to be a cartoonist and prepared for the competitive entrance examination to the École nationale supérieure des arts décoratifs, but he failed it. He also prepared to study at France's most prominent film school, the Institut des hautes études cinématographiques (IDHEC), but failed the entrance examination. He also considered attending the Łódź Film School in Poland, but was deterred by their required Polish language course. He instead gained admission to the Institut national supérieur des arts du spectacle et des techniques de diffusion (INSAS, Belgium, 1967-1969). He left early without finishing his degree so that he could instead obtain a BTS to be able to work in France. He began by being assistant to Ghislain Cloquet (who had been his professor at INSAS), then to Claude Lecomte and to Ricardo Aronovitch. He first worked on short films, then launched himself into the roles of cinematographer and director of photography. He seeks contrasting images, a moving camera, an active relationship with space. By listening to the directors, he learned how to use fixed shots and lighting without contrast when requested by Marguerite Duras (La Femme du Gange (1974), India Song (1975), Son nom de Venise (1976)), or an exaggeratedly expressionist style and a shoulder camera with Andrzej Zulawski (Possession, 1981).

Bruno Nuytten went into directing for Camille Claudel, at the express request of actress Isabelle Adjani, who co-produced the film (with Christian Fechner) and took the leading role. In 2013, she said: “His reason to be, it was the shadow. From the shadow, he made the light exist. He had told me that he would never go into directing. [...] I told him that I would like to use the body of Camille Claudel to be able to personify my own disarray, my cry. He heard me.” A few years earlier, Nuytten had remarked: “The only interesting thing that I discovered while talking with a journalist is that in fact I had put myself in scene in the inversion of powers: at the end of the film I had become Camille Claudel and Isabelle Adjani had become Rodin. And there I am more and more Camille Claudel, even if I am not still in the asylum! One never escapes the delicate, fragile, and human things one touches…”

In 2015, Caroline Champetier, also director of photography, devoted the documentary Nuytten/Film to him.

Bruno Nuytten wrote articles for the technical review Le cinema pratique, animated conferences at the Ciné-club de Melun, and lectures at the Université de Paris III. In Switzerland, he founded a production company for advertising films.

Bruno Nuytten was the companion of Isabelle Adjani, with whom he had a son, Barnabé, in 1979. Since 1996, he has lived with the director Tatiana Vialle, with whom he has had two children, Tobias and Galathée. He is the stepfather of actor Swann Arlaud.

== Filmography ==
=== As a director ===
- 1988: Camille Claudel
- 1992: Albert Souffre
- 2000: Passionnément
- 2002: Jim, la nuit

=== As a cinematographer ===
- 1969: L'Espace vital by Patrice Leconte - short film
- 1971: Les Machins de l'existence by Jean-François Dion - short film
- 1971: La Poule de Luc Béraud - short film
- 1972: Tristan et Iseult by Yvan Lagrange
- 1974: Les Valseuses by Bertrand Blier
- 1974: Le Jeu des preuves by Luc Béraud - short film
- 1974: La Femme du Gange by Marguerite Duras
- 1975: L'Assassin musicien by Benoît Jacquot
- 1975: India Song by Marguerite Duras
- 1975: Souvenirs d'en France by André Téchiné
- 1976: Les Vécés étaient fermés de l'intérieur by Patrice Leconte
- 1976: La meilleure façon de marcher by Claude Miller
- 1976: Mon cœur est rouge by Michèle Rosier
- 1976: Barocco by André Téchiné
- 1976: Son nom de Venise dans Calcutta désert by Marguerite Duras
- 1977: Le Camion by Marguerite Duras
- 1977: La Nuit, tous les chats sont gris by Gérard Zingg
- 1978: L'Exercice du pouvoir by Philippe Galland
- 1978: La Tortue sur le dos by Luc Béraud
- 1979: Les Sœurs Brontë by André Téchiné
- 1979: Zoo zéro by Alain Fleischer
- 1979: French Postcards by Willard Huyck
- 1980: Brubaker by Stuart Rosenberg
- 1981: Hôtel des Amériques by André Téchiné
- 1981: Garde à vue by Claude Miller
- 1981: Possession by Andrzej Żuławski
- 1981: Un assassin qui passe by Michel Vianey
- 1982: Invitation au voyage by Peter del Monte
- 1983: Tchao pantin by Claude Berri
- 1983: La Pirate by Jacques Doillon
- 1983: La vie est un roman by Alain Resnais
- 1984: Fort Saganne by Alain Corneau
- 1985: Les Enfants by Marguerite Duras
- 1985: Détective by Jean-Luc Godard
- 1986: Jean de Florette by Claude Berri
- 1986: Manon des sources by Claude Berri
