= Old Khottabych =

Soviet fantasy film

Starik Khottabych
- Original film poster
- Directed by: Gennadi Kazansky; L. Mahtin
- Written by: Lazar Lagin
- Screenplay by: Lazar Lagin
- Based on: Old Khottabych by Lazar Lagin
- Produced by: T. Samoznayeva [Production Director]
- Starring: Nikolay Volkov; Alexey Litvinov; Gennady Khudyakov
- Cinematography: M. Shurukov
- Music by: Nadezhda Simonyan
- Production company: Lenfilm
- Distributed by: Goskino
- Release date: 1956
- Running time: 86 min.
- Country: USSR
- Language: Russian

Starik Khottabych (Russian: Старик Хоттабыч, Old Man Khottabych or Old Khottabych) is a Sovcolor Soviet fantasy film produced in the Soviet Union by Goskino at Kinostudiya Lenfilm (Lenfilm Studio) in 1956, based on a children's fairytale novel with the same title by Lazar Lagin who also wrote the film's script, and directed by Gennadi Kazansky. In the United States, the film was released theatrically by Sovexportfilm, with English subtitles, under the title The Flying Carpet through Artkino Pictures in 1960.

== Plot summary ==
Volka, (Note: Volka (Willie) is a diminutive form of the name Volya which also was a diminutive name of Vladimir: "Yesterday, a pioneer named Vladimir Kostylkov came to his district militia station and handed the officer on duty a treasure consisting of antique gold objects which he found on the bottom of the river, in a very deep place.") a 12-year-old Soviet Young Pioneer, discovers an ancient vessel at the bottom of a river. When he opens it, a genie emerges. He calls himself Hassan Abdurrahman ibn Khottab, but Volka renames him Khottabych. The name Khottabych is derived from the Arabic name Khattab with the Russian patronymic suffix -ych, yielding a Russian equivalent of ibn-Khottab (son of Khottab). Khottabych later claims to be 3,732 years and 5 months old. The grateful Khottabych is ready to fulfill any of Volka's wishes, but it becomes clear that Volka should use the powers of the genie carefully, for they can have some unforeseen undesirable results.

== Cast ==
- Nikolay Volkov as Hassan Abdurrahman ibn Khottab ("Old Khottabych") which is the name of a jinn (kind of non bad spirit)
- Alexey Litvinov as Volka Kostylkov (Volka ibn Alyosha)
- Genya Khudyskov as Zhenya - Volka's friend
- Lyova Kovalychuk as Goga Pilyukin (Goga-Pilyulya ("pill" in Russian) - young boy who verbally spreads news on the street
- Maya Blinova as Volka's Mother
- Vera Romanova as Glafira Kuzminichna - Goga's Mother
- Olga Cherkasova as Varvara Stepanovna - school class leader
- Efim Kopelyan as Emir Mukhammdov : drilling master from Baku (capital of Azerbaijan Republic)
- Aleksandr Larikov as doctor
- Evgeniy Vesnik as militiaman
- Zinaida Sharko as woman who sold ice cream in a circus

== Production personnel ==
- Production director: Tamara Samoznaeva
- Producer: Lev Makhtin
- Screenplay by Lazar Lagin
- Directed by Gennadi Kazansky
- Cinematographer: Muzakir Shuruckov
- Art directors: Isaak Kaplan, Bella Manevich
- Composer: Nadezhda Simonyan
- Sound operator: Grigory Albert

Special effects team:

- Director of photography: Mihail Shamkovich
- Camera operators: B. Durov, M. Pocrovsky
- Art directors: A. Alekseyev, Mihail Krotkin, Maria Kandat

== Production notes ==
The novel is influenced by the tale of Aladdin and his magical lamp, and it was quite popular with Soviet kids. There were two major versions of the novel - the original was published in 1938, and a revised version followed in 1955. This later version was the basis of the 1956 film. Revisions to the novel were made by Lagin himself in order to incorporate the changes taking place in the USSR and the rest of the world into the narrative, including some ideological anti-capitalistic elements. The original edition has been republished in the Post-Soviet era.

== Awards ==
- 1958 Moscow International Film Festival award
- 1958 Vancouver International Film Festival award

== Video ==
Early 1990s - Russkoje Video (VHS)

December 2003 - Russian Cinema Councill (DVD). The disc contains four spoken languages in Dolby Digital 5.1: Russian original, English voice-over, French and Arabic languages; subtitles in Russian, English, French, Spanish, Italian, Dutch, Japanese, Swedish, German, Portuguese, Hebrew, Arabic and Chinese. It also contains special features "Monologue in the Intermission", "Another Genie", filmography and a photo album.

== See also ==
- The Brass Bottle
- Hindi rusi bhai bhai
