= Moushira Khattab =

Egyptian politician and diplomat

Her Excellency Moushira Khattab
- مشــيرة محـمود خطـاب
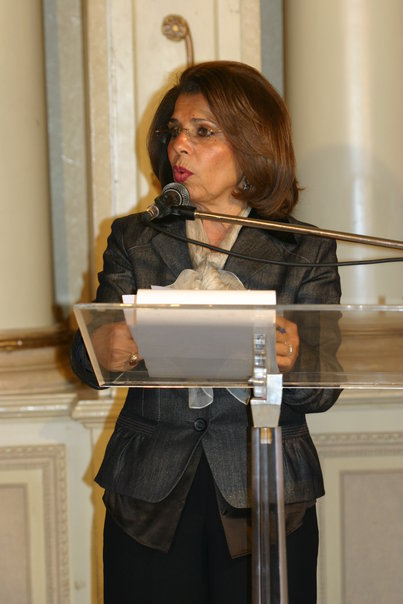

Minister of Family & Population
- In office 2009–2011

Secretary General, National Council for Childhood & Motherhood
- In office 1999–2009

Ambassador of Egypt to South Africa
- In office 1994–1999

Ambassador of Egypt to Czech Republic
- In office 1992–1994

Ambassador of Egypt to Slovakia
- In office 1992–1994

Ambassador of Egypt to Czechoslovakia
- In office 1992–1992

Personal details
- Born: Cairo, Egypt
- Education: Cairo University

Moushira Mahmoud Khattab is an Egyptian politician and diplomat born in 1944. She is serving as the president of the National Council for Human Rights, Egypt's national Human Rights Institution. She previously served as minister of family and population, assistant minister of foreign affairs, Ambassador of Egypt to South Africa, the Czech Republic and Slovakia as well serving in Egypt’s diplomatic missions in Australia, Hungary, Austria and the United Nations in New York City and Vienna. She is also a human rights activist advocating the rights of children and women and the former vice chair and rapporteur of the UN Committee on the Rights of the Child based at the UN Headquarters in Geneva. On 19 July 2016, the Prime Minister of Egypt announced that Moushira Khattab would be Egypt's candidate for the post of UNESCO director-general at the elections due to be held in 2017.

== Education ==
Khattab holds a PhD on the rights of the child from Cairo University, an M.A. in International Relations from the University of North Carolina at Chapel Hill at Chapel Hill, NC, USA, and a B.A. in political science from Cairo University, Faculty of Economics and Political Science.

== Diplomatic career ==
A career diplomat serving as Egypt’s first Ambassador to South Africa and before it she was the Ambassador to Czechoslovakia during its peaceful separation to the Czech Republic and Slovakia, Khattab ended her diplomatic career as assistant minister of foreign affairs for international cultural relations. Khattab also served at Egypt's diplomatic missions in Budapest, Vienna and Melbourne as well as serving at the UN headquarters in New York and UNIDO headquarters in Vienna.

== Ministerial career ==
From March 2009 until February 2011, Khattab served as minister of state for family and population. She holds the position of vice-president of the International Bureau for Children’s Rights “IBCR”. Khattab represents the MENA Region on the Board of Child Helpline International and Chairs both the National Committee and the steering Committee of Middle East & North Africa on Violence against Children. Khattab served as Vice Chair, Rapporteur and member of UN Committee on the Rights of the Child 2002–2010. She is a member in several associations including the Women Leadership Council to combat trafficking in persons including children, UNGIFT- Vienna 2008. She chaired the ad hoc UN intergovernmental expert group that formulated the UN Guidelines on Justice Matters related to children victims and witnesses to crime adopted by ECOSOC in 2005. Khattab is vice president of the Aflatoun Child Savings International based in Amsterdam and is a regular lecturer on children’s rights to police officers, judges, women organizations and the media.

Since 2011, Ambassador Khattab has been a speaker and panelist in key events related to women's rights, children's rights and development as well as other international events.

== Candidature for UNESCO Director-General ==
On 19 July 2016, the Prime Minister of Egypt announced that Khattab would be Egypt's candidate for the post of UNESCO director-general at the elections due to be held in 2017. The announcement was made against the backdrop of The Egyptian Museum to symbolise Egypt's strong culture and rich heritage and also as one of the founding members and earliest partners of UNESCO including the relocation of the Abu Simbel temples in 1964 among many others. Khattab's candidature was endorsed by the African Union at the 27th AU summit held in Kigali from 10–18 July 2016.. However ultimately Khattab's bid to become UNESCO Director General was not successful.

== Honours ==
In 1999, Khattab was awarded the Order of Good Hope by the President of the Republic of South Africa, the highest order which can be awarded to a foreign national.

In 2010, Khattab was awarded Knight Grand Cross of the Italian Republic by the President of Italy. In 2008, she was awarded the International Women of Courage Award by the U.S. State Department. In 2007, she was awarded Commander of the Order of Merit of the Italian Republic.
