= Moscow–Peking =

1949 Soviet mass song

Song
- Language: Russian
- Written: 1949
- Genre: Mass song
- Composer(s): Vano Muradeli
- Lyricist(s): Mikhail Vershinin

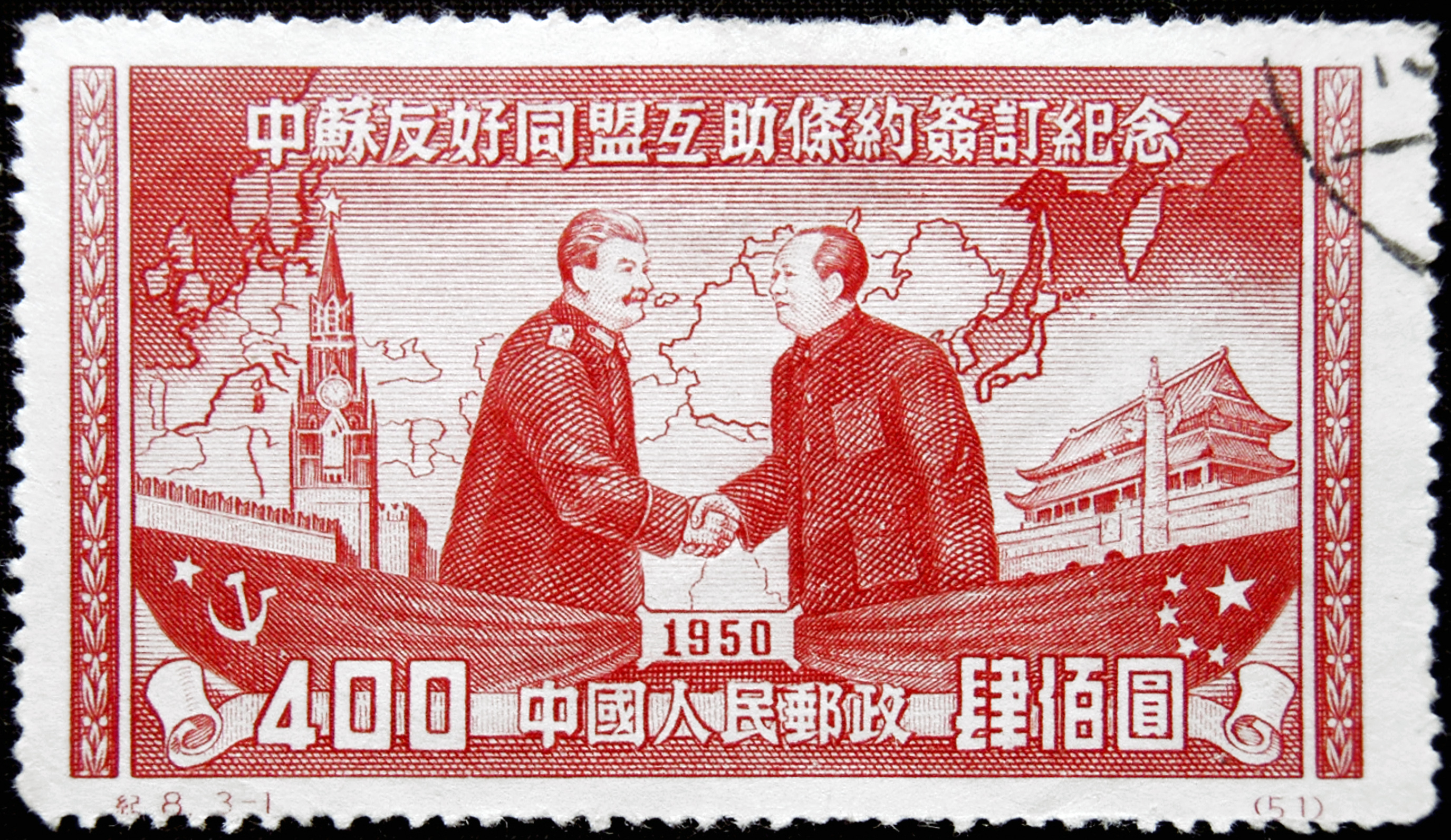
A 1950 Chinese postage stamp depicting Stalin and Mao shaking hands, representing friendly Sino-Soviet relations at the time the song was written.

"Moscow–Peking" (Russian: Москва — Пекин, romanized: Moskva — Pekin) or "Moscow–Beijing", also known as "The Russian and the Chinese are brothers forever" (Russian: Русский с китайцем — братья навек…), is a Soviet mass song composed in 1949 by Vano Muradeli to lyrics by Mikhail Vershinin. The song was written to commemorate the foundation of the People's Republic of China as well as to emphasise fraternal and amicable relations between the Soviet Union and the newly communist Chinese state. Due to the Sino-Soviet split during the 1960s, the song generally fell out of official favour by the end of the 1960s, and the lyric "the Russians and the Chinese are brothers forever" became a common ironic joke.

== History ==
The lyrics of "Moscow–Peking" were written in 1949 by Mikhail Vershinin for publication as a poem in a state-run magazine. According to an interview by Izvestia, Vershinin was serving a sentence in a forced labour camp at the time that he wrote the poem, and wrote it in exchange for the reduction of his sentence. By chance, composer Vano Muradeli read Vershinin's poem and decided to commit it to music, commemorating both the 70th birthday of Joseph Stalin as well as the foundation of the People's Republic of China. The original version of the song also directly referenced Stalin, although this lyric was replaced after the ascension of Nikita Khrushchev. Before the Sino-Soviet split, the song was used frequently at state events, in particular those involving China. The song was also played personally for Mao Zedong by the Alexandrov Ensemble during a tour of Beijing, a showing which sufficiently impressed Mao to the point of asking to meet the composer. Stalin was also known to be partial to the song and awarded Vano Muradeli the Stalin Prize, 2nd class, in 1951. After the Sino-Soviet split, the song was rarely heard, due to it being considered politically unacceptable.

== See also ==
- Music of the Soviet Union
- Hindi Rusi Bhai Bhai
