= International Bureau for Children's Rights =

International children's Rights

The International Bureau for Children's Rights (IBCR) is a non-governmental organization based in Montreal, Canada, which was established in 1994 by Judge Andrée Ruffo and Bernard Kouchner.

== Mission ==
The primary mission of the IBCR is to promote and protect children's rights in accordance with the Convention on the Rights of the Child (CRC), which was adopted by the UN in 1989 and ratified by 192 countries.

The IBCR is convinced that the implementation of children's rights can be facilitated by the sharing of know-how and good practices, as well as by the development of strategic partnerships, with intergovernmental agencies, NGOs and other institutions, which are also concerned about the rights of the child.

Today, the IBCR has several missions but it remains active in primarily two sectors: the sexual exploitation of children and children in armed conflict.

Since 2005, the IBCR has a special advisory status at the Economic and Social Council of the United Nations (ECOSOC).

== Projects ==
The IBCR is responsible for the Guidelines on Justice in Matters involving Child Victims and Witnesses of Crime adopted by United Nations Office on Drugs and Crime (UNODC) in 2005.

The IBCR officially launched the first Canadian national campaign for the prevention of the sexual exploitation of children in travel and tourism on November 18, 2010, at the Montreal-Pierre Elliott Trudeau International Airport, in Montreal, Quebec.

== Publications ==
- 2010 : Children and Armed Conflict : A Guide to International Humanitarian and Human Rights Law (new edition)
- 2009 : Connaître les droits de l'enfant
- 2008 : Boîte à outils pour la protection des enfants victimes de la traite ou à risque de le devenir
- Faire des droits de l'enfant une réalité dans la région des Grands Lacs africains : Les profils nationaux du Burundi, de la République du Congo, et la République démocratique du Congo et du Rwanda (version française)
- 2007 : Making Children's Rights Work in North Africa : Country Profiles on Algeria, Egypt, Libya, Morocco and Tunisia (versions anglaise et arabe)
- Stratégie d'action en matière de protection des droits des enfants victimes de la traite au Québec –Rapport final
- Version adaptée aux enfants des Lignes directrices en matière de justice pour les enfants victimes et témoins d'actes criminels
- 2006 : Making Children's Rights Work : Country Profiles on Cambodia, Indonesia, Sri Lanka, Timor Leste and Vietnam (version anglaise)
- 2005 : Mise en œuvre des droits de l'enfant : perspectives nationales et internationales
- 2003 : Children and Armed Conflict : A Guide to International Humanitarian and Human Rights Law
- Towards a Culture of Tolerance and Peace (an educational package)
- 2000 : Les dimensions internationales de l'exploitation sexuelle des enfants
