= Samuil Marshak =

Russian writer and poet (1887–1965)

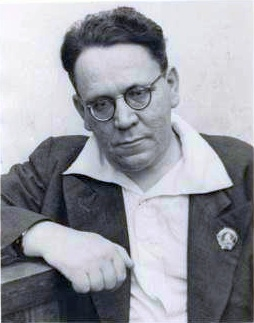
- Samuil Marshak (1930s)
- Born: 3 November 1887; Voronezh, Russian Empire
- Died: 4 July 1964 (aged 76); Moscow, Soviet Union
- Resting place: Novodevichy Cemetery, Moscow
- Education: University of London
- Writing career
- Language: Russian
- Genre: Poetry

Samuil Yakovlevich Marshak (alternative spelling: Marchak) (Russian: Самуил Яковлевич Маршак; 3 November [O.S. 22 October] 1887 – 4 July 1964) was a Soviet writer of Belarusian Jewish origin, translator and poet who wrote for both children and adults. He translated the sonnets and some other of the works of William Shakespeare, English poetry (including poems for children), and poetry from other languages. Maxim Gorky proclaimed Marshak to be "the founder of Russia's (Soviet) children's literature".

== Early years ==
Marshak was born to a Jewish family on 3 November 1887 in Voronezh. His father was a foreman at a soap-making plant. He had a good home education and later studied at the gymnasium (secondary school) of Ostrogozhsk, a suburb of Voronezh. He started to write poetry during his childhood years in Voronezh.

Marshak grew up with 2 brothers and 3 sisters. His older brother- Moisey (1885—1944) became an economist. His older sister- Susanna (1889—1985) became Schwartz after marriage. His younger brother Ilya (who wrote under the pseudonym M. Ilin) (1896—1953) became a chemical engineer and a popular science writer. His younger sister Liliya (who wrote as Elena Ilina) (1901—1964) also became Soviet author. Finally, his youngest sister Yudif' (1893) was pianist and a memoire writer.

In 1902, the Marshak family moved to Saint Petersburg. There was a complication: as a Jew, Marshak could not legally live outside the Pale of Settlement, thus he could not attend school while living in the city. Philanthropist and scholar Baron David Günzburg took an interest in Marshak and introduced him to the influential critic Vladimir Stasov. Stasov was so impressed by the schoolboy's literary talent that he arranged an exception from the Pale laws for Samuil and his family. He also introduced Marshak to Maxim Gorky and Feodor Chaliapin.

In 1904, Samuil was diagnosed with tuberculosis and could no longer continue to live in the cold climate of Saint Petersburg. Maxim Gorky arranged for Samuil to live with his family in the Black Sea resort town of Yalta in Crimea (1904–1907). Gorky and Chaliapin also paid for his education and therapy. However, he spent much of this period in Kerch also in Crimea, living with the Fremerman family.

== Young poet, philosopher and translator ==
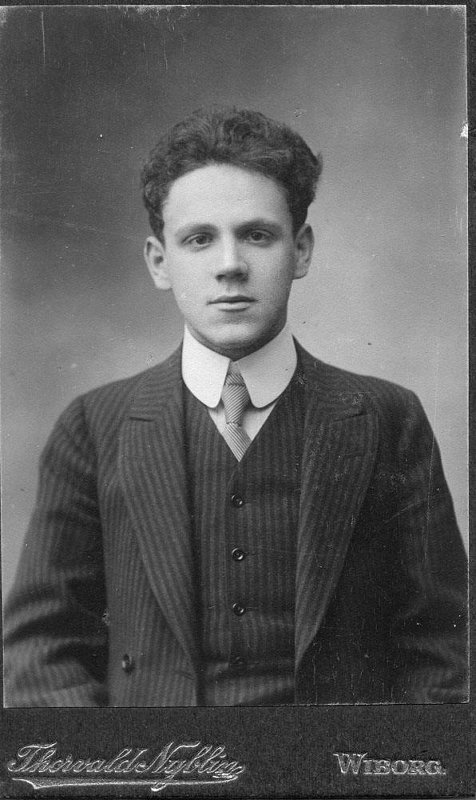
Marshak at the age of 23-24 on a 1911 photograph

In 1904, he published his first works in the magazine Jewish Life and in the mid- to late 1900s, Marshak created a body of Zionist verse, some of which appeared in such periodicals as Young Judea. In 1907 he returned to Saint Petersburg and subsequently published numerous works in the popular magazine Satyricon.

Marshak failed to gain admission at a university in Russia due to 'political insecurity' and earned his living giving lessons and writing for magazines. From his first trip to the Middle East he brought back many impressions, poems and a beautiful wife.

In 1912 he moved to England and studied philosophy at the University of London. He fell in love with English culture and with poetry written in English. In his senior year at the university, he published his translations of the poems written by William Blake, Robert Burns and William Wordsworth, published in Russia. His 1913 visit to an experimental "free" school in Wales (led by the Tolstoyan Philip Oyler) is noted as the event that sparked his professional interest in children.

Shortly before World War I, in 1914, he returned to Russia and devoted himself to translation.

== Children's poetry ==
In 1914 Marshak and his wife worked with children of Jewish refugees in Voronezh. The death of Marshak's young daughter in 1915 directed him toward children's literature. In 1920 he moved to Yekaterinodar (now Krasnodar) to head the province's orphanages and it was there that he and a group of enthusiasts, including Yelena Vasilyeva, organized Children's town that included a children's theater, library, and studios. For this theater, he co-wrote plays that later became the book Theater for Children.

In 1922, Marshak moved back to what was then Petrograd to become the head of the Children's Literature Studio. He published the following works at the Raduga (Радуга; in English, "rainbow") publishing house: Детки в клетке (Kids in a cage), Пожар (Fire) 1923, Сказка о глупом мышонке (The Tale of a Silly Mouse), Синяя птица (Blue bird), Цирк (Circus), Мороженое (Ice Cream), Вчера и сегодня» (Yesterday and today) 1925, Багаж (Luggage) 1926, Пудель (Poodle), Почта (Post Office) 1927, and Вот какой рассеянный (What an absent-minded guy) 1930.

Marshak had a prolific career in children's literature. Soviet critic Viktor Shklovsky wrote that "Samuil Marshak understood that many new writers would appear in the new Soviet republic. He stood at the door of literature, a benevolent angel, armed not with a sword or with a pencil, but with words on work and inspiration." Marshak's contributions to the field of children's literature was not just limited to his own writings. In 1924, he became the head of the children's branch of the state publishing house Gosizdat (GIZ), a position he held for over a decade. Through his role as editor, Marshak attracted some of Russia's best writers to try their hand at writing for children, including Evgeny Schwartz and OBERIU member Daniil Kharms.

== Translations ==
Among his Russian translations there are William Shakespeare's sonnets and songs from Shakespeare's plays, The Merry Wives of Windsor (together with Mikhail Morozov, who translated prosaic scenes), poems of Robert Burns, William Blake, Lord Byron, Percy Bysshe Shelley, John Keats, William Wordsworth, Alfred, Lord Tennyson, Robert Browning, Robert Louis Stevenson, W. B. Yeats, Edward Lear, Lewis Carroll, Rudyard Kipling, T. S. Eliot, A. A. Milne, English and Scottish folk ballads, poems from nursery rhymes. Besides English poetry, he translated poems of Heinrich Heine, Sándor Petőfi, Gianni Rodari and Hovhannes Tumanyan.

His main work in this area is translation of Shakespeare's sonnets (1948). This translation has enjoyed great success over the years. Some Shakespeare sonnets in Marshak's translation have been set to music (in classical style by Dmitry Kabalevsky, in pop style by Tikhon Khrennikov, Mikael Tariverdiev, Alla Pugacheva and others, even in rock style — Cruise). His translations are considered classics in Russia. But many of Marshak's poetic translations became so entrenched in Russian culture, that it was often quipped that he was not so much a translator as a co-author.

== Later years ==
In 1937 Marshak moved to Moscow, where he worked on children's books and translations. Composer Galina Konstantinovna Smirnova set some of his work to music. During World War II, he published satires against the Nazis. After the war he continued to publish children's books including: Разноцветная книга (Multicolored book) 1948, Круглый год (All year round) 1948, Тихая сказка (A Quiet tale) 1956, etc.

In the last years of his life, he wrote aphoristic verses that he named lyrical epigrams. They were published in his last book, Selected Lyrics (Избранная Лирика) in 1963. He also published three tale plays: The Twelve Months 1943, Afraid of Troubles - Cannot Have Luck 1962, and Smart Things 1964.

Although not widely known, in the Soviet era, Marshak was on a (political) razor's edge and barely escaped death in 1937. His name was often mentioned in the documents of the eliminated Jewish Anti-Fascist Committee. However, the process of the committee ended in August 1952 (12 executed and 98 subjected to repression) and Marshak was not accused.

Samuil Marshak died on 4 July 1964 and was buried in Moscow in Novodevichy Cemetery. He survived by one son Immanuil Marshak (1917—1977), a physicist. His other son and daughter did not survive till adulthood.

== Honours and awards ==
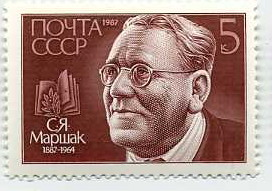
Samuil Marshak on a 1987 Soviet post stamp

- Four Stalin Prizes:

second degree (1942) – a poetic text to posters and cartoons
second degree (1946) – for the play-tale "Twelve Months" (1943)
second degree (1949) – translations of sonnets by William Shakespeare
first degree (1951) – a collection of "Verses for Children"

- Lenin Prize (1963) – for the book "Selected poetry for children" (1962) and children's books: "A quiet tale", "Big pocket", "The Adventure of the road", "Calm down", "From one to ten", "Vaks Blob", "Who can find a ring", "Merry journey from A to Z".
- Two Orders of Lenin, incl 1939
- Order of the Patriotic War, 1st class (1945)
- Order of the Red Banner of Labour
- Honorary president of Robert Burns World Federation (1960)
- In 2012, his books were included in an exhibit at the Museum of Modern Art

== See also ==
- Vladimir Lebedev – he illustrated many of Marshak's books
- The Twelve Months (1956 film)
- The Twelve Months (1972 film)
- Twelve Months (1980 film)
