= B-convex space =

Class of Banach space in mathematics

In functional analysis, the class of B-convex spaces is a class of Banach space. The concept of B-convexity was defined and used to characterize Banach spaces that have the strong law of large numbers by Anatole Beck in 1962; accordingly, "B-convexity" is understood as an abbreviation of Beck convexity. Beck proved the following theorem: A Banach space is B-convex if and only if every sequence of independent, symmetric, uniformly bounded and Radon random variables in that space satisfies the strong law of large numbers.

Let X be a Banach space with norm || ||. X is said to be B-convex if for some ε > 0 and some natural number n, it holds true that whenever x_{1}, ..., x_{n} are elements of the closed unit ball of X, there is a choice of signs α_{1}, ..., α_{n} ∈ {−1, +1} such that

$$\left\| \sum_{i = 1}^{n} \alpha_{i} x_{i} \right\| \leq (1 - \varepsilon) n.$$

Later authors have shown that B-convexity is equivalent to a number of other important properties in the theory of Banach spaces. Being B-convex and having Rademacher type $p>1$ were shown to be equivalent Banach-space properties by Gilles Pisier.
