= Nadezhda Simonyan =

Russian composer

Nadezhda Simonyan (26 February 1922 - 7 June 1997) was a Russian composer, who wrote over 40 film scores for movies, radio, and television, as well as chamber and orchestral works, and music for circus performances.

Simonyan was born in Rostov-on-the-Don. She studied composition and piano at Leningrad Conservatory, where she received a diploma in 1950 and earned a medal. Her teachers included Oles Chishko and Venedikt Pushkov.

In 1956, Simonyan wrote her first film soundtrack for Old Man Khottabych, a children's film by Gennadii Kazanskii. Peter Rollberg described Simonyan's strength as a composer as a “. . . warm melodiousness that equally energizes cheerful, dramatic, and tragic episodes with a pragmatic, flexible approach to instrumentation.” In 1960, Italian film maker Federico Fellini praised her soundtrack for the movie Lady with the Dog. She often used smaller chamber orchestras, sometimes with folk instruments, for her film scores.

== Chamber ==
- Sonata (violin and piano)

== Circus ==
- incidental music

== Film scores ==
- Adventures of Prince Florizel
- Chief of Chukotka
- Day of Happiness
- Duel
- Fifth Quarter
- Flying Carpet
- For No Apparent Reason
- Green Dale
- In the Town of S
- Izhora Battalion
- Lady with the Dog
- Lyalka-Ruslan and His Friend Sanka
- Nights of Farewell (with Yuri Prokoviev)
- Old Man Khottabych
- Only One
- Pani Mariya
- Sinful Angel
- Smart Things
- Snow Queen
- Strict Male Life
- Twelve Months
- Two Lines in Small Font
- Vesenniye Perevyortyshi
- While the Mountains Still Stand

== Orchestra ==
- Concerto for Piano and Orchestra

== Piano ==
- pieces

== Radio scores ==
- Golden Apples
- On the Bank of Sevan
- Story of Turkey
- Three Bears
- Year of My Birth

== Vocal ==
- Lake Sevan Cantata
- romances
- songs
