= Oles Chishko =

Soviet composer and singer

Oles' Semyenovich Chishko (Ukrainian: Олесь Семенович Чишко; 1895–1976) was a Ukrainian and Russian Soviet composer and singer (tenor).

Oles' Semyenovich Chishko was born on 3 July 1895. He graduated from the Kharkiv Institute of Music and Drama (vocal) in 1924 and studied composition with Pyotr Ryazanov at the Leningrad Conservatory. Chishko was a soloist in the opera theatres of Kharkiv, Kiev, Odessa, and Leningrad. He was also the first performer of the roles of Pierre Bezukhov in War and Peace by Sergei Prokofiev, Kobzar in "Taras Bulba" by Lysenko, and Pyotr in "V plenu u yablon" by himself. His students included film composer Nadezhda Simonyan.

== Operas ==
- "Judith" (performed in 1923, Novorossiysk),
- "V plenu u yablon" (performed in 1931, Odessa),
- "Bronenosets Potyomkin" (performed in 1937, Leningrad, 1938, Moscow),
- "Makhmud Tarobi" (performed in 1944, Tashkent).

== Bibliography ==
- [Gusin] Гусин И., О. С. Чишко. Очерк жизни и творчества, Л.,1960;
- [Budyakovsky] Будяковский А., "Броненосец "Потемкин"", Л., 1960;
- [Grinberg] Гринберг М., Музыкальный героический спектакль "Броненосец "Потемкин"" в Ленинграде, "Театр", 1937, No. 5;
- [Khristiansen] Христиансен П., "Броненосец "Потемкин" в Большом театре, "Советская музыка", 1938, No. 1
