= Khattab, Bojnord =

Khattab خطاب
- Village
- Location within Iran
- Coordinates: 37°32′39″N 57°36′54″E
- Country: Iran
- Province: North Khorasan
- County: Bojnord
- Bakhsh: Garmkhan
- Rural District: Garmkhan

Population (2006)
  - Total: 116
- Time zone: UTC+3:30 (IRST)
  - Summer (DST): UTC+4:30 (IRDT)

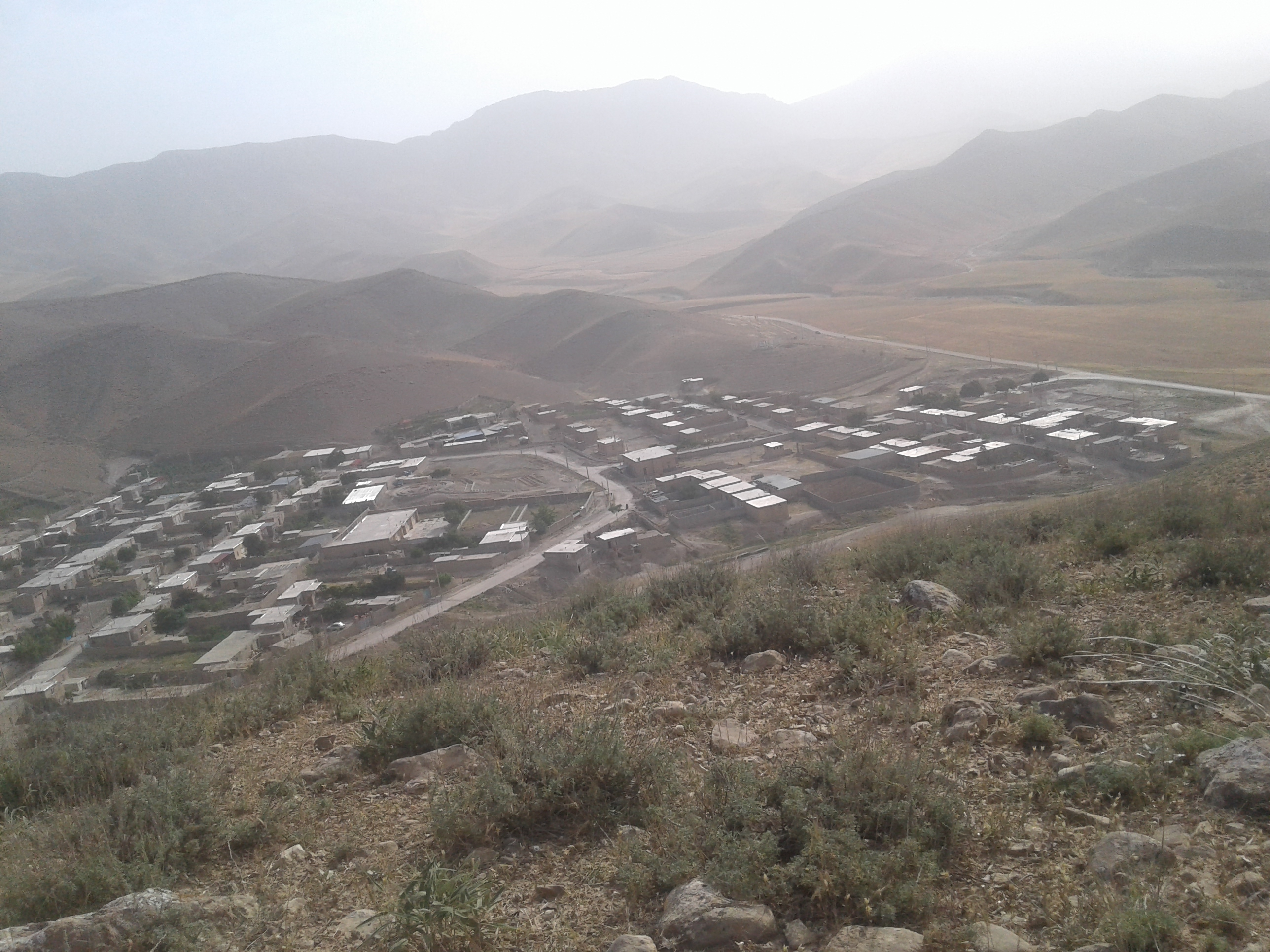

Khattab (Persian: خطاب, also Romanized as Khaţţāb and Khaţāb; also known as Khatāb-e Sheykh) is a village in Garmkhan Rural District, Garmkhan District, Bojnord County, North Khorasan Province, Iran. At the 2006 census, its population was 116, in 33 families.
