= Nejib Khattab =

Tunisian radio and television presenter (1953–1998)

- Born: 24 May 1953; Tunisia
- Died: 25 April 1998 (aged 44)
- Occupations: Television and radio producer; presenter

Nejib Khattab (Arabic: نجيب الخطاب; 24 May 1953 – 25 April 1998) was a Tunisian radio and television presenter. Considered the pioneer of direct and variety in Arab televisions, he is the revealer for the Tunisian public of many Arab singers.

== Biography ==
He began his career on the Tunisian radio and television in the sports category, commenting particularly on the matches of the national team in the 1978 football world cup. He had a significant success in the 1980s and 1990s hosting radio shows, including Alwan wa ajwaa and Yaoum said, and producing and hosting Saturday night and Sunday television shows, including Khamsa ala khamsa, Laou samahtom and Sahriya al fadhaeya. Considered the pioneer of show hosting a variety of TV programs in the Arabic televisions, he is the revealer of many Arab singers to the Tunisian public, including Mayada Hennaoui, Assala Nasri, Georges Wassouf, Kadhem Essaher, Mahmoud Yassine, Safia Amri, Sophia Sadek, Najet Attia, Amina Fakhet, Adnane Chaouachi, Lotfi Bouchnak, and many other names which have earned him the title of "the star producer ".

Orphaned from an early age, he is known for his deep attachment to his mother: he begins each of his programs with his famous phrase "Ma ridha Allah ella bi ridha alwalidain" which translates into "Your parents are your gateway to paradise".

He died of a sudden cardiac arrest the day he was supposed to host a show that evening. His unexpected death took the Arab world and the Tunisian public by surprise.

On 23 October 2011, the Tunisian Television Establishment named one of its studios after him.

== Personal life ==
His daughter's name is Ahlem Nejib Khattab is a journalist like her father and his wife's name is Amel.

== Television programs ==
- Khamsa ala Khamsa
- Law Samahtom
- Sahriya ala fadhaiya
