= Khotb, Maragheh =

Khotb خطب
- Village
- Location within Iran
- Coordinates: 37°27′39″N 46°20′28″E
- Country: Iran
- Province: East Azerbaijan
- County: Maragheh
- Bakhsh: Central
- Rural District: Sarajuy-ye Gharbi

Population (2006)
  - Total: 163
- Time zone: UTC+3:30 (IRST)
  - Summer (DST): UTC+4:30 (IRDT)

Khotb (Persian: خطب, also Romanized as Khoţb; also known as Qareh Kand-e Khoţb) is a village in Sarajuy-ye Gharbi Rural District, in the Central District of Maragheh County, East Azerbaijan Province, Iran. At the 2006 census, its population was 163, in 36 families.
