= Abdul Hadi Abdul Khattab =

Malaysian air force officer and politician

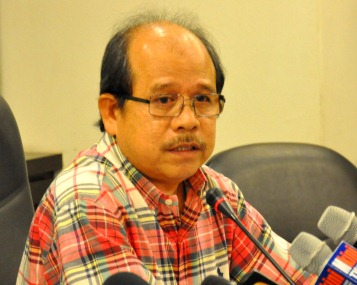
- General (R) Dato' Abdul Hadi Abdul Khattab
- Born: 1952/1953
- Military career
- Allegiance: Malaysia
- Branch: Royal Malaysian Air Force
- Rank: Brigadier General

Brigadier General (R) Datuk Abdul Hadi bin Abdul Khatab (born 1952 or 1953 (age 73–74)) is a former armed forces personnel serving with the Royal Malaysian Air Force (RMAF).

Abdul Hadi Abdul Khattab joined the People's Justice Party (PKR) on 24 May 2012.

== Forced retirement ==
Abdul Hadi Abdul Khattab was one of the parties held responsible for the disappearance of two jet engines from the Sungai Besi Airbase in 2007. The engines were later found in a warehouse in Uruguay.

Abdul Hadi Abdul Khattab was charged under the clause 4 and 5 PMAT Number 1, 1975, and discharged from military service under Section 9 of the Federal Armed Forces Act 1972. He was dishonorably discharged under said act for failing to comply with military conduct resulting in negligence.

Testimonies from his peers made during the court case were not favorable.

Abdul Hadi was one of five high-ranking officers who were charged with negligence and forced to retire. They later sued the Armed Forces Council over their dismissal. The suit was dismissed by a judge as "frivolous".
