= Ali Khattab =

- Born: July 14, 1977 (age 48)
- Origin: Cairo, Egypt
- Genres: Acústica / Flamenco / Fusión
- Occupation: Musician / Guitar Player / Composer
- Instruments: String instruments
- Labels: Nuevos Medios

Ali Khattab (born July 4, 1977) is an Egyptian composer and guitarist. In his works, he combines the elements of two musical worlds and traditions: The Arab-Oriental and the Gypsy-Andalusian, flamenco. From the age of seventeen, the time when he first starts performing on stage, everything he does is meant to lead him to two places: the cradle of flamenco, Jerez de la Frontera. From then on, Ali spends a lot of time in Andalucia, meeting and performing with influential flamenco musicians, singers, guitarists, and dancers who introduce him to the true universe of flamenco. Following a tour in Spain and the middle east, Ali Khattab's first album named "Al Zarqa", (Blue eyed brunette) was released in March 2010 in Madrid, Spain.

== Discography ==
- 2010: Al-Zarqa
- 2014: Sin Pais

== Awards ==
Independent Music Awards 2012: "A..dios" - Best World Traditional Song
