= French Provincial =

Souvenirs d’en France
- Theatrical release poster
- Directed by: André Téchiné
- Written by: Marilyn Goldin; André Téchiné
- Produced by: Véra Belmont
- Starring: Jeanne Moreau; Michel Auclair; Orane Demazis; Marie-France Pisier; Françoise Lebrun
- Cinematography: Bruno Nuytten
- Edited by: Anne-Marie Deshayes
- Music by: Philippe Sarde
- Release dates: 3 September 1975 (France); 9 October 1975 (US)
- Running time: 90 min.
- Country: France
- Language: French
- Box office: $1.1 million

French Provincial (French: Souvenirs d’en France) is a 1975 French drama film directed by André Téchiné, starring Jeanne Moreau, Michel Auclair and Marie-France Pisier. The film presents an overview of French life and politics though the changes within one family in southwestern France from the 1930s through the 1970s.

== Plot ==
At the beginning of the 20th century, Pédret, a Spanish immigrant, arrives in the southwest French country side. He becomes a blacksmith and marries Augustine, the daughter of the village baker. By 1936 Pédret's forge has become a foundry where his three sons are the managers. Years later when Augustine, now a bourgeois matriarch, realizes that her son Hector is having an affair with Berthe, a lowly seamstress, she tries to ruin Berthe's business and drive her out of town even if it means bribing her. But old Pédret, who knows that his sons have their spirits broken, can see that Berthe has the blunt good sense they lack, and he arranges for Bethe and Hector to be married.

While the bourgeois wives of the two other sons mope and become peevish, Berthe makes herself useful. In the war, she is a heroine of the Resistance; when the business is imperiled by a strike, she settles it by acceding to the workers demands. She takes over the dominant role in management, and becomes the new matriarch as well. In contrast with the practical Berthe, Regina, her sister in law, is flighty. Dark and beautiful, Regina is married to Prosper, Pédret's youngest son and the only one with a college education. But Regina and the handsome, refined Prosper are a mismatch.

A rapacious dreamer, Regina, fed up with the dull austerity of provincial society, runs off with an American soldier. Eventually, Berthe comes to control the family's fortunes, but economic challenges in the 1950s force her to turn to an unlikely source for financial help: her obnoxious sister-in-law Regina who has come back, more stunning than ever, with an American industrialist lover. Regina may now be willing to aid Berthe in exchange for her freedom.

== Cast ==
- Jeanne Moreau: Berthe
- Michel Auclair: Hector
- Marie-France Pisier: Régina
- Claude Mann: Prosper
- Orane Demazis: Augustine old
- Aram Stephan: Pédret old
- Hélène Surgère: Lucie
- Julien Guiomar: Victor
- Michèle Moretti: Pierrette
- Pierre Baillot: Pierre
- Marc Chapiteau: Pédret young
- Françoise Lebrun: Augustine young
- Jean Rougeul: Valnoble
- Alan Scott: Richard

== Analysis ==
Téchiné's second film is a mix of black comedy, romantic drama and nostalgia, told in an unsettling inconsistent style. The film traces the lives of its characters through the period of Nazi occupation to the present day, but their story is secondary. The focus of the film is the family-owned factory. We see its birth, its maturing, and its decline, as if it were a living thing. Around it, times change, the people change, social attitudes and hair-styles change, but the factory remains there, immutable and indifferent. The film's style mingles European and American directors Godard, Bernardo Bertolucci, Orson Welles, William Wyler, Jean Cocteau Alfred Hitchcock, Jacques Tati among others. The flashback sequence of Pedret's youth wings from Wuthering Heights and the flaming silhouettes of Gone with the Wind to The Conformist and The Spider's Stratagem.

French Provincial was a show case piece for legendary French actress Jeanne Moreau. Despite the fact that her character in the film scarcely seems to age over a 30-year period, she appears perfectly at ease with this style of drama and shows a surprising comic flair in some scenes.

== Reception ==
Famous critic Pauline Kael called the film: " Marvelous". "Téchiné and Goldin (the screenwriter) may not know anything except movies, but the way they know movies is enough for me".
