= The Twelve Months (1972 film) =

- Directed by: Anatoliy Granik
- Written by: Anatoliy Granik; Samuil Marshak (play)
- Cinematography: Rostislav Davydov
- Music by: Nadezhda Simonyan
- Distributed by: Lenfilm
- Release date: 1973
- Running time: 135 minutes
- Country: Soviet Union
- Language: Russian

The Twelve Months (Russian: Двенадцать месяцев, romanized: Dvenadtsat mesyatsev) is a 1973 Soviet Lenfilm fantasy film directed by Anatoliy Granik based on the play by Samuil Marshak adapted from the fairy tale with the same name.

== Plot ==
=== Episode 1 ===
An orphaned young girl lives with her indifferent stepmother, who treats her like a servant, and her spoiled stepsister. On New Year's Eve, the stepmother and stepsister send the girl into the forest to gather firewood. While in the woods, strange things begin to happen—animals start talking and playing like humans. A kind old soldier, whom the girl had befriended earlier, explains that miracles often occur on this day. He shares a family tale of his ancestor meeting the Twelve Months during a New Year's celebration.

Meanwhile, the country's queen—a selfish teenage girl who also lost her parents as a child—comes up with a whimsical demand: a basket of fresh snowdrops as a New Year's gift. She promises a basket of gold to whoever fulfills this request, despite her elderly professor's protests about the impossibility of finding snowdrops in winter. The stepmother and stepsister, enticed by the reward, care little about the seasonality of the flowers and decide to send the girl on the impossible task.

Struggling in the freezing cold, the girl eventually resigns herself to her fate, prepared to die in the forest. However, she stumbles upon a fire surrounded by the Twelve Months. She asks to warm herself by the fire, and while the winter months hesitate, the spring and summer months warmly welcome her. After hearing her plight, April convinces his brothers to let him rule for one hour so she can collect the snowdrops. They agree, bringing a brief spring to the forest, and soon the ground is blanketed with flowers.

As the girl gathers the snowdrops, the Months talk about her. They reveal they've always admired her kind and selfless nature, and April confesses his deep love for her. Before she leaves, April gives her a magical ring that will allow her to summon them in times of need but warns her not to reveal their existence to anyone. Grateful and happy, the girl returns home.

=== Episode 2 ===
While the girl sleeps, her envious stepsister steals the magical ring and goes with her mother to the royal palace to claim the reward. They lie, saying they found the snowdrops near an unfrozen lake. The queen decides to visit the location herself, forcing the stepmother to confess that the snowdrops were found by her stepdaughter. Furious, the queen orders her guards to bring the girl to the forest.

When they arrive, the queen, captivated by the girl's beauty, offers her riches, but the girl declines, asking only for the return of her stolen ring. The queen retrieves it from the stepsister but demands to know its origin and who provided the snowdrops. The girl refuses to betray the Twelve Months, prompting the queen to order her coat removed as punishment. The old soldier covers the girl with his cloak, earning the queen's ire. When the professor tries to intervene, the queen, in a fit of rage, throws the ring into the snow and threatens to throw the girl into an icy lake.

Remembering the instructions from the Months, the girl recites a spell over the ring, and suddenly spring returns to the forest. She vanishes as the queen gleefully gathers more flowers. However, the snowdrops quickly disappear, replaced by berries, and the seasons begin to shift rapidly—summer turns to autumn, and winter returns. Exhausted, the queen and her entourage struggle through the harsh weather.

The Months reappear and rescue the girl, returning her ring and providing her with a dowry of fine clothes and a sleigh drawn by white horses. When the queen and her party arrive at the clearing, the girl, now dressed in regal attire, emerges. The queen, impressed, politely asks for help, and the girl agrees.

In the end, the group departs together in the sleigh of the Twelve Months, having learned lessons about kindness, humility, and respect.

== Cast ==
- Natalya Popova — Stepdaughter
- Marina Maltseva — Stepsister
- Olga Wiklandt — Stepmother
- Liana Zhvaniya — The Queen
- Nikolay Volkov — Professor
- Tatiyana Pelttser — Gofmejsterina
- Leonid Kuravlyov — Soldier
- Konstantin Adashevskiy — The Head of the Royal Guard
- Alexander Sokolov — The Chancellors your
- Georgy Teikh — Royal Prosecutor
- Lev Lemke — The Eastern Ambassador
- Alexey Kozhevnikov — The Western Ambassador
- Arkady Trusov — December
- Boris Ryzhukhin —January
- Alexander Afanasiev — February
- Alexander Gavrilov — March
- Andrey Bosov — April
- Victor Perevalov — May
- Victor Semyonovsky — June
- Sergey Dvoretsky — July
- Valentin Zhilyaev — August
- Anatoly Stepanov — September
- Nikolay Kuzmin — November
- Lev Usachev — The Moon
