= Khattabi =

Khattabi is a surname. Notable people with the surname include:

- Abd el-Krim (1882/83–1963), Moroccan political and military leader
- Ali El-Khattabi or Ali Elkhattabi (born 1977), Dutch-Moroccan footballer
- Elarbi Khattabi (born 1967), Moroccan long-distance runner
- Fadila Khattabi (born 1962), French politician
- Younes Khattabi (born 1984), French-Moroccan rugby league footballer
- Zakia Khattabi (born 1976), Belgian-Moroccan politician

== See also ==
- Khattab (name)
