= Andrée Ruffo =

Canadian judge

Andrée Ruffo is a former Quebec judge named to the Bench in 1987.

She faced numerous disciplinary hearings in the past, to the point where her legal fees, paid by the province, have totaled more than $1 million.

She was reprimanded after one episode in 1997 where she demanded to see the resumes of 125 youth workers she thought weren't qualified to care for children.

In October, 2004 the Quebec Judicial Council noting several ethical shortcomings, recommended her dismissal as a judge. She was accused primarily of having publicly discussed matters she was legally involved with, of having hidden links of friendship with an expert witness who testified before her, and of having lent her name and used the prestige of her position in a 2002 Via Rail television advertisement.

Following this recommendation in conformity with mandatory legal procedure the Quebec Government asked the Quebec Appeal Court to investigate.

In December, 2005, five judges of the Quebec Court of Appeal upheld the ruling of the Quebec Judicial Council and recommended Judge Ruffo's dismissal. Andrée Ruffo asked permission to appeal this decision to the Supreme Court of Canada.

In May, 2006, the Supreme Court refused to hear the appeal, which initiated the formal process of dismissal by the Quebec Attorney General. Madame Ruffo chose to resign before the dismissal was issued.
