= Marie-France Pisier =

French actress, screenwriter and director (1944–2011)

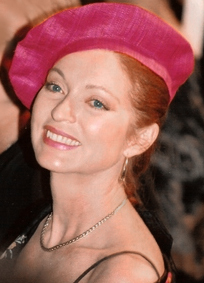
- Pisier in 1992
- Born: 10 May 1944; Dalat, French Indochina
- Died: 24 April 2011 (aged 66); Toulon, France
- Occupations: Actress, screenwriter, director
- Years active: 1962–2010
- Spouse(s): Georges Kiejman (m. 1973; div. 1979) Thierry Funck-Brentano (?–2011, her death)
- Children: 2
- Relatives: Gilles Pisier (brother); Évelyne Pisier (sister)
- Awards: César Award; Best Supporting Actress; 1976 Cousin Cousine and French Provincial; 1977 Barocco

Marie-France Pisier (10 May 1944 – 24 April 2011) was a French actress, screenwriter, and director. She appeared in numerous films of the French New Wave, and twice earned the national César Award for Best Supporting Actress.

== Early life ==
Pisier was born on 10 May 1944 in Dalat (now Vietnam), where her father was serving as a colonial official in French Indochina. Her younger brother, Gilles Pisier, is a mathematician and a member of the French Academy of Sciences. Her sister, political scientist Evelyn, was the first wife of Bernard Kouchner, a French politician and the co-founder of Médecins Sans Frontières. The family moved to Paris when Marie-France was 12 years old.

== Career ==
As a teenager, Pisier began acting with amateur theater groups. Years later, Pisier would make her screen acting debut for director François Truffaut in his 1962 film Antoine and Colette. She had a brief, but incendiary, romance with the older, married Truffaut. Despite its end, she later appeared in Truffaut's Stolen Kisses (Baisers volés, 1968) and Love on the Run (L'Amour en fuite, 1979), the fifth and final film in Truffaut's series about the character Antoine Doinel. Pisier was credited as a co-writer of the screenplay. In a review in The New York Times, film critic Vincent Canby praised her "ravishing performance".

Pisier later collaborated on the screenplay to Jacques Rivette's Celine and Julie Go Boating (Céline et Julie vont en bateau, 1974); she also played a significant supporting role in the film. Later in the same year, she had a role in Luis Buñuel's Phantom of Liberty.

Pisier gained widespread public recognition in 1975 when she appeared in Jean-Charles Tacchella's popular comedy Cousin Cousine. Her role as the volatile Karine earned her a César Award for Best Supporting Actress. Her subsequent feature films included three with director André Téchiné: French Provincial (Souvenirs en France, 1975); The Bronte Sisters (Les sœurs Brontë, 1979), in which she portrayed Charlotte; and Barocco (1976), for which she won a second César for her performance alongside Isabelle Adjani and Gérard Depardieu.

Pisier attempted to crack the American film industry with The Other Side of Midnight (1977), adapted from a Sidney Sheldon novel. She appeared on American television in the miniseries The French Atlantic Affair (1979), and Scruples the next year. She made two more Hollywood films, French Postcards (1979) with Debra Winger and Chanel Solitaire (1981) with Timothy Dalton.

Returning to France, Pisier starred in films like The Ace of Aces with Jean-Paul Belmondo, and in the Thomas Mann adaptation Der Zauberberg / The Magic Mountain (1982). She also starred in Parking (1985), with Francis Huster and Laurent Malet. Pisier made her directorial debut with The Governor's Party (Le bal du gouverneur, 1990), which she adapted from her own novel that was published in 1984. She also played Madame Verdurin in Raúl Ruiz's adaptation of Marcel Proust, Time Regained (Le temps retrouvé, 1999). Her final film as director was with Bérénice Bejo (winner of the César Award for Best Actress in The Artist) in Like An Airplane (Comme un avion, 2002), and her final film appearance was in Il Reste du Jambon? in 2010.

== Personal life ==
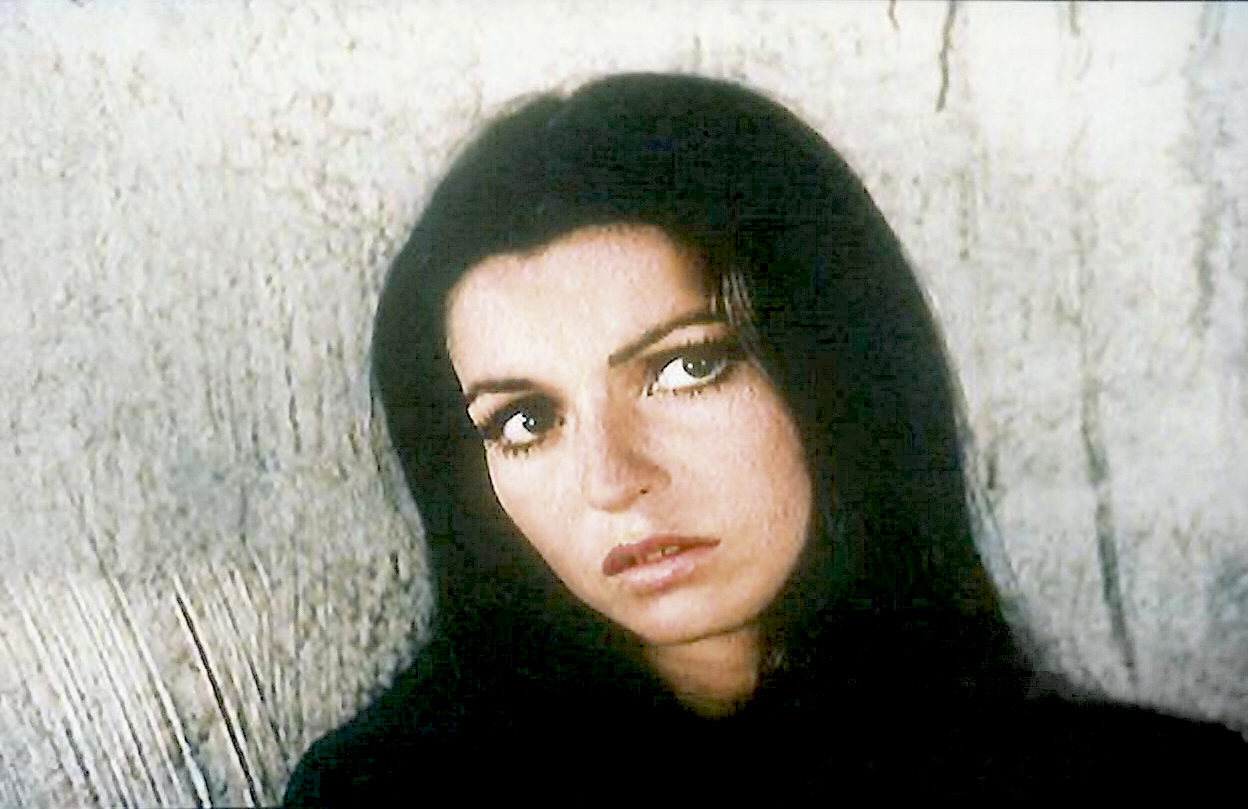
Marie-France Pisier, 1973

Pisier completed her secondary education at the Lycée de jenunes filles Albert-Calmette where she was noted as an excellent student. For further education, she attended the University of Nice and the University of Paris where she obtained degrees in Law and Political Science and has spoken of decisions to be an actress instead of becoming a lawyer. She was active in student demonstrations, and was a supporter of women's rights and legal abortion and signed the Manifesto of the 343 in 1971. She overcame breast cancer in the 1990s.

Her first marriage from 1973 to 1979 to lawyer Georges Kiejman ended in divorce due to irreconcilable differences. She was briefly in a relationship with actor Timothy Dalton.

Pisier later on resided in Saint-Cyr-sur-Mer, Var, and was married to Thierry Funck-Brentano. The couple had two children: a son, Mathieu, and a daughter, Iris.

== Death ==
Pisier died on 24 April 2011, aged 66. She was found dead in her swimming pool by Funck-Brentano and is believed to have drowned. She was survived by her sister Évelyne, brother Gilles, and both children. The local mayor announced her death to the news media and President Nicolas Sarkozy made a public statement honouring "her supreme elegance born of the most perfect simplicity". Isabelle Huppert publicly paid tribute to Pisier shortly after her death.

== Filmography ==
=== Actress ===
Year	Title	Role	Director	Notes
1961	Qui ose nous accuser?		Serge Komor	
1962	Antoine and Colette	Colette	François Truffaut	From Love at Twenty
1962	The Devil and the Ten Commandments		Julien Duvivier	
1963	Les Saintes-Nitouches	Angelica	Pierre Montazel	
1964	Les Yeux cernés	Klara	Robert Hossein	
1964	La mort d'un tueur	Maria / Claudia	Robert Hossein	
1964	Les amoureux du France	Sylvia	Pierre Grimblat & François Reichenbach	
1965	The Vampire of Düsseldorf	Anna	Robert Hossein	
1966	Maigret a Pigalle		Mario Landi	
1966	Trans-Europ-Express	Eva	Alain Robbe-Grillet	
1967	Non sta bene rubare il tesoro	Flo	Mario di Nardo	
1968	Stolen Kisses	Colette Tazzi	François Truffaut	
1968	L'écume des jours	Alise	Charles Belmont	
1969	Paulina Is Leaving	Isabelle	André Téchiné	
1969	Nous n'irons plus au bois	Lise	Georges Dumoulin	
1972	Le journal d'un suicidé	The young anarchist	Stanislav Stanojevic	
1972	La mort d'un champion	Jane Herbin	Abder Isker	TV movie
1972	Pot-Bouille	Berthe Josserand	Yves-André Hubert	TV Mini-Series
1972–1973	Les gens de Mogador	Ludivine Peyrissac Vernet	Robert Mazoyer	TV series (13 episodes)
1973	Féminin-féminin	Françoise	Henri Calef & João Correa	
1973	Juliette?		Philippe Pilard	Short
1973	Témoignages		Paul Siegrist	TV series (1 episode)
1973	Les aventures du capitaine Luckner	Kim	François Villiers	TV series (1 episode)
1974	The Phantom of Liberty	Mrs. Calmette	Luis Buñuel	
1974	Céline and Julie Go Boating	Sophie	Jacques Rivette	Also co-writer
1975	Cousin Cousine	Karine	Jean-Charles Tacchella	César Award for Best Supporting Actress; Nominated - National Society of Film Critics Award for Best Supporting Actress; Nominated - New York Film Critics Circle Award for Best Supporting Actress
1975	French Provincial	Régina Pedret	André Téchiné	
1976	Barocco	Nelly	André Téchiné	César Award for Best Supporting Actress
1976	Surreal Estate	Agathe	Eduardo de Gregorio	
1976	Body of My Enemy	Gilberte Liégard	Henri Verneuil	
1977	Les apprentis sorciers	Madame Umlaut	Edgardo Cozarinsky	
1977	The Other Side of Midnight	Noelle Page	Charles Jarrott	
1978	Le temps d'une République	Louise Fontas	Michel Mitrani	TV series (1 episode)
1979	Love on the Run	Colette Tazzi	François Truffaut	Also co-writer
1979	French Postcards	Madame Catherine Tessier	Willard Huyck	
1979	The Brontë Sisters	Charlotte Brontë	André Téchiné	
1979	The French Atlantic Affair	Lisa	Douglas Heyes	TV Mini-Series
1980	The Lady Banker	Colette Lecoudray	Francis Girod	
1980	Scruples	Valentine O'Neill	Alan J. Levi	TV Mini-Series
1981	The Hot Touch	Dr. Simpson	Roger Vadim	Nominated - Genie Award for Best Performance by a Foreign Actress
1981	Chanel Solitaire	Coco Chanel	George Kaczender	
1981	44 ou les récits de la nuit		Moumen Smihi	
1982	Ace of Aces	Gaby Delcourt	Gérard Oury	
1982	The Magic Mountain	Claudia Chauchat	Hans W. Geißendörfer	
1982	Boulevard des assassins	Hélène Mariani	Boramy Tioulong	
1983	L'ami de Vincent	Milena	Pierre Granier-Deferre	
1983	Le prix du danger	Laurence Ballard	Yves Boisset	
1983	Der Stille Ozean	Florence	Xaver Schwarzenberger	TV movie
1983	Le crime de Pierre Lacaze	Colette Ribert	Jean Delannoy	TV movie
1985	Parking	Claude Perséphone	Jacques Demy	
1985	Miss Right	BeBe	Paul Williams	
1985	Les Nanas	Christine	Annick Lanoë	
1986	L'inconnue de Vienne	Florence	Bernard Stora	TV movie
1986–1987	Le Tiroir secret	Nathalie Duthilleul	Michel Boisrond, Édouard Molinaro, ...	TV Mini-Series
1988	The Abyss	Martha	André Delvaux	
1989	Olympe de nos amours	Olympe	Serge Moati	TV movie
1991	La note bleue	George Sand	Andrzej Żuławski	
1992	Une maman dans la ville	Sabine	Miguel Courtois	TV movie
1994	Seven Sundays	Marion	Jean-Charles Tacchella	
1994	Pourquoi maman est dans mon lit?	Véronique	Patrick Malakian	
1994	Printemps de feu	Caroline Clairval	Claude Boissol	TV movie
1994	La couleur du mensonge	Alice	Hugues de Laugardière	TV movie
1995	La fidèle infidèle	Claire	Jean-Louis Benoît	TV movie
1996	Notre homme	Violaine	Élisabeth Rappeneau	TV movie
1997	Marion	Audrey	Manuel Poirier	
1997	La vérité est un vilain défaut	Monique	Jean-Paul Salomé	TV movie
1998	The Ice Rink	Producer	Jean-Philippe Toussaint	
1998	Les marmottes	Marie-Claire	Jean-Denis Robert & Daniel Vigne	TV Mini-Series
1999	Why Not Me?	Irene	Stéphane Giusti	
1999	Time Regained	Madame Verdurin	Raúl Ruiz	
1999	Les boeuf-carottes	Judge Roesh	Claude-Michel Rome	TV series (1 episode)
2000	Love Torn in a Dream	Mother	Raúl Ruiz	
2000	Sur un air d'autoroute	Dr. Rouget	Thierry Boscheron	
2000	Un jeune Français	Léna	Michel Sibra	TV movie
2001	Inch'Allah Dimanche	Madame Manant	Yamina Benguigui	
2002	Comme un avion	Claire Forestier	Marie-France Pisier	
2004	Ordo	Louise's mother	Laurence Ferreira Barbosa	
2005	Vénus & Apollon	Madame Pommerand	Pascal Lahmani	TV series (3 episodes)
2006	Paid	Gislaine	Laurence Lamers	
2006	Dans Paris	The mother	Christophe Honoré	
2006	Pardonnez-moi	Lola	Maïwenn	
2006	Un ami parfait	The widow	Francis Girod	
2006	Les enfants, j'adore!	Jacqueline	Didier Albert	TV movie
2007	Dombais et fils	Cléopâtre	Laurent Jaoui	TV movie
2008	Miroir, mon beau miroir	Marie-Line	Serge Meynard	TV movie
2008	Clara Sheller	Iris	Alain Berliner	TV series (1 episode)
2009	Paradis criminel	Anne Lermercier	Serge Meynard	TV movie
2009	Revivre	Léa Goldenberg	Haim Bouzaglo	TV Mini-Series
2010	Bacon on the Side	Nicole Lacroix	Anne Depétrini	
2010	Le chasseur	Natacha Delaunay	Nicolas Cuche	TV Mini-Series

=== Filmmaker ===
Year	Title	Notes
1974	Celine and Julie Go Boating	As a writer
1979	Love on the Run	As a writer
1990	Le bal du gouverneur	As a director & writer
2002	Comme un avion	As a director & writer

== Theater ==
Year	Title	Author	Director
1993	Ce qui arrive et ce qu'on attend	Jean-Marie Besset	Patrice Kerbrat
1995	Le Pain dur & Le Père humilié	Paul Claudel	Marcel Maréchal
2002	Liaison transatlantique	Fabrice Rozié	Sandrine Dumas
2005	Chère Maître	Peter Eyre	Sandrine Dumas
2005	Liaison transatlantique	Fabrice Rozié	Sandrine Dumas
2006	N'écoutez pas, mesdames !	Sacha Guitry	Patrice Kerbrat
2007–2009	Le Nouveau Testament	Sacha Guitry	Daniel Benoin
2009	Other People's Money	Jerry Sterner	Daniel Benoin
2009–2010	In Search of Lost Time	Marcel Proust	Marie-France Pisier

== Author ==
Year	Book	Publisher
1984	Le Bal du gouverneur	Éditions Grasset
1986	Je n'ai aimé que vous	Éditions Grasset
1992	La Belle Imposture	Éditions Grasset
1997	Le Deuil du printemps	Éditions Grasset
