= Lazar Lagin =

Soviet author

- Born: Lazar Iosifovich Ginzburg; December 4, 1903; Vitebsk, Russian Empire
- Died: June 16, 1979 (aged 75); Moscow, RSFSR, Soviet Union

Lazar Iosifovich Lagin (Russian: Ла́зарь Ио́сифович Лагин), real name Lazar Ginzburg (4 December 1903, Vitebsk – 16 June 1979, Moscow), was a Soviet author of children's and science fiction books.

== Career ==
Lagin is best known for his ever-popular book Starik Hottabych (Старик Хоттабыч, Old Man Hottabych, 1938), a fairy tale telling the story of a genie who is freed from captivity by a Soviet schoolboy. The genie, as is to be expected, has some trouble in adapting to modern life values and technological development. The book was recommended to school libraries by Ministry of general and professional education of Russian Federation; it was made into the film Old Khottabych in 1956.

Lagin's science fiction novels are set in imaginary Western "capitalist" countries and satirize misuse of scientific inventions in bourgeois society. His novella Major Well Andyou (Майор Велл Эндъю) is a satiric sequel to H. G. Wells' The War of the Worlds.

Lagin was also a screenplay writer, producing, for instance, the screenplay for the 1967 animation film Passion of Spies.

== In English ==
- The Old Genie Hottabych, foreign language publishing house, 1950.
- The Old Genie Hottabych, Fredonia Books, 2001.

== In Hindi ==
- Beeswin sadi ka jinn. New Delhi, Rajkamal Publications. Translated by famous Hindi writer Kamleshwar.
