= Gilles Pisier =

French mathematician

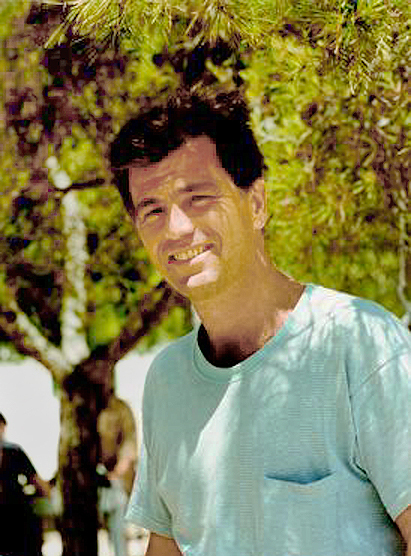
- Born: 18 November 1950 (age 75); Nouméa, New Caledonia
- Education: Paris Diderot University
- Known for: Contributions to functional analysis, probability theory, harmonic analysis, operator theory
- Relatives: Marie-France Pisier (sister); Évelyne Pisier (sister)
- Awards: Ostrowski Prize (1997); Salem Prize (1979)
- Scientific career
- Fields: Mathematics
- Workplaces: Pierre and Marie Curie University, Texas A&M University
- Doctoral advisor: Laurent Schwartz

Gilles I. Pisier (born 18 November 1950) is a professor of mathematics at the Pierre and Marie Curie University and a distinguished professor and A.G. and M.E. Owen Chair of Mathematics at the Texas A&M University. He is known for his contributions to several fields of mathematics, including functional analysis, probability theory, harmonic analysis, and operator theory. He has also made fundamental contributions to the theory of C*-algebras. Gilles is the younger brother of French actress Marie-France Pisier.

== Research ==
Pisier has obtained many fundamental results in various parts of mathematical analysis.

=== Geometry of Banach spaces ===
In the "local theory of Banach spaces", Pisier and Bernard Maurey developed the theory of Rademacher type, following its use in probability theory by J. Hoffman–Jorgensen and in the characterization of Hilbert spaces among Banach spaces by S. Kwapień. Using probability in vector spaces, Pisier proved that super-reflexive Banach spaces can be renormed with the modulus of uniform convexity having "power type". His work (with Per Enflo and Joram Lindenstrauss) on the "three–space problem" influenced the work on quasi–normed spaces by Nigel Kalton.

=== Operator theory ===
Pisier transformed the area of operator spaces. In the 1990s, he solved two long-standing open problems. In the theory of C*-algebras, he solved, jointly with Marius Junge, the problem of the uniqueness of C* -norms on the tensor product of two copies of B(H), the bounded linear operators on a Hilbert space H. He and Junge were able to produce two such tensor norms that are nonequivalent. In 1997, he constructed an operator that was polynomially bounded but not similar to a contraction, answering a famous question of Paul Halmos.

== Awards ==
He was an invited speaker at the 1983 ICM and a plenary speaker at the 1998 ICM. In 1997, Pisier received the Ostrowski Prize for this work. He is also a recipient of the Grands Prix de l'Académie des Sciences de Paris in 1992 and the Salem Prize in 1979. In 2012 he became a fellow of the American Mathematical Society.

== Books ==
Pisier has authored several books and monographs in the fields of functional analysis, harmonic analysis, and operator theory. Among them are:

- Pisier, Gilles (1989). The volume of convex bodies and Banach space geometry. Cambridge: Cambridge University Press. ISBN 0-521-36465-5. OCLC 19130153.
- Pisier, Gilles (25 August 2003). Introduction to Operator Space Theory. Cambridge University Press. doi:10.1017/cbo9781107360235. ISBN 978-0-521-81165-1.
- Pisier, Gilles (1996). The operator Hilbert space OH, complex interpolation and tensor norms. Providence, Rhode Island. ISBN 978-1-4704-0170-2. OCLC 891396783.
- Pisier, Gilles; Conference Board of the Mathematical Sciences (1986). Factorization of linear operators and geometry of Banach spaces. Providence, R.I.: Published for the Conference Board of the Mathematical Sciences by the American Mathematical Society. ISBN 0-8218-0710-2. OCLC 12419949.
- Pisier, Gilles (1996). "Similarity Problems and Completely Bounded Maps". Lecture Notes in Mathematics. Vol. 1618. Berlin, Heidelberg: Springer Berlin Heidelberg. doi:10.1007/978-3-662-21537-1. ISBN 978-3-540-60322-1. ISSN 0075-8434.
- Marcus, Michael B.; Pisier, Gilles (31 December 1982). Random Fourier Series with Applications to Harmonic Analysis. (AM-101). Princeton University Press. doi:10.1515/9781400881536. ISBN 978-1-4008-8153-6.

== See also ==
- Pisier–Ringrose inequality
