= Bernard Kouchner =

French politician and doctor (born 1939)

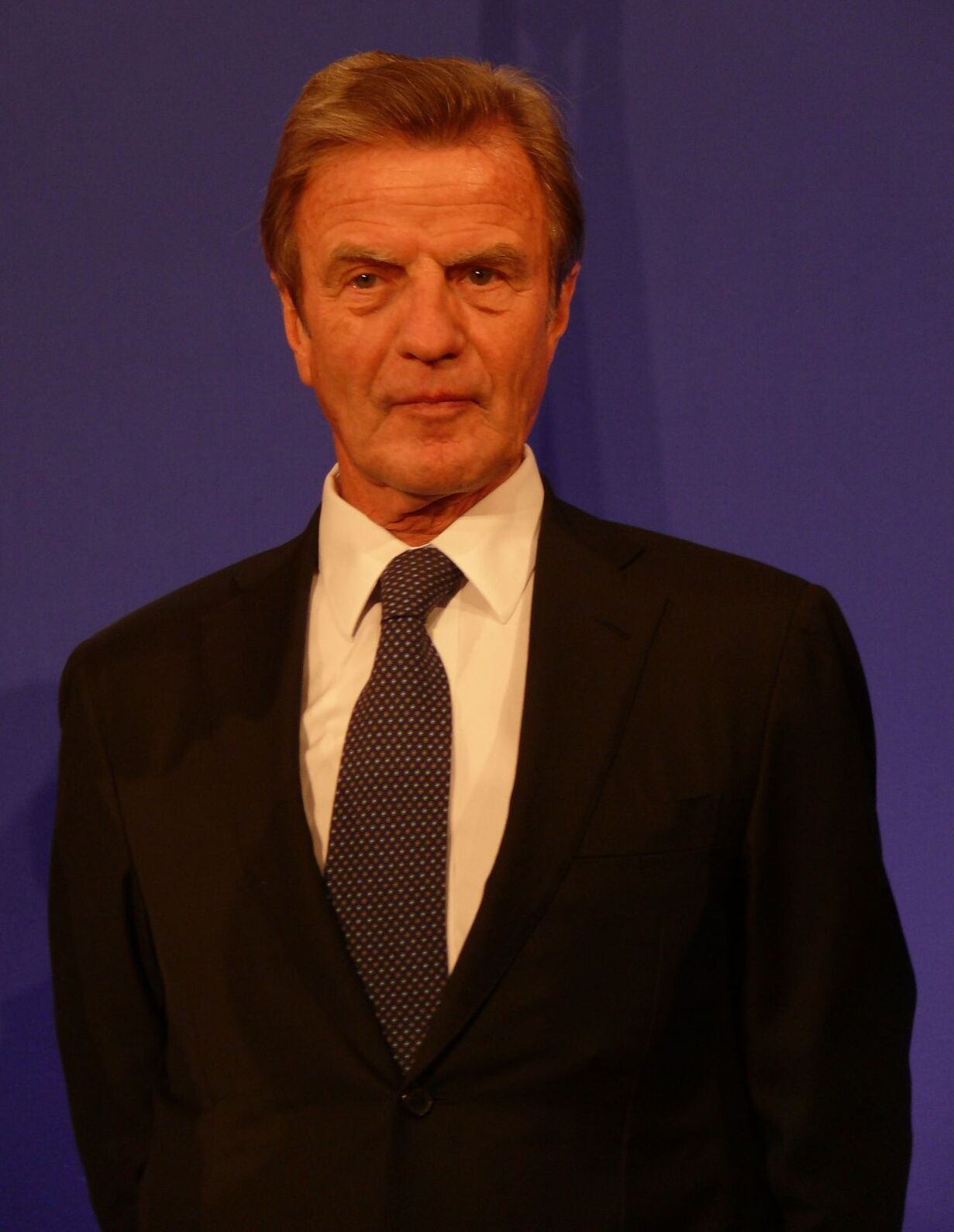

Minister of Foreign and European Affairs
- In office 17 May 2007 – 13 November 2010
- Prime Minister: François Fillon
- Preceded by: Philippe Douste-Blazy (Foreign and European Affairs)
- Succeeded by: Michèle Alliot-Marie

1st Special Representative of the Secretary-General for Kosovo
- In office 15 July 1999 – 12 January 2001
- Preceded by: Sérgio Vieira de Mello
- Succeeded by: Hans Hækkerup

Minister of Health
- In office 2 April 1992 – 29 March 1993
- Prime Minister: Pierre Bérégovoy
- Preceded by: Claude Evin
- Succeeded by: Simone Veil

Personal details
- Born: 1 November 1939 (age 87) Avignon, France
- Party: Independent (2007–present)
- Other political affiliations: PCF (before 1966); PS (1966–2007)
- Spouse(s): Évelyne Pisier; Christine Ockrent
- Children: 4, including Camille
- Education: University of Paris
- Profession: Physician

Bernard Kouchner (French: [bɛʁnaʁ kuʃnɛʁ]; born 1 November 1939) is a French politician and doctor. He is the co-founder of Médecins Sans Frontières (MSF) and Médecins du Monde. From 2007 until 2010, he was the French Minister of Foreign and European Affairs in the center-right Fillon government under president Nicolas Sarkozy, although he had been in the past a minister in socialist governments and was himself a long-term member of the Socialist Party. 2010, The Jerusalem Post considered Kouchner the 15th most influential Jew in the world. Since 2015 Kouchner is workstream leader for the AMU (Agency for the Modernisation of Ukraine), where he contributes his expertise in healthcare.

== Early life ==
Kouchner was born in Avignon, to a Jewish father and a Protestant mother. Kouchner's paternal grandparents were Russian-born Jews who escaped the pogroms by immigrating to France, but perished decades later in Auschwitz.

== Career ==
Kouchner began his political career as a member of the French Communist Party (PCF), from which he was expelled in 1966 for attempting to overthrow the leadership. On a visit to Cuba in 1964, Kouchner spent the night fishing and drinking with Fidel Castro. In the protests of May 1968, he ran the medical faculty strike committee at the Sorbonne.

=== Co-Founder of Médecins Sans Frontières and Médecins du Monde ===
Kouchner worked as a physician for the Red Cross in Biafra in 1968 (during the Nigerian Civil War). His experience as a physician for the Red Cross led him to co-found Médecins Sans Frontières (Doctors Without Borders) in 1971, and then, due to a conflict of opinion with MSF chairman Claude Malhuret, he established Doctors of the World ('Médecins du Monde') in 1980. Kouchner worked as a humanitarian volunteer during the Siege of Naba'a refugee camp in Lebanon in East Beirut during the Lebanese Civil War taking risks that "other foreign aid workers weren't, even worked closely with the Shia cleric Imam Musa al-Sadr".

=== Career in government ===
From 1988, Kouchner began his government career in Socialist governments, though he was not always a member of the Socialist Party (PS). He became "Secrétaire d'état", a lower position in the Cabinet, for Humanitarian Action in 1988 in the Michel Rocard cabinet, then Minister of Health under Pierre Bérégovoy in 1992, during Mitterrand's presidency.

=== Member of the European Parliament, 1994–1997 ===
Kouchner continued his political career in the European Parliament from 1994 to 1997. During the time, he chaired the Committee on Development and Cooperation and served on the Subcommittee on Human Rights. In addition to his committee assignments, he was a member of the Parliament's delegation for relations with the People's Republic of China.

Together with Judge Andrée Ruffo, Kouchner established the International Bureau for Children's Rights (IBCR), a non-governmental organization based in Montreal, in 1994.

=== Minister of Health, 1997–1999 ===
When Lionel Jospin became Prime Minister in 1997, Kouchner became Minister of Health for the second time. He held the office until 1999.

=== UN Representative in Kosovo, 1999–2001 ===
On 15 July 1999, pursuant to Security Council Resolution 1244, UN Secretary General Kofi Annan nominated Kouchner as the second UN Special Representative and Head of the United Nations Interim Administration Mission in Kosovo (UNMIK). During 18 months, he led UN efforts to create a new civil administration and political system replacing the Serbian ones, and to rebuild the economy shattered by the Kosovo War. Thus, municipal councils were elected at local level by the end of 2000. He was replaced on 21 January 2001 by Danish Social Democrat Hans Hækkerup. Later, he was awarded an honorary doctorate by the University of Pristina for his services to Kosovo.

=== Minister of Health, 2001–2002 ===
Kouchner became at this time Minister of Health for the third time, until the 2002 elections.

=== Candidate for UN positions ===
In 2005, Kouchner was a candidate for the position of United Nations High Commissioner for Refugees (UNHCR), but lost the appointment in favor of former Portuguese Prime Minister, António Guterres, who was nominated by then-UN Secretary-General Kofi Annan.

In 2006, Kouchner was also a candidate to become Director-General of the World Health Organization. He lost before the final election round, and (Hong Kong) Chinese candidate Margaret Chan was later elected.

In 2007, the European Commission appointed Kouchner as its representative on the International Independent Group of Eminent Persons (IIGEP), a group of individuals nominated by international donor countries and the government of Sri Lanka, vested with a wide mandate to observe all investigations and inquiries conducted by and on behalf of the Commission of Inquiry into alleged human rights abuses in Sri Lanka.

=== Minister of Foreign Affairs, 2007–2010 ===
After the election of Nicolas Sarkozy as President of France in 2007, Kouchner was appointed Minister of Foreign Affairs in Prime Minister François Fillon's government, even though Kouchner supported Sarkozy's Socialist rival Ségolène Royal during the campaign. He has since been expelled from the Socialist Party for his acceptance of the post.

Kouchner was dismissed in the November 2010 Fillon cabinet reshuffle.

== Political positions ==
=== On the U.S.-led invasion of Iraq ===
Kouchner is a longtime advocate of humanitarian intervention. In early 2003, he pronounced himself in favour of removing Saddam Hussein as President of Iraq, arguing that interference against dictatorship should be a global priority, and continued to say that now, the focus should be on the actual people themselves, and that they are the only ones who could answer yes or no to war.

In a 4 February 2003 editorial with Antoine Veil in Le Monde, entitled "Neither War Nor Saddam", Kouchner said that he was opposed to the impending War in Iraq, and, as the title suggests, to the remaining in power of Saddam Hussein, the removal of whom should be accomplished via a concerted UN, preferably diplomatic, solution. He later became a fierce critic of how the occupation was subsequently conducted.

=== On Europe ===
Kouchner is a well-known pro-European. He supported the ratification of the Lisbon Treaty when it was threatened to be rejected by the Irish in referendum. In the run up to the referendum in the Republic of Ireland on the ratification of the Treaty of Lisbon, Kouchner warned that any "No" vote towards the treaty would be detrimental to Ireland and the Irish economy. He also commented that "It would be very, very awkward if we were not able to count on the Irish, who have often counted on Europe". His comments were dismissed as "unhelpful" by leading Irish politicians, and some media commentators have suggested that his remarks may have galvanised the "No" campaign in the run up to the rejection of the Lisbon Treaty on 13 June 2008.

In 2012, Kouchner co-signed the George Soros call for a strengthening of the European prerogatives as an answer to the eurozone crisis.

=== Comments on Iran nuclear situation ===
In September 2007, Kouchner's public comments on the Iranian nuclear situation attracted much attention and controversy. In an interview on 16 September 2007, he said, "We will negotiate until the end. And at the same time we must prepare ourselves [...] for the worst...The worst, it's war". He stated that France was committed to a diplomatic resolution and that no military action was planned, but that an Iranian nuclear weapon would pose "a real danger for the whole world". Iranian officials criticized the comments as "inflammatory". The chief UN nuclear inspector Mohamed ElBaradei, the head of the International Atomic Energy Agency indirectly responded to Kouchner by characterizing talk of attacking Iran as "hype", saying the use of force should only be considered as a last resort and only if authorized by the UN Security Council.

"I would not talk about any use of force", he said. On 18 September 2007, Kouchner attempted to respond to criticisms. In comments to newspaper Le Monde, he stated, "I do not want it to be said that I am a warmonger! [...] My message was a message of peace, of seriousness and of determination. [...] The worst situation would be war. To avoid that, the French attitude is to negotiate, negotiate, negotiate, without fear of being rebuffed, and to work with our European friends on credible sanctions."

=== Comments on a unity government for Zimbabwe ===
On 1 July 2008, France assumed the presidency of the Council of the European Union. In his capacity as the French foreign minister, he commented after the African Union summit, that the European Union would only recognise a Zimbabwe unity government headed by Morgan Tsvangirai not Robert Mugabe.

=== Use of condoms to prevent AIDS in Africa ===
Kouchner denounced statements by Pope Benedict XVI claiming that condoms promoted AIDS, saying they were "the opposite of tolerance and understanding".

== Life after politics ==
After leaving politics, Kouchner took on a variety of positions, including the following:

- American University of Kurdistan (AUK), Member of the Board of Trustees
- Aurora Prize, Member of the Selection Committee (since 2017)
- Devex, Member of the Board of Advisors
- Echo Foundation, Member of the International Board of Advisors
- European Council on Foreign Relations (ECFR), Member
- Fondation Agir Contre l'Exclusion (FACE), Member of the Board
- International Campaign for Tibet (ICT), Member of the International Council of Advisors
- Toledo International Centre for Peace (CITpax), Member of the Advisory Council

== Personal life ==
Kouchner has three children (Julien, Camille and Antoine) by his first wife, Évelyne Pisier, a law professor, and one child, Alexandre, by his present wife Christine Ockrent, a TV anchor and author.

== Honours ==
- Golden Plate Award of the American Academy of Achievement (2005)
- Knight of Freedom Award (2011)
- Victor Gollancz Prize (2014) in recognition of his "lifelong, unwavering commitment to fight crimes against humanity"
- Honorary Knight Commander of The Most Excellent Order of the British Empire

Political offices
Preceded by Claude Evin	Minister of Health; 1992–1993	Succeeded by Simone Veil
Preceded by Philippe Douste-Blazy as Minister of Foreign Affairs	Minister of Foreign and European Affairs; 2007–2010	Succeeded by Michèle Alliot-Marie
Preceded by Dimitrij Rupel	President of the Council of the European Union; 2008	Succeeded by Karel Schwarzenberg
