= Olivier Duhamel =

French former university professor and politician (born 1950)

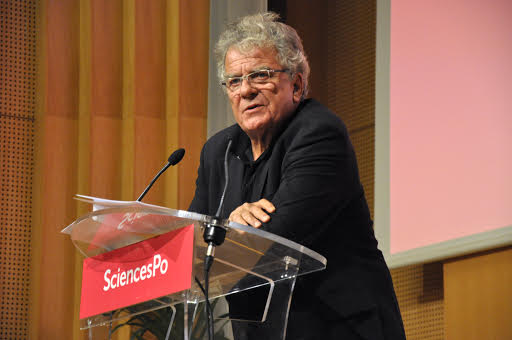

President of the Fondation Nationale des Sciences Politiques
- In office 10 May 2016 – 4 January 2021
- Preceded by: Jean-Claude Casanova
- Succeeded by: Laurence Bertrand Dorléac

Member of the European Parliament
- In office 1997–2004
- Preceded by: Pierre Moscovici

Personal details
- Born: 2 May 1950 (age 76) Neuilly-sur-Seine, France
- Spouse: Évelyne Pisier
- Education: Paris Nanterre University

Olivier Duhamel (French: [dyamɛl]; born 2 May 1950) is a French former university professor and politician. As a member of the social-democratic Socialist Party, he was elected as a member of the European Parliament from 1997 to 2004. In 2021 he resigned from the FNSP and his academic position after being accused of the sexual abuse of a minor.

== Biography ==
Olivier Duhamel was born on 2 May 1950 in Neuilly-sur-Seine, France, the son of politician Jacques Duhamel.

He has taught at the University of Franche-Comté, Paris West University Nanterre La Défense, and the Université Paris 1 Panthéon-Sorbonne. He was also a visiting professor at the University of Washington and New York University. He is a faculty member of Sciences Po, though he stopped teaching in 2010.

He was an advisor to the Constitutional Council from 1983 to 1995, and to Georges Vedel in 1993 and Édouard Balladur in 2007. He served as MEP from 1997 to 2004.

He writes in the popular press for La Marseillaise and Valeurs Actuelles. He is the co-founder and editor-in-chief of another publication, POUVOIRS. He is an editor for the European Constitutional Law Review. He also appears on France Culture, LCI, and Europe 1.

He is the Vice-President of Le Siècle. He is also a member of the Club des Juristes, a legal think tank in France.

=== Accusation of incest and child abuse ===
In January 2021, he was accused by his stepdaughter Camille Kouchner in a book titled La Familia Grande of sexually abusing her twin brother, Duhamel's stepson, when he was 13 in 1988: this offence is outside the statute of limitation for criminal charges. He subsequently resigned from the FNSP, his academic, and media posts. Saying “Being the subject of personal attacks, and eager to protect the institutions I work for, I resign from [all of my positions]." The allegations against him are said to have sparked an online movement of people speaking out about family abuse, and to have led to new laws toughening sexual assault laws against minors. On 5 January 2021, Paris prosecutors opened an investigation into the allegations. In mid-April 2021, French media, citing sources close to the investigation, reported that Duhamel had admitted to sexually abusing his stepson.

== Bibliography ==
- Chili ou la Tentative, Révolution/Légalité (Gallimard,1974)
- La Gauche et la Cinquième République (PUF, 1980)
- Dictionnaire des œuvres politiques (co-edited with François Châtelet and Évelyne Pisier, PUF, 1986)
- Dictionnaire constitutionnel (co-edited with Yves Mény, PUF, 1991)
- Las Democracias (co-edited with Manuel Cepeda, TM editors, Bogota)
- Démocratie, démocraties (co-edited with Robert Darnton, Éditions du Rocher, 1999)
- Le quinquennat (Presses de Sciences Po, 2000, 2008)
- Vive la VI^{e} République (Seuil, 2002)
- Pour l'Europe - Le texte intégral de la Constitution expliqué et commenté (Seuil, 2003)
- Histoire des présidentielles (Seuil, 2007)
- Le starkozysme (co-written with Michel Field, Seuil, 2008)
- Droit constitutionnel et institutions politiques (Seuil, 2009)
- Histoire de la V^{e} République (1958–2009) (co-written with Guy Carcassonne and Jean-Jacques Chevallier, Dalloz, 2009).
