= Évelyne Pisier =

French political scientist

- Born: 18 October 1941; Hanoi, French Indochina
- Died: 9 February 2017 (aged 75); Toulon, France
- Education: Panthéon-Assas University
- Occupation: Political scientist
- Spouse(s): Bernard Kouchner; Olivier Duhamel
- Children: 3, including Camille Kouchner
- Relatives: Marie-France Pisier (sister); Gilles Pisier (brother)

Évelyne Pisier (18 October 1941 – 9 February 2017) was a French writer and political scientist.

== Biography ==
Pisier was born in Hanoi on 18 October 1941. She was the daughter of a French senior civil servant, Georges Pisier (30 June 1910 – 13 March 1986), who was a Maurrassien supporter of the Vichy regime and was stationed in Hanoi. Pisier was interned for four years in a Japanese concentration camp after the Japanese invasion of French Indochina. She then moved to Nouméa, where her father was transferred and where her brother Gilles Pisier was born. Her parents subsequently separated, so Évelyne Pisier settled in Nice with her mother and her sister, future actress and director Marie-France Pisier. In 1986 her father committed suicide, and then in 1988 her mother also committed suicide at the age of 64.

In 1964, as a feminist activist involved with the political left, she traveled with other students, including Marcel-Francis Kahn (fr), to Cuba where she started a 4-year relationship with Fidel Castro. She subsequently married Bernard Kouchner, with whom she had three children.

While continuing her activism, Pisier defended her thesis in public law in 1970 at the University of Paris II Panthéon-Assas. Her thesis, entitled Le service public dans la théorie de l'État de Léon Duguit (The role of public service in Léon Duguit's theory of the state), was completed under the supervision of Georges Lavau (fr). Pisier then became one of the first women in the Agrégation, and in 1972 she was appointed to the Institut d'études politiques.

Pisier subsequently had a second marriage with the French political scientist Olivier Duhamel, with whom she adopted two children; she recounted these experiences in her 2005 book Une question d'âge (A question of age). In 1989, she was named the director of the French Government's Book and Reading Service (fr) within the French Ministry of Culture, with a term lasting until 1993.

In 1994, Pisier became a professor emerita at the University of Paris 1 Pantheon-Sorbonne. Pisier died on 9 February 2017 in Sanary-sur-Mer.

== Selected awards ==
- Chevalier, French Legion of Honour (1998)
- Commandeur, French Ordre des Arts et des Lettres
