= List of awards and nominations received by Catherine Deneuve =

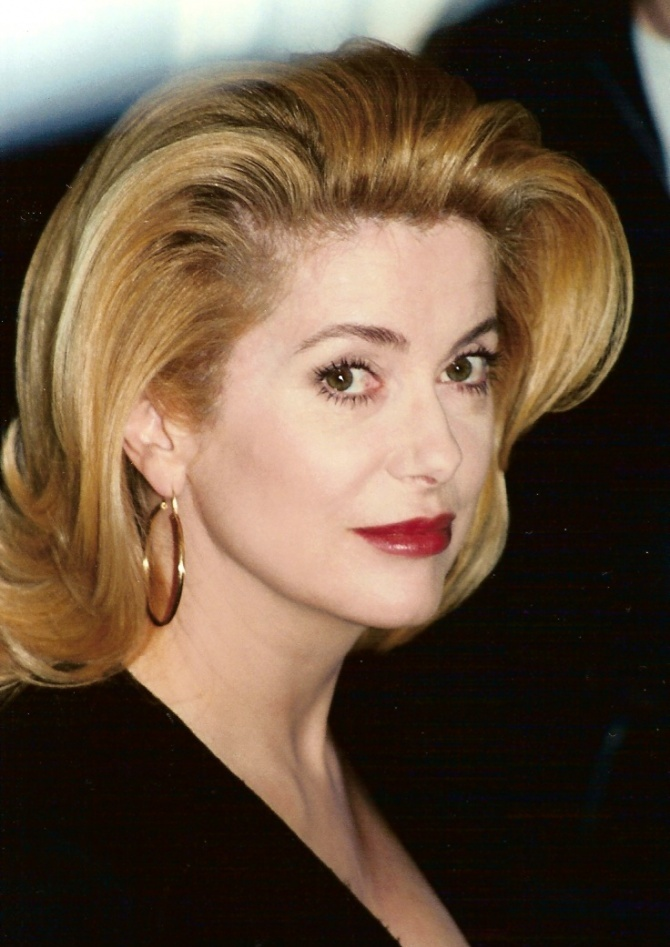
Catherine Deneuve in 1995

This article is a list of awards and nominations received by Catherine Deneuve.

Catherine Deneuve is a French actress who has received numerous accolades including two César Award for Best Actress for her performances in The Last Metro (1980), and Indochine (1992). She received nominations for an Academy Award for Best Actress for Indochine and a BAFTA Award for Best Actress for Belle de Jour (1968). She received the Venice Film Festival's Volpi Cup for Best Actress for her role in Place Vendôme (1998). She also received numerous honorary accolades including the Berlin International Film Festival's Golden Bear in 1998 and the Venice Film Festival's Golden Lion in 2022.

== Major associations ==
=== Academy Awards ===
Year	Category	Nominated work	Result	Ref.
1992	Best Actress	Indochine	Nominated	

=== BAFTA Awards ===
Year	Category	Nominated work	Result	Ref.
1968	Best Actress	Belle de Jour	Nominated	

=== César Awards ===
Year	Category	Nominated work	Result	Ref.
1976	Best Actress	Le Sauvage	Nominated	
1981	Best Actress	Le Dernier métro	Won	
1982	Best Actress	Hôtel des Amériques	Nominated	
1988	Best Actress	Agent trouble	Nominated	
1989	Best Actress	Drôle d'endroit pour une rencontre	Nominated	
1993	Best Actress	Indochine	Won	
1994	Best Actress	Ma saison préférée	Nominated	
1997	Best Actress	Les Voleurs	Nominated	
1999	Best Actress	Place Vendôme	Nominated	
2006	Best Supporting Actress	Palais Royal!	Nominated	
2011	Best Actress	Potiche	Nominated	
2014	Best Actress	On My Way	Nominated	
2015	Best Actress	In the Courtyard	Nominated	
2016	Best Actress	La Tête haute	Nominated	

== Miscellaneous accolades ==
=== Other awards ===
Year	Group	Award	Title	Result
1965	NYFCC Award	Best Actress	Repulsion	3rd Place
1976	Bambi Award	Film International	Lovers Like Us	Won
1981	David di Donatello	Best Foreign Actress	The Last Metro	Won
1993	WIFTI Award	Crystal Award – International	Herself	Won
1994	Goldene Kamera	Best International Actress	My Favorite Season	Won
1995	San Sebastián IFF Award	Donostia Award	Herself	Won
1997	Moscow IFF Award	Silver St. George	Herself	Won
1998	Venice FF Award	Volpi Cup – Best Actress	Place Vendôme	Won
1998	Berlin IFF Award	Honorary Golden Bear	Herself	Won
2000	AFF Award	Actor's Mission Award	Herself	Won
2001	Bambi Award	Film International	East/West	Won
2001	Bambi Award	Film International	I'm Going Home	Won
2001	Bambi Award	Film International	Dancer in the Dark	Won
2001	Satellite Award	Best Supporting Actress – Drama	Dancer in the Dark	Nominated
2002	Berlin IFF Award	Silver Berlin Bear	8 Women (shared with cast)	Won
2002	EFA Award	Best Actress	8 Women (shared with cast)	Won
2005	Cannes IFF Award	Palme d'Or d'honneur	Herself	Won
2006	Bangkok IFF Award	Golden Kinnaree Award	Herself	Won
2006	Istanbul IFF Award	Cinema Honorary Award	Herself	Won
2008	Cannes IFF Award	Special Jury Award (shared with Clint Eastwood)	Herself	Won
2008	Satellite Award	Best Actress – Motion Picture	A Christmas Tale	Nominated
2009	Globes de Cristal Award	Best Actress	A Christmas Tale	Nominated
2011	Lumière Awards	Best Actress	Potiche	Nominated
2012	FSLC Award	Gala Tribute	Herself	Won
2012	Lumière Awards	Best Actress	Beloved	Nominated
2012	Manaki Brothers FF Award	Special Golden Camera 300	Herself	Won
2012	Moscow International FF	Stanislavsky Award	Herself	Won
2013	Cabourg Film Festival	Coup de Cœur	On My Way	Won
2013	Lumière Awards	Best Actress	On My Way	Nominated
2015	Filmfest Hamburg	Douglas-Sirk-Award	Herself	Won
2016	Lumière Festival	Lumière Award	Herself	Won
2018	Globes de Cristal Award	Best Actress	The Midwife	Nominated
2022	Venice IFF Awards	Golden Lion Honorary Award	Herself	Won

== Honorary awards ==
In 1998, she was honored for her lifetime achievement at the 23rd Cairo International Film Festival. In 2000, a Golden Palm Star on the Palm Springs, California, Walk of Stars was dedicated to her. In 2013, she was honored for her lifetime achievement at the 26th European Film Awards. In 2015, she received the Lifetime Achievement Golden Orange Award from International Antalya Film Festival, Turkey. In 2020, The New York Times ranked her number 21 in its list of the 25 Greatest Actors of the 21st Century., received Praemium Imperiale(2018)
