= Michèle Moretti =

French actress (born 1940)

- Born: 15 March 1940 (age 86); Paris, France
- Occupation: Actress
- Years active: 1961–present

Michèle Moretti (born 15 March 1940 in Paris, France) is a French actress. She has appeared in more than one hundred films since 1961.

== Theater ==
Year	Title	Author	Director	Notes
1961–63	L'Aboyeuse et l'automate	Gabriel Cousin	Jacques Lecoq	Théâtre de l'Athénée
1965	Les Bargasses	Marc'O	Marc'O	Théâtre Édouard VII
1966	Les Idoles	Marc'O	Marc'O (2)	Bobino
1967	L'Opéra noir	Gabriel Cousin	Gabriel Garran	Théâtre de la Commune
1968	Demain une fenêtre sur rue	Jean-Claude Grumberg	Marcel Cuvelier	Théâtre de l'Alliance française
1969	Un chantage au théâtre	Dacia Maraini	André Téchiné	Théâtre des Mathurins
1970	The Death of Bessie Smith	Edward Albee	Jean-Marie Serreau	Théâtre du Midi
1971	La Nuit des assassins	José Triana	Roger Blin	Théâtre Récamier
1971	Allo ! c'est toi Pierrot ?	Pierre Louki	Roland Monod	Théâtre Hébertot
1972	Comédie policière	Javier Arroyuelo & Rafaël Lopez Sanchez	Alfredo Arias	Théâtre national de Chaillot
1972	Donna Mobil	Claude Prey	Roger Kahane	Festival d'Avignon
1975	Le triangle frappe encore	Marc'O	Marc'O (3)	Théâtre national de Chaillot
1982	Leçons de bonheur	Liliane Atlan	Liliane Atlan	Jardin d'hiver Cité Véron
2008	Elle t'attend	Florian Zeller	Florian Zeller	Théâtre de la Madeleine

== Filmography ==
Year	Title	Role	Director	Notes
1961	La reine Margot	Gillonne	René Lucot	TV movie
1967	L'espagnol		Jean Prat	TV movie
1968	Les idoles	Madame Canasson	Marc'O	
1969	L'Amour fou	Michèle	Jacques Rivette	
1969	Paulina Is Leaving	The nurse	André Téchiné	
1969	Sept jours ailleurs	Michèle	Marin Karmitz	
1969	Le Jouet criminel	The running woman	Adolfo Arrieta	Short
1969	Café du square	Various	Louis Daquin	TV series (5 episodes)
1971	Out 1 : Noli me tangere	Lili	Suzanne Schiffman & Jacques Rivette (2)	
1971	Les stances à Sophie	Phyllis	Moshé Mizrahi	
1972	Out 1 : Spectre	Lili	Jacques Rivette (3)	
1972	What a Flash !		Jean-Michel Barjol	
1972	Figaro-ci, Figaro-là	Madame Goetzman	Hervé Bromberger	TV movie
1973	A Slightly Pregnant Man	Ginou	Jacques Demy	
1973	La soeur du cadre	The sister	Jean-Claude Biette	Short
1974	Cave canem	The woman	Jean-Louis Berdot	Short
1974	Quai de l'étrangleur	Claudie Courmayer	Yves-André Hubert	TV movie
1975	French Provincial	Pierrette	André Téchiné (2)	
1975	Les intrigues de Sylvia Couski		Adolfo Arrieta (2)	
1975	L'ortie	Angèle's mother	Roger Kahane	TV movie
1975	Mourir pour Copernic	The prostitute	Bernard Sobel	TV movie
1976	Andréa	The antiquarian	Henri Glaeser	
1978	L'exercice du pouvoir	Rachel Sartène-Bast	Philippe Galland	
1978	Messieurs les jurés		Boramy Tioulong	TV series (1 episode)
1980	Le petit théâtre d'Antenne 2	Madame Ducrest	Franck Andron	TV series (1 episode)
1980	Papa Poule	Madame Gerbert	Roger Kahane (2)	TV series (1 episode)
1980	Les amours des années folles	Pascualine	Boramy Tioulong (2)	TV series (1 episode)
1981	Les Uns et les Autres		Claude Lelouch	
1982	Elle voit des nains partout !	Fairy Melusine	Jean-Claude Sussfeld	
1982	Le quart d'heure américain	Sophie	Philippe Galland (2)	
1982	Boulevard des assassins	Catherine Vernier	Boramy Tioulong (3)	
1982	A propos du travail	The graphologist	Jean Eustache	TV movie
1982	Il n'y a plus d'innocents	Claire	Jean Prat (2)	TV movie
1982	Cinéma 16	Café's owner	Boramy Tioulong (4)	TV series (1 episode)
1983	Le démon dans l'île	Lisa	Francis Leroi	
1983	Tout le monde peut se tromper	Marie-Rose Taropol	Jean Couturier	
1983	Hughie		Frédéric Compain	TV movie
1984	La Garce	The redhead	Christine Pascal	
1984	L'agenda	Katia	Geneviève Bastid, Michèle Gard & Patrick Volson	TV movie
1985	Rendez-vous	Daisy	André Téchiné (3)	
1985	Le mariage du siècle	Alexandra	Philippe Galland (3)	
1986	Le goûter chez Niels		Didier Martiny	Short
1986	Lili, petit à petit	Madame Mercier	Philippe Galardi	TV series (1 episode)
1988	Loft story	Minouchka	Boramy Tioulong (5)	TV series (1 episode)
1991	I Don't Kiss	Drama teacher	André Téchiné (4)	
1991	Navarro	Doctor Lebreton	Gérard Marx & Patrick Jamain	TV series (2 episodes)
1992	À demain		Didier Martiny (2)	
1992	Julie Lescaut	The school director	Caroline Huppert	TV series (1 episode)
1993	My Favorite Season	The director	André Téchiné (5)	
1993	Colis d'oseille		Yves Lafaye	TV movie
1994	Wild Reeds	Madame Alvarez	André Téchiné (6)	Nominated - César Award for Best Supporting Actress
1994	Les Cordier, juge et flic	Marlène	Alain Bonnot	TV series (1 episode)
1994	Tous les garçons et les filles de leur âge...	Madame Alvarez	André Téchiné (7)	TV series (1 episode)
1995	Maigret	Juliette	Pierre Granier-Deferre	TV series (1 episode)
1995	L'instit	Madeleine	Philippe Triboit	TV series (1 episode)
1995	Le R.I.F.	Sylvie Sauvageon	Roger Guillot	TV series (1 episode)
1996	Loin des yeux	Louise	Christian Faure	TV movie
1996	Antoine	Madame Rivière	Jérôme Foulon	TV movie
1996	L'année du certif	Mademoiselle Rachel	Jacques Renard	TV movie
1996	Petit	Mademoiselle Robin	Patrick Volson (2)	TV movie
1997	Autre chose à foutre qu'aimer	Marguerite	Carole Giacobbi	
1997	L'histoire du samedi	Martine	Stéphane Bertin	TV series (1 episode)
1998	White Lies	Jeanne's mother	Pierre Salvadori	
1998	Une si jolie mariée	Martine	Jacques Audoir	TV movie
1999	Superlove	Simone Rosin	Jean-Claude Janer	
1999	À vot' service	ANPE's employee	Caroline Sarrion	
1999	Trois ponts sur la rivière	Madame Plume	Jean-Claude Biette (2)	
1999	Je vois déjà le titre	The mother	Martial Fougeron	Short
1999	Trois saisons	Angèle	Edwin Baily	TV movie
1999	Crimes en série	Suzanna Donguen	Patrick Dewolf	TV series (1 episode)
1999	Un homme en colère	Bernadette Gauthier	Dominique Tabuteau	TV series (1 episode)
2000	Les marchands de sable	Annick	Pierre Salvadori (2)	
2000	Une femme neuve	Colette	Didier Albert	TV movie
2000	Le détour	Annick	Pierre Salvadori (3)	TV movie
2001	Tomorrow	Tina Onofri	Francesca Archibugi	
2001	L'autre monde	Aldjia	Merzak Allouache	
2001	A Hell of a Day	The bus passenger	Marion Vernoux	
2001	Une voix d'homme	The mother	Martial Fougeron (2)	Short
2001	Une femme amoureuse	Lucie	Jérôme Foulon (2)	TV movie
2002	L'héritière	Madame Destrac	Bernard Rapp	TV movie
2002	On n'a plus de sushis à se faire	Nini	Philippe Venault	TV movie
2003	Who Killed Bambi ?	Madame Vachon	Gilles Marchand	
2003	After You...	Martine	Pierre Salvadori (4)	
2003	7 ans de mariage	Audrey's mother	Didier Bourdon	
2003	Saltimbank	Florence	Jean-Claude Biette (3)	
2004	Look at Me	Édith	Agnès Jaoui	
2004	La nuit du meurtre	Hélène Castellane	Serge Meynard	TV movie
2005	Merci, les enfants vont bien !	Madeleine	Stéphane Clavier	TV series (2 episodes)
2006	Mon fils à moi	The headmaster	Martial Fougeron (3)	
2006	Le zoographe	The woman	Jean-Claude Monod	Short
2006	Petits meurtres en famille	Albertine	Edwin Baily (2)	TV mini-series
2006	Marion Jourdan	Marion's mother	Jean-Marc Seban	TV series (1 episode)
2007	The Witnesses		André Téchiné (8)	
2008	Mark of an Angel	Colette	Safy Nebbou	
2008	Miroir, mon beau miroir	Gus's neighbor	Serge Meynard (2)	TV movie
2008	Cellule identité	Madame Champain	Stéphane Kappes	TV series (1 episode)
2008-11	Hard	Louise	Cathy Verney	TV series (8 episodes)
2009	Valérie n'est plus ici	Frédérique Sainteure	Pascal Cervo	Short
2010	The Names of Love	Annette Martin	Michel Leclerc	
2010	Histoires de vies		Valérie Minetto	TV series (1 episode)
2011	Declaration of War	Geneviève	Valérie Donzelli	
2011	The Conquest	Bernadette Chirac	Xavier Durringer	
2011	Iris in Bloom	Jean's mother	Valérie Mréjen & Bertrand Schefer	
2011	Victoire Bonnot	Mamy Mira	Vincent Giovanni	TV series (1 episode)
2012	Pauline détective	Mademoiselle Blanchot	Marc Fitoussi	
2012	La baie d'Alger	Suzanne	Merzak Allouache (2)	TV movie
2012	Un crime oublié	Jacqueline	Patrick Volson (3)	TV movie
2013	Je suis supporter du Standard	The mother	Riton Liebman	
2013	Une chanson pour ma mère	The mother	Joel Franka	
2013	Monsieur lapin	The director	Pascal Cervo (2)	Short
2013	Ma vie au grand air	Gaby Borel	Nicolas Herdt	TV movie
2014	In the Courtyard	Colette	Pierre Salvadori (5)	
2014	Number One Fan	Nicole	Jeanne Herry	
2014	Pitchipoï	Zocha	Charles Najman	
2014	Changement de cap	Madeleine Legrand	Nicolas Herdt (2)	TV movie
2015	The Roommates Party	Françoise Dubreuil	Alexandra Leclère	
2015	Mes amis, mes amours, mes emmerdes	Nicky	Christophe Douchand & Nicolas Herdt (3)	TV series (8 episodes)
2016	Five	Madame Simon	Igor Gotesman	
2016	Lebowitz contre Lebowitz	Mouna	Christophe Barraud & Frédéric Berthe	TV series (5 episodes)
2017	Sales Gosses	Mireille	Frédéric Quiring	
2017	Chouquette	Jacqueline	Patrick Godeau	
2018	Brillantissime		Michèle Laroque	
2018	Les Bonnes Intentions	Jacqueline	Gilles Legrand	
