= Unforgivable (2011 film) =

- Theatrical release poster
- French: Impardonnables
- Directed by: André Téchiné
- Written by: André Téchiné; Mehdi Ben Attia
- Produced by: Saïd Ben Saïd
- Starring: André Dussolier; Carole Bouquet; Adriana Asti
- Cinematography: Julien Hirsch
- Edited by: Hervé de Luze
- Music by: Max Richter
- Production companies: MS; CRG International; France 3 Cinéma
- Distributed by: UGC Distribution
- Release date: 17 August 2011
- Running time: 111 minutes
- Country: France
- Languages: French; Italian
- Budget: €7.5 million
- Box office: €1.3 million

Unforgivable (French: Impardonnables) is a 2011 French drama film directed by André Téchiné, starring André Dussollier, Carole Bouquet, and Mélanie Thierry. The film is an adaptation of Philippe Djian's novel Unforgivable which received the Jean Freustié award in 2009. It was previously called The Angels Terminus. The film premiered at the Directors' Fortnight at the 2011 Cannes film festival.

== Plot ==
Francis, an aging successful writer of crime novels, arrives in Venice where he plans to rent out an apartment to live in peace and quiet for the next year while writing a new novel. Through his search he meets Judith, a real estate agent, who insists on showing him a house accessible only by boat on the island of Sant'Erasmo. Francis is smitten with Judith, a beautiful ex-model about 20 years his junior, and acquiesces to rent the property if she moves in with him.

Eighteen months later, Francis and Judith are blissfully married and living together in Sant'Erasmo. However happiness is not conducive for him to write. Suffering from writer's block, he roams the streets and canals of Venice in search of inspiration. Alice, his adult daughter from a previous marriage, comes to visit towing along her ten-year-old daughter, Vicky. Alice, no longer with the father of her daughter, is an aimless aspiring actress. She goes swimming with Judith, takes a few strokes in the opposite direction and disappears without explanation. Vicky, abandoned by Alice, is picked up by Roger, her father. Alarmed, Francis hires Anna Maria, a vodka-swilling private detective, who many years ago had a lesbian relationship with Judith. Alice is found to be having a passionate love affair with Alvise, a penniless aristocrat and small-time heroin dealer.

Months pass and Francis is still suffering from writer's block. His relationship with Judith is severely strained as she is distracted by her work demands of the peak season. He becomes jealous and begins to question Judith's fidelity. Before they met, she had many affairs with people from both sexes. Francis decides to have her followed by Jérémie, Anna Maria's son, a troubled young man who has just been released from prison. This transgression causes Judith to have sex with the young man when she realizes what is happening. As the relationship with her husband deteriorates, Judith decides to leave Sant'Erasmo and moves back to Venice. Francis accepts the situation with trepidation.

During the autumn, Jérémie is attacked by a gay man who kills his beloved dog as retaliation. Jérémie had previously thrown his attacker into a canal. Francis harshly criticized Jérémie for his behaviour. Shortly after Jérémie slashes his wrist in a suicide attempt, but he is saved by Francis. Anna Maria returns from Paris with news about Alice who sent her father a disturbing video of herself having sex with Alvise. Anna Maria has been diagnosed with terminal lung cancer. In the winter Alice returns to Venice, as Alvise is now in prison in the city. She is welcomed by Judith, and Francis and Alice make amends. She asks her father for forgiveness but is adamant in her love for Alvise and tells Francis that her daughter is better off with her ex-husband.

At Anna Maria's funeral, Jérémie is repeatedly hit by Francis who is furious about his lack of feelings towards Anna Maria. The two men reconcile when Jérémie, leaving Venice to find a new life, comes to say goodbye to Francis. He is young, he says, and at least time is on his side. Francis finally manages to complete his novel. He has no more reasons to stay in Venice. He runs to see Judith and he asks her to move to Paris with him.

== Cast ==
- André Dussollier as Francis
- Carole Bouquet as Judith
- Adriana Asti as Anna Maria
- Mauro Conte as Jérémie
- Mélanie Thierry as Alice
- Andrea Pergolesi as Alvise
- Zoé Duthion as Vicky
- Sandra Toffolatti as The Countess
- Alexis Loret as Roger

== Reception ==
The film garnered a favorable critical reaction. As of June 2020, the film hols a 77% approval rating Rotten Tomatoes, based on 35 reviews with an average rating of 6.71 out of 10. Metacritic gave the film an average score of 66/100, indicating "generally favorable reviews".

Ty Burr, writing for The Boston Globe, called the film: "An elegantly rambling Franco-Italian affair about the ways we do each other wrong while trying to do each other right…. Unforgivable is about doubt, the gnawing gap between the things we crave and our inability to own them." In The New York Times, Manohla Dargis commented: "Unforgivable isn't one of Mr. Téchiné's greatest achievements, but it's engrossing even when its increasingly populated story falters, tripped up by unpersuasive actions, connections and details."

Roger Ebert said that: "What makes the film involving is that it doesn't depend on the mechanical resolution of the plot, but on the close observation of its effects on these distinctive characters. Like all movies set in Venice, Unforgivable derives much of its effect from the city itself, which acts as a stage set for the lives lived there. By placing Andre's island both within the city and apart from it, it underlines his own isolation from these busy lives that have intersected with his. Nothing ever seems straightforward in Venice, least of all its romances."

In the words of Mick LaSalle writing for the San Francisco Chronicle, "the film creates the lived-in sense of being in the world of the characters. Thing happen. The story goes one way and then another. We care, but not much, not really. And yet we do start to care, as if simply as a result of proximity. We are there with these people, or at least we feel we are, which is the ultimate movie illusion…... Unforgivable is like a conversation with a stranger, but a real conversation - with the additional pleasure of Venice in every shot."

The Christian Science Monitor's film critic Peter Rainer said that director "André Téchiné makes movies about people whose lives are perpetually in flux – the more fluctuations the better. In the human comedy, Téchiné seems to be saying, to his delight, nothing stays the same. Here is something exasperating and yet marvelous about Téchiné's approach, and this dichotomy is no more apparent than in his latest film, Unforgivable, which is about a best-selling crime novelist whose personal life is as messy as his books are carefully plotted."
