= Paulina Is Leaving =

Paulina is Leaving
- Theatrical release poster
- Directed by: André Téchiné
- Written by: André Téchiné
- Produced by: Pierre Neurrisse
- Starring: Bulle Ogier; Marie-France Pisier
- Cinematography: Jean Gonnet; William Glenn
- Production companies: Fabienne Tzanck; Roland Prandini
- Distributed by: Télé Hachette
- Release dates: 2 September 1969 (Venice Film Festival); 12 March 1975 (France)
- Running time: 90 minutes
- Country: France
- Language: French
- Box office: $70.500

Paulina is Leaving (French: Paulina s'en va) is a 1969 French drama film written and directed by André Téchiné, starring Bulle Ogier and Marie-France Pisier. It marked Téchiné's debut as a director. It remains Téchiné's less known film, since it was only very briefly released to theaters in 1975, six years after its premiered at the Venice Film Festival. It has neither rereleased nor ever transferred to video.

The title refers to Paulina leaving both the household she shared with her brothers and the world of sanity. The film was partially inspired by Jean Pierre Melville’s 1950 adaptation of Jean Cocteau’s Les Enfants Terribles.

== Plot ==
Paulina leaves the apartment where she lives with her two brothers, Nicolas and Olivier. Her departure is marked by chaotic and sometimes violent confrontations. In a café, she meets a mysterious stranger who works in a nearby psychiatric clinic. There, she is introduced by a nurse and made to answer a questionnaire which she views on a cinema screen, the words printed on a purple background.

Meanwhile, a civil conflict seems to be raging, with checkpoints, sounds of shooting and the reappearance of Nicholas in chains. He is allowed to visit Paulina at the clinic but is carted off the next day as a deserter, having told Paulina that Oliver has left for the forest to join a rebel group. Paulina is then sold by the clinic to a brothel, which is the only functioning institution and extant building in the town and which is presided over by Hortense, a former opera singer, and the old uncle. Here Paulina is subjected to endless philosophizing by the uncle in a room containing a massive globe of the world, and is encouraged by Hortense to participate in a cocktail party, which she refuses.

Paulina meets up again with Nicholas in a ruined town, but is then seen looking for Hortense again, only to be driven off through the forest by a mysterious man.

== Cast ==
- Bulle Ogier as Paulina
- Marie-France Pisier as Isabelle
- Laura Betti as Hortense
- Yves Beneyton as Nicolas
- Michèle Moretti as The nurse
- André Julien as Old uncle
- Denis Berry as Olivier

== Production ==
Paulina s'en va (Paulina is Leaving) (1969) is Téchiné's first film as director. Initially conceived as a short, it was later expanded to a feature-length film. It was made with a shoe string budget and shot in two periods, over one week in 1967 and two weeks in 1969.

== Release ==
The film premiered at the Venice Film Festival. With its experimental nature, Paulina s'en va disconcerted audiences and was not actually released until 1975, when it had a brief run in a movie theater alongside Téchiné's second film: French Provincial.

The film remains an obscure title since it has not been available for viewing and was never released on video.
