= Rendez-vous (1985 film) =

- Theatrical release poster
- Directed by: André Téchiné
- Written by: André Téchiné; Olivier Assayas
- Produced by: Alain Terzian
- Starring: Juliette Binoche; Lambert Wilson; Jean-Louis Trintignant
- Cinematography: Renato Berta
- Edited by: Martine Giordano
- Music by: Philippe Sarde
- Distributed by: UGC Distribution
- Release date: 1985
- Running time: 83 minutes
- Country: France
- Language: French
- Box office: $5.8 million

Rendez-vous (English: Appointment) is a 1985 French erotic drama film directed by André Téchiné. The film stars Juliette Binoche, Lambert Wilson, Wadeck Stanczak and Jean-Louis Trintignant. Rendez-vous premiered at the 1985 Cannes Film Festival where it won the award for Best Director. The film had a total of 766,811 admissions in France.

== Plot ==
Nina is a young headstrong woman who has traveled to Paris from her provincial home in Toulouse searching immediate success as an actress. Tired of one-night stands and sharing quarters with others, she sets out to find her own apartment, stopping in to a realtor's office. There, she meets Paulot, a timid real estate clerk, who is immediately smitten by her. She invites him to see her perform in the small role she has as a maid in a boulevard comedy.

After the play, Nina takes Paulot for dinner with her current boyfriend Fred, but the couple has a major row, breaking off their relationship. Paulot invites Nina to stay at his apartment while she finds her own place, but his roommate, Quentin, refuses to let her stay. They have to settle for a hotel room for the night. In their long walk through the city, she tells Paulot that she has had sex with nearly every man she has encountered. She complains to him that she is tired of being used solely for easy sex and asks him to leave her alone.

Quentin, however, has followed them to the hotel: he forces his attentions on Nina. Nina and Quentin then begin an intense and violent liaison. An actor who performs in a live sex show version of Romeo and Juliet, Quentin is unpredictable and provocative. Nina bounces between the two vastly different men: the gentle Paulot and the dangerous and intense Quentin. Nina has an approach/avoidance conflict with Quentin, all the while fending off offers by Paulot to take care of her. When he finds that she has had sex with Quentin, Paulot starts to change his calm manners towards Nina, but he does not lose his craving for her.

Quentin is run over and killed by a car, in what seems to be a suicide. The only other person attending his funeral is the elderly theater director, Scrutzler, who eventually explains that in London he had cast Quentin as Romeo, but Quentin had withdrawn after he survived a suicide pact with Scrutzler's daughter, with whom he had a passionate love affair.

During casting of Romeo and Juliet, Scrutzler recognizes Nina among the aspiring actresses for the role and cast her as Juliet. Full of self-doubt and fear, stimulated by the ghost-like appearances of the dead Quentin, Nina prepares for the role and copes with Paulot's advances. They share an apartment, but have settled for a platonic relationship. However, Paulot is still in love with Nina and is jealous of Scrutzler's interest on her. Paulot confronts Scrutzler, but in spite of the director's assurance that his interest in her is only of a paternal nature, Paulot leaves Nina.

Nina struggles to rehearse her role as Juliet in the forthcoming play but, after Paulot leaves her, realizes that he is the one she is really in love with. Nina goes to his work looking for him and entices him to have sex with her. They have sex for the first time, in a violent and degrading coupling. Nina then insists in going for a long nocturnal walk, like the one they had the first time they met. She gives him a ticket for the coming opening night of Romeo and Juliet, but after he leaves her, Paulot tears up the ticket, reaffirming his decision to break away from her.

Nina, nervously preparing for her entrance, suffers stage fright. Scrutzler calms her down, but then leaves for London, deciding she must continue on her own. As the film ends, Nina is left alone in the stage wings. The play is about to start...

== Cast ==
- Juliette Binoche as Nina
- Lambert Wilson as Quentin
- Wadeck Stanczak as Paulot
- Jean-Louis Trintignant as Scrutzler
- Dominique Lavanant as Gertrude
- Michèle Moretti as Daisy
- Jean-Louis Vitrac as Fred
- Anne Wiazemsky as Administrator

== Themes ==
Rendez-vous is examination of love and sexual desire from the point of view of three emotionally scarred young people. The film is a lyrical exploration of love and loss, reality and fantasy.

== Production ==
In 2023 Juliette Binoche said she was shocked during the scene where Nina is sleeping and Quentin and Paulot, played by Lambert Wilson and Wadeck Stanczak, put their hands between her legs.
