= Philippe Sarde =

French composer

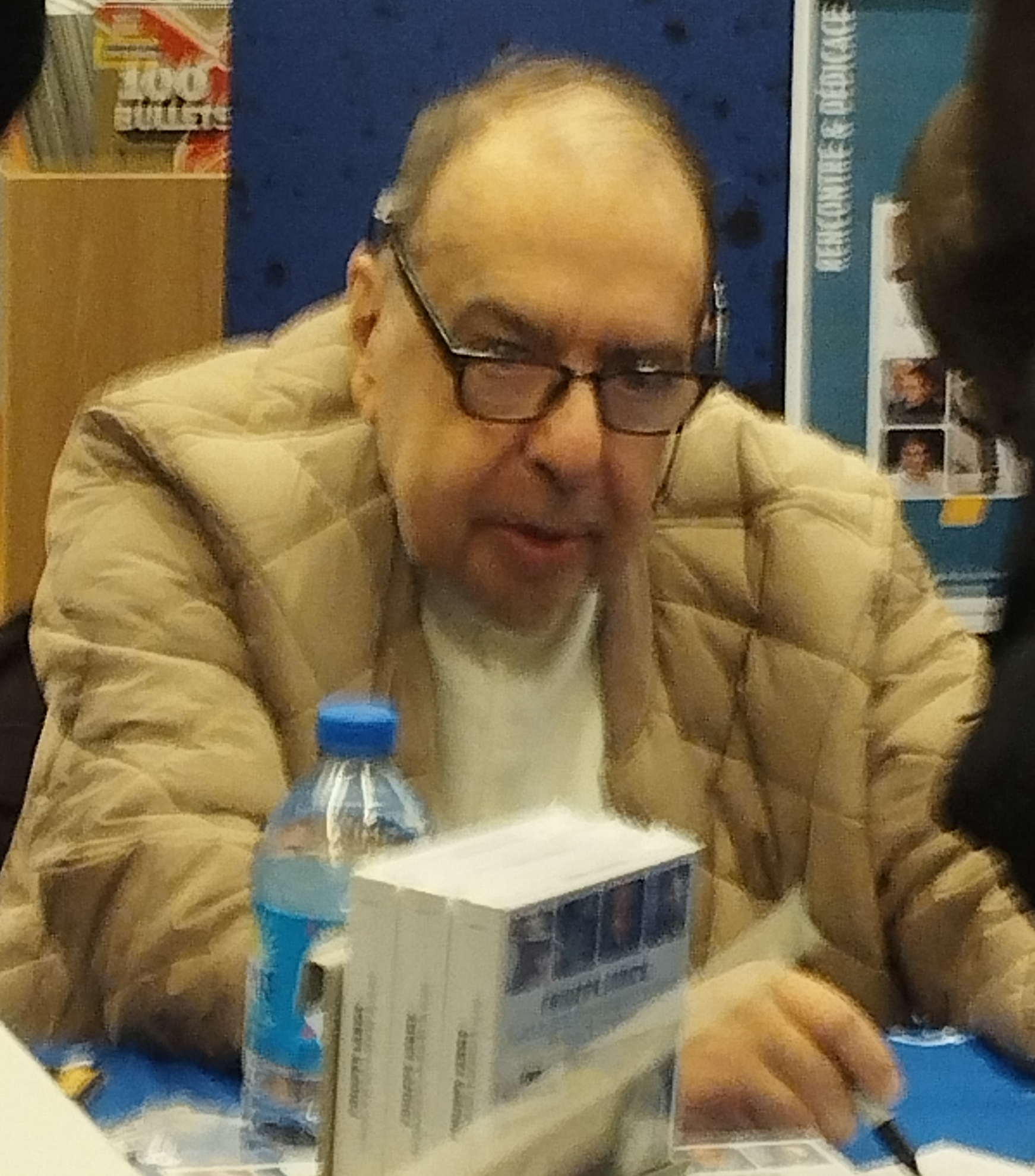
- Sarde in 2022

Background information
- Born: 21 June 1948 (age 78); Hauts-de-Seine, Île-de-France, France
- Genre: Film score
- Occupation: Composer
- Years active: 1970–present

Philippe Sarde (born 21 June 1948) is a French film composer. Considered among the most versatile and talented French film composers of his generation, Sarde has scored over two hundred films, film shorts, and television mini-series. He received an Academy Award nomination for Tess (1979), and twelve César Award nominations, winning for Barocco (1976). In 1993, Sarde received the Joseph Plateau Music Award.

== Life and career ==
Philippe Sarde was born 21 June 1948 in Neuilly-sur-Seine, Hauts-de-Seine, Île-de-France, France. His mother, Andrée Gabriel, was a singer in the Paris Opera. Through his mother's encouragement, he became interested in music from the early age of three. When he was four years old, he conducted a brief section of Carmen at the Paris Opera. At the age of five, he began experimenting with sound recording and made his first short films. Sarde loved both music and film, and had trouble deciding on his career direction.

Sarde entered the Paris Conservatory, where he studied harmony, counterpoint, fugue, and composition under Noël Gallon. At the age of seventeen, he directed a short 35-mm film in black and white, for which he composed the music, asking Vladimir Cosma to help him with the orchestration. At the age of eighteen, after writing songs for Régine, Sarde met Claude Sautet, who asked him to write the music for his film The Things of Life (1969). The experience established his career direction and initiated a long partnership with Sautet that spanned twenty-five years and eleven films.

Sarde also established close associations with directors Bertrand Tavernier, Pierre Granier-Deferre, Georges Lautner, André Téchiné, and Jacques Doillon. Sarde also collaborated with Roman Polanski on The Tenant and Tess, which garnered an Academy Award nomination, Bertrand Blier's on Beau-Père, Alain Corneau on Fort Saganne, and Marshall Brickman on Lovesick, The Manhattan Project, and Sister Mary Explains It All. In 1988, Sarde was a member of the jury at the Cannes Film Festival.

Film director Georges Lautner once observed that he was constantly amazed by the composer's ability to find a unique approach to each film that he scored. According to Yuri German, writing in the All Music Guide, Sarde's soundtracks are "masterfully and unconventionally arranged" and are often performed by such world-class musicians as Chet Baker, Stan Getz, Stéphane Grappelli, and Maurice Vander."

In April 1990, Sarde married Nave Florence, but they divorced the following year. In 1994, he married Clotilde Burre. They have two daughters, Ponette (born 1998) and Liza (born 1999). Both are enrolled in the seventeenth arrondissement of Paris. Sarde is the brother of producer Alain Sarde.

== Selected filmography ==
- Sortie de secours (1970)
- The Things of Life (Les choses de la vie) (1970)
- Max et les Ferrailleurs (1971)
- Le Chat (1971)
- Hellé (film) (1972)
- Liza (1972)
- César and Rosalie (1972)
- La Grande Bouffe (1973)
- Deux hommes dans la ville (Two Men in Town) (1973)
- The Train (1973)
- The Heavenly Bodies (Les Corps célestes) - 1973
- La Valise (1973)
- The Clockmaker (L' Horloger de Saint-Paul) (1974)
- Don't Touch the White Woman! (1974)
- Lancelot du Lac (Lancelot of the Lake) (1974)
- Icy Breasts (Les seins de glace) (1974)
- Vincent, François, Paul and the Others (1974)
- The French Detective (1975)
- The Judge and the Assassin (Le juge et l'assassin) (1976)
- The Last Woman (1976)
- The Tenant (1976)
- Barocco (1976)
- The Purple Taxi (Un taxi mauve) (1977)
- The Devil Probably (Le diable probablement) (1977)
- Spoiled Children (Des enfants gâtés) (1977)
- Madame Rosa (La vie devant soi) (1977)
- Le Crabe-tambour (1977)
- Parisian Life (1977)
- Death of a Corrupt Man (Mort d'un pourri) (1977)
- Bye Bye Monkey (1978)
- A Simple Story (Une histoire simple) (1978)
- Le sucre (1978)
- Passe montagne (1978)
- Cop or Hood (1979)
- Seeking Asylum (Chiedo asilo) (1979)
- Tess (1979)
- The Medic (Le Toubib) (1979)
- Buffet froid (1979)
- The Woman Cop (La Femme flic) (1980)
- Le Guignolo (1980)
- Tales of Ordinary Madness (1981)
- Beau-père (1981)
- Birgitt Haas Must Be Killed (1981)
- Coup de Torchon (1981)
- The Boy Soldier (1981)
- Hotel America (Hôtel des Amériques) (1981)
- Ghost Story (1981)
- Le Choix des armes (1981)
- Quest for Fire (La Guerre du feu) (1981)
- Strange Affair (1981 film) (1981)
- L'Étoile du Nord (1982)
- Le Choc (1982)
- A Captain's Honor (L'Honneur d'un capitaine) (1982)
- The Story of Piera (1983)
- I Married a Dead Man (1983)
- Lovesick (1983)
- My Other Husband (1983)
- A Friend of Vincent (1983)
- First Desires (1983)
- Fort Saganne (1984)
- Rendez-vous (1985)
- Joshua Then and Now (1985)
- L'homme aux yeux d'argent (1985)
- Harem (1985)
- My Brother-in-Law Killed My Sister (1986)
- Pirates (1986)
- Scene of the Crime (Le Lieu du crime) (1986)
- The Manhattan Project (1986)
- Private Tuition (1986)
- Every Time We Say Goodbye (1986)
- State of Grace (1986)
- Quelques jours avec moi (A Few Days with Me) (1988)
- The Bear (L'Ours) (1988)
- Lost Angels (1989)
- Reunion (L' Ami Retrouvé) (1989)
- Music Box (1989)
- Lord of the Flies (1990)
- The Little Gangster (Le Petit Criminel) (1990)
- Eve of Destruction (1991)
- The Old Lady Who Walked in the Sea (1991)
- I Don't Kiss (J'embrasse pas) (1991)
- L.627 (1992)
- The Little Apocalypse (La petite apocalypse) (1993)
- Le Jeune Werther (1993)
- My Favorite Season (Ma saison préférée) (1993)
- Uncovered (1994)
- Revenge of the Musketeers (1994)
- Nelly and Mr. Arnaud (Nelly et Mr. Anaud) (1995)
- Thieves (Les Voleurs) (1996)
- Ponette (1996)
- Lucie Aubrac (1997)
- On Guard (Le Bossu) (1997)
- Alice and Martin (Alice et Martin) (1998)
- Mademoiselle (2001)
- Strayed (Les égarés) (2003)
- Les Sœurs fâchées (2004)
- A Less Bad World (2004)
- Colette, une femme libre (2004) - TV Mini-Series
- The Perfume of the Lady in Black (2005)
- Je m'appelle Élisabeth (2006)
- The Witnesses (Les témoins) (2007)
- The Girl on the Train (La Fille du RER) (2009)
- The Princess of Montpensier (2010)
- The Matchmaker (2010)
- Streamfield, les carnets noirs (2010)

== Awards and nominations ==
- 1977 César Award for Best Music for Barocco (1976) Won
- 1977 César Award Nomination for Best Music for The Judge and the Assassin (1976)
- 1978 César Award Nomination for Best Music for Le Crabe-Tambour (1977)
- 1979 César Award Nomination for Best Music for A Simple Story (1978)
- 1980 César Award Nomination for Best Music for Tess (1979)
- 1981 Academy Award Nomination for Best Music, Original Score for Tess (1979)
- 1982 César Award Nomination for Best Music for Quest for Fire (1981)
- 1986 Genie Award for Best Music Score for Joshua Then and Now (1985)
- 1988 César Award Nomination for Best Music for Les innocents (1987)
- 1993 Joseph Plateau Award Won
- 1995 César Award Nomination for Best Music for La fille de d'Artagnan (1994)
- 1996 César Award Nomination for Best Music for Nelly and Mr. Arnaud (1995)
- 1998 César Award Nomination for Best Music for On Guard (1997)
- 2011 César Award Nomination for Best Music Written for a Film for The Princess of Montpensier (2010)
