= Philippe Djian =

French writer

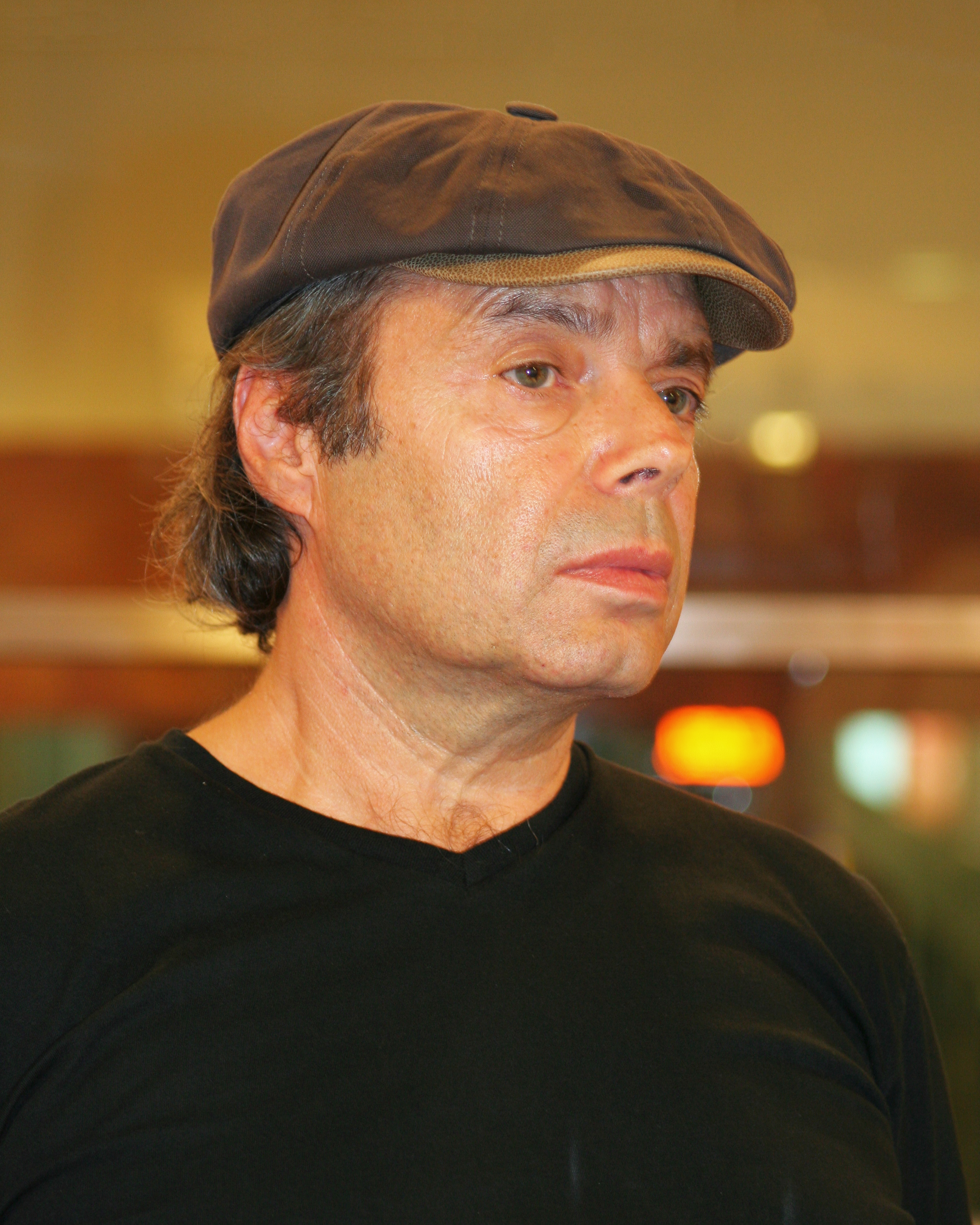
- Philippe Djian in 2009
- Born: 3 June 1949 (age 77); Paris, France
- Education: ESJ Paris
- Occupation: Novelist
- Writing career
- Period: 1981–present
- Notable work: 37°2 le matin
- Notable awards: Prix Interallié (2012)

Philippe Djian (French: [filip dʒjɑ̃]; born 3 June 1949) is a popular French author of Armenian descent. He won the 2012 Prix Interallié for the novel "Oh..." (Elle for the English translation).

== Life and career ==
Djian graduated from the Ecole Supérieure de Journalisme de Paris (ESJ Paris). After a period of wandering and odd jobs, he published a volume of short stories, 50 contre 1 (1981), and then the novels Bleu comme l'enfer (1982) and Zone érogène (1984) before gaining fame with his subsequent novels 37°2 le matin (1985), Maudit Manège (1986), Echine (1988), Crocodiles (short stories) (1989), Lent dehors (1991), Sotos (1993), and Assassins (1994).

Five of his novels have been adapted into films: 37°2 le matin (1986; English title Betty Blue) which was filmed by Jean-Jacques Beineix, Bleu comme l'enfer (1986; English title Blue Hell) directed by Yves Boisset; Impardonnables (2011; English title Unforgivable) directed by André Téchiné; Love Is the Perfect Crime (2013; original title L'Amour est un crime parfait) directed by Arnaud Larrieu and Jean-Marie Larrieu; and Oh... (as Elle (2016) directed by Paul Verhoeven). He also co-wrote the screenplay of Ne fais pas ça (2004) with Luc Bondy.

The TV presenter Antoine De Caunes introduced him to Swiss singer Stephan Eicher. The two men became friends and Djian became the writer of Eicher's lyrics, at least for the songs in French.

Djian frequently moved (from Boston to Florence). Today he lives in Biarritz and, on average, writes a novel every 18 months. With Doggy Bag, written in 2005, he started a literary series with six seasons, inspired by American TV series.

== Awards and honors ==
- 2009 Prix Jean-Freustié for Impardonnables
- 2012 Prix Interallié for "Oh..."

== Bibliography ==
=== Novels ===
- Bleu comme l'enfer (1983; film: Blue Hell)
- Zone érogène (1984)
- 37˚2 le matin (1985; film: Betty Blue)
- Maudit manège (1986)
- Échine (1988)
- Lent dehors (1991)
- Sotos (1993)
- Assassins (1994)
- Criminels (1997)
- Sainte Bob (1998)
- Vers chez les blancs (2000)
- Ça c'est un baiser (2002)
- Frictions (2003)
- Impuretés (2005)
- Doggy bag, saison 1 (2005)
- Doggy bag, saison 2 (2006)
- Doggy bag, saison 3 (2006)
- Doggy bag, saison 4 (2007)
- Doggy bag, saison 5 (2007)
- Doggy bag, saison 6 (2008)
- Impardonnables (2009; film: Unforgivable)
- Incidences (2010 - trans. as Consequences by Bruce Benderson; film: Love is the Perfect Crime)
- Vengeances (2011)
- "Oh…" (Gallimard, 2012 - trans. as Elle by Michael Katims, Other Press 2017; film: Elle)
- Love Song (2013)
- Chéri-Chéri (2014)
- Dispersez-vous, ralliez-vous! (2016)
- Marlène (2017 - trans. as Marlene by Mark Polizzotti)
- A l'aube (2018)
- Les inéquitables (2019)
- 2030 (2020)
- Double Nelson (2021)
- Sans Compter (2023)

=== Short stories ===
- 50 contre 1 (1981)
- Crocodiles (1989)
- Lorsque Lou (1992)
- Contes de Noël (1996)
- Mise en bouche (2003)
