= Love Is the Perfect Crime =

2013 film

- French theatrical release poster
- Directed by: Arnaud Larrieu; Jean-Marie Larrieu
- Screenplay by: Arnaud Larrieu; Jean-Marie Larrieu
- Based on: Incidences by Philippe Djian
- Produced by: Francis Boespflug; Sidonie Dumas; Bruno Pésery
- Starring: Mathieu Amalric; Karin Viard; Maïwenn; Sara Forestier; Denis Podalydès
- Cinematography: Guillaume Deffontaines
- Edited by: Annette Dutertre
- Music by: Caravaggio
- Distributed by: Gaumont
- Release dates: 6 September 2013 (TIFF); 4 October 2013 (Switzerland); 15 January 2014 (France)
- Running time: 111 minutes
- Countries: France; Switzerland
- Language: French
- Box office: $2.9 million

Love Is the Perfect Crime (French: L'Amour est un crime parfait) is a 2013 French-Swiss drama thriller film written and directed by the film-making duo Arnaud and Jean-Marie Larrieu. It was screened in the Special Presentation section at the 2013 Toronto International Film Festival.

== Plot ==
Marc, who shares a remote mountain chalet with his sister, teaches literature at the polytechnic beside the lake in Lausanne and cannot resist his female students. One of them, Barbara, in the morning is found dead in his bed. When she is reported missing, the police open an enquiry and her glamorous young stepmother Anna starts her own investigation. Anna easily seduces the ever-amorous Marc, while he at the same time is unsuccessfully fending off both a sexy young student Annie and his frustrated spinster sister Marianne, who is being wooed by Richard, his head of department. But the police are closing in and Anna may not be what she appears.

== Cast ==
- Mathieu Amalric as Marc
- Karin Viard as Marianne
- Maïwenn as Anna
- Sara Forestier as Annie
- Denis Podalydès as Richard
- Marion Duval as Barbara
- Damien Dorsaz as The young inspector
- Carl von Malaisé as The biker
- Pierre Maillard as M. Marinelli

== Filming ==
Part of the film was shot at the Learning Centre of the École polytechnique fédérale de Lausanne.
