= A Strange Place to Meet =

1988 film

- Directed by: François Dupeyron
- Written by: Gérard Depardieu; Dominique Faysse
- Produced by: Catherine Deneuve
- Starring: Catherine Deneuve; Gérard Depardieu
- Cinematography: Charles Van Damme
- Edited by: Françoise Collin
- Music by: Nicola Piovani
- Distributed by: UGC Distribution
- Release date: 5 October 1988
- Running time: 100 minutes
- Country: France
- Language: French
- Box office: $2.4 million

A Strange Place to Meet (French: Drôle d'endroit pour une rencontre; also titled Strange Place for an Encounter) is a 1988 French romantic drama film directed by François Dupeyron, and starring Catherine Deneuve and Gérard Depardieu.

== Cast ==
- Catherine Deneuve : France
- Gérard Depardieu : Charles
- Nathalie Cardone : Sylvie
- André Wilms : Georges
- Jean-Pierre Sentier : Pierrot
- Dominique Reymond : Mme Martinet

== Production ==
Principal Photography began on 15 February 1988.
