= Catherine Deneuve =

French actress (born 1943)

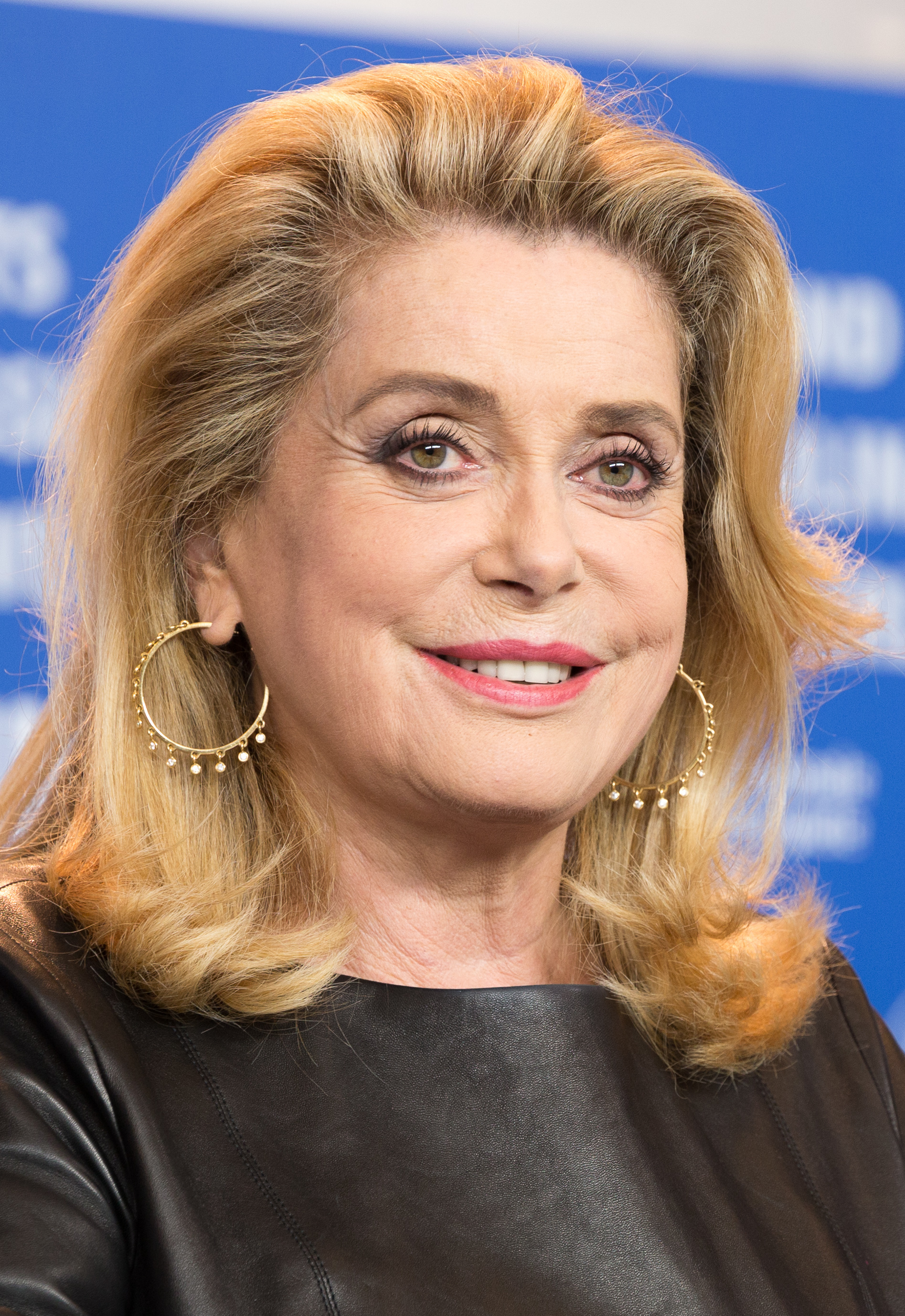
- Deneuve in 2017
- Born: Catherine Fabienne Dorléac; 22 October 1943 (age 83); Paris, France
- Occupation: Actress
- Years active: 1957–present
- Spouse: David Bailey (m. 1965; div. 1972)
- Partner(s): Roger Vadim (1961–1964); Marcello Mastroianni (1970–1974); Hugh Johnson (1982–1983); Pierre Lescure (1984–1991)
- Children: Christian Vadim; Chiara Mastroianni
- Parent(s): Maurice Dorléac; Renée Simonot
- Relatives: Françoise Dorléac (sister)

Catherine Fabienne Dorléac (born 22 October 1943), known professionally as Catherine Deneuve (UK: /dəˈnɜːv/, US: /dəˈnʊv/, French: [katʁin dənœv]), is a French actress. She is considered one of the greatest European actresses on film. In 2020, The New York Times ranked her as one of the greatest actors of the 21st century.

Deneuve made her screen debut in 1957 at age 13, in a film shot the previous year when she was only 12. A major figure of the New Wave, she became, like Brigitte Bardot and Alain Delon, one of the best-known French artists in the world. In a career spanning nearly 70 years, she has played more than a hundred roles and is recognized in France and internationally for being one of the key faces of the musical film genre with appearances in The Umbrellas of Cherbourg, The Young Girls of Rochefort, Donkey Skin, 8 Women and The Beloved. Early in her career, she gained acclaim for her portrayals of aloof and mysterious beauties while working for well-known directors such as Luis Buñuel, François Truffaut, Jacques Demy, Roman Polanski, and Agnès Varda. Her career led her to work in several countries: in the United States, under the direction of Robert Aldrich and Tony Scott; in the United Kingdom, collaborating with Terence Young and Dick Richards; in Italy, with Marco Ferreri, Mauro Bolognini, Sergio Citti, Mario Monicelli and Dino Risi; in Spain, with Luis Buñuel; in Portugal, with Manoel de Oliveira; in Denmark, with Lars von Trier; in Japan, with Eric Khoo; and also in Austria, Russia and Lebanon. In 1985, she succeeded Mireille Mathieu as the official face of Marianne, France's national symbol of liberty.

She has received numerous accolades over her career including a César Award for The Last Metro and the Venice Film Festival's Volpi Cup for Best Actress for Place Vendôme, as well as nominations for an Academy Award for Indochine and a BAFTA Award for Belle de Jour. To English-speaking audiences, Deneuve is best known for The Hunger. Her other notable films include Repulsion, The April Fools, Scene of the Crime and My Favorite Season. She has received honorary awards, including the Berlin International Film Festival's Honorary Golden Bear in 1998, the Cannes Film Festival's Honorary Palme d'Or in 2005, and the Venice Film Festival's Golden Lion for Lifetime Achievement in 2022.

== Early life ==
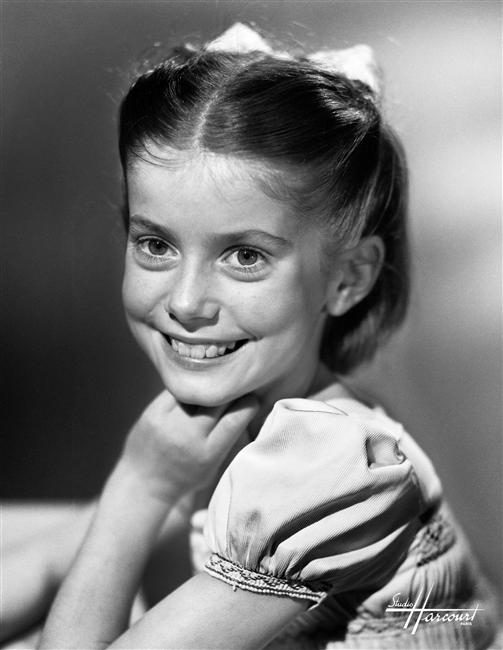
Deneuve in 1952

Deneuve was born Catherine Fabienne Dorléac in Paris, the daughter of French stage actors Maurice Dorléac and Italian-French Renée Simonot. Deneuve had two sisters, Françoise Dorléac (21 March 1942 – 26 June 1967) and Sylvie Dorléac (born 14 December 1946), as well as a maternal half-sister, Danièle, whom their mother had out of wedlock in 1936 with Aimé Clariond. Deneuve used her mother's maiden name, which she chose for her stage name, in order to differentiate herself from her sisters. Deneuve attended Catholic schools.

In 2007, it was revealed in the unauthorized biography Deneuve, l'affranchie (Deneuve, The Emancipated Woman), written by French journalist Bernard Violet, that Deneuve's father collaborated with Radio Paris, a radio station controlled by the Nazis during the German occupation of France in World War II. According to Le Monde and Le Parisien, Dorléac participated in 76 radio broadcasts or plays for the station. He also appeared in two propaganda short films produced for the Milice in 1944. Following the Liberation of France, Dorléac was charged with national indignity in 1945 by the Civic Court of Paris and sentenced to a six-month prohibition on working in theatre and cinema. The biography's allegations about Dorléac's collaborationist activities became a subject of controversy. In a January 2009 interview with The Guardian, Deneuve expressed anger over the portrayal of her father in Violet's biography and announced her intention to sue the book's editor. She said that she wanted to take legal action on her father's behalf and accused the author of inventing facts, although her father's Nazi propaganda works and subsequent charges were backed by public archives and documents. Deneuve also revealed that her lawyer had advised her to postpone legal action because the book had not sold well. However, Deneuve did not sue the author neither the publisher.

== Film career ==
=== 1957–1970: Breakthrough and acclaim ===
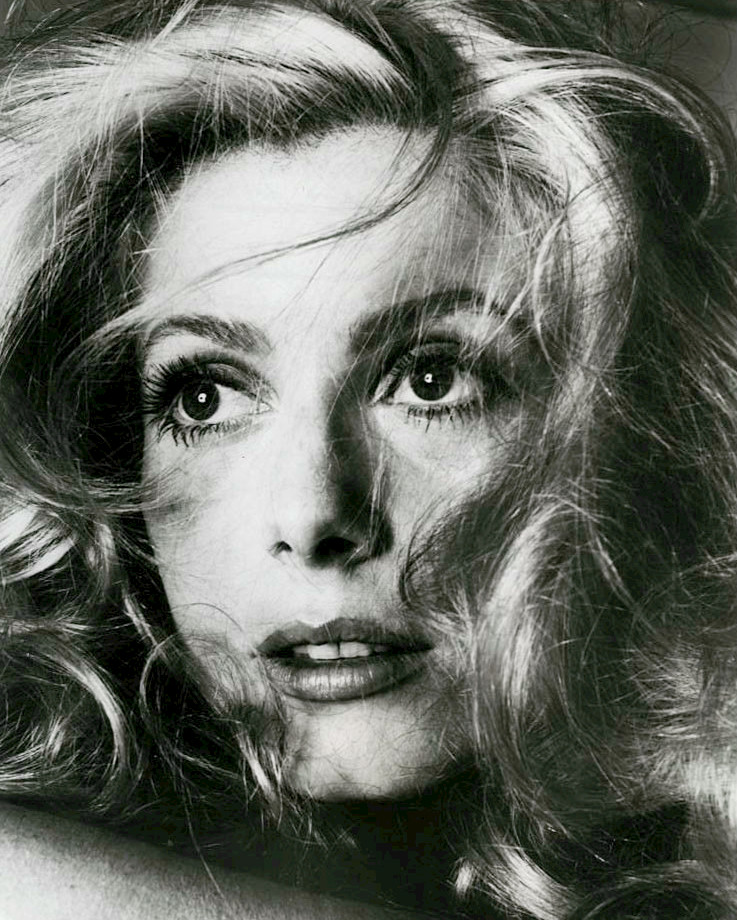
Deneuve in 1969

Deneuve made her film debut with a small role in André Hunebelle's Les Collégiennes (1957) with her younger sister Sylvie Dorléac who, like their older half-sister Daniele, was an occasional child actress. She subsequently appeared in several films for director Roger Vadim as well as in L'Homme à femmes (1960), which caught the eye of Jacques Demy, who cast Deneuve as Geneviève Emery in his romantic film musical The Umbrellas of Cherbourg (1964), the film that brought her to stardom. The film received critical acclaim winning the Palme d'Or at the 1964 Cannes Film Festival. Variety praised her performance, writing, "Catherine Deneuve, a winsome-looking type that other directors have forced to act, here is allowed to be herself. She etches a fine portrait of a 16-year-old in love." The same year she acted in several films including the anthology film The World's Most Beautiful Swindlers in a segment directed by Claude Chabrol and the comedy Male Hunt directed by Édouard Molinaro.

In her English-language debut, Deneuve played the cold but erotic persona, for which she would be nicknamed the "ice maiden", in Roman Polanski's psychological horror thriller Repulsion (1965). For her performance she was nominated for the New York Film Critics Circle Award for Best Actress. Peter Bradshaw of The Guardian wrote, "Catherine Deneuve's glassy stare of anxiety dominates the movie" comparing her to Janet Leigh in Psycho (1960). In 1966 she starred in the Agnès Varda fantasy film Les Créatures and Jean-Paul Rappeneau's A Matter of Resistance. The following year, she reunited with Demy for another musical The Young Girls of Rochefort (1967) acting alongside George Chakiris and Gene Kelly. She played a twin to her real-life older sister, Françoise Dorléac (as Solange), in what would be their only film together; Dorléac died in a car accident a few months after the movie opened. That same year she starred in Luis Buñuel's psychological erotic drama Belle de Jour (1967). Deneuve stars as a young woman who spends her midweek afternoons as a high-class prostitute, while her husband is at work. For her performance, she received a nomination for the BAFTA Award for Best Actress in a Leading Role. Melissa Anderson writing for Criterion declared, "Deneuve's performance in Belle de jour turned out to be one of her most iconic".

In 1969, Deneuve starred in Stuart Rosenberg's American romantic comedy film The April Fools, starring opposite Jack Lemmon. That same year she acted in François Truffaut's romantic crime drama Mississippi Mermaid acting alongside Jean-Paul Belmondo. The New York Times film critic Vincent Canby praised the film writing, "As in all of Truffaut's films, love leads only to an uncertain future that, at best, may contain some joy along with the inevitable misery. Truffaut's special talent, however, is for communicating a sense of the value of that joy." She reunited with Buñel for the drama Tristana (1970) acting alongside Fernando Rey and Franco Nero. Her work for Buñuel would be her best known. That same year, she reunited with Jacques Demy for the musical fantasy Donkey Skin (1970) based on the 1695 fairy tale of the same name by Charles Perrault. Roger Ebert praised the film writing, "It provides a visual feast and fanciful imaginations, and Deneuve was then, as she was before and since, a great beauty with the confidence such beauty requires."

=== 1971–1989: Established actress ===
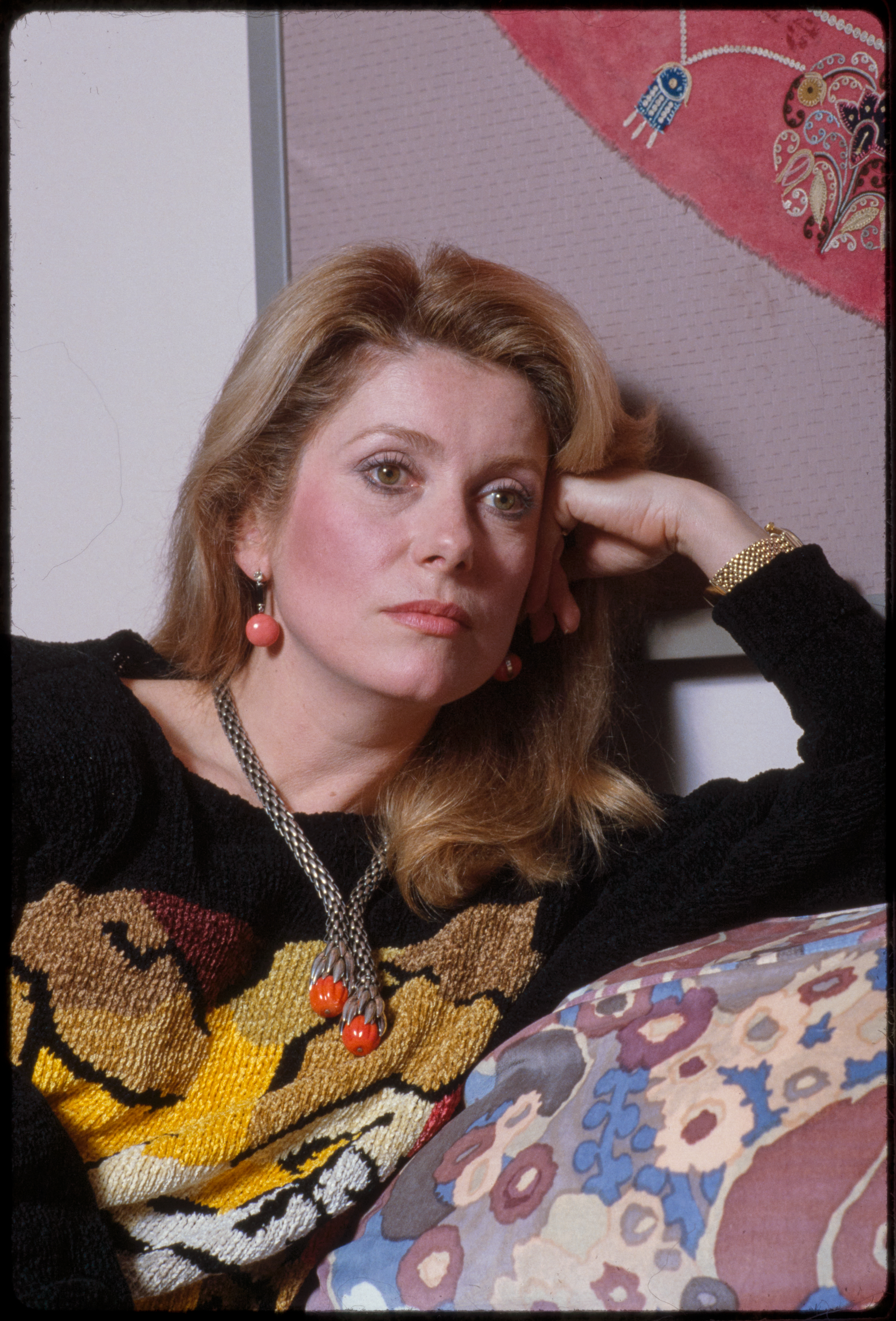
Catherine Deneuve in 1983

In 1971, Deneuve starred in Nadine Trintignant's It Only Happens to Others opposite Marcello Mastroianni. She also starred in Marco Ferreri's Italian drama Liza (1972), Jean-Pierre Melville's French crime film Un flic (1972), and Jacques Demy's French comedy A Slightly Pregnant Man (1973). She starred in Robert Aldrich's crime film Hustle (1975) with Burt Reynolds. Gene Siskel of the Chicago Tribune awarded a full four stars out of four and wrote that "violence takes a back seat to character development and storytelling techniques that are classical. Hustle is the kind of picture you don't want to see end. It's going to be a cult favorite." That same year, she acted in Jean-Paul Rappeneau's adventure film Le Sauvage (1975) with Yves Montand. The following year, she acted in Claude Lelouch's Second Chance (1976).

In the 1980s, Deneuve's films included François Truffaut's Le Dernier métro (1980) with Gérard Depardieu for which she won the César Award for Best Actress and the David di Donatello Award for Best Actress. She gained acclaim for her role in Tony Scott's The Hunger (1983) as a bisexual vampire, co-starring with David Bowie and Susan Sarandon, a role which brought her a significant lesbian following, mostly among the gothic subculture. During this time, she received César Award for Best Actress nominations for her roles in André Téchiné's romantic drama Hotel America (1981), Jean-Pierre Mocky's French drama film Agent trouble (1987), and François Dupeyron's drama Drôle d'endroit pour une rencontre (1988). The later of which she also served as a producer, and starred alongside frequent co-star Gérard Depardieu.

=== 1990–present ===
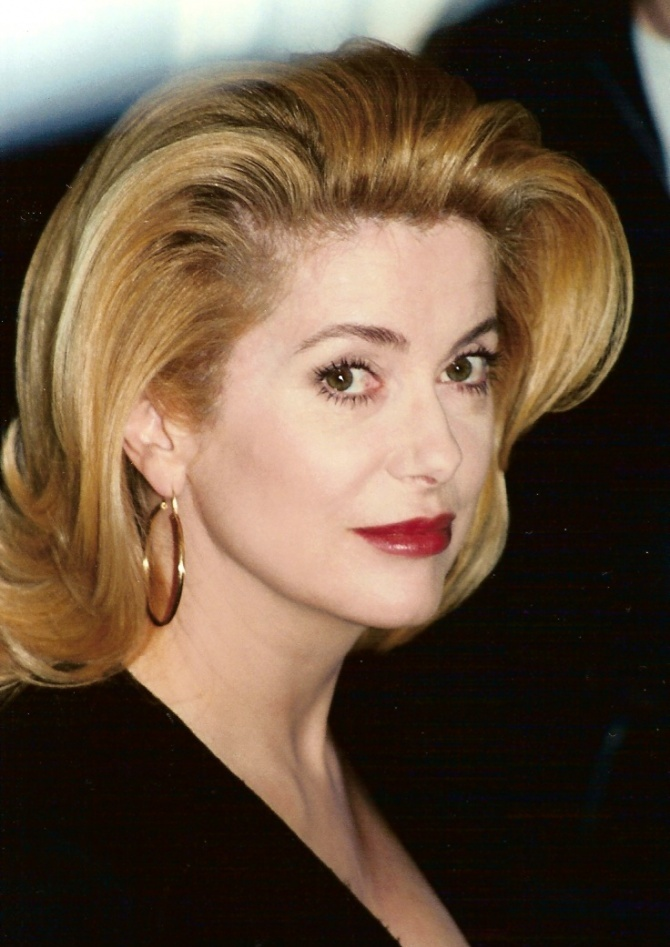
Deneuve in 1995

In the early 1990s, Deneuve's more significant roles included 1992's Indochine opposite Vincent Perez, for which she was nominated for an Academy Award for Best Actress and won a second César Award for Best Actress; and André Téchiné's two films, Ma saison préférée (1993) and Les Voleurs (1996). In 1997, Deneuve was the protagonist in the music video for the song N'Oubliez Jamais sung by Joe Cocker. In 1998, she won acclaim and the Volpi Cup at the Venice Film Festival for her performance in Place Vendôme. In the late 1990s, Deneuve continued to appear in a large number of films such as 1999's five films Est-Ouest, Le temps retrouvé, Pola X, Belle maman, and Night Wind.

Deneuve's part in Lars von Trier's musical drama Dancer in the Dark (2000), alongside Icelandic singer Björk was subject to considerable critical scrutiny. The film was selected for the Palme d'Or at the Cannes Film Festival. She made another foray into Hollywood the following year, starring in The Musketeer (2001) for Peter Hyams. In 2002, she shared the Silver Bear Award for Best Ensemble Cast at the Berlin International Film Festival for her performance in 8 Women. In 2005, Deneuve published her diary A l'ombre de moi-meme ("In My Own Shadow", published in English as Close Up and Personal: The Private Diaries of Catherine Deneuve); in it she writes about her experiences shooting the films Indochine and Dancer in the Dark. She also provided the voice role of Marjane Satrapi's mother in Satrapi's animated autobiographical film Persepolis (2007), based on the graphic novel of the same name.

Her 100th film appearance was in Un conte de Noël released in 2008. Deneuve's later work includes Potiche (2010) with frequent co-star Depardieu, Beloved (2011), alongside former co-stars Ludivine Sagnier and Chiara Mastroianni, the popular French adventure comedy Asterix and Obelix: God Save Britannia (2012) with Gérard Depardieu and Valérie Lemercier, screenwriter and director Emmanuelle Bercot's On My Way (2013), Palme d'Or winning writer/director Pierre Salvadori's comedy drama In the Courtyard (2014), and André Téchiné's drama In the Name of My Daughter (2014). She co-starred alongside Catherine Frot, in writer/director Martin Provost's French drama The Midwife (2017).

As of 2026, her films have sold a total of 99 million admissions in France.

== Career outside film ==
=== Modeling ===
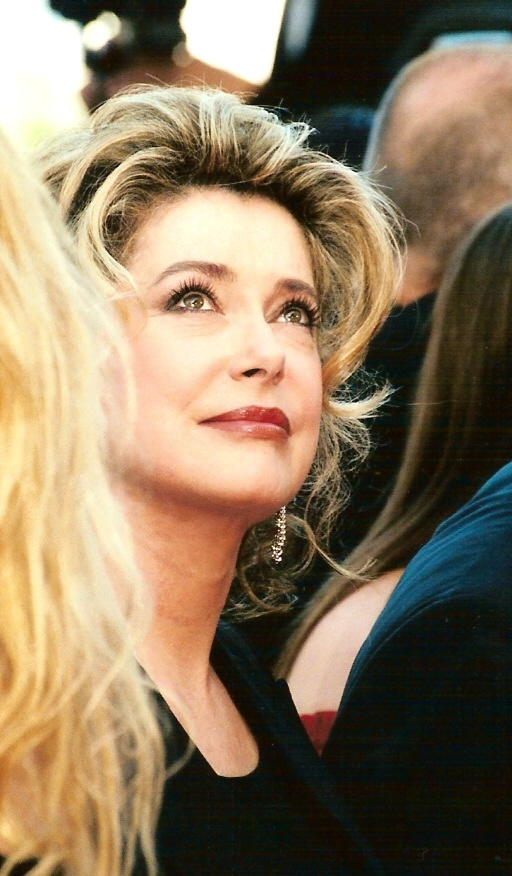
Deneuve in 1999

Deneuve appeared nude in two Playboy pictorials in 1963 and 1965. Her image was used to represent Marianne, the national symbol of France, from 1985 to 1989. As the face of Chanel No. 5 in the late 1970s, she caused sales of the perfume to soar in the United States – so much so that the American press, captivated by her charm, nominated her as the world's most elegant woman. In 1983, American Home Products retained her to represent their cosmetics line and hired world-renowned photographer Richard Avedon to promote its line of Youth Garde cosmetics, for which she famously proclaimed, "Look closely. Next year, I will be 40."

She is considered the muse of designer Yves Saint Laurent; he dressed her in the films Belle de Jour, La Chamade, La sirène du Mississippi, Un flic, Liza, and The Hunger. In 1992, she became a model for his skincare line.

In 2001, she was chosen as the new face of L'Oréal Paris. In 2006, Deneuve became the third inspiration for the M•A•C Beauty Icon series and collaborated on the colour collection that became available at M•A•C locations worldwide in February that year. Deneuve began appearing in the new Louis Vuitton luggage advertisements in 2007. Deneuve was listed as one of the fifty best-dressed over 50s by the Guardian in March 2013. In July 2017, Deneuve appeared in a video campaign for Louis Vuitton entitled Connected Journeys, celebrating the launch of the brand's Tambour Horizon smartwatch, which also featured celebrities, including Jennifer Connelly, Bae Doona, Jaden Smith and Miranda Kerr.

=== Entrepreneurial ===
In 1986, Deneuve introduced her own perfume, Deneuve. She is also a designer of glasses, shoes, jewelry and greeting cards. In 2005, she launched a limited-edition makeup collection for MAC Cosmetics. For the Catherine Deneuve eyewear line, she has had licensing agreements with Viva International (from 1989) and Marcolin (2014–2019) for the design, production and distribution of sunglasses and optical frames.

== Charities ==
- Deneuve was appointed UNESCO Goodwill Ambassador for the Safeguarding of Film Heritage in 1994 until her resignation on 12 November 2003.
- Deneuve asked that the rights owed to her from her representation of Marianne be given to Amnesty International.
- Louis Vuitton made a donation to The Climate Project, spearheaded by Al Gore, on behalf of Deneuve.
- Deneuve is also involved with Children Action, Children of Africa, Orphelins Roumains and Reporters Without Borders.
- Douleur sans frontiers (Pain Without Borders) – At the end of 2003, Deneuve recorded a radio commercial to encourage donations to fight against the pain in the world, notably for the victims of landmines.
- Handicap International – In the middle of July 2005, Deneuve lent her voice to the message of radio commercials, TV and cinema, which denounced the use of the BASM (cluster bombs).
- Voix de femmes pour la démocratie (Voice of women for democracy) – Deneuve read the text, "Le petit garçon", of Jean-Lou Dabadie, on the entitled CD, "Voix de femmes pour la démocratie." The CD was sold for the benefit of the female victims of the war and the fundamentalisms that fight for democracy.
- Deneuve has also been involved with various charities in the fight against AIDS and cancer.

== Political involvement ==
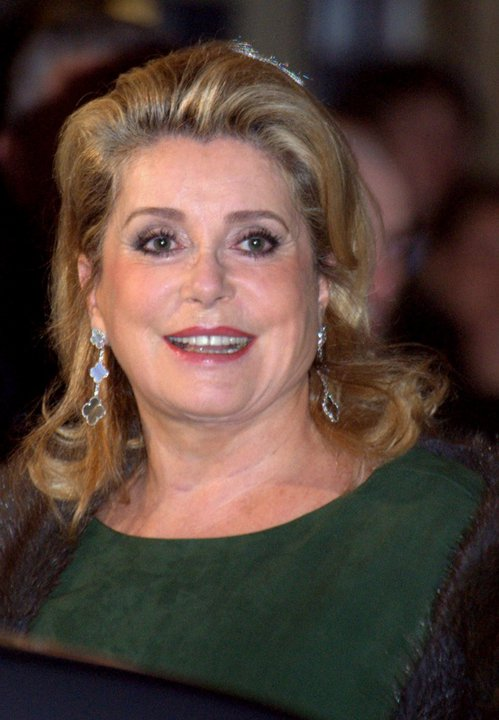
Deneuve at the 2011 César Awards

In 1971, Deneuve signed the Manifesto of the 343. The manifesto was an admission by its signers to have had illegal abortions, and therefore exposed themselves to judicial actions and prison sentences. It was published in Le Nouvel Observateur on 5 April 1971. That same year, feminist lawyer Gisèle Halimi founded the group, Choisir ("To Choose"), to protect the women who had signed the Manifesto of the 343.

Deneuve is involved with Amnesty International's program to abolish the death penalty.

In 2001, Deneuve delivered a petition organized by the French-based group, "Together Against the death penalty", to the U.S. Embassy in Paris.

In April 2007, Deneuve signed a petition on the internet protesting against the "misogynous" treatment of socialist presidential candidate Ségolène Royal. More than 8,000 French men and women signed the petition, including French actress Jeanne Moreau.

In 2011, among other French celebrities Deneuve signed a petition asking the future President of France to propose a vote at the United Nations General Assembly to decriminalize homosexuality worldwide.

In January 2018, Deneuve, along with 99 other French women writers, performers and academics, signed an open letter that argued the #MeToo movement had gone too far, turning into a "witch hunt", and denounced it as a form of puritanism, resulting in a backlash. The letter defended men's "freedom to bother women," which they said was "indispensable to sexual freedom." Though she later apologized to all the victims who felt offended by the letter, she defended her involvement by saying there was "nothing in the letter" to Le Monde that said "anything good about harassment, otherwise [she] wouldn't have signed it".

In May 2025, Deneuve signed a petition started after the killing of Palestinian photojournalist Fatima Hassouna, accusing Israel of committing genocide in the Gaza Strip.

== Personal life ==
Besides her native French, Deneuve speaks fluent Italian and English, and has some knowledge of Spanish. Her hobbies and passions include gardening, drawing, photography, reading, music, cinema, fashion, antiques and decoration. According to a 1996 The New York Times article, she is a practicing Roman Catholic.

For decades, Deneuve has had an apartment on Place Saint-Sulpice in the 6th arrondissement of Paris. From 1989 to 2014, she also owned Château de Primard, a mansion in Guainville.

=== Marriage and family ===
Deneuve has been married once, to photographer David Bailey from 1965 to 1972, though they separated in 1967. She has lived with director Roger Vadim, actor Marcello Mastroianni, cinematographer Hugh Johnson, and Canal+ tycoon Pierre Lescure.

Deneuve has two children: actor Christian Vadim, from her relationship with Roger Vadim, and actress Chiara Mastroianni, from her relationship with Marcello Mastroianni. She has five grandchildren. Deneuve has not had a public relationship since her breakup with Lescure in 1991, with whom she remains friends; Deneuve's two children consider him their stepfather. According to Gala, in late 2019 Deneuve relied on Lescure while she recuperated from a stroke. In 2020, she told Paris Match that the two still talk to each other every day.

=== Relationships ===
Throughout her 20s and 30s, Deneuve reportedly dated actors Sami Frey, Clint Eastwood, Franco Nero, Burt Reynolds, and John Travolta as well as directors Roman Polanski, Jerry Schatzberg, François Truffaut, and Milos Forman, talent agent Bertrand de Labbey, singer Serge Gainsbourg, though she denies an intimate relationship with Gainsbourg. She is also rumoured to have had a brief relationship with TV host Carlos Lozano. Regarding Polanski who is still wanted in the U.S. for raping a 13-year-old girl, and pleaded guilty to "unlawful sexual intercourse with a minor" before fleeing to Europe, she said in a TV interview in 2017 that she "always found the word 'rape' excessive" in the circumstances.

In recent decades, Deneuve's highly private life has prompted speculation about her sexual orientation, which she acknowledged in a 2002 interview with Knack magazine: "Now that people know nothing about my private life, they start guessing: is there still a man in her life and who is he then? When they see me two or three times with a female friend they say: we've always known that." In 2006, Deneuve told The Daily Telegraph that she was in a relationship, though she did not disclose his name.

A 2020 biography of Johnny Hallyday by Gilles Lhote says the singer maintained a carefully hidden, 56-year affair with Deneuve that started when they were teenagers in 1961 and continued until Hallyday's death in 2017.

Deneuve was a close friend of the artist Nall, and owns some of his works.

=== Health ===
On 6 November 2019, BBC News reported that Deneuve suffered a mild stroke and was recuperating in a Paris hospital. Despite the health scare, there was no damage to her motor functions. Five weeks later, she was released from hospital, and spent the remainder of 2019 recuperating at her Paris home.

Deneuve began smoking in 1960 at age 16, and has been known to smoke up to three packs a day. She quit in 1985 with the aid of hypnotherapy, but started again in 1996. She quit again after her 2019 stroke, but by 2025, had resumed the habit using an electronic cigarette.

== Filmography ==
Key
†	Denotes works that have not yet been released

=== Film ===
Year	Title	Role	Director	Notes
1957	Les Collégiennes	Schoolgirl	André Hunebelle	Credited as Catherine Dorléac
1960	Les Petits Chats	—	Jacques R. Villa	
1960	L'Homme à femmes	Catherine	Jacques-Gérard Cornu	
1960	Les Portes claquent	Dany	Michel Fermaud; Jacques Poitrenaud	
1962	Ça c'est la vie	—	Claude Choublier	Short film
1962	Tales of Paris	Sophie	Marc Allégret	French: Les Parisiennes
1962	And Satan Calls the Turns	Manuelle	Grisha Dabat	French: Et Satan conduit le bal
1963	Vice and Virtue	Justine Morand	Roger Vadim	French: Le Vice et la Vertu
1963	Portuguese Vacation	Catherine	Pierre Kast	French: Vacances portugaises
1964	The Umbrellas of Cherbourg	Geneviève Emery	Jacques Demy	French: Les Parapluies de Cherbourg
1964	The World's Most Beautiful Swindlers	Swindler	Claude Chabrol	French: Les Plus belles escroqueries du monde
1964	Male Hunt	Denise	Édouard Molinaro	French: La Chasse à l'homme
1964	Male Companion	Isabelle	Philippe de Broca	French: Un monsieur de compagnie
1964	La costanza della ragione	Lori	Pasquale Festa Campanile	
1965	Repulsion	Carol Ledoux	Roman Polanski	
1965	Who Wants to Sleep?	Angela Claasen	Rolf Thiele; Axel von Ambesser; Alfred Weidenmann	German: Das Liebeskarussell
1965	Le Chant du monde	Clara	Marcel Camus	
1966	A Matter of Resistance	Marie	Jean-Paul Rappeneau	French: La Vie de château
1966	Les Créatures	Mylène	Agnès Varda	
1967	The Young Girls of Rochefort	Delphine Garnier	Jacques Demy	French: Les Demoiselles de Rochefort
1967	Belle de Jour	Séverine Serizy / Belle de Jour	Luis Buñuel	
1968	Benjamin	Anne de Clécy	Michel Deville	French: Benjamin ou les Mémoires d'un puceau
1968	Manon 70	Manon	Jean Aurel	
1968	Mayerling	Maria Vetsera	Terence Young	
1968	La Chamade	Lucile	Alain Cavalier	
1969	The April Fools	Catherine Gunther	Stuart Rosenberg	
1969	Mississippi Mermaid	Julie Roussel / Marion Vergano	François Truffaut	French: La Sirène du Mississipi
1969	Tout peut arriver	Herself	Philippe Labro	Interviewee
1970	Tristana	Tristana	Luis Buñuel	
1970	Donkey Skin	Princess / 'Donkey Skin'	Jacques Demy	French: Peau d'Âne
1971	It Only Happens to Others	Catherine	Nadine Trintignant	French: Ça n'arrive qu'aux autres
1972	Liza	Liza	Marco Ferreri	
1972	Un flic	Cathy	Jean-Pierre Melville	
1973	A Slightly Pregnant Man	Irène de Fontenoy	Jacques Demy	French: L'Événement le plus important depuis que l'homme a marché sur la Lune
1974	Don't Touch the White Woman!	Marie-Hélène de Boismonfrais	Marco Ferreri	French: Touche pas à la femme blanche !
1974	The Murri Affair	Linda Murri	Mauro Bolognini	
1974	The Woman in Red Boots	Françoise LeRoi	Juan Luis Buñuel	
1975	Zig Zag	Marie	László Szabó	
1975	L'Agression	Sarah	Gérard Pirès	
1975	Lovers Like Us	Nelly	Jean-Paul Rappeneau	French: Le Sauvage
1975	Hustle	Nicole Britton	Robert Aldrich	
1976	Second Chance	Catherine Berger	Claude Lelouch	French: Si c'était à refaire
1977	The Forbidden Room	Sofia Stolz	Dino Risi	
1977	March or Die	Simone Picard	Dick Richards	
1977	Beach House	Woman in the dream	Sergio Citti	Italian: Casotto
1978	L'Argent des autres	Cécile Rainier	Christian de Chalonge	
1979	Ils sont grands, ces petits	Louise Mouchin	Joël Santoni	
1979	An Adventure for Two	Françoise	Claude Lelouch	French: À nous deux
1979	Courage fuyons	Eva	Yves Robert	
1979	Écoute voir	Claude Alphand	Hugo Santiago	
1980	The Last Metro	Marion Steiner	François Truffaut	French: Le Dernier Métro
1980	Je vous aime	Alice	Claude Berri	
1981	Choice of Arms	Nicole Durieux	Alain Corneau	French: Le Choix des armes
1981	Hotel America	Hélène	André Téchiné	French: Hôtel des Amériques
1982	Le Choc	Claire	Robin Davis	
1983	L'Africain	Charlotte	Philippe de Broca	
1983	The Hunger	Miriam Blaylock	Tony Scott	
1984	Le Bon Plaisir	Claire Després	Francis Girod	
1984	Fort Saganne	Louise	Alain Corneau	
1984	Paroles et Musique	Margaux	Élie Chouraqui	
1986	Let's Hope It's a Girl	Claudia	Mario Monicelli	
1986	Scene of the Crime	Lili Ravenel	André Téchiné	French: Le Lieu du crime
1987	Agent trouble	Amanda Weber	Jean-Pierre Mocky	
1988	Frequent Death	Jeanne Quester	Élisabeth Rappeneau	
1988	A Strange Place to Meet	France	François Dupeyron	French: Drôle d'endroit pour une rencontre
1991	La Reine blanche	Liliane Ripoche	Jean-Loup Hubert	
1992	Indochine	Éliane Devries	Régis Wargnier	
1993	My Favorite Season	Émilie	André Téchiné	French: Ma saison préférée
1994	La Partie d'échecs	Marquise	Yves Hanchar	
1995	One Hundred and One Nights	The star-fantasy	Agnès Varda	French: Les Cent et Une Nuits de Simon Cinéma
1995	The Convent	Hélène	Manoel de Oliveira	Portuguese: O Convento
1996	Thieves	Marie Leblanc	André Téchiné	French: Les Voleurs
1996	Court toujours : L'inconnu	Marianne	Ismaël Ferroukhi	Short film
1996	The Snow Queen	The Snow Queen	Lev Atamanov	Voice role French dub
1997	Genealogies of a Crime	Jeanne / Solange	Raúl Ruiz	
1997	Sans titre	—	Leos Carax	Short film
1998	Place Vendôme	Marianne Malivert	Nicole Garcia	
1999	Le vent de la nuit	Hélène	Philippe Garrel	
1999	Belle maman	Léa	Gabriel Aghion	
1999	Pola X	Marie	Leos Carax	
1999	Time Regained	Odette de Crécy	Raúl Ruiz	French: Le Temps retrouvé
1999	East/West	Gabrielle Develay	Régis Wargnier	French: Est-Ouest; Russian: Восток-Запад
2000	Dancer in the Dark	Kathy	Lars von Trier	
2001	I'm Going Home	Marguerite	Manoel de Oliveira	French: Je rentre à la maison, Portuguese: Vou Para Casa
2001	Absolutely Fabulous	A spectator of the parade	Gabriel Aghion	Cameo appearance
2001	The Musketeer	The Queen	Peter Hyams	
2001	Le petit poucet	The Queen	Olivier Dahan	
2002	8 Women	Gaby	François Ozon	French: 8 femmes
2002	Au plus près du paradis	Fanette	Tonie Marshall	
2003	A Talking Picture	Delfina	Manoel de Oliveira	Portuguese: Um Filme Falado
2004	Kings and Queen	Mme Vasset	Arnaud Desplechin	
2004	Changing Times	Cécile	André Téchiné	
2005	Palais royal!	Eugénia	Valérie Lemercier	
2006	Le Concile de pierre	Sybille Weber	Guillaume Nicloux	
2006	Le héros de la famille	Alice Mirmont	Thierry Klifa	
2007	After Him (Après lui)	Camille	Gaël Morel	
2007	Persepolis	Taji Satrapi	Marjane Satrapi; Vincent Paronnaud	Voice role
2008	A Christmas Tale	Junon Vuillard	Arnaud Desplechin	French: Un conte de Noël
2008	Je veux voir	Herself	Joana Hadjithomas; Khalil Joreige	
2008	Mes stars et moi	Solange Duvivier	Laetitia Colombani	
2009	Cyprien	Vivianne Wagner	David Charhon	
2009	The Girl on the Train	Louise	André Téchiné	French: La Fille du RER
2009	Park Benches	The client to the cupboard	Bruno Podalydès	French: Bancs publics (Versailles Rive-Droite)
2009	Hidden Diary	Martine	Julie Lopes-Curval	French: Mères et Filles
2010	Potiche	Suzanne Pujol	François Ozon	
2010	The Big Picture	Anne	Eric Lartigau	French: L'Homme qui voulait vivre sa vie
2011	Les yeux de sa mère	Lena Weber	Thierry Klifa	
2011	Beloved	Madeleine	Christophe Honoré	French: Les Bien-aimés
2012	Lines of Wellington	Severina	Valeria Sarmiento	French: Les Lignes de Wellington
2012	God Loves Caviar	Empress Catherine II of Russia	Yannis Smaragdis	French: Dieu aime le caviar
2012	Asterix and Obelix: God Save Britannia	Queen Cordelia	Laurent Tirard	French: Astérix et Obélix : Au service de sa Majesté
2013	On My Way	Bettie	Emmanuelle Bercot	French: Elle s'en va
2014	In the Courtyard	Mathilde	Pierre Salvadori	French: Dans la cour
2014	Three Hearts	Madame Berger	Benoît Jacquot	French: 3 cœurs
2014	In the Name of My Daughter	Renée Le Roux	André Téchiné	French: L'Homme qu'on aimait trop
2015	The Brand New Testament	Martine	Jaco Van Dormael	French: Le Tout Nouveau Testament
2015	Standing Tall	Florence Blaque	Emmanuelle Bercot	French: La Tête haute
2016	Le Cancre	Marguerite	Paul Vecchiali	
2017	The Midwife	Béatrice Sobolevski	Martin Provost	French: Sage femme
2017	Belle à croquer	The Angel	Axel Courtière	Short film
2017	Bonne Pomme	Barbara	Florence Quentin	
2017	All That Divides Us	Louise Keller	Thierry Klifa	
2017	Naissance d'une étoile	Mlle Jean	James Bort	Short film
2018	Claire Darling	Claire Darling	Julie Bertuccelli	French: La Dernière Folie de Claire Darling
2018	Bad Seeds	Monique	Kheiron	French: Mauvaises Herbes
2019	The Truth	Fabienne	Hirokazu Kore-eda	French: La vérité
2020	Terrible Jungle	Chantal de Bellabre	Hugo Benamozig; David Caviglioli	
2021	Peaceful	Crystal Boltanski	Emmanuelle Bercot	French: De son vivant
2023	Bernadette	Bernadette Chirac	Léa Domenach	
2024	Marcello Mio	Catherine (herself)	Christophe Honoré	
2024	Spirit World	Claire Emery	Eric Khoo	
2026	Parallel Tales	Céline, l'éditrice	Asghar Farhadi	
2026	Gentle Monster	Eloise	Marie Kreutzer	
2026	Forty Love †		Pierre-Ange Carlotti	
2027	Peau d'homme	La marraine	Léa Domenach	

=== Television ===
Year	Title	Role	Director	Notes
1996	Court toujours: L'inconnu	Marianne	Ismaël Ferroukhi	Television film
2003	Les Liaisons dangereuses	Marquise Isabelle de Merteuil	Josée Dayan	Miniseries
2004	Princesse Marie	Princess Marie Bonaparte	Benoît Jacquot	Television film
2006	Nip/Tuck	Diana Lubey	Ryan Murphy	Episode: "Diana Lubey"
2007	Suddenly Gina	Elegant Lady	Maria von Heland	Television film

== Awards and honors ==
Deneuve has received numerous accolades including two César Awards for Best Actress for her performances in François Truffaut's The Last Metro (1980), for which she also won the David di Donatello for Best Foreign Actress, and Régis Wargnier's Indochine (1992); she is a 14-time César Award nominee. She received nominations for an Academy Award for Best Actress for Indochine and a BAFTA Award for Best Actress for Belle de Jour (1968). She received the Venice Film Festival's Volpi Cup for Best Actress for her role in Place Vendôme (1998). She also received numerous honorary accolades including the Berlin International Film Festival's Golden Bear in 1998 and the Venice Film Festival's Golden Lion in 2022.

In 1998, she was honored for her lifetime achievement at the 23rd Cairo International Film Festival. In 2000, a Golden Palm Star on the Palm Springs, California, Walk of Stars was dedicated to her. In 2013, she was honored for her lifetime achievement at the 26th European Film Awards. In 2015, she received the Lifetime Achievement Golden Orange Award from International Antalya Film Festival, Turkey. In 2020, The New York Times ranked her number 21 in its list of the 25 Greatest Actors of the 21st Century.

== Discography ==
- 1980:
  - Dieu fumeur de havanes – by and with Serge Gainsbourg (original film soundtrack Je vous aime by Claude Berri)
  - Quand on s'aime – duet with Gérard Depardieu, for a television programme
- 1981: Her first and only album issued – Souviens-toi de m'oublier written by Serge Gainsbourg
1. Digital delay
2. Depression au-dessus du jardin
3. Epsilon
4. Monna Vanna et Miss Duncan
5. Marine bond tremolo
6. Ces petits riens (duet with Serge Gainsbourg) – original version performed by Gainsbourg and Juliette Gréco (1964)
7. Souviens-toi de m'oublier (duet with Serge Gainsbourg)
8. Overseas telegram
9. What tu dis qu'est-ce tu say
10. Oh Soliman
11. Alice helas
- 1993: Paris Paris – by and with Malcolm McLaren
- 1997: Allo maman bobo – by Alain Souchon, during an evening with Les Enfoirés in 1997 with Alain Souchon, Jean-Jacques Goldman and Laurent Voulzy
- 1999: Joyeux anniversaire maman – by Stomy Bugsy (original film soundtrack Belle-maman by Gabriel Aghion)
- 2000: Cvalda – by and with Björk (included in Selmasongs, the soundtrack for Dancer in the dark by Lars von Trier)
- 2001: Toi jamais – original film soundtrack Huit Femmes by François Ozon (original version performed by Sylvie Vartan en 1976)
- 2006: Ho capito che ti amo – original film soundtrack Le héros de la famille by Thierry Klifa
- 2010: C'est beau la vie by Jean Ferrat – original film soundtrack Potiche by François Ozon
- 2011: Tout est si calme with Clara Couste, Ludivine Sagnier and Chiara Mastroianni, Une fille légère in duet with Chiara Mastroianni, Je ne peux vivre sans t'aimer – original film soundtrack Beloved, songs by Alex Beaupain
- Audiobooks for Éditions des Femmes:
  - Cendrillon by Charles Perrault
  - Bonjour tristesse by Françoise Sagan
  - Les Petits Chevaux de Tarquinia by Marguerite Duras
  - Les Paradis aveugles by Duong Thu Huong
  - La Marquise d'O by Heinrich von Kleist
  - Lettres à un jeune poète by Rainer Maria Rilke
  - Letters Home by Sylvia Plath

== See also ==
- Cinema of France
- History of cinema
