= My Favorite Season =

- Theatrical release poster
- Directed by: André Téchiné
- Written by: Pascal Bonitzer; André Téchiné
- Produced by: Alain Sarde
- Starring: Catherine Deneuve; Daniel Auteuil; Marthe Villalonga
- Cinematography: Thierry Arbogast
- Edited by: Martine Giordano
- Music by: Philippe Sarde
- Distributed by: AMLF
- Release date: 14 May 1993
- Running time: 127 minutes
- Country: France
- Language: French
- Budget: €6.9 million
- Box office: $11 million

My Favorite Season (French: Ma saison préférée) is a 1993 French drama film directed by André Téchiné, co-written by Téchiné and Pascal Bonitzer, and starring Catherine Deneuve, Daniel Auteuil, and Marthe Villalonga. The story concerns a middle-aged brother and sister who resume their fragile relationship when they are forced to care for their ailing mother. It won Best Foreign Language Film at the 1996 Boston Society of Film Critics Awards.

== Plot ==
Berthe, an elderly widow, is forced by her declining health to close the French farmhouse where she has spent much of her life. She moves in with her daughter Émilie and son-in-law Bruno, who share a legal practice and have two grown children: Anne, a law student, and Lucien, who was adopted. In spite of Émilie's efforts, Berthe is not happy in her daughter's bourgeois home in Blagnac. She sits by the swimming pool in the middle of the night talking to herself and finds the house pretentious. Worried about her mother's physical and mental health, Émilie pays a visit to her unmarried younger brother, Antoine, a neurosurgeon. They have not seen each other for three years, since they quarreled at their father's funeral. Émilie informs Antoine of their mother's condition and invites him to Christmas dinner with the family.

On Christmas Eve, Antoine arrives at his sister's home as Émilie, Bruno and Anne are leaving for midnight mass. Antoine urges himself not to get carried away and spoil the evening. As he wanders through the house looking for his mother, he surprises Lucien, who works at a nightclub in town, making out with Khadija, Émilie and Bruno's Moroccan secretary, who has been invited to spend Christmas with the family. Antoine promises not to tell anything. When he finds his mother's room, Berthe is delighted to see him, but complains about living with Émilie. She dislikes Bruno, has no affection for the grandchildren and does not value Émilie's efforts to put her at ease. Dinner is lively, but after the youngsters leave for Lucien's room, tempers flare between Bruno and Antoine and they exchange blows. Antoine leaves with a bloody nose and Berthe departs with him. Talking later with Bruno, Émilie says she loathes what they have become. Anne is distraught by the family's dispute and looks to Khadija for solace.

Berthe returns to live alone at her farm but suffers a stroke. This forces Émilie to visit her brother once again. Antoine has moved to a small apartment in Toulouse. He is glad to learn that Émilie has separated from Bruno. The siblings agree to place their mother in a nursing home. They pick up Berthe and on the drive they remember old times. When Émilie and Antoine sing as they used to when they were children, Berthe cheers up. On a stop during the trip, Antoine fulfills a childhood dream and goes skinny-dipping in a river. Berthe introduces her children to the director of the retirement home. She took good care of her children and they are now two very successful professionals who are too busy to take care of her, she says bitterly. Pressured by her brother, Émilie spends the night at Antoine's apartment. He gives her a drug to help her sleep and joins Khadija and Anne at the bar where Lucien works. Anne has now given up her law studies and works in a music shop. Lucien and Khadija have a rocky relationship. Antoine tries to rekindle the childhood closeness he enjoyed with his sister.

When Antoine and Émilie visit their mother at the retirement home, her physical and mental health have greatly deteriorated. She says she wishes she had had a third child because that child would have taken care of her. Émilie and Antoine remove their mother from the nursing home. An exam at the hospital where Antoine works confirms their suspicion that Berthe is in her final decline. Émilie moves back to her house at Blagnac. Antoine breaks into the house to talk to her, and they have an argument. They recriminate each other about their behavior toward their mother. Feeling guilty, Antoine makes a halfhearted suicide attempt, jumping from the balcony of his apartment and breaking a leg. Berthe dies alone at the hospital. After the funeral, Antoine, Émilie, Bruno, Lucien, Anne and Khadija meet at the house in Blagnac and have breakfast outdoors. During the conversation Anne asks the others which is their favorite season since she does not have one. Before Antoine's departure Émilie recites a poem she learned as a song as a child. She used to sing it while waiting at school for the holidays to be reunited with Antoine.

== Cast ==
- Catherine Deneuve as Émilie
- Daniel Auteuil as Antoine
- Marthe Villalonga as Berthe
- Jean-Pierre Bouvier as Bruno
- Chiara Mastroianni as Anne
- Carmen Chaplin as Khadija
- Anthony Prada as Lucien
- Michèle Moretti as The director
- Jacques Nolot as man at the cemetery
- Bruno Todeschini as Émilie's lover
- Jean Bousquet as Émilie's father
- Roschdy Zem as Medhi
- Ingrid Caven as singer at the bar

== Production ==
My Favorite Season is based on an original screenplay by director André Téchiné that he and the scriptwriter and actor Pascal Bonitzer adapted for the screen. For the main roles Téchiné cast Deneuve and Auteuil; it was their third collaboration, having worked together in Gérard Pirès's crime drama L'Agression (Act of Aggression) (1975) and Claude Lelouch's Us Two (À nous deux) (1979). Mastroianni, daughter of Catherine Deneuve and Marcelo Mastroianni, and Chaplin, a granddaughter of Charlie Chaplin, made their film debuts. Principal shooting took place in Toulouse and in the department of Haute-Garonne.

== Release ==
=== Box office ===
My Favorite Season premiered on 14 May 1993 as the opening film at the 46th Cannes Film Festival. With 1.1 million tickets sold, it remains Téchiné's biggest box office success in France. The film was initially unable to acquire an American distributor and was released in the United States only three years later, after the modest art-house success of Téchiné's next film, Wild Reeds. It made $760,865 at the American box office, a respectable amount for a foreign-language art film.

=== Critical reception ===
The film received generally good reviews. It is widely considered, with Wild Reeds and Thieves, one of Téchiné's best. Rotten Tomatoes reports that 92% of 12 critics gave it a positive review.

Roger Ebert of the Chicago Sun-Times called My Favorite season "One of those intriguing films that functions without a plot, and uses instead an intense curiosity about its characters". In her review for The New York Times, Janet Maslin wrote that the film "finds the director probing believable troubles with honesty, intelligence and tact...Téchiné echoes the emotional fearlessness of a Bergman or Cassavetes in trying to capture the difficult, unruly essence of his characters' inner lives." She called the film an "intense, moving story of loss and renewal". Online film critic James Berardinelli praised the film, writing, "For those who enjoy rich, complex character dramas, the arrival of My Favorite Season is a cause for celebration". Edward Gutmann of The San Francisco Chronicle praised the look of the film. Lisa Schwarzbaum of Entertainment Weekly called it "mature and pensive". Todd McCarthy of Variety found the plot "dull".

== Awards and nominations ==
- Boston Film Critics (USA)
  - Won: Best Foreign Language Film
- Cannes Film Festival (France)
  - Nominated: Golden Palm (André Téchiné)
- César Awards (France)
  - Nominated: Best Actor – Leading Role (Daniel Auteuil)
  - Nominated: Best Actress – Leading Role (Catherine Deneuve)
  - Nominated: Best Actress – Supporting Role (Marthe Villalonga)
  - Nominated: Best Director (André Téchiné)
  - Nominated: Best Film
  - Nominated: Best Original Screenplay or Adaptation (Pascal Bonitzer and André Téchiné)
  - Nominated: Most Promising Actress (Chiara Mastroianni)
- Gramado Film Festival (Brazil)
  - Nominated: Golden Kikito - Best Latin Film (André Téchiné)
