= In the Courtyard =

- Film poster
- Directed by: Pierre Salvadori
- Written by: Pierre Salvadori; David Colombo Léotard
- Produced by: Philippe Martin
- Starring: Catherine Deneuve; Gustave Kervern
- Cinematography: Gilles Henry
- Edited by: Isabelle Devinck
- Music by: Grégoire Hetzel; Stephin Merritt
- Production companies: Les Films Pelléas; France 2 Cinéma
- Distributed by: Wild Bunch
- Release dates: 11 February 2014 (Berlin); 23 April 2014 (France)
- Running time: 97 minutes
- Country: France
- Language: French
- Budget: 7.6 million
- Box office: $3 million

In the Courtyard (French: Dans la cour) is a 2014 French comedy-drama film written and directed by Pierre Salvadori and starring Catherine Deneuve and Gustave Kervern. The film premiered at the 64th Berlin International Film Festival on 11 February 2014. Salvadori was awarded a Swann d'or for Best Director at the 2014 Cabourg Film Festival.

== Cast ==
- Catherine Deneuve as Mathilde
- Gustave Kervern as Antoine
- Féodor Atkine as Serge
- Pio Marmaï as Stéphane
- Michèle Moretti as Colette
- Nicolas Bouchaud as M. Maillard
- Oleg Kupchik as Lev
- Carole Franck as The Councillor
- Garance Clavel as Antoine's Ex
- Olivier Charasson as Specialist
- Bruno Netter as M. Vigo

== Production ==
Principal photography began from 8 October 2012.
