= Hotel America =

- Theatrical release poster
- French: Hôtel des Amériques
- Directed by: André Téchiné
- Written by: André Téchiné; Gilles Taurand
- Produced by: Alain Sarde
- Starring: Catherine Deneuve; Patrick Dewaere
- Cinematography: Bruno Nuytten
- Edited by: Claudine Merlin
- Music by: Philippe Sarde
- Production companies: Sara Films; Films A2
- Distributed by: Parafrance Films
- Release date: 2 December 1981 (France)
- Running time: 95 minutes
- Country: France
- Language: French
- Box office: $3.2 million

Hotel America (French: Hôtel des Amériques) is a 1981 French romantic drama film directed by André Téchiné, starring Catherine Deneuve and Patrick Dewaere. The film, set in Biarritz, tells the ill-fated romance of mismatched lovers. This is the first of several collaborations between Téchiné and Deneuve, who became his favorite actress.

== Plot ==
Hélène, an anesthetist working in Biarritz, is driving home one night and nearly hits a pedestrian, Gilles Tisserand. The two go for a coffee and end up spending that night at a diner so that she can file a report, but Gilles has fallen in love with her by the next morning. He asks her for a date, and she accepts, but remains indifferent to him.

Gilles has recently come back from a trip to New York, bringing with him a friend he met there, Bernard. An unemployed musician whose only real occupation is to enjoy the moment and spend time with his steady girlfriend, Colette, a cheerful post office clerk. The two friends live for free at the Hotel de la Gare, run by Gilles’ mother and his younger sister, Elise. Bernard would like to seduce Elise, a reader who never goes out and repeatedly turns him down.

Keen about his developing relationship with Hélène, Gilles invites her to a restaurant at the local casino with Bernard and Colette. The occasion ends in discord. Hélène clearly dislikes Bernard’s attitude and Gilles confronts her, disappointed with her air of superiority toward his friend. He backs off from her, suspecting that she could never really love someone less well off than herself. Gilles’ disenchantment has the opposite effect on Hélène and she is unable to let him go. Hélène looks for him and they eventually sleep together in his mother's hotel, initiating a serious relationship.

Gilles finds a job as a tourist guide and paints Hélène's beachfront apartment. Her past, however, haunts their relationship. She is still mourning the death of her previous lover, an architect who drowned in Biarritz more than a year ago. It was his tragic death that brought her to Biarritz, where her few friends include Jacqueline, the waitress at the cafe where she had her first encounter with Gilles; and Rudel, an older surgeon who, like Jacqueline, is a frequent gambler at the casino. Many years ago, Hélène and Rudel were lovers and he introduced her to the architect. Hélène has inherited La Salamandre, a large abandoned house outside of town, where the architect was planning to live. The house is still in disrepair, but after taking Gilles there he insists she leave the beachfront apartment and move to La Salamandre.

Bernard has an argument with Gilles about Hélène. Cruising at night in a park, Bernard encounters Luc, Collette’s gay friend and coworker, who attempts to pick him up, but is assaulted by Bernard as a result. A subsequent police investigation discovers stolen items in Bernard’s hotel room. Bernard is arrested and sent in jail, to Colette’s dismay.

Moving to La Salamandre proves a bad idea; the place is cold and far from town, and living there only complicates the relationship. As Hélène starts to warm up to Gilles over time and opens up about her personal life, he becomes increasingly temperamental, possessive and unpredictable, personality traits that threaten to drive them apart just as they are getting closer. He proposes a trip to London but backs down at the last moment. Moody and unstable, Gilles gets drunk and makes a scene by the beach. While Hélène looks after him, he slaps her. Disillusioned, Hélène decides to leave Biarritz behind and return to Paris. Once on the train, she tears up a photo of Gilles, but she is unable to bring herself to throw it out the windows.

Gilles has hopes of leaving Biarritz with Bernard, who has been released from jail and also wants to leave. The Hotel de la Gare has been renamed Hôtel des Amériques by its new owner. At the reopening party, Colette ends in tears when Luc tells her that Bernard has left town with some money he gave him after forgiving Bernard for the beating. Elise also meets Rudel at the party; they chat and she gives him a kiss. Gilles learns from Elise that Hélène has returned permanently to Paris. He runs to the train station but has to wait a day to catch the next train. He spends the night rehearsing what he would tell her, tears on his face.

== Cast ==
- Catherine Deneuve as Hélène
- Patrick Dewaere as Gilles
- Étienne Chicot as Bernard
- Josiane Balasko as Colette
- Dominique Lavanant as Jacqueline
- Sabine Haudepin as Elise
- François Perrot as Rudel
- Frédérique Ruchaud as mother
- Jean-Louis Vitrac as Luc

== Analysis ==
Hotel America quickly establishes the free-flowing narrative structure that Téchiné has become known for. Hélène and Gilles' relationship does not follow the conventional path of romantic films, instead carrying the unpredictability of real romantic struggles. Téchiné allowed his actors to improvise during shooting, and this lends the scenes spontaneity and a natural sense of awkwardness.

== DVD release ==
The film was released on DVD on 22 July 2008 in the United States as part of a box set of Téchiné's films. The film is in French with English subtitles. Hotel America is also available in Region 2 DVD.
