= The Midwife =

2017 film

- Film poster
- Directed by: Martin Provost
- Written by: Martin Provost
- Produced by: Olivier Delbosc; Jacques-Henri Bronckart; Olivier Bronckart
- Starring: Catherine Frot; Catherine Deneuve
- Release dates: 14 February 2017 (Berlin); 22 March 2017 (France)
- Running time: 117 minutes
- Countries: France; Belgium
- Language: French
- Budget: $8 million
- Box office: $7.2 million

The Midwife (French: Sage femme) is a 2017 drama film directed by Martin Provost. It was screened out of competition at the 67th Berlin International Film Festival.

== Plot ==
Claire is a midwife at a maternity unit that is due to close. She is contacted by Beatrice, who had been her father's mistress many years before. After thirty years of silence, Beatrice has traced Claire, not knowing that her father had committed suicide shortly after she left him. Claire and Beatrice arrange to meet. In spite of her age, Beatrice is very immature and rather extravagant. Claire has been leading a selfless life, concentrating on helping the mothers and babies in her care, and raising her son. She has an apartment in Mantes-la-Jolie and an allotment, where she meets Paul, a long-distance lorry driver in his fifties.

Beatrice is now being treated for a brain tumour and moves in with Claire, who takes care of her. Beatrice clearly did love Claire's father, and is distressed by her role in his suicide. She tries to make amends by helping Claire, but she is too ill and disorganised. She eventually leaves, leaving an expensive ring as a keepsake for Claire. Claire is now in a relationship with Paul.

== Cast ==
- Catherine Deneuve as Béatrice Sobolevski
- Catherine Frot as Claire Breton
- Olivier Gourmet as Paul Baron
- Quentin Dolmaire as Simon
- Mylène Demongeot as Rolande
- Pauline Etienne as Cécile Amado
- Karidja Touré as Madame Naja
- Audrey Dana as The chief nurse

== Reception ==
On review aggregator website Rotten Tomatoes, the film has an approval rating of 88% based on 73 reviews, with an average rating of 7/10. On Metacritic, the film has a weighted average score of 66 out of 100, based on 24 critics, indicating "generally favorable reviews". Both Vikram Murthi of RogerEbert.com and Peter Bradshaw of The Guardian gave the film 3 out of 5, with the latter lauded the roles of lead actresses by saying that "Catherine Deneuve and Catherine Frot give it their all in a moving, verging on sentimental, tale of homewrecking and home truths".

The Midwife grossed $7.2 million at the box office.
