= André Téchiné =

French screenwriter and film director (born 1943)

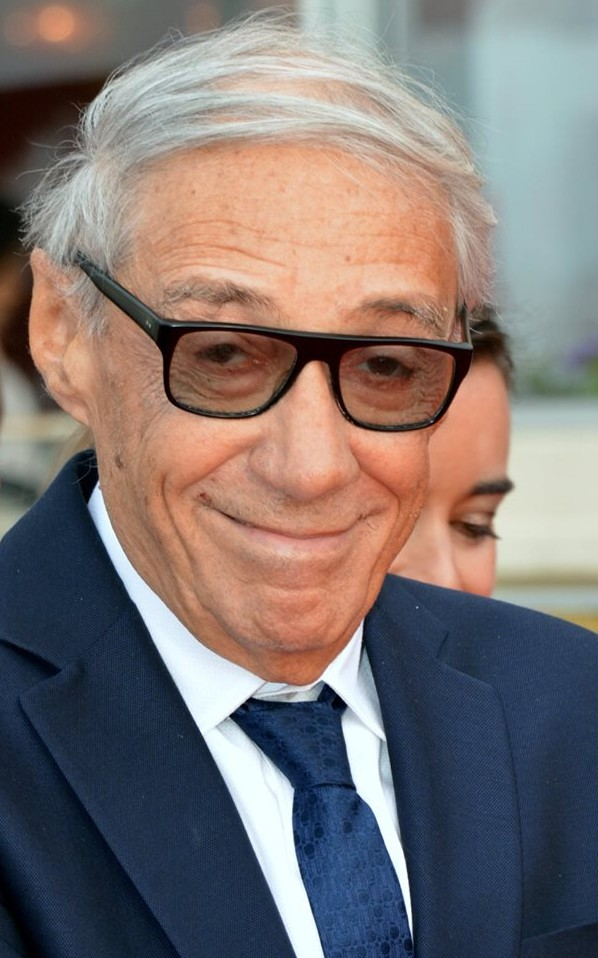
- Téchiné in 2018
- Born: 13 March 1943 (age 83); Valence-d'Agen, Tarn-et-Garonne, France
- Occupation: Filmmaker
- Years active: 1966–present
- Awards: Best Director Award (Cannes Film Festival); 1985 Rendez-vous

André Téchiné (French: [ɑ̃dʁe teʃine]; born 13 March 1943) is a French screenwriter and post-New Wave film director.

Téchiné belongs to a second generation of French film critics associated with Cahiers du cinéma who followed François Truffaut, Claude Chabrol, Jean-Luc Godard and others from criticism into filmmaking. One of Téchiné's trademarks is the examination of human relations in a sensitive but unsentimental way, as can be seen in his most acclaimed films: My Favorite Season (1993) and Wild Reeds (1994).

In his films he addresses various themes related to morality and the development of modern society, such as homosexuality, divorce, adultery, family breakdown, prostitution, crime, drug addiction or AIDS.

== Life ==
André Téchiné was born on 13 March 1943 at Valence-d'Agen, a small town in the Midi-Pyrénées region, department of Tarn-et-Garonne, France. His family, of Spanish ancestry, owned a small agricultural equipment business. He grew up in the southwest French countryside and in his adolescence acquired a passion for film. From 1952 to 1959 he went to a Catholic boarding school in Montauban. He was allowed to leave only on Sunday afternoons, when he would go to the cinema, although he often had to return before the screening ended. In 1959 he transferred to a secular state school, which exposed him to a different culture, with Marxist teachers, a film club and a film magazine, La Plume et l'écran, to which he contributed. "Films were my only opening to the world," Téchiné has said. "They were my only possibility of escaping my family environment and my boarding school. It was probably dangerous because, through movies, I learned how the world works and how human relations work. But it was magical, and I was determined to follow the thread of that magic."

At nineteen he moved to Paris to pursue filmmaking. He failed the entrance examination at France's most prominent film school Institut des hautes études cinématographiques (IDHEC), but started to write reviews for Cahiers du cinéma, where he worked for four years (1964–1967). His first article was about Truffaut's The Soft Skin, published in July 1964.

Téchiné's first filmmaking experience emerged from a theatrical milieu. He went on to become assistant director for Marc'O in Les Idoles (1967), a film version of an experimental play. This film was edited by Jean Eustache; Téchiné has an uncredited walk-on appearance in Eustache's film La Maman et la putain (1972). Téchiné was also assistant director to Jacques Rivette (his editor at Cahiers du Cinéma) on L'Amour fou (1969).

Téchiné is noted for his elegant and emotionally charged films that often delve into the complexities of the human condition and emotions. One of Téchiné's trademarks is the examination of human relations in a sensitive but unsentimental way. Influenced by Roland Barthes, Bertolt Brecht, Ingmar Bergman, William Faulkner, and the cinematic French New Wave, Téchiné's style lies in his exploration of sexuality and national identity, as he challenges expectations in his depictions of gay relations, the North African dimensions of contemporary French culture, or the center-periphery relationship between Paris and his native Southwest. Fear of flying prevents him from attending most film openings or festivals more than a train ride from his Paris apartment overlooking the Luxembourg Garden.

"I never know how each film will end," Téchiné has said. "When I'm filming, I shoot each scene as if it were a short film. It's only when I edit that I worry about the narrative. My objective is to tell a story, but that's the final thing I do."

== Film career ==
=== Paulina s'en va (1969) ===
André Téchiné made his debut as director with Paulina s'en va (Paulina is Leaving) (1969), in which the title character drifts aimlessly, struggling to find a way out of her disenchantment and find her calling in life. Initially conceived as a short, the film was shot in two periods, over one week in 1967 and two weeks in 1969. Shown at that year's Venice Film Festival, it disconcerted audiences and was not released until 1975. In the meantime, Téchiné provided screenplays for other directors, including one for Liliane de Kermadec's Aloïse.

=== Souvenirs d'en France (1974) ===
After working in television and theater, Téchiné first came to prominence with his second film, Souvenirs d'en France (French Provincial) (1974), a mix of black comedy, romantic drama and nostalgia with a distinct tone. The film was inspired by Orson Welles' The Magnificent Ambersons and filmed in Téchiné's native village. It is a highly compressed history of a small-town family from early in the century through the Resistance and on to May 1968. Téchiné explored the relationship between the grand scope of life and more personal histories. The film stars Jeanne Moreau.

=== Barocco (1976) ===
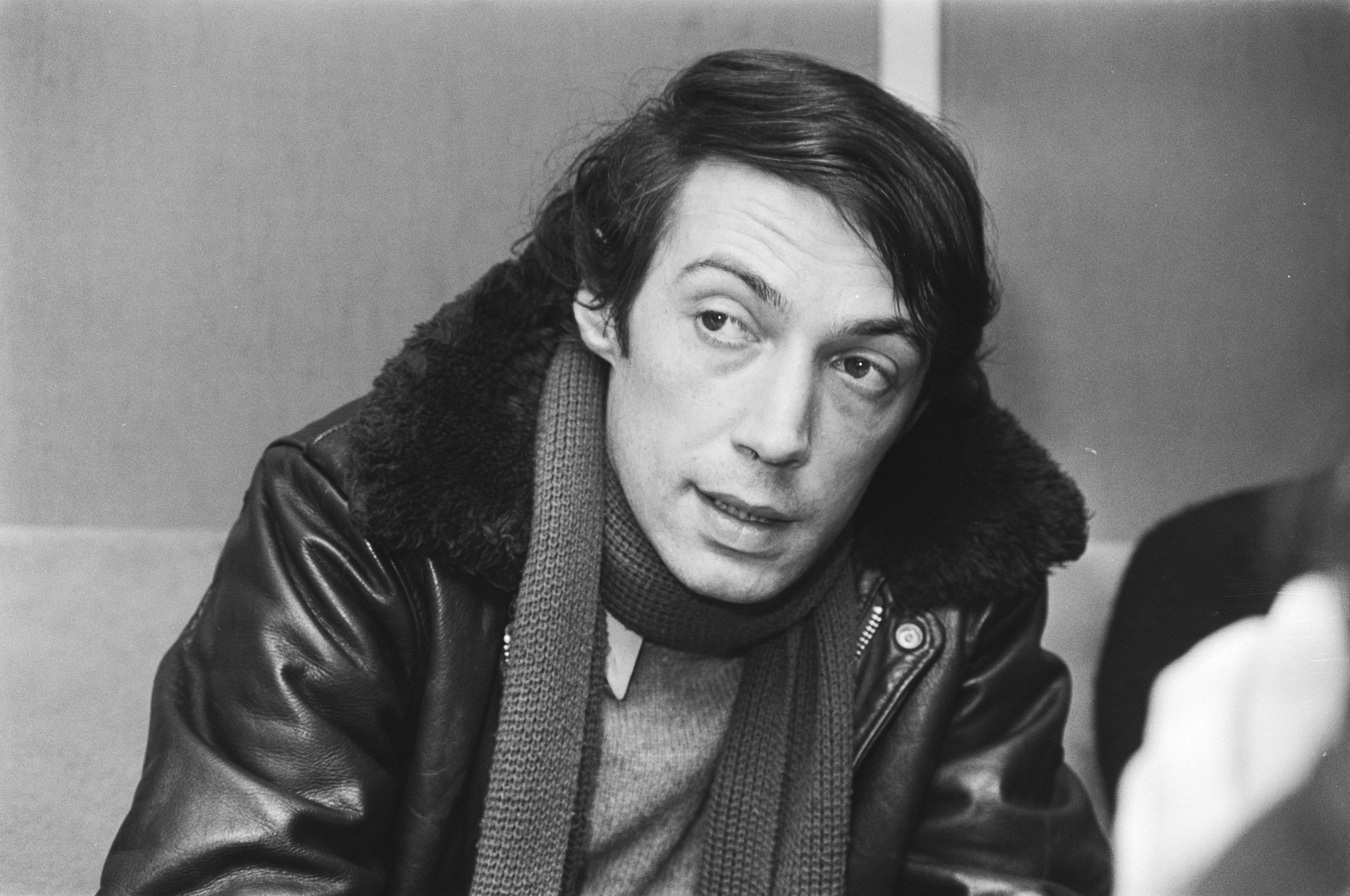
André Téchiné after filming Barocco in Amsterdam, 1976

Téchiné demonstrated his penchant for atmospheric storytelling with his next film, the thriller Barocco (1976), a crime drama. A boxer who accepted and then turned down a huge bribe from a politician to tell a lie that would influence an election is killed by a hired assassin. The boxer's girlfriend eventually falls in love with the killer while trying to remake him into the image of her slain lover. The film elicited critical plaudits for its elegant look.

=== Les Sœurs Brontë (1979) ===
Three years later, Téchiné took on biography with Les Sœurs Brontë (The Bronte Sisters)(1979), a profile of the Brontë sisters. The film's heavy, repressive mood evokes the harshness and injustice of the life the sisters endured. The passion and color that is so vivid in their novels was absent from their daily existence, and the film's gloomy cinematography evokes this. The film features an all-star cast: Isabelle Adjani, Marie-France Pisier and Isabelle Huppert as Emily, Charlotte and Anne Brontë, and Pascal Greggory as their ill-fated brother Branwell.

=== Hôtel des Amériques (1981) ===
Hôtel des Amériques (1981), set in Biarritz, explores the strained relationship between a successful middle-aged woman and an unfulfilled and emotionally unbalanced man in a story of hopelessly ill-matched love. This film marked a turning point in Téchiné's career, anchoring his work in a more realistic universe than the previous romantic one. For the first time Téchiné let his actors improvise, a practice he has continued ever since, adjusting his scripts to accommodate the new material. "From Hôtel des Amériques onwards my films are no longer genre films," he said. "My inspiration is no longer drawn from the cinema". This film also started a long productive collaboration with Catherine Deneuve. "There are some directors who are more feminine than others, like Téchiné, like Truffaut. They are an exceptional gift to actresses," Deneuve has said.

=== Rendez-vous (1985) ===
After making the television production La Matiouette ou l'Arrière-pays (1983), Téchiné returned to critical attention with Rendez-vous (1985), a noir melodrama replete with the seductive surface of the era. In the film a would-be actress, Nina, fleeing her provincial home for Paris, enters a turbulent love relationship with a sadistic, self-destructive young actor who caused the death of his former girlfriend. When the actor himself is killed in an accident, or possible suicide, his former mentor/director, and father of the dead girlfriend, determines to cast the inexperienced Nina as the female lead in 'Romeo and Juliet', a role his deceased daughter played. By now considered by some to be a major director of the post-New Wave, Téchiné won the Cannes Festival Best Direction Award while helping launch the career of Juliette Binoche.

=== Le Lieu du crime (1986) ===
Le Lieu du crime (1986) (Scene of the Crime) The story takes place in the rustic vicinity of a small provincial town, where a young boy helps an escaped criminal. The highly troubled youth, disaffected by his parents' divorce, lives with his mother and grandparents while the father lives nearby. The escaped convict commits murder to save the boy from harm but gets involved with the mother. By the time the boy is to have his first communion, the mother—trapped in a humdrum existence—has fallen in love with the convict and wants to run away with him.

=== Les Innocents (1987) ===
In Téchiné's next film, Les Innocents (1987), a young woman, born and raised in Northern France, is visiting the Mediterranean city of Toulon for the first time. She is prompted by two events: the wedding of her sister, and the disappearance of her brother, a deaf-mute who supports himself as a pickpocket under the tutelage of a young Arab and an older bisexual married man with a weakness for young Arabs. The girl meets them and finds herself attracted to the young Arab and the older man's son, who is bisexual like his father. She is soon torn between the two in a romantic and sexual dilemma that mirrors France's political turmoil over its growing Arab population.

=== J'embrasse pas (1991) ===
J'embrasse pas (I Don't Kiss) (1991) is a bleak, melancholic portrait of a young man searching and failing to find meaning in his life. An idealistic 17-year-old leaves his home in the rural southwest of France, hoping to make a career as an actor in Paris. After an auspicious start, he soon discovers that he has no talent as an actor and loses both his job and his room. In the end, he has to make a living as a male prostitute. He falls in love with a young prostitute, but the relationship has terrible consequences for him.

=== My Favorite Season (1993) ===
My Favorite Season (Ma saison préférée) (1993) is a dark and somber story of middle-aged estranged siblings, a provincial lawyer (sister) and a surgeon (brother). They have begun to come to terms with what they have become professionally and personally when their aging mother begins to decline after a stroke. Téchiné has called Ma saison préférée a film "about individuality and the coldness of the modern world." It earned acclaim when it was screened in competition at the 1993 Cannes Film Festival.

=== Wild Reeds (1994) ===
The following year, Téchiné had his greatest success to date with Wild Reeds (Les Roseaux sauvages) (1994). The film was commissioned by French television as one of part of a series of eight films entitled Tous les garçons et les filles de leur âge, although it was shown first at cinemas. This is a tale of teenage self-discovery centered on the inner turmoil of four teenagers staying at a boarding school in Aquitaine in 1962, their political and sexual awakening with the effect of the Algerian War as backdrop. Téchiné works with certain sets of themes including family bonds, homosexuality, and exile. Wild Reeds is his most autobiographical movie; like the teen-age Téchiné, the main character, François, attends an all-male boarding school. While part of the story revolves around François' discovery that he is gay, Téchiné said his principal interest was to evoke how the Algerian war of independence was felt in a rural corner of France."If I hadn't been able to inject this, if I had only been making a film about adolescent coming of age, it wouldn't have interested me at all," he explained.

Wild Reeds was a hit at the 1994 César award ceremony, winning four out of eight nominations (best film, best director, best script, and best newcomer for Élodie Bouchez). It also won the Prix Delluc in 1994. This was Téchiné's sixth film released in the US (in 1995—following French Provincial (Souvenirs d'en France), Barocco, Hôtel des Amériques, Rendez-vous and Scene of the Crime) and his most autobiographical film to date. Wild Reeds won the New York Film Critics Award and National Society of Film Critics Award for Best Foreign Language Film.

=== Les Voleurs (1996) ===
Further acclaim greeted the director in 1996 with Les Voleurs (Thieves) (1996), an ambitious and complex crime drama. The film jumps through time and switches narrative perspectives in a Rashomon-style exploring family and amorous ties. It postulates a fatalistic world bound by family origins and romantic longings in which every character is trapped into becoming a thief of one kind or another, emotionally as well as existentially. This film earned Téchiné nominations for the César and Golden Palme at Cannes, as well as a host of other honors.

=== Alice et Martin (1998) ===
Téchiné followed this success with Alice et Martin (Alice and Martin) (1998), a haunting love story between two emotionally damaged outsiders that marked his reunion with Juliette Binoche. As in his earlier film Les Voleurs, Téchiné told the story out of sequence.

=== Loin (2001) ===
Loin (Far) (2001) was shot on digital video. Employing natural light for the most part, it uses a slightly degraded video image to create a sense of collapse and unease. The film is set in Tangier and is told in three "movements", with the sections marked by chapters. The plot turns around three characters: a truck driver importing goods between Morocco and France tempted to cross the strait to Spain smuggling drugs; his young Arab friend desperate to go to Europe; and the driver's Jewish ex-girlfriend who is hesitant about her future migration to Canada. During the three days they are together, fateful decisions must be made.

=== Strayed (2003) ===
After two less successful ventures, André Téchiné received acclaim with Strayed (Les Égarés) (2003), an adaptation of the novel Le Garçon aux yeux gris, by Gilles Perrault. While Téchiné usually braids together several intersecting stories, this wartime drama traces a single linear tale with only four characters. In 1940, an attractive widow flees Nazi-occupied Paris for the South with her small daughter and teenage son; they are soon joined by a mysterious young man. The foursome find refuge from the war in an abandoned house.

=== Changing Times (2004) ===
Changing Times (Les Temps qui changent) (2004) is an exploration of cultural collision in contemporary Morocco, oscillating between two worlds and two ideas about the meaning of experience and the enduring power of love. A middle age construction supervisor comes to Tangier to search for the love of his youth, lost many years ago. She is now married and with a grown up son. They eventually cross paths in a supermarket. Téchiné weaves together a half dozen subplots, creating a set of variations on the theme of divided sensibilities tugging one another into states of perpetual unrest and possible happiness.

=== Les Témoins (2007) ===
Les Témoins (The Witnesses) deals with a group of friends and lovers confronting the AIDS epidemic in the 1980s. Mehdi, a French-Arab vice cop, is in an open marriage with Sarah, a writer of children's books who finds herself unable to bond with her newborn child. Sarah's best friend, Adrien, a middle-aged doctor, is infatuated with Manu, a narcissistic young man, who has recently arrived in Paris from the South. There is also the story line of Julie, Manu's opera singer sister, and Sandra, Manu's hooker friend. The film is filled with color, life, and emotion until the AIDS epidemic disrupts the characters' lives. Les Témoins received wide critical acclaim and brought Téchiné a level of international attention he had not received since the success of his films Wild Reeds and Les Voleurs.

=== The Girl on the Train (2009) ===
The Girl on the Train (La Fille du RER), centers on a naive girl who fabricates a story about being attacked on a suburban Paris train by black and Arab youths who supposedly mistook her for a Jew. The story is based on a real event that took place in France in 2004. Téchiné dissects the psychological circumstances and consequences surrounding this bold lie in a rich drama. The director worked, in part, from Jean Marie Besset's play about the scandal, RER, as well as from news reports and court records. "The story became the mirror of all French fears", Téchiné commented, "a revelation of what we call the 'collective unconscious.' How an individual's lie is transformed into truth with respect to the community at large and its fears. It's a truly fascinating subject."

=== Impardonnables (2011) ===
Set in Venice and adapted from a Philippe Djian's novel, Unforgivable (Impardonnables) follows Francis, an aging successful writer of crime novels, married to a much younger ex-model. While suffering from writer's block, he hires his wife's lesbian ex-lover to investigate the disappearance of his adult daughter from a previous marriage who had eloped while visiting Venice. As his marriage begins to crumble, Francis pays the detective's troubled son to secretly follow his wife's daily whereabouts.

=== In the Name of My Daughter (2014) ===
Like The Girl on the Train, In the Name of My Daughter (L'Homme que l'on aimait trop), is a fictionalized account of true events. In this case, the before and aftermath of the disappearance of a casino heiress, Agnès Le Roux, in 1977. The plot mixes amour fou, mafia wars, dysfunctional mother-daughter relationship and courtroom drama. The world of the French Riviera's casinos and the mafia wars in the 1970s are the background in this retelling of a case that made headlines in France.

The film, based on the memoir Une femme face à la Mafia written by Agnès Le Roux's mother and brother, marked the 7th collaboration between André Téchiné and Catherine Deneuve.

== Political views ==
In December 2023, alongside 50 other filmmakers, Téchiné signed an open letter published in Libération demanding a ceasefire and an end to the killing of civilians amid the 2023 Israeli invasion of the Gaza Strip, and for a humanitarian corridor into Gaza to be established for humanitarian aid, and the release of hostages.

In February 2024 Francis Renaud accused Téchiné of having sexually harassed him.

== Filmography ==
Year	English title	Original title	Notes
1969	Paulina is Leaving	Paulina s'en va	Original script
1975	French Provincial	Souvenirs d'en France	Original script
1976	Barocco	Barocco	César Award: Best Cinematography; César Award: Best Music Written for a Film; César Award: Best Supporting Actress (Marie-France Pisier)
1979	The Bronte Sisters	Les Sœurs Brontë	
1981	Hotel America	Hôtel des Amériques	
1983	La Matiouette ou l'Arrière-pays	La Matiouette	
1985	Rendez-vous	Rendez-vous	Cannes Film Festival: Award for Best Director; César Award: Most Promising Actor (Wadeck Stanczak)
1986	The Scene of the Crime	Le Lieu du crime	
1987	The Innocents	Les Innocents	César Award: Best Supporting Actor (Jean-Claude Brialy)
1991	I Don't Kiss	J'embrasse pas	Nominated—César Award for Best Director; César Award: Most Promising Actor (Manuel Blanc)
1993	My Favorite Season	Ma saison préférée	Original script: Boston Society of Film Critics Awards : Best Foreign Language Film
1994	Wild Reeds	Les Roseaux sauvages	Original script: César Award: Best Film; César Award: Best Director; César Award: Best Original Screenplay or Adaptation; César Award: Most Promising Actress (Élodie Bouchez); Los Angeles Film Critics Association: Best Foreign Language Film; National Society of Film Critics (US): Best Foreign Language Film; New York Film Critics : Best Foreign Language Film
1996	Thieves	Les Voleurs	Original script
1998	Alice and Martin	Alice et Martin	Original script
2001	Far	Loin	Original script
2003	Strayed	Les Égarés	Loosely based on Gilles Perrault's novel The Boy With Grey Eyes
2004	Changing Times	Les Temps qui changent	Original script
2007	The Witnesses	Les Témoins	Original script: Nominated—César Award for Best Director; César Award: Best Supporting Actor (Sami Bouajila)
2009	The Girl on the Train	La Fille du RER	Loosely based on Jean-Marie Besset's 2006 play RER
2011	Impardonnables	Unforgivable	Based on Philippe Djian's novel Unforgivable
2014	In the Name of My Daughter	L'Homme que l'on aimait trop	
2016	Being 17	Quand on a 17 ans	Nominated—Berlin International Film Festival - Golden Bear
2017	Golden Years	Nos années folles	
2019	Farewell to the Night	L'Adieu à la nuit	
2023	Soul Mates	Les Âmes sœurs	
2024	My New Friends	Les Gens d’à côté	World premiere at the 74th Berlin International Film Festival

== Frequent casting ==
Actor	Paulina is Leaving (1969)	French Provincial (1975)	Barocco (1976)	The Bronte Sisters (1979)	Hotel America (1981)	Rendez-vous (1985)	The Scene of the Crime (1986)	The Innocents (1987)	I Don't Kiss (1991)	My Favorite Season (1993)	Wild Reeds (1994)	Thieves (1996)	Alice and Martin (1998)	Far (2001)	Strayed (2003)	Changing Times (2004)	The Witnesses (2007)	The Girl on the Train (2009)	Impardonnables (2011)	In the Name of My Daughter (2014)
Emmanuelle Béart									check						check		check			
Catherine Deneuve					check		check			check		check				check		check		check
Jacques Nolot					check	check		check		check	check						check			
Marie-France Pisier	check	check	check	check																
Marthe Villalonga								check		check			check							
