= On My Way (film) =

2013 film

- Film poster
- Directed by: Emmanuelle Bercot
- Written by: Emmanuelle Bercot; Jérôme Tonnerre
- Produced by: Olivier Delbosc; Marc Missonnier
- Starring: Catherine Deneuve
- Cinematography: Guillaume Schiffman
- Edited by: Julien Leloup
- Distributed by: Wild Bunch
- Release dates: 15 February 2013 (Berlin); 14 June 2013 (France)
- Running time: 116 minute
- Country: France
- Language: French
- Budget: $6.6 million
- Box office: $5.5 million

On My Way (French: Elle s'en va) is a 2013 French comedy-drama film directed by Emmanuelle Bercot. The film premiered in competition at the 63rd Berlin International Film Festival.

== Plot ==
Bettie (Deneuve), a harried restaurant owner from Brittany, is an aging former beauty queen with an estranged adult daughter and grandson and an elderly mother who meddles in her life. She loves a married businessman who always told her he would divorce his wife in order to marry her. He indeed files for a divorce, but Bettie discovers that it is actually because he is also having another affair with another much-younger woman. At about the same time, the bank threatens to close down her restaurant.

When she goes out to run some errands, she impulsively decides to leave her former life behind. She takes her car and just keeps on driving. She discovers other parts of France and makes new friends in the process.

== Cast ==
- Catherine Deneuve as Bettie
- Gérard Garouste as Alan
- Camille as Muriel
- Mylène Demongeot as Fanfan
- Claude Gensac as Annie
- Paul Hamy as Marco
- Hafsia Herzi as Jeanne
- Valérie Lagrange as Miss Mayenne 1969
- Évelyne Leclercq as Miss Champagne 1969

== Production ==
Principal photography began from 14 May 2012.

== Reception ==
On My Way received generally positive reviews from critics. On Rotten Tomatoes, the film has a rating of 80% based on 41 reviews and an average rating of 6.50/10. The site's consensus reads, "While the script may not always be worthy of her gifts, Catherine Deneuve's performance ultimately offers more than enough reason to watch On My Way.". On Metacritic, the film has a score of 60 out of 100 based on 17 reviews, indicating "mixed or average reviews".

Jordan Mintzer titled his review in The Hollywood Reporter "Catherine Deneuve hits the road in this rocky third feature from actress-filmmaker Emmanuelle Bercot" and resumed On My Way (Elle s'en va) was "a film that's much more bouillabaisse than haute cuisine".

== Accolades ==
Award / Film Festival	Category	Recipients and nominees	Result
Berlin Film Festival	Golden Bear		Nominated
Cabourg Film Festival	Coup de Cœur	Catherine Deneuve	Won
César Awards	Best Actress	Catherine Deneuve	Nominated
César Awards	Most Promising Actor	Nemo Schiffman	Nominated
Louis Delluc Prize	Best Film		Nominated
Lumière Awards	Best Actress	Catherine Deneuve	Nominated
