= Thieves (1996 film) =

1996 film

Thieves (Les Voleurs)
- Theatrical release poster
- Directed by: André Téchiné
- Written by: André Téchiné; Gilles Taurand; Michel Alexandre; Pascal Bonitzer (collaboration)
- Produced by: Alain Sarde
- Starring: Daniel Auteuil; Catherine Deneuve; Laurence Côte
- Cinematography: Jeanne Lapoirie
- Edited by: Martine Giordano
- Music by: Philippe Sarde
- Distributed by: BAC Films
- Release dates: May 1996 (Cannes); 21 August 1996 (France)
- Running time: 117 minutes
- Country: France
- Language: French
- Budget: 8.400.000 €
- Box office: $17,145,357

Thieves (French: Les Voleurs) is a 1996 French drama film in film noir style, directed by André Téchiné, starring Daniel Auteuil, Catherine Deneuve and Laurence Côte. The plot follows a cynical police officer, who comes from a family of thieves, and a lonely philosophy professor, both romantically involved with a self-destructive petty criminal. With a puzzling structure, the story is told through a series of flashbacks presented from four different perspectives.

== Plot ==
Justin, a boy who is living in a small town in the Rhône-Alpes region, is awaken in the middle of the night. His mother, Mireille is crying and his widower grandfather, Victor, tells the boy that his father, Ivan, is dead. The next day, Alex, Justin's uncle and Ivan's little brother, arrives for the funeral accompanied by a woman, Juliette. Justin notice the tension between people. He takes his father's gun and hides it. The story flashes backward and forward to explain what led up to Ivan's death.

Alex, who has rebelled against his family by becoming a cop, works in the deprived La Duchere district of Lyon. He begins with his encounter, a year before Ivan's death, when he first meets Juliette, who is brought to his office when she was arrested for shoplifting. He lets her off. He sees her again one day when he visits the sleazy nightclub run by his big brother, Ivan. Ivan is a crime boss and runs a popular club with a drag revue, funding his business through a stolen-auto ring headed up by Jimmy, who is Juliette's brother. The encounter between the siblings on opposite sides of the law is tense, they barely get along. Ivan is happy to show Alex that he is doing much better than him on the wrong side of the law. After their second encounter Alex and Juliette start a tortured affair beginning to meet regularly for sex. He is not in love with her, and their relationship is complicated by the girl's emotional and sexual involvement with Marie, a professor of philosophy. Alex spies on Marie. Ivan hears about Juliette's relationship with Alex and threatens her. Ivan and his gang, including Juliette, plan the theft of cars in a railway deposit.

The heist at the railway marshaling yard goes disastrously wrong when Ivan is shot dead, along with a security guard. Juliette, who had been coerced into participating, against Jimmy's wishes, is distraught by Ivan's death. Emotional imbalance and self-destructive, Juliette tries to commit suicide twice, first while staying with her brother and later while visiting Marie, after Ivan's death. Marie has her interned in a psychiatric hospital to recuperate. Alex asks Marie for the address of Juliette's clinic, but she has disappeared. In search of Juliette, Marie visits her housing estate apartment. After Ivan's cremation, Alex makes an effort to connect with his nephew without much success. At a local fair, Justin threatens Alex with an air-rifle. Justin learns the truth about his father's death from his grandfather Victor.

Marie visits Alex, who tells her Juliette was involved in the heist and that he is trying to find her. Alex and Marie develop an uneasy friendship as they bid, from a distance, to protect Juliette. Later Alex visits Marie and finds she has become a recluse, writing a book about Juliette. He tells her Juliette is safe because the police are looking for a boy. Later Alex hears that Marie has committed suicide as he receives her manuscript and the tapes of Juliette's voice in the post. Alex goes to see Juliette in Marseille, but leaves her alone when he sees she is well from a distance. She has built a new life for herself and works in a bookshop. Justin has taken after his father and grandfather and does not like his uncle. By contrast, Justin gets along very well with Jimmy. Jimmy decides to marry Ivan's widow, Mireille.

== Cast ==
- Daniel Auteuil as Alex
- Catherine Deneuve as Marie Leblanc
- Laurence Côte as Juliette Fontana
- Benoît Magimel as Jimmy Fontana
- Didier Bezace as Ivan
- Julien Rivière as Justin
- Ivan Desny as Victor
- Fabienne Babe as Mireille
- Régis Betoule as Régis
- Pierre Perez as Fred
- Naguime Bendidi as Nabil

== Production ==
Les Voleurs (Thieves) was directed by André Téchiné in the style of film noir. Its fragmented structure has been compared to a William Faulkner's novel, particularly to The Sound and the Fury (1929). The narrative — consisting of a prologue, five sections, and an epilogue — leaps around in time and switches between the viewpoints of Justin, Alex, Marie, and Juliette. The Sound and the Fury unfolds over four days, likewise, switching narrative perspectives. Both The Sound and the Fury and Thieves also have a central female character who is loved obsessively by two of the narrators: Faulkner's novel has Caddie, who is loved by her brothers Benjy and Quentin, and Téchiné's film has Juliette, who is the love interest of both Alex and Marie. The divided time structure emphasize the interlapping relationships between the characters.

Principal photography took place from 6 Feb 1995 to 16 Sep 1995.

=== Music ===
The original score for the film was written by Philippe Sarde, regular composer in Téchiné's films. The sound track includes an eclectic mix of artist and styles like : Cheb Mami, Liza Minnelli, The Archies and Mozart.

- Douha Alia Cheb Mami
- Baadini Rachid Taha
- Sous le soleil de Bodega Les Négresses Vertes
- Sugar Sugar The Archies
- The Magic Flute Wolfgang Amadeus Mozart
- Tonite Les Rita Mitsouko
- La Valse Petite La Tordue

== Release ==
The film premiered in May 1996 at the 49th Cannes Film Festival. It was released in France on 21 August 1996 and in the United States on 25 December that same year.

== Reception ==
Thieves received widespread praise from film critics. It is generally considered, with My Favorite Season and Wild Reeds, among Téchiné's best films. Review aggregate Rotten Tomatoes reports that 82% of 11 critics have given the film a positive review, holding an average score of 7/10.

On line film critic James Berardinelli called the film "strong and keenly-insightful ". Roger Ebert from the Chicago Sun-Times wrote that "Téchiné involves us in a subtle, gradual process of discovery; each piece changes the relationship of the others. He is so wise about these criminals, he makes the bad guys in most American films look like cartoon characters."

In USA Today Mike Clark commented that in Thieves “Deneuve gives one of her best performances ever, though she's not exactly the movie's focus. Of the many pleasures here, one is trying to guess just who the dramatic focal point is". Janet Maslin in The New York Times reported that in the film "Téchiné explores the intricate connections among these characters with a somber, penetrating wisdom that is the film's main reward." Jonathan Rosenbaum from Chicago Reader called the film "a Masterpiece"

== Accolades ==
The film received five nominations in the Cesar Awards, including the categories of Best Film, Best Director, Best Actress (Catherine Deneuve), Best Young Actor (Benoît Magimel) and Best Young Actress (Laurence Côte). It won only in the last category.

Benoît Magimel received the Prix Michel Simon as Best Actor for his performance.

== Home media ==
The film was released on DVD on 4 March 2011 in the United States by Sony Pictures as a DVD-R manufactured on demand. The film is in French with incorporated English subtitles. Les Voleurs is also available in Region 2 DVD.
