= 24th César Awards =

1999 French film awards ceremony

- Date: 6 March 1999
- Site: Théâtre des Champs-Élysées, Paris, France
- Hosted by: Antoine de Caunes

Highlights
- Best Film: The Dreamlife of Angels
- Best Actor: Jacques Villeret
- Best Actress: Élodie Bouchez

Television coverage
- Network: Canal+

The 24th César Awards ceremony, presented by the Académie des Arts et Techniques du Cinéma, honoured the best French films of 1998 and took place on 6 March 1999 at the Théâtre des Champs-Élysées in Paris. The ceremony was chaired by Isabelle Huppert and hosted by Antoine de Caunes. The Dreamlife of Angels won the award for Best Film.

== Winners and nominees ==
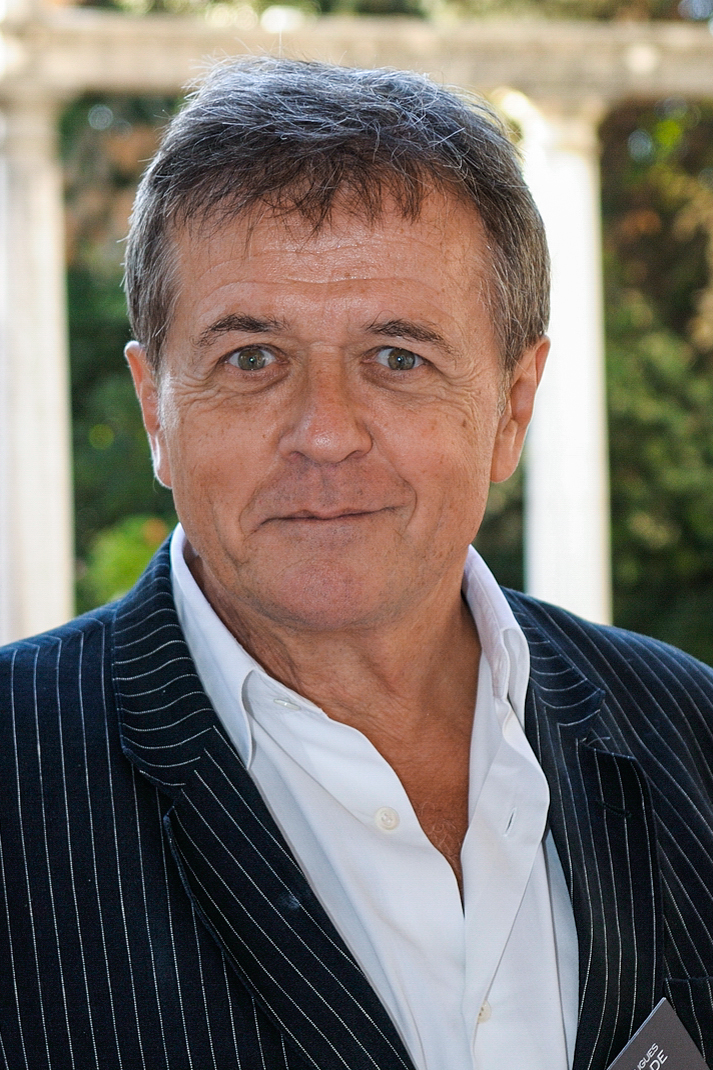
Patrice Chéreau, Best Director winner

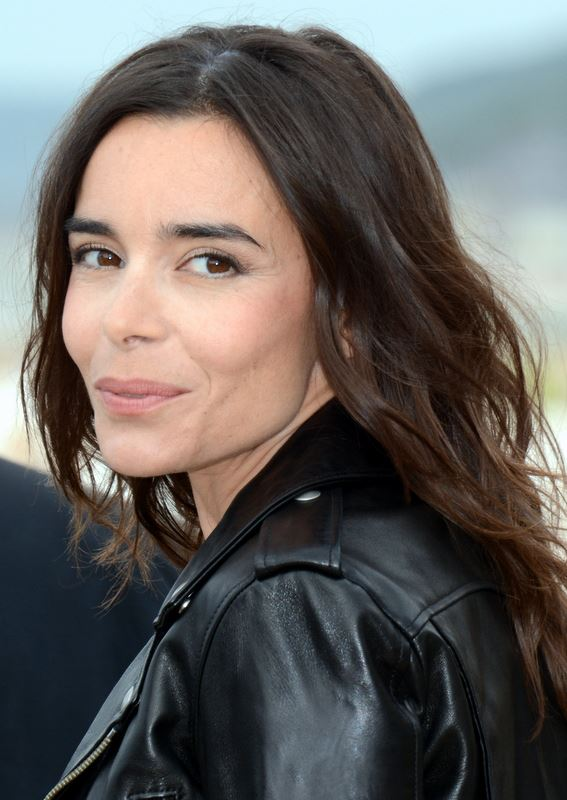
Élodie Bouchez, Best Actress winner

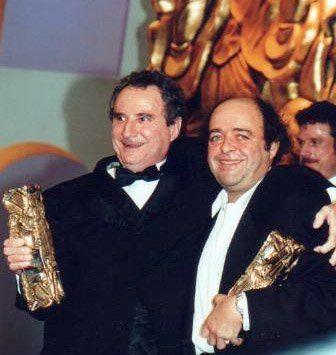
Daniel Prévost (left), Best Supporting Actor winner and Jacques Villeret, Best Actor winner

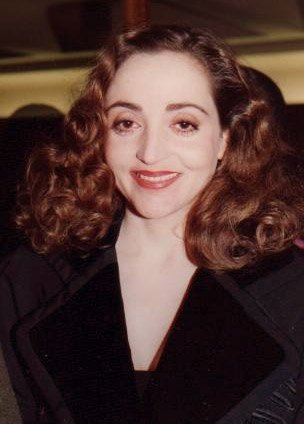
Dominique Blanc, Best Supporting Actress winner

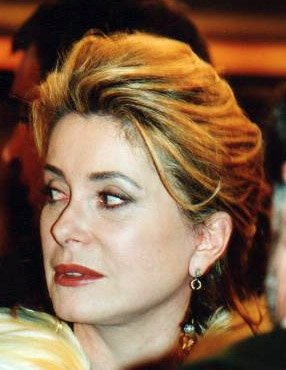
Catherine Deneuve, Best Actress nominee

Best Film The Dreamlife of Angels: The Dinner Game; Place Vendôme; Taxi; Those Who Love Me Can Take the Train	Best Director Patrice Chéreau – Those Who Love Me Can Take the Train: Francis Veber – The Dinner Game; Nicole Garcia – Place Vendôme; Gérard Pirès – Taxi; Erick Zonca – The Dreamlife of Angels
Best Actor Jacques Villeret – The Dinner Game: Charles Berling – L'Ennui; Antoine de Caunes – Man Is a Woman; Jean-Pierre Darroussin – Le Poulpe; Pascal Greggory – Those Who Love Me Can Take the Train	Best Actress Élodie Bouchez – The Dreamlife of Angels: Catherine Deneuve – Place Vendôme; Isabelle Huppert – The School of Flesh; Sandrine Kiberlain – For Sale; Marie Trintignant – White Lies
Best Supporting Actor Daniel Prévost – The Dinner Game: Jacques Dutronc – Place Vendôme; Bernard Fresson – Place Vendôme; Vincent Pérez – Those Who Love Me Can Take the Train; Jean-Louis Trintignant – Those Who Love Me Can Take the Train	Best Supporting Actress Dominique Blanc – Those Who Love Me Can Take the Train: Anémone – Lautrec; Arielle Dombasle – L'Ennui; Catherine Frot – The Dinner Game; Emmanuelle Seigner – Place Vendôme
Most Promising Actor Bruno Putzulu – Petits désordres amoureux: Lionel Abelanski – Train of Life; Guillaume Canet – In All Innocence; Romain Duris – The Crazy Stranger; Samy Naceri – Taxi	Most Promising Actress Natacha Régnier – The Dreamlife of Angels: Marion Cotillard – Taxi; Hélène de Fougerolles – Let There Be Light; Sophie Guillemin – L'Ennui; Rona Hartner – The Crazy Stranger
Best Original Screenplay or Adaptation The Dinner Game – Francis Veber: Those Who Love Me Can Take the Train – Patrice Chéreau, Danièle Thompson and Pierre Trividic; Place Vendôme – Jacques Fieschi and Nicole Garcia; Train of Life – Radu Mihăileanu; The Dreamlife of Angels – Roger Bohbot and Erick Zonca	Best First Feature Film Only God Sees Me: The Dreamlife of Angels; Hinterland; The Perfect Guy; The Kid from Chaaba
Best Cinematography Eric Gautier – Those Who Love Me Can Take the Train: Agnès Godard – The Dreamlife of Angels; Laurent Dailland – Place Vendôme	Best Editing Véronique Lange – Taxi: Luc Barnier and Françoise Bonnot – Place Vendôme; François Gédigier – Those Who Love Me Can Take the Train
Best Sound Vincent Arnardi and Vincent Tulli – Taxi: Jean-Pierre Duret and Dominique Hennequin – Place Vendôme; Jean-Pierre Laforce and Guillaume Sciama – Those Who Love Me Can Take the Train	Best Original Music Tony Gatlif – The Crazy Stranger: Claude Bolling and Francis Lai – Chance or Coincidence; Philippe Miller – The Perfect Guy; IAM – Taxi
Best Costume Design Pierre-Jean Larroque – Lautrec: Sylvie de Segonzac – Don Juan; Nathalie du Roscoat and Elisabeth Tavernier – Place Vendôme	Best Production Design Jacques Rouxel – Lautrec: Thierry Flamand – Place Vendôme; Sylvain Chauvelot and Richard Peduzzi – Those Who Love Me Can Take the Train
Best Short Film L'Interview: La Vieille Barrière; The Clothes Pegs; Tueurs de petits poissons; La Vache qui voulait sauter par dessus l'église	Best Foreign Film Life Is Beautiful: Festen; Central Station; Saving Private Ryan; Titanic
Honorary César Pedro Almodóvar; Johnny Depp; Jean Rochefort

== See also ==
- 71st Academy Awards
- 52nd British Academy Film Awards
- 11th European Film Awards
- 4th Lumière Awards
