= 1998 Cannes Film Festival =

- Official poster of the 51st Cannes Film Festival
- Opening film: Primary Colors
- Closing film: Godzilla
- Location: Cannes, France
- Founded: 1946
- Awards: Palme d'Or: Eternity and a Day
- Hosted by: Isabelle Huppert
- No. of films: 22 (In Competition)
- Festival date: 13 May 1998 – 24 May 1998
- Website: festival-cannes.com/en

Cannes Film Festival
- 1999 1997

The 51st Cannes Film Festival took place from 13 to 24 May 1998. American filmmaker Martin Scorsese served as jury president for the main competition. Isabelle Huppert was the host for the opening and closing ceremonies.

Greek filmmaker Theo Angelopoulos won the Palme d'Or, the festival's top prize, for the drama film Eternity and a Day.

The festival opened with Primary Colors by Mike Nichols, and closed with Godzilla by Roland Emmerich. Two new sections were added to the Official Selection: the Un Certain Regard and the Cinéfondation.

1998 Un Certain Regard poster, an original illustration by Kang Woohyun.

== Juries ==
=== Main competition ===
- Martin Scorsese, American filmmaker and producer - Jury President
- Alain Corneau, French filmmaker
- Chiara Mastroianni, French actress
- Chen Kaige, Chinese filmmaker
- Lena Olin, Swedish actress
- Winona Ryder, American actress
- MC Solaar, French singer
- Zoé Valdés, Cuban filmmaker and author
- Sigourney Weaver, American actress
- Michael Winterbottom, British filmmaker

=== Un Certain Regard ===
- Jacques Mandelbaum, French journalist - Jury President
- Thierry Gandillot
- Luc Honorez
- Pierre Murat

=== Cinéfondation and Short Films Competition ===
- Jean-Pierre Jeunet, French filmmaker - Jury President
- Emmanuelle Béart, French actress
- Arnaud Desplechin, French filmmaker
- Jaco Van Dormael, Belgian filmmaker
- Ángela Molina, Spanish actress

=== Camera d'Or ===
- Trần Anh Hùng, Vietnamese-French filmmaker - Jury President
- Derek Malcolm, British film critic
- Bernard Maltaverne
- Marcel Martin, film critic
- Emanuela Martini, film critic
- Jacques Poitrenaud, French director and actor
- Pierre Salvadori, French filmmaker
- Charles Van Damme, Belgian cinematographer

== Official Selection ==
=== In Competition ===
The following feature films competed for the Palme d'Or:

English title	Original title	Director(s)	Production country
April	Aprile	Nanni Moretti	Italy
The Celebration	Festen	Thomas Vinterberg	Denmark
Claire Dolan		Lodge Kerrigan	United States, France
Class Trip	La classe de neige	Claude Miller	France
Dance Me to My Song		Rolf de Heer	Australia
The Dreamlife of Angels	La vie rêvée des anges	Erick Zonca	France
Eternity and a Day	Μια αιωνιότητα και μια μέρα	Theo Angelopoulos	Greece
Fear and Loathing in Las Vegas		Terry Gilliam	United States
Flowers of Shanghai	海上花	Hou Hsiao-hsien	Taiwan
Foolish Heart	Corazón iluminado	Héctor Babenco	Argentina, Brazil, France
The General		John Boorman	Ireland, United Kingdom
The Hole	洞	Tsai Ming-liang	Taiwan
Henry Fool		Hal Hartley	United States
The Idiots	Idioterne	Lars von Trier	Denmark, France, Italy, Netherlands, Spain, Sweden
Illuminata		John Turturro	United States
Khrustalyov, My Car!	Хрусталёв, машину!	Aleksei German	Russia, France
Life Is Beautiful	La vita è bella	Roberto Benigni	Italy
My Name Is Joe		Ken Loach	United Kingdom
The Rose Seller	La vendedora de rosas	Víctor Gaviria	Colombia
The School of Flesh	L'école de la chair	Benoît Jacquot	France
Those Who Love Me Can Take the Train	Ceux qui m'aiment prendront le train	Patrice Chéreau	France
Velvet Goldmine		Todd Haynes	United Kingdom, United States

=== Un Certain Regard ===
The following films were selected for the competition of Un Certain Regard:

English title	Original title	Director(s)	Production country
All the Little Animals		Jeremy Thomas	United Kingdom
The Apostle		Robert Duvall	United States
The Apple	سیب	Samira Makhmalbaf	Iran
August 32nd on Earth	Un 32 août sur terre	Denis Villeneuve	Canada
El evangelio de las maravillas		Arturo Ripstein	Mexico
For Sale	À vendre	Laetitia Masson	France
The Impostors		Stanley Tucci	United States
In the Presence of a Clown	Larmar och gör sig till	Ingmar Bergman	Sweden
Island, Alicia		Ken Yunome	United States
Killer	Киллер	Darezhan Omirbaev	Kazakhstan, France
Leaf on a Pillow	Daun di Atas Bantal	Garin Nugroho	Indonesia
Little Tony	Kleine Teun	Alex van Warmerdam	Netherlands
Louise (Take 2)		Siegfried	France
Love Is the Devil: Study for a Portrait of Francis Bacon		John Maybury	United Kingdom
Lulu on the Bridge		Paul Auster	United States
The Man Who Couldn't Open Doors		Paul Arden	United Kingdom
The Mutants	Os mutantes	Teresa Villaverde	Portugal
One Evening After the War	រាត្រីមួយក្រោយសង្គ្រាម	Rithy Panh	Cambodia, France
Passion	Szenvedély	György Fehér	Hungary
Places in Cities	Plätze in Städten	Angela Schanelec	Germany
The Power of Kangwon Province	강원도의 힘	Hong Sang-soo	South Korea
Rehearsals for War	Teatro di guerra	Mario Martone	Italy
River of Gold	O Rio do Ouro	Paulo Rocha	Portugal
The Shoe	Kurpe	Laila Pakalniņa	Germany, Latvia
Tell Me I'm Dreaming	Dis-moi que je rêve	Claude Mouriéras	France
Tokyo Eyes		Jean-Pierre Limosin	France, Japan
Zero Effect		Jake Kasdan	United States

=== Out of Competition ===
The following films were selected to be screened out of competition:

English title	Original title	Director(s)	Production country
Blues Brothers 2000		John Landis	United States
Godzilla (closing film)		Roland Emmerich	United States
Primary Colors (opening film)		Mike Nichols	United States

=== Special Screenings ===
The following films were selected to receive a Special Screening:

English title	Original title	Director(s)	Production country
Anxiety	Inquietude	Manoel de Oliveira	Portugal
Dark City		Alex Proyas	United States, Australia
Goodbye Lover		Roland Joffé	United States, Germany
Dr. Akagi	カンゾー先生	Shohei Imamura	Japan
Tango	Tango, no me dejes nunca	Carlos Saura	Argentina, Spain

=== Cinéfondation ===
The following films were selected for the competition of Cinéfondation:

- Blue City by David Birdsell
- Deer Men by Saara Saarela
- Die Weiche by Chrys Krikellis
- Doom and Gloom by John McKay
- The First Sin by Fahimeh Sorkhabi
- Inside the Boxes by Mirjam Kubescha
- Jakub by Adam Guzinski
- Mud (Kal) by Ivaylo P. Simidchiev
- Mangwana by Manu Kurewa
- One Eye by Liana Dognini
- The Photographer (Fotograf) by Alexander Kott
- The Rose of the Railroad (Ratapenkan Ruusu) by Hanna Maylett
- The Sheep Thief by Asif Kapadia
- Summer-Time (Léto - cas dlouhých letu) by Ramunas Greicius
- Wild Paths (Sentieri selvaggi) by Susanna Grigoletto

=== Short Films Competition ===
The following short films competed for the Short Film Palme d'Or:

- 9'8 M/S2 by Alfonso Amador, Nicolas Mendez
- Balkanska Ruleta by Zdravko Barisic
- Enfant, Gribouillage, Photos de Famille by Jun-hong Lin
- Fetch by Lynn-Maree Danzey
- Gasman by Lynne Ramsay
- Happy Birthday to Me by Martin Mahon
- Horseshoe by David Lodge
- I Want You by Gregory Quail
- Kiyida by Ebru Yapici
- L'Interview by Xavier Giannoli
- Skate by Eun-Ryung Cho

== Parallel sections ==
=== International Critics' Week ===
The following films were screened for the 37th International Critics' Week (37e Semaine de la Critique):

Feature film competition

- The Bed (Postel) by Oskar Reif (Czech Republic)
- Christmas in August by Hur Jin-Ho (South Korea)
- I Stand Alone (Seul contre tous) by Gaspar Noé (France)
- Memory & Desire by Niki Caro (New Zealand)
- The Polish Bride (De Poolse bruid)) by Karim Traïdia (Netherlands)
- Sitcom by François Ozon (France)
- Torrente, el brazo tonto de la ley by Santiago Segura (Spain)

Short film competition

- Brutalos by Christophe Billeter, David Leroy (Switzerland)
- Down, Across (Loddrett, Vannrett) by Erland Øverby (Norway)
- Flight by Sim Sadler (United States)
- Der Hausbesorger by Stephan Wagner (Austria)
- Milk by Andrea Arnold (United Kingdom)
- Por un infante difunto by Tinieblas González (Spain)
- The Rogers’ Cable by Jennifer Kierans (Canada)

=== Directors' Fortnight ===
The following films were screened for the 1998 Directors' Fortnight (Quinzaine des Réalizateurs):

- Babyface by Jack Blum
- Cantique de la racaille by Vincent Ravalec
- Chacun pour soi by Bruno Bontzolakis
- Disparus by Gilles Bourdos
- Happiness by Todd Solondz
- Head On by Ana Kokkinos
- High Art by Lisa Cholodenko
- Hinterland (L’Arrière pays) by Jacques Nolot
- L’homme qui rit by Paul Leni
- Laisse un peu d'amour by Zaïda Ghorab-Volta
- Last Night by Don McKellar
- Le Nain rouge by Yvan Le Moine
- Notes of Love (La Parola amore esiste) by Mimmo Calopresti
- Of Freaks and Men (Pro urodov i lyudey) by Alexeï Balabanov
- Requiem by Alain Tanner
- Slam by Marc Levin
- Slums Of Beverly Hills by Tamara Jenkins
- Spring In My Hometown by Kwangmo Lee
- The Stringer by Paul Pawlikowski
- La Vie Sur Terre by Abderrahmane Sissako
- West Beyrouth by Ziad Doueiri

Short films

- A table by Idit Cébula (19 min.)
- Le Bleu du ciel by Christian Dor (25 min.)
- Open Bodies (Les corps ouverts) by Sébastien Lifshitz (47 min.)
- Electrons statiques by Jean-Marc Moutout (25 min.)
- Les Pinces à linge by Joël Brisse (23 min.)
- Rue bleue by Chad Chenouga (24 min.)

== Official Awards ==
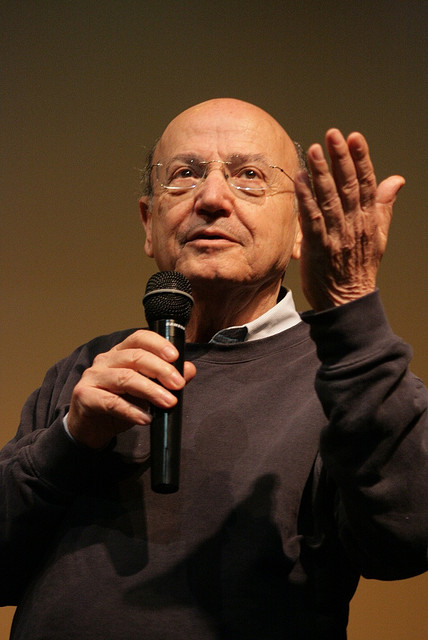
Theodoros Angelopoulos, winner of the Palme d'Or at the event.

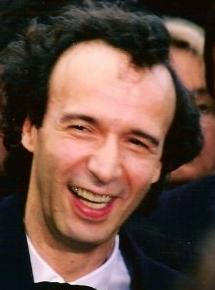
Roberto Benigni, Gran Prix winner

The following films and people received the 1998 Official selection awards:

=== In Competition ===
- Palme d'Or: Eternity and a Day by Theodoros Angelopoulos
- Grand Prize of the Jury: Life Is Beautiful by Roberto Benigni
- Best Director: John Boorman for The General
- Best Screenplay: Henry Fool by Hal Hartley
- Best Actress: Élodie Bouchez and Natacha Régnier for The Dreamlife of Angels
- Best Actor: Peter Mullan for My Name Is Joe
- Best Artistic Contribution: Velvet Goldmine by Todd Haynes
- Jury Prize:
  - The Celebration by Thomas Vinterberg
  - Class Trip by Claude Miller

=== Un Certain Regard ===
- Killer by Darezhan Omirbaev

=== Cinéfondation ===
- First Prize: Jakub by Adam Guzinski
- Second Prize: The Sheep Thief by Asif Kapadia
- Third Prize: Mangwana by Manu Kurewa

=== Caméra d'Or ===
- Slam by Marc Levin

=== Short Film Palme d'Or ===
- L'interview by Xavier Giannoli
- Jury Prize:
  - Horseshoe by David Lodge
  - Gasman by Lynne Ramsay

== Independent awards ==
=== FIPRESCI Prizes ===
- The Hole by Tsai Ming-liang (In competition)
- Happiness by Todd Solondz (Directors' Fortnight)

=== Commission Supérieure Technique ===
- Technical Grand Prize: Vittorio Storaro (cinematography) in Tango

=== Prize of the Ecumenical Jury ===
- Eternity and a Day by Theodoros Angelopoulos
- Ecumenical Jury - Special Award: Ingmar Bergman

=== Award of the Youth ===
- Foreign Film: Last Night by Don McKellar
- French Film: Hinterland by Jacques Nolot

=== International Critics' Week ===
- Mercedes-Benz Award: I Stand Alone by Gaspar Noé
- Canal+ Award: Por un infante difunto by Tinieblas González
- Grand Golden Rail: The Polish Bride by Karim Traïdia
- Small Golden Rail: Down, Across by Erland Øverby

=== Directors' Fortnight ===
- Kodak Short Film Award:
  - Open Bodies by Sébastien Lifshitz
  - Rue bleue by Chad Chenouga
- Gras Savoye Award: Rue bleue by Chad Chenouga

=== François Chalais Award ===
- West Beyrouth by Ziad Doueiri

== Media ==
- INA: Opening of the 1998 Festival (commentary in French)
- INA: List of prize-winners of the 1998 festival (commentary in French)
