= 11th European Film Awards =

1998 film awards ceremony in London, England

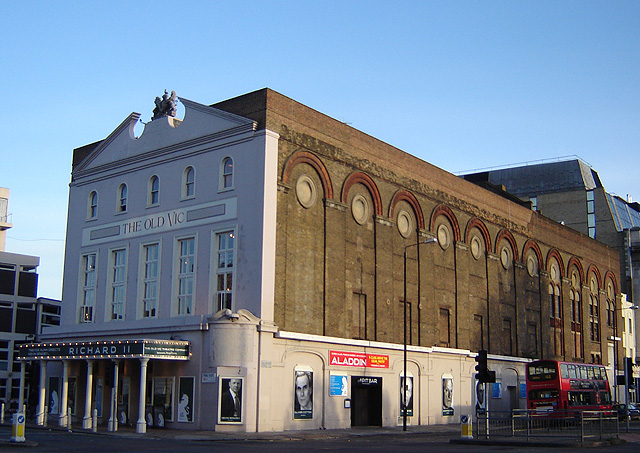
- The exterior of The Old Vic
- Date: 4 December 1998
- Site: Old Vic Theatre, London, United Kingdom
- Hosted by: Mel Smith, Carole Bouquet
- Organized by: European Film Academy

Highlights
- Best Film: Life Is Beautiful
- Best Actor: Roberto Benigni
- Best Actress: Elodie Bouchez and Natacha Regnier

The 11th European Film Awards were presented on 4 December 1998 in London, England.

== Awards ==
=== Best Film ===
English title	Original title	Director(s)	Country
Life Is Beautiful	La vita è bella	Roberto Benigni	Italy
The Butcher Boy		Neil Jordan	Ireland
Live Flesh	Carne trémula	Pedro Almodóvar	Spain
The Celebration	Festen	Thomas Vinterberg	Denmark
The Dreamlife of Angels	La Vie rêvée des anges	Erick Zonca	France
Run Lola Run	Lola rennt	Tom Tykwer	Germany
My Name Is Joe		Ken Loach	United Kingdom
