= Our Paradise =

Our Paradise may refer to:

- Our Paradise (film), a 2011 French film
- Our Paradise (manhwa), a South Korean manhwa released as a webtoon
