= Law & Order: Special Victims Unit season 11 =

Season of American television series

Law & Order: Special Victims Unit
- Season 11
- Season 11 U.S. DVD cover
- Starring: Christopher Meloni; Mariska Hargitay; Richard Belzer; Ice-T; BD Wong; Tamara Tunie; Dann Florek; Stephanie March
- No. of episodes: 24

Release
- Original network: NBC
- Original release: September 23, 2009 – May 19, 2010

Season chronology
- ← Previous; Season 10 Next → Season 12

The eleventh season of Law & Order: Special Victims Unit premiered on September 23, 2009 and concluded on May 19, 2010. It was moved from Tuesdays to Wednesdays at 9 pm/8c ET for the NBC broadcast. On March 3, 2010, SVU returned to its previous time slot of 10pm/9c ET. On January 22, 2010, in the wake of the conflict between Jay Leno and Conan O'Brien, NBC announced that they would order two additional episodes to fill in the gaps of the departing The Jay Leno Show.

== Production ==
NBC ordered production on Season 11 in April 2009. Mick Betancourt became a writer for the eleventh season of SVU having been a long-time fan of the show. He said in an interview that one of his motivations was to "make sure that my episodes as a writer sit on the shelf with the same episodes that made me a fan." In the same interview, he discussed fan fiction and reiterated the policy held by most major networks; "People have tried to send me things and I have to send it back. It's not that I don't like it, it's just that there's a lot of legal gray area there." In 2009, many cast and crew members of SVU began using Twitter to share behind-the-scenes information. According to Betancourt there "seemed to be a gap between the show and the fans and their access to the show, and Twitter really seemed to close it."

The fifth episode "Hardwired" was widely noted for confirming that BD Wong's character George Huang is gay. Neal Baer considered the revelation to be nothing special and summarized "Have the writers always thought he was gay? Yes. Have they avoided saying it? No. It’s sort of been implied. But it doesn’t really come up in the work place unless it comes up." Huang was led to this comment because characters in the episode who tried to lobby in favor of adult-child sexual relationships compared their situation to the persecution of homosexuals. To describe the episode, Baer said "'Is pedophilia hardwired?'... We obviously don’t take the side of the pedophiles, but we do take the side that it’s hard-wired, and [ask] what do you do about it?"

Season 11 was the last full season of Law & Order: Special Victims Unit to shoot in New Jersey. In response to the business they brought to the location, the New Jersey Economic Development Authority awarded SVU more than $10.2 million in tax credits on January 14, 2013. Because of cap restraints, the credits were set to be spread out over two years — $217,000 in 2013 and $10 million in 2014.

== Cast changes and returning characters ==
In May 2009, Christopher Meloni and Mariska Hargitay's contracts expired when they were reportedly making $375K–385K-per episode. During negotiations for a new contract the duo attempted to go after back-end profits. NBC threatened to replace Hargitay and Meloni if "they persist in their demands for more money". After two months of negotiations Meloni and Hargitay opted to renew their contracts for two more seasons.

Christine Lahti played the new executive assistant district attorney, Sonya Paxton, for five episodes, starting with the first episode through to the fourth episode. She returned briefly in the eighth episode, where she clashed with Cabot. Neal Baer said "She's from Appeals and she's tired of having rape cases overturned because of misidentifications. She's coming to clean things up". Stephanie March returned temporarily for 9 episodes starting with the fifth episode playing ADA Alexandra Cabot, while SVU attempted to find a permanent ADA. Sharon Stone joined the cast in the twenty-first episode "Torch" on April 28. She played Jo Marlowe, the new assistant district attorney for a four-episode arc. SVU executive producer Baer described her character as "a funny adrenaline junkie who loves to be in the middle of everything and shares a past with Stabler. She's been married before and has a lot of secrets." She began filming her scenes in March. Her performances were not well received by television critics. Ken Tucker of Entertainment Weekly concluded her first episode as, "an episode filled with such clunky dialogue and improbable details that by the end, she seemed like a 'special victim' herself".

== Cast ==
=== Main cast ===
Christine Lahti as Executive Assistant District Attorney Sonya Paxton

- Christopher Meloni as Senior Detective Elliot Stabler
- Mariska Hargitay as Junior Detective Olivia Benson
- Richard Belzer as Sergeant John Munch
- Ice-T as Junior Detective Odafin "Fin" Tutuola
- BD Wong as FBI Special Agent Dr. George Huang
- Tamara Tunie as Medical Examiner Dr. Melinda Warner
- Dann Florek as Captain Donald "Don" Cragen
- Stephanie March as Assistant District Attorney Alexandra Cabot (episodes 5, 7–8, 10–11, 13–16)

=== Crossover stars from Law & Order ===
- Sam Waterston as District Attorney Jack McCoy

=== Recurring cast ===
Sharon Stone as Assistant District Attorney Jo Marlowe

- Amir Arison as Dr. Manning
- Harvey Atkin as Judge Alan Ridenour
- Caren Browning as Crime Scene Unit Captain Judith Siper
- Lindsay Crouse as Judge D. Andrews
- Sean Cullen as Brett Trask
- Ned Eisenberg as Defense Attorney Roger Kressler
- Joel de la Fuente as Technical Assistance Response Unit Lieutenant Ruben Morales
- Jabari Gray as Crime Scene Unit Technician Keegan Timmons
- Stephen Gregory as Dr. Kyle Beresford
- Peter Hermann as Defense Attorney Trevor Langan
- Chike Johnson as Victor Tate
- Christine Lahti as Executive Assistant District Attorney Sonya Paxton
- Georgia Lyman as Officer Whitney Bowman
- Joanna Merlin as Judge Lena Petrovsky
- Audrie J. Neenan as Judge Lois Preston
- J. Paul Nicholas as Defense Attorney Linden Delroy
- Tonye Patano as Judge L. Maskin
- Saila Rao as Media Technician Anu Nayyar
- Jeri Ryan as Defense Attorney Patrice Larue
- John Schuck as Chief of Detectives Muldrew
- Sharon Stone as Assistant District Attorney Jo Marlowe
- Delaney Williams as Defense Attorney John Buchanan

=== Guest stars ===
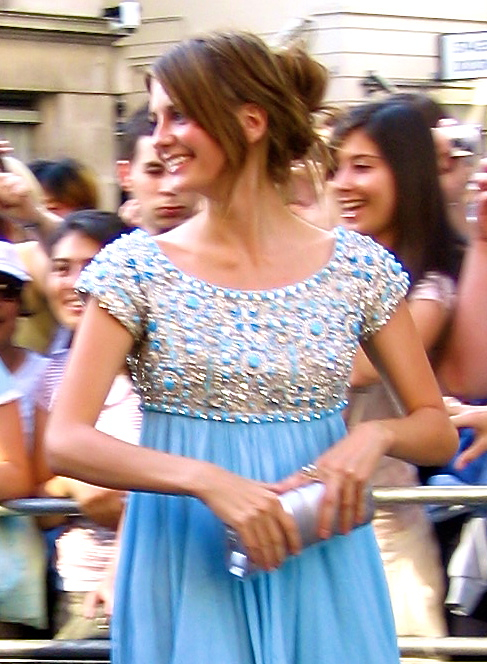
Various sources reported that Mischa Barton's performance suffered due to her "infamous hard partying". SVU film editor Nancy Forner responded by complimenting Barton's performance and saying "I think the press loves to be mean."

Wentworth Miller guest starred in the first episode as a police officer named Nate Kendall, who saves a rape victim in the beginning of the episode and helps SVU solve the case. In the second episode Eric McCormack played the CEO of a "sugar daddy" dating website named Vance Shepard. Scott Foley played a real-estate developer with severe alcoholism in the fourth episode "Hammered". He said that the interesting role attracted him to the show with: "the character was fully developed with addictions and problems both personally and professionally. Plus... it's SVU, come on!" His character is suspected of murdering an abortion doctor. After saying that he has no strong opinion on the issue in an interrogation room scene, Detective Tutuola tries to provoke a response by shouting "are you pro-choice or no choice?"

Justine Ezarik played a teenage girl in "Users" who dies just as a friend leaves to meet her. Ezarik blogged that "I know, it’s sad that I’m dead but I had a great time dying!" She also posted two videos about certain details in the production of her episode. They reveal, for example, that she did not have to type on the iPhone when her character sends a text message. The typing animation was pre-rendered and designed in Keynote. In the tenth episode, John Larroquette played Randall Carver, an attorney defending a man accused of murdering children of illegal aliens. In the episode, the character was asked by Ice-T's character, Detective Tutuola, why he was defending such a man, to which he replied "It's a symptom, not the disease.", and went on to say "Garrison, Limbaugh, Beck, O'Reilly, all of them. They're like a cancer spreading ignorance and hate. I mean, they have convinced folks that immigrants are the problem, not corporations that fail to pay a living wage or a broken health care system." Bill O'Reilly took offense and stated on his show that he was outraged by Dick Wolf's using his name in such a "defamatory manner" and called it "outrageous". He went on to say that "Dick Wolf is a coward for putting it out there."

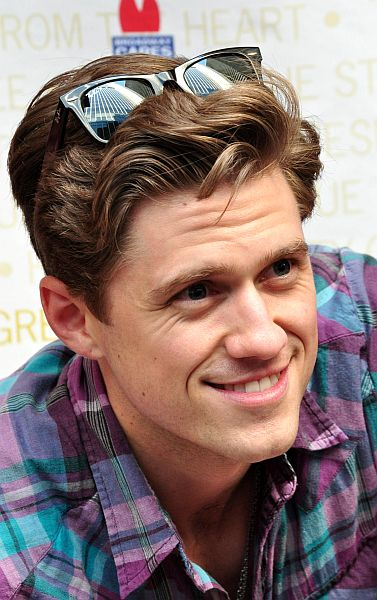
Aaron Tveit first appeared on SVU in the episode "Beef" as a vegetarian pacifist. He would appear again two seasons later.

Sarah Paulson played Ann Gillette, a woman with powerful ties to crime, in the episode "Shadow". Naveen Andrews played the undercover cop investigating her. Paulson stated in an interview that "it's not easy to sort of draw on reality per se, when you're trying to get into the mind of a potential sociopath." Comedian Kathy Griffin guest starred in the episode "P.C.", playing a lesbian activist named Babs Duffy. She was originally going to share an onscreen kiss with Benson. She said "Yes, we have a lesbian kiss". Despite the kiss between the characters being shown in a "behind the scenes" video, it was not shown in the final edit. Instead, Duffy leans in for a kiss but Benson pulls away. Filming of this episode, including the kiss, is documented in the June 15, 2010 episode of Kathy Griffin: My Life on the D-list. Tony Award winner Sutton Foster also appeared in the episode "P.C." as Rosemary, a lesbian activist who becomes a rape victim.

Lee Tergesen and Mischa Barton guest-starred in the episode "Savior". Barton played a hooker named Gladys, while Tergesen played a "deranged religious zealot suspected of murder". This reunited Tergesen with his former Oz co-star Christopher Meloni, who played his lover on the show, for the first time since the show ended in 2003. Lena Olin, Richard Burgi and Russell Jones appeared in "Confidential". Olin played Ingrid Block, the high-powered attorney of Richard Morgan (Burgi), a billionaire investment banker and Jones played Morgan's head of security. Despite Sam Waterston's being listed in a press release for the episode to appear as his Law & Order character Jack McCoy, he was only mentioned. Though on April 28 he made an appearance when Sharon Stone's character Jo Marlowe "makes a major faux pas". This marked the first time Waterston appeared in the SVU squad room.

Diora Baird portrayed a rape victim whose assault was witnessed by an illegal immigrant, who was reluctant to testify who herself was a victim of unspeakable war crimes in the Democratic Republic of the Congo she was portrayed by Saidah Arrika Ekulona, in the episode "Witness". Jill Scott, Lisa Arrindell Anderson and Quinton Aaron guest-starred in "Disabled", which aired March 24. Scott played the sister and caretaker of a former singer (Lisa Arrindell Anderson) who has severe multiple sclerosis and is raped. Aaron played Scott's son. Ann-Margret and Jaclyn Smith guest-starred in the episode "Bedtime" that aired March 31. Ann-Margret played "a star of commercials that were made in the '70s" and Smith a "retired cop who works with Benson and Stabler to solve an old crime". They were joined by Morgan Fairchild, Susan Anton, William Atherton and Renée Taylor, with Helen Shaver directing again. On August 21, 2010, Ann-Margret won the Emmy Award for Outstanding Guest Actress in a Drama Series for her performance in the episode. It was the first win of her career, after being nominated 5 times prior. Lynn Cohen guest-starred in the April 21 episode titled "Beef" playing a "matriarch of an Italian Beef Company". French actress Isabelle Huppert guest starred in the season finale as the mother of a kidnapped child. Tamara Tunie's character Melinda Warner nearly died of a gunshot wound in the episode. In an interview, Tunie revealed "I was excited about working with Isabelle because I love her work and have been a big fan of her films. But my immediate question was 'Do I live?'"

== Episodes ==
Law & Order: Special Victims Unit season 11 episodes
No. overall	No. in season	Title	Directed by	Written by	Original release date	Prod. code	U.S. viewers (millions)
225	1	"Unstable"	Arthur W. Forney	Judith McCreary	September 23, 2009	1101	8.36
Officer Nate Kendall (Wentworth Miller) aids a woman in trouble (Jennifer Ferrin) and becomes roped into solving a rape case. Detectives Elliot Stabler and Olivia Benson believe that Kendall is not right for the case due to his unstable personality. Executive ADA Sonya Paxton (Christine Lahti) joins the team, bringing evidence of a common thread among three other rape cases. Detective Stabler, who arrested the prime suspect (Chike Johnson) for the rapes ten years ago, realizes that the victim (Geneva Carr)'s interracial identification was incorrect and that he put an innocent man in prison for twenty-five years. The detectives track down the real rapist (Mahershala Ali) but are unable to get the results that they want after arresting him.
226	2	"Sugar"	Peter Leto	Daniel Truly	September 30, 2009	1102	8.09
A young woman (Julie Craig)'s body is found stuffed inside a suitcase, and police believe that she was a train passenger on her way to Tampa when she was murdered. Detectives Benson and Stabler turn to her financier boyfriend (Matt Burns)'s yacht to investigate. After further searching, the detectives discover that the victim belonged to an online dating website, but when its CEO (Eric McCormack) refuses to comment on the case, they turn to EADA Paxton for help. The CEO is the victim's new boyfriend, and he says that he accidentally killed his girlfriend because she wanted to break up with him. Later, it is revealed that someone close to the CEO (Melissa Farman) is responsible for the victim's death.
227	3	"Solitary"	Helen Shaver	Amanda Green	October 7, 2009	1103	8.29
When a woman (Deborah Ann Woll) is reported missing, her boyfriend (Bobby Campo) points Detectives Benson and Stabler in the direction of her downstairs neighbor (Stephen Rea), a convicted bank robber who spent nineteen years in solitary confinement. A surprising twist to the case exposes more of the ex-con's dark past.
228	4	"Hammered"	Peter Leto	Dawn DeNoon	October 14, 2009	1104	8.77
After a night of heavy drinking, an alcoholic (Scott Foley) wakes up to a bloody apartment, a terrible cut on his head and a dead woman in his bed. Unable to recall the night before, he immediately calls the police. Benson and Stabler suspect the crime is the result of a deadly love triangle while Munch and Tutuola discover that the victim was an abortion doctor. After talking to her ex-husband (Chris McKinney), the detectives learn about the numerous death threats that were sent to her. The squad arrests the man who originally called them when they find him beating up his business partner (Chris Bauer) for convincing him to drink again. This leads to a trial which exposes Sonya Paxton's drinking problem.
229	5	"Hardwired"	David Platt	Mick Betancourt	October 21, 2009	1105	9.15
After a woman with a short fuse (Rosie Perez) makes a shocking discovery about her son (Cruz Santiago) and his behavior at school, she takes him to the doctor and finds out that he has been the victim of sexual abuse. Detectives Benson and Stabler come onto the scene and question the victim and his family. From the boy's frightened reaction when his stepfather (Jim True-Frost) silences the investigation, it is clear to everyone in the room who the real perpetrator is. As Benson and Stabler are about to arrest the suspect, he agrees to give up the leader (Garret Dillahunt) of the largest pro child-adult relationship civil rights group in exchange for a plea bargain from ADA Alex Cabot, who returns from Albany.
230	6	"Spooked"	Peter Leto	Jonathan Greene	October 28, 2009	1106	8.24
In the back of a truck, police discover a murdered man and a murdered woman with breast implants cut out of her. Detectives Benson and Stabler investigate the scene and link the male victim to a dangerous Mexican drug cartel. Benson and Stabler follow a lead to an abandoned drug den where they are surprised to see FBI Special Agent Dean Porter (Vincent Spano), who is separately working on the case. When a suspect, Manuel Rojas (Jose Yenque) holds Olivia at gunpoint, Porter arrives and kills the suspect with timing that appears too convenient. Suspicious of his involvement, Olivia makes advances on him and eventually helps the SVU locate the killer (Paola Mendoza). Captain Cragen has no choice but to let her and Porter go free when it is revealed that the killing of the female victim helped preserve national security.
231	7	"Users"	David Platt	Michael Angeli	November 4, 2009	1108	7.95
After a crime scene photo of a murdered teenage girl (Justine Ezarik) rapidly becomes an Internet phenomenon, the police initiate an investigation with the victim's father (James Colby). When he points the detectives towards his daughter's suspicious therapist (James Frain), it turns out that the man's alibi is airtight. While Munch and Fin are busy tracking down the girl's stolen credit card, Warner and Stabler discover that one of the other therapy patients (Ryan Kelley) has broken into the morgue. The case takes an unexpected turn when the SVU realizes that their best potential witness is desperate for heroin. Huang puts his medical license on the line to get him an illegal drug with a high effectiveness for treating addiction.
232	8	"Turmoil"	Peter Leto	Judith McCreary	November 11, 2009	1109	8.77
After risqué photos of a fifteen-year-old rape victim (Shana Dowdeswell) are leaked onto the internet, Detectives Benson and Stabler's case becomes much more complicated. As the detectives' case slowly morphs into an investigation of ADA Cabot by the State Bar, Stabler's son Dickie (Jeffrey Scaperrotta) becomes entangled in a streak of compromising events at the hands of his best friend, a recovering drug addict (Joshua Page). As Benson takes charge of the rape case, Stabler is forced to set his personal opinions aside and deal with the potentially life-threatening situation his son and his friend have gotten themselves into.
233	9	"Perverted"	David Platt	Dawn DeNoon	November 18, 2009	1110	8.44
While in the park, a family stumbles upon the sexually mutilated body of a biker (Eddie "The Preacher" Abele) whose gang is known for prostitution and contract killing. To everyone's surprise, incriminating DNA evidence points to Detective Benson as the prime suspect. Munch and Fin investigate the murder while Stabler fights to prove his partner's innocence. Benson is confronted by a criminal she arrested years earlier (Patrick Heusinger). Having endured years of sexual abuse in prison, he framed Benson with the help of a questionable doctor (J. Robert Spencer).: Based on the journal Forensic Science International: Genetics by Israeli-based lead author Dan Frumkin.
234	10	"Anchor"	Jonathan Kaplan	Amanda Green & Daniel Truly	December 9, 2009	1107	7.92
When two young girls are similarly murdered a little over a month apart, Detective Tutuola decides to investigate the gruesome crimes. Benson puts him in touch with a reporter (Megalyn Echikunwoke) who may have enough connections to get them a lead. After a third killing, Fin discovers that all three children were "anchor babies" of immigrant families and reaches out to the Center of Immigrant Services. After sifting through the Center's hate mail, and witnessing a fight between an immigration lawyer (John Larroquette) and a fanatic (Thomas Sadoski) who follows a conservative talk show host (Bruce McGill), Fin begins to narrow in on the killer.
235	11	"Quickie"	David Platt	Ken Storer	January 6, 2010	1111	11.59
When a seventeen-year-old is found strangled and beaten to death in an alley, her ex-boyfriend (Brady Corbet) leads the cops to a website that she used to meet up with random men. Detective Benson decides to create a user account for the site and finds a womanizer (Brian Geraghty) who met with the victim and had sex with her without a condom. The case is closed when a different suspect is proven guilty of the murder but a new one opens when the original suspect is found to have HIV. To help ADA Cabot prosecute the predator for knowingly spreading HIV, one of his previous partners (Mattie Hawkinson) is brought into court. When this fails to work, the defendant's grandfather (Jack Larson) blames himself for his grandson's misogyny and causes him to have an epiphany.
236	12	"Shadow"	Amy Redford	Amanda Green	January 13, 2010	1112	7.65
When a wealthy couple is found murdered in their bedroom, Benson and Stabler decide to speak to the deceased couple's daughter Anne (Sarah Paulson). After hearing her story of a strange man who has been following her, the detectives soon discover that the supposed stalker is Detective Ashok Ramsey (Naveen Andrews) of the Special Frauds Division. Convinced that Anne killed her parents for their money, Ramsey becomes suspicious of Anne's business manager (Dennis Boutsikaris) and is led to believe that he helped her steal money from the foundation she runs. With little evidence to go on, the detectives are able to buy some time by blackmailing the foundation's leader (Edward Hibbert) into pressing charges against Anne for embezzlement. Even though hitmen have been sent after them, Benson and Ramsey go out into the open as part of a dangerous sting operation.
237	13	"P.C."	Juan J. Campanella	Daniel Truly	March 3, 2010	1115	8.14
A patrol cop finds a beautiful woman (Ashby Dodge) nearly dead; she dies before Benson and Stabler reach the hospital. Soon a lesbian rights group with a charismatic leader (Kathy Griffin) gets involved, claiming the victim's death was a result of police neglect over the LGBT community. The detectives initially suspect the woman's former lover (Kate Udall) to be responsible but when she is in custody more women from the group are attacked. From security camera footage and their own surveillance of a press conference, the SVU is able to arrest a homophobic man (Chad Donella) and prove he is the killer.
238	14	"Savior"	Peter Leto	Mick Betancourt	March 3, 2010	1114	8.14
A series of young prostitutes is found murdered with homemade prayer cards attached to their bodies leading Detectives Benson and Stabler to a religious zealot (Lee Tergesen). However, they find a prostitute (Mischa Barton) who survived his attacks and count on her testimony to put the killer away. Olivia is left to make a heartbreaking decision after the survivor asks for her help.
239	15	"Confidential"	Peter Leto	Jonathan Greene	March 10, 2010	1113	8.53
Cragen and the SVU squad find a woman dead in a garbage can soon after she is recorded being abducted by security cameras. Munch recalls a similar case from twenty years before, which sends Benson and Stabler to Sing Sing to speak to the supposed culprit (Yul Vazquez). The detectives discover that the building owner (Richard Burgi) actually committed both crimes after their investigation comes under fierce opposition from his lawyer (Lena Olin). The trial that follows focuses on the collateral damage caused by attorney–client privilege.
240	16	"Witness"	David Platt	Dawn DeNoon & Christine M. Torres	March 17, 2010	1116	9.65
A pretty woman (Diora Baird) is raped and cut in her apartment building's stairwell and claims a black woman saved her by punching the perpetrator (Eric Lange) in the eye. The lady is identified as Nardalee Ula (Saidah Arrika Ekulona), an illegal immigrant from Democratic Republic of the Congo, who came to America after escaping a life of sexual abuse against women used by the country as a "weapon of war". After the victim dies from MRSA, Nardalee is the only one who can testify against the rapist, but risks being deported. After her successful testimony she is awarded a U-Visa, but declines it, saying she will be going back to the Congo to help save other women from sexual abuse. Meanwhile, ADA Cabot makes a shocking decision of her own.
241	17	"Disabled"	Paul Black	Judith McCreary	March 24, 2010	1117	10.58
When she fails to show up at a bus stop, Cara Raleigh (Lisa Arrindell Anderson), a disabled former opera singer with multiple sclerosis who cannot speak, is found by her bus driver (Ralph Byers), beaten and raped in her home. Her nephew (Quinton Aaron) gives an alibi that does not check out and her sister (Jill Scott) is seen physically abusing her on video. As a result, both caregivers become suspects. Cara eventually reveals that the bus driver was the rapist but is put in a nursing home and becomes unwilling to cooperate. Benson manages to persuade her to stand trial with the unit's temporary ADA (Teddy Sears).: Episode inspired by elements from the film What Ever Happened to Baby Jane?
242	18	"Bedtime"	Helen Shaver	Story by : Charley Davis; Teleplay by : Neal Baer & Daniel Truly	March 31, 2010	1118	10.08
When a successful undercover journalist is discovered bound and carved in her apartment, it renews an investigation into a series of similar killings that occurred in the mid 1970s, and it unveils a twisted love affair was the motive.: This episode was based on a real case that was committed by serial killer Timothy Wilson Spencer.; Susan Anton, Morgan Fairchild, Ann-Margret, Jaclyn Smith and Robert Newman make guest appearances in this episode.
243	19	"Conned"	David Platt	Ken Storer	April 7, 2010	1119	8.36
A homosexual prostitute (Pressly Coker) is found dead in the storage room of a hotel during a wedding reception with the ID of a friend named Andrew Hingam (John Magaro). Fin Tutuola questions his son Ken (Ernest Waddell) about the two boys since they were all known to volunteer at the same place. Ken leads Fin to Hingam, who confesses to killing his friend in self-defense. Hingam's case deepens when detectives learn that his psychiatrist (Ally Walker) who prescribes a regimen of drugs and electro convulsive therapy may be performing other procedures on him as well.
244	20	"Beef"	Peter Leto	Lisa Loomer	April 21, 2010	1120	8.75
Following the vicious rape-murder of a beautiful worker (Ioana Alfonso) at "Donna Rosa's" meat packing plant, the police initially suspect that a vegetarian (Aaron Tveit) who lives in her building is the killer. However, suspicion shifts elsewhere when they learn that the victim was an undercover animal activist attempting to document and expose unsanitary practices in the meat packing industry. Information from the company owner (Lynn Cohen) and foreman (John Petkoff) leads the detectives to arrest a plant worker (Juan Javier Cardenas) and match his DNA to that found at the crime scene. This turns out to be a dead end as well after an interview with his jealous wife (Nancy Rodriguez) reveals that he was framed. Detective Benson goes undercover herself to retrace the woman's steps.
245	21	"Torch"	Peter Leto	Mick Betancourt & Amanda Green	April 28, 2010	1121	9.49
Jo Marlowe, Stabler's old partner before SVU, becomes the new ADA for the SVU team and enlists the help of Benson and Stabler in the case of two young girls, presumably left to die in a burning house by their father (Kevin Anderson). Upon further investigation by the SVU squad, however, it is discovered that the fire arose from a defective space heater, and the father was innocent, later exposing the incorrect assumptions of a fire marshal (P. J. Benjamin) with the help of an independent pyrotechnic investigator (Brad Dourif).: Special appearance by Sam Waterston as DA Jack McCoy.; Based on the Cameron Todd Willingham case.
246	22	"Ace"	David Platt	Jonathan Greene	May 5, 2010	1122	8.43
Detectives Benson and Stabler must track down a pregnant rape victim (Hanna-Liina Võsa) who disappears from the hospital. In the process, they uncover a vast baby-trafficking scam, led by a Bulgarian crime lord (Pasha D. Lychnikoff). When the woman (Gordana Rashovich) who housed the pregnant mothers is discovered murdered, Benson and Stabler go undercover as infertile parents, while ADA Marlowe clashes with Cragen over methods to protect the kidnapped woman and her newborn child. Matters become complicated in the trial when the gynecologist (David Paymer) involved is assigned the same lawyer as the mob that used him for his access to pregnant women. He realizes that if he testifies truthfully he will be killed so a shadow counsel is arranged.
247	23	"Wannabe"	David Platt	Dawn DeNoon	May 12, 2010	1123	8.57
The investigation into the rape of three young girls (Antonella Lentini, Danika Yarosh and Madison Cerniglia) reveals some secrets about a supposed rookie cop (Graham Davie). The rookie arrests the rapist (Raphael Sbarge) despite being a high school student. Upon repeated insistence from Marlowe to stay away from the case, he places himself in harm's way by snooping into the investigation, getting arrested twice in the process. One of his personal investigations nearly gets him killed, but it turns the case in Marlowe's favor by implicating the rapist's father (Raymond J. Barry) in the crimes as well.
248	24	"Shattered"	Peter Leto	Amanda Green & Daniel Truly	May 19, 2010	1124	8.79
The detectives search for a young boy (Jake Miller) who has been kidnapped by his mother (Isabelle Huppert) in response to the boy's father (D. W. Moffett) having full custody. The mother is an anthropologist who wants her son to travel the world with her through her anthropological exploits. This orchestrated kidnapping goes wrong, however, and both the boy and the kidnapper (David Shumbris) die in an automobile accident when the kidnapper tries to evade police. This makes the mother hysterical, and she ends up taking her husband, Detective Benson and ADA Marlowe hostage and shooting ME Warner.
