= Élodie Bouchez =

French actress (born 1973)

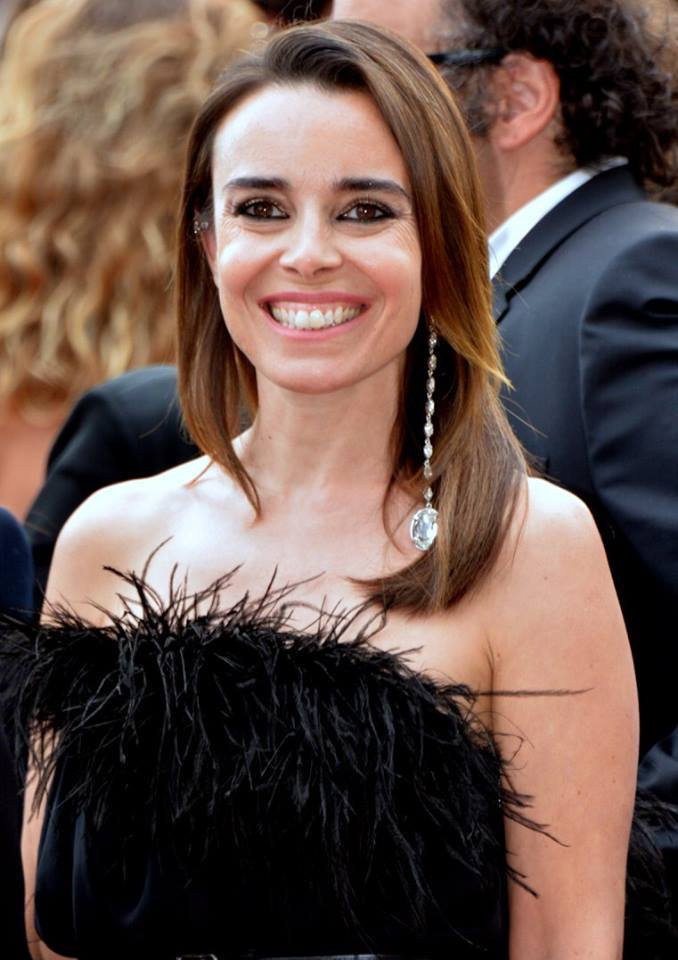
- Bouchez at the 2018 Cannes Film Festival
- Born: 5 April 1973 (age 53); Montreuil, France
- Other name: Paployon
- Occupation: Actress
- Years active: 1990–present
- Spouse: Thomas Bangalter (m. 1996)
- Children: 2

Élodie Bouchez (French pronunciation: [elɔdi buʃe]; born 5 April 1973) is a French actress. She became internationally known for her role as Renée Rienne on the fifth and final season of the television show Alias and for playing Maïté Alvarez in the film Wild Reeds.

== Early life and career ==
Bouchez was born in the Parisian suburb of Montreuil. She is best known for her César Award's Most Promising Actress winning film Wild Reeds (1994) by André Téchiné, and the Best Actress Award for the film La Vie rêvée des anges at the 1998 Cannes Film Festival. She also won the Best Actress Award for Poetical Refugee (original French title: La faute à Voltaire) at the 2001 Cologne Mediterranean Film Festival.

In the fall of 2005, she joined the cast of the American TV series Alias for its fifth and final season. She played Renée Rienne, an assassin who works unofficially for a black ops division of the CIA. Although considered a main cast member, she only appeared in select episodes, her character acting as something of a "secret weapon". Bouchez has also guest starred on Showtime's lesbian drama series The L Word, where she portrays Claude, a French writer who meets Jenny on a trip to Canada.

== Personal life ==
Bouchez is married to Thomas Bangalter of the former electronic music duo Daft Punk. The couple have two sons.

== Filmography ==
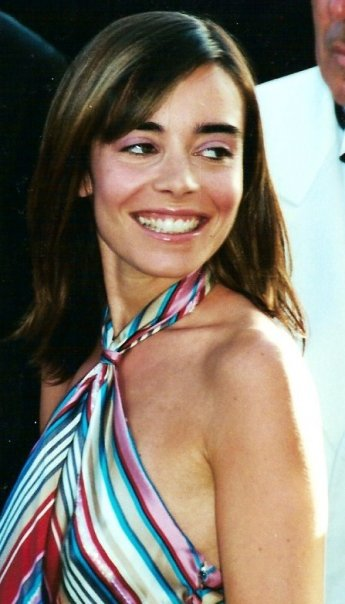
Bouchez at the 2000 Cannes Film Festival.

Year	Title	Role	Director	Notes
1990	Stan the Flasher	Natacha	Serge Gainsbourg	
1993	Tango	Girl in Aeroplane	Patrice Leconte	
1993	Le cahier volé	Virginie	Christine Lipinska	
1994	Wild Reeds	Maïté Alvarez	André Téchiné	
1995	Le Péril jeune	Sophie	Cédric Klapisch	
1995	Those were the days	Delphine	Didier Haudepin	
1996	Full Speed	Julie	Gaël Morel	
1996	The Proprietor	Young Girl	Ismail Merchant	
1997	Clubbed to Death	Lola	Yolande Zauberman	
1997	La divine poursuite	Angèle	Michel Deville	
1997	Flames in Paradise	Georgette / Juliette	Markus Imhoof	
1997	Le ciel est à nous	Lola / Marguerite	Graham Guit	
1998	The Dreamlife of Angels	Isabelle 'Isa' Tostin	Erick Zonca	
1998	Zonzon	Carmen	Laurent Bouhnik	
1998	Les kidnappeurs	Claire	Graham Guit	
1999	Lovers	Jeanne	Jean-Marc Barr	
1999	Louise (Take 2)	Louise	Siegfried	
1999	Don't Let Me Die on a Sunday	Térésa	Didier Le Pêcheur	
2001	Poetical Refugee	Lucie	Abdellatif Kechiche	
2001	Too Much Flesh	Juliette	Jean-Marc Barr & Pascal Arnold	
2001	Being Light	Justine	Jean-Marc Barr & Pascal Arnold	
2001	Le petit poucet	The ogre's wife	Olivier Dahan	
2001	The Beatnicks	Nica	Nicholson Williams	
2002	CQ	Marlène	Roman Coppola	
2002	La guerre à Paris	Ana Maria	Yolande Zauberman	
2003	Stormy Weather	Cora	Sólveig Anspach	
2003	Le pacte du silence	Gaëlle / Sarah	Graham Guit	
2005	Brice de Nice	Jeanne	James Huth	
2005	America Brown	Rosie	Paul Black	
2005	Shooting Vegetarians	The Happy Coffee Shop Girl	Mikey Jackson	
2005–2006	Alias	Renée Rienne	Ken Olin, Frederick E.O. Toye, ...	TV series (12 Episodes)
2006	Sorry, Haters	Eloise	Jeff Stanzler	
2006–2007	The L Word	Claude Mondrian	Ilene Chaiken & Bronwen Hughes	TV series (2 Episodes)
2007	After Him (Après lui)	Laure	Gaël Morel	
2007	Héros	Lisa	Bruno Merle	
2007	Ma place au soleil	Julie	Eric de Montalier	
2007	Tel père telle fille	Sandra	Olivier De Plas	
2007	Je déteste les enfants des autres	Cécile	Anne Fassio	
2008	2 Alone in Paris	Juliette	Ramzy Bedia & Éric Judor	
2010	Happy Few	Teri	Antony Cordier	
2010	In Memory of the Days to Come	Maya	Jean-Christian Bourcart	
2010	The Imperialists Are Still Alive!	Asya	Zeina Durra	
2013	La grande boucle	Sylvie Nouel	Laurent Tuel	
2013	Juliette	Louise	Pierre Godeau	
2014	Reality	Alice Tantra	Quentin Dupieux	
2014	GHB: To Be or Not to Be	Jo	Laetitia Masson	
2016	Hibou	Panda / Anita	Ramzy Bedia	
2017	Gaspard va au mariage	Gaspard's mother	Antony Cordier	
2018	In Safe Hands	Alice	Jeanne Herry	
2018	Guy	Young Anne-Marie	Alex Lutz	
2018	Fleuve noir	Lola Bellaile	Erick Zonca	
2019	Temps de chien	Florence	Edouard Deluc	
2022	Simone Veil, A Woman of the Century	Yvonne Jacob	Olivier Dahan	
2022	Hawaii	Ines	Mélissa Drigeard	
2023	All Your Faces	Judith	Jeanne Herry	
2023	Consent	Vanessa Springora	Vanessa Filho	
2023	For Night Will Come	Laurence Féral	Céline Rouzet	
2024	Beating Hearts	Clotaire's mother	Gilles Lellouche	
2025	Enzo	Marion	Robin Campillo	

== Awards and nominations ==
=== Cannes Film Festival ===
Year	Category	Nominated work	Result	Ref.
1998	Best actress	The Dreamlife of Angels	Won	

=== César Awards ===
Year	Category	Nominated work	Result	Ref.
1995	Most Promising Actress	Wild Reeds	Won	
1999	Best Actress	The Dreamlife of Angels	Won	
2019	Best Actress	In Safe Hands	Nominated	
2024	Best Supporting Actress	All Your Faces	Nominated	
2025	Best Supporting Actress	Beating Hearts	Nominated	

=== European Film Awards ===
Year	Category	Nominated work	Result	Ref.
1998	Best actress	The Dreamlife of Angels	Won	

=== Lumière Awards ===
Year	Category	Nominated work	Result	Ref.
1999	Best Actress	The Dreamlife of Angels	Won	
2019	Best Actress	In Safe Hands	Won	

=== Miscellaneous Awards ===
Year	Organization	Nominated work	Award	Result	Ref.
2000	Angers European First Film Festival	Poetical Refugee	Jean Carmet Award for the ensemble cast	Won	
2000	Chlotrudis Awards	The Dreamlife of Angels	Best Actress	Nominated	
2001	Cologne Mediterranean Film Festival	Poetical Refugee	Best Actress	Won	
2003	Edda Awards	Stormy Weather	Best Actress	Nominated	
2019	Festival International du Film Francophone de Namur	In Safe Hands	Best Actress	Won	
2019	Grand Prix Cinema ELLE	In Safe Hands	Best Actress	Won	
2024	Brussels International Film Festival	For Night Will Come	Best Actress	Won	
