= Full Speed (1996 film) =

- Directed by: Gaël Morel
- Written by: Gaël Morel; Catherine Corsini
- Produced by: Laurent Bénégui; Valérie Fumet; Philippe Missonnier; Fabienne Morin; Thomas Ordonneau
- Starring: Élodie Bouchez; Stéphane Rideau
- Cinematography: Jeanne Lapoirie
- Edited by: Catherine Schwartz
- Production companies: Magouric Productions; Téléma
- Distributed by: PolyGram Film Distribution
- Release date: 25 September 1996
- Running time: 85 minutes
- Country: France
- Language: French

Full Speed (French: À Toute Vitesse) is a 1996 French drama film by Gaël Morel, in his directorial debut. The movies stars Élodie Bouchez, Stéphane Rideau, Pascal Cervo, Meziane Bardadi and Salim Kechiouche. It was released on 25 September 1996.

== Plot ==
Quentin has penned a novel, exploring the struggles of young people, and it has earned him some recognition in the French literary scene. In order to gather material for his new book he wants to write, Quentin has been spending time with Samir, who is still haunted by the violent death of his lover two years ago. While Quentin is looking for stories he can include in his book, Samir is looking for a love connection, and is distraught when Quentin rudely tells him he is not interested in a sexual relationship with him. Quentin is sleeping with Julie who lives by herself in her parents' house. However, Julie has been seeking attention from Jimmy, who is Quentin's best friend. When Quentin decides to follow his writing career by moving to Paris, Julie and Jimmy decide to pursue a relationship.

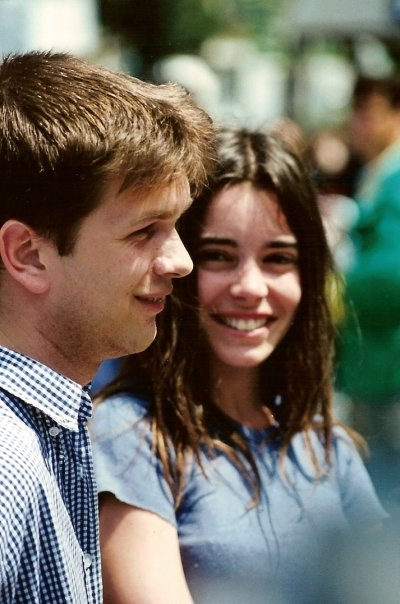
Director Gaël Morel with Elodie Bouchez (Julie)

== Cast ==
- Élodie Bouchez - Julie
- Stéphane Rideau - Jimmy
- Pascal Cervo - Quentin
- Meziane Bardadi - Samir
- Salim Kechiouche - Jamel
- Romain Auger - Rick
- Mohammed Dib - Karim

== Reception ==
Sight and Sound pointed out there was a "striking similarity" between this movie and André Téchiné's Les Roseaux sauvages, which the director, Morel had appeared in. Overall, they concluded that "for all the generally spirited and convincing performances and Morel's evident social and cinematic awareness, the film often gives the impression of being less than the sum of its parts." Renee Graham wrote in the Boston Globe that "Morel's debut film is a none-too-subtle morality play; with a bevy of beautiful young men who look as if they escaped from a Gordon Merrick novel." However, she observed that the "film percolates with rhythmic street beats that prove just how influential American rap music and culture have become to French youth."

Film critic Stephen Holden said that while the film "has scenes set in discos, on motorcycles and on the street, it's anything but a realist film; keeping the camera focused on its four main characters' wonderfully expressive faces, it is an unblushing ode to youth and beauty with a tart political subtext." Author David Bleiler wrote "Gael borrows more than he should have from his mentor André Téchiné's classic film. The similarities are so obvious to be embarrassing, but if taken alone, Morel's film successfully captures the drama of young lust, bisexuality, unrequited love and racial prejudice."

In his review for the San Francisco Examiner, Allen Johnson opined that the film is a "brilliant, assured coming-of-age story that has everything." He further praised the film, writing it has a "blissfully active camera, and Morel knows just how to use it; he has made a 'complete' film, where every element down to the sound effects is just right." Amy Taubin wrote in The Village Voice that the "film has nothing much to recommend it except a few dozen young boys without shirts." She also wondered if the title Full Speed – "is meant to refer to the breakneck pace of adolescent passion, but also serving as a description of the way the actors have been directed to speak their lines as rapidly and flatly as possible." Film critic Kevin Thomas wrote that "Morel has a commanding way of revealing these young people to us and to one another through their constantly shifting allegiances and interactions."

== See also ==
- List of French films of 1996
- List of LGBTQ-related films
- Wild Reeds
