= Almost Nothing =

Almost Nothing may refer to:

- Almost Nothing, the UK release title of the 2000 French-Belgian romantic drama film Presque rien
- Almost Nothing, a 2023 music project by Roddy Woomble
