= Loin (film) =

2001 film by André Téchiné

- Theatrical release poster
- Directed by: André Téchiné
- Written by: André Téchiné; Faouzi Bensaïdi
- Starring: Stéphane Rideau; Lubna Azabal; Mohamed Hamaidi; Gaël Morel
- Cinematography: Germain Desmoulins
- Edited by: Hervé de Luze
- Music by: Juliette Garrigues
- Production companies: Saïd Ben Saïd; Alhena Films
- Release date: 29 August 2001
- Running time: 120 minutes
- Country: France
- Language: French
- Budget: $5.5 million
- Box office: $450.000

Loin (English: Far) is a 2001 French-Spanish drama film directed by André Téchiné, starring Stéphane Rideau, Lubna Azabal and Mohamed Hamaidi. The film, set in Tangier in a three-day period, tells the story of three young friends making critical decisions about their uncertain future.

== Plot ==
For the past few years, Serge, a young French man, has been working as a long-distance truck driver, employed by a company that ships goods from Morocco to Europe. His job gives him plenty of time for reflection and boredom. In Algeciras, ready to make his next trip to Africa, Serge succumbs to the criminal subculture, dangerously agreeing to smuggle hashish from Morocco to Europe by hiding the illegal drugs in his truck.

This time, the Moroccan stopover between transports of cargoes will last three days. In Tangier, while he waits for his truck to be loaded and pass customs, Serge is reunited with his friend Saïd. Saïd, a young Moroccan whose only possession is his bicycle, desperately seeks to escape his restrictive background and avidly longs for the possibility and intrigue of life beyond Africa. He has attempted illegal immigration many times before with dire consequences. Serge, who is eager to see his on and off girlfriend Sara, Saïd’s friend and employer, strikes a deal with Saïd. If Saïd can convince Sarah to see him again, Serge promises to smuggle Saïd to Europe.

Saïd takes Serge to see his and Sara’s friends: Jack, a gay American émigré living happily in Morocco, and François, a young film director preparing a documentary on illegal immigration. François and Serge went to the same school eight years earlier. Saïd entices Sara to go out that night in order to prepare and encounter Serge. When she first sees Serge again, she runs away, but ultimately she yields and they get back together. Sara, a beautiful, independent young Jewish woman mourning her recently deceased mother, operates a small hotel where Saïd works. She is in a dilemma of her own. Her successful brother, a Canadian émigré, wants her to leave Morocco and join him in Montreal. She agonizes over the decision, unsure about emigrating. Serge's return and their complicated relationship only make it harder to make a decision. Emily, Sara’s sister-in-law, a writer who recently has lost a son, arrives to help her close the hotel and resettle in Canada. The closing of the hotel leaves Saïd without a job and intensifies his need to try and get to Europe. However, Serge backs off with his part of the plan to take Saïd in his truck to Spain. Angry, Saïd breaks his friendship with Serge and tries to turn Sarah against Serge.

With the money that Sarah gives Saïd for the loss of his job, he goes to a seedy neighborhood with François, who is attracted to Saïd. While trying to change the local currency to pesetas, he is robbed and loses his bicycle in the process. In contrast to Sarah and Saïd, their friend Farida, an independent optician who has recently divorced her husband, is very attached to Morocco and would never consider emigrating. The group of friends has a picnic, during which Farida has to be rushed to the hospital to give birth. The party of friends invited by François goes to see Jean Renoir’s The River. In the end, Serge ends up empty-handed; he neither gets any money from his attempt at smuggling drugs nor does he have certainty in his relationship with Sara, who still can't make up her mind to either leave or stay in Tangier. Saïd, with little to lose, goes to the port and hides beneath Serge’s truck. He is found by Serge, who sneaks him inside the truck’s cabin. Together they continue on the road to Europe.

== Cast ==
- Stéphane Rideau as Serge
- Lubna Azabal as Sara
- Mohamed Hamaidi as Saïd
- Gaël Morel as François
- Jack Taylor as James
- Yasmina Reza as Emily
- Rachida Brakni as Nezha
- Nabila Baraka as Farida

== Analysis ==
Loin was shot on digital video using primarily natural light. The slightly patchy video image contributes to the sense of collapse and unease. The film is set in Tangier and is told in three "movements"; the sections marked by chapters. Téchiné renders the confusion and desperation occasioned by the three leads' personal dilemmas into a larger canvas of cultural dislocation, identity and friendship.

In moving between the stories of his three principal actors, Téchiné establishes both an emotional immediacy and painful confusion that capture the intensity of feeling between them, addressing some of the director's trademark themes: family relations, irreconcilable sexual entanglements and the allure of criminal activity. Téchiné, examines the relationships between these three very independent twenty somethings, showing how their various desires in life conflict because of citizenship, employment, class differences, as well as personal outlook

The film generally concerns Moroccans with various relationships with the country: visiting, staying, leaving and contemplating. Techiné captures the complexity of the emotions that join his star-crossed lovers. He balances their love story against the serious backdrop of smuggling and immigration.

== DVD release ==
Loin is available in Region 2 DVD. Audio in French and dubbed Spanish. Spanish subtitles. There is no Region 1 DVD available.
