= Natacha Régnier =

Belgian actress (born 1974)

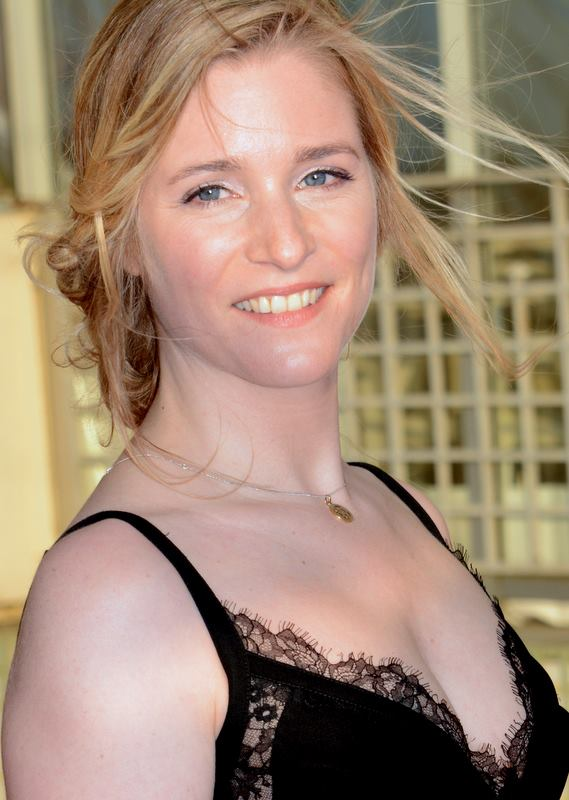
- Régnier at the Cabourg Film Festival in June 2014
- Born: Nathalie Régnier; 11 April 1974 (age 51); Ixelles, Belgium
- Education: INSAS
- Occupation: Actress
- Years active: 1993–present
- Spouse(s): Yann Tiersen (divorced) Guillaume Bounaud (m. 2008)
- Children: 2 daughters

Nathalie "Natacha" Régnier (born 11 April 1974) is a Belgian actress. She received a Cannes Film Festival Award, a European Film Award, and a César Award for her role in the 1998 film The Dreamlife of Angels. Régnier is the first Belgian actress to win a César Award.

== Life and career ==
Born in Ixelles, a municipality of Brussels, she was attracted to theatre from early adolescence. Her first screen role was in The Motorcycle Girl (1993), a short film by Stéphan Carpiaux. After that, she played a number of roles for French television.

In 1998 Régnier and Élodie Bouchez received the Prix d'interprétation féminine (Best Actress) at the 1998 Cannes Film Festival for their roles in La vie rêvée des anges by Erick Zonca.

She has stated that her idol is film actress Sandrine Bonnaire.

Régnier dated Jérémie Renier. Natacha Régnier was married to French musician Yann Tiersen, but they are now divorced. They have a daughter.

She received a Magritte Award nomination for Best Supporting Actress. Régnier has just finished the film Une journée, which is now in post-production.

== Selected filmography ==
- Encore (1996), directed by Pascal Bonitzer
- La vie rêvée des anges (The Dreamlife of Angels) (1998), directed by Erick Zonca – Marie Thomas
- Les amants criminels (1999), directed by François Ozon – Alice
- Il tempo dell'amore (1999), directed by Giacomo Campiotti – Claire
- Tout va bien, on s'en va (2000), directed by Claude Mouriéras – Claire
- How I Killed My Father (2001), directed by Anne Fontaine – Isa
- Vert paradis (2003), directed by Emmanuel Bourdieu – Isabelle
- Le Pont des Arts (2004) by Eugène Green
- Tomorrow We Move (2004), directed by Chantal Akerman – La femme enceinte
- The Right of the Weakest (2006)
- Poison Friends (2006)
- Boxes (2007), directed by Jane Birkin – Fanny
- La Proie (2011) – Christine Maurel
- One Night (2012) by Lucas Belvaux – Anne
- Capital (2013), directed by Costa Gavras – Diane Tourneuil
- Mood Indigo (2013)
- The Son of Joseph (2016) by Eugène Green – Marie
- Above the Law (2017)
- The Benefit of the Doubt (2017)
- Marseille (2018) – TV series
- The Promise (2020) – TV series

== Theatre ==
- 2009 : C'était Marie-Antoinette by Évelyne Lever, Opéra National de Montpellier, Festival de Radio France et Montpellier – Marie-Antoinette
