= Salim Kechiouche =

French actor (born 1979)

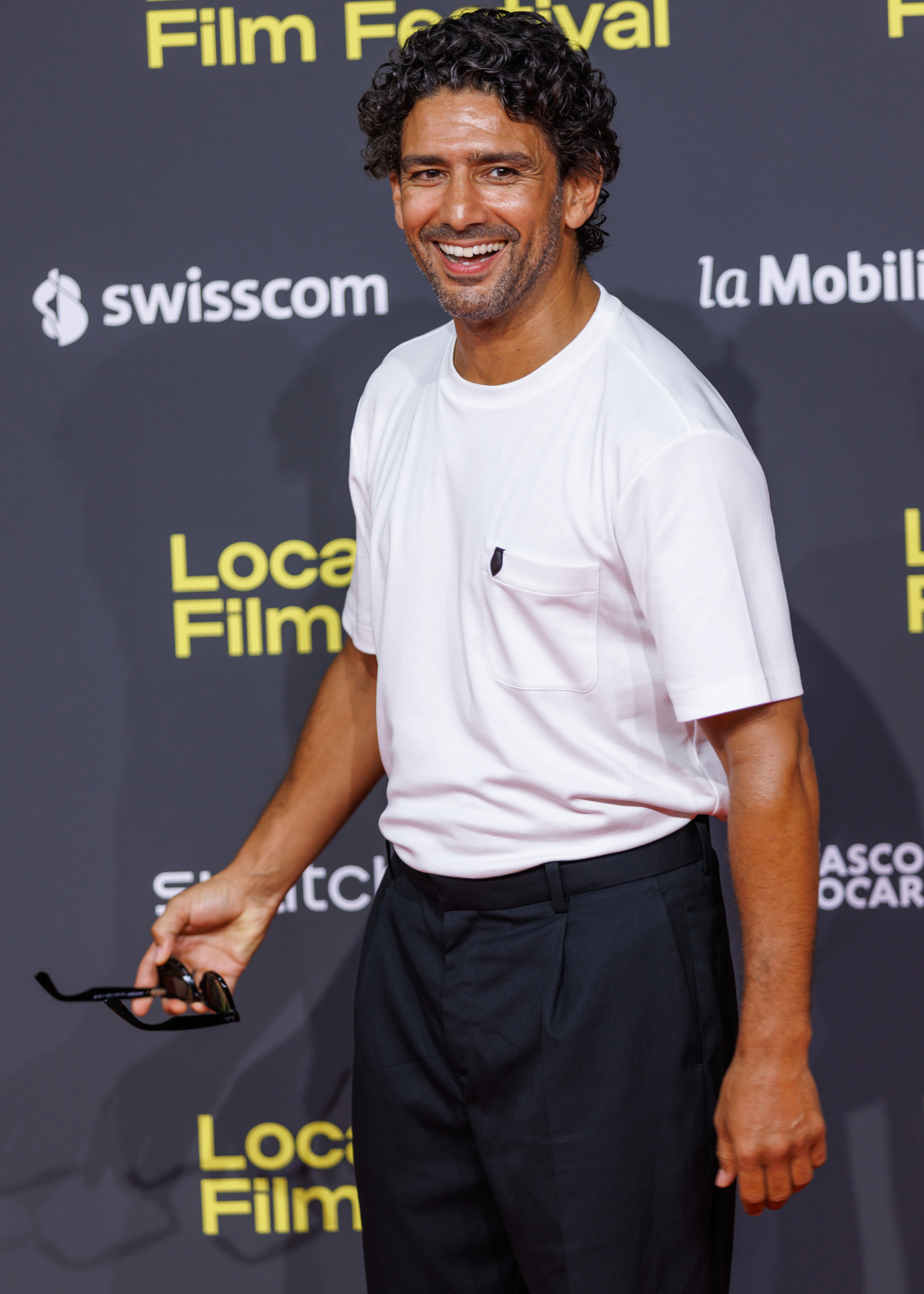
- Kechiouche in 2025
- Born: 2 April 1979 (age 46); Lyon, France
- Occupation: Actor
- Years active: 1996–present
- Website: www.salimkechiouche.com

Salim Kechiouche (born 2 April 1979) is a French actor.

== Early life ==
Kechiouche was born to Algerian parents in Lyon, France. At the age of 15, he was discovered by French actor and director Gaël Morel. Morel gave him his first role in a feature film, À Toute Vitesse (Full Speed), released in 1996. Kechiouche has acted in most of Morel's works, including Premières Neiges in 1999, 3 Dancing Slaves (Le Clan) in 2004 and After Him (Après lui) in 2007. He entered acting school and graduated in 2002.

Kechiouche now lives in Paris, dividing his time between cinema and the stage.

== Career ==
=== Film and stage ===
In addition to Morel, Kechiouche has worked with other French directors such as François Ozon, as well as with non-French directors.

In 2003, Kechiouche played the role of Karim in Gigolo, directed by German director Bastian Schweitzer, opposite Amanda Lear. Kechiouche played a self-destructive gigolo trying to get his life back on track in the jet-set world of Paris. The film was nominated for a Golden Bear Award in the Best Short Film category at the 2005 Berlin International Film Festival.

Kechiouche has acted in short and feature films, plays and TV series. His movies include Grande École (2004), playing Mécir, and Le Clan (2004), released as Three Dancing Slaves in the U.S.. On stage in Paris, he played the role of Giuseppe Pelosi, the killer and lover of Pier Paolo Pasolini in Vie et Mort de Pier Paolo Pasolini, written by Michel Azama.

Kechiouche was kick boxing champion of France in 1998 and first runner-up in Thai boxing in 1999 and in 2002. His boxing skills were used in some of his films where he played a boxer, such as Les Amants Criminels, Archives De Nuit, Le Clan, Nos Retrouvailles, and when playing himself in the experimental film Cinématon.

He has appeared in full-frontal nude scenes in at least two films: in Francois Ozon's 1999 film, Les Amants Criminels, released as Criminal Lovers in the U.S. and a few years later, in Grande École.

=== Modeling ===
Pierre et Gilles produced photographs and paintings related to Les Amants Criminels and for the play Vie et Mort de Pier Paolo Pasolini in 2003. Youssef Nabil and Michel Giliberti also created a dozen paintings in 2005 and 2006. Kechiouche appeared with French actress Julie-Marie Parmentier in the photo series Doppelgänger (2007) by French photographer Raphaël Neal.

== Filmography ==
=== Feature film ===
Year	Film	Role	Notes
1996	À Toute Vitesse	Jamel	Released as "Full Speed" in the USA
1999	Premières Neiges	Kacem	Directed by Gaël Morel
1999	Les Amants Criminels	Saïd	Released as "Criminal Lovers" in the USA
2004	Grande École	Mécir	
2004	Le Clan	Hicham	Released as Three Dancing Slaves in the USA
2007	L'Année Suivante	Nayib	By Isabelle Czajka
2007	Nos Retrouvailles	Karim	By David Oelhoffen
2007	After Him (Après lui)	Salim	Directed by Gaël Morel
2009	The String	Bilal	Directed by Mehdi Ben Attia
2013	Blue Is the Warmest Colour	Samir	Directed by Abdellatif Kechiche
2014	Être	Mohamed	Directed by Fara Sene
2015	Noir	Kadhafi	Directed by Yves Christian Fournier
2015	Voyoucratie	Sam	Directed by Fabrice Garçon and Kevin Ossona
2015	Foreign Body	Imed	Directed by Raja Amari
2017	Mektoub, My Love: Canto Uno	Tony	Directed by Abdellatif Kechiche
2019	Mektoub, My Love: Intermezzo	Tony	Directed by Abdellatif Kechiche
2025	Mektoub, My Love: Canto Due	Tony	Directed by Abdellatif Kechiche
	Qu'un sang impur		post-production

=== Short film ===
Year	Film	Role	Notes
2004	Couscous Pour Tout Le Monde	Luc	By Vincent Pesci
2004	Pas Sans Moi	Golden Boy	Experimental short by Sandra Dalle
2005	Gigolo (color version); Archives De Nuit (black-and-white version)	Karim	Nominated for a Golden Bear Award at the 2005 Berlin International Film Festival
2005	Temps Morts or A Summer Afternoon	Saïd	By Éléonore Weber
2005	Cinematon	Himself	Experimental film by Gérard Courant - #2,102 in the collection
2006	Yasmina	Sofiane	By Vincent Pesci
2006	Er-radja, Le Retour	Himself	Documentary with the actor going back to his roots in Algeria

=== TV series ===
Year	Title	Episode	Role
2003	Malone	La Promesse de l'Ours	
2004	Le Grand Patron	En Quarantaine	Sami
2006	Préjudices	Balle Perdue	
2006	Docudrama French and English	La Grande Inondation	Malik

== Theatre ==
Year	Title	Director	Notes
2001	A l'Ombre d'Ambre	Edmonde Franchi	Radio play for Radio France Lyon
2002	Le Piqueur de Macadam	Edmonde Franchi	Radio play for Radio France Lyon
2002	Lumières - Une Tuerie	Julien Collet	Radio play for France Culture
2002	Les Derniers Jours de l'Humanité	Salvadora Parras	By Karl Kraus
2003	Vie et Mort de Pier Paolo Pasolini	Jean Menaud	Playing Giuseppe Pelosi
2005–2006	Le Centième Nom	Stéphane Aucante	By Michel Giliberti
2006	Les Grecs	Gilbert Désveaux	By Jean-Marie Besset
2006	Un Petit Pull Over Angora	David Haddad	David Haddad
2007	Rupture Entre Amis	Frédéric Rondot	Also written by Frédéric Rondot
