= America Brown (film) =

- Directed by: Paul Black
- Written by: Paul Black
- Produced by: Andrew Fierberg; Christina Weiss Lurie
- Starring: Ryan Kwanten; Hill Harper; Natasha Lyonne
- Cinematography: Richard Rutkowski
- Edited by: Keiko Deguchi
- Music by: Michael Montes
- Production company: CWL
- Release dates: 9 May 2004 (Tribeca Film Festival); 28 October 2005 (US)
- Running time: 87 minutes
- Country: United States
- Language: English

America Brown is a 2004 American drama film directed by Paul Black, starring Ryan Kwanten, Hill Harper and Natasha Lyonne.

== Cast ==
- Ryan Kwanten as Ricky Brown
- Hill Harper as John Cross
- Natasha Lyonne as Vera
- Karen Black as Marianne Brown
- Élodie Bouchez as Rosie
- Leo Burmester as Bo Williams
- Frankie Faison as Coach Bryant
- Michael Rapaport as Daniel Brown

== Release ==
The film premiered at the Tribeca Film Festival on 9 May 2004.

== Reception ==
Ronnie Scheib of Variety wrote that "Name cast, occasional deft touches and nifty contrast between the two locales cannot overcome script’s terminal awkwardness."

Merle Bertrand of Film Threat rated the film 3 stars out of 5 and called it a "decent, if flawed look at life in the football spotlight".

Kevin Crust of the Los Angeles Times wrote that the "strong" cast is "capable of carrying the dramatic sequences."
