= Hinterland (1998 film) =

1998 film

- Directed by: Jacques Nolot
- Written by: Jacques Nolot
- Produced by: Laurent Bénégui
- Starring: Mathilde Moné; Henri Gardey
- Cinematography: Agnès Godard
- Edited by: Martine Giordano
- Distributed by: Mars Distribution
- Release date: May 1998 (Cannes)
- Running time: 90 minutes
- Country: France
- Language: French

Hinterland (French: L'Arrière pays) is a 1998 French drama film directed by Jacques Nolot. It was screened in the Directors' Fortnight section of the 1998 Cannes Film Festival, where it won the Award of the Youth. It was nominated for Best First Feature Film at the 24th César Awards.

Filming took place in the village of Marciac, in the Gers department.
