= Frédéric Gorny =

French actor (born 1973)

Frédéric Gorny (born 6 September 1973, in Asnières-sur-Seine) is a French actor known for his role as attorney Pierre Clément on the television series Cherif. As of 2018, he has been in about thirty television series and films since his first film, Wild Reeds (1994).

== Select filmography ==
Film
Year	Title	Role	Notes
2004	Lightweight		
2004	Le Cou de la girafe		
2002	Ma vraie vie à Rouen		
1998	The Perfect Guy	Jean-Baptiste	
1996	Tykho Moon	Konstantin	
1994	Wild Reeds	Henri Mariani	César Awards Nominee for Most Promising Actor

TV
Year	Title	Role	Notes
2010	Rocheville Manor	Antonio	
2007	War and Peace	Ramballe	
2006	Sartre, l'âge des passions		
1998-2008	Avocats et Associés	Laurent Zelder	
1998	The Count of Monte Cristo	Château-Renaud	
