= After Him =

2007 film directed by Gaël Morel

- French: Après lui
- Directed by: Gaël Morel
- Written by: Gaël Morel; Christophe Honoré
- Produced by: Laurent Lavole; Isabelle Pragier
- Starring: Catherine Deneuve
- Cinematography: Jean-Max Bernard
- Edited by: Catherine Schwartz
- Music by: Louis Sclavis
- Production company: Gloria Films
- Distributed by: 20th Century Fox
- Release date: 21 May 2007 (Cannes)
- Running time: 94 minutes
- Country: France
- Language: French

After Him (French: Après lui) is a 2007 French drama film directed by Gaël Morel. The film stars Catherine Deneuve as Camille, a woman grieving the death of her son Mathieu (Adrien Jolivet) in a car accident, who becomes obsessed with becoming a substitute mother figure to his best friend Franck (Thomas Dumerchez) with the goal of transforming him into everything she had hoped Mathieu would become.

The cast also includes Guy Marchand, Élodie Bouchez, Elli Medeiros, Luis Rego, Amina Medjoubi and Salim Kechiouche.

The film premiered on 21 May 2007 in the Director's Fortnight program at the 2007 Cannes Film Festival, prior to going into commercial release on 23 May.
