= The Giraffe's Neck =

- Film poster
- Le Cou de la girafe
- Directed by: Safy Nebbou
- Written by: Safy Nebbou; Agnès Yobregat; Danièle Thompson
- Produced by: Charles Gassot
- Starring: Sandrine Bonnaire; Claude Rich
- Cinematography: Romain Winding
- Edited by: Bernard Sasia
- Music by: Pascal Gaigne
- Production companies: Téléma; Move Movie; France 2 Cinéma
- Distributed by: UGC-Fox Distribution
- Release dates: 24 September 2004 (France & Belgium)
- Running time: 88 minutes
- Countries: France; Belgium
- Languages: French; Italian; Spanish
- Budget: $4.7 million
- Box office: $1.9 million

The Giraffe's Neck (original title: Le Cou de la girafe) is a 2004 French-Belgian film directed by Safy Nebbou.

== Cast ==
- Sandrine Bonnaire as Hélène
- Claude Rich as Paul
- Louisa Pili as Mathilde
- Darry Cowl as Léo
- Philippe Leroy as Maxime
- Maurice Chevit as Maurice
- Monique Mélinand as Madeleine
- Marie Mergey as Émilie
- Geneviève Rey-Penchenat as Marguerite
- Paul Pavel as M. Achraf
- Françoise Jamet as Lucie
- Sarah Boreo as Renée
- Arlette Didier as Josette
- Stéphane Bissot as Stéphanie
- Frédéric Gorny as L'inspecteur
