= Three Dancing Slaves =

- French Poster
- French: Le Clan
- Directed by: Gaël Morel
- Written by: Christophe Honoré; Gaël Morel
- Produced by: Philippe Jacquier
- Starring: Nicolas Cazalé; Stéphane Rideau; Thomas Dumerchez; Salim Kechiouche; Bruno Lochet; Vincent Martinez; Jackie Berroyer; Aure Atika
- Cinematography: Jean-Max Bernard
- Edited by: Catherine Schwartz
- Music by: Camille Rocailleuxe
- Distributed by: ID Distribution
- Release date: 16 June 2004
- Running time: 90 minutes
- Country: France
- Language: French

Three Dancing Slaves (French: Le Clan) is a 2004 French film directed by Gaël Morel.

== Plot ==
Annecy is no tourist destination for three working-class brothers and their father, in the months after their mother has died. Marc (Nicolas Cazalé) is deeply troubled: he tries to stiff drug dealers and then plots revenge. Christophe (Stéphane Rideau) is released from jail, lands a job, and must overcome various temptations in order to keep it. Olivier (Thomas Dumerchez), nearing 18, may be falling in love with Hicham (Salim Kechiouche), a young man who regularly practises capoeira on the shores of the lake. Both violence and fraternity are close to the surface of most interactions. How each brother emerges from his challenge comprises the film's drama. The film discusses how these men can form a family.

== Cast ==
- Nicolas Cazalé as Marc
- Stéphane Rideau as Christophe
- Thomas Dumerchez as Olivier
- Salim Kechiouche as Hicham
- Bruno Lochet as the father
- Vincent Martinez as "Professeur"
- Jackie Berroyer as Robert
- Aure Atika as Emilie
- Nicolas Paz as Montana
- Mathias Olivier as Ryan
- Gary Mary as Luc
- Geordie Piseri-Diaz as Jérémy
- Clément Dettli as Henry
- Pierre Vallin as Sly
- Janine Ribollet as Sly's mother
