= Mayette =

Mayette may refer to:

- Muriel Mayette (born 1964), a French actress
- a walnut cultivar
