= Tell Me I'm Dreaming =

1998 film

- Directed by: Claude Mouriéras
- Written by: Claude Mouriéras
- Produced by: Philippe Carcassonne
- Starring: Frédéric Pierrot
- Cinematography: William Lubtchansky
- Edited by: Monique Dartonne
- Release date: 3 June 1998
- Running time: 97 minutes
- Country: France
- Language: French

Tell Me I'm Dreaming (French: Dis-moi que je rêve) is a 1998 French drama film directed by Claude Mouriéras. It was screened in the Un Certain Regard section at the 1998 Cannes Film Festival.

== Cast ==
- Frédéric Pierrot - Luc
- Muriel Mayette - Jeanne
- Vincent Dénériaz - Julien
- Cédric Vieira - Jules
- Julien Charpy - Yannick
- Stéphanie Frey - Marion
- Suzanne Gradel - Grandmother
- Christophe Delachaux - Johnny
- Yvon Davis - Psychiatrist
- Katya Medici - Nini
- Patrice Verdeil - Policeman
- Hélène Wert - Charlotte
- Karine Kadi - Young doctor
- Rebecca Mahboubi - Talkative friend
