= Poetical Refugee =

2001 film by Abdellatif Kechiche

- Directed by: Abdellatif Kechiche
- Written by: Abdellatif Kechiche
- Produced by: Jean-François Lepetit
- Starring: Élodie Bouchez; Sami Bouajila; Aure Atika; Bruno Lochet
- Cinematography: Dominique Brenguier; Marie-Emmanuelle Spencer
- Edited by: Annick Baly; Tina Baz; Amina Mazani
- Distributed by: Rézo Films
- Release date: February 14, 2001
- Running time: 130 minutes
- Country: France
- Language: French
- Budget: $1.9 million

Poetical Refugee (French: La Faute à Voltaire) is a 2001 French drama film directed by Abdellatif Kechiche, starring Sami Bouajila, Élodie Bouchez and Bruno Lochet. It was Kechiche‘s debut feature film and was awarded the Luigi De Laurentiis Award at the Venice Film Festival for best first film, winning seven awards, overall, at different film festivals.

== Plot ==
Like Voltaire‘s Candide in his eponymous novel, Jallel, a young North African man, dreaming of better prospects, immigrates illegally to France. He struggles at first as he is unable to find work and finds it difficult to make friends. But soon he gets to sell fruits in the underground, albeit illegally. He also makes some new friends and then falls in love. But his dreams of success remain unrealized as he comes to discover and share the solidarity of the other outcasts going from one encounter to the other, making his way through Paris, from hostels to immigrant aid societies and social welfare groups, living among the excluded and the destitute.

== Cast ==
- Élodie Bouchez : Lucie
- Sami Bouajila : Jallel
- Aure Atika : Nassera
- Bruno Lochet : Franck
- Mustapha Adouani : Mostfa
- Carole Franck : Barbara
- Virginie Darmon : Leila
- Olivier Loustau : Antonio
- François Genty : Paul
- Sami Zitouni : Nono
- Jean-Michel Fête : Philippe
- Manuel Le Lièvre : André

== Critical reception ==
"With superb performances by Sami Bouajila (Bye Bye), Aure Atika and Elodie Bouchez (The Dream Life of Angels), Poetical Refugee offers a moving and tender portrayal of life on the margins, a review by Cinema of the World noted.

== Accolades ==
- Angers European First Film Festival-2001
  - European Special Jury Award
  - Jean Carmet Award for the ensemble of actors.
- Cologne Mediterranean Film Festival-2001
  - Best Actress to Élodie Bouchez
- Namur International Festival of French-Speaking Film-2000
  - Jury Special Prize
  - Youth Jury Emile Cantillon Award
  - Nominated for Golden Bayard, for Best Film
- Venice Film Festival-2000
  - Cinema for Peace Award
  - Luigi De Laurentiis Award
