= Mud (1997 film) =

1997 film by Ivaylo Simidchiev

Mud (original title Kal) is a 1997 Bulgarian short drama film written, directed and produced by Ivaylo Simidchiev. It was shot on 35 mm black and white film with a runtime of 22 minutes.

== Plot ==
The film is about a foreigner in Bulgaria, who gets accidentally involved in chasing a stray child. During the action, the child injures him, but then tries to save him.

== Cast ==
- Blagoje Nikolic – Foreigner
- Petar Vasilev – Gipsy kid
- Phillip Avramov – Gipsy gang chief
- Dafina Katzarraska
- Krasimir Kolev
- Traian Borisov
- Krasimir Jelev
- Stefan Shopov
- Asen Vasilev

== Awards ==
- Official Selection at the Cinéfondation of the 1998 Cannes Film Festival
- "A Certain Regard" Award for Cinematography, Popovo, Bulgaria, 1998
- "Most Surprising Film" Award, Odense Film festival, Denmark, 1998
- "Kodak's Best Film" Award, Sofia Intntnl. Student Film Festival, Bulgaria, 1998
- "Special Mention of the Jury", Festival Premiers Plans, Angers, France, 1998
- "Best Director" Award, International Munich Festival, Germany, 1997
- "VFF Young Talent Award", International Munich Festival, Germany, 1997
- "Best Balkan Short Film" Award, Short Film Festival of Drama, Greece, 1997
- "All-Russian State Cinematography Institute (VGIK) Honorable Diploma", 1997
