= Ivaylo Simidchiev =

Bulgarian film director

Ivaylo P. Simidchiev (Bulgarian: Ивайло П. Симидчиев; born February 13, 1970) is a film director, writer and producer from Bulgaria. His short film Mud won 8 international awards and was a competition selection at the 1998 Cannes Film Festival edition.

== Filmography ==
- Semi-Nuclear (2014) – director, screenwriter, producer. About people left after the Soviet Nuclear Testing Program at former Semipalatinsk (Kazakhstan) Test Site
- The Last Journey (2010) – director, screenwriter, editor, producer Documentary. An older woman travels to say goodbye to her relatives.
- Fury (2009) – screenwriter, director, producer
- The Unseen (2005) – Production: Bulgarian National Television, Bulgaria Director 27 min. Documentary. A professional night club bouncer founds a martial arts club among blind schoolchildren.
- On Suicide (2005) – director, screenwriter, editor, producer An analysis of suicide’s increasing death rates worldwide.
- CINEMETT or… the Time's Coming for the Cat and the Dog to Get Together (2004) – director, screenwriter, editor. Follows six young heroin-dependent people over two years.
- 3:33 A.M. (2002) – director, screenwriter, editor, producer; adaptation of the play "My Legs at Night, My Breast at Noon", by Ivaylo Simidchiev.
- The war between sexes has no day off...
- Lemon is Lemon (2001) – director, screenwriter, editor Documentary, received four US awards. Five guys gather in an abandoned building, cook up and shoot up dope. Later they chat.
- Mud (1997) – Production: Director, Screenwriter, Producer fiction film. A foreign visitor finds himself accidentally involved in a chase for a stray child. The latter seriously injures him, but will also try in his own way to save him.

== Theatre ==
- "Macbeth" by William Shakespeare 2008; Production: "Help for children at risk" association, Bulgaria Director, Multimedia artist
  Part of the "School-Theatre-Life" project funded by Cooperating Netherlands Foundations for Central and Eastern Europe (CNF).
- "A Midsummer night’s dream" by William Shakespeare 2000-2001; Production: Technosid BG Ltd., Bulgaria Director, Producer
  An acting school project, aimed at preserving and creating the proper evolution conditions for young and promising acting talent.
- "My Legs at Night, my Breasts – at Noon" by Ivaylo Simidchiev, 1999-2000; Production: Technosid BG Ltd., Bulgaria Playwright, Director, Art Director, Producer; State Theatre of Satire in Sofia.

== Awards ==
For "Mud" (1997):

- "A Certain Regard" Award for Cinematography, Popovo, Bulgaria, 1998
- "Most Surprising Film" Award, 13th International Odense Film festival, Denmark, 1998
- "Kodak's Best Film" Award, Sofia International Student Film Festival, Bulgaria, 1998
- "Special Mention of the Jury", 10th Festival Premiers Plans, Angers, France, 1998
- "Best Director" Award, International Munich Festival of Film Schools, Germany, 1997
- "VFF Young Talent Award", International Munich Festival of Film Schools, Germany, 1997
- "Best Balkan Short Film" Award, International Short Film Festival of Drama, Greece, 1997
- "All Russian State Cinematography Institute Honorable Diploma" Varna International Film Festival, Bulgaria, 1997

For "Lemon is Lemon" (2001):

- "The Face of Drugs" Award, Palm Springs International Festival of Short Films in 2001
- "Best Short Documentary" Award, Cinequest Film Festival, 2002
- "Honorable Mention", Ann Arbor International Film Festival 2002
- "Director's Citation" Award, 23rd Black Maria Film & Video Festival (New Jersey) 2003
