= Perry Blake =

Irish singer-songwriter

- Born: 10 May 1970 (age 56); Sligo, Ireland
- Occupations: Singer; songwriter
- Instrument: Vocals
- Years active: 1998–present
- Labels: Polydor; Naive; Blu Orchard; Warner France; Reekus; Moochin' About

Perry Blake (born 10 May 1970) is an Irish singer and songwriter from Sligo, Ireland, known for the delicate, downtempo, melancholic style of his songs and his soft singing voice.

== Career ==
Blake's 1998 self-titled debut album was successful in the United Kingdom and won critical praise. His first single, "The Hunchback Of San Francisco", came from this album. His second release, Still Life, contained contributions from Steve Jansen, while his third album, California, was co-produced with Italian composer Marco Sabiu and featured Dickon Hinchliffe of Tindersticks and the former Prefab Sprout drummer Neil Conti.

Blake is popular in France, where his music was used for the soundtracks of the films Presque rien (2000, for which he also wrote the original music) and Trois Petites Filles (2004).

Blake's musical influences include Leonard Cohen, David Sylvian, Scott Walker, and Nick Drake. He has collaborated with Françoise Hardy and wrote two songs for her award-winning Tant de belles choses album. He has also worked with French electronic star Émilie Simon.

In June 2014, Blake released an electronic pop album, Modern Love under the name Electro Sensitive Behaviour, with longtime collaborators Glenn Garrett and Graham Murphy, whom he has worked with since his first album in 1998.

Perry is now signed to and managed by Cumbrian-based label Moochin' About. A new single featuring actor Paul McGann was released in 2023, with a new album due in late 2023.

== Discography ==
Studio albums

- Perry Blake (1998) (Polydor)
- Still Life (1999) (Naive)
- California (2002) (Naive)
- Songs for Someone (2004) (Naive)
- The Crying Room (2006) (Blu Orchard/Warner France)
- Canyon Songs (2007) (Reekus Records)
- Songs Of Praise (2019) (Moochin' About)
- New Years Wish (2020) (Moochin' About)
- Death of a society girl (2024) (Moochin' About)

Live albums

- Broken Statues (Live at Cirque Royal, Nuits Botanique, Brussels on 29 September 2000) (2001) (Naive)

Soundtracks

- Presque rien (2000) (Naive)

Others

- Modern Love (2014) (Orchard-Lily, iTunes release) as Electro Sensitive Behaviour
