= Shadow counsel =

Type of lawyer

Shadow counsel or a shadow lawyer is a term used in law to mean an appointed, duplicate lawyer as an auxiliary or alternate, should the original lawyer (or legal team) fail in some way.

Shadow counsel is a legal term referring to a second lawyer that is appointed in secrecy to protect a witness from the other defendants who may be sharing the same lawyer (and thus, the known appointed lawyer is biased). Such a situation could be a drug conspiracy or people forced into being accomplices by a mob leader. Shadow counsel advises in the best interests of the witness. Lawyer and former prosecutor and judge Leslie Crocker Snyder invoked the privilege for a defendant whose trial she presided over so he could be safe as an informant against a drug ring leader he was afraid would replace his counsel. Despite its full legal allowance, Snyder faced serious backlash from opposition deliberately being uninformed in the interest of maintaining the trial's security. Some fictional, yet informative, examples would be the Law & Order episode "Shadow" (season 8, episode 8) and the Law & Order: SVU episode "Ace" (season 11, episode 22). Snyder was a consultant for the franchise for both the original program and for Trial by Jury between 2004-2007; she also made 3 guest appearances on Law & Order in these years. The concept also appeared in Season 5, Episode 10 of The Practice, "Friends and Ex-Lovers."
