= Gaël Morel =

French film director, screenwriter and actor

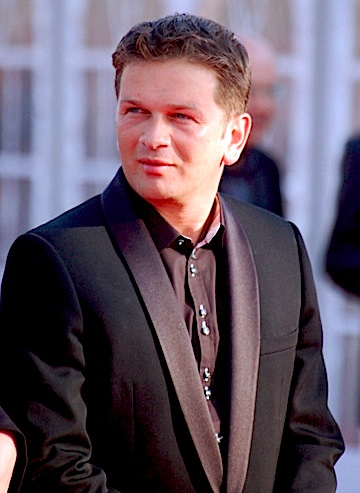
- Morel at the 2007 Deauville American Film Festival
- Born: 25 September 1972 (age 53); Villefranche-sur-Saône, Rhône, France
- Occupations: Actor, director, screenwriter
- Years active: 1994–present

Gaël Morel (born 25 September 1972) is a French film director, screenwriter and actor.

== Life and career ==
Morel was born in Villefranche-sur-Saône, Rhône, France, a town of 30,000 inhabitants outside Lyon. He grew up in the nearby village of Lacenas in the Villefranche district.

At the age of 15, Morel left home to pursue film studies in Lyon, and later moved to Paris. There he met French director André Téchiné, who cast him in the lead role of François in the multi-César Award-winning 1994 film Wild Reeds (Les Roseaux sauvages), which brought him fame, earning much critical praise for his performance and a 1995 César nomination for Most Promising Young Actor.

While his Wild Reeds co-stars Élodie Bouchez and Stéphane Rideau have both gone on to successful acting careers (he has often cast them in his own films), Morel has chosen to write and direct.

On April 7, 2009, he co-signed an open letter against the HADOPI law. In January 2013, he co-signed a manifesto in Le Nouvel Observateur in favor of marriage equality; for this newspaper, he reflected on his experiences as a gay man.

== Filmography ==
=== As actor ===
Year	Title	Role	Director
1994	Wild Reeds (Les Roseaux sauvages)	François	André Téchiné
1995	Le Plus Bel Âge	Bertrand	Didier Haudepin
1998	Zonzon	Grandjean	Laurent Bouhnik
2001	Far	François	André Téchiné

=== As director ===
Year	Title
1994	La Vie à Rebours
1996	Full Speed (À toute vitesse)
1999	First Snow (Premières neiges)
2002	Under Another Sky (Les chemins de l'oued)
2004	3 Dancing Slaves (Le Clan)
2007	After Him (Après lui)
2008	New Wave
2011	Our Paradise (Notre Paradis)
2017	Catch the Wind (Prendre le large)
2024	To Live, To Die, To Live Again (Vivre, Mourir, Renaître)

== Awards ==
- 1995 - César nomination : Meilleur Espoir Masculin (Most Promising Young Actor) for Les Roseaux sauvages
- 2002 - FIPRESCI Prize, Toronto International Film Festival, for Under Another Sky (Les chemins de l'oued)
