= Claude Mouriéras =

French film director

- Born: 27 September 1953 (age 72); Lyon, France
- Occupations: Film director Screenwriter
- Years active: 1989-present

Claude Mouriéras (born 27 September 1953) is a French film director and screenwriter. He has directed nine films since 1989. His film Dis-moi que je rêve was screened in the Un Certain Regard section at the 1998 Cannes Film Festival.

== Filmography ==
- Montalvo et l'enfant (1989)
- L'écrivain, le peintre, le funambule (1990)
- Paroles d'acteurs de la Comédie-Française (1993)
- Sale gosse (1995)
- Dis-moi que je rêve (1998)
- Tout va bien, on s'en va (2000)
- Le prêt, la poule et l'oeuf (2002)
- Le voyage des femmes de Zartalé (2005)
- Kady, la belle vie (2008)
