= Presque rien =

- Theatrical release poster
- Directed by: Sébastien Lifshitz
- Written by: Sébastien Lifshitz; Stéphane Bouquet
- Produced by: Christian Tison; Jean-Christophe Colson; Cécile Amillat
- Starring: Jérémie Elkaïm; Stéphane Rideau
- Cinematography: Pascal Poucet
- Edited by: Jann Dedet
- Music by: Perry Blake
- Production company: Radio Télévision Belge Francofone
- Distributed by: Ad Vitam Distribution
- Release dates: 7 June 2000 (France); 16 May 2001 (Belgium)
- Running time: 100 minutes
- Countries: France; Belgium
- Language: French
- Box office: $326,484

Presque rien, also titled Almost Nothing in the UK and Come Undone in the US, is a 2000 French-Belgian romantic drama film directed by Sebastien Lifshitz, set in Brittany, depicting a stormy holiday romance between two teenagers and what remains of that relationship eighteen months later.

== Plot ==
Upper-middle class Mathieu, is spending his summer vacation on the French coast before beginning studies in the autumn to become an architect. His mother is deeply depressed because of the death of his baby brother from cancer, and is cared for by her sister, while Mathieu and his moody younger sister cannot get along.

Then he meets Cédric at the beach, who is attractive and obviously looking for a boyfriend. The boys embark on a romance, and Mathieu's sudden secrecy and long hours away from home invite the curiosity of both his sister and aunt.

A parallel plotline focuses on Mathieu eighteen months later, as he recovers from the shock of their separation. After Mathieu has tried to commit suicide, he chooses to go back to the small seaside town to learn how to deal with what happened.

The film ends on a hopeful note when Mathieu looks up Pierre, another former boyfriend of Cédric's living in the seaside town, and they overcome past tensions to discover that they understand each other.

== Cast ==
- Jérémie Elkaïm as Mathieu
- Stéphane Rideau as Cédric
- Dominique Reymond as Mother
- Marie Matheron as Annick
- Laetitia Legrix as Sarah
- Nils Ohlund as Pierre

== Production ==
Rather than having a clear, chronologically ordered narrative, the movie switches between the summer and the winter plotlines, depicting the differences in Mathieu's life at both points, as well as establishing the contrast between one and the other visually.

== Soundtrack ==
The soundtrack uses songs by Irish singer and songwriter Perry Blake (from his album Still Life) to convey Mathieu's melancholic, depressive mood.

== See also ==
- List of lesbian, gay, bisexual, or transgender-related films by storyline
