= Mangwana =

Mangwana is a surname. Notable people with the surname include:

- Paul Mangwana (born 1961), Zimbabwean politician
- Sam Mangwana (born 1945), Congolese musician
