= Stéphane Rideau =

French actor (born 1976)

- Born: 25 July 1976 (age 49); Agen, France
- Occupation: Actor
- Years active: 1994–present

Stéphane Rideau (born 25 July 1976) is a French actor. Although intending to pursue a career in sports, he was discovered in 1992 at a rugby game and then auditioned for a role in the film Les Roseaux sauvages (Wild Reeds) by André Téchiné. He was, at the time, sixteen years old.

He later played the role of a gay teenager in Presque rien (Come Undone) directed by Sébastien Lifshitz. Rideau has a long acting experience that includes the films Loin, Le Ventre de Juliette, Le Clan and Le Cadeau d'Élena. He currently lives with his partner Celia and their daughter.

== Filmography ==
Year	Title	Role	Notes
1994	Wild Reeds	Serge	
1994	Le Banquet		Short film
1995	La vie à rebours		Short film
1995	Never Twice		Short film
1995	Revivre	Antoine	
1995	Sixième classique	Mitou	TV movie
1995	Verdict		TV series
1996	La Passion du docteur Bergh		
1996	Le juge est une femme		TV series
1996	Full Speed		
1996	Mauvais genre		
1996	Ca ne se refuse pas		
1998	Sitcom		
1998	Beaucoup trop loin		Short film
1998	Un homme en colère		TV series
1999	Les passagers		
1999	Premières neiges		
2000	Lokarri		
2000	Presque Rien		
2001	Loin		
2001	Le ventre de Juliette		
2002	Les pygmées de Carlo		
2002	La merveilleuse odyssée de l'idiot Toboggan		
2003	Le cadeau d'Elena		
2004	Dernière cigarette		Short film
2004	Three Dancing Slaves		
2011	Notre Paradis	Vassili	
2011	Brassens, la mauvaise réputation	Georges Brassens	TV movie
2011	Les Hommes Libres	Francis	
2013	Section de recherches	Filip Esquibel	TV series
2014	La vallée des mensonges	Marcel	TV movie
2015	The Boss's Daughter	Marc	
2024	My New Friends		(Panorama – 2024 Berlin Film Festival)
2024	To Live, To Die, To Live Again (Vivre, mourir, renaître)		
