= Our Paradise (film) =

- Theatrical release poster
- French: Notre paradis
- Directed by: Gaël Morel
- Written by: Gaël Morel
- Produced by: Paulo Branco
- Starring: Stéphane Rideau; Dimitri Durdaine; Béatrice Dalle
- Cinematography: Nicolas Dixmier
- Edited by: Catherine Schwartz
- Music by: Camille Rocailleux; Louis Sclavis
- Distributed by: Alfama Film
- Release date: 28 September 2011
- Running time: 96 minutes
- Country: France
- Language: French
- Budget: €600,000 (estimated)

Our Paradise (French: Notre Paradis) is a 2011 French film written and directed by Gaël Morel.

== Plot ==
Vassili is an aging Paris hustler who has a hard time accepting he is growing too old for his profession. He lashes out by strangling one of his clients who had commented on his age. Later that night he finds an unconscious teenager in the Bois de Boulogne (a cruising park) who was apparently also hustling and has been beaten and robbed. The boy claims not to remember his name or anything else from his past, so Vassili takes him to his apartment and christens the boy Angelo due to his angelic appearance and an angel tattoo on his abdomen. The two begin a relationship that is purely sexual at first but later develops into a romantic connection and savage serial killings by the pair of older or defenseless gay men.

Vassili and Angelo begin hustling together. One client wants to have sex only with Angelo and sends Vassili home; however, Vassili hides in the client's apartment and kills him after Angelo has left. A later murder takes place in Angelo's presence, and he is complacent about it. Some of the murders seem to be motivated by Vassili's wanting to protect Angelo, but others are motivated by greed and Vasilli's hurt pride.

The film now introduces a young boy also named Vassili, who lives with his mother Anna, a former prostitute who has a similarly hard time letting go of the past. She and Vassili are old friends, and she named her son after him although he is not the father. Trying to get away from the scenes of their crimes, Vassili and Angelo leave Paris and arrive at Anna's apartment in Lyon. Young Vassili at first fears that Vassili is trying to take his mother away from him, but he is fascinated when he learns about Vassili and Angelo's relationship. Anna, Angelo and the older Vassili have a threesome together and are very relaxed and intimate afterwards. Anna, Angelo and the two Vassilis form a loose family, in which Vassili can play the father role to young Vassili.

Angelo and the Vassilis leave for Victor's luxurious house in the mountains. Victor was Vassili's first client and takes a father role in Vassili's life, e.g. by paying the rent for Vassili's apartment. Victor's young Moroccan lover Kamel is suspicious of Vassili's and Angelo's motives and threatens to leave Victor if they stay. With some difficulty, Victor persuades Kamel to stay but tells his guests that he and Kamel will need some time by themselves to mend their relationship. Vassili replies that this is no problem and that they will depart the next day. Privately, however, he complains to Angelo that Victor is like all the other clients after all and later murders Victor and Kamel with help from Angelo. Young Vassili witnesses the murder of Victor but promises not to tell anybody.

Anna arrives a few days later, and she, Vassili and Angelo have another threesome that night. Young Vassili hears the moaning sounds, sees his mother limp and apparently unconscious between the two men in bed, and believes they have killed her too. He runs out of the house and tells the police about the murders; early the next morning they apprehend Vassili and Angelo.

== Cast ==
- Stéphane Rideau as Vassili
- Dimitri Durdaine as Angelo
- Béatrice Dalle as Anna
- Didier Flamand as Victor
- Mathis Morisset as Young Vassili
- Malik Issolah as Kamel
