= The Dreamlife of Angels =

1998 film by Erick Zonca

- Theatrical release poster
- French: La Vie rêvée des anges
- Directed by: Erick Zonca
- Written by: Erick Zonca; Roger Bohbot
- Produced by: François Marquis
- Starring: Élodie Bouchez; Natacha Régnier; Grégoire Colin; Patrick Mercado; Jo Prestia
- Cinematography: Agnès Godard; Dominique Le Rigoleur
- Edited by: Yannick Kergoat
- Music by: Yann Tiersen
- Production companies: Les Productions Bagheera; France 3 Cinéma; Diaphana
- Distributed by: Diaphana
- Release dates: May 1998 (Cannes); 16 September 1998 (France)
- Running time: 113 minutes
- Country: France
- Language: French
- Budget: FFR10.2 million ($1.75 million)
- Box office: $7.75 million (France)

The Dreamlife of Angels (French: La Vie rêvée des anges) is a 1998 French drama film co-written and directed by Erick Zonca. The film was selected as the French entry for the Best Foreign Language Film at the 71st Academy Awards, but was not accepted as a nominee.

== Plot ==
The film is about two working class women, Isa and Marie. Isa is a drifter and searching for a lover whom she had met during the summer. When she realizes that her search for him is futile and turns elsewhere, she meets Marie, who lives in a small French town near Lille. The two young women instantly find a connection as they both have been treated harshly by life and are living from day to day in short-time jobs, such as working in a textile factory or delivering leaflets in the streets. Marie lives in an apartment that she is looking after because the owners had a car accident in which everyone died, except for Sandrine, a teenager, who is in a coma. Marie invites Isa to live with her. Shortly thereafter Isa and Marie meet up with two bouncers, Fredo and Charly, whom they befriend. The men help them out and they have genuine fun together, although they are not much better off than the women.

Isa is the kind of girl who always lands on her own two feet and has a casual c'est la vie attitude when it comes to life and generally doesn't let the hardships get to her, while Marie finds it hard to express herself emotionally, and gets angry when she feels vulnerable. Marie cannot put up with the way she is tossed around by the world, and so, despite being in a relationship with Charly, she tries to escape through a local playboy, Chriss, a rich nightclub owner, who regularly goes out with girls and views Marie as just another one of his random flings. Isa is tougher in that she can take the beating and stick with what is around her, and does not get carried away by the false possibility of a better life. Significantly, Isa refuses to sleep with her casual boyfriend Fredo, drawing her strength from within, while Marie is emotionally dependent on Chriss, who, it is clear, does not love her. Isa is well aware of Chriss's true intentions and tries to warn Marie, who refuses to listen.

Isa finds Sandrine's diary and reads it to her during visits in the hospital. Meanwhile, Chriss decides to end his fling with Marie. Instead of breaking up with her in person, he asks Isa to tell her for him (she replies "it's not for me to tell her"), clearly afraid Marie would self-destruct in front of him, then leaving Marie's later calls unreturned. Meanwhile, Sandrine comes out of her coma, but Isa, who has visited her so faithfully while she was in a coma, decides not to see her while she is awake. After finally learning about Chriss' decision to end the relationship, Marie jumps out of a window. The film ends with Isa starting to work in a new factory.

== Cast ==
- Élodie Bouchez as Isabelle "Isa" Tostin
- Natacha Régnier as Marie Thomas
- Grégoire Colin as Chriss
- Patrick Mercado as Charly
- Jo Prestia as Fredo
- Louise Motte as Sandrine
- Frédérique Hazard as Marie's mother
- Corinne Masiero as Hollywood's woman
- Francine Massenhave as hospital attendant
- Zivko Niklevski as Yugoslavian textile employer
- Murielle Colvez as shop foreperson
- Lyazid Ouelhadj as ticket salesman
- Jean-Michel Lemahieu as the intern
- Rosa Maria as the first nurse

== Comas in films ==
Research by Dr. Eelco Wijdicks on the depiction of comas in movies was published in Neurology in May 2006. Dr. Wijdicks studied 30 films (made between 1970 and 2004) that portrayed actors in prolonged comas, and he concluded that only two films accurately depicted the state of a coma victim and the agony of waiting for a patient to awaken: Reversal of Fortune (1990), which was based on actual events, and The Dreamlife of Angels (1998). The remaining 28 were criticised for portraying miraculous awakenings with no lasting side effects; unrealistic depictions of treatments and equipment required; and comatose patients remaining tanned, muscular, and suspiciously well turned out.

== Reception ==
=== Box office ===
The film grossed $7.75 million in France and was the most profitable French film of the year, in terms of cost-to-gross ratio.

=== Critical response ===
On the review aggregator website Rotten Tomatoes, the film holds an approval rating of 93% based on 43 reviews, with an average rating of 7.6/10. The website's critics consensus reads, "Showcasing excellent lead performances, The Dreamlife of Angels is an intelligent, absorbing character study of two women."

=== Accolades ===
- 1998 Cannes Film Festival
  - Won: Best Actress award: Élodie Bouchez and Natacha Régnier
  - Nominated: Palme d'Or (English: Golden Palm)
- 1999 César Awards
  - Won: Best Actress: Élodie Bouchez
  - Won: Best Film
  - Won: Most Promising Actress: Natacha Régnier
  - Nominated: Best Cinematography: Agnès Godard
  - Nominated: Best Director: Erick Zonca
  - Nominated: Best First Work: Erick Zonca
  - Nominated: Best Original Screenplay or Adaptation: Erick Zonca and Roger Bohbot
- 1999 Lumière Awards
  - Won: Best Film
  - Won: Best Director: Erick Zonca
  - Won: Best Actress: Élodie Bouchez

== See also ==
- List of submissions to the 71st Academy Awards for Best Foreign Language Film
- List of French submissions for the Academy Award for Best Foreign Language Film
