= Our Paradise (manhwa) =

South Korean webtoons

청사과 낙원 Cheongsagwa nagwon
- Author: Greeneer
- Webtoon service: Naver Webtoon (Korean); Line Webtoon (English)
- Original run: October 24, 2018 – April 28, 2024
- Volumes: 6

Our Paradise
- Country of origin: South Korea

Our Paradise (Korean: 청사과 낙원), also known as Green Apple Paradise, is a South Korean manhwa released as a webtoon written and illustrated by Greeneer. It was serialized via Naver Corporation's webtoon platform Naver Webtoon from October 2018 to April 2024, with the individual chapters collected and published into three volumes with two seasons each. An animated series will be released in 2025.
