= Jacques Mandelbaum =

French journalist and film critic

Jacques Mandelbaum (born 1 May 1958, in Neuilly-sur-Seine) is a French journalist and film critic, currently working for the newspaper Le Monde which he joined in 1995. He is the author of numerous works on the cinema including a biographical book on Jean-Luc Godard.

== Publications ==
- 1999: Hou Hsiao-hsien, collectif, éditions Les Cahiers du cinéma
- 2001: Jacques Rozier le funambule, collectif, éditions Les Cahiers du cinéma
- 2007: Jean-Luc Godard, éditions Les Cahiers du cinéma, ISBN 978-2866424800
- 2007: Le Cinéma et la Shoah, collectif, éditions Les Cahiers du cinéma
- 2008: Ingmar Bergman, éditions Les Cahiers du cinéma, ISBN 978-2866424954
- 2009: Anatomie d'un film, Grasset, ISBN 978-2246711117
