= Wild Reeds =

1994 French film

- Theatrical release poster
- Directed by: André Téchiné
- Written by: Olivier Massart; Gilles Taurand; André Téchiné
- Produced by: Georges Benayoun; Alain Sarde
- Starring: Élodie Bouchez; Gaël Morel; Stéphane Rideau; Frédéric Gorny
- Cinematography: Jeanne Lapoirie
- Edited by: Martine Giordano
- Distributed by: Pan Européenne Distribution
- Release date: 1 June 1994
- Running time: 114 minutes
- Country: France
- Language: French
- Budget: $3.8 million
- Box office: $5.2 million

Wild Reeds (French: Les Roseaux sauvages) is a 1994 French drama film directed by André Téchiné about the sexual awakening of four teenagers and their subsequent sensitive passage into adulthood at the end of the Algerian War. The film was selected as the French entry for the Best Foreign Language Film at the 67th Academy Awards, but not nominated.

== Plot ==
The film is set in the town of Villeneuve-sur-Lot and environs in southwest France in 1962. François (Gaël Morel), a shy young man from the lower middle class, is working towards his high school diploma. He spends most of his time talking about movies and literature with his best friend, Maïté (Élodie Bouchez), whose mother Mme Alvarez (Michèle Moretti) is François's French teacher. Mme Alvarez and Maïté are communists. At the boarding school, François becomes acquainted with Serge (Stéphane Rideau), the sensual son of immigrant farmers. At night, he joins François in the dormitory to chat. Finally, Serge draws François into an erotic relationship.

François discovers his homosexuality and develops a deep attraction for Serge, who has only acted out of curiosity. François confides this discovery to Maïté, who swallows her disappointment and encourages him to come out of the closet. When Serge becomes increasingly interested in Maïté, she declares herself to be interested in nobody.

Serge's brother Pierre dies while serving in the army in Algeria, and Maïté's mother suffers a nervous breakdown, having previously refused to help Pierre desert. An Algerian-born French exile, Henri (Frédéric Gorny), enrolls in the boys' boarding school and aggravates their conflicts, adding a political conflict. He is obsessed with events in Algeria and supports the OAS, which opposes Algerian independence and defends the rights of French settlers there. He treats François without sympathy and bluntly tells him to own up to his homosexuality. His political stance provokes Serge's hatred. Henri finally engages Maïté, his political opposite, where he impresses himself upon her and she dubiously submits.

Each member of the quartet develops in the course of the film, shifting repeatedly from stubborn positions to more flexible appreciations of their circumstances, explained in French class by a reading of "The Oak and the Reed", one of La Fontaine's Fables.

== Cast ==
- Élodie Bouchez as Maïté Alvarez
- Gaël Morel as François Forestier
- Stéphane Rideau as Serge Bartolo
- Frédéric Gorny as Henri Mariani
- Michèle Moretti as Madame Alvarez
- Jacques Nolot as Monsieur Morelli
- Eric Kreikenmayer as Pierre Bartolo, the Groom
- Nathalie Vignes as Irène, the Bride
- Michel Ruhl as Monsieur Cassagne
- Fatia Maite as Aicha Morelli

== Production ==
The project was first conceived as part of a television film series dealing with adolescence, Tous les garçons et les filles de leurs âges, entitled Le chêne et le roseau (The Oak and the Reed), which made up the first 55 minutes of Wild Reeds. But after completing the script, Téchiné decided to make it a full theatrical release. Based on his own life story, it is his biggest personal success in France and his most intimate film.

It is one of limited number of films on the politically delicate subject of the Algerian War. They include The Little Soldier (1963), Avoir vingt ans dans les Aurès (1972), and La Question (1977).

== Music ==
- "Barbara Ann" – The Beach Boys
- Adagio for Strings – Samuel Barber
- Wo die Zitronen blühen & Frühlingsstimmen – Johann Strauss II
- "Runaway" – Del Shannon
- "Let's Twist Again" – Chubby Checker
- "Smoke Gets in Your Eyes" – The Platters
- "Soave sia il vento" (from Così fan tutte) - Mozart

== Reception ==
=== Critical response ===
Wild Reeds has an approval rating of 100% on review aggregator website Rotten Tomatoes, based on 10 reviews, and an average rating of 8.2/10. Metacritic assigned the film a weighted average score of 83 out of 100, based on 19 critics, indicating "universal acclaim".

=== Box office ===
In France the film received limited release, playing at a total of 40 cinemas and opening in second place at the French box office gaining 37,688 admissions its opening weekend. In total the film had 589,301 admissions in France and was the 51st highest-grossing film of the year. The film opened on one screen in Montreal, Canada on 18 November 1994 and grossed $7,000 in its opening weekend. It was released in the United States on May 10, 1995 grossing $38,192 in 7 theaters, eventually grossing a total of $917,915 in the United States.

=== Accolades ===
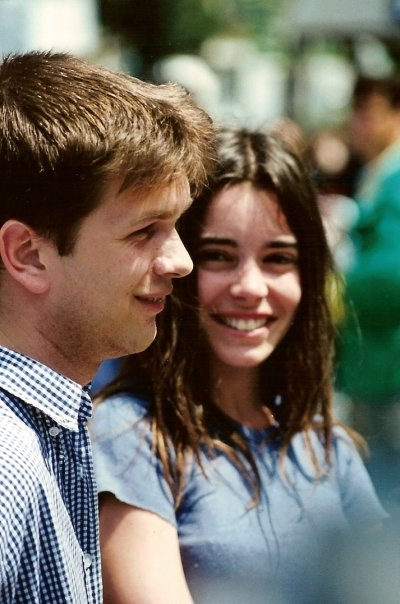
Stars Gaël Morel and Élodie Bouchez promoting the film at the 1994 Cannes Film Festival.

At the 1995 César Awards, Les Roseaux Sauvages won Best Film, Best Director (André Téchiné), Most Promising Actress (Élodie Bouchez) and Best Original Screenplay or Adaptation.

- César Awards (France)
  - Won: Best Director (André Téchiné)
  - Won: Best Film
  - Won: Best Original Screenplay or Adaptation (Olivier Massart, Gilles Taurand and André Téchiné)
  - Won: Most Promising Actress (Élodie Bouchez)
  - Nominated: Best Supporting Actress (Michèle Moretti)
  - Nominated: Most Promising Actor (Frédéric Gorny)
  - Nominated: Most Promising Actor (Gaël Morel)
  - Nominated: Most Promising Actor (Stéphane Rideau)
- Un Certain Regard, Cannes Film Festival (France)
  - Nominated
- Los Angeles Film Critics (USA)
  - Won: Best Foreign Language Film
- National Society of Film Critics (USA)
  - Won: Best Foreign Language Film
- New York Film Critics (USA)
  - Won: Best Foreign Language Film
- Won: Louis Delluc Prize

== See also ==
- List of submissions to the 67th Academy Awards for Best Foreign Language Film
- List of French submissions for the Academy Award for Best Foreign Language Film
