= Paul Black (director) =

British film director

Paul Black (born 1967, London) is a British and Canadian writer, director and producer of film and television. He is a member of the Directors Guild of America. He directed Law and Order Special Victims Unit, the independent film America Brown (Golden Zenith Award, Montréal Film Festival), and the award-winning short film Please! – starring Gerard Butler, and other works.

== Biography ==
Black emigrated to Toronto, Canada in 1975 from the UK, returning in 1991. He studied economics at McGill University in Montreal, Canada, and earned a Bachelor of Arts in psychology from York University in Toronto, Canada. In the 1990s he lived in Barcelona and then returned to London again. In the 2000s he lived in New York City and Los Angeles. Black currently lives in Berlin, with his wife and daughters.

== Awards and nominations ==
=== Won ===
- 1999 Official Selection – L.A. Film Festival for Please!
- 2000 Jury Award, Best Live Action Under 15 Minutes – Palm Springs International Festival of Short Films for Please!
- 2000 Official Selection – Edinburgh Film Festival for Please!
- 2000 Official Selection – Melbourne Film Festival for Please!
- 2000 Short Listed – British Academy of Film and Television Awards (BAFTA) for Please!
- 2001 Audience Award – Brooklyn International Film Festival for Please!
- 2004 Golden Zenith Award, Best Film from the Section Cinema and Sport – Montreal World Film Festival for America Brown

=== Nominations ===
- 2007 Nominee – Best Narrative Tribeca Film Festival for America Brown
- 2007 Nominee – Best Film SXSW Film Festival for America Brown
