= Erick Zonca =

French film director

- Born: 10 September 1956 (age 69); Orléans, France
- Occupations: Film director, screenwriter
- Years active: 1993–present

Erick Zonca (born 10 September 1956) is a French film director and screenwriter.

His first films were shorts Rives (1992), Eternelles (1995), and Seule (1997).

Zonca is best known for his critically acclaimed and award-winning 1998 feature film debut The Dreamlife of Angels. The film won the Best Actress award at the 1998 Cannes Film Festival.

Zonca's second feature was Le Petit Voleur (The Little Thief) (1999).

His film Julia (2008) is based on John Cassavetes' 1980 film Gloria. It stars Tilda Swinton and was shot in California and Mexico.

White Soldier, a TV movie, was released in 2014. Zonca also made a French road safety PSA dramatic short film in 2015. In 2018, he directed Black Tide, starring Vincent Cassel.
