= Patrick Chesnais =

French actor, film director and screenwriter

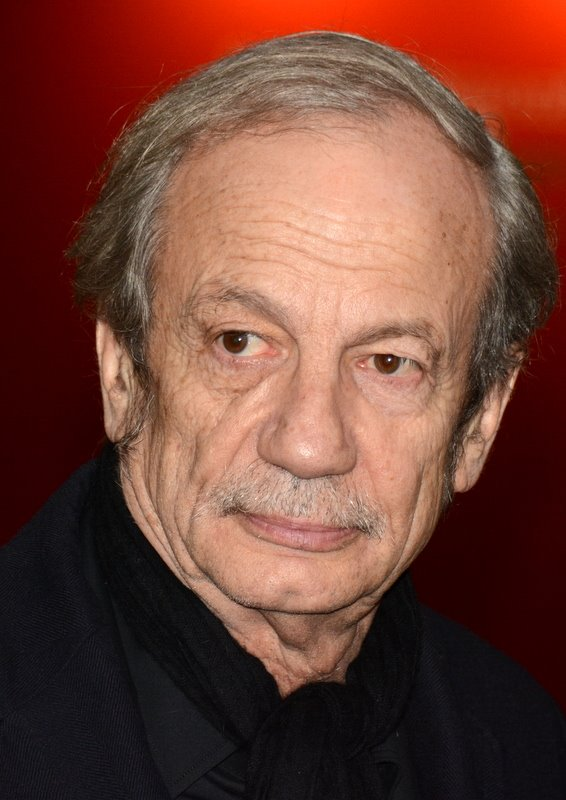
- Patrick Chesnais at the César Awards 2014
- Born: 18 March 1947 (age 79); La Garenne-Colombes, Hauts-de-Seine, France
- Occupations: Actor, film director, screenwriter
- Years active: 1963–present
- Spouse: Josiane Stoléru

Patrick Chesnais (French: [patʁik ʃɛnɛ]; born 18 March 1947) is a French actor, film director and screenwriter.

== Life and career ==
Patrick Chesnais was born in La Garenne-Colombes, Hauts-de-Seine. He was educated at the Lycée Pierre Corneille in Rouen.

In 1989, he won the César Award for Best Actor in a Supporting Role for his performance in the film La Lectrice directed by Michel Deville. In 1994, he starred in Harold Pinter's Le Retour, and in 1992, in La Belle Histoire by Claude Lelouch.

He starred in Hany Tamba's Melodrama Habibi in 2008.

He is married to fellow actor Josiane Stoléru.

== Theater ==
Year	Title	Author	Director	Notes
1964	The Lark	Jean Anouilh	Jean Anouilh & Roland Piétri	
1965	La Convention de Belzebir	Marcel Aymé	René Dupuy	
1967	The Lark	Jean Anouilh	Jean Anouilh & Roland Piétri	
1967	Pauvre Bitos ou le Dîner de têtes	Jean Anouilh	Jean Anouilh & Roland Piétri	
1968	La Dame de Chicago	Frédéric Dard	Jacques Charon	
1969	Zozo	Jean Auclair	Jean Auclair	
1970	Barberine	Alfred de Musset	Patrick Chesnais	
1971	Les Misérables	Victor Hugo	Patrick Chesnais	
1971	The Cherry Orchard	Anton Chekhov	Pierre Debauche	
1971–1972	Twelfth Night	William Shakespeare	Denis Llorca	
1972	Le Jeune Homme	Jean Audureau	Pierre Debauche	
1973	Scapin the Schemer	Molière	Jacques Weber	
1973	Deux et deux font seul	Philippe Madral	Philippe Madral	
1974	Un étrange après-midi	Andonis Doriadis	Guy Lauzin	
1974	Qui est-ce qui frappe ici si tôt ?	Philippe Madral	Philippe Madral	
1975	Folies bourgeoises	Roger Planchon	Roger Planchon	
1975	A.A. Les Théâtres	Arthur Adamov	Roger Planchon	
1976	La Comédie sans titre ou La Régénération	Italo Svevo	Robert Gironès	
1976–1977	Gl'innamorati	Carlo Goldoni	Caroline Huppert	
1977	Laughable Loves	Milan Kundera	Jacques Lassalle	
1977	Par delà les marronniers	Jean-Michel Ribes	Jean-Michel Ribes	
1978	La Turista	Sam Shepard	Henri Pillisbury	
1978	Le Gros Oiseau	Jean Bouchaud	Jean-Michel Ribes	
1978	Nina c'est autre chose	Michel Vinaver	Jacques Lassalle	
1978	Dissident il va sans dire	Michel Vinaver	Jacques Lassalle	
1980–1981	The Marriage of Figaro	Pierre Beaumarchais	Françoise Petit & Maurice Vaudaux	
1981	Le Gros Oiseau	Jean Bouchaud	Jean-Michel Ribes	
1981	Le Bleu de l'eau de vie	Carlos Semprún	Roger Blin	
1981	Les Trente Millions de Gladiator	Eugène Marin Labiche	Françoise Petit	
1982	The Importance of Being Earnest	Oscar Wilde	Pierre Boutron	
1983	This Strange Animal	Gabriel Arout	Jean Bouchaud	
1984	Love	Murray Schisgal	Michel Fagadau	
1986	Adriana Monti	Natalia Ginzburg	Maurice Bénichou	
1986	Finalement quoi	Philippe Madral	Patrick Chesnais	
1986	The Misanthrope	Molière	Françoise Petit	
1988	A Day in the Death of Joe Egg	Peter Nichols	Michel Fagadau	Nominated - Molière Award for Best Actor
1994	The Homecoming	Harold Pinter	Bernard Murat	
1997	Molly Sweeney	Brian Friel	Jorge Lavelli	
1998	Skylight	David Hare	Bernard Murat	Nominated - Molière Award for Best Actor
1998	Burn This	Lanford Wilson	Stéphane Meldegg	
2000	Dinner with Friends	Donald Margulies	Michel Fagadau	
2001	Love	Murray Schisgal	Michel Fagadau	
2002	Putain de soirée	Daniel Colas	Daniel Colas	
2003–2004	L'Invité	David Pharao	Jean-Luc Moreau	
2005	Une heure et demie de retard	Jean Dell & Gérald Sibleyras	Bernard Murat	
2009–2010	Cochons d'Inde	Sébastien Thiéry	Anne Bourgeois	Molière Award for Best Actor
2011	Toutou	Agnès & Daniel Besse	Anne Bourgeois	
2012	Tartuffe	Molière	Marion Bierry	
2013	La Vérité	Florian Zeller	Patrice Kerbrat	
2013	L'Heure univers	Christian Oster & Fyodor Dostoevsky	Patrick Chesnais	
2013	Address Unknown	Kathrine Taylor	Delphine de Malherbe	
2014	Dostoïevsky, le démon du jeu	Virgil Tănase	Isabelle Rattier	
2015–2016	Le Souper	Jean-Claude Brisville	Daniel Benoin	
2016	L'Invité	David Pharao	Jean-Luc Moreau	
2016	Une famille modèle	Ivan Calbérac	Anne Bourgeois	
2017	Honneur à notre élue	Marie NDiaye	Frédéric Bélier-Garcia	
2017	Tant qu'il y a de l'amour	Bob Martet	Anne Bourgeois	
2018	Tu te souviendras de moi	François Archambault	Daniel Benoin	

== Filmography ==
Year	Title	Role	Director	Notes
1970	Aux quatre coins	Jean	Pierre Sabbagh	TV movie
1976	Monsieur Albert	François	Jacques Renard	
1976	Les naufragés de l'île de la Tortue	Gérard	Jacques Rozier	
1978	Dossier 51	Hadès	Michel Deville	
1978	Poker menteuses et révolver matin	Subscriber to 'Detective'	Christine van de Putte	
1979	Rien ne va plus	Jeffy / Inspector Lujon	Jean-Michel Ribes	
1979	Laisse-moi rêver	Paul	Robert Ménégoz	
1979	Au bout du bout du banc	Billy	Peter Kassovitz	
1980	La provinciale	Pascal	Claude Goretta	
1980	Ras le coeur !	Vernier	Daniel Colas	
1980	Premier voyage	Yan Lambert	Nadine Trintignant	
1980	L'oeil du maître	Marc Dumas	Stéphane Kurc	
1980	Cocktail Molotov	Rucker	Diane Kurys	
1980	Le règlement intérieur	Jacques Villemain	Michel Vuillermet	
1980	L'Empreinte des géants	Martial Dromner	Robert Enrico	
1981	Neige	The first Inspector	Juliet Berto & Jean-Henri Roger	
1981	La guerre des insectes	Michel Servin	Peter Kassovitz	TV movie
1981	Les héritiers	Bob	Serge Leroy	TV series (1 episode)
1982	Sans un mot	The seducer	Gérard Poitou-Weber	TV movie
1982	L'infini est au haut des marches	Charlie	Stéphane Kurc	TV movie
1982	Contes modernes: A propos du travail	The bus passenger	Gérard Marx	TV movie
1982	De bien étranges affaires	Kill	Laurent Heynemann	TV series (1 episode)
1983	Cap Canaille	Wim	Juliet Berto & Jean-Henri Roger	
1983	Les sacrifiés	Gino	Okacha Touita	
1983	Croquignole	Croquignole	Jean Brard	TV movie
1984	Femmes de personne	Marc	Christopher Frank	
1984	Jacques le fataliste et son maître	Jacques	Claude Santelli	TV movie
1984	Les timides aventures d'un laveur de carreaux	Riton	Jean Brard	TV movie
1984	Cinéma 16	Inspector Marion	Patty Villiers	TV series (1 episode)
1985	Blanche et Marie	Germinal	Jacques Renard	
1985	Vive la mariée	Kahouami	Jean Valère	TV movie
1985	Le génie du faux	Johann Gelder	Stéphane Kurc	TV movie
1985	Je suis à Rio, ne m'attends pas pour dîner	Jules	Alain Ferrari	TV movie
1987	Duo solo	Maxime Robin	Jean-Pierre Delattre	
1988	The Reader	The CEO	Michel Deville	César Award for Best Supporting Actor
1988	Les années sandwiches	Arnaud	Pierre Boutron	
1988	Corentin, ou Les infortunes conjugales	The Marquis	Jean Marboeuf	
1988	Un coeur de marbre	Sébastien Bonnace	Stéphane Kurc	TV movie
1989	Embrasse-moi	Pierre	Michèle Rosier	
1989	Thank You Satan	Alain Monnier	André Farwagi	
1989	Les cigognes n'en font qu'à leur tête	Jérémie	Didier Kaminka	
1990	L'Autrichienne	Herman	Pierre Granier-Deferre	
1990	Le sixième doigt	Simon	Henri Duparc	
1990	Promotion canapé	André	Didier Kaminka	
1990	Feu sur le candidat	Jean-Marcel Mazzetti	Agnès Delarive	
1990	There Were Days... and Moons	The doctor	Claude Lelouch	
1990	Sentiments	Vincent	François Luciani	TV series (1 episode)
1991	Triplex	Nicolas Montgerbier	Georges Lautner	
1991	La pagaille	Jean-Jacques	Pascal Thomas	
1991	Netchaïev est de retour	Leloy	Jacques Deray	
1992	La Belle Histoire	Pierre Lhermitte	Claude Lelouch	
1992	Tous mes maris	Philippe Simonin	André Farwagi	TV movie
1993	Coup de jeune	Lohman	Xavier Gélin	
1993	Drôles d'oiseaux	Inspector Voitot	Peter Kassovitz	
1993	Pas d'amour sans amour !	Michel	Evelyne Dress	
1993	Regarde-moi quand je te quitte	Pierre	Philippe de Broca	TV movie
1994	Aux petits bonheurs	Bertrand	Michel Deville	
1994	Le misanthrope	Oronte	Mathias Ledoux	TV movie
1994	Assedicquement vôtre	Jean-Baptiste Corot	Maurice Frydland	TV movie
1994–1997	La mondaine	Anders Etchegoyen	Maurice Frydland, Marco Pico, ...	TV series (5 episodes)
1995	Du silence plein la tête	Jean	Patty Villiers	Short
1996	Tatort	Anders Etchegoyen	Klaus Biedermann	TV series (1 episode)
1996	Regards d'enfance	The father	Fabrice Cazeneuve	TV series (1 episode)
1997	After Sex	Philippe Clovier	Brigitte Roüan	Festival International du Film Francophone de Namur - Best Actor
1997	Paroles d'hommes	Fabien	Philippe Le Dem	
1997	Le censeur du lycée d'Epinal	Julien Dessales	Marc Rivière	TV movie
1997	L'histoire du samedi	Jean-Louis	Christiane Spiero	TV series (1 episode)
1999	Kennedy et moi	Paul Gurney	Sam Karmann	
1999	L'homme de ma vie	Charles	Stéphane Kurc	
1999	Children of the Century	Gustave Planche	Diane Kurys	
2000	Les redoutables	Marc	Georges Lautner	TV series (1 episode)
2001	Te quiero	Franck	Manuel Poirier	
2001	Jeu de cons	Inspector Aguerre	Jean-Michel Verner	
2001	Charmant garçon	Octave	Patrick Chesnais	Also writer
2002	Irène	Gazet	Ivan Calbérac	
2002	Mille millièmes	Gérard	Rémi Waterhouse	
2002	Sexes très opposés	Fernand	Éric Assous	
2002	Le pont de l'aigle	Jérôme Faure	Bertrand Van Effenterre	TV movie
2003	Le ventre de Juliette	Abel	Martin Provost	
2004	Mariage mixte	Jean-Yves Dupreux	Alexandre Arcady	
2004	Casablanca Driver	Coll Murray	Maurice Barthélemy	
2004	Bien agités !	Lieutenant Lescaro	Patrick Chesnais	TV movie
2004	L'un contre l'autre	Rémi	Dominique Baron	TV movie
2004	Vous êtes de la région ?	Mallochet	Lionel Epp	TV movie
2005	Not Here to Be Loved	Jean-Claude Delsart	Stéphane Brizé	Nominated - César Award for Best Actor; Nominated - European Film Award for Best Actor
2005	J'irai cracher sur vos tongs	Lola's father	Michel Toesca	
2005	Tu vas rire, mais je te quitte	Norbert	Philippe Harel	
2005	Les mésaventures d'un homme en colère	Don Quichotte	Jacques Deschamps	TV movie
2006	On va s'aimer	The inspector	Ivan Calbérac	
2006	J'invente rien	Armand	Michel Leclerc	
2006	Mon dernier rôle	Himself	Olivier Ayache-Vidal	Short
2006	Le Grand Charles	General Henri Giraud	Bernard Stora	TV Mini-Series
2007	Héros	Clovis Costa	Bruno Merle	
2007	The Price to Pay	Grégoire	Alexandra Leclère	
2007	The Diving Bell and the Butterfly	Doctor Lepage	Julian Schnabel	
2008	Melodrama Habibi	Bruno Caprice	Hany Tamba	
2008	Home Sweet Home	Gédéon	Didier Le Pêcheur	
2008	The Maiden and the Wolves	Léon Amblard	Gilles Legrand	
2009	Change of Plans	Erwann	Danièle Thompson	
2009	Quelque chose à te dire	Henry Celliers	Cécile Telerman	
2009	Climax	Gérard	Frédéric Sojcher	Short
2009	Duel en ville	Philippe Dellas	Pascal Chaumeil	TV movie
2009	Kaamelott	Lucius Sillius Sallustrius	Alexandre Astier	TV series (7 episodes)
2010	600 kilos d'or pur	Georges	Éric Besnard	
2010	HH, Hitler à Hollywood	Himself	Frédéric Sojcher	
2010	Toutes les filles pleurent	Bob	Judith Godrèche	
2010	Vieilles canailles	Martin	Arnaud Sélignac	TV movie
2010	Je vous ai compris: De Gaulle 1958-1962	Charles de Gaulle	Serge Moati	TV movie
2011	Fils unique	Théo	Miel Van Hoogenbemt	
2011	You Will Be My Son	François Amelot	Gilles Legrand	
2011	Hiver rouge	Inspector Rousseau	Xavier Durringer	TV movie
2011	Le grand restaurant II	The prostitute client	Gérard Pullicino	TV movie
2011	Chez Maupassant	Ernest Dufour	Jean-Daniel Verhaeghe	TV series (1 episode)
2012	Bienvenue parmi nous	Taillandier	Jean Becker	
2013	La braconne	Danny	Samuel Rondière	
2013	12 ans d'âge	Pierrot	Frédéric Proust	
2013	Bright Days Ahead	Philippe	Marion Vernoux	Nominated - César Award for Best Supporting Actor
2013	Bleu catacombes	Inspector Rousseau	Charlotte Brändström	TV movie
2014	La liste de mes envies	Jocelyne's father	Didier Le Pêcheur	
2014	Planter les choux	André	Karine Blanc	Short
2014	Où es-tu maintenant ?	Commandant Brodsky	Arnaud Sélignac	TV movie
2014	Marjorie	Jean	Ivan Calbérac	TV series (1 episode)
2015	The Roommates Party	The eccentric neighbor	Alexandra Leclère	
2015	Jaune Iris	Inspector Rousseau	Didier Bivel	TV movie
2015	No Limit	Claude	Ludovic Colbeau-Justin	TV series (8 episodes)
2016	Juillet août	Michel Lanoy	Diastème	
2016	Celui qu'on attendait	Bolzec	Serge Avedikian	
2017	Les ex	Didier	Maurice Barthélémy	
2017	Moi et le Che	Go	Patrice Gautier	
2017	Noir enigma	Inspector Rousseau	Manuel Boursinhac	TV movie
2018	Demi soeurs	The notary	Saphia Azzeddine & François-Régis Jeanne	
2018	L'école est finie	Gilbert	Anne Depétrini	
2018	Ma mère est folle	Alvaro	Diane Kurys	
2018	L'Empereur de Paris	Henry	Jean-François Richet	
2018	Insoupçonnable	Damien Moreau	Frédéric Garson & Christophe Lamotte	TV series (4 episodes)
2019	Mon bébé	Jules	Lisa Azuelos	
2019	Damien veut changer le monde	Vigo Mallet	Xavier de Choudens	

== Decorations ==
- Commander of the Order of Arts and Letters (2015)
