= Michel Berto =

French actor

- Born: 25 December 1939; Grenoble
- Died: 2 January 1996 (aged 56); Paris
- Occupation: Actor
- Spouses: Juliet Berto; Marie Berto

Michel Berto (French: [bɛʁto]; 25 December 1939 in Grenoble – 2 January 1996 in Paris) was a French actor. He was married to the actresses Juliet Berto and Marie Berto. His body was found on 3 January 1996, hence the exact date of his death is uncertain.

== Partial filmography ==
- 1971: Out 1 : Noli me tangere (directed by Jacques Rivette) - Gay friend Honey Moon
- 1973: Défense de savoir (directed by Nadine Trintignant)
- 1974: Erica Minor (directed by Bertrand Van Effenterre) - L'homme au discours entre les dents
- 1975: Zig zig (directed by László Szabó) - Un agent de police
- 1975: Le Jeu avec le feu (directed by Alain Robbe-Grillet) - L'adjoint du commissaire
- 1975: Que la fête commence (directed by Bertrand Tavernier) - L'abbé de Louis XV
- 1976: Moi, Pierre Rivière, ayant égorgé ma mère, ma sœur et mon frère... (directed by René Allio) - Maître Bertauld
- 1977: Des enfants gâtés (directed by Bertrand Tavernier)
- 1977: La Septième Compagnie au clair de lune (directed by Robert Lamoureux)
- 1978: L'Argent des autres (directed by Christian de Chalonge) - Duval
- 1978: En l'autre bord (directed by Jérôme Kanapa) - Un malade
- 1979: Mais où est donc Ornicar ? (directed by Bertrand Van Effenterre) - Le contrôleur financier
- 1979: Roberte (directed by Pierre Zucca) - Justin
- 1979: Ils sont grands ces petits (directed by Joël Santoni) - Le prisonnier
- 1979: La Mémoire courte (directed by Eduardo de Gregorio)
- 1979: Le Mors aux dents (directed by Laurent Heynemann) - Solo
- 1979: La Dérobade (directed by Daniel Duval)
- 1979: Bobo Jacco (directed by Walter Bal) - Chef de service
- 1979: The Police War (directed by Robin Davis)
- 1980: C'est encore loin l'Amérique (directed by Roger Coggio) - François
- 1980: La Provinciale (directed by Claude Goretta)
- 1981: Malevil (directed by Christian de Chalonge) - Bébé (uncredited)
- 1981: Neige (directed by Juliet Berto and Jean-Henri Roger) - L'aveugle
- 1981: Beau-père (directed by Bertrand Blier) - Le professeur
- 1981: Merry Go Round (directed by Jacques Rivette) - Jérôme
- 1982: Julien Fontanes, magistrat (TV Series, directed by François Dupont-Midi) - Fedry, croupier
- 1982: Qu'est-ce qu'on attend pour être heureux ! (directed by Coline Serreau) - Monsieur tout le monde
- 1983: Vive la sociale ! (directed by Gérard Mordillat)
- 1983: Le Bon Plaisir (directed by Francis Girod)
- 1985: Blessure (directed by Michel Gérard) - Le patron de la salle de rock
- 1985: Le Mariage du siècle (directed by Philippe Galland) - Un joueur de poker
- 1985: Kubyre (Short, directed by Pierre Henry Salfati)
- 1986: États d'âme (directed by Jacques Fansten) - Un fonctionnaire
- 1986: La Femme secrète (directed by Sébastien Grall) - Torti
- 1986: Les Fugitifs (directed by Francis Veber)
- 1987: L'Œil au beur(re) noir (directed by Serge Meynard) - Picard, le voisin
- 1990: Dédé (directed by Jean-Louis Benoît) - Louis
- 1991: Merci la vie (directed by Bertrand Blier) - Banker
- 1991: Aujourd'hui peut-être... (directed by Jean-Louis Bertucelli) - Bruno
- 1992: Les Enfants du naufrageur (directed by Jérôme Foulon) - Le curé
- 1992: À demain (directed by Didier Martiny)
- 1993: Jeanne la Pucelle (directed by Jacques Rivette) - Guillaume Erard
- 1995: Les Trois frères (directed by Didier Bourdon and Bernard Campan) - Le greffier
