= Bernadette Lafont =

French actress

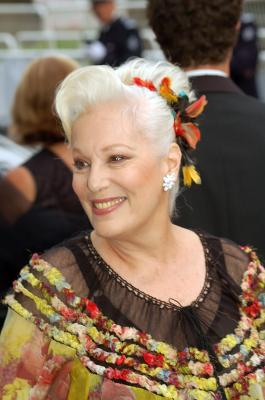
- Lafont in 2007
- Born: 28 October 1938; Nîmes, France
- Died: 25 July 2013 (aged 74); Nîmes, France
- Years active: 1957–2013
- Spouse(s): Gérard Blain (1957–1959); Diourka Medveczky (1959–1973)
- Children: 3, including Pauline Lafont
- Awards: Honorary César (2003)

Bernadette Lafont (French pronunciation: [bɛʁnadɛt lafɔ̃]; 28 October 1938 – 25 July 2013) was a French actress who appeared in more than 120 feature films. She has been considered "the face of French New Wave". In 1999 she told The New York Times her work was "the motor of my existence".

== Career ==
Bernadette Lafont had her debut in Les Mistons ("The Mischief Makers") in 1958 and became part of the Nouvelle Vague in the 1960s because of her films with François Truffaut and Claude Chabrol. In 1986 Lafont was awarded a César Award for Best Actress in a Supporting Role for An Impudent Girl (L'Effrontée). In the following year, she was again nominated, this time for Masques. For her long service to the French motion picture industry, she was awarded an Honorary César in 2003 . In May 2007, she chaired the jury for the fifth edition of the Award for Education presented at the 60th Cannes Film Festival. She was made an Officer of the Legion of Honor on 14 July 2009.

Her complete filmography includes TV shows, and she also worked successfully as a stage actress.

Her last film Paulette, released in 2013, was a success in and outside France.

== Personal life ==
Lafont had three children with her husband Diourka Medveczky: David, Elisabeth and Pauline (1963–1988).

In 1971, Lafont signed the Manifesto of the 343, which publicly announced she had an illegal abortion.

== Honors and awards ==
- Officier of the Order of Legion of Honour
- Officier of the Ordre National du Mérite
- Commandeur of the Ordre des Arts et des Lettres

== Death ==
Lafont died from complications of heart failure following heart attack on 25 July 2013 in Nîmes, France at the age of 74. Her body was cremated and her ashes were given to her family.

== Selected filmography ==
| Year | Title | Role | Director |
|---|---|---|---|
| 1958 | Les Mistons | Bernadette Jouve | François Truffaut |
| 1958 | Le Beau Serge | Marie | Claude Chabrol |
| 1958 | La Tour, prends garde ! | Uncredited | Georges Lampin |
| 1959 | Web of Passion | Julie, the waitress | Claude Chabrol |
| 1960 | L'Eau à la bouche | Prudence | Jacques Doniol-Valcroze |
| 1960 | Les Bonnes Femmes | Jane | Claude Chabrol |
| 1961 | Wise Guys | Ambroisine | Claude Chabrol |
| 1962 | Un clair de lune à Maubeuge | Charlotte | Jean Chérasse |
| 1965 | The Sleeping Car Murders | Georgette's sister | Constantin Costa-Gavras |
| 1965 | How to Keep the Red Lamp Burning | Sophie | Georges Lautner |
| 1965 | Pleins feux sur Stanislas | Rosine Lenoble | Jean-Charles Dudrumet |
| 1967 | Lamiel | Pauline | Jean Aurel |
| 1967 | The Thief of Paris | Marguerite, the waitress | Louis Malle |
| 1968 | Le Révélateur | the mother | Philippe Garrel |
| 1968 | The Lost Generation | Marie | András Kovács |
| 1969 | La Fiancée du pirate | Marie | Nelly Kaplan |
| 1970 | Elise, or Real Life | Anna | Michel Drach |
| 1971 | To Catch a Spy | Simone | Dick Clement |
| 1971 | Out 1 | Sarah | Jacques Rivette and Suzanne Schiffman |
| 1972 | Such a Gorgeous Kid Like Me | Camille Bliss | François Truffaut |
| 1972 | Trop jolies pour être honnêtes | Bernadette | Richard Balducci |
| 1973 | The Mother and the Whore | Marie | Jean Eustache |
| 1973 | The Edifying and Joyous Story of Colinot | Rosemonde | Nina Companeez |
| 1975 | A Happy Divorce | Jacqueline, the nurse | Henning Carlsen |
| 1975 | Zig Zag | Pauline | László Szabó |
| 1976 | Noroît | Giulia | Jacques Rivette |
| 1978 | Violette Nozière | Violetta's cellmate | Claude Chabrol |
| 1978 | Surprise Sock | Bernadette | Jean-François Davy |
| 1978 | La tortue sur le dos | Camille | Luc Béraud |
| 1979 | Il ladrone | Appula | Pasquale Festa Campanile |
| 1979 | La Gueule de l'autre | Gisèle Brossard | Pierre Tchernia |
| 1983 | Cap Canaille | Mireille Kebadjan | Juliet Berto and Jean-Henri Roger |
| 1983 | A Good Little Devil | Betty | Jean-Claude Brialy |
| 1984 | Canicule | Ségolène | Yves Boisset |
| 1984 | The Perils of Gwendoline in the Land of the Yik-Yak | the Queen | Just Jaeckin |
| 1985 | An Impudent Girl | Léone | Claude Miller |
| 1986 | Inspecteur Lavardin | Hélène Mons | Claude Chabrol |
| 1987 | Waiting for the Moon | Fernande Olivier | Jill Godmilow |
| 1987 | Masques | the masseuse | Claude Chabrol |
| 1988 | Une nuit à l'Assemblée Nationale | Madame Dugland | Jean-Pierre Mocky |
| 1991 | Dingo | Angie Cross | Rolf de Heer |
| 1996 | Le Fils de Gascogne | herself | Pascal Aubier |
| 1997 | Genealogies of a Crime | Esther | Raoul Ruiz |
| 2006 | Prête-moi ta main | Geneviève Costa | Éric Lartigau |
| 2007 | Les Petites vacances | Danièle | Olivier Peyon |
| 2007 | Broken English | Madame Grenelle | Zoe Cassavetes |
| 2007 | Nos 18 ans | Adèle | Frédéric Berthe |
| 2008 | 48 heures par jour | Mélina | Catherine Castel |
| 2012 | Paulette | Paulette | Jérôme Enrico |
| 2013 | Attila Marcel | Aunt Annie | Sylvain Chomet |
