= Danièle Gégauff =

French actress and line producer

Danièle Gégauff (née Rosencranz; 1939–2007) was a French actress and line producer. She was married to the French screenwriter Paul Gégauff. Danièle Gégauff also worked with executive producer Stéphane Tchalgadjieff.

She played Esther in Claude Chabrol's movie Une partie de plaisir, in which her onscreen husband was portrayed by her real-life husband Paul.

== Filmography ==
=== Actress ===
- Merry-Go-Round of Jacques Rivette (1981).
- Une Femme au bout de la nuit of Daniel Daërt (1980).
- Les Enfants du placard of Benoît Jacquot (1977).
- Une partie de plaisir of Claude Chabrol (1975).

=== Line producer ===
- Eros of Michelangelo Antonioni / Steven Soderbergh / Wong Kar-Wai (segment "The Dangerous Thread of Things") (as Danielle Rosencranz) (2004).
- Le Chien, le Général et les Oiseaux of Francis Nielsen (2003).
- Al di là delle nuvole of Michelangelo Antonioni / Wim Wenders (as Danielle Gégauff Rosencranz) (1995).
- Aïda of Pierre Jourdan (1977).
- Baxter, Vera Baxter of Marguerite Duras (as Danielle Gégauff) (1977).
- Out 1, noli me tangere of Jacques Rivette (as Danielle Gégauff) (1971).
