= Jean-Yves Escoffier =

French cinematographer

- Born: 12 July 1950; Lyon, France
- Died: 1 April 2003 (aged 52); Los Angeles, California, U.S.
- Occupation: Cinematographer

Jean-Yves Escoffier (12 July 1950 – 1 April 2003) was a French cinematographer. For his work on films by Leos Carax, Escoffier received the European Film Award for Best Cinematographer and was nominated for the César Award for Best Cinematography.

== Career ==
Escoffier worked as director of photography on a number of films of Leos Carax including Boy Meets Girl, Mauvais sang, and Les Amants du Pont-Neuf, on a number of European and American feature films including The Human Stain, Possession, Nurse Betty, Cradle Will Rock, Rounders, and Good Will Hunting, as well as Harmony Korine's Gummo.

He also worked with Mehdi Norowzian, Jeanne Moreau for Air France, David Lynch for Nissan Motors, and on music videos, "Hurt" (2002) for Johnny Cash and Mark Romanek.

On 1 April 2003, Escoffier died from a heart attack in his home in Los Angeles, California during post-production of The Human Stain, a film since dedicated to his memory.

== Filmography ==
=== As cinematographer ===
==== Film ====
Year	Title	Director	Notes	Ref(s)
1973	L'amour c'est du papier	Michel Leeb	Short film	
1977	The Sand Castle	Co Hoedeman	Short film	
1978	Passe montagne	Jean-François Stévenin		
1980	Simone Barbès ou la vertu	Marie-Claude Treilhou		
1981	Lourdes l'hiver	Marie-Claude Treilhou	Short film	
1982	La fonte de Barlaeus	Pierre-Henry Salfati	Short film	
1983	Archipel des amours	Marie-Claude Treilhou	Segment: "Lourdes, l'hiver"	
1983	Ulysse	Agnès Varda	Short film	
1983	Ballade à blanc	Bertrand Gauthier		
1983	Les Yeux des oiseaux	Gabriel Auer		
1983	Habibi	Françoise Prenant	Short film	
1983	Coup de feu	Magali Clément	Short film	
1984	Boy Meets Girl	Leos Carax		
1985	Une fille nommée banlieue	Georges Senechal	Documentary short film	
1985	Trois Hommes et un couffin	Coline Serreau		
1986	Mauvais sang	Leos Carax	Nominated—César Award for Best Cinematography	
1988	Jaune revolver	Olivier Langlois		
1991	Les Amants du Pont-Neuf	Leos Carax	European Film Award for Best Cinematographer	
1993	Charlie and the Doctor	Ralph C. Parsons		
1993	Dream Lover	Nicholas Kazan		
1994	Witch Hunt	Paul Schrader	TV movie	
1995	A Personal Journey with Martin Scorsese Through American Movies	Martin Scorsese, Michael Henry Wilson	TV documentary	
1995	Jack & Sarah	Tim Sullivan		
1996	The Crow: City of Angels	Tim Pope		
1996	Grace of My Heart	Allison Anders		
1997	Gummo	Harmony Korine		
1997	Excess Baggage	Marco Brambilla		
1997	Good Will Hunting	Gus Van Sant		
1998	Rounders	John Dahl		
1999	The Cradle Will Rock	Tim Robbins		
1999	Agujetas cantaor	Dominique Abel	Documentary	
2000	Nurse Betty	Neil LaBute		
2001	15 Minutes	John Herzfeld		
2002	Possession	Neil LaBute		
2002	No claudicar	Dominique Abel	Documentary short	
2003	Poligono Sur/Seville, Southside	Dominique Abel	Documentary	
2003	The Human Stain	Robert Benton	Dedicated to Escoffier	
2004	Cinévardaphoto	Agnès Varda	Documentary; Segment: "Ulysse"	

==== Music videos ====
Year	Title	Artist(s)	Director	Notes	Ref(s)
1996	"Love Don't Live Here Anymore"	Madonna	Jean-Baptiste Mondino		
2002	"Cochise"	Audioslave	Mark Romanek		
2003	"Hurt"	Johnny Cash	Mark Romanek	MTV Video Music Award for Best Cinematography	

=== Other credits ===
Year	Title	Director	DoP	Role	Ref(s)
1973	La famille heureuse (Famille Gazul)	Patrice Leconte	Jean Gonnet	Camera operator	
1975	C'est dur pour tout le monde	Christian Gion	Lionel Legros	Second assistant camera	
1975	Hu-Man	Jérôme Laperrousaz	Jimmy Glasberg	Assistant camera	
1976	Lumière	Jeanne Moreau	Ricardo Aronovich	Second assistant camera	
1978	Heroes Are Not Wet Behind the Ears	Charles Nemes	Étienne Fauduet	Assistant camera	
1978	The Pawn	Christian Gion	Lionel Legros	Camera operator	
1978	Passe montagne	Jean-François Stévenin	Jean-Yves Escoffier; Lionel Legros	Camera operator	
1980	Third World	Jérôme Laperrousaz	Étienne Fauduet	Assistant camera: additional live concert crew Le Palace, Paris: assisted by	
1983	Gramps Is in the Resistance	Jean-Marie Poiré	Robert Alazraki	Camera operator: Second unit	
1985	Shoah	Claude Lanzmann	Dominique Chapuis; Jimmy Glasberg; Phil Gries; William Lubtchansky	Assistant camera	
1995	A Personal Journey with Martin Scorsese Through American Movies	Martin Scorsese, Michael Henry Wilson	Jean-Yves Escoffier; Frances Reid; Nancy Schreiber	Camera operator	
2002	One Hour Photo	Mark Romanek	Jeff Cronenweth	Photographer: additional inserts	

== Sources ==
- Ballinger, Alexander (2004). New Cinematographers (annotated ed.). Harper Design. pp. 38–67. ISBN 1856693341. See also this book URL
