= Julie Jézéquel =

French actress and writer (born 1964)

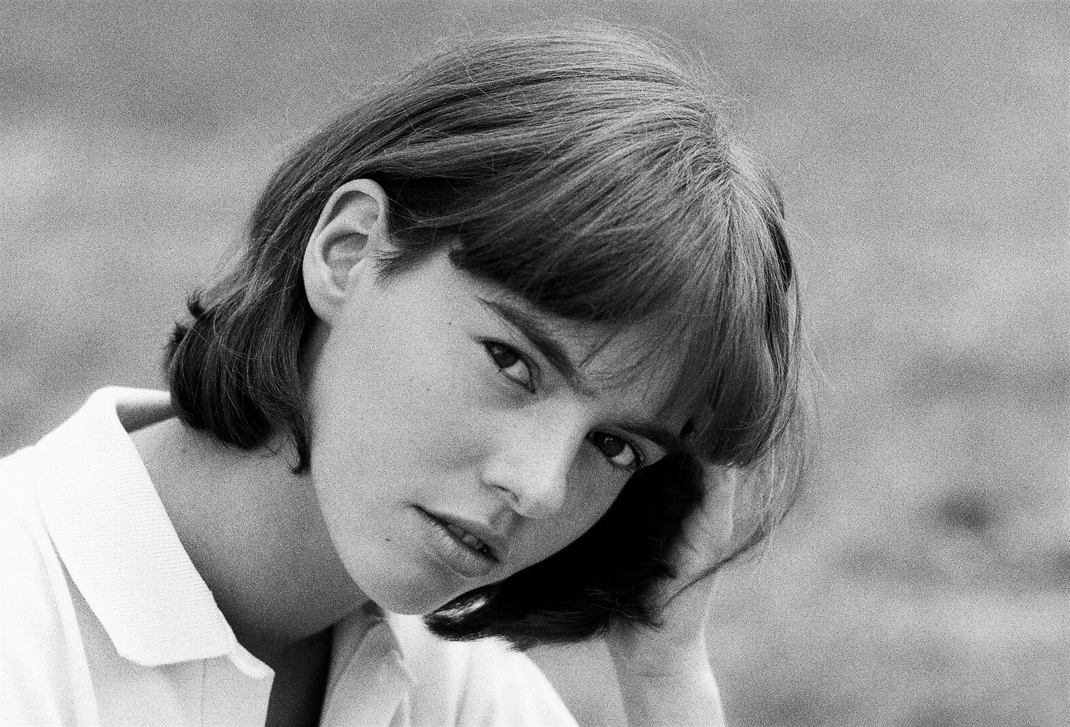
- Julie Jézéquel (1980)
- Born: 26 March 1964 (age 62); Boulogne-Billancourt, France
- Occupations: Actress; Writer
- Years active: 1979–present

Julie Jézéquel (born 26 March 1964) is a French actress and writer.

== Filmography ==
=== Actress ===
Year	Title	Role	Director	Notes
1979	Cop or Hood	Charlotte	Georges Lautner	
1980	Le coeur à l'envers		Franck Apprederis	
1981	Cinéma 16	Olivia	Bernard Dumont	TV series (1 episode)
1982	L'Étoile du Nord	Antoinette Baron	Pierre Granier-Deferre	Nominated - César Award for Most Promising Actress
1982	L'arbre	Judy	Jacques Doillon	TV movie
1983	Le bâtard	Marie	Bertrand Van Effenterre	
1984	Côté coeur, côté jardin	Claude	Bertrand Van Effenterre (2)	
1985	Code Name: Emerald	Jasmine	Jonathan Sanger	
1985	Le meilleur de la vie	Solange	Renaud Victor	
1985	On ne meurt que deux fois	Sophie	Jacques Deray	
1985	Pauline-épaulettes		Stéphanie de Mareuil	Short
1986	Suivez mon regard	A client	Jean Curtelin	
1987	Tandem	The waitress	Patrice Leconte	
1987	L'oeil au beur(re) noir	Virginie	Serge Meynard	
1987	Coeurs croisés	Tina	Stéphanie de Mareuil (2)	
1988	Sueurs froides	Thérèse	Patrice Leconte (2)	TV series (1 episode)
1988	La belle Anglaise	Dominique	Jacques Besnard	TV series (1 episode)
1989	Coupe-franche	Marie	Jean-Pierre Sauné	
1989	Cher frangin	Lou	Gérard Mordillat	
1989	Cinéma 16	Rose	Jean Larriaga	TV series (1 episode)
1989	Imogène	Cécile	François Leterrier	TV series (1 episode)
1990	Tumultes	Anne	Bertrand Van Effenterre (3)	Festival International du Film Francophone de Namur - Best Actress
1991	Un homme et deux femmes	Agnès	Valérie Stroh	
1991	Toujours seuls	Julie	Gérard Mordillat (2)	
1991	L'enveloppe	Ariane	Yves Lafaye	TV movie
1991	Cavale	Anne	Serge Meynard (2)	TV movie
1992	The Shadow	Anne-Marie	Claude Goretta	
1993	My Life and Times with Antonin Artaud	Jany	Gérard Mordillat (3)	
1993	Maigret	Monique	Étienne Périer	TV series (1 episode)
1994	La guerre des privés	Nadia	Josée Dayan & Jean-Pierre Prévost	TV series (3 episodes)
1996	La rançon du chien	The commissioner	Peter Kassovitz	TV movie
1997	Joséphine, ange gardien	Chantal	Dominique Baron	TV series (1 episode)
1998	Les amis de Ninon	Marie	Rosette	Short
1998	Deux mamans pour Noël	Véronique	Paul Gueu	TV movie
1998	Une semaine au salon	Liliane	Dominique Baron (2)	TV movie
1999	Paddy	Rose	Gérard Mordillat (4)	
1999	La vie d'un autre	Mathilde	Patrice Martineau	TV movie
2000	Deux frères	Nicole	Philippe Laïk	TV movie
2002	Les filles du calendrier	Catherine	Philippe Venault & Jean-Pierre Vergne	TV movie
2003	Simon le juste	Anna	Gérard Mordillat (5)	TV movie
2003	L'île atlantique		Gérard Mordillat (6)	TV movie
2004	Les filles du calendrier sur scène	Catherine	Jean-Pierre Vergne (2)	TV movie
2005	3 femmes... un soir d'été	Laurence	Sébastien Grall	TV mini-series
2006	Sois le meilleur	Cora	Christophe Barraud	TV movie
2006	Mariés... ou presque	Laurence	Didier Grousset	TV movie
2007	Un juge sous influence	Suzanne Chamollond	Jean Marboeuf	TV movie
2009	Reporters	Delassagne's assistant	Jean-Marc Brondolo	TV series (1 episode)

=== Writer ===
Year	Title	Director	Notes
1996	Le tuteur	Fabien Onteniente	TV movie
1997	L'histoire du samedi	Jean-Pierre Améris	TV series (1 episode)
1998	La femme du veuf	Michel Favart	TV movie
2000	Petite soeur	Patrick Poubel	TV movie
2001	Le parisien du village	Philippe Venault	TV movie
2002	Le voyage organisé	Alain Nahum	TV movie
2002	Les filles du calendrier	Jean-Pierre Vergne & Philippe Venault (2)	TV movie
2004	Les filles du calendrier sur scène	Jean-Pierre Vergne (2)	TV movie
2005	3 femmes... un soir d'été	Sébastien Grall	TV mini-series
2006	Mariés... ou presque	Didier Grousset	TV movie
2009	Sur le chemin de Compostelle	Didier Grousset (2)	TV movie
2011	La nuit du réveillon	Serge Meynard	TV movie
2013	Délit de fuite	Thierry Binisti	TV movie
2014	La Smala s'en mêle	Pascal Lahmani & Thierry Petit	TV series (2 episodes)
2016	Bébés Volés	Alain Berliner	TV movie

== Theater ==
Year	Title	Author	Director	Notes
1985	Les Nuits et les jours	Pierre Laville	Catherine Dasté & Daniel Berlioux	Théâtre 14 Jean-Marie Serreau
1986	Californie paradis des morts de faim	Sam Shepard	Marcel Maréchal	Théâtre La Criée

== Author ==
Year	Book	Publishing	Notes
2009	Retour à la ligne	Éditions de la Table ronde	Novel
