= Mais ou et donc Ornicar =

Mais ou est donc Ornicar
- Directed by: Bertrand Van Effenterre
- Written by: Bertrand Van Effenterre; Dominique Woldon
- Produced by: Herbert De Zaltza; Bertrand Van Effenterre
- Starring: Geraldine Chaplin; Brigitte Fossey
- Cinematography: Nurith Aviv
- Edited by: Joële Van Effenterre
- Music by: Antoine Duhamel
- Release date: 28 February 1979 (France)
- Running time: 110 minutes
- Country: France
- Language: French

Mais ou et donc Ornicar is a 1979 French drama film directed by Bertrand Van Effenterre. The film stars Geraldine Chaplin and Brigitte Fossey. It was released in France on 28 February, 1979.

== Plot ==
Isabelle (Chaplin) and Anne (Fossey) are two young women that are looking to strike out, find their own identities independent of men. They look for this fulfillment in their professional lives, as one directs a video production unit for sociological research and the other becomes a garage mechanic. However her success at the garage means she has little time to spend with her husband and child. Meanwhile the sociologist becomes disillusioned by the communication gap she senses in the workplace. Her mechanic friend continues to struggle with her work-life balance and comes to realise how important family is in her life.

== Cast ==
- Geraldine Chaplin as Isabelle
- Brigitte Fossey as Anne
- Jean-François Stévenin as Michel
- Didier Flamand as Philippe
- Jean-Jacques Biraud as Vincent
- Anna Prucnal as Agnès
