= Deadly Games (1989 film) =

1989 French Christmas action slasher film by René Manzor

- Film poster
- French: 3615 code Père Noël
- Directed by: René Manzor
- Written by: René Manzor
- Starring: Brigitte Fossey; Louis Ducreux; Patrick Floersheim; François-Éric Gendron; Stéphane Legros; Alain Lalanne
- Cinematography: Michel Gaffier
- Edited by: Christine Pansu
- Music by: Jean-Félix Lalanne
- Production companies: L.M. Productions; Deal; Garance
- Distributed by: Deal; UGC
- Release dates: March 18, 1989 (Laon Film Festival of Youth and Children's Films); January 17, 1990 (France)
- Running time: 92 minutes
- Country: France
- Language: French

3615 code Père Noël ([tʁɑ̃t.sis kɛ̃z kɔd pɛʁ nɔ.ɛl], "3615 code Father Christmas", referring to a Minitel dialing number; also known as Deadly Games, Dial Code Santa Claus, Game Over, and Hide and Freak) is a 1989 French Christmas action horror film written and directed by René Manzor. It is noted for its similarities to the 1990 American film Home Alone, the makers of which Manzor once threatened with legal action on the grounds of plagiarism, alleging they "remade my movie."

== Plot ==
Thomas de Frémont, a child prodigy obsessed with tinkering and action films, lives in a secluded and high-tech castle with his widowed mother, Julie, his diabetic and partially blind grandfather, Papy, and his pet dog, J.R. On Christmas Eve, Thomas uses the Minitel to try and communicate with Santa Claus and unknowingly makes contact with a derelict who is using a public Minitel terminal. The deranged man claims to be Santa and attempts to get Thomas to divulge his address; before their connection is severed, the vagrant learns Thomas's mother manages a nearby Printemps.

While Thomas sets up a security system to record or capture Santa, the vagabond gets a job as a Santa at the Printemps but is fired from it after Julie witnesses him slap a child who accused him of not being the real Santa. The vagrant subsequently steals a Santa suit, spray paints his hair and beard white and hitches a ride to Julie's home in the back of a delivery van, the driver of which he kills upon reaching the de Frémont residence. The man then murders Julie's groundskeeper and her chef, breaks into her home through the chimney, and stabs J.R. to death in front of Thomas, who is convinced the intruder is an enraged Santa. What follows is a game of cat and mouse as Thomas uses his security system and booby traps, as well as an arsenal of makeshift weaponry, to defend his enfeebled grandfather and combat the trespasser, who has cut the telephone lines and trashed the only car; the man at one point catches Thomas but then lets him go while declaring, "I win. You lose. Now I hide and you seek. Okay?"

Julie, concerned over her calls home not getting through, phones the police, who send an officer to the castle to check on Thomas and Papy. The vagrant murders the policeman and recaptures Thomas, but the boy is saved when his grandfather shoots his assailant with the dead officer's gun, with Julie arriving home seconds later to find a stunned Thomas standing over the killer's body, stammering, "It's my fault, Mom. I wanted to see Santa Claus."

== Cast ==
- Brigitte Fossey as Julie de Frémont
- Louis Ducreux as Papy
- Patrick Floersheim as Le Père Noël
- Alain Lalanne as Thomas de Frémont
- François-Éric Gendron as Roland
- Stéphane Legros as Pilou
- Franck Capillery as Le Policier
- Nicole Raucher as Louise
- Gédéon as Charles
- Charles de Feral as Cadre du Printemps
- Marion Bureau as Marion
- Mousse as Le Clown
- Edmond Thanel as Chauffeur-Livreur
- René Manzor as Responsible Stock

== Release ==
In 2018, the film had its North American premiere at the Fantastic Fest in Austin, Texas, after having been restored by American Genre Film Archive.

== Reception ==
René Manzor won Best Director and Best Film at the 1990 Fantafestival.

John Squires of Bloody Disgusting gave Deadly Games a glowingly positive review, heaping praise on its setting, cinematography, the relationships between its characters, and its sinister villain before concluding, "Deadly Games doesn't shy away from going to nightmarish places, but it's also got that holiday warmth you just love to see in Christmas movies." In a review written for Dread Central, Tyler Doupe opined that while the film was "far-fetched in almost every way imaginable" it was still "an awful lot of fun" and "the kind of movie that wants you to turn off your brain and enjoy." Angel Melanson of Fangoria was complimentary towards the film, writing, "if this isn't already in your top three holiday horror rotation, get on it" and further stating, "Paying homage to American action movies of the '80s, with clever gadgets, a truly horrifying killer Santa, and booby traps (pre-dating Christmas classic Home Alone), whatever your chosen title is for this one, it's a guaranteed good time."

The "crazy and out-there" film was awarded a score of 6/10 by Jason Adams of JoBlo.com, who commended its action set-pieces and its realistic child protagonist, writing, "Thomas may be a badass Rambo Jr. with some of the tricks up his sleeve, but the movie never lets you forget that he's also a child suffering real injuries and crying for his mom. It's a brutal but unique spin to this kind of horror flick, one that you can't believe the filmmakers actually went for." Peter Martin of ScreenAnarchy offered high praise to Deadly Games, writing, "I was utterly bowled over with happiness. Sure, it's your standard clever kid vs Santa Claus home invasion tale (?!), made before Home Alone, but it's exceptionally smart, funny and kinda fiendish too. It's a great family action movie for families who hate the holidays." Rafael Motamayor of Polygon commended the "slasher horror" film's "emotional stakes" and how it "fluctuates between whimsy children's humor and horror, using the kid-friendly first half to lure you into the horrors to come."

== See also ==
- Internet homicide
- List of films featuring home invasions
