= Stolen Holidays =

- Les Petites Vacances
- Directed by: Olivier Peyon
- Written by: Olivier Peyon, Cyril Brody & Gladys Marciano
- Starring: Bernadette Lafont
- Cinematography: Alexis Kavyrchine
- Edited by: Fabrice Rouaud
- Music by: Jérome Baur
- Distributed by: Pierre Grise Distribution
- Release dates: 12 October 2006 (Mill Valley Film Festival); 24 January 2007
- Running time: 90 minutes
- Country: France
- Language: French
- Box office: $120.000

Stolen Holidays (French: Les Petites Vacances) is a 2006 French drama film directed by Olivier Peyon.

== Plot ==
Danielle (Bernadette Lafont), a grandmother in her sixties, is planning to take her two grandchildren to their father’s house for the Easter vacation. Since retiring as a schoolteacher, Danielle has regularly taken on this responsibility after her daughter’s divorce. This time, however, the children’s father is not there to welcome them, giving Danielle the opportunity to spend a bit more time with her grandchildren and to take them out for the day.

Jumping at every opportunity presented to them, Danielle soon transforms this day-outing into an impromptu holiday. Only what starts out as a fun adventure gradually turns into an inexorable deconstructing experience, and it soon becomes impossible for Danielle to contemplate taking the kids back…

== Cast ==
- Bernadette Lafont as Danièle
- Adèle Csech as Marine
- Claude Brasseur as The stranger in the palace
- Lucas Franchi as Thomas
- Claire Nadeau as Nicole
- Éric Savin as Eric
