= Hermine Karagheuz =

French-Armenian actress (1938–2021)

- Հերմինե Ղարագյոզ
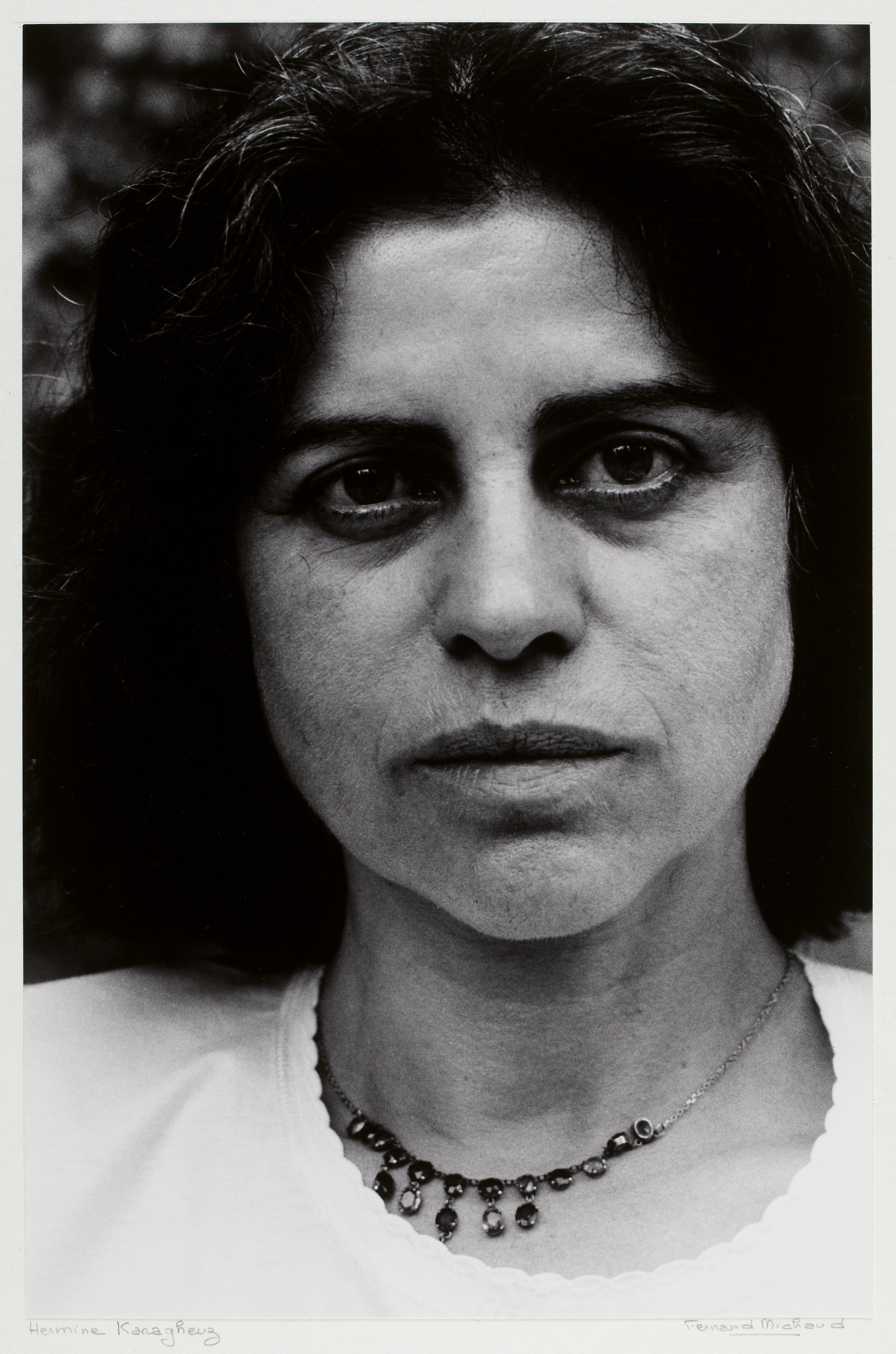
- Born: Hermine Marie Karagheozian; 2 December 1938; Paris, France
- Died: 30 April 2021 (aged 82); Paris, France
- Occupations: Actress; photographer; author
- Years active: 1966-2016

Hermine Marie Karagheuz (Armenian: Հերմինե Ղարագյոզ; 2 December 1938 – 30 April 2021) was a French-Armenian actress, writer and photographer.

== Early life ==
Karagheuz was born on 2 December 1938 in Paris, France. Her parents were originally from Armenia and were living in exile as a result of the Armenian genocide, which had made them both orphans. The Karagheuzes were an artistic family. Hermine Karagheuz grew up in Issy-les-Moulineaux and moved to Saint-Germain-des-Prés when she turned 18.

== Career ==
Karagheuz's acting career spanned across films, television, and stage. Her film debut was in Jacques Baratier's Le Désordre à vingt ans (1966). She appeared in many films by director Jacques Rivette, notably the thirteen-hour long Out 1 (1971), Duelle (1976), and Merry-Go-Round (1981), all of which concluded with a shot of Karagheuz. Among her notable TV roles was Éponine in the 1972 mini series adaptation of Les Misérables by Marcel Bluwal. On stage, she acted in some 30 productions between the mid-1970s and the early 2000s.

As a photographer, she had her works exhibited by agnès b. at the Galerie du Jour in Paris in 1996–1997. She contributed to the exhibition Mémoires arméniennes (English: Armenian Memories) at Parc de la Villette in 2006. In 2017, she provided narration for Georgina Starr's exhibition Moment Memory Monument at FRAC Franche-Comté.

== Personal life ==
Karagheuz's partner was the actor and director Roger Blin (1907–1984). She was the author of his biography, Roger Blin – Une dette d’amour (English: A debt of love), first published in 2002 and reprinted in 2021.

Karagheuz died in Paris on 30 April 2021, aged 82.
