= François-Éric Gendron =

French actor (born 1954)

François-Éric Gendron (15 March 1954 in Fontainebleau, Seine-et-Marne) is a French actor. He is the son of French cellist Maurice Gendron. He is the main French voice actor of Sean Bean.

== Filmography ==
=== Film ===
- 1978: Violette Nozière - 1st Student
- 1979: Confidences pour confidences - Paul-Louis
- 1979: Le temps des vacances - Laurent
- 1981: Une robe noire pour un tueur - Robert
- 1981: Les hommes préfèrent les grosses (directed by Jean-Marie Poiré) - Adrien
- 1983: Life Is a Bed of Roses
- 1985: Désir (Desire) (directed by Jean-Paul Scarpitta)
- 1985: Eternal Fire - Henry Robillot
- 1985: Le Quatrième Pouvoir - Remy Marie
- 1987: Cloud Waltzing (TV Movie, Yorkshire Television, directed by Gordon Flemyng) - François De Paul
- 1987: L'Ami de mon amie (directed by Eric Rohmer) - Alexandre
- 1988: Sotto il vestito niente II - David
- 1989: 3615 code Père Noël (directed by René Manzor) - Roland
- 1989: A deux minutes près (directed by Eric Le Hung) - Paul
- 1989: La Révolution française ('The French Revolution') (directed by Robert Enrico and Richard T. Heffron) - Barere (segment "Années terribles, Les")
- 1989: I Want to go home (directed by Alain Resnais) - Lionel Cohn-Martin
- 1989: Lluvia de otoño
- 1990: Not a Penny More, Not a Penny Less (TV Movie, directed by Clive Donner) - Frank
- 1990: Dames Galantes (directed by Jean-Charles Tacchella) - Bussy d'Amboise
- 1991: Triplex (directed by Georges Lautner) - Frank
- 1996: Mi nombre es sombra - Dr. Octavio Beiral
- 1997: ¿De qué se ríen las mujeres? - Salva
- 1997: Momentos robados
- 1998: Em dic Sara - Adrián
- 2006: Du jour au lendemain - Laurent
- 2007: Si c'était lui... - Hubert
- 2010: Streamfield, les carnets noirs (directed by François Viallat) - François Viallat
- 2011: L'Attaque - Martin Luthard
- 2011: The Well-Digger's Daughter - Le capitaine
- 2012: Télé gaucho (directed by Michel Leclerc) - Le père de Victor
- 2017: Des amours, désamour - Edouard
- 2021: The Man in the Basement - Attorney Massard

=== Television ===
- 1980: Fortunata y Jacinta, TV series, TVE, based upon the novel by Benito Pérez Galdós
- 1992-1993: Dangerous Curves - Alexandre Dorleac
- 1998-2010: Avocats & associés (Advocates and Associates) - Robert Carvani
- 2004-2006: Le Proc - Mathieu Brenner
- 2014: Joséphine, ange gardien - Cassel
