= Brigitte Fossey =

French actress

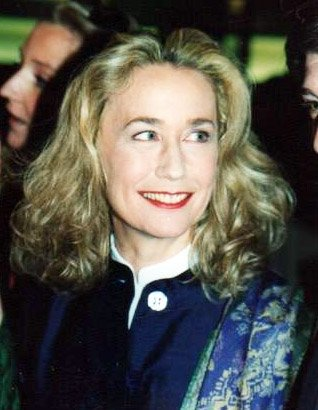
- Fossey in 1998
- Born: Brigitte Florence Fossey; 15 June 1946 (age 80); Tourcoing, Nord, Hauts-de-France, France
- Occupation: Actress
- Years active: 1952–present
- Spouse: Jean-François Adam (m. 1966; died 1980)
- Children: Marie Adam

Brigitte Florence Fossey (French pronunciation: [bʁiʒit flɔʁɑ̃s fɔsɛ]; born 15 June 1946) is a French actress.

== Early years ==
The daughter of a schoolteacher, Fossey was five years old when she was cast by director René Clément to star in his film, Forbidden Games. Fossey played the role of an innocent child orphaned by World War II. The film won numerous awards worldwide, including the Academy Award for Best Foreign Language Film, and Fossey was hired by American actor/director Gene Kelly for his 1957 film, The Happy Road. When Fossey was ten years old her parents took her out of the film business so she could receive proper schooling. While completing her education, Fossey studied piano and dance and then went on to work in Geneva, Switzerland as an interpreter/translator.

== Career ==
In 1967, at age twenty, after studying acting at Yves Furet "Studio d'Entrainement de l'Acteur" in Paris, Fossey was offered the female lead by director Jean-Gabriel Albicocco for his film Le Grand Meaulnes. As an adult Fossey acted both on stage and in film, working with French directors such as François Truffaut and Bertrand Blier. Fluent in English, Fossey has appeared in several Hollywood motion pictures, including a 1979 role as the wife of Paul Newman in the Robert Altman-directed film, Quintet. In 1982, she was a member of the jury at the 32nd Berlin International Film Festival. During the 1990s, she began performing in television productions.

== Personal life ==
Brigitte Fossey has a daughter from her marriage to director Jean-François Adam, whom she met while making his 1970 film M comme Mathieu.

== Awards and recognition ==
- 1977: Nominated for a César Award for Best Actress in a Supporting Role for Le bon et les méchants
- 1978: Nominated for a César Award for Best Actress for Les Enfants du placard

== Selected filmography ==
Year	Title	Role	Notes
1952	Forbidden Games	Paulette	Academy Award for Best Foreign Language Film
1953	The Steel Rope	Marcella	
1956	The Happy Road	Jeanine	
1967	The Wanderer	Yvonne de Galais	
1968	Adieu l'ami	Dominique 'Waterloo' Austerlitz	
1970	Raphael, or The Debauched One	Bernardine	
1973	Going Places	the woman in the train	
1974	The Irony of Chance	Ursula	
1975	Calmos	Suzanne Dufour	
1976	The Good and the Bad	Dominique Blanchot	
1976	The Man Who Loved Women	Geneviève Bigey	
1977	Closet Children	Juliette	
1977	Le pays bleu	Louise Morand	
1978	The Glass Cell	Lisa Braun	Nominated - Academy Award for Best Foreign Language Film
1979	Mais où et donc Ornicar	Anne	
1979	Quintet	Vivia	
1980	La Boum	Françoise Beretton	
1980	Chanel Solitaire	Adrienne	
1982	La Boum 2	Françoise Beretton	
1982	Enigma	Karen Reinhardt	
1983	For Those I Loved	Dina Gray	
1988	Cinema Paradiso (extended Italian version only)	Elena Mendola (as adult)	Academy Award for Best Foreign Language Film
1989	Deadly Games	Julie de Frémont	
1990	The Last Butterfly	Vera	
1991	Les enfants du naufrageur	Hélène	
1992	Long Conversation with a Bird	Elisabeth Halbritter	
2016	Josephine, Guardian Angel	Gabrielle Chamant	TV series (1 episode)
2017	Don't Tell Her		
