= Out 1 =

1971 film by Jacques Rivette and Suzanne Schiffman

- 2015 French re-release poster
- Directed by: Jacques Rivette; Suzanne Schiffman
- Screenplay by: Jacques Rivette; Suzanne Schiffman
- Based on: History of the Thirteen by Honoré de Balzac
- Produced by: Stéphane Tchalgadjieff
- Starring: Jean-Pierre Léaud; Michael Lonsdale; Bernadette Lafont; Bulle Ogier; Françoise Fabian; Juliet Berto; Michèle Moretti; Éric Rohmer
- Cinematography: Pierre-William Glenn
- Edited by: Nicole Lubtchansky
- Music by: Jean-Pierre Drouet
- Distributed by: Sunshine Productions
- Release date: 9 October 1971
- Running time: 775 minutes
- Country: France
- Language: French

Out 1, also referred to as Out 1: Noli Me Tangere, is a 1971 French experimental mystery film written and directed by Jacques Rivette and Suzanne Schiffman. It is indebted to Honoré de Balzac's La Comédie humaine, particularly the History of the Thirteen collection (1833–35). Known for its length of nearly 13 hours, the film is divided into eight parts of approximately 90–100 minutes each.

The vast length of Out 1 allows Rivette and Schiffman, like Balzac, to construct multiple loosely connected characters with independent stories whose subplots weave amongst each other and continually uncover new characters with their own subplots. A truncated 4½-hour version exists, and its Spectre subtitle was chosen for the name's ambiguous and various indistinct meanings, while the Noli me tangere ("touch me not") subtitle for the original cut is a reference to it being the full-length film as intended by Rivette.

The film's experimentation with parallel subplots was influenced by André Cayatte's two-part Anatomy of a Marriage (1964), while the use of expansive screen time was first toyed with by Rivette in L'amour fou (1969). The parallel narrative structure has since been used in many other notable films, including Krzysztof Kieślowski's Dekalog and Lucas Belvaux's Trilogie, which includes Un couple épatant, Cavale and Après la vie, to name a few. Each part begins with a title in the form of "from person to person" (usually indicating the first and last characters seen in each episode), followed by a handful of black and white still photos recapitulating the scenes of the prior episode, then concluded by showing the final minute or so (in black and white) of the last episode before cutting into the new episode itself (which is entirely in color).

Out 1 has won consistent critical acclaim since its release, and further received 13 votes in the 2012 Sight & Sound critics' poll of the greatest films ever made, resulting in a final ranking of 127th, and 17 votes in the 2022 critics' poll, resulting in a final ranking of 169th.

== Title ==
Out 1 is known by many titles. Out 1: Noli Me Tangere, the frequently-cited longer title of the film, has its origins as a phrase written on the film canister of an early workprint. This longer title was commonly understood as the film's actual title until a finished print was made in 1989 for exhibition at the Rotterdam Film Festival and as a telecine transfer for TV broadcast. At that point Rivette asserted the title on-screen as simply Out 1.

When asked why the film is called Out 1, Rivette responded, "I chose 'Out' as the opposite of the vogue word 'in', which had caught on in France and which I thought was silly. The action of the film is rather like a serial which could continue through several episodes, so I gave it the number 'One'."

Out 1: Spectre is the proper title of the shorter, four-hour version, which is nonetheless a completely separate and distinctive work rather than simply a shortened form of the longer feature and includes scenes omitted from that version.

== Plot and themes ==
Rivette in the film focuses on theatrical rehearsals, a motif present in both L'amour fou and his debut feature Paris nous appartient (1960); he extends L'amour fou's relentless reportage-style examination of the development of a play (in that case Jean Racine's Andromaque) and its effects on the director and his wife. In the case of Out 1, its anchors are two theater groups, each rehearsing Aeschylus plays (Seven Against Thebes and Prometheus Bound); no character is made the lead. There are also two outsiders: Colin, who believes there may be a real-life Thirteen group, and Frédérique, a swindler who steals letters which may be the group's communications. Other characters include Emilie, who runs a hangout under the name Pauline and whose husband, Igor, has been missing.

The film initially alternates between documentary-style scenes observing rehearsals, Colin soliciting money from café patrons as a deaf man by playing irritating harmonica tunes, and Frédérique stealing money through deceptions. Colin receives three mysterious messages referencing "the Thirteen" and Lewis Carroll's The Hunting of the Snark. He connects this to Balzac and begins a quixotic quest to uncover their meaning and the Thirteen. Later, Frédérique interrupts Etienne, playing chess against himself at home; when she is left alone, she looks for a stash of money but instead steals letters. Sensing they refer to a secret society, she attempts to sell them to their correspondents for money or information, but fails. Only Emilie buys the letters, because they reference her husband.

The Seven Against Thebes production employs a newcomer, Renaud, to assist, but he quickly seizes creative direction from Lili, who recedes in disgust. Quentin wins a million francs betting, but during the ensemble's celebration, Renaud steals it; the production is cancelled, and the members search Paris for Renaud. Thomas brings in old friend Sarah to help with a creative block on Prometheus Bound, but she causes a rift and the play is abandoned when another player leaves for unrelated reasons. Thomas's block was due to the break-up of his longterm personal and professional relationship with Lili.

Thomas is revealed to be in the Thirteen, although the group was inactive and had agreed to become dormant. An encounter between Colin and Thomas motivates Thomas to suggest to Etienne reviving it, but Etienne is reluctant because of the group's inactivity. A correspondent, Pierre, discussed but not seen, is described as sinister and childlike. After reading the letters, Emilie prepares photocopies of them for newspapers and asserts a scandal involving Pierre setting up Igor. Since they are both Thirteen members, the group reconstitutes to prevent this, and Thomas, Etienne and ruthless lawyer de Graffe meet to discuss it.

Frédérique meets the man that her gay friend Honey Moon is infatuated with, who turns out to be Renaud; they marry in a blood ritual, but she suspects that he may be in another more sinister secret society and, after seeing him associate with a gang, draws a gun on him, but warns him – causing him to turn and shoot her dead.

Colin gives up on the Thirteen, while it is suggested by two other Thirteen members, Lucie de Graffe and cynical professor Warok, that Pierre wrote the messages to Colin and has been behind developments, because he misses the Thirteen and wants to restore it or replace it with young blood like Colin. Several characters retreat to Emilie's Normandy house, "the Obade" (another Balzacian reference, see "Ferragus"), where she breaks down in front of Sarah, confessing her love for both Colin (who had been courting her) and Igor. Her dilemma is solved when Igor phones to ask her to meet him in Paris. She and Lili set off to see him.

Thomas remains on the beach with two actors and has a drunken hysterical episode, when he pretends to collapse. They try to revive him but, when he reveals his jest, walk away in disgust and leave. Thomas is left, crying and laughing, stranded, and part of no group. The film then cuts to Marie, an actress from the Thebes group, still searching for Renaud and the money. A statue of a goddess, perhaps Athena, towers above her.

== Characters ==
- Achille (Sylvain Corthay): Actor in Prometheus Bound troupe. Accompanies Thomas and Rose to the Obade at the end of the film.
- Arsenal (Marcel Bozonnet): Actor in Seven Against Thebes troupe. Vaguely knew Renaud and introduced him to the rest of the group. Also known as Nicolas, Papa, or Theo.
- Balzac specialist (Éric Rohmer): Professor who Colin contacts (while still pretending to be a deaf man) to attempt to discover some further clues as to the possibility of the existence of the Thirteen in real life.
- Beatrice (Edwine Moatti): Actress in Prometheus Bound troupe. Is a confidant and possibly lover of Thomas. Engages in a threesome with Thomas and Sarah. Her relationship with the Ethnologist is broken off when he announces his intention to depart for the Basque region for work. This also causes her to leave the troupe.
- Bergamotte (Bernadette Onfroy): Actress in Prometheus Bound troupe.
- Colin (Jean-Pierre Léaud): Young outsider who pretends to be a deaf whilst playing a harmonica for money around Parisian cafes. Receives three messages from Pierre, which set him off to try to uncover a real-life "Thirteen" in the vein of the Balzac novels. Falls in love with Pauline after numerous meetings at her store. Makes many connections through his investigations, but ultimately fails to find any cooperative parties and abandons his belief in the Thirteen.
- Elaine (Karen Puig): Actress in Seven Against Thebes troupe. Alerts Lucie when Lili goes missing for several days (which turns out to be a trip with Emilie to the Obade).
- Emilie (Bulle Ogier): Member of the Thirteen. Name that Pauline goes by at home. With Lili she murders the courier and hides his body in the basement of the shop. Wife to Igor and mother of two children with him. His disappearance six months earlier causes her to buy Pierre's letters from Frédérique; these refer to the disappearance. Despite Sarah's admonitions, she plans to send photocopies of the letters to newspapers in order to discover what is going on; however, Iris winds up burning them behind her back. Leaves for Obade, where she confesses her love for Colin and Igor to Sarah. Igor calls her not long after and tells her to meet him in Paris. She leaves with Lili. See Pauline.
- The Ethnologist (Michel Delahaye): Romantic interest of Beatrice. Breaks up with her when he announces his departure to the Basque region for work. Beatrice leaves Prometheus Bound shortly afterward because of this.
- Etienne (Jacques Doniol-Valcroze): Member of the Thirteen. Frederique steals his letters during an attempted con and tries to sell them off for money and information about the group. Meets with Thomas to discuss the revival of the group and later with Thomas and Lucie to discuss how to control Emilie's potential contact with newspapers.
- Faune (Monique Clement): Actress in Prometheus Bound troupe.
- Frédérique (Juliet Berto): Young petty thief who deceives and exploits men only as long as she needs to get into their wallets. Her only friend and confidant is Honey Moon, a gay barfly played by Juliet Berto's real-life husband Michel Berto. She finds Etienne's letters while looking for his money and takes them instead. Starts calling the correspondents to sell them for money, but begins to try to make sense of the information referring to the Thirteen and also asks for information, particularly from Lucie. Meets Honey Moon's crush, who turns out to be Renaud, and has a blood wedding with him. After suspecting his involvement in a secret society, she follows him and causes him to shoot her dead before he realizes who she is.
- Georges (unseen): Member of the Thirteen. Lili's current boyfriend.
- Gian-Reto (Barbet Schroeder): Hanger-on at Pauline's store.
- Honey Moon (Michel Berto): Gay confidant of Frédérique who borrows money from her, incites her to disrupt black market pornographers. He is infatuated with Renaud, and this eventually leads to Frédérique seeking out Renaud.
- Igor (unseen): Emilie's husband and father of her two young children. Member of the Thirteen. Been missing since leaving for work six months ago. Discussed in Etienne's letters, some of which Emilie buys from Frédérique. At the film's end Emilie receives a phone call from Igor asking her to meet him in Paris at Warok's.
- Iris (Ode Bitton): Pregnant nanny of Emilie and Igor's children. Solves their problem by giving to Thomas Emilie's letters to the newspapers which would have revealed the Thirteen and scandalized Pierre.
- Lili (Michèle Moretti): Director of the Seven Against Thebes troupe, formerly involved with Thomas. May be involved with Quentin. Gradually recedes from the production as Renaud's influence expands. Accidentally takes a picture of Renaud which the troupe uses to try to get someone from the public to identify him. Member of the Thirteen.
- Lucie (Françoise Fabian): Lawyer with whom Lili renews contact after a long silence. Member of the Thirteen. Correspondent in some of Etienne's letters. Is contacted by Frédérique and meets her, but instead takes some of the letters from her.
- Marie (Hermine Karagheuz): Actress in the Seven Against Thebes troupe. Delivers one of Pierre's messages to Colin, which clearly seems to make her a member of the Thirteen. Last character seen in the film, standing next to a Paris monument.
- Marlon (Jean-François Stevenin): Thug with a criminal history who is an acquaintance of Frédérique. She encounters him in a bar, and he bizarrely beats her, but she pickpockets him during the beating.
- Max (Louis Julien): Quentin's son. Suggests the Seven Against Thebes troupe use Lili's photograph of Renaud to ask members of the public if they've seen him around.
- Nicolas (Marcel Bozonnet): Actor in Seven Against Thebes troupe. Vaguely knew Renaud and introduced him to the rest of the group. Also known as Arsenal, Papa, or Theo.
- Papa (Marcel Bozonnet): Actor in Seven Against Thebes troupe. Vaguely knew Renaud and introduced him to the rest of the group. Also known as Arsenal, Nicolas, or Theo.
- Pauline (Bulle Ogier): Name that Emilie goes by at her store where local youths hang out. Colin meets her there and soon falls in love with her. She abandons the shop to retreat to the Obade. See Emilie.
- Pierre (unseen): Member of the Thirteen. Author of letters to Colin. Correspondent in some of Etienne's letters who may be implicated in Igor's disappearance. Emilie threatens to send evidence of this to newspapers after she pays Frédérique for the letters.
- Quentin (Pierre Baillot): Actor in the Seven Against Thebes troupe. Father to Max. Wins a million francs in the lottery, which is promptly stolen during celebrations by Renaud. Attempts to find Renaud but fails, and joins Prometheus Bound troupe briefly afterwards.
- Renaud (Alain Libolt): Brought in by Arsenal/Nicolas/Papa/Theo to help the Seven Against Thebes troupe, but gradually starts to exert more and more influence on the production, to Lili's chagrin. Steals Quentin's million francs of lottery winnings during the troupe's celebration. Turns out to be Honey Moon's crush, which allows Frédérique to find him. She soon suspects that he may be a member of a secret society (though ultimately it seems more likely to be a local gang, and not the Thirteen). He shoots and kills her when she catches him off-guard.
- Rose (Christiane Corthay): Actress in Prometheus Bound troupe. Accompanies Thomas and Achille to the Obade and comforts him during some of his hysterical episodes at the end.
- Sarah (Bernadette Lafont): Writer living in Igor's Obade home. Thomas asks her to help him with the direction of Prometheus Bound, and later has a threesome with her and Beatrice. She clashes with the group, which is a factor in the abandonment of the play, along with Beatrice's departure, which is caused by personal factors. Member of the Thirteen, she doesn't trust Thomas and strenuously attempts (unsuccessfully) to intervene to prevent Emilie from sending Pierre's letters to the newspapers. Emilie later confides her love for Colin and Igor to her.
- Theo (Marcel Bozonnet): Actor in Seven Against Thebes troupe. Vaguely knew Renaud and introduced him to the rest of the group. Also known as Arsenal, Nicolas, or Papa.
- Thomas (Michael Lonsdale): Director of the Prometheus Bound troupe, formerly involved with Lili, and in ambiguously romantic relationships with both Beatrice and Sarah during the course of the film. Asks Sarah to help him direct the play. After a threesome with Sarah and Beatrice, abandons it because of Sarah's friction with the group and Beatrice's unrelated departure. Member of the Thirteen. Destroys Emilie's letters incriminating Pierre. Proposes to reunite with Lili, but is rejected by her, which leads to his final hysteria on the beach.
- Warok (Jean Bouise): Member of the Thirteen. Referred to in Etienne's letters. Both Frédérique and Colin ask him about the group, but he denies all knowledge.
- Miss Blandish (Brigitte Roüan)

== Style ==
After working with both 35mm film and 16mm film in L'amour fou, Rivette was comfortable enough with the 16mm format to work with it on Out 1, the massive length of which precluded any serious attempt to shoot the whole film on expensive 35mm. Despite the immense length of the final product, the film was shot under a tight shooting schedule of only six weeks. Rivette's preference for the long take was the main reason why such a schedule could be maintained. Because he wanted the performances to have a level of realism, some takes include lines "fluffed" by actors, or other common "mistakes" such as camera and boom microphone shadows, as well as unwitting extras looking at the camera in exterior shots (including a well-known scene where two young boys doggedly follow Jean-Pierre Léaud along the street during an extended monologue). Rivette has said that the intimacy of the performances in the face of such mistakes was precisely why he kept those takes in the film. Many of the rehearsal scenes, particularly those of the Prometheus Bound group, are composed almost entirely of long shots, although the film also contains more conventional editing elsewhere. The slow pacing of the film as a whole is also loosely based on Balzac, and its first few hours are constructed more like a prologue, where the editing is slower and the characters are no more than introduced. It is not until three or four hours into the film that characters' motives and the story lines begin to reveal themselves.

The work also includes stylistically adventurous techniques, including the shooting of long shots through mirrors (again developing from work in L'amour fou), shortcuts to black to punctuate otherwise continuous scenes, short cutaways to unrelated or seemingly meaningless shots, non-diegetic sound blocking out crucial parts of the dialogue, and even a conversation in which selected lines are re-edited so that they appear to be spoken backward. However, these experiments form a fairly small part of the work as a whole, which is generally conventional in style (aside from the length of takes and of the work as a whole).

== Exhibition ==
First shown as a work in progress at the Maison de la Culture in Le Havre, the film was re-edited down to a four-hour "short" version called Out 1: Spectre, which is more accessible and available (although not widely). Richard Roud, writing in The Guardian, called this version "a mind-blowing experience, but one which, instead of taking one 'out of this world' as the expression has it, took one right smack into the world. Or into a world which one only dimly realised was there – always right there beneath the everyday world ... the cinema will never be the same again, and nor will I." Few people had seen the full-length version prior to its 2015 home video release, though it had been championed by Chicago Reader critic Jonathan Rosenbaum, who compared it to Thomas Pynchon's Gravity's Rainbow, and has included both Out 1: Noli Me Tangere and Out 1: Spectre in the 100 films singled out from his 1000 favourite films, published in his anthology Essential Cinema.

Out 1: Noli Me Tangere was restored in Germany in 1990 and was shown again at the Rotterdam and Berlin Film Festivals shortly thereafter. It disappeared again into obscurity until 2004, when both Noli Me Tangere and its shorter version Out 1: Spectre featured in the programme on 1–21 June, in the complete retrospective Jacques Rivette Viaggio in Italia di un metteur en scène organized by Deep A.C. and curated by Goffredo De Pascale in Rome at the Sala Trevi Centro Sperimentale and in Naples at Le Grenoble. Then, only in the April/May 2006 Rivette retrospective at London's National Film Theatre, with the shorter film also screening twice across two subsequent nights at Anthology Film Archives in New York City on the same April weekend as the NFT projection of the long work. The North American premiere of Noli Me Tangere took place on 23 and 24 September 2006 in Vancouver's Vancouver International Film Centre organized by Vancouver International Film Festival programmer and Cinema Scope editor Mark Peranson, attended by around twenty people (22 at Peranson's initial count, before episode 1, though others came and went). A subsequent screening took place as a part of the 2006 festival over 30 September and 1 October, introduced by Jonathan Rosenbaum.

The subtitled Out 1: Noli Me Tangere provides a particular challenge for exhibitors, as the subtitles are not burned onto the print of the film itself, as is usual with most foreign films shown in North America. Rather, the subtitles for Out 1, provided by the British Film Institute, are projected from a computer in a separate stream (in the Vancouver screening, just below the film itself); this then has to be synchronized with the film itself, almost certainly by someone unfamiliar with the entire Out 1. Few theatres can meet this technical challenge, especially over a thirteen-hour span. In addition, the film was shot on 16mm at a nonstandard 25 frames per second, a speed few current projectors are equipped to handle. In the Vancouver screening, the film was projected at 24fps, adding about half an hour to the film as a whole.

Screenings of both the long and short works took place in late November and December 2006, during an extensive retrospective of Rivette's work which ran at the Museum of the Moving Image in Astoria, Queens, New York City. The screening of the longer version was sold out for the 9 and 10 December 2006 screening, so the Museum held an encore performance of the film on 3 and 4 March in 2007 (which came close to selling out). It was shown on both occasions over 2 days. In interviews, Rivette has explicitly stated that the work is meant to be seen theatrically "on the big screen", and apparently dislikes it being watched on television. Ironically, the preparation of the film in eight episodes was in large part due to the "naive hope", according to Rivette, of it originally being distributed like that on French television, although his disdain for that mode of exhibition only arose after the film's completion.

Out 1 was restored by Carlotta Films in 2015 and made its U.S. theatrical premiere at the Brooklyn Academy of Music on 4 November 2015. This version has now been released on DVD and Blu-ray in the U.S., while Arrow Films have released it on both formats in the UK.

The restored Out 1 was screened in London, England over two days at the Prince Charles Cinema in London on 28 and 29 November 2015. The screening was presented by the Badlands Collective and A Nos Amours. The venue hosted another screening of the entire film across one day on 31 August 2026.

== Reception ==
Out 1 has garnered acclaim from critics. The film holds an aggregate score of 87/100 on Metacritic, based on 7 critics, indicating "universal acclaim". Rotten Tomatoes reports 100% approval based on 22 reviews, with a weighted average of 8.6/10. The website's critics consensus reads: "Time is an essential character in Jacques Rivette's Out 1, Noli Me Tangere, a brilliant 13-hour study of human relationships and an exploration of how a generation's dreams and ideals slowly fade as life goes ruthlessly by."

== See also ==
- List of longest films
