= Passe montagne =

1978 comedy-drama film

- Directed by: Jean-François Stévenin
- Screenplay by: Jean-François Stévenin; Michel Delahaye
- Starring: Jean-François Stévenin
- Cinematography: Jean-Yves Escoffier; Lionel Legros
- Edited by: Yann Dedet
- Music by: Philippe Sarde
- Release date: 1978
- Language: French

Passe montagne ('Mountain Pass'), also spelled Passe-montagne and Le Passe montagne, is a 1978 French comedy-drama film co-written and directed by Jean-François Stévenin, in his directorial debut. The film was entered into the main program at the 36th Venice International Film Festival, winning the FIPRESCI Prize for Best Film.

== Cast ==
- Jean-François Stévenin as Serge
- Jacques Villeret as Georges
- Yves Le Moign
- Christine Pâris
- Texandre Barberat
- André Riva
- Jean-François Balmer
