= Cap Canaille (film) =

1983 French film

- French film poster
- Directed by: Juliet Berto; Jean-Henri Roger
- Written by: Juliet Berto; Jean-Henri Roger; Claude Vesperini
- Produced by: Ken Legargeant; Romaine Legargeant
- Starring: Juliet Berto
- Cinematography: William Lubtchansky
- Edited by: Nicole Lubtchansky
- Music by: Élisabeth Wiener; Norbert Galo
- Distributed by: UGC Distribution
- Release date: 23 February 1983
- Running time: 103 minutes
- Country: France
- Language: French

Cap Canaille is a 1983 French drama film directed by Juliet Berto and Jean-Henri Roger. It was entered into the 33rd Berlin International Film Festival.

== Plot ==
Following the arson attack on a hillside owned by the daughter of a man who had been involved in drug trafficking before he was murdered, two journalists decide to investigate the case.

== Cast ==
- Juliet Berto as Paula Baretto
- Richard Bohringer as Robert Vergès, Parisian journalist
- Jean-Claude Brialy as Samuel Kebadjan
- Bernadette Lafont as Mireille Kebadjan
- Patrick Chesnais as Wim
- Gérard Darmon as Nino Baretto, Paula's brother
- Richard Anconina as Mayolles, local journalist
- Nini Crépon as Dugrand
- Raúl Gimenez as Ernest la gâchette
- Andrex as Pascal Andreucci
- Jean Maurel as Ange Andreucci
- Toni Cecchinato as Hugo Zipo
- Richard Martin as Jo the architect
- Isabelle Ho as Miss Li
