= Closet Children =

1977 film

- Film poster
- Directed by: Benoît Jacquot
- Screenplay by: Benoît Jacquot
- Produced by: Michel Chanderli
- Starring: Brigitte Fossey; Lou Castel; Jean Sorel; Georges Marchal; Danièle Gégauff
- Cinematography: Pierre Lhomme
- Edited by: Fanette Simonet
- Distributed by: MK2 Diffusion
- Release date: 12 October 1977
- Running time: 105 minutes
- Country: France
- Language: French

Closet Children (original title: Les Enfants du Placard) is a 1977 French drama film directed by Benoît Jacquot. Brigitte Fossey was nominated for a Best Actress Cesar Award for her role in the film.

== Cast ==
- Brigitte Fossey as Juliette
- Lou Castel as Nicola
- Jean Sorel as Berlu
- Georges Marchal as the Father
- Danièle Gégauff as the Mother
- Christian Rist as Julien
- Isabelle Weingarten as Laure
- Hassane Fall as Diop
- Sophie Baragnon as Young Juliette
- Vincent Balvet as Young Nicola
- Martine Simonet as the Prostitute

== Accolades ==
Year	Award	Category	Recipient	Result
1978	César Award	Best Actress	Brigitte Fossey	Nominated
