= Melodrama Habibi =

- French poster
- Directed by: Hany Tamba
- Written by: Hany Tamba
- Produced by: Emmanuel Agneray; Jérôme Bleitrach
- Starring: Julia Kassar; Patrick Chesnais; Pierre Chammassian; Joanna Moukarzel; Pierrette Katrib; Gabriel Yammine; Lara Mattar; Maggie Badawi
- Cinematography: Emmanuel Soyer
- Music by: Khaled Mouzanar
- Distributed by: Haut et Court; Films Distributions
- Release date: 13 August 2008
- Running time: 98 minutes
- Country: Lebanon
- Languages: Arabic and French

Melodrama Habibi (Arabic:ميلودراما حبيبي, French: Une chanson dans la tête), the first feature film by Lebanese director Hany Tamba, is a 2008 Lebanese film. The film was released on August 13, 2008, in France and Belgium.

== Synopsis ==
Jamil, a rich business man in Lebanon, decides to bring a once famous French singer, Bruno Caprice, to his wife's birthday (Randa). Bruno, who was known namely for one song "Quand tu t'en vas" in the 70's, accepts the invitation and goes to Beirut. But things get complicated when Randa is kidnapped, and Jamil decides that the show must go on.

== Cast and characters ==
- Julia Kassar as Randa Harfouche
- Patrick Chesnais as Bruno Caprice
- Pierrette Katrib as Nadine
- Gabriel Yammine as Cézar
- Lara Matar as Reem Harfouche and Randa when she was young
- Pierre Chammassian as Jamil Harfouche
- Maggie Badawi as Nadine's Mother
- Majdi Machmouchi as Nadine's Father
- Fadi Reaidy as the flight passenger and Madame Rose
- Silina Choueiry as Roula (credited as Selina Choueiry)

== See also ==
- After Shave an award-winning short film by Hany Tamba.
