= Stéphane Tchalgadjieff =

French producer (born 1942)

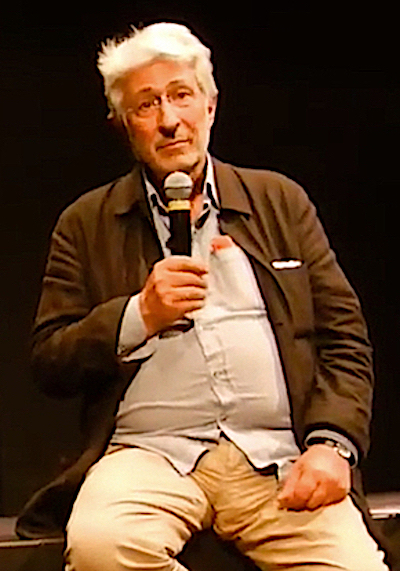
- Tchalgadjieff at the Cinémathèque française in 2012.
- Born: 18 March 1942 (age 84)
- Occupations: Film producer; Film director; CEO film production companies
- Years active: 1971-2004
- Children: Anaid Tchalgadjieff (Elizabeth Arnold Rodriguez), Sabry Tchalgadjieff, Tchingiz Tchalgadjieff, Ch'an Narramore.

Stéphane Tchalgadjieff is a French film producer and director of Armenian descent, who was born on 9 August 1942 in Bulgaria. He founded several motion picture companies: Sunchild productions (1971–1981), Sunshine (1995) and the Solaris (2002–present).

Born in Bulgaria to an Armenian family, Tchalgadjieff came to live in France as a child and became a French citizen in 1953. He studied anthropology at Columbia University and New York University. He produced movies for, among others, Robert Bresson, Michelangelo Antonioni, Jacques Rivette and Marguerite Duras. He worked with a line producer: Danièle Gégauff, former actress for Claude Chabrol.

== Filmography ==
- Eros by Michelangelo Antonioni, Steven Soderbergh, Wong Kar-Wai (2004)
- Le Chien, le Général et les Oiseaux by Francis Nielsen (animated film) (2003)
- Beyond the Clouds by Michelangelo Antonioni and Wim Wenders (1995)
- Merry-Go-Round by Jacques Rivette (1981)
- Two Lions in the Sun by Claude Faraldo (1980)
- Le Soleil en face by Pierre Kast (1980)
- Une femme au bout de la nuit by Daniel Daërt (1980)
- Le maître-nageur by Jean-Louis Trintignant (1979)
- Fidelio by Pierre Jourdan (1979)
- The Devil Probably by Robert Bresson (1977)
- Aïda by Pierre Jourdan (1977)
- Baxter, Vera Baxter by Marguerite Duras (1977)
- Duelle (une quarantaine) by Jacques Rivette (1976)
- L'assassin musicien by Benoît Jacquot (1976)
- Noroît by Jacques Rivette (1976)
- India Song by Marguerite Duras (1975)
- La Femme du Gange by Marguerite Duras (1974)
- Out 1 (noli me tangere) by Jacques Rivette (1971)
- Six in Paris by Claude Chabrol, Jean Rouch, Jean Douchet, Jean-Luc Godard, Jean-Daniel Pollet (1965) (production assistant)
