= Neige (film) =

1981 film

- Directed by: Juliet Berto; Jean-Henri Roger
- Written by: Juliet Berto; Jean-Henri Roger; Marc Villard
- Produced by: Ken Legargeant; Romaine Legargeant
- Starring: Juliet Berto
- Cinematography: William Lubtchansky
- Edited by: Yann Dedet
- Music by: François Bréant; Bernard Lavilliers
- Distributed by: UGC Distribution
- Release date: 20 May 1981
- Running time: 90 minutes
- Country: France
- Language: French

Neige is a 1981 French drama film directed by Juliet Berto and Jean-Henri Roger. It was entered into the 1981 Cannes Film Festival, where it won the Young Cinema Award.

== Plot ==
In the Pigalle and Barbès neighborhoods of Paris, Anita, a bartender, keeps frequent company with Jocko, a West Indian preacher, and Willy, an aspiring kickboxer from Hungary, but takes particular care and worry about Bobby, a teenager selling "neige" (heroin), in the midst of a visiting Christmas carnival full of games of chance and strippers. When word is out police are closing in on drug dealers, Anita begs Bobby to lie low and stop dealing, but he ignores Anita's warnings. Bobby is identified to narcotics detectives by Bruno, a neighborhood taxi driver, whose wife is in prison for shooting an earlier dealer who sold their son a fatal dosage; they have promised early parole for her in exchange for the tip. Bobby is ultimately found, pursued, and shot dead by the detectives.

With this killing, several residents of the neighborhood are cut off from their regular doses, including Betty, a trans cabaret performer. Hoping to stave off a fatal withdrawal, Anita seeks help from Jocko and Willy to find another source of heroin to keep Betty alive. Jocko proceeds through a series of random people before finally locating the local provider, an Arab shopkeeper, who agrees to sell a quantity to him. Willy seems resistant to her idea, but uses his own connections to get some. Anita, put off by Willy's reaction, cuts communication with him, and tells Jocko she will deliver the heroin to Betty. Through a combination of surveillance, phone taps, and another likely informant, the police find out about the meeting between Betty and Anita. Willy tries to contact Betty on his own, but the cabaret proprietor refuses to tell him when she is scheduled to perform, and a fellow trans prostitute friend of Betty's lies about seeing her, thinking Willy a threat. Willy later sees Betty taken into custody by police, and sets out to warn his friends.

Plainclothes police infiltrate the club where Anita and Jocko are biding time. One confronts Jocko, warning him not to tip off anyone or interfere. When Anita goes to the bathroom to place the heroin in a hiding place, she is intercepted by two narcs. Willy enters, manages to disarm one officer, and tries to bully the other into letting her go. However, a third officer enters and shoots Willy dead. Jocko leaves the scene, it is assumed that Anita has been arrested, and Betty's fate is left ambiguous.

== Cast ==
- Juliet Berto - Anita
- Jean-François Stévenin - Willy
- Robert Liensol - Jocko
- Paul Le Person - Bruno Vallès
- Patrick Chesnais - The first Inspector
- Jean-François Balmer - The second Inspector
- Ras Paul Nephtali - Bobby
- Nini Crépon - Betty
- Dominique Collignon-Maurin - The blond
- Frédérique Jamet - Annie Vallès
- Émilie Benoît - Boccador
- Michel Lechat - Lechat
- Michel Berto - The blind man
- Roger Delaporte - Borelli
- Michel Nedjar - Menendez (as Nedjar)*
- Frédérique Jamet - Annie Vallès
- Raymond Bussières - Pierrot
- Eddie Constantine - Eddie
- Bernard Lavilliers - Franco
