= A Personal Journey with Martin Scorsese Through American Movies =

1995 film directed by Martin Scorsese and Michael Henry Wilson

- Film poster
- Directed by: Martin Scorsese; Michael Henry Wilson
- Written by: Martin Scorsese; Michael Henry Wilson
- Produced by: Florence Dauman; Martin Scorsese
- Starring: Martin Scorsese
- Cinematography: Jean-Yves Escoffier; Frances Reid; Nancy Schreiber
- Edited by: Kenneth Levis; David Lindblom
- Music by: Elmer Bernstein
- Production companies: British Film Institute; Miramax Films
- Release date: 21 May 1995 (United Kingdom)
- Running time: 225 minutes
- Country: United Kingdom
- Language: English

A Personal Journey with Martin Scorsese Through American Movies is a 1995 British documentary film of 225 minutes in length, presented by Martin Scorsese and produced by the British Film Institute.

In the film Martin Scorsese examines a selection of his favorite American films grouped according to four different types of directors: the director as story-teller; the director as an illusionist such as D. W. Griffith and F. W. Murnau, who created new editing techniques among other innovations that made the appearance of sound and color possible later on; the director as a smuggler such as filmmakers Douglas Sirk, Samuel Fuller, and Vincente Minnelli, who used to hide subversive messages in their films; and the director as an iconoclast, those filmmakers attacking social conventionalism such as Charles Chaplin, Erich von Stroheim, Orson Welles, Elia Kazan, Nicholas Ray, Stanley Kubrick, Arthur Penn, and Sam Peckinpah.

== Summary ==
The documentary is structured in segments:

- Part I
  - The director's dilemma
  - The director as storyteller
    - The Western
    - The Gangster film
    - The Musical
- Part II
  - The director as illusionist
  - The director as smuggler I
- Part III
  - The director as smuggler II
  - The director as iconoclast

It was originally shown on television in the UK in 1995.

== Films mentioned ==
(Roughly in the order of the appearance.)

=== Part I ===
- The Bad and the Beautiful, 1952, directed by Vincente Minnelli
- Duel in the Sun, nicknamed "Lust in the Dust", 1946 Western film directed by King Vidor, William Dieterle and others
- The Girl Can't Help It, 1956 Musical film directed by Frank Tashlin
- Bigger Than Life, 1956 directed by Nicholas Ray
- Vertigo, 1958 psychological thriller film directed by Alfred Hitchcock
- The Naked Kiss, 1964 neo-noir film written and directed by Samuel Fuller
- Murder by Contract, 1958 film noir directed by Irving Lerner
- The Red House, 1947 psychological thriller directed by Delmer Daves
- The Phenix City Story, 1955 film noir directed by Phil Karlson
- Sullivan's Travels, 1941 comedy film written and directed by Preston Sturges
- The Crowd, 1928 silent film directed by King Vidor
- The Big Parade, 1925 silent film directed by King Vidor
- Shadow of a Doubt, 1943 thriller film directed by Alfred Hitchcock
- Mr. Smith Goes to Washington, 1939, directed by Frank Capra

==== The Director as Storyteller ====
The Western

- The Great Train Robbery, 1903 Western film written, produced, and directed by Edwin S. Porter
- The Musketeers of Pig Alley, 1912, directed by D. W. Griffith
- High Sierra, 1941, directed by Raoul Walsh
- Colorado Territory, 1949 western film directed by Raoul Walsh (a remake of the 1941 High Sierra)
- Stagecoach, 1939 western film directed by John Ford
- She Wore a Yellow Ribbon, 1949 western film directed by John Ford
- The Searchers, 1956 western film directed by John Ford
- The Furies, 1950 American Western film directed by Anthony Mann
- The Naked Spur, 1953 American Western film directed by Anthony Mann
- The Tall T, 1957 Western film directed by Budd Boetticher
- The Left Handed Gun, 1958 American western film and the film directorial debut of Arthur Penn
- Unforgiven, 1992 American Western film produced and directed by Clint Eastwood
- Directed by John Ford 1971 documentary directed by Peter Bogdanovich

The Gangster Film

- The Public Enemy, 1931 American Pre-Code crime film directed by William A. Wellman
- Regeneration, 1915, directed by Raoul Walsh
- Scarface, 1932 American gangster film directed by Howard Hawks (and Richard Rosson)
- The Roaring Twenties, 1939 crime thriller directed by Raoul Walsh
- I Walk Alone, 1948 film noir directed by Byron Haskin.
- Force of Evil, 1948 film noir directed by Abraham Polonsky
- Point Blank, 1967 American crime film directed by John Boorman

The Musical

- Gold Diggers of 1935, 1935 musical film directed and choreographed by Busby Berkeley
- Gold Diggers of 1933, 1933 musical film directed by Mervyn LeRoy, staged and choreographed by Busby Berkeley
- 42nd Street, 1933 musical film directed by Lloyd Bacon with choreography by Busby Berkeley
- Footlight Parade, 1933 musical film directed by Lloyd Bacon with choreography by Busby Berkeley
- Meet Me in St. Louis, 1944 musical film directed by Vincente Minnelli
- My Dream Is Yours, 1949 musical and comedy film directed by Michael Curtiz
  - New York, New York, 1977 musical directed by Martin Scorsese (film mentioned in connection with My Dream Is Yours)
- The Band Wagon, 1953 musical film directed by Vincente Minnelli
- A Star Is Born, 1954 musical film directed by George Cukor
- All That Jazz, 1979 musical film directed by Bob Fosse

=== Part II ===
==== The Director as Illusionist ====
- The Cameraman, 1928 silent comedy directed by Edward Sedgwick and an uncredited Buster Keaton
- The Birth of a Nation, 1915 silent film directed by D. W. Griffith
- Death's Marathon, 1913 silent film directed by D. W. Griffith
- Cabiria, 1914 Italian silent film directed by Giovanni Pastrone
- Intolerance, 1916 silent film directed by D. W. Griffith
- The Ten Commandments (1923), 1923 silent film directed by Cecil B. DeMille
- Samson and Delilah, 1949, directed by Cecil B. DeMille
- The Ten Commandments (1956), 1956, directed by Cecil B. DeMille
- Sunrise: A Song of Two Humans, 1927 silent film directed by F. W. Murnau
- Seventh Heaven, 1927 silent film directed by Frank Borzage
- Anna Christie, 1930, directed by Clarence Brown
- Her Man, 1930, directed by Tay Garnett
- The Big House, 1930, directed by George W. Hill
- Leave Her to Heaven, 1945 film noir directed by John M. Stahl
- Johnny Guitar, 1954 Western film directed by Nicholas Ray
- The Robe, 1953 Biblical epic film directed by Henry Koster
- East of Eden, 1955, directed by Elia Kazan
- Some Came Running, 1958, directed by Vincente Minnelli
- Land of the Pharaohs, 1955, directed and produced by Howard Hawks
- The Fall of the Roman Empire, 1964, directed by Anthony Mann
- The Young Indiana Jones Chronicles, American television series from 4 March 1992 to 24 July 1993, created and executive produced by George Lucas, directed by various directors
- 2001: A Space Odyssey, 1968 science fiction film produced and directed by Stanley Kubrick

==== The Director as Smuggler ====
- Cat People, 1942 horror film directed by Jacques Tourneur
- I Walked with a Zombie, 1943 horror film directed by Jacques Tourneur
- Letter from an Unknown Woman, 1948 film directed by Max Ophüls, based on the novella written by Stefan Zweig
- Scarlet Street, 1945 American film noir directed by Fritz Lang
- Detour, 1945, directed by Edgar G. Ulmer
- Double Indemnity, 1944 film noir directed by Billy Wilder
- Crime Wave, 1954 film noir directed by André De Toth
- Outrage, 1950, directed by noted film noir actress and pioneering female director Ida Lupino
- Gun Crazy, 1950 film noir directed by Joseph H. Lewis
- T-Men, 1947 film noir directed by Anthony Mann
- Raw Deal, 1948 film noir directed by Anthony Mann
- Kiss Me Deadly, 1955 film noir directed by Robert Aldrich

=== Part III ===
- Silver Lode, 1954, directed by Allan Dwan
- All That Heaven Allows, 1955, directed by Douglas Sirk
- Bigger Than Life, 1956, directed by Nicholas Ray
- Forty Guns, 1957 western film directed by Samuel Fuller
- Pickup on South Street, 1953 film noir directed by Samuel Fuller
- Shock Corridor, 1963, directed by Samuel Fuller
- Two Weeks in Another Town, 1962, directed by Vincente Minnelli

==== The Director as Iconoclast ====
- Broken Blossoms, 1919 silent film directed by D. W. Griffith
- The Wedding March, 1928 silent film directed by Erich von Stroheim
- I Am a Fugitive from a Chain Gang, 1932, directed by Mervyn LeRoy
- Hell's Highway, 1932, directed by Rowland Brown
- Wild Boys of the Road, 1933, directed by William Wellman
- Heroes for Sale, 1933, directed by William Wellman
- The Scarlet Empress, 1934, directed and produced by Josef von Sternberg
- Citizen Kane, 1941, directed by and starring Orson Welles
- The Magnificent Ambersons, 1942, directed and written by Orson Welles
- The Great Dictator, 1940, directed by Charlie Chaplin
- A Streetcar Named Desire, 1951, directed by Elia Kazan
- On the Waterfront, 1954, directed by Elia Kazan
- Apache, 1954, directed by Robert Aldrich
- Blackboard Jungle, 1955, directed by Richard Brooks
- The Wild One, 1953, Directed by László Benedek
- Advise & Consent, 1962, directed by Otto Preminger
- Paths of Glory, 1957, directed by Stanley Kubrick
- I Want to Live!, 1958 film noir directed by Robert Wise
- The Man with the Golden Arm, 1955, directed by Otto Preminger
- Sweet Smell of Success, 1957 film noir directed by Alexander Mackendrick
- One, Two, Three, 1961 comedy directed by Billy Wilder
- Bonnie and Clyde, 1967, directed by Arthur Penn
- Lolita, 1962, directed by Stanley Kubrick
- Barry Lyndon, 1975, directed by Stanley Kubrick
- Faces, 1968, directed by John Cassavetes
- America America, 1963, directed by Elia Kazan
- The Grapes of Wrath, 1940, directed by John Ford

== See also ==
- The Story of Film: An Odyssey, a 2011 documentary film by Mark Cousins similar in content
- New Hollywood
- Classical Hollywood cinema
