= Merry-Go-Round (1981 film) =

- Theatrical release poster
- Directed by: Jacques Rivette
- Written by: Jacques Rivette; Eduardo de Gregorio; Suzanne Schiffman
- Produced by: Stéphane Tchalgadjieff
- Starring: Maria Schneider; Joe Dallesandro
- Production company: Sunchild productions
- Distributed by: Roissy Films
- Release dates: October 9, 1981 (Germany); April 6, 1983 (France)
- Running time: 160 minutes
- Country: France
- Languages: French; English

Merry-Go-Round is a 1981 French experimental mystery directed by Jacques Rivette, starring Maria Schneider and Joe Dallesandro. The film, which revolves around a kidnapping plot, follows a structure similar to that of a crime drama. The script was written by Rivette in collaboration with Eduardo de Gregorio and Suzanne Schiffman, with dialogue by de Gregorio. Filming took place in 1977, but the film remained unreleased until 1981.

== Plot ==
Élisabeth (Danièle Gégauff) sends telegrams to her ex-boyfriend Ben (Dallesandro) in New York City and to her younger sister Léo (Schneider) in Rome to join her in Paris, where she is selling her dead father's estate. On the day of their respective arrivals, Élisabeth fails to show up at the airport. Ben is initially lost, being barely able to speak any French; he meets Léo, who happens to be fluent in English. After both waiting in vain at the airport, they decide to search for Élisabeth, though she is eventually kidnapped as soon as they find her.

The plot also involves a mystery about the activities of Léo and Élisabeth's absentee father, a wealthy man who went missing after being accused of fraud and is now presumed dead. His disappearance may be connected with that of a million dollars. Ben meets his sister, Shirley, who turns out to have been the girlfriend of Léo and Élisabeth's father. Léo and Ben investigate and find themselves into a series of strange, dangerous situations.

The story is intercut with unexplained scenes of Ben running aimlessly in a forest, and being confronted by a hostile woman who wears the same clothes as Léo and vaguely resembles her.

== Cast ==
- Maria Schneider as Léo
- Joe Dallesandro as Ben
- Danièle Gégauff as Élisabeth
- Sylvie Meyer as Shirley
- Françoise Prévost as Renée Novick
- Maurice Garrel as Julius Danvers
- Michel Berto as Jérôme
- Dominique Erlanger as secretary
- Frédéric Mitterrand as lawyer
- Jean-François Stévenin as decorator
- Pascale Dauman as nurse
- Marc Labrousse as first accomplice
- Jean Hernandez as second accomplice
- Benjamin Legrand as chauffeur
- Florence Bernard as woman in the cemetery
- Humbert Balsan as knight
- Hermine Karagheuz as "the Other"

== Production ==
During the 1970s, Jacques Rivette worked with producer Stéphane Tchalgadjieff on Scènes de la vie parallèle, a projected four-film series which focused on enigmatic, supernatural stories. Of the four films, only the first two, Duelle and Noroît, were completed, with Rivette suffering a nervous breakdown on the second day of filming the third one, Histoire de Marie et Julien (which he eventually remade in 2003). Merry-Go-Round was conceived, again with Tchalgadjieff's backing, in the aftermath of this project's collapse, once Rivette had recovered and decided that he needed a project to start over.

Rivette and Maria Schneider had already considered working together before; the idea of Merry-Go-Round emerged after Schneider told Rivette that she would be interested in working with Joe Dallesandro. Rivette used the encounter between the two actors as a pretext for setting a story in motion. Rivette later said, in an interview with critics Serge Daney and Jean Narboni: "We had a starting point of course, and then we made up the beginning of a story, with a father who had disappeared, but all along we told ourselves, this is just a pretext for Maria and Joe to get to know each other. I like that idea: two people get together because a third, who has arranged to meet them, does not show up. There have no choice but to get to know each other." Rivette likened that situation with those that would occur during the war, in the context of the Resistance. But since he didn't feel like making a spy movie, he used a "more banal situation, two people convoked by a third who is only the sister of the one and the girlfriend of the other."

Though Rivette had met Scheider before starting this project, he didn't really know either of the actors one month before shooting began. Principal photography began in 1977. The story was largely improvised and aspects were developed due to the difficult shooting conditions. Both lead actors were struggling at the time with drug addictions, with Schneider also undergoing severe emotional problems. Rivette himself was on the verge of a second nervous breakdown. Also, whereas the whole film was built upon the encounter between Schneider and Dallesandro, their working relationship quickly deteriorated. Dallesandro later said that it was Schneider who began detesting him, for reasons he was unsure about; nevertheless, he kept trying to cheer her up throughout the difficult production. According to Rivette, "since the relationship between Maria and Joe rapidly became hostile, we were forced to develop the story-line; from a mere pretext it took on a disproportionate importance." The director said that despite the chaotic production and having quickly realized that the film would not benefit his career, Dallesandro had shown "impeccable seriousness".

Schneider eventually left production without completing her scenes, with actress Hermine Karagheuz (who had previously appeared in Duelle) filling in for her during the scenes that featured Dallesandro running in the forest. Dallesandro later said, about this part of the production : "They kept shooting these scenes where I was running. Running, running, running. It got so bad that I wasn't even aware Maria had left the picture. She was so far away during those endless scenes that I had no idea they'd replaced her with a double. That's when I really understood that this movie could go on forever. If they'd have replaced me with a double, they'd still be out there shooting." Rivette kept filming improvised material with no end in sight. Eventually, Dallesandro injured himself by falling from a motorcycle. Even though the actor was willing to keep on working, the producers decided to use his injury as a pretext to stop filming, later claiming insurance in order to pay everyone involved.

Rivette managed to edit the footage he had shot into a 2h30 film, but the finished product was found unsuitable for release by Gaumont. The film was only released in 1981 in Germany, and did not receive a general release in France - to lukewarm reviews - until 1983. At that point, Rivette had already rebuilt his career thanks to the release of Le Pont du Nord (1981).

Rivette later commented that though the improvised storyline may have given Merry-Go-Round "a certain vagabond charm", it was "a film with a first half-hour that's quite coherent, and then it searches for itself three times."

== Home media ==
Merry-Go-Round was released on DVD and Blu-ray in 2019. It was also included into a 3-DVD set together with Duelle and Noroît.
