= Triplex (film) =

- Theatrical release poster
- Directed by: Georges Lautner
- Written by: Didier Van Cauwelaert
- Produced by: Alain Poiré
- Starring: Patrick Chesnais, Cécile Pallas, François-Eric Gendron
- Cinematography: Yves Rodallec
- Edited by: Georges Klotz
- Music by: Raymond Alessandrini
- Distributed by: Gaumont Distribution
- Release date: 17 April 1991
- Country: France
- Language: French
- Box office: $515.000

Triplex is a French film directed by Georges Lautner, and released in 1991.

== Crew ==
- Director: Georges Lautner
- Writer: Didier Van Cauwelaert
- Music: Raymond Alessandrini
- Editor: Georges Klotz

== Cast ==
- Patrick Chesnais: Nicolas Montgerbier
- Cécile Pallas: Nathalie Challes
- François-Eric Gendron: Frank
- Jacques François: Mr Challes
- Jacques Jouanneau: father of Frank
- Sophie Carle: Brigitte
- Gilles Veber: Jacky
- Laurent Gamelon: Mario
- Julien Courbey
