= Baxter, Vera Baxter =

1977 film by Marguerite Duras

- Theatrical release poster
- Directed by: Marguerite Duras
- Written by: Marguerite Duras
- Produced by: Stéphane Tchalgadjieff; Danièle Gégauff
- Starring: Delphine Seyrig; Claudine Gabay; Gérard Depardieu; Noëlle Châtelet; Nathalie Nell; Claude Aufort
- Cinematography: Sacha Vierny
- Edited by: Dominique Auvray; Caroline Camus; Roselyne Petit
- Music by: Carlos d'Alessio
- Production companies: Institut national de l'audiovisuel; Sunchild Productions
- Distributed by: MK2 Diffusion
- Release date: 8 June 1977
- Running time: 95 minutes
- Country: France
- Language: French

Baxter, Vera Baxter is a 1977 French drama film written and directed by Marguerite Duras, based on her then-unpublished novel Vera Baxter ou les Plages de l'Atlantique.

== Synopsis ==
The film opens with Vera Baxter posing. In the next scene we are inside the bar of a hotel and hear the clerk respond to an inquiring woman about the luxurious seaside house and Vera Baxter. There's also a man named Cayre present, who has failed to get in touch with Vera Baxter. We see Vera again in a grande rental villa. She receives two visitors, and we hear her story about her marriage from these conversations.

== Cast ==
- Delphine Seyrig as the unknown woman
- Noëlle Châtelet as Monique Combès
- Nathalie Nell as Jean's mistress
- Claude Aufort as the barman
- Claudine Gabay as Vera Baxter
- Gérard Depardieu as Michel Cayre

== Themes and interpretations ==
The Criterion Collection described Baxter, Vera Baxter as a "hypnotically unsettling journey into one woman's existential emptiness. Ensconced in a sprawling rental villa, the world-weary Vera Baxter ... receives visits from two women, including a mysterious stranger ... to whom she recounts a shocking story about her marriage, the way she lives, and the reasons for her malaise." Ivone Margulies, also writing for The Criterion Collection, viewed the film as "a harsh take on bourgeois conformity and prostitution, or, in [Duras's] words, 'an infernal circuit that shuttles her from the love of her children to her conjugal duties.'"

== Home media ==
Baxter, Vera Baxter was released by The Criterion Collection on Blu-ray and DVD on 28 February 2023 as part of the Two Films by Marguerite Duras box set along with India Song (1975).
