= Tumultes (1990 film) =

1990 film

- Directed by: Bertrand Van Effenterre
- Written by: Bertrand Van Effenterre; Claire Alexandrakis
- Produced by: Bertrand Van Effenterre; Marilyn Watelet
- Starring: Julie Jézéquel; Bruno Cremer
- Cinematography: Yves Angelo
- Edited by: Joële Van Effenterre
- Release date: 13 June 1990
- Running time: 91 minutes
- Countries: France; Belgium
- Language: French

Tumultes is a 1990 French-Belgian drama film directed by Bertrand Van Effenterre. It was screened in the Un Certain Regard section at the 1990 Cannes Film Festival.

== Cast ==
- Julie Jézéquel - Anne
- Bruno Cremer - The Father
- Nelly Borgeaud - The Mother
- Clotilde de Bayser - Isabelle
- Laure Marsac - Claude
- Jean-Pierre Moulin - Le curé
- Jean-Paul Comart - Yves
- Christian Cloarec - Pierre
- Jean-Michel Portal - Bruno
- Guy Abgrall - Robin
- Jean-Christophe Bleton - Le danseur
- Stéphane Houy - Patrick
