= Joy of Learning =

- The film's poster, bearing its French title.
- Directed by: Jean-Luc Godard
- Screenplay by: Jean-Luc Godard
- Based on: Emile, or On Education by Jean-Jacques Rousseau
- Starring: Juliet Berto; Jean-Pierre Léaud
- Narrated by: Jean-Luc Godard
- Cinematography: Germaine Cohen
- Release date: 28 June 1969
- Running time: 95 minutes
- Country: France
- Language: French

Joy of Learning (French: Le Gai savoir) is a 1969 experimental film by Jean-Luc Godard. The shooting started before the events of May 68 and was finished shortly afterwards. Coproduced by the O.R.T.F., the film was upon completion rejected by French national television, then released in the cinema where it was subsequently banned by the French government. The film is an adaptation of Emile, or On Education, Jean-Jacques Rousseau's treatise on education, and its title is a reference to Nietzsche's The Gay Science. The film was entered into the 19th Berlin International Film Festival.

== Synopsis ==
Patricia and Emile meet seven times over four years inside a black void-like space, revealed to be a TV studio by their out-of-character actors towards the end. They explore sound and image using various media, including documentary footage, the radio, printed books and comics, videotaped interviews, television, 2-dimensional works of art, poetry and different kinds of films. Often, the material they are studying is not shown to the viewer. A lot of emphasis is placed on the effect of sound, with some stretches of the film lacking any visual content. Other parts are often interrupted suddenly, often with images of photographs and magazines with fragments of messages written on them in Godard's handwriting. Color also plays an important role in their experiments, for example with Berto's character being dressed only in black and red clothing, colors which are commonly used by radical left-wing political groups.

The two young students attempt to learn the theoretical foundations and practical applications of audiovisual communication to understand the workings of ideology and further their revolutionary goals through film media. This reflects the simultaneous theoretical development at Cahiers du Cinéma, a left-wing film journal Godard was associated with, and where at this time several texts were published calling on filmmakers to carry out theoretical work before making films and to examine how capitalist ideology is disseminated unknowingly through traditional film form.

Godard himself appears as a teacher figure through a whispered voice-over narration paired with electronic sounds, communicating with the characters and the viewer. The film seems to reflect Godard himself looking for new forms of film outside of the traditional rules set by Hollywood and soviet film. It is based on the concept of "back to zero", meaning to strip away most established film components like some kind of set and linear perspective with a vanishing point, any plot development, character arcs etc. and to examine the effects of simple images and sounds in a formalist experimental process, similar to Soviet filmmakers of the 1920s and their discovery of the Kuleshov effect, and mirroring efforts of communist directors Sergei Eisenstein and especially Dziga Vertov, after whom Godard would later name his left-wing director's duo.

Godard had previously proclaimed the "End of Cinema" at the end of his previous film, Weekend. His work in the years after Joy of Learning often lacks fundamental elements of traditional films, with the aim of finding the way of communist revolutionary film making. For example, a development of a close relationship between Patricia and Emile is suggested, however no usual normative indication of a sexual nature of this relationship is given. Godard's previous films had often centered on a romantic couple and feelings of love and envy; it can thus be said this film marks an end of the theme of romance in his work.

== Production ==
The film underwent a lengthy period of shooting and editing throughout 1967/68 and was only released in 1969. Most of the material was probably shot before the events of May 68. Initially, Godard pitched the film to O.R.T.F. as more closely based on Rousseau's text. After completion, the film was rejected by French television and after a lengthy period of disputes over rights completed in West Germany. It's possible Jean-Pierre Gorin, a filmmaker Godard would soon go on to collaborate with in the form of Dziga Vertov Group, already had the chance to exert some influence in the post-production of the film. It's probable Godard had expected the film to reach a wider audience than some of his previous radical films through the medium of television. The film was shown on TV in Quebec.

== Cast ==
- Juliet Berto - Patricia Lumumba, daughter of Congolese revolutionary Patrice Lumumba
- Jean-Pierre Léaud - Émile Rousseau, descendant of french philosopher Jean-Jacques Rousseau
- Jean-Luc Godard - Narrator (voice)

Both Berto and Léaud had appeared in some of Godard's previous films, most importantly La Chinoise, where they are depicted as young students undergoing a radicalizing process while studying works of Mao Zedong, and in Weekend.

Other, uncredited actors are depicted for short periods in the film: a young boy and an old man are interviewed in a way akin to a word association test, and seemingly interacting with some kind of newly invented video or audio recording device to play back their statements. Some context-less footage of modern city dwellers is also sometimes played.
