= Olivier Peyon =

French screenwriter and film director (born 1969)

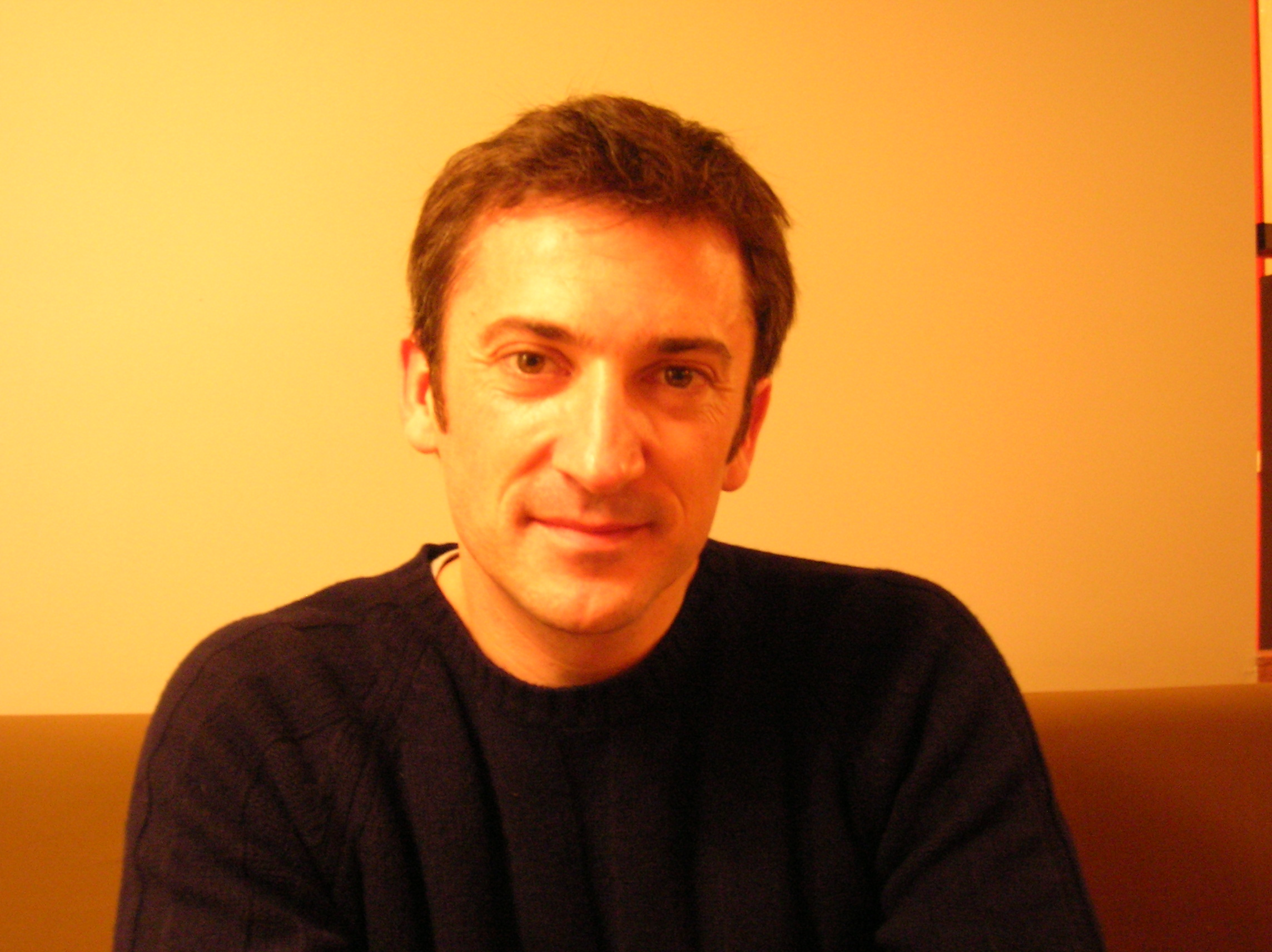
- Born: 23 January 1969 (age 57); L'Haÿ-les-Roses, France
- Occupations: Film director Screenwriter

Olivier Peyon is a French screenwriter and film director, born in L'Haÿ-les-Roses, France, on January 23, 1969.

Olivier Peyon grew up in the suburbs of Paris. He went to college in Nantes to study Economics then returned to Paris where he began working as a production assistant, notably on films by Idrissa Ouedraogo. Then he translated English-language films for French distribution, including works by Coen Brothers(Fargo, The Big Lebowski, O'Brother, Intolerable Cruelty), Ken Loach (The Wind that shakes the barley), Stephen Frears (High Fidelity, The Hi-Lo Country), Danny Boyle (Trainspotting, Shallow Grave, A Life Less Ordinary), Jane Campion (Portrait of a Lady), as well as Four Weddings and a Funeral, Being John Malkovich, Notting Hill, The Usual Suspects and the TV series CSI: Crime Scene Investigation.

He started out with the short film Promis, juré (1996), followed by Jingle Bells (1997), selected for the 54th Venice Film Festival, Claquage après étirements (2000), and À tes amours (2001), awarded at New York City, Gardanne, Luchon and La Ciotat.

His first feature film, Stolen Holidays (Les Petites Vacances), was released in 2007, starring Claude Brasseur and Bernadette Lafont (one of the Nouvelle Vague's muses, in François Truffaut's and Claude Chabrol's movies).

He has recently written and directed two documentaries for Empreintes, a French documentary series produced by France 5: the first one is a portrait of Elisabeth Badinter, a French author, feminist and professor of philosophy at the École Polytechnique in Paris, daughter of the late Marcel Bleustein-Blanchet, founder of the Publicis Groupe, and the wife of Robert Badinter, a French lawyer, law professor and previous French Minister of Justice. The second documentary is about Michel Onfray, a contemporary French philosopher who adheres to hedonism, atheism and anarchism, an author on philosophy with more than 50 written books translated in 30 countries.

How I Came to Hate Math (Comment j'ai détesté les maths) is Peyon's second feature film. It is an international documentary about the place of mathematics in today's world. Produced by Arte and Haut & Court, the film was released in French theaters in November 2013. The film was well received by audiences and critics alike, and performed well at the box office. It was nominated for best documentary at the CESAR 2014 (the French equivalent of the Oscars).

The success of the film has continued with its release on DVD along with a specifically edited extra film En Route for the Fields Medal, a portrait of French mathematician Cédric Villani on his way to receive the 2010 Fields Medal in Hyderabad, India.

Comment j'ai détesté les maths was also screened in front of an audience of 2000 at the 2014 ICM (International Congress of Mathematicians) in Seoul. It won the 2014 d'Alembert Prize, the Golden Owl prize at Bergen International Film Festival, Norway, and the International Science Film Festival World of Knowledge award in Saint Petersburg, Russia.

== Filmography ==
- 1996 : Promis, juré (short movie)
- 1997 : Jingle Bells (short movie)
- 2001 : Claquage après étirements (short movie)
- 2001 : À tes amours (short movie)
- 2007 : Stolen Holidays (Les Petites Vacances)
- 2009 : Elisabeth Badinter, à contre-courant (documentary, Collection Empreintes, France 5)
- 2011 : Michel Onfray, philosophe citoyen (documentary, Collection Empreintes, France 5)
- 2013 : How I Came to Hate Math (Comment j'ai détesté les maths) (documentary cinema)
- 2014 : En route pour la médaille Fields (documentary)
- 2021 : Tokyo Shaking (movie)
- 2022 : Lie with Me (movie)

== Nomination Awards ==
- 1997 : better short-measuring with the international Festival of Brussels, for Promis, juré.
- 2002 : better short-measuring with the international Festival of French-speaking film of Namur, for Claquage après étirements.
- 2006 : better film with the international Festival of Mannheim-Heidelberg, for Stolen Holidays.
