= Jean-François Stévenin =

French actor (1944–2021)

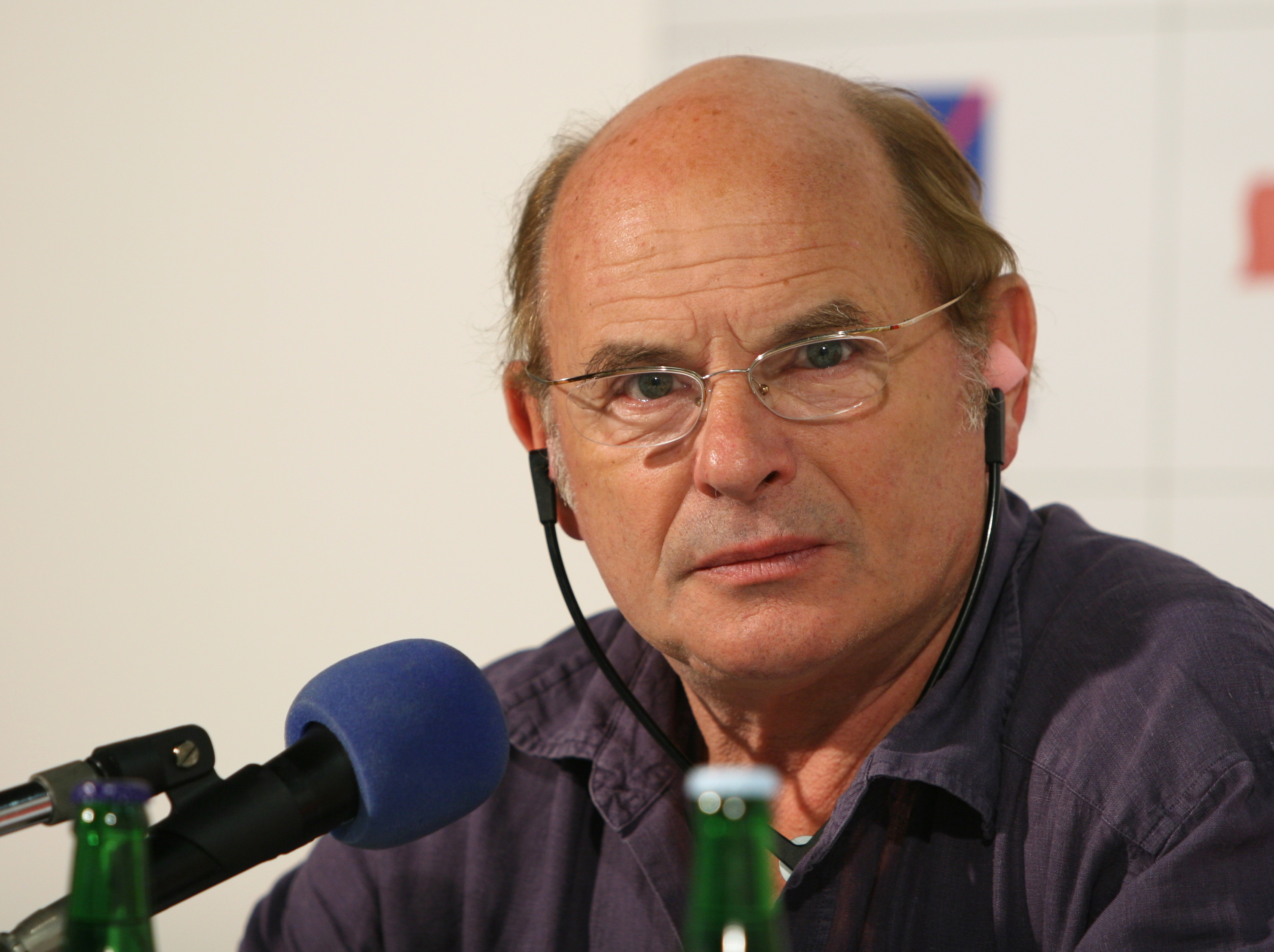
- Stévenin in 2008
- Born: 23 April 1944; Lons-le-Saunier, France
- Died: 27 July 2021 (aged 77); Neuilly-sur-Seine, France
- Occupations: Actor; Film director Screenwriter; Film editor
- Years active: 1968–2021

Jean-François Stévenin (French: [ʒɑ̃ fʁɑ̃swa stevnɛ̃]; 23 April 1944 – 27 July 2021) was a French actor and filmmaker. He appeared in 150 films and television shows since 1968. He made his directorial debut in 1978, with Passe montagne. He starred in the film Cold Moon, which was entered into the 1991 Cannes Film Festival.

He graduated from HEC Paris in 1967.

== Filmography ==
- La Chamade (1968) as Le jeune homme au pull bleu dans le bistrot (uncredited)
- The Wild Child (1970) as Countryman
- Out 1 (1971) as Marlon
- Such a Gorgeous Kid Like Me (1972) as Le vendeur de journaux (uncredited)
- Day for Night (1973) as Jean-François, l'assistant réalisateur
- Si j'te cherche... j'me trouve (1974) as Jean-François
- Zig-Zag (1975) as Un client de Marie & Pauline (uncredited)
- Small Change (1976) as Jean-François Richet, the Schoolteacher
- Barocco (1976) as Jeune homme brun
- The Old Country Where Rimbaud Died (1977) as Le chauffeur de taxi / Le peintre / Le marchand de tableaux
- The Machine (1977) as L'évêque
- La Tortue sur le dos (1978) as Paul
- Passe montagne (1978) as Serge
- Adieu voyages lents (1978) as Maurice
- Mais ou et donc Ornicar (1979) as Michel
- Roberte (1979) as Von A.
- Écoute voir (1979) as Inspecteur Mercier
- The Police War (1979) as Capati
- Two Lions in the Sun (1980) as Paul
- The Dogs of War (1980) as Michel
- Psy (1981) as Jo
- Allons z'enfants (1981) as Sergent Billotet
- Neige (1981) as Willy
- Escape to Victory (1981) as Claude - The French
- Le Pont du Nord (1981) as Max
- Merry-Go-Round (1981) as Le décorateur
- Y a-t-il un Français dans la salle? (1982) as Paul Pauley
- Passion (1982) as Le machino
- A Room in Town (1982) as Dambiel
- Poussière d'empire (1983) as Sergeant Tam-Tam
- Flight to Berlin (1984) as Edouard
- Notre histoire (1984) as Chatelard
- Côté coeur, côté jardin (1984) as François
- Parole de flic (1985) as Sylvain Dubor
- Treasure Island (1985) as Israel Hands (The Rat)
- Evening Dress (1986) as Husband in house 3
- Salomè (1986) as Nerva's Aide-de-camp
- Je hais les acteurs (1986) as Chester Devlin
- Double messieurs (1986) as François
- The Rebellion of the Hanged (1986) as Don Severo
- Sale destin (1987) as Djebel Zanera
- Vent de panique (1987) as Le ferrailleur
- Ya bon les blancs (1988) as Peter
- 36 Fillette (1988) as Le père
- Les Maris, les Femmes, les Amants (1989) as Martin
- La soule (1989) as Colonel Valbert
- as Louis Legendre
- Thick Skinned (1989) as Roland
- Mona et moi (1989) as Le père
- Napoléon et l'Europe (1991, TV series) as Napoleon
- Cold Moon (1991) as Simon
- Sushi Sushi (1991) as Richard Souriceau
- Un paraguas para tres (1992) as Pierre Korzeniowski
- La Gamine (1992) as Charly
- Olivier, Olivier (1992) as l'inspecteur Druot
- Day of Atonement (1992) as Eric Lemonnier
- De force avec d'autres (1993) as L'alcoolique
- À cause d'elle (1993) as Jacques Hervy
- 23h58 (1993) as Bernard
- The Patriots (1994) as Remy Prieur
- Parano (1994) as Le client (episode "Nuit d'essence")
- Dis-moi oui (1995) as Docteur Arnaud
- Fast (1995) as Francis
- Noir comme le souvenir (1995) as Commissaire Vasseur
- Les Frères Gravet (1996) as Pierre Gravet
- L'Éducatrice (1996) as Schaeffer
- Les Bidochon (1996) as Robert Bidochon
- Les Aveux de l'innocent (1996) as Inspecteur Reigent
- K (1997) as Commissaire Cortès
- On Guard (1997) as Cocardasse
- White Lies (1998) as Marcel
- For Sale (1998) as Pierre Lindien
- Fait d'hiver (1999) as Commandant Ducroix
- Love me (2000) as Carbonne
- Total western (2000) as Jean-Mi
- Les Frères Sœur (2000) as Darius
- Brotherhood of the Wolf (2001) as Sardis
- De l'amour (2001) as Bertrand, the cop
- Fils de zup (2001) as Vanelli (policier)
- Mischka (2002) as Gégène
- The Repentant (2002) as Man at posh party
- Two (2002) as Man in the car
- The Man on the Train (2002) as Luigi
- Pas si grave (2003) as Manolete
- Camping à la ferme (2005) as Gaston
- Il a suffi que maman s'en aille... (2006) as Olivier
- Les Yeux bandés (2007) as Émile
- Capitaine Achab (2007) as Le père d'Achab
- Room of Death (2007) as Léon
- El camino (2008)
- Home (2008) (voice)
- Les Tremblements lointains (2008)
- Un monde à nous (2008) as Le collègue d'Éric
- Dirty money, l'infiltré (2008)
- Nuit de chien (2008) as Martins
- Like a Star Shining in the Night (2008) as Le père d'Anne
- The Limits of Control (2009) as The Frenchman
- Lignes de front (2009) as Marchand
- My Afternoons with Margueritte (2010) as Jojo
- Happy Few (2010) as Le père de Rachel
- Itinéraire bis (2011) as Paoli
- The Silence of Joan (2011) as Le moine
- Une folle envie (2011) as Malo Le Guellec
- Let My People Go! (2011) as Nathan
- Le Premier Homme (2011) as Le fermier
- De force (2011) as Greg Leduc
- Sister (2012) as Le chef-cuisinier
- Despre oameni si melci (2012) as Robert
- Comme un lion (2012) as L'agent français
- Amitiés sincères (2013) as Vincent Brassac
- Une histoire d'amour (2013) as Le psychanalyste
- Le Renard jaune (2013) as Inspecteur Giraud
- Bright Days Ahead (2013) as Roger
- Le Dernier Diamant (2014) as Albert
- The Forbidden Room (2015) as The Doctor
- Mad Love (2015) as Le curé de Mantaille
- Mirage d'amour avec fanfare (2016) as Alexandre
- Seances (2016)
- The Young One (2016) as Capitaine Firmin Paillet
- In Safe Hands (2018)
- Lost Illusions (2021)
