= Marcel Bozonnet =

French actor (born 1944)

Marcel-Louis Bozonnet (French: [maʁsɛl bɔzɔnɛ]; born 18 May 1944, in Semur-en-Auxois), is a French actor.

Bozonnet entered the Comédie-Française in 1982, and became a "sociétaire" in 1986. He subsequently directed the Conservatoire national supérieur d'art dramatique de Paris from 1993 to 2001.

Appointed administrateur général of the Comédie-Française in 2001, il opened the salle Richelieu to contemporary authors (creating a poay of Valère Novarina in 2006), created a notable show on the Fables of Jean de La Fontaine produced by Bob Wilson, and recruited the first black member of the Théâtre Français (Bakary Sangaré).

Nonetheless, certain of his productions did not convince the critics, such as Le Tartuffe (which he produced himself), and Le Cid (El Cid) in 2006.

In 2006, he was at the centre of a row after he discontinued the production of a play by Peter Handke Voyage au pays sonore ou l'Art de la question, which was under negotiation in 2007. Handke, an Austrian playwright, had attended the burial of the reviled Serbian leader Slobodan Milosevic and had made a speech there denying the events of the Yugoslav war. It was for this reason that Bozonnet withdrew support for showing Handke's play. Renaud Donnedieu de Vabres, the French minister of culture, implicitly criticized Bozonnet's action in a letter addressed to Bozonnet, and by deciding to invite Handke to the ministry.

Despite hoping for another term as administrator of the Comédie-Française, his directorship was not renewed, and Muriel Mayette took over on 4 August 2006.
