= Bertrand Van Effenterre =

French film director

- Born: 2 March 1946 (age 80); Paris, France
- Occupations: Film director, screenwriter, film producer
- Years active: 1971–2014

Bertrand Van Effenterre (born 2 March 1946) is a French film director, screenwriter and producer. His film Tumultes was screened in the Un Certain Regard section at the 1990 Cannes Film Festival.

== Filmography ==
Year	Title	Role	Notes
1971	Perverse et docile	Assistant director	
1973	Le retour d'Afrique	Assistant director	
1974	Erica Minor	Director, writer, Producer, Costume designer & Production designer	
1974	My Little Loves	Assistant director	
1976	Duelle	Assistant director	
1976	Noroît	Assistant director	
1977	Une sale histoire	Assistant director	Documentary
1979	Mais ou et donc Ornicar	Director, writer & Producer	
1982	Contes modernes: A propos du travail	Actor	TV movie
1982	Contes modernes: A propos du travail	Actor	TV movie
1983	Le bâtard	Director & writer	
1983	Biquefarre	Producer	Documentary
1984	Côté coeur, côté jardin	Director, writer & Producer	
1986	Double messieurs	Producer & Production manager	
1987	A Man in Love	Production manager	
1989	American Stories, Food, Family and Philosophy	Executive producer	
1990	Tumultes	Director, writer & Producer	
1990	Lacenaire	Actor	
1992	Maigret	Director & writer	TV series (2 episodes)
1993	Poisson-lune	Director & writer	
1993	François Truffaut: Stolen Portraits	Executive producer	Documentary
1995	Une femme dans la tempête	Director	TV movie
1996	Madame le proviseur	Director & writer	TV series (1 episode)
1996–97	Madame le consul	Director, writer & Editor	TV series (2 episodes)
1996–98	L'histoire du samedi	Director & writer	TV series (2 episodes)
1998	Terminale	Actor	
2002	Le pont de l'aigle	Director & writer	TV movie
2003	Lô	Producer	Short
2004	Tout pour l'oseille	Director, writer & Producer	
2004	A Common Thread	Producer	
2004	Les Cordier, juge et flic	Director	TV series (1 episode)
2005–06	Commissaire Cordier	Director	TV series (2 episodes)
2006–07	Sauveur Giordano	Director	TV series (3 episodes)
2007	Paris enquêtes criminelles	Director	TV series (4 episodes)
2009–10	Sœur Thérèse.com	Director	TV series (2 episodes)
2012	Quand les poules auront des dents	Director	TV movie
2014	La clef des champs	Director	TV movie
