= Jean-Henri Roger =

French film director

- Born: 24 January 1949; Marseille, France
- Died: 31 December 2012 (aged 63)
- Occupations: Film director, screenwriter, actor
- Years active: 1970-2006

Jean-Henri Roger (24 January 1949 – 31 December 2012) was a French film director, screenwriter and actor. He co-directed with Juliet Berto the 1983 film Cap Canaille, which was entered into the 33rd Berlin International Film Festival.

== Selected filmography ==
- British Sounds (1969)
- Neige (1981)
- Cap Canaille (1983)
- Cavale (2003)
- Après la vie (2003)
