= Juliet Berto =

French actress, director and screenwriter

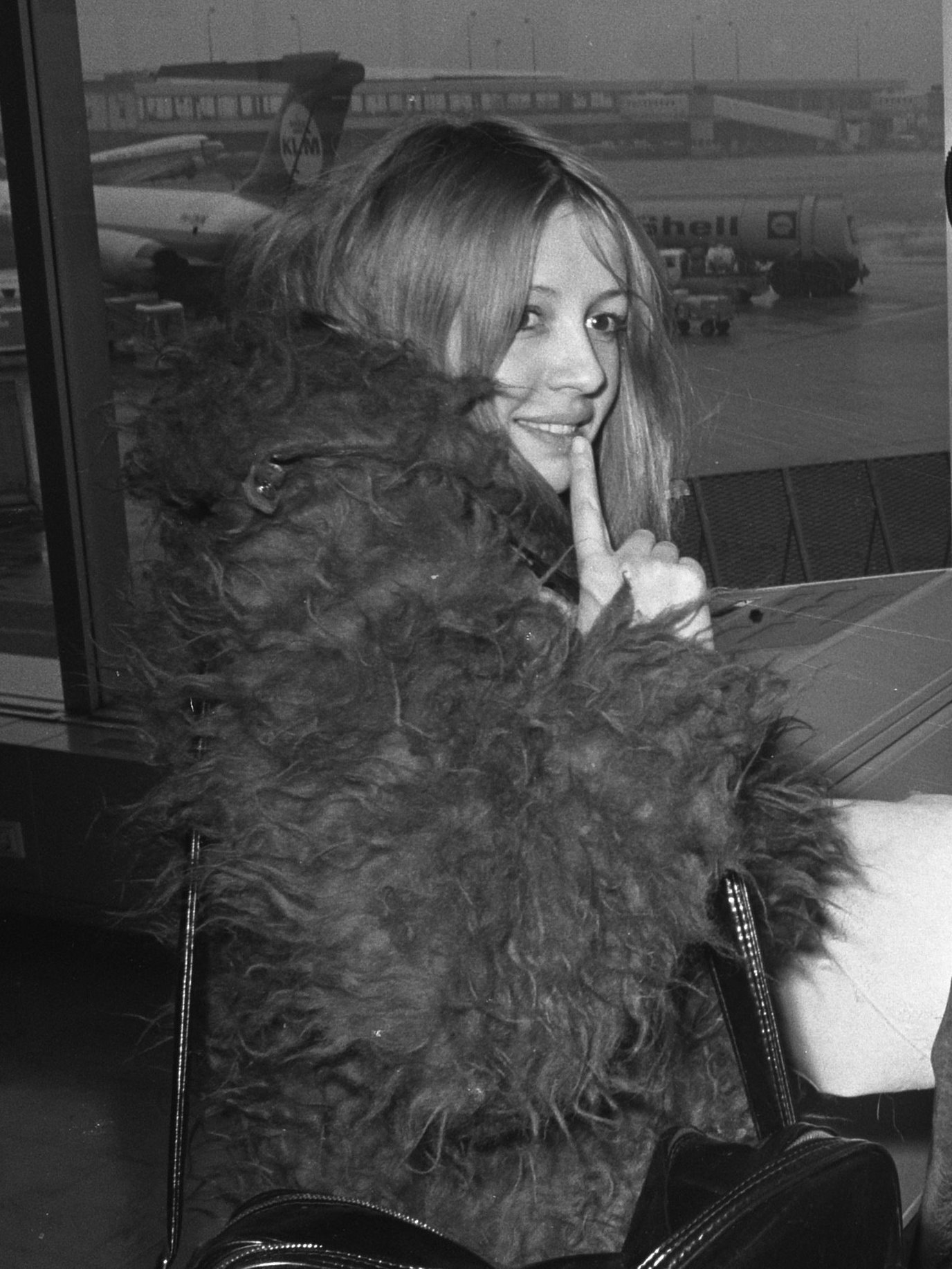
- Berto in 1972
- Born: Annie Lucienne Marie Louise Jamet; 16 January 1947; Grenoble, France
- Died: 10 January 1990 (aged 42); Breux-Jouy, France
- Occupations: Actress, film director, screenwriter
- Years active: 1967–1988

Juliet Berto (16 January 1947 – 10 January 1990), born Annie Jamet, was a French actress, director and screenwriter.

A member of the same loose group of student radicals as Anne Wiazemsky, she first appeared in Jean-Luc Godard's Two or Three Things I Know About Her, and would go on to appear in many of Godard's subsequent films, including La Chinoise, Week End, Le Gai Savoir, and Vladimir et Rosa. She later became a muse for the French New Wave director Jacques Rivette, starring in Out 1 and Celine and Julie Go Boating.

In the 1980s, she became a screenwriter and film director. Jean Douchet wrote that her work as a director was "vibrant, tense, rebellious, and passionate, yet full of joy and humour." Her film Cap Canaille (1983) was entered into the 33rd Berlin International Film Festival. In 1987, she was a member of the jury at the 37th Berlin International Film Festival. She died from breast cancer at age 42.

== Partial filmography ==
=== As actor ===
- 2 or 3 Things I Know About Her (1967) - girl talking to Robert
- La Chinoise (1967) - Yvonne
- Weekend (1967) - FLSO activist / young bourgeoise in auto accident (uncredited)
- Wheel of Ashes (1968) - girl playing pinball
- Ciné-girl (1969) - Régine
- Détruisez-vous (1969)
- Joy of Learning (1969) - Patricia Lumumba
- Slogan (1969) - assistant of Serge / secretary
- Je, tu, elles... (1969) - woman who buys men from a catalogue
- Camarades (1970) - Juliette
- L'escadron Volapük (1970) - Marguerite, waitress
- Un été sauvage (1970) - Sylvie
- L'araignée d'eau (1970)
- Vladimir and Rosa (1971) - Juliet / weatherwoman / hippie (uncredited)
- La Cavale (1971) - Annick Damien
- La cavale (1971) - Annick Damien
- Out 1 (1971) - Frederique
- Sex-shop (1972) - Isabelle
- Les caïds (1972) - Célia Murelli
- Out 1: Spectre (1972) - Frederique
- Les petits enfants d'Attila (1972) - nun (uncredited)
- Le retour d'Afrique (1973) - Juliet
- Défense de savoir (1973) - Juliette Cristiani
- Erica Minor (1974) - Claude
- Le protecteur (1974) - Nathalie Malakian
- Summer Run (1974)
- Celine and Julie Go Boating (1974) - Celine
- The Middle of the World (1974) - Juliette
- Le mâle du siècle (1975) - Isabelle
- Claro (1975)
- Mr. Klein (1976) - Jeanine
- Duelle (1976) - Leni
- The Moving Picture Man (1977)
- L'Argent des Autres (1978) - Arlette Rivière
- Roberte (1979) - Petit F
- Bastien Bastienne (1979) - Catherine
- Destins parallèles (1979)
- Guns (1980) - Margot
- Neige (1981) - Anita
- Conversa Acabada (1981) - Helena
- Cap Canaille (1983) - Paula Baretto
- Family Life (1985) - Mara
- Adolescente, sucre d'amour (1985) - Juliette
- Un amour à Paris (1987) - Mona
- Hôtel du Paradis (1987) - prostitute
- Papillon du vertige (1987) - Clarisse

=== As director ===
- Babar Basses'mother (1974; short)
- Neige (1981; co-directed with Jean-Henri Roger)
- Cap Canaille (1983; co-directed with Jean-Henri Roger)
- Havre (1986)
- Damia : concert en velours noir (1989; documentary)
