= Adélaïde de La Rochefoucauld =

French courtier

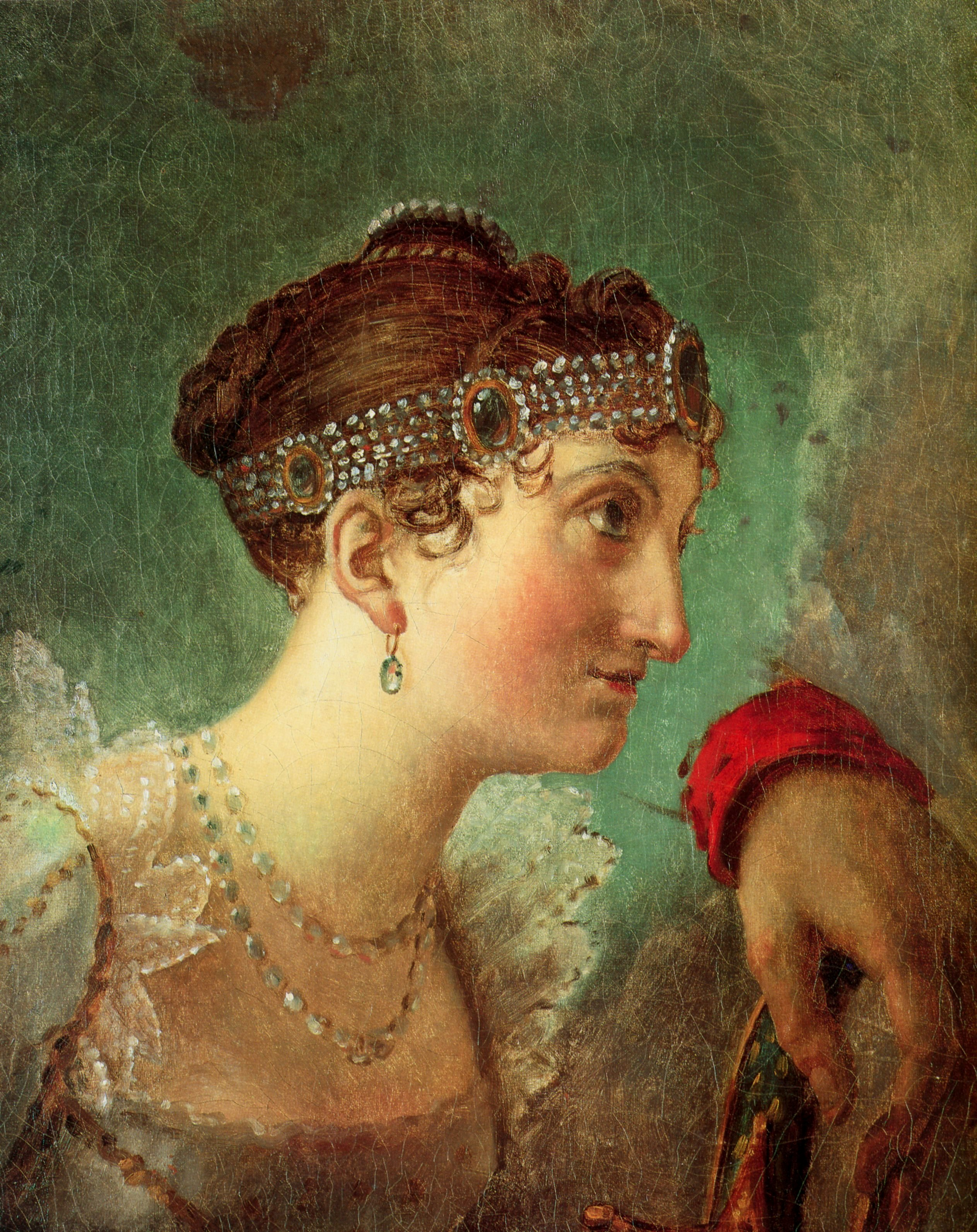
- Born: Adélaïde de Pyvart de Chastullé; 1769; Paris
- Died: 1814 (aged 44–45)
- Spouses: Alexandre, comte de La Rochefoucauld
- Issue: Alexandre Jules de La Rochefoucauld; Adèle de La Rochefoucauld
- Father: François Marie Louis Pyvart de Chastullé, Comte de Chastullé
- Mother: Marie Madeleine de Laffilard
- Occupation: Première dame d'honneur to Joséphine de Beauharnais

Adélaïde de La Rochefoucauld (née de Pyvart de Chastullé; 1769–1814), was a French courtier. She served as the principal lady in waiting, or dame d'honneur (Mistress of the Robes), to Empress Joséphine in 1804–09.

== Life ==
She was born in Paris as the heiress of a rich plantation owner from Saint Domingue. Her father was allied to the Beauharnais family, and she married Alexandre-François of La Rochefoucauld (1767–1841), in Paris on 9 June 1788. She had three sons and one daughter. Her daughter later married Francesco Borghese, a brother-in-law of Pauline Bonaparte, Princess Borghese. She had reportedly been an acquaintance of Josephine since before she became an empress. She was imprisoned during the Terror of Robespierre and had met Josephine soon after they had both been released from prison.

In 1804, when Napoleon made himself Emperor and his wife Empress of France, he created an Imperial court and had ladies-in-waiting appointed to empress Josephine. de La Rochefoucauld was appointed to the position of dame d'honneur to the empress Josephine, which was the highest rank of all ladies-in-waiting, over ranking the dame d'atours, Émilie de Beauharnais, and the dame du palais: Jeanne Charlotte du Lucay, Madame de Rémusat, Elisabeth Baude de Talhouët, Lauriston, d'Arberg, Marie Antoinette Duchâtel, Sophie de Segur, Séran, Colbert, Savary and Aglaé Louise Auguié Ney.

As dame d'honneur it was her task to supervise the ladies-in-waiting, organize the household of the empress, decide about the visits, invitations and presentations. She was described as highly efficient in her task.

Described as a haughty grande dame and as an ancien regime royalist she is said to have cowed the emperor in to silence at times. Napoleon disliked her and called her "a little cripple, as stupid as she is ugly". According to Laure Junot, she never actually enjoyed her position and had to be persuaded by Josephine to accept it. It is noted that she preferred not to use her apartment her position entitled her to at the Imperial palace.

When Josephine was divorced from Napoleon in January 1810, Adélaïde de La Rochefoucauld applied to the emperor to be allowed to continue in her position as dame d'honneur for the next empress, Marie Louise of Austria. Napoleon was however shocked by her request, regarded it as disloyalty toward Josephine, and asked Josephine to dismiss her. She was replaced as the dame d'honneur of Josephine by one of the dames de palais, d'Arenberg, while the post of dame d'honneur of empress Marie Louise went to the Duchess of Montebello.

Her descendants include the Dukes of Estissac and the Princes de La Rochefoucauld -Montbel (Dominique and his son Gabriel).

Court offices
Preceded by Geneviève d'Ossun	Première dame d'honneur 1804–1809	Succeeded by Louise Antoinette Lannes, Duchess of Montebello
