= Joséphine de Beauharnais =

Empress of the French from 1804 to 1810

- Viscountess of Beauharnais; Duchess of Navarre
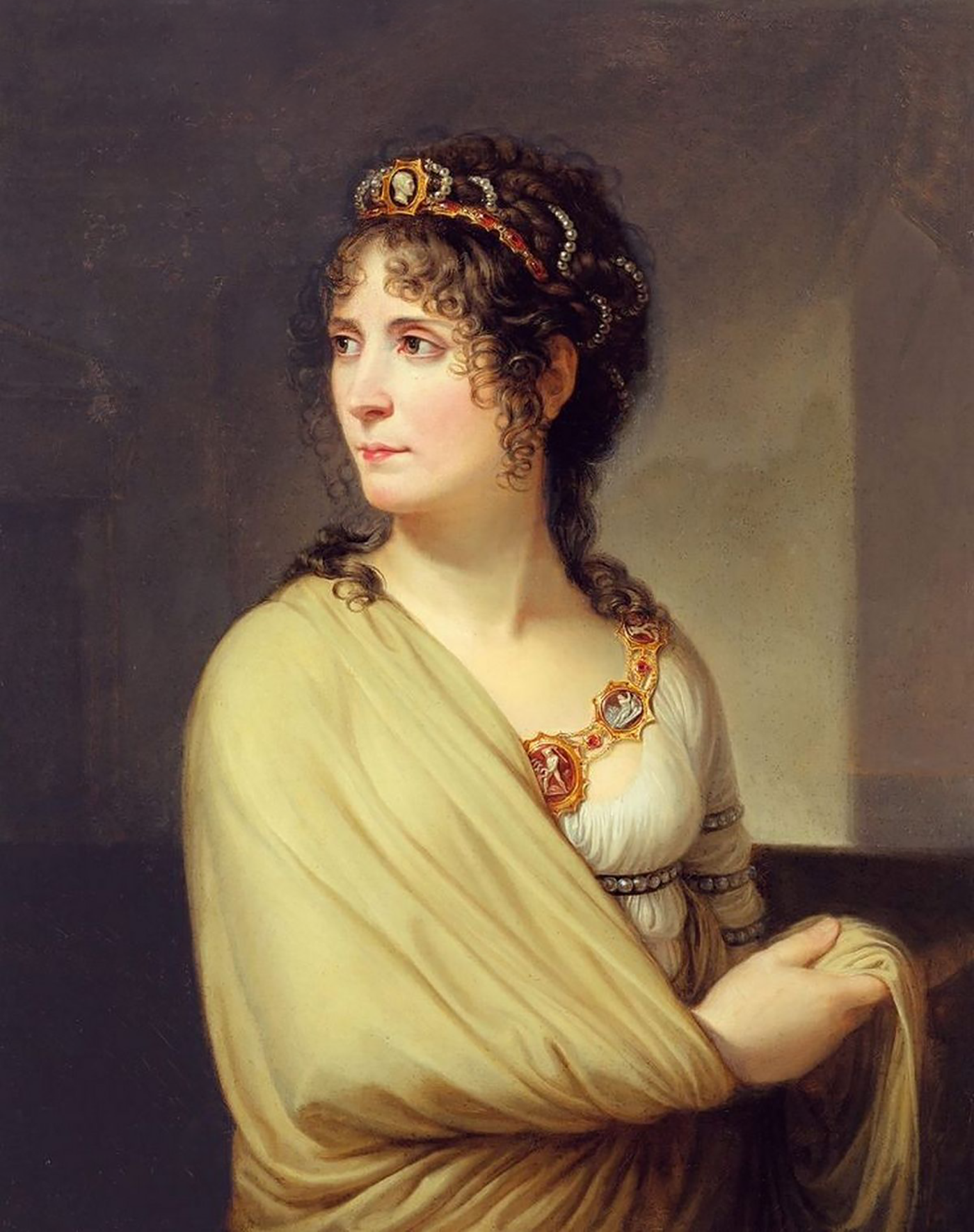

Empress consort of the French
- Tenure: 18 May 1804 – 10 January 1810
- Coronation: 2 December 1804

Queen consort of Italy
- Tenure: 23 May 1805 – 10 January 1810
- Born: Marie Josèphe Rose Tascher de La Pagerie; 23 June 1763; Les Trois-Îlets, Martinique
- Died: 29 May 1814 (aged 50); Rueil-Malmaison, France
- Burial: Church of Saint-Pierre-Saint-Paul
- Spouses: Alexandre, Viscount of Beauharnais (m. 1779; died 1794) Napoleon I (m. 1796; ann. 1810)
- Issue: Eugène de Beauharnais, Duke of Leuchtenberg; Hortense de Beauharnais, Queen of Holland
- House: Tascher de La Pagerie
- Father: Joseph Gaspard Tascher de La Pagerie
- Mother: Rose Claire des Vergers de Sannois

Joséphine Bonaparte (French: [ʒozefin bɔnapaʁt], born Marie Josèphe Rose Tascher de La Pagerie; 23 June 1763 – 29 May 1814) was Empress of the French as the first wife of Emperor Napoleon I from 18 May 1804 until their marriage was annulled on 10 January 1810. As Napoleon's consort, she was also Queen of Italy from 26 May 1805 until the 1810 annulment. She is widely known as Joséphine de Beauharnais (French: [ʒozefin də boaʁnɛ]) or Empress Joséphine.

Joséphine's marriage to Napoleon was her second. Her first husband, Alexandre de Beauharnais, was guillotined during the Reign of Terror, and she was imprisoned in the Carmes prison until five days after his execution. Through her children by Beauharnais, she was the grandmother of Emperor Napoleon III of France and Empress Amélie of Brazil. Members of the current royal families of Sweden, Denmark, Belgium, and Norway and the grand ducal family of Luxembourg also descend from her. Because she did not bear Napoleon any children, he had their marriage annulled and married Marie Louise of Austria. Joséphine was the recipient of numerous love letters written by Napoleon, many of which still exist.

A patron of art, Joséphine worked closely with sculptors, painters and interior decorators to establish a unique Consular and empire style at the Château de Malmaison. She became one of the leading collectors of different forms of art of her time, such as sculpture and painting. The Château de Malmaison was noted for its rose garden, which she supervised closely.

== Name ==
Although she is often referred to as "Joséphine de Beauharnais", it is not a name she herself used. "Beauharnais" is the name of her first husband, which she ceased to use upon her marriage to Napoleon, taking the last name "Bonaparte". Her full first names were Marie-Josèphe-Rose. She did not use the name "Joséphine" before meeting Napoleon, who was the first to call her such. Before she met Napoleon, she went by the name of Rose, or Marie-Rose Tascher de la Pagerie, later de Beauharnais. She sometimes reverted to using her maiden name in later life. After her marriage to then-General Bonaparte, she adopted the name Joséphine Bonaparte. The misnomer "Joséphine de Beauharnais" emerged during the restoration of the Bourbons, who were hesitant to refer to her by either Napoleon's surname or her imperial title.

== Family background ==
Coat of arms of Tascher de La Pagerie family

The Taschers were an ancient French noble family of landed gentry, and Joséphine's grandfather, Gaspard-Joseph Tascher de La Pagerie, was the first to settle in Le Carbet on Martinique in 1726. He seems to have lived in poverty there, but secured a position for his son, Joseph-Gaspard Tascher de La Pagerie, as a page in the household of the Dauphine of France, Maria Josepha of Saxony.

After spending three years from 1752 in France, Joseph-Gaspard returned to Martinique and married on 9 November 1761 Marie Rose-Claire des Vergers de Sannois, whose maternal grandfather, Anthony Brown, may have been Irish. Rose-Claire was from one of the oldest European families on the island, and the Tascher family home near Les Trois-Îlets, a sugar plantation, which is now a museum, was part of her dowry.

On Martinique, Joseph-Gaspard had an income as a plantation owner and as a lieutenant of the Troupes de marine, and also a small pension for his previous work in the French royal household. He was almost always close to bankruptcy and suffered from ill health.

== Disputed birthplace ==
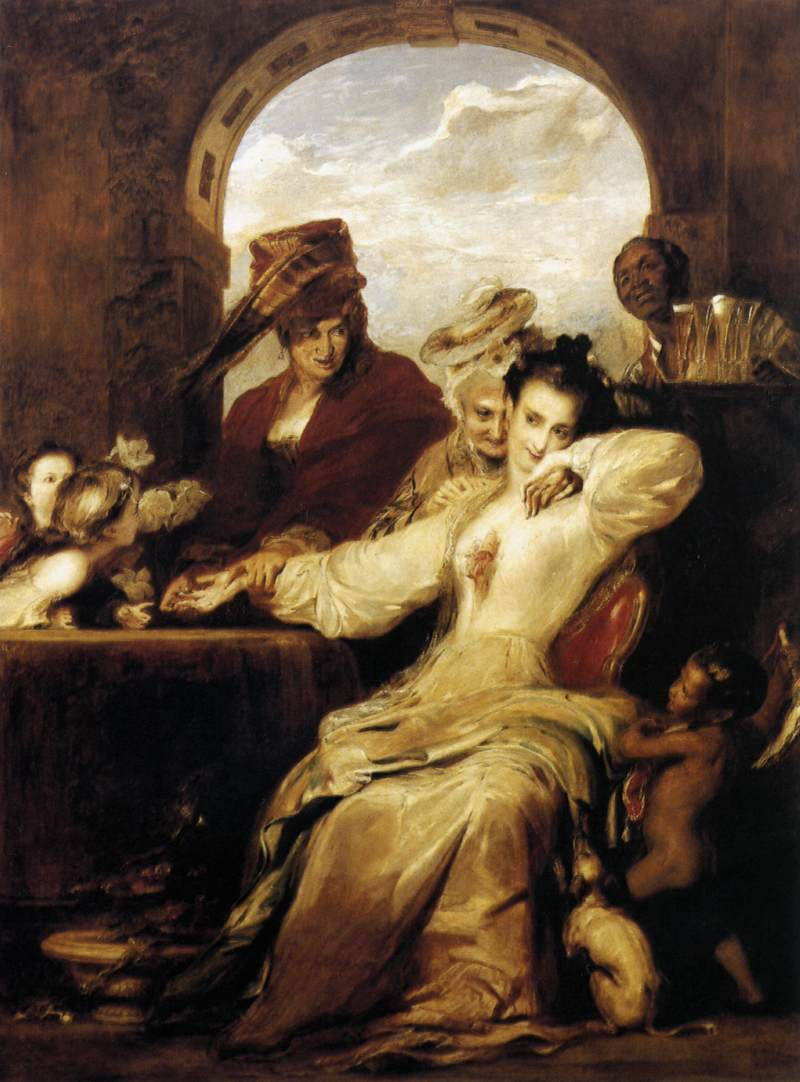
Josephine and the Fortune-Teller by David Wilkie, 1837

Marie-Josèphe-Rose Tascher de La Pagerie was born in Paix Bouche, Babonneau, Saint Lucia on 23 June 1763. The church registry in Les Trois-Îlets, Martinique states that Joséphine was baptised there by Emmanuel Capuchin but does not say she was born there.

Joséphine's father owned an estate in Soufrière District on Saint Lucia, called Malmaison, which later was also the name of her famous French residence. In 1802, Dom Daviot, parish priest in Gros Islet on Saint Lucia, wrote a letter to one of his friends, stating that "it is in the vicinity of [my] parish that the wife of the first consul was born". He asserted that he was well acquainted with Joséphine's cousin, his parishioner.

In Henry H. Breen's 1844 The History of St. Lucia, he stated that he had met with "several well-informed persons" who were convinced that Empress Joséphine had been born there. Breen presented some evidence for this, including a newspaper clipping from 1831 which said that it was "alleged" that the de Taschers were among the first settlers of Saint Lucia, and that the future empress was born on a small estate on a hill then called La Cauzette, and later known as Morne Paix Bouche. According to this story, the family lived there until 1771, when the father went to serve as intendant of Martinique. Some people even claimed to have been among Joséphine's playmates, and one of them said that he had been "graciously received" by the empress in Château de Malmaison outside Paris. Breen received further confirmation from Joséphine's enslaved nanny, Dede, who said that she nursed Joséphine at La Cauzette.

According to those who believe that Joséphine was born on Saint Lucia, the de Tascher estate in Martinique was only a pied-à-terre, occasional lodging, for when they wanted to stay with his mother-in-law. Saint Lucia switched hands between Great Britain and France fourteen times, and there were no civil registers on the island when Joséphine was born. Saint Lucia's frequent change of ownership between Britain and France could be seen as the reason her birthplace was left out of her birth record, as it would have affected her nationality.

Regardless of where she was born, Joséphine was her parents' first child, and they had two more: Catherine-Désirée in 1764 and Marie-Françoise in 1766. At the ages of ten and nine, Joséphine and Catherine-Désirée were sent to a boarding school in Fort-Royal, run by the Bénédictines de la Providence. There, they learned to read, write, sing, dance, and embroider for four years. After the death of Catherine-Désirée, Joséphine returned to her parents' plantation. Joséphine's nurse was an enslaved person called Marion, whose freedom she would secure in 1807.

== First marriage ==
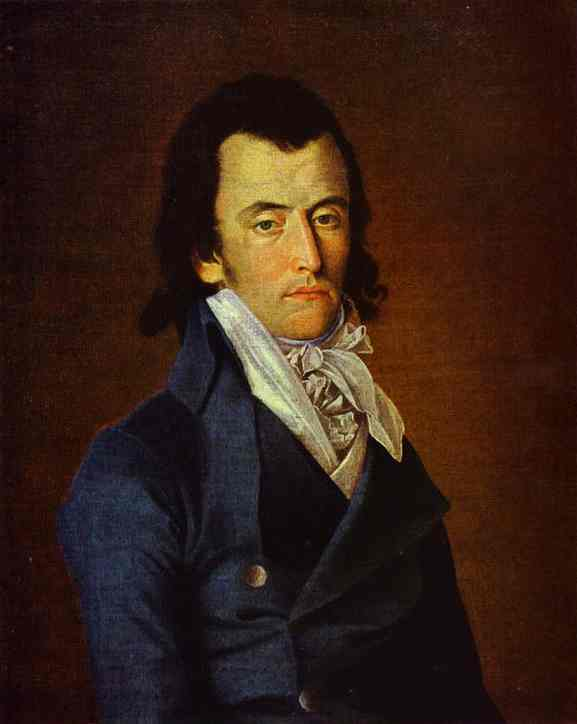
Alexandre-Francois-Marie, Vicomte de Beauharnais by a painter of David's circle (c. 1793)

Joséphine's paternal aunt, Marie Euphémie Désirée Tascher de la Pagerie (1739–1803), was at first the mistress, later became the second wife of a French naval officer, François de Beauharnais, Governor of Martinique, who came from a less ancient but richer noble Beauharnais family. While living on Martinique, de Beauharnais had a son, Alexandre, and his first wife, Marie Anne Henriette Françoise Pyvart de Chastullé (1722–1766). Soon, the parents returned to France, and left the infant with the Tascher family until 1766. When he had come of age, his father's mistress, who was also Alexandre's godmother, decided that it would be advantageous to her if he married one of her nieces. Aged seventeen, he judged fifteen-year-old Joséphine to be too close to him in age, and thus, Catherine-Désirée Tascher de la Pagerie (1764–1777) was chosen for him. As the bride's father was impoverished and the bridegroom was to become a wealthy man upon his marriage, he asked for no dowry.

By the time Alexandre's father had proposed in a letter, Catherine-Désirée had died in 1777. Not wanting to lose the rich suitor, her father offered his youngest daughter instead, which was accepted by Alexandre. Marie-Françoise was not yet twelve, however, and her mother and grandmother were not willing to let her go. In the end, Joséphine was engaged to Alexandre.

In October 1779, she went to France with her father. She married Alexandre on 13 December 1779, in Noisy-le-Grand. They had two children: a son, Eugène de Beauharnais, and a daughter, Hortense de Beauharnais (who later married Napoleon's brother Louis Bonaparte in 1802). Alexandre assumed legal paternity of Hortense, but when Joséphine announced him the birth he wrote her that he knew for certain that baby was the result of adultery. Joséphine and Alexandre's marriage was not a happy one. Alexandre abandoned his family for over a year to live with a mistress and frequented brothels, leading to a court-ordered separation during which Joséphine and the children lived at Alexandre's expense in the Pentemont Abbey.

On 2 March 1794, during the Reign of Terror, the Committee of Public Safety ordered the arrest of her husband. He was jailed in the Carmes Prison in Paris. Considering Joséphine as being too close to the counter-revolutionary financial circles, the Committee ordered her arrest on 18 April 1794. A warrant of arrest was issued against her on 21 April 1794, and she was imprisoned in the Carmes Prison until 28 July. During this time, Joséphine was only allowed to communicate with her children by their scrawls on the laundry list, which the jailers soon prohibited.

Her husband was accused of having poorly defended Mainz in July 1793, and being considered an aristocratic suspect, was sentenced to death and guillotined with his cousin Augustin on 23 July 1794, on the Place de la Révolution (later Place de la Concorde) in Paris. Joséphine was freed five days later, thanks to the Fall of Maximilien Robespierre, which ended the Reign of Terror. On 27 July 1794 Tallien arranged the liberation of Thérèse Cabarrus, and soon after that of Joséphine. In June 1795, a new law allowed her to recover the possessions of Alexandre.

== Marriage to Napoleon ==
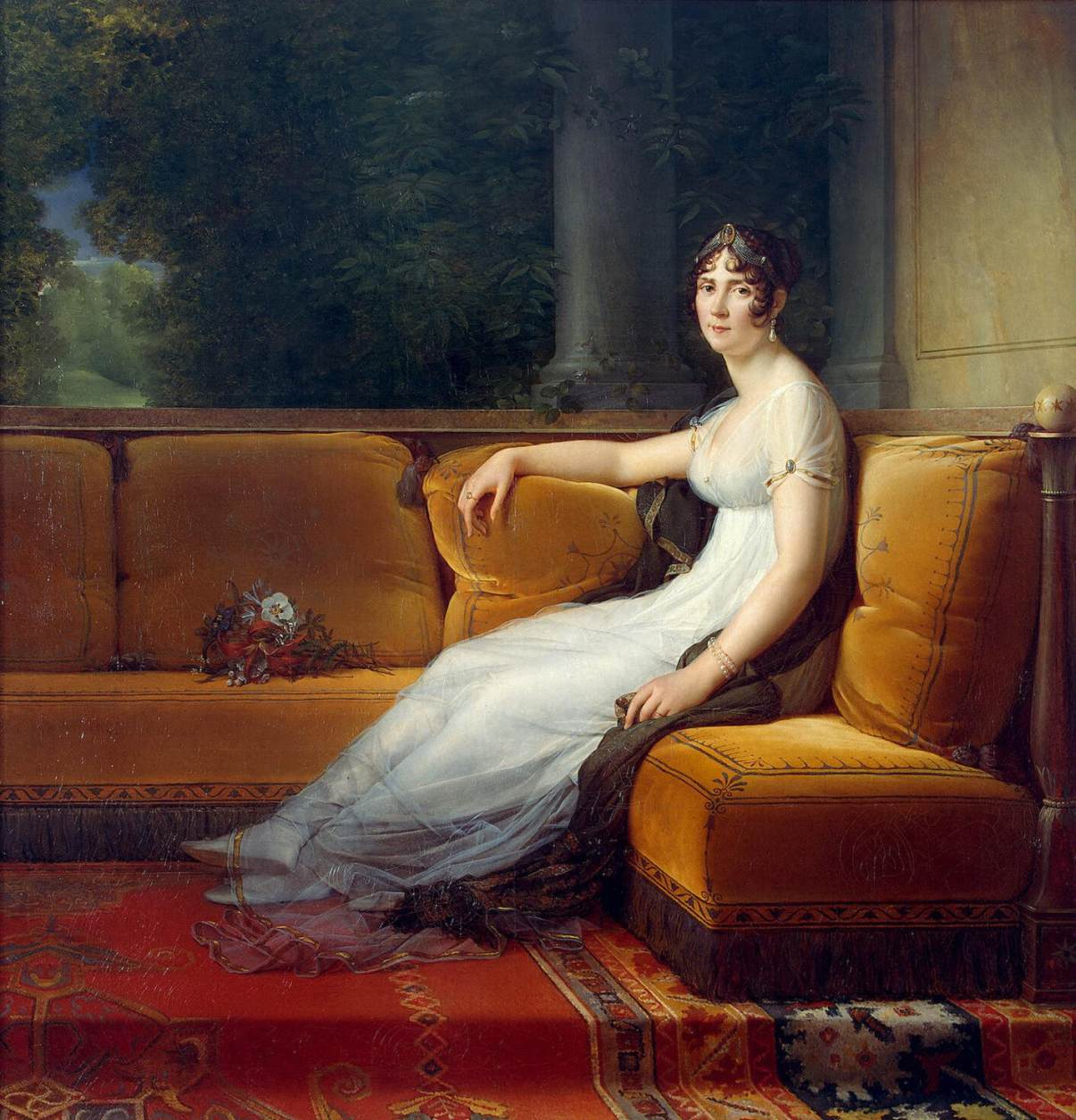
Joséphine de Beauharnais at the château de Malmaison. 1801. By François Gérard.

Madame de Beauharnais had affairs with several leading political figures, including Paul Barras. In 1795, she met Napoleon Bonaparte, six years her junior, and became his mistress. In a letter to her in December, he wrote, "I awake full of you. Your image and the memory of last night's intoxicating pleasures has left no rest to my senses." In January 1796, Napoleon proposed to her and they were married on 9 March. On the marriage certificate, Joséphine reduced her age by 4 years and increased Napoleon's by 18 months, making the newly-weds appear to be roughly the same age. Until meeting Bonaparte, she was known as Rose, but Bonaparte preferred to call her Joséphine, the name she adopted from then on.

The marriage was not well received by Napoleon's family, who were shocked that he had married an older widow with two children. His mother and sisters were especially resentful of Joséphine, as they felt clumsy and unsophisticated in her presence.

Joséphine, left behind in Paris, in 1796 began an affair with a Hussar lieutenant, Hippolyte Charles. Rumors of the affair reached Napoleon; he was infuriated, and his love for her changed entirely.

Napoleon frequently wrote passionate letters to her from Italy, begging her to join him in Milan after he occupied the city on 10 May 1796. Under significant pressure, Joséphine finally agreed to travel to Italy and arrived in Milan on 10 July 1796, and Hippolyte was part of her entourage. She stayed in Italy for the next 18 months, based primarily in Milan and later at the nearby Château de Mombello, where she was joined by Napoleon's family.

Two days after the wedding, Bonaparte left Paris to lead the Army of Italy. During their separation, he sent her many love letters. In February 1797, he wrote: "You to whom nature has given spirit, sweetness, and beauty, you who alone can move and rule my heart, you who know all too well the absolute empire you exercise over it!"

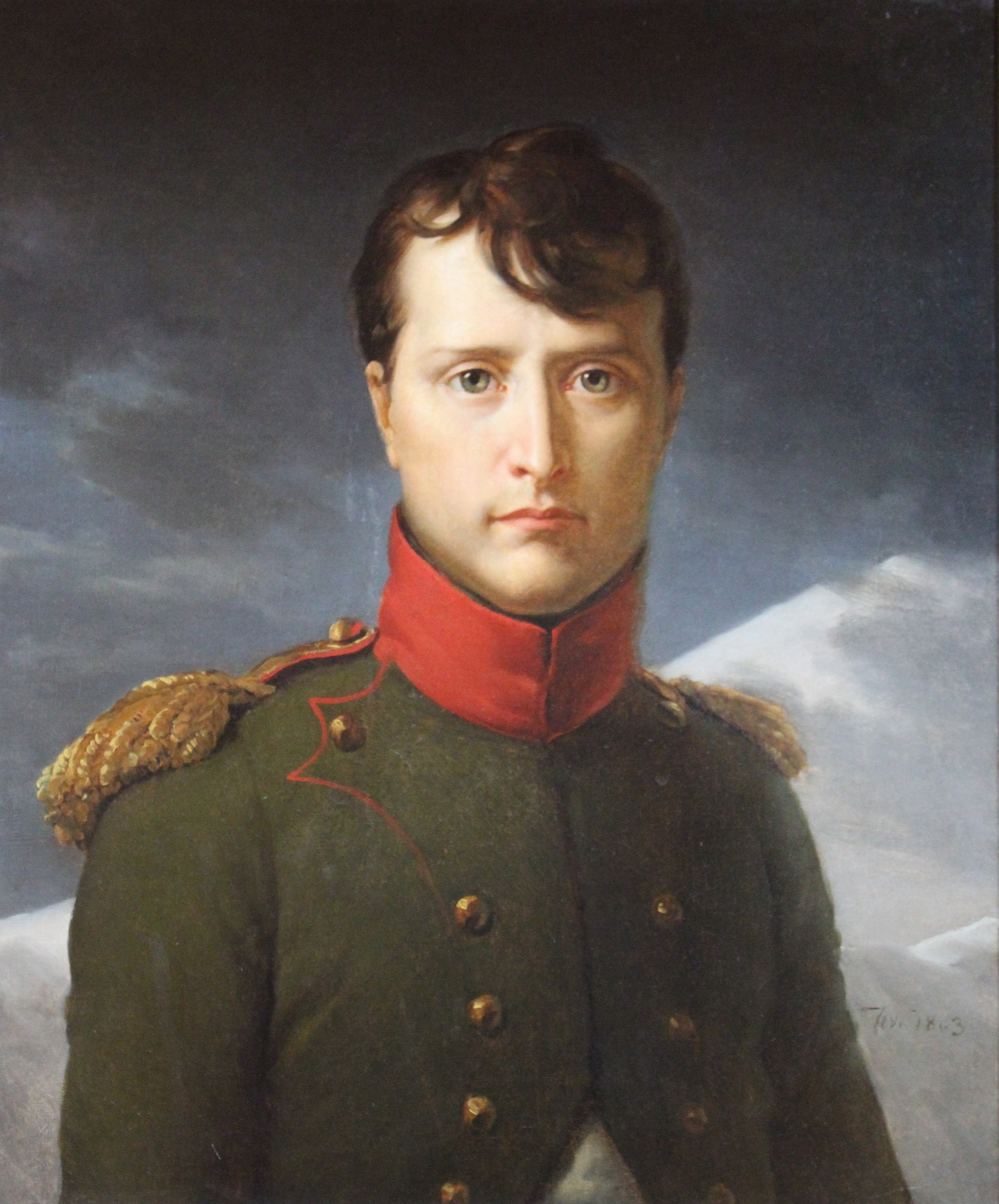
Napoléon Bonaparte as first Consul. By François Gérard. 1803.

In 1798, Napoleon led a French army to Egypt. During this campaign, Napoleon started an affair of his own with Pauline Fourès, the wife of a junior officer, who became known as "Napoleon's Cleopatra." The relationship between Joséphine and Napoleon was never the same after this.

In December 1800, Joséphine was nearly killed in the Plot of the rue Saint-Nicaise, an attempt on Napoleon's life with a bomb planted in a parked cart. On 24 December, she and Napoleon went to see a performance of Joseph Haydn's Creation at the Opéra, accompanied by several friends and family. The party travelled in two carriages. Joséphine was in the second, with her daughter, Hortense; her pregnant sister-in-law, Caroline Murat; and General Jean Rapp. Joséphine had delayed the party while getting a new silk shawl draped correctly, and Napoleon went ahead in the first carriage. The bomb exploded as her carriage was passing. The bomb killed several bystanders and one of the carriage horses, and blew out the carriage's windows; Hortense was struck in the hand by flying glass. There were no other injuries and the party proceeded to the Opéra.

=== Empress of the French ===
Napoleon was elected Emperor of the French in 1804, making Joséphine empress. The coronation ceremony, officiated by Pope Pius VII, took place at Notre-Dame de Paris, on 2 December. Napoleon first crowned himself, then put the crown on Joséphine's head, proclaiming her empress. This showed his rejection of the clergy as the power of Europe.

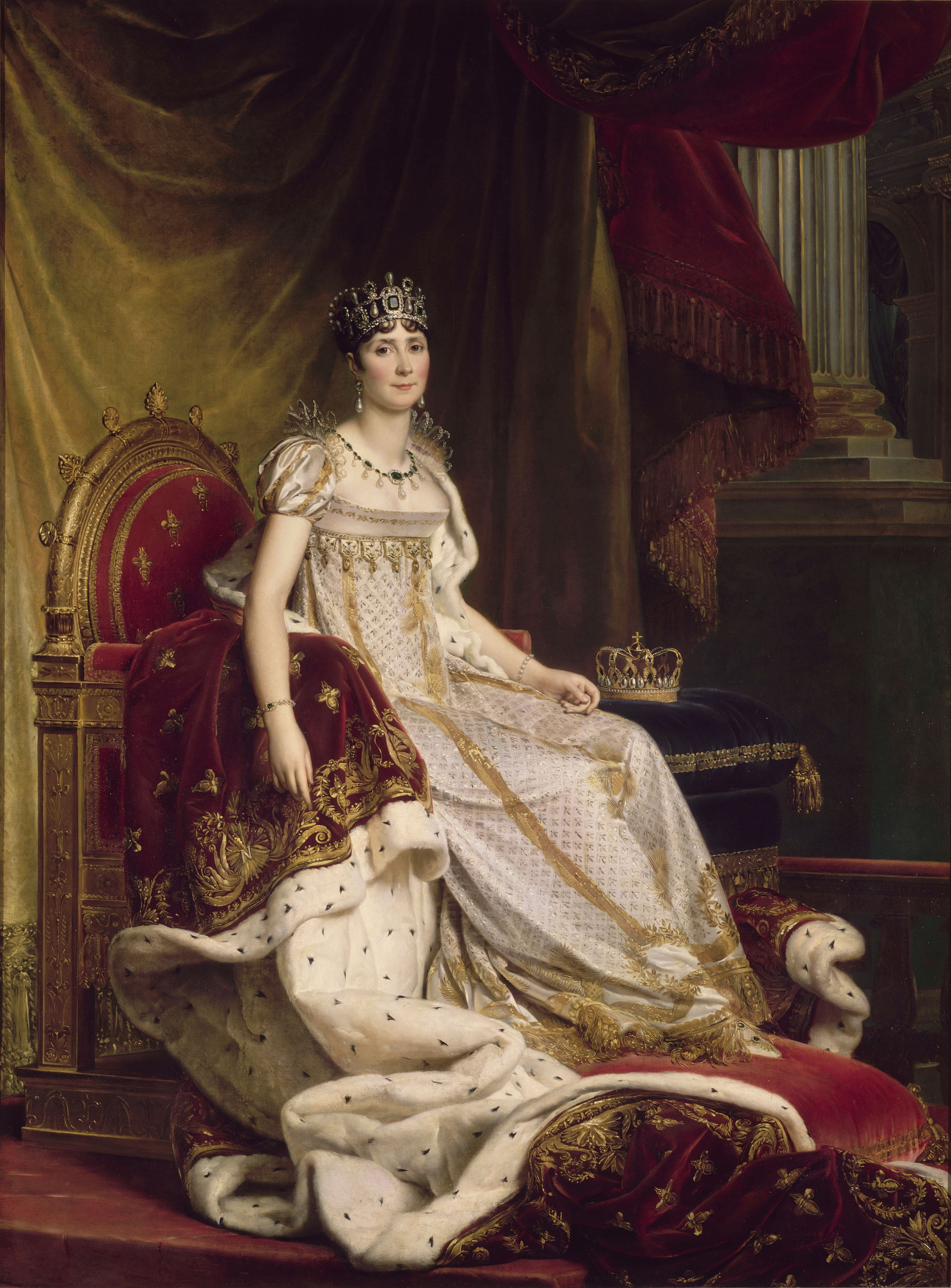
Empress Josephine in coronation costume in 1807–1808 by François Gérard

In her role as empress, Josephine had a court appointed to her and reinstated the offices which composed the household of the queen before the French revolution, with Adélaïde de La Rochefoucauld as Première dame d'honneur, Émilie de Beauharnais as Dame d'atour, and the wives of his own officials and generals, Jeanne Charlotte du Lucay, Madame de Rémusat, Elisabeth Baude de Talhouët, Lauriston, d'Arberg, Marie Antoinette Duchâtel, Sophie de Segur, Séran, Colbert, Savary and Aglaé Louise Auguié Ney, as Dame de Palais.

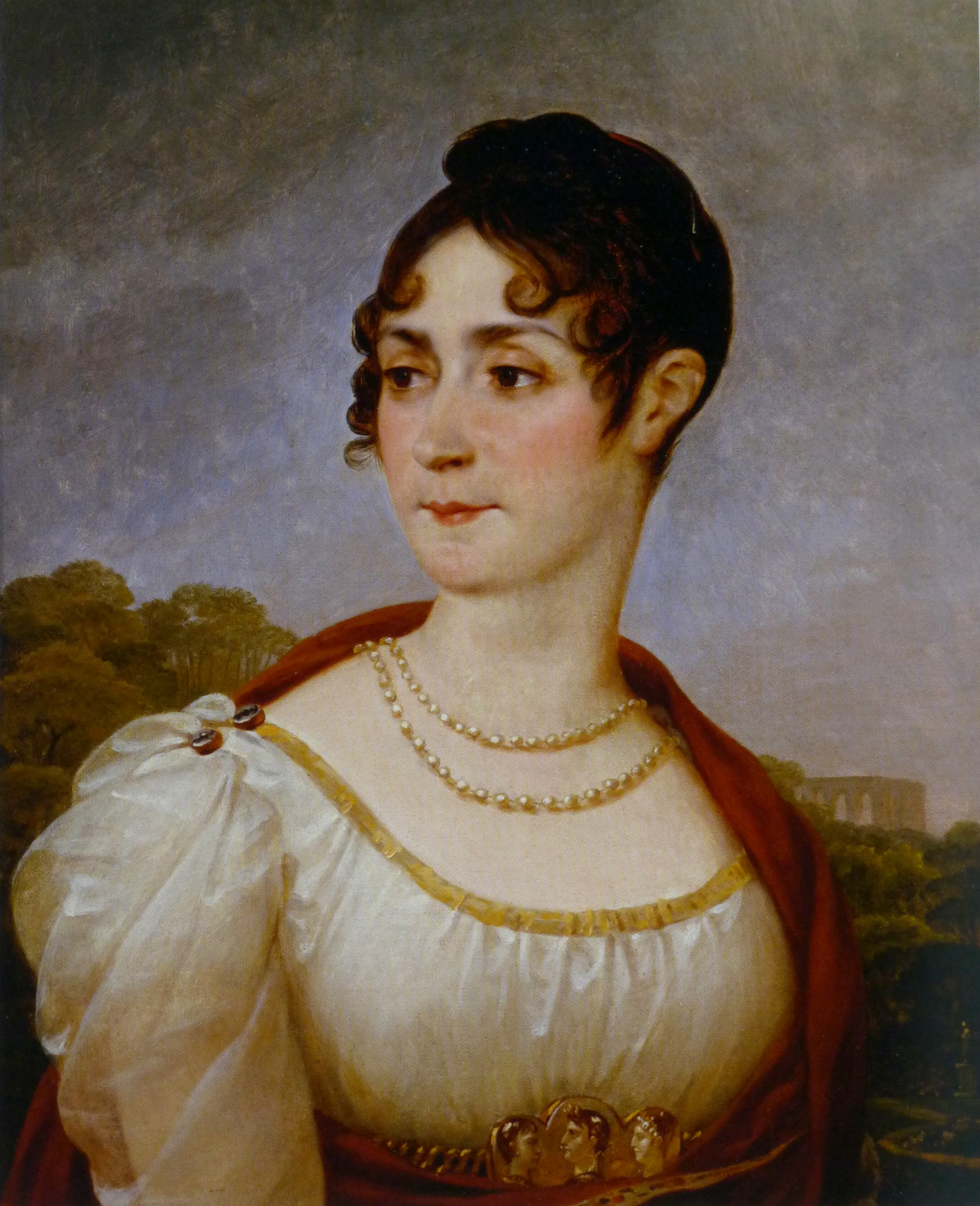
Portrait of Joséphine, c. 1809 by Antoine-Jean Gros

Shortly before their coronation, there was an incident at the Château de Saint-Cloud that nearly sundered the marriage between the two. Joséphine caught Napoleon in the bedroom of her lady-in-waiting, Élisabeth de Vaudey, and Napoleon threatened to divorce her as she had not produced an heir since he felt pressured from his family to do so. Eventually, however, through the efforts of her daughter Hortense, the two were reconciled.

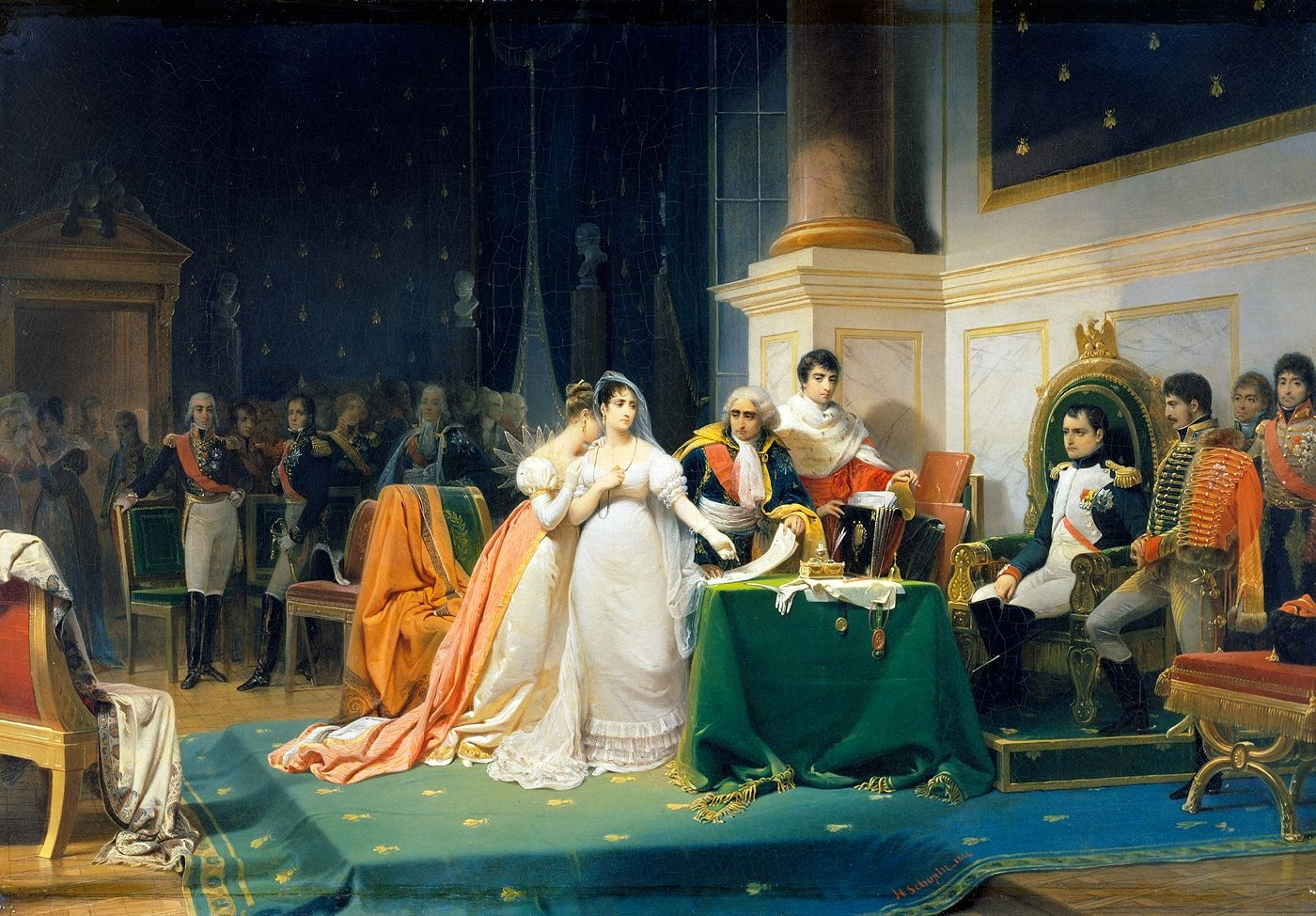
The Divorce of the Empress Josephine by Henri Frédéric Schopin, 1846

When after a few years it became clear she could not have a child, Napoleon, while still loving Joséphine, began to think about the possibility of an annulment. The final die was cast when Napoleon's nephew (and Joséphine's grandson) Napoléon-Charles Bonaparte, who had been declared his heir, died of croup in 1807. Once again requested by Napoleon's family, he began to create lists of eligible princesses. At dinner on 30 November 1809, he let Joséphine know that—in the interest of France—he must find a wife who could produce an heir. He let Joséphine know that this was his family's wish and that he wished it were not so. Joséphine agreed to the divorce so the Emperor could remarry in the hope of having an heir. The divorce ceremony took place on 10 January 1810 and was a grand but solemn social occasion, and each read a statement of devotion to the other. Napoleon marked the occasion by commissioning the Sèvres Egyptian Service for Joséphine as a divorce gift.

On 11 March, Napoleon married Marie-Louise of Austria by proxy; the formal ceremony took place at the Louvre in April. Napoleon once remarked that despite her quick infatuation with him, "It is a womb that I am marrying". Even after their separation, Joséphine retained the title and rank of empress.

== Later life and death ==
=== Duchess of Navarre ===
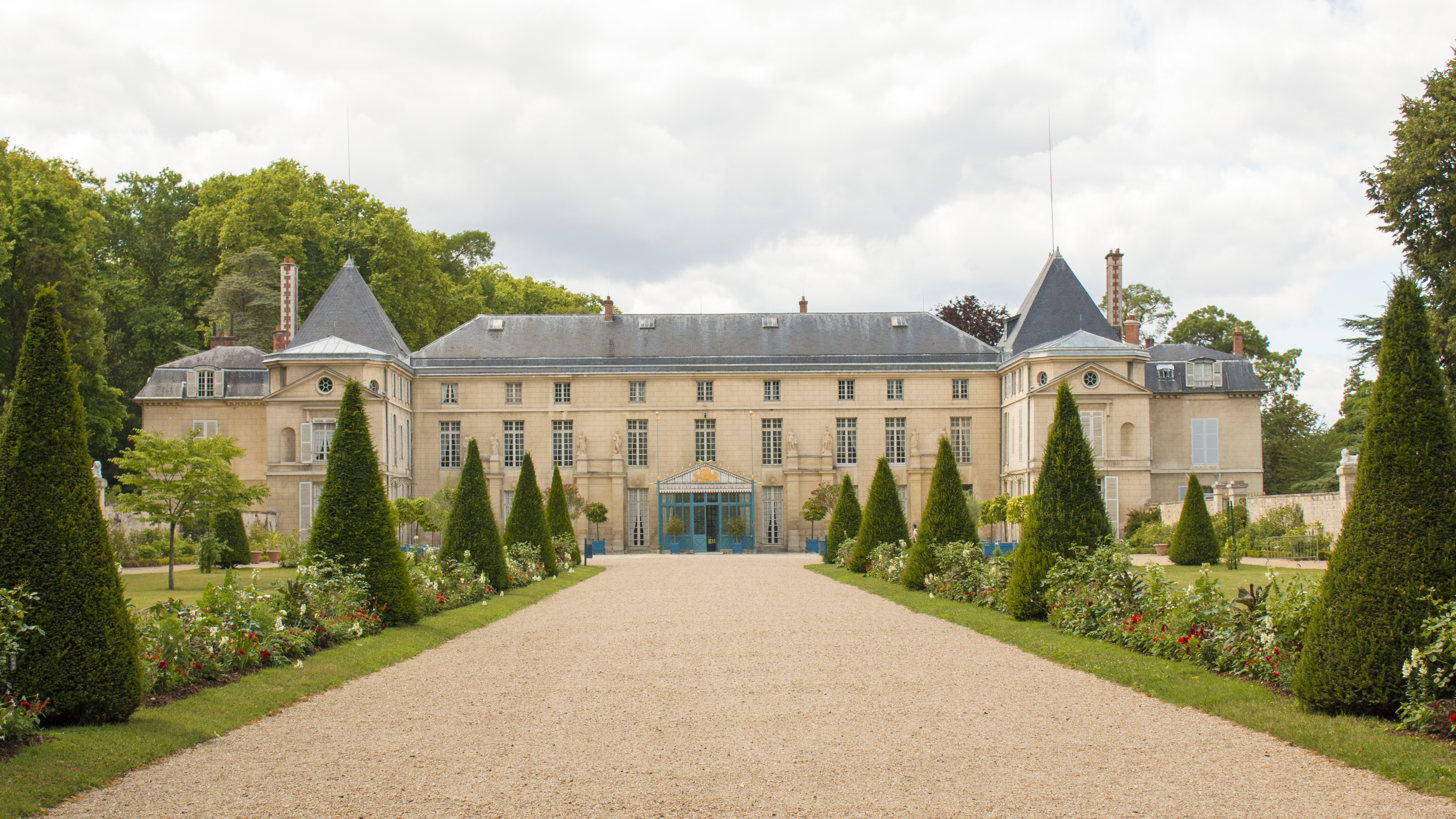
Château de Malmaison near Paris

After the annulment, Joséphine lived at the Château de Malmaison, near Paris. She remained on good terms with Napoleon, who provided her with a generous annual allowance and once said that the only thing to come between them was her debts. (Joséphine remarked privately, "The only thing that ever came between us was my debts; certainly not his manhood.") In April 1810, by letters patent, Napoleon created her Duchess of Navarre. Some claim Napoleon and Joséphine were still secretly in love, though it is impossible to verify this.

In March 1811, Marie Louise delivered a long-awaited heir, Napoleon II, to whom Napoleon gave the title "King of Rome".

=== Death ===
Joséphine died of pneumonia in Rueil-Malmaison on 29 May 1814, soon after walking with Emperor Alexander I of Russia in the gardens of Malmaison, where she allegedly begged to join Napoleon in exile. She was buried in the nearby church of Saint Pierre-Saint Paul in Rueil. Her daughter Hortense is interred near her.

Napoleon learned of her death via a French journal while in exile on Elba, and stayed locked in his room for two days, refusing to see anyone. He claimed to a friend, while in exile on Saint Helena, that "I truly loved my Joséphine, but I did not respect her." Despite numerous affairs, eventual marriage annulment, and his remarriage, the Emperor's last words on his death bed at St. Helena were (according to some accounts): "France, the Army, the Head of the Army, Joséphine." ("France, l'armée, tête d'armée, Joséphine").

== Descendants ==
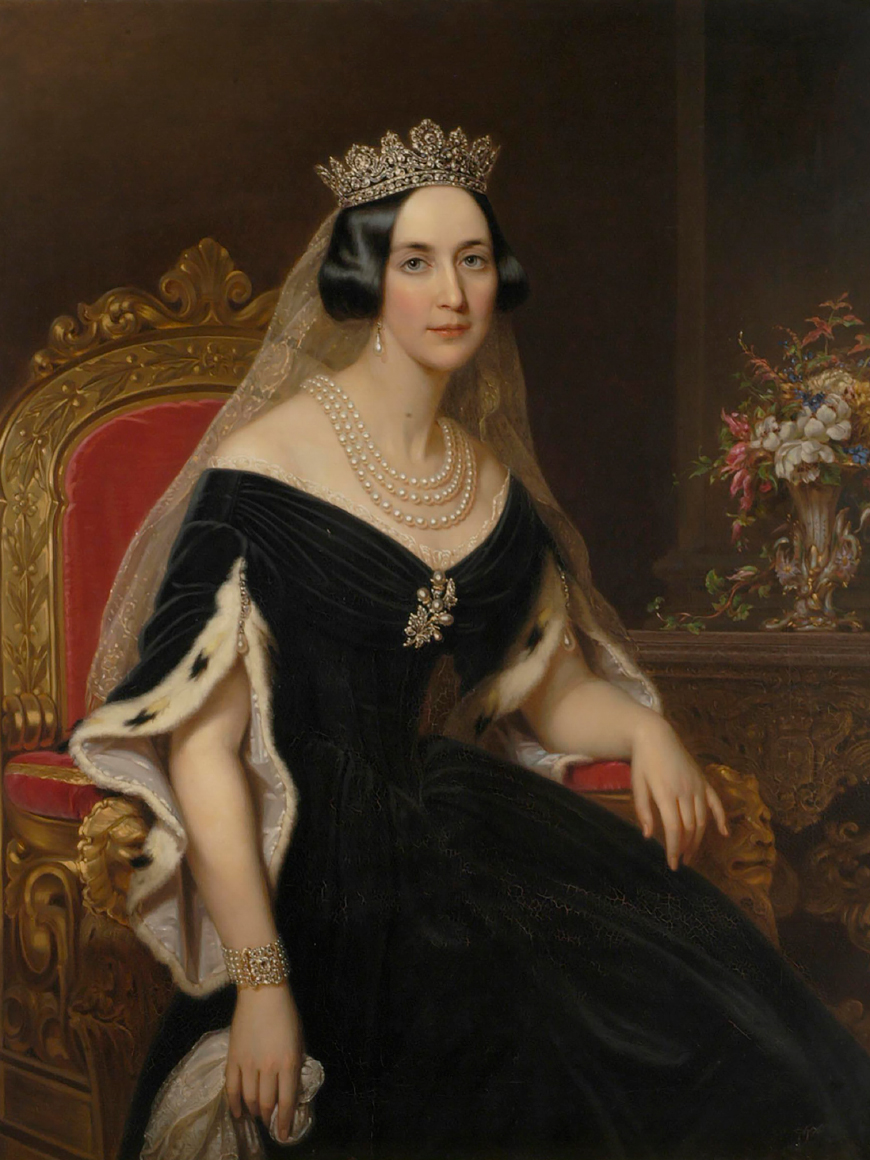
Joséphine's eldest granddaughter, Joséphine, Queen of Sweden and Norway. Portrait by Axel Nordgren

Hortense's son, Napoleon III, became Emperor of the French. Eugène's son Maximilian de Beauharnais, 3rd Duke of Leuchtenberg married into the Russian Imperial family, was granted the style of Imperial Highness and founded the Russian line of the Beauharnais family, while Eugene's daughter Joséphine married King Oscar I of Sweden, the son of Napoleon's one-time fiancée, Désirée Clary. Through her, Joséphine is a direct ancestor of the present heads of the royal houses of Belgium, Denmark, Luxembourg, Norway and Sweden and of the grandducal house of Baden.

A number of jewels worn by modern-day royals are said to have been worn by Joséphine. Through the Leuchtenberg inheritance, the Norwegian royal family possesses an emerald and diamond parure that have belonged to Joséphine. The briolette diamonds, that were inherited by her son Eugène, were passed through his son Maximilian's marriage to the Romanov family. They were made into an Empress Joséphine Tiara by Fabérge's master goldsmith August Holmström in late 1880's. The Swedish royal family owns several pieces of jewelry frequently linked to Joséphine, including the Leuchtenberg Sapphire Parure, a suite of amethyst jewels, given as wedding gift to her daughter-in-law Augusta Amalia, and the Cameo Parure, worn by Sweden's royal brides.

Another of Eugène's daughters, Amélie of Leuchtenberg, married Emperor Pedro I of Brazil in Rio de Janeiro, and became Empress of Brazil, and they had one surviving daughter, Princess Maria Amélia of Brazil. She was briefly engaged to Archduke Maximilian of Austria, before he became Maximilian I of Mexico, before her early death.

== Personality and appearance ==
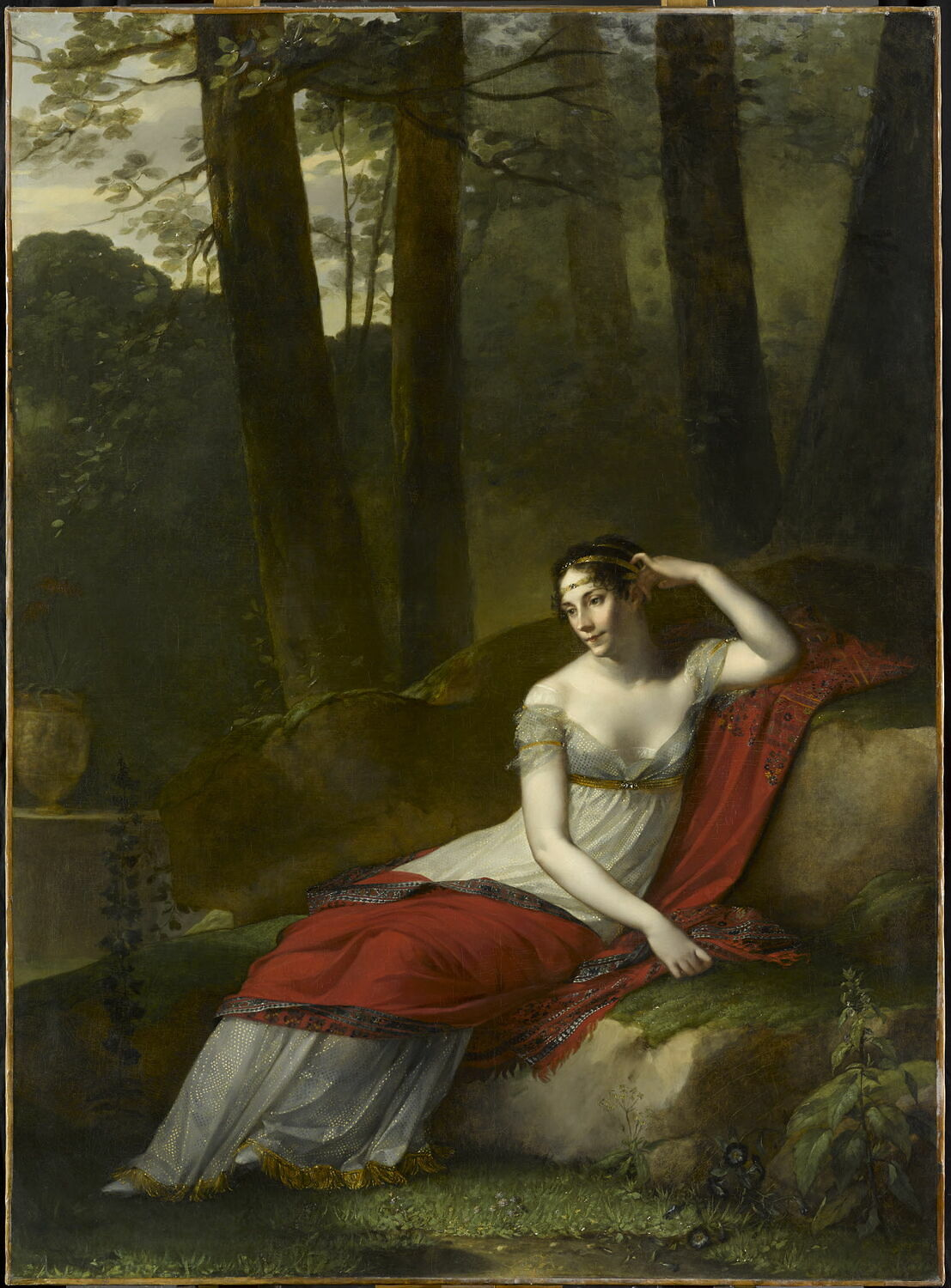
Josephine in 1805 by Pierre-Paul Prud'hon

Her biographer Carolly Erickson wrote, "In choosing her lovers [Joséphine] followed her head first, then her heart", meaning that she was adept in terms of identifying the men who were most capable of fulfilling her financial and social needs. She was aware of Napoleon's potential. Joséphine was a renowned spendthrift and Barras may have encouraged the relationship with General Bonaparte in order to get her off his hands. Joséphine was naturally full of kindness, generosity and charm, and was praised as an engaging hostess.

Joséphine was described as being of average height, svelte, and shapely, with silky, long, chestnut-brown hair, hazel eyes, and a rather sallow complexion. Her nose was small and straight, and her mouth was well-formed; however, she kept it closed most of the time to hide her bad teeth. She was praised for her elegance, style, and low, "silvery", beautifully modulated voice.

== Patroness of roses ==
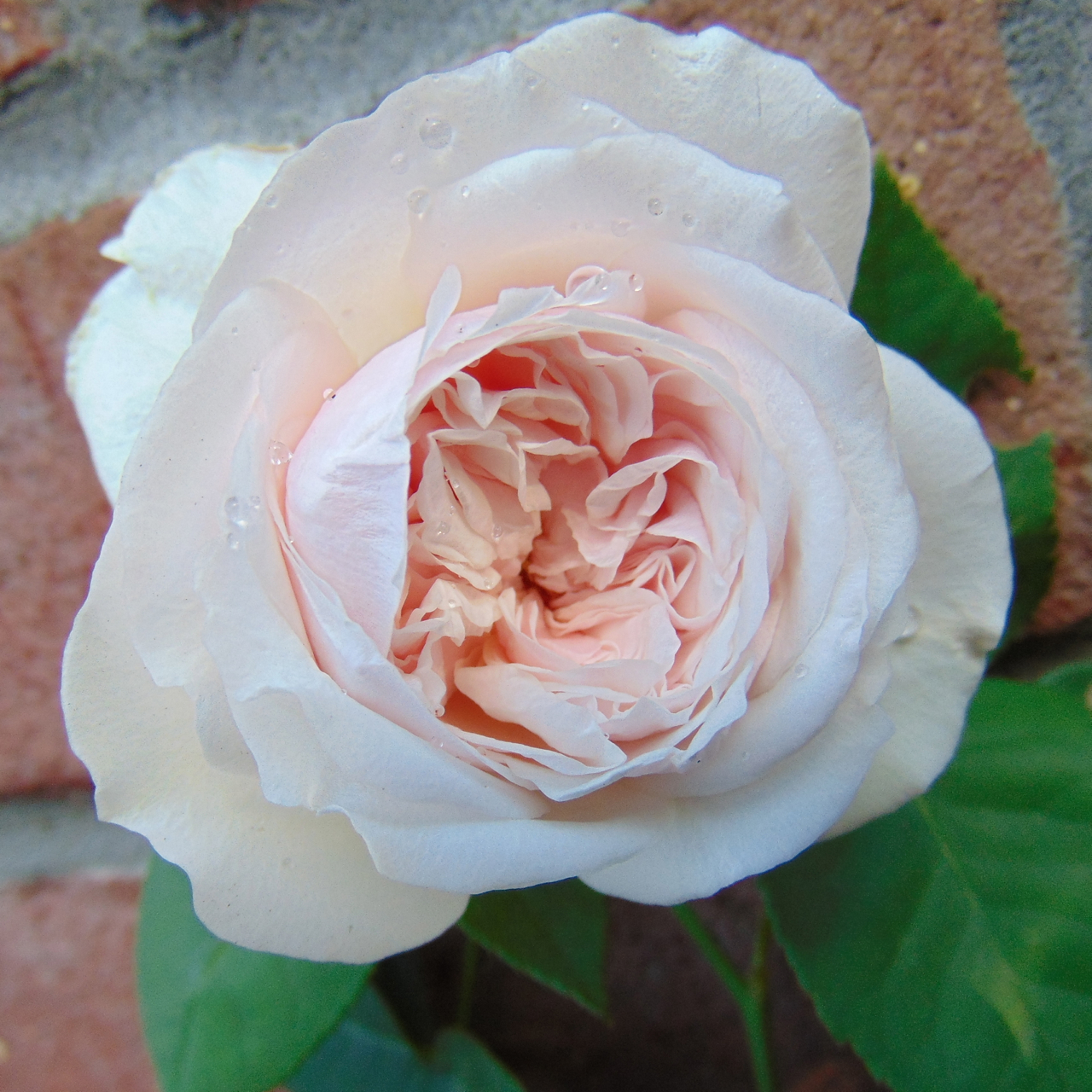
'Souvenir de la Malmaison'

In 1799 while Napoleon was in Egypt, Joséphine purchased the Chateau de Malmaison. She had it landscaped in an English style, hiring landscapers and horticulturalists from Britain. These included Thomas Blaikie, a Scottish horticultural expert, another Scottish gardener, Alexander Howatson, the botanist, Ventenat, and the horticulturist, André Dupont. The rose garden was begun soon after purchase; inspired by Dupont's love of roses. Joséphine took a personal interest in the gardens and the roses, and learned a great deal about botany and horticulture from her staff. Joséphine wanted to collect all known roses so Napoleon ordered his warship commanders to search all seized vessels for plants to be forwarded to Malmaison. Pierre-Joseph Redouté was commissioned by her to paint the flowers from her gardens. Les Roses was published 1817–20 with 168 plates of roses; 75–80 of the roses grew at Malmaison. The English nursery Lee and Kennedy was a major supplier, despite Britain and France being at war, his shipments were allowed to cross blockades. Specifically, when Hume's Blush Tea-Scented China was imported to England from China, the British and French Admiralties made arrangements in 1810 for specimens to cross naval blockades for Joséphine's garden. Sir Joseph Banks, Director of the Royal Botanic Gardens, Kew, also sent her roses.

The general assumption is that she had about 250 roses in her garden when she died in 1814. The roses were not catalogued during her tenure. There may have been only 197 rose varieties in existence in 1814, according to calculations by Jules Gravereaux of Roseraie de l'Haye. There were 12 species, about 40 centifolias, mosses and damasks, 20 Bengals, and about 100 gallicas. The botanist Claude Antoine Thory, who wrote the descriptions for Redouté's paintings in Les Roses, noted that Joséphine's Bengal rose R. indica had black spots on it. She produced the first written history of the cultivation of roses, and is believed to have hosted the first rose exhibition, in 1810.

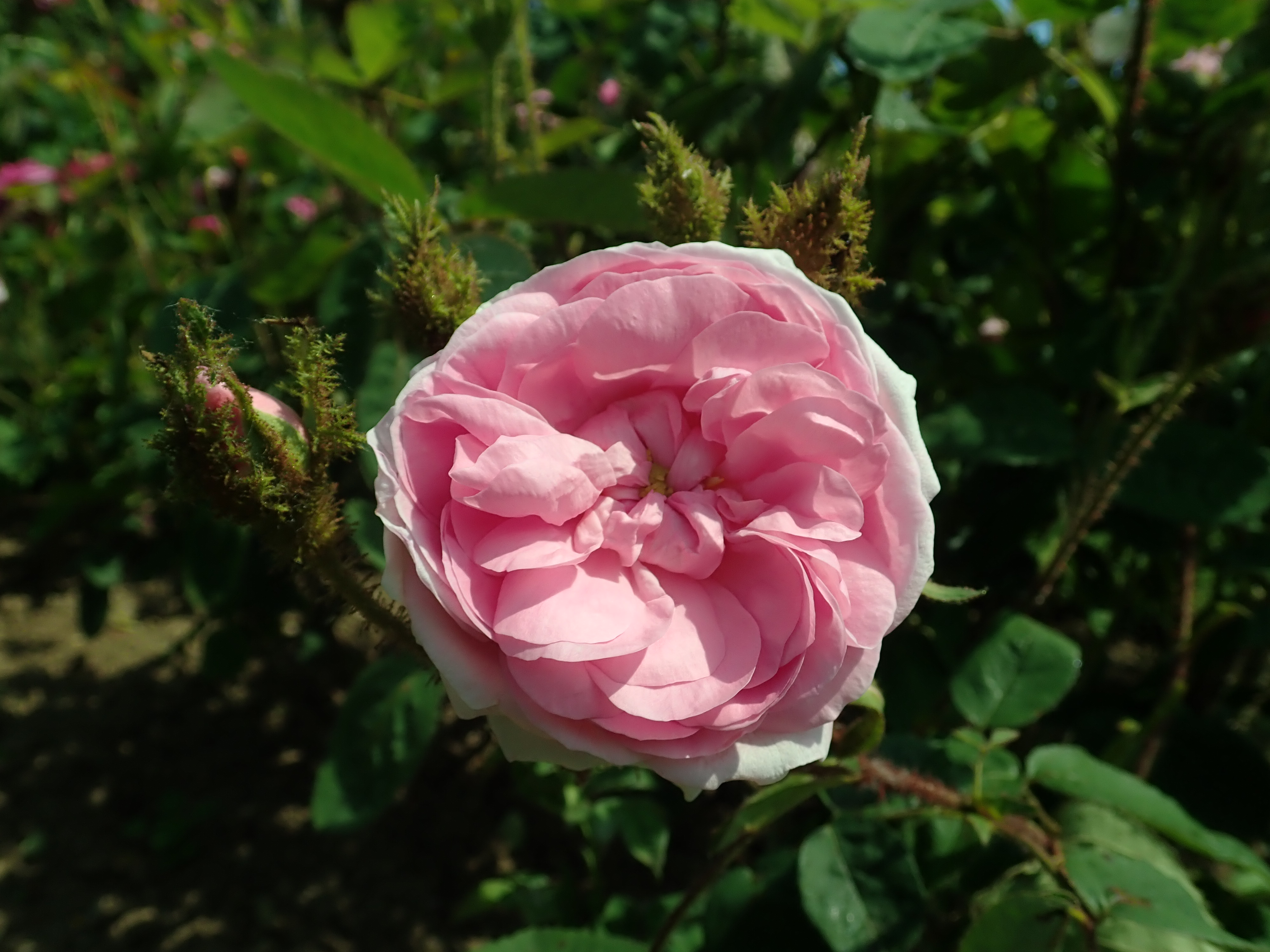
Rosa Joséphine de Beauharnais

Modern hybridization of roses through artificial, controlled pollination began with Joséphine's horticulturalist Andre Dupont. Prior to this, most new rose cultivars were spontaneous mutations or accidental, bee-induced hybrids, and appeared rarely. With controlled pollination, the appearance of new cultivars grew exponentially. Of the roughly 200 types of roses known to Joséphine, Dupont had created 25 while in her employ. Subsequent French hybridizers created over 1000 new rose cultivars in the 30 years following Joséphine's death. In 1910, less than 100 years after her death, there were about 8000 rose types in Gravereaux's garden. Bechtel also feels that the popularity of roses as garden plants was boosted by Joséphine's patronage. She was a popular ruler and fashionable people copied her.

Brenner and Scanniello call her the "Godmother of modern rosomaniacs" and attribute her with our modern style of vernacular cultivar names as opposed to Latinized, pseudo-scientific cultivar names. For instance, R. alba incarnata became "Cuisse de Nymphe Emue" in her garden. After Joséphine's death in 1814 the house was vacant at times, the garden and house ransacked and vandalised, and the garden's remains were destroyed in a battle in 1870.

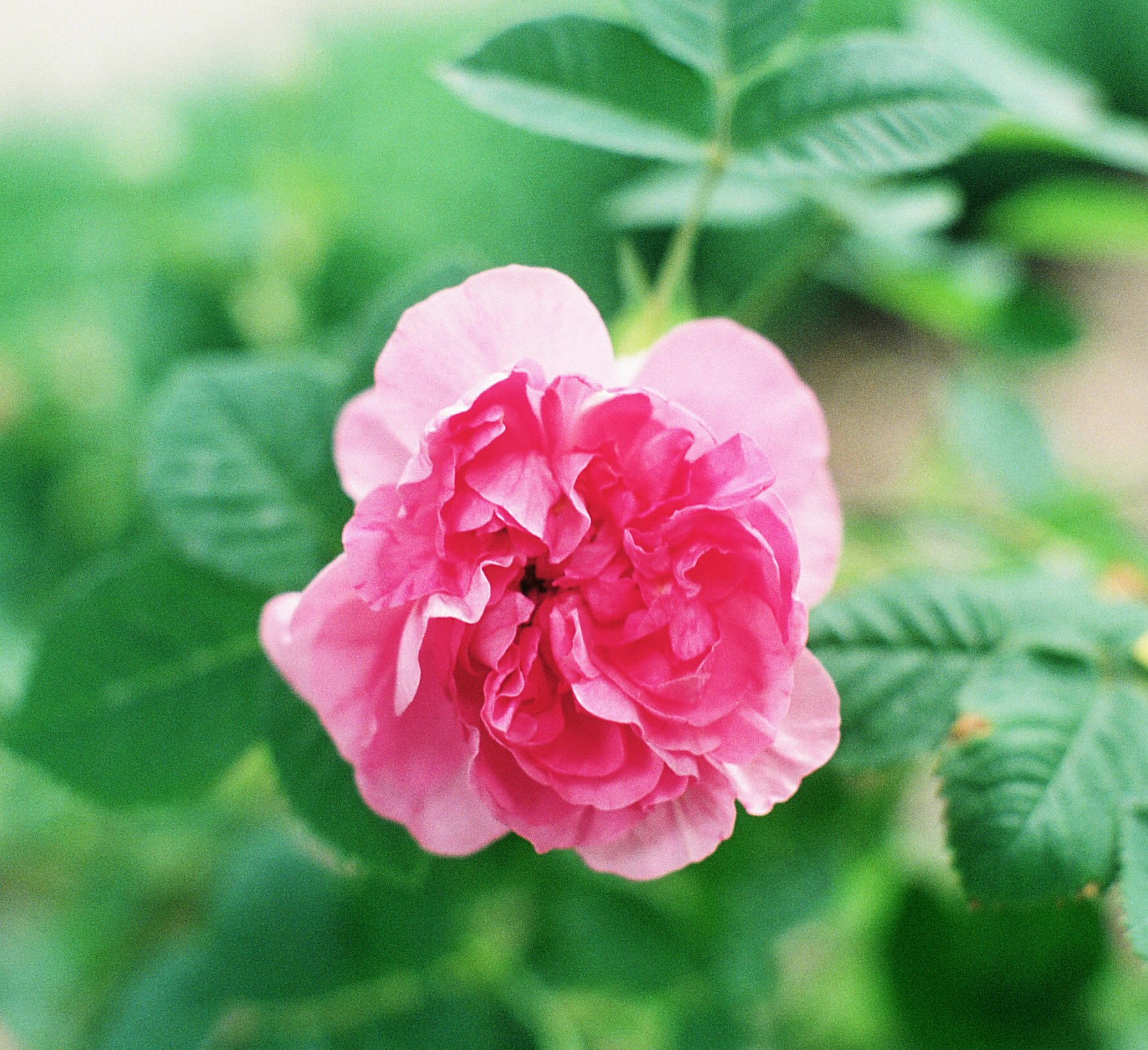
Impératrice Joséphine

Jacques-Louis Descemet dedicated Impératrice Joséphine to her sometime before 1815. Similarly, Jean-Pierre Vibert dedicated Joséphine Beauharnais in her honor in 1823. The rose 'Souvenir de la Malmaison' appeared in 1844, 30 years after her death, named in her honor by a Russian Grand Duke planting one of the first specimens in the Imperial Garden in St. Petersburg.

== Art patronage ==
Empress Joséphine was a great lover of all art. She was known for an interest in horticulture and loved all things artistic. She surrounded herself with creative people whose work ranged from paintings and sculpture to furniture and the architecture all around her. Joséphine always had an interest in art but it was with her marriage to her first husband that she would gain more access to art and artists. Due to her husband's high position in society she was often able to frequent many influential people's homes and learned from the works that were in their houses. After marrying Napoleon and becoming Empress she was surrounded by the works of the time, however Joséphine also appreciated the works of old masters. She was also drawn to artists and styles that were not widely used in her time, searching for artists that challenged the accepted standards. She visited the Salon to build relationships with contemporary artists. Joséphine became a patron to several different artists, helping to build their careers though their connection to her. After buying the Château de Malmaison, Joséphine had a blank canvas to showpiece her art and style and used it to create salons, galleries, a theater and her famous garden. The Malmaison and Tuileries Palace became centers for Napoleon's government but was recognized as an important place for the arts in any forms. Joséphine's court became the leading court in Europe for the arts. She became the first French female royal collector of this scale, leading in the Consular and Empire Style.

=== Paintings ===
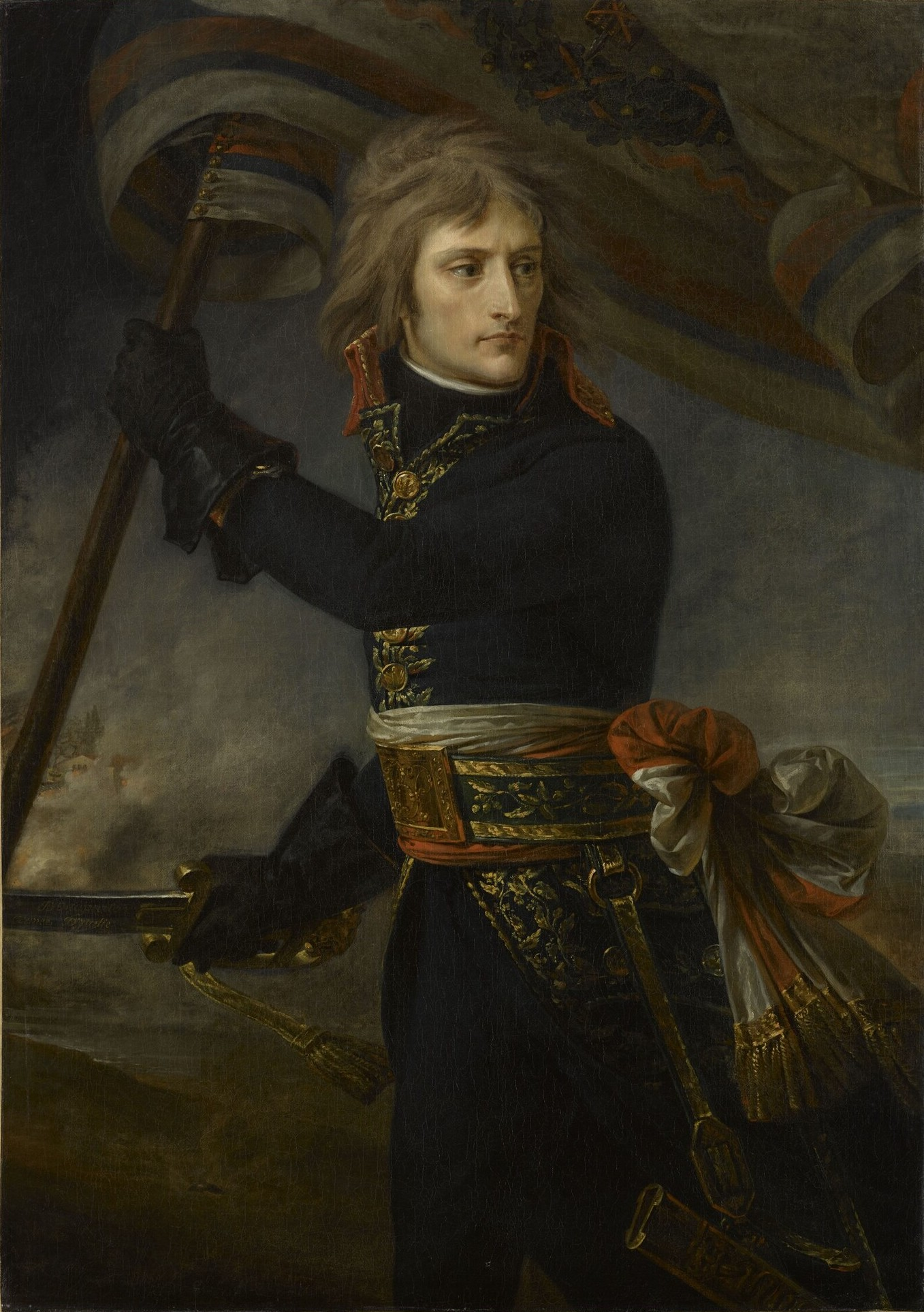
Antoine-Jean Gros, Bonaparte at the Pont d'Arcole, 1796

Joséphine worked with and sought out the works of many artists throughout her lifetime. In the area of painters she mainly was a collector of paintings but she was painted by and worked with several artists such as Jacques-Louis David and François Gérard. There was one painter whom Joséphine admired, Antoine-Jean Gros. Gros, upon hearing that Joséphine would be visiting Genoa, worked to get an introduction knowing that the association with Joséphine would help him become more well-known. Joséphine then commissioned him to create a portrait of her husband, the then General Bonaparte. The work took several sittings between Gros and Napoleon and would be named Bonaparte at the Pont d'Arcole. This painting would become a big part of Napoleon's propaganda and iconography. Gros would go on to paint other portraits of Napoleon, which always portrayed him as a fierce conqueror, propagating the image of Napoleon as powerful and unstoppable. Joséphine as a supporter and patron of Gros, aided him in becoming a central conduit for the message that the government was trying to disseminate about the rule of the Emperor in that time.

=== Sculpture ===
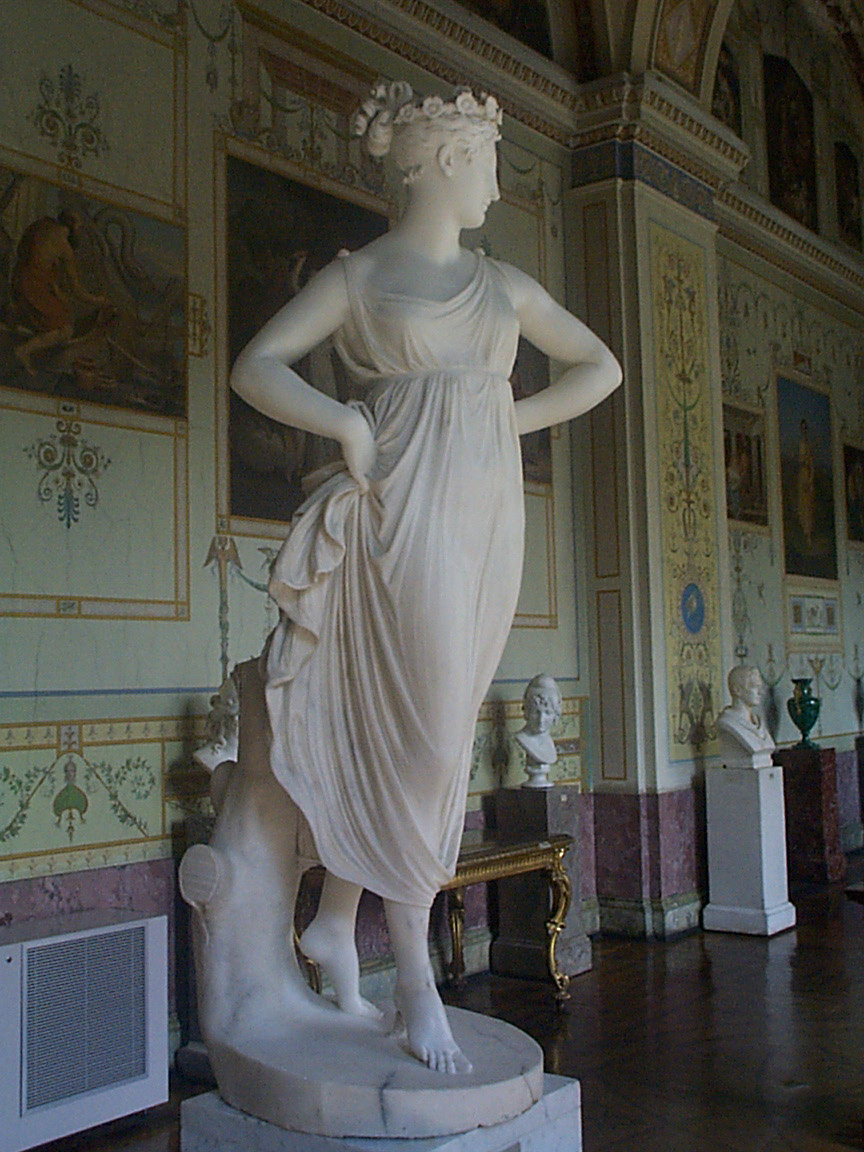
Antonio Canova Dancer with Her Hands on her Hips, 1812

Over her lifetime Joséphine commissioned four major pieces from the Italian Neoclassical sculptor Antonio Canova. The Empress was given a copy of Canova's work Cupid and Psyche, which was originally promised to Colonel John Campbell, but because of unforeseen circumstances it was gifted to Joséphine. She would commission Canova to create a sculpture and the result would be Dancer with Hands on Hips. The work was commissioned in 1802 but was not finished until 1812, Joséphine allowed him to create on his own terms, which were based on the classics but with a more relaxed and joyful appearance. He would create several sculptures based on dancing. Dancer with Hands on Hips was praised by the art community because it was not based on any specific ancient sculpture, but with a classical style, making it a completely original sculpture.

Joséphine would commission Canova again for another sculpture called Paris. The work's plaster cast was completed in 1807 but the marble statue was not finished until 1812. arriving in Malmaison in 1813 a year before Joséphine's death. The final sculpture that the Empress would commission was The Three Graces. This work would not be completed until after Joséphine's death in 1816. All four works were eventually sold to Tsar Alexander of Russia.

=== Furniture/Design ===
The architects Charles Percier and Pierre Fontaine essentially became the decorators for Joséphine and Napoleon. Many of Joséphine's most well-known furnishings were created especially for her by Percier and Fontaine. The two architects worked within many of the empire's residences, creating spaces for the Empress to feel at home in. Percier and Fontaine had their own unique style and created pieces for both the Emperor and his Empress, which can be easily identified as their work, even when they were not stamped as created by Percier or Fontaine. Percier and Fontaine are known for their use of cheval glass and the use of a feminine, softer feel for the pieces used in the boudoir of the Empress. These pieces were unique for the time and appreciated for their creativity. The architects Percier and Fontaine are connected to the Empire style associated with the time period.

== Arms ==
| Empress of the French (1804–1809) | Empress of the French's monogram (1804–1809) | Duchess of Navarre (1810–1814) |

== In popular culture ==
=== Statue ===
In 1859, French Emperor Napoleon III commissioned a statue of Joséphine, which was installed in the La Savane park in downtown Fort-de-France. In 1991, the statue was symbolically decapitated and spattered with red paint. The acts of vandalism were done on the belief that Joséphine had influenced her husband to issue the Law of 20 May 1802, which reinstated slavery in the French colonial empire (including Martinique). The statue was never repaired by the city administration, and every year more red paint was added to it. In July 2020, the statue was torn down and destroyed by rioters in the wake of the George Floyd protests.

=== Fiction books ===
- Conan Doyle, Sir Arthur (1897). Uncle Bernac.
- Fields, Bertram (2015). Destiny: A Novel of Napoleon & Josephine.
- Gulland, Sandra (1995). The Many Lives & Secret Sorrows of Josephine B.
- ——— (1998). Tales of Passion, Tales of Woe.
- ——— (2000). The Last Great Dance on Earth.
- Kenyon, F. W. (1952). The Emperor's Lady.
- Mossiker, Frances (1965). Napoleon and Josephine.
- ——— (1971). More Than a Queen: The Story of Josephine Bonaparte.
- Pataki, Allison (2020). The Queen's Fortune: Desiree, Napoleon, and the Dynasty That Outlasted the Empire.
- Selinko, Annemarie (1958). Désirée.
- Webb, Heather (2013). Becoming Josephine.
- Winterson, Jeanette (1987). The Passion.
- Parkyn, Stephanie (2019). Josephine's Garden

=== Television ===
- Amoureuse Joséphine (1974) is a French TV film with Napoleon portrayed by Pierre Arditi and Joséphine by Évelyne Dandry.
- Napoleon and Love (1974) is a British television series with Napoleon portrayed by Ian Holm and Joséphine by Billie Whitelaw.
- Joséphine ou la comédie des ambitions (1979) is a French miniseries with Napoleon portrayed by Daniel Mesguich and Joséphine by Danièle Lebrun.
- Napoléon and Josephine: A Love Story (miniseries) (1987) is an American miniseries with Napoleon portrayed by Armand Assante and Joséphine by Jacqueline Bisset.
- Napoleon (French: Napoléon et l'Europe) (1991) is a miniseries with Joséphine portrayed by Béatrice Agenin.
- Napoléon (2002) is a historical TV miniseries of Napoleon's life, in which Joséphine features prominently, portrayed by Isabella Rossellini.
- Aide-de-camps of Love (2005) is a historical Russian TV series with Joséphine portrayed by Irina Nizina.
- In 2015 and 2017, an episode of Horrible Histories called "Naughty Napoleon" and "Ridiculous Romantics" featured Natalie Walter and Gemma Whelan, portraying Joséphine de Beauharnais.
- Carême (2025) is a French historical drama series, with Joséphine portrayed by Maud Wyler.

=== Film ===
- In 1908 American film Napoleon, the Man of Destiny (1908), Joséphine is portrayed by Julia Arthur.
- In 1909 American film Napoleon and the Empress Josephine Joséphine is portrayed by Julia Swayne Gordon.
- In 1920 German film Madame Récamier Joséphine is portrayed by Johanna Mund.
- In 1923 British film A Royal Divorce Joséphine is portrayed by Gertrude McCoy.
- In 1927 French film Napoleon Joséphine is portrayed by Gina Manès.
- In 1927 American silent adventure and romantic drama film The Fighting Eagle Joséphine is portrayed by Julia Faye.
- In 1934 German historical romance film So Ended a Great Love Joséphine is portrayed by Erna Morena.
- In 1938 British film A Royal Divorce Joséphine is portrayed by Ruth Chatterton.
- In 1939 Italian historical comedy film The Boarders at Saint-Cyr Joséphine is portrayed by Maria Jacobini.
- In 1942 French film Le Destin fabuleux de Désirée Clary Joséphine is portrayed by Lise Delamare.
- In 1945 French historical drama film Pamela Joséphine is portrayed by Gisèle Casadesus.
- In 1951 Italian comedy film Napoleon Joséphine is portrayed by Marisa Merlini.
- In 1954 American film Désirée Joséphine is portrayed by Merle Oberon.
- In 1954 Italian anthology film Loves of Three Queens Joséphine is portrayed by Hedy Lamarr.
- In 1955 French historical epic film Napoléon Joséphine is portrayed by Michèle Morgan.
- In 1957 American fantasy film The Story of Mankind Joséphine is portrayed by Marie Windsor.
- In 1960 French historical drama film Austerlitz Joséphine is portrayed by Martine Carol.
- In 1962 French-Italian film Imperial Venus Joséphine is portrayed by Micheline Presle.
- In 1976 Italian comedy film The Loves and Times of Scaramouche Joséphine is portrayed by Ursula Andress.
- In Ridley Scott's 2023 film Napoleon, Joséphine is portrayed by English actress Vanessa Kirby.

=== Documentaries ===
- In Search of Josephine (2012), French documentary in English that traces her journey from Martinique to her coronation and beyond.
- The Emperor's Darling – Joséphine de Beauharnais (2017). Produced by ZDF and ARTE, this German documentary delves into her hidden diplomatic role and the complex, mutually dependent relationship she shared with Napoleon.
- Josephine, Napoleon’s Irresistible Asset (2018), French documentary, part of Secrets d'Histoire series, Josephine is portrayed by Garance Thénault.
- The Real War of Thrones (La guerre des trônes, la véritable histoire de l'Europe), Season 8 (2024–2025) - French documentary, Josephine is portrayed by Charlotte Meynaert.

=== Theatre and music ===
- The operetta Kaiserin Josephine, music by Emmerich Kálmán, which was premiered in Zürich on 18 January 1936.
- The love song 'Josephine' from The Magnetic Fields' 1991 album Distant Plastic Trees: "If I were Napoleon, you could be my Josephine ..."
- The song 'Josephine' from Frank Turner's 2015 album Positive Songs for Negative People references Joséphine – as well as Josephine Brunsvik – to portray Turner's wish that he has his own muse to influence him.
- The song 'Impressed' from Charlie Sexton's 1985 album Pictures for Pleasure references Napoleon and Josephine in the opening lines.
- The song 'Josephine' from Tori Amos' 1999 partially live album To Venus and Back references the pop-culture expression, supposedly spoken by Napoleon: "Not tonight, Joséphine" and his military career.
- The song 'Paint me, Redouté' from June Tabor's 2001 album Rosa Mundi, in which Josephine narrates her life to Redouté, and talks of her love of roses.
- In musical Napoleon by Timothy Williams and Andrew Sabiston Joséphine is one of the main characters. In 1994 Canadian production she was played by Aline Mowat, in 2000 London production she was played by Anastasia Barzee.
- In 2014 Japanese musical production Napoleon: The Man Who Never Sleeps by Takarazuka Revue Joséphine was played by Yumesaki Nene and Hinami Fuu.

=== Fashion ===
- John Galliano said that his inspiration was dressing the pregnant rock star Madonna — and then thinking "Empress Josephine."

== See also ==
- Aimée du Buc de Rivéry, a distant cousin-in-law of Empress Joséphine
- Jean Chanorier, a close friend of Empress Joséphine best known for introducing the Merino sheep breed in France, who later became an associate member of the Institut of France
- Notre-Dame de Paris
- The Swedish Royal Family's jewelry
- Tuileries Palace

Joséphine de Beauharnais Tascher de La Pagerie Born: 23 June 1763 Died: 29 May 1814
Royal titles
| Vacant Monarchy abolished Title last held by Marie Antoinette as Queen consort of the French | Empress consort of the French; 18 May 1804 – 10 January 1810 | Vacant Title next held by Marie Louise of Austria |
| Preceded by Isabella of Portugal as consort to the last crowned monarch, 1530 | Queen consort of Italy; 26 May 1805 – 10 January 1810 | Vacant Title next held by Marie Louise of Austria |
French nobility
| New title | Duchess of Navarre; 9 April 1810 – 29 May 1814 | Succeeded by Auguste de Beauharnais |
