= Émilie de Beauharnais =

French court official

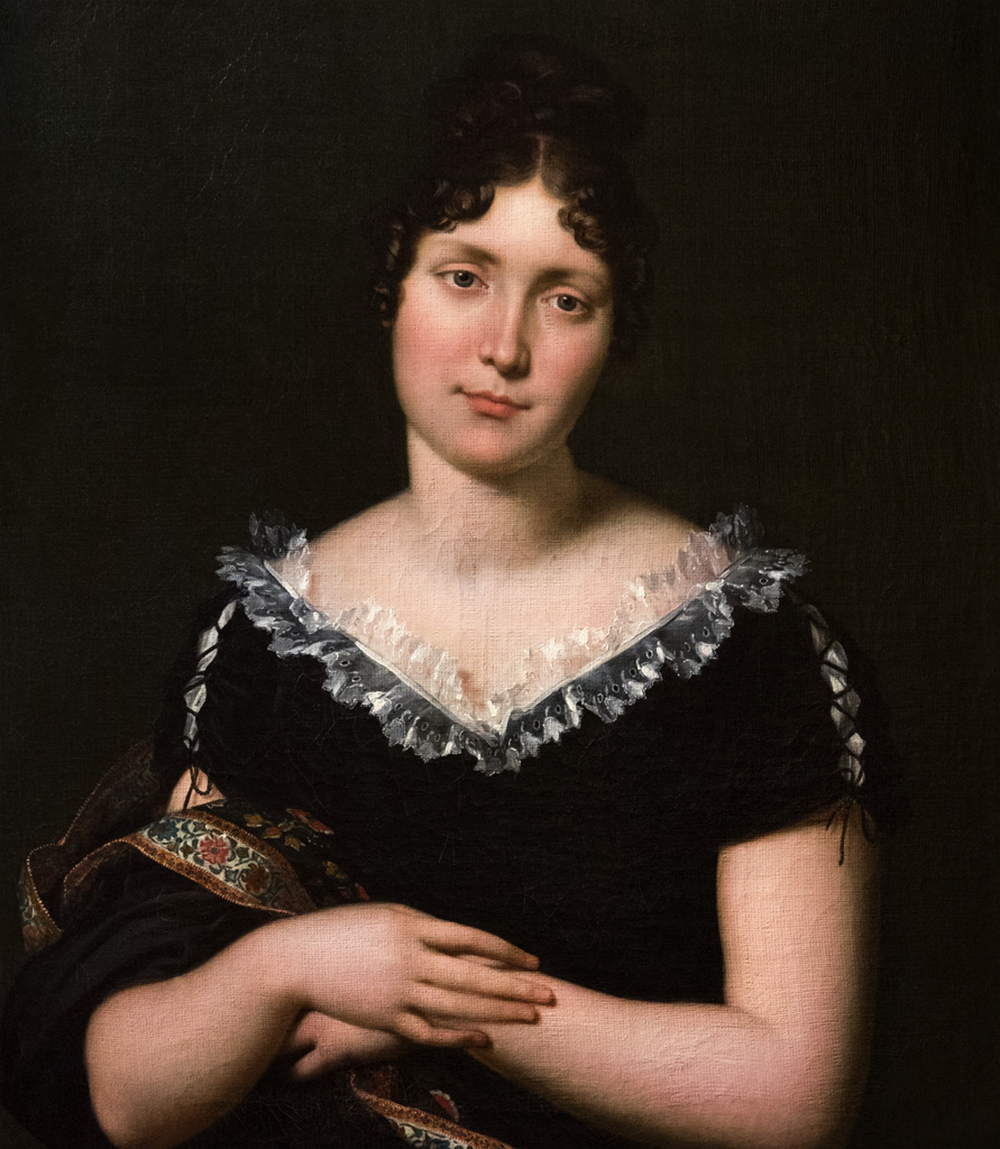
- Born: 1781
- Died: 1855 (aged 73–74)
- Noble family: House of Beauharnais
- Spouse: Antoine Marie Chamans, comte de Lavalette
- Father: François VI de Beauharnais
- Mother: Françoise de Beauharnais

Émilie de Beauharnais, comtesse de Lavalette (French pronunciation: [emili də boaʁnɛ]; 1781–1855), was a French court official, dame d'atour to Empress Joséphine of France.

== Life ==
She was the daughter of François VI de Beauharnais and Françoise de Beauharnais and thus related to Joséphine. She married Comte Antoine Marie Chamans de Lavalette, on 22 April 1798.

She belonged to those called to be appointed when the first ladies-in-waiting were named for Joséphine. In 1804, when Napoleon named himself Emperor of France, and his wife Empress, he also created an Imperial court and had ladies-in-waiting appointed to Empress Josephine. Adélaïde de La Rochefoucauld was made dame d'honneur and de Beauharnais made dame d'atour, while Jeanne Charlotte du Luçay, Madame de Rémusat, Elisabeth Baude de Talhouët, Lauriston, d'Arberg, Marie Antoinette Duchâtel, Sophie de Segur, Séran, Colbert, Savary and Aglaé Louise Auguié Ney, were all made dame du Palais.

When Napoleon divorced Joséphine and married Marie Louise of Austria, in 1809, de Beauharnais retired and was replaced by Jeanne Charlotte du Luçay.

During the Bourbon Restoration, her spouse was sentenced to death, but she helped him escape and was herself imprisoned in 1815–16.

Court offices
| Preceded by Geneviève d'Ossun | Dame d'atour 1804–1809 | Succeeded by Jeanne Charlotte du Luçay |
