= Jeanne Charlotte du Luçay =

French court official

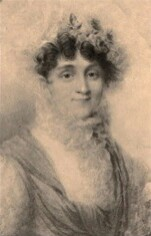
Jeanne Charlotte du Luçay

Jeanne Charlotte du Luçay née Papillon d'Auteroche (French pronunciation: [ʒan ʃaʁlɔt dy lysɛ]; 1769–1842), was a French court official, Dame du Palais to Empress Joséphine and Dame d'atour to Empress Marie Louise of France.

== Life ==
Jeanne Charlotte du Luçay was married to count Jean-Baptiste-Charles Legendre de Luçay (1754–1836), prefect at the Imperial court.

=== Dame de Palais ===
She belonged to those appointed ladies-in-waiting when the first Imperial Household was composed for empress Joséphine after the introduction of the monarchy in 1804: Adélaïde de La Rochefoucauld was created Dame d'honneur and Émilie de Beauharnais Dame d'atours, while Jeanne Charlotte du Luçay, along with Madame de Rémusat, Elisabeth Baude de Talhouët, Madame Lauriston, Madame d'Arberg, Marie Antoinette Duchâtel, Sophie de Segur, Madame Séran, Madame Colbert, Madame Savary and Aglaé Louise Auguié Ney was made Dame du palais.

She participated in the coronation of Napoleon and Josephine on 2 December 1804. She was tasked to receive Catharina of Württemberg upon her wedding to Jérôme Bonaparte in 1807.

General Durand described Jeanne Charlotte du Luçay as a pretty, well-mannered person who avoided harming her enemies and had the courage to stand up and defend those not present when slander was uttered against them, and well suited for court service. She was known for her good taste, and was a fashion icon who often launched the latest fashion in high society, which was then followed by others.

=== Dame d'atour ===
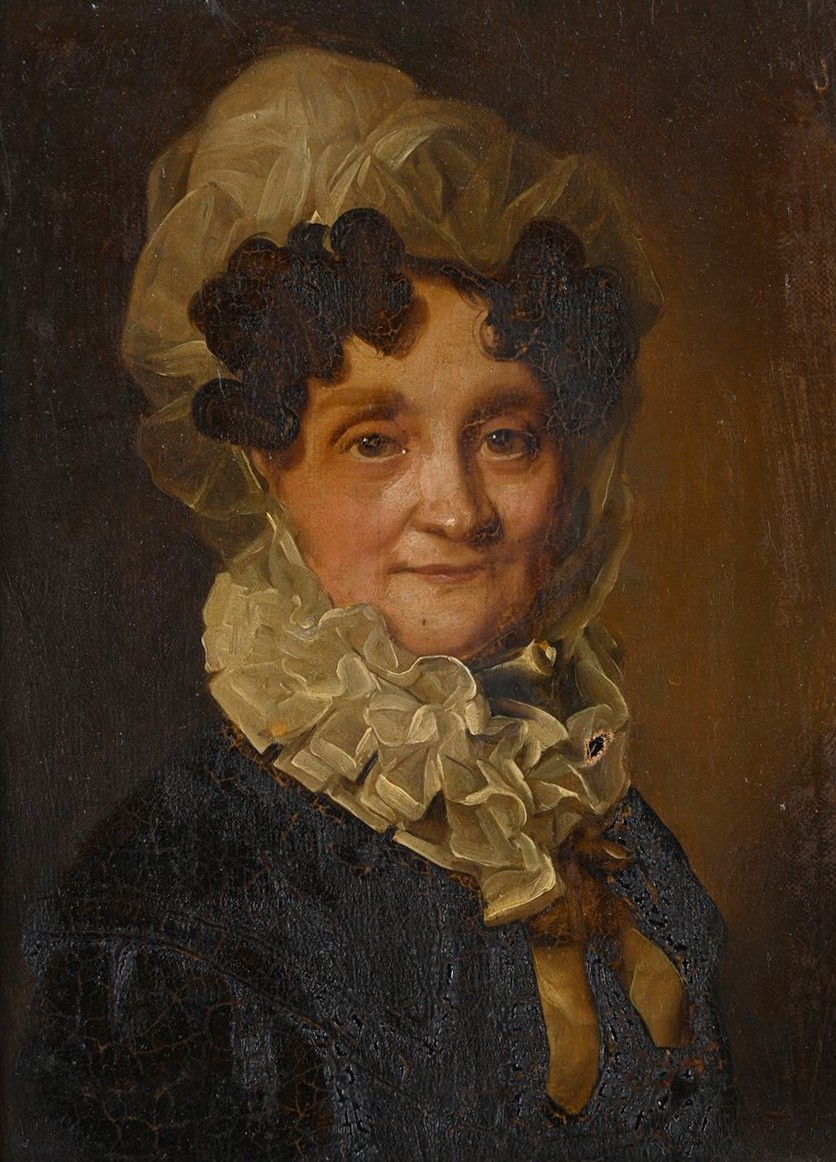
Portrait of Jeanne Charlotte de Luçay, by Louis Léopold Boilly, early 19th century

When Napoleon divorced Josephine and remarried to Marie Louise, Jeanne Charlotte du Luçay was assigned to be a part of the entourage to Branua to receive Marie Louise and escort her to Napoleon in Compiègne.

When the household of Marie Louise was formed, her superior Adélaïde de La Rochefoucauld was replaced by Louise Antoinette Lannes, Duchess of Montebello, and du Luçay succeeded Émilie de Beauharnais as Dame d'atour, while the Duchesse de Bassano, Comtesses de Montmorency, Madame Mortemart, Madame de Bouille, Madame Talhouet, Madame Lauriston, Madame Duchatel, Madame Montalivert, Madame Peron, Madame Lascaris, Madame Noailles, Madame Ventimiglia, Madame Brignole, Madame Gentili, and Madame Canisy were named Dame du palais.

As Dame d'atour, she was second in rank of all the ladies-in-waiting to the empress, responsible for her wardrobe and jewels and supervising the expenses and business transactions connected to them. Because of the lack of interest of her superior, the Duchess of Montebello, she also took over her task of administrating the alms and charities of the empress. She was present during the birth of the King of Rome 20 March 1811.

Jeanne Charlotte du Luçay remained in service to Marie Louise until she left her at Rambouillet the 11 April 1814, after the abdication of Napoleon and before the departure of Marie Louise to Austria. She, alongside the duchess de Montebello, the countess de Castilgione and the countess de Montalivet, were the only ladies-in-waiting accompanying Marie Louise when she fled from Paris.

Her spouse temporarily regained his court office during the Hundred Days in 1815, but after this, the couple retired to private life.
