= Kerstin Cardon =

Swedish painter and art teacher

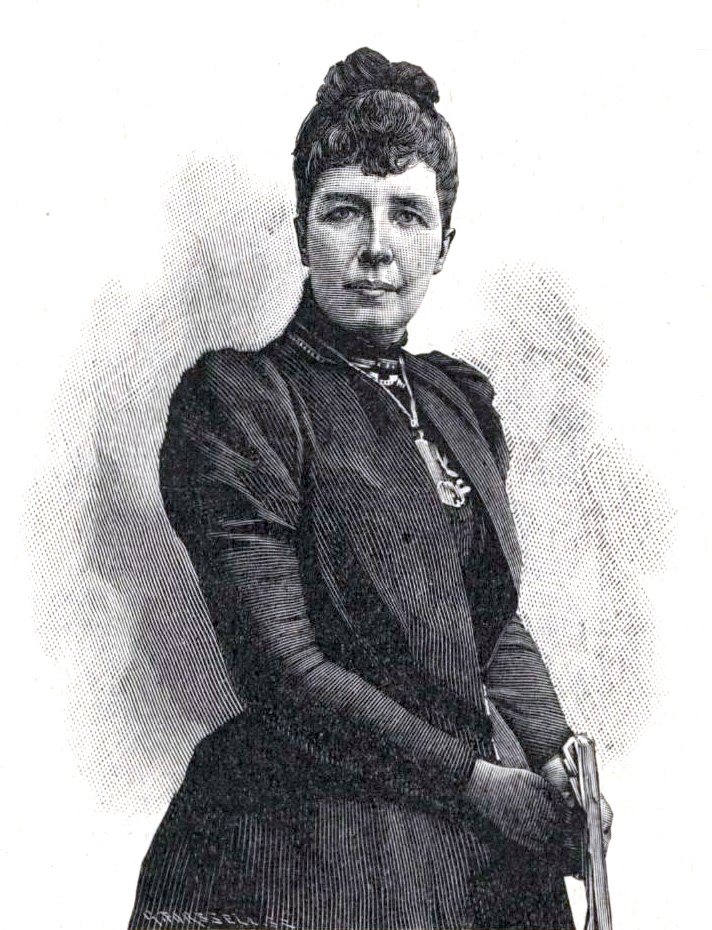
Kerstin Cardon (1894)

Mathilda Kristina (Kerstin) Cardon (1843–1924) was a Swedish painter and art teacher. One of the first 18 women to be admitted to the women's section of the Royal Swedish Academy of Fine Arts, she went on to produce portraits and still lifes in oils and pastels. In 1875, she began teaching at the Women's Teacher Training Seminary (Högre lärarinneseminariet) and opened her own painting school in central Stockholm. A popular high-society portrait painter, she produced three portraits of King Oscar II.

== Biography ==
Born in Stockholm on 17 August 1843, Mathilda Kristina Cardon was the daughter of the lithographic artist Johan Elias Cardon (1802–1878) and his wife Britta Kristina née Sundberg (1812–1894). She was the younger of two daughters. After initially being trained by her father, in 1864 she was one of the first 18 women to be accepted by the new women's section of the Royal Academy where she studied until 1871.

She first painted still lifes and genre paintings, submitting a somewhat humorous work, Lurande katt ('Lurking Cat'), to Stockholm's Art Association in 1868. On completing her studies, she took study trips to Paris, Munich, London, Vienna, Italy and the Netherlands, in particular to perfect her portrait painting.

In 1875, after teaching at various schools in Stockholm, she was engaged by the Teachers' Training College as a drawing instructor until 1884. In parallel, she opened a painting school in her studio on Drottninggatan in the centre of Stockholm where she remained until 1911. Through her many students, she was able to make a significant contribution to art in Sweden. In 1890, she became a member of the Swedish Artists' Federation (Svenska Konstnärsförbundet) and was appointed a commissioner for the Swedish female artists' section of the 1893 Chicago World's Fair. From 1907, she was a member of the Friends of Handicraft's art committee.

In addition to her three portraits of King Oscar II, she painted many prominent Swedes, including the explorer Sven Hedin, the painter Gustaf Rydberg and many counts and barons. Her works are in the collection of the Malmö Art Museum and the engravings section of the Nationalmuseum in Stockholm.

Kerstin Cardon died in Stockholm on 5 January 1924.
