= Vergennes Township =

Vergennes Township may refer to the following places:

- Vergennes Township, Jackson County, Illinois
- Vergennes Township, Kent County, Michigan

See also

- Vergennes (disambiguation)
