= Napoleon (1991 TV series) =

Television series

- Genre: Historical drama
- Written by: Jean Gruault; Carlos Saboga; Krzysztof Zanussi
- Starring: Jean-François Stévenin; Andrzej Seweryn; Jacques Frantz
- Composer: Wojciech Kilar
- Countries of origin: France; Poland
- Original language: French
- No. of series: 1
- No. of episodes: 6

Production
- Producer: António da Cunha Telles
- Running time: 52 minutes

Original release
- Network: France 3
- Release: 11 January – 15 February 1991

Napoleon (French: Napoléon et l'Europe) is a historical television series co-produced by France and Poland. It originally aired in 6 episodes between 11 January and 15 February 1991 on France 3. It charts the career of Napoleon, Emperor of France, from his return from his expedition to Egypt to his exile on the island of Elba.

== Selected cast ==
- Jean-François Stévenin as Napoléon Bonaparte
- Andrzej Seweryn as Tsar Alexandre
- Jacques Frantz as Murat
- Jerzy Kryszak as Fouche
- Bruno Madinier as Lucien Bonaparte
- Jean-Claude Durand as Talleyrand
- Jan Nowicki as Paul Barras
- Philippe Bouclet as Caulaincourt
- Liliana Komorowska as Hortense de Beauharnais
- Krzysztof Stroiński as Lavalette
- Adam Ferency as Duroc
- Michal Pawlicki as Berthier
- Jacek Domanski as Joseph Bonaparte
- Daniel Olbrychski as Jozef Poniatowski
- James Faulkner as Maitland
- Béatrice Agenin as Joséphine de Beauharnais
- Christoph Waltz as Karl Emmanuel
- Corinne Marchand as Madame Aubert
- Joanna Szczepkowska as Marie Walewska
- Thierry Bosc as Maréchal Ney
- Tadeusz Lomnicki as Koutouzov
- Marek Kondrat as Prince Adam Czartryski
- Leszek Teleszyński as Jacques Lauriston
- Ewa Wisniewska as Fanny Dillon
- Grzegorz Wons as Bessières
- Adam Baumann as Prince Radziwill
- Jerzy Zelnik as Nicolas Chopin
- Miroslaw Konarowski as Eugène de Beauharnais
- José Fonseca e Costa as Wellesley
- Hanna Stankówna as Laetitia Bonaparte

== Bibliography ==
- Gengembre, Gerard, Chalencon, Pierre-Jean & Chanteranne, David. Napoleon: The Immortal Emperor. Harry N. Abrams, 2003.
- Kirchner, Andreas. Ein Architekt der Sinnlichkeit: die Farbwelten des Kameramanns Slawomir Idziak. Schüren, 2007.
- Mattei, Jean-Pierre. Napoléon & le cinéma: un siècle d'images. Editions Alain Piazzola, 1998.
