= Axel Nordgren =

Swedish painter (1828–1888)

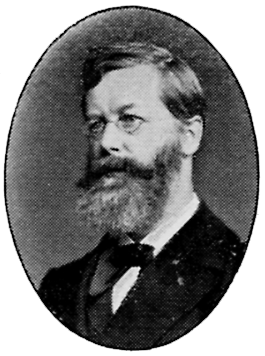
Axel Nordgren, from the Svenskt Porträttgalleri XX

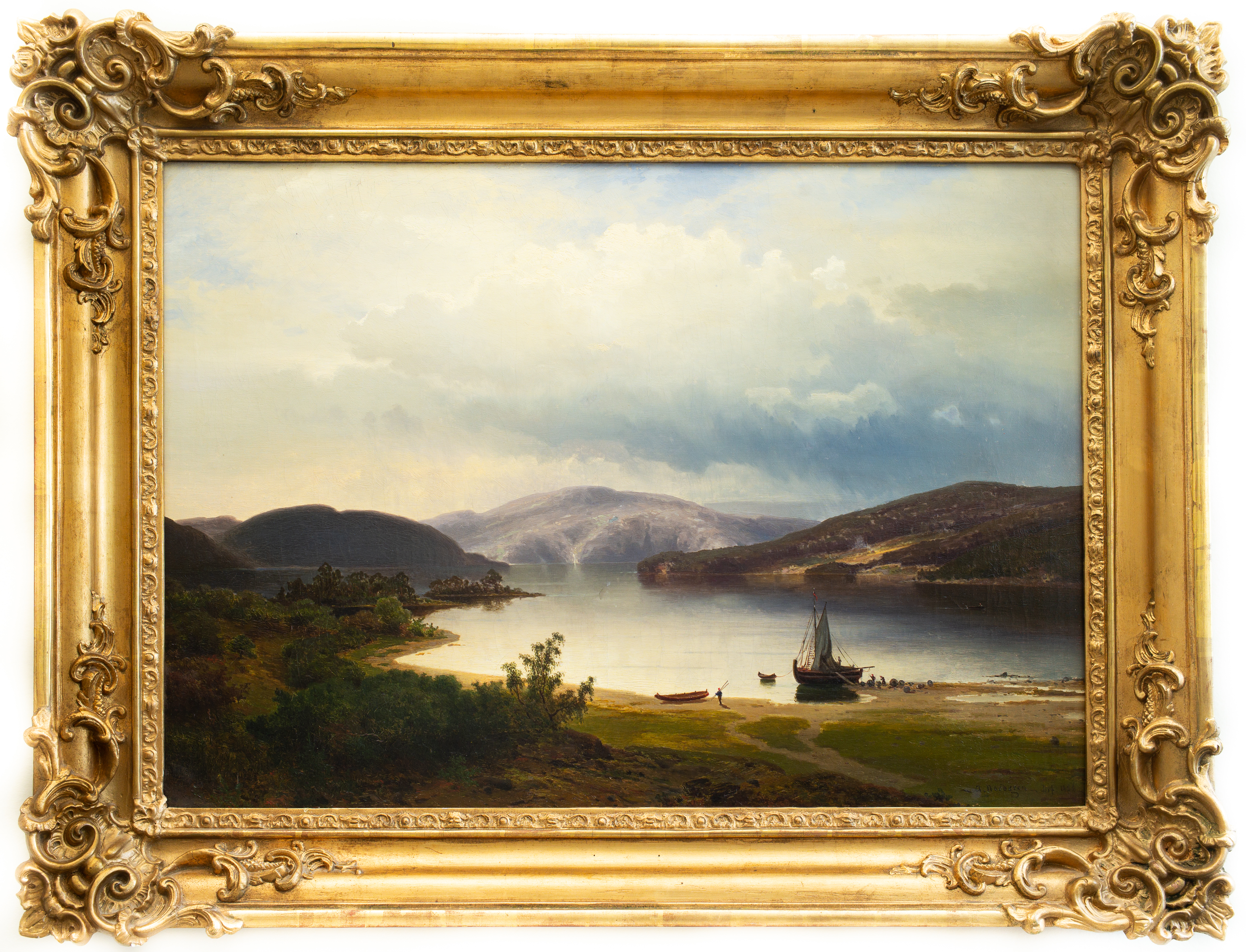
Setting Out in the Fjords 1858

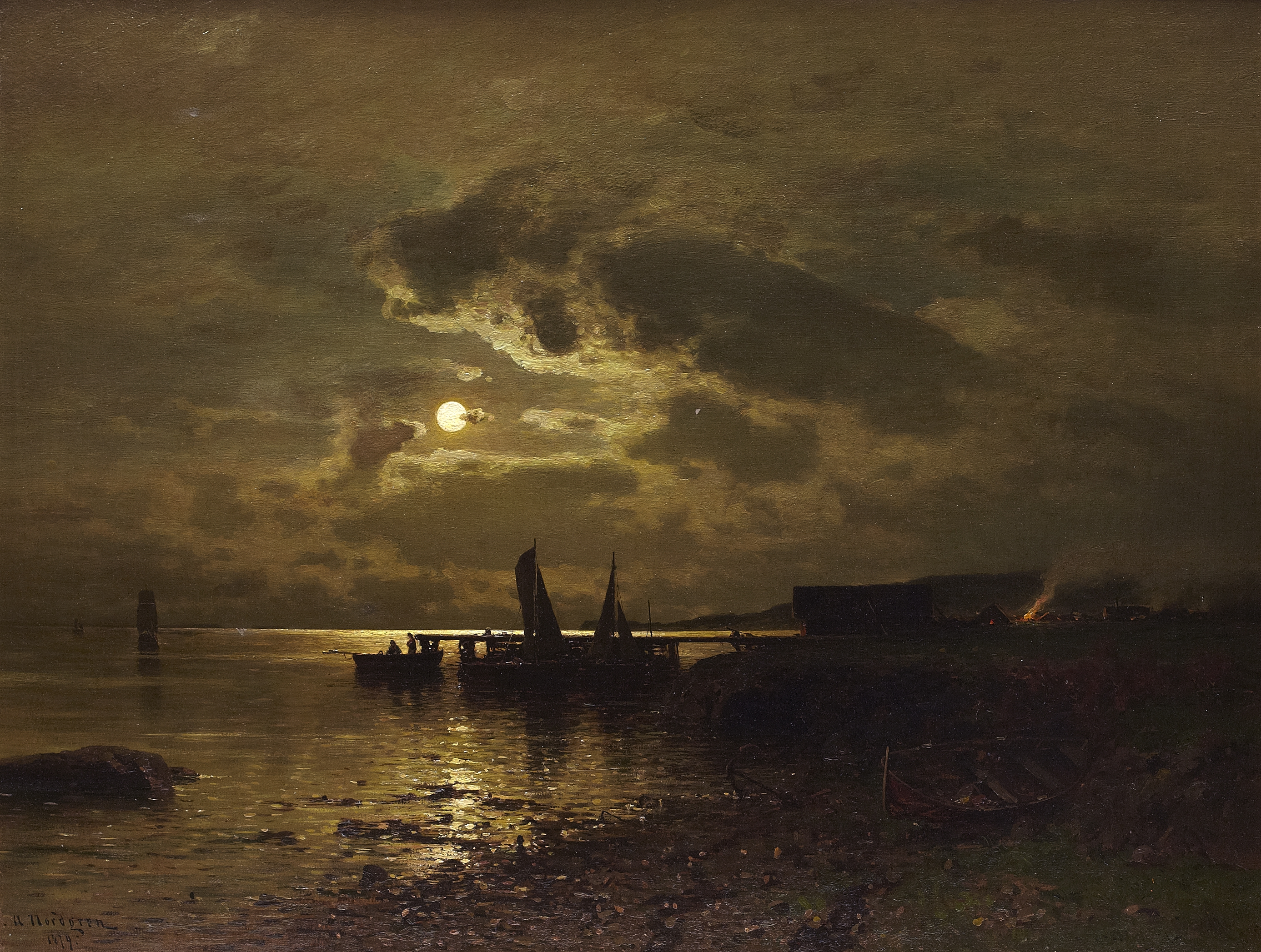
Fishing Village in the Moonlight

Axel Wilhelm Nordgren (5 December 1828, Stockholm - 12 February 1888, Düsseldorf) was a Swedish landscape painter.

== Biography ==
His father, Carl Wilhelm Nordgren, was a well known portrait painter from whom he took his first lessons. After completing his courses at the Royal Institute of Art in 1845, he was on the list to become a full student at the Royal Swedish Academy of Fine Arts but, for unknown reasons, did not attend. In 1849, he presented some landscapes at an Academy exhibition. The most favored works there were by Norwegian artists trained in Düsseldorf. This was the beginning of a trend for Swedish artists to study there as well. In 1851, he and Morten Müller were able to go there to continue their studies, at the expense of the Crown Prince (later King) Karl XV. His primary instructor was his peer, Hans Gude, whom he had met at the exhibition in 1849. He was also influenced by Gude's teacher, Andreas Achenbach, who taught him to do careful detail studies from nature before painting.

Although he eventually decided to make Düsseldorf his home, he made periodic study trips back to Sweden and to Norway, often in the company of Gude or Müller. In 1857, he married Anna Mariane Natalie Lochen (1832-1921), the daughter of a Norwegian merchant. Many of his study trips were made with his colleague, Gustaf Rydberg, who helped him discover new areas for painting. He often worked en plein aire, after the French style, but was not impressed by the Barbizon School.

He received numerous medals at exhibitions, although the critical consensus seems to have been that his works were "dry". He preferred to paint scenes with coastlines, cliffs, wintry moods and moonlight. Many of his works featured rough and barren areas. He was considered to be the leading practitioner of the Düsseldorf School in Sweden. In the 1870s, when that school became the subject of harsh, even devastating criticism, he rejected those critiques as a "public nuisance" (in a letter to Johan Christoffer Boklund).

During the Long Depression, which hit Germany especially hard, he found himself having financial difficulties. From letters he exchanged with Julius Weidig, a Master Tailor who was also an amateur painter, it would appear that he was bartering paintings for clothing. In another letter to Boklund he describes himself as being plagued by "permanent homesickness".

In 1883, he had a stroke, which prevented further travels abroad. He was still able to paint, however, and continued to exhibit in Stockholm until his death. His works may be seen at the Nationalmuseum and the Göteborgs konstmuseum).
