= Carl Wilhelm Nordgren =

Swedish painter and trumpeter (1846–1857)

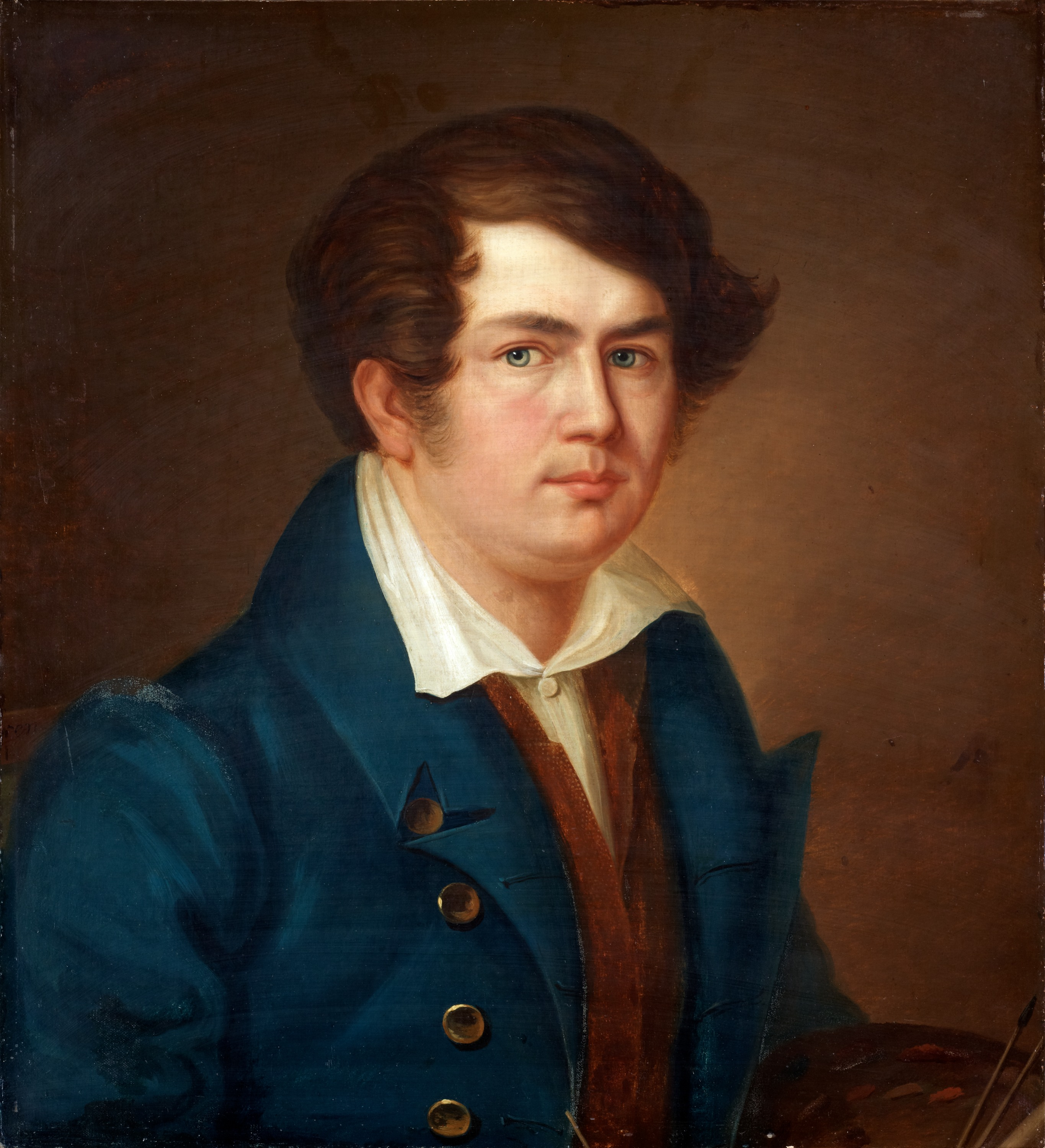
Self-portrait (1831)

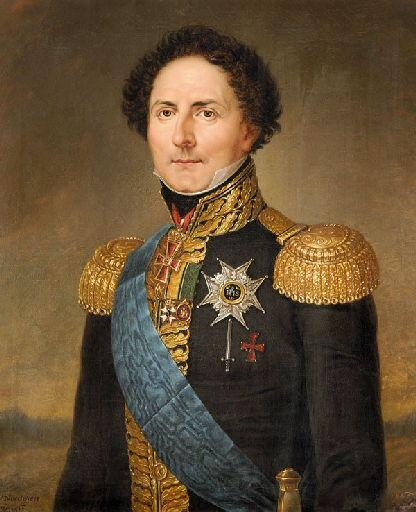
King Karl XIV Johan

Carl Wilhelm Nordgren (11 May 1804, Stockholm – 9 January 1857, Stockholm) was a Swedish portrait painter and professional trumpeter, for the Life Guards of Horse.

== Biography ==
His father, Gustaf Daniel Nordgren, was a watchmaker. While still quite young, he took a job as a military trumpet player; largely because of his family's poverty, rather than musical aptitude.

He drew and painted as a hobby, and his skills were noticed by Count Magnus Brahe who, in 1828, helped him enroll at the Royal Swedish Academy of Fine Arts. There, he studied portrait painting with Fredric Westin. He participated in the Academy's exhibitions until 1856. On Royal commission, in 1831, he painted a view of Gripsholm Castle

In 1827, he married Johanna Amalia Rautell. Their son, Axel also became a well known painter.

According to his own accounting, he created over 600 original portraits and a large number of copies. He also did some landscapes, genre scenes and religious works, but they are much less familiar. His works may be seen at the Nationalmuseum, the Stockholm City Museum, Nordiska museet, Länsmuseet Gävleborg, and Skokloster Castle as well as the Musée Bernadotte in France.
