= Antoine Marie Chamans, comte de Lavalette =

French politician and general

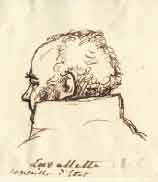
- Sketch by Frédéric-Christophe d'Houdetot

Minister of Posts
- In office 1804–1815

Personal details
- Born: 14 October 1769 Paris, France
- Died: 15 February 1830 (aged 60) Paris, France
- Spouse: Émilie de Beauharnais

Antoine Marie Chamans, comte de Lavalette (14 October 1769 – 15 February 1830) was a French politician and general.

== Biography ==
=== Early life ===
Born in Paris the same year as Napoleon Bonaparte, he spent the Revolution in the French Revolutionary Army, where he rose through the ranks to become an aide-de-camp to General Louis Baraguey d'Hilliers.

In 1796, after the Battle of the Bridge of Arcole, Baraguey d'Hilliers introduced his aide-de-camp to Napoleon, who was impressed enough to take him onto his personal staff and to entrust him with diplomatic missions. Subsequently, on 22 April 1798, Lavalette was married to Émilie de Beauharnais (1781–1855), niece of Napoléon's wife Joséphine.

=== Consulate and Empire ===
Lavalette returned to France with Napoleon, taking part in the latter's 18 Brumaire coup against the French Directory (1799). He occupied a number of offices in the French Consulate and First Empire, most notably eleven years as Minister of Posts, during which he oversaw the covert monitoring of the mail of suspected Royalists. On 27 November 1808, he was created a Count of the Empire.

Having rejected the opportunity to go into exile with Napoleon, because he had a pregnant wife and a 13-year-old daughter, he was arrested after the beginning of the Bourbon Restoration. His wife had lost her pregnancy in October, and, on 21 November 1815, Lavalette was sentenced to execution by the Ultras.

=== Flight and exile ===
One night before his scheduled execution, he was visited by his wife and daughter Josephine (later the Baronne de Forget, who became the long-time mistress of Eugène Delacroix) and managed to change clothes and places with his wife, a ruse that was not discovered until the next morning. Having escaped prison, Lavalette made his way to Great Britain with the assistance of a small group of British soldiers, amongst whom were Robert Wilson and John Hely-Hutchinson. He then made his way to the United Kingdom of the Netherlands, and finally to Bavaria, where he had the support of Eugène de Beauharnais of his wife's family and his father-in-law Maximilian I Joseph of Bavaria. Madame Lavalette remained in prison until 23 January 1816.

Lavalette was able to return to France in 1822 and died in 1830, most likely of lung cancer. He was buried at Père Lachaise Cemetery.
