= Vergennes =

Vergennes can refer to:

People

- Charles Gravier, comte de Vergennes (1719–1787), French statesman and diplomat who directed his country during the American War of Independence
- Jean Gravier, marquis de Vergennes (1718-1794), French magistrate and diplomat, older brother of Charles Gravier

Places

- Vergennes, Illinois
- Vergennes, Vermont
- Vergennes Township, Michigan
- Vergennes (grape), a variety of grape used to make white wine
