= Pauline Fourès =

French painter and novelist (1778–1869)

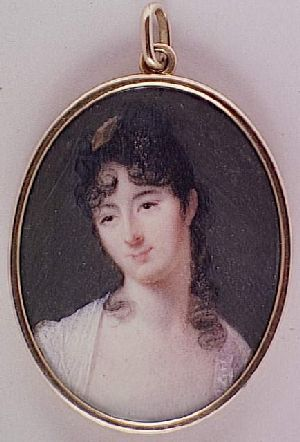
Fourès

Pauline Fourès (March 15, 1778 – March 18, 1869), born Pauline Bellisle, was a French novelist best known for being a mistress of Napoleon Bonaparte.

== Life ==
Fourès was born in Pamiers on March 15, 1778 to Marguerite Brandon and Henri Jacques-Clement Bellisle, a clockmaker. She worked as a milliner and married Jean-Noel Fourès, a cavalryman who was on leave from military duty. When Jean-Noel was called back to active duty during the couple's honeymoon, Fourès accompanied him on the French army's trip to Egypt. As the soldiers' spouses were not permitted to come on the transport ship, Fourès wore a Chasseur uniform to disguise herself, successfully remaining undetected for 54 days until the expedition's arrival in Alexandria.

After meeting Fourès, Napoleon sent her husband away on a military mission to France and began courting her. After her husband's early return, Fourès and Jean-Noel divorced.

Pauline later married Pierre Henri de Ranchoux and then, after divorcing him, Jean Baptiste Bellard, an army officer. The couple set up a successful business in Brazil, from where she returned to Paris in 1837.

She published two novels, Lord Wentworth (1813) and Aloïze de Mespres, nouvelle tirée des chroniques du XII° siècle (1814), which had some success.

== Bibliography ==
- Marcel Dupont, Pauline Fourès: Une maîtresse de Napoléon (Hachette, 1942)
- Roger Régis, Pauline Fourès dite "Bellilote" Maîtresse de Bonaparte en Egypte (Collection Les Grandes Favorites, 1946)
