= Jean Gravier, marquis de Vergennes =

The Marquis of Vergennes
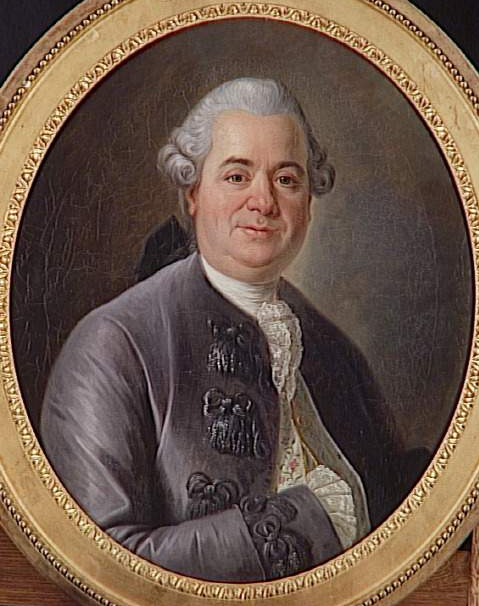

French Ambassador to Switzerland
- In office 1775/1786–1777/1789

French Ambassador to Portugal
- In office 1777–1779

French Ambassador to the Republic of Venice
- In office 1779–1785

President of the Court of Auditors of Burgundy
- Monarch: King Louis XV of France

Personal details
- Born: 4 November 1718 Dijon, France
- Died: 24 July 1794 (aged 75) Paris, Revolutionary France
- Spouse: Jeanne Claude Chevignard (m. 1746–1784)
- Children: Five
- Profession: Magistrate, Diplomat

Jean-Charles Gravier, Marquis of Vergennes and Baron of Tenare, was a French aristocrat, magistrate and diplomat. He was the elder brother of the French Minister of Foreign Affairs and Louis XVI's Chief Minister, Charles Gravier de Vergennes.

== Biography ==
Born in Dijon in 1718, the eldest son of Charles Gravier, Lord of Vergennes, he became a chief counselor in the Court of Auditors of Burgundy in 1738 and then President of the Court in 1742. As the eldest son, he inherited his family's estates. He was named as the French King's ambassador in Switzerland from 1775 to 1777. As ambassador, he renewed the treaty of alliance between France and the Swiss cantons on 28 May 1777, in Solothurn. He was then appointed as French Ambassador to Portugal in 1777, as Ambassador to the Republic of Venice from 1779 to 1785, and as Ambassador, for a second time, to Switzerland from 1786 to 1789.

Imprisoned in the Saint-Lazare Prison during the French Revolution, he was guillotined alongside his eldest son Charles Gravier de Vergennes on 24 July 1794, in Paris.

Jean Gravier married to Jeanne Chevignard de Chavigny from a noble Burgundian family related to the Graviers, daughter of Philibert Chevignard de Chavigny, President of the Parliament of Besançon and niece of the ambassador Théodore Chevignard de Chavigny, Count of Toulongeon. He is the grand-father of Claire Élisabeth de Vergennes, Madame de Rémusat and of the politician, anti-revolutionary fighter and Marshal of France, Antoine-Charles de Ganay, among others. The Gravier family is a family of the surviving French nobility.

== See also ==
- Charles Gravier, comte de Vergennes

== Sources ==
- Sylvi Nicolas, Les derniers maîtres des requêtes de l'Ancien Régime (1771-1789): dictionnaire prosopographique, 1998 (French)
- A. Ferret, Ormes, archiprêtré de Bresse et port sur Saône, revue « Images de Saône-et-Loire » No. 40 (hiver 1978-1979), p. 21-24 (French)
