= Gustaf Rydberg =

Swedish painter (1835–1933)

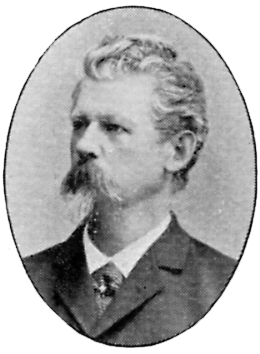
Gustaf Rydberg, from the Svenskt Porträttgalleri XX

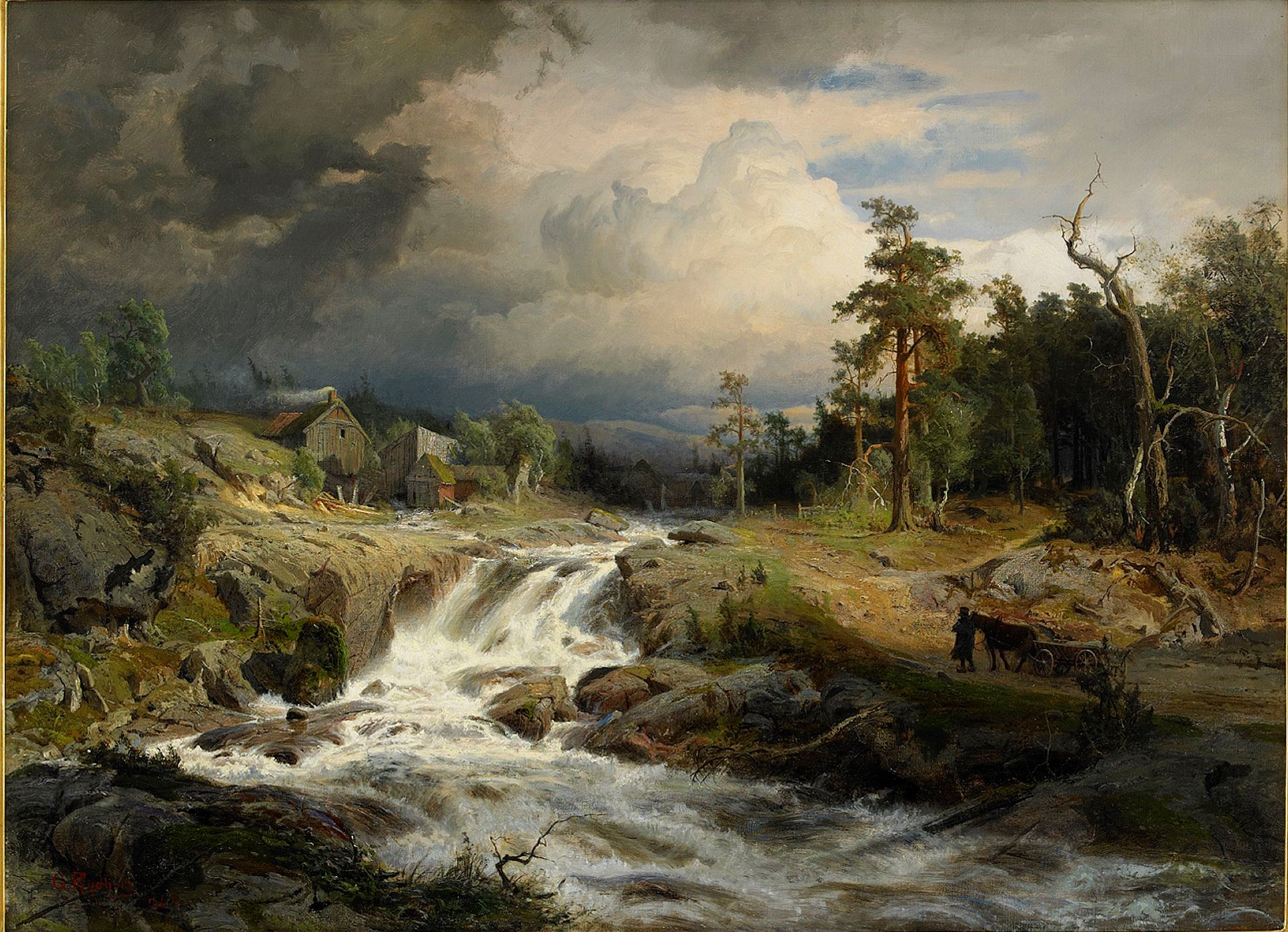
Scene from Värmland

Gustaf Fredrik Rydberg (13 September 1835 – 11 October 1933) was a Swedish landscape painter.

== Biography ==
Gustaf Fredrik Rydberg was born at Malmö, Sweden. His father, Gustaf Isak Rydberg, was the local postmaster. From 1852 to 1855, he was a student of the landscape painter, Frederik Christian Kiærskou, at the Royal Danish Academy of Fine Arts, then continued at the Royal Swedish Academy of Fine Arts where he studied under Edward Bergh. In 1859, as many Swedes did, he went to Düsseldorf to complete his studies. His first instructor was the Norwegian landscape painter, Hans Fredrik Gude, followed by Oswald Achenbach. He spent five years there, visiting Skåne in the summers, which would remain one of his favorite places to sketch and paint.

After returning to Sweden, in 1866, he was named a member candidate (agré) at the Royal Academy and had his first exhibition. In 1868, he made a study trip to Norway in the company of King Karl XV and made another trip there on the King's behalf the following year. Around 1870, he began to paint exclusively En plein air. He was elected a full member of the Academy in 1871. Over the next decade, he made numerous trips to Paris, Belgium and the Netherlands. In 1887, he married Ebba Josephina Borgström (1839–1905). Later, they left Stockholm to live in Västerås and, in 1897, settled permanently in Skåne. A major retrospective jubilee was held by the Academy in 1920, on the occasion of his 85th birthday. He was awarded the Illis quorum in 1925. Gustaf Rydberg died at Malmö in 1933 at the age of 98.

His works are generally in the style of the Düsseldorf School, but he has also been compared to Camille Corot and adopted some techniques from his friend, Alfred Wahlberg. He was never influenced by any of the newer stylistic trends that emerged around the turn of the century. His works may be seen at the Gothenburg Museum of Art and the Nationalmuseum.
