= Madame de Rémusat =

French writer

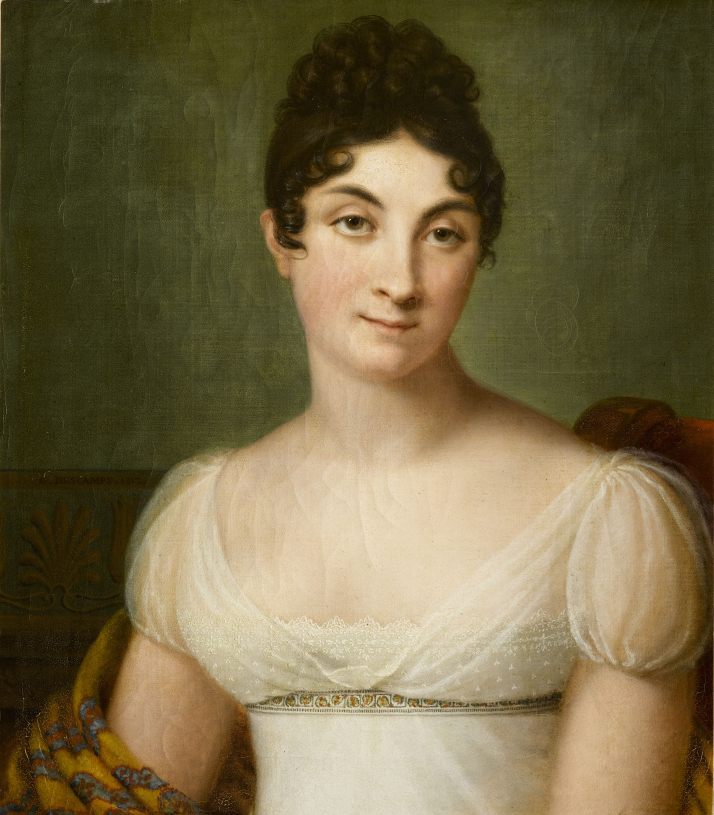
- Portrait of Madame de Rémusat by Guillaume Descamps, 1813
- Born: 5 January 1780; Paris
- Died: 16 December 1821 (aged 41); Paris

Claire Élisabeth Jeanne Gravier de Vergennes de Rémusat (5 January 1780 – 16 December 1821) was a French woman of letters. She married at sixteen, and was attached to the Empress Josephine as dame du palais in 1802.

== Life ==
Talleyrand was among her admirers, and she was generally regarded as a woman of great intellectual capacity and personal grace. After her death, her Essai sur l'éducation des femmes, was published and received academic approval, but it was not until her grandson, Paul de Rémusat, published her Mémoires (3 vols., Paris, 1879–80), which followed by some correspondence with her son (2 vols., 1881), that justice could be done to her literary talent.

Claire's memoirs threw light not only on the Napoleonic court, but also on the youth and education of her son Charles de Rémusat. He developed political views more liberal than those of his parents.

She was the granddaughter of Jean Gravier, marquis de Vergennes, elder brother of the French Minister of Foreign Affairs and Chief Minister of King Louis XVI, Charles Gravier, comte de Vergennes.

== Works ==
- Paul de Rémusat, ed. (1880). Memoirs of Madame Rémusat 1802-1808. D. Appleton and Company. "de Remusat."
- Frances Cashel Hoey; John Lillie; Paul Louis Étienne de Rémusat, eds. (1881). A Selection from the Letters of Madame de Rémusat to Her Husband and Son, from 1804 to 1813. D. Appleton and Company. "de Remusat."
