= Claudio Sorrentino =

Italian actor (1945–2021)

- Born: 18 July 1945; Rome, Italy
- Died: 16 February 2021 (aged 75); Rome, Italy
- Occupations: Actor; voice actor; dubbing director; television presenter
- Years active: 1950–2021
- Spouse: Manuela Artari (m. 1968; died 2010)
- Relatives: Liliana Sorrentino (sister)

Claudio Sorrentino (18 July 1945 – 16 February 2021) was an Italian actor, voice actor and television presenter.

== Biography ==
Born in Rome and the second child of Arduino and Anna Sorrentino, Sorrentino began his career at the age of five acting at the "Grand Hotel di Roma", singing the song O mese de Rose, composed by Roberto Murolo. After his performance, Lilly D'Eramo (Nanni Eramo's wife) asked Claudio's mother to take him and his sisters to a specialized school. At the age of six, he portrayed the role of Zi Dima in Luigi Pirandello's Giara and Medoro in Eduardo De Filippo's Sik Sik. Sorrentino performed in several theatres in Rome.

He later acted in the TV play Vita col padre e con la madre with Paolo Stoppa, Rina Morelli and Corrado Pani. During that time, Sorrentino started his career as a voice actor, dubbing a role in Italian in Delmer Daves' 1956 film The Last Wagon. As a dubbing artist, Sorrentino was the official Italian voice of John Travolta and Mel Gibson. Other actors he dubbed include Bruce Willis, Sylvester Stallone, Willem Dafoe, Ryan O'Neal, Ron Howard, Jeff Bridges, Mickey Rourke and many more. In his animated roles, he voiced Dodger in the Italian dub of Oliver & Company, Gargamel in The Smurfs, and Mickey Mouse from 1978 to 1981.

Sorrentino also worked as a host for Italian TV programs such as È permesso?, Tandem and Troppo forti.

=== Personal life ===
At the age of 23, Sorrentino married Manuela Artari, to whom he was married until her death in 2010. He also had three sisters, including voice actress Liliana Sorrentino.

Sorrentino died on 16 February 2021, at the age of 75, after contracting COVID-19 during the pandemic in Italy.

== Filmography ==
=== Cinema ===
Year	Title	Role(s)	Notes
1971	La ragazza dalle mani di corallo		
1974	Spogliati, protesta, uccidi - Quando la preda è l'uomo		
1978	Il giorno dei cristalli	Dusan Polajac	
1979	L'anno dei gatti	Leopoldo	
1980	Masoch	Armand	
1981	Storia senza parole		Short film
2001	Momo	Commissioner (voice)	Animated film

=== Television ===
Year	Title	Role(s)	Network	Notes
1960	Vita col padre e con la madre	Whitney	Rai 1	TV miniseries
1975	Diagnosis	Doctor Martino	Rai 1	TV miniseries
1980	Il fascino dell'insolito	Harry	Rai 2	TV series
1981	Fregoli	Virgilio Crescenzi	Rai 1	TV miniseries
1984	I ragazzi di celluloide 2	Gianni	Rai 2	TV miniseries

=== Dubbing ===
==== Films (Animation, Italian dub) ====
Year	Title	Role(s)	Ref
1970	The White Snake Enchantress	Xu Xian (1970 dubbing)	
1981	The Fox and the Hound	Dinky	
1988	Oliver & Company	Dodger	

==== Films (Live action, Italian dub) ====
Year	Title	Role(s)	Original actor	Ref
1969	Alice's Restaurant	Arlo Guthrie	Arlo Guthrie	
1970	Brewster McCloud	Brewster McCloud	Bud Cort	
1970	The Strawberry Statement	Simon	Bruce Davison	
1970	Love Story	Oliver Barrett IV	Ryan O'Neal	
1971	Harold and Maude	Harold Parker Chasen	Bud Cort	
1972	Godzilla vs. Gigan	Anguirus	Koetsu Omiya	
1973	Bang the Drum Slowly	Bruce Pearson	Robert De Niro	
1973	The Day of the Jackal	Forger	Ronald Pickup	
1977	Saturday Night Fever	Bobby C.	Barry Miller	
1977	Saturday Night Fever	Tony Manero (2002 redub)	John Travolta	
1978	Animal House	Eric "Otter" Stratton	Tim Matheson	
1978	Grease	Sonny LaTierri	Michael Tucci	
1978	Grease	Danny Zuko (2002 redub)	John Travolta	
1979	The Black Hole	Lieutenant Charlie Pizer	Joseph Bottoms	
1980	Popeye	Castor Oyl	Donovan Scott	
1980	North Sea Hijack	Lord Privy Seal Tipping	Jeremy Clyde	
1980	La ripetente fa l'occhietto al preside	Carlo Lucignani	Leo Colonna	
1980	La dottoressa ci sta col colonnello	Lieutenant Lancetti	Bruno Minniti	
1980	Friday the 13th	Ned Rubenstein	Mark Nelson	
1982	Tron	Kevin Flynn	Jeff Bridges	
1983	The Right Stuff	Gordon Cooper	Dennis Quaid	
1983	Two of a Kind	Zack Melon	John Travolta	
1983	Staying Alive	Tony Manero	John Travolta	
1984	Streets of Fire	Raven Shaddock	Willem Dafoe	
1985	Sid and Nancy	Sid Vicious	Gary Oldman	
1987	Lethal Weapon	Martin Riggs	Mel Gibson	
1987	Julia and Julia	Paolo	Gabriel Byrne	
1987	Love & Passion	Ciro	Luigi Laezza	
1988	Tequila Sunrise	Dale "Mac" McKussic	Mel Gibson	
1988	The Unbearable Lightness of Being	Tomas	Daniel Day-Lewis	
1988	The Last Temptation of Christ	Jesus	Willem Dafoe	
1988	Homeboy	Johnny Walker	Mickey Rourke	
1988	Tucker: The Man and His Dream	Preston Tucker	Jeff Bridges	
1989	Triumph of the Spirit	Salamo Arouch	Willem Dafoe	
1989	Lethal Weapon 2	Martin Riggs	Mel Gibson	
1989	Time to Kill	Lieutenant Enrico Silvestri	Nicolas Cage	
1989	Scenes from the Class Struggle in Beverly Hills	Juan	Robert Beltran	
1990	Bird on a Wire	Richard "Rick" Jarmin	Mel Gibson	
1992	Lethal Weapon 3	Martin Riggs	Mel Gibson	
1992	Forever Young	Daniel McCormick	Mel Gibson	
1992	White Sands	Gorman Lennox	Mickey Rourke	
1993	Fearless	Max Klein	Jeff Bridges	
1993	The Man Without a Face	Justin McLeod	Mel Gibson	
1993	Body of Evidence	Frank Dulaney	Willem Dafoe	
1994	Pulp Fiction	Vincent Vega	John Travolta	
1994	Maverick	Bret Maverick	Mel Gibson	
1994	The River Wild	Tom Hartman	David Strathairn	
1995	Get Shorty	Chili Palmer	John Travolta	
1995	Braveheart	William Wallace	Mel Gibson	
1995	Die Hard with a Vengeance	John McClane	Bruce Willis	
1996	Bogus	Bogus	Gérard Depardieu	
1996	Strangled Lives	Francesco De Luca	Vincent Lindon	
1996	Broken Arrow	Major Vic "Deak" Deakins	John Travolta	
1996	Michael	Michael	John Travolta	
1996	Last Man Standing	John Smith	Bruce Willis	
1996	Ransom	Tom Mullen	Mel Gibson	
1996	Jane Eyre	Edward Rochester	William Hurt	
1997	She's So Lovely	Joey Giamonti	John Travolta	
1997	Mad City	Sam Baily	John Travolta	
1997	Cop Land	Freddy Heflin	Sylvester Stallone	
1997	Conspiracy Theory	Jerry Fletcher	Mel Gibson	
1998	Lethal Weapon 4	Martin Riggs	Mel Gibson	
1998	Primary Colors	Governor Jack Stanton	John Travolta	
1998	The Thin Red Line	Howard Quintard	John Travolta	
1998	A Civil Action	Jan Schlichtmann	John Travolta	
1999	Payback	Parker	Mel Gibson	
1999	The General's Daughter	Paul Brenner	John Travolta	
2000	Beautiful Joe	Joe	Billy Connolly	
2000	The Patriot	Benjamin Martin	Mel Gibson	
2000	The Million Dollar Hotel	Detective Skinner	Mel Gibson	
2000	What Women Want	Nick Marshall	Mel Gibson	
2000	Quills	Marquis de Sade	Geoffrey Rush	
2000	Battlefield Earth	Terl	John Travolta	
2000	Lucky Numbers	Russ Richards	John Travolta	
2001	Swordfish	Gabriel Shear	John Travolta	
2001	Domestic Disturbance	Frank Morrison	John Travolta	
2002	Austin Powers in Goldmember	John Travolta	John Travolta	
2002	We Were Soldiers	Hal Moore	Mel Gibson	
2002	Signs	Father Graham Hess	Mel Gibson	
2003	Daredevil	Jack Murdock	David Keith	
2003	Basic	Tom Hardy	John Travolta	
2003	Runaway Jury	Durwood Cable	Bruce Davison	
2004	A Love Song for Bobby Long	Bobby Long	John Travolta	
2005	Be Cool	Chili Palmer	John Travolta	
2005	Angel-A	Franck	Gilbert Melki	
2006	Candy	Casper	Geoffrey Rush	
2006	Notes on a Scandal	Brian Bangs	Phil Davis	
2006	Alpha Dog	Sonny Truelove	Bruce Willis	
2006	Rocky Balboa	L.C. Luco	A. J. Benza	
2006	Tristan & Isolde	Aragon	Richard Dillane	
2007	Hairspray	Edna Turnblad	John Travolta	
2007	The Hideout	Father Amy	Treat Williams	
2007	Pathfinder	Indian father	Wayne Charles Baker	
2007	The Comebacks	Freddie Wiseman	Carl Weathers	
2007	Planet Terror	Lieutenant Muldoon	Bruce Willis	
2007	Live Free or Die Hard	John McClane	Bruce Willis	
2009	The Taking of Pelham 123	Dennis 'Ryder' Ford / Mr. Blue	John Travolta	
2009	All About Steve	Hartman Hughes	Thomas Haden Church	
2009	The Smell of Success	Patrick Fitzpatrick	Billy Bob Thornton	
2010	Edge of Darkness	Thomas Craven	Mel Gibson	
2010	The Expendables	Mr. Church	Bruce Willis	
2010	My Name Is Khan	Barack Obama	Christopher B. Duncan	
2010	As Good as Dead	Reverend Kahalan	Brian Cox	
2011	The Beaver	Walter Black	Mel Gibson	
2011	The Mechanic	Arthur Bishop	Jason Statham	
2011	Water for Elephants	August Rosenbluth	Christoph Waltz	
2012	Alex Cross	Richard Brookwell	John C. McGinley	
2012	The Expendables 2	Mr. Church	Bruce Willis	
2012	Prometheus	Peter Weyland	Guy Pearce	
2013	Killing Season	Emil Kovač	John Travolta	
2013	Broken City	Mayor Nicholas Hostetler	Russell Crowe	
2013	A Good Day to Die Hard	John McClane	Bruce Willis	
2013	Parkland	Acme Brick Supervisor	Larry Jack Dotson	
2014	Pompeii	Marcus Cassius Severus	Jared Harris	
2015	The Second Best Exotic Marigold Hotel	Ty Burley	David Strathairn	
2015	Criminal Activities	Eddie	John Travolta	
2016	Blood Father	John Link	Mel Gibson	
2016	I Am Wrath	Stanley Hill / Wrath	John Travolta	
2018	Speed Kills	Ben Aronoff	John Travolta	
2018	Dragged Across Concrete	Brett Ridgeman	Mel Gibson	
2018	Acts of Violence	Detective James Avery	Bruce Willis	
2019	The Fanatic	Moose	John Travolta	
2020	Force of Nature	Ray Barrett	Mel Gibson	
2020	Fatman	Chris Cringle	Mel Gibson	

==== Television (Animation, Italian dub) ====
Year	Title	Role(s)	Notes	Ref
1978–1981	Mickey Mouse cartoons	Mickey Mouse	1978–1981 redubs	
1980	Mazinger Z	Koji Kabuto	1980–1999 editions	
1983	The Smurfs	Gargamel	Recurring role (season 2)	
2000	The Simpsons	Ron Howard, Mel Gibson, John Travolta	2 episodes	

==== Television (Live action, Italian dub) ====
Year	Title	Role(s)	Notes	Original actor	Ref
1977–1981	Happy Days	Richie Cunningham	Main cast (seasons 1–7)	Ron Howard	
1981–1992	Dallas	Bobby Ewing	Main cast	Patrick Duffy	
1985	A.D.	Nero	TV miniseries	Anthony Andrews	
1992–1993	Step by Step	Frank Lambert	Main cast (season 1)	Patrick Duffy	
1994–1995	ER	Dr. John 'Tag' Taglieri	11 episodes	Rick Rossovich	
1996	Samson and Delilah	Samson	TV miniseries	Eric Thal	
1998	Merlin	King Vortigern	TV miniseries	Rutger Hauer	
1998	Dallas: War of the Ewings	Bobby Ewing	TV film	Patrick Duffy	
1999	Alice in Wonderland	The Mock Turtle	TV film	Gene Wilder	
2016	The People v. O. J. Simpson: American Crime Story	Robert Shapiro	Main cast	John Travolta	
