= Nina Garbiras =

American actress

- Born: September 9, 1964 (age 61); New York City, United States
- Occupations: Actress, Designer
- Years active: 1990s–

Nina Garbiras (born September 9, 1964) is an American actress. She is best known for her TV role as Andrea Little on the first season of NBC's award-winning series Boomtown.

== Early life ==
Garbiras was born in New York, and traces her heritage to the Basque region of northeastern Spain and southwestern France. She grew up in New York and later in northern California. She attended Hyde Junior High School in Cupertino, California and went on to graduate from Cupertino High School. She read for her Bachelor of Science degree at the University of Santa Clara, a Jesuit university in California's Silicon Valley region, where she majored in psychology. She later studied dramatic art at the L'Ecole de Claude Mathieu in Paris, France. She lives in New York City.

== Career ==
=== Theatre ===
Garbiras's professional stage acting career began in the chorus of a performance of La traviata at the Opera San José in San Jose, California. She also appeared in a production of Jesus Christ Superstar at De Anza College in Cupertino, California. Later, whilst living in Paris, France Garbiras appeared in small productions in that city playing the roles of Marie in Night Games and of Pamela in Peter Nichols's A Day in the Death of Joe Egg – both of which were staged at the tiny, 120-seat Theatre Clavel on the Rue Clavel. She also appeared as Roxanne in Bajazet at the Théâtre de la rue Olive.

Garbiras subsequently moved from France to London, England where she worked in fringe theatre appearing in Prison’d in a Parlour playing Lydia at the Southwark Playhouse, London Stories for Wink Productions playing Betty Fred Hiphop, Waking Beauty playing the Red Fairy for Arts Threshold, Babbett in Max Frisch's The Fire Raisers for the Break Out Theatre Company, and Lydia in Spike Heels for the Flipside Studio.

Upon her return to the United States, Garbiras understudied the roles of Josie Hines (played by Suzanne Cryer) and Sammii (played by Tony Award-winning actress Katie Finneran) in the Broadway production of Neil Simon's Proposals at the Broadhurst Theatre, New York which ran from November 6, 1997, to January 11, 1998.

=== Motion pictures ===
Garbiras’ debut motion picture appearance was in the lead role of Catherine in director Sal Ciaverello's first professional film Blue Shadows, a short film in the horror genre about monstrous devils that hide in moonlight shadows. It was shot on 16mm in 1994 but the film remained unreleased until 1997 when it was screened for the first time in New York. The film was acquired for release on DVD and VHS by EI Independent Cinema in 2001.

Garbiras has also appeared in the French-language Swiss film Fin de Siècle playing the part of Alison, in New York documentary filmmaker Alison Swan's dramatic feature debut Mixing Nia which was shown at the 1998 New York Film Festival, and in Emily Baer's Guy's Guide to Marrying Money. All those films were released in the same year – 1998. In 2000, she appeared in You Can Count on Me, playing Nancy Everett, the pregnant wife of Matthew Broderick's character.

Garbiras’ biggest motion picture role to date is that of Janine Creedlow in Bruiser (2000) a horror picture directed by George A. Romero and screened at the Berlin Film Festival.

=== Television ===
Garbiras has made numerous network television appearances in the United States. She appeared in Episode 5 of the sixth season of ABC's highly successful NYPD Blue which first aired in November 1998; as a guest on single episodes of NBC's Lateline; on ABC's The Mike O’Malley Show and in 2000 in Grapevine on CBS television. She also appeared in the pilot episodes of NBC's Cold Feet and Fox's Traffic and The Only Living Boy in New York—none of which were picked up as a series. Her first televised series was Fox's The $treet (2000–1), pulled from the airwaves after seven episodes were aired. She appeared as idealistic schoolteacher and later, best-selling author Beth Greenaway on Leap Years for the cable station Showtime in 2001 and later, in what is perhaps her most successful role, reporter Andrea Little on NBC/DreamWorks’ series Boomtown in 2002-3. Garbiras has described the Little character as "tough, articulate and headstrong". Her character did not return for the ill-fated second series of the show (it was cancelled before filming was completed and only a few episodes were screened) because the writers could not decide what to do with her character. In 2006 she appeared in a single episode of Dr. Vegas, a CBS series starring the popular actor Rob Lowe.

=== Music ===
Garbiras has also worked professionally as a singer. In addition to her roles in the opera La traviata and the musical Jesus Christ Superstar mentioned above, Garbiras sang with AOR group The Paul Godfrey Band in the late 1980s.

== Acclaim ==
Garbiras’ portrayal of reporter Andrea Little in NBC/DreamWorks’ Boomtown drew immediate acclaim. New York Magazine commented that the character could be the first print journalist in a decade to be portrayed in prime-time television as having principles and decency. The magazine compared Garbiras favourably to Golden Globe Award-winning actress Mary-Louise Parker.

Garbiras was listed fourth in Netscape Celebrity's March 2005 ranking of "Top 10 Gutsy Gals" beating out better known TV actresses like Sarah Michelle Gellar (Buffy the Vampire Slayer) and Jacqueline Obradors (NYPD Blue), amongst others.

== Second career ==
In recent years, Garbiras changed careers. She opened an antique furniture store and design business, specializing in English and French pieces. In August 2008 Garbiras told New York's Daily News that she had chosen the location of her store "to be close to the artists who live and create here." In the late 2010s, Garbiras' business pivoted to design work.
