= De Girolamo =

De Girolamo is the name of several people:

- Danilo De Girolamo (1956–2012), Italian voice actor
- Diego De Girolamo (born 1995), professional footballer
- Nunzia De Girolamo (born 1975), Italian lawyer
- Scott, De Girolamo (born 1964), scientist and CEO of CGPC Solutions
