= Red triangle (Channel 4) =

Adult content warning used by Channel 4 from 1986 to 1987

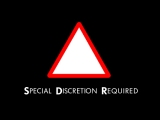
A red triangle of this sort preceded broadcasts, warning viewers that special discretion was required.

The red triangle was a content warning system employed by mainstream terrestrial British television broadcaster Channel 4 for a brief period from 1986 to 1987. A similar warning had been briefly used by ATV in the 1970s (a white rectangle) - to warn viewers of potentially disturbing material.

The channel showed a number of mainly 18 certificate art films in the early hours of the morning as part of the "red triangle" series, gaining unexpectedly large audiences. After lobbying from newspapers and pressure groups this method of identifying such material was discontinued.

== The red triangle broadcasts ==
The channel, launched in December 1982, hoped to gain a reputation as a relatively avant-garde alternative to the existing terrestrial stations. It compiled a list of provocative films, generally cult film or art-house and mostly in another language, and entered into negotiation with independent TV regulator the Independent Broadcasting Authority (IBA) with an eye to showing them. The films, all of which had been theatrically exhibited under British Board of Film Censorship's 'X' (or later '18') certificates, had never been shown on British television before. Their content transcended that which had hitherto been permitted by the UK's TV censors.

The series began in September 1986 in a very late slot (with most films beginning after midnight). Broadcasts were preceded by a warning, saying "Special Discretion Required" and displaying a full-screen logo of a red triangle with a white centre (the standard scheme used for warning signs in the UK). To prevent viewers who missed the warning at the beginning from later being unwittingly exposed to the adult content of the film, a smaller red triangle was continually displayed in the top left corner of the screen throughout the broadcast. This quickly led to the broadcasts being informally known as the "red triangle films".

The broadcasts proved to be controversial even before they began. Several newspapers branded some of the films to be shown "video nasties", and once broadcasts began the morality campaigner Mary Whitehouse became involved. her National Viewers' and Listeners' Association campaigned vociferously against the broadcasts and lobbied parliament and the IBA, calling for the broadcasts to be ended.

The outcry over the red triangle series had entirely the opposite effect than the objectors had intended; the opening film, the grisly surreal comedy Themroc, garnered over two million viewers. Later films (mostly those whose TVTimes synopses sounded racy) gained viewerships of over three million, figures which dwarfed those of the other channels still broadcasting that late (which carried fare of very limited appeal and educational programming from the Open University). Some critics contended that the whole series was a cynical attempt to wilfully stir controversy, and in practice many viewers discovered that "softcore" against which campaigners had railed was in fact genuine art cinema (and not the titillation for which they had stayed up late). With viewing figures latterly declining, and press opposition remaining strong, Channel 4 quietly discontinued the red triangle the year after it had been introduced.

== The films ==
Date	Title	year	Country of origin	Language(s)	Director	Writer	Notes
19 September 1986	Themroc	1973	France	No dialogue	Claude Faraldo		This surreal tale of a disgruntled labourer who degenerates into an urban caveman gained an 'X' certificate in 1973.
3 October 1986	Pastoral Hide and Seek	1974	Japan	Japanese	Shūji Terayama (寺山 修司)		Also known as Death in the Country, original title: 田園に死す (Den-en ni shisu)
10 October 1986	Throw Away Your Books, Rally in the Streets	1971	Japan	Japanese	Shūji Terayama (寺山 修司)		Original title: 書を捨てよ町へ出よう (Sho o Suteyo, Machi e Deyo)
17 October 1986	Identification of a Woman	1982	Italy, France	Italian, English, French	Michelangelo Antonioni	Michelangelo Antonioni, Gérard Brach	Original title: Identificazione di una donna '18' (1983 - theatrical; 1995 - video)
24 October 1986	Pixote	1980	Brazil	Brazilian Portuguese	Héctor Babenco	Héctor Babenco, Jorge Durán	Includes harrowing scenes of torture and sexual assault. Original title: Pixote: A Lei do Mais Fraco '18' (1982 - theatrical; 1988 - video)
31 October 1986	The Clinic	1982	Australia	English	David Stevens	Greg Millin	Rated '15' by the BBFC in 1983; '18' on video in 1988.
14 November 1986	Montenegro, or: Pigs and Pearls	1981	Sweden, UK	English, Swedish	Dušan Makavejev	Dušan Makavejev, Branko Vučićević	
28 November 1986	Die Berührte	1981	West Germany	German	Helma Sanders-Brahms	Rita G, Helma Sanders-Brahms	Based on a letter received from a schizophrenic woman as she writes about her life, giving herself to the castoffs of Berlin
10 January 1987	Out of the Blue	1980	Canada	English	Dennis Hopper	Leonard Yakir, Brenda Nielson	
17 January 1987	The Wall	1983	Turkey, France	Turkish, French	Yılmaz Güney		Original title: Duvar

== Legacy ==
Several years later around 1995, Channel 4 instituted a late-night programming slot (entitled "The Red Light Zone") in which it showed a variety of adult-oriented programmes with more overt sexual content, mixing avant-garde material such as the works of photographer Robert Mapplethorpe with more unabashedly salacious content. By this time Whitehouse's influence had declined, and the general moral panic over "smut" and "video nasties" had largely subsided, such that the Red Light Zone proceeded without great controversy.

More generally, the experiment showed there was a considerable appetite in the British viewing public for adult, sexually themed programming, and the following decade saw Channel 4 increasingly resorting to more blatantly sexual programmes to attract viewers. By showing that it was possible for TV to get viewership of several millions after midnight, the red triangle experiment (along with late-night comedy programme Who Dares Wins, which notably parodied the red triangle films) went some way to establishing a late-night "after the pub" slot. This continues (particularly on Channel 4 and its competitor Channel 5), although the content is more inclined toward the bawdy and laddish than to the red-triangle series' art house films.
