= 37th Venice International Film Festival =

Italian film festival in 1980

- Festival poster
- Location: Venice, Italy
- Founded: 1932
- Awards: Golden Lion: Atlantic City; Gloria
- Festival date: 28 August – 8 September 1980
- Website: Website

Venice Film Festival chronology
- 38th 36th

The 37th annual Venice International Film Festival was held on 28 August to 8 September, 1980.

Italian screenwriter Suso Cecchi d'Amico was the Jury President of the main competition. The Golden Lion winners were: Atlantic City directed by Louis Malle and Gloria directed by John Cassavetes.

== Jury ==
The following people comprised the 1980 jury:

- Suso Cecchi d'Amico, Italian screenwriter - Jury President
- Youssef Chahine, Egyptian filmmaker
- Michel Ciment, French film critic
- Umberto Eco, Italian and philosopher
- Gillo Pontecorvo, Italian filmmaker
- Andrew Sarris, American film critic
- George Stevens Jr., American filmmaker and producer
- Margarethe von Trotta, West German filmmaker

== Official Sections ==
=== Main Competition ===
| English title | Original title | Director(s) | Production country |
|---|---|---|---|
| The Age of the Earth | A Idade da Terra | Glauber Rocha | Brazil |
| Alexander the Great | Ο Μεγαλέξανδρος | Theo Angelopoulos | Greece |
| Atlantic City | | Louis Malle | France, Canada |
| Eugenio | Voltati Eugenio | Luigi Comencini | Italy |
| Gloria | | John Cassavetes | United States |
| Going in Style | | Martin Brest | United States |
| The Human Factor | | Otto Preminger | United Kingdom |
| The Little Mermaid | La petite sirène | Roger Andrieux | France |
| Long Days | Al-ayyam al-tawila | Tewfik Saleh | Iraq |
| Melvin and Howard | | Jonathan Demme | United States |
| Phobia | | John Huston | Canada |
| Richard's Things | | Anthony Harvey | United Kingdom |
| Story of an Unknown Man | Рассказ неизвестного человека | Vytautas Žalakevičius | Soviet Union |
| Two Lions in the Sun | Deux lions au soleil | Claude Faraldo | France |

=== Out of Competition ===
| English title | Original title | Director(s) | Production country |
|---|---|---|---|
| The Black Stallion | | Carroll Ballard | United States |
| The Empire Strikes Back | | Irvin Kershner | United States |
| First Step | Premier pas | Mohamed Bouamari | Algeria, France |
| Lightning Over Water | | Wim Wenders | West Germany, Sweden |
| Loulou | | Maurice Pialat | France |
| My American Uncle | | Alain Resnais | France |

=== Officina veneziana ===
| English title | Original title | Director(s) | Production country |
|---|---|---|---|
| Charlotte | | Frans Weisz | Netherlands |
| Guns | | Robert Kramer | France |
| Les nouveaux romantiques | | Mohamed Benayat | France |
| Lena Rais | | Christian Rischert | West Germany |
| Love Between the Raindrops | Lásky mezi kapkami deště | Karel Kachyna | Czechoslovakia |
| Masoch | | Franco Brogi Taviani | Italy |
| Men or Not Men | Uomini e no | Valentino Orsini | Italy |
| Opera prima | | Fernando Trueba | Spain |
| The Other Woman | L'altra donna | Peter Del Monte | Italy |
| Oxalá | | António-Pedro Vasconcelos | Portugal |
| Petrijin venac | | Srdjan Karanovic | Yugoslavia |
| Pilgrim, Farewell | | Michael Roemer | United States |
| A Priceless Day | Ajándék ez a nap | Péter Gothár | Hungary |
| The Girl from Millelire Street | La ragazza di via Mille lire | Gianni Serra | Italy |
| La répétition générale | | Werner Schroeter | West Germany |
| Sons of the Wind | Les enfants du vent | Brahim Tsaki | Algeria |
| That's Life | C'est la vie | Paul Vecchiali | France |
| The Uprising | Der Aufstand | Peter Lilienthal | West Germany |

== Official Awards ==
=== Main Competition ===
- Golden Lion:
  - Atlantic City by Louis Malle
  - Gloria by John Cassavetes
