= Catherine Lachens =

French actress (1945–2023)

Catherine Lachens (2 September 1945 – 27 September 2023) was a French actress. She died on 27 September 2023, at the age of 78.

== Filmography ==
=== Film ===
- 1972: What a Flash! de Jean-Michel Barjol : une participante
- 1973: L'Histoire très bonne et très joyeuse de Colinot trousse-chemise de Nina Companeez : la paysanne
- 1974: Ariane de Pierre-Jean de San Bartolomé (inédit) : Erato
- 1975: Flic Story de Jacques Deray : Jenny
- 1975: L'Incorrigible de Philippe de Broca : la fille au bureau des éducateurs
- 1975: La Bulle de Raphaël Rebibo : Lola Lamaret
- 1976: Attention les yeux ! de Gérard Pirès : Laurence, dite Lolo, la scripte
- 1976: Monsieur Albert de Jacques Renard : Roseline
- 1976: Silence... on tourne ! de Roger Coggio : Paulette Fromenteau
- 1977 : Le Gang de Jacques Deray : Janine
- 1977: Violette et François de Jacques Rouffio : Carla Isalvi
- 1977: Dis bonjour à la dame de Michel Gérard : Madame Jeannot, la voisine
- 1977: Monsieur Papa de Philippe Monnier : Mademoiselle Carpentier
- 1977: Mort d'un pourri de Georges Lautner : (non créditée)
- 1978 : La Jument vapeur de Joyce Buñuel : l'amie business-woman
- 1978: Le Dernier Amant romantique de Just Jaeckin : une amie de Robert
- 1978: L'Honorable Société d'Anielle Weinberger : Claudia
- 1978: Ils sont fous ces sorciers de Georges Lautner : Thérèse Picard
- 1978: Je suis timide mais je me soigne de Pierre Richard : la routière
- 1979: Flic ou voyou de Georges Lautner : Simone Langlois
- 1979: Je te tiens, tu me tiens par la barbichette de Jean Yanne : l'assistante-réalisateur
- 1979: Bête mais discipliné de Claude Zidi : Ingrid Cochy
- 1979: Le Divorcement de Pierre Barouh : Maître Larose, conseillère matrimoniale
- 1979: Le Toubib de Pierre Granier-Deferre : Zoa
- 1979: La Gueule de l'autre de Pierre Tchernia : Florence
- 1980: Girls de Just Jaeckin
- 1980: La Banquière de Francis Girod : Madame Radignac (coupée au montage)
- 1980: Two Lions in the Sun de Claude Faraldo : Babette
- 1982: T'es folle ou quoi ? de Michel Gérard : Louise, la journaliste météo
- 1982: On s'en fout, nous on s'aime de Michel Gérard : la mère de Grégory
- 1983: Une nouvelle chaîne d'Éric Bitoun (court métrage)
- 1983: Le Prix du danger d'Yves Boisset : Madeleine
- 1983: Ça va pas être triste de Pierre Sisser : commissaire Lanvin
- 1983: Flics de choc de Jean-Pierre Desagnat : Barbara, la barmaid du Cormoran
- 1984: La Bonne dose d'Éric Bitoun (court métrage)
- 1984: Un amour de Swann de Volker Schlöndorff : la tante
- 1984: Aldo et Junior de Patrick Schulmann : la dermatologue
- 1984: Le Sang des autres de Claude Chabrol : Madame Grant
- 1986: Rosa la rose, fille publique de Paul Vecchiali : « Quarante »
- 1987: La Vie dissolue de Gérard Floque de Georges Lautner : la psychologue d'entreprise
- 1987: Les Deux Crocodiles de Joël Séria : Greta, la femme du vétérinaire
- 1988: In extremis d'Olivier Lorsac
- 1989: Rouge Venise d'Étienne Périer : la Giro
- 1990: Le Sixième Doigt d'Henri Duparc : Carole
- 1991: Le Cri du cochon, d'Alain Guesnier :
- 1992: La Belle Histoire de Claude Lelouch : la chasseuse de tête
- 1994: Les Frères Gravet de René Féret
- 1995: Gazon maudit de Josiane Balasko : Fabienne, la patronne du Sopha
- 1996: Les Bidochon de Serge Korber : la directrice de l'agence matrimoniale
- 1996: Éxtasis de Mariano Barroso
- 1997: Le Nègre de François Lévy-Kuentz (court métrage)
- 2000: Il est difficile de tuer quelqu'un, même un lundi d'Éric Valette (court métrage) : la vieille
- 2000: Les Morsures de l'aube d'Antoine de Caunes : rôle coupé au montage
- 2001: Dernière séance de Vincent Garenq (court métrage) : Marick
- 2001: Confession d'un dragueur d'Alain Soral : la femme au chapeau
- 2003: Confessions de minuit de Pablo Guirado Garcia (court métrage) :
- 2004: Un beau jour, un coiffeur de Gilles Bindi (court métrage) : la cliente du salon
- 2004: À vot' bon cœur de Paul Vecchiali : Madame Bisance
- 2007: Absence de Kevin Lecomte (court métrage) : la mère
- 2009: Les Liqueurs d'Alice de Katia Scarton-Kim (court métrage) :
- 2012: Bonjour madame, bonjour monsieur de Mohamed Fekrane (court métrage) : la voisine
- 2013: Les Beaux Jours de Marion Vernoux : Sylviane
- 2015: Pension complète de Florent Emilio Siri : maman de François
