= Nothing like the Holidays =

Nothing Like the Holidays
- Theatrical release poster
- Directed by: Alfredo De Villa
- Written by: Rick Najera; Ted Perkins; Alison Swan
- Produced by: George Tillman Jr. Robert Teitel
- Starring: Luis Guzmán; John Leguizamo; Debra Messing; Alfred Molina; Freddy Rodriguez; Melonie Diaz; Vanessa Ferlito; Jay Hernandez; Elizabeth Peña
- Cinematography: Scott Kevan
- Edited by: John Coniglio; Amy E. Duddleston
- Music by: Paul Oakenfold
- Distributed by: Overture Films
- Release date: December 12, 2008
- Running time: 98 minutes
- Country: United States
- Languages: English; Spanish
- Box office: $7.5 million

Nothing Like the Holidays is a 2008 film about a Puerto Rican family living in the area of Humboldt Park, Chicago facing what may be their last Christmas together. It was directed by Alfredo De Villa, written by Rick Najera, Ted Perkins, and Alison Swan, and features an ensemble cast. The film was released on December 12, 2008.

== Plot ==
At Chicago's O'Hare International Airport, a group of Marines have just returned to the US from Iraq. As the Marines leave, one Marine remains and makes his way towards the exit. The Marine's name is Jesse Rodriguez (Freddy Rodriguez). The film cuts to a house where a man, Edy Rodriguez (Alfred Molina) is on a ladder nailing up a welcome home sign for Jesse. The woman, his wife, Anna Rodriguez (Elizabeth Peña) gives him a rather disgruntled look before leaving to prepare for Jesse's return.

Back at the airport, Jesse finally meets up with his friend and cousin Johnny (Luis Guzmán) and Ozzy (Jay Hernandez), who have come to pick him up. On the way to his fathers store, Jesse takes off his eye-patch to reveal that he can still see, but the area around his eye is badly injured. After some prompting from Johnny and Ozzy, he reveals that he was the lucky one, as his friend Lenny was not as lucky and Jesse feels some guilt for this. On the way, the three pass a park and Jesse tells them to stop. The park was their childhood playground and the three take a little time off to play a game of baseball and reminisce. While at the park, Ozzy spots Alexis (Manny Pérez), the man who killed his brother and has recently been released from prison. Ozzy stares at Alexis, and Alexis stares back, however, before Ozzy is able to make his way to Alexis, both Jesse and Johnny hold him back.

Jesse's sister Roxanna (Vanessa Ferlito) arrives by taxi, although everyone assumes she came in a limo because they all assume that she made it big in Hollywood as an actress. Jesse's brother Mauricio (John Leguizamo) also arrives, along with his wife Sarah (Debra Messing). Sarah greets Anna and it is evident that she is not exactly comfortable around her in-laws but she is making an effort, even speaking a bit of Spanish. However, the topic drifts towards children and Anna makes it very clear that she wants grandchildren, but Sarah is a very business driven woman and isn't ready for kids, this causes some tension between Sarah, Anna, and Mauricio. After things settle down, everyone sits down and begins to catch up and each person’s story is brought up: Jesse has just returned from a three-year tour in Iraq and is being prepared by Edy to take up the family business; Roxanna is waiting on news regarding a new TV deal; and Mauricio is an attorney while Sarah works in finance. The conversation moves towards Jesse's experience in Iraq, but he does not want to talk about it (important later). Soon after, Marissa (Melonie Diaz), her son Hector (Alexander Bautista), and her boyfriend Fernando (Ramses Jimenez) arrive. Marissa is Roxanna's best friend from childhood, and Jesse's ex-girlfriend. It is evident that Jesse still has feelings for Marissa and vice versa, but there is tension in the air.

After everyone has arrived, they all sit down for Christmas dinner. Edy is about to give a toast to everyone but gets a call. Anna assumes he is cheating on her, as he has done in the past, and loudly proclaims that she wants a divorce. Edy reacts with little emotion, saying that if it is what Anna wants then he can't really do anything about it.

Later that night, Mauricio is up in the attic thinking about the night's events when Roxanna shows up. The two share a drink and Jesse shows up. The siblings reminisce about their childhood and what the future will be like after their parents divorce. Both Roxanna and Jesse are relatively neutral on the matter, but Mauricio is very against them. Being the only one of the three to be married, he believes that after 36 years of marriage, their parents have to have at least some love for each other, and that there is always a chance to salvage what remains of their marriage.

In the morning, Jesse catches up with Marissa while she is walking to work. She still hasn't forgiven him for leaving her several years ago. As it turns out, Jesse didn't want to stay in town and follow in his father's footsteps and ended up enlisting in the Marines. While in Iraq, his unit was holed up in a building for the night, Lenny offered to take Jesse's watch so he can grab something to eat. While Jesse is getting some food, a rocket propelled grenade is shot into the building and Lenny is killed, while everyone else is injured. Ever since then, Jesse blames himself for Lenny's death since it was supposed to be his watch, and his life that would be lost. Marissa sympathizes and forgives him.

Back at the house, Mauricio is attempting to get Anna and Edy back together by bringing over their priest, Father Torres (Manny Sosa). Anna returns home and Mauricio brings her into the kitchen. Anna is clearly drunk and is very upset. Another argument ensues and everyone is at each other's throats. Mauricio argues with Anna regarding having children, Roxanna reveals that shes not a star and can barely make ends meet. Both Mauricio and Roxanna think Jesse has it easy, since he gets the store to manage as soon as he returned. However, Jesse doesn't want to manage the store and his guilt over Lenny's death has been haunting him since his return. After more arguing, everyone leaves. Roxanna, Jesse and Mauricio end up in a bar to drink/party to vent off some tension.

Sarah gets back to the house and finds out that everyone has left. Edy offers to give her a ride to the bar where everyone is. While driving Sarah to the bar to meet the others, Edy appears to have a heart attack and stomps on the brakes. Luckily, they skid into a parking area and no one is injured; Sarah is able to fetch Edy's medication from the glove box in time. As Sarah looks at the bottles, she realizes that Edy is really very ill and that that's the reason he's getting those phone calls (the doctor). Edy makes her promise to not tell anyone, since he doesn't want anyone to worry so they can enjoy the holidays.

At the bar, everyone takes the chance to have some fun, drinking and dancing. Sarah gets hammered and starts dancing with Mauricio. Everyone is having a blast and Jesse takes the time to talk to Marissa. Roxanna, receives a call from her agent (with no actual news regarding the new part), goes outside to answer the phone and have a smoke. While Roxanna is out having a smoke, Ozzy comes out to talk to her. Ozzy likes Roxanna, but she is a bit apprehensive as she sees him as a gang-member type person, although Marissa has noted that he hasn't been part of that crowd for quite some time.

Roxanna and Ozzy go to the local ice rink to talk, and Roxanna tells him that she really isn't much of a star since she has only had a few small roles on TV and in commercials and can't really get a big part. Ozzy assures her that she will get her big break, but she is not so sure. Roxanna mentions returning home since her career isn't going anywhere, and her mom may need her around during the divorce. Ozzy is happy that Roxanna may stay, but is supportive of her career.

The next day, everyone prepares to have a little Christmas carol parade, where people travel from house to house caroling, and people join along the way until nearly the entire neighborhood has joined in. The parade ends with everyone arriving at the church for a big party/dinner. Everyone is dancing and having fun. Fernando goes off to get something to drink and Jesse asks Marissa for a dance. The two begins to get close and Jesse leans in to kiss her, just as Fernando lunges in and hits Jesse. Jesse pummels Fernando before his friends drag him off. While this is happening, Ozzy can't take it anymore and leaves to confront Alexis. Alexis is returning home with his mother and sees Ozzy. Knowing what Ozzy has come to do, he tells his mother to go into the house and make dinner, while he goes outside with Ozzy. Outside, Alexis tells Ozzy that he's ready to die, and has been for many years while in prison. Ozzy is visibly struggling to decide whether or not to kill Alexis, just then, his phone rings, it's Roxanna. Ozzy gives up, and lets Alexis live, and leaves to meet Roxanna. Ozzy and Roxanna go to the river, where he gets rid of the gun, and the two kiss.

Edy is now alone in the kitchen, drinking. Jesse and Mauricio return home and join their father, each drinking to their own little problems. Edy, decides to do one last thing for Anna and finally cut down that tree so the three go outside and secure the tree to a chain that is connected to the rear bumper of Edy's car. Edy guns the engine but the rear bumper comes off and he crashes into a parked car, injuring himself.

Anna calls the ambulance and Edy is rushed off to the hospital. Before the ambulance leaves, Sarah runs out to Anna and hands her all of Edy's medications since she's the only one who knows how serious his health is. The whole family is at the hospital to check on Edy. It turns out that Edy has cancer, it's serious but he's being treated for it. Anna finally realizes that Edy was not cheating on her, and that the Susan that Edy was talking to was actually his oncologist. The couple make their peace and profess love for each other, and then Anna smacks Edy for being stupid and not telling her sooner.

Back at the house, Anna is teaching Roxanna and Sarah how to cook with moderate success. Roxanna gets a call from her agent, and when she returns, it appears as she has not gotten the part. Outside the house, Ozzy comes by to talk to Roxanna and she reveals that she actually did get the part, but it wasn't a very big part anyway, and she thought it would be best to stick with her family during these times, so she turned down the part.

Jesse visits Marissa to drop off some Christmas presents and to apologize for his behavior the previous night. She forgives him, but she has a relationship with Fernando now and a happy family life. Jesse concedes and wishes her a happy life. After leaving, Jesse sits on a park bench, making a call to Lenny's parents to tell them about their son and how he died so he can get closure and move on.

After being discharged from the hospital, Edy takes Jesse to the family store.

== Cast ==
- Alfred Molina as Edy Rodriguez
- Elizabeth Peña as Anna Rodriguez, Edy's wife
- John Leguizamo as Mauricio Rodriguez, Edy & Anna's first son
- Debra Messing as Sarah Rodriguez, Mauricio's wife
- Freddy Rodriguez as Jesse Rodriguez, Edy & Anna's second son
- Vanessa Ferlito as Roxanna Rodriguez, Edy & Anna's daughter
- Melonie Diaz as Marissa, Roxanna's best friend
- Luis Guzmán as Johnny, Jesse's cousin
- Jay Hernandez as Ozzy, Jesse's friend
- Alexander Bautista as Hector, Marissa's son
- Ramses Jimenez as Fernando, Marissa's boyfriend
- Manny Pérez as Alexis
- Jessica Camacho as Blonde

== Reception ==
=== Critical response ===
As of October 2021, review aggregation website Rotten Tomatoes gives the film a score of 54% based on reviews from 99 critics, with an average rating of 5.7/10. The site's consensus states: "The performances are the strength of Nothing Like the Holidays, a rather ordinary holiday comedy with a latin twist." Metacritic, which uses a weighted average, assigned the film a score of 50 out of 100, based on 24 critics, indicating "mixed or average" reviews.

=== Box office ===
The film opened at #7 at the North American box office making $3,531,664 USD in its opening weekend.

=== Awards ===
- Satellite Awards 2008:
  - Nomination: Satellite Award for Best Actress – Motion Picture Musical or Comedy (Debra Messing)

== Soundtrack ==
The film score was created by deejay/producer Paul Oakenfold and co-written and arranged with composer Michael J McEvoy.

== See also ==
- List of Christmas films
