= Wishful Thinking (1997 film) =

- Directed by: Adam Park
- Written by: Adam Park
- Produced by: Stuart Burkin
- Starring: Drew Barrymore; Jennifer Beals; James LeGros; Jon Stewart
- Cinematography: Ellery Ryan
- Edited by: Sue Blainey
- Music by: Paul Rabjohns
- Distributed by: Miramax
- Release date: July 9, 1997
- Running time: 91 minutes
- Country: United States
- Language: English

Wishful Thinking is a 1997 romantic comedy film directed by Adam Park, and starring Drew Barrymore, Jennifer Beals, James LeGros and Jon Stewart.

== Plot ==
Veterinarian Elizabeth questions the relationship, after her projectionist boyfriend Max declines the marriage. Max's beautiful co-worker, Lena who is in love with him, takes advantage of his romantic troubles and wants to have him for herself, playing on his fear that Elizabeth is having an affair with her friend Jack. Depressed by Max's increasing jealousy, Elizabeth considers breaking up with him after she meets Henry.

== Cast ==
- Jennifer Beals as Elizabeth
- James LeGros as Max
- Drew Barrymore as Lena
- Eric Thal as Jack
- Jon Stewart as Henry
- Desiree Casado as Donita

== Production ==
Wishful Thinking was an in-house project of Miramax, with no outside companies involved in the production. Writer/director Adam Park has not helmed any films since.

== Release and home media ==
The film was copyrighted in 1997 and first screened that year. It was released on VHS in the U.S. on December 7, 1999 by Buena Vista Home Video, the home video distribution arm of Miramax owner The Walt Disney Company. The Region 1 U.S. DVD followed on July 11, 2000. In Australia, it was released on VHS on January 9, 2001, through Village Roadshow (who had an Australian distribution agreement with Miramax at the time). The film subsequently received an Australian Region 4 DVD release a few years later. A subtitled Region 2 Swedish DVD was also released at an undetermined date.

In 2010, Miramax was sold by The Walt Disney Company (their owners since 1993), with the studio being taken over by private equity firm Filmyard Holdings that same year. Filmyard sublicensed the home video rights for several Miramax titles to Echo Bridge Entertainment. On April 19, 2011, Echo Bridge bundled it together on a DVD set with three other Miramax romantic comedies (2003's My Boss's Daughter and 2000's Down to You and About Adam). Miramax was then taken over by Qatari company beIN Media Group during March 2016. In April 2020, ViacomCBS (now known as Paramount Skydance) acquired the rights to Miramax's library, after buying a 49% stake in the studio from beIN. Wishful Thinking was one of the 700 titles Paramount acquired in the deal, and Paramount Pictures has distributed the film on digital platforms since April 2020. Paramount Home Entertainment reissued the film on DVD on August 10, 2021, with this being one of many Miramax titles that they reissued around this time.

== Reception ==
In 2023, Business Insider ranked it as the worst Drew Barrymore film, based on its Rotten Tomatoes rating.
