= Bright Days Ahead =

2013 film

- Film poster
- Directed by: Marion Vernoux
- Written by: Fanny Chesnel; Marion Vernoux
- Starring: Fanny Ardant; Laurent Lafitte; Patrick Chesnais; Jean-François Stévenin; Fanny Cottençon; Catherine Lachens; Alain Cauchi; Marie Rivière; Marc Chapiteau
- Cinematography: Nicolas Gaurin
- Edited by: Benoît Quinon
- Music by: Quentin Sirjacq
- Release date: 19 June 2013
- Running time: 93 minutes
- Country: France
- Language: French
- Budget: $3.3 million
- Box office: $4.2 million

Bright Days Ahead (French: Les Beaux Jours) is a 2013 French romance film directed by Marion Vernoux. It was screened in the Gala Presentation section at the 2013 Toronto International Film Festival. In January 2014, Fanny Ardant received a nomination for Best Actress at the 39th César Awards. Based on a novel by Fanny Chesnel, it tells the story of a married woman who retires at age 60 and joins a computer class, where she starts an affair with the much younger instructor.

== Plot ==
In a port on the north-west coast of France, Caroline retires from her husband's dental practice at age 60. Her married daughters give her a trial subscription to “Les Beaux Jours”, a club for retired people, where she joins the computer class. She and Julien, the instructor who is in his thirties, feel a mutual attraction and start an affair of snatched encounters. Her behaviour becomes increasingly reckless: wearing heavy make-up, taking up smoking, drinking lots of wine, endlessly receiving and sending texts, ignoring family friends, disappearing at odd hours, and coming home with clothes awry. Her husband warns her that he and others can't help noticing. Nevertheless, she books a short holiday in Iceland for her and Julien. At the airport, as Julien is chatting to a young Englishwoman on their flight, Caroline realises that she must release him to his sort of world and return to hers. She rings her husband to fetch her home.

== Cast ==
- Fanny Ardant as Caroline
- Laurent Lafitte as Julien
- Patrick Chesnais as Philippe
- Jean-François Stévenin as Roger
- Fanny Cottençon as Chantal
- Marie Rivière as Jocelyne aka Jojo
- Marc Chapiteau as Hugues
- Féodor Atkine as Paul
- Olivia Côte as Lydia
- Catherine Lachens as Sylviane
- Alain Cauchi as Jacky
- Émilie Caen as The hostess
