= Guns (1980 film) =

- Directed by: Robert Kramer
- Screenplay by: Robert Kramer
- Starring: Patrick Bauchau; Juliet Berto
- Cinematography: Louis Bihi; Richard Copans; Claude Michaud; Éric Pittard
- Edited by: Yann Dedet; Valeria Sarmiento
- Music by: Barre Phillips
- Release date: 1980
- Country: France
- Language: French

Guns is a 1980 French crime drama film written and directed by Robert Kramer. It premiered at the 37th Venice International Film Festival.

== Cast ==
- Patrick Bauchau as Tony
- Juliet Berto as Margot
- Peggy Frankston as Lil
- Hermine Karagheuz as Katrin
- Béatrice Lord as Marie
- Robert Kramer as Robin

== Production ==
The film was produced by Quasar. It marked the first French production for Kramer after he had relocated to Paris.

== Release ==
The film premiered at the 37th edition of the Venice Film Festival, in the Officina Veneziana sidebar.

== Reception ==
A contemporary Variety review described the film as "one of the most intensive, revelatory films about youthful revolt in the late '60s and early '70s in the U.S.A. in response to new political consciousness and changes wrought by the unpopular Vietnam war." Italian critic Paolo Mereghetti also praised the film, describing it as "among the finest examples of stylistic experimentation seen in recent years", and noting its visual references to Fernand Léger and Piet Mondrian.
