= Two Lions in the Sun =

1980 comedy-drama film

- Directed by: Claude Faraldo
- Screenplay by: Claude Faraldo
- Starring: Jean-François Stévenin
- Cinematography: Bernard Lutic
- Edited by: Dominique Galliéni
- Music by: Albert Marcœur; François Ovide
- Release date: 1980
- Language: French

Two Lions in the Sun (French: Deux Lions au soleil) is a 1980 French comedy-drama film written and directed by Claude Faraldo. It was entered into the main competition at the 37th Venice International Film Festival.

== Cast ==
- Jean-François Stévenin as Paul
- Jean-Pierre Sentier as René
- Catherine Lachens as Babette
- Jean-Pierre Tailhade as Volviste
- Martine Sarcey as the woman in the park
- Michel Robin as the man in the park
- Valérie Kling as Mireille
- Alain Doutey as the bank manager
- Jeanne Herviale as the landlady

== Release ==
The film entered the main competition at the 37th edition of the Venice Film Festival, in the Officina Veneziana sidebar.

== Reception ==
A contemporary Variety review described the film as a "sometimes strained, sometimes touching tale" that has "intensity of mood" and an "offbeat treatment and subject". Stefano Reggiani from La Stampa also praised the film, "a finely crafted story, full of subtlety, a parable marked by the urgency of reality."
