= Gangsters (1992 film) =

1992 film

- Film poster
- Directed by: Massimo Guglielmi
- Written by: Claudio Lizza; Federico Pacifici
- Produced by: Gianni Minervini
- Starring: Ennio Fantastichini; Giuseppe Cederna; Isabella Ferrari; Giulio Scarpati; Luca Lionello; Ivano Marescotti; Maria Monti; Mattia Sbragia; Claudio Bigagli
- Cinematography: Paolo Rossato
- Edited by: Nino Baragli
- Music by: Armando Trovajoli
- Release date: 17 September 1992
- Running time: 90 minutes
- Country: Italy
- Language: Italian

Gangsters is a 1992 Italian drama film directed by Massimo Guglielmi. It was entered into the 18th Moscow International Film Festival.

== Plot ==
Genoa, 1945, after the end of the Second World War Umberto, Giulio and Enrico, three partisans, intend to continue their struggle killing the fascists, responsible for the murders and the tortures against the anti-fascists, who were not captured or they went unpunished. Their actions, however, do not have an exclusive punitive or vengeance aim, hoping that the fight will continue throughout the country, up to the revolution.

The Italian Communist Party, however, distances itself from these actions and, having learned of the identity of the three, sends the official Bava, acquaintance of the three and a friend of Giulio, to warn him to stop but the attempt will not succeed.

== Cast ==
- Ennio Fantastichini as Giulio
- Isabella Ferrari as Evelina
- Giuseppe Cederna as Umberto
- Giulio Scarpati as Enrico
- Luca Lionello as Franco
- Claudio Bigagli as Nicola
- Mattia Sbragia as the Carabinieri lieutenant
- Ivano Marescotti as Bava
- Maria Monti as the guest-house owner
