= Alison Swan =

British–American filmmaker from Bermuda

Alison Swan, is a British–American filmmaker, writer, actor, campaign manager and real estate developer from Bermuda Swan is a native of Bermuda, and is known for her films Mixing Nia (1998) and Nothing like the Holidays (2008). She co-wrote Nothing like the Holiday with her husband and American film producer Robert Teitel. She is a mother of two boys and was pregnant with her second son while writing the screen play for Nothing like the Holidays, which she eventually sold to Overture Films. Her work gives insight into the lives of African and Latin American families and the social and ideological differences that distinguish them from traditional American norms.

== Early life and education ==
Similarly to many other children born in Bermuda who came from money, Swan attend an off-island boarding school on the east coast in her teens. She graduated from Bates College in 1988 with a BA in European Art and Politics, in 1994 she attended the New York University where she received an MFA in Filmmaking, and then in 2015 she received a masters in real estate development from the University of Southern California.

While attending NYU Swan was awarded the Spike Lee fellowship for her work in four narrative shorts. Following her graduation she attempted to obtain funding for what would have been her first feature-length film, but after the financing fell through she began working for producer Robert Stigwood. Following her failed attempt to receive funding for her first feature-length film she returned to Bermuda to make a documentary short. Being the daughter of John Swan the former Premier of Bermuda, She had a background in politics and while living in Bermuda she assisted in managing media for several political campaigns.

== Career ==
Alison Swan's film career began with a short film entitled Compeñera (1993) which she directed. She then wrote and directed her first feature-length film Mixing Nia (1998). She then made her first and last acting debut in the television series Always And Everyone (1999) following this she was featured in a documentary titled Sisters In Cinema (2003), and lastly she wrote the screenplay for her holiday film Nothing like the Holidays (2008). She no longer works in the film industry but is focused on her career as a real estate developer for a family run real estate company Challenger Bank Ltd.

== Filmography ==
Release year	Film title	Contributed Role(s)
1993	Compeñera	Director
1998	Mixing Nia	Writer/Director
1999	Always and Everyone	Actress
2003	Sisters In Cinema	Actress
2008	Nothing like the Holidays	Writer

== Awards ==
NYU Spike Lee Fellowship
