= The Girl from Millelire Street =

- Directed by: Gianni Serra
- Screenplay by: Gianni Serra; Tomaso Sherman; Tiziana Aristarco
- Starring: Oria Conforti; Maria Monti
- Cinematography: Dario Di Palma
- Edited by: Maria Di Mauro
- Music by: Luis Bacalov
- Release date: 1980
- Country: Italy
- Language: Italian

The Girl from Millelire Street (Italian: La ragazza di via Millelire) is a 1980 Italian drama film co-written and directed by Gianni Serra. It premiered at the 37th Venice International Film Festival.

== Cast ==
- Oria Conforti as Betty
- Maria Monti as Verdiana
- Silvana Lombardo as Wanda
- Diego Dettori as Petrini
- Lisa Policaro as Luisa
- Danilo De Girolamo as Mastino

== Production ==
The principal cinematography started in Turin in June 1979. The lead actress, 15-year-old Oria Conforti, was selected from more than 300 young girls who auditioned for the role. It had a budget of just under 200 million lire.

== Release ==
The film premiered at the 37th edition of the Venice Film Festival, in the Officina Veneziana sidebar.

== Reception ==
A contemporary Variety review described the film as "somewhat disparate and rambling" but able to "give a disturbing yet humanly observed look at fringe subproletarian life in a big industrial city". Roberto Puppi called it "one of the most important films in Italian cinema of the decade", describing it as "a ruthless look at youth marginalization in a major metropolis and a scathing indictment of the devastation caused by drugs".
