= Themroc =

- French film poster for Themroc
- Directed by: Claude Faraldo
- Written by: Claude Faraldo
- Produced by: François de Lannurien; Helène Vager
- Starring: Michel Piccoli; Béatrice Romand
- Cinematography: Jean-Marc Ripert
- Edited by: Noun Serra
- Music by: Harald Maury
- Distributed by: Cinema International Corporation
- Release date: 1973
- Running time: 106 min.
- Country: France
- Language: Gibberish

Themroc is a 1973 French satirical film by director Claude Faraldo. It was produced by François de Lannurien and Helène Vager and its original music was composed by Harald Maury. Made on a low budget with no intelligible dialogue, Themroc tells the story of a French blue collar worker who rebels against modern society, reverting to an urban caveman. The film's scenes of incest and cannibalism earned it adults-only ratings. It was the first film to be shown in the UK's Channel 4's red triangle series of controversial films in 1986. It has become a cult film.

== Main cast ==
- Michel Piccoli as Themroc
- Béatrice Romand as Sister of Themroc
- Marilù Tolo as Superior shapely secretary
- Francesca Romana Coluzzi as Female neighbor
- Jeanne Herviale as Mother
- Patrick Dewaere as A police officer
- Coluche as Male neighbor
- Miou-Miou as the young neighbor
