= Boomtown (2002 TV series) =

American television drama series that aired on NBC in 2002-2003

- Genre: Action; Drama; Police procedural
- Created by: Graham Yost
- Starring: Donnie Wahlberg; Neal McDonough; Mykelti Williamson; Gary Basaraba; Jason Gedrick; Nina Garbiras; Lana Parrilla
- Composer: Philip Giffin
- Country of origin: United States
- Original language: English
- No. of seasons: 2
- No. of episodes: 24

Production
- Executive producers: Jon Avnet; Graham Yost
- Producers: Fred Golan; Stephen Sassen; Javier Grillo-Marxuach
- Camera setup: Single-camera
- Running time: 45 minutes
- Production companies: Nemo Films; DreamWorks Television; NBC Studios

Original release
- Network: NBC
- Release: September 29, 2002 – December 28, 2003

Boomtown is an American action drama television series created by Graham Yost, that aired on NBC from September 29, 2002 to December 28, 2003. The show's title is a nickname for its setting: Los Angeles, California.

== Overview ==
The show portrayed a criminal investigation each week, seen from various points of view: the police officers and detectives, the lawyers, paramedics, reporters, victims, witnesses, and criminals.

The series premiered on September 29, 2002. The first season order was for 18 episodes. After disappointing ratings, the series was retooled: the reliance on non-linear storytelling was lessened, some characters were written out, and others were introduced. Ratings did not improve, and the series was canceled, with the last episode airing on December 28, 2003.

Despite its low viewership, Boomtown received several awards and nominations, including Emmy Awards, Golden Satellite Awards, and Television Critics Association Awards.

== Cast and characters ==
Boomtown season 2 promotional image

=== Main ===
- Donnie Wahlberg as Los Angeles Police Department Detective II Joel Stevens
- Neal McDonough as Los Angeles County Assistant District Attorney David McNorris
- Mykelti Williamson as Los Angeles Police Department Detective II Bobby 'Fearless' Smith
- Gary Basaraba as Los Angeles Police Department Police Officer III Ray Hechler
- Nina Garbiras as Andrea Little, a reporter (season one)
- Lana Parrilla as Teresa Ortiz, a paramedic in season one, and a rookie police officer in season two
- Jason Gedrick as Los Angeles Police Department Police Officer II Tom Turcotte

=== Recurring ===
- Megan Ward as Kelly Stevens
- David Proval as Los Angeles Police Department Detective II Paul Turcotte
- Dorian Harewood as Los Angeles Police Department Captain Ron Hicks
- Kelly Rowan as Marian McNorris (season one)
- Erich Anderson as Ben Fisher (season one)
- Kim Murphy as Susan (season one)
- Matt Craven as Dr. Michael Hirsch (season one)
- Rick Gomez as Detective Daniel Ramos (season one)
- Kelly Hu as Rachel Durrel (season two)
- Vanessa L. Williams as Los Angeles Police Department Detective III Katherine Pierce (season two)

== Episodes ==
=== Series overview ===
Season	Episodes	Originally released	
Season	Episodes	First released	Last released
1	18	September 29, 2002	April 20, 2003
2	6	September 26, 2003	December 28, 2003

=== Season 1 (2002–03) ===
No. overall	No. in season	Title	Directed by	Written by	Original release date	Prod. code	U.S. viewers (millions)
1	1	"Pilot"	Jon Avnet	Graham Yost	September 29, 2002	2101	13.45
A drive-by shooting is investigated from several angles. We meet Fearless, detective and Gulf War veteran with a list of things to do before he dies, and a habit of telling stories; Joel, a detective who is still attempting to hide the suicide attempt of his wife Kelly; Teresa, the kind-hearted paramedic who was on duty the night of said attempt; David McNorris, the manipulative deputy district attorney; reporter Andrea Little, his secret mistress; Ray Hechler, a cop under suspicion of corruption; and his young partner Tom, a mediocre officer who is frequently criticized by his father.
2	2	"Possession"	Jon Avnet	Graham Yost	October 6, 2002	1002	11.03
After a telemarketer overhears a murder plot on the phone, Joel, Fearless, Ray and Tom scramble to find him; while David and Andrea find the pressure of their affair building.
3	3	"The Squeeze"	Jon Avnet	Michelle Ashford	October 13, 2002	1003	10.43
A prominent attorney gets murder charges against him dropped, and everyone takes different paths in an attempt to get him to confess.
4	4	"Reelin' in the Years"	Bobby Roth	Laurence Andries	October 20, 2002	1004	10.55
After Joel and Fearless solve the murder of Tom's father's former partner, Tom and Andrea face their past.
5	5	"All Hallow's Eve"	Frederick King Keller	Graham Yost	October 27, 2002	1005	8.65
On Halloween, David is stunned when Andrea breaks up with him on the same night that Marian accuses him of adultery; Ray and Tom go undercover to stop pumpkins thieves; while Joel and Fearless try to save Teresa - whose ambulance has been hijacked.
6	6	"The Freak"	Jon Avnet	Michelle Ashford	November 3, 2002	1006	10.08
Ray and Tom investigate a bizarre case while Fearless risks his life to save a little girl, because of a haunting memory of an old war buddy.
7	7	"Insured by Smith & Wesson"	Peter Werner	Story by : Chris Brancato & Albert J. Salke; Teleplay by : Chris Brancato	November 10, 2002	1008	10.51
When Ray goes undercover into a hostage situation inside a sporting goods store, he discovers that the store manager is a former actor of Ray's favorite 1980s TV show. While attempting to convince the manager to help him save the day, Ray's illusions are shattered.
8	8	"Crash"	Jeremy Kagan	Fred Golan	November 17, 2002	1009	10.62
Fearless's ex-girlfriend joins him and Joel on a case to crack an insurance fraud ring.
9	9	"The David McNorris Show"	Peter Werner	Laurie D. Arent	December 1, 2002	1010	9.19
While Joel and Fearless investigate the death of a teenage girl, McNorris makes some dirty deals which collapse just as his marriage does.
10	10	"Coyote"	Alex Zakrzewski	Ronald A. Burla	December 8, 2002	1007	9.78
Joel and Fearless must convince Andrea to face a psychotic homeless man who she went to school with to find a kidnapped teenager.
11	11	"Monster's Brawl"	Rodrigo García	Javier Grillo-Marxuach	January 5, 2003	1011	10.54
On a tip from Teresa, Joel, Fearless, Tom and a slowly falling apart David team up to convict a group of filmmakers inspiring homeless people to kill each other. Guest star: Neil Patrick Harris as Peter Corman.
12	12	"Sinaloa Cowboys"	Michael W. Watkins	Graham Yost	January 12, 2003	1012	11.44
A simple domestic disturbance call becomes a life-changing event for Ray and Tom as they find themselves in the middle of a drug war, while Joel and Teresa grow closer.
13	13	"Home Invasion"	Tucker Gates	Joel Anderson Thompson	March 2, 2003	1013	10.99
Joel and Fearless must reluctantly let Andrea in on their case when they discover a group of killers who stake out a family home before torturing and killing the family.
14	14	"Execution"	Jon Avnet	Laurence Andries	March 9, 2003	1014	10.27
On the night of his execution, a criminal gives McNorris an ultimatum: save his life or risk the death of a kidnapped cop. While McNorris attempts to save him, Ray and his fellow officers attempt to take a more pragmatic course, unaware of what they are up against.
15	15	"Storm Watch"	Jon Avnet	Story by : Chris Brancato & Kevin Dunigan; Teleplay by : Chris Brancato	March 16, 2003	1015	10.64
Ray, Joel, Tom and Fearless are locked down in the station along with their fellow cops when a mole is suspected and Ray has no choice but to ask Andrea - who almost cost him his badge a year earlier - to help; meanwhile McNorris continues on a downward spiral.
16	16	"Fearless"	Frederick King Keller	Story by : Graham Yost & Mykelti Williamson; Teleplay by : Graham Yost	March 30, 2003	1016	9.72
In a rather different episode (featuring only one point of view, Fearless's), Fearless investigates the shooting of a drug dealer, and faces his past.
17	17	"Blackout"	Jack Bender	Fred Golan	April 13, 2003	1017	8.74
With his wife having left him, and Andrea refusing to take him back, McNorris finds himself drinking into blackouts, which ultimately leads him to wake up with blood on his car. When he learns about a hit-and-run incident, he begins to act fearfully, and his suspicions tip off Joel, who is working with Fearless, Ray and Tom to crack the case.
18	18	"Lost Child"	Frederick King Keller	Michelle Ashford	April 20, 2003	1018	11.35
Already agonizing over his feelings for Teresa, Joel is put on the case of a kidnapped newborn. While Fearless, Andrea, Ray and David (preparing for rehab) investigate, Joel finds himself finally confronting his wife's suicide attempt and the death of their newborn daughter; while Tom finds himself being coerced into snitching on Joel.

=== Season 2 (2003) ===
No. overall	No. in season	Title	Directed by	Written by	Original release date	Prod. code	U.S. viewers (millions)
19	1	"The Love of Money"	Jon Avnet	Graham Yost	September 26, 2003	2001	7.77
Joel, Fearless, Ray and Tom work together to investigate a group of cop killers, who threaten Joel's family. Joel has Robbery/Homicide detective Katherine Pierce reassigned to their division to assist. Meanwhile, David recovers in rehab and Teresa considers her future. Guest star: Rebecca De Mornay as Sabrina Fithian.
20	2	"Inadmissible"	Jon Avnet	Anne McGrail	October 3, 2003	2002	6.65
Ray and Katherine testify against the cop killers; David comes out of rehab and gets straight onto the case despite his recent alcoholism; and Teresa joins the police academy. Guest stars: Rebecca De Mornay as Sabrina Fithian, Stacy Keach as Mac McNorris, and Roma Maffia as Sally Jacobson.
21	3	"Wannabe"	Jon Avnet	Fred Golan	December 27, 2003	2003	4.49
Joel and Fearless investigate when Teresa discovers a body at the police academy; Ray, Tom and Katherine work to stop a gang of thieves who pose as police officers.
22	4	"Haystack"	Frederick King Keller	Clyde Phillips	December 27, 2003	2004	5.28
A gang of fleeing bank robbers take a group of hostages at a shopping center, including Teresa.
23	5	"The Hole-in-the-Wall Gang"	Kevin Hooks	Laurence Andries	December 27, 2003	2005	5.77
A frat boy killed and buried in the wall of a frat house twenty years ago is found, and David, Katherine, Joel and Fearless investigate. Guest star: LeVar Burton as Marvin Lloyd.
24	6	"The Big Picture"	Frederick King Keller	Laurie D. Arent	December 28, 2003	2006	8.89
Not following his instincts on a domestic disturbance call, Tom is horrified when the woman goes missing and the chief suspect is murdered; so he works with Katherine in a desperate effort to find the truth. Guest star: Virginia Madsen as Erika Ashland.

== Reception ==
=== Critical response ===
Boomtown received largely positive reviews from critics. On Rotten Tomatoes, the first season has an approval rating of 96% with an average score of 10/10 based on 26 reviews. The website's critical consensus is, "Boomtown gives the police procedural innovative pep with its dense ensemble and warring perspectives, bringing a refreshing moral ambiguity to primetime." On Metacritic, the first season has a score of 89 out of 100 based on 31 reviews, signifying "universal acclaim".

==== Retrospective ====
In retrospect, series creator Graham Yost suggested that Boomtown may have been better suited to a cable network, stating, "Boomtown was perhaps, in retrospect, better suited for HBO or FX." However, he noted that HBO was already airing The Wire, while FX had The Shield, leaving NBC as the most viable home for the series. According to Yost, NBC initially embraced the show’s Rashomon-style narrative structure, but its disappointing ratings eventually led the network to question its unconventional approach: "When the ratings weren't spectacular, what happens is everyone questions everything. 'Maybe that's the problem. Maybe it's the music. Maybe it's this. Maybe it's that.' And the doubt becomes corrosive."

Yost also recalled that while the producers were campaigning for a second season, NBC discouraged them from producing further episodes similar to one in which Fearless, portrayed by Mykelti Williamson, confronts his childhood sexual abuse. Although Yost remained uncertain whether compromising the show’s original approach was the right decision, he described the episode as "one of the best episodes we ever did", adding, "I'm extraordinarily proud of that." Reflecting on the show’s abbreviated second season, Yost acknowledged having mixed feelings about the compromises made in an effort to keep the series alive.

Donnie Wahlberg, who portrayed Detective Joel Stevens, also spoke fondly of his experience on the series: "I had a great time. I loved going to work every day. I loved my character, I loved the show. I loved the people I worked with." Discussing its cancellation, Wahlberg acknowledged the pressures surrounding a network television series, citing the different expectations of audiences, the network and sponsors. He concluded that if the series could not meet those expectations, "then the show stops."

=== Awards and nominations ===
Awards and nominations for Boomtown
Year	Award	Category	Recipient	Result
2003	American Film Institute Award	TV Program of the Year		Won
2003	Casting Society of America's Artios Award	Best Casting for TV, Dramatic Pilot	Meg Liberman and Camille H. Patton	Nominated
2003	Imagen Foundation Award	Best Supporting Actress - Television	Lana Parrilla	Won
2003	NAACP Image Award	Outstanding Actor in a Drama Series	Mykelti Williamson	Nominated
2003	Online Film & Television Association Award	Best Supporting Actor in a Drama Series	Neal McDonough	Nominated
2003	Online Film & Television Association Award	Best Direction in a Drama Series	Jon Avnet (For the pilot episode)	Nominated
2003	Peabody Award		NBC Studios, in association with DreamWorks Television Inc., and Nemo Films	Won
2003	Primetime Emmy Award	Outstanding Main Title Theme Music	Philip Giffin	Nominated
2003	Television Critics Association Award	Program of the Year		Nominated
2003	Television Critics Association Award	Outstanding Achievement in Drama		Won
2003	Television Critics Association Award	Outstanding New Program		Won
2003	Television Critics Association Award	Individual Achievement in Drama	Neal McDonough	Nominated
2004	Satellite Award	Best Television Series – Drama		Nominated
2004	Satellite Award	Best Supporting Actor – Television Series – Drama	Neal McDonough	Won

== Home media ==
Lionsgate Home Entertainment has released the first season of Boomtown on DVD in Region 1 on July 20, 2004. Season 1 was subsequently released in Region 2 as well. Despite strong sales of season 1 and popular demand on TV-DVD websites, season 2 was never released in the USA or UK. The season 2 episodes were made available on the french DVD box set Boomtown Complet, which also includes a short interview with French film critic Alain Carraze, who offers comments about the show. The DVD's released in the United States contain an optional commentary soundtrack by individuals who were involved in making the show but this is absent from the French and British DVD releases.

The Region 1 release has been discontinued and is now out of print.

In February 2006, Viacom (now known as Paramount Skydance) purchased the live-action film and television assets of DreamWorks for $1.6 billion. This granted it partial ownership of Boomtown, as the show's underlying rights were originally split between NBC Studios and DreamWorks Television. As of 2025, this show isn't available for streaming on NBCUniversal's streaming service Peacock, or Paramount's streaming services Pluto TV and Paramount+, but it was available on Amazon Prime Video before being removed in January 2021. NBCUniversal and Paramount have yet to release a complete series of the show on home video.

International distribution rights for the series are currently held by MGM.
