= Masoch (film) =

- Directed by: Franco Brogi Taviani
- Screenplay by: Franco Brogi Taviani
- Starring: Paolo Malco; Francesca De Sapio; Fabrizio Bentivoglio
- Cinematography: Angelo Bevilacqua
- Edited by: Sergio Buzi
- Music by: Gianfranco Plenizio
- Release date: 1980
- Countries: Italy; France
- Language: Italian

Masoch is a 1980 Italian biographical drama film written and directed by Franco Brogi Taviani, in his feature film debut. It premiered at the 37th Venice International Film Festival.

== Cast ==
- Paolo Malco as Leopold von Sacher-Masoch
- Francesca De Sapio as Aurora Rümelin / Wanda
- Fabrizio Bentivoglio as Alexander
- Inga Alexandrova as Irina
- Dario Mazzoli as Staudenheim
- Remo Remotti as Grunwald
- Valeria D'Obici as Hulda
- Stefano Calanchi as El Greco
- Franca Lumachi as Zurbisseger
- Claudio Sorrentino as Armand

== Production ==
The film marked the feature film debut of Franco Brogi Taviani, the younger brother of Paolo and Vittorio Taviani. Based on Aurora von Rümelin's 1906 memoirs Meine Lebensbeichte, it depicts real-life events of Leopold von Sacher-Masoch. Principal photography started in September 1979. The film was produced by Difilm S.r.l.-Tierre SAS.

== Release ==
The film premiered at the 37th edition of the Venice Film Festival, in the Officina Veneziana sidebar. It was later screened out of competititon at the Montreal International Film Festival.

== Reception ==
A contemporary Variety review described the film as "handsome and riveting", "a first-rate accomplishment, a stylistic triumph for Taviani". La Stampa's film critic Stefano Reggiani called it "a fine example of style, of calculation, of passionate detachment, but also of domination over the viewer", noting that "once it appears to ‘explain’ masochism in order to free the audience towards an objective judgement, it has already destroyed its subject, already neutralized the monster with the [...] ridicule, already imposed a thesis that turns a sexual phenomenon into a political metaphor".
