= French Cuisine (film) =

- Film poster
- Directed by: Florent Siri
- Screenplay by: Cécile Sellam; Mathieu Oullion; Matt Alexander
- Based on: La Cuisine au beurre by Gilles Grangier
- Produced by: Cyril Colbeau-Justin; Jean-Baptiste Dupont
- Starring: Franck Dubosc; Gérard Lanvin
- Cinematography: Giovanni Fiore Coltellacci
- Edited by: Olivier Gajan
- Music by: Emmanuel d'Orlando
- Production companies: LGM Cinéma; StudioCanal; TF1 Films Production; Cinéfrance Plus; Emilio Films
- Distributed by: StudioCanal
- Release date: 30 December 2015
- Running time: 80 minutes
- Country: France
- Language: French
- Box office: $1.7 million

French Cuisine (original title: Pension complète) is a 2015 French comedy film directed by Florent Siri and starring Franck Dubosc and Gérard Lanvin. It is a remake of the 1963 French-Italian film La Cuisine au beurre, which was directed by Gilles Grangier.

== Cast ==
- Franck Dubosc as François
- Gérard Lanvin as Alex
- Pascale Arbillot as Charlotte
- Audrey Dana as Pascale
- Catherine Lachens as Maman François
- Nader Boussandel as Mamed
- Marc Barbé as Franck
- Nora Hamzawi as Victoire Bonnaire
- Abdoulaye Dembele as Brice
