= Bernard Lutic =

French cinematographer

- Born: 26 November 1943; Paimpol, France
- Died: 28 November 2000 (aged 57); Venezuela
- Occupation: Cinematographer

Bernard Lutic (26 November 1943 – 28 November 2000) was a French cinematographer. Lutic died in a plane crash in Venezuela.

== Selected filmography ==
Film
Year	Title	Notes
2001	Winged Migration	with 14 others Boston Society of Film Critics Award for Best Cinematography; Nominee - Chicago Film Critics Association Award for Best Cinematography; Nominee - Online Film Critics Society Award for Best Cinematography
2000	Lumumba	
2000	The Luzhin Defence	
2000	I Dreamed of Africa	
1999	My Life So Far	
1998	Hanuman	
1994	Colonel Chabert	Nominee - César Award for Best Cinematography
1992	Toutes peines confondues	
1992	Dien Bien Phu	
1991	A Day to Remember	
1989	The Return of the Musketeers	
1987	Boyfriends and Girlfriends	
1985	Revolution	
1983	Entre Nous	
1982	Le Beau Mariage	
1981	The Aviator's Wife	
1980	Le bar du téléphone	
1980	Two Lions in the Sun	
