= Gianni Serra =

Italian film director (1933–2020)

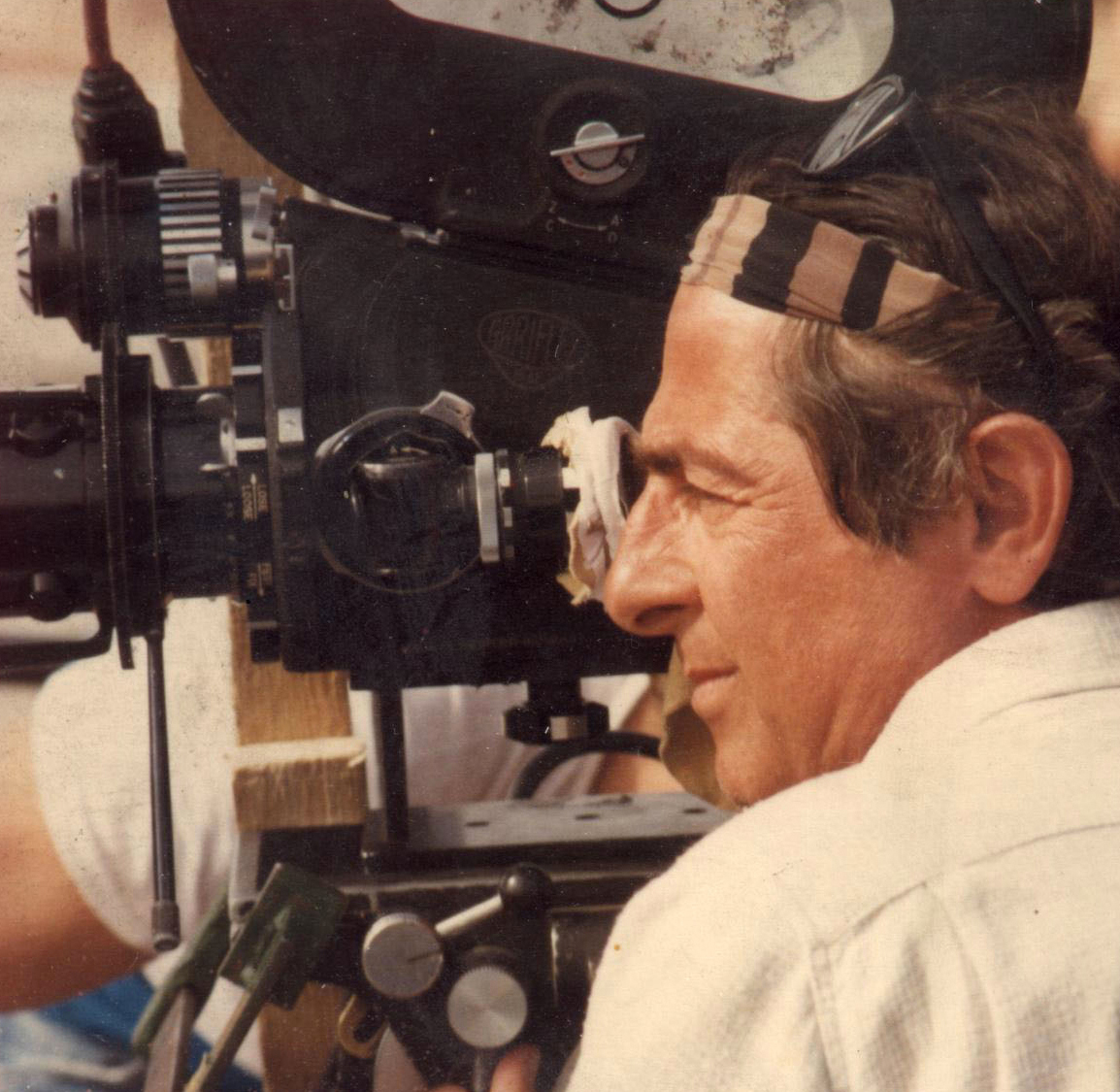
- Born: 14 December 1933; Montichiari, Italy
- Died: 3 September 2020 (aged 86); Rome, Italy
- Occupations: Film director, screenwriter

Gianni Serra (14 December 1933 – 3 September 2020) was an Italian film director and screenwriter.

Born in Montichiari, Serra started his career as a radio writer and an investigative journalist. He is best known for a series of controversial socially committed drama films, including Uno dei tre, about the lives of Greek political exiles in Italy, and The Girl from Millelire Street, a crude portrayal of marginalization and drug use in Turin, which was screened at the 37th Venice International Film Festival.
