= Oxalá (film) =

- Directed by: António-Pedro Vasconcelos
- Screenplay by: António-Pedro Vasconcelos
- Produced by: Paulo Branco; José Luís Vasconcelos
- Starring: Manuel Baeta Neves
- Cinematography: João Rocha
- Edited by: Leonor Guterres
- Release date: 1980
- Country: Portugal
- Language: Portuguese

Oxalá is a 1980 Portuguese drama film written and directed by António-Pedro Vasconcelos. It premiered at the 37th Venice International Film Festival.

== Cast ==
- Manuel Baeta Neves as José Caeiro
- Marta Reynolds as Maria
- Laura Soveral as Inês
- Judith Magre as Françoise
- Ruy Furtado as Manuel
- Lia Gama as Lídia

== Production ==
The film was the first work produced by V.O. Filmes. The production, which lasted from 1977 to 1980, was very difficult, being plagued by funding problems, crew strikes, technical difficulties, and an eight-month halt in filming.

== Release ==
The film premiered at the 37th edition of the Venice Film Festival, in the Officina Veneziana sidebar. It was theatrically released in Portugal in 1981 in a slightly different version from the one screened at the festival.

== Reception ==
A contemporary Variety review noted the film as "may be a bit rambling but balances a tendency toward the French penchant for overabundant dialog with a more terse visual treatment." International Herald Tribune critic Thomas Quinn Curtiss lauded it, describing it as probably the most important revelation of the festival.
