= The Puppet Masters (film) =

1994 American science fiction horror film

- Theatrical release poster
- Directed by: Stuart Orme
- Screenplay by: Ted Elliott; Terry Rossio; David S. Goyer
- Based on: The Puppet Masters by Robert A. Heinlein
- Produced by: Ralph Winter
- Starring: Donald Sutherland; Eric Thal; Julie Warner; Yaphet Kotto
- Cinematography: Clive Tickner
- Edited by: William Goldenberg
- Music by: Colin Towns
- Production company: Hollywood Pictures
- Distributed by: Buena Vista Pictures Distribution
- Release date: October 21, 1994
- Running time: 109 minutes
- Country: United States
- Language: English
- Budget: $15 million
- Box office: $8.6 million

The Puppet Masters is a 1994 American science fiction horror film, adapted by Ted Elliott, Terry Rossio and David S. Goyer from Robert A. Heinlein's 1951 novel of the same title, in which a trio of American government agents attempts to thwart a covert invasion of Earth by mind-controlling alien parasites. The film was directed by Stuart Orme and stars Donald Sutherland, Eric Thal, Keith David, Julie Warner and Andrew Robinson. The Puppet Masters was released by Buena Vista Pictures Distribution on October 21, 1994. It was a critical and commercial failure, grossing $8.6 million against a $15 million budget.

== Plot ==
When a flying saucer reportedly lands in rural Iowa, Andrew Nivens (who runs a secret branch of the Central Intelligence Agency tasked with investigating extraterrestrial activity) sends two agents from their local office to investigate the crash site. After the two agents disappear shortly after their arrival, Andrew now goes in person, accompanied by agents Sam Nivens (his son) and Jarvis, as well as Dr. Mary Sefton, a NASA specialist.

At the crash site, now staged as a phony tourist attraction, they encounter people who appear to display no emotions. To test this theory when meeting with a local television station manager, Mary partially opens her blouse but gets no reaction from the manager who ignores her attempts to seduce him.

Suspecting that the man is not who he seems, Sam attempts to take him into custody; however, a brutal fight takes place in the man's office, killing the manager. The team then locates an alien that looks like a slug attached to the man's back. The team manages to capture the alien and, after a chase during which multiple infected town citizens attempt to stop them, they return to their plane.

The slugs soon spread steadily from the infected town and during a staff meeting where the team discusses the situation, Sam notices that Jarvis has stopped chain-smoking. Suspecting that he may have been infected, Sam and the team attempt to restrain Jarvis and, after a brief chase, they locate the unconscious Jarvis who no longer has an alien on his back. Andrew and the team conduct a search of their office building and after being unable to locate the alien, Andrew orders all of his staff (at gunpoint) including Sam to remove their shirts. At this time, Andrew's personal secretary refuses to remove her shirt and attempts to flee the building. Agents, including Sam, pursue her, and after a brutal one-on-one fight, Andrew and Alex Holland (Sam's best friend and leader of the agency SWAT team) locate Sam and the now-dead secretary in the office's kitchen. Sam tells his father that the alien had gotten away but unbeknownst to them, the alien had infected Sam. Shortly after Sam is infected, Jarvis kills himself after being unable to cope with the withdrawal from being infected and the removal of the alien.

The now-infected Sam goes to Jarvis's apartment and with the help of the unsuspecting apartment manager, Greenberg, opens crates of parasites that Jarvis had shipped to himself. Sam infects Greenberg (who removes his glasses) and then it's learned that the parasites communicate with each other by touching each other with tentacles. Along with communicating telepathically, the aliens have the ability to correct any ailment affecting the host (such as Jarvis's chain-smoking and Greenberg vision issues). Sam and Greenberg then go to a convention center where the president of the United States plans to conduct a meeting. They then infect the Agent in Charge of the President's Secret Service Detail. The President arrives and is saved from his now-infected security detail by a tactical team of uninfected agents working for Andrew and Holland. After a brief chase, Sam is captured by his father, but Greenberg leaves with all of the knowledge passed to him by all of the infected people (including Sam and the infected Secret Service agents). Back in the office, Andrew, Mary, Holland, and Dr. Graves (the lead medical researcher for the team) interrogate the infected Sam. They then learn that the aliens have complete control over their hosts, including killing them and bringing them back to life. Andrew threatens the alien by subjecting Sam to electric shocks, through which they then learn that electric shocks briefly break the alien's control, at the expense of injuring the host. The alien tells Andrew that it will kill Sam to prove its power and when it stops his heart, Mary conducts massive electrical shocks to Sam, causing the alien to leave his body after believing that Sam is no longer a viable host. The team is able to resuscitate Sam; however, he begins to suffer the same withdrawal that affected Jarvis. After suffering significant withdrawal, Mary comforts Sam and they begin a personal relationship.

Andrew recommends to the President that the US military be sent in to clear out the aliens, which have now infected the entire area, as well as members of local law enforcement and of the Iowa National Guard. The aliens are able to reproduce asexually by division and soon the army gets infected. At the same time, Sam and Mary are back at Sam's apartment discussing the events of the day and after Sam changes clothes after the events of the day, Mary attempts to seduce him. Sam then discovers that Mary had been infected by an alien that had infected Sam's cat to gain entry into his apartment. After informing Sam that the aliens now know everything that they know, and any attempts to harm the alien would harm Mary, Mary makes a seemingly impossible jump from Sam's third-floor apartment and flees in a car driven by Greenberg.

Back at the office, Sam, Alex, and Andrew watch as two chimpanzees that had been infected for research purposes infect another chimpanzee against its will. The third chimpanzee then types a message to Sam on a computer asking him if he remembers it, thus confirming that all of the aliens share the collective knowledge of the entire group. Sam and Alex theorize as to how the aliens are able to expand so quickly and realize that they are using a large river to move the hive. Sam and Alex then parachute into Des Moines, Iowa, which has now been fully infected. Once there Sam enters the hive using a transmitter that Graves created, that mimics the communication frequency used by the aliens. Once inside, Sam realizes that he still receives telepathic messages from the alien that had infected him which nearly causes him to allow himself to be infected again; however, he breaks free from the message and opens fire on infected citizens, who have discovered that he is not infected. Sam manages to find Mary and, after nearly killing her to remove the alien from her back, she informs him that they need to retrieve a child that had been kept in isolation from the infected townspeople. During this time, Alex entered the hive to help his partner escape. As Sam and Mary are retrieving the child, Alex comes under heavy fire from infected soldiers and townspeople, falling into the pool where the aliens reproduce. While Sam and Mary retreat to the extraction point with the child, the now-infected Alex confronts them after tracking his partner through each others' equipped location beacons. After a brutal fight, Alex manages to briefly break the mental hold the alien has over him through sheer will and tells Sam to leave him. Sam refuses to leave his friend and begs for him to fight the alien's control, but the alien retakes control of him and attempts to reinfect Sam, upon which Mary shoots and kills Alex. Sam, Mary, and the child make it to the extraction point where they are picked up and flown back to base.

Back at base, the team learns that the child once suffered from encephalitis, which was apparently the reason a slug couldn't possess him. The team tests the theory by infecting an alien with the encephalitis virus, which causes the alien to explode and die. Biological warfare is adopted and seemingly all parasites die, freeing their victims. During a later inspection of a hive, debris falls on Andrew, which allows a previously undiscovered last alien to infect him. Sam realizes that his father was infected upon seeing Andrew walk normally when he had previously needed to use a cane due to a leg injury. Sam pursues his infected father, who has now commandeered a helicopter. After a brutal fight on the helicopter, Sam shoots his father, causing the alien to leave the now-useless Andrew. The alien attempts to leave the helicopter, but is killed by the helicopter's tail rotor. Now back on the ground, Andrew confirms that that was the last alien and that he is aware of how much Sam loves him and how Sam and Mary feel about each other. While Andrew is treated for his injuries, Sam remarks to Mary that now she knows everything about him but he has to learn about her. Mary tells him that he has a lifetime to get to know her.

== Cast ==
- Donald Sutherland as Andrew Nivens
- Eric Thal as Sam Nivens
- Julie Warner as Mary Sefton
- Keith David as Alex Holland
- Will Patton as Dr. Graves
- Richard Belzer as Jarvis
- Tom Mason as President Douglas
- Gerry Bamman as Viscott
- Yaphet Kotto as Ressler
- Sam Anderson as Culbertson
- Marshall Bell as General Morgan
- Bruce Jarchow as Barnes

== Production ==
The film was a passion project for executive producer Michael Engelberg, who had shepherded the project through development since the mid 80s with the help of his longtime friend Michael Eisner. In order to help with the production, producer Ralph Winter was hired due to his experience on special effects heavy sci-fi films such as the Star Trek film series and Disney had not done a science fiction film of this type under Eisner's stewardship. British television director Stuart Orme was offered the opportunity to direct, and as Orme had wanted to direct a science fiction project with no such opportunities in the UK, Orme accepted.

== Screenplay ==
The screenplay went through a number of rewrites due to differences between the writers, Terry Rossio and Ted Elliott, who wanted to remain faithful to Heinlein's story, and executives at Disney who wanted an adaptation that they could sell. As a result, the final script leaves out some elements of the novel, while portions of the movie follow the basic plot. Further rewrites were motivated by cost saving measures such as the replacement of the novel's futuristic setting with a contemporary one, and attempts to distance the film from the various derivative works such as adaptations of The Body Snatchers.

== Reception ==
On the review aggregator website Rotten Tomatoes, 29% of 24 critics' reviews are positive, with an average rating of 5.0/10.

=== Critical response ===
Steven Gaydos of Variety wrote: "Fans of sci-fi master Robert A. Heinlein may turn out for the bigscreen spinning of his 1951 tale The Puppet Masters, but only the most undiscriminating monster-pic buff will come away satisfied."

Stephen Holden of The New York Times wrote: "Those who cowered in terror through Alien, in which extraterrestrial monsters exploded out of people's bodies, aren't likely to be overly impressed by the invaders in The Puppet Masters, a science-fiction thriller adapted from Robert A. Heinlein's novel."

Chris Hicks of the Deseret News wrote: "The film's best moments come when the creatures take over the lead characters and their companions fight to bring them back alive.
