= The Wedding (miniseries) =

1998 American TV film

- Based on: The Wedding by Dorothy West
- Written by: Dorothy West; Lisa Jones
- Directed by: Charles Burnett
- Starring: Halle Berry; Eric Thal; Lynn Whitfield
- Music by: Stephen James Taylor
- Country of origin: United States
- Original language: English

Production
- Executive producers: Oprah Winfrey; Kate Forte
- Producer: Doro Bachrac
- Cinematography: Frederick Elmes
- Editor: Dorian Harris
- Running time: 162 minutes
- Production company: Harpo Productions

Original release
- Network: ABC
- Release: February 22 – February 23, 1998

The Wedding is a 1998 television film directed by Charles Burnett. Based on the 1995 novel of the same name by Dorothy West and written for television by West and Lisa Jones, it stars Halle Berry, Eric Thal, and Lynn Whitfield, and was produced by Oprah Winfrey's production company, Harpo Productions. The story touches on the subjects of marriage, race, prejudice, class, and family in 1950s Martha's Vineyard.

The film aired on ABC in two parts on February 22 and February 23, 1998 as part of Black History Month.

== Plot ==
In 1953, Shelby Coles returns to Martha's Vineyard and the Coles family home, in a section of town known as 'The Oval', to wed her white fiancé, jazz pianist and composer Meade Howell. While her black high-society parents initially accept the pair, even arranging the wedding to be held at the mansion, they have growing misgivings as to the pair's ability to withstand the racial prejudice of the time, only made stronger after Meade admits that his own middle-class parents will not be attending the wedding because of their prejudice against their daughter-in-law-to-be.

Through frequent flashbacks throughout, we see the racial, societal and class choices made by Shelby's white great-grandmother on her mother's side, her grandparents and parents to insure the family's standing, even while those choices may have robbed them of the very happiness they sought. While Shelby dismisses and even rebuffs much of their advice, her own doubts grow as she and Meade go through their own current experiences of racism and racial expectations. Seeing her growing misgivings, Lute McNeil, local architect, father and neighbor of the Coleses, sees an opportunity to try to win Shelby's heart, having loved her from afar for some time. With Lute's persistent, sometimes unwanted, attentions, Shelby starts to question her marrying Meade. After a racist incident at a local restaurant, Shelby even confesses to Meade that she doesn't want to spend the rest of her life defending their relationship and asks him to give her time to finally decide.

Meanwhile, Shelby's mother Corinne is battling her own demons within her marriage. Through the flashbacks, we see that her doctor husband Clark married her not for love, but for her lighter-skinned looks and status. In the present, Corinne discovers that Clark is having an affair, planning to leave her for his longtime nurse-assistant, Rachel, after the wedding. However, his inability to resolve his guilt about his marriage and children over the years, and several badly-timed phone calls during the wedding to her leave Rachel sadly resigned to the belief that he will never leave Corinne and she leaves him to marry another. On hearing this, Clark decides to try to spark the love in his marriage again with Corinne.

At the same time, Shelby's sister, Liz has her own tribulations with her darker-skinned husband, Dr. Lincoln Odis. Lincoln's parents were disinvited from Liz and Lincoln's own wedding by Corinne. Corinne cites Lincoln's parents' discomfort with the local community as the reason, but in actuality Corinne disliked Lincoln's parents' working-class status. That act remains a true bone of contention between Lincoln and Corinne, and he initially refuses to attend Shelby's wedding. With prodding, however, from Liz re-affirming her love for him and explaining that her mother's actions, while horrid, were not at all her own feelings, he finally agrees to come.

Meanwhile, Lute has insisted his wife give him a divorce because of her family's prejudice against him and her own ambivalence. Lute's wife has returned from New York to plead her case for reconciliation, suspecting that his request for a speedy divorce in Mexico is spurred by his desire to wed another woman. Lute in a rage forces her out of their home and tries to drive her to the ferry out of town, but in the process accidentally hits his youngest daughter with his car. The noise of their argument has brought out the surrounding neighbors, including Shelby, who, shocked by Lute's vehemence, feels that she 'finally can see who Lute really is', accepting that good character and heart, not race or class, make the human being and turns her heart back to Meade. The two marry in the end.

== Cast ==
- Halle Berry as Shelby Coles
- Eric Thal as Meade Howell
- Lynn Whitfield as Corinne Coles
- Carl Lumbly as Lute McMeil
- Michael Warren as Clark Coles
- Marianne Jean-Baptiste as Ellen Coles
- Charlayne Woodard as Rachel
- Cynda Williams as Liz Odis
- Richard Brooks as Lincoln Odis
- Gabriel Casseus as Hannibal
- Shirley Knight as Gram
