= Laura Soveral =

Portuguese actress

Laura Soveral (23 March 1933 in Benguela, Angola – 12 July 2018) was a Portuguese actress. She performed in more than seventy films from 1966.

== Selected filmography ==
Film
Year	Title	Role	Notes
2014	Cadences obstinées		
2012	Tabu		
2012	O Cônsul de Bordéus		
2007	Sleepwalking Land		
2005	Alice		
1998	Traffic		
1980	Oxalá		
