= Sled Reynolds =

American animal trainer

- Born: December 7, 1950 (age 75); Palmdale, California, United States
- Other names: Paul C. Reynolds; Paul Reynolds; Slad Reynolds; Sled Reynolds
- Occupation: Animal trainer (for films)
- Years active: 1981–present

Paul "Sled" Reynolds (born December 7, 1950), sometimes credited as Paul C. Reynolds, Paul Reynolds, Slad Reynolds, or Sled Reynolds, is an American animal trainer, best known for his work in film.

== Filmography ==
- Tarzan, the Ape Man (1981) (head animal trainer)
- The Beastmaster (1982) (animal trainer)
- Young Warriors (1983) (pig wrangler)
- The Golden Child (1986) (animal trainer)
- Ishtar (1987) (camel trainer)
- Benji the Hunted (1987) (animal trainer)
- Who's That Girl (1988) (animal coordinator)
- War Party (1988) (animal trainer, animal wrangler)
- Indiana Jones and the Last Crusade (1989) (animal trainer: lion)
- Always (1989) (animal trainer)
- Dances with Wolves (1990) (wolf trainer)
- Edward Scissorhands (1990) (animal trainer)
- Don't Tell Mom the Babysitter's Dead (1991) (dog trainer)
- Bingo (1991) (animal trainer)
- Single White Female (1992) (animal trainer)
- Of Mice and Men (1992) (animal trainer)
- Tall Tale (1995) (animal trainer)
- Beastmaster III: The Eye of Braxus (1996) (animal handler)
- The Ghost and the Darkness (1996) (supervising animal trainer)
- Samson and Delilah (1996 miniseries) (lion trainer)
- Hollywood Safari (1997) (animal handler)
- Titanic (1997) (animal trainer)
- Amistad (1997) (animal trainer)
- Flash (1997) (animal coordinator)
- Almost Heroes (1998) (animal wrangler)
- Letters from a Killer (1998) (animal wrangler)
- Practical Magic (1998) (animal handler)
- To Walk with Lions (1999) (animal coordinator)
- The 13th Warrior (1999) (animal trainer: camel)
- Running Free (1999) (head animal trainer)
- Gladiator (2000) (chief animal trainer)
- My First Mister (2001) (animal trainer)
- Hannibal (2001) (animal coordinator)
- Pearl Harbor (2001) (animal coordinator)
- High Crimes (2002) (animal wrangler)
- The Scorpion King (2002) (animal coordinator)
- The 4th Tenor (2002) (animal trainer)
- The Lord of the Rings: The Two Towers (2002) (animal coordinator)
- The Maldonado Miracle (2003) (animal coordinator)
- Deliver Us from Eva (2003) (animal supplier)
- The Rundown (2003) (animal coordinator)
- The Lord of the Rings: The Return of the King (2003) (animal coordinator)
- Cold Mountain (2003) (animal wrangler: USA)
- Flight of the Phoenix (2004) (animal wrangler)
- Last Mountain (2005) (animal trainer)
- Duma (2005) (animal coordinator)
- The Chronicles of Narnia: The Lion, the Witch and the Wardrobe (2005) (animal trainer)
- The Breed (2006) (animal trainer)
- Casino Royale (2006) (animal trainer)
- Epic Movie (2007) (animal wrangler)
- Transformers (2007) (animal coordinator/animal trainer)
- The Game Plan (2007) (animal coordinator)
- Beowulf (2007) (animal wrangler)
- Speed Racer (2008) (animal coordinator)
- The Happening (2008) (animal coordinator: Los Angeles)
- Race to Witch Mountain (2008) (animal coordinator/animal trainer)
- Transformers: Revenge of the Fallen (2009) (animal coordinator/animal trainer)
- Doc West (2009) (animal coordinator)
- The Men Who Stare at Goats (2009) (head wrangler: New Mexico)
- Avatar (2009) (animal trainer coordinator)
- Frozen (2010) (lead animal trainer: wolves)
- Water for Elephants (2011) (head animal trainer/head animal wrangler)
- Real Steel (2011) (animal coordinator/animal trainer)
- Life of Pi (film) (2012) (animal coordinator)
- Django Unchained (2012) (animal trainer)
- Gangster Squad (2013) (animal coordinator/animal trainer)
- Saving Mr. Banks (2013) (animal coordinator/animal trainer)
- The Book of Daniel (film) (2013) (animal wrangler: lions)
