= Maria Monti =

Italian actress and singer

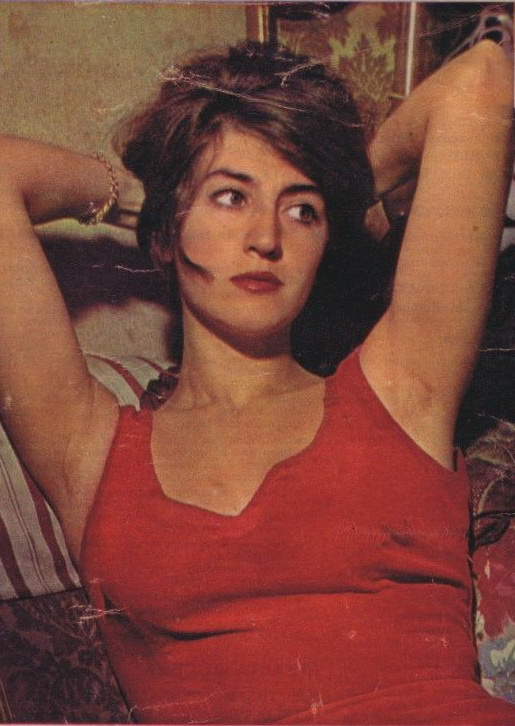
- Monti in 1960
- Born: 26 June 1935 (age 91); Milan, Italy
- Occupations: Actress; Singer

Maria Monti (born 26 June 1935) is an Italian actress and singer.

== Life and career ==
Born in Milan, Monti started her career as a singer in the mid-1950s, performing in the nightclubs of her hometown, soon achieving local success. As a singer, she took part in the Sanremo Music Festival 1961 with "Benzina e cerini", and her repertoire mostly consisted on satirical folk songs. At the same time, she started a parallel activity as a stage actress, and starting from 1959 being also active on television and in films, where she collaborated with Sergio Leone, Bernardo Bertolucci, Alberto Lattuada and Mauro Bolognini. On stage, she is best known for her collaboration with Paolo Poli, for the Garinei-Terzoli-Vaime musical comedy Pardon Monsieur Molière she starred in with Gino Bramieri, and for Giovanni Testori's L'Ambleto.

In 2005, she presented the monologue Canto a me stessa, written by Renata Ciaravino. In 2006, she presented the show Il mostro a due teste in Italian theaters, directed by Claudio Frosi and accompanied by the piano by Marco Persichetti. In 2017, on February 6, Maria Monti returned to the stage after an eleven-year absence at the Teatro Arciliuto in Rome to present her CD Sprazzi di pace, released digitally only in 2021.

== Filmography ==
- Canzoni a tempo di twist (1962)
- La bella di Lodi (1963)
- The Man Who Burnt His Corpse (1964)
- La prova generale (1968)
- Duck, You Sucker! (1971)
- Chronicle of a Homicide (1972)
- The Night of the Devils (1972)
- What Have You Done to Solange? (1972)
- Vermisat (1975)
- Al piacere di rivederla (1976)
- The Red Carnation (1976)
- 1900 (1976)
- Oh, Serafina! (1976)
- Black Journal (1977)
- Wifemistress (1977)
- Nest of Vipers (1977)
- Little Lips (1978)
- Yerma (TV, 1978)
- The Girl from Millelire Street (1980)
- Mary Ward (1985)
- The Strangeness of Life (1987)
- Milan noir (1987)
- Gangsters (1992)
- La medaglia (1997)
- Kaputt Mundi (1998)
- Against the Wind (2000)
- Vento di ponente (TV, 2002)
- Fog and Crimes (TV, 2005)
- Zodiaco (TV, 2008)
- L'ultimo re (2009)
