= Eric Thal =

American film and stage actor (born 1965)

Eric Thal is an American film and stage actor, perhaps best known as Ariel in Sidney Lumet's A Stranger Among Us; Sam Nivens in The Puppet Masters; Samson in Samson and Delilah; Meade Howell in The Wedding; and Rick in Six Degrees of Separation.

== Youth ==
Born in Niskayuna, New York, to Joan, a home-maker, and Herbert L. Thal, Jr., an electrical engineer, Thal, the youngest of five children, was raised on The Main Line of Philadelphia. He began performing as a magician and started studying acting at age 14, with Richard Brewer, formerly of the Hedgerow Theatre. He graduated from The Haverford School and attended Lafayette College for one year, studying engineering and education, before moving to New York to pursue acting. He worked a variety of jobs including telemarketer, waiter, construction worker, janitor, and massage therapist, before being cast in his first film role in 1991.

== Career ==
Thal's film career started with the 1992 thriller A Stranger Among Us, when Sidney Lumet cast him in the lead role of Ariel opposite Melanie Griffith, after he auditioned for a smaller role. The film, written by Robert J. Avarech, portrays a murder that takes place in a Hasidic community, with Thal playing the role of the son of The Rebbe. He went on to play Alex Perkins, opposite Penelope Ann Miller, in The Gun in Betty Lou's Handbag and the character Rick in the film Six Degrees of Separation, alongside Heather Graham and Will Smith. Thal had no scenes with Donald Sutherland in Six Degrees of Separation, but went on to play the role of his son in The Puppet Masters, directed by Stuart Orme. He also worked alongside Drew Barrymore, Jennifer Beals, James LeGros and Jon Stewart in Wishful Thinking. He starred opposite Sarah Polley in Joe's So Mean to Josephine, directed by Peter Wellington. He co-starred alongside Karyn Parsons and Isaiah Washington in Mixing Nia. Other lead roles include Carl Heine, Jr. in Snow Falling on Cedars, directed by Scott Hicks, and the role of Harry opposite Elliot Page in Mouth to Mouth. He also appeared in the romantic comedy film The Good Guy, which premièred at the Tribeca Film Festival.

Thal also appeared in a number of TV mini-series and shows. He starred opposite Elizabeth Hurley and alongside Dennis Hopper, Diana Rigg, and Michael Gambon in the TV movie Samson and Delilah. He played opposite Halle Berry in the TV movie The Wedding, produced by Oprah Winfrey, directed by Charles Burnett, and based on the book by Dorothy West. On February 16, 1998 Jet Magazine's cover featured Halle Berry between Thal and Carl Lumbly, with the title, "Halle Berry Must Choose Between A Black Man And White Man In TV Movie 'The Wedding.'" Thal played Detective John Cahill in the unaired American pilot of Ultraviolet, which was produced by Howard Gordon and Chip Johannessen. He appeared in Law & Order: Special Victims Unit as Tommy Hedges, and twice in Law & Order: Criminal Intent as Didier Foucault (alias Dennis Dupont) and Don Craddock. He was a guest star in the final episode of Hack, alongside David Morse.

Thal originated the role of The Special Witness in Christopher Durang's Sex and Longing on Broadway at The Cort Theatre in 1996.

== Filmography ==
Date	Title	Role
1992	A Stranger Among Us	Ariel
1992	The Gun in Betty Lou's Handbag	Alex Perkins
1993	Six Degrees of Separation	Rick
1994	The Puppet Masters	Sam Nivens
1996	Joe's So Mean to Josephine	Joe
1996	Samson and Delilah (TV movie)	Samson
1997	Wishful Thinking	Jack
1998	The Wedding (TV miniseries)	Meade Howell
1998	Mixing Nia	Matt
1999	Shift (TV movie)	Eddie
1999	Snow Falling on Cedars	Carl Heine, Jr.
1999	Prisoner of Love	Johnny
2000	The $treet (TV series – "Rebound")	Mike
2001	The Shaft	Jeffrey
2001	Law & Order: Criminal Intent (TV series – "The Extra Man")	Didier Foucault (alias Dennis Dupont)
2002	Ed (TV series – "The Road")	Frank
2003	Law & Order: Special Victims Unit (TV series – "Appearances")	Tommy Hedges
2004	Hack (TV series – "The Reckoning")	Danny Jannik
2005	Mouth to Mouth	Harry
2006	Law & Order: Criminal Intent (TV series – "Dollhouse")	Don Craddock
2006	Looking for Sunday	Jared
2008	Paper Angels (short)	Frank Rice
2009	The Good Guy	Stephens

== Personal life ==
Thal lives in New York City. He actively became interested in music in the 1990s and plays guitar, drums, and piano. He is the owner and founder of American English Master and works as a dialect coach.
