= Rosa la rose, fille publique =

1985 film by Paul Vecchiali

Rosa la rose, fille publique is a 1985 French film by Paul Vecchiali.

== Synopsis ==
Rosa is a 20 year old prostitute, the beauty of Les Halles. She is healthy and radiant and does not refuse any fantasy. Men jostle for her attention. Her relationship with her pimp is upended when she falls in love with a laborer after meeting him at a banquet. She ponders starting a new life with him, but there are consequences.

== Cast ==
- Marianne Basler : Rosa
- Jean Sorel : Gilbert
- Pierre Cosso: Julien
- Laurent Lévy : Laurent
- Catherine Lachens : « Quarante »
- Evelyne Buyle : « Trente-cinq »
- Pierre Oudrey : Paulo
- Heinz Schwarzinger : le mataf
- Régine Benedetti : Yvette
- Jean-Louis Rolland : Pierrot
- Jean Bollery : Dédé
- Pascal Guiomar : le serveur
- René Joly : l'accordéonniste
- Stéphane Jobert : Jules
- Daniel Briquet : le légionnaire
- Michel Valette : l'homme bonheur
- Jacques Nolot : Alex
- Noël Simsolo : Jeannot
- Pierre Villaret et Mathieu Rivolier : les hommes
- Claude Hernin-Hilbaut : l'infirmière
- Louis-Michel Colla : le patron du café
- Patrick Fierry : un client
- Marie-Claude Treilhou : « France Profonde »

== Awards and nominations ==
For her role in the film, Marianne Basler was nominated for the César Award for Most Promising Actress at the 12th César Awards.
