= The Street (2000 TV series) =

- Created by: Jeff Rake; Darren Star
- Starring: Christian Campbell; Jennifer Connelly; Giancarlo Esposito; Nina Garbiras; Adam Goldberg; Rick Hoffman; Sean Maher; Tom Everett Scott; Melissa De Sousa; Bridgette Wilson
- Composer: W.G. Snuffy Walden
- Country of origin: United States
- Original language: English
- No. of seasons: 1
- No. of episodes: 12 (5 unaired)

Production
- Executive producers: Darren Star; Jeff Rake; Michael Dinner; Robert C. Thompson
- Running time: 60 minutes
- Production companies: Darren Star Productions; Artists Television Group; Columbia TriStar Television Distribution

Original release
- Network: Fox
- Release: November 1 – December 13, 2000

The Street (stylized as The $treet) is an American drama television series that aired on Fox from November 1 to December 13, 2000. Created by Jeff Rake and Darren Star, only 12 episodes were produced, and the series was pulled from American airwaves after seven episodes aired. The entire show aired overseas.

== Premise ==
The series was about a small brokerage house called Belmont Stevens located in New York City and the lives of its employees.

== Cast ==
=== Main ===
- Tom Everett Scott as Jack Kenderson
- Nina Garbiras as Alexandra "Alex" Brill
- Bridgette Wilson-Sampras as Bridgette Dishell
- Christian Campbell as Tim Sherman
- Melissa De Sousa as Donna Pasqua
- Rick Hoffman as Freddie Sacker
- Sean Maher as Chris McConnell
- Giancarlo Esposito as Tom Divack
- Jennifer Connelly as Catherine Miller
- Adam Goldberg as Evan Mitchell

=== Recurring ===
- Jennie Garth as Gillian Sherman
- Bradley Cooper as Clay Hammond
- Heather Burns as Joanne Sacker

== Episodes ==
No.	Title	Directed by	Written by	Original release date	Prod. code
1	"Pilot"	Michael Dinner	Jeff Rake and Darren Star	November 1, 2000	34–01000
2	"Propheting on Losses"	Michael Dinner	Jeff Rake	November 8, 2000	34–01001
3	"High Yield Bonds"	David Jones	Ellie Herman	November 15, 2000	34–01002
4	"Closet Cases"	Stephen Gyllenhaal	Story by : Jeff Pinkner; Teleplay by : Jeff Rake & Jeff Pinkner	November 22, 2000	34–01003
5	"Hostile Makeover"	Michael Pressman	Rick Eid	November 29, 2000	34–01004
6	"The Ultimatum"	Michael Watkins	Gary Glasberg	December 6, 2000	34–01005
7	"Miracle on Wall Street"	Donna Deitch	Jeff Pinkner	December 13, 2000	34–01006
8	"Rebound"	David Jones	Jeff Rake	Unaired	34–01007
9	"Past Performance"	Donna Deitch	Po Bronson	Unaired	34–01008
10	"Junk Bonds"	John David Coles	Rick Eid	Unaired	34–01009
11	"Turf Wars"	Charles Correll	Jeff Rake	Unaired	34–01010
12	"Framed"	Michael Dinner	Darren Star	Unaired	34–01011

== Production ==
Each episode of the series cost $2.3 million.

== Reception ==
Dalton Ross of Entertainment Weekly gave the series premiere a grade of D+, stating that the "Darren Star created drama plays like a bad Melrose Place episode with obligatory IPO terminology thrown in". Howard Rosenberg of Los Angeles Times was indifferent on the show, calling it "passable but hardly a highlight".
