= Danilo De Girolamo =

Italian voice actor (1956–2012)

- Born: 1 May 1956; Rome, Italy
- Died: 9 May 2012 (aged 56); Rome, Italy
- Occupations: Actor; voice actor; dialogue adapter; dubbing director
- Years active: 1980–2012

Danilo De Girolamo (1 May 1956 – 9 May 2012) was an Italian actor and voice actor.

== Biography ==
Born in Rome, De Girolamo began his career in Florence as an actor in the theatre during the 1980s, and he participated in events such as Festival dei Due Mondi. He later went on to become a voice dubber and worked as a regular dubbing artist for Alan Cumming, Vincent Gallo, Matthew Modine and Ulrich Tukur. Other actors De Girolamo occasionally dubbed included Adam Sandler, Clive Owen, Johnny Depp, Tim Roth, Kenneth Branagh, Colin Firth and Guy Pearce.

De Girolamo was best known for voicing Remus Lupin (portrayed by David Thewlis) in the Italian dubbed broadcasts of the Harry Potter saga as well as James Norrington (portrayed by Jack Davenport) in the Pirates of the Caribbean films. For television, he dubbed Gustavo Fring (portrayed by Giancarlo Esposito) in Breaking Bad and Lorne (portrayed by Andy Hallett) in Angel. In De Girolamo's animated roles, he gave his voice to Master Crane in the Italian dubs of the first two Kung Fu Panda movies, Delbert Doppler in Treasure Planet, Bear, Treelo and various other characters in Bear in the Big Blue House, Fungus in Monsters, Inc., Gurgle in Finding Nemo and he also voiced Guido in various foreign dubbed versions of Cars.

From 2004 until his death in 2012, De Girolamo served as the President of the ANAD, which is the national association of Italian dubbing. As a dubbing director, he directed the dubbed versions of television shows such as Dirty Sexy Money, Hannah Montana and animated shows such as Phineas and Ferb.

== Death ==
De Girolamo died of a sudden heart attack on 9 May 2012, eight days after his 56th birthday.

== Filmography ==
- The Girl from Millelire Street (1980)
- Viaggio a Goldonia - TV miniseries, 1st episode (1982)
- Delitto e castigo - TV miniseries, 2 episodes (1983)
- Tradimento - TV film (1985)
- Piange al mattino il figlio del cuculo - TV film (1989)
- Caro maestro – TV series, 5th episode (1996)
- Grandi domani – TV series, 1st episode (2005)

== Voice work ==
=== Dubbing ===
==== Films (Animation, Italian dub) ====
Year	Title	Role(s)	Ref
1989	All Dogs Go to Heaven	King Gator	
1992	FernGully: The Last Rainforest	Hexxus	
2000	The Little Mermaid II: Return to the Sea	Dash	
2001	Monsters, Inc.	Fungus	
2001	Waking Life	Caveh Zahedi	
2002	The Princess and the Pea	King Laird	
2002	Treasure Planet	Dr. Delbert Doppler	
2003	101 Dalmatians II: Patch's London Adventure	Roger Radcliffe (singing voice)	
2003	Castle in the Sky	Muska	
2003	Finding Nemo	Gurgle	
2004	Mickey, Donald, Goofy: The Three Musketeers	Troubadour	
2004	The Adventures of Ichabod and Mr. Toad	Cyril Proudbottom	
2004	Garfield: The Movie	Persnikitty	
2004	Mulan II	Ling (singing voice)	
2005	Wallace & Gromit: The Curse of the Were-Rabbit	Wallace	
2005	Valiant	Rollo	
2006	Cars	Guido (various foreign dubbed versions)	
2007	Bee Movie	Martin Benson	
2007	Lissi and the Wild Emperor	Father-in-Law	
2008	Kung Fu Panda	Crane	
2008	Star Wars: The Clone Wars	Narrator	
2008	Bolt	Professor	
2009	Monsters vs. Aliens	President Hathaway	
2009	A Town Called Panic	Simon	
2009	Astro Boy	Mr. Squirt	
2010	Tinker Bell and the Great Fairy Rescue	Dr. Griffiths	
2011	Kung Fu Panda 2	Crane	

==== Films (Live action, Italian dub) ====
Year	Title	Role(s)	Original actor	Ref
1990	White Palace	Max Baron	James Spader	
1991	Star Trek VI: The Undiscovered Country	Excelsior Communications Officer	Christian Slater	
1991	Star Trek VI: The Undiscovered Country	Crewman Dax	Michael Snyder	
1991	Star Trek VI: The Undiscovered Country	Samno	Alan Marcus	
1993	Falling Down	Detective Sanchez	Richard Montoya	
1993	Short Cuts	Dr. Ralph Wyman	Matthew Modine	
1994	The Shawshank Redemption	Heywood	William Sadler	
1994	The River Wild	Ranger Johnny	Benjamin Bratt	
1994	Pulp Fiction	Roger	Burr Steers	
1994	The Getaway	Harold Carvey	James Stephens	
1994	Airheads	Rex	Steve Buscemi	
1994	The Crow	Detective Torres	Marco Rodríguez	
1995	GoldenEye	Boris Grishenko	Alan Cumming	
1995	Dracula: Dead and Loving It	Thomas Renfield	Peter MacNicol	
1995	Rob Roy	Archibald Cunningham	Tim Roth	
1995	Bye Bye Love	Dave Goldman	Matthew Modine	
1995	French Kiss	Campbell	Michael Riley	
1996	The Nutty Professor	Reggie Warrington	Dave Chappelle	
1996	Independence Day	Dr. Brackish Okun	Brent Spiner	
1996	Jingle All the Way	Ted Maltin	Phil Hartman	
1996	Barb Wire	Schmitz	Clint Howard	
1996	Twister	Jonas Miller	Cary Elwes	
1997	Bean: The Ultimate Disaster Movie	David Langley	Peter MacNicol	
1997	Mouse Hunt	Lars Smuntz	Lee Evans	
1997	Fever Pitch	Paul Ashworth	Colin Firth	
1997	Liar Liar	Jerry	Cary Elwes	
1997	Lolita	Reverend Rigger	Keith Reddin	
1997	Dobermann	Inspector Baumann	Marc Duret	
1998	A Night at the Roxbury	Steve Butabi	Will Ferrell	
1998	The Wedding Singer	Robbie Hart	Adam Sandler	
1998	The Waterboy	Bobby Boucher	Adam Sandler	
1998	Your Friends & Neighbors	Jerry	Ben Stiller	
1998	Patch Adams	Mitch Roman	Philip Seymour Hoffman	
1998	Buffalo '66	Billy Brown	Vincent Gallo	
1998	Armageddon	Oscar Choice	Owen Wilson	
1999	Titus	Saturninus	Alan Cumming	
1999	Any Given Sunday	Dr. Ollie Powers	Matthew Modine	
1999	The Talented Mr. Ripley	Peter Smith-Kingsley	Jack Davenport	
1999	Inspector Gadget	Sanford Scolex / Dr. Claw	Rupert Everett	
1999	Notting Hill	Martin	James Dreyfus	
2000	Before Night Falls	Bon Bon / Lt. Víctor	Johnny Depp	
2000	Love's Labour's Lost	Berowne	Kenneth Branagh	
2001	Captain Corelli's Mandolin	Mandras	Christian Bale	
2001	Spy Kids	Fegan Floop	Alan Cumming	
2001	The Anniversary Party	Joe Therrian	Alan Cumming	
2001	A.I. Artificial Intelligence	Henry Swinton	Sam Robards	
2001	Taking Sides	Helmut Alfred Rode	Ulrich Tukur	
2001	Jay and Silent Bob Strike Back	Federal Wildlife Marshal Willenholly	Will Ferrell	
2001	Lara Croft: Tomb Raider	Hillary	Chris Barrie	
2001	Sweet November	Vince Holland	Greg Germann	
2001	Training Day	Blue	Snoop Dogg	
2002	Spy Kids 2: The Island of Lost Dreams	Fegan Floop	Alan Cumming	
2002	The Bourne Identity	The Professor	Clive Owen	
2002	Minority Report	Gordon Fletcher	Neal McDonough	
2002	Amen.	Kurt Gerstein	Ulrich Tukur	
2003	Lara Croft: Tomb Raider – The Cradle of Life	Hillary	Chris Barrie	
2003	Pirates of the Caribbean: The Curse of the Black Pearl	James Norrington	Jack Davenport	
2003	2 Fast 2 Furious	Detective Whitworth	Mark Boone Junior	
2003	Spy Kids 3-D: Game Over	Fegan Floop	Alan Cumming	
2003	Le Divorce	Tellman	Matthew Modine	
2003	Dogville	Ben	Željko Ivanek	
2004	Harry Potter and the Prisoner of Azkaban	Remus Lupin	David Thewlis	
2004	Finding Neverland	Nana / Mr. Reilly	Angus Barnett	
2004	Birth	Bob	Arliss Howard	
2005	Son of the Mask	Loki	Alan Cumming	
2005	Nanny McPhee	Vicar	Adam Godley	
2005	Duane Hopwood	Mr. Alonso	Brian Tarantina	
2006	Pirates of the Caribbean: Dead Man's Chest	James Norrington	Jack Davenport	
2006	Invincible	Max Cantrell	Michael Rispoli	
2006	The Lives of Others	Anton Grubitz	Ulrich Tukur	
2006	Christmas in New York	Roosevelt Hotel Director	Jesse Buckler	
2006	The Pursuit of Happyness	Alan Frakesh	Dan Castellaneta	
2007	Harry Potter and the Order of the Phoenix	Remus Lupin	David Thewlis	
2007	Pirates of the Caribbean: At World's End	James Norrington	Jack Davenport	
2007	The Golden Compass	Fra Pavel	Simon McBurney	
2008	The Curious Case of Benjamin Button	Tizzy Weathers	Mahershala Ali	
2008	Milk	Jim Rivaldo	Brandon Boyce	
2008	North Face	Henry Arau	Ulrich Tukur	
2009	Boogie Woogie	Dewey Dalamanatousis	Alan Cumming	
2009	Year One	Prime Minister	David Pasquesi	
2009	The Proposal	Mr. Gilbertson	Denis O'Hare	
2009	Harry Potter and the Half-Blood Prince	Remus Lupin	David Thewlis	
2009	Aliens in the Attic	Nate Pearson	Andy Richter	
2009	Micmacs	François Marconi	Nicolas Marié	
2010	Harry Potter and the Deathly Hallows – Part 1	Remus Lupin	David Thewlis	
2010	The King's Speech	King Edward VIII	Guy Pearce	
2010	Yogi Bear	Mayor R. Brown	Andy Daly	
2011	Harry Potter and the Deathly Hallows – Part 2	Remus Lupin	David Thewlis	
2011	Johnny English Reborn	Patch Quartermain	Tim McInnerny	
2011	Transformers: Dark of the Moon	Donnie	Andy Daly	
2011	Limitless	Morris Brandt	Ned Eisenberg	
2012	Bel Ami	François Laroche	James Lance	

==== Television (Animation, Italian dub) ====
Year	Title	Role(s)	Notes	Ref
1988–1994	Garfield and Friends	Roy	Recurring role	
1990	Cartoon All-Stars to the Rescue	Baby Gonzo	TV film	
1998–1999	Hercules: The Animated Series	Pain	Recurring role	
1999	Teletubbies	Bear	1 episode (season 1, episode 11)	
2000–2002	Mike, Lu & Og	Spiney Porcupine	Recurring role	
2001–2004	House of Mouse	Pain	Recurring role	
2001–2004	House of Mouse	Timothy Q. Mouse	Recurring role	
2001–2006	Bear in the Big Blue House	Bear	Main cast	
2001–2006	Bear in the Big Blue House	Treelo	Main cast	
2001–2006	Bear in the Big Blue House	Various characters	Main cast	
2003–2004	Magic User's Club	Katsuhito Kubo	Recurring role	
2003–2005	Gals!	Nakanishi	Recurring role	
2003–2007	Kim Possible	Frugal Lucre	Recurring role	
2004	Gowap	Gowap	Main cast	
2006–2009	Miss Spider's Sunny Patch Friends	Mr. Mantis	Recurring role	
2007–2008	Jane and the Dragon	Dragon	Main cast	
2008	Armitage III	Coroner	Recurring role	
2011–2012	Kung Fu Panda: Legends of Awesomeness	Crane	Recurring role (season 1)	

==== Television (Live action, Italian dub) ====
Year	Title	Role(s)	Notes	Original actor	Ref
1999	Annie	Daniel Francis "Rooster" Hannigan	TV film	Alan Cumming	
2000	Early Edition	Chuck Fishman	Main cast	Fisher Stevens	
2004–2007	Angel	Lorne	Recurring role (season 2–5)	Andy Hallett	
2005	Casanova	Giacomo Casanova	TV miniseries	David Tennant	
2005–2011	Desperate Housewives	Paul Young	Main cast	Mark Moses	
2010–2012	The Good Wife	Eli Gold	Main cast (season 1–3)	Alan Cumming	
2010–2012	Breaking Bad	Gustavo "Gus" Fring	Recurring role (season 2–4)	Giancarlo Esposito	

==== Video games (Italian dub) ====
Year	Title	Role(s)	Ref
2003	Finding Nemo	Gurgle	
