= Samson and Delilah (1996 miniseries) =

1996 TV series or program

- DVD cover
- Written by: Allan Scott
- Directed by: Nicolas Roeg
- Starring: Eric Thal; Dennis Hopper; Elizabeth Hurley; Diana Rigg; Michael Gambon
- Country of origin: Germany/Italy/United Kingdom/United States
- Original language: English

Production
- Producers: Lorenzo Minoli, Gerald Rafshoon
- Editor: Michael Ellis
- Running time: 172 minutes

Original release
- Network: TNT
- Release: December 8, 1996

Samson and Delilah is a German/Italian/British/American television miniseries that was first shown on TNT in the United States. It was directed by Nicolas Roeg and broadcast December 8, 1996.

== Plot ==
Samson is chosen by God to destroy the Philistines, who have occupied the land of Canaan. He is given the greatest strength ever known to man as long as he remains true to his vow and its conditions, yet he is not convinced of his purpose, preferring instead to spend his time with Philistine company. He eventually falls in love with a Philistine woman and decides to marry her, but is betrayed by her on his wedding day. He soon learns that she was blackmailed by the Philistine leaders who are plotting his demise, and goes to reclaim her, but she has been murdered along with her entire family.

Meanwhile, one of the king's courtiers, Delilah, is convinced of her ability to bring even the mighty Samson to his knees. She engineers a meeting, and Samson is immediately taken with her. They begin a relationship, and Delilah convinces Samson of her love, ultimately seducing him into telling her the secret of his strength, and renders him helpless. Samson is therefore captured by the Philistines, who blind him and make him into a slave, forcing him to grind grain at a millstone. While Delilah does not love him, the film adds a layer of tragic irony at the end. During the final feast in the Temple of Dagon, a guilty or conflicted Delilah approaches the blinded Samson. He mistakenly thinks she is an Israelite woman named Naomi and kisses her forehead in forgiveness, highlighting the depth of her deception. At the celebration of his defeat, Samson is brought in chains to be both an example and entertainment for his captors. Unbeknownst to them, his strength has returned through divine intervention, and as he stands between the two pillars that support the building, he asks God for forgiveness. He then pushes against the pillars, collapsing the building and killing those inside, including himself and Delilah.

== Cast ==
- Eric Thal as Samson
  - Jonathan Rhys Meyers as Young Samson
- Elizabeth Hurley as Delilah
- Dennis Hopper as General Tariq
- Diana Rigg as Mara
- Michael Gambon as King Hanun
- Daniel Massey as Ira
- Paul Freeman as Manoah
- Ben Becker as Prince Sidqa
- Jale Arıkan as Naomi
- Pinkas Braun as Harach
- Alessandro Gassman as Amrok
- Debora Caprioglio as Rani
- Sebastian Knapp as Yoram
  - Matt Green as Elder Yoram
- Karl Tessler as Jehiel
  - Leo Gregory as Young Jehiel
- Luke Mullaney as Amran
  - Tobias Saunders as Young Amran
- Tim Gallagher as Habor
- Mark McGann as Mahal
- Luke de Lacey as Philistine Soldier
- John Forbes-Robertson as Philistine Doctor
- Mary Hanefey as Delilah's Servant
- Neil Robinson as Yoram as Narrator

== Production ==
The film was entirely shot in Ouarzazate, Morocco from early March and late June 1996. The Italian actor Giorgio Francesco Palombi was one of the film's stunt performers. He later appeared in TNT's biblical television film David as Goliath of Gath.

A male African lion from Thousand Oaks, California's Animal Actors of Hollywood named Sudan was trained by Hubert G. Wells, Sled Reynolds and Victoria Vopni. Wells and Reynolds previously trained Sudan in Big Top Pee-wee followed by The Ghost and the Darkness. Animatronic engineers from Jim Henson's Creature Shop in London provided a mechanical lion for the animal's attack sequence.
