= Claude Faraldo =

French actor, director and screenwriter

Claude Faraldo (23 March 1936 – 29 January 2008) was a French actor, screenwriter and film director. He was born to Italian immigrants. He directed the French satirical cult film classic Themroc (1973).

Faraldo was born in Paris, and died in Alès, on 29 January 2008, aged 71.

== Filmography ==
Year	Title	Role	Notes
1976	Les Fleurs du miel		
1980	Two Lions in the Sun		Director
1981	Le jardinier	The Winning Workman	
1984	Mesrine	Charlie Bauer	
1988	Blanc de Chine	Rinaldi	
1994	L'Ange noir	Aslanian	
