= Pham Xuan Nguyen =

Vietnamese literary translator

Phạm Xuân Nguyên
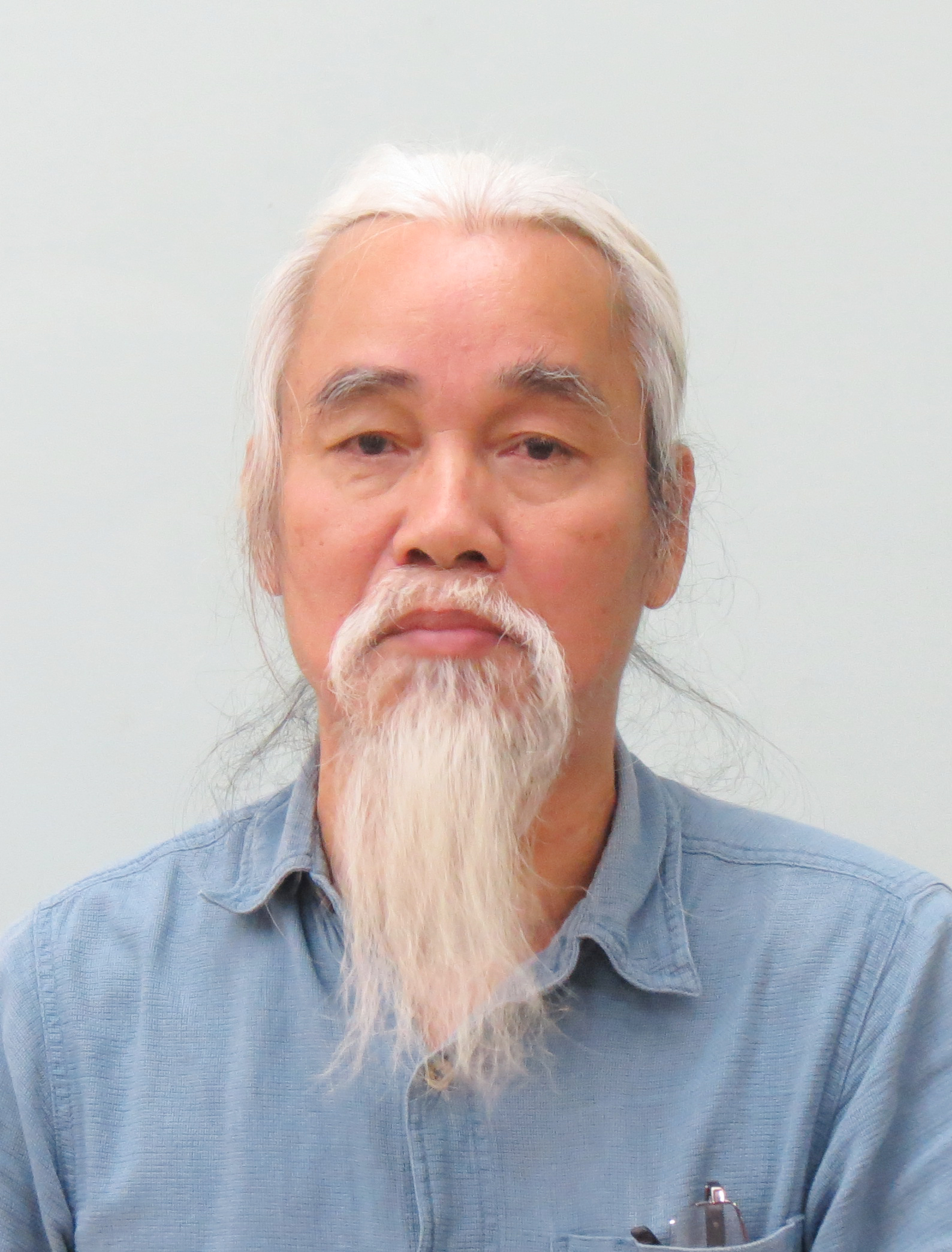
- Nguyên speaking at an event held by the Center for East-West Cultures and Languages (Trung tâm văn hoá ngôn ngữ Đông Tây), 4 December 2008
- Born: 15 May 1958 (age 68); Nghệ An, North Vietnam
- Other name: Ngân Xuyên (pen name)
- Occupations: Writer and literary translator
- Known for: Vietnamese translations of the works of Georges Bataille, Paulo Coelho, Jhumpa Lahiri, Milan Kundera, Haruki Murakami, and others

Phạm Xuân Nguyên (born 15 May 1958), better known by his pen name Ngân Xuyên, is a Vietnamese writer and literary translator.

== Personal life and career ==
Phạm Xuân Nguyên was born in Nghệ An Province. He did his early education in neighbouring Hà Tĩnh Province, where in grade 6 and again in grade 10 he won district and provincial awards for writing. He studied Russian as his foreign language in high school, and continued learning it as a student in the literature department of the University of Hanoi (Trường Đại học Tổng hợp Hà Nội, now part of the Vietnam National University, Hanoi). He interrupted his university studies to serve in the People's Army of Vietnam from 1978 to 1982, and was stationed in Ho Chi Minh City. During that period, he began teaching himself French, and had his first translations of French poetry published in the newspaper Tiền Phong. He went on to become chairman of the Hanoi Writers' Association (Hội Nhà văn Hà Nội).

== Works ==
Phạm Xuân Nguyên speaks Russian, French, and English, and has translated works from all of those languages into Vietnamese. He was first exposed to the works of Milan Kundera in their Russian translations in the Union of Russian Writers journal Foreign Literature («Иностранная литература»), and himself translated Immortality (which was originally in Czech) into Vietnamese from the Russian version.

After he spent more than thirty years translating the works of others under his pen name, his first book of his own under his real name, Nhà văn như Thị Nở (meaning "A Writer like Thị Nở"), was published in 2014. The title is a reference to the character Thị Nở in Nam Cao's 1941 short story Chí Phèo, a woman who is well known for her unattractive appearance. Nhà văn như Thị Nở is a collection of essays of literary criticism, discussing fifty-one Vietnamese writers including Nam Trân, Thế Lữ, Hải Triều, Hoài Thanh, Nguyễn Tuân, Trương Tửu, Bích Khê, Xuân Diệu, Tố Hữu, Nguyễn Huy Tưởng, Nguyễn Hữu Đang, Hoàng Cầm, Trần Dần, Lê Đạt, Phùng Quán, Bùi Ngọc Tấn, Nguyễn Xuân Khánh, Dương Tường, Bảo Ninh, Nguyễn Quang Lập, and Vi Thùy Linh. Nguyên stated that it took him so long to come out with the book because he was too lazy to collect his previous essays and edit them into a coherent whole; in particular, he mentioned the World Cup season as one of the various reasons for his delays in submitting the final version to the publisher Nhã Nam for printing. Editor Diệu Thủy stated that the whole process took more than four years, and that at one time she even jokingly threatened to burn down Nguyên's house in an effort to get him to submit a draft.

== List of translations ==
- 1999: Immortality, Slowness, and Identity (Milan Kundera)
- 2000: Nerves and Senses (Steve Parker)
- 2001: Testaments Betrayed (Les Testaments trahis, Milan Kundera)
- 2001: An Idea for Seven Million (Pomysł za siedem milionów, Jerzy Edigey)
- 2002: Dinosaur (David B. Norman and Angela Milner)
- 2004: The Fifth Mountain (Paulo Coelho)
- 2004: Interpreter of Maladies (Jhumpa Lahiri)
- 2006: Introducing Kierkegaard (Oscar Zárate and Dave Robinson)
- 2008: Sputnik Sweetheart (Haruki Murakami)
- 2008: The Postmodern Condition (Jean-François Lyotard)
- 2012: The Lady, or the Tiger? (Frank Stockton)
- 2013: Literature and Evil (La Littérature et le Mal, Georges Bataille)
