= Marek Bieńczyk =

Polish writer (born 1956)

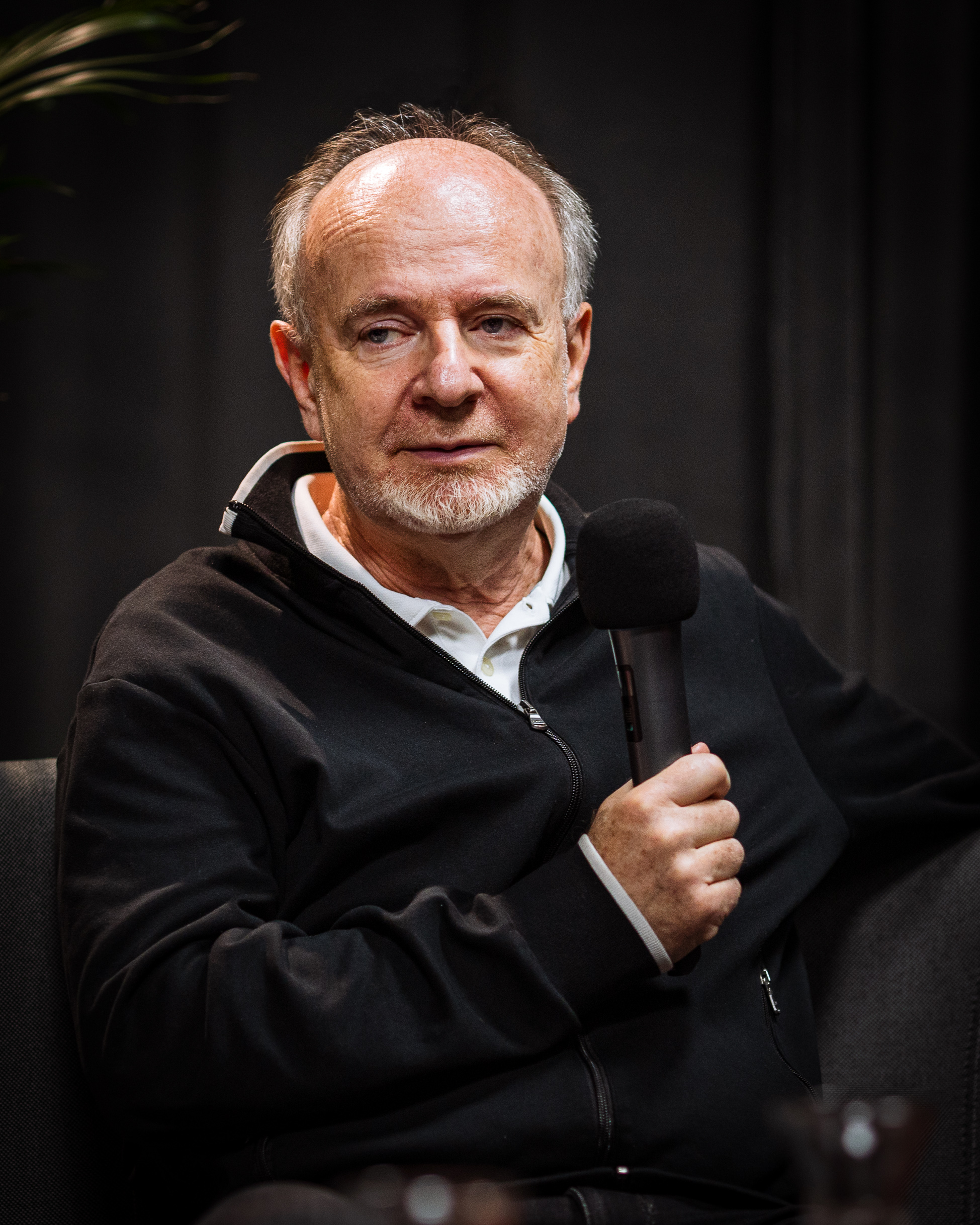
- Marek Bieńczyk (2025)
- Born: 6 July 1956 (age 70); Milanówek, Poland
- Education: University of Warsaw
- Occupations: writer, historian of literature, translator, essayist
- Writing career
- Genre: fiction
- Notable work: Book of Faces (2012)
- Notable awards: Paszport Polityki (1999); Nike Award (2012)

Marek Bieńczyk (Polish pronunciation: [ˈmarɛk ˈbjɛɲt͡ʂɨk]; born 6 July 1956) is a Polish writer, historian of literature, translator, essayist and oenologist. In 2012, he won the Nike Award, Poland's top literary prize, for his collection of essays Book of Faces.

== Life and career ==
Born in 1956 in Milanówek, Poland, he studied Romance Languages and Literature at the University of Warsaw and has worked as a historian at the Institute of Literary Research of the Polish Academy of Sciences (PAN). He is also a visiting professor at the Jagiellonian University in Kraków. He has collaborated with the Tygodnik Powszechny, and the French quarterly L'Atelier du roman. He specializes in Polish literary Romanticism and contemporary French literature. His academic debut was published in 1990 and was titled Czarny człowiek. Zygmunt Krasiński wobec śmierci (The Black Man – Zygmunt Krasiński on Death).

In 1999, his book Tworki won Paszport Polityki and a year later was awarded the Władysław Reymont Literary Prize. In 2012, he received the Nike Award for his collection of essays Książka twarzy (Book of Faces), the title of which ironically alludes to the social networking service Facebook. In 2013, he was awarded the Illustrated Book of the Year Award (Polish national section of IBBY) for his book Książe w cukierni (Prince in a Cake Shop.). In 2019, he was nominated for another Nike Award for his book Kontener.

He is also known as a translator of French-language literature, most notably the works of Milan Kundera (Immortality, Slowness, Identity, The Festival of Insignificance), Emil Cioran and Roland Barthes.

His books have been translated into several languages including Bulgarian, Czech, English, French, German, Hungarian, Spanish and Ukrainian.

He is a member of the Federation of Wine and Spirits Journalists and Writers (FIJEV) and collaborates with the Kraków-based Collegium Vini. He has published articles on wine in such newspapers and magazines as Gazeta Wyborcza, Przekrój, Forbes, Magazyn Wino and Kuchnia. Together with Wojciech Bońkowski, he co-wrote Poland's first oenological guide called Wina Europy (Wines of Europe).

== Selected works ==
- Terminal, Państwowy Instytut Wydawniczy, Warsaw, 1994 (ISBN 83-06-02387-0)
- Tworki, Wydawnictwo Sic!, Warsaw, 1999 (ISBN 83-86056-56-8)

=== Collections of essays ===
- Czarny człowiek. Krasiński wobec śmierci, Literary Research Institute PAN, Warsaw, 1990 (ISBN 83-88560-26-3)
- Szybko i szybciej – eseje o pośpiechu w kulturze, Warsaw, 1996 (ISBN 83-85605-81-9)
- Melancholia. O tych co nigdy nie odnajdą straty, Wydawnictwo Sic!, Warsaw, 1998 (ISBN 83-86056-72-X)
- Oczy Dürera. O melancholii romantycznej, Wydawnictwo Sic!, Warsaw, 2002 (ISBN 83-88807-09-9)
- Przezroczystość, Wydawnictwo Znak, Kraków, 2007 (ISBN 978-83-240-0838-4)
- Książka twarzy, Świat książki – Weltbild Polska, Warsaw, 2011 (ISBN 978-83-247-2472-7)
- Jabłko Olgi, stopy Dawida, Wielka Litera, Warsaw, 2015 (ISBN 978-83-8032-007-9)
- Kontener, Wielka Litera, Warsaw, 2018 (ISBN 978-83-8032-281-3)

== See also ==
- Polish literature
- List of Polish writers
