= Ma Zhencheng =

Chinese translator (1934–2025)

- 马振骋
- Born: March 1934; Shanghai, China
- Died: 17 November 2025 (aged 91)
- Education: Nanjing University
- Occupation: Translator
- Writing career
- Language: Chinese, French
- Period: 1980–?
- Genre: Novel
- Notable works: Montaigne essays Complete Works (3 volumes); The Little Prince

Chinese name
- Traditional Chinese: 馬振騁
- Simplified Chinese: 马振骋
Transcriptions
Standard Mandarin
- Hanyu Pinyin: Mǎ Zhènchěng

Ma Zhencheng (Chinese: 马振骋; March 1934 – 17 November 2025) was a Chinese translator. He is the first person in China to translate The Little Prince, and was also praised as the best translator of The Little Prince. He also translated some of the works of the French novelists Michel de Montaigne, Milan Kundera, André Gide, and Marguerite Duras into Chinese.

== Life and career ==
Ma was born in Shanghai in March 1934. He graduated from Nanjing University, where he majored in French language and literature. After university, he taught at Beijing Institute of Light Industry (now Beijing Technology and Business University). After the Cultural Revolution, he taught at Shanghai Second Medical University (now Shanghai Jiao Tong University School of Medicine) successively. In 1980, he began translating French literary works. In 1990, at the age of 56, he pursued advanced studies in France.

Ma died on 17 November 2025, at the age of 91.

== Translations ==
- Montaigne essays Complete Works (3 volumes) (蒙田全集)
- The Little Prince (小王子)
- The Song of Roland (罗兰之歌)
- Slowness (慢)
- The Festival of Insignificance (庆祝无意义)
- Wonderful Events on Beautiful Valley Street (美丽谷街奇妙事)
- La Symphonie pastorale (田园交响曲)
- Strait is the Gate (窄门)
- Limonov (搅局者)
- (被扼杀的是莫扎特)
- Truck (卡车)
- Tarquinian Pony (塔尔奎尼亚的小马)
- Noanoa (诺阿诺阿)
- Witch: Satan's Lover (发现之旅 女巫：撒旦的情人)
- Skota's Sun (斯科塔的太阳)

== Awards ==
- Limonov (Emmanuel Carrère) - Fu Lei Prize for Translation and Publishing, 2017.
