= Beatriz de Moura =

Brazilian-born Spanish publisher and translator (1939–2026

- Born: 1939; Rio de Janeiro, Brazil
- Died: 17 April 2026 (aged 86–87); Barcelona, Spain
- Education: University of Geneva
- Occupations: Publisher; Translator

Beatriz de Moura (1939 – 17 April 2026) was a Brazilian-born Spanish publisher and translator.

== Life and career ==
Born in Rio de Janeiro in 1939, de Moura grew up in a family of diplomats and travelled often in her youth. She studied at the University of Geneva. She moved to Catalonia in 1961 and worked for numerous publishing houses in Barcelona, a time during which she also became close with Esther Tusquets. In 1968, she married Òscar Tusquets, with whom she co-founded Tusquets Editores the following year. Their first two publications were collective works titled Cuadernos ínfimos and Cuadernos Marginales. Situated on Barcelona's Avinguda Diagonal, the publishing house translated numerous works into Spanish. They also distributed works by Spanish authors such as Octavio Paz, Adolfo Bioy Casares, and Jorge Luis Borges.

De Moura was credited with the worldwide distribution of Spanish authors such as Enrique Vila-Matas, Javier Cercas, and Fernando Aramburu. She also translated works from French into Spanish, such as Identity and Ignorance by Milan Kundera. In 2012, she signed an agreement with Grupo Planeta to manage Tusquets Editores and in 2017, she donated the publishing house's archives to the Biblioteca Nacional de España.

De Moura died in Barcelona on 17 April 2026.

== Awards ==
- Knight of the Ordre des Arts et des Lettres (1998)
- Editorial Merit award at the Guadalajara International Book Fair (1999)
- Creu de Sant Jordi (2006)
- Gold Medal of Merit in the Fine Arts (2010)
