= Unbearable Lightness =

Unbearable Lightness may refer to:

- The Unbearable Lightness of Being, a 1984 novel written by Czech author Milan Kundera
- The Unbearable Lightness of Being (film), a 1988 film based on the Kundera novel
- Unbearable Lightness, the autobiography of Australian actress Portia de Rossi
