= Farewell Waltz (disambiguation) =

Farewell Waltz may refer to:

- Waltz in A-flat major, Op. 69, No. 1 (Chopin), also called the "Farewell Waltz"
- The Farewell Waltz (1928 film), a 1928 French film by Henry Roussel
- Farewell Waltz (film), 1934 German film distributed in U.S. 1939 by Columbia Pictures
- "Farewell Waltz in G major", an 1831 piano work by Mikhail Glinka
- "Farewell Waltz", a work by Charles Nolcini (1802-1844)
- "Farewell Waltz", a song from Waterloo Bridge (1940 film)
- "Farewell Waltz", a solo piano composition by Alexander Peskanov
- The Farewell Waltz, a 1972 Czech-language novel by Milan Kundera
