= The Questionnaire =

The Questionnaire may refer to:

- The Questionnaire (novel by Salomon), a 1951 novel by the German writer Ernst von Salomon
- The Questionnaire (novel by Gruša), a 1978 novel by the Czech writer Jiří Gruša

== See also ==
- Questionnaire
- Questionnaire (horse)
