= Encounter: Essays =

2009 essay collection by Milan Kundera

Encounter
- Title page for Une rencontre (2009)
- Author: Milan Kundera
- Original title: Une rencontre
- Language: French
- Publisher: Éditions Gallimard
- Publication date: 26 March 2009
- Publication place: France
- English publication date: 2010
- Pages: 208
- ISBN: 9782070122844

Encounter: Essays (French: Une rencontre) is a 2009 essay collection by the Czech-French writer Milan Kundera. It consists of essays on the works of writers, composers and painters of varying fame and recognition.

== Contents ==
1. The Painter's Brutal Gesture: On Francis Bacon
2. Novels, Existential Soundings
  - The Comical Absence of the Comical (Dostoyevsky: The Idiot)
  - Death and the Fuss (Louis-Ferdinand Céline: From Castle to Castle)
  - Love in Accelerating History (Philip Roth: The Professor of Desire)
  - The Secret of the Ages of Life (Gudbergur Bergsson: The Swan)
  - The Idull, the Daughter of Horror (Marek Bieńczyk: Tworki)
  - The Debacle of Memories (Juan Goytisolo: The Curtain Falls)
  - The Novel and Procreation (Gabriel García Márquez: One Hundred Years of Solitude)
3. Blacklists, or Divertimento in Homage to Anatole France
4. The Dream of Total Heritage
  - A Dialogue on Rabelais and the Misomusists
  - The Dream of Total Heritage in Beethoven
  - The Arch-Novel: An Open Letter for the Birthday of Carlos Fuentes
  - The Total Rejection of Heritage, of Iannis Xenakis (a text published in 1980, with two interventions from 2008)
5. Beautiful Like a Multiple Encounter
6. Elsewhere
  - Exile as Liberation According to Věra Linhartová
  - The Untouchable Solitude of a Foreigner (Oscar Milosz)
  - Enmity and Friendship
  - Faithful to Rabelais and the Surrealists Who Delved into Dreams
  - On the Two Great Springs, and on the Škvoreckýs
  - From Beneath You'll Breathe the roses (The Last Visit with Ernest Breleur)
7. My First Love
  - The Long Race of a One-Legged Runner
  - The Most Nostalgic Opera
8. Forgetting Schoenberg
  - No Celebration (a text published in 1995 in the Frankfurter Rundschau together with other pieces celebrating the hundredth anniversary of the birth of cinema)
  - What Will Be Left of You, Bertolt?
  - Forgetting Schoenberg
9. The Skin: Malaparte's Arch-Novel
