= Peter Kussi =

Peter Kussi (27 April 1925 – 2012) was a Czech scholar and translator.

Born in Prague in 1925 he emigrated to the United States with his parents as a teenager in 1939. and later taught Czech language and Czech literature at Columbia University from 1979 to 2001. He is best known for his translation of the works of Milan Kundera, among them the novel Immortality which won the Independent Foreign Fiction Prize. He also edited an anthology of the works of Karel Čapek.

== Selected translations ==
- 1974 – Life Is Elsewhere by Milan Kundera (New York, NY; Knopf)
- 1974 – Miss Silver's Past by Josef Škvorecký (New York, NY; Grove Press)
- 1976 – The Farewell Party by Milan Kundera (New York, NY; Knopf)
- 1983 – The Questionnaire by Jiří Gruša (New York, NY; Vintage Books)
- 1990 – Immortality by Milan Kundera (New York, NY; Harper Collins)
- 1993 – What Ownership's All About by Karel Poláček (North Haven, CT; Catbird Press)
- 1996 – The Tenor Saxophonist's Story by Josef Škvorecký (Hopewell, NJ; Ecco Press)
