= Lâm Uyển Nhi =

Vietnamese model

Lâm Uyển Nhi (born on 5 May? in 1975 in Nha Trang – died on 13 October in 2007 in Hanoi) was a beauty contest winner from Vietnam. After she won a beauty contest in Nha Trang in 1989, she quit school to establish a business in Ho Chi Minh City. Nhi was born into a family of eight sisters. Although her father left when she was young, she grew up in the loving arms of her mother. Her family life was also extremely difficult. Later on in life, she became addicted to drugs, became a prostitute, and infected with HIV. She lived the last days at the Center for Social Labour Education and died in 2008.

She is a character in the program "The contemporary" on Vietnam Television, and was the subject of long-term series of reports on major newspapers.

== Family and social life ==
Her father was an officer of the Republic of Vietnam Air Force, although he evacuated overseas after the Vietnam War. Gang Pham Chi Tin, nicknamed "Tin pales," got Nhi from adoption and placed her on the road to eventually becoming a beauty contestant winner in 1989.

== Documentary on her life ==
In 2008, TFS studio made a television series called Am Tinh about the life of Lam Nhi. Directed by writer Nguyen Quang Lap, Miss Vietnam 2006 Mai Phuong Thuy played the role of Lam in the series.
