= The Curtain (essay) =

Book by Milan Kundera

First edition (French)

The Curtain is a seven-part essay by Milan Kundera, along with The Art of the Novel and Testaments Betrayed composing a type of trilogy of book-length essays on the novel.

The Curtain was originally published as Le Rideau, in French in April 2005 by Gallimard. It was published in English on 30 January 2007 by HarperCollins.
