= The Joke (novel) =

1967 novel by Milan Kundera

- First edition (Czech)
- Author: Milan Kundera
- Original title: Žert
- Language: Czech
- Genre: satirical novel
- Publisher: Československý spisovatel (Czech); Coward-McCann (US)
- Publication date: 1967
- Publication place: Czechoslovakia
- English publication date: 1969
- Media type: Print (Hardback & Paperback)
- Pages: 296 pp
- ISBN: 978-0-06-099505-8
- OCLC: 28124158

The Joke (Czech: Žert) is Milan Kundera's first novel, originally published in 1967. It describes how a student's private joke derails his life, and the entwined stories of his lovers and friends grappling with the shifting roles of folk traditions and religion in Communist Czechoslovakia.

== Plot ==
Like most of Kundera's novels, the book is divided into seven parts; the parts switch among the viewpoints of four characters. Ludvik Jahn has been expelled from school and the Communist Party for his irreverence. Jaroslav is an old friend with a cimbalom band that Ludvik had once played in. Helena Zemánková is a radio reporter going to interview Jaroslav, and the wife of Ludvik's old nemesis. Kostka is a Christian foil for Ludvik, who spars with his life philosophy.

The novel opens with Ludvik back in his hometown in Moravia for the first time in years, startled to recognize the woman cutting his hair, though neither acknowledges the other. He reflects on the joke that changed his life in the early 1950s over the next several chapters of flashback. Ludvik was a dashing, witty, and popular student who, like most of his friends, supported the still-young Communist regime. During their summer break, a girl in his class wrote to him about "optimistic young people filled through and through with the healthy spirit" of Marxism; he replied caustically, "Optimism is the opium of mankind! A healthy spirit stinks of stupidity! Long live Trotsky!"

The girl, under pressure, shared the contents of the letter with others in the Party at school, who did not find it funny. Commissions were convened to investigate Ludvik, who remained defiant, culminating in a plenary session — led by his peer, Pavel Zemanek — in which he was unanimously expelled from the Party and from the college. At the wedding of his old friend Jaroslav, whom he had once encouraged to revive Moravian folk music under the Party banner, Ludvik found that his stance toward that revival had turned bitter.

Having lost his student exemption, he was drafted into the Czech military, where alleged subversives formed work brigades, and he spent the next few years working in the mines at a labor camp in Ostrava. Though he remained a believer in the Party, he was treated like an enemy of it, was lumped with other enemies, and eventually resigned himself to their lot. The only respite was occasional leaves, during which the soldiers went into town to flirt with girls, but the soldiers' hijinks continually jeopardized their meager freedoms. During those scarce breaks, Ludvik fell in love with a girl, Lucie, who began to come to the fence of the labor camp each day with flowers. At great personal risk, Ludvik arranged a time when he could sneak away to sleep with her, but in the borrowed apartment, Lucie rejected his advances, Ludvik grew angry, and they separated.

Back in the present day where the novel began, Ludvik has become a successful but bitter scientist. He sees an opportunity for revenge when he meets the radio reporter Helena and learns she is married to Zemanek, who had led Ludvik's expulsion from the Party. Ludvik decides to seduce Helena in his old hometown to hurt Zemanek. He arranges to borrow the apartment of Kostka, who had himself been pushed out of the Party for his Christian faith; years prior, Ludvik had helped him find a good job. Ludvik triumphantly sleeps with Helena, but she then reveals that she has been separated from her husband for years. In fact, Zemanek has taken a mistress, and Ludvik has done him a favor by encouraging Helena to divorce him.

Ludvik meets with Kostka, who confirms that the girl in the barbershop had been Lucie, and goes on to say that he knew her well: he had learned of her past traumas, converted her to Christianity, and cheated on his wife with her. Ludvik is disturbed to realize that Kostka knew Lucie far better than he, despite his obsession, ever had. His revenge on Zemanek thwarted, his memory of Lucie confused, Ludvik wishes he could erase his years of pointless mistakes, and wants to escape Helena and his hometown as soon as possible, but he misses his train.

In the town, it is the day of the Ride of the Kings, a Moravian springtime folk festival. Jaroslav's son has been chosen to play the masked, silent King who rides through the town on horseback; Jaroslav, as a proponent of the folk traditions, is immensely proud. Ludvik runs into Zemanek, who introduces him to his young mistress; Ludvik is further horrified to realize that, in her mind, there is no ideological difference between Ludvik and Zemanek: they both belong to an obsolete generation. They see Helena and her assistant, they exchange innuendos, and Zemanek leaves with his mistress. Helena believes she will be leaving with Ludvik, but he, incapable of explaining the tortuous reasoning of his cruel stunt, simply tells her he does not love her and will never see her again.

Ludvik muses that errors are not exceptional in history; they are the norm. Alone in a cafe, he reflects on a pair of common delusions: that of eternal memory, and that of redressibility. In his view, nothing will ever be redressed by revenge or forgiveness, but it will not matter, because it will be forgotten. Meanwhile, the heartbroken Helena swallows an entire bottle of what she believes are analgesics. She writes Ludvik a suicide note and gives it to her unsuspecting assistant to give to him. When the assistant finds Ludvik in the cafe and Ludvik reads the note, they race to find Helena, only to find that the bottle had instead contained embarrassingly non-fatal laxatives.

Meanwhile, Jaroslav is despondent: he learns that the child on the horse is not his son, who, uninterested in the old-fashioned Ride, had instead snuck away to watch motorcycle races. Jaroslav angrily confronts his wife, smashes plates and chairs in the kitchen, and runs away with his violin. He falls asleep in a field where Ludvik, himself wandering, finds him. Ludvik takes pity on his broken friend, and asks to play with him. Rejuvenated, they go to the band's concert together, where Ludvik takes turns on the clarinet. As the crowd grows raucous, Jaroslav suffers a heart attack. Ludvik, assuming Jaroslav will survive, imagines the second half of his friend's life will be dimmer, and realizes that "one's destiny is often complete long before death."

== Publication and translations ==
The manuscript was completed in 1965 in Prague, but complaints from censors delayed its publication in Czechoslovakia until 1967. It was then banned in 1968 when the Soviet Union invaded and crushed the Prague Spring. After some years of pushing for reform, Kundera fled to Paris in 1975, and his Czech citizenship was revoked.

The first English translation was published in London in 1969. Kundera was dismayed to realize it was heavily modified and abridged, with a different number of parts in a different order. Unable to leave the country, he complained in a letter to the Times Literary Supplement. A second English translation was published in New York soon after, which respected the sequence of parts but still shortened many. Kundera's complaints resulted in an unabridged third translation in 1970, but he remained unhappy with the style. After Michael Henry Heim translated Kundera's The Book of Laughter and Forgetting, he was enlisted for a fourth English translation, published in 1982, which Kundera referred to as "the first valid and authentic version." But he had not read the translation carefully; when his editor Aaron Asher suggested republishing The Joke, they collaborated on a methodical word-by-word revision, resulting in the publication of a fifth and final English translation in 1992.

== Legacy ==
John Updike called The Joke "a thoughtful, intricate, ambivalent novel… It is an impressive work, if not altogether great yet with the reach of greatness in it." Louis Aragon called it "one of the greatest novels of the century." Philip Roth called it "[a] direct and realistic book, openly reflective about the issues it raises—proceeding by means of philosophical thoughtfulness and accurate observation of a fairly broad spectrum of 'politicized' citizens, it is something like a cross between Dos Passos and Camus". Regarding how Kundera was persecuted for its publication much like his protagonist was persecuted for a joke, Roth said, "that he has received from reality such verification of what was, after all, only a literary invention, must furnish some consolation to a writer so attuned to harsh irony".

In 1968, The Joke was adapted into a film by Czech New Wave director Jaromil Jireš. Released in February 1969, some six months after the August 1968 Warsaw Pact invasion that ended the Prague Spring, the film was initially successful in theaters before it was pulled from distribution and banned for the next 20 years.

The novel was referenced in The Fall's song "The Joke" on the album Cerebral Caustic. The song's refrain is, "The Joke! Five years in a PC camp – The Joke!", linking humourless Eastern Bloc authoritarianism to political correctness.

== See also ==
- Le Monde's 100 Books of the Century
