= Life Is Elsewhere =

Novel by Milan Kundera

- First edition (English)
- Author: Milan Kundera
- Original title: Život je jinde
- Translator: Peter Kussi
- Language: Czech
- Genre: Satirical novel
- Publisher: Éditions Gallimard (France); Alfred A. Knopf (US)
- Publication date: 1973
- Publication place: Czechoslovakia
- English publication date: 1974
- Media type: Print (Hardback & Paperback)
- Pages: 289 pp
- ISBN: 9780394480107
- OCLC: 1069235002

Life Is Elsewhere (Czech: Život je jinde) is a Czech-language novel by Milan Kundera finished in 1969. It was first published in French in 1973 (La vie est ailleurs). Set in Czechoslovakia before, during, and after the Second World War, it tells the story of a young poet Jaromil and his mother who cling to each other as Jaromil tries to find artistic fame and advance the revolution at the expense of his most intimate relationships.

== Plot ==
When Jaromil's mother learns she is pregnant in Prague, his father discreetly recommends an abortion, and the mother bursts into tears. The father relents and agrees to marry her.

Jaromil is a precocious child; at five, he says things like "Life is like weeds", which his Mama takes to be very profound and pins to the walls of their house. At school he shows off and makes no friends except for the janitor's son.

War breaks out. Mama wants to try to have another child, but her husband says he never even wanted one, and refuses. Mama feels her only love is her son; she takes Jaromil to a spa town, where they meet a painter and teacher, who compliments the "original inner world" visible in Jaromil's drawings. He begins to tutor Jaromil, and begins an affair with Mama, which she soon stops out of a sense of propriety.

Jaromil imagines a dashing character, Xavier, who lives myriad fantastic lives; every time he falls asleep, he enters another dream within a dream.

Jaromil's father grows increasingly absent during the war, and one day Mama is informed that he was killed. She feels romantically liberated, but Jaromil chafes imagining her betraying his father's memory. She learns her husband had had an affair with a Jewish woman, who was taken to Theresienstadt during the war; he had attempted to rescue his mistress, and had died in the process.

As Jaromil awkwardly attempts to begin romantic advances toward girls, a Communist revolution begins in the country, and he is gripped by revolutionary fervor, and finds solidarity with the party. He also begins to find a measure of literary acclaim for his poems, which are published in some small newspapers. He uses his poetry to woo a redhead girl he had met at a market checkout counter, and reconnects with the janitor's son, who has become a policeman, and invites Jaromil to read at a symposium of well-known party poets.

Jaromil is tortured by the fact that he was a virgin when he first slept with the redhead, and she was not; he is tortured by the idea that his power over her is limited in any way. When the redhead is fifteen minutes late for a date, Jaromil berates her, and she eventually invents an excuse that she was late because she had to say goodbye to her brother before he illegally emigrates from the country. To her surprise, he reports her brother to the janitor's son, who eagerly thanks Jaromil for his loyalty.

The next day, the redhead and her brother are arrested. Jaromil catches a cold, attends a party, gets insulted, starts an argument, and ends up locked outside in the freezing night. He catches pneumonia and dies with his mother by his side. When the redhead gets out of prison after three years (with her brother still imprisoned), she goes to the apartment of a widower with whom she had been sleeping while she'd been with Jaromil. He tells her Jaromil had died. The narrator relates that in the present day, nobody remembers Jaromil or his poems.

== Publication ==
Kundera finished writing the novel in Bohemia in 1969. French publisher Claude Gallimard visited Kundera in Prague, encouraged him to emigrate to France, and smuggled the manuscript back to France, where it was published by Éditions Gallimard in 1973. An English translation appeared in 1976; unsatisfied, Kundera revised the French translation in 1985, from which Aaron Asher re-translated the book into English in 2000.

Like most of Kundera's novels, the book is divided into seven parts, but when it was almost finished, it only had six. "I didn’t feel satisfied. Suddenly I had the idea of including a story that takes place three years after the hero’s death—in other words, outside the time frame of the novel," said Kundera. "Immediately, the novel’s architecture had become perfect."

The name "Life Is Elsewhere" is taken from a line in Arthur Rimbaud's A Season in Hell, in the section "The Foolish Virgin", which says: "He was very nearly a child… His mysterious ways seduced me. I forgot all my earthly duties in order to follow him. O this life! Real life is elsewhere. We aren't of this earth. I go where he goes, how can’t I? And yet he blows up at me all the time, me—poor soul. That demon! He’s doubtless a demon, for he is certainly not a man." Kundera's book often compares events in Jaromil's life to those in the biographies of various real poets, including Rimbaud, and claims that "life is elsewhere" was a revolutionary slogan written by students on the walls of the Sorbonne.

== Reception ==
The novel won the Prix Médicis in 1973. Reviewing the book in the New York Times in 1974, Paul Theroux described Kundera as "a magnificent short‐story writer and reasonably good novelist". In a postnote to the French edition, François Ricard wrote, "Along with Don Quixote and Madame Bovary, Life Is Elsewhere is perhaps the harshest work ever written against poetry."
