= Immortality (novel) =

1988 novel by Milan Kundera

- First English edition (publ. Grove Weidenfeld)
- Author: Milan Kundera
- Original title: Nesmrtelnost
- Translator: Peter Kussi
- Publication date: 1990
- Publication place: France
- English publication date: 1991
- Pages: 358

Immortality (Czech: Nesmrtelnost) is a novel in seven parts, written by Milan Kundera in 1988 in Czech. It was first published in 1990 in French, and then translated into English by Peter Kussi and published in the UK in 1991. The story springs from a casual gesture of a woman, seemingly to her swimming instructor. Immortality is the last of a trilogy that includes The Book of Laughter and Forgetting and The Unbearable Lightness of Being.

== Plot ==
Divided into seven parts, the novel centers on Agnes, her husband Paul, and her sister Laura. Several of the storylines involve real historical figures.

1. The Face establishes these characters.
2. Immortality describes Goethe's fraught relationship with Bettina, a young woman who aspires to create a place for herself in the pantheon of history by controlling Goethe's legacy after his death.
3. Fighting describes Agnes and Laura fight, while focusing on the deteriorating state of Laura's relationship with Bernard Bertrand.
4. Homo Sentimentalis describes Goethe's afterlife and postmortem friendship with Ernest Hemingway.
5. Chance describes Agnes' death, intersecting with a conversation between Kundera and Professor Avenarius.
6. The Dial introduces a new character, Rubens, who had an affair with Agnes years prior to the onset of the main events in the plot.
7. The Celebration concludes the novel in the same health club where Kundera first observed the inspirational wave gesture.

The novel is at times narrated by a self-insertion of Kundera. At the start, this narrator sees a woman wave and creates the character of Agnes: "I was strangely moved. And then the word Agnes entered my mind. Agnes. I had never known a woman by that name."

Later, the Kundera character says: "A novel shouldn't be like a bicycle race but a feast of many courses. I am really looking to Part 6. A completely new character will enter the novel. And at the end of that part he will disappear without a trace. He causes nothing and leaves no effects. That is precisely what I like about him. Part 6 will be a novel within a novel, as well as the saddest erotic story I have ever written."
