= Jiří Gruša =

Human rights activist (1938–2011)

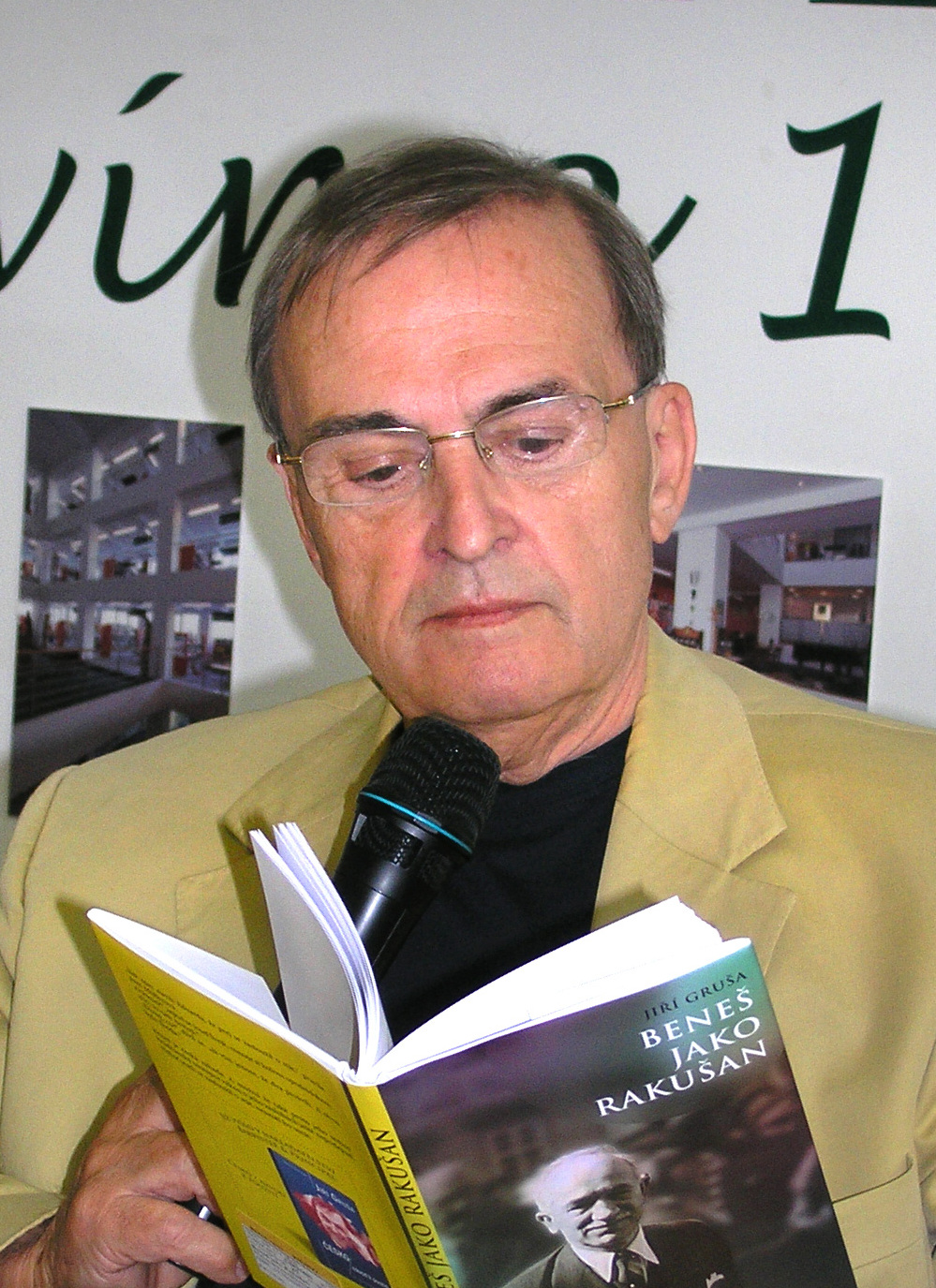
- Jiří Gruša in 2011
- Born: November 10, 1938; Pardubice, Czechoslovakia (present-day Czech Republic)
- Died: October 28, 2011 (aged 72); Bad Oeynhausen, North Rhine-Westphalia, Germany
- Occupations: Poet; novelist; translator; diplomat; politician
- Children: Martin Gruša
- Writing career
- Notable awards: Jaroslav Seifert Prize (2002)

President of PEN International
- In office October 2003 – October 2009
- Preceded by: Homero Aridjis
- Succeeded by: John Ralston Saul

Signature
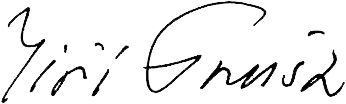

Jiří Gruša (10 November 1938, in Pardubice – 28 October 2011, in Bad Oeynhausen) was a Czech poet, novelist, translator, diplomat and politician.

== Life and career ==
Gruša was born in Pardubice, then Czechoslovakia (present-day Czech Republic), and later moved to Prague. He graduated from the Philosophical Faculty of Charles University in Prague. He worked for periodicals Tvář, Sešity and Nové knihy.

He started coming under the scrutiny of the communist regime of then Czechoslovakia in 1969 because of his writings. He was banned from publishing and had to work in a construction cooperative. He took part in distribution of samizdat literature. He was arrested in 1974 for "the crime of initiating disorder" after distributing nineteen copies of his first novel, Dotazník (The Questionnaire) and voicing his intention to have it published in Switzerland. After world-wide protest, he was released after two months. He later became a signatory of the human rights document, Charter 77. In 1981 his citizenship was revoked, and between 1982 and 1990 he lived in the Federal Republic of Germany.

In 1990 conditions in Czechoslovakia became more favorable and he returned to work for the Ministry of Foreign Affairs. From 1991 to 1997, he served as an ambassador to Germany. Later, he joined the minority government of Václav Klaus as a Minister of Education. The government lost support of the opposition parties and President Václav Havel orchestrated establishment of a new caretaker government. Even though Gruša was a non-party minister, he was replaced by Jan Sokol. He served as an ambassador to Austria until 2004. From 2005 to 2009 he was Director of the Diplomatic Academy of Vienna. From 2004 to 2009 he was the President of PEN International.

Gruša participated in standardisation of the term "Tschechien" as the official name of the Czech Republic in German language. See Name of the Czech Republic for overview.

Gruša died at the age of 72 on 28 October 2011 during a heart operation in Germany. Václav Havel wrote (before his own death a month and a half later on 18 December) that Gruša was "one of a few close people whom I deeply respected and who have left this world recently."

== Awards and honors ==
- 2007: Chevalier of the Legion of Honor of France
- 2006: New Culture of New Europe Award
- 2002: Jaroslav Seifert Prize

== Works ==
English translated

- Franz Kafka of Prague, Trans. Eric Mossbacker.
- The Questionnaire, Trans. Peter Kussi.

Czech language

- Umění stárnout [The Art of Aging]
- Gebrauchsanweisung für Tschechien und Prag [Instruction Manual for the Czech Republic and Prague]
- Grušas Wacht am Rhein aneb Putovní ghetto [The Watch on the Rhein]

Original in German

- Beneš als Österreicher Wieser Verlag, Klagenfurt 2012 ISBN 9783990290088

Non-profit organization positions
Preceded by Homero Aridjis	International President of PEN International; 2003–2009	Succeeded by John Ralston Saul
