= The Farewell Waltz =

1972 novel by Milan Kundera

- First English edition
- Author: Milan Kundera
- Original title: Valčík na rozloučenou
- Translator: Peter Kussi
- Language: Czech
- Publisher: Alfred A. Knopf
- English publication date: 1976
- ISBN: 0-06-099700-1
- OCLC: 37663187
- Dewey Decimal: 891.8/6354 21
- LC Class: PG5039.21.U6 V313 1998

The Farewell Waltz (Czech: Valčík na rozloučenou) is a Czech-language novel by Milan Kundera written in 1972. Kundera was then living in Czechoslovakia, but was banned from publishing. He took the novel with him when he moved to France in 1975. A French edition was published in 1976 and an English version entitled The Farewell Party.

The novel mostly deals with love, hate and accidents between eight characters who are drawn together in a small spa town in Czechoslovakia in early 1970s.

Like most Kundera's work, The Farewell Waltz is a book of many layers. On the surface it is a comedy or a burlesque. Still the comedy is just at the top of this story which involves much darker and ambiguous tones. For the Farewell Waltz, Milan Kundera was awarded the Mondello Prize in 1979.

== Characters ==
=== Růžena ===
Růžena is a young, attractive nurse who has allegedly become pregnant with Klíma.

=== František ===
František is a young fitter who wants to develop a formal romantic relationship with Růžena, thinking he is the father of the child she is carrying. He desperately wants to marry her, despite being aware of her affair with Klíma.

=== Klíma ===
Klíma is a well known trumpeter from a big orchestra, a womanizer who had a one-night stand with Růžena after one of his concerts and was informed by her that he had impregnated her.

=== Kamila ===
Kamila was a popular songstress, although she had to end her career due to health problems. She is Klíma's wife, extremely jealous of her husband and always suspecting him of having affairs.

=== Škréta ===
Škréta is a gynecologist at the spa, whose two major goals are becoming an American citizen (by being adopted by Bertlef) and artificially inseminating apparently infertile women at the spa with his own sperm, implementing a secret, eugenic scheme.

=== Bertlef ===
Bertlef is a rich American with poor health who has to spend most of his time in the spa town. Thanks to Škréta he and his wife were able to have a baby (it is presumed that this was a case of Škréta's sperm treatment).

=== Jakub ===
Jakub is a former political prisoner, who now has received a permission to leave Czechoslovakia. He is paying his last visit to his friend Škréta, who once gave him a pill of poison for committing suicide if he felt that all hope was lost.

=== Olga ===
Jakub's "ward" Olga is the daughter of a man who once betrayed Jakub. She believes (because Jakub has told her so) that her father was Jakub's best friend.

== Plot ==
=== Day 1 ===
The book is split up into five sections, each corresponding to a day. On the first day, Klíma the trumpeter receives a phone call from Růžena who claims that she is pregnant from the time Klíma and his band visited the spa she works at two months prior. Klíma decides to travel to the spa the next day to talk Růžena into having an abortion.

=== Day 2 ===
When he sees her the next day, he meets with Bertlef and Škréta and tells them of his plan, admitting that he wants to have an abortion because he loves his wife, the actress, so much. When he meets with Růžena, he tells her that he loves her and wants to go on a trip with her, but asks that she have an abortion because the love they have together should not be hindered by a child just yet. Růžena, although suspicious seems to agree with this plan before the pair are followed and then harassed by František, a local handyman in love with Růžena. Klima returns to the capital to appease his wife, but she knows that Klima has been unfaithful, and is saddened by his attempts to hide it.

Jakub at the same time is visiting his friend Olga, the daughter of an old political rival who he cared for when her father was killed. He is leaving Czechoslovakia because of the political climate and has visited the spa to say goodbye. He reveals that Dr. Škréta once made a pill for him which would allow him to kill himself if ingested, as a way of being in control of his own fate if captured again.

=== Day 3 ===
Jakub waits to meet Olga the next morning at a Cafe where Klima and Ruzena are speaking. Klima is pleading to Ruzena, but she obstinately walks away, suggesting that she refuses to have an abortion. Jakub notices Ruzena has left a bottle on the table, filled with blue tablets. He's struck to find the tablets are almost identical to the one given to him by the doctor. In comparing them, he accidentally mixes the two up, and Ruzena returns to find him holding the bottle and grabs it from him before walking away. Jakub then wonders why he didn't do more to stop Ruzena, knowing that he was sentencing her to death by not taking the tablets from her. He goes to Skreta to see if he knows where Ruzena went.

Dr. Škréta reveals to Jakub that his procedure for getting his patients pregnant, and why he is so successful, is that he injects his own semen into the mother using a syringe. He offers Jakub an opportunity to donate some of his semen for the doctor's scheme. Later that evening, Jakub is frightened by the number of children in the town who seem to unnaturally resemble Škréta: they all have large noses and some talk in a nasally voice.

That night, Klima has a concert in the Spa: an agreement he had with Skreta so that he could get an abortion. His wife Kalima surprises him, and he's unable to speak with Ruzena for the rest of the night. A distressed Jakub notices Ruzena in the crowd and is relieved to see that she is still alive. He decides that she must have already taken the pill, but that Dr. Skreta had never given him a tablet of poison. Jakub decides that Skreta must have given him a harmless tablet as to appease his pleas, and that Ruzena would be all right after all. Ruzena goes to Bertlef and Bertlef confesses his love for her. The two sleep together and Ruzena is finally happy.

=== Day 4 ===
In the morning, Jakub leaves for the border and a distressed Klíma leaves his wife early on to find Růžena, only to be turned away by her. The two meet again at the abortion hearing, and Růžena agrees to an abortion but hints to Klíma that she might retract her decision at any moment. When she returns to the spa, František runs in yelling and tries to convince Růžena to keep the baby which he is convinced is his. The two argue, and Růžena pulls out the tube containing her medicine and ingests the poison tablet. She is killed instantly.

A hysterical František tries to get the police to arrest him when they arrive, claiming that he drove her to kill herself; however, the police are skeptical of any foul play and refuse. Dr. Škréta tells the investigators that Klíma showed up to the abortion hearing as an agreement. The child wasn't actually his, but he agreed to act as if it were in front of the committee so that they would approve of the abortion due to the marital complications a child might have on Klíma. Bertlef is horrified to hear of Ruzena's death, doesn't believe that she killed herself, claiming that she was happy the night before. He tells the investigators that someone must be accused because he believes suicide is the most despicable crime one can do. Without any other leads on who might have wanted Ruzena dead, the police jokingly accuse him of being the only other person with an agenda: Bertlef wanted to dispose of a nagging and manipulative Ruzena before his actual wife arrived the next day. Bertlef exclaims that he was indeed responsible for the death, but the police indicate that they know he did not kill her.

=== Day 5 ===
The next day, Kamila decides that she will leave Klíma, Jakub sadly reflects on his leaving his home, and Bertlef meets his wife and son at the train station only to notice the unusually large nose of his child.
