= Laughable Loves =

Book by Milan Kundera

- First edition (Czech)
- Author: Milan Kundera
- Original title: Směšné lásky
- Translator: Suzanne Rappaport
- Genre: Short story
- Publisher: Československý spisovatel
- Publication date: 1969
- English publication date: 1974
- Media type: Print (hardback & paperback)

Laughable Loves (Czech: Směšné lásky) is a collection of short stories by Milan Kundera which mix the extremes of tragedy with comic situations in (mostly romantic) relationships. The book was introduced to Western audiences in 1975, when American writer- Philip Roth, chose to include the collection of short stories in his series of writing from Eastern Europe titled "Writers from the Other Europe". Roth characterises the stories as having "a distinctive narrative turn toward erotic play, comic analysis, and extended philosophical speculations."

The collection was first published in Czech in three volumes; the first volume was published in 1963 under the title Směšné lásky : tři melancholické anekdoty (Laughable Loves: Three Melancholy Anecdotes) and contained the stories Já truchlivý bůh (I, Mournful God), Sestřičko mých sestřiček (Nurse of My Nurses) and Nikdo se nebude smát (Nobody Will Laugh). The second volume was published in 1965 under title Druhý sešit směšných lásek (The Second Book of Laughable Loves) and contained the stories Zlaté jablko věčné touhy (The Golden Apple of Eternal Desire), Zvěstovatel (The Herald) and Falešný autostop (The Hitchhiking Game). Third volume was published in 1968 under title Třetí sešit směšných lásek (The Third Book of Laughable Loves) and contained the stories Ať ustoupí staří mrtví mladým mrtvým (Let the Old Dead Make Room for the Young Dead), Symposion (Symposium), Eduard a Bůh (Eduard and God) and Doktor Havel po dvaceti letech (Dr. Havel After Twenty Years).

The collection of short stories was first published in a single volume in Slovak in 1967; the stories Nurse of My Nurses and The Herald were omitted, and the same stories were also omitted from the first collected Czech edition in 1970. The story I, Mournful God was not included in any later edition either — the French edition of 1970, the English edition of 1974, or the Czech exile edition of 1981. The final form of the collection Laughable Loves thus consists of only seven texts.

In the afterword to the first Czech edition after the Velvet Revolution in 1991, Kundera commented on this, stating that he had removed from later editions anything that was immature or juvenile, unsuccessful, or merely occasional.

== Stories ==
"Nobody Will Laugh"
A young professor loves to play mind-games with people he deems inferior. After putting off reviewing the work of an aspiring (and hopeless) scholar, he loses the young woman he was involved with, directly after realizing he loved her.

"The Golden Apple of Eternal Desire"
Two middle-age men flirt with many girls and proposition them. One of the men is married to a woman he loves, and the other would rather read a book.

"The Hitchhiking Game"
A couple plays a role-playing game which initially excites them but then later scares one and repulses the other.

"Symposium"
The first of two stories involving the character Dr. Havel, this is set in the hospital with several other doctors and a nurse. Dr. Havel is known for his multitudes of sexual exploits, and the nurse is interested in him, but he rejects her.

"Let the Old Dead Make Room for the Young Dead"
A woman visits her husband's grave in a cemetery only to find out that it has been removed in the favor of another grave that of a man who had died 'more recently.' This impacts upon her life as a person and is a major factor when she goes to visit a former lover.

"Dr. Havel After Twenty Years"
The second Dr. Havel story takes place ten years after "Symposium," when Dr. Havel feels less powerful and attractive, yet is reminded of his attractiveness by his young, beautiful wife.

"Eduard and God"
A young man called Eduard has a religious girlfriend but he personally has to stay away from religion because of his job in a school. It makes for difficult times for him when he is seen with his girlfriend at a church.
