= Ignorance (novel) =

2000 novel by Milan Kundera

- English edition of Ignorance
- Author: Milan Kundera
- Original title: L'ignorance
- Translator: Linda Asher
- Cover artist: Marie José Paz
- Language: French
- Genre: Novel
- Publisher: Gallimard
- Publication date: 2000
- Publication place: Czech Republic
- English publication date: 2002
- Media type: Print (Hardback and Paperback)
- ISBN: 0-571-21551-3
- OCLC: 52531214

Ignorance (French: L'ignorance) is a novel by Milan Kundera. It was written in 1999 in French and published in 2000. It was translated into English in 2002 by Linda Asher, for which she was awarded the Scott Moncrieff Prize the following year.

== Plot introduction ==
Czech expatriate Irena has been living in France since fleeing Czechoslovakia after the 1968 Warsaw Pact invasion. In 1989, when the Velvet Revolution overthrows the governing Communist Party of Czechoslovakia, Irena decides to return to her home after twenty years of living as an exiled immigrant. During the trip she meets, by chance, Josef, a fellow émigré who was briefly her lover in Prague.

The novel examines the feelings instigated by the return to a homeland which has ceased to be a home. In doing so, it reworks the Odyssean themes of homecoming. It paints a poignant picture of love and its manifestations, a recurring theme in Kundera's novels. The novel explores and centres around the way that people have selective memories as a precursor to ignorance. The concept of ignorance is presented as a two-fold phenomenon; in which ignorance can be a willing action that people participate in, such as avoiding unpleasant conversation topics or acting out. Yet the novel also explores the involuntary aspects of being ignorant, such as feigning ignorance of the past or avoiding the truth.

== Themes ==
Themes of the novel include conceptions of home and homecomings.
