= Charles Nolcini =

Russian-born American organist and composer

Charles Nolcini (1802-1844) was a Russian-born American organist and composer.

== Biography ==
Charles Nolcini was born in Moscow, Russia, to Italian parents in 1802.

On February 20, 1820, he arrived in Boston to pursue a career as a musician and composer. In Boston, Italian composers had already left their mark. Philip Trajetta, before moving to New York, had opened there the first American Conservatory of Music in 1801. Since 1815 conductor Louis Ostinelli had worked there with the Handel and Haydn Society; Nolcini had with him a relationship of close friendship throughout his life.

In the summer of 1822 Nolcini moved to Portland (Maine), where he worked not only as a music teacher but also as a teacher of French, having among his pupils the young Henry Wadsworth Longfellow. On October 29 of the same year Louis Ostinelli visited Portland for a concert with his wife, pianist Sofia Hewitt, and Nolcini as soloists.

Nolcini served as organist of the Beethoven Society (1824–26) and the Second Parish Church (1826–28) in Portland (Maine), and then the King's Chapel in Boston (1828–32), the Unitarian Church in Bangor, Maine (1832–34) and the First Unitarian Church in Newburyport. In addition to his activity as a musician and performer, Nolcini was also known as a composer of waltzes, marches and hymns.

After becoming an American citizen in 1842, Nolcini died prematurely two years later in Boston in 1844 .

== Works of Charles Nolcini ==
=== Operas ===
- The Venetian Maskers.

Waltzers:

- 1. A Military Waltz (1821)
- 2. The Grasshopper's Waltz (1839)
- 3. Les Sans Soucis (1839)
- 4. The Tear of Gratitude Waltz (1840)
- 5. "La Valse de Cupidon"
- 6. Farewell Waltz

Hymns:

- 1. Dedication Anthem (1826)
- 2. Thanksgiving Anthem (1834)
- 3. Funeral Anthem (1839)

Marches:

- 1. A March Dedicated to New Beginners (1826)
- 2. Java March
- 3. Nolcini's March

Other compositions:

- 1. Curtis's Quick Step (1840)
- 2. Bunker Hill Monument (1842)
- 3. My Native Hills

== Notes and references ==
- Vincent A. Lapomarda (2000). “Charles Nolcini.” In The American Italian Experience: An Encyclopedia, ed. Salvatore J. LaGumina (New York: Garland) 406-7.
- Vincent A. Lapomarda (1997). Charles Nolcini: The Life and Music of an Italian American in the Age of Jackson
