= The Art of the Novel =

1986 book by Milan Kundera

- Author: Milan Kundera
- Language: French
- Publisher: Éditions Gallimard
- Publication date: 1986
- Publication place: France
- English publication date: 1988
- Media type: Print (Paperback, Hardback)
- Pages: 165
- ISBN: 0-06-097204-1

The Art of the Novel (French: L'Art du roman) is a 1986 essay about European literature by Milan Kundera, in which the author describes his opinions about the novel and his own experiences with writing novels.

== Origins ==
The essay was not written by Kundera as one text, but rather as various individual texts written in specific circumstances, designed to be published in a single work.

In 1983, Kundera wrote "The Depreciated Legacy of Cervantes," which later became the first part of The Art of the Novel. Later that year, the Paris Review asked Christian Salmon to interview Kundera about his experiences with novel writing. The first part of the dialogue, "Dialogue on the Art of the Novel," became the second part of the essay. The third part of the essay is described as "Notes Inspired by The Sleepwalkers," a series of reflections on The Sleepwalkers (Broch novel). The majority of the remainder of the book is Kundera's personal reflections on literature, both his own and that of Franz Kafka.

== Summary ==
In the first section of The Art of the Novel, Kundera describes his opinion on Edmund Husserl's description of a "crisis of European humanity" and extrapolates his opinion on the topic to European literature of the Modern Era, particularly the novel. Kundera describes the impact of writers such as Cervantes, Descartes, Balzac, James Joyce, and Tolstoy on the evolution of the novel in modern history. Later, Kundera includes a section dedicated to his reflections on The Sleepwalkers, a novel by Hermann Broch that he viewed as especially influential to his own writing. In the sixth part of the essay, Kundera writes a dictionary titled "Sixty-three words" describing sixty-three words that he regularly uses and considers important to his personal experiences in writing novels. The last section of the novel is entitled "Jerusalem Address: The Novel and Europe," and it is primarily the speech he delivered after having received the Jerusalem Prize in 1985.

== Reception ==
Professor Perry Meisel wrote that a "collection of five essays and two dialogues published over the last decade, The Art of the Novel recommends self-effacement as a precept of writing and dooms purveyors of dogma in either literature or criticism."

W. L. Webb for The Guardian complained of Kundera for flourishing his cleverness "like a matador's cape," describing that he "can never read two pages of Milan Kundera without trying to remember who called Matthew Arnold Mr Kidglove Cocksure." Webb further notes that "in spite of the showing off, Kundera is usually pointing to something interesting."

Ian Watt for the Los Angeles Times wrote "the mind behind the novels is essentially serious, and yet they are very funny, sometimes farcical. Our puzzlement is not wholly laid to rest in Kundera’s new book, 'The Art of the Novel.'” Watt compares The Art of the Novel to previous works by Kundera and the questions that he perceives them to leave unanswered, in particular the contrast between the serious nature of Kundera and the very funny nature of his writing.

== See also ==
- The Art of the Novel: Critical Prefaces, anthology of essays by Henry James
