= The Unbearable Lightness of Being (film) =

1988 American drama film

- Theatrical release poster
- Directed by: Philip Kaufman
- Screenplay by: Jean-Claude Carrière; Philip Kaufman
- Based on: The Unbearable Lightness of Being by Milan Kundera
- Produced by: Bertil Ohlsson; Paul Zaentz; Saul Zaentz
- Starring: Daniel Day-Lewis; Juliette Binoche; Lena Olin; Derek de Lint; Erland Josephson; Pavel Landovský; Donald Moffat; Daniel Olbrychski; Stellan Skarsgård
- Cinematography: Sven Nykvist
- Edited by: Walter Murch
- Music by: Mark Adler
- Production company: The Saul Zaentz Company
- Distributed by: Orion Pictures
- Release date: February 5, 1988
- Running time: 171 minutes
- Country: United States
- Language: English
- Budget: $17 million
- Box office: $10 million

The Unbearable Lightness of Being is a 1988 American romantic drama film, an adaptation of the 1984 novel by Milan Kundera. It was directed by Philip Kaufman, who co-wrote the screenplay with Jean-Claude Carrière, and stars Daniel Day-Lewis, Juliette Binoche and Lena Olin. The film portrays Czechoslovak artistic and intellectual life during the Prague Spring, and the characters' romantic lives amid the Soviet repression that resulted from the Warsaw Pact invasion of Czechoslovakia in 1968.

== Plot ==
Tomas, a successful brain surgeon in communist Czechoslovakia, is pursuing an affair with equally carefree Sabina, an artist in Prague. Tomas takes a trip to a spa town to conduct a specialized surgery. There he encounters dissatisfied waitress Tereza, who desires intellectual stimulation. She later tracks him down in Prague and moves in with him, complicating Tomas's affairs.

Tomas asks Sabina to help Tereza find work as a photographer. Tereza is both fascinated and jealous when she grasps that Sabina and Tomas are lovers, but nevertheless still develops an affectionate friendship with Sabina. Tomas marries Tereza in a simple ceremony, with both perpetually laughing. She continues to be distressed by Tomas's promiscuity, and though she considers leaving him, she becomes more attached when the Soviet Army invades Czechoslovakia. Amid the confusion, Tereza photographs demonstrations against the Soviet forces, then hands the rolls of film to foreigners to smuggle to the West. Unwilling to face the stultifying police state that is replacing the Prague Spring, Tomas, Sabina, and Tereza flee Czechoslovakia for Switzerland; Sabina leaves first, later followed by the hesitant Tomas and Tereza.

In Geneva, Sabina meets Franz, a married university professor; they begin a love affair. He eventually decides to abandon his wife and family for her. After hearing his plans, Sabina abandons him, feeling he would emotionally weigh her down. Meanwhile, Tereza and Tomas attempt to adapt to Switzerland, but Tereza finds the Swiss inhospitable. When she discovers that Tomas continues to womanize, she leaves him and returns to Czechoslovakia. Upset by her leaving, Tomas follows Tereza to Czechoslovakia, where his passport is confiscated, preventing him from leaving again; his return elates Tereza, and they are reunited.

Tomas attempts to resume his practice, but a scathing article he wrote before the invasion, criticizing the Soviet-backed Czechoslovak régime, has rendered him a political dissident. The régime demands his signature to a letter repudiating the article, claiming that Tomas's article fueled anti-communist sentiment. Tomas refuses and is apparently blacklisted from practicing medicine. He finds work as a window washer and continues to womanize, being seduced by the daughter of a high-ranking Party official who appears to recognize him.

As a waitress, Tereza meets an engineer who propositions her. Aware of Tomas's infidelities, she engages in a single, passionless sexual liaison with the engineer. Remorseful, she fears the engineer might have been an informant for the StB secret police, who might denounce her and Tomas. She contemplates suicide at a canal bank; by chance, Tomas passes by Tereza and woos her back.

Stressed by city life, Tereza urges Tomas to leave Prague. He reminds her of his passport being confiscated. Tereza has an idea and convinces Tomas to move to the countryside; they go to a village where an old patient of Tomas's welcomes them. In the village, they live an idyllic life, far from the political intrigues of Prague. In contrast, Sabina has gone to the US, where she continues her debauched bohemian lifestyle. Later, Sabina is shocked by a letter that informs her that Tereza and Tomas have been killed in an automobile accident on a country road.

The movie ends with Tomas and Tereza seen just before the accident, driving down a country road in the rain in a farm truck as Tomas peacefully expresses to Tereza how happy and relieved he finally feels.

== Cast ==
- Daniel Day-Lewis as Tomas
- Juliette Binoche as Tereza
- Lena Olin as Sabina
- Derek de Lint as Franz
- Erland Josephson as Ambassador
- Pavel Landovský as Pavel
- Donald Moffat as Chief Surgeon
- Tomek Bork as Jiri
- Daniel Olbrychski as Interior Ministry Official
- Stellan Skarsgård as The Engineer
- Anne Lonnberg as Swiss Photographer
- Leon Lissek as Bald Man in Bar
- Consuelo de Haviland as Tall Brunette

== Production ==
The film was an American production with an American director, Philip Kaufman, but it features a largely European cast. It was filmed in France; in the scenes depicting the Soviet invasion, archival footage is combined with new material shot in Lyon. The scene in which Tomas has sex with a woman while cleaning windows was shot in the then unrestored Hôtel de Beauvais in the 4th arrondissement of Paris (now the Administrative Appeal Court).

Filming also took place at the thermal baths in Luxeuil-les-Bains, in the Haute-Saône department. Interior scenes were shot at Boulogne Studios near Paris.

=== Writing and adaptation ===
Kundera served as an active consultant during the making of the film. Kundera wrote the poem that Tomas whispers into Tereza's ear as she is falling asleep specifically for the film.

In a note to the Czech edition of the book, Kundera remarks that the movie had very little to do with the spirit either of the novel or the characters in it. In the same note Kundera goes on to say that after this experience he no longer allows any adaptations of his work.

Many critics have focused on how much of the book was successfully captured, or could be captured, on film. Some commentators, such as Cattrysse Patrick, have argued that the film must be viewed in a different light, with the book as only one source of inspiration.

=== Soundtrack ===
The film makes extensive use of classical pieces by Czech composer Leoš Janáček, especially his "On an Overgrown Path" piano compositions. It also features a performance of the Beatles' song "Hey Jude" by Marta Kubišová in Czech as well as the traditional Czechoslovak folk song "Joj, Joj, Joj", performed by Jarmila Šuláková and Vojtěch Jochec.

== Reception and legacy ==
=== Critical response ===
The film holds an approval rating of 86% on the review aggregator website Rotten Tomatoes, based on 29 reviews. The website's consensus reads, "Exploring sexual mores against the backdrop of real-life social upheaval, The Unbearable Lightness of Being artfully blends the political and the erotic." Metacritic, which uses a weighted average, assigned the film a score of 73 out of 100, based on 17 critics, indicating "generally favorable" reviews.

=== Accolades ===
The film was nominated for two Academy Awards: Jean-Claude Carrière and Philip Kaufman for Best Adapted Screenplay and Sven Nykvist for Best Cinematography. The film was listed 87th by the American Film Institute in its 2002 list AFI's 100 Years...100 Passions.

=== Home media ===
It was released on VHS and Betamax on December 29, 1988. A digitally restored version of the film was released on DVD by The Criterion Collection in November 1999. The release includes audio commentary by director Philip Kaufman, co-writer Jean-Claude Carrière, editor Walter Murch, and actress Lena Olin. It was re-released on DVD by Warner Home Video as a 2-disc special edition on February 28, 2006.

=== Preservation ===
The Unbearable Lightness of Being was preserved by the Academy Film Archive in 2019.

== See also ==
- List of 1980s films based on actual events
