= Linda Asher =

American translator, editor (died 2026)

Linda Asher (died September 15, 2026) was an American translator and editor. She was a fiction editor at The New Yorker. Over the course of her career, she translated works by numerous authors including Victor Hugo, Milan Kundera, Georges Simenon, Jean-Pierre Vernant, and Restif de la Bretonne.
