= The Questionnaire (Gruša novel) =

Novel by Jiří Gruša

- 1978 edition
- Author: Jiří Gruša
- Original title: Dotazník
- Translator: Peter Kussi
- Genre: Novel
- Published: 1978 Sixty-Eight Publishers; 1982 Farrar, Straus and Giroux
- Publication place: Czech Republic
- Media type: Print (Hardback & Paperback)
- Pages: 278 pp

The Questionnaire is the second novel of Czech writer and politician Jiří Gruša. When it was originally written in 1974, and a limited number of samizdat copies were distributed. It was formally published in 1978. The English translation followed in 1982. Shortly after its limited release, typed by hand, Gruša was imprisoned on the charge of 'initiating disorder'. Following widespread protest and media attention, Gruša was released after serving two months in prison. It is Gruša's most well-known and most widely translated novel.

== Plot summary ==
Jan Chrysostom Kepka is asked to complete a questionnaire for a job application, required by the faceless bureaucrat Comrade Pavlenda. As an answer, Jan gives full and surreal account of his life and times.
