= Identity (novel) =

1998 novel by Milan Kundera

- First US edition
- Author: Milan Kundera
- Original title: L'Identité
- Translator: Linda Asher
- Publisher: HarperCollins (US); Faber & Faber (UK)
- Publication date: 1998
- ISBN: 0-06-017564-8

Identity (French: L'Identité) is a novel by Franco-Czech writer Milan Kundera, published in 1998. Kundera moved to France in 1975. Identity is set primarily in France and was his second novel to be written in French with his earlier novels all in Czech. The novel revolves around the intimate relationship between Chantal and her marginally younger partner Jean-Marc. The intricacies of their relationship and its influences on their sense of identity brings out Kundera's philosophical musings on identity not as an autonomous entity but something integral shaped by the identities of others and their relations to your own.

== Plot summary ==
The novel follows an intimate relationship between a woman Chantal and Jean-Marc, alternating perspectives with each chapter. It begins with Chantal at a hotel on the coast of Normandy awaiting the arrival the next day of her partner. When he arrives they struggle to find each other, misattributing their loved one's identity to stranger on the beach who upon closer examination bears little resemblance. Upon their meeting, Chantal is upset by her disturbing slightly sexual dream as well as the way a man looked at her in a cafe.

She also has many musings about fathers and observes children on the beach. This is a reoccurring theme within the novel and references her anxieties about the death of her child with a previous partner. She feels this period of her life was her prime, allowing a sense of unease and decline to shape her sense of self throughout the novel.

Jean-Marc asks why she is upset and she responds that "men don't turn to look at me anymore." This remark serves as the crucial instant of the novel. It reveals a self identity of Chantal that alienates Jean-Marc's perception of his lover and thus himself.

Chantal later begins receiving love letters that are a rude intrusion into her relationship and force her to think of how she appears to others. It creates in her a changed behaviour motivated by a feeling that someone is constantly observing her. She hides the letters in her underwear draw and does not tell Jean-Marc.

As the letters continue and the couple show close intimacy but also a weary underlying anxiety about the other's identity, Chantal's acute observations of a moved shawl in her bedroom and specific details from the letters lead her to the conclusion that Jean-Marc is the secret correspondent.

From Jean-Marc's perspective, he reveals in third person narration that his first letter sought only to relieve Chantal of the feeling that men no longer turned to look at her. Yet her refusal to tell him about the letters and her changed behaviour and more sensual dressing saw Jean-Marc become jealous. She acts differently and he perceives her as a different person in a range of contexts, this multiplicity of perceived identities challenges Jean-Marc's singular perception of his lover's identity. He feels he has transformed "a beloved woman into the simulacrum of a beloved woman." This challenges his own sense of identity turning him into a simulacrum as well.

After confirming with a graphologist that the letters were written by Jean-Marc in a different style, she confronts him when he was just about to admit the ruse. An implication of this confrontation is that Jean-Marc, who lives in Chantal's apartment, feels closer to his fears of becoming a beggar.

The final part of the novel reveals that each character's disorientation regarding their sense of identity is caused by confusion about the identity of the other.

== Major themes ==
=== Identity ===
The nature and susceptibility to change of personal identity is the primary philosophical question of the novel. Kundera asks whether one's identity over time is hinged on those around them. He looks at the diachronic question of self in philosophy, which asks what makes your identity something continuous over time. His use of the relationship between Chantal and Jean-Marc to rupture their identity shows a challenge to an answer to the diachronic question which is that being perceived by others as the same person influences identity over time.

=== Crowds ===
The theme of crowds in the novel is used to create a conflict between the influences of the masses on one's identity and the influence of your own and those close to you. Chantal's desire to have mass appeal is represented by the imaginary crowd that desires easy aesthetic appeal (kitsch), her desire to be accepted in this way overshadows her care for her real relationship with Jean-Marc, leaving her with no real sense of self or meaningful relationships. The emphasis she places on how men see her physical appearance in passing overshadows Jean-Marc's love for her as a person not a superficial entity. In this way, Chantal's preoccupation with crowds and strangers leads her to place her identity in the hands of an anonymous crowd that desires kitsch aesthetic appeal, leaving her without a true sense of self. In the final chapters, Jean-Marc loses sight of Chantal in a crowded subway, this literally and figuratively shows how Chantal has lost herself in a crowd of strangers.

=== Vision and perception ===
Visual perception of someone at any one moment is taken as the defining sign of their identity within this novel. This creates a precarious and ephemeral sense of identity that gives the impression of shifting with the light.

== Critical reception ==
Due to the relative obscurity of this novel in Kundera's oeuvre, the critical receptions are limited to reviews at the time of the publication, 1998. The general response to the novel seeks to compare it to Kundera's more famous novels, specifically The Unbearable Lightness of Being and The Book of Laughter and Forgetting. Due to Identity's very different stylistic choices and linear narrative, the book is very different to these earlier successes, challenging what readers expected from a Kundera novel. Newspaper reviewers with a general or non academic audience referenced the book's lack of character development and minimal characters and plot overall. Reviewers from the New York Times and The Guardian looked more favourably at the simple narrative and complex philosophical questions, these reviewers also looked at the narrative form as an intentional way of reflecting the confusion of the plot.
