= Czechoslovak passport =

Passport of Czechoslovakia issued to Czechoslovak citizens

- Front cover of a Czechoslovak passport issued in 1980

- Picture page of a Czechoslovak passport issued in 1980
- Type: Passport
- Issued by: Czechoslovakia
- Purpose: Identification
- Eligibility: Czechoslovak citizenship

The Czechoslovak passport was issued to citizens of Czechoslovakia for international travel. After Czechoslovakia split into the Czech Republic and Slovakia, the two countries started issuing their own passports.

== History ==
Czechoslovak passport holders were required to obtain an exit visa starting 23 February 1948. In the summer of 1948, the directive was temporarily suspended;

In autumn 1951, however, the government mandated that all passports be confiscated, necessitating them to be sent to the Ministry for State Security in Prague. This move left thousands of Czechoslovaks around the world effectively stateless as their documents were confiscated by their local embassy/consulate-general. Thereon, passports were only issued to people who the Communist government saw fit to possess one. The Czechoslovak ambassador in the Soviet Union, Bohuslav Laštovička, protested the sudden change in policy.

Travelling outside of the Eastern Bloc became a near-impossibility as Czechoslovak identity cards were only valid for travel inside the Iron Curtain and obtaining a passport through legitimate means was practically impossible. In 1963, however, Czechoslovak citizens were given authorization to visit relatives in the West, and subsequently, the 1965 Act No. 63 on Passports made for a more liberal passport issuance regime.

== See also ==
- Czech passport
- Slovak passport
