= Mondello Prize =

Italian literary award

The Mondello Prize (Italian: Premio Mondello or Premio letterario internazionale Mondello Città di Palermo) is an Italian literary award established in 1975.

== History ==
The award was founded by a group of Palermo intellectuals and academics, and was first directed by the magistrate Francesco Lentini until his death in 2000. Since it is organized by a cultural foundation, Fondazione Sicilia.

Since 2012 the award has a partnership with the Turin International Book Fair. The same year it established an award for young writers, the Mondello Giovani Award.

Winners include Milan Kundera in 1979, and Cees Nooteboom in 2017.
