= The Festival of Insignificance =

2014 novel by Milan Kundera

- English edition of The Festival of Insignificance
- Author: Milan Kundera
- Original title: La fête de l'insignifiance
- Translator: Linda Asher
- Language: French
- Genre: Novel
- Publisher: Gallimard
- Publication date: 3 April 2014
- Publication place: Paris
- English publication date: 2015
- Media type: Print (paperback)
- Pages: 144 pp.
- ISBN: 9782070145645

The Festival of Insignificance (French: La fête de l'insignifiance) is a novel by Milan Kundera. This is his eleventh and final fictional work before his death in 2023. It is about a man named Alain, who has not seen his mother since his childhood; Ramon, an intellectual who has retired; D'Ardelo, a man who has a narcissistic personality; Charles and "Caliban" are two people who operate a catering firm; and Quaquelique is an old man who remains attracted to women. Quaquelique manages to seduce women using his skill at non-stop talking. The novel is set in Paris. The themes include "the erotic potential; the link between mother and child; the procreative role of sex; angels...[,] navel gazing...and insignificance. The novels' characters discuss the philosophical ideas of Hegel, Kant and Schopenhauer. The novel is made up of seven parts (an approach he also used in his novel The Unbearable Lightness of Being, among others, and representative of a structure he laid out in his book The Art of the Novel). The theme of insignificance was also used in The Unbearable Lightness of Being.

== Reception ==
The Guardian stated that "...there's something very appealing in the flavour and personality of this new short novel..." The Guardian states that while "[p]erhaps the textures of the novel are thin, and perhaps it does seem to circle around some missing centre – of drive, or story. But then again, that's part of the point: everything ends in Ramon's hymn to insignificance, celebrating the life that doesn't signify anything, the world that is just itself "in all its obviousness, all its innocence, in all its beauty". And indeed this austere prose – with its elusive ironies, and aura of the 18th century – works beautifully, just as itself, in Linda Asher's translation from the French."

== Plot ==
Alain is strolling down a Paris street, examining women and he comes up with an explanation for their thighs, buttocks, and breasts, he fails to grasp the mystery behind the seductive power of their navel.

Around the same time, Alain's recently retired friend, Ramon, is in the Luxembourg Gardens admiring the sculptures. Ramon runs into his wealthy friend, D'Ardelo, and they gossip about Madame Franck. They both admire her courage in the face of her husband's death. Ramon invites D'Ardelo to his birthday party; D'Ardelo confesses that he has untreatable cancer and will soon die, though none of this is true. Ramon believes the lie, and D'Ardelo is pleased that he was so convincing. After parting Ramon visits his friend Charles to discuss a cocktail party they are planning. However, they become distracted gossiping about Quaquelique, a friend of theirs whom they find banal and unfunny to be around. Ramon mentions that Quaquelique has more success with women than D'Ardelo. Charles explains that Quaquelique's personality is more agreeable than D'Ardelo's. They both agree that D'Ardelo is a narcissist but still feel sorry for him because of his non-existent disease.

Caliban, an out of work actor, joins Ramon and Charles. They talk about a story Charles recently read in the book Memoirs of Nikita Khrushchev. Caliban laughs off the story about Stalin, but Charles makes the point that people under Stalin wouldn't have found it very funny. However, they agree that the story must have been intended as a joke and the only reason it was misunderstood was that no one knew what a joke was anymore.

Meanwhile, Alain continues to think about women's bodies, specifically the navel. He recalls an event from his childhood in which he thought he noticed his mother staring at his navel with contempt and pity. His mother abandoned him shortly after that. Alain tells Charles about this, and Charles confesses that he has been thinking about his mother recently as well. Before they can continue, however, they have to get ready for a party.

Caliban is working at the party as a waiter. While working at such events, he often pretends to be Pakistani, speaking in a made-up language. He and Charles see this as a joke, but how it is meant to be funny remains unclear. Ramon attempts to speak to Caliban in French, but Caliban warns him not to spoil the joke. Ramon is afraid that Caliban's joke might land him in jail and laments society's lack of humor. Caliban makes it through the party undiscovered and goes to Alain's for a drink.

The next morning, Alain senses the presence of his mother. He imagines his mother apologizing to him for bringing him into the world without his consent, while Alain apologizes for coming into his mother's life without being asked.

He meets Ramon and D'Ardelo in the Luxembourg Gardens, and they stroll among the statues. Children are busy setting up the park for a concert. Ramon, who still believes that D'Ardelo is soon to die, tells him that it is important to maintain a good sense of humor and a positive mood, including joking and pranking. The men feel light-hearted and happy as the children in the park begin to sing "La Marseilles."

== See also ==
- Insignificance
