= Nguyễn Quang Lập =

Vietnamese writer

- Born: April 30, 1956 (age 70)
- Occupations: Writer; playwright; screenwriter
- Writing career
- Language: Vietnamese
- Website: bolapquechoa.com

Nguyễn Quang Lập is a Vietnamese writer, playwright, and screenwriter. He has won several prizes of the Vietnamese government. His political publications led to his arrest in 2014. Out of Vietnam's 34 imprisoned bloggers counted by Reporters Without Borders, he is the only mainstream author, often featured by Vietnam's official media.

== Biography ==
Nguyễn Quang Lập was born in 1956 in Quang Trach. He graduated from the University of Hanoi as a radio engineer.

Nguyễn Quang Lập joined the army from 1980 to 1985, stationed in Quang Ninh then in Da Nang. Some of his early works were written during this period. After leaving the army he worked at Kim Dong Publishing House and for the Saigon Tiep Thi newspaper.

He was arrested on December 6, 2014 under article 258 of the Vietnamese Penal Code, which allows for prison terms of up to 3 years for "abus[ing] the rights to freedom of speech, freedom of press, freedom of belief, religion, assembly, association, and other democratic freedoms to infringe upon the interests of the State."

== Works ==
- The Deserted Valley, 2002
- The Little Heart, 2008

== See also ==
- Human rights in Vietnam
- Nguyễn Văn Hải
- Le Quoc Quan
