= The Book of Laughter and Forgetting =

Book by Milan Kundera

- First English edition (publ. Knopf)
- Author: Milan Kundera
- Original title: Kniha smíchu a zapomnění
- Translator: Michael Henry Heim
- Language: Czech
- Publication date: 1979
- Publication place: France
- English publication date: 1980
- Pages: 320

The Book of Laughter and Forgetting (Czech: Kniha smíchu a zapomnění) is a novel by Milan Kundera, published in France in 1979. It is composed of seven separate narratives united by some common themes. The book considers the nature of forgetting as it occurs in history, politics, and life in general. The stories also contain elements found in the genre of magic realism.

== Publication history ==
The original title is Kniha smíchu a zapomnění. It was finished in 1978 and was then published in France under the title Le Livre du rire et de l'oubli in 1979. The English translation was first published in the United States by Alfred A. Knopf in 1980, and it is credited to Michael Henry Heim. Several sections of the book were printed in The New Yorker. The book was published in Czech by the exile publishing house 68 Publishers Toronto in April 1981.

== Plot summary ==
=== Part One: Lost Letters ===
The first section occurs in 1971 and is the story of Mirek, as he explores his memories of Zdena. Knowing that he loved this ugly woman has left a blemish, and he hopes to rectify this by destroying the love letters that he had sent her. While he travels to her home and back, he is followed by two men. Mirek is arrested at his home and sentenced to jail for six years, his son to two years, and ten or so of his friends to terms of from one to six years.

Kundera also describes a photograph from 21 February 1948, where Vladimír Clementis stands next to Klement Gottwald. When Vladimír Clementis was charged in 1950, he was erased from the photograph (along with the photographer Karel Hájek) by the state propaganda. This short example from Czechoslovak history underlines the motif of forgetting in his book.

=== Part Two: Mama ===
Marketa invites her mother-in-law to visit her and Karel's home after her mother could not stop complaining. Inviting her to stay for a week – although contending that she must leave Saturday because they had somewhere to be on Sunday – the mother forces her way to stay until Monday. On Sunday morning, Eva – a friend of Karel and Marketa – arrives and is introduced to the mother as Marketa's cousin. Through narration the reader is told that Eva had met and had sex with Karel, who then arranged for Eva and Marketa to meet. Through Marketa's suggestion, the three have conducted a sexual relationship over the years. Mother almost catches the three in the act, but instead realizes that Eva reminds her of a friend of hers from Karel's infancy. This makes Karel even more attracted to Eva, and after the mother leaves, they continue with renewed vigour.

=== Part Three: The Angels ===
This section concerns events after the Russians occupied Czechoslovakia in 1968, especially Kundera's attempts to write a horoscope under an associate's name. His boss – who has studied Marxism–Leninism for half of his life – requests a private horoscope, which Kundera extends to ten pages, providing a template for the man to change his life. Eventually, Kundera's associate – code named R. – is brought in for questioning concerning Kundera's clandestine writing, changing the mood from amusement to concern. Kundera also describes 'circle dancing' wherein the joy and laughter build up to the point that the people's steps take them soaring into the sky with the laughing angels.

=== Part Four: Lost Letters ===
Tamina, a woman who works in a cafe, wants to retrieve her love letters and diaries in Prague through her customer who will be going to Prague, Bibi. Also, another customer, Hugo, who lusts for Tamina, offers to help her if Bibi cannot go to Prague. One day, Hugo invites Tamina to dinner and they visited the zoo together. A group of ostriches move their mute mouths vigorously to Hugo and Tamina as if to warn them of something, which gives Tamina a bad feeling about the letters and diaries in Prague. As these items, which Tamina describes as packed in a parcel, are in her mother-in-law's, she phoned her father to take it from her mother-in-law, so it will be easier for Bibi to get them. After a lot of pleas, her father agreed to send Tamina's brother to take them. It turns out that the items are not packed in a parcel, and Tamina fears that her private letters and diaries are read by others. The situation turns worse as Bibi gets fed up with her husband and refuses to go anywhere with him, which means the trip to Prague is cancelled. Hugo offers to help and once again invites Tamina to his house. Hugo tries desperately to win her heart. Tamina later has sex with Hugo, but cannot keep her mind off her deceased husband. Hugo senses her uneasiness but he still finishes the act. Again, Hugo chats with Tamina and tries saying things that please her. However, Tamina is not interested in his talk but only in Hugo's trip to Prague. Hugo gradually knows that and his speech gets weaker and he starts to get angry. Tamina is increasingly disgusted by his talk and eventually vomits in the toilet. Hugo knows that she has absolutely no interest in him and refuses to help her. In the end, the letters and diaries remain in Prague.

=== Part Five: Litost ===
It starts with introducing Kristyna, who develops a romantic relationship with a student studying philosophy and poetry. Then, it explains the Czech word litost, which the author says cannot be accurately translated into any other language. Litost is, according to Kundera, "a state of torment created by the sudden sight of one's own misery." Litost seems to be always present in the student whom Kristyna loves, and this feeling is also one of the reasons that he broke up with his former girlfriend.

His professor, nicknamed Voltaire, invites the student to an evening gathering of the great poets of the country. However, the student has a date with Kristyna that night and refuses to go to the gathering. He then meets Kristyna on the day the gathering is held. He is surprised to find her tacky, gaudy and simplistic in the city setting and decides to go to the meeting. He tells her about it and she is fascinated by it and wants the student to go there so as not to miss the chance. The student agrees and goes to the meeting. He meets the great poets and listens to their arguments and insults to each other. Through this he learns a lot of things. He asks one of the poets, named Goethe by the author, to inscribe one of his books and then gives the book to Kristyna as a gift. He returns to his home and finds Kristyna waiting for him. She is moved by the inscription. They do not have sex but feels each other's immense love. The student tries several times to get Kristyna to separate her two legs, but Kristyna fears that this will make her pregnant, which threatens her life. So she keeps saying that by doing this she will die. The student misinterprets that she will die from the immense love from him if they are separated from each other for a long time. He is deeply moved. He soon falls asleep and wakes up next morning, finding a note in his coat from Kristyna. After thinking over their night, he realizes that he misinterpreted her statement last night. He feels Litost but cannot take revenge for Kristyna has already left.

One of the poets approaches him and fills him with glory, relieving the student's despair.

=== Part Six: The Angels ===
Returning to Tamina, the author parallels her struggles with the death of his father. She travels on a mysterious boat ride to an island where she is stranded with many children. The children taunt her and she does not mind, but eventually she tries to escape and drowns.

=== Part Seven: The Border ===
Describing an orgy scene, the author targets the progressivism of the Clevis family.

== See also ==
- Politics of memory
- Social amnesia
- Damnatio memoriae
