= Slowness (novel) =

1995 novel by Milan Kundera

- First English edition
- Author: Milan Kundera
- Language: French
- Publisher: Harper Perennial
- Publication date: 1996 (1995 in French)
- Publication place: France
- Media type: Print (Hardback & Paperback)
- Pages: 192 pp
- ISBN: 0-06-092841-7 (paperback)
- OCLC: 36959797

Slowness (French: La Lenteur) is a novel by Czech writer Milan Kundera published in 1995 in France, where the author had been living since the 1970s. In his first fictional work written in French, Kundera weaves together a number of plot lines, characters and themes in just over 150 pages. While the book has a narrative, it mainly serves as a way for Kundera to expound his philosophical ideas about modernity, technology, memory and sensuality.

== Plot summary ==
The novel is a meditation on the effects of modernity upon the individual's perception of the world. It is told through a number of plot lines that slowly weave together until they are all united at the end of the book.

- Kundera, as narrator, visits a chateau on vacation and tells a story that seems to be a combination of fiction and fact.
- A chevalier from eighteenth-century France visits the chateau and experiences a night of carefully orchestrated sensual pleasure with its owner, Madame de T.
- Vincent, Kundera's friend, visits the hotel and pursues a romance with a girl met in a bar.
- Berck, a "dancer", meets a woman who once scorned him at the same conference and shows his emptiness to her.
- Immaculata, the woman who scorned Berck, must deal with her disappointment at learning Berck's apparent perfection is actually a facade.

Each plot shows a different point-of-view into Kundera's concept of the dancer and provides a perspective on modernity, memory and sensuality. By the end of the book, all of these plots have been brought together in a single location and the characters interact, showing how the ideals they represent interact in the world.

Kundera even manages to tie the modern to the past by having Vincent meet the Chevalier as they both depart. By having these characters meet, Kundera again illustrates how the idea of sensuality and pleasure have changed as technology provides humanity with tools that speed us to our destination and demand our attention.

== Characters in the novel ==
For a 150-page novel, there are a large number of characters in this book. Many have heavy symbolic qualities and their interactions appear to be a way in which Kundera is illustrating the philosophy he directly describes in the dialog of the story.

Milan
The narrator who tells the story. His interaction with the story is both as creator and a participant. Strangely, the story overflows into his own life.

Věra
Milan's wife who has accompanied him on the trip to the chateau. She is repeatedly disturbed by Milan's thoughts as he tells the story. She also makes several observations and prophetic statements.

Chevalier
An unknown chevalier from eighteenth century France. The Chevalier is seduced by Madame de T and later becomes a way for the narrator to illustrate an unhurried and sensual lifestyle.

Madame de T
Seduces the Chevalier. Is described as a “Loveable lover of pleasure. Gentle protective liar. Guardian of happiness.” Embodies these qualities as she slowly guides the Chevalier through a night of sensual pleasure that misdirects her husband from her real lover, the Marquis.

Vincent
A friend of Milan who travels to the chateau for a conference. Hates the concept of "the dancer" but transforms into one as the night progresses. Is a modern man who speeds from place to place and gets so caught up in the idea of passion that his pursuit of it prevents him from enjoying it.

Berck
The archetypical "dancer" of the novel. Embodies the problems that modern technology creates, especially for those who seek fame.

Immaculata
A woman from Berck's past who is drawn to the image he portrays on television. She is crushed when she realizes Berck's insincerity. Has a complex and symbolic relationship with the cameraman.

The cameraman
Immaculata's lover. His relationship with her is complex. He observes everything Immaculata does and influences her actions, but in the end is under her control. Despite having a substantial presence in the story, the cameraman is unnamed.

Cechoripsky (Čechořípský)
A former scientist who was punished for opposing Soviet invasion to Czechoslovakia in the late 1960s. He has come to believe he is among the "elect" even though he played his role in the event only out of cowardice. His encounter with Berck illustrates an encounter between one of the "elect" and a dancer.

== Major themes ==
=== Slowness ===
There is no single central theme in the book, although the title suggests that the speed of modern living is the key concept that is the root cause of the events of the book. Several events in the book are tied to the speed of movement, such as speeding cars or slow walks through a garden.

Kundera ties slowness to the act of remembering, and speed to the act of forgetting. When one wants to savour, remember, or prolong a moment, one moves and acts slowly. On the other hand, one travels fast in order to forget a past experience. For example, after Vincent's disastrous night at the chateau, he gets on his motorcycle and drives home as fast as he can in order to leave behind the site of his failed romantic endeavor.

There is also the suggestion that speed creates vulgarity, as suggested by the parallel seductions held at the chateau. Vincent's seduction of Julie is misguided and ultimately fails. Madame de T's seduction of the Chevalier is deliberate and provides them with a night of pleasure.

Speed and failure are also associated as Vera comments that slowness has protected Milan in the past. This suggests that serious consideration requires slowness; speed encourages rash decisions and ultimately failure.

=== Modernity and the Dancer ===
Kundera introduces the concept of the dancer early in the book. The dancer, defined in the story, is a person who constantly seeks the infinite and invisible audience that modern media offers. The fame that a successful dancer gathers has a dramatic effect on the life of the dancer and upon people who seek out the dancer (those who consider themselves "elect").

The entire storyline of Berck and Immaculata seems to represent this theme both in the literal story that is told as well as through the symbolism of their names and actions. For example, Immaculata, a "night bird" who troubles Berck's sleep before his rise to fame, becomes Berck's nightmare at the conference.
