= Milan Kundera =

Czech and French novelist (1929–2023)

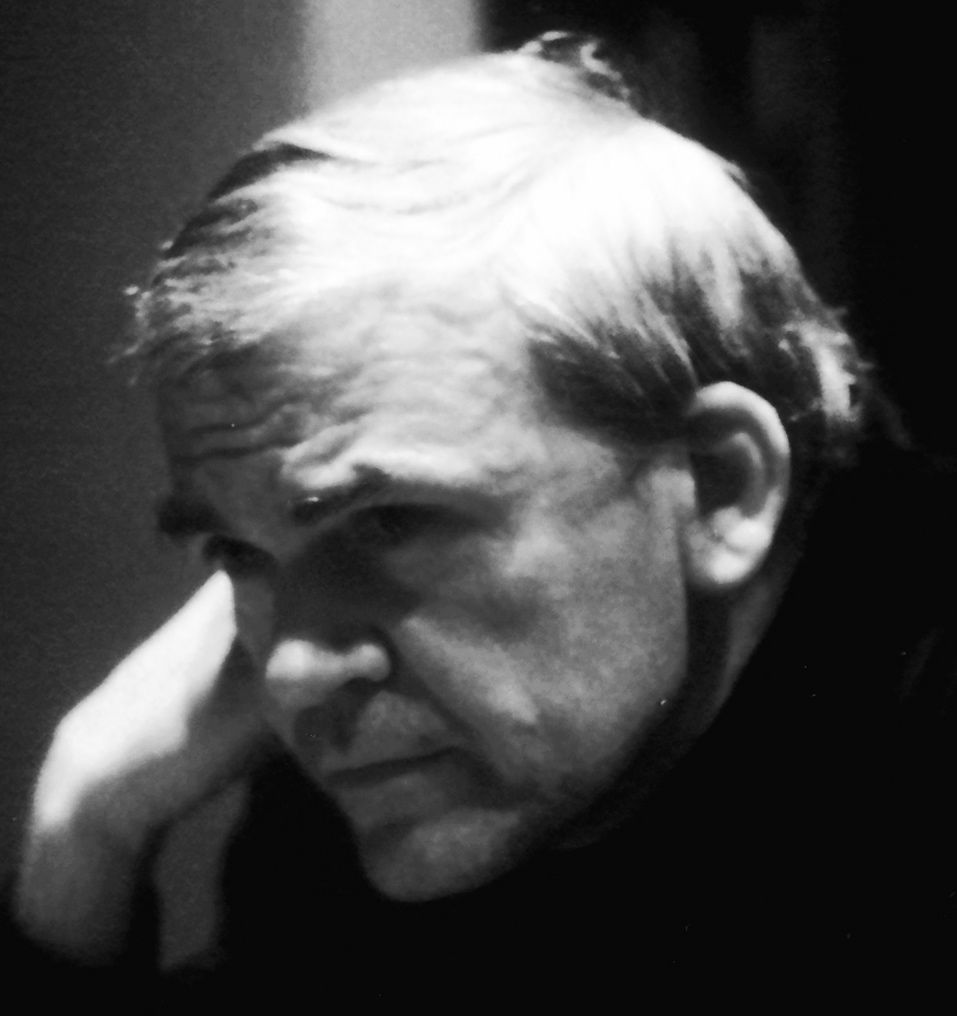
- Kundera in 1980
- Born: 1 April 1929; Brno, Czechoslovakia
- Died: 11 July 2023 (aged 94); Paris, France
- Citizenship: Czechoslovakia (until 1979); Stateless (1979–1981); France (from 1981); Czech Republic (from 2019)
- Education: Charles University; Academy of Performing Arts in Prague
- Occupation: Novelist
- Spouses: Olga Haasová-Smrčková (m. 1956, divorced); Věra Hrabánková (m. 1967)
- Parent: Ludvík Kundera (father)
- Relatives: Ludvík Kundera (cousin)
- Writing career
- Language: French; Czech

Signature
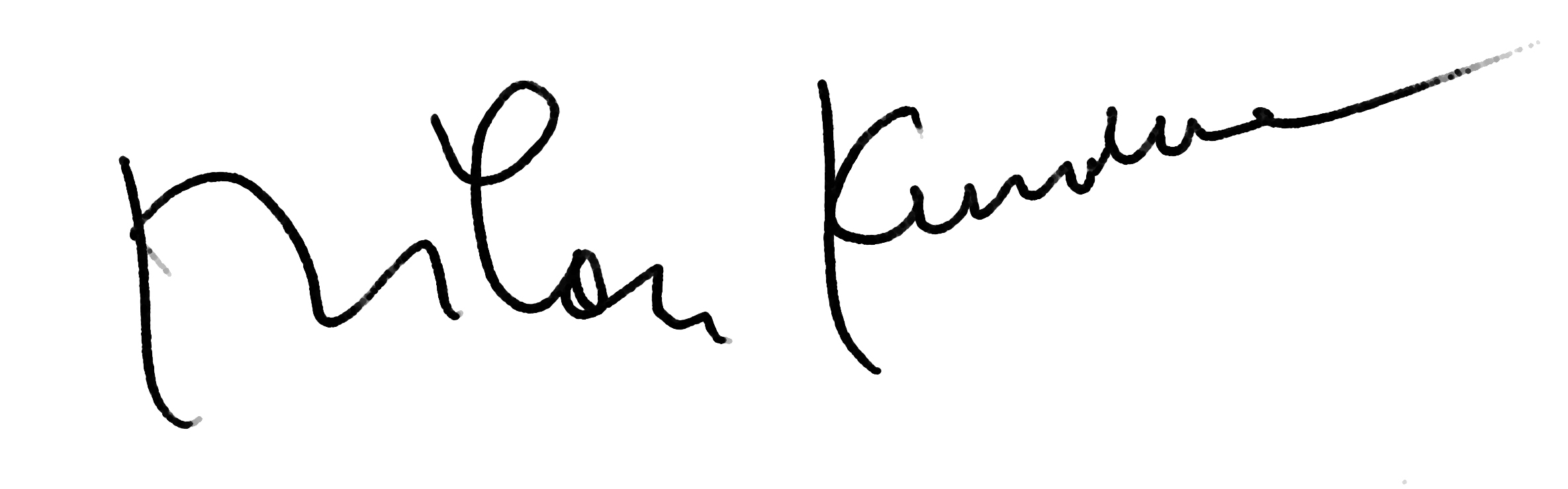

Milan Kundera (UK: /ˈkʊndərə, ˈkʌn-/ KU(U)N-dər-ə; Czech: [ˈmɪlan ˈkundɛra]; 1 April 1929 – 11 July 2023) was a Czech and French novelist. Kundera went into exile in France in 1975, acquiring citizenship in 1981. His Czechoslovak citizenship was revoked in 1979, but he was granted Czech citizenship in 2019.

Kundera's best-known work is The Unbearable Lightness of Being. Before the Velvet Revolution of 1989, the country's ruling Communist Party of Czechoslovakia banned his books. He led a low-profile life and rarely spoke to the media. He was thought to be a contender for the Nobel Prize in Literature and was also a nominee for other awards.

Kundera was awarded the Jerusalem Prize in 1985, the Austrian State Prize for European Literature in 1987, and the Herder Prize in 2000. In 2021, he received the Golden Order of Merit from the president of Slovenia, Borut Pahor.

== Early life and education ==
Milan Kundera was born on 1 April 1929 at 6 Purkyňova Street in Královo Pole, a district of Brno, Czechoslovakia (present-day Czech Republic), to a middle-class family. His father, Ludvík Kundera (1891–1971), was an important Czech musicologist and pianist who served as the head of the Janáček Music Academy in Brno from 1948 to 1961. His mother Milada Kunderová (born Janošíková) was an educator. His father died in 1971, and his mother in 1975.

Kundera learned to play the piano from his father and later studied musicology and musical composition. Musicological influences, references and notation can be found throughout his work. Kundera was a cousin of Czech writer and translator Ludvík Kundera. In his youth, having been supported by his father in his musical education, he was testing his abilities as a composer. One of his teachers at the time was Pavel Haas. His approach to music was eventually dampened due to his father not being able to launch a piano career for insisting on playing the music of modernist Jewish composer Arnold Schoenberg.

At the age of eighteen, he joined the Communist Party of Czechoslovakia in 1947. In 1984, he recalled that "Communism captivated me as much as Stravinsky, Picasso and Surrealism."

He attended lectures on music and composition at the Charles University in Prague but soon moved to the Film and TV School of the Academy of Performing Arts in Prague (FAMU) to study film. In 1950, he was expelled from the party. After graduating, the Film Faculty appointed Kundera a lecturer in world literature in 1952. Following the Warsaw Pact invasion of Czechoslovakia in 1968, he lost his job at the Film Faculty. In 1956, Kundera also married for the first time, the operetta singer Olga Haas. Her parents were his music teacher, composer Pavel Haas, and the doctor of Russian origin Sonia Jakobson, who was the first wife of Roman Jakobson.

== Political activism and professional career ==
His expulsion from the Communist party was described by Jan Trefulka in his novella Pršelo jim štěstí (Luck Rained on Them, 1962). Kundera also used the expulsion as an inspiration for the main theme of his novel Žert (The Joke, 1967), in which he ridiculed the ruling Communist party. In 1956 Kundera was readmitted to the party but was expelled for a second time in 1970. He took part in the Fourth Congress of the Czech Writers union in June 1967, where he delivered an impressive speech. In the speech he focused on the Czech effort to maintain a certain cultural independence among its larger European neighbours. Along with other reformist Communist writers such as Pavel Kohout, he was peripherally involved in the 1968 Prague Spring. This brief period of reformist activities was crushed by the Warsaw Pact invasion of Czechoslovakia in August 1968.

Kundera remained committed to reforming Czechoslovak Communism, and argued vehemently in print with fellow Czech writer Václav Havel, saying, essentially, that everyone should remain calm and that "nobody is being locked up for his opinions yet," and "the significance of the Prague Autumn may ultimately be greater than that of the Prague Spring." In 1968, the year his books were banned by the Czech Government, he made his first journey to Paris, where he befriended the publisher Claude Gallimard. After he returned to Prague, he was frequently visited by Gallimard who encouraged Kundera to emigrate to France and also smuggled the manuscript for Life Is Elsewhere out of Czechoslovakia. Finally, Kundera gave in and moved to France in 1975. In 1979, his Czechoslovak citizenship was revoked. He lectured for a few years at the University of Rennes. After three years, he moved to Paris.

== Works ==
Although his early poetic works are staunchly pro-communist, his novels escape ideological classification. Kundera repeatedly insisted that he was a novelist rather than a politically motivated writer. Political commentary all but disappeared from his novels after the publication of The Unbearable Lightness of Being except in relation to broader philosophical themes. Kundera's style of fiction, interlaced with philosophical digression, was greatly inspired by the novels of Robert Musil and the philosophy of Nietzsche. In 1945 the journal Gong published his translation of some of the works from the Russian poet Vladimir Majakovsky. The next year the journal Mladé archy printed a poem of his, to which he was inspired by his cousin Ludvík Kundera, also a writer.

In the mid-1950s he was readmitted to the Communist party and he was able to publish Manː A Wide Garden in 1953, a long epic poem in 1955 called The Last May dedicated to Julius Fucik and the collection of lyrical poetry Monologue in 1957. Those, together with other fore and afterwords are deemed to be written in the fashion of uncontroversial propaganda which allowed him to benefit to a certain degree from the advantages that came with being an established writer in a Communist environment. In 1962 he wrote the play The Owners of the Keys, which became an international success and was translated into several languages. Kundera himself claimed inspiration from Renaissance authors such as Giovanni Boccaccio, Rabelais and, perhaps most importantly, Miguel de Cervantes, to whose legacy he considered himself most committed. Other influences include Laurence Sterne, Henry Fielding, Denis Diderot, Robert Musil, Witold Gombrowicz, Hermann Broch, Franz Kafka, Martin Heidegger and Georges Bataille. Originally he wrote in the Czech language, but from 1985 onwards, he made a conscious transition from Czech towards the French which has since become the reference language for his translations. Between 1985 and 1987, he undertook the revision of the French translations of his earlier works himself. With Slowness his first work in French was published in 1995. His works were translated into more than eighty languages.

=== The Joke ===
In his first novel, The Joke (1967), he satirized the totalitarianism of the Communist era. Following the Soviet occupation of Czechoslovakia in August 1968, the book was banned. His criticism of the Soviet invasion in 1968 led to his blacklisting in Czechoslovakia and the banning of his books.

=== Life Is Elsewhere ===
Kundera's second novel was first published in French as La vie est ailleurs in 1973 and in Czech as Život je jinde in 1979. Life Is Elsewhere is a satirical portrait of the fictional poet Jaromil, a young and very naïve idealist who becomes involved in political scandals. For the novel Kundera was awarded the Prix Médicis the same year.

=== The Book of Laughter and Forgetting ===
In 1975, Kundera moved to France where The Book of Laughter and Forgetting was published in 1979. An unusual mixture of novel, short story collection, and authorial musings which came to characterize his works in exile, the book dealt with how Czechs opposed the Communist regime in various ways. Critics noted that the Czechoslovakia Kundera portrays "is, thanks to the latest political redefinitions, no longer precisely there," which is the "kind of disappearance and reappearance" Kundera ironically explores in the book.

=== The Unbearable Lightness of Being ===
Kundera's most famous work, The Unbearable Lightness of Being, was published in 1984. The book chronicles the fragile nature of an individual's fate, theorizing that a single lifetime is insignificant in the scope of Nietzsche's concept of eternal return. In an infinite universe, everything is guaranteed to recur infinitely. In 1988, American director Philip Kaufman released a film adaptation, which Kundera disliked. The book focuses on the life of a Czech dissident surgeon's journey from Prague to Zurich and his return to Prague, where he was not permitted to take up work as a surgeon. He worked instead as a window washer and used his job to arrange sex with hundreds of women. At the end he and his wife move to the country. The book was not published in Czechoslovakia due to Kundera's fear it would be badly edited. He eventually delayed the publishing date for years and only in 2006 would an official translation be available in the Czech language. The book had already been available in Czech, having been published in 1985 by a Czech expatriate in Canada.

=== Ignorance ===
In 2000, Ignorance was published. The novel centres on the romance of two alienated Czech émigrés, two decades after the Prague Spring of 1968. It is thematically concerned with the suffering of emigration. In it, Kundera undermines the myths surrounding nostalgia and the émigré's longing for return. He concludes that in the "etymological light nostalgia seems something like the pain of ignorance, of not knowing." Kundera suggests a complex relationship between memory and nostalgia, writing that our memory can "create rifts both with our earlier selves and between people who ostensibly share a past." The main characters of Irena and Josef discover how emigration and forgetfulness have ultimately freed them from their pain. Kundera draws heavily from the myth of Odysseus, specifically the "mythology of home, the delusions of roots." Linda Asher translated the original French version of the novel to English in 2002.

=== The Festival of Insignificance ===
The 2014 novel focuses on the musings of four male friends living in Paris who discuss their relationships with women and the existential predicament confronting individuals in the world, among other things. The novel received generally negative reviews. Michiko Kakutani of the New York Times describes the book as being a "knowing, pre-emptive joke about its own superficiality". A review in the Economist stated that the book was "sadly let down by a tone of breezy satire that can feel forced".

== Writing style and philosophy ==
François Ricard suggested that Kundera conceived his fiction with regard to the overall body of his work, rather than limiting his ideas to the scope of just one novel at a time, his themes and meta-themes traversing his entire œuvre. Each new book manifests the latest stage of his personal philosophy. Some of these meta-themes include exile, identity, life beyond the border (beyond love, beyond art, beyond seriousness), history as a continual return, and the pleasure of a less "important" life.

Many of Kundera's characters seem to develop as expositions of one of these themes at the expense of their full humanity. Specifics in regard to the characters tend to be rather vague. Often, more than one main character is used in a novel; Kundera may have even completely discontinued a character, resuming the plot with somebody new. As he told Philip Roth in an interview in The Village Voice: "Intimate life [is] understood as one's personal secret, as something valuable, inviolable, the basis of one's originality".

Kundera's early novels explore the dual tragic and comic aspects of totalitarianism. He did not view his works, however, as political commentary. "The condemnation of totalitarianism doesn't deserve a novel", he said. According to the Mexican novelist Carlos Fuentes, "What he finds interesting is the similarity between totalitarianism and the immemorial and fascinating dream of a harmonious society where private life and public life form but one unity and all are united around one will and one faith". In exploring the dark humour of this topic, Kundera seems deeply influenced by Franz Kafka.

Kundera considered himself a writer without a message. In Sixty-three Words, a chapter in The Art of the Novel, Kundera tells of a Scandinavian publisher who hesitated to publish The Farewell Party because of its apparent anti-abortion message. Not only was the publisher wrong about the existence of such a message, Kundera explained, but, "I was delighted with the misunderstanding. I had succeeded as a novelist. I succeeded in maintaining the moral ambiguity of the situation. I had kept faith with the essence of the novel as an art: irony. And irony doesn't give a damn about messages!".

Kundera also ventured often into musical matters, analyzing Czech folk music for example; or quoting from Leoš Janáček and Bartók; or placing musical excerpts into the text, as in The Joke; or discussing Schoenberg and atonality.

== Miroslav Dvořáček controversy ==
On 13 October 2008, the Czech weekly Respekt reported that an investigation was being carried out by the state-funded historical archive and research Institute for the Study of Totalitarian Regimes, into whether a young Kundera had denounced a returned defector, Miroslav Dvořáček, to the StB, or Czechoslovak secret police, in 1950. The accusation was based on a police station report which named "Milan Kundera, student, born 1.4.1929" as the informant in regard to Dvořáček's presence at a student dormitory. But the report did not include his ID card number, which was usually included, nor his signature. According to the police report, the ultimate source of the information about Dvořáček's previous desertion from military service and defection to the West was Iva Militká.

Dvořáček had allegedly fled Czechoslovakia after being ordered to join the infantry in the wake of a purge of the flight academy, and returned to Czechoslovakia as an agent of an anti-communist espionage agency organised by Czechoslovak exiles, an allegation which was not mentioned in the police report. Dvořáček returned secretly to the student dormitory of a friend's ex-girlfriend, Iva Militká. Militká was dating and later married a fellow student, Ivan Dlask, who knew Kundera. The police report alleges that Militká told Dlask of Dvořáček's presence, and that Dlask told Kundera, who told the secret police. Although the prosecutor sought the death penalty, Dvořáček was sentenced to 22 years of hard labour, fined 10,000 crowns, stripped of personal property, and deprived of his civic rights for ten years. Dvořáček served 14 years in a labor camp, some of it working in a uranium mine, before he was released.

In his response to Respekt's announcement, Kundera denied turning Dvořáček into the StB, stating he never knew him at all, and could not even remember an individual named "Militká". On 14 October 2008, the Czech Security Forces Archive announced that they had ruled out the possibility that the document could be a forgery, but refused to arrive at any other definite conclusions. Vojtech Ripka of the Institute for the Study of Totalitarian Regimes said, "There are two pieces of circumstantial evidence [the police report and its sub-file], but we, of course, cannot be one hundred percent sure. Unless we find all survivors, which is unfortunately impossible, it will not be complete." Ripka added that the signature on the police report matches the name of a man who worked in the corresponding National Security Corps section and that a police protocol is missing.

Many in the Czech Republic condemned Kundera as a "police informer", while many others accused Respekt of committing journalistic misconduct by publishing such a poorly researched piece. On the other hand, presenting an ID card was a procedure whenever dealing with the StB in 1950. Kundera was the student representative of the dorm Dvořáček had visited, and while it cannot be ruled out that another student could have denounced him to the StB using Kundera's name, impersonating someone else in a Stalinist police state posed a significant risk. Contradictory statements by Kundera's fellow students appeared in the Czech news media in the wake of this scandal. Historian Adam Hradílek, the co-author of the Respekt article, was also accused of an undeclared conflict of interest since one of the individuals involved in the incident was his aunt. Nonetheless, Respekt states on its website that its task is to "impartially study the crimes of the former communist regime". With time, the Western journalists realized the whole controversy was flawed, with French newspapers defending Kundera. The literary scholar Karen de Kunes investigated the reports and came to the conclusion that even if Kundera had issued the report, all he reported was the existence of a suitcase in the hallway.

On 3 November 2008, eleven internationally recognized writers came to Kundera's defence, including four Nobel laureates, Orhan Pamuk, Gabriel García Márquez, Nadine Gordimer and J. M. Coetzee, as well as Carlos Fuentes, Juan Goytisolo, Philip Roth, Salman Rushdie, and Jorge Semprún.

== Awards and honours ==
In 1973, Life Is Elsewhere received the French Prix Médicis. In 1979 Kundera was awarded the Mondello Prize for The Farewell Party. In 1985, Kundera received the Jerusalem Prize. His acceptance address appears among the essays collected in The Art of the Novel. He won The Austrian State Prize for European Literature in 1987. In 2000, he was awarded the international Herder Prize. In 2007, he was awarded the Czech State Literature Prize. In 2009, he was awarded the Prix mondial Cino Del Duca. In 2010, he was made an honorary citizen of his hometown, Brno. When he died the Greek Newspaper Efimerida ton Syntakton (Journal of the editors) published a special section where all the current affairs on each page were described with a book title of Kundera's.

In 2011, he received the Ovid Prize. The asteroid 7390 Kundera, discovered at the Kleť Observatory in 1983, is named in his honour. In 2020, he was awarded the Franz Kafka Prize, a Czech literary award.

== Personal life ==
Grave of Milan and Věra Kundera at Brno Central Cemetery.

Stripped of Czechoslovak citizenship in 1979, Kundera became a French citizen in 1981. He maintained contact with Czech and Slovak friends in his homeland, but rarely returned and never with any fanfare. He was granted Czech citizenship in 2019. He saw himself as a French writer and insisted his work should be studied as French literature and classified as such in bookstores.

Kundera was married twice. His first wife was the singer Olga Haasová-Smrčková (1937–2022), daughter of composer Pavel Haas, whom he married in 1956. His second marriage was to Věra Hrabánková (1935–2024), whom he married in 1967. Vera reportedly was his secretary, translator of his works and the gatekeeper between Kundera and the outside world.

Kundera died after a prolonged illness, in Paris on 11 July 2023, at the age of 94. He was cremated in Paris on 19 July 2023 and, on 18 June 2026, buried with his wife Věra in Brno Central Cemetery.

== Bibliography ==
=== Novels ===
- The Joke (Žert) (1967)
- Life Is Elsewhere (Život je jinde) (1969)
- The Farewell Waltz (Valčík na rozloučenou) (Original translation title: The Farewell Party) (French version "La Valse aux Adieux") (1972)
- The Book of Laughter and Forgetting (Kniha smíchu a zapomnění) (1979)
- The Unbearable Lightness of Being (Nesnesitelná lehkost bytí) (1984)
- Immortality (Nesmrtelnost) (1988)
- Slowness (La Lenteur) (1995)
- Identity (L'Identité) (1998)
- Ignorance (L'Ignorance) (2000)
- The Festival of Insignificance (La fête de l'insignifiance) (2014)

=== Short fiction ===
==== Collections ====
- Laughable Loves (Směšné lásky) (1969)

==== Stories ====
- The Apologizer (2015)

=== Poetry collections ===
- Člověk zahrada širá (Man: A Wide Garden) (1953)
- Poslední máj (The Last May) (1955) – celebration of Julius Fučík
- Monology (Monologues) (1957)

=== Essays ===
- Český úděl (The Czech Deal) in Listy (December 1968)
- Radikalizmus a expozice (Radicalism and Exhibitionism) (1969)
- The Art of the Novel (L'art du Roman) (1986)
- Testaments Betrayed: An Essay in Nine Parts (Les testaments trahis: essai) (1993)
- D'en bas tu humeras les roses – rare book in French, illustrated by Ernest Breleur (1993)
- The Curtain (Le Rideau) (2005)
- Encounter: Essays (Une rencontre) (2009)

=== Drama ===
- Majitelé klíčů (The Owners of the Keys) (1962)
- Ptákovina (The Blunder) (1969)
- Jacques and His Master(Jakub a jeho pán: Pocta Denisu Diderotovi) (1981)

=== Articles ===
- What is a novelist (2006)
- Die Weltliteratur (2007)

=== Non-fiction ===
- A Kidnapped West: The Tragedy of Central Europe (2023)
