= The Unbearable Lightness of Being =

1984 Czech novel by Milan Kundera

- First edition (French)
- Author: Milan Kundera
- Original title: Nesnesitelná lehkost bytí
- Language: Czech
- Genre: Philosophical fiction
- Publisher: Gallimard (France); 68 Publishers (Czech language); Harper & Row (US); Faber & Faber (UK)
- Publication date: 1984 (French translation); 1985 (original Czech)
- Publication place: France
- English publication date: 1984
- Media type: Print (hardcover)
- Pages: 393 (French 1st edition)

The Unbearable Lightness of Being (Czech: Nesnesitelná lehkost bytí) is a 1984 novel by Milan Kundera about two women, two men, a dog, and their lives in the 1968 Prague Spring period of Czechoslovak history.

Though written in 1982, the novel was not published until two years later, in a French translation (as L'insoutenable légèreté de l'être). The same year, it was translated from Czech into English by Michael Henry Heim, and excerpts were published in The New Yorker.

The original Czech-language text was published the following year. A feature-length film adaptation of the same title was released in 1988.

== Plot ==
In 1968, Tomáš, a gifted surgeon in Prague, lives according to a personal philosophy of “lightness”, indulging in numerous sexual encounters without attachment. Previously married, he avoids all contact with his former wife and their young son, Šimon, embracing a life of permanent detachment. During a trip to a provincial town, he meets Tereza, a café waitress. When she later follows him to the capital, he understands that she is essentially entrusting her life to him. As a habitual womanizer, he initially resists his growing affection, but eventually gives in to it.

Tereza, dissatisfied with her existence in her small hometown and eager to escape her coarse mother, sees in Tomáš both an intellectual and a dreamer. She falls for him immediately. They move in together, yet Tomáš continues seeing other women. At first he conceals his infidelity, but later admits it, insisting that his sexual encounters have no bearing on his devotion to her. Unable to embrace such a separation between love and physical desire, Tereza is plagued by disturbing dreams and sinks into despair, contemplating suicide.

The political liberalization of the Prague Spring ends abruptly in August with the Soviet invasion. Because of a past essay criticizing the ruling regime, Tomáš is warned to flee. In 1969, hoping to secure Tereza’s happiness, Tomáš marries her – but does not abandon his lovers. Among them is Sabina, a talented, free-spirited painter and his closest confidante. Tereza is drawn to Sabina’s openness, and they become friends. Sabina even helps Tereza find work as a photographer in Prague, but the undercurrent of jealousy over Tomáš remains.

In 1970, Sabina leaves for the West, and eventually Tomáš and Tereza join her in Zurich, Switzerland. However, Tereza feels purposeless without her photography and grows resentful while Tomáš continues his affairs. Believing that “when the strong are too weak to hurt the weak, the weak must be strong enough to leave”, she returns to Czechoslovakia a year later. Tomáš, after briefly enjoying his regained independence, follows her back later that same year – knowing this means abandoning the possibility of leaving the country again.

However, in Prague, 1972, Tomáš’s political troubles deepen. He refuses to sign a statement retracting his political criticism, costing him his surgical career. Both state authorities and dissident circles attempt to enlist him, but he rejects being used by either. His estranged son, Šimon, now politically active, lectures him to no avail. Seeking anonymity, Tomáš takes work cleaning windows, though his notoriety endures, and he continues his sexual encounters with other women.

In 1973, Tereza, now working as a bartender, has an affair with a visiting engineer in an attempt to emulate Tomáš’s detachment. The experience leaves her feeling worse – convinced the man was a police informant gathering evidence. After much emotional turmoil, she persuades Tomáš to relocate to a rural village, ending his sexual encounters. Life in the countryside brings them tranquility, but their time is cut short when they die together in a sudden car accident the following year.

Meanwhile in Geneva, 1971, Sabina embarks on a relationship with Franz, a married academic whose idealism aligns more with Tereza’s sensibilities than her own. Franz idolizes Sabina, but feels tormented by betraying his wife, Marie-Claude. Sabina, in contrast, views this betrayal as an exhilarating step into the unknown.

A year after, when Franz leaves his marriage expecting to live with her, Sabina disappears – first to Paris, then to the United States. Two years later, she learns of Tomáš and Tereza’s deaths from a letter, sensing the severing of her last tie to her past. Settling temporarily with an elderly American couple, Sabina wonders if her restless wandering has finally reached its end.

In 1975, Franz remains separated from his ex-wife and begins seeing a young student with oversized glasses who adores him. Still clinging to a romanticized vision of Sabina, he dies believing she would have approved of his choices. After his death, his ex-wife takes charge of his burial, inscribing his grave with the words, “A return after long wanderings”.

== Characters ==
- Tomáš: A Czech surgeon and intellectual. Tomáš is a womanizer who lives for his work. He considers sex and love to be distinct entities: he has sex with many women but loves only his wife, Tereza. He sees no contradiction between these two positions. He explains womanizing as an imperative to explore female idiosyncrasies only expressed during sex. At first he views his wife as a burden whom he is obliged to take care of. After the Warsaw Pact invasion, they escape to Zürich, where he starts womanizing again. Tereza, homesick, returns to Prague with the dog. He quickly realizes he wants to be with her and follows her home. He has to deal with the consequences of a letter to the editor in which he metaphorically likened the Czech Communists to Oedipus. Eventually fed up with life in Prague under the Communist regime, Tomáš and Tereza move to the countryside. He abandons his twin obsessions of work and womanizing and discovers true happiness with Tereza. His epitaph, written by his Catholic son, is "He Wanted the Kingdom of God on Earth".
- Tereza: Tomáš's young wife. A waitress from a hotel restaurant in a small provincial town, became a photographer with the help of one of Tomáš's lovers, she delves into dangerous and dissident photojournalism during the Soviet occupation of Prague. Tereza does not condemn Tomáš for his infidelities, instead characterizing herself as a weaker person. Tereza is mostly defined by her view of the body as disgusting and shameful, due to her mother's embrace of the body's grotesque functions. Throughout the book she fears simply being another body in Tomáš's array of women. Once Tomáš and Tereza move to the countryside, she devotes herself to raising cattle and reading. During this time she learns about her anima through an adoration of pet animals, reaching the conclusion that they were the last link to the paradise abandoned by Adam and Eve and becomes alienated from other people.
- Sabina: Tomáš's mistress and closest friend. Sabina lives her life as an extreme example of lightness, taking profound satisfaction in the act of betrayal. She declares war on kitsch and struggles against the constraints imposed upon her by her puritan ancestry and the Communist Party. This struggle is shown through her paintings. She occasionally expresses excitement at humiliation, as shown through the use of her grandfather's bowler hat, a symbol that is born during one sexual encounter with Tomáš, before it eventually changes meaning and becomes a relic of the past. Later in the novel, she begins to correspond with Šimon while living under the roof of some older Americans who admire her artistic skill. She then becomes Franz's lover after he confesses to her.
- Franz: Sabina's lover and a Geneva professor and idealist. Franz falls in love with Sabina, whom he considers a liberal and romantically tragic Czech dissident. He is a kind and compassionate man. As one of the novel's dreamers, Franz bases his actions on loyalty to the memories of his mother and Sabina. His life revolves completely around books and academia, eventually to the extent that he seeks lightness and ecstasy by participating in marches and protests, the last of which is a march in Thailand to the border with Cambodia. In Bangkok after the march, he is mortally wounded during a mugging.
- Karenin: The dog of Tomáš and Tereza. Although she is a female dog, the name is masculine and is a reference to Alexei Karenin, the husband in Anna Karenina. Karenin displays extreme dislike of change. Once moved to the countryside, Karenin becomes more content as she is able to enjoy more attention from her companions. She also quickly befriends a pig named Mefisto. During this time Tomáš discovers that Karenin has cancer and even after removing a tumor it is clear that Karenin is going to die. On her deathbed she unites Tereza and Tomáš through her "smile" at their attempts to improve her health.
- Šimon: Tomáš's estranged son from an earlier marriage.

== Philosophical underpinnings ==
Challenging the concept of eternal recurrence (the idea that the universe and its events have already occurred and will recur ad infinitum), the story's thematic meditations posit the alternative: that each person has only one life to live and that which occurs in life occurs only once and never again – thus the "lightness" of being. Moreover, this lightness also signifies freedom; Tomáš and Sabina display this lightness, whereas Tereza's character is "weighed down". In Constance Garnett's translation of Tolstoy's War and Peace she gives us the phrase "strange lightness of being" during the description of Prince Andrey's death. In contrast, the concept of eternal recurrence imposes a "heaviness" on life and the decisions that are made. Nietzsche believed this heaviness could be either a tremendous burden or great benefit depending on the individual's perspective.

Quoting Kundera from the book:

The heavier the burden, the closer our lives come to the earth, the more real and truthful they become. Conversely, the absolute absence of burden causes man to be lighter than air, to soar into heights, take leave of the earth and his earthly being, and become only half real, his movements as free as they are insignificant. What then shall we choose? Weight or lightness? ... When we want to give expression to a dramatic situation in our lives, we tend to use metaphors of heaviness. We say that something has become a great burden to us. We either bear the burden or fail and go down with it, we struggle with it, win or lose. And Sabina – what had come over her? Nothing. She had left a man because she felt like leaving him. Had he persecuted her? Had he tried to take revenge on her? No. Her drama was a drama not of heaviness but of lightness. What fell to her lot was not the burden, but the unbearable lightness of being.

In the novel, Nietzsche's concept is attached to an interpretation of the German adage einmal ist keinmal 'one occurrence is not significant'; namely, an "all-or-nothing" cognitive distortion that Tomáš must overcome in his hero's journey. He initially believes "If we only have one life to live, we might as well not have lived at all," and specifically (with respect to committing to Tereza) "There is no means of testing which decision is better, because there is no basis for comparison." The novel resolves this question decisively that such a commitment is in fact possible and desirable.

== Publication ==
The Unbearable Lightness of Being (1984) was not published in the original Czech until 1985 by the exile publishing house 68 Publishers (Toronto, Ontario). The second Czech edition was published in October 2006, in Brno, Czech Republic, some 18 years after the Velvet Revolution, because Kundera did not approve it earlier. The first English translation by Michael Henry Heim was published in hardback in 1984 by Harper & Row in the U.S. and Faber and Faber in the UK and in paperback in 1985.

== Film ==
In 1988, an American-made film adaptation of the novel was released starring Daniel Day-Lewis, Lena Olin and Juliette Binoche and directed by Philip Kaufman. In a note to the Czech edition of the book, Kundera remarks that the movie had very little to do with the spirit either of the novel or the characters in it. In the same note, Kundera goes on to say that after this experience he no longer allows any adaptations of his work.

== See also ==
- Existentialism
