= Jean-Luc Godard filmography =

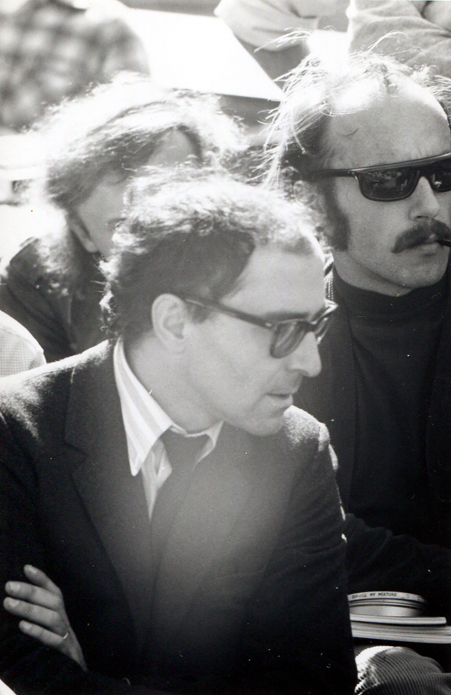
Godard, 1968

Jean-Luc Godard was a French-Swiss film director, screenwriter and film editor whose career spanned nearly seventy years. He directed, wrote, produced and edited many films. The following attempts to be a comprehensive filmography.

== Early short films: 1955–1959 ==
Year	Title	English title	Notes
1955	Opération béton	Operation Concrete	Narrator; also Editor
1955	Une Femme Coquette	A Coquettish Woman	Credited as Hans Lucas; also Editor and Cinematographer
1958	Une histoire d'eau	A Story of Water	Co-directed with François Truffaut; also Editor
1958	Charlotte et son Jules	Charlotte and Her Boyfriend	Uncredited as the voice of Jules; also Editor
1959	'Charlotte et Véronique, ou Tous les garçons s'appellent Patrick'	All the Boys Are Called Patrick	

== New Wave (Nouvelle Vague): 1960–1967 ==
=== Feature films ===
Year	Original title	English title	Notes
1960	À Bout de Souffle	Breathless	The Snitch; co-conceived with François Truffaut
1961	Une Femme est une Femme	A Woman Is a Woman	
1962	Vivre sa vie		Voice of Nana's boyfriend
1963	Le Petit Soldat (actually Godard's second feature in 1960, release delayed by censorship)		Uncredited as actor
1963	Les Carabiniers	The Carabineers	
1963	Le Mépris	Contempt	Uncredited as actor
1964	Bande à part		Uncredited as narrator
1964	Une Femme Mariée	A Married Woman	Uncredited as narrator
1965	Alphaville: une étrange aventure de Lemmy Caution	Alphaville	
1965	Pierrot le Fou		
1966	Masculin Féminin		
1966	Made in U.S.A.		Uncredited as the voice of Richard Politzer
1967	2 ou 3 Choses que je sais d'Elle	Two or Three Things I Know About Her	Narrator; co-written with Catherine Vimenet
1967	La Chinoise		
1967	Week-end		

=== Short films ===
Year	Original title	English title	Notes
1962	La Paresse	Sloth	From The Seven Deadly Sins
1962	Il Nuovo Mondo	The New World	From RoGoPaG
1964	Le Grand Escroc	The Great Swindler	Narrator; from The World's Most Beautiful Swindlers
1964	Reportage sur Orly	Reporting on Orly	
1965	Montparnasse-Levallois		From Six in Paris
1967	Anticipation, ou: l'amour en l'an 2000	Anticipation: or Love in the Year 2000	From The World's Oldest Profession
1967	Caméra-oeil	Camera-Eye	From Far from Vietnam
1967	L'amore (Andate e ritorno dei figli prodighi)	Love: Departure and Return of the Prodigal Children	From Love and Anger

== Dziga Vertov Group/political films: 1968–1972 ==
Although Godard and Jean-Pierre Gorin were the principal creative forces behind these films, they usually went without on-screen credit. Most of the films from this time period were credited to the Dziga Vertov Group collective.

Year	Original title	English title	Notes
1968	Ciné-tracts		
1968	Le Rouge: Film-Tract: n° 1968		Co-directed and written with Gérard Fromanger; also Editor and Producer
1968	Un Film comme les Autres	A Film Like Any Other	Editor
1968	Sympathy for the Devil		
1968	One A.M. (One American Movie)		Unfinished; also cinematographer. Incorporated into One P.M. by D. A. Pennebaker (1971).
1969	Le Gai Savoir	Joy of Learning	Narrator; also Editor
1969	British Sounds		Co-directed and written with Jean-Henri Roger
1969	Pravda		
1969	Vent d'est	Wind from the East	Co-written and directed with Jean-Pierre Gorin, Editor
1969	Lotte en Italia	Struggles in Italy	Co-written and directed with Jean-Pierre Gorin
1970	Jusqu'à la Victoire	Until Victory	Unfinished; incorporated into Here and Elsewhere by Godard & Anne-Marie Miéville in 1974
1971	Vladimir et Rosa	Vladimir and Rosa	Vladimir Lenin; co-written and directed with Jean-Pierre Gorin; also Editor and Cinematographer
1971	Schick after Shave		
1972	Tout Va Bien		Co-written and directed with Jean-Pierre Gorin
1972	Letter to Jane		Co-written and directed with Jean-Pierre Gorin

== Transitional period (SonImage): 1974–1978 ==
Year	Original title	English title	Notes
1975	Numéro deux	Number Two	Himself; Co-written with Anne-Marie Miéville
1976	Ici et ailleurs	Here and Elsewhere	Narrator; co-director and co-writer
1976	Comment ça va	How's it going	Co-written and directed with Anne-Marie Miéville
1976	Six fois deux, sur et sous la communication	Six Times Two: Over and Under Communication	Himself; co-written and directed with Anne-Marie Miéville; also Editor and Producer
1977	Faut pas rêver	Dream On	Editor, Producer and Cinematographer
1978	France/tour/détour/deux enfants	France/Tour/Detour/Two Children	Robert Linard; Producer, uncredited as editor

== Swiss Films: 1979–1988 ==
=== Feature films ===
Year	Original title	English title	Notes
1980	Sauve qui Peut (la vie)	Every Man for Himself	Co-written with Jean-Claude Carrière and Anne-Marie Miéville, also Editor and Producer
1982	Passion		Co-written with Jean-Claude Carrière, also Editor
1983	Prénom: Carmen	First Name: Carmen	Uncredited as Uncle Jeannot
1985	Je vous salue, Marie	Hail Mary	
1985	Détective		Co-written with Alain Sarde and Philippe Setbon
1987	King Lear		Professor Pluggy; uncredited as writer; also Editor and Executive Producer
1987	Soigne ta Droite	Keep Your Right Up	The Idiot/Prince; also Editor

=== Short films/videos ===
Year	Original title	English title	Notes
1979	Quelques remarques sur la réalisation et la production du film 'Sauve qui peut (la vie)'	A Few Remarks on the Direction and Production of the Film "Sauve qui peut (la vie)"	Narrator
1981	Une bonne à tout faire	Good to Go	
1982	Lettre à Freddy Buache	A Letter to Freddy Buache	Himself
1982	Changer d'image	To Alter the Image	The Idiot; also Editor. From Le Changement a plus d'un titre (Change Has More Than One Title)
1982	Passion, le travail et l'amour: introduction à un scénario, ou Troisième état du scénario du film Passion		
1982	Scénario du film Passion		Narrator, Himself
1983	Petites notes à propos du film Je vous salue, Marie	Small Notes Regarding the Film	Himself
1986	Grandeur et décadence d'un petit commerce de cinéma	The Rise and Fall of a Small Film Company	Uncredited as actor and writer; made for the French TV series Série noire
1986	Soft and Hard		Himself; co-written and directed with Anne-Marie Miéville, also Editor
1986	Meetin' WA		Himself; also Editor
1987	Armide		From Aria
1988	On s'est tous défilé		Editor
1988	Closed Jeans: Marithé François Girbaud, série 1, 1-10	Closed Jeans: Marithé François Girbaud: Series 1: 1-10	Editor
1988	Closed: Marithé et François Girbaud, série 2, 1-7	Closed: Marithé and François Girbaud: Series 2: 1-7	Editor
1988	Puissance de la parole	The Power of Speech	
1988	Le Dernier mot/Les Français entendus par...	The Last Word/The French as Understood by...	From The French as Seen by...

== Late films: 1988–2023 ==
=== Feature and short films ===
Year	Original title	English title	Notes
1988-1998	Histoire(s) du cinéma	History(s) of the Cinema	Himself
1990	Nouvelle Vague		Uncredited as editor
1991	Allemagne Année 90 Neuf zéro	Germany Year 90 Nine Zero	Uncredited as editor
1993	Hélas pour moi	Oh Woe Is Me	
1994	JLG/JLG, Autoportrait de Décembre	JLG/JLG: Self-Portrait in December	Editor, Himself
1996	For Ever Mozart		Editor
2001	Eloge de l'amour	In Praise of Love	
2004	Notre Musique		Himself
2010	Film Socialisme		
2014	Adieu au Langage	Goodbye to Language	Uncredited as actor
2018	Le Livre d'Image	The Image Book	Last feature film
2023	Film annonce du film qui n'existera jamais : « Drôles de guerres »	Trailer of the Film That Will Never Exist: "Phony Wars"	
2024	Exposé du film annonce du film « Scénario »		
2024	Scénarios		Last short film

=== Video work ===
Year	Original title	English title	Notes
1989	Le Rapport Darty	The Darty Report / The Darty Connection	Nathanael, the 2000 year-old robot; co-directed with Anne-Marie Miéville
1990	Marithé François Girbaud: Métamorphojean		
1991	Pour Thomas Wainggai		From Contre l'oubli
1991	L'enfance de l'art		Co-written and directed with Anne-Marie Miéville; also Editor
1992	Parisienne People Cigarettes		Editor
1993	Les Enfants jouent à la Russie	The Kids Play Russian	Prince Mishkin; also Editor
1993	Je vous salue Sarajevo	I Salute Thee Sarajevo / Hail Sarajevo	Narrator; also Editor
1995	2 x 50 Ans de Cinéma Français	2 x 50 French Cinema Years	Himself; co-directed with Anne-Marie Miéville; also Editor
1996	Plus Oh!		Editor
1996	Espoir/Microcosmos		Editor
1998	Adieu au TNS		Himself
1999	The Old Place		Narrator; co-written and directed with Anne-Marie Miéville; also Editor
2000	De l'origine du XXIe Siècle	Origins of the 21st Century	Editor
2002	Dans le noir du temps		From Ten Minutes Older: The Cello
2002	Liberté et patrie	Freedom and Fatherland	Co-written and directed with Anne-Marie Miéville; also Editor
2004	Moments Choisis		Collage taken by Godard from Histoire(s) du Cinema; also Editor
2006	Ecce Homo		Editor and Producer
2006	Vrai Faux Passeport	True False Passport	Narrator; Editor and Producer
2006	Reportage amateur Maquette expo		Co-written and directed with Anne-Marie Miéville
2006	Prière pour Refusniks (1)	Prayer for Refuseniks (1)	Editor
2006	Prière pour refusniks (2)	Prayer for Refuseniks (2)	Editor
2008	Prière pour Refusniks (2)	Prayer for Refuseniks (2)	Editor
2008	Une Catastrophe	A Catastrophe	Trailer for Viennale, also Editor
2010	Tribute to Eric Rohmer		Uncredited as editor and actor
2013	Les trois désastres		From 3X3D, omnibus film with Peter Greenaway and Edgar Pera
2014	The Bridge of Sighs		From omnibus film Les Ponts de Sarajevo
2014	Letter in Motion to Gilles Jacob and Thierry Fremaux		Narrator
2015	Prix suisse, remerciements, mort ou vif		Himself
2018	22nd Ji.hlava IDFF		Himself; promotional short for the 22nd Jihlava International Documentary Film Festival

== Acting credit only ==
Year	Original title	English title	Acting Credit	Notes
1950	Le Château de Verre	The Glass Castle	Un passant	Uncredited
1956	Le coup du Berger	Fool's Mate	Un invité à la fête	Uncredited
1956	La Sonate à Kreutzer		Ami journaliste	
1960	Présentation ou Charlotte et son Steak	Presentation, or Charlotte and Her Steak	Walter	Short
1961	Paris Belongs to Us		Un homme à la terrasse	Credited as Hans Lucas
1961	Les fiancés du pont Mac Donald ou (Méfiez-vous des lunettes noires)		L'homme aux lunettes noires	Short
1962	Cléo from 5 to 7		Actor in silent film	Uncredited
1962	Le Signe du Lion		Le mélomane	Uncredited
1962	Sun in Your Eyes		Unknown	
1963	Shéhérazade		Unknown	
1966	The Defector		Orlovsky's Friend	Uncredited
1969	Ciné-girl		Lui-même	Uncredited
1975	Ne		Unknown	
1978	Der kleine Godard an das Kuratorium junger deutscher Film		The Guest	
1997	We're Still Here		L'homme comédien	
2000	After the Reconciliation		Robert	

== Contribution works ==
Year	Title	Notes
2019	Le Studio d'Orphée	Art Installation at the Fondazione Prada in Milan
2022	See You Friday, Robinson	Directed by Mitra Farahani, with visual contributions by Godard
