= Vladimir and Rosa =

- Original title: Vladimir et Rosa
- Directed by: Dziga Vertov Group
- Written by: Jean-Luc Godard & Jean-Pierre Gorin
- Produced by: Jean-Luc Godard & Jean-Pierre Gorin
- Starring: Yves Afonso; Juliet Berto; Frankie Dymon
- Release date: 1971
- Running time: 103 minutes
- Countries: France; West Germany
- Language: French

Vladimir and Rosa (Original title: Vladimir et Rosa) is a 1971 French-language drama film from France and West Germany by the Dziga Vertov Group. The film stars Yves Afonso, Juliet Berto, Frankie Dymon, while Godard and Gorin play the titular Vladimir and Rosa, respectively.

== Background ==
Vladimir and Rosa is another one of Godard-Gorin collaborations under the banner of their Dziga Vertov Group (DVG). Named after the Soviet constructivist theorist and film director, the group created a number of films where the subject matter revolved around socialist ideals. The DVG was dissolved soon after the completion of Vladimir and Rosa.

== Synopsis ==
Much like Godard's films from the time (British Sounds, Pravda, Lotte in Italia and Until Victory) Vladimir and Rosa too is an analysis of the prevailing political situation. The film's faux-Orwellian verbal outpouring introduces the Vietnam protesters being beaten by cops, before taking aim at the trial of the Chicago Eight, depicting a chaotic farce of a trial, with the defendants becoming a representation of French revolutionary society, as Godard and Gorin play Lenin and Karl Rosa.

== Critical reception ==
To some, Godard's best work was a string of exhilarating and iconoclastic films in the 1960s, rather harshly criticizing him for becoming "so politicized by the events of 1968 in France and elsewhere in the world" that he produced, including under the DVG banner, "a string of snooze-worthy, unwatchable Marxist lectures".

The film has been commended for its black humor and emphasis on the material processes of film-making, but not so much over "a rather defeatist rehash of arguments" and more specifically over Vladimir and Rosa being "dominated by an angry sense of defeat".
