= Le petit soldat =

- Directed by: Jean-Luc Godard
- Written by: Jean-Luc Godard
- Produced by: Georges de Beauregard
- Starring: Michel Subor; Anna Karina
- Cinematography: Raoul Coutard
- Edited by: Agnès Guillemot; Lila Herman; Nadine Marquand
- Music by: Maurice Leroux
- Distributed by: Les Films Imperia
- Release date: 1963
- Running time: 88 minutes
- Country: France
- Language: French

Le petit soldat (transl. The Little Soldier) is a French film written and directed by Jean-Luc Godard in 1960, but its release was delayed until 1963 by censorship. It was the first project on which Godard worked with Anna Karina, who stars alongside Michel Subor, but the third to be released. The film received generally positive reviews from critics.

== Plot ==
In 1958, during the Algerian War, Bruno Forestier is a deserter from the French army living in Geneva. Although he does not have particularly strong political convictions, he finds himself working for La Main Rouge, a French terrorist organization, while posing as a reporter. To prove he is not a double agent, he is ordered to kill Arthur Palivoda, a radio host who is pro-FLN (National Liberation Front) and in favour of Algerian independence. Although he has killed before, Bruno refuses this time, initially saying it is too dangerous, and then that he does not feel like doing it.

Bruno meets and falls in love with Véronica Dreyer, who, unbeknownst to him, is working with the FLN. When his compatriots in La Main Rouge stage a hit-and-run with his car, Bruno agrees to carry out the assassination so the charges will be dropped and he will not be sent back to France, but he keeps hesitating and then decides again not to kill Palivoda.

Now viewed as a traitor by the French, Bruno plans to escape to Brazil with Véronica, but he is captured and tortured by the Algerians, who had seen him following Palivoda. Eventually, he manages to escape by jumping through the window of the room in which he is being held, which turns out to be on the first floor. He tries to get two diplomatic passports from the French by telling them where he was held, but the Algerians have moved out, so he agrees to finally kill Palivoda to get the papers. Having discovered Véronica's ties to the FLN, the French abduct her, which they tell Bruno to try to gain additional leverage over him, and torture her for the location of the Algerians' current hideout. After Bruno kills Palivoda, he learns Véronica has died, but he says he learned not to be bitter about it.

== Cast ==
- Michel Subor as Bruno Forestier
- Anna Karina as Veronica Dreyer
- Henri-Jacques Huet as Jacques
- Paul Beauvais as Paul
- László Szabó as Laszlo

== Production ==
=== Pre-production ===
Jean-Luc Godard wanted to start on his second film immediately after his first feature, Breathless (1960), for a variety of reasons, one of which was that he believed his opportunity to make a second film would disappear if Breathless failed at the box office. Another was a desire to catch up to his French New Wave contemporaries, many of whom had already made multiple films. Breathless producer Georges de Beauregard would also be able to request more funds from the French government.

Godard devised the idea for Le petit soldat in wanting to make a film on the theme of "brainwashing," which he claimed he "got from reading [Arthur] Koestler." While working on Breathless, Godard told journalist Marc Pierret that his next film would be shot in Switzerland, "with three times less money," and be "something about torture." Godard was criticized by the French left for the perceived apolitical nature of Breathless, or, in some cases, a perceived right-wing one. The left also viewed many New Wave directors with suspicion due to their admiration for American filmmakers. In 1962, Godard attributed Le petit soldat to his attempt to correct his image as an apolitical filmmaker, telling Cahiers du Cinéma that "the New Wave is criticized for showing people only in bed; I’m going to show some who are in politics and don’t have time to go to bed."

== Reception ==
Le petit soldat has received generally positive reviews since its release. On review aggregator website Rotten Tomatoes, it has an approval rating of 80% based on 20 reviews. In a retrospective review, Roger Ebert awarded the film four stars out of four.

On Metacritic, the film has a score of 97 out of 100 based on 5 reviews, indicating "universal acclaim."

== Themes ==
The situation in Algeria and the denunciation of the use of torture by both sides are the main themes of the film.

Additionally, it explores a theme typical of Godard's later works: the nature of cinema and the image. The film contains a line of dialogue that has been quoted and debated many times: "Photography is truth and the cinema is truth 24 times a second" (French original: "la photographie est la vérité et le cinéma est la vérité 24 fois par seconde"). As a film critic and maker of film essays, Godard often critiqued the notion of photography/cinema being unvarnished truth. For example, his later film, Letter to Jane—a companion film essay to Tout va bien—is wholly devoted to deconstructing a photograph of Jane Fonda visiting North Vietnam during the War. Godard argues in Letter to Jane that photographs are always manipulations of the "truth".

== Works cited ==
- Brody, Richard (2008). Everything Is Cinema: The Working Life of Jean-Luc Godard (1. ed ed.). New York: Metropolitan Books. ISBN 978-0-8050-6886-3.
