= La Chinoise =

1967 film by Jean-Luc Godard

- Theatrical release poster
- Directed by: Jean-Luc Godard
- Screenplay by: Jean-Luc Godard
- Based on: Demons by Fyodor Dostoyevsky
- Starring: Anne Wiazemsky; Jean-Pierre Léaud; Juliet Berto; Michel Séméniako
- Cinematography: Raoul Coutard
- Edited by: Delphine Desfons; Agnès Guillemot
- Music by: Pierre Degeyter; Michel Legrand; Franz Schubert; Karlheinz Stockhausen; Antonio Vivaldi
- Production companies: Anouchka Films; Les Productions de la Guéville; Athos Films; Parc Films; Simar Films
- Distributed by: Athos Films
- Release date: 30 August 1967
- Running time: 96 minutes
- Country: France
- Language: French

La Chinoise, ou plutôt à la Chinoise: un film en train de se faire (lit. 'The Chinese, or, Rather, in the Chinese Manner: A Film in the Making'), commonly referred to simply as La Chinoise, (French pronunciation: [la ʃinwaz]) is a 1967 French political docufiction film written and directed by Jean-Luc Godard about a group of young Maoist activists in Paris.

La Chinoise is a loose adaptation of Fyodor Dostoyevsky's 1872 novel Demons (also known as The Possessed). In the novel, five disaffected citizens, each representing a different ideological persuasion and personality type, conspire to overthrow the Russian imperial regime through a campaign of sustained revolutionary violence. The film, set in contemporary Paris and largely taking place in a small apartment, is structured as a series of personal and ideological dialogues dramatizing the interactions of five French university students—three young men and two young women—belonging to a radical Maoist group called the "Aden Arabie Cell" (named after the novel Aden, Arabie by Paul Nizan). The film won the Grand Jury Prize in 1967 Venice Film Festival.

The film juxtaposes portraits of socialist revolutionaries with popular comic book heroes and imagery.

== Plot ==
In Paris, five young people—led by bourgeois leftist Véronique, a philosophy student at Nanterre University on her summer break who wishes to dismantle cultural and educational institutions through terrorism, and Guillaume Meister, her actor boyfriend—form a radical Maoist group, the "Aden Arabie" cell, while staying at a lavish apartment borrowed from one of the members' wealthy parents. The other members include Henri, a chemist; Henri's girlfriend Yvonne, a peasant girl from the countryside who occasionally engages in prostitution for extra money; and Kirilov, a nihilistic Soviet painter. A Black student named Omar also appears as a guest speaker in one of the group's lectures.

The group spend their time studying Marxist texts, delivering lectures to each other, and discussing how they can apply Maoism to their revolutionary ideology. The apartment walls are painted with political slogans and adorned with posters of Karl Marx and Mao Tse-tung, while copies of Mao's Little Red Book fill the bookshelves. Yvonne does most of the household chores in the apartment and is often isolated from the others during lectures and discussions. In one of Guillaume's lectures, Yvonne acts out satirical political skits protesting American imperialism in general, and U.S. President Lyndon Johnson's Vietnam policies in particular.

When Henri advocates the pro-Soviet Communist line and disagrees with the extremist and violent views held by his comrades, especially Véronique, he is denounced as a revisionist and expelled from the cell. An increasingly unstable Kirilov paints rainbows on the apartment walls before shooting himself dead. Véronique leaves the apartment alone and sets off on a mission to kill the Minister of Culture of the Soviet Union, Mikhail Sholokhov, during his official diplomatic visit to France. On the train ride to the planned assassination, Véronique engages in a discussion with political philosopher Francis Jeanson, (Note: Francis Jeanson was actually Anne Wiazemsky's philosophy professor at the Paris X University Nanterre from 1966 to 1967. A few years earlier, he had once been a communist and the head of a network that supported the Algerian national liberation movement. This led to his highly publicized arrest and trial by the French government in September 1960.) who argues against the use of violence as a means to shut down the French universities. However, this does not dissuade Véronique. (Note: For her dialogue in the train scene, Godard fed Wiazemsky her lines through an earpiece.)

Véronique arrives at the hotel where Sholokhov is staying. She mistakenly reverses the digits of the room number and kills the wrong man, then returns and carries out the assassination upon realizing her mistake. The revolutionary activities of the Aden Arabie cell prove unsuccessful, and after the remaining members have left the apartment, the original owners return to the apartment, tearing posters from the walls and removing the books from the shelves. Guillaume retreats to the countryside, working in a carnival-type game where people buy vegetables and throw them at his head. Véronique returns to school, having realized that she had only made "the first timid step of a long march".

== Cast ==
- Anne Wiazemsky as Véronique
- Jean-Pierre Léaud as Guillaume
- Michel Séméniako as Henri
- Juliet Berto as Yvonne
- Lex De Bruijn as Kirilov
- Omar Blondin Diop as Omar
- Francis Jeanson as himself
- Jean-Claude Sussfeld as driver

== Themes ==
Thematically, La Chinoise concerns the 1960s New Left political interest in such historical and ongoing events as the legacy of Lenin's October 1917 Russian Revolution, the escalating U.S. military activities in the increasingly unstable region of southeast Asia, and especially the Cultural Revolution brought about by the Red Guards under Mao Zedong in the People's Republic of China. The film also touches upon the rise of anti-humanist poststructuralism in French intellectual life by the mid-1960s, particularly the anti-empiricist ideas of the French Marxist, Louis Althusser.

Godard likewise portrays the role that certain objects and organizations—such as Mao's Little Red Book, the French Communist Party, and other small leftist factions—play in the developing ideology and activities of the Aden Arabie cell. These objects and organizations appear to become repurposed as entertainment products and fashion statements within a modern consumer-capitalist society—the very society which the student radicals hope to transform through their revolutionary project.

This paradox is illustrated in the various joke sunglasses that Guillaume wears (with the national flags of the U.S., USSR, China, France and Britain each filling the frames) while reading Mao's Little Red Book, as well as the sight gag of having dozens of copies of the Little Red Book piled in mounds on the floor to literally create a defensive parapet against the forces of capitalist imperialism, and a jaunty satirical pop song, "Mao-Mao" (sung by Claude Channes), heard on the soundtrack. Godard suggests that the students are, at the same moment, both serious committed revolutionaries intent on bringing about major social change and confused bourgeois youth flirting with the notion of radical politics as a fashionable and exciting distraction.

== Reception ==
La Chinoise is not one of Godard's most widely seen films, and until 2008 was unavailable on DVD in North America. However, a number of critics such as Pauline Kael, Andrew Sarris and Renata Adler have hailed it as among his best. Given that the film was made in March 1967—one year before violent student protest became a manifest social reality in France—La Chinoise is now regarded as an uncannily prescient and insightful examination of the New Left activism during those years.

Along with Pierrot le fou, Masculin, féminin, Two or Three Things I Know About Her and Week End, La Chinoise is often seen as signaling a decisive step towards Godard's eventual renunciation of "bourgeois" narrative filmmaking. By 1968 he had switched to an overtly-political phase of revolutionary Maoist-collectivist didactic films with Jean-Pierre Gorin and the Dziga Vertov Group, which lasted for the next six years until 1973.
