= A Film Like Any Other =

- Directed by: Jean-Luc Godard
- Cinematography: Jean-Luc Godard; William Lubtchansky
- Production company: Anouchka Films
- Release date: 29 December 1968 (USA)
- Running time: 120 minutes
- Country: France
- Language: French

A Film Like Any Other (Original title: Un film comme les autres) is a 1968 French-language documentary film by Jean-Luc Godard. It's Godard's first documentary work since Operation Concrete and marks his transition away from traditional narrative feature films toward subversive political essays.

== Background ==
The 1968 protest and civil unrest in France had culminated in nearly two month of demonstrations, general strikes, and the occupation of universities and factories by students and workers. The French Communist Party and the associated CGT union turned against the revolt and united with the Gaullist political forces, possibly motivated by self-preservation. The discussion of the revolts in the film omits these sides of the argument; Godard allows the participants in the revolt to speak for themselves and discuss how to proceed.

== Synopsis ==
The film offers reflections on the social upheaval of May 1968 in France in the immediate wake of the workers' and students' demonstrations. In July 1968, on the outskirts of Paris, three students and two workers of the Renault factory discuss May 1968 and the challenges of uniting militants across class lines. The camera is mostly static, watching the students from a distance through tall grass. Many scenes were shot with a telephoto lens. The participants' faces are rarely visible. The argument is punctuated by black-and-white newsreel footage of the May 1968 events, including occupation of the Sorbonne, and barricades and battles in the streets. This footage often illustrates the current topic of discussion.

Throughout the film, multiple dialogue tracks are overlapping, with the viewer only able to discern fleeting parts of the young students' and workers' discussion. The film's ending is deliberately anti-climactic, with a period of silence accompanied by the black and white footage and a sole voice calling on the viewers to establish a new social practice.

== Production ==
The date of production is unclear; the film was probably shot in August of 1968, but contradictory evidence exists. The film is often listed as one of Dziga Vertov Group, but while it thematically fits, it was produced by Godard prior to the group's formation. During this period, Godard strived to simplify the process of film production and move away from established, capitalist production infrastructure. The origin of the black and white footage is disputed: it's possible Godard shot the material himself, reusing footage intended for the collaborative Cinétracts project, or that it was provided by other directors.

The film was released on two 16mm reels of equal duration, not done for technical reasons, but to let the projectionist make an arbitrary decision of which half to show first. Supposedly, the audience would then vote if the other half was to be shown as well. The two reels share a good amount of repeated color footage.

== Reception ==
The film is often described as unwatchable or boring. During the US premiere, a majority of the audience left the cinema or demanded a refund. It can also be argued, however, that the film deliberately employs anti-spectacle techniques to deliberately anger the audience and provoke critical thought about the May revolt. Godard himself later called the film a failure, since it could not reach a wide audience.
