= Struggle in Italy =

- Original title: Lotte in Italia
- Directed by: Jean-Luc Godard; Jean-Pierre Gorin
- Written by: Jean-Luc Godard; Jean-Pierre Gorin
- Starring: Cristiana Tullio-Altan; Paolo Pozzesi; Jerome Hinstin
- Edited by: Jean-Luc Godard; Jean-Pierre Gorin
- Release dates: 27 February 1971 (West Germany); 29 April 1971 (Italy)
- Running time: 62 minutes
- Country: Italy
- Language: Italian

Struggle in Italy (Original title: Lotte in Italia) is an Italian-language drama film written and directed by Jean-Luc Godard and Jean-Pierre Gorin that was released in 1971.

== Synopsis ==
Lotte in Italia depicts the moment when theory meets the desperation for movement for the protagonist, Paola Taviani, whose journey makes up most of the story.

At its core, Struggle in Italia is an analysis of the political situations in Italy. The outlines the stages of Paola's transformation and how and why a supposedly revolutionary Italian girl has fallen prey to bourgeois ideology in this Class struggle.

The film is "overtly political, experimental and energetic and deliberately infuriating", the kind you don't really see being made any more.

== Production info ==
- Struggle in Italy premiered in West Germany on 27 February 1971 (TV premiere). It was released in Italy on 29 April 1971.
- The exterior scenes were filmed on locations in Milan, Lombardia, Italy, and the interior scenes in Paris, France. The factory scenes were filmed in Roubaix, France.
