= Histoire(s) du cinéma =

1998 film by Jean-Luc Godard

- An image quoted from Ingmar Bergman's movie Prison, overlapped with the text Histoire(s) du cinéma
- Directed by: Jean-Luc Godard
- Written by: Jean-Luc Godard
- Produced by: Canal+, Centre National de la Cinématographie, France 3, Gaumont, La Sept, Télévision Suisse Romande, Vega Films
- Starring: Juliette Binoche, Julie Delpy, Anne-Marie Miéville, André Malraux, Ezra Pound, Paul Celan
- Narrated by: Jean-Luc Godard
- Cinematography: Pierre Binggeli, Hervé Duhamel
- Edited by: Jean-Luc Godard
- Music by: Johann Sebastian Bach, Béla Bartók, Ludwig van Beethoven, Leonard Cohen, John Coltrane, David Darling, Bernard Herrmann, Paul Hindemith, Arthur Honegger, Giya Kancheli, György Kurtág, Franz Liszt, Gustav Mahler, Arvo Pärt, Otis Redding, Dino Saluzzi, Franz Schubert, Dmitri Shostakovich, Igor Stravinsky, Pyotr Ilyich Tchaikovsky, Anton Webern
- Distributed by: Gaumont
- Running time: 266 minutes (total)
- Countries: France; Switzerland
- Language: French

Histoire(s) du cinéma (French: [istwaʁ dy sinema]) is an eight-part video project begun by Jean-Luc Godard in the late 1980s and completed in 1998. At a total of 266 minutes, it is the longest and one of the most complex of Godard's projects. Histoire(s) du cinéma is an examination of the history of the concept of cinema and how it relates to the 20th century; in this sense, it can also be considered a critique of the 20th century and how it perceives itself. The project is widely considered Godard's magnum opus.

Histoire(s) du cinéma is always referred to in English by its French title, because of the untranslatable word play it implies: histoire means both "history" and "story," and the s in parentheses gives the possibility of a plural. Therefore, the phrase Histoire(s) du cinéma simultaneously means The History of Cinema, Histories of Cinema, The Story of Cinema and Stories of Cinema. Similar double or triple meanings, as well as puns, are a recurring motif throughout Histoire(s) and much of Godard's work.

The film was screened out of competition at the 1988 Cannes Film Festival. Nine years later, it was screened in the Un Certain Regard section at the 1997 Festival.

The soundtrack was released as a 5-CD boxed set on the ECM record label.

In 2012, it was voted the 48th greatest film of all time in a poll of film directors by Sight & Sound.

== Content ==
Histoire(s) du cinéma is conceived as a cinematic painting that brings together the elements of the novel and of painting. As cinema, it constructs into one whole three interrelated directions of enquiry: what the century has done to cinema; what cinema has done to the century; what makes up the image (cinematic or otherwise) in general. Above and beyond its scholarly dimension, Histoire(s) involves a positive project of the reinvention of cinema through the realization of Godard's earlier ideas on the history of cinema, and the cinematic modes of thought and history, along with establishing "metacinema" as a way to view the world, following Henri Bergson and Gilles Deleuze. (Note: In Cinema 2: The Time-Image, Deleuze discusses a new mode of cinema, that of thinking and memory, which deliberately rejects continuity editing popular in classical Hollywood film in favour of "irrational" so as to achieve a “co-presence of an inside deeper than any internal medium [milleu], and an outside more distant than any external medium” i.e. conceive of both the internal changes in elements such as memory without reference to any single subject and the external changes in the Bergsonian Whole that the cinema constitutes [including implied objects in the cinematic image outside (in both time and space) the set of the frame] See:Deleuze, G. (2009). Cinema, Body and Brain, Thought. In Cinema 2 the time-image (p. 218). and Río, E. D. (2017). Physics of Violence, Folds of Pain. In The grace of destruction: A vital ethology of extreme cinemas (p. 151).) At the same time, Godard seeks to push the limits of cinema in order to bring about his "videographic refashioning of cinema in the technical, ontological, and philosophical manners necessarily involves bringing cinema to its limits".

== Episodes ==
Histoire(s) du cinéma consists of four chapters, each one subdivided into two parts, making for a total of eight episodes.

- Chapter 1(a) : 51 min.
  - Toutes les histoires (1988) - All the (Hi)stories
- Chapter 1(b) : 42 min.
  - Une Histoire seule (1989) - A Single (Hi)story
- Chapter 2(a) : 26 min.
  - Seul le cinéma (1997) - Only Cinema
- Chapter 2(b) : 28 min.
  - Fatale beauté (1997) - Deadly Beauty
- Chapter 3(a) : 27 min.
  - La Monnaie de l’absolu (1998) - The Coin of the Absolute
- Chapter 3(b) : 27 min.
  - Une Vague Nouvelle (1998) - A New Wave
- Chapter 4(a) : 27 min.
  - Le Contrôle de l’univers (1998) - The Control of the Universe
- Chapter 4(b) : 38 min.
  - Les Signes parmi nous (1998) - The Signs Among Us

== Films referenced and quoted ==
Two images overlapped in Chapter 1(a): Godard at work at his typewriter, and Ida Lupino

Histoire(s) du cinéma is composed almost entirely of visual and auditory quotations from films, some famous and some obscure. The sources of referenced films and literary quotations are delineated chronologically by the film critic Céline Scemama-Heard, the author of Histoire(s) du cinéma de Jean-Luc Godard. La force faible d’un art.

This is a partial list of works Godard drew upon to create the project; a complete list would number hundreds of entries.

- An American in Paris
- The Barefoot Contessa'
- Bicycle Thieves'
- The Docks of New York
- The Fury
- The Green Ray
- A King in New York
- Man Hunt
- Marnie
- Notorious'
- The Night of the Hunter
- Only Angels Have Wings
- The Passion of Joan of Arc, which Godard had featured earlier in Vivre Sa Vie
- Rear Window
- Scarface
- Snow White and the Seven Dwarfs
- Teorema
- Zéro de conduite

== Reception ==
Critical reception for Histoire(s) du cinéma has been highly positive. Marjorie Baumgarten, reviewing for the Austin Chronicle said: "Few filmmakers would be able to mount a discourse on the 20th century's art and thought process as broad and extensive as this". Australian film critic Adrian Martin, in a four-star review, commented: "It is the form of this remembered, necessarily scrappy, haunted, sad history which Godard evokes in all the prodigious techniques of his Histoire(s) du cinéma." Calling it an "intellectual striptease", New York Times film critic Dave Kehr wrote: "Perhaps, like Joyce’s Finnegans Wake, this is not a work to be read but a work to be read in: to be picked up and put down, sampled and considered, over a period of time. Jean-Luc Godard took 30 years to compose his Histoire(s). It might take just as long to absorb it." Jonathan Rosenbaum in the Chicago Reader agreed, stating: "For better and for worse, it's comparable to James Joyce's Finnegans Wake in both its difficulty and its playfulness". In the academic journal Film Quarterly, James S. Williams described the project as "Godard’s gift to us: a threnody of love" and as offering "irrefutable proof" that "the forms of art—the forms that think—can help lay the basis for new forms of being". Alifeleti Brown, writing for Senses of Cinema, praised the series as being "Godard’s most devastating accomplishment as filmmaker/critic/artist/poet/historian". Michael Wood compared the series to an "archaeology of mind, the apparently disordered rescue of a lifetime’s memory of film" in a piece for the London Review of Books.

== Availability ==
It was released on DVD by Olive Films on December 6, 2011. In 2026, it was released by on Blu-ray by Radiance Films.

== See also ==
- The Story of Film, a 2011 documentary film by Mark Cousins similar in content
- The Tulse Luper Suitcases
- Cinephilia
- French New Wave
