= Raoul Coutard =

French cinematographer (1924–2016)

- Born: 16 September 1924; Paris, France
- Died: 8 November 2016 (aged 92); Labenne, France
- Occupations: Cinematographer, film director
- Years active: 1958–2001

Raoul Coutard (16 September 1924 – 8 November 2016) was a French cinematographer. He is best known for his connection with the French New Wave (Nouvelle Vague) period and particularly for his work with director Jean-Luc Godard, which includes Breathless (1960), A Woman Is a Woman (1961), Vivre sa vie (1962), Bande à part (1964), Alphaville, Pierrot le Fou (both 1965), and Weekend (1967). Coutard also shot films for New Wave director François Truffaut—including Shoot the Piano Player (1960) and Jules and Jim (1962)—as well as Jacques Demy, another contemporary associated with the movement.

Coutard shot over 75 films during a career that lasted nearly half a century.

== Biography ==
Coutard originally planned to study chemistry, but switched to photography because of the cost of tuition. In 1945, Coutard was sent to participate in the French Indochina War; he lived in Vietnam for the next 11 years, working as a war photographer, eventually becoming a freelancer for Paris Match and Look. In 1956, he was approached to shoot a film by Pierre Schoendoerffer, La Passe du Diable. Coutard had never used a movie camera before, and reportedly agreed to the job because of a misunderstanding (he believed he was being hired to shoot production stills of the film).

=== Collaboration with Godard ===
Coutard's first work collaboration with Jean-Luc Godard was Godard's first feature, À bout de souffle, shot in 1959. He was reportedly "imposed" on Godard by producer Georges de Beauregard; the director had already settled on a different cinematographer.

Coutard photographed nearly all of Godard's work in the Nouvelle Vague era (1959 - 1967), with the exception of Masculin, féminin; their last work during this period was Week-end (1967), which marked the end of Godard's work as a 'mainstream' filmmaker. The two did not work together again until Passion; their final collaboration was Godard's next feature, Prénom Carmen.

During the New Wave period, Coutard's work with Godard fell into two categories: black-and-white films, which were all shot in the Academy ratio, and color films, which were all shot in the "scope" widescreen aspect ratio (with the exception of La Chinoise (1967)). The black-and-white films, which were mostly shot on lower budgets, make use of hand-held camera work and natural lighting, which lends them an unpolished, documentary quality, crucial to Godard's style, second nature to Coutard. However, in interiors, natural lighting was not always sufficient, and beginning with Vivre Sa Vie (1962) Coutard devised a simple lighting rig suspended just below the ceiling with a number of small lights directed onto the ceiling, where white cards were placed to bounce maximum light in an ambient diffusion, giving the whole room of a location adequate light within which Godard could then improvise various camera set-ups. So pleased was Godard with Coutard's lighting arrangement he promptly devised a 360 degree camera pan to exploit this freedom. A similar 'documentary aesthetic' is pursued by all of Godard's cinematographers, although handheld camera tends to be replaced with more conventional mounting, in Godard's later work. Godard's first color film (shot by Coutard), Une Femme est une femme (1961), featured handheld shooting, sometimes even within its studio sets, while later ones, Le Mepris (1963) Pierrot le Fou (1965) Deux ou Trois choses que je sais d'elle (1966) Week-end (1967) tend to coincide with Godard's growing preference for longer, more conventionally mounted camera work, either in fixed frame, pans, or tracking shots. Work in the 80s and 90s becomes even more refined, consisting of elaborate tableaux or stage directions within a fixed frame, usually on a long lens, enabling abrupt and conspicuous focus pulls between background and foreground as in Passion (1982) and Prenom Carmen (1983). These were photographed by Coutard using no additional lighting whatsoever, but taking advantage of recent developments in camera lenses and film stock to press the documentary approach in striking ways.

=== Post-Nouvelle Vague Career ===
After photographing some of the last films made during the nouvelle vague era – Week-end for Godard and Truffaut's The Bride Wore Black – Coutard worked on Costa-Gavras' Z (1969). Coutard and Truffaut fought heavily over the cinematography of The Bride Wore Black, reported TCM host Robert Osborne after the cable network's 2009 showing of the film.

In 1970, Coutard wrote and directed his first feature film, Hoa Binh, for which he won the Prix Jean Vigo and an award at the 1970 Cannes Film Festival. The film was also nominated for an Academy Award for Best Foreign Language Film. Coutard shot two more features over the course of the next fifteen years: La Légion saute sur Kolwezi in 1980 and S.A.S. à San Salvador in 1983. Coutard's cinematographer on all of his features was Georges Liron, who had been his frequent camera operator during his collaboration with Godard and with whom he had served as co-cinematographer on the Irish documentary Rocky Road to Dublin (1967).

As a cinematographer, Coutard was less active in the 1970s than the 1960s. When he reunited with Godard in 1982, Coutard had shot only 7 films in the previous decade, with 5 of them in 1972–73. After the two Godard collaborations, he began working more frequently again.

During the 1990s, Coutard began working with director Philippe Garrel; his last work was Garrel's Sauvage Innocence, which was released in 2001.

== Selected filmography (as cinematographer) ==
- La Passe du Diable (The Devil's Pass) (1958)
- Ramuntcho (1959)
- Pêcheur d'Islande (Iceland Fisherman) (1959)
- À bout de souffle (Breathless) (1960)
- Tirez sur le pianiste (Shoot the Piano Player) (1960)
- Une Femme est une femme (A Woman Is a Woman) (1961)
- Vivre sa Vie: Film en Douze Tableaux (My Life to Live) (1962)
- Jules et Jim (1962)
- Portuguese Vacation (1963)
- Le petit soldat (1963)
- Le Mépris (Contempt) (1963)
- Les plus belles escroqueries du monde (The most beautiful swindles in the world) (1964)
- La Peau Douce (The Soft Skin) (1964)
- Bande à part (aka. Band of Outsiders) (1964)
- Alphaville, une étrange aventure de Lemmy Caution (Alphaville, a Strange Adventure of Lemmy Caution) (1965)
- Pierrot le Fou (Crazy Pete or Pete Goes Wild) (1965)
- La Chinoise (1967)
- Week End (1967)
- Rocky Road to Dublin (1967)
- Z (1969)
- L'Aveu (1970)
- The Most Gentle Confessions (1971)
- Five Leaf Clover (1972)
- Embassy (1972)
- The Hostage Gang (1973)
- Le Crabe-tambour (1977)
- Passion (1982)
- Prénom Carmen (1983)
- Max mon amour (Max, My Love) (1986)
- Let Sleeping Cops Lie (Ne réveillez pas un flic qui dort) (1988)

== Filmography (as director) ==
- Hoa-Binh (1970)
- Operation Leopard (1980)
- S.A.S. à San Salvador (1983)

== Filmography (as actor) ==
- Le Mépris (Contempt) (1963) – Cameraman (uncredited)
- Z (1969) – Le chirurgien anglais (uncredited) (final film role)
