= A Letter to Freddy Buache =

1982 film

- Directed by: Jean-Luc Godard
- Written by: Jean-Luc Godard
- Starring: Jean-Luc Godard
- Narrated by: Jean-Luc Godard
- Cinematography: Jean-Bernard Menoud
- Release date: May 1982
- Running time: 11 minutes
- Country: France
- Language: French

A Letter to Freddy Buache (French: Lettre à Freddy Buache) is a 1982 French short documentary film directed by Jean-Luc Godard and addressed to the Swiss film critic Freddy Buache. It was screened in the Un Certain Regard section at the 1982 Cannes Film Festival.

== See also ==
- Jean-Luc Godard filmography
