= Anne Wiazemsky =

French actress and novelist (1947–2017)

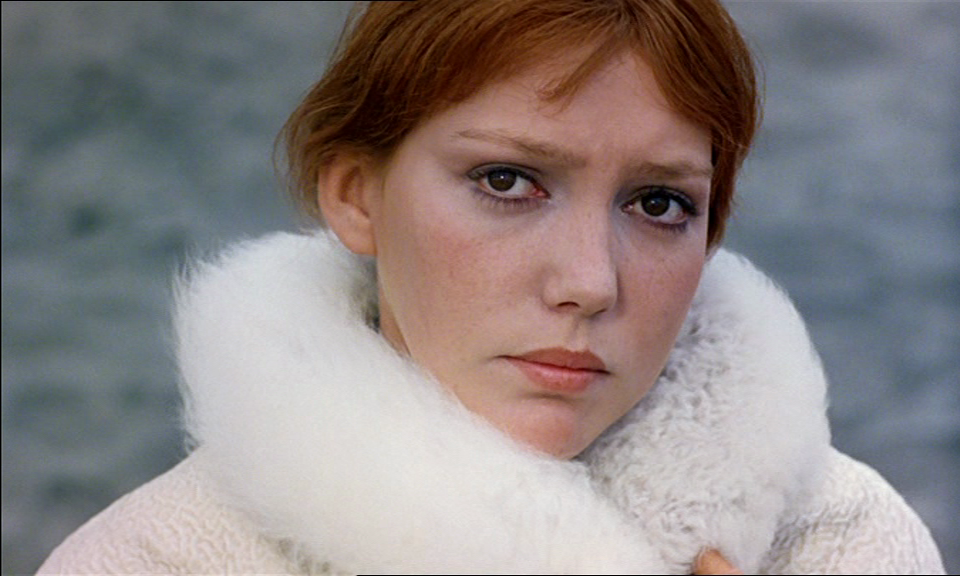
- Wiazemsky in The Seed of Man (1969)
- Born: 14 May 1947; Berlin, Germany
- Died: 5 October 2017 (aged 70); Paris, France
- Occupations: Actress; novelist
- Years active: 1966–1988
- Spouse: Jean-Luc Godard (m. 1967; div. 1979)
- Relatives: François Mauriac (maternal grandfather); Claude Mauriac (uncle)

Anne Wiazemsky (14 May 1947 – 5 October 2017) was a German-born French actress and novelist of Russian ancestry. She made her cinema debut at the age of 18, playing Marie, the lead character in Robert Bresson's Au hasard Balthazar (1966). A year later she married the director Jean-Luc Godard and appeared in several of his films, including La Chinoise (1967), Week End (1967), and One Plus One (1968).

Her maternal grandfather was the novelist and dramatist François Mauriac.

== Early life ==
Wiazemsky was born on 14 May 1947 in Berlin, Germany. Her father, Yvan Wiazemsky, a French diplomat, was a Russian prince who had emigrated to France following the Russian Revolution. Her mother, Claire Mauriac, was the daughter of François Mauriac, a winner of the Nobel Prize in Literature.

Wiazemsky spent her early years abroad following her father's postings around the world, including Geneva and Caracas; she returned to Paris in 1962. She graduated from the high school Ecole Sainte Marie de Passy in Paris.

== Career ==
=== Acting ===
Wiazemsky made her on-screen acting debut at the age of 18, playing Marie, the lead character in Robert Bresson's Au hasard Balthazar (1966) after being introduced to the director by the actress Florence Delay. The film premièred at the 1966 Venice Film Festival where it won the OCIC (International Catholic Organization for Cinema) Award, the San Giorgio Prize, and the New Cinema Award. It has been listed by critics as one of the great films of all time. Filmmaker and Cahiers du Cinéma critic Jean-Luc Godard wrote a glowing review for the film, writing that "everyone who sees this film will be absolutely astonished...because this film is really the world in an hour and a half."

Wiazemsky developed a relationship with Godard and they married in 1967. She starred in several of his films, including La Chinoise (1967), Week End (1967), and One Plus One (1968).

In the 1980s she began to write and direct. In 1994 she co-wrote the script for U.S. Go Home, directed by Claire Denis, set in 1960s France. She began to direct television documentaries.

=== Writing ===
In addition to acting, Wiazemsky wrote several novels, including Canines (1993), Une Poignée de Gens (1998), and Aux Quatre Coins du Monde (2001). Hymnes à l'Amour was filmed in 2003 as Toutes ces belles promesses (All the Fine Promises), directed by Jean-Paul Civeyrac and starring Valérie Crunchant and Bulle Ogier. Her novel Jeune Fille (2007) was based on her experience of starring in Au hasard Balthazar.

In 2015, she wrote the novel Un An Après (“One Year After”), which chronicled her time shooting Godard's film La Chinoise to when their relationship soured. It was developed into the feature film Le Redoubtable by Michel Hazanavicius.

== Personal life ==
During the 1966 filming of Au hasard Balthazar, director Robert Bresson proposed to her several times, but she refused. In 1967, she married Jean-Luc Godard and starred in several of his films; the couple separated as early as 1970, though the marriage officially ended in divorce in 1979.

In 1971, Wiazemsky signed the Manifesto of the 343, which publicly declared she had an abortion as a way to advocate for reproductive rights; the procedure was illegal in France at the time.

== Honours and awards ==
Chevalier of the Order of Legion of Honour (2009)

== Death ==
Wiazemsky died of breast cancer on 5 October 2017 at aged 70.

== Filmography ==
=== Actress (partial listing) ===
Year	Title	Role
1966	Au hasard Balthazar	Marie
1967	La Chinoise	Veronique
1967	Week End	Une fille à la femme
1968	Teorema	Odetta
1968	Les Gauloises bleues	L'infirmière
1968	One + One	Eve Democracy
1969	The Seed of Man	Dora
1969	Pigsty	Ida
1970	Wind from the East	La révolutionnaire
1971	Raphael, or The Debauched One	Diane
1971	Vladimir et Rosa	Ann
1972	Tout va bien	Leftist woman
1973	The Train	La fille-Mère
1973	George Who?	George Sand
1974	La vérité sur l'imaginaire passion d'un inconnu	Le christ-femme
1975	Die Auslieferung	Nathalie Herzen
1976	Guerres civiles en France	Elisabeth Dimitrieff
1978	Flesh Color	La vendeuse
1979	L'enfant secret	Elie
1980	Même les mômes ont du vague à l'âme	La photographe
1983	Grenouilles	Nora
1984	Rendez-vous	L'administratrice
1988	Ville étrangère	Stéphanie

== Bibliography ==
Novels

- 1989: Mon beau navire, Gallimard, Paris
- 1991: Marimé, Gallimard, Paris
- 1993: Canines, Gallimard, Paris (1993 Prix Goncourt des Lycéens)
- 1998: Une poignée de gens (1998 Grand Prix du roman de l'Académie française), Gallimard, Paris, ISBN 2-07-074676-3
- 2001: Aux quatre coins du monde, Gallimard, Paris
- 2002: Sept garçons, Gallimard, Paris
- 2004: Je m'appelle Elizabeth (Je m'appelle Élisabeth), Gallimard, Paris
- 2007: Jeune Fille, Gallimard, Paris, ISBN 2-07-077409-0
- 2009: Mon enfant de Berlin, Gallimard, Paris
- 2012: Une année studieuse, Gallimard, Paris ISBN 978-2-07-045387-0
- 2015: Un an après, Gallimard, Paris, ISBN 978-2-07-013543-1

Short stories

- 1988: Des filles bien élevées, Gallimard, Paris

Juvenile

- 2003: Les Visiteurs du soir (illustrations by Stanislas Bouvier)

Memoirs

- 1996: Hymnes à l'amour (1996 Prix Maurice Genevoix), Gallimard, Paris
- 2017: Un saint homme, Gallimard, Paris, ISBN 978-2-07-010712-4

Biography

- 1992: Album de famille
- 2000: Il était une fois... les cafés (photographs by Roger-Viollet)
- 2000: Tableaux de chats
- 2001: Venise (photographs by Jean Noël de Soye)

Preface

- 1994: En habillant
