= André S. Labarthe =

French actor (1931–2018)

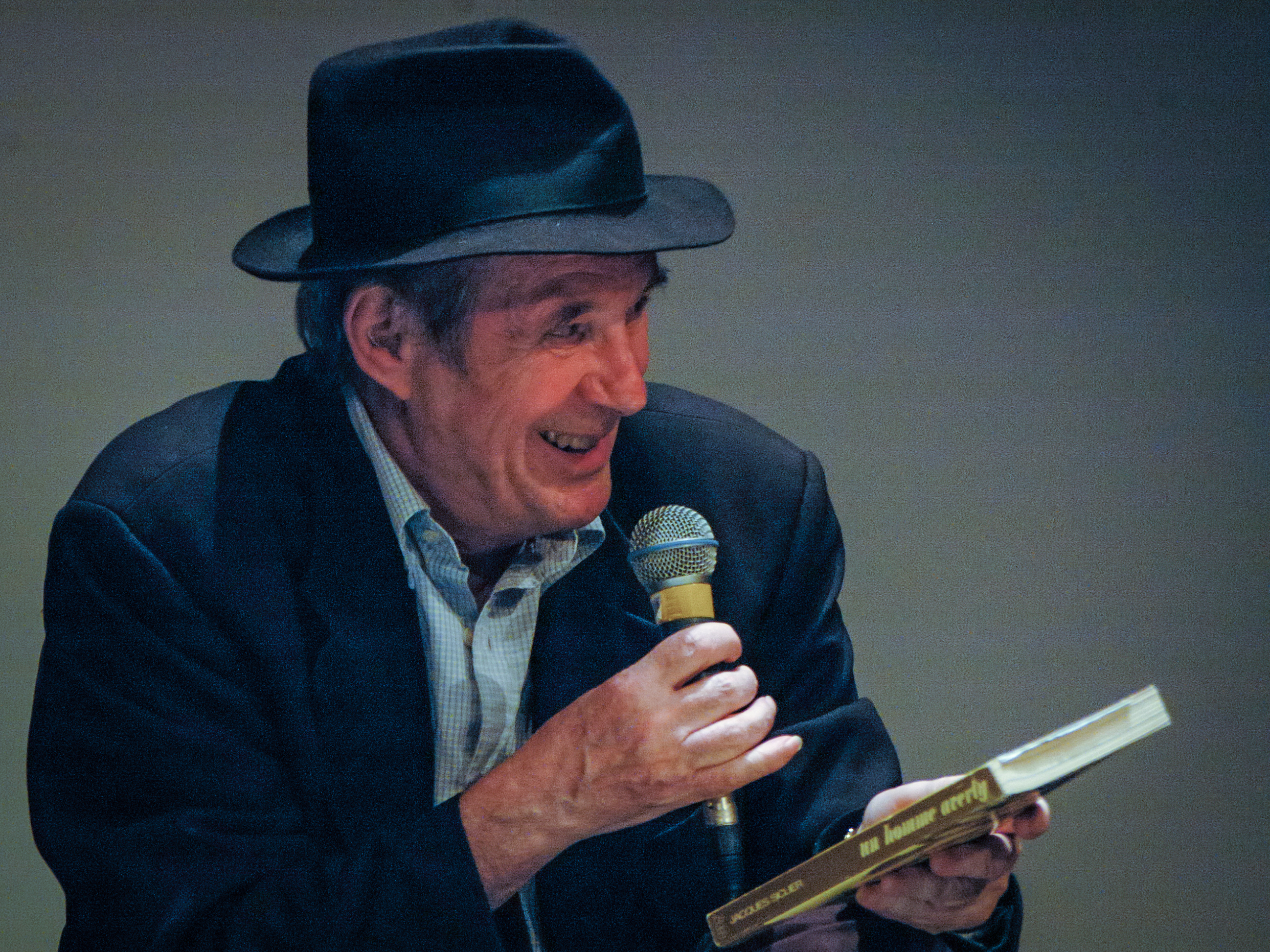
- André S. Labarthe in 2008
- Born: 18 December 1931; Oloron-Sainte-Marie, Pyrénées-Atlantiques, France
- Died: 5 March 2018 (aged 86); Paris, France
- Occupations: Actor; Film producer Film director
- Years active: 1960–2018

André S. Labarthe (18 December 1931 – 5 March 2018) was a French actor, film producer and director. He starred alongside Anna Karina in the 1962 film Vivre sa vie. He was the director of many television documentaries that profile specific individuals, beginning with Cinéastes de notre temps.

== Filmography ==
Year	Title	Role	Notes
1960	Breathless	Journalist at Orly #1	
1962	Vivre sa vie	Paul	
1969	L'amour fou	Television Director	
1978	Va voir maman, papa travaille	Le docteur	
1991	Germany Year 90 Nine Zero	Récitant	
1993	Les Enfants jouent à la Russie	Alcide Jolivet	
1995	JLG/JLG – Self-Portrait in December		
2002	Novo	L'homme au musée	
2008	Monsieur Morimoto		
2010	Turnê	Le patron du cabaret	
