= JLG/JLG – Self-Portrait in December =

1995 film

JLG/JLG - Self-Portrait in December
- Directed by: Jean-Luc Godard
- Written by: Jean-Luc Godard
- Produced by: Jean-Luc Godard
- Starring: Jean-Luc Godard
- Cinematography: Christian Jacquenod; Yves Pouliquen
- Edited by: Catherine Cormon; Jean-Luc Godard
- Release date: 8 March 1995
- Running time: 56 minutes
- Country: France
- Language: French

JLG/JLG – Self-Portrait in December (French: JLG/JLG - autoportrait de décembre, also known as JLG by JLG in the U.S.) is a 1995 French language essay film directed by Jean-Luc Godard, where Godard plays a fictionalized, aging version of himself reflecting on mortality, cinema history, and his isolated place in the world.

== Cast ==
- Jean-Luc Godard as himself
- Geneviève Pasquier
- Denis Jadót
- Brigitte Bastien
- Elisabeth Kaza
- André S. Labarthe
- Louis Seguin (as Louis Séguin)
- Bernard Eisenschitz

== Themes and style ==
The film was shot when Godard was in his 60s. A elegiac mood permeates the entire film, which captures a sense of isolation, portraying the fictionalized director as a lonely, semi-misanthropic figure working in his editing suite or wandering empty spaces. Godard’s voiceover and dialogue drift through art, literature, music, history, and clips/soundtracks from admired peers like Nicholas Ray and Roberto Rossellini. Godard playfully Intersperses among the gloom with moments of deadpan humor, interactions with domestic staff, and sharp jabs at his critics.

Stephen Holden in his New York Times review, said: ""J. L. G. by J. L. G." is more direct in its nostalgia for a vanishing high art tradition than "Germany Year 90 Nine Zero." The camera lingers lovingly over the great books lining the shelves of the director's library. Culture has become the rule, a language everyone speaks, he declares. Art is the exception of which no one speaks. Not unlike Woody Allen in his more wistful moments, the director recites a list of sacred artistic names: Dostoyevsky, Antonioni, Vigo, Cezanne, Vermeer, Mozart."

== Home media ==
This film is released by Radiance Films in a 3-disc blu-ray box set.
