= How's it going =

1976 film by Jean Luc Godard

Comment ça va
- Still from the film Comment ça va, Odette is talking on the telephone
- Directed by: Jean-Luc Godard; Anne-Marie Miéville
- Written by: Jean-Luc Godard; Anne-Marie Miéville
- Produced by: Jean-Luc Godard; Anne-Marie Miéville; Georges de Beauregard
- Starring: Anne-Marie Miéville; Michel Marot
- Cinematography: William Lubtchansky
- Production companies: Bela Productions; Institut National de l'Audiovisuel; Société Nouvelle de Cinématographie; Sonimage
- Release date: 21 May 1976 (Cannes); April 26, 1978 (France)
- Running time: 78 minutes
- Country: France
- Language: French

How's It Going (Original French title: Comment ça va) is a French film directed by Jean-Luc Godard and Anne-Marie Miéville in 1975, released at the Cannes Film Festival in 1976 and then in French cinemas in 1978. It is the third film made by the couple that year, marking their move from Paris to Grenoble.

Stemming from a discussion Godard had with journalists from the newspaper Libération, it develops the aesthetic discourse on photographic images that the Franco-Swiss director had begun in Letter to Jane (Lettre à Jane; 1972).

== Plot ==
A young factory worker is in a car with his girlfriend, Odette, a secretary at a printing press working for the French Communist Party. The young man's father, a trade unionist and party member, needs Odette's help as he prepares a video about the printing press as a means of communication.

While looking at the images, they have an animated discussion about the choices and ask each other “how's it going in France?”. The worker dictates text to accompany a photo taken in Portugal during strikes following the fall of the dictatorship, intended for political propaganda. Odette proposes using another strike photo from a few years prior, showing an exasperated worker grabbing a policeman by the neck. She eventually convinces the unionist to set aside the Portuguese photo, too loaded with symbols and iconographically linked to other images of raised hands, from Adolf Hitler to Mick Jagger.

In alternating sequences, we see Odette and her boyfriend at home, reading the papers at breakfast or watching a football match on television.

Persuaded by Odette, the unionist resumes his critique of the information system in which the Communist Party is also stuck, but when he presents his proposal to the central committee, it is rejected.

The son, after receiving a letter from his father talking about love, but also information issues, leaves to go work at the factory. The unionist will never see Odette again.

== Details ==
Technical Details	
Title	Comment ça va
Direction	Jean-Luc Godard; Anne-Marie Miéville
Screenplay	Jean-Luc Godard; Anne-Marie Miéville
Cinematography	William Lubtchansky
Video	Gérard Teissèdre
Actors	Christian Fenouillat; Catherine Floriet
Production	Jean-Luc Godard; Anne-Marie Miéville; Georges de Beauregard
Production Companies	Sonimage; Bela; Société nouvelle de cinématographie
Country of Origin	France
Format	Color - Mono - 35mm
Genre	Political film
Runtime	78 minutes
Release Date	France: May 21, 1976 (Cannes Film Festival 1976, Perspectives of French Cinema); April 26, 1978 (national release)

== Production ==
The idea for the film was born in Paris, in the offices of the newspaper Libération, when, in mid-September 1975, Godard was discussing with about ten editors a photo published in the press: it was the black and white snapshot contained in a report on the Carnation Revolution that had overthrown fascism in Portugal the previous April. A citizen and a soldier both raise their clenched fists, standing across from each other during the July strikes. Godard compares this photo with an image taken during a factory strike in Saint-Brieuc in 1972. Later, in October, he returned to the headquarters of Libération and also to the editorial offices of Le Parisien to shoot a few scenes.

The first act is the observation that television has won the war against cinema, and that as a result everything goes faster: "We go slower, we have to break it down," says Miéville's voice, and again: "Starting from an image, from a single one, like an atom, to see how it moves and how it all is."
