= A Story of Water =

- poster
- Directed by: Jean-Luc Godard; François Truffaut
- Written by: François Truffaut
- Produced by: Pierre Braunberger
- Starring: Jean-Claude Brialy; Caroline Dim
- Narrated by: Caroline Dim
- Cinematography: Michel Latouche
- Edited by: Jean-Luc Godard
- Production company: Les Films de la Pléiade
- Distributed by: Unidex
- Release date: March 3, 1961 (France)
- Running time: 12 minutes
- Language: French

A Story of Water (French: Une histoire d'eau) is a short film directed and written by Jean-Luc Godard and François Truffaut and released in 1961. It recounts the story of a woman's trip to Paris, which is surrounded by a large flooded area. It was first shown publicly in 1961. The title is a pun on the title of the erotic novel Une histoire d'O. The film was shot in two days. The film is dedicated to Mack Sennett.

According to film critic David Edelstein, introducing the film's presentation on TCM.com, Truffaut's screenplay was a "slight but reasonably coherent romance" which was altered significantly in the editing room by Godard, who added absurdist voiceovers and percussion music while cutting out most of the plot.

The film is included as a supplement on Criterion's DVD/Blu-ray release of Truffaut's The Last Metro.

== See also ==
- List of avant-garde films of the 1960s
