= Les Enfants jouent à la Russie =

- Directed by: Jean-Luc Godard
- Produced by: Ruth Waldburger
- Starring: László Szabó; Jean-Luc Godard
- Cinematography: Caroline Champetier
- Production companies: Vega Film; JLG Films
- Release date: 1993
- Running time: 60 minutes
- Country: France
- Languages: French; English; Russian

Les Enfants jouent à la Russie (English: The Kids Play Russian) is a 1993 French film directed by Jean-Luc Godard and starring László Szabó and Godard. Szabó plays a Hollywood producer who hires a famous French filmmaker (Godard) to make a documentary about post-Cold War Russia. Instead, the filmmaker stays in France and casts himself in the lead role of Fyodor Dostoyevsky's The Idiot.

== Cast ==
- László Szabó as Jack Valenti, the producer
- Jean-Luc Godard as Prince Mishkin, the idiot
- Bernard Eisenschitz as Harry Blount
- André S. Labarthe as Alcide Jolivet
- Aude Amiot as Mademoiselle Amiel
- Bénédicte Loyen
