= Jean-Luc Godard =

French and Swiss film director (1930–2022)

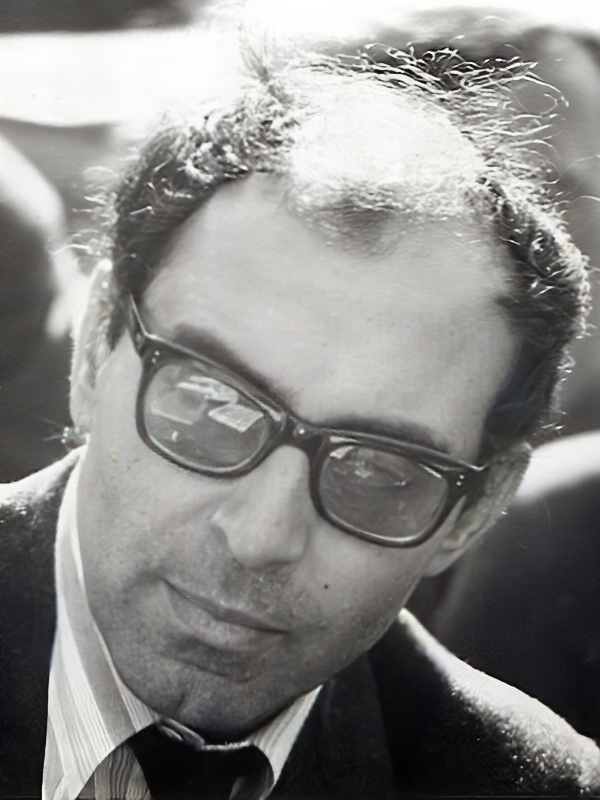
- Godard in 1968
- Born: 3 December 1930; Paris, France
- Died: 13 September 2022 (aged 91); Rolle, Vaud, Switzerland
- Citizenship: France; Switzerland
- Education: Lycée Buffon
- Occupations: Film director; screenwriter; film critic
- Years active: 1950–2022
- Movement: French New Wave
- Spouses: Anna Karina (m. 1961; div. 1965) Anne Wiazemsky (m. 1967; div. 1979)
- Partner: Anne-Marie Miéville (1978–2022; his death)
- Relatives: Pedro Pablo Kuczynski (cousin); Alex Kuczynski (cousin once removed)

Jean-Luc Godard (UK: /ˈɡɒdɑː/ GOD-ar, US: /ɡoʊˈdɑːr/ goh-DAR; French: [ʒɑ̃ lyk ɡɔdaʁ]; 3 December 1930 – 13 September 2022) was a French and Swiss film director, screenwriter, and film critic. He rose to prominence as a pioneer of the French New Wave film movement of the 1960s, alongside such filmmakers as François Truffaut, Agnès Varda, Éric Rohmer and Jacques Demy. He was arguably the most influential French filmmaker of the post-war era. According to AllMovie, his work "revolutionized the motion picture form" through its experimentation with narrative, continuity, sound, and camerawork.

During his early career as a film critic for Cahiers du Cinéma, Godard criticized mainstream French cinema's "Tradition of Quality" and championed Hollywood directors like Alfred Hitchcock and Howard Hawks. In response, he and like-minded critics began to make their own films, challenging the conventions of traditional Hollywood in addition to French cinema. Godard first received global acclaim for Breathless (1960), a milestone in the New Wave movement. His work makes use of frequent homages and references to film history, and often expressed his political views; he was an avid reader of existentialism and Marxist philosophy, and in 1969 formed the Dziga Vertov Group with other radical filmmakers to promote political works. After the New Wave, his politics were less radical, and his later films came to be about human conflict and artistic representation "from a humanist rather than Marxist perspective." He explained that "As a critic, I thought of myself as a film-maker. Today I still think of myself as a critic, and in a sense I am, more than ever before. Instead of writing criticism, I make a film, but the critical dimension is subsumed."

Godard was married three times, to actresses Anna Karina and Anne Wiazemsky, both of whom starred in several of his films, and later to his longtime partner Anne-Marie Miéville. His collaborations with Karina in Vivre sa vie (1962), Bande à part (1964) and Pierrot le Fou (1965) were called "arguably the most influential body of work in the history of cinema" by Filmmaker magazine. In a 2002 Sight & Sound poll, Godard ranked third in the critics' top ten directors of all time.

He is said to have "generated one of the largest bodies of critical analysis of any filmmaker since the mid-twentieth century." His work has been central to narrative theory and has "challenged both commercial narrative cinema norms and film criticism's vocabulary." In 1987 and 1998, he was honoured with two Honorary César and received the Praemium Imperiale in 2002. In 2010, Godard was awarded an Academy Honorary Award. He was known for his aphorisms, such as "All you need to make a movie is a girl and a gun" and "A film consists of a beginning, a middle and an end, though not necessarily in that order." Some critics have claimed that Godard's films contain prevailing themes of misogyny and sexism towards women. Feminist film theorist Laura Mulvey, has agreed that "While trying to decode a deep-seated, but interesting, misogyny, I came to think that Godard's cinema knows its own entrapment...for feminist curiosity, it is still a goldmine."

== Early life ==
Jean-Luc Godard was born on 3 December 1930 in the 7th arrondissement of Paris, the son of Odile (née Monod) and Paul Godard, a Swiss physician. His wealthy parents came from Protestant families of Franco–Swiss descent, and his mother was the daughter of Julien Monod, a founder of the Banque Paribas. She was the great-granddaughter of theologian Adolphe Monod. Other relatives on his mother's side include composer Jacques-Louis Monod, naturalist Théodore Monod and pastor Frédéric Monod. Four years after Jean-Luc's birth, his father moved the family to Switzerland. At the outbreak of the Second World War, Godard was in France, and returned to Switzerland with difficulty. He spent most of the war in Switzerland, although his family made clandestine trips to his grandfather's estate on the French side of Lake Geneva. Godard attended school in Nyon, Switzerland.

Not a frequent film-goer, he attributed his introduction to cinema to a reading of André Malraux's essay Outline of a Psychology of Cinema and the La Revue du cinéma, which was relaunched in 1946. In 1946, he went to study at the Lycée Buffon in Paris and, through family connections, mixed with members of its cultural elite. He lodged with the writer Jean Schlumberger. Having failed his baccalauréat exam in 1948, he returned to Switzerland. He studied in Lausanne and lived with his parents, whose marriage was breaking up. He spent time in Geneva also with a group that included another film fanatic, Roland Tolmatchoff, and the extreme rightist philosopher Jean Parvulesco. His elder sister Rachel encouraged him to paint, which he did, in an abstract style. After time spent at a boarding school in Thonon to prepare for the retest, which he passed, he returned to Paris in 1949. He registered for a certificate in anthropology at the University of Paris (Sorbonne), but did not attend class.

== Early career (1950–1959) ==
=== Film criticism ===
In Paris, in the Latin Quarter just prior to 1950, ciné-clubs (film societies) were gaining prominence. Godard began attending these clubs—the Cinémathèque Française, Ciné-Club du Quartier Latin (CCQL), Work and Culture ciné club, and others—which became his regular haunts. The Cinémathèque was founded by Henri Langlois and Georges Franju in 1936; Work and Culture was a workers' education group for which André Bazin had organized wartime film screenings and discussions and which had become a model for the film clubs that had risen throughout France after the Liberation; CCQL, founded in about 1947 or 1948, was animated and intellectually led by Maurice Schérer. At these clubs he met fellow film enthusiasts including Claude Chabrol and François Truffaut. Godard was part of a generation for whom cinema took on a special importance. He said: "In the 1950s cinema was as important as bread—but it isn't the case anymore. We thought cinema would assert itself as an instrument of knowledge, a microscope... a telescope.... At the Cinémathèque I discovered a world which nobody had spoken to me about. They'd told us about Goethe, but not Dreyer. ... We watched silent films in the era of talkies. We dreamed about film. We were like Christians in the catacombs."

His foray into films began in the field of criticism. Along with Maurice Schérer (writing under the to-be-famous pseudonym Éric Rohmer) and Jacques Rivette, he founded the short-lived film journal La Gazette du cinéma, which saw the publication of five issues in 1950. When Bazin co-founded the influential critical magazine Cahiers du Cinéma in 1951 (a seminal publication on cinema and its main observers and participants), Godard was the first of the younger critics from the CCQL/Cinémathèque group to be published. The January 1952 issue featured his review of an American melodrama directed by Rudolph Maté, No Sad Songs for Me. His "Defence and Illustration of Classical Découpage" published in September 1952, in which he attacks an earlier article by Bazin and defends the use of the shot–reverse shot technique, is one of his earliest important contributions to cinema criticism. Praising Otto Preminger and "the greatest American artist—Howard Hawks", Godard raises their harsh melodramas above the more "formalistic and overtly artful films of Welles, De Sica, and Wyler which Bazin endorsed". At this point Godard's activities did not include making films. Rather, he watched films, and wrote about them, and helped others make films, notably Rohmer, with whom he worked on Présentation ou Charlotte et son steak.

=== Filmmaking ===
Having left Paris in the fall of 1952, Godard returned to Switzerland and went to live with his mother in Lausanne. He became friendly with his mother's lover, Jean-Pierre Laubscher, who was a labourer on the Grande Dixence Dam. Through Laubscher he secured work himself as a construction worker at the Plaz Fleuri work site at the dam. He saw the possibility of making a documentary film about the dam; when his initial contract ended, to prolong his time at the dam, he moved to the post of telephone switchboard operator. While on duty, in April 1954, he put through a call to Laubscher which relayed the fact that Odile Monod, Godard's mother, had died in a scooter accident. Thanks to Swiss friends who lent him a 35 mm movie camera, he was able to shoot on 35mm film. He rewrote the commentary that Laubscher had written, and gave his film a rhyming title Opération béton (Operation Concrete). The company that administered the dam bought the film and used it for publicity purposes.

As he continued to work for Cahiers, he made Une femme coquette (1955), a 10-minute short, in Geneva; and in January 1956 he returned to Paris. A plan for a feature film of Goethe's Elective Affinities proved too ambitious and came to nothing. Truffaut enlisted his help to work on an idea he had for a film based on the true-crime story of a petty criminal, Michel Portail, who had shot a motorcycle policeman and whose girlfriend had turned him in to the police, but Truffaut failed to interest any producers. Another project with Truffaut, a comedy about a country girl arriving in Paris, was also abandoned. He worked with Rohmer on a planned series of short films centering on the lives of two young women, Charlotte and Véronique; and in the autumn of 1957, Pierre Braunberger produced the first film in the series, All the Boys Are Called Patrick, directed by Godard from Rohmer's script. A Story of Water (1958) was created largely out of unused footage shot by Truffaut. In 1958, Godard, with a cast that included Jean-Paul Belmondo and Anne Colette, made his last short before gaining international prominence as a filmmaker, Charlotte et son Jules, an homage to Jean Cocteau. The film was shot in Godard's hotel room on the rue de Rennes and apparently reflected something of the 'romantic austerity' of Godard's own life at this time. His Swiss friend Roland Tolmatchoff noted: "In Paris he had a big Bogart poster on the wall and nothing else." In December 1958, Godard reported from the Festival of Short Films in Tours and praised the work of, and became friends with Jacques Demy, Jacques Rozier and Agnès Varda—he already knew Alain Resnais whose entry he praised—but Godard now wanted to make a feature film. He travelled to the 1959 Cannes Film Festival and asked Truffaut to let him use the story on which they had collaborated in 1956, about car thief Michel Portail. He sought money from producer Georges de Beauregard, whom he had met previously while working briefly in the publicity department of Twentieth Century Fox's Paris office, and who was also at the Festival. Beauregard could offer his expertise, but was in debt from two productions based on Pierre Loti stories; hence, financing came instead from a film distributor, René Pignières.

== New Wave (1960–1967) ==
=== Breathless ===
Godard's Breathless (À bout de souffle, 1960), starring Jean-Paul Belmondo and Jean Seberg, distinctly expressed the French New Wave's style, and incorporated quotations from several elements of popular culture—specifically American film noir. It was based on a story suggested by François Truffaut. The film employed various techniques such as the innovative use of jump cuts (which were traditionally considered amateurish), character asides and breaking the eyeline match in continuity editing. Another unique aspect of Breathless was the spontaneous writing of the script on the day of shooting—a technique that the actors found unsettling—which contributed to the spontaneous, documentary-like ambiance of the film.

From the beginning of his career, Godard included more film references in his movies than any of his New Wave colleagues. In Breathless, his citations include a movie poster showing Humphrey Bogart (from his last film, The Harder They Fall), whose expression Belmondo tries reverently to imitate—visual quotations from the films of Ingmar Bergman, Samuel Fuller, Fritz Lang and others; and an onscreen dedication to Monogram Pictures, an American B-movie studio. Quotations from, and references to, literature include William Faulkner, Dylan Thomas, Louis Aragon, Rainer Maria Rilke, Françoise Sagan and Maurice Sachs. The film also contains citations to composers (J. S. Bach, Mozart) and painters (Picasso, Paul Klee and Auguste Renoir).

Godard wanted to hire Seberg, who was living in Paris with her husband François Moreuil, a lawyer, to play the American woman. Seberg had become famous in 1956 when Otto Preminger had chosen her to play Joan of Arc in his Saint Joan, and had then cast her in his 1958 adaptation of Bonjour Tristesse. Her performance in this film had not been generally regarded as a success—The New York Times's critic called her a "misplaced amateur"—but Truffaut and Godard disagreed. In the role of Michel Poiccard, Godard cast Belmondo, an actor he had already called, in Arts in 1958, "the Michel Simon and the Jules Berry of tomorrow." The cameraman was Raoul Coutard, choice of the producer Beauregard. Godard wanted Breathless to be shot like a documentary, with a lightweight handheld camera and a minimum of added lighting; Coutard had experience as a documentary cameraman while working for the French army's information service during the French-Indochina War. Tracking shots were filmed by Coutard from a wheelchair pushed by Godard. Though Godard had prepared a traditional screenplay, he dispensed with it and wrote the dialogue day by day as the production went ahead. The film's importance was recognized immediately, and in January 1960 Godard won the Jean Vigo Prize, awarded "to encourage an auteur of the future". One reviewer mentioned Alexandre Astruc's prophecy of the age of the caméra-stylo, the camera that a new generation would use with the efficacy with which a writer uses his pen—"here is in fact the first work authentically written with a caméra-stylo". Richard Brody writes: "After Breathless, anything artistic appeared possible in the cinema. The film moved at the speed of the mind and seemed, unlike anything that preceded it, a live recording of one person thinking in real time." Phillip Lopate wrote that "It seemed a new kind of storytelling, with its saucy jump cuts, digressions, quotes, in jokes and addresses to the viewer."

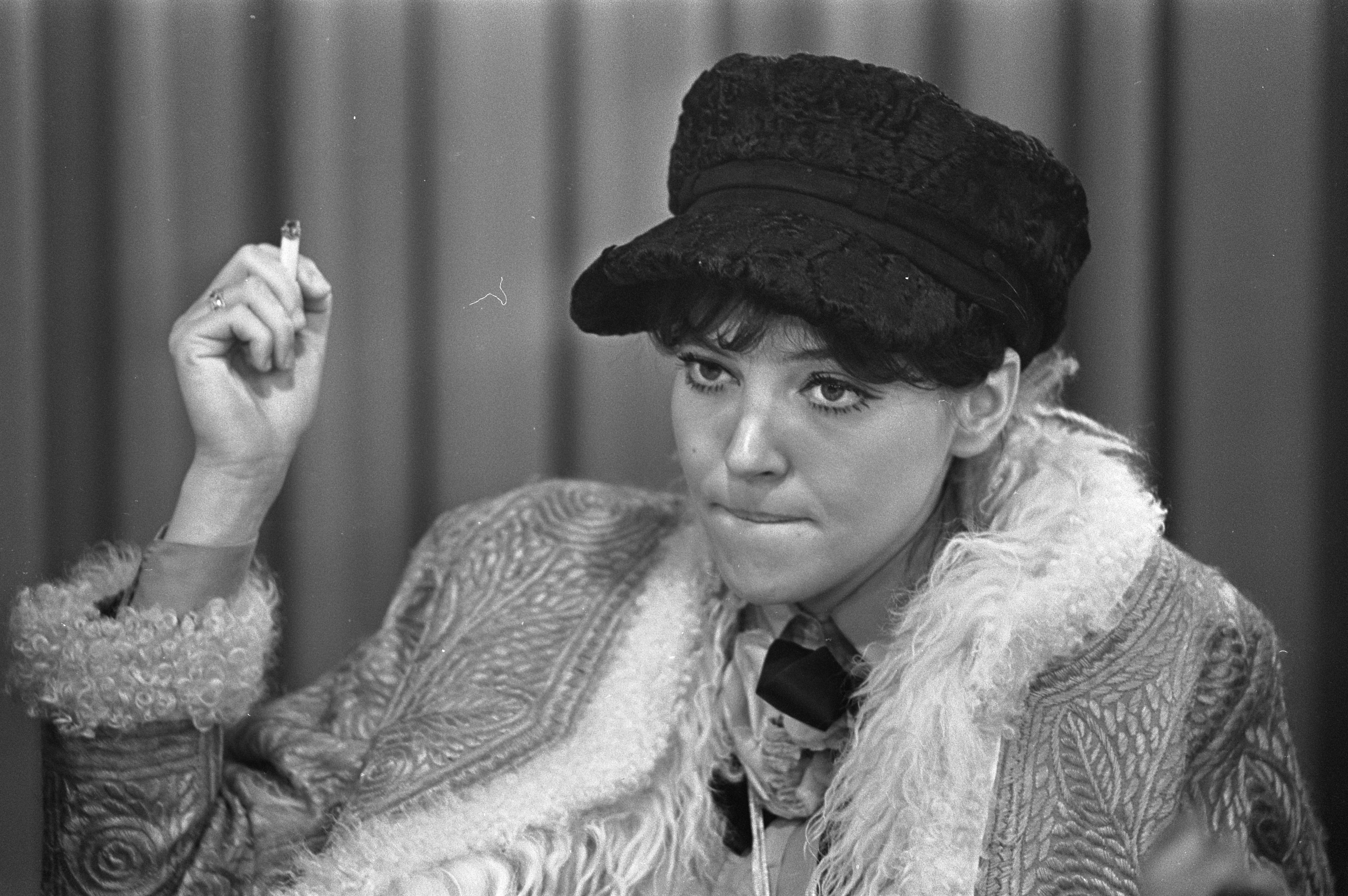
Anna Karina, having rejected a role in Breathless, appeared in the next film shot by Godard, Le petit soldat (The Little Soldier), which concerned France's war in Algeria.

=== Early work with Anna Karina ===
In 1960 Godard shot Le petit soldat (The Little Soldier). The cast included Godard's future wife Anna Karina. At this time Karina had virtually no experience as an actress. Godard used her awkwardness as an element of her performance. Godard and Karina were a couple by the end of the shoot. She appeared again, along with Belmondo, in Godard's first colour film, A Woman Is a Woman (1961), their first project to be released. The film was intended as an homage to the American musical. Adjustments that Godard made to the original version of the story gave it autobiographical resonances, "specifically in regard to his relationship with Anna Karina." The film revealed "the confinement within the four walls of domestic life" and "the emotional and artistic fault lines that threatened their relationship".

=== Vivre sa vie ===
Godard's next film, Vivre sa vie (My Life to Live, 1962), was one of his most popular among critics. Karina starred as Nana, an errant mother and aspiring actress whose financially strained circumstances lead her to the life of a streetwalker. It is an episodic account of her rationalizations to prove she is free, even though she is tethered at the end of her pimp's short leash. In one scene, within a café, she spreads her arms out and announces she is free to raise or lower them as she wishes.

The film was a popular success and led to Columbia Pictures giving him a deal where he would be provided with $100,000 to make a movie, with complete artistic control.

=== Le petit soldat and Les Carabiniers ===
Godard had started production on Le petit soldat immediately after completing Breathless, before it was released, because he felt his first film was too experimental for audiences and feared he would not be able to obtain funding for future films if Breathless turned out unsuccessful. It dealt with the Algerian War of Independence and was censored by the French government for the next two years due to its political nature, releasing only in 1963 as one of his three films that year. The 'little soldier' Bruno Forestier was a character close to Godard himself, an image-maker and intellectual, 'more or less my spokesman, but not totally' Godard told an interviewer.

The film begins on 13 May 1958, the date of the attempted putsch in Algeria, and ends later the same month. In the film, Bruno Forestier, a photojournalist who has links with a right-wing paramilitary group working for the French government, is ordered to murder a professor accused of aiding the Algerian resistance. He is in love with Veronica Dreyer, a young woman who has worked with the Algerian fighters. He is captured by Algerian militants and tortured. His organization captures and tortures her. In making Le petit soldat, Godard took the unusual step of writing dialogue every day and calling the lines to the actors during filming – a technique made possible by filming without direct sound and dubbing dialogue in post-production.

The inclusion of the Algerian war was not politically motivated in the sense of Godard being very politicized at the time, or interested in the war, but done out of an instinct of making films nobody else was making at the time. He later called Le petit soldat his "most fascist film" and expressed surprise and regret at having been able to express "reactionary" ideas in his work.

His following film was Les Carabiniers, based on a story by Roberto Rossellini, one of Godard's influences. The film follows two peasants who join the army of a king, only to find futility in the whole thing as the king reveals the deception of war-administrating leaders.

=== Contempt ===
His final film of 1963, and the most commercially successful of his career, was Le Mépris (Contempt), starring Michel Piccoli and one of France's biggest female stars, Brigitte Bardot. The film follows Paul (Piccoli), a screenwriter who is commissioned by Prokosch (Jack Palance), an arrogant American movie producer, to rewrite the script for an adaptation of Homer's Odyssey, directed by Austrian director Fritz Lang (playing himself). Lang's 'high culture' interpretation of the story is lost on Prokosch, whose character is a firm indictment of the commercial motion picture hierarchy.

=== Anouchka Films ===
In 1964, Godard and Karina formed a production company, Anouchka Films. He directed Bande à part (Band of Outsiders), also starring Karina and described by Godard as "Alice in Wonderland meets Franz Kafka." It follows two young men, looking to score on a heist, who both fall in love with Karina, and quotes from several gangster film conventions. While promoting the film, Godard wrote that according to D. W. Griffith, all one needs to make a film is "a girl and a gun."

Une femme mariée (A Married Woman, 1964) followed Band of Outsiders. It was a slow, deliberate, toned-down black-and-white picture without a real story. The film was shot in four weeks and was "an explicitly and stringently modernist film". It showed Godard's "engagement with the most advanced thinking of the day, as expressed in the work of Claude Lévi-Strauss and Roland Barthes" and its fragmentation and abstraction reflected also "his loss of faith in the familiar Hollywood styles."

In 1965, Godard directed Alphaville, a blend of science fiction, film noir and satire. Eddie Constantine starred as Lemmy Caution, a detective who is sent into a city controlled by a giant computer named Alpha 60. His mission is to make contact with Professor von Braun (Howard Vernon), a famous scientist who has fallen mysteriously silent, and is believed to be suppressed by the computer. Alphaville is notable for depicting a science-fiction story in absence of any specially constructed set; the film takes place in contemporary 1960s Paris, and all science-fiction aspects are suggested through dialogue, cinematography and editing.

His next film was Pierrot le Fou (1965). Gilles Jacob, an author, critic and president of the Cannes Film Festival, called it both a "retrospective" and recapitulation. He solicited the participation of Belmondo, by then a famous actor, to guarantee the necessary amount of funding for the expensive film. Godard said the film was "connected with the violence and loneliness that lie so close to happiness today. It's very much a film about France." The film featured American director Samuel Fuller as himself.

Masculin Féminin (1966), based on two Guy de Maupassant stories, La Femme de Paul and Le Signe, was a study of contemporary French youth and their involvement with cultural politics. An intertitle provides the famous alternative title of the film: "The children of Marx and Coca-Cola." Although Godard's cinema is sometimes thought to depict a wholly masculine point of view, Phillip John Usher has demonstrated how the film, by the way it connects images and disparate events, seems to blur gender lines. Godard has later rebutted accusations of misogyny in his early films, especially Masculin Feminin and Le petit soldat:

I had no idea what to have the girl say and I didn’t even realise it. Today if I had to have a female character speak in a film I wouldn’t know how, I would prefer to present it in the form of an interview so he could answer on an equal footing, or tell me that she doesn’t want to answer or something like that. [...] Some of the things said about women are quite harsh. They’re completely imbecilic remarks, which come from me also. But I don’t really feel like the guilty party. [...] What I try to do is to organise a room or machinery or production space where, if she felt like it, she could contribute. Because in cinema I’ve seen that women can’t contribute simply because they are terrorised by the way men have organised the machinery.

Godard followed with Made in U.S.A (1966), the source material for which was Richard Stark's The Jugger. A classic New Wave crime thriller, it was inspired by American Noir films. Karina stars as the anti-hero searching for her murdered lover and the film includes a cameo by Marianne Faithfull. A year later came Two or Three Things I Know About Her (1967), filmed at the same time as Made in U.S.A., in which Marina Vlady portrays a woman leading a double life as housewife and prostitute, considered to be "among the greatest achievements in filmmaking."

La Chinoise (1967) saw Godard at his most politically forthright so far. The film focused on a group of students and engaged with the ideas coming out of the student activist groups in contemporary France. Released just before the May 1968 events, the film is thought by some to have foreshadowed the student rebellions that took place.

=== Week End ===
That same year, Godard made a more colourful and political film, Week End. It follows a Parisian couple as they leave on a weekend trip across the French countryside to collect an inheritance. What ensues is a confrontation with the tragic flaws of the over-consuming bourgeoisie. The film contains an eight-minute tracking shot of the couple stuck in an unremitting traffic jam as they leave the city, cited as a technique Godard used to deconstruct bourgeois trends. Startlingly, a few shots contain extra footage from, as it were, before the beginning of the take (while the actors are preparing) and after the end of the take (while the actors are coming out of character). Week End's enigmatic and audacious end title sequence, which reads "End of Cinema", appropriately marked an end to the narrative and cinematic period in Godard's filmmaking career.

== Political period (1968–1979) ==
Godard was known for his "highly political voice", and regularly featured political content in his films. One of his earliest features, Le petit soldat, which dealt with the Algerian War of Independence, was notable for its attempt to present the complexity of the dispute; the film was perceived as equivocating and as drawing a "moral equivalence" between the French forces and the National Liberation Front. Along these lines, Les Carabiniers presents a fictional war that is initially romanticized in the way its characters approach their service, but becomes a stiff anti-war metonym. In addition to the international conflicts to which Godard sought an artistic response, he was also very concerned with the social problems in France. The earliest and best example of this is Karina's potent portrayal of a prostitute in Vivre sa vie. In 1960s Paris, the political milieu was not overwhelmed by one specific movement. There was, however, a distinct post-war climate shaped by various international conflicts such as colonialism in North Africa and Southeast Asia. Godard's Marxist disposition did not become abundantly explicit until La Chinoise and Week End, but is evident in several films—namely Pierrot and Une femme mariée.

Godard was accused by some of harbouring anti-Semitic views: in 2010, in the lead-up to the presentation of Godard's honorary Oscar, a prominent article in The New York Times by Michael Cieply drew attention to the idea, which had been circulating through the press in previous weeks, that Godard might be an anti-Semite, and thus undeserving of the accolade. Cieply makes reference to Richard Brody's book Everything is Cinema: The Working Life of Jean-Luc Godard, and alluded to a previous, longer article published by the Jewish Journal as lying near the origin of the debate. The article also draws upon Brody's book, for example in the following quotation, which Godard made on television in 1981: "Moses is my principal enemy...Moses, when he received the commandments, he saw images and translated them. Then he brought the texts, he didn't show what he had seen. That's why the Jewish people are accursed."

Immediately after Cieply's article was published, Brody made a clear point of criticising the "extremely selective and narrow use" of passages in his book, and noted that Godard's work approached the Holocaust with "the greatest moral seriousness". Indeed, his documentaries feature images from the Holocaust in a context suggesting he considers Nazism and the Holocaust as the nadir of human history. Godard's views become more complex regarding the State of Israel. In 1970, Godard travelled to the Middle East to make a pro-Palestinian film he did not complete and whose footage eventually became part of the 1976 film Ici et ailleurs. In this film, Godard seems to view the Palestinians' cause as one of many worldwide Leftist revolutionary movements. Elsewhere, Godard explicitly identified himself as an anti-Zionist and denied accusations of anti-Semitism.

=== Vietnam War ===
Godard produced several pieces that directly address the Vietnam War. There are two scenes in Pierrot le fou that tackle the issue. The first is a scene that takes place in the initial car ride between Ferdinand (Belmondo) and Marianne (Karina). Over the car radio, the two hear the message "garrison massacred by the Viet Cong who lost 115 men". Marianne responds with an extended musing on the way the radio dehumanises the Northern Vietnamese combatants. The war is present throughout the film in mentions, allusions, and depictions in newsreel footage, and the film's style was affected by Godard's political anger at the war, upsetting his ability to draw from earlier cinematic styles.

Notably, he also participated in Loin du Vietnam (1967). An anti-war project, it consists of seven sketches directed by Godard (who used stock footage from La Chinoise), Claude Lelouch, Joris Ivens, William Klein, Chris Marker, Alain Resnais, and Agnès Varda.

=== Bertolt Brecht ===
Godard's engagement with German poet and playwright Bertolt Brecht stems primarily from his attempt to transpose Brecht's theory of epic theatre and its prospect of alienating the viewer (Verfremdungseffekt) through a radical separation of the elements of the medium (theatre in Brecht's case, but in Godard's, film). Brecht's influence is keenly felt through much of Godard's work, particularly before 1980, when Godard used cinematic expression for specific political ends.

For example, Breathless's elliptical editing, which denies the viewer a fluid narrative typical of mainstream cinema, forces the viewers to take on more critical roles, connecting the pieces themselves and coming away with more investment in the work's content. In many of his most political pieces, specifically Week-end, Pierrot le Fou, and La Chinoise, characters address the audience with thoughts, feelings, and instructions.

=== Marxism ===
A Marxist reading is possible with most if not all of Godard's early work. Godard's direct interaction with Marxism does not become explicitly apparent, however, until La Chinoise, a film about young marxist student radicals. A constant refrain throughout Godard's cinematic period is that of the bourgeoisie's consumerism, the commodification of daily life and activity, and man's alienation—all central features of Marx's critique of capitalism.

In an essay on Godard, philosopher and aesthetics scholar Jacques Rancière states, "When in Pierrot le fou, 1965, a film without a clear political message, Belmondo played on the word 'scandal' and the 'freedom' that the Scandal girdle supposedly offered women, the context of a Marxist critique of commodification, of pop art derision at consumerism, and of a feminist denunciation of women's false 'liberation', was enough to foster a dialectical reading of the joke and the whole story." The way Godard treated politics in his cinematic period was in the context of a joke, a piece of art, or a relationship, presented to be used as tools of reference, romanticising the Marxist rhetoric, rather than being solely tools of education.

Une femme mariée is also structured around Marx's concept of commodity fetishism. Godard once said that it is "a film in which individuals are considered as things, in which chases in a taxi alternate with ethological interviews, in which the spectacle of life is intermingled with its analysis". He was very conscious of the way he wished to portray the human being. His efforts are overtly characteristic of Marx, who in his Economic and Philosophical Manuscripts of 1844 gives one of his most nuanced elaborations, analysing how the worker is alienated from his product, the object of his productive activity. Georges Sadoul, in his short rumination on the film, describes it as a "sociological study of the alienation of the modern woman".

=== Revolutionary period (1968–1979) ===
The period which spans from May 1968 into the 1970s has been given various labels—from his "militant" period, to his "radical" period, along with terms as specific as "Maoist" and as vague as "political". In any case, the period saw Godard employ consistent revolutionary rhetoric in his films and in his public statements.

Inspired by the May 68 upheaval, Godard, alongside François Truffaut, led protests that shut down the 1968 Cannes Film Festival in solidarity with the students and workers. Godard stated there was not a single film showing at the festival that represented their causes. "Not one, whether by Milos, myself, Roman or François. There are none. We're behind the times."

=== Films ===
Amid the upheavals of the late 1960s, Godard became passionate about "making political films politically." Though many of his films from 1968 to 1972 are feature-length films, they are low-budget and challenge the notion of what a film can be. In addition to abandoning mainstream filmmaking, Godard also tried to escape the cult of personality that had formed around him. He worked anonymously in collaboration with other filmmakers, most notably Jean-Pierre Gorin, with whom he formed the Dziga-Vertov cinema collective. During this period Godard made films in England, Italy, Czechoslovakia, Palestine, and the U.S., as well as France. He and Gorin toured with their work, attempting to create discussion, mainly on college campuses. This period came to a climax with the big-budget production Tout Va Bien, which starred Yves Montand and Jane Fonda. Owing to a motorcycle accident that severely incapacitated Godard, Gorin ended up directing this most celebrated of their work together almost single-handedly. As a companion piece to Tout va bien, the pair made Letter to Jane, a 50-minute "examination of a still" showing Jane Fonda visiting North Vietnam during the Vietnam War. The film is a deconstruction of Western imperialist ideology. This was the last film that Godard and Gorin made together.

In 1978 Godard was commissioned by the Mozambican government to make a short film. During this time his experience with Kodak film led him to criticise the film stock as "inherently racist" since it did not reflect the variety, nuance or complexity in dark brown or dark skin. This was because Kodak Shirley cards were only made for Caucasian subjects, a problem that was not rectified until 1995.

=== Sonimage ===
In 1972, Godard and his life partner, Swiss filmmaker, Anne-Marie Miéville started the alternative video production and distribution company Sonimage, based in Grenoble. Under Sonimage, Godard produced Comment ca va (1975), Numéro Deux (1975) and Sauve qui peut (la vie) (1980). In 1976, Godard and Miéville, his future wife, collaborated on a series of innovative video works for European broadcast television, titled Six fois deux/Sur et sous la communication (1976) and France/tour/détour/deux/enfants (1978). From the time that Godard returned to mainstream filmmaking in 1980, Anne-Marie Miéville remained an important collaborator.

=== Jean-Pierre Gorin ===
After the events of May 1968, when the city of Paris saw a total upheaval in response to the "authoritarian de Gaulle", and Godard's professional objective was reconsidered, he began to collaborate with like-minded individuals in the filmmaking arena. His most notable collaborator was Jean-Pierre Gorin, a Maoist student of Louis Althusser, Michel Foucault, and Jacques Lacan, who later became a professor of Film Studies at the University of California, San Diego, with a passion for cinema that attracted Godard's attention.

Between 1968 and 1973, Godard and Gorin collaborated to make a total of five films with strong Maoist messages. The most prominent film from the collaboration was Tout Va Bien (1972). The film starred Jane Fonda, who was, at the time, the wife of French filmmaker Roger Vadim. Fonda was at the height of her acting career, having won an Academy Award for her performance in Klute (1971), and had gained notoriety as a left-wing anti-war activist. The male lead was the legendary French singer and actor Yves Montand, who had appeared in prestigious films by Georges Clouzot, Alain Résnais, Sacha Guitry, Vincente Minnelli, George Cukor, and Costa-Gavras.

=== Dziga Vertov Group ===
The small group of Maoists that Godard had brought together, which included Gorin, adopted the name Dziga Vertov Group. Godard had a specific interest in Dziga Vertov, a Soviet filmmaker—who was known for a series of radical documentaries titled "Kino Pravda" (literally, "film truth") and the late silent-era feature film Man with a Movie Camera (1929). Vertov was also a contemporary of both Soviet montage theorists, notably Sergei Eisenstein, and Russian constructivist and avant-garde artists such as Alexander Rodchenko and Vladimir Tatlin. Part of Godard's political shift after May 1968 was toward a proactive participation in the class struggle and he drew inspiration from filmmakers associated with the Russian Revolution.

Towards the end of this period of his life, Godard began to feel disappointed with his Maoist ideals and was abandoned by his wife at the time, Anne Wiazemsky. In this context, according to biographer Antoine de Baecque, Godard attempted suicide on two occasions.

== Return to commercial films and Histoire(s) du cinéma (1980–2000) ==
Godard returned to somewhat more traditional fiction with Sauve qui peut (la vie) (1980), the first of a series of more mainstream films marked by autobiographical currents: it was followed by Passion, Lettre à Freddy Buache (both 1982), Prénom Carmen (1983), and Grandeur et décadence d'un petit commerce de cinéma (1986). There was, though, another flurry of controversy with Je vous salue, Marie (1985), which was condemned by the Roman Catholic Church for alleged heresy, and also with King Lear (1987), a postmodern production of the play by William Shakespeare. Also completed in 1987 was a segment in the film Aria which was based loosely from the plot of Armide; it is set in a gym and uses several arias by Jean-Baptiste Lully from his famous Armide.

His later films were marked by great formal beauty and frequently a sense of requiem: Nouvelle Vague (New Wave, 1990), the autobiographical JLG/JLG, autoportrait de décembre (JLG/JLG: Self-Portrait in December, 1995), and For Ever Mozart (1996). Allemagne année 90 neuf zéro (Germany Year 90 Nine Zero, 1991) which is a quasi-sequel to Alphaville, but done with an elegiac tone and focus on the inevitable decay of age. He won the Medaglia d'oro della Presidenza del Senato for the film. In 1990, Godard was presented with a special award from the National Society of Film Critics. Between 1988 and 1998, he produced the multi-part series Histoire(s) du cinéma, a monumental project which combined all the innovations of his video work with a passionate engagement in the issues of twentieth-century history and the history of film itself.

== Late period films (2001–2022) ==
In 2001, Éloge de l'amour (In Praise of Love) was released. The film is notable for its use of both film and video—the first half captured in 35 mm black and white, the latter half shot in colour on DV—and subsequently transferred to film for editing. The film is also noted for containing themes of ageing, love, separation, and rediscovery as it follows the young artist Edgar in his contemplation of a new work on the four stages of love. In Notre musique (2004), Godard turned his focus to war, specifically, the war in Sarajevo, but with attention to all war, including the American Civil War, the war between the U.S. and Native Americans, and the Israeli–Palestinian conflict. The film is structured into three Dantean kingdoms: Hell, Purgatory, and Paradise. Godard's fascination with paradox is constant in the film. It opens with a long, ponderous montage of war images that occasionally lapses into the comic; Paradise is shown as a lush wooded beach patrolled by U.S. Marines.

Godard's film Film Socialisme (2010) premiered in the Un Certain Regard section at the 2010 Cannes Film Festival. It was released theatrically in France in May 2010. Godard was rumoured to be considering directing a film adaptation of Daniel Mendelsohn's The Lost: A Search for Six of Six Million, an award-winning book about the Holocaust. In 2013, Godard released the short Les trois désastres (The Three Disasters) as part of the omnibus film 3X3D with filmmakers Peter Greenaway and Edgar Pera. 3X3D premiered at the 2013 Cannes Film Festival. His 2014 film Goodbye to Language, shot in 3-D, revolves around a couple who cannot communicate with each other until their pet dog acts as an interpreter for them. The film makes reference to a wide range of influences such as paintings by Nicolas de Staël and the writing of William Faulkner, as well as the work of mathematician Laurent Schwartz and dramatist Bertolt Brecht—one of Godard's most important influences. It was selected to compete for the Palme d'Or in the main competition section at the 2014 Cannes Film Festival, where it won the Jury Prize. Godard's non-traditional script for the film was described as a collage of handwritten text and images, and an "artwork" itself.

In 2015 J. Hoberman reported that Godard was working on a new film. Initially titled Tentative de bleu, in December 2016 Wild Bunch co-chief Vincent Maraval stated that Godard had been shooting Le livre d'image (The Image Book) for almost two years "in various Arab countries, including Tunisia" and that it is an examination of the modern Arab World."Godard presented the film at several international festivals, where it received a Special Palme d'Or at the 2018 Cannes Film Festival. Le livre d'image was first shown in May 2018 at the Cannes Film Festival, and later released more widely in November 2018. On 4 December 2019, an art installation piece created by Godard opened at the Fondazione Prada in Milan. Titled Le Studio d'Orphée, the installation is a recreated workspace and includes editing equipment, furniture, and other materials used by Godard in post-production.

In 2020, Godard told Les Inrockuptibles that his new film would be about a Yellow vest protestor, and indicated that along with archival footage "there will also be a shoot. I don't know if I will find what are called actors...I would like to film the people we see on news channels but by plunging them into a situation where documentary and fiction come together." In March 2021 he said that he was working on two new films during a virtual interview at the International Film Festival of Kerala. Godard stated "I'm finishing my movie life — yes, my moviemaker life — by doing two scripts...After, I will say, 'Goodbye, cinema.'"

In July 2021, cinematographer and long time collaborator Fabrice Aragno said that work on the films was going slowly and Godard was more focused on "books, on the ideas of the film, and less in the making." Godard suggested making a film like Chris Marker's La Jetée to "come back to his origin." Much of the film would be shot on 35mm, 16mm and 8mm film, but the expense of celluloid film stock and the COVID-19 pandemic stalled production. Aragno expected to shoot test footage that fall. He added that the second film was for the Arte channel in France. The first of the two films, a 20-minute short titled Trailer of the Film That Will Never Exist: "Phony Wars", premiered at the 2023 Cannes Film Festival, in collaboration with St. Laurent. The second and final posthumous short, Scenarios, left unfinished at the time of Godard's death, was finished by Aragno and Jean-Paul Battagia and will have its world premiere at the 2024 Cannes Film Festival.

Aragno said that he did not think that either film would be Godard's last film, adding "I say this often that Éloge de l'amour was the beginning of his last gesture. These five, or six or seven films are connected to each other in a way, they're not just full stops. It's not just one painting."

== Personal life and death ==
Godard was married to two of his leading women: Anna Karina (1961–1965) and Anne Wiazemsky (1967–1979). Beginning in 1970, he collaborated personally and professionally with Anne-Marie Miéville. Godard lived with Miéville in Rolle, Switzerland, from 1978 onwards, and was described by his former wife Karina as a "recluse". Godard married Miéville in the 2010s, according to Patrick Jeanneret, an adviser to Godard.

His relationship with Karina in particular produced some of his most critically acclaimed films, and their relationship was widely publicised: The Independent described them as "one of the most celebrated pairings of the 1960s". Filmmaker magazine called their collaborations "arguably the most influential body of work in the history of cinema."

According to Karina, their relationship was tumultuous. Later in life, Karina said they no longer spoke to each other.

Through his father, he was the cousin of Pedro Pablo Kuczynski, former President of Peru.

In 2017, Michel Hazanavicius directed a film about Godard, Redoubtable, based on the memoir One Year After (French: Un an après; 2015) by Wiazemsky. It centres on his life in the late 1960s, when he and Wiazemsky made films together. The film premiered at the Cannes Film Festival in 2017. Godard said that the film was a "stupid, stupid idea".

Agnes Varda's 2017 documentary Faces Places culminates with Varda and co-director JR knocking on Godard's front door in Rolle for an interview. Godard agreed to the meeting but he "stands them up". His nephew and assistant Paul Grivas directed the 2018 documentary Film Catastrophe, which included behind-the-scenes footage, shot on the Costa Concordia cruise ship by Grivas during the making of Film Socialism, of Godard working with actors and directing the film. Godard participated in the 2022 documentary See You Friday, Robinson. Director Mitra Farahani initiated an email exchange between Godard and Iranian filmmaker Ebrahim Golestan, with emailed text letters from Golestan and "videos, images, and aphorism" responses from Godard.

At the age of 91, Godard died on 13 September 2022, at his home in Rolle. His death was reported as an assisted suicide procedure, which is legal in Switzerland. Godard's legal advisor said that he had "multiple disabling pathologies", but a family member said that "He was not sick, he was simply exhausted". Miéville was by his side when he died. His body was cremated and there was no funeral service.

== Legacy ==
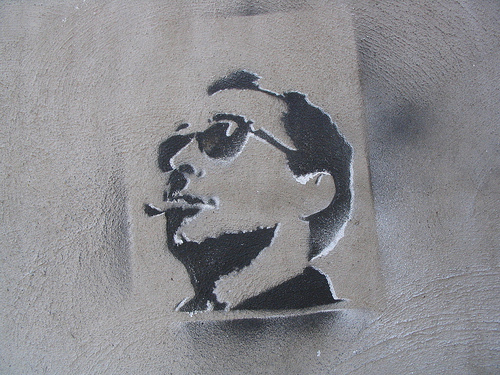
A stencil depicting Godard on a wall in Montreal.

Godard has been recognised as one of the most influential filmmakers of the 20th century and one of the leaders of the French New Wave.

Film critic Pauline Kael suggests that what made young people so drawn to Godard was the disturbing quality of this work.

In 1969, film critic Roger Ebert wrote about Godard's importance in cinema:

Godard is a director of the very first rank; no other director in the 1960s has had more influence on the development of the feature-length film. Like Joyce in fiction or Beckett in theater, he is a pioneer whose present work is not acceptable to present audiences. But his influence on other directors is gradually creating and educating an audience that will, perhaps in the next generation, be able to look back at his films and see that this is where their cinema began.

In 2001, Ebert recalled his early days as a critic, writing "As much as we talked about Tarantino after Pulp Fiction, we talked about Godard in those days." Tarantino named his production company A Band Apart, a reference to Godard's 1964 film. Tarantino says that "To me Godard did to movies what Bob Dylan did to music. They both revolutionized their forms."

Godard's works and innovations have received praise from notable directors such as Michelangelo Antonioni, Satyajit Ray, and George Lucas. Fritz Lang agreed to take part in Godard's film Le Mépris due to his admiration of Godard as a director. Akira Kurosawa listed Breathless as one of his 100 favourite films. Ingmar Bergman strongly disliked Godard, stating: "I've never gotten anything out of his movies. They have felt constructed, faux intellectual and completely dead. Cinematographically uninteresting and infinitely boring. He's made his films for the critics. One of the movies, Masculin Féminin (1966), was shot here in Sweden. It was mind-numbingly boring." Orson Welles admired Godard as a director but criticized him as a thinker, telling Peter Bogdanovich: "He is the definitive influence if not really the first great film artist of this last decade, and his gifts as a director are enormous. I just can't take him very seriously as a thinker—and that's where we seem to differ, because he does."

David Thomson reached a similar conclusion, writing that "Godard's greatness rests in his grasping of the idea that films are made of moving images, of moments from films, of images projected in front of audiences" but that "He knows only cinema: on politics and real life he is childish and pretentious." Still, Thomson calls Godard's early films "a magnificent critical explanation of American movies" and "one of the inescapable bodies of work" and deserving of retrospectives. Thomson included Pierrot le Fou on his Sight & Sound list. Political activist, critic and filmmaker Tariq Ali listed Godard's film Tout Va Bien as one of his ten favorite films of all time in the 2012 Sight and Sound critics' poll. American film critic Armond White listed Godard's film Nouvelle Vague as one of his top ten favorite films in the same poll. Susan Sontag called Vivre sa vie "one of the most extraordinary, beautiful and original works of art I know of." Four of Godard's films are included on the 2022 edition of the Sight and Sound list of 100 Greatest Films: Breathless (38), Le Mépris (54), Histoire(s) du cinéma (78) and Pierrot le Fou (85).

The 60th New York Film Festival paid tribute to Godard, who died earlier that year. The Onion paid homage to him with the headline "Jean-Luc Godard Dies At End of Life In Uncharacteristically Linear Narrative Choice."

== Selected filmography ==
Feature films

The list excludes multi-director anthology films to which Godard contributed shorts.

- 1960 Breathless
- 1961 A Woman Is a Woman
- 1962 My Life to Live
- 1963 The Little Soldier
- 1963 The Carabineers
- 1963 Contempt
- 1964 Band of Outsiders
- 1964 A Married Woman
- 1965 Alphaville
- 1965 Pierrot le Fou
- 1966 Masculin Féminin
- 1966 Made in U.S.A.
- 1967 Two or Three Things I Know About Her
- 1967 La Chinoise
- 1967 Week-end
- 1969 Joy of Learning
- 1970 Wind from the East
- 1971 Struggle in Italy
- 1971 Vladimir and Rosa
- 1972 Tout va bien
- 1975 Number Two
- 1976 How's It Going
- 1980 Every Man for Himself
- 1982 Passion
- 1983 First Name: Carmen
- 1985 Hail Mary
- 1985 Detective
- 1987 King Lear
- 1987 Keep Your Right Up
- 1990 New Wave
- 1991 Germany Year 90 Nine Zero
- 1993 The Kids Play Russian
- 1993 Oh Woe Is Me
- 1996 For Ever Mozart
- 2001 In Praise of Love
- 2004 Notre Musique
- 2010 Film Socialisme
- 2014 Goodbye to Language
- 2018 The Image Book

Documentary

- 1968 A Film Like Any Other
- 1968 Sympathy for the Devil
- 1969 British Sounds
- 1972 Letter to Jane
- 1976 Here and Elsewhere
- 1988 Histoire(s) du cinéma
- 1994 JLG/JLG – Self-Portrait in December

== Discography ==
Godard had a lasting friendship with Manfred Eicher, founder and head of the German music label ECM Records. The label released the soundtracks of Godard's Nouvelle Vague (ECM NewSeries 1600–01) and Histoire(s) du cinéma (ECM NewSeries 1706). This collaboration expanded over the years, leading to Godard's granting ECM permission to use stills from his films for album covers, while Eicher took over the musical direction of Godard films such as Allemagne 90 neuf zéro, Hélas Pour Moi, JLG, and For Ever Mozart. Tracks from ECM records have been used in his films; for example, the soundtrack for In Praise of Love uses Ketil Bjørnstad and David Darling's album Epigraphs extensively. Godard also released on the label a collection of shorts he made with Anne-Marie Miéville called Four Short Films (ECM 5001).

Among the ECM album covers with Godard's film stills are these:

- Voci, works of Luciano Berio played by Kim Kashkashian (ECM 1735)
- Words of The Angel, by Trio Mediaeval (ECM 1753)
- Morimur, by Christoph Poppen & The Hilliard Ensemble (ECM 1765)
- Songs of Debussy and Mozart, by Juliane Banse & András Schiff (ECM 1772)
- Requiem for Larissa, by Valentin Silvestrov (ECM 1778)
- Soul of Things, by Tomasz Stanko Quartet (ECM 1788)
- Suspended Night, by Tomasz Stanko Quartet (ECM 1868)
- Asturiana: Songs from Spain and Argentina, by Kim Kashkashian & Robert Levin (ECM 1975)
- Distances, by Norma Winstone, Glauco Venier & Klaus Gesing (ECM 2028)
- Live at Birdland, by Lee Konitz, Brad Mehldau, Charlie Haden & Paul Motian (ECM 2162)

== See also ==
- List of directors associated with art film

== Works cited ==
- Almeida, Jane. Dziga Vertov Group "Mostra Grupo Dziga Vertov". Archived from the original on 11 March 2007. São Paulo: witz, 2005. ISBN 85-98100-05-6.
- Nicole Brenez, David Faroult, Michael Temple, James E. Williams, Michael Witt (eds.) (2007). Jean-Luc Godard: Documents. Paris: Centre Georges Pompidou.
- Brody, Richard (2008). Everything Is Cinema: The Working Life of Jean-Luc Godard. Macmillan. ISBN 978-0-8050-6886-3.
- Dixon, Wheeler Winston. The Films of Jean-Luc Godard. Albany: State University of New York Press, 1997.
- Godard, Jean Luc (1986). Godard on Godard: Critical Writings by Jean-Luc Godard. Da Capo Press. ISBN 978-0-306-80259-1.
- Godard, Jean-Luc (2002). The Future(s) of Film: Three Interviews 2000–01. Bern; Berlin: Verlag Gachnang & Springer. ISBN 978-3-906127-62-0.
- Godard, Jean-Luc (2014). Introduction to a True History of Cinema and Television. Montreal: caboose. ISBN 978-0-9811914-1-6.
- Grant, Barry Keith, ed. (2007). Schirmer Encyclopedia of Film. Detroit: Schirmer Reference. ISBN 978-0-02-865791-2.
- Intxauspe, J.M. (2013). "Film Socialisme: Quo vadis Europa". hAUSnART, 3: 94–99.
- Lake, Steve and Griffiths, Paul, eds. (2007). Horizons Touched: the Music of ECM. Granta Books. ISBN 978-1-86207-880-2. 2007.
- Loshitzky, Yosefa. The Radical Faces of Godard and Bertolucci.
- MacCabe, Colin (2005). Godard: A Portrait of the Artist at Seventy. New York: Faber and Faber. ISBN 978-0-571-21105-0.
- Morrey, Douglas (2005). Jean-Luc Godard. New York: Manchester University Press. ISBN 978-0-7190-6759-4. Archived from the original on 1 January 2014.
- Müller, Lars (2010). Windfall Light: The Visual Language of ECM. Lars Müller Publishers. ISBN 978-3-03778-157-9 (in English) & ISBN 978-3-03778-197-5 (in German).
- Rainer Kern, Hans-Jürgen Linke and Wolfgang Sandner (2010). Der Blaue Klang. Wolke Verlag. ISBN 978-3-936000-83-2 (in German).
- Silverman, Kaja and Farocki, Harun. 1998. Speaking About Godard. New York: New York University Press.
- Sontag, Susan (1966). "Godard's Vivre sa Vie" in Against Interpretation. New York: Farrar, Straus and Giroux.
- Sontag, Susan (1969). "Godard" in Styles of Radical Will. New York: Farrar, Straus and Giroux.
- Steritt, David (1998). Jean-Luc Godard: Interviews. Jackson, Mississippi: University Press of Mississippi. ISBN 9781578060818.
- Sterritt, David (13 August 1999). The Films of Jean-Luc Godard: Seeing the Invisible. Cambridge University Press. ISBN 978-0-521-58971-0. Archived from the original on 3 August 2020.
- Stevenson, Diane. "Godard and Bazin" in the Andre Bazin special issue, Jeffrey Crouse (ed.), Film International, Issue 30, Vol. 5, No. 6, 2007, pp. 32–40.
- Temple, Michael. Williams, James S. Witt, Michael (eds.) 2007. For Ever Godard. London: Black Dog Publishing.
- Temple, Michael and Williams, James S. (eds.) (2000). The Cinema Alone: Essays on the Work of Jean-Luc Godard 1985–2000. Amsterdam: Amsterdam University Press.
- Usher, Phillip John (2009). "De Sexe Incertain: Masculin, Féminin de Godard". French Forum, vol. 34, no. 2, pp. 97–112.
- Wills, David (28 April 2000). Jean-Luc Godard's Pierrot Le Fou. Cambridge University Press. ISBN 978-0-521-57489-1. Archived from the original on 3 August 2020.
