= For Ever Mozart =

- Directed by: Jean-Luc Godard
- Written by: Jean-Luc Godard
- Produced by: Alain Sarde
- Starring: Madeleine Assas; Ghalia Lacroix; Frédéric Pierrot
- Cinematography: Katell Djian; Jean-Pierre Fedrizzi; Christophe Pollock
- Edited by: Jean-Luc Godard
- Music by: David Darling; Ketil Bjørnstad; Jon Christensen; Ben Harper; György Kurtág; Ludwig van Beethoven; Wolfgang Amadeus Mozart
- Distributed by: Les Films du Losange
- Release date: 1996
- Running time: 84 minutes
- Countries: France; Switzerland
- Language: French

For Ever Mozart is a 1996 feature film directed, written and edited by Jean-Luc Godard. The film's title is a bilingual pun intentionally meant to sound like "Faut rêver Mozart" ("Dream Mozart, dream" in French). The film was selected as the Swiss entry for the Best Foreign Language Film at the 70th Academy Awards, but was not accepted as a nominee.

== Plot ==
The film is divided into four parts, which Godard has subsequently given by name.

=== Theater ===
In the first part, Vicky Vitalis, an elderly film director, is casting a new project called "Fatal Bolero," assisted by his nephew, Jérôme. A group of actors lines up to audition, but Vicky is dissatisfied with each of their line readings. The director nevertheless manages to secure funding from a man called Baron Felix, who himself secures one of the actresses named Sabine, to the chagrin of Sabine's plaintive boyfriend. Later, Jérôme accompanies Vicky's daughter, Camille, a professor of philosophy, as she searches for a copy of The Game of Love and Chance, the play by Pierre de Marivaux. Her intention is to stage the play in war torn Sarajevo. However, unable to find a copy, she settles instead on the Alfred de Musset play One Must Not Trifle with Love, happily noting that she shares the same name as the play's heroine. Jérôme, smitten with his cousin, decides to go to Sarajevo with her, to his mother Sylvie's dismay. Sylvie persuades her brother Vicky to accompany them, and the family's maid, Jamila, also decides to go. Camille and Jérôme decide to cast Jamila in the play as the character Rosette.

=== One Must Not Trifle with Love in Sarajevo ===
In the second part, the four take a train to Bosnia and rough it in the wild. Increasingly unable to share in his young charges' idealism, Vicky abandons them, filling the role of a West European who turns his back on the horrors of the Bosnian war. The spectre of tanks begins to appear in the forest, and not long after, Camille, Jérôme, and Jamila are captured by Serbian paramilitaries and taken to a derelict mansion the paramilitaries are using as a base. There, Camille and Jérôme metaphorically dig their own graves when they correct a Serbian commander on his account of Georges Danton's participation in the French Revolution. After being anally violated, they are forced to literally dig their own graves, and are killed in an ensuing attack on the base. Jamila, and a soldier having taken a liking to her, escape.

=== The Film of Disquiet ===
The third part sees Vicky working on "Fatal Bolero" by the seaside. Baron Felix, the film's financier, holds court at a nearby casino. There the former actress Sabine, now the Baron's dutiful assistant, transcribes the dialogue of an anally fixated porn film while the Baron doles out money for Vicky's film. On the beach, Vicky arranges an unnamed Actress and Actor on the sand in imitation of Camille's and Jérôme's deaths. Later, he relentlessly shoots take after take of the Actress as she tries to articulate her lines – statements once spoken by Camille – amid a torrent of wind and rain. The elderly director eventually instructs the young Actress to shout simply, "yes." The scene shifts to the film's debut at a small theater. The people lining up don't even make it inside. Realizing that it is an art film shot in black and white, depicting the horrors of war, and not the least bit prurient, they wander off in disgust to see something called "Terminator 4," while the theater owner hurriedly removes the posters for the film. Sabine's ex-boyfriend arrives and declares to Baron Felix that "justice has been served."

=== For Ever Mozart ===
In the fourth and final movement, a group of people files into an ornate hall to attend a Mozart piano concerto performed by a youth orchestra. The performance is unable to begin until the pianist, an effete young man in period garb, secures one of the set runners from "Fatal Bolero" as a page turner. As the performance commences, a fatigued Vicky keeps time to the music in the hallway, unable to make it past the top of the stairs. Inside, the music plays on, and the pages, showing Mozart's carefully crafted notation, keep turning.

== Cast ==
- Vicky Messica: Metteur en scène
- Madeleine Assas: Camille
- Frédéric Pierrot : Jérôme
- Ghalia Lacroix : Jamila
- Bérangère Allaux : Actrice
- Michel Francini : Baron
- Sabine Bail : Amie du Baron
- Euryale Wynter M-Joseph Florian LEBRUN : Mozart

== Background ==
The point of departure for the film was an article by Philippe Sollers in Le Monde about Susan Sontag's idea to stage a performance of Samuel Beckett's Waiting for Godot in Sarajevo. In the article, Sollers criticizes the plan, considering Beckett too depressing for the Bosnian War, and instead suggests Marivaux's The Game of Love and Chance. Godard himself could not find the play at the bookstore in his home town of Rolle, so he substituted the Musset play, as Camille does in the film.

== Reception ==
For Ever Mozart has an approval rating of 45% on review aggregator website Rotten Tomatoes, based on 11 reviews, and an average rating of 5.7/10.

Writing in Variety, David Stratton called the film "appallingly superficial and insensitive" for its "trivializ[ation of] the slaughter in Bosnia"; while Jonathan Rosenbaum declared the film Godard's "least-inspired feature since the late 60s." French critics were much more receptive. In the US, Amy Taubin, writing in the Village Voice, emphatically endorsed the film, saying, "In confronting the failure of art to change the course of history and the moral obligation of the artist to nevertheless bear witness to her/his time, For Ever Mozart treads on ground so familiar it can only be played as farce . . . In the age of unreason . . . beautiful image(s) . . . collide, fragment, and fly apart."

== See also ==
- List of submissions to the 70th Academy Awards for Best Foreign Language Film
- List of Swiss submissions for the Academy Award for Best Foreign Language Film
