= Wind from the East =

- Directed by: Dziga Vertov Group; Jean-Luc Godard (uncredited); Jean-Pierre Gorin (uncredited); Gérard Martin (uncredited)
- Written by: Sergio Bazzini; Daniel Cohn-Bendit; Jean-Luc Godard
- Starring: Gian Maria Volonté; Anne Wiazemsky; Cristiana Tullio-Altan
- Release date: 19 August 1970
- Running time: 95 minutes
- Country: France
- Language: French

Wind from the East (French: Le Vent d'est) is a 1970 film by the Dziga Vertov Group, a radical filmmaking cooperative that, at its core, included Jean-Luc Godard and Jean-Pierre Gorin. As with most films from this period in Godard's career, directing credit was given to the collective and not himself or other individual filmmakers.

Of the Dziga Vertov Group films, Wind from the East became particularly notable due to Peter Wollen's influential essay about it: "Godard and Counter Cinema: Vent d'est." Wollen contends that Wind from the East exemplifies how Brechtian principles of "epic theatre" can be applied to film as "counter cinema."

== Synopsis ==
The film reflects Gorin and (especially) Godard's interest in divorcing sound from image, as a means of reinventing the language of "bourgeois" commercial cinema.

The soundtrack of the film begins with the story of a kidnapped ALCOA executive but abruptly changes the subject to a lengthy lecture on the history and political context of revolutionary cinema, including Marxist–Leninist self-critique, and a critique of Hollywood's film industry. The visual component of the film features an outdoor natural setting and characters in what appears to be a spaghetti Western film (or a parody thereof). The two components, while separate, frequently interact; the soundtrack occasionally refers to the cinematic tropes that appear onscreen, while the story told in the visuals contains dialogue and sound that overlaps and competes with the primary soundtrack.

== Cast ==
- Gian Maria Volonté - Le ranger nordiste
- Anne Wiazemsky - La révolutionnaire
- Allan Midgette - L'Indien
- Christiana Tullio Altan - La jeune bourgeoise
- José Varela - La guide
- Götz George - Soldier

== Reception ==
John Simon described Wind from the East as 'a piece of infantile Maoist propaganda, so boring, antifilmic, sloppily made, and yes, insane, I see no point in a detailed description of it'.
