= Vivre sa vie =

1962 film by Jean-Luc Godard

- Theatrical release poster
- Directed by: Jean-Luc Godard
- Written by: Jean-Luc Godard
- Produced by: Pierre Braunberger
- Starring: Anna Karina; Sady Rebbot
- Cinematography: Raoul Coutard
- Edited by: Jean-Luc Godard; Agnès Guillemot
- Music by: Michel Legrand
- Production company: Les Films de la Pléiade
- Distributed by: Panthéon Distribution
- Release dates: 28 August 1962 (Venice); 20 September 1962 (France)
- Running time: 85 minutes
- Country: France
- Language: French
- Budget: $40,000

Vivre sa vie (French: Vivre sa vie : film en douze tableaux, lit. 'To Live Her Life: A Film in Twelve Scenes', pronounced [vivʁ(ə) sa vi]) is a 1962 French New Wave drama film written and directed by Jean-Luc Godard. The film was released in the United States as My Life to Live and in the United Kingdom as It's My Life. It was met with critical acclaim for Anna Karina's performance and Godard's direction. It has been regarded it as one of Godard's best films and one of the greatest films of all time.

== Plot ==
The film is divided into 12 "episodes", each preceded by an intertitle.

Nana Kleinfrankenheim, a beautiful 22-year-old Parisian, leaves her husband Paul and her infant son, hoping to become an actress. The couple meet in a café and play pinball one last time before deciding to end their marriage. Now working in a record store, Nana struggles to earn enough money on her own. She tries to borrow 2,000 francs from several co-workers, but they all refuse. To make matters worse, Nana's landlady throws her out of her apartment for not paying rent.

The next day, Nana meets with Paul, who gives her pictures of her son to keep for herself. Paul invites her to dinner, but Nana declines and explains she is seeing a film with another man. They watch The Passion of Joan of Arc, moving Nana to tears. After the film, Nana ditches her date to meet with a man who promised he would take photos to promote her acting career. When asked to undress for the photos, Nana reluctantly complies.

Nana is questioned in a police station for trying to steal 1,000 francs from a woman on the street, who dropped the money in front of her. Nana returned the money out of guilt, but the woman still pressed charges. Walking down a street, Nana notices a female prostitute. A man asks Nana if he can join her, assuming she is also a prostitute; she agrees and they go to a hotel room. Nana asks him for 4,000 francs. He gives her 5,000 and says she can keep the change. Nana is visibly uncomfortable as he attempts to kiss her on the lips.

Nana runs into a friend, Yvette, and they go for lunch at a diner. Yvette reveals that she became a prostitute after her husband abandoned her and her son, as it was the easiest way to make money without him. Yvette introduces Nana to her pimp, Raoul, who is also at the diner. Nana impresses Raoul and the three play pinball when, suddenly, a police shootout ensues outside. A bloodied man who has been shot runs inside, prompting Nana to flee the diner.

Sometime later at a restaurant, Nana writes a letter asking for work (presumably as a prostitute) to an address Yvette gave her, describing herself and her physical features. Raoul sits down next to her and advises her to stay in Paris, where he can help her make more money. Nana agrees to work for him and they kiss. She quits her job at the record store and abandons her dream of becoming an actress. Raoul explains the basics of prostitution to Nana, including how to conduct herself, how much she charges and earns, when and where she works, the laws and what to do if faced with an unintended pregnancy. Nana soon begins to attract several clients.

On one of Nana's days off, Raoul takes her to meet his friends at a bistro, where she dances to a song playing on a jukebox. The men are mostly uninterested, except for a young man playing at a billiard table who buys her a pack of cigarettes. While on the street, Nana picks up a client and takes him to a nearby hotel. The man requests she ask other prostitutes in the hotel to join them, but once one does, the client no longer wants Nana to join, so she sits on the edge of the bed and smokes.

Nana is now a seasoned prostitute and blends in with the others on the streets. She is in a hotel room with the young man she had met earlier at the bistro, who reads aloud a passage from "The Oval Portrait" by Edgar Allan Poe. As Nana and the young man express their mutual adoration, she decides she wants to live with him and quit prostitution. When Nana confronts Raoul, they argue, as he was planning to sell her to another pimp. Raoul forces Nana into his car and drives her to the pimp's meeting place. However, the transaction falls through and Nana ends up being killed in a gun battle. The pimps flee the scene, leaving Nana's body lying on the pavement.

== Cast ==
- Anna Karina as Nana Kleinfrankenheim
- Sady Rebbot as Raoul (credited as Saddy Rebbot)
- André Labarthe as Paul
- Guylaine Schlumberger as Yvette (credited as G. Schlumberger)
- Gérard Hoffman as boss
- Monique Messine as Elisabeth
- Paul Pavel as journalist
- Dimitri Dineff as guy
- Peter Kassovitz as young man
- Eric Schlumberger as Luigi (credited as E. Schlumberger)
- Brice Parain as philosopher
- Henri Attal as Arthur (credited as Henri Atal)
- Gilles Quéant as man
- Odile Geoffroy as waitress
- Marcel Charton as policeman

== Production ==
The film was shot over the course of four weeks for $40,000.

== Style ==
In Vivre sa vie, Godard borrowed the aesthetics of the cinéma vérité approach to documentary film-making that was then becoming fashionable. However, this film differed from other films of the French New Wave by being photographed with a heavy Mitchell camera, as opposed to the light-weight cameras used for earlier films. The cinematographer was Raoul Coutard, a frequent collaborator of Godard's.

== Influences ==
One of the film's original sources is a study of contemporary prostitution, Où en est la prostitution by Marcel Sacotte, an examining magistrate.

Vivre sa vie was released shortly after Cahiers du cinéma (the film magazine for which Godard occasionally wrote) published an issue devoted to Bertolt Brecht and his theory of 'epic theatre'. Godard may have been influenced by it, as Vivre sa vie uses several alienation effects: twelve intertitles appear before the film's 'chapters' explaining what will happen next; jump cuts disrupt the editing flow; characters are shot from behind when they are talking; they are strongly backlit; they talk directly to the camera; the statistical results derived from official questionnaires are given in a voice-over; and so on.

The film also draws from the writings of Montaigne, Baudelaire, Zola and Edgar Allan Poe, to the cinema of Robert Bresson, Jean Renoir and Carl Dreyer. French critic Jean Douchet has written that Godard's film "would have been impossible without Street of Shame (1956), [Kenji] Mizoguchi's last and most sublime film." Nana gets into an earnest discussion with a philosopher (played by Brice Parain, Godard's former philosophy tutor), about the limits of speech and written language. In the next scene, as if to illustrate this point, the sound track ceases and the images are overlaid by Godard's personal narration. This formal playfulness is typical for the way in which the director was working with sound and vision during this period.

The film depicts the consumerist culture of Godard's Paris; a shiny new world of cinemas, coffee bars, neon-lit pool halls, pop records, photographs, wall posters, pin-ups, pinball machines, juke boxes, foreign cars, the latest hairstyles, typewriters, advertising, gangsters and Americana. It also features allusions to popular culture; for example, the scene where a melancholy young man walks into a café, puts on a juke box disc, and then sits down to listen. The unnamed actor is in fact the well known singer-songwriter Jean Ferrat, who is performing his own hit tune "Ma Môme" on the track that he has just selected. Nana's bobbed haircut replicates that made famous by Louise Brooks in the 1928 film Pandora's Box, where the doomed heroine also falls into a life of prostitution and violent death. One sequence shows a queue outside a Paris cinema waiting to see Jules et Jim, the new wave film directed by François Truffaut, at the time both a close friend and sometime rival of Godard.

== Reception ==
The film was the fourth most popular movie at the French box office in its year of release. It won the Grand Jury Prize at the 1962 Venice Film Festival.

=== Critical response ===
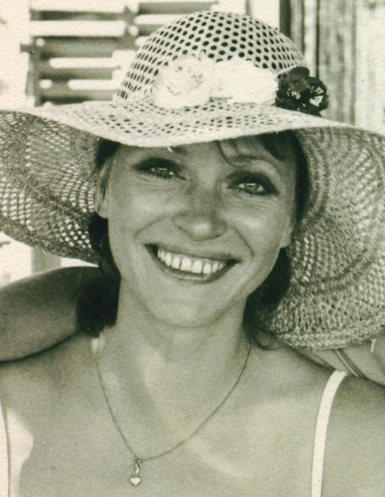
Anna Karina's lead performance (age of 22-years-old at that time) received universal praise from critics and audiences alike for her portrayal. Noticing her charismatic, nuanced and naturalistic acting as Nana bringing gravitas, emotional depth and humanity to the character. It is widely seen by many as one of the finest female performances of all time in movie history.

Vivre sa Vie was met with critical acclaim. Author and cultural critic Susan Sontag described Vivre sa vie as "a perfect film" and "one of the most extraordinary, beautiful, and original works of art that I know of." Her 1966 book Against Interpretation includes an essay on the film. Roger Ebert added it to his Great Movies and wrote,"The effect of the film is astonishing. It is clear, astringent, unsentimental, abrupt." In a 2015 review of the film's DVD, Philip French of The Guardian called it one of the most influential French films of all time.

Stanley Kauffmann of The New Republic gave a negative review, describing Vivre sa vie as "empty and pretentious".

On the review aggregator website Rotten Tomatoes, the film holds an approval rating of 88% based on 34 reviews, with an average rating of 8.1/10. The website's critics consensus reads, "Anna Karina's arresting performance provides a humanizing anchor to Jean-Luc Godard's stylistically explosive portrait of a prostitute."

In the 2022 Sight and Sound critic's poll, the film received 18 votes from critics and was ranked at 157th place, tying with films like Once Upon a Time in America, Los Olvidados, and Ikiru. It received six votes from directors, but wasn't featured on the directors' poll.

The website They Shoot Pictures, Don't They, which aggregates thousands of films polls to determine the most acclaimed films of all time, ranked Vivre sa vie at 128th place. It is the fourth-highest rated film by Jean-Luc Godard on the website.
