= Dziga Vertov Group =

Collective of activist filmmakers

The Dziga Vertov Group (French: Groupe Dziga Vertov) was formed around 1969 by politically active filmmakers including Jean-Luc Godard and Jean-Pierre Gorin. Their films are defined primarily for Brechtian forms, Marxist ideology, and a lack of personal authorship.

== History ==
The roots of the project began with Godard's increased collaboration with other politically-motivated filmmakers, such as the group project Cinetracts, the incomplete 1968 film One A.M. shot with D.A. Pennebaker, and the 1970 film British Sounds/See You at Mao made with Jean-Henri Roger. Eventually Godard and Gorin officially started creating films under the name Dziga Vertov Group, named after 1920s-'30s Soviet filmmaker Dziga Vertov (1896-1954).

They are generally credited with having made four films:

- 1970 Pravda
- 1970 Le Vent d'est (Wind from the East)
- 1971 Luttes en Italie (Struggles in Italy), originally Lotte in Italia
- 1971 Vladimir et Rosa (Vladimir and Rosa)

The project eventually dissolved soon after the completion of 1971's Vladimir et Rosa.

== Legacy ==
Following the last film made under the group name, Godard and Gorin made two more films together in 1972: Letter to Jane and Tout va bien (Everything's Fine). Another film had been shot in Palestine before the group dissolved entitled Jusqu'à la victoire. It was not completed after the film's subjects and members of the Palestine Liberation Organization were killed shortly after the initial footage was taken. Jean-Luc Godard later used the existing material as the basis for his 1976 film Ici et ailleurs (Here and Elsewhere). In the film, Godard and his wife, Anne-Marie Miéville, deconstruct his and Gorin's methods for making Jusqu'à la victoire and they in turn call into question the methods and the manifesto of the Dziga Vertov Group as a whole.
