= Germany Year 90 Nine Zero =

- Directed by: Jean-Luc Godard
- Written by: Jean-Luc Godard
- Produced by: Nicole Ruellé
- Starring: Eddie Constantine
- Cinematography: Christophe Pollock
- Edited by: Jean-Luc Godard
- Release date: 1991
- Running time: 62 minutes
- Country: France
- Languages: French; German

Germany Year 90 Nine Zero (French: Allemagne année 90 neuf zéro) is a French film directed by Jean-Luc Godard and starring Eddie Constantine in his signature role as detective Lemmy Caution. This is the second film in which Godard and Constantine collaborated with the Lemmy Caution character, although it is not a sequel to Alphaville. It was also the 15th and final time that Constantine would play his signature role in 40 years.

The film was screened in competition at the 48th Venice International Film Festival, in which it won the President of the Italian Senate's Gold Medal.

The title is a reference to the 1948 Roberto Rossellini film Germany, Year Zero.

== Summary ==
Just after the fall of the Berlin Wall, Lemmy Caution roams around the city aimlessly. The film is part narrative and part documentary essay picture about German history and politics.

== Plot ==
Thirty years ago, the Allied occupying powers stationed Lemmy Caution as a sleeper agent in East Berlin under the false name Konrad Witrowsky. After a long search, he is found there by Count Zelten of the Federal Intelligence Service (BND). Zelten confesses that Lemmy's files have disappeared, and he has therefore been forgotten. Zelten sends Lemmy on one last journey west. On his way through the reunited Germany, he encounters well-known figures such as Charlotte Kestner and Don Quixote, who battles the dragons—in the form of bucket-wheel excavators—in an open-cast mine. He visits famous sites like the Alexander Pushkin Monument and Schiller's House, and sees newsreel footage of the events at the Dachau concentration camp. Memories of Goethe's Faust and Grimmelshausen's The Adventurous Simplicissimus reveal positive developments in Germany. Lemmy's journey, which he always commented on with quotations, ends in a hotel room where he marvels at the Bible that is always present in the bedside tables.

== Cast ==
- Eddie Constantine as Lemmy Caution
- Hanns Zischler as Count Zelten
- Claudia Michelsen as Charlotte Kestner / Dora
- Nathalie Kadem as Delphine de Stael
- André S. Labarthe as Récitant
- Robert Wittmers as Don Quichotte
- Kim Kashkashian as Musician
- Anton Mossine as Dimitri
