= Weekend (1967 film) =

Film by Jean-Luc Godard

- Theatrical release poster
- French: Week-end
- Directed by: Jean-Luc Godard
- Screenplay by: Jean-Luc Godard
- Based on: "La autopista del Sur" by Julio Cortázar (uncredited)
- Produced by: Raymond Danon
- Starring: Mireille Darc; Jean Yanne
- Cinematography: Raoul Coutard
- Edited by: Agnès Guillemot
- Music by: Antoine Duhamel
- Production companies: Les Films Copernic; COMACICO; Lira Films; Cinecidi
- Distributed by: Athos Films (France); Magna (Italy)
- Release dates: 29 December 1967 (France); 1 May 1968 (Italy)
- Running time: 105 minutes
- Countries: France; Italy
- Language: French
- Budget: $250,000 (estimated)

Weekend (French: Week-end) is a 1967 postmodern black comedy film written and directed by Jean-Luc Godard, based on Julio Cortázar's short story "La autopista del Sur". It stars mainstream French TV stars Mireille Darc and Jean Yanne. Jean-Pierre Léaud, star of numerous French New Wave films, including François Truffaut's The 400 Blows (1959) and Godard's earlier Masculin Féminin (1966), appeared in two roles. Raoul Coutard served as cinematographer and Suzanne Schiffman as script supervisor.

== Plot ==
Roland and Corinne Durand are a bourgeois couple. Each has a secret lover and conspires to murder the other. They drive to Corinne's parents' home in the country to secure her inheritance from her dying father, resolving to resort to murder if necessary. The trip becomes a chaotic journey through a French countryside populated by bizarre characters and punctuated by violent car accidents. After their own Facel-Vega is destroyed in a collision, they wander through a series of vignettes involving class struggle and figures from literature and history, such as Louis Antoine de Saint-Just and Emily Brontë.

In a metafictional touch, some scenes show the characters in the film being self-aware such as a driver asking Roland after being flagged down, "Are you in a film or reality?", the film's real actors from the Italian co-production being mentioned during Corinne and Roland's search for a car to Oinville (to which they never specify further as to which Oinville they are referring to), and various intertitles which are a defining feature to Godard's films.

When Corinne and Roland eventually arrive at her parents' place, they discover that her father has died and her mother refuses to give them a share of the spoils. They kill her and hit the road again, only to fall into the hands of a group of hippie revolutionaries (calling themselves the Seine and Oise Liberation Front) that support themselves through theft and cannibalism. Killed during an escape attempt, Roland is chopped up and cooked.

== Cast ==
- Mireille Darc as Corinne
- Jean Yanne as Roland
- Paul Gégauff as pianist
- Jean-Pierre Léaud as Saint-Just and man in phone booth
- Blandine Jeanson as Emily Brontë and page-turner for pianist
- Yves Afonso as Tom Thumb
- Jean-Pierre Kalfon as the leader of Front de Libération de la Seine et Oise
- Juliet Berto as a member of FLSO and a bourgeoise in a Triumph
- Jean Eustache as a hitchhiker
- László Szabó as an Arab garbage collector and revolutionary
- Omar Diop as an African garbage collector and revolutionary
- Anne Wiazemsky as an audience member in the piano recital
- Michel Cournot as an audience member in the piano recital

== Themes and style ==
Weekend has been compared to Alice in Wonderland, the James Bond series, and the works of the Marquis de Sade. Tim Brayton described it as a "film that reads itself, tells the viewer what that reading should be, and at the same time tells the viewer that this reading is inaccurate and should be ignored." In one of the early scenes, Corinne tells her lover about a sexual experience she had. Part of the story she tells is based on the Georges Bataille novel Story of the Eye (Histoire de l'œil).

== Inspiration ==
According to a letter from Argentine writer Julio Cortázar to his translator Suzanne Jill Levine, the indirect inspiration for the film was Cortázar's short story "La autopista del Sur" ("The Southern Thruway"). Cortázar explained that while a British producer was considering filming his story, a third party had presented the idea to Godard, who was unaware of its true source.

== Reception ==
On Rotten Tomatoes, the film holds an approval rating of 93%, based on 28 reviews, with an average rating of 8.7/10. The website's critics consensus reads "Jean-Luc Godard fixes his considerable ire against French society and the broader human condition in the morbidly funny Weekend, an abstract road trip to damnation that finds the enfant terrible in peak form."

== Animal cruelty ==
The film shows a range of gruesome treatments of animals, starting with a motif of a skinned rabbit, which gives way to full-blooded slaughter of animals in the final scene of the film. The animals were actually slaughtered, graphically, and it has been argued that the film fails to condemn the behaviour, even whilst exposing its horrors, through suggesting that it is permissible to kill animals, as animalism, which is also found in bourgeoise society, is subhuman and worthy of sacrifice.
