= British Sounds =

1969 TV film by Jean-Luc Godard and Jean-Henri Roger

- Opening titles
- Directed by: Jean-Luc Godard; Jean-Henri Roger
- Countries of origin: France; United Kingdom

Production
- Producers: Irving Teitelbaum; Kenith Trodd
- Editor: Elizabeth Kozmian (aka Christine Aya)
- Running time: 54 minutes
- Production company: Kestrel Productions

Original release
- Release: 1969

British Sounds (also known as See You at Mao) is an hour-long avant-garde documentary film shot in February 1969 for television, written and directed by Jean-Luc Godard and Jean-Henri Roger, and produced by Irving Teitelbaum and Kenith Trodd. It was produced during Godard's most outspokenly political period. London Weekend Television refused to screen it owing to its controversial content, but it was subsequently released in cinemas. Godard credited the film as being made by 'Comrades of the Dziga-Vertov Group'.

== Synopsis ==
The film opens with a long tracking shot of workers at an MG Cars manufacturing plant, with a voiceover containing quotes from the Communist Manifesto. Subsequent scenes depict a naked woman walking around a house with a voiceover from a Marxist feminist tract, a newsreader, representing the British bourgeoisie, delivering a reactionary rant interspersed with footage of workers, a meeting of Trotskyist trade unionists, students creating political posters against a soundtrack of parodies of songs by The Beatles. The film closes with footage of fists punching through Union Jacks.
