= Jean-Pierre Gorin =

French filmmaker and professor (born 1943)

- Born: 17 April 1943 (age 83); Paris, France
- Citizenship: French
- Occupations: Director, producer
- Years active: 1968–present
- Notable work: Tout Va Bien, Poto and Cabengo

Jean-Pierre Gorin (born 17 April 1943) is a French filmmaker and professor, best known for his work with Nouvelle Vague luminary Jean-Luc Godard, during what is often referred to as Godard's "radical" period.

Jean-Pierre Gorin was a student of Louis Althusser, Michel Foucault and Jacques Lacan. He was a radical leftist well before meeting Godard in 1966. Godard relied on some of his discussions with Gorin while writing the script of 1967's La Chinoise. Gorin played a role in making Le Gai Savoir, which was released in 1969. In 1968, Gorin and Godard founded the collective Dziga Vertov Group and together produced a series of overtly political films including Vent d'est (1970), Tout va bien (1972), and Letter to Jane (1972).

Gorin left France in the mid-1970s to accept a teaching position at the University of California, San Diego at the urging of the film-critic and painter Manny Farber. Gorin remained on the Visual Arts faculty thereafter, teaching film history and film criticism. He continued to make films—most notably a "Southern California tetralogy" of essay films: Poto and Cabengo (1978), Routine Pleasures (1986), My Crasy Life (1991), and Letter to Peter (1992). Gorin describes his concept of Poto and Cabengo in 1988:

The film is about an unstructured discourse—the language of the twins—surrounded by structured discourses—the discourse of the family, the discourse of the media, the discourse of therapy, the discourse of documentary filmmaking.... [The twins' language] erupts as a subversive act which has not been authorized by any social or ideological establishment. In a sense its special threat is that its "unauthorized" nature relativizes the arbitrary nature of those institutionalized discourses. The singsong of the twins reveals the shaky grounds of institutional power. It relativizes discursive authority from the family to the scientific community in their competitive and ineffectual attempts to "define" the twins who spontaneously flit about the screen exceeding any definition.

== Selected filmography ==
- 1972 Tout Va Bien
- 1972 Letter to Jane: An Investigation About a Still
- 1976 Here and Elsewhere
- 1980 Poto and Cabengo
- 1986 Routine Pleasures
- 1992 My Crasy Life
- 1992 Letter to Peter
