= Letter to Jane =

- Directed by: Jean-Luc Godard; Jean-Pierre Gorin
- Release date: 1972
- Running time: 52 minutes
- Language: English

Letter to Jane is a 1972 French postscript film to Tout Va Bien directed by Jean-Luc Godard and Jean-Pierre Gorin and made under the auspices of the Dziga Vertov Group. Narrated in a back-and-forth style by both Godard and Gorin, the film serves as a 52-minute cinematic essay that deconstructs a single news photograph of Jane Fonda in Vietnam. This was Godard and Gorin's final collaboration.

Susan Sontag described Letter to Jane as, "a model lesson on how to read any photograph, how to decipher the un-innocent nature of a photograph’s framing, angle, focus." However, the film was described by some critics, including Laura Mulvey, as misogynistic. Fonda herself later called the film "a big pile of bullshit."

== Release ==
In 2005, the film was made available as an extra on the Tout va Bien DVD released by the Criterion Collection.
