= Tout Va Bien =

1972 French-Italian film

Tout va bien
- Directed by: Jean-Luc Godard; Jean-Pierre Gorin
- Written by: Jean-Luc Godard; Jean-Pierre Gorin
- Produced by: Jean-Pierre Rassam
- Starring: Yves Montand; Jane Fonda; Vittorio Caprioli
- Cinematography: Armand Marco
- Music by: Paul Beuscher
- Production companies: Anouchka Films; Vieco Films; Empire Films
- Distributed by: Gaumont
- Release dates: 28 April 1972 (France); 30 November 1972 (Italy)
- Running time: 95 minutes
- Countries: France; Italy
- Languages: French, English

Tout va bien is a 1972 French-Italian political drama film directed by Jean-Luc Godard and collaborator Jean-Pierre Gorin and starring Jane Fonda and Yves Montand.

The film's title means "everything is going well". It was released in the United States under the title All's Well and internationally under the title Just Great.

The Godard/Gorin collaboration continued with the featurette Letter to Jane as a postscript to Tout va bien.

== Overview ==
The film centers on a strike at a sausage factory, which is witnessed by an American reporter and her French husband, who is a director of TV commercials. The film has a strong political message, which outlines the logic of the class struggle in France in the wake of the May 1968 civil unrest. It also examines the social destruction caused by capitalism. The performers in Tout va bien employ the Brechtian technique of distancing themselves from the audience. By delivering an opaque performance, the actors draw the audience away from the film's diegesis and towards broader inferences about the film's meaning.

The factory set in Tout va bien

The factory set consists of a cross-sectioned building and allows the camera to dolly back and forth from room to room, theoretically through the walls. Another self-reflexive technique, this particular set was used because it forces the audience to remember that they are witnessing a film, breaking the fourth wall in a literal sense. Godard and Gorin use other self-reflexive techniques in Tout va bien such as direct camera address, long takes, and abandonment of the continuity editing system.

== Cast ==
- Jane Fonda as Susan Dewitt, an American reporter
- Yves Montand as her husband
- Vittorio Caprioli as the factory manager
- Elizabeth Chauvin as Genevieve
- Éric Chartier as Lucien
- Jean Pignol as the union representative
- Anne Wiazemsky as a leftist worker

== Selection ==
The film was selected for the Venice Film Festival in 1972 but was withdrawn by its directors who chose to screen it at the "counter-festival" organized by two Italian authors' associations, ANAC and ANCI, promoted in particular by Pier Paolo Pasolini.
