= Bad Cop =

Bad Cop may refer to:

- Bad Cop/Bad Cop, an American punk rock band
- Bad Cop, Bad Cop, a 2002 Australian television series
- Bad Cop (TV series), a 2024 Hindi-language crime thriller television series, adapted from the below
- Bad Cop - kriminell gut, a 2017 German television series
