= Aishwarya Sushmita =

Indian actress

- Born: 12 July 1995 (age 31); Darbhanga, Bihar, India
- Occupation: Actress
- Years active: 2013–present

Aishwarya Sushmita (born 12 July 1995) is an Indian actress and model who works in Hindi films and series. She gained recognition after winning the Kingfisher Calendar Supermodels 3 in 2016, which was shot in Seychelles. Sushmita made her acting debut in the Disney+ Hotstar web series Special Ops 1.5: The Himmat Story (2021) and has appeared in the thriller Runway 34 (2022). She received further acclaim for her performance as Meeta Devi in the Netflix crime series Khakee: The Bihar Chapter (2022), and played the role of Kiki in the Disney+ Hotstar series Bad Cop (2024).

== Early life ==
Aishwarya Sushmita was born on 12 July in Darbhanga, Bihar India. Growing up she completed her high schooling from Banasthali Vidyapith in Rajasthan. She later attended Indraprastha College for Women, University of Delhi, where she earned both her bachelor’s and master’s degrees, majoring in Philosophy

Her unique name was inspired by two iconic beauty queens Aishwarya Rai and Sushmita Sen, both of whom captured global attention in the 1990s. Her parents combined these names as a tribute to their individuality and impact.

== Career ==
In 2016, she achieved significant recognition by winning Kingfisher Supermodels 3, which led to a cover shoot for the Kingfisher Calendar in the Seychelles.

Afterwards, she walked the ramp in prestigious events like Lakme Fashion Week, India Fashion Week, and Blenders Pride Fashion Tour. She also collaborated with top Indian designers, including Rohit Bal, Anita Dongre, Manish Arora, Manish Malhotra, Rahul Khanna, etc. Apart from modeling, she trained as a national-level badminton player, and is also a trained Kathak Indian classical, belly, and jazz dancer.

== Transition to acting ==
Her acting debut came in 2021 with the spy thriller Special Ops 1.5: The Himmat Story. where she portrayed the character Karishma, alongside Kay Kay Menon.

In 2022, she appeared as a flight attendant in, Runway 34 (2022)

In 2023, she played 'Meeta Devi' in Netflix’s Khakee: The Bihar Chapter (2022). by Neeraj Pandey along with Avinash Tiwary, Ashutosh Rana and Karan Tacker.

Her latest role came in 2024, when she played Kiki in the crime thriller series Bad Cop (TV series) on Disney+ Hotstar. The show, directed by Aditya Datt, also featured Anurag Kashyap and Gulshan Devaiah.

Aishwarya described her journey from modeling to acting as one of overcoming stereotypes. She described her career path as being shaped by her participance in acting workshops, embracing diverse roles, and the strong scripts and collaborators in her career.

== Filmography ==
Year	Title	Role	Platform	Ref
2021	Special Ops 1.5: The Himmat Story	Karishma	Disney+ Hotstar	
2022	Runway 34	Flight Attendant		
2022	Khakee: The Bihar Chapter	Meeta Devi	Netflix	
2024	Bad Cop	Kiki	Disney+ Hotstar	
