= Kirkhope =

Kirkhope may refer to:

== Places ==
- Kirkhope Tower, Scotland
- Kirkhope, Scottish Borders, in the Scottish Borders

== People with the surname ==
- Grant Kirkhope, video game music composer
- Tony Kirkhope, film director
- Timothy Kirkhope, British politician
