= There's Always a Price Tag =

1956 crime novel by James Hadley Chase

There's Always a Price Tag is a 1956 crime thriller novel written by British author James Hadley Chase.

First edition (publ. Robert Hale)

== Synopsis ==
Small time freelance worker Glyn Nash rescues a drunken billionaire film director Dester's life, and soon gets appointed by the latter at his Hollywood residence, much against the wishes of Dester's glamorous and shady wife, Helen Dester. Glyn sees the employment as an opportunity to become rich and famous, not knowing what is in store for him.

== Plot ==
Glyn Nash, a part-time multi-talented freelance worker, rescues Hollywood director Erle Dester from being run over in a drunken state. Dester soon takes him home and appoints him as his personal assistant and chauffeur, much against the wishes of his beautiful but shady wife Helen Dester. She repeatedly warns Nash to leave and offers him money too, but this only encourages Nash to stay back and determine what is going on.

Dester takes Nash into confidence and tells him that he is a heavy drinker, broke, and will soon lose all that he owns. Nash also notes that Helen is "up to no good", and Dester has become like this only because of marrying her. Helen wants Dester to die as soon as possible for his insurance money. She tries to kill Dester many a time, but fails because of Nash being around.

Nash then decides to play a game, wherein he can get Dester's money and probably his beautiful wife too. He confronts Helen and tells her that he knows all about her, but is willing to join with her to get Dester's money. The two conspire to eliminate Dester. Unfortunately things take a different turn when one day Dester calls both of them to his room and says that he is going to kill himself, and if it can be proved as murder, then Helen will get his money after his death, but not if suicide. He also says that he has taken into confidence his lawyer and the insurance agent Maddux who will identify any fake insurance claims easily. Saying that, Dester shoots himself.

A shocked Nash and Helen decide to cover up the suicide and make it appear as murder. They hide the body in the freezer, and decide to cover up Dester's disappearance until they can think of a suitable way to make it appear as though he was murdered. They spread news that Dester is out of town on fresh business and will be returning soon. Finally Glyn comes up with the idea of making it appear as though Dester was very ill and had decided to go to the sanatorium for treatment, and on the way he and his wife were kidnapped for ransom. They also convince a housemaid, Marian, to act as witness in the house by telling her lies. They drive to a remote area, where Glyn ties Helen up and informs the police that she is missing, the plan here being that soon the news of a kidnap would spread. However, before tying Helen, he beats her black and blue to make her look injured, and accidentally ends up killing her.

To add to his amazement and shock, Nash also discovers Dester's will and sees that the latter has left everything in his name, including the insurance money. This makes things difficult as if the police find it, it would appear that Nash committed both murders to get the money. Soon more people get involved in the case, including the police chief, Maddux and Detective Steve Harmas (who has also appeared in other books of James Hadley Chase).

Nash now tries to twist the story. He hides the will, and tries to cover things up by making it appear as if Erle Dester murdered his wife and then committed suicide, saying that Helen and Dester were on their way to the Sanatorium against Dester's wishes, Dester killed Helen and then came back home and committed suicide. He even confides in Marian and tells her everything, who simply leaves the house. Nash puts Dester's preserved body from the freezer in the study and creates a suicide scenario with a fake typed suicide note. The police take note of the scene and leave. Nash then tries to escape from the city but the police soon determine what he has been up to, and Glyn Nash is arrested.

== Adaptations ==
- The 1957 black and white French production, Retour de manivelle, was based on this novel. Also known as Delitto sulla Costa Azzurra in Italy, the film starred Michèle Morgan as Helen, Daniel Gélin as Nash and Peter Van Eyck as Dester.
- A 2008 Indian version of the novel was made into a film called Maharathi, (meaning Great Warrior in Hindi) directed by Shivam Nair and starring veteran actor Naseeruddin Shah playing the role of Dester, Paresh Rawal as Glyn Nash, Om Puri as Inspector and Neha Dhupia as Helen.
- The concept has been used in Hindi detective TV serials, like Bullet, screened on Doordarshan
