= Karan Tacker =

Indian actor (born 1986)

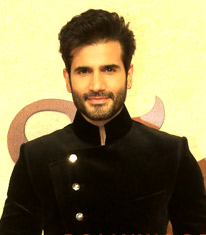
- Tacker in 2025
- Born: 11 May 1986 (age 40); Bombay, Maharashtra, India
- Occupations: Actor; host
- Years active: 2009–present

Karan Tacker (born 11 May 1986) is an Indian actor who primarily works in Hindi television and series. Tacker is best known for his portrayal of Viren Singh Vadhera in Ek Hazaaron Mein Meri Behna Hai, Farooq Ali in Special OPS and Amit Lodha IPS in Khakee: The Bihar Chapter. In 2014, he participated in Jhalak Dikhhla Jaa 7 and emerged as the 1st runner-up.

== Early life ==
Tacker was born on 11 May 1986 in Bombay (Mumbai), in a Punjabi Hindu family. He acquired a degree in Business Management before joining the television space.

== Career ==
=== Early work in television (2009–2019) ===
Tacker had his first acting appearance in the film Rab Ne Bana Di Jodi (2008). Tacker made his television debut with Love Ne Mila Di Jodi, where he played Sameer Saxena opposite Perneet Chauhan, from 2009 to 2010. From 2010 to 2011, he played Shantanu Khandelwal opposite Yashashri Masurkar in Rang Badalti Odhani.

Tacker had his career breakthrough with Ek Hazaaron Mein Meri Behna Hai, where he played Viren Singh Vadhera opposite Krystle D'Souza, from 2011 to 2013. The series earned him nomination for ITA Award for GR8! Performer Of The Year – Male.

In 2014, Tacker participated in the dance reality show Jhalak Dikhhla Jaa and emerged as the first runner up of the show. Tacker then became host for Halla Bol (2014), The Voice India (2015) and Nach Baliye (2017).

=== Success with streaming projects (2020–present) ===
Tacker expanded to web in 2020 with Special Ops, where he played an undercover agent. This marked his return to acting in a major role after 7 years after Ek Hazaaron Mein Meri Behna Hai, that ended in 2013. Saibal Chatterjee stated that he gave an "impressive performance". Divyanshi Sharma of India Today noted, "Tacker gives a fine performance and looks dashing throughout." In 2021, Tacker reprised his role in the spin off series Special Ops 1.5: The Himmat Story.

Tacker portrayed SP Amit Lodha IPS opposite Nikita Dutta in the 2022 series Khakee: The Bihar Chapter. Both Anuj Kumar and Saikat Chakraborty were appreciative of his performance adding that he "looks the part", but criticised the under development of his character.

Tacker had two releases in 2025. He first made his film debut with Tanvi the Great, portraying an army officer. A Bollywood Hungama critic found him to be "adorable" in his role. He then reprised his role in the second season of Special Ops. Chirag Sehgal of News18 noted, "Tacker gets less screen time in comparison to the first season but does his part with utmost perfection."

Tacker played the role of Indian paranormal investigator Gaurav Tiwary in, Bhay: The Gaurav Tiwari Mystery that released in December 2025 on Amazon MX Player.

== Media image ==
In Times Most Desirable Men on Television list, Tacker was placed 3rd in 2017.

== Filmography ==
=== Films ===
Year	Title	Role	Notes	Ref.
2025	Tanvi the Great	Captain Samar Raina		

=== Television ===
Year	Title	Role	Notes	Ref.
2009–2010	Love Ne Mila Di Jodi	Sameer Saxena		
2010–2011	Rang Badalti Odhani	Shantanu Khandelwal		
2011–2013	Ek Hazaaron Mein Meri Behna Hai	Viren Singh Vadhera		
2011	Iss Pyaar Ko Kya Naam Doon?	Himself	Guest appearance	
2012	Punar Vivah	Himself	Guest appearance	
2012	Teri Meri Love Stories	Himself	Guest appearance	
2013	Pyaar Ka Dard Hai Meetha Meetha Pyaara Pyaara	Himself	Guest appearance	
2014	Jhalak Dikhhla Jaa 7	Contestant	1st runner-up	

=== Web series ===
Year	Title	Role	Notes	Ref.
2020 - present	Special Ops	Farooq Ali / Amjad Sharif / Rashid Malik		
2021	Special Ops 1.5: The Himmat Story	Farooq Ali / Amjad Sharif / Rashid Malik		
2022	Khakee: The Bihar Chapter	SP Amit Lodha IPS		
2025	Special Ops 2	Farooq Ali		
2025	Bhay: The Gaurav Tiwari Mystery	Gaurav Tiwari		

=== Other appearances ===
Year	Title	Role	Notes	Ref.
2014	Halla Bol	Host		
2014	Kaun Banega Crorepati 8	Himself		
2014	Box Cricket League	Himself		
2015	Farah Ki Dawat	Himself	Episode: "Karan Special"	
2015	Killerr Karaoke Atka Toh Latkah	Himself		
2015	India's Got Talent	Himself		
2015	The Voice	Host		
2015	Strictly Come Dancing 13	Himself		
2015	Sarojini - Ek Nayi Pehal	Himself		
2015	Aaj Ki Raat Hai Zindagi	Himself		
2016	Jhalak Dikhhla Jaa 9	Himself		
2017	Nach Baliye 8	Host		
2018	The Remix	Host		
2018	Bepannah	Himself		
2018	Ace of Space 1	Himself		
2018	Naagin 3	Himself		
2019	Kitchen Champion 5	Himself		

== Awards and nominations ==
Year	Award	Category	Work	Result	Ref.
2012	Gold Awards	Most Fit Actor	—N/a	Won	
2012	Indian Television Academy Awards	GR8! Performer Of The Year – Male	Ek Hazaaron Mein Meri Behna Hai	Nominated	
2020	Gold Glam and Style Awards	Most Fit Actor	—N/a	Won	
2023	Iconic Gold Awards	Power Pack Performer	Khakee: The Bihar Chapter	Won	
