= 2017 in German television =

This is a list of German television related events from 2017.

That year the first German television drama series were produced for Amazon Prime Video (You Are Wanted) and Netflix (Dark), which was said to have ”changed the nature of TV” in the country.

== Events ==
- 9 February - Levina is selected to represent Germany at the 2017 Eurovision Song Contest with her song "Perfect Life". She is selected to be the sixty-second German Eurovision entry during Unser Song 2017 held at the Köln-Mülheim Studios in Cologne.

== Debuts ==
- 4 Blocks
- Babylon Berlin
- Bad Cop - kriminell gut
- Charité (TV series)
- Curvy Supermodel, season 2 (RTL2)
- Dark (TV series)
- Einstein (German TV series)
- Love Island (German TV series)
- Magda macht das schon!
- Nacktes Überleben - Wie wenig ist genug?
- Professor T. (German TV series)
- Das Sacher
- The Same Sky (TV series)
- The Worst Witch (2017 TV series)
- You Are Wanted

== Television shows ==
=== 1950s ===
- Tagesschau (1952–present)

=== 1960s ===
- heute (1963–present)

=== 1970s ===
- heute-journal (1978–present)
- Tagesthemen (1978–present)

=== 1980s ===
- Lindenstraße (1985–present)

=== 1990s ===
- Gute Zeiten, schlechte Zeiten (1992–present)
- Unter uns (1994–present)
- Schloss Einstein (1998–present)
- In aller Freundschaft (1998–present)
- Wer wird Millionär? (1999–present)

=== 2000s ===
- Deutschland sucht den Superstar (2002–present)
- Let's Dance (2006–present)
- Das Supertalent (2007–present)

=== 2010s ===
- The Voice of Germany (2011–present)
- Promi Big Brother (2013–present)

== Ending this year ==
- Bad Cop - kriminell gut
- Maya the Bee (TV series)
- Das Sacher

== Networks and services ==
=== Launches ===
Network	Type	Launch date	Notes	Source
Eurosport Xtra 2	Cable television	4 August		

=== Conversions and rebrandings ===
Old network name	New network name	Type	Conversion Date	Notes	Source
RTL Nitro	Nitro	Cable television	31 July		

=== Closures ===
Network	Type	End date	Notes	Sources
RTL International	Cable television	31 May		
Sky 3D	Cable television	1 July		

== See also ==
- 2017 in Germany
