= Bihar Diaries =

2018 Crime Book by Amit Lodha

- Author: Amit Lodha
- Language: English and Hindi
- Genre: Crime non-fiction
- Publisher: Penguin Books
- Publication date: July 13, 2018
- Publication place: India
- Pages: 304
- ISBN: 0143444352

Bihar Diaries: The True Story of How Bihar's Most Dangerous Criminal Was Caught is a non-fiction crime book written by Indian Police officer, Amit Lodha in 2018.

In November 2022, Netflix released the webseries Khakee: The Bihar Chapter inspired by this book.

== Plot ==
The story starts from the criminal birth of Samant Pratap (renamed), a sharpshooter of Ashok Mahto gang, earlier named as Vijay Samrat but later it was removed because Vijay Samrat is the name of a local Rashtriya Janata Dal politician.
