= Special Ops 1.5: The Himmat Story =

Indian streaming television series

- Promotional poster
- Genre: Action; Espionage; Thriller
- Created by: Neeraj Pandey
- Written by: Neeraj Pandey; Deepak Kingrani; Benazir Ali Fida
- Directed by: Neeraj Pandey; Shivam Nair
- Starring: Kay Kay Menon; Vinay Pathak; Aftab Shivdasani; Aadil Khan; Parmeet Sethi; Kali Prasad Mukherjee; Aishwarya Sushmita
- Composer: Advait Nemlekar
- Country of origin: India
- Original language: Hindi
- No. of episodes: 4

Production
- Producer: Shital Bhatia
- Production locations: India; Dubai; Ukraine
- Cinematography: Sudheer Palsane; Arvind Singh
- Editor: Praveen Kathikuloth
- Running time: 34-51 min
- Production company: Friday Storytellers

Original release
- Network: Disney+ Hotstar
- Release: 12 November 2021

Related
- Special Ops

Special Ops 1.5: The Himmat Story is a Hindi action thriller series created and directed by Neeraj Pandey for Disney+ Hotstar. The series is set inside the Special Ops Universe and stars Kay Kay Menon as Himmat Singh, a Research & Analysis Wing (R&AW) officer. The series premiered on 12 November 2021.

== Cast ==
- Kay Kay Menon as Himmat Singh
- Aftab Shivdasani as Vijay Kumar
- Vinay Pathak as SI Abbas Sheikh, Delhi Police
- Aadil Khan as Maninder Singh
- Gautami Kapoor as Sarojini
- Parmeet Sethi as Naresh Chaddha
- Kali Prasad Mukherjee as D. K. Banerjee
- Kishor Kadam as Mondal
- Vijay Vikram Singh as Naval Commodore Chintamani Sharma
- Aishwarya Sushmita as Karishma
- Shantanu Ghatak as Vinayak Shukla
- Shiv Jyoti Rajput as Anita Sharma
- Nikhat Khan as Meenakshi Sharma
- Purnendu Bhattacharya as G. P. Mathur, Himmat's boss
- Vivek Madaan as Sankalp Chaudhary
- Maria Ryaboshapka as Natasha Petrova
- Harssh A. Singh as Joint Commissioner Mahendra Chautala
- Sushil Tyagi as DIG Sushil Sharma
- Saurabh Mukhija as Bhimsain
- Ronald Mistry as Ashraful Rehman
- Basnet Romila as Boudi
- Aanup Sharma as Basheer Mirza
- Karan Tacker as Farooq Ali (cameo appearance)

== Episodes ==
No.	Title	Directed by	Written by	Original release date
1	"Aandhi"	Shivam Nair	Neeraj Pandey; Deepak Kingrani; Benazir Ali Fida	November 12, 2021
Abbas Sheikh is summoned by auditors to evaluate Himmat Singh's career as his retirement draws near. After the 2001 Parliament attack, Himmat tracks Ikhlaq Khan to Delhi. Abbas disobeys direct orders from his seniors to not be involved in this case and helps Himmat, but Ikhlaq escapes. A week later in an inquiry, both Himmat and Abbas are suspended from their jobs. Himmat coerces Joint CP Chautala to revoke Abbas' suspension, and dates a girl named Anita before disappearing. Abbas finds him on a news channel where he is in Kashmir searching for leads about Ikhlaq. Soon after, Himmat is called back by R&AW for a case on Vinayak Shukla, an attaché counsellor at the Indian High Commission of Colombo who was honey-trapped by a girl named Karishma, and highly sensitive documents have been leaked. Upon learning the truth, Shukla kills himself. Himmat is joined by Vijay Kumar, his college friend, an ex-army officer. Himmat and Vijay's boss G. P. Mathur gives them their target Maninder Singh, an ex-R&AW officer and Himmat's colleague who has gone rogue. Now their main task is to eliminate him and secure the national documents.
2	"Mere Apne"	Neeraj Pandey	Neeraj Pandey; Deepak Kingrani; Benazir Ali Fida	November 12, 2021
Himmat and Abbas interrogate fake passport agent Mondal and learn that Maninder went to London. Upon returning from Moscow, Natasha Petrova blackmailed Naval Commodore Chintamani Sharma for top-secret Naval documents. Chintamani receives an email with intimate photos and a Trojan virus is installed on his computer. Chintamani lies and travels to London to share the documents with Natasha. Upon further investigation, there appears to be an international conspiracy with Sankalp Chaudhary as the main conspirator, whom Maninder and Karishma appear to work for. Vijay decides to go to Colombo to capture Karishma while Himmat travels to London to stop Chintamani. Maninder intercepts Natasha, kills her, and steals the documents. Himmat arrives at the hotel where Chintamani is staying, but before he can start his investigation, Chintamani shoots himself. Vijay arrives in Colombo and holds Karishma at gunpoint. After a quick call between Himmat and Vijay, Maninder points a gun at Himmat.
3	"Lekin"	Shivam Nair	Neeraj Pandey; Deepak Kingrani; Benazir Ali Fida	November 12, 2021
Himmat asks Maninder why he went rogue, and he explains that on a mission to Serbia, he was captured and tortured by Serbian forces. After waiting six days, he learned that he was betrayed. He then escapes. Vijay captures Karishma and is ambushed by a group of armed men on the way to the airport. Karishma escapes with the armed men. With no leads, Himmat and Vijay return to Delhi. Himmat, Anita, Vijay, and Saroj attend dinner together. While returning from dinner, Himmat realizes that Anita is a mole and he was being tricked by her. He interrogates Anita and learns that she was coerced by Karishma three years earlier. He also finds out that Maninder is in Kyiv, Ukraine. He moves Anita to a safe house and goes to Ukraine with Vijay to eliminate Maninder. Meanwhile, Karishma appears at the stakeout point, and Vijay calls Himmat, who starts following her, while Maninder is monitoring them. Vijay is captured by Maninder and Himmat captures Karishma. Maninder calls Himmat and tells him to come to a tank factory.
4	"Ijazat"	Neeraj Pandey	Neeraj Pandey; Deepak Kingrani; Benazir Ali Fida	November 12, 2021
As Himmat arrives at the tank factory with Karishma, he finds Vijay wounded. In a face-off, Maninder shoots and kills Karishma. He is about to kill Himmat but Vijay interferes. In the resulting struggle, Maninder kills Vijay and escapes. Himmat sets out to coerce Sankalp to find Maninder and lays a trap by getting Maninder to leave for Dubai. On the flight from Kyiv to Dubai, Himmat strangles Maninder to death. He retrieves the stolen information and, upon returning to Delhi, goes directly to the safe house. Himmat blames Anita for Vijay's death. During an intense conversation, he executes Anita after she asks him to do so. After two months, a deal is agreed between Himmat and Alan Fuller after which Sankalp dies in a car explosion. Due to a successful mission, Himmat gets his job back. A year later, Himmat goes to Saroj and apologises for Vijay's death. In the present, it is shown that Himmat is with his family when he gets a call from Farooq. Farooq was kidnapped somewhere in Nepal and gives Himmat a hint.

== Production ==
The series was formally announced by Disney+ Hotstar in January 2021 with Kay Kay Menon attached to star. In the same month Aftab Shivdasani joined the cast.

=== Filming ===
The series started production in February, 2021. The series was shot in Ukraine in July 2021, with the Ukraine leg of the shoot completed in Kyiv in the same month.

== Release ==
The four-episode series premiered on Disney+ Hotstar on November 12, 2021, as part of Disney+ Day.

=== Promotion ===
A teaser of the show was released on 14 October 2021 on the social media handles of Disney+ Hotstar. The trailer was leaked online before its official release on October 19, 2021.

== Reception ==
Archika Khurana writing for The Times of India commented "Kay Kay Menon’s Himmat Singh leaves a lasting impression as a R&AW agent" rating 3 out of 5 stars.

Manik Sharma writing for Firstpost noted, "It is understandable that Special Ops 1.5 is a detour to make Himmat Singh more personable, instead of the maverick he was shown in the first season, but the story is too disjointed to pull this narrative heist off."

Udita Jhunjhunwala writing for Scroll noted that Special Ops 1.5 feels like an appetiser and a palate cleanser while we wait for the main course, because there's clearly more to come from Neeraj Pandey, Menon, Himmat Singh and his special ops team.

Bhavna Agarwal from Bollywood Bubble commented "Neeraj Pandey's approach to the story with his lenses and storyline is the strength of the prequel backed by a fluid screenplay. Kay Kay Menon returns as Himmat Singh along with Aftab Shivdasani and Vinay Pathak in pivotal roles."

Prateek Sur of Outlook India rated it 3.5 out of 5 and wrote in a positive review, "Special Ops 1.5' is just as sharp, tight, engrossing, and exhilarating as the original. The makers have strewn subtle touches of humour throughout the show with the dialogues and one-liners being so refreshing. They serve as a wonderful counterpoint to the ongoing heavy-duty spy work".

== Sequel ==
In April 2022, Neeraj Pandey confirmed that the second season of Special Ops is under production and will be released on July 18, 2025 on JioHotstar.
