= Bad Cop (TV series) =

- Official release poster
- Genre: Thriller Crime drama
- Based on: Bad Cop - kriminell gut
- Written by: Rensil D'Silva; Rehan Khan
- Directed by: Aditya Datt
- Starring: Anurag Kashyap; Gulshan Devaiah; Saurabh Sachdeva
- Country of origin: India
- Original language: Hindi
- No. of seasons: 1
- No. of episodes: 8

Production
- Executive producer: Aradhana Bhola
- Producer: Leena Tandon
- Cinematography: Anik Ram Verma
- Editor: Jitendra Dongare
- Running time: 24–35 minutes
- Production company: Fremantle

Original release
- Network: Disney+ Hotstar
- Release: 21 June 2024

Bad Cop is Hindi-language crime thriller television series written by Rensil D'Silva and Rehan Khan and directed by Aditya Datt. It stars Anurag Kashyap, Gulshan Devaiah, Harleen Sethi, Saurabh Sachdeva, Anupam K. Sinha, Subham Sharma, Shatrughan Kumar, and Aishwarya Sushmita.

The series was adapted from the German television series Bad Cop - kriminell gut.

== Cast ==
- Gulshan Devaiah in dual roles as:
  - Inspector Karan Naik, Arjun's twin brother
    - Amol Khatnani as Young Karan
  - Arjun Chavan, a thief and Karan's twin brother
    - Alok Khatnani as Young Arjun
- Harleen Sethi as SHO Devika Naik, Karan's wife
- Aishwarya Sushmita as Kirki, Arjun's partner and love interest
- Keya Ingle as Rhea Naik
- Anurag Kashyap as Kazbe
- Saurabh Sachdeva as DCP Aarif Khan, Anand Mishra's friend
- Deepraj Rana as Journalist Anand Mishra, Aarif's friend
- Krunal Pandit as Rawal, Kazbe's Lawyer
- Sandeep Shridhar Dhabale as Inspector Raahil, Karan's partner
- Deepak Kamboj as Raghav, Kazbe's nephew
- Shubham Sharma as Mandaar
- Palle Singh as Bala
- Yogi Rajora as Gurdas

== Release ==
The series was released on 21 June 2024 on OTT platform Disney+ Hotstar.

== Reception ==
Saibal Chatterjee of NDTV gave 2 stars for the series and wrote "It has no paucity of thrills and chases. But owing to the mechanical, formulaic manner of the mounting, the technical finesse that is on show is of a strictly superficial variety." Shubhra Gupta of The Indian Express stated "Snappy dialogues and action sequences abound, and like I said, each episode wraps quickly." Deepa Gahlot for Rediff.com felt the series is "not unwatchable" and opined "Even Hussain Dalal's pungent dialogue, with profanity considerably toned down, does not help lift this humourless show."

Shilajit Mitra for The Hindu opined "The performances, likewise, feel second-guessed." Reviewing for India Today, Zinia Bandyopadhyay gave 2 stars out of 5 and wrote "The series stops at being a masala potboiler that does not intrigue you. The screenplay is feeble, and the sequences are too formulaic for it to turn up as a decent thriller." Troy Ribeiro of The Free Press Journal gave some positive review on the series, stating "Yes, the writing is weak, but the dialogues written by Hussain Dalal are worth mentioning. They are dramatically classic and shine in the narrative." Sushmita Dey of Times Now wrote "It may provide fleeting entertainment". Suparna Sharma of The Week wrote " Datt, with the help of talented actors, smart cinematography and editing, is able to create interesting characters and infuse some tension in the plot."
