= Bhay: The Gaurav Tiwari Mystery =

2025 Indian television series

- Genre: Mystery; Thriller
- Inspired by: Ghost Hunter Gaurav Tiwari: The Life and Legacy of India's Foremost Paranormal Investigator by Abhirup Dhar
- Screenplay by: Arshad Syed
- Dialogues by: Arshad Syed
- Directed by: Robbie Grewal
- Starring: Karan Tacker; Kalki Koechlin
- Country of origin: India
- Original language: Hindi
- No. of seasons: 1
- No. of episodes: 8 (list of episodes)

Production
- Executive producer: Sudhir Narayan Sherigar
- Producers: Prabhleen Sandhu; Shalini Thackeray
- Cinematography: Aditya Kapur
- Editor: Archit D Rasstogi
- Running time: 22–53 minutes
- Production company: Almighty Motion Picture

Original release
- Network: Amazon MX Player
- Release: 12 December 2025

Bhay: The Gaurav Tiwari Mystery (transl. Fear: The Gaurav Tiwari Mystery) is a 2025 Indian paranormal television series directed by Robbie Grewal and written by Arshad Syed. Produced by Prabhleen Sandhu under Almighty Motion Picture, it stars Karan Tacker and Kalki Koechlin.

== Cast ==
- Karan Tacker as Gaurav Tiwari
- Kalki Koechlin as Irene Venkat
- Saloni Batra as Megha singh
- Danish Sood as Siddharth
- Nimisha Nair as Dr. Niharika
- Shubham Chaudhary as Raj
- Chinmaya Sharma as Aryaman
- Gayatri Hariharan as Sharmila
- Adarsh Marathe as Bachuaa
- Sayandeep Sengupta as Manish
- Avinash Sachdev as Vikram
- Sonal Jha as Gaurav's mother
- Babla Kochhar as Gaurav's father
- Ruchi Chaurasia as Bride ghost
- Aaloak Kapoor as Mr. Kaul (Hostel warden)

== Episodes ==
No.	Title	Original release date
1	"Ek Gehra Raaz"	12 December 2025
Gaurav Tiwari travels to the United Kingdom with aspirations of becoming a pilot, but a series of unsettling paranormal experiences during his flight training changes the course of his life. Seeking answers to these mysterious encounters, he visits The Church of Metaphysical and Humanistic Science, where he develops a fascination with paranormal research and investigation. His growing interest eventually leads him to abandon his aviation ambitions and pursue an entirely different path. Despite strong opposition from his family and widespread skepticism, Gaurav remains determined to explore the unexplained. He eventually establishes the Indian Paranormal Society (IPS), beginning his journey as a pioneering paranormal investigator in India.
2	"Jaanoge Nahi To Maanoge Kaise"	12 December 2025
The mysterious death of renowned paranormal investigator Gaurav Tiwari raises unsettling questions about his extraordinary life and the circumstances surrounding his final moments. Determined to uncover the truth, Irene, a journalist with a deeply skeptical outlook on supernatural phenomena, begins investigating his past. As she explores Gaurav's unusual experiences and his involvement in paranormal investigations, she finds herself confronting stories that challenge her rational beliefs. Moving between events from 2007 and the investigation in 2016, the episode follows Irene's search for answers as she struggles to reconcile her skepticism with the mysteries surrounding Gaurav's life and death.
3	"Khauff Ki Dastak"	12 December 2025
Gaurav Tiwari's paranormal investigations take an unsettling turn when three friends, including Siddharth, approach the Indian Paranormal Society (IPS) after encountering a mysterious child named Bachchua during a trip. The child has been appearing repeatedly wherever they go, leaving them increasingly frightened. However, Gaurav reassures them that childlike spirits are generally harmless and merely seek attention, dismissing their concerns without conducting an investigation. His judgment soon proves questionable when Bachchua unexpectedly attacks one of the friends, revealing that the haunting may be far more serious than initially believed. Meanwhile, in the present timeline, Irene continues investigating Gaurav's mysterious death, gradually gaining the confidence of IPS members. Yet, even as she uncovers more about Gaurav's extraordinary past, she remains reluctant to reveal the secrets surrounding her own life.
4	"Ek Adhura Case"	12 December 2025
Following Bachchua's unexpected attack, the three friends return to the Indian Paranormal Society (IPS), confronting Gaurav Tiwari over his earlier assurance that the spirit was harmless. Realizing his mistake, Gaurav accompanies his team and the friends to the location where the mysterious encounters began. Their investigation uncovers the tragic history of Bachchua, a young boy who died in a road accident. As the haunting intensifies, they discover that a nearby Hanuman temple offers protection from the spirit. However, their vehicle breaks down on the way, forcing another terrifying encounter. Gaurav approaches the child, who whispers something into his ear, before the group finally reaches the temple on foot. The following day, news emerges that a bus the friends had originally planned to board for a trekking trip has crashed. Gaurav reveals that Bachchua was appearing to warn them of impending danger rather than harm them. With their lives no longer threatened, the mysterious child stops appearing. Deeply influenced by this experience, Siddharth subsequently joins IPS. Seeking greater recognition and financial support for the society, Siddharth approaches the Western Herald newspaper, where he meets Irene, who dismisses paranormal investigations as superstition. However, one of her colleagues agrees to cover IPS's activities and accompanies the team to St. Peter's Cemetery. After two uneventful nights, Gaurav experiences something deeply unsettling during the third night's investigation, prompting him to abandon the case without completing it. Meanwhile, in the present timeline, growing disagreements strain Irene's relationship with IPS as her investigation into Gaurav's mysterious death continues, leaving several disturbing questions unanswered.
5	"Darr Ya Dare"	12 December 2025
Seeking to create a fresh and unconventional horror show for younger audiences, YTV begins exploring a modern approach to paranormal entertainment. The network soon discovers Gaurav Tiwari and the Indian Paranormal Society (IPS), whose investigative methods leave the producers impressed. When approached with an offer to collaborate, Gaurav initially refuses but eventually agrees under strict conditions: the show must remain authentic, avoid fabricated drama, and never treat paranormal phenomena as mere entertainment. The resulting show, Haunting with Haseena, follows three young women as they enter a reportedly haunted villa and attempt to complete a series of challenges. However, their experience takes a frightening turn when apparent paranormal disturbances prevent them from completing their tasks. Overwhelmed by the encounters, the participants begin abandoning the challenges one after another, eventually forcing Gaurav and his team to intervene and escort them out of the villa. Meanwhile, in the present timeline, Irene finally opens up to Siddharth about her mysterious past, revealing a more personal side of her story. Her revelations add another dimension to the ongoing investigation into Gaurav's unexplained death, suggesting that her involvement may be more complicated than it initially appeared. However, the episode takes an unexpected turn when Irene herself undergoes a strange and unsettling experience that challenges her deeply rooted skepticism. For the first time, she begins questioning her disbelief in the supernatural, marking a significant shift in her journey from a determined non-believer toward someone willing to acknowledge the possibility of paranormal phenomena.
6	"Wo Kaun Thee"	12 December 2025
Following their successful television appearance, Gaurav Tiwari and the Indian Paranormal Society (IPS) become a nationwide sensation, gaining widespread recognition for their investigations into unexplained phenomena. However, as their popularity continues to grow, the team encounters increasingly disturbing cases that challenge their understanding of the paranormal. Meanwhile, in the present timeline, IPS members visit Irene's home to investigate the strange experiences that have begun challenging her long-held skepticism. Unable to detect anything unusual during their initial investigation, the team installs surveillance cameras to monitor potential paranormal activity before leaving. As Irene continues exploring Gaurav's mysterious death, her own past emerges as a crucial piece of the puzzle. She learns from a close friend that her former boyfriend, who was also that friend's brother, had interviewed Gaurav shortly before taking his own life. During the interview, Gaurav appeared deeply troubled and abruptly walked away before it could be completed. More disturbingly, he had seemingly abandoned his famous belief that "Knowledge Cancels Fear," replacing it with the unsettling statement, "Knowledge Creates Fear." This revelation suggests a mysterious connection between Irene's personal tragedy and Gaurav's final days, one that even the IPS members were unaware of. Meanwhile, another disturbing investigation unfolds in Mumbai, where Anmol, the new owner of an apartment, initially experiences nothing unusual while living alone. However, shortly after his sister arrives, inexplicable and frightening incidents begin occurring inside the residence. When IPS members investigate the property, they sense an unusually threatening presence and realize that the situation may be beyond their capabilities. Recognizing the seriousness of the case, they contact Gaurav, who is in Delhi attending a speaking engagement, and request his immediate assistance. As the mysterious apartment investigation intensifies and Irene uncovers troubling details about Gaurav's past, the episode deepens the mystery surrounding the events that preceded his unexplained death.
7	"Sach Ki Talaash"	12 December 2025
8	"Woh Tujhe Nahi Chhodega"	12 December 2025

== Production ==
The series was announced on Amazon MX Player. It is inspired from Abhirup Dhar's Ghost Hunter Gaurav Tiwari: The Life and Legacy of India's Foremost Paranormal Investigator (2021).

Principal photography of the series commenced in October 2024, and concluded in April 2025. Post-production of the series began in August 2025.

== Release ==
The series was made available to stream on Amazon MX Player on 12 December 2025.

== Reception ==
Archika Khurana from The Times of India rated the series 3.5 out of 5 stars and said that "A gripping, atmospheric watch—best suited for fans of investigative, psychological, and grounded supernatural storytelling". Arpita Sarkar of OTT Play gave the series 2 stars out of 5 and stated that "The ghosts aren't scary, the cases lack suspense, and the emphasis on paranormal investigation overshadows the potential for deeper explorations into Gaurav's personal life. The real-life footage adds a little interest, but overall, the series struggles to captivate or terrify. " Vinamra Mathur of Firstpost rated 3.5/5 stars and said that "It’s a show that jolts you and forces you to think twice before saying ghosts do not exist."

Bollywood Hungama gave 3 stars out of 5 and said that ""On the whole, BHAY - THE GAURAV TIWARI MYSTERY is an intriguing paranormal thriller powered by an unusual premise, a solid investigative hook and Karan Tacker’s terrific central performance. Sadly, a show with such mass appeal has dropped with limited promotion. Hence, it’ll need a strong word of mouth to catch the attention of its vast target audience."
