= St Xavier's School, Jaipur =

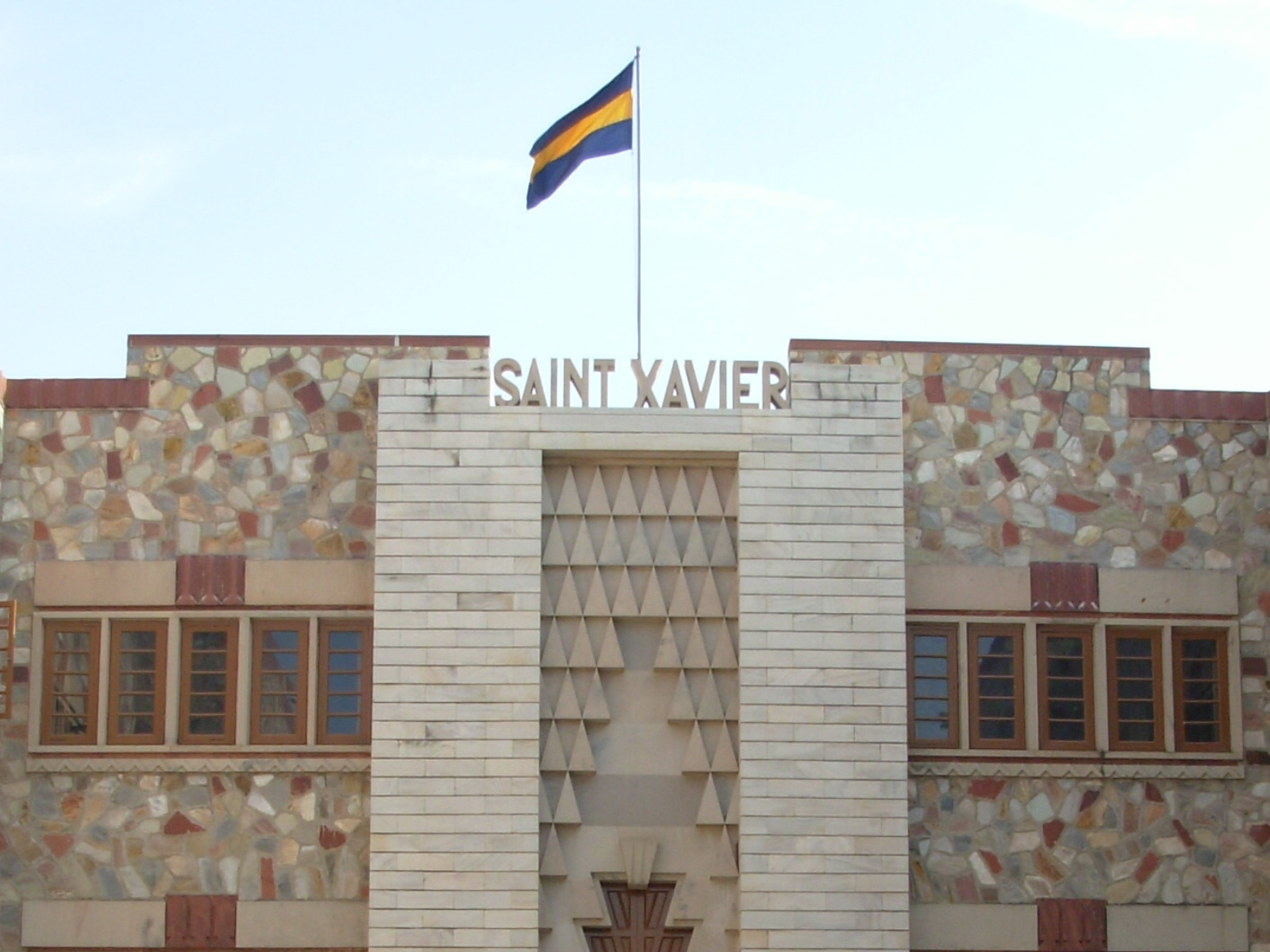
- The facade of main school building

Location
- Bhagwan Das Road; Jaipur, Rajasthan; India
- Coordinates: 26°54′45″N 75°48′34″E

Information
- Type: Private primary and secondary school
- Motto: Latin: Deus Fortitudo Mea (God is my strength)
- Religious affiliation: Catholicism
- Denomination: Jesuit
- Established: 1941; 85 years ago
- Principal: Fr. Dominic(since 2018)
- Teaching staff: 100+
- Grades: 1 -12
- Gender: Co-educational (since 1989)
- Enrollment: 3,500+
- Colors: Blue and gold
- Newspaper: X Rays
- Website: xaviersjaipur.edu.in

St Xavier's Senior Secondary School is a private Catholic secondary school located in Jaipur, in Rajasthan in north-western India. The school was established by the Jesuits in 1943 in this name. The Jesuits took over St. Mary's Boys School in 1943, which had recently been founded in 1941. In the year 2016, St Xavier's School, Jaipur had celebrated its 75th anniversary.

== History ==
The school was established in 1943. Following a visit to St Xavier's School, Patna, Mirza Ismail, the prime minister of Jaipur State, wished to have a similar institution in his home city, Jaipur. As a result, the Jesuits took over management of St. Mary's Boys School, which had been founded two years earlier, in 1941. The school became co-educational in 1989.

== Notable alumni ==
- Lt. Amit Bhardwaj, a soldier martyred in the Kargil War
- Rajiv Mehrishi, Comptroller and Auditor General of India
- Rohit Bohra, Politician and Businessman
- Pratap Bhanu Mehta, vice-chancellor of Ashok University
- Raghubir Singh, photographer
- Asrani, Indian Actor.
- Gaurav Munjal, co-founder and CEO, Unacademy
- Amit Lodha, IPS officer and author
- Shashindra Pal Tyagi, 20th Chief of Air Staff of the Indian Air Force
- Vikrant Bhargava, co-founder, Party Gaming
- Admiral Madhvendra Singh, former Chief of Naval Staff of the Indian Navy
- Piyush Pandey, Executive Chairman & Creative Director, South Asia Ogilvy & Mather India
- (Late) Mr. Rakesh Hooja, IAS, Director-General, Indian Institute of Public Administration

== See also ==
- List of Jesuit schools
- List of schools in Rajasthan
