= Retour de manivelle =

- Theatrical release poster
- Directed by: Denys de La Patellière
- Screenplay by: Denys de La Patellière; Michel Audiard (dialogue)
- Based on: the novel There's Always a Price Tag by James Hadley Chase
- Produced by: Jean-Paul Guibert; Claude Hauser (assistant)
- Starring: Michèle Morgan; Daniel Gélin; Michèle Mercier
- Cinematography: Pierre Montazel
- Edited by: Georges Alépée; Jacqueline Thiédot
- Music by: Maurice Thiriet
- Production companies: Cinematografica Associati (CI.AS.); Intermondia Films
- Distributed by: Rank Organisation
- Release date: 18 September 1957
- Running time: 118 minutes
- Country: France
- Language: French

Retour de manivelle is a 1957 French crime drama film directed by Denys de La Patellière who co-wrote screenplay with Michel Audiard, based on the 1956 novel There's Always a Price Tag by James Hadley Chase. The film stars Michèle Morgan, Daniel Gélin and Michèle Mercier.

== Synopsis ==
Penniless painter Robert Mabillon rescues rich man Eric Freminger one evening, when he is trying to throw himself under the wheels of a car. After having gotten quite drunk, Mabillon proposes to renew his luxurious villa in Saint-Jean-Cap on the French Riviera. Nevertheless, Freminger convinces him to become his driver. The same night, Mabillon has witnessed a violent dispute between his host and his seductive wife, Helen. Some time later, he receives a visit by the latter, its intimate ordered to leave as soon as possible to their homes ...

== Cast ==
- Michèle Morgan: Hélène Fréminger
- Daniel Gélin: Robert Montillon
- Michèle Mercier: Jeanne
- François Chaumette: Charles Babin
- Pierre Leproux: M. Bost, le créancier
- Jean Olivier: L' inspecteur-adjoint (as Jean Ollivier)
- Hélène Roussel: Une secrétaire
- Peter van Eyck: Eric Fréminger
- Bernard Blier: Le commissaire Plantavin

== Production crew ==
- Director: Denys de La Patellière
- Writer: Denys de La Patellière after the work of James Hadley Chase
- Producer: Jean-Paul Guibert
- Director of photography: Pierre Montazels

Production companies are Cinematografica Associata (Italy) and Films Intermondia (France).
