= Chandana Sharma =

Indian actress

- Born: Mumbai, India
- Occupation: Actress
- Years active: 1998–present
- Mother: Anjana Bhowmik
- Relatives: Nilanjana Sengupta (sister); Veerendra (father-in-law); Jisshu Sengupta (brother-in-law)

Chandana Sharma (born 7 August 1982) is an Indian television actress. She is the daughter of Anjana Bhowmik. Her sister Nilanjana Sharma is also an actress. She made her debut in director Rabi Kinagi's Premi.

== Television career ==
She started her acting career with the role of Aditi in the popular TV show Just Mohabbat which aired on Sony TV. While filming Just Mohabbat, she bagged another role in the show Dil Hai Ki Manta Nahin opposite Vishal Singh, she played Diya, who falls in love with a man who is struggling with love in his life. She also starred in Dhak Dhak in Dubai on 9X Channel.

She played the role of Tara Arora in the serial Yeh Dil Chahe More telecast on STAR One. She was the anchor of a lifestyle show Home Shanti Home on STAR One.

She worked in her hit show Love Ne Mila Di Jodi as a strong independent women Damini Gujral, that aired on STAR One. She also made an appearance in one episode of Rishta.com on Sony TV and in Ssshhhh...Phir Koi Hai.

She has also shot an ad film for "Airtel" with Shah Rukh Khan.

== Filmography ==
- Premi (Bengali film 2004)
- Mumbai Mast Kalandar (Marathi film 2011)
- Criminal Justice: Behind Closed Doors (Hindi web series 2020)

== Television ==
=== Television ===
Year	Series	Role	Language	Notes
1998-2000	Just Mohabbat	Aditi	Hindi	Sony TV
2002	Dil Hai Ki Manta Nahin	Diya	Hindi	
2006	Yeh Dil Chahe More	Tara Arora	Hindi	STAR One
2007	Ssshhhh...Koi Hai	Episodic role	Hindi	STAR Plus
2007-08	Dhak Dhak in Dubai		Hindi	9X
	Home Shanti Home	Herself (Anchor)	Hindi	STAR One
2009-10	Love Ne Mila Di Jodi	Damini Prithvi Saxena (née Gujral)	Hindi	STAR One
2010	Rishta.com		Hindi	STAR One
