= Special Ops (TV series) =

Indian television series

- Promotional poster
- Genre: Action; Espionage; Thriller
- Created by: Neeraj Pandey
- Written by: Neeraj Pandey; Deepak Kingrani; Benazir Ali Fida
- Directed by: Neeraj Pandey; Shivam Nair
- Starring: Kay Kay Menon; Vinay Pathak; Karan Tacker; Vipul Gupta; Muzamil Ibrahim; Meher Vij; Saiyami Kher; Divya Dutta; Revathi Pillai; Sajjad Delafrooz
- Composer: Advait Nemlekar
- Country of origin: India
- Original language: Hindi
- No. of seasons: 2
- No. of episodes: 15

Production
- Producer: Shital Bhatia
- Production locations: India; Turkey; Azerbaijan; Jordan
- Cinematography: Sudheer Palsane; Arvind Singh; Dimo Popov
- Editor: Praveen Kathikuloth
- Running time: 44–55 minutes
- Production company: Friday Storytellers

Original release
- Network: Disney+ Hotstar
- Release: 17 March 2020 – present

Related
- Special Ops 1.5: The Himmat Story

Special Ops is an Indian Hindi-language action espionage thriller television series for Hotstar Specials created and directed by Neeraj Pandey, with Shivam Nair serving as a co-director. Pandey also produced the series under Friday Storytellers, a division of his production house, for providing content to the digital medium. It stars Kay Kay Menon as Himmat Singh, a senior officer of the Research & Analysis Wing (R&AW), forms a team of five agents, in order to track down a person, who is the mastermind of the terror attacks which took place in India.

Neeraj Pandey eventually conceptualised the idea of the script in late 2010, with the series eventually scheduled to be aired on Star Plus, which however did not materialise. He later revived the project in August 2019. Shooting of the series took place in India, and some scenes were filmed in Turkey, Jordan, the United Arab Emirates and Azerbaijan. The cinematography and editing were handled by Sudheer Palsane, Arvind Singh and Praveen Kathikuloth, whereas Advait Nemlekar composed the background score.

Special OPS was released through Hotstar on 17 March 2020. The series received positive response from critics. It also received eight nominations at the inaugural Filmfare OTT Awards, winning three of them. Pandey had transformed the series into a franchise, with the second instalment Special Ops 1.5: The Himmat Story released on 12 November 2021. The second season was released on 18 July 2025.

== Premise ==
The series follows Himmat Singh (Menon) of the Research and Analysis Wing who finds similar patterns in terrorist attacks and is convinced a single person is behind all the attacks. His task force team of five agents living in various parts of the world aim to catch the mastermind.

== Cast ==
=== Main ===
Character	Portrayed by	Season 1	Season 2
Himmat Singh	Kay Kay Menon	Main	Main
Farooq Ali / Amjad Sharif / Rashid Malik	Karan Tacker	Main	Main
SI Abbas Sheikh	Vinay Pathak	Main	Main
Avinash	Muzammil Ibrahim	Main	Main
Juhi Kashyap	Saiyami Kher	Main	Main
Balakrishna "Bala" Reddy	Vipul Gupta	Main	
Ruhani Sayyed	Meher Vij (Season 1); Shikha Talsania (Season 2)	Main	Main
Saroj	Gautami Kapoor	Main	Main
Pari	Revathi Pillai	Main	Main
Hafiz Ali / Ikhlaq Khan	Sajjad Delafrooz	Main	
Subramanyam	Prakash Raj		Main
Sudheer Awasthi / The Collector	Tahir Raj Bhasin		Main
Ismail Hassan	Rajat Kaul	Main	
Sonya	Sana Khan	Main	
Dr. Piyush Bhargava	Arif Zakaria		Main
Naresh Chaddha	Parmeet Sethi	Main	Main
D.K. Bannerjee	Kali Prasad Mukherjee	Main	Main
Virendra Bakshi	Dalip Tahil		Main
Vinod Shekhawat	Tota Roy Chowdhury		Main
Dr. Harminder Gill	Kamakshi Bhatt		Main
Abhay Singh	Vikkas Manaktala		Main

=== Recurring ===
- Tushar Dutt as Ravinder "Taxi"
- Mir Sarwar as Hamid (cameo appearance)
- Sharad Kelkar as IB officer Surya Kumar (extended cameo appearance)
- Divya Dutta as Sadia Qureshi
- Pakkhi Gupta as Farah Qureshi
- S. M. Zaheer as Noor Baksh
- K. C. Shankar as Wasim Karachiwala / Firdaus Sheikh / Jalaal Mansoor
- Hetal Puniwala as Javed Khalil
- Ajit Shidhaye as ISI Chief
- Vaansh Goswami as Muhammad
- Pawan Chopra as Chintan, Himmat's boss
- Bikramjeet Kanwarpal as G. P. Mathur
- Darren E. Scott as Zhang
- Aishwary Sharma as Ajmal Kasab
- Rajendra Chawla as Illiyaas Hassan
- Alok Pandey as Pappu Haramzada
- Devas Dixit as Lallan
- Tanaya Sachdeva as Aditi Rao, daughter of Indian ambassador in Turkey
- Sohaila Kapur as Sujata Thapar
- Bijendra Gupta as Habib Naik
- Rahul Vora as Zaheer Raza
- Abhiroy Singh as Mansoor
- Prashantt Guptha as Salim
- Ayush Tandon as Suhail
- Anuj Sharma as Chaudhary
- Yelsin as Kemaal
- Rajeev Mishra as Mehta
- Rohit Tannan as Moderator for Indo-Pak Meet
- Yelsei as Vladamir
- Salim Siddiqui as R&AW Agent Wasim, Muzaffarabad
- Ashutosh Shukla as Sahil Kashyap

== Episodes ==
=== Series overview ===
Series	Episodes	Originally released	
Series	Episodes	First released	Last released
1	8	17 March 2020	17 March 2020
2	7	18 July 2025	18 July 2025

=== Season 1 (2020) ===
The episodes were titled, as a tribute, after various Bollywood films by series creator Neeraj Pandey who served as an episode director on an alternating pattern with co-director Shivam Nair. The films referenced include Kaagaz Ke Phool (1959), Guide (1965), Mughal-e-Azam (1960), Hum Kisise Kum Naheen (1977), Chaudhvin Ka Chand (1960), Qurbani (1980), Shatranj ke Khiladi (1977) and Sholay (1975).

No.	Title	Directed by	Written by	Original release date
1	"Kaagaz Ke Phool"	Shivam Nair	Neeraj Pandey, Deepak Kingrani & Benazir Ali Fida	17 March 2020
In 2001, five terrorists in a dilapidated house attack the Parliament of India and die during the attack. In the present day, Himmat Singh attends the R&AW audit meeting to explain "miscellaneous" expenses of 28 crores incurred in the last 11 years, on the Middle-East desk. He explains that he had planted agents in five countries and those funds were utilised for their needs but he refuses to reveal their identities. Later his superiors ask him about his theory on 2001 Parliament attack in which he was a part of the investigations. Himmat finds the shop name in the dry fruits packets the terrorists were carrying and asks Abbas to investigate, from which he finds out that the sixth guy who bought the dry fruits was living near a mosque. Himmat and Abbas reach to the place and start searching, they notice smoke coming out of the window as the sixth guy burns all his things and escapes. As they reach the house Himmat finds his Pakistani passport which was half burnt with no details. Farooq (Karan) calls Himmat and informs that he found Ikhlaq Khan in UAE.
2	"Guide"	Neeraj Pandey	Neeraj Pandey, Deepak Kingrani & Benazir Ali Fida	17 March 2020
Farooq suspects about Ikhlaq khan and informs Himmat. And spents time with Soniya. Flashback shows that in 2004, Himmat meets Farooq who then was a student. Back in present in the investigation Himmat told he got an intel about 26/11 terror attack and sent to investigate kasab. There he believed that Ikhlaq khan is connected with that terror attack too. With the help of his team he operates "Operation Smiley" with Farooq leads the charge, they captured Ikhlaq khan's right-hand man Wasim Karachiwala from Dubai.
3	"Mughal-E-Azam"	Shivam Nair	Neeraj Pandey, Deepak Kingrani & Benazir Ali Fida	17 March 2020
Telecom Minister, Sujata Thapar appoints Abbas to keep an eye on Himmat. At investigation Himmat reveals that in 2008 upon killing Wasim Karachiwala Farooq decides to stay back in UAE. In 2012 he got to Illiyas Hassan, who was the driver of Wasim. From him he learnt about Ismail Hassan a business tycoon, who invests Hafiz Ali's money in market to fund terrorist organisations. Farooq as Amjad tries to get closer to Ismail. Hafiz executes Ismail's younger brother Abu. Meanwhile Himmat is ambushed while returning from the inquiry.
4	"Hum Kisi Se Kam Nahi"	Neeraj Pandey	Neeraj Pandey, Deepak Kingrani & Benazir Ali Fida	17 March 2020
Himmat survived the attack with minor injuries. Four assets and four tasks. Himmat's team is challenged to test their mettle and see if they are ready for the storm coming their way. Hafiz got a tip about Himmat. Farooq getting closer to Hafiz. Himmat causes a bomb blast in Rawalpindi and blames Jamaat to freeze their funds and assets.
5	"Chaudvin Ka Chand"	Shivam Nair	Neeraj Pandey, Deepak Kingrani & Benazir Ali Fida	17 March 2020
During the Heated Argument for the funds of Operation Himmat brings the name of Telecom Minister for a 250cr. scam. Himmat hints a possible bomb blast in Delhi.Farooq's long wait comes to an end and he's face-to-face with Hafiz. Saroj informs Abbas that Himmat's life is in danger. Abbas learns that Telecom Minister is behind the attack on Himmat and warns her. Farooq poses as Rashid in front of Hafiz and agrees to help him on his deal. Farooq senses Ikhlaq khan will be on the deal so, Baku is added to the Special Ops map and new players are revealed. A woman in delhi is shown with a suicide bomber jacket as Himmat hints a possible bomb blast.
6	"Qurbani"	Neeraj Pandey	Neeraj Pandey, Deepak Kingrani & Benazir Ali Fida	17 March 2020
Hafiz, Ismail, Farooq reaches the oil fields. Himmat's team reaches Baku, assisted by Kemaal devised a strategy to eliminate Ikhlaq khan. Avinash and Juhi sets out to complete the task but, Ikhlaq does not comes out of the car, signs the deal and leaves. Himmat has no choice but to abort the mission. Himmat decides abduct Hafiz and orders his team the same. Due to absence in the inquiry, Himmat's funds are frozen by Chaddha and Banerjee. Meanwhile in the wedding the team attempts to abduct Hafiz. But, the attempt foiled as Hafiz kills Bala.
7	"Shatranj Ke Khiladi"	Shivam Nair	Neeraj Pandey, Deepak Kingrani & Benazir Ali Fida	17 March 2020
Bala is killed and due to suspicion the rest of the team forced to leave to their locations. Abbas finds a link about Ikhlaq khan captures the person and informs Himmat. Hafiz smells a mole and suspects Farooq. It was revealed that Jamaat is planning the bomb blast in Delhi. Farooq finds a pawn to survive another day. Himmat meets special IB officer Surya kumar. He was incharge of delegation of defence minister from Islamabad. Himmat shares his bomb blast hint about Surya. Surya agrees to help Himmat. Farooq requests Himmat to take one more shot at Hafiz as he leaves for Islamabad in 24 hours. Himmat assembled remaining team to complete the mission. Farooq tricks Ismail and ambushed in the mall, Soniya is killed in the process. Russians abducts Kemaal and investigates, as per Himmat's instructions Kemaal takes Ismail's name hence Hafiz thought Ismail was the mole. Farooq saves Ismail from that ambush. Where Ismail reveals about the blast in Delhi. And that mystery woman is none other than Hafiz's wife Sadiya, she would complete the blast. And she along with her sister discuss about jihad.
8	"Sholay"	Neeraj Pandey	Neeraj Pandey, Deepak Kingrani & Benazir Ali Fida	17 March 2020
Ismail mentions Ikhlaq khan to Farooq, He shifts Ismail to a safe house. Farooq passed the information to Himmat. In the flashback, it was revealed that Sadia and her sister Farah were victims of 2013 Muzaffarnagar Hindu Muslim riots. Himmat investigates Abbas' link Habib, he identifies Hafiz as Ikhlaq khan and Sadia is Ikhlaq's wife. Habib found Sadia in the refugee camp and hands over to Jamaat. Where Jamaat would use her as a suicide bomber. Farooq soon realises Ikhlaq and Hafiz are the same person. Ikhlaq invites Farooq to Islamabad. Ravinder killed Ismail, Bakhtiyar is still in investigation. Himmat coarced Chaddha to arrange the fund for the final task. Sadia, Farah are in the spot, Pakistan Minister's chief security Mansoor helps Farah to go through the hall. Himmat and team assembles for the task. Farooq and lkhlaq out for Islamabad. On the way Bakhtiyar informs Ikhlaq about Farooq's real identity and executes Ravinder. Avinash and Ruhani ambushed Ikhlaq and killed all the securities. Himmat confronts Ikhlaq khan, Farooq killed Ikhlaq. From his phone the team recovered Sadia and Farah. Surya learns Mansoor helping cause the blast, shots Mansoor dead. Himmat immediately informs Surya, he found Sadia and Farah, quickly separated from the crowd, found that they did not wear any bomber jacket. The talk goes as per schedule. And in the credit it was shown that Soniya is alive.

=== Season 2 (2025) ===
No.	Title	Directed by	Written by	Original release date
1	"Friday"	Neeraj Pandey	Neeraj Pandey, Deepak Kingrani and Benazir Ali Fida	18 July 2025
Al scientist Dr Bhargav's abduction from a tech summit and a senior R&AW officer's killing in Delhi push Himmat Singh to realise the beginning of a silent war.
2	"Saturday"	Shivam Nair	Neeraj Pandey, Deepak Kingrani and Benazir Ali Fida	18 July 2025
Probing Chaddha and Banerjee, Himmat learns about Shekhawat's mission. Subramanyam pressures Himmat to grab a bank defaulter. Farooq goes to Athens to locate another Al scientist.
3	"Sunday"	Neeraj Pandey	Neeraj Pandey, Deepak Kingrani and Benazir Ali Fida	18 July 2025
Avinash finds a critical lead in Budapest. Himmat learns that the attacks are part of a covert cyber war by China and a larger digital offensive designed to destabilise India.
4	"Monday"	Shivam Nair	Neeraj Pandey, Deepak Kingrani and Benazir Ali Fida	18 July 2025
Avinash and Juhi head to Dominica to trace Jignesh Dholakia, who Subramanyam wants arrested at any cost. Meanwhile, Himmat's daughter, Pari, finds long-buried secrets.
5	"Tuesday"	Neeraj Pandey	Neeraj Pandey, Deepak Kingrani and Benazir Ali Fida	18 July 2025
As the web tightens, Himmat suspects a mole within, which leads him to the Collector. Meanwhile, Abbas is tasked with digging into Subramanyam.
6	"Wednesday"	Shivam Nair	Neeraj Pandey, Deepak Kingrani and Benazir Ali Fida	18 July 2025
Himmat pieces together the identity of Sudheer Awasthi, who is pulling the strings of the imminent cyber warfare. Later, he finds the mole leaking internal information.
7	"Thursday"	Neeraj Pandey	Neeraj Pandey, Deepak Kingrani and Benazir Ali Fida	18 July 2025
With the clock ticking and the nation hanging by a thread, Himmat and his core squad brace themselves before Sudheer's final phase goes live with the help of Dr Bhargav.

== Production ==
=== Development ===
On 15 January 2019, the streaming platform Hotstar, announced its foray to original content production exclusively for the service, with Star India, the parent company of Hotstar, tied up with 15 Indian filmmakers for creating the shows for its label called Hotstar Specials. Pandey had started a new division Friday Storytellers, a subsidiary of his production house Friday Filmworks, for digital content providers, in which the series is produced.

The series is developed as an eight-hour story which is inspired by nineteen years worth events of national significance by Pandey along with Deepak Kingrani and Benazir Ali Fida. Shivam Nair was served as the co-director. He initially pitched the idea of the series in 2010, with Star India's head Gaurav Bannerjee, offering to premiere the show on Star Plus, but failed to materialise later. The project was eventually announced with Kay Kay Menon being offered to play the protagonist, on 6 August 2019, and the rest of the cast and crew members were finalised in the same month.

=== Filming ===
The principal photography of the series was kickstarted in mid-August 2019. Shivam Nair took charge of helming the major portions of the show taking place in India, and Pandey was directing the rest of the sequences. The show has recreated Parliament of India for filming 2001 Indian Parliament attack portions which were dealt for the first time in film history. Apart from India the show is filmed in Turkey,Jordan, United Arab Emirates and Azerbaijan. Pandey eventually stated that the shooting of the series in Delhi was more expensive, as the team needed to build sets and also use visual effects, as the story needs heavy mounting, and hence filmed in international locations.

== Release ==
A promotional video featuring between the scenes footage of filming was released on 23 February 2020. The teaser poster was released on 25 February 2020, followed by the trailer of the series, which was dropped on the same day at a press conference held in Mumbai, attended by the cast and crew. On 1 March 2020, the makers announced that the series will be premiered on Hotstar on 17 March 2020, where it will be made accessible for viewers who enabled the VIP subscription method, in the streaming platform. On 15 March 2020, the second trailer of the series was released, which confirmed the release on the said date. However, Hotstar eventually released the first episode, earlier ahead of the scheduled date, on 16 March 2020, followed by the other consecutive episodes. The series was premiered in seven Indian languages – Tamil, Telugu, Bengali, Malayalam, Marathi and Kannada, along with its Hindi original version on the said date. The teaser of second season was released on 15 May 2025. The official trailer was later released on 16 June 2025 at a press conference in Mumbai. Originally slated for release on 11 July 2025, the second season was later released on 18 July 2025.

== Reception ==
=== Critical response ===
Special OPS received mostly positive response from critics. Rohan Naahar of Hindustan Times stated "Neeraj Pandey and Kay Kay Menon deliver the first Hotstar original series almost worth the self-isolation." Sana Farzeen of The Indian Express stated "With some impressive performances and a compelling tale, Special Ops deserves a watch". Saibal Chatterjee of NDTV gave three out of five stars to the show stating "Special Ops, is a sprawling espionage actioner that takes its own sweet time to glide towards two suspenseful climactic build-ups." Archika Khurana of The Times of India too gave three out of five and stated "Special Ops' could have been a winner all together if it was more focussed. Still, this setup of spies is better than some of its counterparts, and is binge worthy too."

Stutee Ghosh of The Quint stated "Special Ops is uneven in its pace and falters in between but it’s also a proof of Neeraj Pandey’s skill that despite these flaws he has created a series that has enough drama to keep us hooked", and gave three out of five stars. Divyanshi Sharma of India Today, gave a mixed review stating "Special Ops has some stellar performances, which was put down by, forced slow-motion scenes, predictable twists, absence of logic and poorly executed story." Nandini Ramanath of Scroll.in opined "Special Ops lands on the better side of Bard of Blood, but doesn’t match the entertainment value of The Family Man [...] While the Parliament attack is well executed, the hand-to-hand combat scenes are unmistakably choreographed."

Avinash Ramachandran of The New Indian Express commented "Despite the supporting cast being underwritten, a few setbacks in the pacing, and the oh-so-convenient twists, the show gets a lot right". Firstpost chief critic Pratishruti Ganguly gave two out of five and stated "Perhaps it would have fared better for Special Ops to do away with the frills and focus on the titular special operation right from the get go [sic]... However, it could well be a binge-worthy series in the times of self-quarantine."

=== Accolades ===
Award	Date of ceremony	Category	Nominee	Result	Ref.
Filmfare OTT Awards	19 December 2020	Best Drama Series	Special OPS	Nominated	
Filmfare OTT Awards	19 December 2020	Best Director (Drama)	Neeraj Pandey and Shivam Nair	Nominated	
Filmfare OTT Awards	19 December 2020	Best Actor (Drama)	Kay Kay Menon	Nominated	
Filmfare OTT Awards	19 December 2020	Best Supporting Actress (Drama)	Divya Dutta	Won	
Filmfare OTT Awards	19 December 2020	Best Background Score	Advait Nemlekar	Nominated	
Filmfare OTT Awards	19 December 2020	Best Original Soundtrack	Advait Nemlekar	Won	
Filmfare OTT Awards	19 December 2020	Best Art Direction	Sandeep Sharad Ravade	Nominated	
Filmfare OTT Awards	19 December 2020	Best Costume Designer	Falguni Thakore	Nominated	
Filmfare OTT Awards	19 December 2020	Best Editor	Praveen Kathikuloth	Won	

== Future ==
In a live chat session on Instagram, with Kay Kay Menon, Karan Tacker and Neeraj Pandey in May 2020, the director hinted of the second season of the series which is yet to be conceptualised. Although an official announcement of the second season was made in April, Pandey hinted that the series will be "bigger than that of the first season".

In January 2021, Pandey announced that the works on the second season will be completed, before starting the production of Ajay Devgn's Chanakya. He eventually converted the series into a franchise and on 22 January 2021, the makers announced the second instalment in the franchise titled Special Ops 1.5: The Himmat Story. The series which revolves around the backstory of Himmat Singh (Menon) as a r&aw officer, is a prequel to the first season. The series consisted of four episodes with a runtime of nearly one-hour and was premiered on Disney+ Hotstar on 12 November 2021. The second season was officially released on 18 July 2025.

== See also ==
- Srikant Tiwari (The Family Man), an Indian fictional secret agent character which appeared in The Family Man (Indian TV series), almost a year before Special Ops.
