= Kali Prasad Mukherjee =

Indian film and television actor

- Born: 1 August 1962 (age 64); India
- Occupation: Actor
- Years active: 1996–present

Kali Prasad Mukherjee is an Indian film and television actor who is best known for playing supporting roles in Bollywood films and Indian soap operas. Mukherjee has been active as an actor since 1996.

== Filmography ==
- Note: All films are in Hindi unless otherwise noted.

Year	Film	Character	Language
2005	Sehar	Rituraj/Hemraj Chaudhary	
2008	A Wednesday!	Ibrahim Khan	
2009	Agyaat	Shakky	
2010	Lafangey Parindey	Kasim	
2016	Saat Uchakkey		
2016	M.S. Dhoni: The Untold Story	Animesh Kumar Ganguly	
2018	Aiyaary	Bhima	
2018	Missing	Mysterious Guest	
2018	Kanaa	Patel	Tamil film scenes reused in Kousalya Krishnamurthy (2019)
2022	Bhool Bhulaiyaa 2	Debanshu Chatterjee	

== Television ==
Year	Show	Character	Citation(s)
1997	Tesu Ke Phool	Nitish Sharma	
1997–2000	Jai Hanuman	ShaniDev, Kaliyug	
2001	Manzilein Apani Apani	KaliPrasad	
2002	Kammal	Jayantilal Jajoo	
2002–2003	Kohi Apna Sa	CBI Inspector	
2003	Kya Hadsaa Kya Haqeeqat	Mohan/Netri	
2004	K. Street Pali Hill	Jai Singh	
2008	Kahaani Hamaaray Mahaabhaarat Ki	Shakuni	
2009–2011	Laagi Tujhse Lagan	Ganpat	
2010–2011	Tere Liye	Shekhar Ganguly	
2011–2012	Shobha Somnath Ki	Mahant Rudhrabhadra	
2012–2013	Pavitra Rishta	Balan Singh	
2013–2014	Rangrasiya	Dilsher Ranawat	
2014–2015	Yeh Dil Sun Raha Hai	Bachcha Singh	
2015–2016	Yeh Kahan Aa Gaye Hum	Upamanyu Chatterjee	
2018–2019	Kasautii Zindagii Kay	Rajesh Sharma	
2020	Special OPS	D.K. Bannerjee	
2021	Special Ops 1.5: The Himmat Story	D.K. Bannerjee	
2022	Khakee: The Bihar Chapter	Ravinder Mukhiya	
2025	Special Ops 2	D.K. Bannerjee	
