= Vijay Vikram Singh =

Indian actor

- Born: 26 November 1977 (age 48)
- Occupations: Actor; voiceover artist
- Years active: 2006–present
- Known for: Bigg Boss

Vijay Vikram Singh (born 26 November 1977) is an Indian voice-over artist and actor. He is the narrator of the Indian television series Bigg Boss, as well as numerous other reality shows, and advertisements.

== Career ==
Vijay Vikram Singh started his voiceover career with Dance India Dance, and debuted as an actor in The Family Man featuring Manoj Bajpayee.

He made his acting debut with The Family Man in 2019 and also acted in Mirzapur 2 and Breathe 2. Vijay played the character of Commodore Chintamani Sharma in the Special Ops 1.5 on Hotstar.

He has acted in several plays, including the role of Chanakya in an English play titled "ALEXANDER VS CHANAKYA", and Hindi adaptations of Arthur Miller's play "All my Sons" called DORAHA.

Singh has trained Sanjana Sanghi and Sharvari Wagh in voice and diction.

== Filmography ==
Year	Title	Role	Notes
2006–present	Bigg Boss	Narrator	Television series; Voice-over
2019	The Family Man Season 1	Ajit	
2020	Breathe: Into the Shadows	Dr. Jehangir	
2020	Mirzapur	Mr. Kamani	
2021	The Family Man Season 2	Ajit	
2021	Special Ops 1.5: The Himmat Story	Naval Commodore Chintamani Sharma	
2022	777 Charlie	Military Officer	Kannada film
2023	Farzi	Ajit	
2023	The Trial	Takesh	
2024	Yodha	Senior Officer Delhi Control Room	
2024	Undekhi	Adv. Sunderlal Bajaj	
2025	Chhaava	Peshwa Neelopant	
2025	Crime Beat	Police Commissioner	
2025	Sena: Guardians of the Nation	Brigaider V. K. Singh	
2025	War 2	Military Officer	
2025	Haq	High Court Judge	
2025	Homebound	Shoaib's boss	
2026	Taskaree	CBIC Chairman	Netflix series
2026	Ikka	Judge Kamra	Netflix film
