= Parmeet Sethi =

Indian actor and filmmaker

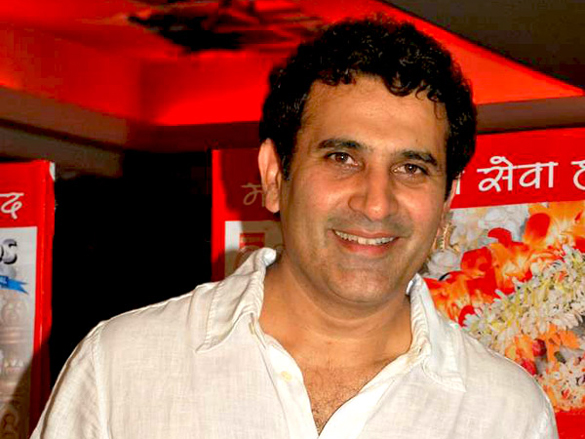
- Sethi in 2009
- Born: 11 December
- Occupation: Actor
- Years active: 1995–present
- Spouse: Archana Puran Singh (m. 1992)
- Children: 2
- Relatives: Niki Aneja Walia (cousin)

Parmeet Sethi is an Indian actor. He is best known for portraying Kuljeet Singh in his debut in Aditya Chopra's directorial debut Dilwale Dulhania Le Jayenge (1995).

Sethi has also acted in films such as Dhadkan (2000), Om Jai Jagadish (2002), Lakshya (2004), Baabul (2006), Dil Dhadakne Do (2015), Rustom (2016), Laila Majnu (2018) and Bhangra Paa Le (2020). Apart from films, he is also active in television shows and has appeared in Dastaan (1995–1996) and Jassi Jaissi Koi Nahin (2003–2006), Detective Omkar Nath (2006), Sujata (2008), Pehredaar Piya Ki (2017), My Name Ijj Lakhan (2019), Special OPS (2020) and Hundred (2020).

He made his directorial debut with Badmaash Company (2010) which earned him a nomination for the Best Debutante Director at Zee Cine Awards.

== Personal life ==
Sethi married actress Archana Puran Singh on 30 June 1992. They have two sons. He is the cousin of television actress Niki Aneja Walia.

== Career ==
Sethi made his Bollywood debut in the award-winning film Dilwale Dulhania Le Jayenge (1995), portraying the role of Kuljeet Singh. The movie went onto became a commercially and critically acclaimed film. Subsequently, he starred in Diljale (1996) as Captain Ranveer with Ajay Devgn and Sonali Bendre. He also starred in the critically acclaimed Punjabi language film Des Hoyaa Pardes (2004). The film won a National Award for Best Feature Film in Punjabi.

In 2005, he participated in the first season of Indian television dance reality show Nach Baliye with his wife Archana Puran Singh. Then in 2006, he hosted another television dance reality show Jhalak Dikhhla Jaa with his wife.

In 2010, he tried his first directorial venture, Yash Raj's Badmaash Company starring Shahid Kapoor, Anushka Sharma and Meiyang Chang, which was a success at box office earning 530 million Indian rupees. Sethi wrote its entire script with dialogues in just six days. The film received mixed-to-positive reviews from critics. Taran Adarsh of Bollywood Hungama gave it a rating of 3 out of 5, saying; "On the whole, Badmaash Company is a watchable experience for various reasons, the prime reason being it offers solid entertainment, but doesn't insult your intelligence." Rajeev Masand of CNN-IBN gave the movie 1.5 out of 5 and claimed it to be "outrageously silly". Gaurav Malani of Indiatimes gave the film 3.5 out of 5 saying "Badmaash Company is a good entertainer. Worth a watch!" and praising Shahid Kapoor. Komal Nahta gave the film 2.5 out of 5, praising the performance of Kapoor and called Badmaash Company "an entertainer". Sukanya Verma of rediff gave the film 2 out of 5 stars saying Sethi's directorial debut starts out with cocksure confidence and zing. Nikhat Kazmi of the Times of India gave the film 3 out of 5 stars and said, "Indeed, Badmaash Company does have a bunch of riveting scenes, although the story does follow a very predictable line of crime and punishment/repentance." DNA gave the film 2.5 out of 5 saying, "This company is worth keeping." Anupama Chopra of NDTV called it a "staggeringly tedious film" while Raja Sen of Rediff said, "There's not a single scene in the film that actually works". Mayank Shekhar of the Hindustan Times criticised the film as half-written; he only liked the film until the interval and gave it 2 out of 5.

In 2008, after his appearance in the film named Dus Kahaniyaan (2007), he took a break from acting to focus on writing and direction. In 2015, he made his comeback after seven years as an actor in the Zoya Akhtar-directorial Dil Dhadakne Do (2015).

He has also directed some episodes of sitcom Sumit Sambhal Lega (2015). In 2017, he again directed another television sitcom Har Mard Ka Dard. It starred Faisal Rashid in the lead. In 2020, Sethi appeared in Neeraj Pandey-directed Hotstar Original web series Special OPS. In 2021, he made his Punjabi television debut with a show named Akhiyaan Udeek Diyan, which was aired on Zee Punjabi.

== Filmography ==
=== Films ===
†	Denotes films that have not yet been released

Year	Title	Role	Note
1995	Dilwale Dulhania Le Jayenge	Kuljeet Singh	Debut film
1996	Diljale	Captain Ranveer	
1998	Hero Hindustani	Rohit	
1999	Kachche Dhaage	Singer	Special appearance
1999	Hum Aapke Dil Mein Rehte Hain	Yeshwant Kumar	
1999	Laawaris	Raj Kalra	
2000	Dhadkan	Bob	
2000	Khauff	Samrat	
2000	Mela	Surendra Pratap Singh	Special appearance
2001	Kuch Khatti Kuch Meethi	Ranjeet Uncle	
2002	Om Jai Jagadish	Shekhar Malhotra	
2003	Jhankaar Beats	Nicki's lawyer	
2004	Turn Left at the End of the World	Roger Talkar	Israeli film
2004	Des Hoyaa Pardes	Darshan Singh	Punjabi film
2004	Lakshya	Major Shahbaaz Humdani	
2005	Fareb	Siddharth Sardesai	
2005	Kaal	Forest Officer Khan	
2006	Humko Tumse Pyaar Hai	Rana	
2006	Baabul	Khushi	
2007	Dus Kahaniyaan	Lover	
2008	Thodi Life Thoda Magic	Aditya Singhania	
2009	Vighnaharta Shree Siddhivinayak	Manav Mehta	
2009	Bad Luck Govind	Kapoor	
2010	Badmaash Company	—N/a	Director and screenwriter only
2015	Wedding Pullav	Kumar	
2015	Dil Dhadakne Do	Lalit Sood	
2016	Rustom	Rear Admiral Prashant Kamath	
2017	Call For Fun	Dev Mehra	
2018	Laila Majnu	Masood	
2019	Phir Ussi Mod Par	Shahid Khan	
2020	Bhangra Paa Le	Jaggi's father	
2021	Tuesdays & Fridays	Dr. Vikrant Malhotra	
2022	Sharmaji Namkeen	Robbie	
2023	Mission Majnu	R. N. Kao	
2023	Tumse Na Ho Payega	Investor	
2025	Aabeer Gulaal	Suresh	

=== Television ===
Year	Title	Role	Notes
1994–1996	Kurukshetra		
1995–1996	Dastaan	Karan Kapoor	
1995–1996	Tujhpe Dil Qurbaan	Major Vikram Ali	Lead role
2001	Samandar	Rakesh	
2001	Aasman Say Tapki	—N/a	Writer
2002–2003	Zindagi Teri Meri Kahani	Rahul	
2002	Ssshhhh...Koi Hai	Ghost	Episode: Shart
2003	Samne Wali Khidki	—N/a	Writer and producer
2003–2006	Jassi Jaissi Koi Nahin	Raj Malhotra	
2004	Ruby Duby Hub Dub	Deepak Malhotra	
2004	Saara Akaash	Squadron Leader Srinivas Rao	
2005	Nach Baliye	Himself	Contestant
2006	Sarabhai vs Sarabhai	Detective Omkar Nath (D.O.N)	Special appearance
2006	Detective Omkar Nath (D.O.N)	Detective Omkar Nath (D.O.N)	
2006	Jhalak Dikhhla Jaa	Host/presenter	
2007–2009	Maayka	Prem	
2008	Sujata		
2015–2016	Sumit Sambhal Lega	—N/a	Director
2017	Har Mard Ka Dard	—N/a	Director
2017	Pehredaar Piya Ki	Maan Singh	
2019	My Name Ijj Lakhan	Dasharath	
2020–2025	Special Ops	Naresh Chaddha	
2020	Hundred	Anshuman Goswami	
2021	Akhiyan Udeek Diyan		Punjabi language serial
2021	Special Ops 1.5: The Himmat Story	Naresh Chaddha	
2023	Hack Crimes Online	—N/a	Director
2024	The Magic Of Shiri	Randeep	
2024	Citadel: Honey Bunny	Dilip D'Souza	Guest
2026	Dhammal with Pati Patni Aur Panga – Jodiyon Ka Reality Check	Contestant	
