= Soft and Hard =

- Directed by: Jean-Luc Godard; Anne-Marie Miéville
- Written by: Jean-Luc Godard; Anne-Marie Miéville
- Produced by: Tony Kirkhope
- Starring: Jean-Luc Godard; Anne-Marie Miéville
- Cinematography: Pierre Binggeli
- Edited by: Jean-Luc Godard; Anne-Marie Miéville
- Distributed by: channel 4
- Release date: 1985
- Running time: 52 min.
- Countries: France; United Kingdom
- Language: French

Soft and Hard is a video piece created by Jean-Luc Godard and Anne-Marie Miéville in 1985. It runs for 52 minutes and features their conversations about filmmaking and television.
