= Love Ne Mila Di Jodi =

- Genre: Romance drama
- Created by: Shakuntalam Telefilms
- Written by: Jay Verma
- Starring: See below
- Country of origin: India
- Original language: Hindi
- No. of seasons: 1
- No. of episodes: 180

Original release
- Network: STAR One
- Release: 22 June 2009 – 26 February 2010

Love Ne Mila Di Jodi (transl. A Match Made by Love) is an Indian soap opera that aired on STAR One from 22 June 2009 to 26 February 2010.

== Plot ==
Balraj Saxena is the Head of Security for a businesswoman Ila Gujral (Sujata Sehgal) in Mumbai, India. Balraj has a wife and three sons - Prithvi (Gaurav Khanna), Sameer (Karan Tacker) and Varun (Dishank Arora) who live in Manali. Balraj is about to retire and head back to Manali to spend all his free time with his family. On the last days of his service, Ila throws an engagement party for her eldest daughter, Damini (Chandana Sharma) with Inder (Sandeep Rajora). Ila has two other daughters–Avni (Perneet Chauhan) and Roshni (Simran Kaur). At Damini's engagement party, a drunk journalist, Chaitanya, threatens Ila vowing to reveal her deepest secret. Balraj takes Chaitanya into custody and away from the party. After some time, a gunshot is heard and Chaitanya is found dead. Balraj is arrested as he was the one who dragged Chaitanya away from the party and threatened him.

The news of Balraj's arrest reaches his three sons. Prithvi and Sameer head for Mumbai from Manali and Varun stays back with their mother. Prithvi and Sameer reach Mumbai and visit their father who says that he was framed for the murder. After a few days, their father dies in the prison. The police label it as suicide but Prithvi and Sameer know that it was murder. Their mother doesn't take the news well and goes into a coma. In the span of few days, the entire Saxena household is destroyed. The three brothers vow to take revenge from Ila Gujral by destroying her and her daughters.

Prithvi enters the Gujral mansion as Damini's bodyguard. They don't see eye to eye with each other and often argue. They both find each other arrogant and obnoxious. But their feelings for each other start changing when Prithvi reveals to Damini that Inder, her fiancé is cheating on her. Slowly they start respecting one another and fall in love. Prithvi at first acts that he is in love but gradually falls for Damini, despite being conflicted about it. Ila Gujral gets them married and Prithvi agrees as he would be in the family and could cause more damage.

Sameer enters Avni's life in the guise of her childhood friend, Jay Chawla. They both secretly get married and Avni gets pregnant as well. On Damini and Prithvi's wedding day, the truth of Avni's pregnancy is revealed. Sameer (pretending to be Jay) refuses to accept the child as his in front of the entire family. Heartbroken, Avni tries to commit suicide but is saved by Prithvi at the last moment. Prithvi realizes that Sameer has crossed a line in his revenge and makes Sameer apologize and legally marry Avni. Avni who was once soft-spoken and meek has hardened after the incident and resolves to get even with Sameer.

Varun enters the Gujral company and starts financially destroying it. Roshni, unaware of Varun's motives, starts falling in love with him. Varun also reciprocates her feelings but never shows it to her as his main aim is to destroy Ila Gujral. Ila, after Prithvi and Damini's wedding, makes Prithvi the MD of the company and gives him controlling power. Later the brothers find out that Ila Gujral was actually trying to help their father. She had nothing to do with their father's arrest or murder. The brothers feel very guilty of how they tried to ruin the lives of Ila, Damini, Avni and Roshni. They tend to make amends but it is too late as Inder, Damini's ex-fiancé, finds out the truth about the Saxena brothers and reveals it to the Gujrals. Ila's health is further deteriorated. Damini and Avni break all ties with Prithvi and Sameer but on Ila's insistence, as she is on her death bed, Damini agrees to try and work it out with Prithvi. Ila dies leaving the three grief-stricken sisters. Chaitanya's killer is revealed to be Inder who is then put behind bars.

The sisters are slowly recovering from the grief with the help of the Saxena brothers when tragedy enters in the form of Mausi (Niyati Joshi) (who tries to break the relationships between the Gujral girls and Saxena boys), Munna (who sets his eyes on Roshni and takes an MMSMultimedia Messaging Service of her while she was bathing) and Rani (who is in love with Sameer and tries to hurt Avni and her unborn baby). The trio of Munna-Mausi-Rani is successful in driving a wedge between Prithvi and Damini and throws Damini, who is the strongest of the three sisters, out of the house. Damini was accused of leading to the death of Prithvi's comatose mother due to her negligence.

Damini then teams up with Roshni first and later Avni to reveal the true identity of Mausi-Munna-Rani. The sisters are able to prove that Prithvi's mother was killed by Munna, not due to Damini's negligence. They are also able to prove that Mausi and Rani were mixing slow poison in Avni's juice to kill her unborn child. The mms of Roshni in Munna's phone is also cleverly destroyed by Damini with Varun's help. Once the truth is out, Prithvi sends Munna-Mausi and Rani to jail.

In the final episode, the show takes a leap of four months. Prithvi and Damini have started their security agency, Sameer and Avni deliver a baby boy and Varun and Roshni get married. Another leap of two years is shown where Prithvi and Damini have a baby girl and all the three couples and their children live happily ever after.

== Cast ==
- Chandana Sharma as Damini gujral; wife of Prithvi; eldest of the Gujral sisters; a strong and level-headed businesswoman who is very protective of her family (2009-2010)
- Gaurav Khanna as Prithvi Saxena; husband of Damini; eldest of Saxena brothers; always looks out for his family and respects Damini and treats her as his equal (2009-2010)
- Perneet Chauhan as Avni gujral; wife of Sameer; 2nd daughter of Ila Gujral; meek and shy by nature, she is easily manipulated by Sameer at first but later on she becomes stronger than she was (2009-2010)
- Karan Tacker as fake Jai Chawla/Sameer Saxena; husband of Avni; 2nd son of Balraj Saxena; outgoing and fun-loving by nature, manipulated Avni into marrying him but later on fell in love with her (2009-2010)
- Simran Kaur as Roshni Gujral; wife of Varun; youngest Gujral sister; extrovert and childish, the most pampered Gujral sister (2009-2010)
- Dishank Arora as Varun Saxena; husband of Roshni; youngest of the Saxena brothers; studious and serious. (2009-2010)
- Sujata Sehgal / Tiya Gandwani as Ila Gujral; matriarch of the Gujral family; a strong business woman; loves her daughters more than anything in the world (2009) / (2009)
- Sandeep Rajora as Inder Main antagonist and Damini's ex-fiancé; he was responsible for Chaitanya's death for which Balraj was framed (2009)
- Niyati Joshi as Mausi; antagonist; the maternal aunt of Saxena brothers who hates the Gujral sisters. (2010)
- Gungun Uprari as Mrs. Saxena; Prithvi, Sameer and Varun's mother (2009-2010)
- Poonam Joshi as Rani, Mausi's daughter (2010)
- Eijaz Khan as Munna, Rani's boyfriend (2010)
- Adi Irani as Balraj Saxena; Prithvi, Sameer and Varun's father (2009)
- Prithvi Zutshi as Chaitanya Sharma, Damini's biological father (2009)

=== Guests ===
- Sidharth Shukla as Veer
