= Number Two (film) =

- Directed by: Jean-Luc Godard
- Written by: Jean-Luc Godard; Anne-Marie Miéville
- Produced by: Georges de Beauregard
- Starring: Sandrine Battistella; Pierre Oudrey; Alexandre Rignault; Rachel Stefanopoli; Jean-Luc Godard
- Music by: Léo Ferré
- Release date: 24 September 1975 (France)
- Running time: 88 min
- Language: French

Number Two (French: Numéro deux), by Jean-Luc Godard and Anne-Marie Miéville, is a 1975 experimental film about a young family in a social housing complex in France. The film's distinct style involves presenting two images on screen simultaneously, leading to multiple interpretations of the story and to comments on the film-making and editing process.

== Description ==
The film is divided into two parts. For the first third of the movie, Godard discusses what it takes to make a film (money) and describes how he got the money. Numéro deux begins with a long monologue by Jean-Luc Godard, in an editing suite. Godard discusses his move to a smaller place from Paris, the finances required to make a film and alludes to the relationship between machines and people, bodies as factories and landscapes and the idea that a film studio is a factory in which he is both worker and the boss. He says that creating his movies has become like working in a factory for him: "Now there are only machines. I am the boss, but I am also the worker. There are other factories: in Los Angeles, called Fox and Metro, in Moscow, in Algeria." During this opening sequence of the film, viewers are presented with television monitors featuring characters who will return in the main section of the film.

In the second part, the remaining two thirds, each character in the story discusses their quotidian experiences through dialogue. The film observes the sexual and economic life of a middle-class family in a social housing complex in France. The wife complains of her constipation (her inability to make a 'number two,' alluded to in the title) to her children. When the husband discovers that she has slept with another man, he takes his revenge her by sodomizing her, which only makes her constipation worse. During this sex, they realize that their daughter has been watching them. They discuss this complacently. They discuss how a woman's body is described as electricity, charging up and discharging, and sex is work when it becomes something for a child to watch.

Godard, and, later in the story, Sandrine and Pierre, describe these things as not being contradictory, but flowing from one to another through the word “and”. In one sequence, mother and daughter cavort around in the living room at lunch time - the mother wearing nothing but an untied robe and the daughter in underwear - while the son toys with his meal in the kitchen and holds his head in boredom. Sandrine says: Le plaisir, c’est pas simple. C’est l’angoisse qui est simple, pas le plaisir. C’est le chômage qui est simple, pas le plaisir. Quand il y a du plaisir à être chômeur, alors c’est le fascisme qui s’installe. The children participate in discussions about sex and body parts, and comment on it. Vanessa states: “Sometimes what my parents do is pretty; sometimes it's caca.”

Sandrine and Pierre's family is “observed” by static cameras that were installed in rooms of an apartment and that were later played back and recorded on 35 mm film. The opening sequence of the film is at full-screen resolution (having been filmed on 35 mm camera directly) but the scenes in the apartment often take up only a small portion of the screen, and play off each other. The sound design emphasises the outside noises (birds singing, children playing) over the people's dialogue, giving the effect of the outside world coming in and affecting what occurs in the home.

== Sources ==
- Morrey, Douglas. Jean-Luc Godard.2005 Manchester. Manchester University Press 304 pages ISBN 0-7190-6758-8
- Silverman, Kaja, Harun Farocki. Speaking About Godard. 1998. New York: NYU Press 243 pages ISBN 0-8147-8066-0
