= Hélène Roussel =

French actress (1932–2022)

- Born: Yvonne Louise Gabrielle Roussel; 2 September 1931; Courbevoie, France
- Died: 5 December 2022 (aged 90)
- Occupation: Actress

Hélène Roussel, stage name of Yvonne Louise Gabrielle Roussel, (2 September 1932 – 5 December 2022) was a French actress. She was the sister of actress Michèle Morgan and the wife of actor André Cellier.

Roussel died on 5 December 2022, at the age of 90.

== Filmography ==
- Service Entrance (1954)
- Razzia sur la chnouf (1955)
- Paris, Palace Hotel (1956)
- The Man in the Raincoat (1957)
- Retour de manivelle (1957)
- Boys and Girls (1967)
- Death in a French Garden (1985)
- My Dear Subject (1988)
- Divine Enfant (1989)
- Un amour de trop (1990)
- The Life of the Dead (1991)
- Le Regard de l'autre (1993)
- Les Derniers Jours d'Emmanuel Kant (1993)
- Lou n'a pas dit non (1994)
- Intimacy (1994)
- The Apprentices (1995)
- The Eighth Day (1996)
- The Dilettante (1999)
- La confiance règne (2004)
- A Christmas Tale (2008)
