= Anne-Marie Miéville =

French filmmaker (born 1945)

- Born: 11 November 1945 (age 80); Lausanne, Switzerland
- Occupation: Filmmaker
- Partner(s): Jean-Luc Godard (1978–2022; his death)

Anne-Marie Miéville (French pronunciation: [an maʁi mjevil]; born 11 November 1945) is a Swiss video and filmmaker whom Sight & Sound has called a "hugely important multimedia artist."

== Biography ==
Miéville was a practising photographer when she met Jean-Luc Godard, who would become her companion (and later husband), in Paris in 1970. From 1973 until 1994, she collaborated with Godard as photographer, scriptwriter, film editor, co-director, assuming the role of artistic director on some of their projects. In 1983, she directed her first short film How can I love; her second, The Book of Mary (Le livre de Marie), followed one year later. The Book of Mary is featured in the DVD release of Godard's Hail Mary (1985).

== Works ==
In 2002, Miéville wrote Images en parole, a set of short texts published by Léo Scheer, who wrote that they are "a continuation of static shots, short films of the writing. It is not strictly speaking about novels, but rather of unspeakable moments, escaped flavours of images, where it would be a question of filming with words".

=== As a director ===
- 1976 : Six fois deux/Sur et sous la communication (TV series)
- 1976 : Here and Elsewhere (French: Ici et Ailleurs)
- 1977 : France/tour/detour/deux/enfants (TV series)
- 1978 : Comment ça va?
- 1983 : How Can I Love
- 1984 : Le Livre de Marie
- 1986 : Soft and Hard
- 1986 : Faire la fête
- 1988: My Dear Subject (French: Mon cher sujet)
- 1989 : Le Rapport Darty
- 1990 : Comment vont les enfants
- 1991 : Contre l'oubli (documentary constituted by thirty short films of three minutes for thirty cases of Amnesty International).
- 1994 : Lou n'a pas dit non (inspired by correspondence between Lou Andreas Salomé and Rainer Maria Rilke)
- 1995 : Deux fois cinquante ans de cinéma français
- 1997 : Nous sommes tous encore ici
- 1998 : The Old Place
- 2000 : Après la réconciliation
- 2002 : Liberté et patrie

=== As a screenwriter ===
- 1975 : Numéro deux
- 1976 : Six fois deux/Sur et sous la communication (TV series)
- 1976 : Here and Elsewhere (French: Ici et Ailleurs)
- 1977 : France/tour/detour/deux/enfants (TV series)
- 1978 : Comment ça va?
- 1980: Every Man for Himself (French: Sauve qui peut (la vie))
- 1985 : Détective
- 1986 : Faire la fête
- 1988: My Dear Subject (French: Mon cher sujet)
- 1994 : Lou n'a pas dit non
- 1997 : Nous sommes tous encore ici
- 2000 : Après la réconciliation
- 2002 : Liberté et patrie
- 2002 : Ten Minutes Older: The Cello

=== As editor ===
- 1976 : Six fois deux/Sur et sous la communication (TV series)
- 1976 : Here and Elsewhere (French: Ici et Ailleurs)
- 1980: Every Man for Himself (French: Sauve qui peut (la vie))
- 1985: Hail Mary (French: Je vous salue, Marie)
- 1986 : Faire la fête
- 1988: My Dear Subject (French: Mon cher sujet)
- 1995 : Deux fois cinquante ans de cinéma français
- 2000 : Après la réconciliation
- 2002 : Liberté et patrie
