= Chalo Dilli =

2011 film directed by Shashant Shah

- Theatrical release poster
- Directed by: Shashant Shah
- Screenplay by: Arshad Sayed
- Story by: Arshad Sayed
- Produced by: Krishika Lulla; Kavita Bhupathi Chadda; Lara Dutta
- Starring: Lara Dutta; Vinay Pathak; Akshay Kumar; Mahika Sharma
- Cinematography: Nikos Andritsakis
- Edited by: Aseem Sinha
- Music by: Gourov Dasgupta; Anand Raj Anand; Sachin Gupta (Hi5); Rohit Kulkarni; Roshan Balu
- Distributed by: Big Daddy Productions; Eros International Media Ltd. Bheegi Basanti Entertainment
- Release date: 29 April 2011
- Running time: 155 minutes
- Country: India
- Language: Hindi

Chalo Dilli (transl. Let's go to Delhi) is a 2011 Indian film directed by Shashant Shah. It features Lara Dutta and Vinay Pathak. It also features Akshay Kumar and Mahika Sharma in a guest appearance. The film, produced under Dutta's husband Mahesh Bhupathi's production company, Big Daddy Productions and Eros International Media Ltd, was shot at locations in Mumbai, Delhi and Jaipur. It was released on 29 April 2011. It was inspired by the film Planes, Trains and Automobiles starring Steve Martin. A sequel to the film, named Chalo China, was set to be made in 2014 but was postponed due to a lack of financiers.

== Plot ==
Mihika Banerjee (Lara Dutta), a successful investment banker living in Mumbai, misses her flight to Delhi and needs to get there anyway possible to meet her husband, Lt. Col. Vikram Rana (Akshay Kumar). She meets Manu Gupta (Vinay Pathak), and they discover the colours of India on their journey to Delhi. They go by road and train, and the audience gets a chance to see both the large urban conglomerations and the small rural areas like Nua, a small town in Rajasthan, that make up India. During the journey, Mihika experiences various difficulties that she has never encountered in her high-class life. When Mihika's money is stolen while she is buying a train ticket, she is forced to travel with Manu in the ordinary class in Jhunjhunu District. Thus the film revolves around Mihika's and Manu's journey amidst difficulties.

== Cast ==
- Lara Dutta as Mihika Banerjee / Mihika Vikram Singh Rana
- Vinay Pathak as Manu Gupta
- Akshay Kumar as Lt. Col. Vikram Singh Rana, Mihika's husband (Cameo appearance)
- Narottam Bain as Taxi Driver Shivrattan Bansod
- Pankaj Jha as Inspector Surendra Mishra
- Brijendra Kala as K. C. Pant (train ticket examiner)
- Rahul Singh (actor) as Bhairon Singh Gurjar
- Mahika Sharma as Aalisha
- Raghav Tiwari as Naresh
- Lokesh Verma as Billu
- Ajit Mathur as Pappu
- Gaurav Gera as Gopi
- Mukesh Bhatt (actor) as Pandeyji
- Teddy Maurya as Bhaiyaji/Shrivastava Ji
- Manoj Bakshi as Jhujjhar Singh
- Narottam Bain as Shivratan/Bablu (taxi driver)
- Dadhi R Pandey as Dharampalji (lorry driver)
- Yana Gupta as Laila (guest appearance in the song "Laila O Laila")

== Critical reception ==
The Times of India gave the film 3.5 out of 5, writing that "the film has so much soul especially in the climax, it makes up for any shortcomings in story and vision." Taran Adarsh of Bollywood Hungama gave the film three out of five, writing, "On the whole, CHALO DILLI is exciting and amusing in parts. The film has some terrific moments, but the writing could've been more persuasive towards the post-interval portions. Yet, all said and done, there's something nice about it, despite the blemishes. Decent watch!"

Conversely, Shubhra Gupta of The Indian Express gave the film 2 1/2 out of 5, writing, "A sentimental climactic twist ends up being surprisingly not schmaltzy, and gives an interesting touch to ‘Chalo Dilli'. It could have been, though, shorter and crisper." Preeti Arora of rediff.com gave the film 1.5 out of 5 calling it "an arduous journey to nowhere." She further wrote, "Cliches are rampant and in-your-face. As Lara Dutta keeps losing her luggage, her gadgets (basically everything she believed was essential to her life so far) she turns into a happier person. Who doesn't mind traipsing through the small towns in a torn satin blouse and muck on her face? This film could maybe work as a visual interpretation of The Road Less Travelled."

== Soundtrack ==
Chalo Dilli

Soundtrack album by Gourov Dasgupta, Anand Raj Anand, and Sachin Gupta
- Released: 29 April 2011
- Genre: Film soundtrack
- Label: T-Series

The music was composed by Gourov Dasgupta, Anand Raj Anand, Sachin Gupta, Rohit Kulkarni, and Roshan Balu. Lyrics were penned by Manthan, Anand Raj Anand, Krishika Lulla, Shabbir Ahmed, and Nisha Mascarenhas. A remix version of the track "Laila O Laila" from the 1980 film Qurbani, is used in the film and features Yana Gupta.

=== Track listing ===
No.	Title	Music	Singer(s)	Length
1.	"Chalo Dilli"	Gourov Dasgupta	Raja Hasan	4:34
2.	"Hi 5"	Sachin Gupta	Neeraj Shridhar	5:49
3.	"Kaun Se Badi Baat"	Rohit Kulkarni	Kamal Heer	5:12
4.	"Laila O Laila"	Kalyanji-Anandji, Gourov Dasgupta	June Banerjee	3:11
5.	"Matargashtiya"	Anand Raj Anand	Sukhwinder Singh	4:47
6.	"Moments in Life"	Rohit Kulkarni	Natalie Di Luccio	3:24
7.	"Hi 5" (Club Mix)	Sachin Gupta	Neeraj Shridhar	2:33
8.	"Laila" (Club Mix)	Roshan Balu	June Banerjee	4:35
