= Arshad Syed =

Indian television and film writer

Arshad Sayed is an Indian television and film writer. His first movie as director will be Satra Ko Shaadi Hai.

== Filmography ==
=== Movies ===
Year	Movie	Role
2025	Deva	Writer
2021	Woh Ladki Hai Kahaan	Director/writer
2020	Satra Ko Shaadi Hai	Director
2019	Student of the Year 2	Writer
2014	Shaadi Ke Side Effects	Dialogues/Screenplay
2013	Gori Tere Pyaar Mein	Story
2011	Chalo Dilli	Story/Screenplay
2010	Hum Tum Aur Ghost	Dialogues/Screenplay
2008	Dasvidaniya	Writer
2007	MP3: Mera Pehla Pehla Pyaar	
2007	Go (2007 film)	Writer

=== Television ===
Year	Show	Role
2025	Bhay: The Gaurav Tiwari Mystery	writer
2010-2013	Adaalat	Story/Dialogues/Screenplay
2001-2004	Ssshhhh...Koi Hai	Story/Dialogues/Screenplay
2004	The Great Indian Comedy Show	Writer
