= Here and Elsewhere =

- Directed by: Jean-Luc Godard; Jean-Pierre Gorin; Anne-Marie Miéville
- Written by: Jean-Luc Godard; Jean-Pierre Gorin; Anne-Marie Miéville
- Produced by: Jean-Luc Godard; Anne-Marie Miéville; Jean-Pierre Rassam
- Narrated by: Jean-Luc Godard
- Cinematography: William Lubtchansky
- Edited by: Anne-Marie Miéville
- Music by: Jean Schwarz
- Distributed by: MK2
- Release date: 1976
- Running time: 53 min
- Country: France
- Language: French

Here and Elsewhere (French: Ici et Ailleurs) is a 1976 documentary film by Jean-Luc Godard and Anne-Marie Miéville. It is a film essay, narrated by Godard and Miéville, which began as a film entitled Jusqu'à la victoire (Until Victory), undertaken by the Dziga Vertov Group, the partnership of Godard and Jean-Pierre Gorin who together made a number of political films between 1968 and 1972.

Here and Elsewhere incorporates footage of Palestinian fedayeen in Jordan, Lebanon, and the West Bank taken for Jusqu'à la victoire, which had been commissioned by the Arab League. The footage had been shelved in 1970 after many of the subjects were killed in the events of Black September. In Here and Elsewhere, Godard and Miéville analyze and critique this footage, including their attempt to use Palestinians as stand-ins for Godard and Gorin's own views.

The film also features footage of a French family watching television (here) in juxtaposition to the footage from the Middle East (elsewhere). This footage was shot in 1974 in Grenoble where Godard and Miéville had recently moved.

Primarily the film is a criticism of how capitalism's use of media distorts the aims of liberative and revolutionary causes, among other aspects of economic and social disparities. This critique is applied to the filmmakers themselves, the Palestinian fighters, and the European Left more broadly.

Ici et Ailleurs marks the beginning of Godard's transitional period, which found him experimenting in very original ways with video, and political and representational polemics; as such, it shares many of the traits of both his radical-era films and the video-centered work that followed. It is also one of his first projects with Miéville, who remained the major collaborator in his life and work since that period.

== Release ==
The film was released on DVD by Olive Films in 2012.
