= Tanvi the Great =

Indian Hindi-language drama film

- Theatrical release poster
- Directed by: Anupam Kher
- Written by: Anupam Kher; Ankur Suman; Abhishek Dixit
- Story by: Anupam Kher; Abhishek Dixit
- Produced by: Anupam Kher
- Starring: Anupam Kher; Shubhangi Dutt; Aravind Swamy; Iain Glen; Boman Irani; Jackie Shroff; Pallavi Joshi
- Cinematography: Keiko Nakahara
- Edited by: Tushar Parekh
- Music by: M. M. Keeravani
- Production companies: Anupam Kher Studio; NFDC
- Distributed by: Excel Entertainment; AA Films
- Release date: 18 July 2025
- Running time: 160 minutes
- Country: India
- Language: Hindi

Tanvi The Great is a 2025 Hindi-language drama film directed by Anupam Kher. Produced by Anupam Kher Studio and NFDC. The film stars Anupam Kher and Iain Glen. It was theatrically released on 18 July 2025.

== Plot ==
Tanvi Raina, a 21-year-old woman on the autism spectrum, lives with her mother Vidya and grandfather Colonel Pratap Raina. Inspired by her deceased father, Captain Samar Raina, an Indian Army officer who dreamed of saluting the flag at Siachen Glacier, Tanvi becomes determined to follow in his footsteps and join the army to fulfill his dream herself.

== Cast ==
- Anupam Kher as Colonel Pratap Raina
- Shubhangi Dutt as Tanvi Raina
- Arvind Swami as Major Srinivasan
- Iain Glen as Michael Simmons
- Boman Irani as Raza Sahab
- Jackie Shroff as Brigadier Joshi
- Pallavi Joshi as Vidya Raina
- Karan Tacker as Captain Samar Raina
- Nassar as Brigadier KN Rao
- Joanna Ashka as Joanna Ciosek
- Javed Ali as Himself

== Production ==
Anupam Kher announced the film through a social media post on the occasion of his 69th birthday on 7 March 2024. It was also announced that the shooting of the film would start on the day of Maha Shivratri, or 8 March.

== Music ==
Tanvi the Great

Soundtrack album by M. M. Keeravani
- Released: 5 July 2025
- Recorded: 2024–25
- Genre: Feature film soundtrack
- Length: 47:50
- Language: Hindi
- Label: Zee Music Company

M. M. Keeravani chronology
Auron Mein Kahan Dum Tha (2024)	Tanvi the Great (2025)

Official audio
- Tanvi the Great Full Album on YouTube

The soundtrack is composed by M. M. Keeravani and lyrics are written by Kausar Munir, Shannon K and Dirty Grim.

Track listing
No.	Title	Singer(s)	Length
1.	"Goodbye Song"	Shagun Sodhi	4:14
2.	"Mann Chala Manwa"	M. M. Keeravani, Gomathi Iyer, Baby Sanvi	3:28
3.	"Soche Aasma"	Raj Pandit	3:24
4.	"Oh Mere Mann Mohana"	Ramya Behara, Nayana Nair	5:49
5.	"Zindagi"	Vishal Mishra	6:35
6.	"Sena Ki Jai"	Shagun Sodhi	4:51
7.	"Tanvi Ki Jai"	Shaan, Shagun Sodhi & Gomathi Iyer	5:31
8.	"Tere Suro Mein Gaane Lagaa"	M.M. Keeravaani, Gomathi Iyer	1:51
9.	"Different, But No Less" (Lyrics by Shannon K, Dirty Grim)	Shannon K & Dirty Grim	2:33
10.	"Sena Ki Jai" (Male Version)	Sonu Nigam	4:50
11.	"Theme Music Of Tanvi The Great"	Gomathi Iyer	2:44
Total length:			47:50

== Reception ==
Shubhra Gupta of The Indian Express gave 2.5 stars out of 5 and said that "It’s the kind of film that leaves you conflicted. You can be gobsmacked at the enormity of Tanvi’s achievements. And yet you end up rooting for her and those like her: if she can do it, maybe someone else can too." Anurag Singh Bohra of India Today rated 2/5 stars and said that "Despite its ambitious emotional arc, the Anupam Kher-directorial drifts from its promising premise. Stories based on sensitive subjects demand care, authenticity, and restraint. This film, sadly, delivers none of these." Saibal Chatterjee of NDTV gave 2 stars out of 5 and writes in his review that "Shubhangi's central performance, the film's fulcrum, is enterprising no doubt, but is somewhat inconsistent."

Anuj Kumar of The Hindu observed that "Formulated to raise awareness about autism and respect for the armed forces, the message-heavy film is different but doesn’t reach the heights it promises." Rishabh Suri of Hindustan Times rated 3/5 stars and said that "Film showcases heartfelt performances and a strong emotional core, yet falters in its second half." Abhishek Srivastava of The Times of India gave 4 stars out of 5 and said that "Watch ‘Tanvi: The Great’ for its emotionally honest storytelling that avoids melodrama and lets simple, real moments speak volumes."

Tanmayi Savadi of Times Now rated 2.5/5 stars and commented that "Tanvi The Great lacks freshness, energy and effortless pull into the story; also, a solid packaging of an important message. Its single-toned approach keeps the recall value low. Watch it only for the honest performances." Rahul Desai of The Hollywood Reporter India commented that "Tanvi the Great somehow reduces its central theme — a hero and her ‘superpower’ — to a secondary theme in its own film. Within an hour, Tanvi becomes a medium for a misplaced tribute to the Indian Army. The protagonist is patriotism. At one point, the tri-colour is superimposed on her singing face at an army ball; at another, she interrupts a memorial day speech to ask what bravery is so that the answer can be “anyone who wears a uniform”. The love for one's country is presented as the cure for everything."

Rachit Gupta of Filmfare gave 3 stars out of 5 and said that "Tanvi the Great is a heartwarming tale of an unlikely cinematic hero starring Anupam Kher and debutant Shubhangi." A critic of Bollywood Hungama rated it 2/5 stars and observed that "On the whole, TANVI THE GREAT is a heartfelt and well-intentioned film with moments that shine. While the writing and length pose challenges, and the second half loses some momentum, its sincerity is evident." Deepa Gahlot writes for Scroll.in said that "Tanvi The Great is a gooey chocolate of a film – a bit too sweet but also feel-good." Ganesh Aaglave of Firstpost wrotes in his review that "Tanvi The Great explores the inspiring philosophy of achieving one’s goal against all odds, where Anupam Kher masterfully crafts the narrative by infusing it with the emotional elements of kindness, goodness, and compassion."
