= Premi =

- Premi Movie Poster
- Directed by: Rabi Kinagi
- Written by: Rabi Kinagi
- Story by: Sumanth Arts
- Produced by: Surinder Films; Shree Venkatesh Films
- Starring: Jeet; Jisshu Sengupta; Chandana Sharma
- Cinematography: G.Vidyanand
- Edited by: Suresh Oors
- Music by: Jeet Gannguli
- Production companies: Surinder Films; Shree Venkatesh Films
- Distributed by: Eagle Video
- Release date: 30 July 2004
- Country: India
- Language: Bengali

Premi (Bengali: প্রেমী, translated as "Lover") is a Bengali romantic drama film released in 2004. Directed by Rabi Kinagi, the movie featured Jeet, Jisshu Sengupta and Chandana Sharma. This was Chandana Sharma's debut movie It is a remake of the Telugu-language blockbuster film Nee Sneham.

== Plot ==
Rahul and Sumit are best friends and professional players of international football. In saving Rahul from an accident, Sumit injures his own leg, and can no longer play football. Rahul makes a promise to vicariously fulfill Sumit's dreams by becoming a great football player. One day, in a taxi, he meets Puja and falls in love at first sight. She lives with her paternal grandparents. Puja meets Sumit, and admires him for his strength and grit, which survive his being invalided. Puja and her friends go to Goa, and are joined there by Rahul and his friends, who had come for a football match. Puja & Rahul become mutual friends, though she is to be married to another man. That planned marriage is cancelled, after Puja is accused of unsuitable behavior involving Rahul. Puja's grandfather is unable to bear this shock, and dies. Puja misunderstands Rahul, and her friendship with him gives way to hatred.

Rahul tries secretly to help Puja; whenever she lands in any kind of trouble Rahul helps her. He even steals money from his own father, to help Puja; he remains ”in the background”, and contacts her only via letters, in which he presents himself as an unnamed friend. She “falls in love with“ this secret friend, and becomes desperate to meet him. On the day of Holi, Puja, misidentifying Sumit as the secret friend, and thrilled with joy, sends a marriage proposal to his home, via her grandmother, and their wedding plans are finalised. Rahul, heartbroken at the prospect of his one true love marrying his best friend, cannot say anything to Sumit — he still feels indebted to Sumit for having saved his life. She, angered at seeing Rahul, tells him to stay away from her new life.

Finally, all these misunderstandings are resolved, with marriage between Rahul and Puja.

== Cast ==
- Jeet as Rahul
- Jisshu Sengupta as Sumit
- Chandana Sharma as Puja, Rahul's love interest
- Kalyani Mondal as Rahul's mother
- Shantilal Mukherjee as Alok
- Monu Mukherjee as Puja's grandfather
- Kaushik Banerjee
- Chinmoy Roy as Prashanta, football coach
- Subhasish Mukherjee
- Sanghamitra Mukherjee as Suroma, Rahul's paternal aunt
- Bodhisattwa Majumdar as Jayanta, Rahul's father
- Shyamal Dutta as Nirmal, Sumit's father
- Pushpita Mukherjee
- Sagnik Chatterjee as Chintu

== Soundtrack ==
Premi

Soundtrack album by Jeet Gannguli
- Released: 2004
- Recorded: 2003
- Studio: Surinder Films
- Genre: Feature film soundtrack
- Language: Bengali
- Label: SVF

Jeet Gannguli chronology
| Premi (2004) | Bandhan (2004) |

Singles from Premi
- 1. "Mone Rekho Amar E Gaan" Released: 31 May 2018; 2. "Pratham Premer Pratham Chowa" Released: 31 May 2018

All songs were composed by Jeet Ganguli and this was his first film as a music director.

Track listing
| No. | Title | Singer(s) | Length |
|---|---|---|---|
| 1. | "O Bandhure Bandhure Tor" | Zubeen Garg | 3:24 |
| 2. | "Mone Rekho Amar Ea Gaan" (Male Version) | Sonu Nigam |
| 3. | "Mone Rekho Amar Ea Gaan" (Female Version) | Shreya Ghoshal, Sagarika |
| 4. | "Jar Chabi Eai Mon Enke Jai" | Sonu Nigam, Chorus | 4:46 |
| 5. | "Eaki Sathe Eaki Pathe" | Shaan, Zubeen Garg | 4:17 |
| 6. | "Pratham Premer Pratham Chowa" | Shaan, Shreya Ghoshal | 4:39 |
| 7. | "Satti Satti Jadi Pari Hoye" | Shreya Ghoshal | 2:34 |
| 8. | "Mone Rekho Amar Ea Gaan" (Duet) | Shreya Ghoshal, Sonu Nigam | 4:55 |

== Critical reception ==
The two multiplexes feel the dashing combo of the two young Turks of Tollywood and their lady love has the pull to lure in the audiences. "Though it’s not the niche variety, Premi is a well-made, well-publicised urban romantic film which, we feel, will appeal to our audiences. Also because the Salt lake area consists of a large bulk of Bengali cine-goers. If this experiment succeeds, we may go for more such films", revealed a spokesperson for INOX.

Much on the same lines, a spokesperson for 89 Cinemas added: "Premi is targeted at the youth and we think it will click with our viewers.

” While an audio cassette of Premi comes free with every ticket sold (Rs 60 and Rs 80) at the Salt Lake multiplex, the Swabhumi multi-screen is offering a slashed rate of Rs 50. The film rolls out at 6.30 pm, INOX-City Centre, and at 1.15 pm, 89 Cinemas. For masala films with local stars, the emphasis is more on glossy look and feel (read: fresh locales, trendy costumes, stylish interiors). In Shree Venkatesh Films’ Premi, the outdoors were all Gangtok, leading lady Chandana got her costumes designed from Mumbai, the wardrobe for Jeet and Jisshu Sengupta was picked up from Pantaloons, Westside and Forum. The trendy casuals that Koel Mallick sports in Shudhu Tumi, at the Arunachal Pradesh shooting sites, are also from Pantaloons.
