= Maharathi (2008 film) =

- Directed by: Shivam Nair
- Written by: Uttam Gada
- Produced by: Dhillin Mehta
- Starring: Paresh Rawal; Naseeruddin Shah; Neha Dhupia; Om Puri; Boman Irani; Tara Sharma
- Cinematography: Venu
- Edited by: Aarti Bajaj
- Music by: Songs and Lyrics: Shibani Kashyap; Background Score: Rajat Dholakia; Clinton Cerejo
- Release date: 5 December 2008
- Country: India
- Language: Hindi

Maharathi is a 2008 Indian Hindi-language thriller film produced by Dhilin Mehta. The film was directed by Shivam Nair and stars Paresh Rawal, Neha Dhupia, Naseeruddin Shah, Boman Irani, Om Puri and Tara Sharma.The film's music is by Shibani Kashyap. The film is based on the Gujarati language play of the same name which itself was based on James Hadley Chase's novel There's Always a Price Tag.

== Plot ==
The film opens as Jai Singh Adenwaala becomes involved in an accident due to drunk driving but is saved from death by Subhash Sharma. As Jai Singh is seriously drunk, Subhash hails a taxi and decides to drop him home. Once at the Adenwaala Bungalow, Jai Singh invites Subhash inside to thank him. He introduces him to his wife, Malika, a glamorous but shady young lady, and his lawyer and friend, A.D. Merchant. He then ends up hiring Subhash as his chauffeur, much to the chagrin of Mallika. Merchant also develops a dislike for him. Malika tries her best to get Subhash out of the house by framing him for robbery, but Subhash's quick wit and intelligence allow him to save himself.

Adenwaala reveals to Subash that he is neck deep in loans and depressed due to his constant drinking, and Mallika wants to kill him to claim his insurance worth 24 crores after Mallika threw his inhaler out a window when he had an asthma attack; Subash had luckily been there and gave it to Adenwaala in time.

He calls Subhash and Malika and hands Subhash a letter. He then tells Malika about a little change he had made in his insurance policy. According to the conditions in the policy, the insurance money could only be claimed if Adenwaala is murdered and not if he kills himself. Adenwaala says that he knows Malika will try to make his suicide appear to be murder. He also reveals he asked Subhash to stay so he cannot be blamed for his death. Saying this, he shoots himself. Malika rushes to call the police, but Subhash convinces her that together they can prove his suicide a murder.

Subhash offers to collaborate with her on the condition that they will split the insurance money in half. Mallika initially hesitates but eventually accepts Subhash's offer after he reveals the letter he was told to give to Merchant claims Adenwaala asking Merchant to free Mallika from jail if she manages to prove his death a murder and then give the letter to the insurance company so they don't give her the money. Then they decide to hide Jai Adenwaala's body in the freezer to stop it from decaying and place Adenwaala's alcohol bottles on it to divert people's attention from it. They then clear the house of all evidence about Adenwaala's death. They then decide to feign that Adenwaala is in his bedroom and too ill to meet anyone, and then hire a nurse called Swati to place the blame on.

When Swati switches the freezer off, Subhash makes an excuse that it must stay on due to its system. Mallika becomes suspicious of keeping Swati in the house after she nearly opens the freezer one night while sleepwalking and decides to kill her, but Subhash convinces her not to. However, Mallika secretly plans with Merchant to kick Subhash out and take the money for themselves. Subhash then covers his face and feigns to be Adenwaala before he leaves the house with Mallika under the pretence of going to the nursing home and takes her to the milk booth, where he ties her and leaves the car to make it look like goons trapped her and kidnapped Adenwaala. However, Mallika's chair falls in the night, and she dies after breaking her spine, where she is found by the police in the morning. ACP Gokhale calls Merchant to Adenwaala's house and questions them about the night of the disappearance. Merchant tells Gokhale that Adenwaala had not made a will, and Gokhale leaves after leaving a police officer behind to remain guard.

Merchant then reveals to Subhash that Adenwaala did make a will and entrusted all of it to Subhash for saving his life, making Subhash the prime suspect, and revealed he intends to take it to the police in the morning. After making the guarding officer drunk, Subhash opens the freezer, but Merchant unexpectedly appears and discovers the body. Subhash tells him the truth, but claims Mallika planned the whole thing. Merchant decides to take advantage and attempts to make Subhash sign a power of attorney, so Merchant can inherit both the insurance money and will for himself. When Subhash refuses, Merchant takes an awoken Swati at gunpoint, but Gokhale and the police arrive. Subhash falsely blames Merchant for the deaths of Adenwaala and Mallika, so Merchant angrily tries to shoot Subhash, but Gokhale shoots and kills him first.

Subhash uses the insurance and will money to build his own luxurious house, but Swati appears and reveals she realised the shoes that "Adenwaala" was wearing when he left with Mallika to go to the nursing home are the same Subhash is wearing, to which they both laugh and become partners.

== Cast ==
- Paresh Rawal as Subhash Sharma
- Neha Dhupia as Mallika Adenwalla
- Tara Sharma as Swati
- Boman Irani as AD Merchant
- Om Puri as ACP Gokhale
- Naseeruddin Shah as Jaisingh Adenwalla

== Soundtrack ==
No.	Title	Singer(s)	Length
1.	"Maharathi Title Track"	Shibani Kashyap	4:00
