= My Dear Subject =

1988 film

- Directed by: Anne-Marie Miéville
- Written by: Anne-Marie Miéville
- Starring: Gaële Le Roi
- Release date: 18 May 1988 (Cannes)
- Running time: 96 minutes
- Country: Switzerland
- Language: French

My Dear Subject (French: Mon cher sujet) is a 1988 Swiss drama film directed by Anne-Marie Miéville. The film was selected as the Swiss entry for the Best Foreign Language Film at the 62nd Academy Awards, but was not accepted as a nominee.

== Cast ==
- Gaële Le Roi as Angèle
- Anny Romand as Agnès
- Hélène Roussel as Odile
- Yves Neff as Carlo
- Bernard Woringer as François
- Hanns Zischler as Hans
- Marc Darnault as Auguste

== See also ==
- List of submissions to the 62nd Academy Awards for Best Foreign Language Film
- List of Swiss submissions for the Academy Award for Best Foreign Language Film
