= Tony Kirkhope =

British filmmaker and distributor (1949–1997)

- Born: 10 October 1949; Dumbarton, Scotland
- Died: 29 May 1997 (aged 47)
- Occupation(s): Film director and producer
- Spouse: Eva Tarr Kirkhope (m. 1994)

Anthony James Henry Kirkhope (10 October 1949 – 29 May 1997) was a British filmmaker and distributor. He was also the co-founder with Eva Tarr of the Latin American Film Festival.

== Biography ==
=== Film ===
As well as producing and directing films, he founded the Metro Cinema in Rupert Street, Soho, in 1985, and also the Latin American Film Festival, with his wife Eva Tarr, in 1989.

He is credited to have produced a short video piece called Soft and Hard.

=== Personal life ===
In 1994, Kirkhope married Eva Tarr, who was born in Havana, Cuba. A graduate of History of Art and English, she worked for the Women's Film, Television and Video Network (WFTVN) sponsored by the Greater London Council and Channel Four. She was later head of development of Icarus Film, then co-owner and director of Metro Tartan Ltd, and director of Metro Pictures and Metro Cinemas.

He is related to Scottish filmmaker Stewart Hannah.

=== Death ===
He died in his sleep age 47 in 1997.
