= Perneet Chauhan =

Indian television actress

- Born: Perneet Chauhan
- Occupations: Actress, model
- Years active: 2009–2022
- Known for: Do Dil Bandhe Ek Dori Se, Love Ne Mila Di Jodi, Miley Jab Hum Tum

Perneet Chauhan is an Indian film, theatre, and television actress. She starred in Do Dil Bandhe Ek Dori Se and Love Ne Mila Di Jodi.

== Filmography ==
Year	Title	Role	Source
2009-2010	Love Ne Mila Di Jodi	Avni	
2015	Yam Hain Hum	Jaaliya	
2010	Miley Jab Hum Tum	Riya	
2010	Geet - Hui Sabse Parayi	Meera	
2013	Do Dil Bandhe Ek Dori Se	Sumitra	
2017	Aye Zindagi (season 1; episode 3)	Shikha	
2017-2018	Saam Daam Dand Bhed	Tejaswini Singh Baghel	
2021	Humkadam		
2022	Channa Mereya	Gurkirat Amber Singh	
