= Khakee: The Bihar Chapter =

Indian crime thriller series (2022)

- Genre: Crime; Action; Thriller
- Created by: Neeraj Pandey
- Written by: UmaShankar singh
- Directed by: Bhav Dhulia
- Starring: Karan Tacker; Avinash Tiwary; Abhimanyu Singh; Jatin Sarna; Ravi Kishan; Ashutosh Rana; Nikita Dutta; Shraddha Das; Anup Soni
- Composer: Advait Nemlekar
- Country of origin: India
- Original language: Hindi

Production
- Producer: Shital Bhatia
- Cinematography: Hari Nair
- Editor: Praveen Kathikuloth
- Camera setup: Multi-camera
- Running time: 45 minutes
- Production company: Friday Storytellers

Original release
- Network: Netflix
- Release: November 25, 2022 – present

Related
- Khakee: The Bengal Chapter

Khakee: The Bihar Chapter is an Indian action thriller television series created by Neeraj Pandey and written by Umashankar Singh. It was produced by Shital Bhatia, under Friday Storytellers. It stars Karan Tacker, Avinash Tiwary, Abhimanyu Singh, Brijeshwar Singh Jatin Sarna, Ravi Kishan, Ashutosh Rana, Nikita Dutta, Aishwarya Sushmita, Anup Soni, Shraddha Das, Neeraj Kashyap, Sanjay Pandey and Bharat Jha.

The series premiered on Netflix on 25 November 2022. The series was renewed for a standalone sequel series, Khakee: The Bengal Chapter, in August 2023.

== Plot ==
This series is based in Sheikhpura district, Nalanda district and Patna district. Chandan Mahato, who was actually Pintu Mahato in real life, is a member of Ashok Mahto gang, which has been active in Nalanda and Sheikhpura for many years. The story is about how Sheikhpura SP Amit Lodha brings the Ashok Mahto gang to justice, while navigating his personal issues.

== Cast ==
- Karan Tacker as SP Amit Lodha IPS
- Avinash Tiwary as Chandan Mahto based on Ashok Mahto gang case
- Aamir Salim Khan as Vinayak Mahto
- Abhimanyu Singh as SHO Ranjan Kumar
- Brijeshwar Singh as New SHO Rajeev Soni
- Aditi Singh as Ruby Kumari, Sahu's wife
- Jatin Sarna as Dilip “Chawanprash” Sahu
- Ravi Kishan as Abhyuday Singh
- Ashutosh Rana as IG Mukteshwar Chaubey IPS
- Sushil Kumar as ASI Satyaprakash, the mutton guy
- Ashit Kumar as Informer
- Nikita Dutta as Tanu Lodha, Amit's wife
- Aishwarya Sushmita as Meeta Devi, Sahu's wife
- Neeraj Kashyap as Constable Shiv Ram
- Anup Soni as DIG Sudhir Paswan
- Shraddha Das as Saumya Mukherjee
- Amit Anand Raut
- Kali Prasad Mukherjee as Ravinder Mukhiya
- Vinay Pathak as Sri Ujjiyaar Prasad, former CM of Bihar
- Naval Shukla as Sri Sarvesh Kumar, CM of Bihar
- Sanjay Pandey as SHO Kanhaiya Bharadwaj
- Susheel Singh as Bharat “Bharta” Yadav
- Bharat Jha as SI Ajit Kumar
- Vijay Kumar Dogra as Jaiswal
- Meenakshi Chugh as DGP’wife
- Krishiv Jindal as Avi Lodha, Amit Lodha’s son

== Episodes ==
No.	Title	Directed by	Written by	Original release date
1	"Patra Parichay!"	Bhav Dhulia	Umashankar singh	November 25, 2022
2	"Chandanwa Ka Janm!"	Bhav Dhulia	Umashankar singh	November 25, 2022
3	"Amit Kaun ???"	Bhav Dhulia	Umashankar singh	November 25, 2022
4	"Mooh Dikhai !!!"	Bhav Dhulia	Umashankar singh	November 25, 2022
5	"Meeta Ji Ki Love Story !!!"	Bhav Dhulia	Umashankar singh	November 25, 2022
6	"Meeta Ji Ki Love Story Part 2"	Bhav Dhulia	Umashankar singh	November 25, 2022
7	"Phace to Phace"	Bhav Dhulia	Umashankar singh	November 25, 2022

== Production ==
=== Development ===
The series was announced in October 2022, and teaser of the series was released on 28 October 2022. The official trailer was released on 5 November 2022. The series was renewed for a second season in August 2023.

=== Casting ===
Karan Tacker was cast in the titular role, and was joined by Avinash Tiwary as the other lead.

== See also ==
- List of Netflix India originals
- List of Netflix original programming
