= Amit Lodha =

Indian police officer and author (born 1974)

- Born: Amit Lodha; February 22, 1974 (age 52); Jaipur, Rajasthan, India
- Education: St. Xavier's School, Jaipur; Indian Institute of Technology Delhi (B.Tech. in Civil engineering)
- Occupations: Indian Police Service officer Author
- Known for: Bihar Diaries: The True Story of How Bihar's Most Dangerous Criminal Was Caught; Khakee: The Bihar Chapter
- Notable work: Bihar Diaries; Life in the Uniform
- Spouse: Komudi Tanu Lodha
- Police career
- Country: India
- Department: Bihar Police
- Service years: 1998–present
- Rank: Additional Director General of Police
- Batch: 1998
- Cadre: Bihar
- Awards: Police Medal for Gallantry President's Police Medal for Distinguished Service; Utkrisht Seva Padak; Police (Internal Security) Medal IIT Delhi Distinguished Alumni Award (Public Service, 2026)

Amit Lodha (born 22 February 1974) is an Indian Police Service officer of the 1998 batch and the Bihar cadre, and an author. An engineering graduate of the Indian Institute of Technology Delhi (IIT Delhi), he is known for his policing career in Bihar, his service with the Border Security Force (BSF), and his books Bihar Diaries: The True Story of How Bihar's Most Dangerous Criminal Was Caught and Life in the Uniform: Adventures of an IPS Officer in Bihar. His service number is 19981029. As of 2026, he is serving as Additional Director General of Police and head of the State Crime Records Bureau, Bihar

Lodha has served in a number of policing and security assignments, including as Superintendent of Police in Sheikhpura, Bihar, and as an Inspector General in the BSF. His experiences as a police officer formed the basis of Bihar Diaries and subsequently inspired the Netflix crime drama Khakee: The Bihar Chapter. He was promoted to the rank of Additional Director General of Police and, in 2026, was recognised by IIT Delhi with its Distinguished Alumni Award in the Public Service category.

== Early life and education ==
Amit Lodha was born on 22 February 1974 in Jaipur, Rajasthan. He attended St. Xavier's School, Jaipur, before pursuing engineering at the Indian Institute of Technology Delhi.

Lodha graduated from IIT Delhi in 1995 with a Bachelor of Technology degree in Civil Engineering. According to his autobiographical account in Life in the Uniform, his academic performance at IIT Delhi was initially not closely aligned with his later career ambitions. He subsequently turned his attention towards the Union Public Service Commission (UPSC) examinations and a career in public service.

In Life in the Uniform, Lodha describes his transition from engineering to public service, his preparation for the civil services examinations and his early training as a police officer. The book presents his experiences in the form of autobiographical accounts of his professional life in Bihar.

After graduating from IIT Delhi, Lodha pursued a career in law enforcement and was selected for the Central Bureau of Investigation before subsequently qualifying for the Civil Services Examination and entering the Indian Police Service. The details of this early career transition are recounted in his autobiographical writing.

Lodha joined the Indian Police Service in 1998 and was allotted to the Bihar cadre. Official Indian Police Service records identify him as a 1998-batch officer of the Bihar cadre with service number 19981029.

== Police career ==
Lodha joined the Indian Police Service in 1998 and began his career with postings and district training in Bihar. His early service exposed him to policing in areas affected by organised crime, political violence and criminal gangs.

During his early period of district training, Lodha served under senior IPS officer Gupteshwar Pandey. The experience formed part of his early exposure to policing in Bihar and is discussed in accounts of his career.

His subsequent career included assignments in district policing, investigation and senior administrative positions. He later served in the Criminal Investigation Department (CID) of Bihar and was promoted through the ranks of the state police.

=== Sheikhpura ===
One of the most significant periods of Lodha's career was his tenure as Superintendent of Police in Sheikhpura, Bihar. He served in the district during a period marked by organised criminal activity and violence, including the activities of the Ashok Mahto gang.

During his tenure, Lodha led police operations and investigations against members of criminal groups operating in the area. His experiences during this period later formed the basis of his first book, Bihar Diaries.

The investigation involved intelligence gathering, the development of local sources and efforts to locate members of criminal gangs. Bihar Diaries presents Lodha's account of the pursuit and eventual arrest of a major gang figure and the challenges faced by police officers operating in the region.

The arrest of Ashok Mahto received considerable media attention. In August 2006, Mahto was publicly paraded by police personnel while being taken to court, an incident that subsequently became controversial.

=== CID and subsequent postings ===
Lodha subsequently served in the Criminal Investigation Department of Bihar and held a number of policing and investigative assignments in the state. He was promoted to the rank of Deputy Inspector General of Police during his career.

His career subsequently included senior assignments within Bihar Police and a period of central deputation with the Border Security Force.

=== Border Security Force ===
Lodha served on central deputation with the Border Security Force (BSF). He was appointed Inspector General in the BSF after having served as a Deputy Inspector General.

In June 2019, Lodha assumed charge as Inspector General of the Rajasthan Frontier of the BSF. During his tenure, he spoke publicly about strengthening border security through technology, including improved surveillance systems, sensors, modern watchtowers and the concept of smart fencing.

The Rajasthan Frontier covers a large section of India's international border with Pakistan. Lodha's tenure there included public statements concerning border surveillance, infiltration prevention and the use of technology in border management.

=== Additional Director General of Police ===
Lodha was subsequently promoted to the rank of Additional Director General of Police. He later returned to senior assignments within the Bihar Police.

By 2024, he was serving as Inspector General of the State Crime Records Bureau in Bihar, Patna. The Patna High Court records from January and April 2024 identify him in that position.

In 2026, IIT Delhi identified Lodha as Additional Director General of Police and head of the State Crime Records Bureau, Bihar. The institute recognised him with its Distinguished Alumni Award in the Public Service category.

== Writing career ==
=== Bihar Diaries ===
Lodha is the author of Bihar Diaries: The True Story of How Bihar's Most Dangerous Criminal Was Caught, first published in 2018.

The book is based on Lodha's experiences as a police officer and recounts the investigation and pursuit of a criminal gang in Bihar. It draws particularly on his tenure as Superintendent of Police in Sheikhpura and describes the investigation, intelligence gathering and police operations involved in the pursuit of a major criminal group.

The book attracted attention for combining an account of police operations with personal observations about the pressures and difficulties of policing in Bihar. Its events and characters were subsequently adapted for television.

=== Life in the Uniform ===
Lodha later wrote Life in the Uniform: Adventures of an IPS Officer in Bihar. Published by Ebury Press, an imprint of Penguin Random House India, the book presents an autobiographical account of his transition from engineering to public service and his experiences during his early years in the Indian Police Service.

The book includes accounts of his student years at IIT Delhi, his preparation for the civil services examinations, his training as an IPS officer and his early experiences as a police officer in Bihar. It also contains stories involving investigations, criminal cases, law-and-order situations and interactions with colleagues and members of the public.

== Khakee: The Bihar Chapter ==
In 2022, the Netflix crime drama Khakee: The Bihar Chapter was released. The series was inspired by Lodha's book Bihar Diaries and dramatised events associated with police operations against organised criminal groups in Bihar.

The series features a fictionalised police officer whose experiences are based in part on Lodha's career. The characters, chronology and events portrayed in the series were adapted for dramatic purposes and do not constitute a literal account of Lodha's real-life career.

The release of the series brought renewed public attention to Lodha's career, particularly his work in Bihar and the events associated with the arrest of members of criminal gangs.

== Awards and recognition ==
Lodha has received several awards and service medals during his career. According to IIT Delhi's official Distinguished Alumni profile, these include the Police Medal for Gallantry, the President's Police Medal for Meritorious Service, the Utkrisht Seva Medal and the Internal Security Medal.

In 2026, IIT Delhi selected Lodha for its Distinguished Alumni Award in the Public Service category. The institute cited his career in law enforcement, leadership in policing and contributions to public service in announcing the honour.

The award was presented as part of IIT Delhi's 57th convocation in 2026, where the institute recognised alumni in several categories. Lodha was one of the recipients in the Public Service category.

== Legal issues ==
In December 2022, the Special Vigilance Unit (SVU) of Bihar registered a case involving allegations relating to disproportionate assets and the commercial arrangements associated with the publication of Bihar Diaries and its adaptation into a film or web series.

Lodha challenged the FIR before the Patna High Court, seeking its quashing. The case concerned allegations under provisions of the Prevention of Corruption Act, 1988 and the Indian Penal Code.

On 22 January 2024, the Patna High Court declined to quash the FIR and held that the investigation should be allowed to proceed. The court directed the investigating agency to take the investigation to its logical conclusion within six months, while also directing that the investigation be conducted fairly and in accordance with law.

The proceedings arose partly from allegations concerning financial transactions connected with the adaptation of Lodha's written work. The allegations included claims concerning payments made to his wife, Komudi Lodha, in connection with rights associated with the story and her role as a story consultant. These were allegations made during the investigation and were not findings of guilt.

Lodha denied wrongdoing and challenged the allegations in court. The High Court's order made clear that its refusal to quash the FIR did not constitute a final determination of guilt and that the investigation was to continue in accordance with law.

== Personal life ==
Lodha is married to Komudi Tanu Lodha. He has maintained a parallel career as an author while serving in the Indian Police Service.

Amit Lodha on Instagram

== See also ==
- Ashok Mahto gang
- Khakee: The Bihar Chapter
- Bihar Police
- Border Security Force
- Indian Police Service
