= Shivam Nair =

Indian film director

- Born: Shivam Nair; Kerala, India
- Other names: cão
- Occupation: director
- Known for: Ahista Ahista

Shivam Nair is an Indian film and television director and editor who is best known for his television serial Sea Hawks and his 2006 film, Ahista Ahista.

Nair has been working in the television industry since 1982, and has been involved in numerous television series. He assisted Sriram Raghavan on Raman Raghav, A City, A Killer (1991), a docudrama based on serial killer Raman Raghav. He has also directed and edited three other docudramas based on serial killers and murderers Auto Shankar, Ranga Billa and Feroz Daruwalla.

Ahista Ahista, based on a script by Imtiaz Ali was his first feature film as director, and the 2008 film Maharathi, based on the play by Uttam Gada, is his most recent one. His next thriller film Bhaag Johnny starring Kunal Khemu and Zoa Morani released in 2015. The film is produced by T Series.

== Filmography ==
As director

- Ahista Ahista (2006)
- Maharathi (2008)
- Bhaag Johnny (2015)
- Naam Shabana (2017)
- The Diplomat (2025)

=== Television ===
As director

- Special OPS (2020) - Hotstar
- Mukhbir - The Story of a Spy (2022) - also creator
