= Bad Cop - kriminell gut =

German television series

- Starring: David Rott; Daniel Rodic; Alma Leiberg; Victoria Fleer; Nicki von Tempelhoff; Mersiha Husagic; Günter Barton; Siemen Rühaak
- Country of origin: Germany
- Original language: German
- No. of seasons: 1
- No. of episodes: 10

Production
- Producer: Talpa Germany TV
- Running time: 45 min

Original release
- Network: RTL Television
- Release: September 21 – November 16, 2017

Bad Cop - kriminell gut is a German television series that premiered on September 21, 2017 on RTL Television.

== Plot ==
The twin brothers Jesko and Jan Starck (David Rott) lead very different lives. While Jesko became a successful detective inspector, Jan has taken the career of a criminal and is thus on the other side of the law. But in a fateful moment, everything suddenly changes when Jesko is fatally injured in a police operation involving Jan. Jan then takes on the identity of his deceased twin brother to save his own life.

== See also ==
- List of German television series
