= Goodbye to Language =

2014 film by Jean-Luc Godard

- Theatrical release poster
- Directed by: Jean-Luc Godard
- Written by: Jean-Luc Godard
- Produced by: Alain Sarde; Brahim Chioua; Vincent Maraval
- Starring: Héloïse Godet; Kamel Abdeli; Richard Chevallier; Zoé Bruneau
- Cinematography: Fabrice Aragno
- Edited by: Jean-Luc Godard; Fabrice Aragno
- Production companies: Canal+; Centre national du cinéma et de l'image animée
- Distributed by: Wild Bunch
- Release dates: 21 May 2014 (Cannes); 28 May 2014 (France)
- Running time: 69 minutes
- Countries: France; Switzerland
- Language: French
- Box office: 33,225 tickets (France); $390,099 (US)

Goodbye to Language (French: Adieu au Langage) is a 2014 French-Swiss narrative essay film written and directed by Jean-Luc Godard. It stars Héloïse Godet, Kamel Abdeli, Richard Chevallier, Zoé Bruneau, Jessica Erickson and Christian Grégori and was shot by cinematographer Fabrice Aragno. It is Godard's 42nd feature film and 121st film or video project, and his first to use 3D film technology. In the French-speaking parts of Switzerland where it was shot, the word "adieu" can mean both goodbye and hello. The film depicts a couple having an affair. The woman's husband discovers the affair and the lover is killed. Two pairs of actors portray the couple and their actions repeat and mirror one another. Godard's own dog Roxy Miéville has a prominent role in the film and won a prize at the Cannes Film Festival. Like many of Godard's films, it includes numerous quotes and references to previous artistic, philosophical and scientific works, most prominently those of Jacques Ellul, Aleksandr Solzhenitsyn and Mary Shelley.

Godard became interested in making a 3D film in 2010 and asked Aragno to make some camera tests. Aragno was dissatisfied with the results of professional 3D cameras and built his own custom rigs using Canon 5Ds and Flip Minos, breaking many of the standard rules for 3D cinematography. Godard and Aragno worked on the film for four years, each shooting footage independently before officially beginning production with the actors. Godard edited a 2D version of the film before he and Aragno perfected the 3D cut with color correction and surround sound.

Adieu au langage premiered in competition at the 2014 Cannes Film Festival and won the Jury Prize. It was distributed in France by Wild Bunch and in the US by Kino Lorber, and won Best Picture at the 2014 National Society of Film Critics Awards. It received a generally positive reception and was listed as one of the best films of the year on several critics lists. In particular, praise went to its visual style, while criticism was levied at the plot, which some found incomprehensible. Many critics have attempted to analyze the film's themes and its use of 3D.

Some of the film's more elaborate shots have been called innovative techniques of the film vocabulary. These include a "separation" shot in which a single, unbroken shot splits into two separate shots that can be viewed simultaneously through either the left or the right eye, and then returns to one single 3D shot. Aragno and Godard also experimented with double exposure 3D images and shots with parallax that are difficult for the human eye to see.

== Synopsis ==
"The idea is simple / A married woman and a single man meet / They love, they argue, fists fly / A dog strays between town and country / The seasons pass / The man and woman meet again / The dog finds itself between them / The other is in one, / the one is in the other / and they are three / The former husband shatters everything / A second film begins: / the same as the first, / and yet not / From the human race we pass to metaphor / This ends in barking / and a baby's cries / In the meantime, we will have seen people talking of the demise of the dollar, of truth in mathematics and of the death of a robin."

— Godard in a handwritten synopsis written in verse and first posted on Twitter

Goodbye to Language is an experimental narrative that tells two similar versions of a couple having an affair. These two stories are named "1 Nature" and "2 Metaphor", and they respectively focus on the couples Josette and Gédéon and Ivitch and Marcus, along with a dog.

The film begins with "1 Nature" at the Nyon cultural center. A young couple, Marie and her boyfriend, are setting up a used bookstand. Another couple, Davidson and Isabelle, arrive. From the way that Marie, her boyfriend, and later the character Ivitch address Davidson, it appears that he is a professor. Brandishing a copy of The Gulag Archipelago, Davidson remarks that its author, Aleksandr Solzhenitsyn, did not need to use Google to search for the book's subtitle. The professor then asks Isabelle what thumbs used to be for before smartphones, making a punning reference to the French children's story Hop-o'-My-Thumb. He proceeds to deliver an impromptu lecture on the ideas of Jacques Ellul, such as the abdication of individual rights and responsibilities to the state, a situation that Ellul declared to be the triumph of Adolf Hitler. Abruptly a car drives up, a man gets out and, speaking in German, accosts Josette, who has been standing nearby. After demanding that she come home (implying that the man is Josette's husband), threatening her with consequences, and trying to drag her away, the man retreats out of frame and fires shots from a gun. As the other characters rush to where the shots were fired, the car departs. Josette wanders away, while Gédéon, who has been watching all along, follows her. As Josette washes her hands in a fountain, Gédéon approaches and declares to her, "I am at your service."

The film switches to "2 Metaphor". At the Nyon lakefront, Davidson is sitting on a bench looking through a book of Nicolas de Staël reproductions when Marie and her boyfriend arrive to say goodbye before they go to the United States. Ivitch arrives, dressed like Davidson in matching trench coat and hat. While the two discuss the tyranny of images, the German-speaking man arrives and the scene plays out as before: he accosts Ivitch, fires his gun, and leaves. As before, a man approaches the shaken woman. This time it is the man that is offscreen and the woman who is onscreen (Ivitch behind metal bars, an image used in promotion of the film). The man, Marcus, puts his hand on the bars and declares, "I am at your service."

The film returns to "1 Nature." Gédéon and Josette are having an affair and staying in a house together in the summer; they discuss literature and domestic issues. Gédéon references Rodin's The Thinker while sitting on a toilet and declares that people are made equal through the act of defecating. At some point, the scene shifts to Nyon, where Marie examines an unidentified man's body. Returning to Gédéon and Josette's affair, the dog Roxy frolics in the countryside as a narrator talks about humans' relationship with dogs. He wanders into a car with Gédéon and Josette, who bring him home and continue talking with Roxy present. Josette mentions a knife that Gédéon gave her four years earlier. Gédéon and Josette leave to board a ferry, leaving Roxy behind.

The film returns to "2 Metaphor." Marcus and Ivitch have an affair in the same house in the winter; they talk about painting and political issues, such as Mao Zedong's opinion of the French Revolution and how Russians will never be Europeans. They have an argument while showering together, followed by shot of a bloody knife in a sink. As their relationship deteriorates, Ivitch reminds Marcus that he told her "I am at your service." Marcus says they should have children. Ivitch says that they should get a dog instead.

In an epilogue, "3 Memory/historical misfortune", Roxy is again in the countryside while a voiceover narration representing Roxy's thoughts (and paraphrasing Clifford D. Simak's Time and Again) wonders what the water is trying to tell him. A narrator mentions that Mary Shelley wrote Frankenstein near the couple's house in Cologny; Shelley is seen in the country writing her book with quill and ink and is joined by Lord Byron and Percy Shelley. An unseen man and woman (Godard and Florence Colombani) paint with watercolors and black ink. They order Roxy out of the room and (paraphrasing Dostoyevsky's Demons) compare Kirillov's two questions, "a big one and a little one" (the other world and suffering) and the "difficult[y of] fit[ting] flatness into depth" to the act of creating art. Roxy falls asleep on a couch as a narrator (Anne-Marie Miéville) describes his thoughts and the film ends with the sounds of a dog barking and a baby crying.

=== References to other works ===
Like many of Godard's films, Goodbye to Language contains numerous references to other works of art or science intertwined within the narrative. It includes clips from such films as Boris Barnet's By the Bluest of Seas, Rouben Mamoulian's Dr. Jekyll and Mr. Hyde, Jean-Pierre Melville's Les Enfants terribles, Artur Aristakisyan's Ladoni, Fritz Lang's Metropolis, Howard Hawks's Only Angels Have Wings, Robert Siodmak's People on Sunday, Alexandre Aja's Piranha 3D and Henry King's The Snows of Kilimanjaro. It verbally quotes Jean Cocteau's Testament of Orpheus without showing any clips and uses archival footage from political events of the 20th century, such as Nazi Germany and the Soviet Union.

The film references or quotes several writers of literature, science, philosophy and political theory. These include both direct quotes (often paraphrased by characters or unseen narrators) and copies of books seen in shots. The references include Alain's Feelings, Passions and Signs, Jean Anouilh's Antigone, Guillaume Apollinaire's Alcools, Louis Aragon's Elsa, je t'aime, Alain Badiou's The Rebirth of History, Samuel Beckett's The Image, Joceyln Benoist's Concepts: Introduction to Analysis, Maurice Blanchot's Awaiting Oblivion, Jorge Luis Borges' The Book of Sand, Louis-Ferdinand Céline's The Church and Letter to Elie Faure, Jacques Chardonne's Eva or the Interrupted Journal, Pierre Clastres' Society Against the State, Jean-Paul Curnier's A World at War, Charles Darwin's The Descent of Man, and Selection in Relation to Sex, Jacques Derrida's The Animal That Therefore I Am, Françoise Dolto's The Gospel at the Risk of Psychoanalysis, Fyodor Dostoyevsky's Demons, Jacques Ellul's The Victory of Hitler?, Gustave Flaubert's Sentimental Education, Hadrien France-Lanord's Heidegger: Thought Irreducible to its Errors, Didier Franck's Nietzsche and the Shadow of God, Sigmund Freud's Introductory Lectures on Psycho-Analysis, Julien Green's Journal, Victor Hugo's Expiation, Emmanuel Levinas's Totality and Infinity, Cesar Pavese's The House on the Hill, Ezra Pound's Works and Usury: Three Essays, Marcel Proust's Jean Santeuil and La Prisonnière, Rainer Maria Rilke's Duino Elegies, George Sand's Elle et Lui and Lettres à Alfred de Musset, Louis Antoine de Saint-Just's Rapport à la convention, March 3, 1794, Jean-Paul Sartre's Being and Nothingness, The Age of Reason, Nausea and The Traitor, Mary Shelley's Frankenstein, Percy Bysshe Shelley's Peter Bell the Third, Clifford D. Simak's Time and Again and City, Philippe Sollers's Interview with Philippe Forest, Paul Valéry's Aphorismes, François Villon's Hanged Man's Ballad, Ludwig Wittgenstein's Philosophical Investigations, Aleksandr Solzhenitsyn's The Gulag Archipelago, Léon Brunschvicg's Descartes et Pascal, lecteurs de Montaigne, A. E. van Vogt's The World of Null-A, V.S. Naipaul's A Bend in the River, Mao Zedong (or Zhou Enlai's) famous "too early to tell" quote, Laurent Schwartz's Theory of Distributions, Paul Dirac's Dirac delta function, Plato's proverb "beauty is the splendour of the truth" and works by Bernhard Riemann, Jack London and Luc Ferry. It also includes references to Claude Monet and Auguste Rodin's The Thinker and images by painter Nicolas de Staël.

Godard even quotes himself: "Showing a forest, easy. But showing a room with a forest nearby, difficult" is paraphrased from Godard's 1958 review of Alexandre Astruc's film Une Vie. Some of the references are false, such as a Marcel Proust quote erroneously attributed to Claude Monet and a quote by William Faulkner that is not traceable in his known works.

Music in the film includes Alfredo Bandelli's folk song The Witch Hunt, sung by Pino Masi. There are also brief fragments of Ludwig van Beethoven's Symphony No. 7, Second Movement, Giya Kancheli's Abii Ne Viderem, Dobrinka Tabakova's Suite in Old Style, Part II, Pyotr Ilyich Tchaikovsky's Slavic March, Arnold Schoenberg's Transfigured Night, Jean Sibelius's Symphony No. 2 and Valse triste and Valentyn Sylvestrov's Holy God.

== Cast ==
- Héloïse Godet as Josette
- Kamel Abdeli as Gédéon
- Richard Chevallier as Marcus
- Zoé Bruneau as Ivitch
- Christian Grégori as Davidson
- Daniel Ludwig as the husband
- Jessica Erickson as Mary Shelley
- Alexandre Païta as Lord Byron
- Dimitri Basil as Percy Shelley
- Roxy Miéville as the dog
- Marie Ruchat as Marie, the red-haired girl
- Jeremy Zampatti as the young man
- Isabelle Carbonneau as Isabelle
- Jean-Luc Godard as the unseen man
- Florence Colombani as the unseen woman
- Anne-Marie Miéville as a narrator
- Gino Siconolfi
- Alain Brat
- Stéphane Colin
- Bruno Allaigre

== Production ==
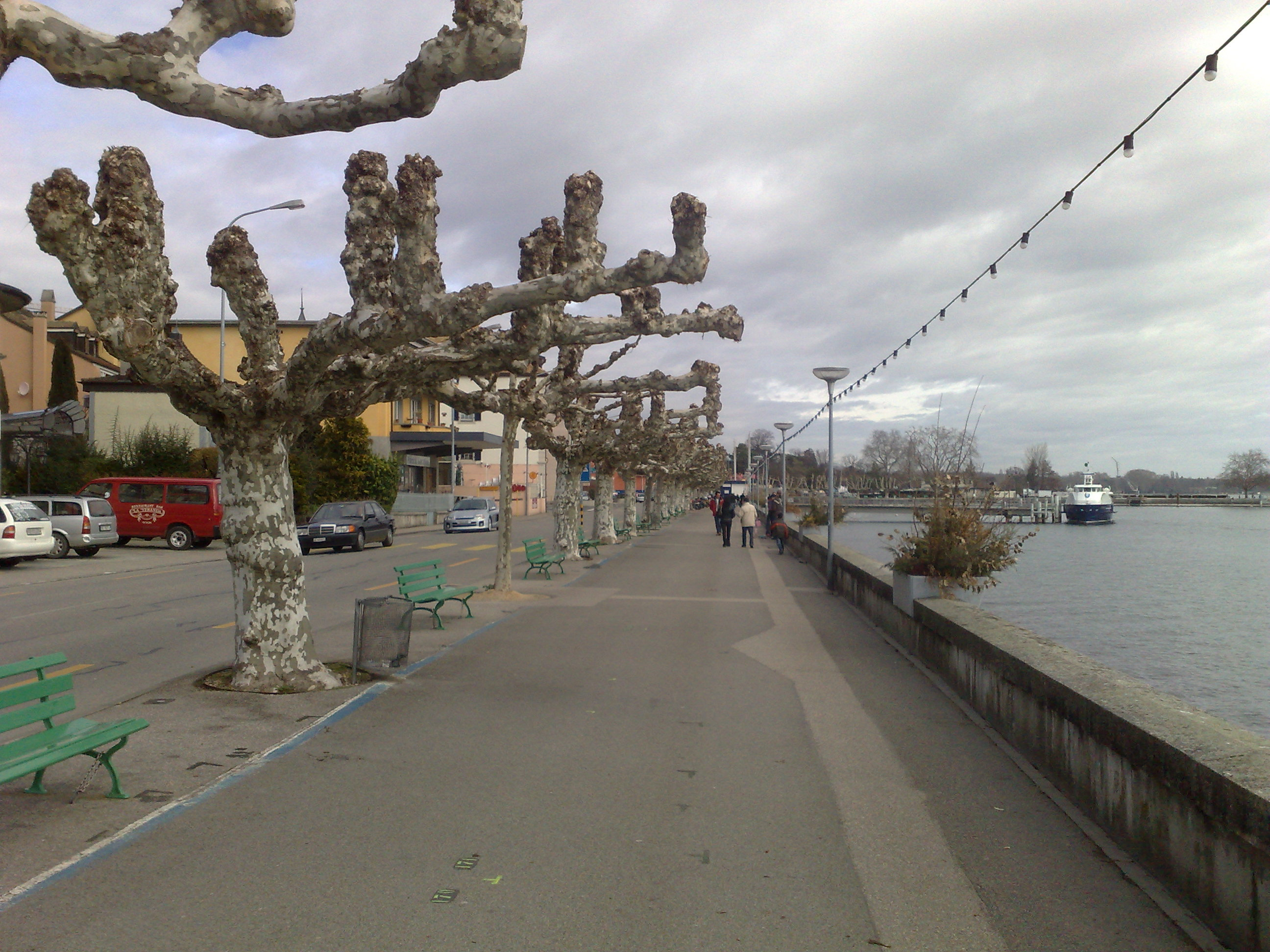
Scenes from the film were shot on the Nyon lake front off of Lake Geneva.

Godard first announced plans for the film during the 2010 Cannes Film Festival, when he said its title would be Adieu au langage. In a November 2010 interview, he joked that he wanted to cast Humphrey Bogart and Ava Gardner, and said, "it's about a man and his wife who no longer speak the same language. The dog they take on walks then intervenes and speaks." He also revealed his interest in 3D and the possibility of using his own dog in the film. Godard initially wanted to cast major stars in the lead roles and asked Sophie Marceau and Vincent Cassel to play the couple. Cassel refused and Godard decided to use unknown actors instead. That year Godard had contemplated retirement, but according to his longtime cinematographer Fabrice Aragno, "he cannot live without making films."

Filming took place in Switzerland, including at Nyon near Lake Geneva and at Godard's home in Rolle. Godard worked with minimal equipment and a small crew, including Aragno, Godard's assistant Jean-Paul Battaggia and a "young man who ensures that the actors and props don't go missing and no passersby wander into the frame." All the equipment fit into a single van and included two 3D cameras, a handheld camera which Godard operated, a sound recorder and an umbrella. Godard said he preferred working with small crews instead of larger ones "as there are for American films where they are allowed to have forty people. Because, if there are fewer of them, they feel too lonely." The film's footage was shot over four years.

Godard wrote a detailed script for the film that included both text and storyboards, but instead of a traditional script, the scenario consisted of "a series of written prose pieces with jottings and ideas." Kamel Abdeli said that he had to Google all the references in the script so that he could understand it: "you couldn't read the scenario – you could feel it and look at it." Actor Daniel Ludwig wrote, "Alongside sibylline texts and the master's own handmade collages and images, the screenplay is wildly, chaotically, wonderfully suggestive, an artwork."

Both the female lead (Héloïse Godet and Zoé Bruneau) and the male lead (Kamel Abdeli and Richard Chevallier) were cast to physically resemble each other. The scenes with Bruneau and Chevallier were shot in the summer, the scenes with Godet and Abdeli in the winter. The actors waited two and a half years to begin shooting after being cast due to constant delays. After rehearsing for two years, Abdelli traveled from Paris to Rolle for the first day of shooting, only to discover that Godard had changed his mind. Bruneau's 2014 memoir Waiting for Godard chronicles the making of the film. Godard often rewrote scenes the night before filming and allowed no improvisation on set, aside from minor screen blocking. One such improvisation involved an actress sitting in front of a lamp, resulting in lens flare that Aragno called "magic" in 3D. Godet said that Godard's direction was "very precise and very gentle, but clear and no discussion about it." There was very little rehearsal time for the actors, but Aragno took a lot of time to set up each shot. Godet said that "the set was silent and focused. Dedicated. But [Godard's] steel attitude would occasionally melt into a warm smile. He came up with funny jokes or proved extremely thoughtful towards us." French film historian Florence Colombani was asked to travel to Godard's home and act in the film, then discovered that he only wanted to film her hands drawing the Cross of Lorraine while she spoke her dialogue.

Aragno said that he and Godard did not want to use 3D as a typical special effect or gimmick. Instead, they wished to use it "to express new things." Several cameras were used, but most of the film was shot on the Canon 5D and the Canon 1DC. Other cameras included GoPros and Lumixes. Aragno used Leica lenses on the Canons "because the Canon lenses are too perfect... How can you fall in love with a digitally perfect person? To err is human! The Leica lenses have some involuntary imperfections." The Canon cameras allowed them to shoot most of the film using natural or available light sources. Godard intentionally framed shots for 3D images, such as when the character's shadows are in 2D but the sidewalk is in 3D. The dog in the film is Godard's own pet Roxy Miéville, whom Godard would film whenever he took him for a walk. Godard used consumer cameras from Fujifilm and Sony for these shots. Aragno also shot some footage independently before production officially began, including shots of his two children running around olive trees.

Aragno recorded the sound during production and was later the sound mixer during post-production. Godard edited a 2D rough cut of the film before he and Aragno worked on the 3D final cut. Godard edited the first cut alone on HDCAM. Aragno said that:

When he wants to insert something, he overlaps the images...Jean-Luc separates the images he's editing from the editing console. He arranges the screen perpendicular to the console so that there's nothing between him and the image. He has to turn away to make the edit. He decides edits very quickly. After he's seen all the footage, he uses small thumbnails from photocopied or printed images of each scene, and makes books, gluing each image to a page.

Aragno used Godard's first cut to manually synchronize the left and right images into the first 3D cut, which he said "took some time!" Godard was initially disappointed with the cut, which "had mono sound and very little color correction." On 18 March Aragno arranged a screening of a 3D cut with a stereo soundtrack for Godard at a Paris movie theater. Aragno said that they also edited a 2D version of the film that "layers the two images like a double exposure", which Godard thought might be the version screened at the Cannes Film Festival. Godard had not seen any 3D footage of the film until this screening and was immediately happy with the final result.

The editing of the final cut took two weeks at Godard's home, which they nicknamed "Chez les Anglais". Godard and Aragno "set up three synchronized computers, Pro Tools for the Surround sound mix, Da Vinci Resolve for color correction and 3-D managing, and Final Cut to play what was rendered by DaVinci synched with the ProTools sound mix. The idea was to mix, color correct, and edit at the same time in HD 3-D. We edited two minutes a session."

=== 3D innovations ===
"In one scene we see a woman and an older man, her lover, sitting on a bench. A second man, her husband, appears with a gun and pulls the woman out of the shot and to the right. But instead of cutting back and forth between the action going on in the separate shots, Aragno used two cameras to capture both in 3D. The result is a layered image of the woman and her husband combined with the left-hand-side image of the man on the bench. If you close one eye, you will only see the woman and her husband, if you close the other you will only see the man on the bench, and if both eyes are open your brain will struggle to view them simultaneously. Yet at the end of the wild visual experiment, the separated images join back together in what Aragno has called a "romantic effect."

— Erin Whitney of The Huffington Post describing the first experimental "separation" shot of the film.

Shortly after finishing Film Socialism (and after the success of the American 3D film Avatar) Godard asked Aragno to shoot some test footage in 3D. With assistance from Battaggia and cinematographer Paul Grivas (Godard's nephew), Aragno researched and experimented with 3D techniques and built his own custom camera rigs. He began by using "an expensive Panasonic camera that had built-in 3-D", but was unimpressed with the results. In his experiments Arango concluded that the standard "rules" for 3D cinematography ("You can't be more than six centimeters between the two cameras. If the background and foreground are too far away, it cannot be good.") were not interesting. Aragno then built a rig out of wood with two Canon 5Ds, which he said "was much more rough and expressive. Normally in two-camera 3-D, the cameras are very close together to minimize the parallax. With the rig I built, the two 5Ds were about five centimeters apart, producing a much harder 3-D image." In his rig, one of the cameras was upside down "so I could register the sensors in the same angle-of-view for perfect or 'imperfect' 3D, avoiding parallax and so to get the best effect from both cameras. There were no computers involved in this calibration. Just a hammer and a chisel. It is artisan filmmaking."

Aragno built another rig with two Flip Mino cameras that allowed one of the cameras to pan. In a test with two children, Aragno said he:

asked the boy to go to the kitchen on my right, and the right camera followed him and the left stayed, so the 3D broke. The girl is in your left eyes and the boy on the right. When he was in the kitchen, your brain didn't know how to watch. It hurts to watch a little, but it was interesting, and when the boy comes back to the girl, the two cameras were again in classic 3D. So I showed it to Jean-Luc and he decided to use this for the film.

Aragno also experimented with the distance between the two cameras, sometimes moving them closer or farther away than the industry standard of six centimeters. Aragno later told The Huffington Post, "I began thinking about making something in 3D that can only be in 3D ... 3D means two images, one left and one right, and both can be together, but you can also make one image different than the other."

This technique of separating the 3D image has been called a new shot in filmmaking, although it is partially comparable to shots in the first 3D feature film The Power of Love. Calum Marsh of The Dissolve said that "the vocabulary of the cinema has been enriched. There is a new tool available to filmmakers: a new technique, like the jump cut before it", and that in his previous films Godard has "been searching for a way to unify ideas—to join disparate images to create a new one. This shot is the realization." Erin Whitney of The Huffington Post wrote that "The moment is so innovative and unusual that Godard and his cinematographer, Fabrice Aragno, didn't even have a name for it (Aragno has referred to the shot as "separation," for lack of a better term)." David Ehrlich of The Dissolve has called the technique a "choose your own adventure" shot and wrote, "by rendering the disparate images separate but simultaneous, Godard has found a way for viewers to compare separate images at the moment they see them. Goodbye To Language effectively argues that every cut is porous, and that seeing is just looking, if it's distracted by memory." Amy Taubin of Film Comment called the shot "a mind-boggling, eyeball-dislocating, narratively profound sequence" and reported that after the shot concluded the audience erupted into applause at the film's premiere during the Cannes film festival. Jonathan Romney of Film Comment said that "it's in-camera magic of a Méliès vintage: a piece of cheap trickery, but brilliantly and simply carried off, finding hitherto unsuspected delight in a simple 'improper' use of 3-D."

Aragno also experimented with 3D images in post-production. These included "tests overlapping and combining 2-D and 3-D images. I wanted to 'encrust' different images and work on different planes in space" and mixing different 2D images to create double exposure 3D images. Godard later used some of these tests in his short film Les trois désastres, included in the 2013 omnibus film 3x3D.

== Reception ==
=== Cannes Film Festival premiere ===
Goodbye to Language premiered on 21 May 2014 at the Lumière Theater in competition at the 2014 Cannes Film Festival. Godard was expected to attend the festival, but announced that he would not a few days before the screening. He told Radio Télévision Suisse that he did not want the Palme d'Or and would give it to his tax advisor if he won, just as he had done with his Honorary Oscar. Shortly afterward he sent retiring festival president Gilles Jacob and artistic director Thierry Frémaux a video letter explaining his absence from the festival and state of mind. The video letter was intended to be private, but Jacob released it to the public as a short film called Letter in Motion to Gilles Jacob and Thierry Fremaux. Main competition jury president Jane Campion said, "the fact that he throws narrative away, it's like a poem. I found myself awakened. This was a free man." Amy Taubin attended the first screening and called the film a masterpiece, writing that it "might be his most beautiful, Mozartian in its lightness, and unrestrained in communicating feelings about love." Manohla Dargis of The New York Times wrote, "finally, the competition lineup had something it has desperately needed all week: a thrilling cinematic experience that nearly levitated the packed 2,300-seat Lumière theater here, turning just another screening into a real happening", and called it "deeply, excitingly challenging."

=== Critical reception ===
On review aggregator website Rotten Tomatoes, Goodbye to Language has an approval rating of 88% based on 73 reviews, with an average rating of 7.1/10. The website's critical consensus reads, "As visually thrilling as it is inscrutable, Goodbye to Language 3D offers a late-period masterpiece from a legendary director still very much in control of his craft." On Metacritic, the film has a weighted average score of 75 out of 100, based on 28 critics, indicating "Generally favorable reviews".

In France, Isabelle Regnier of Le Monde called it "a very beautiful film...from a man who has given his life to cinema...and profoundly changed the history of cinema." Gérard Lefort and Olivier Séguret of Libération praised both its "dazzling technical prowess" and its mockery of the 3D process. Jean-Michel Frodon of Slate compared the results of the "separation" shots to a 1956 article Godard wrote for Cahiers du cinéma about the approximation of "multiple images" and said that Godard should receive a (nonexistent) "Nobel Prize in Cinema" for putting his theory into practice. Antoine de Baecque said that the film remained faithful to the ideals of the French New Wave by being "absolutely contemporary" and telling the truth of the modern age. Jean-Baptiste Doulcet of Benzine Magazine wrote that it "has nothing to justify and will not be content to please" and criticized its toilet humour and complexity, but called it "light and sometimes touching!" Éric Neuhoff of Le Figaro wrote that Godard was an "old senile adolescent" who had "lost his inspiration" and "has learned nothing about love, the couple [or] society", and mocked the film's 15-minute standing ovation at the Cannes Film Festival.

David Bordwell called it "the best new film I've seen this year, and the best 3D film I've ever seen." Richard Brody of The New Yorker wrote that the film's "3-D technique is the first advance in deep-focus camerawork since the heyday of Orson Welles." Scott Foundas of Variety wrote that the film "continually reaffirms that no single filmmaker has done more to test and reassert the possibilities of the moving image during the last half-century of the art form." In The New York Times A. O. Scott called it "baffling and beautiful, a flurry of musical and literary snippets arrayed in counterpoint to a series of brilliantly colored and hauntingly evocative pictures." J. Hoberman of The New York Review of Books called it "an exalted experience" and said "watching it is something like encountering motion pictures for the first time." Jonathan Rosenbaum wrote that watching it made him "feel that I'm experiencing the real possibilities of 3-D for the first time." Scout Tafoya of RogerEbert.com said that "Godard has recalibrated 3D into a revolutionary new investigative tool, a sensory marvel, and fittingly, the experience of watching 'Goodbye To Language' is akin to forcing your brain to experience a violent re-birth into a new age, one we haven't named yet." Blake Williams of Cinema Scope Magazine compared it to Stan Brakhage's Dog Star Man and Michael Snow's *Corpus Callosum, calling it "an 'avant-garde' work in the original and most literal sense of the term."

Some reviews were negative. Thomas Lee of San Francisco Chronicle wrote, "a mishmash of jumbled images, annoying jump cuts and pretentious philosophy/pseudo-psychobabble, the movie will no doubt appeal to hard-core fans of Godard ... But for the rest of us Americans who prefer some semblance of coherence and meaningful thought, 'Goodbye to Language' will sorely disappoint." Daniel Engber of Slate criticized the film's incoherent plot but praised its 3D innovations. Marc Mohan of The Oregonian called it "a dense collage of sound and image, without a coherent narrative, that deconstructs cinema and history in provocative and often incomprehensible ways."

=== Top film lists and awards ===
Goodbye to Language was one of the most acclaimed films of 2014 and appeared on several critics' year-end best film lists. Critics who listed the film as the best film of the year include Carlo Chatrian, Scott Foundas, J. Hoberman, John Powers, James Quandt, Jean-François Rauger, Jonathan Rosenbaum, Dan Sullivan, Amy Taubin, Armond White, and Blake Williams. The staffs of Cahiers du Cinéma, Film Comment and the British Film Institute's Sight & Sound all listed it as 2nd place.

Other critics who listed it as one of the year's best films include Kong Rithdee, Michael Atkinson, Richard Brody, David Ehrenstein, Dennis Lim, Richard Corliss, Mathieu Macheret, Jonathan Romney, Molly Haskell, Miriam Bale, Ignatiy Vishnevetsky, Manohla Dargis and Michael Phillips, and the staffs of Reverse Shot, The Village Voice, IndieWire, CineVue and The A.V. Club.

At the 2014 National Society of Film Critics Awards it was voted Best Picture. Godard came in second place for Best Director and Aragno came in third place for Best Cinematography. In France it was nominated for the 2014 Louis Delluc Prize, but lost to Clouds of Sils Maria. In 2016, it was voted the 49th best film of the 21st century as picked by 177 film critics from around the world.

=== Festivals and release ===
At the 2014 Cannes Film Festival it won the Jury Prize, which it shared with Xavier Dolan's Mommy. Godard's dog Roxy won the Prix special Palm Dog Award. It was later screened at such festivals as the 2014 Locarno International Film Festival in the "Fuori concorso" section, 2014 Toronto International Film Festival in the "Masters" section, and the 2014 New York Film Festival.

It premiered in Paris at an advanced screening at Le Panthéon theatre on 24 May 2014. It was theatrically released in France on 28 May by Wild Bunch and sold 33,225 tickets. It was distributed in North America by Kino Lorber, which released a 3D Blu-ray DVD in 2015. It premiered in the US at the New York Film Festival on 27 September 2014 and released theatrically on 29 October. It earned $27,000 on its opening weekend at two theaters, earning the highest per screen average of the weekend. It earned $390,099 in the US.

== Themes and interpretations ==
"When - the sun already piercing - the river still sleeping in the dreams of fog, we do not see it anymore than it sees itself. Here it is already the river, and the eye is arrested, one no longer sees anything but a void, a fog which prevents one from seeing farther. In that part of the canvas, one must paint neither what one sees, since one sees nothing, nor what one doesn't see, since one must paint only what one sees; but to paint what one doesn't see."

— Quote used in the film's narration, attributed to Claude Monet, but actually paraphrased from Marcel Proust's Jean Santeuil

Many film critics have complained that Goodbye to Language is difficult to understand. Todd McCarthy of The Hollywood Reporter wrote, "there are only fragments of thoughts, nothing is developed." Charles Ealy of Austin 360 compared it to watching Mike Myers's Sprockets sketch from Saturday Night Live. Bordwell has criticized other reviewers' shallow analysis of the film, stating that "critics put off by Godard, I think, have too limited a notion of what criticism is."

Bordwell has called the film opaque, with characters that are difficult to interpret, unexplained conflicts, and major plot points that occur off-camera. Godard also sometimes frames characters to make them unrecognizable to the audience, films scenes with overlapping dialogue of characters on and off screen, and uses ellipses in scenes to create gaps in time. He also sometimes cuts to black frames, objects in the scene, or landscapes while dialogue from the scene is still heard. These techniques make the film both difficult to interpret and to comprehend. Bordwell believes "we ought to find problems of comprehension fascinating. They remind us of storytelling conventions we take for granted, and they push toward other ways of spinning yarns, or unraveling them." Bordwell believes that "blocking or troubling our story-making process serves to re-weight the individual image and sound. When we can't easily tie what we see and hear to an ongoing plot, we're coaxed to savor each moment as a micro-event in itself, like a word in a poem or a patch of color in a painting."

This "opaque" technique has been Godard's trademark style for many years. In 1995 Jean-Michel Frodon described the same complexities as Bordwell and wrote:

when viewing a Godard film there are moments when one has the tendency to resist the experience. As the film unfolds you are suddenly confused, you don't quite grasp something and you feel like you are losing your footing. On the point of drowning one is liable to think Godard is vague and obscure but then there is a maritime movement/shift and if one lets oneself be carried by the next wave that comes one soon recovers the drift of the film.

When asked about the film's message, Godard rejected the premise of the question and contended, "rather, it would be the message of the absence of a message. It's a message in everyday life." Colin MacCabe wrote that the film has no story:

Instead there are patterns of images and sound overlaid with quotations from the authors ... There is the concern with history, above all Hitler and Nazism, and the understanding of history as making no distinction between image and reality, so that the history of the cinema and the history of the modern world wind in and out of each other.

The film's title has a double meaning. In Vaud, the French-speaking part of Switzerland where Godard was raised and lived, the word "adieu" can mean both goodbye and hello "according to the time of day, the tone of voice." Godard acknowledged that this interpretation would only be understood in Vaud and said "nowadays, it seems that talking has nothing to do, that speech no longer exists." He believed that words are losing all meaning and that "we are missing the point ... when I say 'Farewell' to language, it really means 'Farewell', meaning to say goodbye to my own way of speaking." But Godard believed that images, like films that mix words and visuals, are still capable of meaningful communication, citing Islamic and Christian prohibitions of certain images while allowing words as an example. Godard said that in the sequence with Mary Shelley and himself painting with watercolors he wanted to visually show the physical acts of the language of writing and the language of visual art. Bordwell believes that a theme of the film is "the idea that language alienates us from some primordial connection to things."

=== Use of 3D ===
Godard became interested in 3D because "it is still an area where there are no rules" and thought it was interesting because it had not yet been explored to its full potential. Godard thinks that technology, like a movie camera, "reveal[s] something cultural", such as what it "mean[s] about the times it emerged from" and also how it is limited by what it cannot do. Cinematic techniques such as CinemaScope, dolly shots, close-ups or high fidelity are thought of as innovative, but actually create limitations by setting standards and rules in technique. He compares his experiments with 3D to early films by Auguste and Louis Lumière and D. W. Griffith, who made films before there were "rules" about technique, stating "when technique is at its very beginnings, just like a child it knows no rules." His inspiration came from the invention of perspective in painting, when the viewer understands the existence of space outside the painting's edges. Godard wanted to explore the illusion of depth in a 3D image suggesting something "beyond the frame." Like the double exposure of a 3D image, the film contains two parallel narratives that repeat with two different couples. Godard was following Alfred Hitchcock's theory that "when you want something to be understood, you say it at least twice."

Bryant Frazer of Studio Daily wrote that Godard breaks the conventional "rules" of 3D in five ways: "he does not keep a clean frame" in his screen compositions, "he embraces low-quality cameras", "he gravitates toward deep focus" cinematography, "he rips the 3D image apart and then restores it in a single shot" and "he uses stereo to elevate the mundane" instead of spectacular subjects like superhero or fantasy films. Frazer said that Godard "wants to experiment with the technology, draw attention to it, test its boundaries, and see what happens when the image falls apart completely." Richard Brody of The New Yorker wrote that "rather than using 3-D as an effect to create a sensation of flight or to make a viewer feel like the target of propelled objects, Godard uses 3-D to emphasize the materiality, the physical properties, of the world at hand." Bordwell said that, other than "to awe us with special effects", 3D's purposes are typically to be realistic in its enhancement of the depth of objects and "advancing our understanding of the story", which is usually achieved with only one part of the screen in 3D while the rest is out of focus and in 2D. In Goodbye to Language Godard uses 3D in deep focus shots with images that allow the audience to scan the entire frame. Bordwell wrote that Godard's use of 3D "is aiming to make us perceive the world stripped of our conceptual constructs (language, plot, normal viewpoints, and so on)."

Brody wrote that Godard "treated 3-D as a device of independent filmmaking ... he opens the art form up to yet another, virtual dimension. His use of 3-D is itself the film's big idea." MacCabe wrote that Godard "uses [3D] to distance as well as engage" the audience instead of simply enhancing realism, which is influenced by Bertolt Brecht. Armond White wrote that Godard "uses the digital 3D fad to consider how men and women communicate ... and then, playfully, observes their dog's loyalty ... to demonstrate pure faith, pure curiosity, and his own imperviousness in an era when Reality and Digital Reality are confused." White believes that the film's use of 3D mocks the technique's supposed visual depth and instead uses it to examine the depth of human experience, such as "the dynamics of sexual, political, and artistic relations."

=== Social interpretations ===
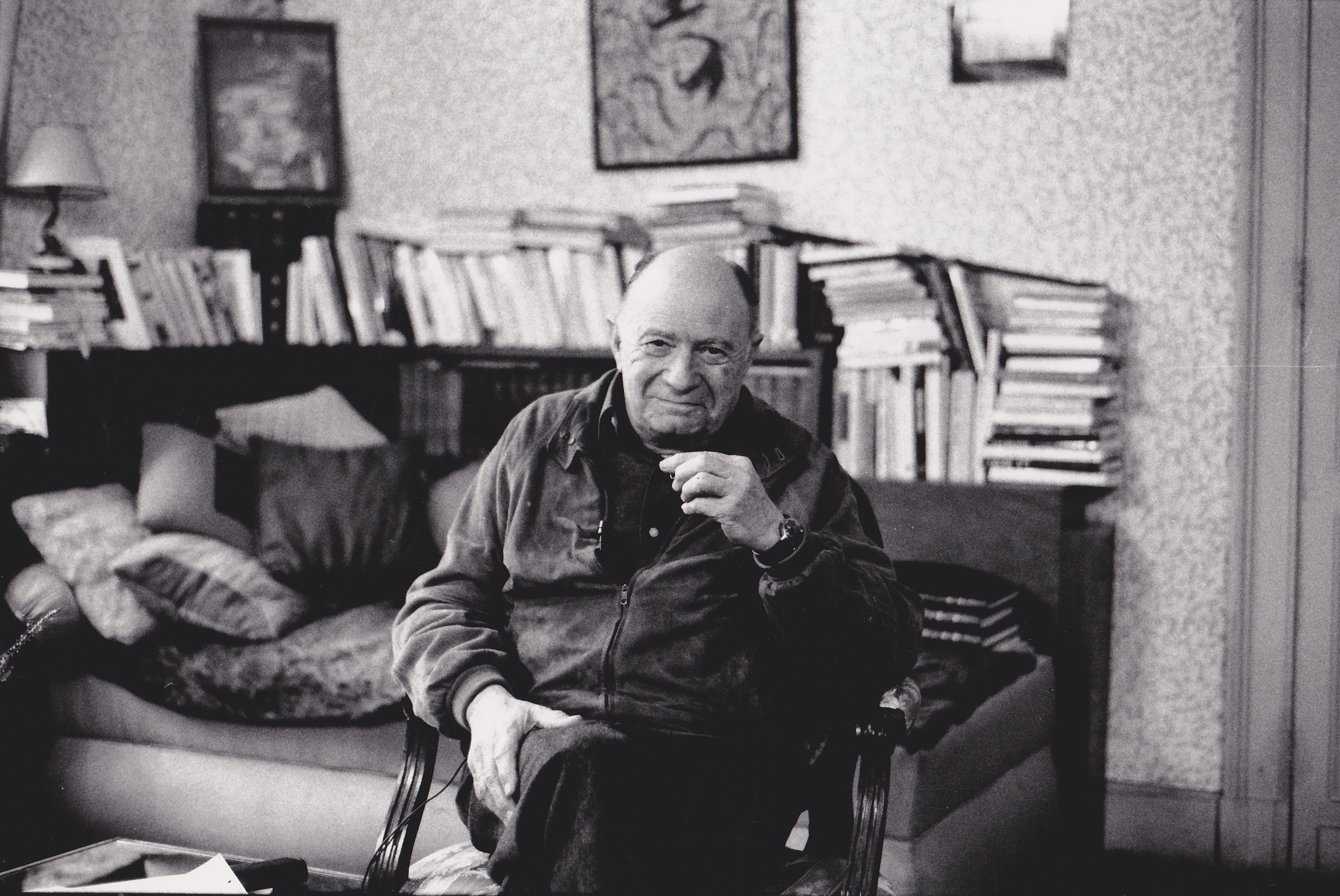
The works of philosopher Jacques Ellul and his predictions about technology are prominent in the film's themes.

Roxy Miéville appears with the couple, as well as with the unseen Godard and Anne-Marie Miéville at the end of the film. Godard and his long-term professional and romantic partner Miéville co-owned Roxy. During the film's production Godard often talked about Miéville. Olivier Séguret of Libération observed that most of the film was shot in places Godard shared with Miéville in their personal life and that the dialogue between the two couples could be based on conversations between them. When interviewed by NPR, Bordwell interpreted the shots of Roxy as Godard "trying to get people to look at the world in a kind of an unspoiled way ... There are hints throughout the film that animal consciousness is kind of closer to the world than we are, that language sets up a barrier or filter or screen between us and what's really there. And although the film is full of language, talk, printed text and so on, nevertheless I think there's a sense he wants the viewer to scrape away a lot of the ordinary conceptions we have about how we communicate and look at the world afresh." Godard said that it was partially true that he saw the world through Roxy's eyes and that Roxy "restores balance" to the couple when they are in conflict and represent "the commoners" while the couple represents "nobility" or "the clergy." MacCabe wrote that Roxy "offer[s] an image of acceptable sociality" in the film. In a scene with Roxy, a narrator talks about the Universal Declaration on Animal Welfare, which Brody calls "Godard's one rare glimmer of historical optimism. It's as if Roxy were the agent of reconciliation—not of one merely lover to another but of Godard to the present day, to the rising generation."

Jonathan Romney expressed his difficulty in jotting down each reference while watching the film, writing that "propositions, allusions, sounds, images rush on in wave after wave, each building a new layer on top of—or violently erasing—what's immediately gone before. Trying to make any sense of it all, even in the most rudimentary or provisional way, is an anguish-inducing process" and that "you might be closer to understanding a Godard film if you'd read everything the director had read—but then you'd also have to have read it all in exactly the same way that he had read it, making the same connections." Ted Fendt wrote that "knowing the original sources of Godard's work often seems to me to be about as useful to 'unlocking' the films and videos as reading a heavily footnoted copy of The Waste Land."

Brody has observed that many of the references have been used by Godard in his previous film, making them "self-referential and retrospective touches." He also relates the visual references to the political themes of the film and compares the archival footage of Nazi Germany and the Soviet Union in the first part as parallel to the scenes from classic films on TV screens in the second part. The historical footage "seem[s] to persist as an outsized influence on today's politics, stories, and even identities" while the Hollywood movies compel modern film characters to "live in the light of the history of cinema, of the great age of Hollywood and the classic European cinema that also overarches and overawes the moderns." One technique Godard uses is having narrative scenes suddenly cut to "a digression, a collage of found footage, intertitles, or other material that seems triggered by something mentioned in the scene." Bordwell has called this an "associational form" often used in essay films, similar to novelist John Dos Passos' use of newspaper stories in his USA trilogy.

The film examines many historical events of the 20th century, particularly the rise of Hitler, communism and technology. Godard quotes lengthy passages from Jacques Ellul's 1945 essay "Victoire d'Hitler?", in which Ellul wrote, "everything Hitler said, he accomplished" and examined the dangers of the individual giving absolute power to the State. Ellul concluded, "everything that the State conquers as a power, it never loses. And that's Hitler's second victory." Eric Kohn of Indiewire wrote that showing Ellul's essay being read off of a smartphone "portrays the information age as the dying breath of consciousness before intellectual thought becomes homogenized by digital advancements" and that the film "suggests humankind has grown limited by devices that tell us everything we think we need to know."

There are also brief references to Africa, such as Joceyln Benoist's quote: "Sir, is it possible to produce a concept about Africa?" Brody said this reference "suggests the poverty of modern philosophy—and of modern art—in addressing political crises that were wrongly relegated to the margins of the 20th century and that have recently come to the fore." White believes that the film's reference to Frankenstein is a "prophesy of the 21st century compulsion to debase ourselves into monsters and zombies—confused by the need to make sense of topical complexities. Our guilt-ridden age's retreat into a technology that pretends realism rather than moral imagination is pathetic." Brody interpreted the reference as a suggestion "that the book itself is an act of political metaphor and historical image creation." MacCabe wrote that the film is Godard's most intense example of the director's increasing "extreme Calvinism", writing that "it is difficult not to feel that the film is, among other things, the work of an old Protestant pastor fulminating against the sins of the world and the irredeemable fallenness of man."
