= Thierry Frémaux =

French film critic

Thierry Fremaux
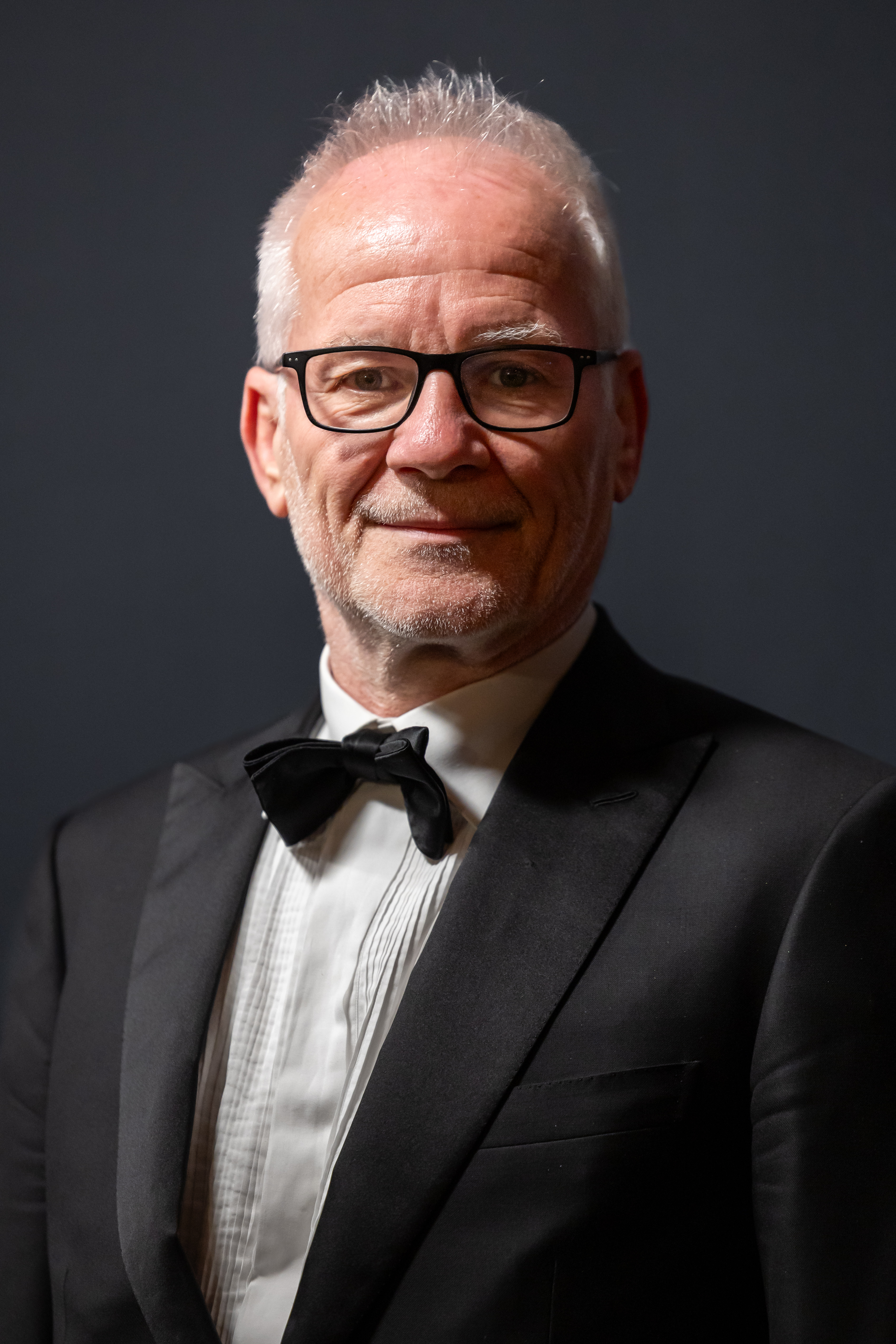
- Fremaux in 2025
- Born: 29 May 1960 (age 66); Tullins, Isère, France
- Occupation: Film critic

Thierry Frémaux (French: [tjɛ.ʁi fʁe.mo]; born 29 May 1960) is the director of the Institut Lumière and of the Lumière Film Festival, and the General Delegate of the Cannes Film Festival.

== Education and career ==
Frémaux was born in Tullins, Isère. After a stint in Paris, the Frémaux family returned to southeastern France around 1970, settling in the Lyonnais suburb of Caluire-et-Cuire before moving to Les Minguettes in Vénissieux. Frémaux's father, an EDF engineer and a staunch leftist with connections to the Unified Socialist Party (PSU), deliberately chose to settle the family in the working-class district.

Frémaux was introduced to cinema at a young age by his father, who ran a film club. While studying social history at University Lyon 2, he co-founded the community radio station Radio Canut and worked as a judo instructor. He obtained his diplôme d'études approfondies with a thesis on the early history of the film magazine Positif.

In 1982, Frémaux began volunteering for the fledgling Institut Lumière after approaching its president, filmmaker Bertrand Tavernier, and became a formal employee a year later. In 1995, he was appointed artistic director, and organised the centenary celebration of cinema along with Tavernier.

After declining the directorship of Cinémathèque française, Frémaux accepted Gilles Jacob's offer to serve as Artistic Delegate of the Cannes Film Festival on the condition that he retained his position at the Institut Lumière. His tenure formally began in 2001. In 2007, he was promoted to General Delegate.

In 2009, Frémaux launched a new festival, the Lumière Festival, organised by the Institut Lumière.

In 2017, Frémaux directed the feature film Lumière! l'aventure commence, a collection of restored early films by Auguste and Louis Lumière.

== Bibliography ==
- Sélection officielle (2017, Grasset; ISBN 978-2-2468-6371-7) (English translation: Official Selection)

== Filmography ==
- 2017 – Lumière! The Adventure of Cinema Begins
- 2024 – Lumiere! The Adventure Continues

== See also ==
- Letter in Motion to Gilles Jacob and Thierry Frémaux
