= Letter in Motion to Gilles Jacob and Thierry Frémaux =

Letter in Motion to Gilles Jacob and Thierry Fremaux
- Directed by: Jean-Luc Godard
- Written by: Jean-Luc Godard
- Release date: May 21, 2014 (2014 Cannes Film Festival)
- Running time: 9 minutes
- Countries: France; Switzerland
- Language: French

Letter in Motion to Gilles Jacob and Thierry Frémaux (French: Lettre filmée de Jean-Luc Godard à Gilles Jacob et Thierry Frémaux; a.k.a. Khan Khanne) is a 2014 short film directed by Jean-Luc Godard.

It was made as a personal video letter to retiring festival president Gilles Jacob and artistic director Thierry Frémaux, explaining Godard's absence from the 2014 Cannes Film Festival for the premiere of his feature film Goodbye to Language. Jacob later released the film on the internet.

In the film, Godard's narration explains his personal state of mind as an artist and the current "path" that he is on. It includes footage from Godard's films Germany Year 90 Nine Zero and King Lear, quotes by Jacques Prévert and Hannah Arendt, and black and white still photos of Jacques Rivette and François Truffaut, as Godard references the autumn and says that he is going "where the wind blows me." In King Lear, Godard filmed a similar scene that included black and white still photos of film directors like Rivette and Truffaut, but Godard mocked the then-recently deceased Truffaut in that film.
