= A Place on Earth =

A Place on Earth may refer to:

- A Place on Earth (2001 film), a Russian film
- A Place on Earth (2013 film), a French / Belgian drama film
- A Place on Earth: The Greatest Hits, 1999 album by Belinda Carlisle
- A Place on Earth (novel), by Wendell Berry

== See also ==
- Place on Earth, a Danish musician trio
