= 2014 National Society of Film Critics Awards =

Annual US film awards ceremony

49th NSFC Awards

January 3, 2015

Best Film:
Goodbye to Language

The 49th National Society of Film Critics Awards, given on 3 January 2015, honored the best in film for 2014.

== Winners ==
Winners are listed in boldface along with the runner-up positions and counts from the final round:

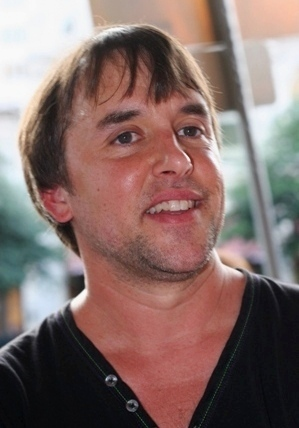
Richard Linklater, Best Director winner

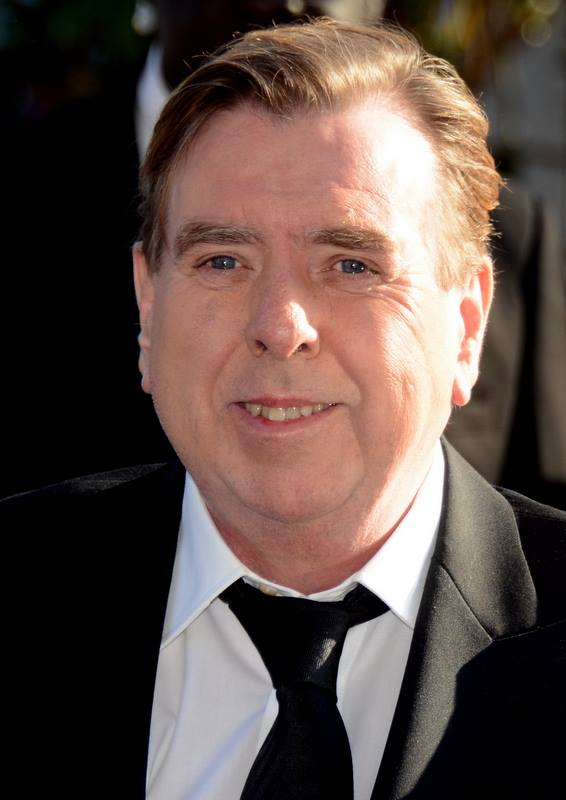
Timothy Spall, Best Actor winner

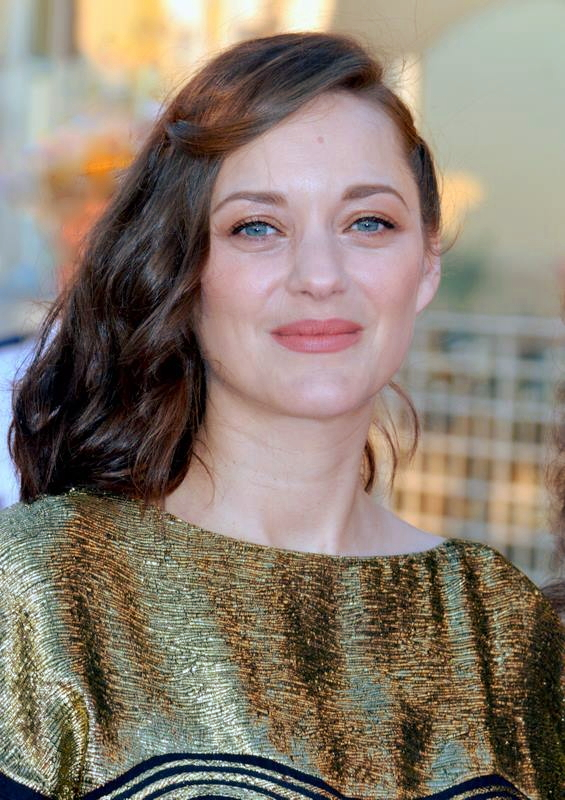
Marion Cotillard, Best Actress winner

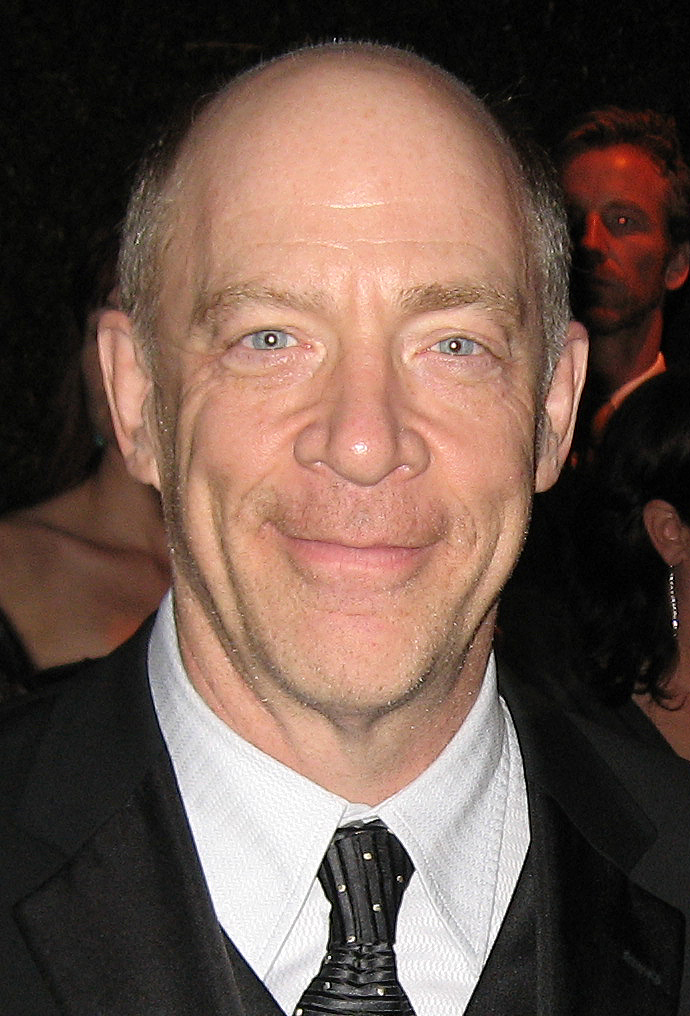
J. K. Simmons, Best Supporting Actor winner

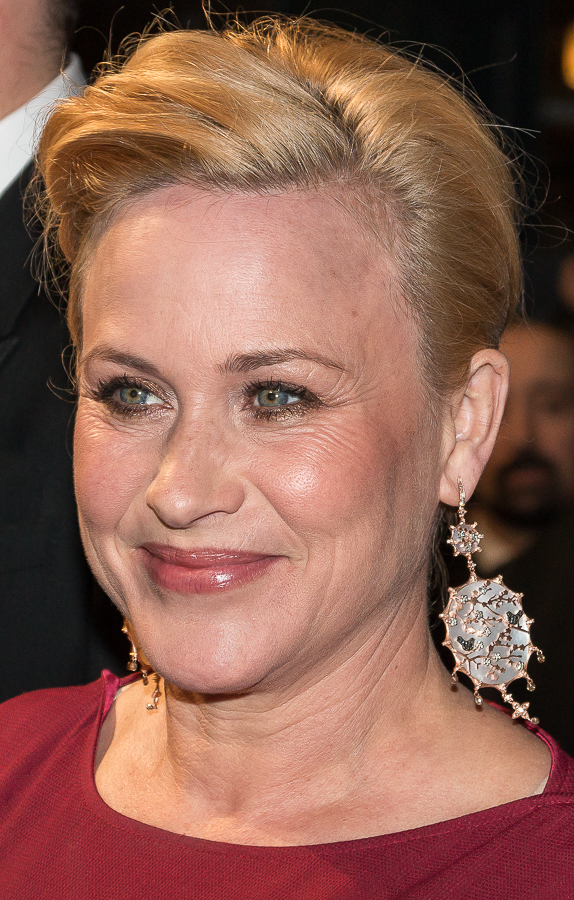
Patricia Arquette, Best Supporting Actress winner

=== Best Picture ===
1. **Goodbye to Language** (25)
2. Boyhood (24)
3. Birdman (10)
4. Mr. Turner (10)

=== Best Director ===
1. **Richard Linklater – Boyhood** (36)
2. Jean-Luc Godard – Goodbye to Language (17)
3. Mike Leigh – Mr. Turner (12)

=== Best Actor ===
1. **Timothy Spall – Mr. Turner** (31)
2. Tom Hardy – Locke (10)
3. Joaquin Phoenix – Inherent Vice (9)
4. Ralph Fiennes – The Grand Budapest Hotel (9)

=== Best Actress ===
1. **Marion Cotillard – The Immigrant and Two Days, One Night** (80)
2. Julianne Moore – Still Alice (35)
3. Scarlett Johansson – Lucy and Under the Skin (21)

=== Best Supporting Actor ===
1. **J. K. Simmons – Whiplash** (24)
2. Mark Ruffalo – Foxcatcher (21)
3. Edward Norton – Birdman (16)

=== Best Supporting Actress ===
1. **Patricia Arquette – Boyhood** (26)
2. Agata Kulesza – Ida (18)
3. Rene Russo – Nightcrawler (9)

=== Best Screenplay ===
1. **Wes Anderson – The Grand Budapest Hotel** (24)
2. Paul Thomas Anderson – Inherent Vice (15)
3. Alejandro G. Iñárritu, Nicolás Giacobone, Alexander Dinelaris Jr., and Armando Bo – Birdman (15)

=== Best Cinematography ===
1. **Dick Pope – Mr. Turner** (33)
2. Darius Khondji – The Immigrant (27)
3. Fabrice Aragno – Goodbye to Language (9)

=== Best Non-Fiction Film ===
1. **Citizenfour – Laura Poitras** (56)
2. National Gallery – Frederick Wiseman (19)
3. The Overnighters – Jesse Moss (17)

=== Film Heritage Awards ===
The Film Heritage Awards were presented for the restorations of classical work of artists in field of film and music:

1. To Ron Magliozzi, associate curator, and Peter Williamson, film conservation manager, of the Museum of Modern Art, for identifying and assembling the earliest surviving footage of what would have been the feature film to star a black cast, the 1913 Lime Kiln Field Day starring Bert Williams.
2. To Ron Hutchison, co-founder and director of The Vitaphone Project, which since 1991 has collected and restored countless original soundtrack discs for early sound short films and features, including the recent Warner Bros. restoration of William A. Seiter's 1929 Why Be Good?

=== Dedication ===
As per tradition, ceremony was dedicated to the memory of two distinguished members of the Society who died in the previous year; in 2014 the honorees were Jay Carr and Charles Champlin.
