= Joseph Bonnaire =

French rose breeder (1842–1910)

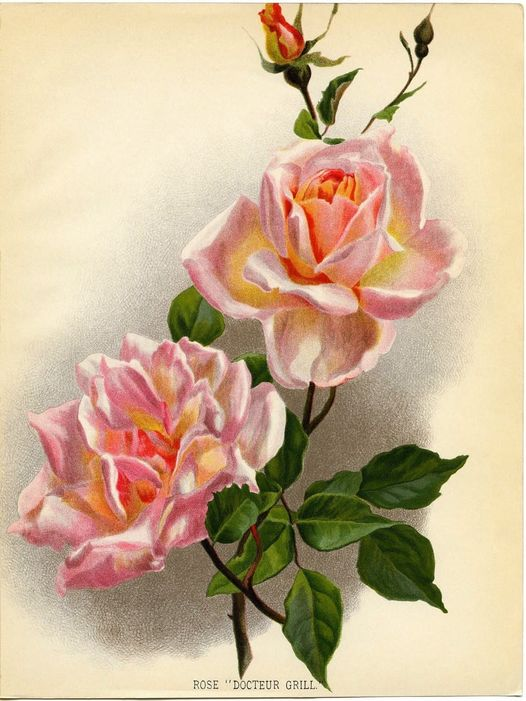
Rosa 'Dr. Grill' (1884), in The Garden by Henry Moon (1890)

Joseph Bonnnaire (9 August 1842 – 4 August 1910) was a French rose breeder who is recognized for his work in Lyon, France, in the development of Hybrid tea roses and Tea roses.

== Life ==
Bonnnaire was born in Saint-Chef on 9 August 1842. He opened his own nursery in 1878 in Monplaisir, at this time a suburb of Lyon.

He especially creates varieties with pastel and refined tones. His rose "Madame Joseph Bonnaire" (1891), dedicated to his wife, is still present in contemporary international catalogs.

Lyon was then at the height of its fame and had many rose growers who exported all over Europe. Bonnaire caused a sensation with new tea hybrids which were beginning to dethrone the remontant hybrids, and always with tea roses, such as 'Souvenir de Victor Hugo', a variety which was recognized at the Dresden exhibition as the most beautiful of all novelties. He especially created varieties with refined pastel tones.

Among the forty of his creations, we can distinguish:

- "Souvenir de Victor Hugo" (1884)
- "Dr. Grill" (1884)
- "Madame Ernest Piard" (1887)
- "Mademoiselle Jeanne Guillaumez" (1889)
- "Souvenir d'Auguste Legros" (1889)
- "Elisa Fugier" (1890)
- "Madame Joseph Bonnaire" (1891)
- "Mademoiselle Joséphine Marot" (1894)

Bonnaire died in Lyon on 4 August 1910.

== Bibliography ==
- Nathalie Ferrand, Les Rosiéristes de la région lyonnaise : élaboration des variétés, études des marchés (1873-1939)
