= Place Ambroise-Courtois =

Pedestrian square in Monplaisir district, Lyon, France

Coordinates: 45.7447°N 4.8713°E

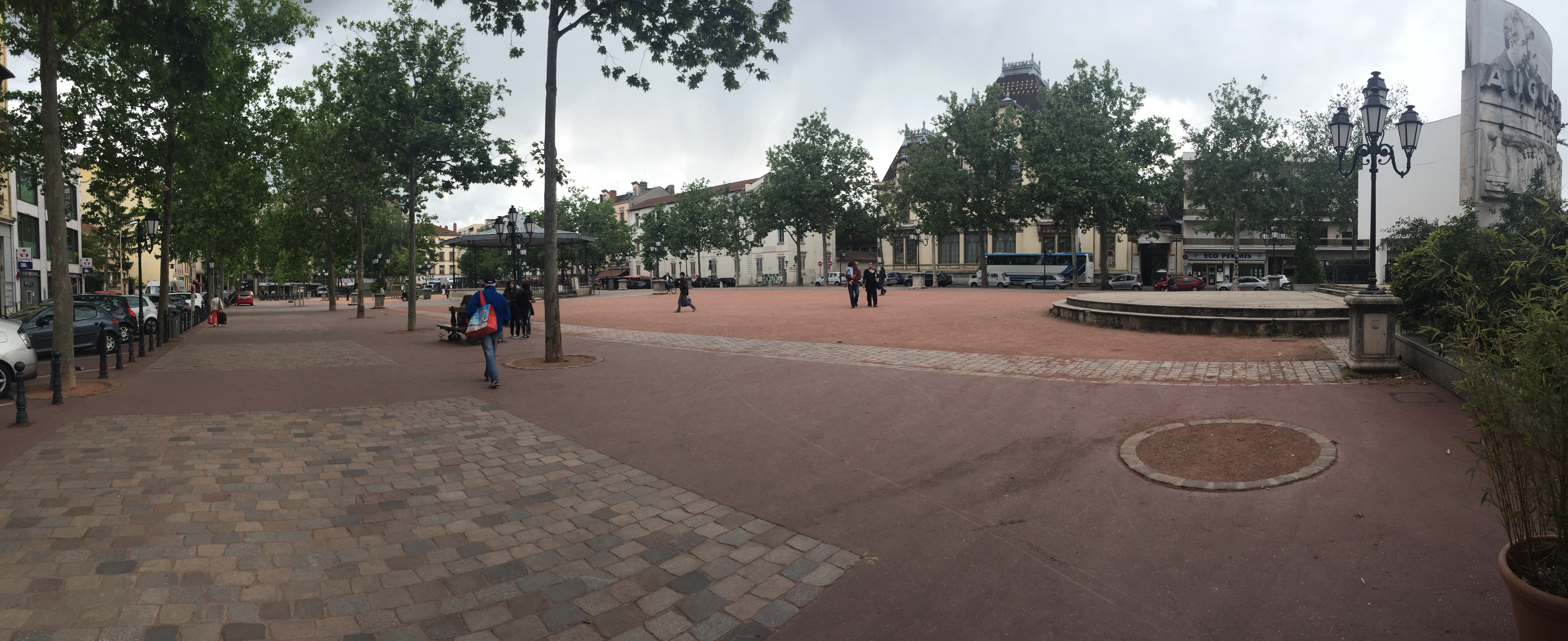
Place Ambroise-Courtois. The monument to the Lumière brothers can be seen on the far right.

The Place Ambroise-Courtois is a square in the neighborhood of Monplaisir in the 8th arrondissement of Lyon. It was named after Ambroise Courtois, a city councillor, on 30 October 1944, months after Courtois was assassinated by the Milice française. It had been previously named the Place de Monplaisir. The square is bordered by the Avenue des Frères-Lumière to the south and the Cours Albert-Thomas to the north.

== Buildings and monuments ==
- At the north end of the square is a monument to Auguste and Louis Lumière, who were the inventors of the cinematograph and lived in a villa adjacent to the square.
- The Institut Lumière, located at the west end of the square, is the former home of the Lumière brothers.
- There is a bust of Ambroise Courtois at the south end of the square.
- There is a bandstand in the middle of the square.
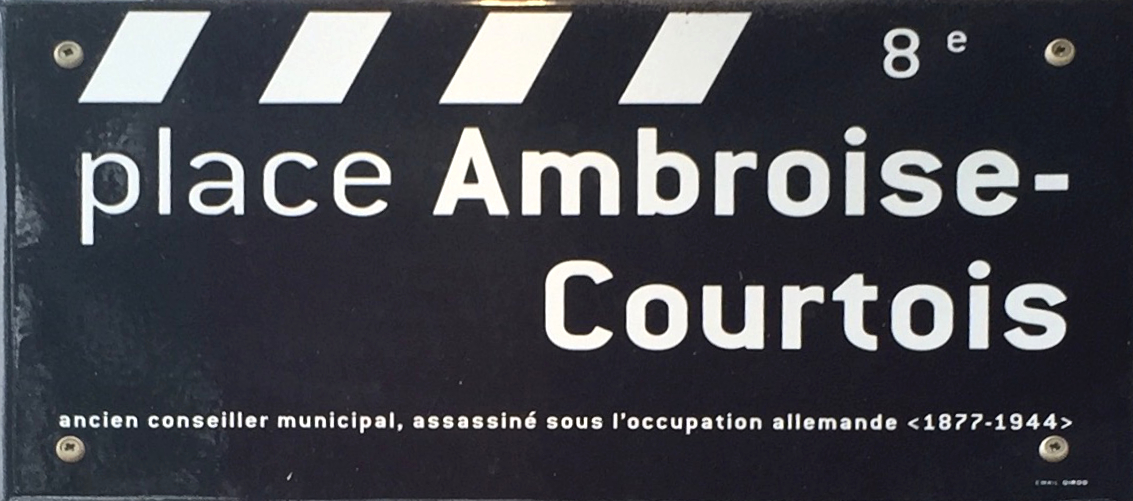
The street sign for the square

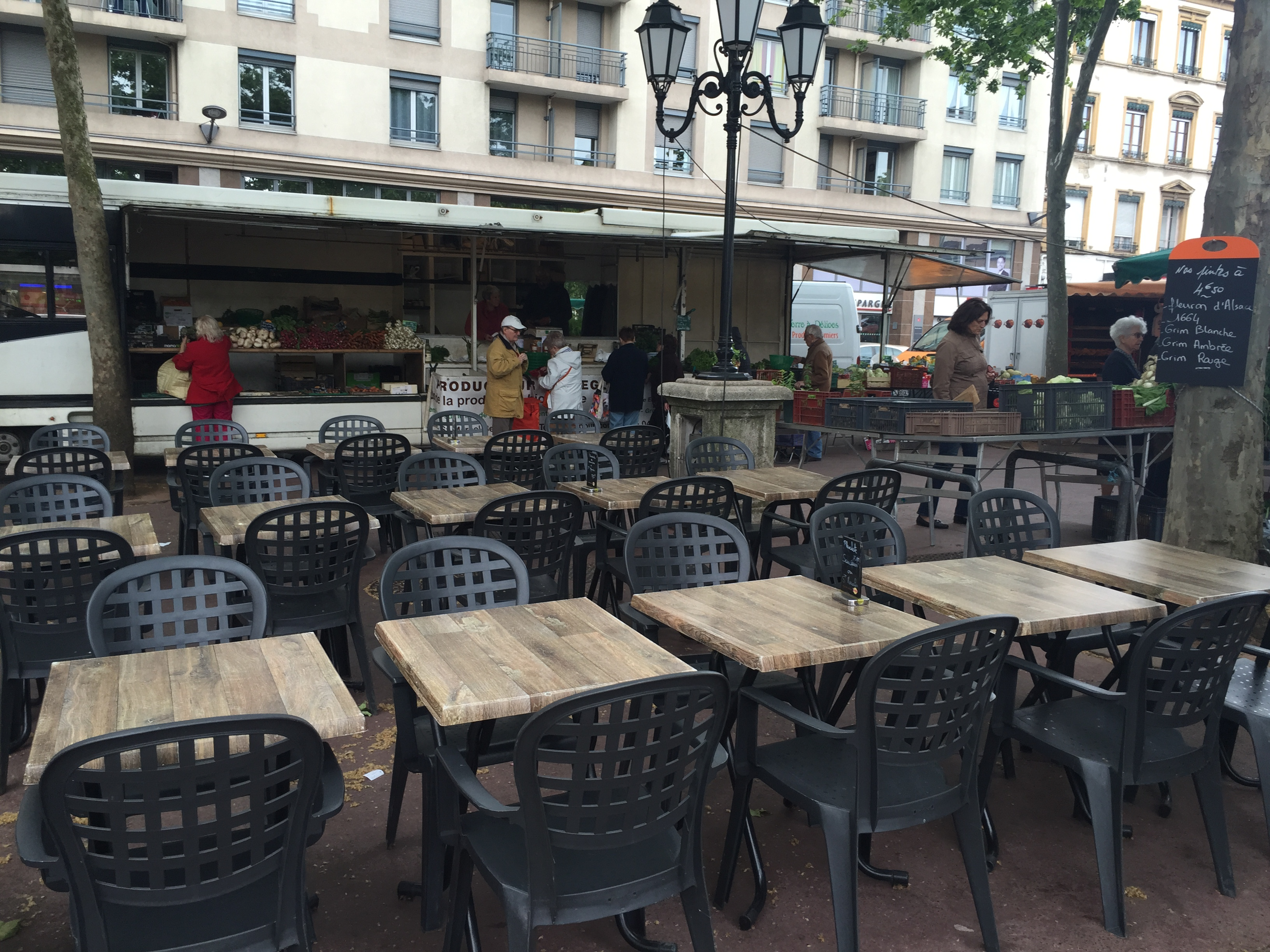
Night market at the Place Ambroise-Courtois

== See also ==
- List of streets and squares in Lyon
