= Institut Lumière =

Museum in France

Coordinates: 45°44′42.76″N 4°52′13.47″E

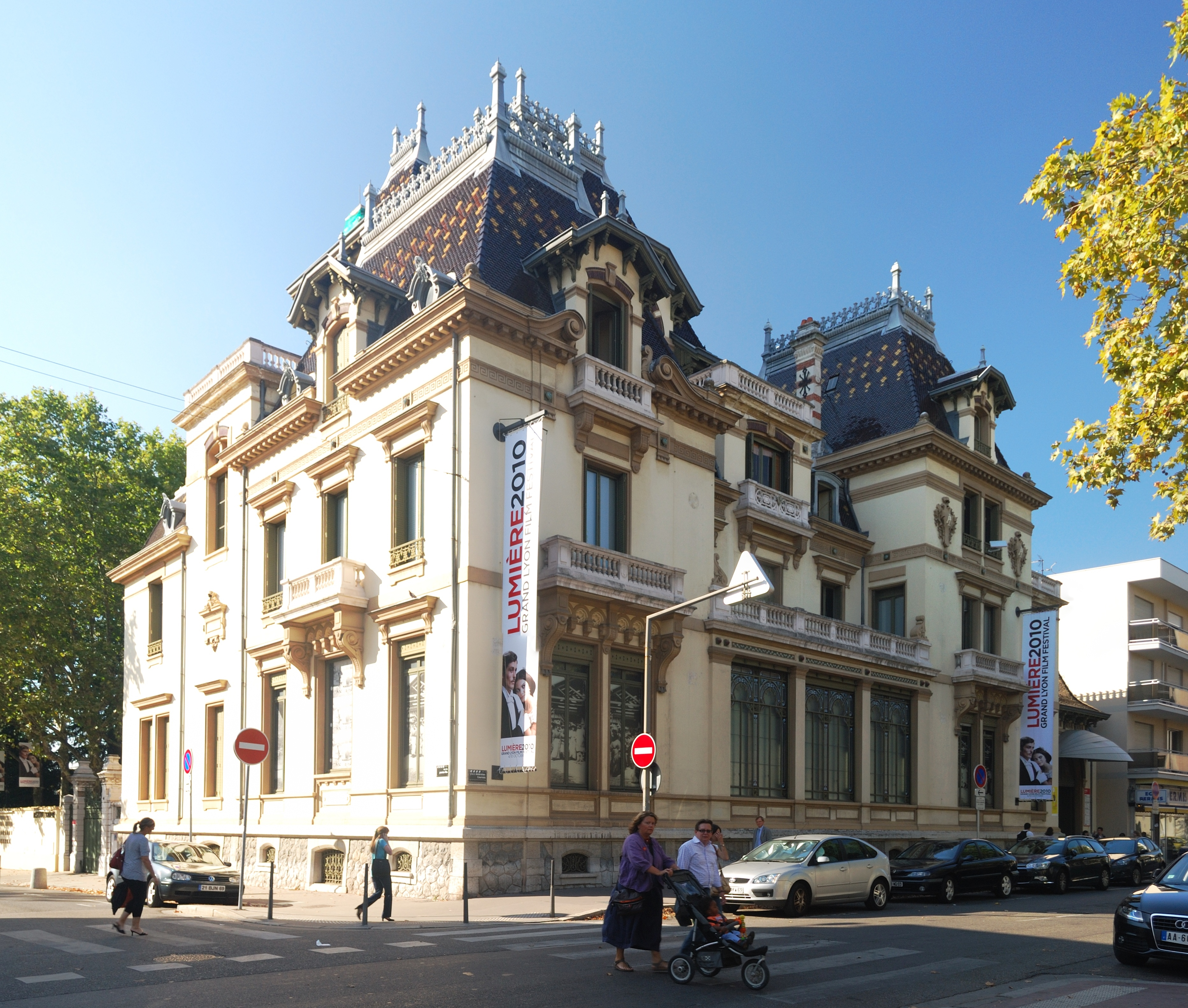
The Institut Lumière in Lyon

The Institut Lumière (French: [ɛ̃s.ti.ty ly.mjɛːʁ]; "Lumière Institute") is a French organisation, based in Lyon, for the promotion and preservation of aspects of French film making. The Institut Lumière is a museum that honours the contribution to filmmaking by Auguste and Louis Lumière, inventors of the cinématographe and fathers of the cinema.

It was founded in 1982 by Bernard Chardère and Maurice Trarieux-Lumière, the grandson of Louis Lumière. Bertrand Tavernier was its president and Thierry Frémaux is its director. The museum is located within the house of the Lumière family, in the Monplaisir quarter of Lyon. The film La Sortie de l'usine Lumière à Lyon, one of the earliest motion pictures ever made, was shot in the immediate vicinity of the Institut.

The rehabilitation of the former Lumière factories was confided to the architect Pierre Colboc and the Chief architect of historic monuments Didier Repellin, associated with the agency dUCKS Scéno for the scenography of the cinema and the outer spaces.

== Gallery ==
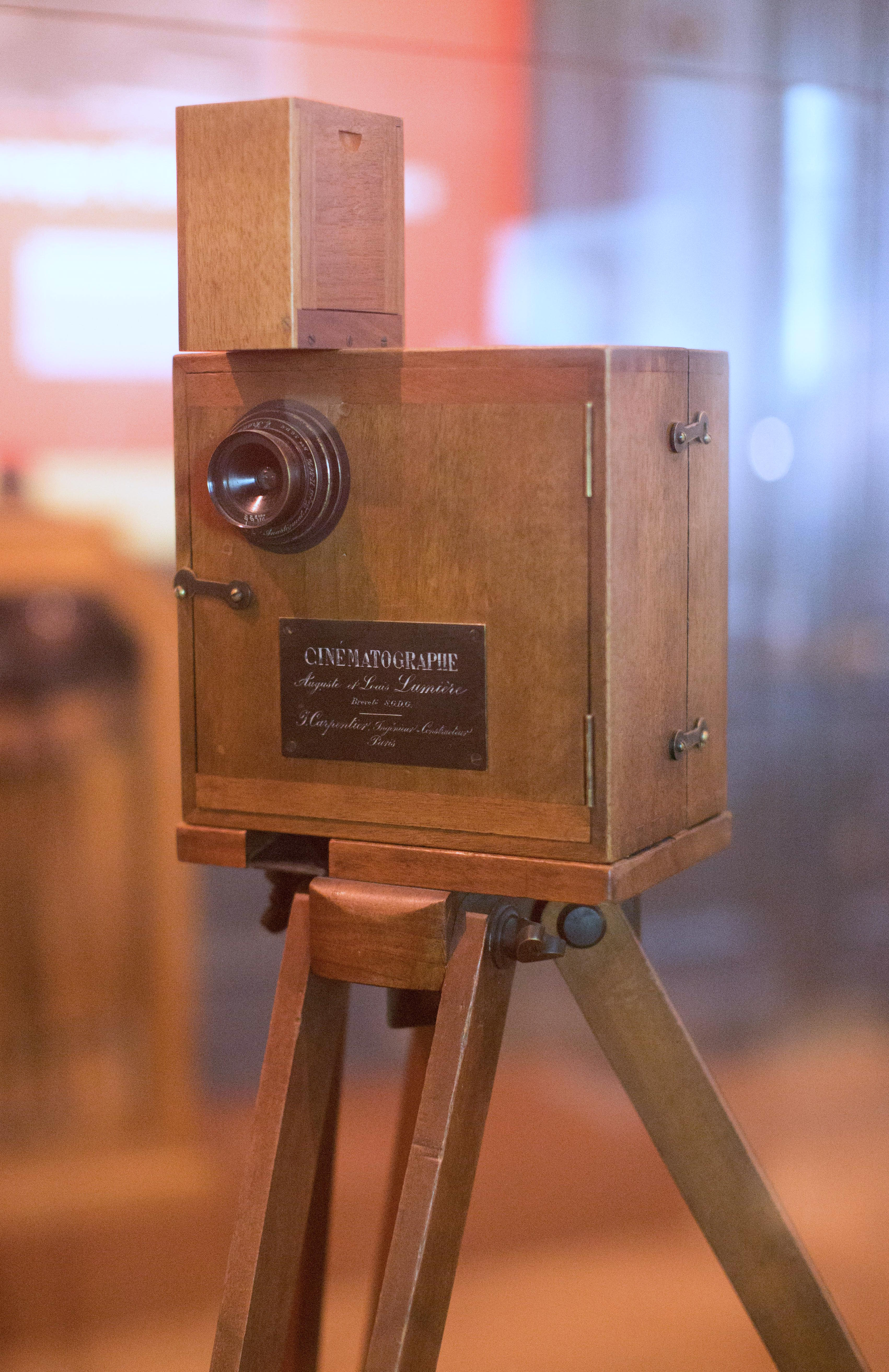

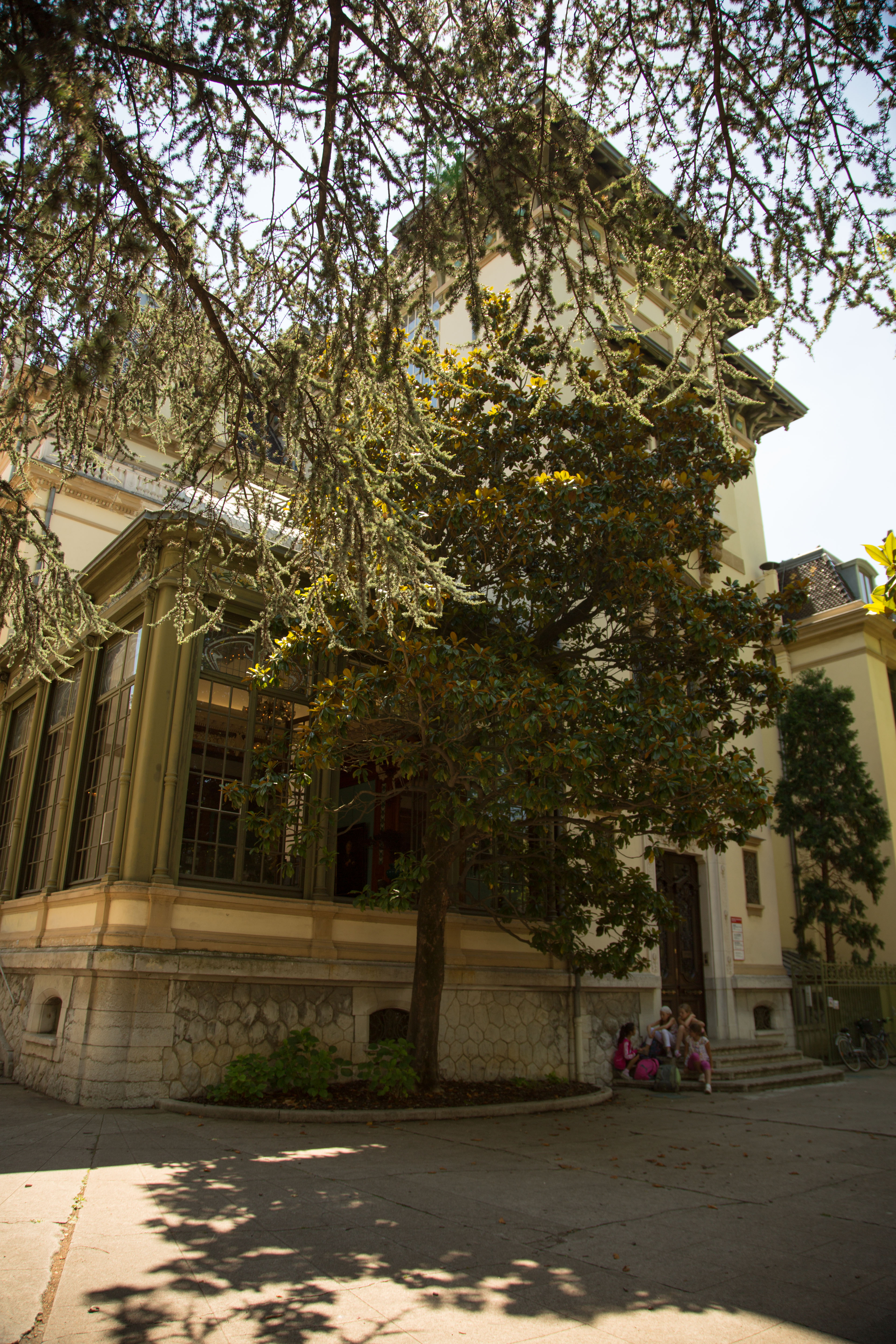

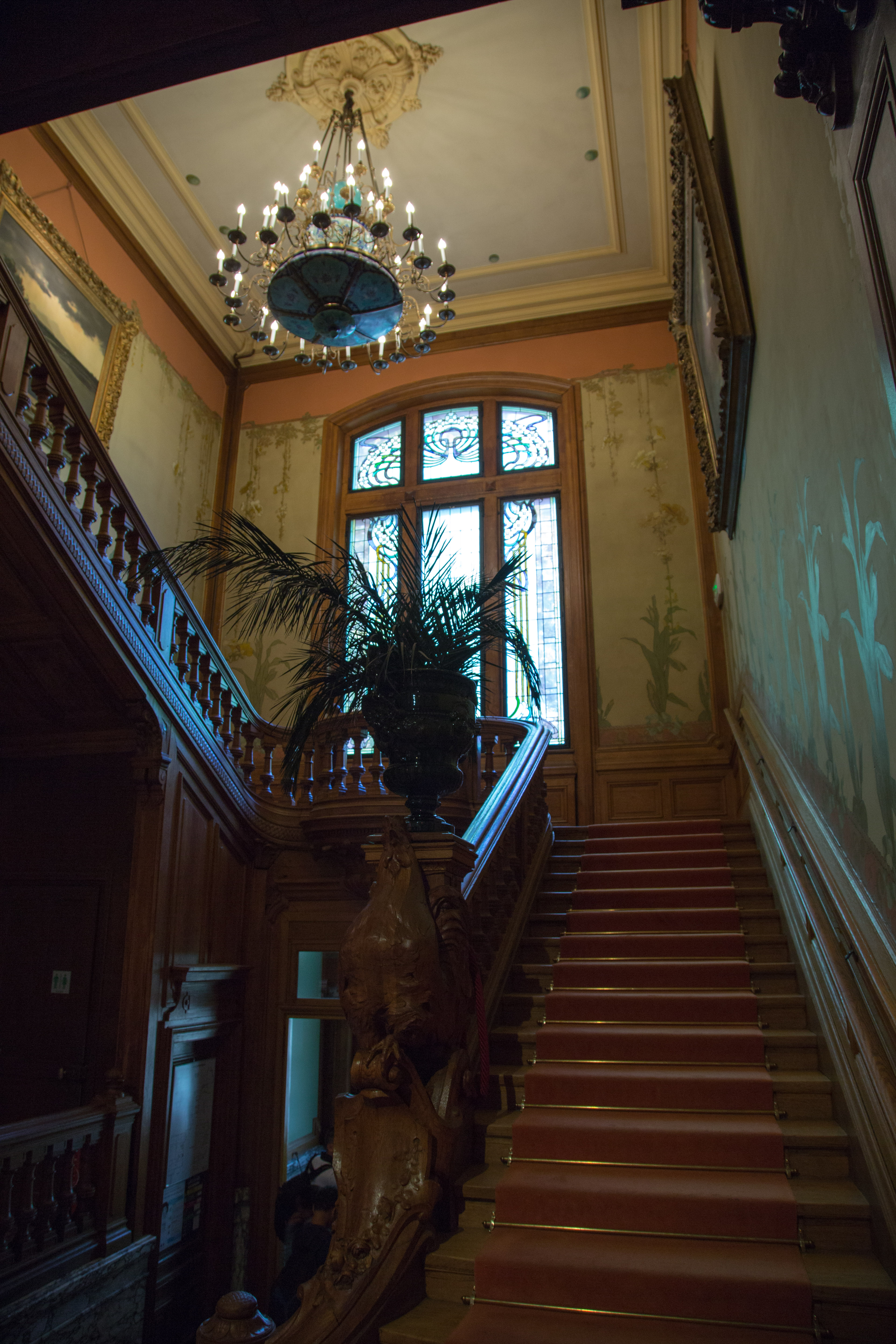

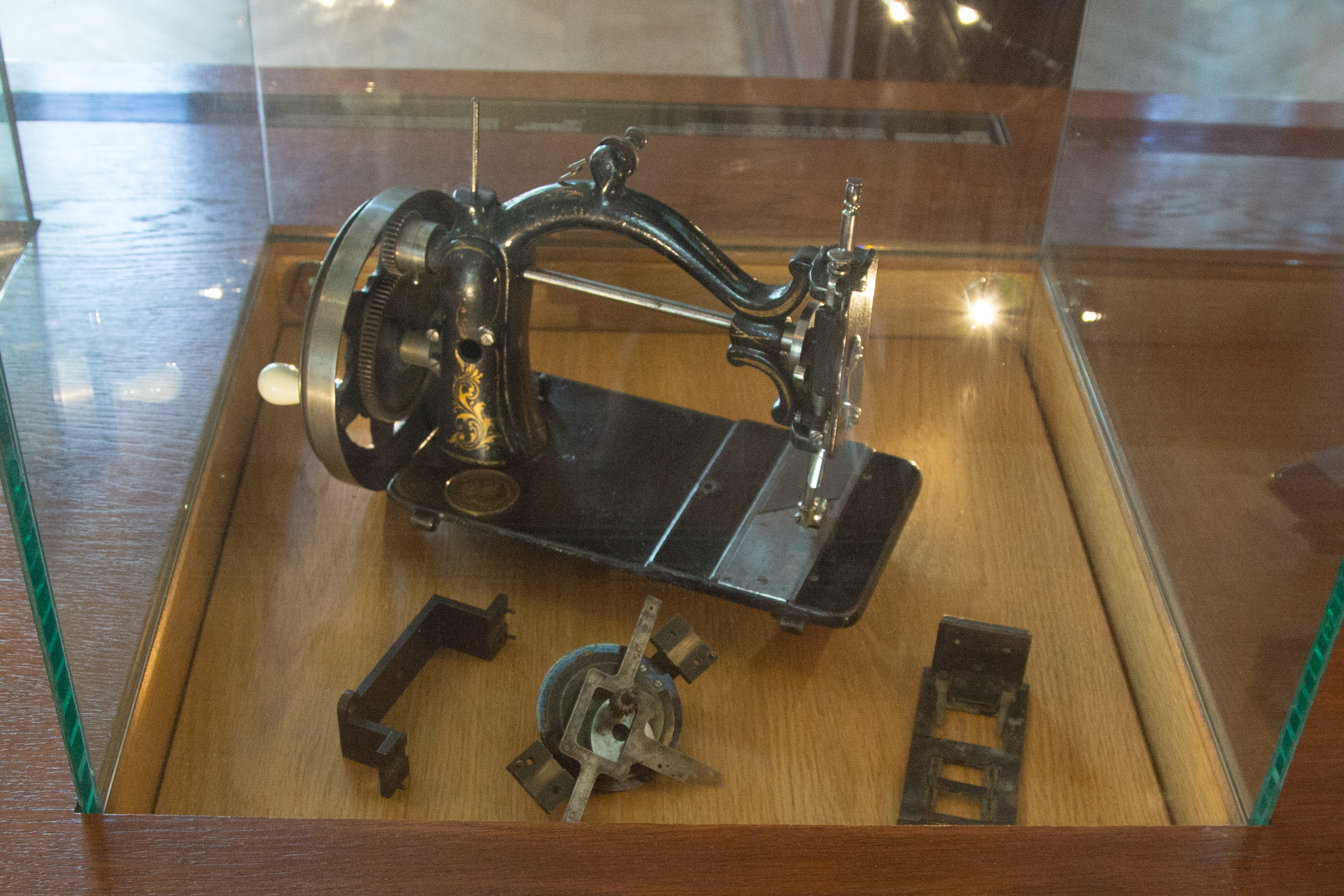

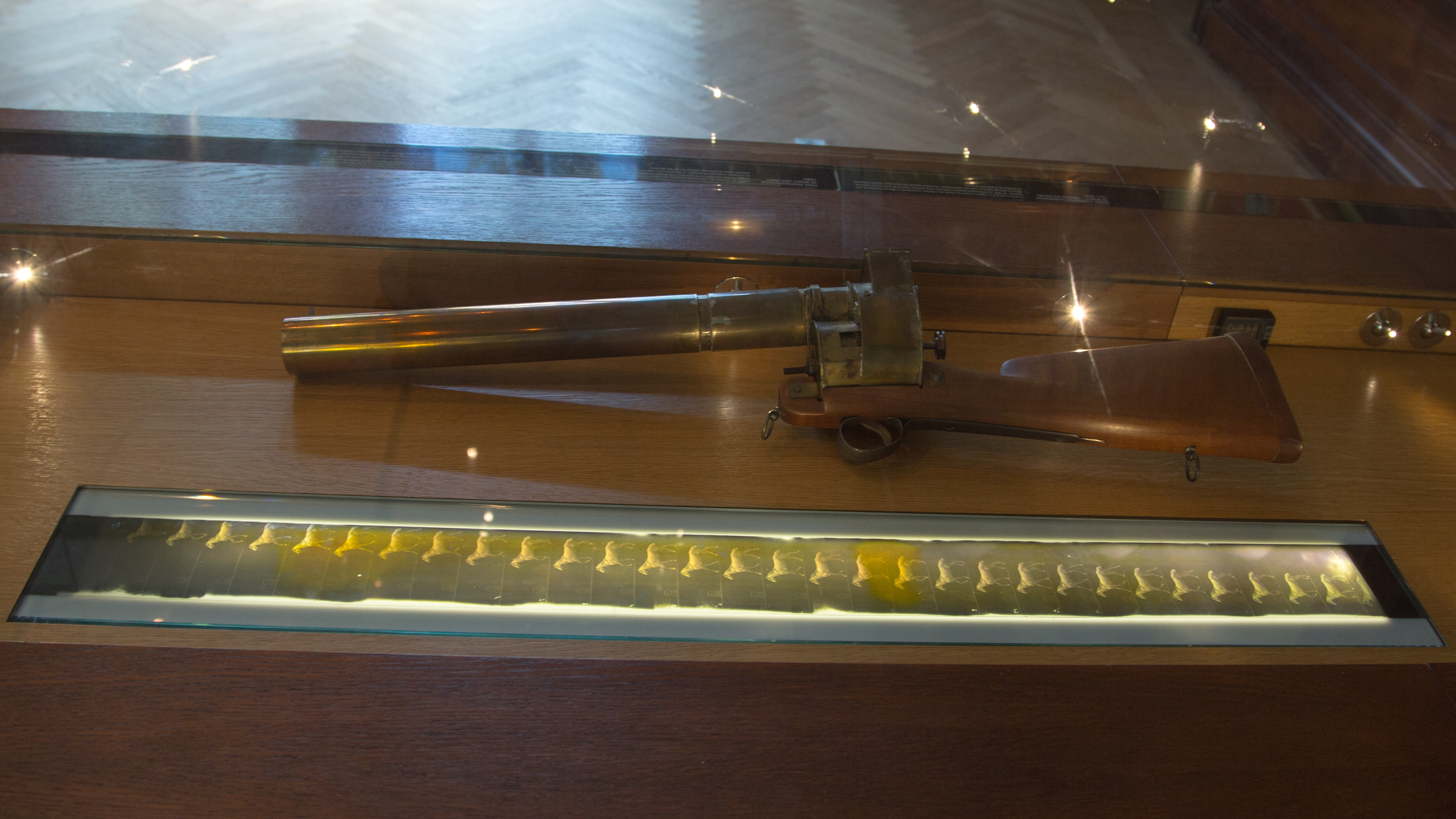

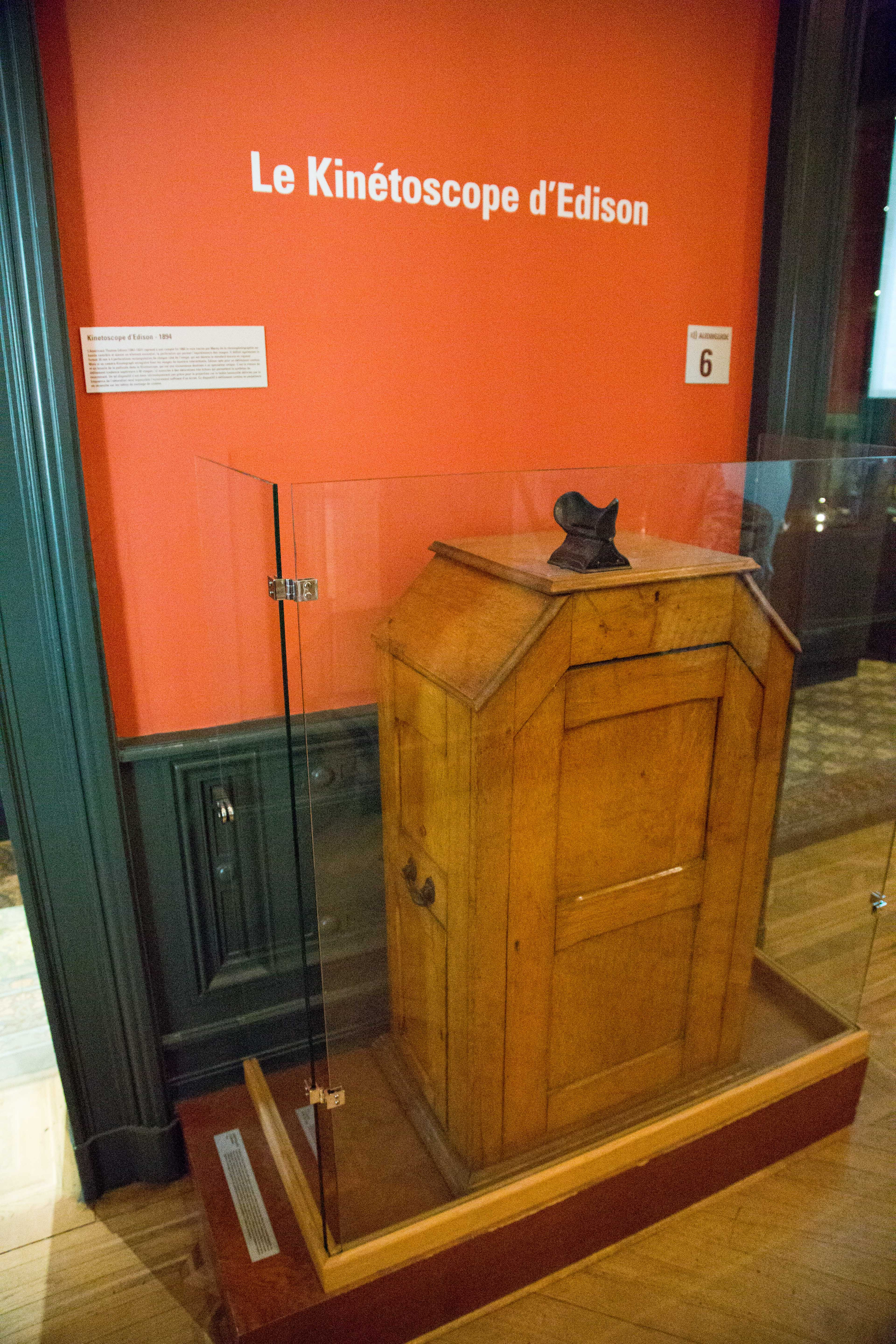

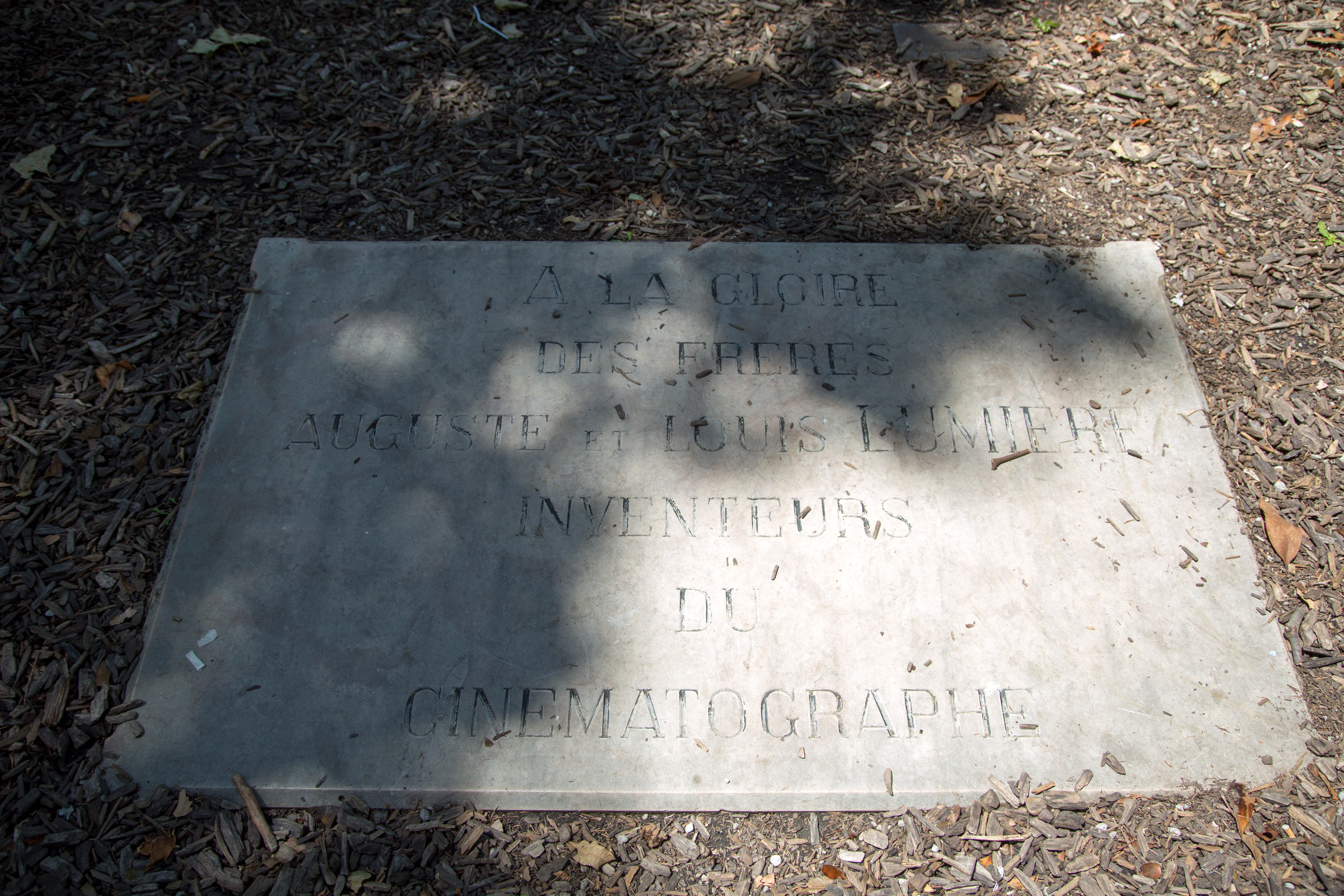

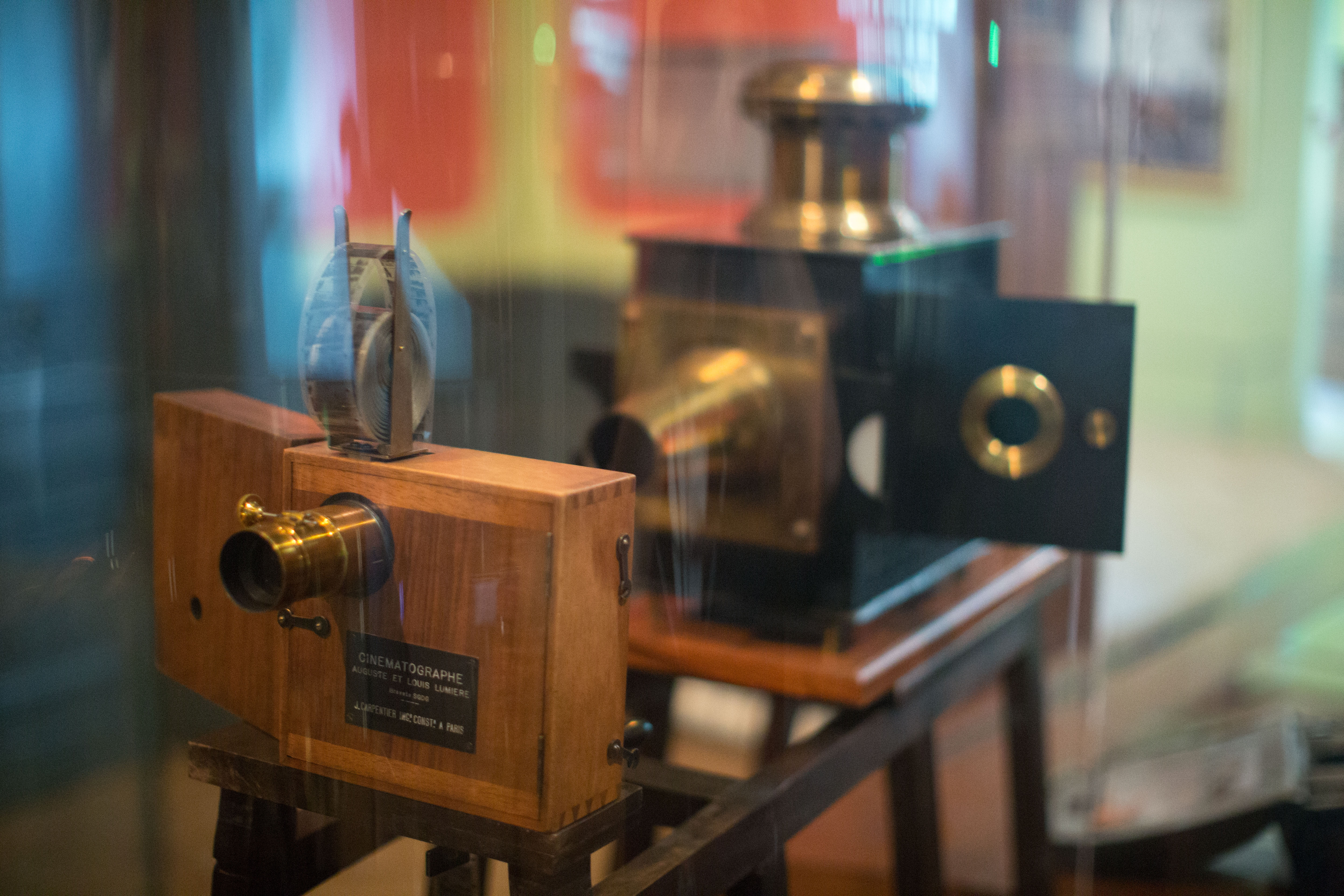

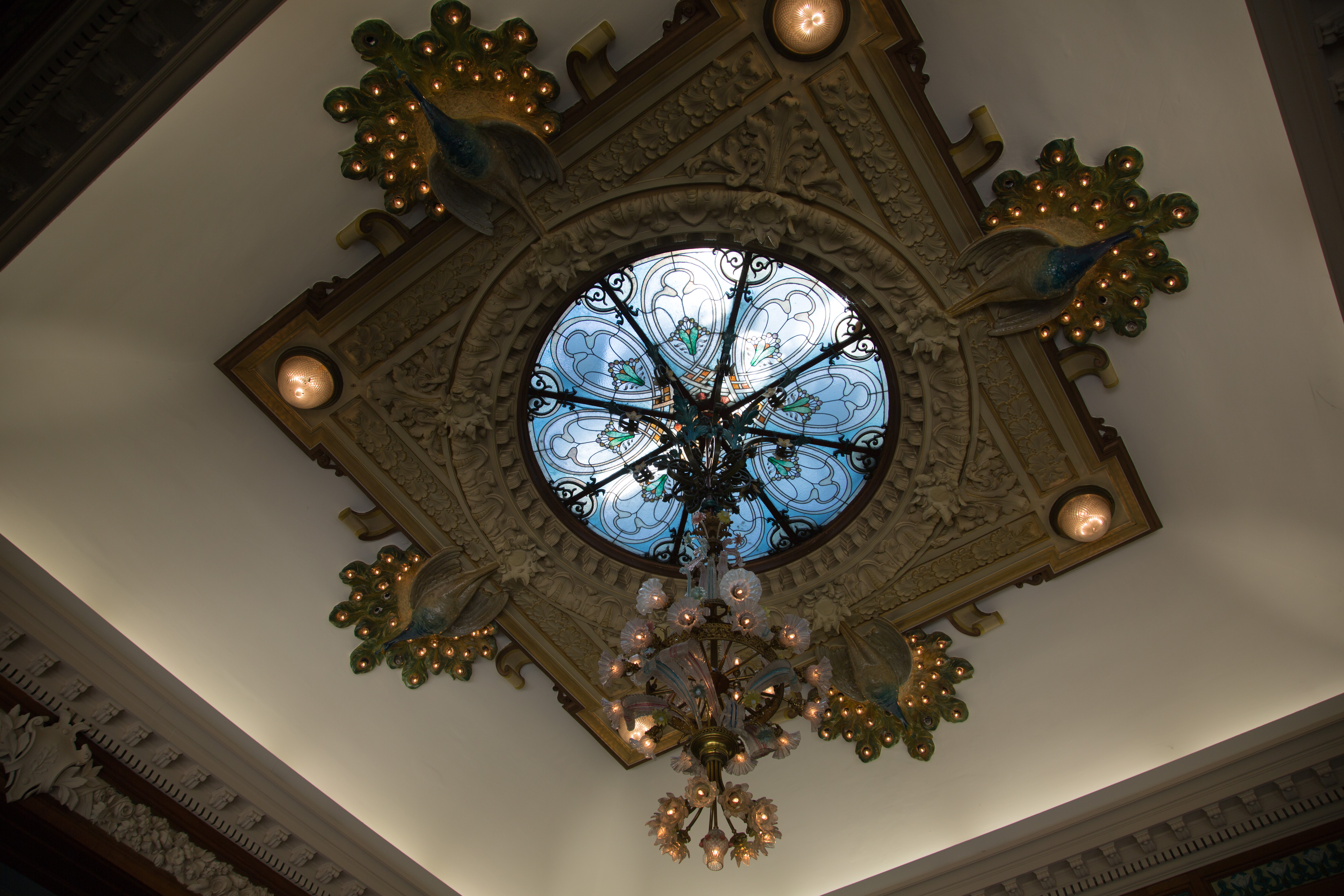

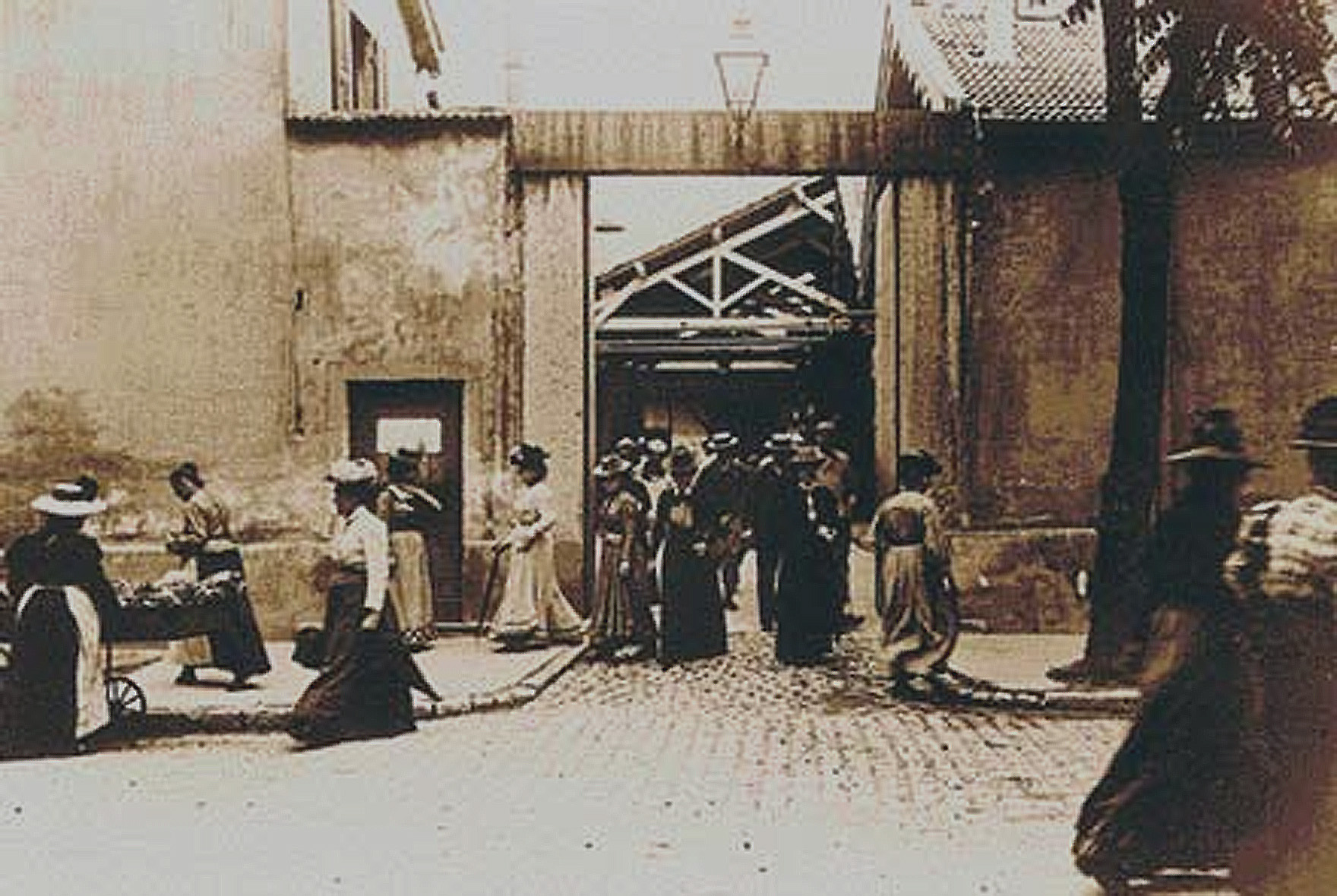

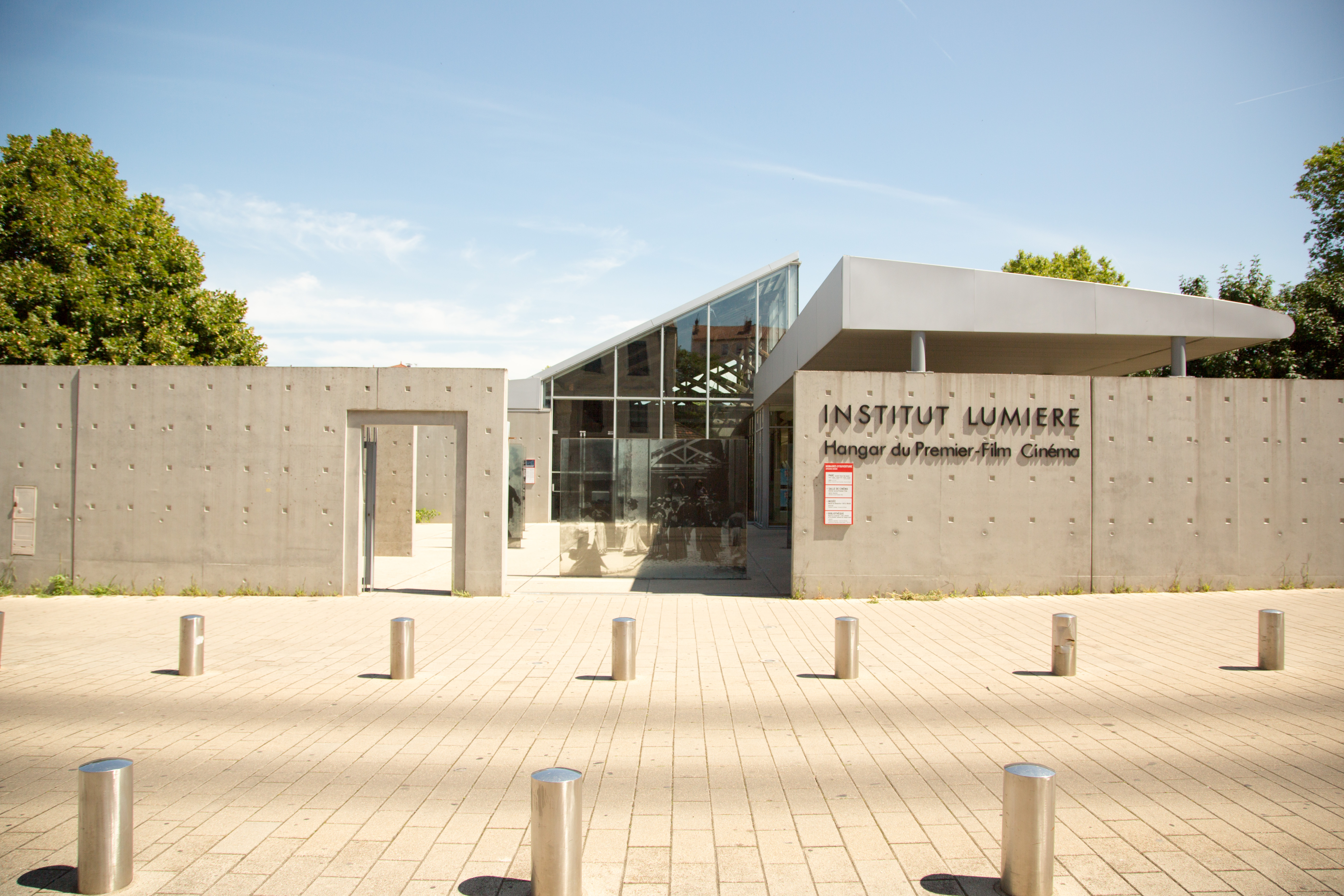
The present-day entrance to the institute, with a glass projection displaying where factory workers were captured on film leaving the factory

== See also ==
- Place Ambroise-Courtois
- Jacques Deray Prize, a film award presented by the Institut Lumière
