= The Animal That Therefore I Am =

Book by Jacques Derrida

- Cover of the first English-language edition
- Author: Jacques Derrida
- Original title: L'animal que donc je suis
- Translator: David Wills
- Language: French
- Subject: Philosophy
- Publisher: Éditions Galilée, Fordham University Press (English translation)
- Publication date: 2006
- Publication place: France
- English publication date: 2008
- Media type: Print
- Pages: 176 (English translation with translator's notes)
- ISBN: 978-0-8232-2791-4 (English-language edition)

The Animal That Therefore I Am (French: L'Animal que donc je suis) is a book based on the ten-hour address on the subject of "the autobiographical animal" given by the French philosopher Jacques Derrida at the 1997 Cerisy Conference and subsequently published as a long essay under the title, "The Animal That Therefore I Am (More To Follow)". The book has gained notability as signalling Derrida's turn to questions surrounding the ontology of nonhuman animals, the ethics of animal slaughter and the difference between humans and other animals. Derrida's lecture has come to be a foundational text in animal studies within the fields of literary criticism and critical theory. Whilst the text is often seen as marking the "animal turn" in Derrida's oeuvre, Derrida himself said that his interest in animals was in fact present in his earliest writings.

== Publication ==
The address was first partially published in English in the Winter 2002 issue of the journal Critical Inquiry. In 2008 it was republished in a book entitled The Animal That Therefore I Am, which reprinted the address along with an essay entitled "And Say The Animal Responded", and two previously unpublished essays. All of the essays were taken from Derrida's various addresses at the 1997 Cerisy conference.

== Critical responses ==
Tobias Menely suggests that "Derrida is straining after something that is unusually difficult for him to conceptualize", namely the question of pathos that binds the human and nonhuman animal. Menely, in his analysis of Derrida's argument, positions Derrida in a tradition of thinkers that include Thomas More and Jeremy Bentham who, according to Menely, elide the question of the ways in which suffering might be equivocal between species and instead turn to "creaturely passion" for an account of animal ontology.

Donna Haraway in When Species Meet praises Derrida for understanding "that actual animals look back at actual human beings", yet, crucially does not "seriously consider an alternative form of knowing something more about cats and how to look back, perhaps even scientifically, biologically, and therefore also philosophically and intimately." Although largely complimentary of his attempt to address the question of the animal, Haraway surmises that Derrida "failed a simple obligation of companionship" to the specific animal other.

== Derrida and the animal ==
As Derrida himself notes, the question of the animal and animality has been a concern within his writing long before the 1997 Cerisy Conference. Most notably, Derrida talks about the animality of the letter in Writing and Difference (1967), Heidegger's pronouncement on the animal being "poor in world" in Of Spirit (1989) and, in an interview with Jean-Luc Nancy entitled "Eating Well, or the Calculation of the Subject" (1989), Derrida discusses the ethics of eating meat. Derrida's final seminars, from 2001 to 2003, extensively discuss animals and animality, and were posthumously published in two volumes under the title The Beast and the Sovereign.

== In film ==
Jean-Luc Godard's 2014 experimental essay film Goodbye to Language (Adieu au Langage) quotes from The Animal That Therefore I Am several times.

In an early scene from Michael Mann's 2015 action thriller Blackhat, The Animal That Therefore I Am can be seen on the prison-cell bookshelf of protagonist Nicholas Hathaway, a convicted hacker played by Chris Hemsworth.

== See also ==
- Narrative identity – Psychological theory
- Cogito ergo sum – Phrase of the philosopher René Descartes
