= Lumière Festival =

Annual film festival held in Lyon, France

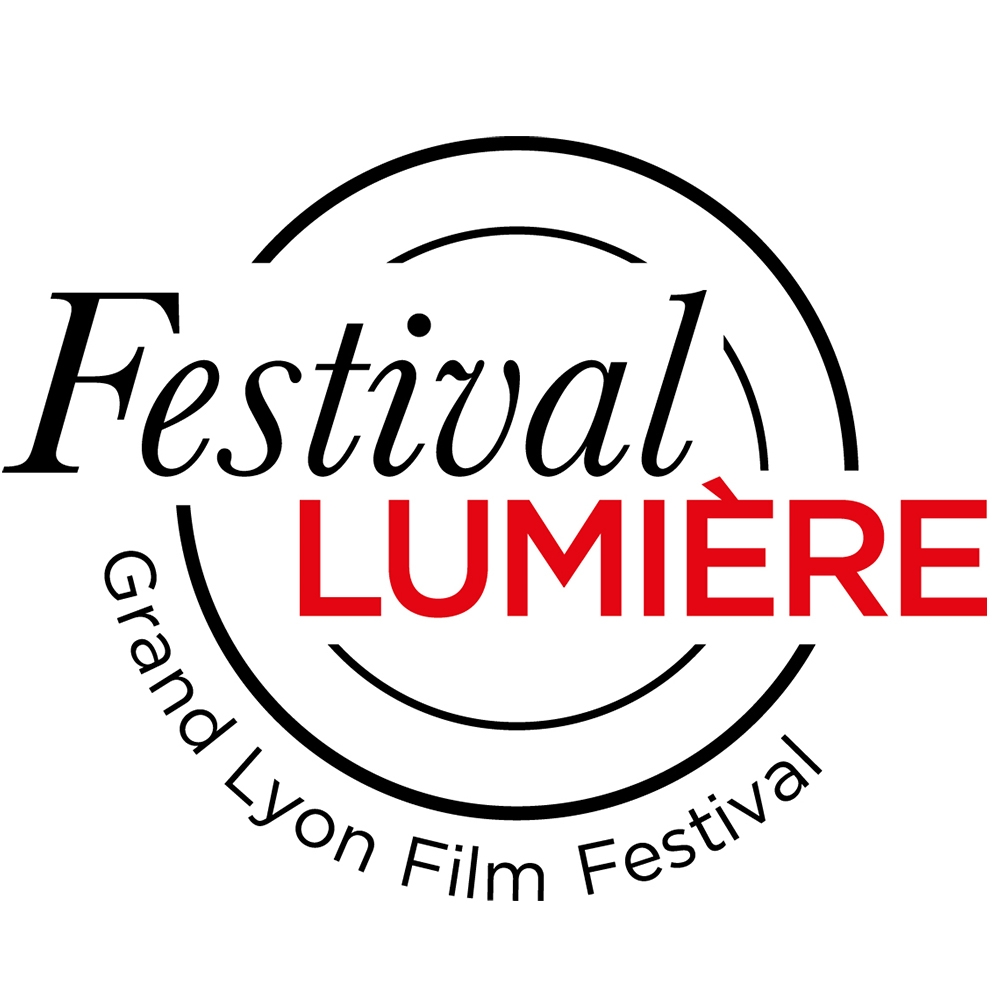

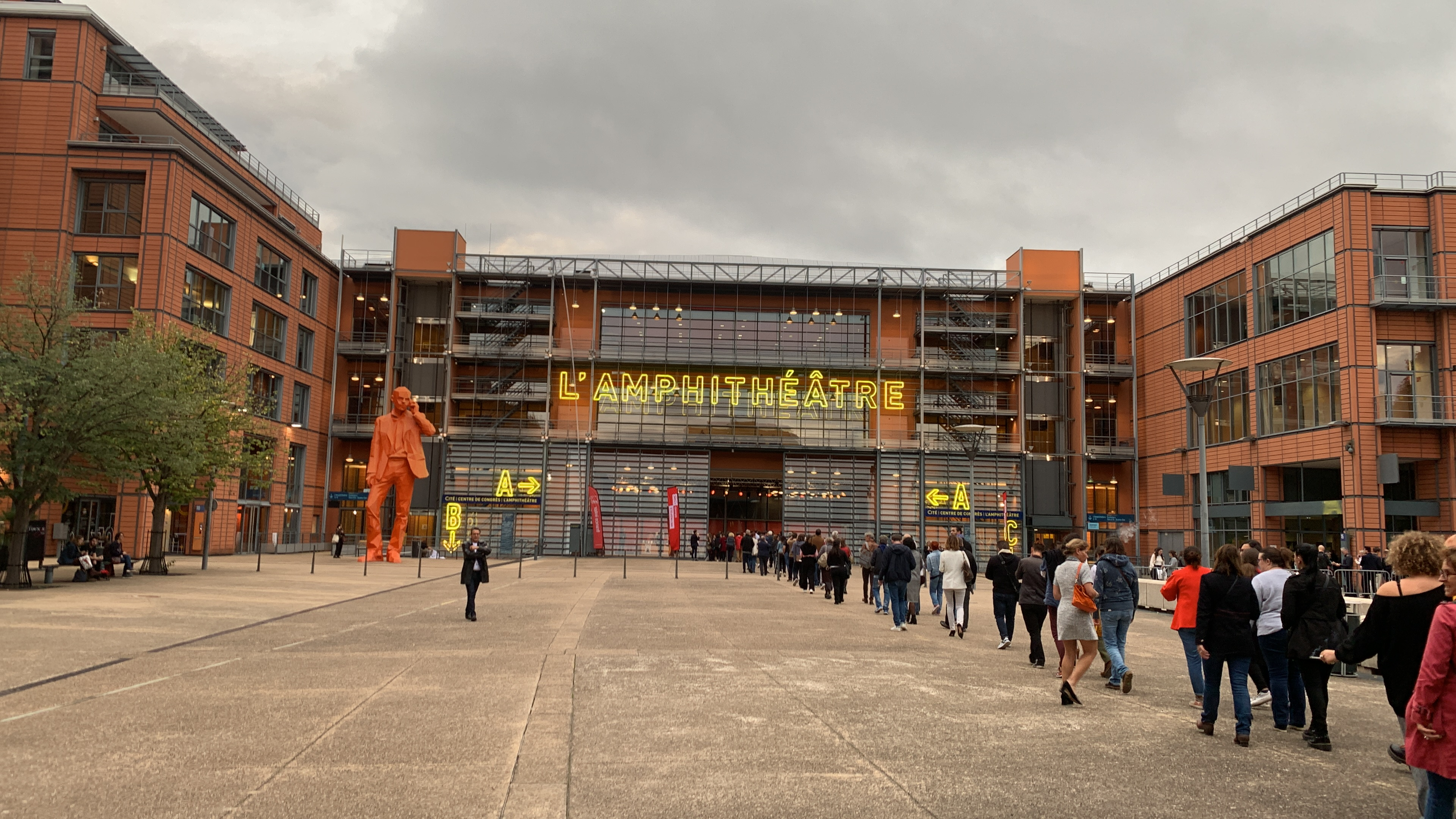
- Entrance to L'Amphithéâtre 3000 in Lyon for the presentation of the 2022 Lumière Award to filmmaker Tim Burton
- Location: Metropolis of Lyon, France
- Founded: 2009
- Hosted by: Institut Lumière
- Website: www.festival-lumiere.org/en/

The Lumière Festival (French: Festival Lumière), also called the Grand Lyon Film Festival or Lumière Film Festival, is an annual film festival held each October in the Metropolis of Lyon, France, since 2009. The festival is named in honor of the Lumière brothers, who invented the Cinématographe motion picture system in 1895, and is organized by the Institut Lumière.

The festival focuses on the history of cinema with the line-up dedicated to the works of the past through restored prints, retrospectives and tributes. The Lumière Award (Prix Lumière), an award that recognizes the achievement and contributions of an international film personality, is also presented annually at the festival.

== Lumière Award recipients ==
Year	Recipient	Note(s)
2009	Clint Eastwood	
2010	Miloš Forman	
2011	Gérard Depardieu	
2012	Ken Loach	
2013	Quentin Tarantino	
2014	Pedro Almodóvar	
2015	Martin Scorsese	
2016	Catherine Deneuve	
2017	Wong Kar-wai	
2018	Jane Fonda	
2019	Francis Ford Coppola	
2020	Dardenne brothers	
2021	Jane Campion	
2022	Tim Burton	
2023	Wim Wenders	
2024	Isabelle Huppert	
2025	Michael Mann	
2026	Joel & Ethan Coen	
