= Monplaisir (Lyon) =

Coordinates: 45.7455°N 4.8714°E

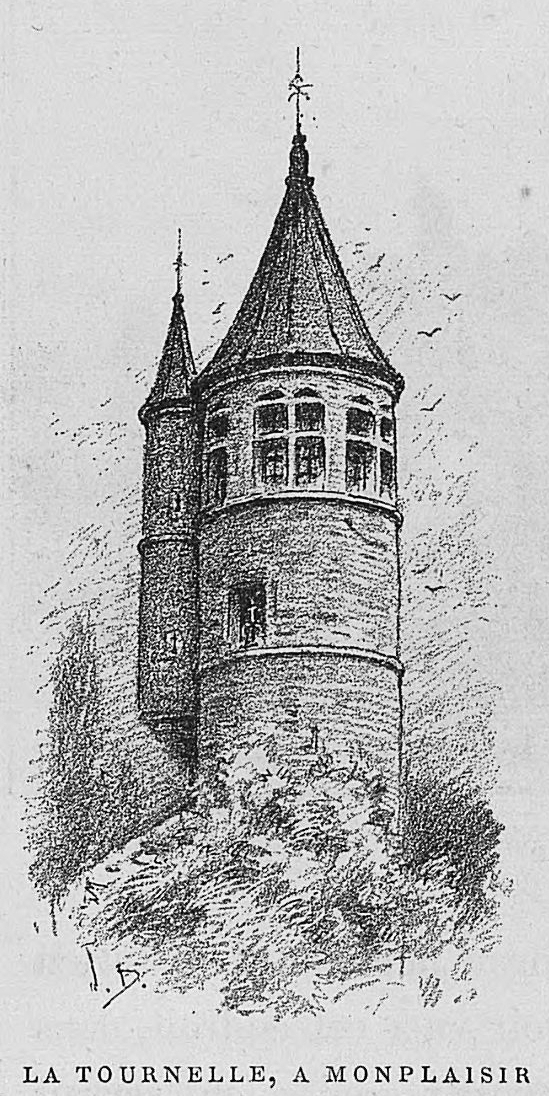

Monplaisir is a historical district (quarter) of Lyon, France, now situated in the 8th arrondissement of Lyon. It is centered on the Ambroise Courtois Square, formerly the Monplaisir Square.

In the southeast of the 8th arrondissement there is the Monplaisir-la-Plaine quarter, or simply La-Plaine.

In the second half of the 19th Century and at the beginning of the 20th Century this place was known for rose breeding with nurseries owned by rose growers such as Joseph Bonnaire or Jean-Baptiste André Guillot.
