= Ladoni =

- Directed by: Artur Aristakisyan
- Written by: Artur Aristakisyan
- Cinematography: Artur Aristakisyan
- Production company: Russian State Institute of Cinema (VGIK)
- Release date: 1994
- Running time: 140 minutes
- Country: Russia
- Language: Russian

Ladoni (Palms) is a 1994 Russian documentary film directed by Artur Aristakisyan.

== Synopsis ==
A man tries to communicate with his unborn son through the faces of people that he encounters in slum areas of late Soviet Moldova. The film makes several existential and religious statements.
