= A Place on Earth (2001 film) =

2001 Russian drama film directed by Artur Aristakisyan

- Directed by: Artur Aristakisyan
- Produced by: Aleksandr Eliasberg, Vitaliy Erenkov
- Starring: Anna Chernova; Vitaliy Khaev; Nonna Grishayeva
- Music by: Robert Wyatt
- Release date: 2001
- Running time: 126 minutes
- Country: Russia
- Language: Russian

A Place on Earth (Russian: Место на земле, romanized: Mesto na zemle) is a 2001 Russian drama film directed by Artur Aristakisyan.

== Plot ==
A delusional man, who has very high hopes and aspirations, tries to help as many people as he can by creating a hippie commune called the Temple of Love.
