= Jean Santeuil =

Book by Marcel Proust

- First English edition
- Author: Marcel Proust
- Language: French
- Genre: Modernist
- Publisher: Gallimard
- Publication date: 1952
- Publication place: France
- English publication date: 1955

Jean Santeuil (French: [ʒɑ̃ sɑ̃tœj]) is an unfinished novel written by Marcel Proust. It was written between 1896 and 1900, and published after the author's death. The first French edition was published in 1952 by Gallimard. The first English version, translated from the French by Gerard Hopkins, was published in 1955 by Weidenfeld & Nicolson in the UK and in 1956 by Simon & Schuster in the US. It was first printed in three volumes, as the novel is over nine-hundred pages long.

The novel is referred to as a precursor to Proust's most significant work, À la recherche du temps perdu (In Search of Lost Time) both thematically and in its plot, although it is more plainly autobiographical than Proust's later works.

== Plot ==
Jean Santeuil tells the story of a young man, Jean Santeuil, who loves literature and poetry. The novel chronicles his childhood and his entry into the broader world. This includes his movement into high society within late nineteenth-century Paris and his adventures in other places, such as Illiers and Brittany.

== Analysis ==
The novel deals with the relationship between writers and society.

The composer Reynaldo Hahn, with whom Proust had a brief but intense love affair, was the inspiration for the eponymous protagonist, Jean Santeuil.
