= Artur Aristakisyan =

Armenian-Russian film director

Artur Aristakisyan (Russian: Арту́р Аристакися́н) is an Armenian-Russian film director. He was born in Chişinău (Moldavian SSR, Soviet Union, now Moldova) in 1961.

== Filmography ==
- 1994 Ladoni (Palms)
- 2001 Mesto na zemle (A Place on Earth)
