= Gilles Jacob =

French film critic and essayist (born 1930)

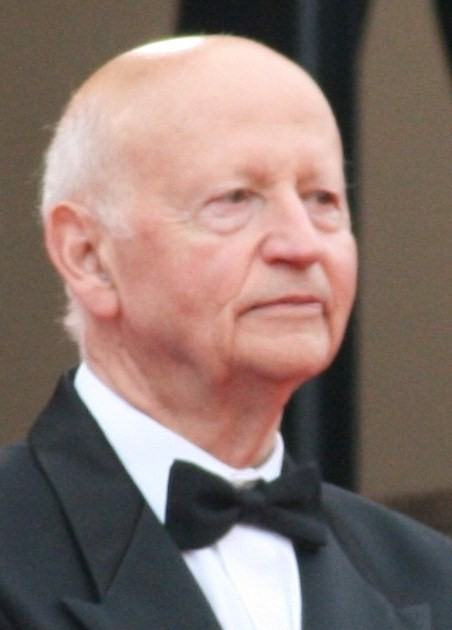
- Born: 22 June 1930 (age 96); Paris, France
- Occupation: Film critic

Gilles Jacob (born 22 June 1930) is a French film critic and essayist who served as president of the Cannes Film Festival between 2001 and 2014.

== Life and career ==
Born in Paris, the son of an entrepreneur, Jacob studied at the Lycée Louis-le-Grand, having Claude Chabrol as a schoolmate. At 17 years old, he co-founded a short-lived cinema magazine, Raccords. He then collaborated as a film critic and journalist with several publications, including Cinéma, Les Nouvelles littéraires, and L'Express.

In 1976, he was named deputy delegate general of the Cannes Film Festival before becoming delegate general in 1978, finally becoming president of the festival from 2001 to 2014. He stayed in the festival's board of directors until 2018, and he has since then served as a member of the General Assembly of the festival. Among his initiatives were the foundation of the Un Certain Regard selection, the Caméra d'Or award, and the Cinéfondation.

During his career, Jacob received various honours and accolades, notably the Legion of Honour. He served as a juror at the 47th Venice International Film Festival.
