= American Made =

American Made may refer to:

== Music ==
- American Made (The Oak Ridge Boys album), 1983
  - "American Made" (song), the title track from the album
- American Made (Wakefield album), 2003
- American Made, album by BoDeans, 2012
- "American Made", a 1997 song by Jack Off Jill from Sexless Demons and Scars
- "American Made", an album by BPMD in 2020

== Other uses ==
- American Made (book), a 2021 non-fiction book by Farah Stockman
- American Made (film), a 2017 film starring Tom Cruise
- Made in USA, a country of origin mark
- American Made (professional wrestling), a professional wrestling stable

== See also ==
- Made in USA (disambiguation)
- Made in America (disambiguation)
- American Maid
