= Portsmouth Pyramids Centre =

Leisure centre in Portsmouth, England

Coordinates: 50.778989°N 1.085393°W

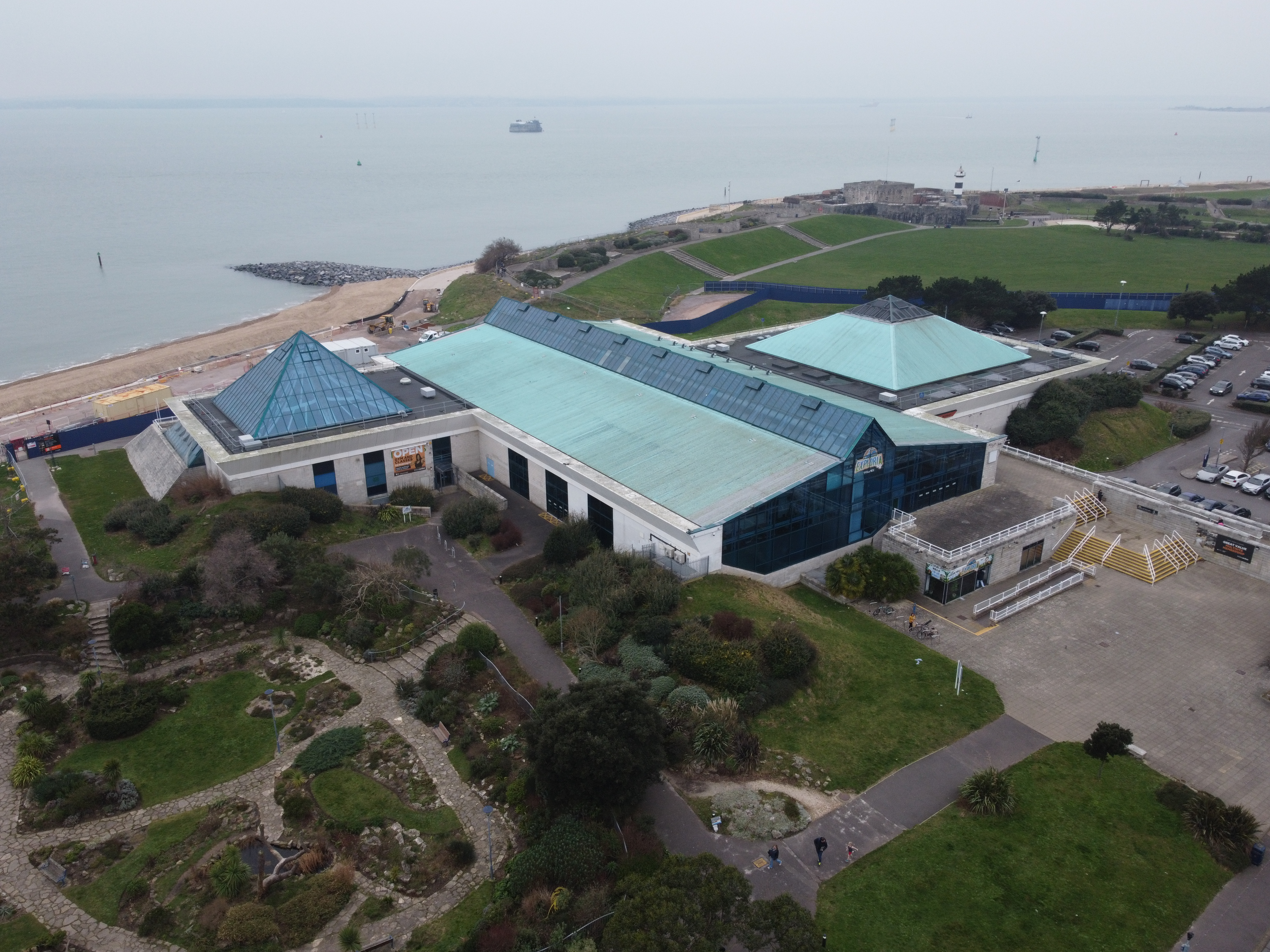
Aerial view of Portsmouth Pyramids Centre

The Portsmouth Pyramids Centre (also known as The Pyramids) is an indoor leisure complex in Southsea, Portsmouth, Hampshire, England.

It has a live arena, leisure gym and function rooms. The function room, located next door to the indoor leisure complex, is, along with the Portsmouth Guildhall and Wedgewood Rooms, a popular venue for live music.

Artists that have performed at Pyramids Centre include Roger Taylor, Feeder, You Me at Six, Bring Me the Horizon, Asking Alexandria, Example, The Darkness, Arctic Monkeys & Gallows.

== Location ==
Located on Southsea Seafront between Clarence Pier and South Parade Pier, the Pyramids Centre is situated just 25 m from the sea.

== History ==
In 1982, Portsmouth City Council outlined its plan to update the image of promoting the City as a tourist resort in the document "Tourism and Portsmouth". This signalled the move away from "Come to Sunny Southsea" to "Portsmouth : Flagship of Maritime England", with the aim of emphasising the City's Naval Heritage to encourage people to have a holiday in the area. This approach was based on the establishment of the Maritime Heritage Area. There was a need however, to still provide for the traditional holiday maker and so other tourist facilities were required to supplement those existing and this resulted in the development of the Sea Life Centre. Given the great British weather, there was also a need for a wet weather facility, which was the starting point for the Pyramid Centre.

Planning permission was granted in July 1986 for the development of a water-leisure & conference centre on the site of the old Rock Gardens Pavilion site. The Pavilion was single storey in height and had provided an entertainment facility on the seafront for a number of years, but was rundown and needed replacing. There was also a bandstand in the middle of the rock garden area as well. This offered an ideal site for a modern tourism orientated facility with its location adjoining the Rock Gardens and Castle Fields. The scheme was, therefore, set for a leisure and entertainment facility.

The Pyramids was opened to the public in July 1988. It was developed by Clifford Barnett Developments Ltd in partnership with the City Council at a cost of £8.5m. The Developer's architects were Charles Smith Architects from Boston Spa, West Yorkshire. The centre was managed initially by a partnership between J. Lyons Catering Ltd and Clifford Barnett. An agreement was entered into by the City Council whereby profits and losses were shared during the first ten years. However, due to a number of factors the City Council took over the management of the centre. It was from the start controlled by Portsmouth Operating Company Limited whose Directors included the Chair of the Leisure Committee.

== Further development ==
There have been a number of changes to the use of the building since it was built including allowing auction/sales to take place 24 days a year; and adding in December 1993 a wine bar, known as the "Frog on the Front" on the front elevation where there used to be a Tourist Information Centre and a retail shop at the lower ground floor level. The venue has been quite successfully used as a night-club at the weekends. In August 1995 planning permission was granted for a single storey extension to the southern terrace, and in July 1996 permission was granted for the construction of a canopy over the north entrance.

== Today ==
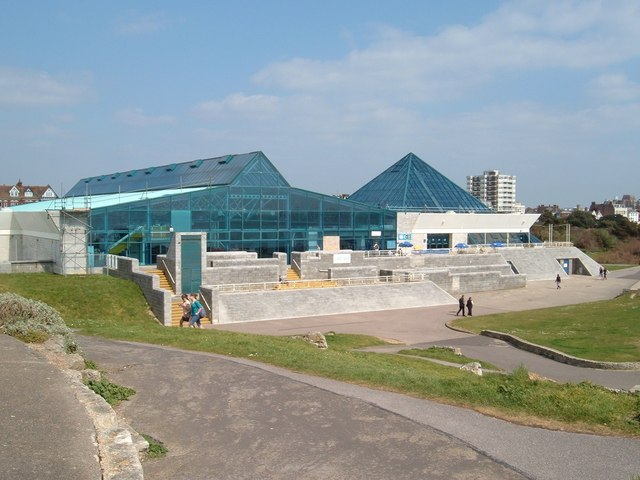
The seaward side of the Pyramids

The centre is now operated by BH Live and contains Exploria, an indoor adventure soft play area for children, which replaced the former leisure waters.

== Sports Events ==
The centre hosted the Darts Untouchables event, which saw players including Phil Taylor compete.

== Notable acts that played at the Pyramids Centre ==
Since 1991, the Pyramids Centre has been a major music venue in the city with an audience capacity of 1,150.

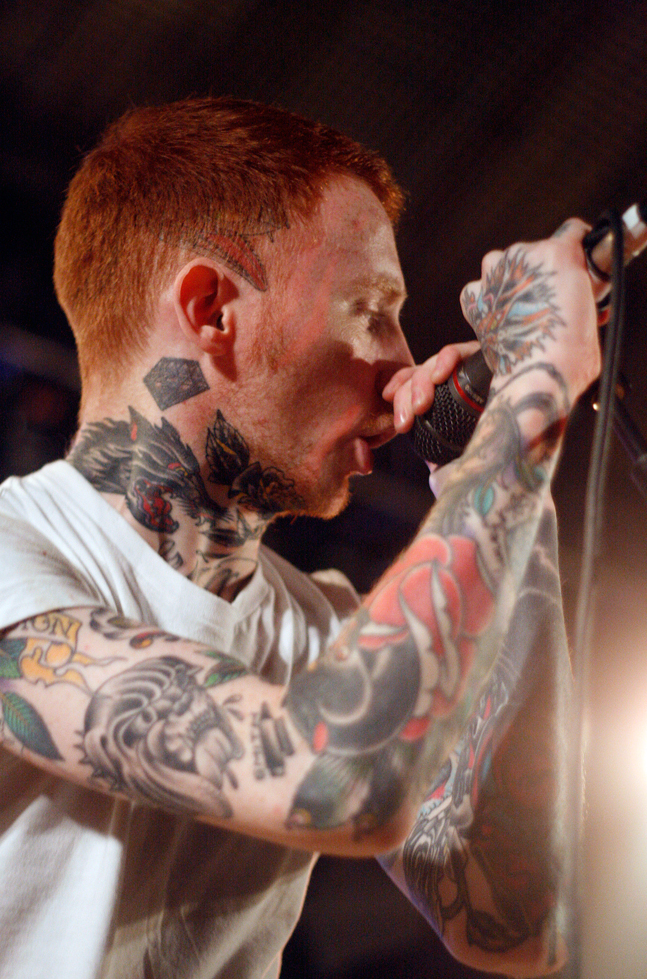
The band Gallows playing the Pyramids

- Arctic Monkeys
- A Day to Remember
- Adam Ant
- Alexisonfire
- Alkaline Trio
- Andrew W.K.
- Andy Biersack
- Anti-Flag
- Architects
- Avenged Sevenfold
- Barenaked Ladies
- Ben Folds Five
- Ben Howard
- Biffy Clyro
- Billy Talent
- Black Rebel Motorcycle Club
- Black Veil Brides
- Blessthefall
- Bloc Party
- Bloodhound Gang
- Bring me the horizon
- Bush
- Canned Heat
- Charlie Simpson
- Chase & Status
- CKY
- Coldplay
- Cradle of Filth
- Creeper
- Crown the Empire
- Daughter
- Deaf Havana
- Death Cab for Cutie
- Deftones
- Dio
- Disturbed
- DragonForce
- Drenge
- Eagles of Death Metal
- Echo and the Bunnymen
- Echobelly
- Editors
- EELS
- Elbow
- Electric Six
- Embrace
- Enter Shikari
- Europe
- Everything Everything
- Faith No More
- Feeder
- Fightstar
- Flogging Molly
- Foals
- Frank Iero
- Frank Turner
- Franz Ferdinand
- Gabrielle Aplin
- George Ezra
- Hands Like Houses
- Hatebreed
- Hawkwind
- HIM
- Hot Chip
- Idlewind
- Ill Niño
- In Flames
- James Bay
- Jimmy Eat World
- Kasabian
- Killswitch Engage
- Lacuna Coil
- Letlive.
- Levellers (band)
- Little Comets
- Lostprophets
- Lower Than Atlantis
- Machine Head
- Mallory Knox
- Marina and the Diamonds
- Mark Lanegan
- Marmozets
- Maxïmo Park
- Mayday Parade
- Miles Kane
- Milk Teeth
- Motion City Soundtrack
- Motörhead
- Mudvayne
- Muse
- My Chemical Romance
- Mystery Jets
- Nazareth
- New Found Glory
- Gary Numan
- Of Mice & Men
- Opeth
- Our Last Night
- Palma Violets
- Panic! at the Disco
- Papa Roach
- Paramore
- Parkway Drive
- Peace
- Placebo
- Primal Scream
- Public Service Broadcasting
- Pulled Apart by Horses
- Radiohead
- Rancid
- Reef
- Reel Big Fish
- Rise Against
- Roger Taylor
- Royal Blood
- Say Anything
- Seether
- Sepultura
- Skindred
- Slaves
- Snow Patrol
- Son of Dork
- Spiritualized
- State Champs
- Steve Harley & Cockney Rebel
- Suede
- Taking Back Sunday
- Teenage Fanclub
- Terrorvision
- The Big Moon
- The Boomtown Rats
- The Coral
- The Cranberries
- The Cribs
- The Damned
- The Dandy Warhols
- The Darkness
- The Fall
- The Hoosiers
- The Human League
- The Kooks
- The Maine
- The Pigeon Detectives
- The Prodigy
- The Script
- The Story So Far
- The Stranglers
- The Vaccines
- The Wytches
- The Zutons
- Therapy?
- Tonight Alive
- Travis
- Trivium
- Twin Atlantic
- Urban Vocal Group
- Volbeat
- We Are Scientists
- We Are the in Crowd
- We Are The Ocean
- White Lies
- Wolf Alice
- You Me at Six
