= Red letter day (disambiguation) =

A red letter day is any day of special significance or opportunity. Common red letter days of the year are marked in red in a calendar.

Red letter day may also refer to:

== Film and television ==
- Red Letter Day (film), 2019 satirical horror film
- Red Letter Day (TV series), British anthology of teleplays, many by Jack Rosenthal

== Music ==
- Red Letter Day (band), English punk rock band
- Red Letter Days (album), 2002 rock album by The Wallflowers
- Red Letter Day (EP), 1999 emo/pop punk EP release by The Get Up Kids
- "A Red Letter Day", single from the Pet Shop Boys

== Other ==
- "A Red Letter Day", a chapter in the video game Half-Life 2
- Red Letter Days, experiential gifts company in the UK
- Red ink, in hand lettering
