= Made in America =

Made in America may refer to:

- Made in USA, a country of origin label

== Films ==
- Made in America (1993 film), a 1993 American comedy film starring Whoopi Goldberg and Ted Danson
- Made in America (2013 film), a 2013 American documentary film directed by Ron Howard

== Literature ==
- Made in America (book), a non-fiction book by Bill Bryson
- Made in America: My Story, the autobiography of Wal-Mart's founder Sam Walton

== Music ==
- Made in America (EP), an EP by Aerosmith, 2001
- Made in America (Kam album), 1995
- Made in America (The Blues Brothers album), 1980
- Made in America (The Carpenters album), 1981
- Made in America (Tower), a 2004 orchestral composition by Joan Tower
- Made in America, an EP by Cimorelli, 2013
- "Made in America" (Jay-Z and Kanye West song), 2011
- "Made in America" (Toby Keith song), 2011
- Made in America Festival, a music festival in Philadelphia founded by Jay-Z

== Television ==
- Made in America (game show), a 1964 program produced by MGM Television
- "Made in America" (The Sopranos), the final episode of The Sopranos
- Made in America (TV program), a show on the Travel Channel hosted by John Ratzenberger
- Made in America, an Irish documentary series nominated for a 2006 Irish Film and Television Award

== See also ==
- American Made (disambiguation)
- Crips and Bloods: Made in America, a documentary film directed by Stacy Peralta
- In America (film), a film directed by Jim Sheridan
- Made in USA (disambiguation)
- O.J.: Made in America, a 2016 American documentary produced and directed by Ezra Edelman
- Ornette: Made in America, a documentary about Ornette Coleman, directed by Shirley Clarke
