= Charles Bitsch =

- Born: Louis Charles Bitsch; April 23, 1931; Mulhouse, France
- Died: May 27, 2016 (aged 85); Villejuif, France
- Education: École nationale supérieure Louis-Lumière
- Occupations: Film director; cinematographer; assistant director; film critic
- Known for: Work on the French New Wave

Charles Bitsch (born Louis Charles Bitsch; 23 April 1931 – 27 May 2016) was a French cinematographer, assistant director, film critic, and film director. A member of the Cahiers du cinéma circle in the 1950s, he worked as cinematographer and assistant director on early films of the French New Wave, collaborating extensively with Jacques Rivette, Claude Chabrol, Jean-Luc Godard, and Jean-Pierre Melville. He directed one theatrical feature, the post-apocalyptic Le Dernier Homme (1969).

== Biography ==
Bitsch was born in Mulhouse in 1931 and moved to Paris with his family in 1934. He studied at the École nationale supérieure Louis-Lumière from 1951 to 1953, training as a director of photography.

He became involved with the Cahiers du cinéma group through the ciné-club Objectif 49, where he met François Truffaut and Jacques Rivette. He published his first article for the journal in 1955 and contributed reviews, bio-filmographies, and interviews over the following years, notably conducting interviews with Orson Welles (with André Bazin), Nicholas Ray, Vincente Minnelli, and Anthony Mann. He also wrote for the magazine Arts, occasionally under the pseudonym Louis Chabert.

As cinematographer, he shot Rivette's Le Coup du berger (1956), which he co-wrote, and Paris nous appartient (1961), as well as Éric Rohmer's short Véronique et son cancre (1958). As assistant director, he worked on Chabrol's Le Beau Serge (1958), Les Bonnes Femmes (1960), and Landru (1962), and on Melville's Le Doulos (1962).

His longest professional association was with Godard, for whom he served as assistant director on Vivre sa vie (1962), Les Carabiniers (1963), Le Mépris (1963), Alphaville (1965), Made in U.S.A. (1966), 2 ou 3 choses que je sais d'elle (1967), and La Chinoise (1967), among others. For Alphaville, Bitsch wrote a thirty-page treatment that Godard submitted to financiers without reading. He also located the Villa Malaparte on Capri for the filming of Le Mépris and negotiated access to the site. Writing in Cahiers du cinéma after Bitsch's death, Alain Bergala described him as the person on whom Godard had always known he could rely, at whatever post was needed.

His sole theatrical feature, Le Dernier Homme (1969), was a science fiction film set in an underground bunker after a global catastrophe, photographed by Pierre Lhomme. Financed with a loan from Godard's production company Anouchka Films and additional funds from Philippe de Broca, the film won the grand prize at the Festival of Trieste but was not a commercial success. From the mid-1970s he worked primarily in French television, directing TV films and episodes of series including Pause-café (1989).

Bitsch died on 27 May 2016 in Villejuif, aged 85.

== Filmography ==
=== As director ===
Year	Title	Notes
1963	Les Baisers	segment "Cher baiser"
1964	La Chance et l'amour	segment "Lucky la chance"
1969	Le Dernier Homme	feature film
1981	Le Marteau-piqueur	television film
1985	L'Homme des couloirs	television film
1989	Pause-café pause-tendresse	television series
1994	Le Bel Horizon	television film

=== As cinematographer ===
Year	Title	Director
1952	Le Divertissement	Jacques Rivette
1956	Le Coup du berger	Jacques Rivette
1958	Véronique et son cancre	Éric Rohmer
1961	Paris nous appartient	Jacques Rivette

=== As assistant director (selected) ===
Year	Title	Director
1958	Le Beau Serge	Claude Chabrol
1959	À double tour	Claude Chabrol
1960	Les Bonnes Femmes	Claude Chabrol
1962	Vivre sa vie	Jean-Luc Godard
1962	Landru	Claude Chabrol
1962	Le Doulos	Jean-Pierre Melville
1963	Les Carabiniers	Jean-Luc Godard
1963	Le Mépris	Jean-Luc Godard
1965	Alphaville	Jean-Luc Godard
1966	Made in U.S.A.	Jean-Luc Godard
1967	2 ou 3 choses que je sais d'elle	Jean-Luc Godard
1967	La Chinoise	Jean-Luc Godard
