= Made in America Festival =

Annual music festival in Philadelphia, U.S.

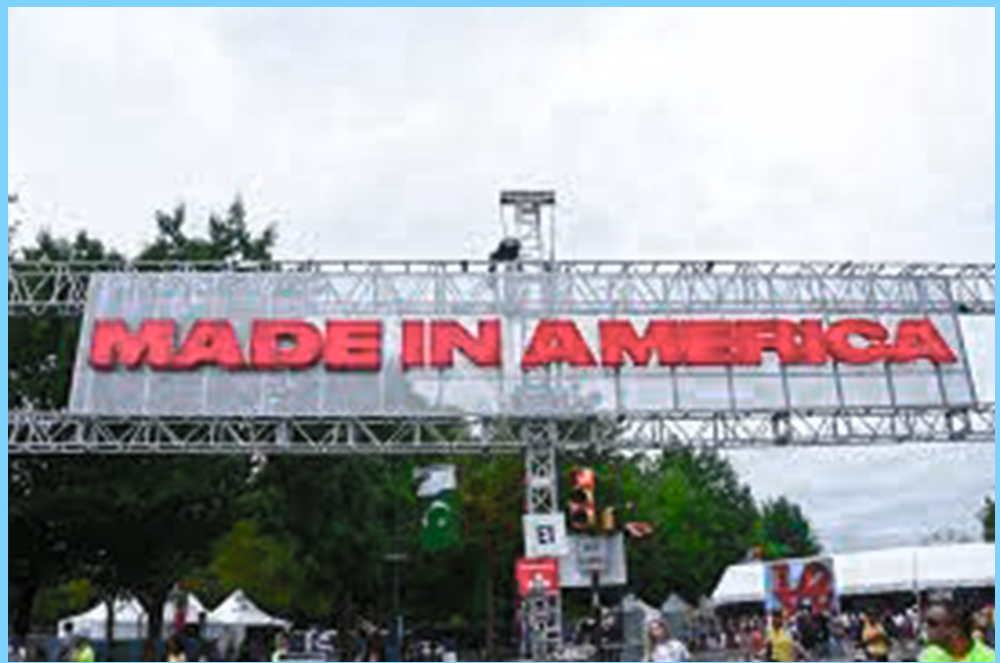
- Genre: Hip-hop; indie rock; experimental rock; EDM; alternative rock; R&B; pop; Latin
- Dates: Labor Day weekend
- Locations: 2012–19, 2021–2022 Benjamin Franklin Parkway, Philadelphia, Pennsylvania, U.S. 2014 Grand Park, Los Angeles, California, U.S.
- Years active: 2012–2019, 2021–2022
- Founders: Shawn "Jay-Z" Carter
- Website: madeinamericafest.com

The Made in America Festival is a two-day music festival held every Labor Day weekend on the Benjamin Franklin Parkway in Philadelphia, Pennsylvania. It was first announced by entertainer Shawn "Jay-Z" Carter at Philadelphia Museum of Art on May 14, 2012.

In 2014, the Los Angeles, California edition was added to the Made in America Festival, hence marking the first multi-day music festival staged simultaneously on opposite ends of the United States.

The event has been held annually since 2012, except in 2020 when it was cancelled due to the COVID-19 pandemic, and in 2023, which was cancelled due to other complications beyond the organizers' control. It was announced that the festival would be cancelled yet again for 2024 on April 3, 2024.

== History ==
The festival was founded in 2012 by rapper and business mogul Jay-Z as a way to bring together music and culture. The inaugural event was held on September 1–2, 2012 on Benjamin Franklin Parkway in Philadelphia. It grossed $5 million in ticket sales and attracted about 80,000 people. Philadelphia city officials reported that the festival generated around $10 million in economic impact for the city.

In 2012, Pearl Jam were joined onstage by Jay-Z to perform the song "99 Problems". For their appearance at the festival, the band earned $2 million.

As of 2012, the festival features three stages of live music: Rocky Stage, Liberty Stage, and Freedom Tent (which primarily features electronic music). The festival also features an array of vendors, food trucks, carnival games, refillable water stations, and portable toilets.

In Budweiser's 'Makers of Tomorrow' ad, which promoted the theme of the festival, Jay-Z narrated, "Through all the lines and things that are put in place to divide each other, all like-minded people gather together. We're more curious than ever. We create music to express ourselves. And when the world relates, ya know, that's beautiful things. We're all trading off each other's culture. So no matter what lines you put—country, indie rock, rap—we're all somehow gonna find a way to come together cause the lines and the titles can never keep us apart. This is what we've been. To put that on display for the world is, is just being honest. That's it, that's what it's all about. We are finally living out our creed."

The festival was the subject of the 2013 documentary Made in America, directed by Ron Howard and produced by Brian Grazer and Jay-Z. In a statement to the press, Howard called the documentary "a reflection of the fabric of what it means to be 'Made in America'—what the festival represents, why Jay is doing it and how he relates to each artist."

On April 16, 2014, Jay-Z and Eric Garcetti (the mayor of Los Angeles) held a press conference at Los Angeles City Hall and announced that the Made in America Festival would take place not only in Philadelphia, but in Los Angeles as well during the 2014 Labor Day weekend. The location of the Los Angeles festival would be Grand Park. "On Labor Day weekend we are going to celebrate our golden state of mind right here in LA with a sellout crowd right on the steps of city hall and into Grand Park," Garcetti said. "The 'Made in America Festival' will attract 50,000 fans Saturday and Sunday. Fans who will inject millions of dollars into the LA economy."

On May 19, 2015, it was announced the festival would return to its original format of being solely held in Philadelphia after disappointing ticket sales from last year's LA edition of the festival. In 2015 Budweiser also replaced its Made in America tour with its new Monument Series. The Monument Series which leads up to the main festival took place at both the Statue of Liberty in New York and the Golden Gate Bridge in San Francisco, California.

The festival was not held in 2020 due to the COVID-19 pandemic, with tickets carrying over to the next edition. The festival returned in 2021, only to be cancelled again in 2023 and 2024 for unspecified reasons.

== Lineups ==
=== 2012 ===
Saturday, September 1

- Jay-Z
- Skrillex
- Miike Snow
- Calvin Harris
- Passion Pit
- Maybach Music Group (featuring Rick Ross, Wale and Meek Mill)
- Gary Clark Jr.
- D'Angelo
- Dirty Projectors
- Nicky Romero
- Janelle Monáe
- Michael Woods
- Otto Knows
- Savoy
- Funkagenda
- Prince Royce

Sunday, September 2

- Pearl Jam
- Drake
- Jill Scott
- Run-DMC
- Gary Clark Jr.
- Afrojack
- Odd Future
- Alesso
- Santigold
- The Hives
- Rita Ora
- The Knocks
- Burns
- DJ Shadow
- X
- Betatraxx
- Milkman
- P.A.W.N. LASER / Louis Capet XXVI

=== 2013 ===
Saturday, August 31

- Beyoncé
- Deadmau5
- Phoenix
- Empire of the Sun
- Imagine Dragons
- 2 Chainz
- Public Enemy
- A$AP Rocky
- Haim
- Walk The Moon
- Wolfgang Gartner
- Porter Robinson
- TJR
- Rudimental
- Redlight
- Mord Fustang

Sunday, September 1

- Nine Inch Nails
- Calvin Harris
- Queens of the Stone Age
- Macklemore and Ryan Lewis
- Wiz Khalifa
- Miguel
- Kendrick Lamar
- Emeli Sandé
- The Gaslight Anthem
- Fitz and the Tantrums
- Feed Me
- Schoolboy Q
- Solange
- Jay Rock
- Nero
- Robert Delong
- Ab-Soul
- GTA
- AlunaGeorge
- Jesse Rose
- Diarrhea Planet

=== 2014 ===
In April 2014, it was announced that the 2014 Made in America festival would take place in both Philadelphia and Los Angeles. A press conference given by Jay-Z and the mayor of Los Angeles, Eric Garcetti, explained how the added location was designed to involve both the west and east coasts of the United States in the multi-genre festival. The 2014 festival reportedly delivered "twice the amount of music" as the previous years of the festival, and also benefitted the United Way of Greater Los Angeles, United Way of Philadelphia and Southern New Jersey, and United Way of Lancaster County.

Philadelphia

Saturday, August 30

- Kanye West
- The National
- J. Cole
- Chromeo
- Girl Talk
- Spoon
- Grimes
- R3hab
- Gareth Emery
- Steve Aoki
- Kongos
- 3lau
- The Neighbourhood
- Penguin Prison
- Destructo
- Bleachers
- Young & Sick
- Vacationer
- Holy Ghost!
- Cut Snake
- The OBGMs

Sunday, August 31

- Kings Of Leon
- Pharrell Williams
- Big Daddy Kane
- City And Colour
- Awolnation
- Baauer
- Tommy Trash
- Tiesto
- Mayer Hawthorne
- Danny Brown
- YG
- Holy Ghost!
- DJ Cassidy
- Cherub
- MisterWives
- Will Sparks
- CRUISR
- Kaneholler

Los Angeles

Saturday, August 30

- Imagine Dragons
- Kendrick Lamar
- Afrojack
- Iggy Azalea
- Sublime with Rome
- Metric
- Capital Cities
- Gareth Emery
- Schoolboy Q
- Borgore
- DVBBS
- YG
- Mute Math
- Dr. Dog
- Hit-Boy
- ZZ Ward
- Classixx
- Ab-Soul
- Isaiah Rashad
- Jay Rock
- Cut Snake
- Grandtheft

Sunday, August 31

- John Mayer
- Kanye West
- Juanes
- Steve Aoki
- Rise Against
- Weezer
- Chance The Rapper
- Cypress Hill
- R3hab
- Wolfgang Gartner
- 12th Planet
- Rita Ora
- Nipsey Hussle
- Terraplane Sun
- Yellow Claw
- Will Sparks
- SZA
- Scavenger Hunt
- A Tribe Called Red

=== 2015 ===
The 2015 line-up featured and included Beyoncé, The Weeknd, Bassnectar, Modest Mouse, Axwell and Ingrosso, and J. Cole.

Saturday, September 5

- Beyoncé
- Bassnectar
- Meek Mill
- Nicki Minaj (Special Guest)
- Death Cab For Cutie
- Nick Jonas
- Duke Dumont
- Superheaven
- Hop Along
- Botnek
- Young Rising Sons
- Jacob Plant
- Ryan Hemsworth
- Creepoid
- Bass Drum of Death
- Mike Floss
- Sarah Jaffe
- Tanlines
- De La Soul
- Modest Mouse
- Vic Mensa
- G-Eazy
- DJ Mustard
- Earl Sweatshirt
- The Struts
- Mayaeni
- Cedric Gervais
- Waxahatchee
- Strands of Oaks
- Ground Up

Sunday, September 6

- The Weeknd
- Axwell and Ingrosso
- Santigold
- Cozz
- J. Cole
- Big Sean
- Future
- Hippo Campus
- Action Bronson
- Mick Jenkins
- Halsey
- Fabolous
- Freeway (Special Guest)
- Bizzy Crook
- Flatbush Zombies
- Lolawolf
- Banks
- Lili K
- Marian Hill
- Claude VonStroke
- Jidenna
- Bully
- Metric
- Burns
- Aeroplane
- Saint Motel
- Grits & Biscuts
- Post Malone
- Remy Banks
- Omen
- Disco Fries
- Twin Peaks
- Bas
- GTA
- A-Trak

=== 2016 ===
The 2016 edition held in Philadelphia was headlined by Rihanna and Coldplay. 2016 also included DJ Khaled, Martin Garrix, FKA Twigs, Lil Wayne and 2 Chainz, Edward Sharpe, Jamie xx, Travis Scott, Grimes, Chance the Rapper, Edward Sharpe and the Magnetic Zeroes, Madeon, Desiigner, Gary Clark, Jr., A$AP Ferg, Bibi Bourelly, Lil Yachty, Bryson Tiller, Sza, and Levi Carter.

Saturday

| Rocky Stage | Liberty Stage | Freedom Stage | Skate Stage | Tidal Stage |
|---|---|---|---|---|
| Lil Uzi Vert; SZA; Bryson Tiller; ColleGrove (2 Chainz x Lil Wayne); Rihanna | Dorothy; Justine Skye; A$AP Ferg; Eve; Jamie XX | NVOY; Chris Malinchak; Sleepy Tom; Anna Lunoe; Tchami; DJ Mustard; Adventure Club | Symone; Denzel Curry; Porches; Cherry Glazerr; Gallant; Grits & Biscuits; Into It. Over It. | C-Kan; Colter Wall; Miya Folick; Manolo Rose; Car Seat Headrest; Levi Carter; Dave East; Fat White Family |

Sunday

| Rocky Stage | Liberty Stage | Freedom Stage | Skate Stage | Tidal Stage |
|---|---|---|---|---|
| St. Lucia; Banks & Steelz; Edward Sharpe and the Magnetic Zeros; DJ Khaled; Chance the Rapper; Coldplay | Playboi Carti; Tory Lanez; Gary Clark Jr.; Travis Scott; FKA Twigs; Martin Garrix | What the Duck; SG Lewis; Flat White; Salva; Disciples; Madeon | From Indian Lakes; Day Wave; Aaron West and the Roaring Twenties; Kevin Devine; Basement; Touché Amoré; Red Letter Day | Honduras; Sophie Beem; Show Me the Body; Kevin Garrett; Sir the Baptist; Bibi Bourelly; Lil Yachty; Kacy Hill; Desiigner |

=== 2017 ===
Made in America 2017 was headlined by festival founder Jay-Z, J.Cole and The Chainsmokers.

Rocky Stage
Saturday: Rapsody, Marian Hill, Sampha, Migos, Solange, J. Cole
Sunday: PnB Rock, Kelela, Pusha T, Little Dragon, The Chainsmokers, Jay-Z

Liberty Stage
Saturday: Lizzo, Francis and the Lights, Cardi B, Vic Mensa, Kaskade
Sunday: Broods, Tiwa Savage, 21 Savage, Run the Jewels, Marshmello

Skate Stage
Saturday: Queen of Jeans, Flor, Mt. Joy, Mannequin Pussy, (Sandy) Alex G, J.I.D., EarthGang, Ugly God
Sunday: Busty and the Bass, Public Access T.V., Tommy Genesis, Rob Stone, Japanese Breakfast, Beach Slang, Tigers Jaw, Yung Lean

Tidal Stage
Saturday: Ari Lennox, Karen Rodriguez, Nick Grant, Kodie Shane, Smino, THEY., A Boogie wit da Hoodie, Stormzy
Sunday: Carter Winter, Downtown Boys, Mozart La Para, A R I Z O N A, Jorja Smith, Maleek Berry, Wizkid, Superduperkyle

Freedom Stage
Saturday: DeVault, Kap Slap, London on da Track, Vanic, Dirty South, Salva, Cash Cash
Sunday: Medasin, Burns, Netsky, Green Velvet, Getter, R3hab

=== 2018 ===
Made in America 2018 was held on September 1 and 2 in Philadelphia, it was headlined by Nicki Minaj, Kendrick Lamar, and Post Malone and included Gunna, Fat Joe, 6LACK, and Lil Skies.

Rocky Stage
Saturday: Tyla Yaweh, Jessie Reyez, Tekashi 6ix9ine, Fat Joe, Meek Mill, Post Malone
Sunday: City Morgue, Rich the Kid, Belly, Pusha T, Alessia Cara, Kendrick Lamar, Nicki Minaj

Liberty Stage
Saturday: The Driver Era, Preme, Sabrina Claudio, 6lack, Janelle Monáe, Zedd
Sunday: Gunna, Ty Dolla Sign, Lil Skies, Daniel Caesar, Miguel, Diplo

Skate Stage
Saturday: D'usse Palooza, Armani White, Orion Sun, Injury Reserve, Kweku Collins, Saba, Show Me the Body, White Reaper, Code Orange
Sunday: Mir Fontaine, Zahsosaa, Wicca Phase Springs Eternal, Petal, JPEGMafia, ASAP Twelvyy, Turnstile, Hobo Johnson & the LoveMakers

Tidal Stage
Saturday: Amara La Negra, Odie, Trouble, Shoreline Mafia, Saint Jhn, SOB X RBE, Davido, Juice Wrld, BlocBoy JB
Sunday: Buzzy Lee, Saweetie, Maxo Kream, Sheck Wes, Clairo, Jay Park, Jay Rock, Lil B

Freedom Stage
Saturday: Louis Futon, BloodPop, Elohim, Tokimonsta, Snakehips, Louis the Child
Sunday: Lophile, Lost Kings, Anna Lunoe, Jai Wolf, Cashmere Cat, Tchami

=== 2019 ===
Made in America 2019 was held on August 31 and September 1 at the Benjamin Franklin Parkway in Philadelphia. The 2019 festival was headlined by Travis Scott and Cardi B.

Rocky Stage
Saturday: Dominic Fike, Bazzi, Anderson .Paak & The Free Nationals, Juice Wrld, Cardi B
Sunday: Jacob Banks, Gucci Mane, James Blake, Travis Scott

Liberty Stage
Saturday: Grace Carter, Pink Sweat$, Jorja Smith, Rosalía, Kaskade
Sunday: Kur, Blueface, Lizzo, Lil Uzi Vert

Freedom Stage
Saturday: Yoshi Flower, Elephante, MadeinTYO, Madlib & Freddie Gibbs, Kayzo
Sunday: Phantoms, Channel Tres, SG Lewis, Hippie Sabotage, Kaytranada

Tidal Stage
Saturday: 99 Neighbors, Calboy, Melii, IDK, Buddy, Jay Critch, Roddy Ricch
Sunday: Charly Bliss, Angelica Vila, Amber Mark, Lil Tecca, D'USSE Palooza, Megan Thee Stallion, DaBaby, Tierra Whack

=== 2021 ===
Made in America 2021 was held on September 4–5 at the Benjamin Franklin Parkway in Philadelphia. The 2021 festival was headlined by Justin Bieber and Lil Baby.

Rocky Stage
Saturday: Latto, Coi Leray, Baby Keem, Megan Thee Stallion, Lil Baby
Sunday: Freddie Gibbs, Tinashe, Bobby Shmurda, Roddy Ricch, Justin Bieber

Liberty Stage
Saturday: Morray, Griselda, A$AP Ferg, Young Thug, Kehlani
Sunday: EST Gee, 42 Dugg, Lil Durk, Moneybagg Yo, Doja Cat

Tidal Stage
Saturday: Destin Conrad, Maeta, Duke Deuce, Pi'erre Bourne, Kaash Paige, Fivio Foreign, Bia
Sunday: Gbeke, 26AR, Capella Grey, Cazzu, Mozzy, Mariah the Scientist, Fousheé, Lloyd Banks

=== 2022 ===
Made in America 2022 was held September 3–4 at the Benjamin Franklin Parkway in Philadelphia. The 2022 festival was headlined by Bad Bunny and Tyler, The Creator.

Made in America 2022 was the first major event on the Parkway since the shooting at the Fourth of July fireworks that injured two police officers.

Rocky Stage
Saturday: Larry June, Key Glock, Pusha T, Jazmine Sullivan, Tyler, the Creator
Sunday: Victoria Monét, Tate McRae, Ryan Castro, Don Tolliver, Bad Bunny

Liberty Stage
Saturday: Babyface Ray, Toro Y Moi, JID, Kodak Black, Lil Uzi Vert
Sunday: Chimbala, Fuerza Regida, Rels B, Snoh Aalegra, Burna Boy

Freedom Stage
Saturday: Dixson, Zah Sosaa, Jeleel!, GloRilla, B-Lovee, Jenevieve, Icewear Vezzo, Flo Milli
Sunday: 5′2, Becca Hannah, Kur, Armani White, Ambré, Kalan.Frfr, Coast Contra, Kenny Mason, Young Nudy

=== 2023 ===
Made in America 2023 was scheduled to be held from September 2–3 at the Benjamin Franklin Parkway in Philadelphia, and be headlined by Lizzo and SZA.

On August 8, 2023, the festival was cancelled due to "severe circumstances outside of production control". No official reasons have been given for the cancellation, although the announcement came shortly after a lawsuit alleging sexual misconduct and a hostile work environment was filed against Lizzo.

Planned lineup:

SZA, Miguel, Metro Boomin, Coi Leray, Lil Yachty, Lola Brooke, TiaCorine, Eem Triplin, Tanerélle

Lizzo, Tems, Ice Spice, Latto, Doechii, Coco Jones, Paris Texas, Flau'jae Johnson, Weston Estate, Mase and Cam'ron

== See also ==
- Made in America (disambiguation)
- Made in USA
- List of festivals in the United States
