= Made in USA (disambiguation) =

Made in USA is a country of origin label indicating the product is made in the United States.

Made in USA or Made in the USA may also refer to:

== Film ==
- Made in U.S.A (1966 film), a French film directed by Jean-Luc Godard
- Made in U.S.A. (1987 film), an American film starring Adrian Pasdar and Chris Penn
- Made in USA (2004 film) or Nothing but Life, a bilingual English and Malayalam film by Rajiv Anchal
- Madeinusa, a 2005 film by Claudia Llosa

== Music ==
- Made in U.S.A. (Beach Boys album), 1986
- Made in USA (Pizzicato Five album), 1994
- Made in USA (Sonic Youth album), a soundtrack album from the 1987 film, released in 1995
- "Made in the USA" (song), a 2013 single by Demi Lovato
- "Made in the USA" (Lupe Fiasco song), song on the album Drogas Light

== Other media ==
- Made in USA (sculpture), a 2005 outdoor work by Michael Davis in Seattle, Washington, US
- Made in U.S.A. (novel), a 1966 novel by Alfred Kern
- Made in the USA, a 1939 novel by Hans Otto Storm
- Made in the USA: Global Greed, Bad Tax Laws and The Exportation of America's Future, a 2010 non-fiction book by Barr McClellan
- Made in the USA: The Rise and Retreat of American Manufacturing, a 2013 book by Vaclav Smil

== See also ==
- Made in America (disambiguation)
- American Made (disambiguation)
