= UVG =

UVG may refer to:

- Urban Vocal Group, a musical charity based in Portsmouth City, United Kingdom.
- Universidad del Valle de Guatemala, a private not-for-profit secular university in Guatemala City, Guatemala.
- Universal Airlines (Guyana) (ICAO airline code: UVG)
- Urban Villages Group (UK) the originator of the urban village concept.
- UVG (UK) a coachbuilder that built the UVG Urbanstar
- The Ultra Violet Grasslands and the Black City (UVG), an RPG setting by Luka Rejec
