= Fool's Mate (1956 film) =

- Le Coup du berger
- Directed by: Jacques Rivette
- Screenplay by: Jacques Rivette; Claude Chabrol; Charles Bitsch
- Based on: Mrs. Bixby and the Colonel's Coat
- Produced by: Pierre Braunberger; Claude Chabrol
- Starring: Virginie Vitry; Anne Doat; Etienne Loinod; Jean-Claude Brialy
- Cinematography: Charles Bitsch
- Edited by: Denise de Casabianca
- Music by: François Couperin
- Production company: Les Films de la Pleïade
- Release date: 1956
- Running time: 28 min
- Country: France
- Language: French

Fool's Mate (French: Le Coup du berger) is a 1956 short film directed by Jacques Rivette.

It stars Virginie Vitry as a wife cheating on her husband Jean, telling him she is visiting her sister Solange but spending the time with her lover Claude. When Claude buys her a mink coat, the adulterous pair hatch a plan to avoid her husband's questioning the coat's origins by leaving it in a suitcase at a train station and having him retrieve it after she pretends to find the claim check in a taxi. However, when he brings it home it contains a cheap rabbit-fur coat, and when Solange turns up wearing the mink at a party that night she realizes her husband has checkmated her.

Fool's Mate is considered by some to be the first film of the French New Wave, or the movement's earliest antecedent. Released in 1956, it is something of a curio thanks to a scene in which Rivette and his New Wave contemporaries Claude Chabrol, Jean-Luc Godard, and François Truffaut are seen in the same room as party guests.

== Cast ==
- Virginie Vitry as Claire (Jean's wife)
- Jacques Doniol-Valcroze (credited as Étienne Loinod) as Jean
- Jean-Claude Brialy as Claude (Claire's lover)
- Anne Doat as Solange (Claire's sister)
- François Truffaut as party guest (uncredited)
- Jean-Luc Godard as party guest (uncredited)
- Jean-Claude Brialy as party guest (uncredited)
- Jacques Rivette as narrator (uncredited)
