= Alfred Kern =

American academic and novelist

- Born: Alfred Cohen; August 8, 1924; Alliance, Ohio
- Died: June 2, 2009; Wilmington, North Carolina
- Occupations: Novelist and professor
- Known for: Professor of English at Allegheny College

Alfred Kern (born Alfred Cohen, August 8, 1924 – June 2, 2009) was an American novelist and professor.

== Formative years ==
Born in Alliance, Ohio, he served in the U.S. Army Air Forces from 1942 to 1946 during World War II. He legally changed his name to Alfred Kern in 1946.

Kern graduated from Allegheny College in 1948 and New York University in 1954.

== Academic career ==
He served as the Frederick F. Seely Professor of English at Allegheny College in Meadville, Pennsylvania, from the 1950s until his retirement in the mid-1980s.

During the 1979–1980 academic year, Kern was the distinguished visiting professor of English at the United States Air Force Academy in Colorado Springs, Colorado, an academic experience which inspired several articles relating the arts to the military. These were published in USAF journals.

During the 1980s, he experimented with writing poetry, using computers with an Allegheny College colleague, James Sheridan. According to a family member, he lived in Pittsburgh for roughly ten years after retiring from Allegheny College (from approximately 1987 to 1996), where he is still remembered.

== Death ==
He died on June 2, 2009, in Wilmington, North Carolina.

== Books ==
- The Width of Waters, novel (Boston: Houghton Mifflin, 1959).
- Made in U.S.A., novel (Boston: Houghton Mifflin, 1966).
- The Trial of Martin Ross, novel (New York: W.W. Norton, 1971).

== Articles and papers ==
- "Hang the Enola Gay", published in War, Literature, & the Arts: An International Journal of the Humanities Vol. 7, No. 1 [Spring/Summer 1995], USAF Academy. Anthologized in Understanding the literature of World War II by James H. Meredith, Greenwodd Publishing Group, 1999, ISBN 0-313-30417-3, ISBN 978-0-313-30417-0
- "Waiting for Euripides", published in Journal of Professional Military Ethics, USAF Academy, April 1980. Anthologized in Military Ethics: Reflections on Principles, edited by Maham M. Wakin, James Kempf. DIANE Publishing, 1994, ISBN 0-7881-1311-9, ISBN 978-0-7881-1311-6
- "Humanities at the Hanoi Hilton",War, Literature, & the Arts: An International Journal of the Humanities, USAF Academy. Vol 10, No. 2 Fall/Winter 1998 (see www.wlajournal.com/backissues.htm)
- "Barcelona", A Poem, War, Literature, & the Arts: An International Journal of the Humanities, USAF Academy. Vol 1, No 2 1989–1990
- From "Vows and Infidelities", fiction, War, Literature, & the Arts: An International Journal of the Humanities, USAF Academy. Vol 7, No. 2 Fall/Winter 1995
- "About Literary Wars" War, Literature, & the Arts: An International Journal of the Humanities, USAF Academy. Vol 16, Nos.1&2 2005 Double Issue
- Basic Writing: The Student as Programmer, Paper presented at the 1986 ADE Summer Seminar at the USAF Academy. Referenced by Robert E. Cummings in Coding with power: Toward a rhetoric of computer coding and composition, published in Computers and Composition Volume 23, issue 4 2006 pp 430–443
- "GOTO Poetry", published in Perspectives in Computing #3, pp 44–52 1983. Cited in The Quest for Meaning by Louis Marinoff (p. 74), in Mind Versus Computer: Were Dreyfus and Winograd Right? By Matja Gams, Marcin Paprzycki, Xindong Wu, Penn State Press, 1997 ISBN 4-274-90181-5, ISBN 978-4-274-90181-2

== Sources ==
- Contemporary Authors Online. The Gale Group, 2002. PEN (Permanent Entry Number): 0000053569.
