= Farah Stockman =

American journalist (born 1974)

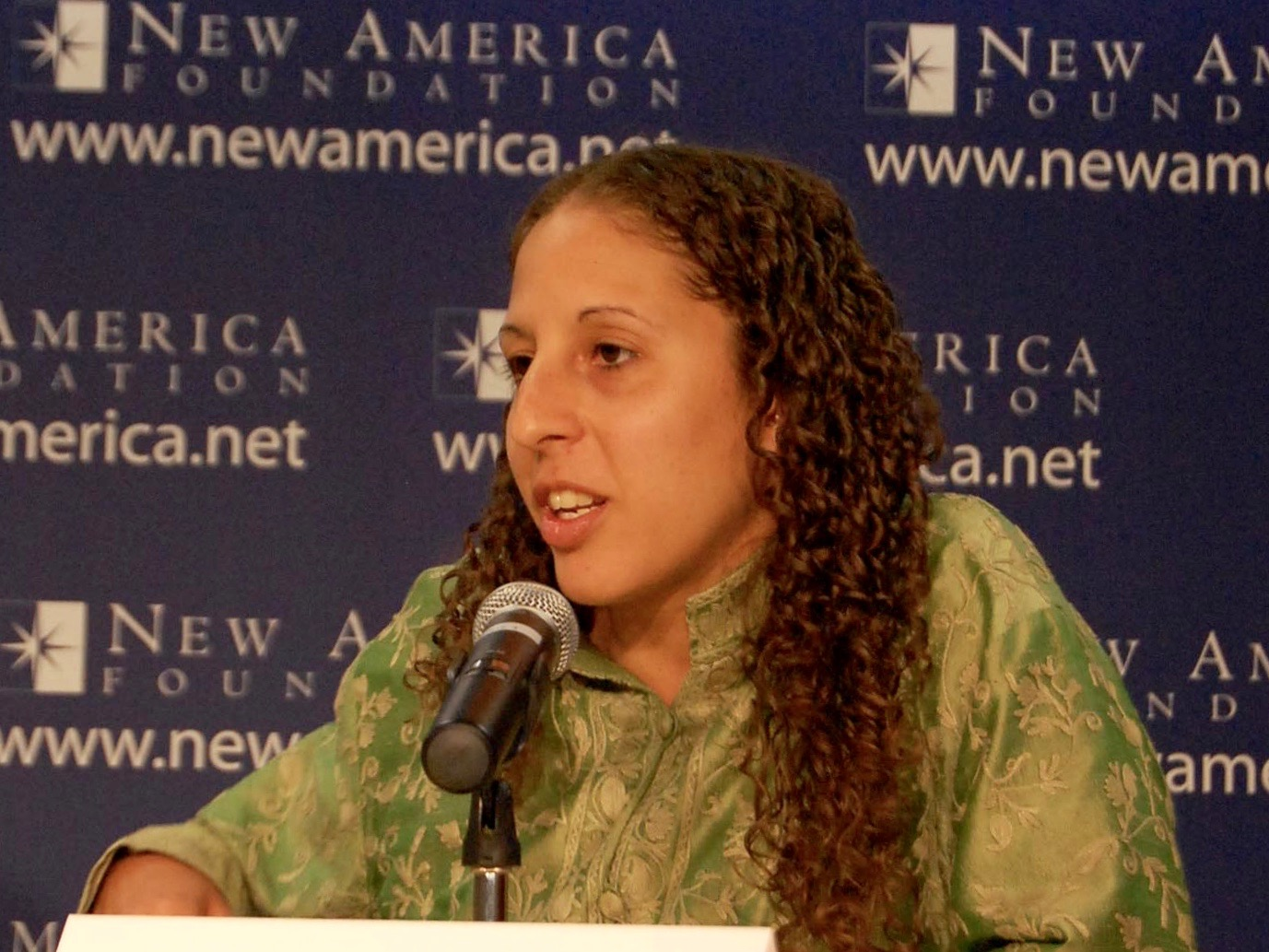
- Stockman in 2009
- Born: Farah Nisa Stockman; May 21, 1974 (age 52); East Lansing, Michigan, U.S.
- Education: Harvard University
- Years active: 1996–present
- Known for: Pulitzer Prize-winning journalist

Farah Nisa Stockman (born May 21, 1974) is an American journalist who has worked for The Boston Globe and is currently employed by The New York Times. In 2016, she was awarded the Pulitzer Prize for Commentary.

== Early life ==
Stockman was born in East Lansing, Michigan, to a white father and a black mother who were Michigan State University professors. She has a sister, Demress.

== Education ==
Stockman attended Radcliffe College, graduating in 1996. She was an active member of the Radcliffe Rugby Football Club. In the summer of 1996, Stockman directed the Mission Hill Summer Program with Harvard's Phillips Brooks House Association.

== Kenya, 1997–2000 ==
Following graduation Stockman served as a school teacher in Kenya for two years. Stockman and other teachers set up the Jitegemee non-governmental organization. While living in Kenya, Stockman began writing for The New York Times, The Christian Science Monitor, the Voice of America and Reuters. During her time in Kenya, Stockman covered the international criminal trials stemming from the Rwandan genocide.

== Attempts to interview Mubarik Shah Gillani ==
Stockman is reported to have been seeking to interview Mubarik Shah Gillani, an individual who was in hiding, who was also being sought by Daniel Pearl at the time of his death. Mariane Pearl, Daniel Pearl's wife, wrote that an article Stockman wrote, linking Gillani to Richard Reid, was the inspiration for her husband to seek the interview that led to his capture and death.

== The Boston Globe ==
Upon her return to the United States, Stockman started working for The Boston Globe. She worked in the Globe's Washington bureau before becoming a member of the paper's editorial board and an editorial columnist. In 2016, she moved to The New York Times.

== Other writing ==
In 2021, Stockman published American Made based on her prior reporting for The New York Times about the Rexnord factory closure.

== Awards ==
Stockman was a winner of an award from the J. W. Saxe Memorial Fund in the 1990s. Stockman won her award for her work "with homeless children in Machakos, Kenya". Stockman subsequently became one of the fund's directors.

In 2009, Stockman won the William Brewster Styles Award. The award was given by the Scripps Howard Foundation and accompanied by $10,000. Stockman's award was "for identifying U.S. corporations that were covertly using international relationships and offshore operations to avoid taxes, side-step U.S. laws and deny workers' rights."

In 2014, at the annual meeting of the Association of Opinion Journalists in Mobile, Stockman received The Eugene C. Pulliam Fellowship for Editorial Writing, presented by the Sigma Delta Chi Foundation, the educational arm of the Society of Professional Journalists. It awards $75,000 each year to an outstanding editorial writer or columnist to help broaden his or her journalistic horizons and knowledge of the world. Stockman was writing a study of race relations, especially in Boston, riven by the 1974 court order to bus students to address de facto segregation in the schools.

In 2016, Stockman was awarded the Pulitzer Prize for Commentary, in recognition of a series of articles examining the effects of busing on Boston schools.

== Personal life ==
Stockman resides in Cambridge, Massachusetts, with her husband, Gene Corbin, a lecturer in Civic Studies at Tufts University and the former Dean for Public Service at Harvard University, and their child.
