= Jitegemee =

Charity based in Kenya

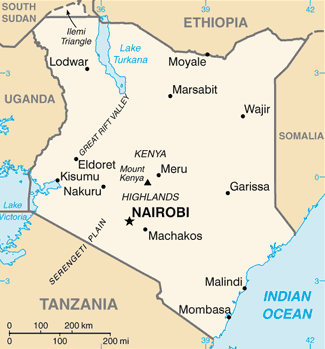
Kenya

Jitegemee is a Kenyan NGO created for the purpose of aiding street children in Machakos, Kenya. Jitegemee was founded in 2003 by Farah Stockman and Alex Mutiso, and has been supported since by grants and contributions. It is overseen by a U.S. NGO, Jitegemee USA. Jitegemee means "sustain yourself" in Swahili and the program focuses on giving the street children the training and means necessary to become self-sustaining. Their work is ongoing and relatively successful insofar as around 130 children (as of May 2008) are participating in one of the programs Jitegemee has established. Common alternate paths for such children on the streets of Machakos include prostitution, drug-addiction, crime, and unskilled labor producing very little income.

== Practice ==
Kenyan law requires that children in grades 1-8 attend free primary school, so for this age group Jitegemee provides food as well as money for concerns such as books and uniforms. After completion of primary school, children with interest and sufficient grades can elect to attend high school (referred to as secondary school). Children lacking the grades or desire to attend high school can participate in Jitegemee's vocational program. For secondary school children, Jitegemee continues to provide food and expenses as well as school tuition. For the vocational program enrollees, they teach classes on how to be a productive employee or mentee, and then help the kids find mentors in one of a handful of local trades ranging from hair-dressing to welding. Jitegemee has also worked to foster relationships between youth in the United States and their students.
