= The Width of Waters =

1959 novel by Alfred Kern

- First edition
- Author: Alfred Kern
- Language: English
- Publisher: Houghton Mifflin
- Publication date: 1959 (©1958)
- Publication place: United States
- Media type: Print (hardback)
- Pages: 266 pp
- OCLC: 3714241
- Followed by: Made in U.S.A.

The Width of Waters is a novel by the American writer Alfred Kern.

The story is set in 1953 in Buchanan, Pennsylvania (a fictionalized Meadville, north of Pittsburgh). The town is celebrating its sesquicentennial and Jack Gaitz, a young public relations man, is in charge of the festivities, all in the shadow of the Korean War as well as that of the Wolfe family, owners of the textile mill that is Buchanan's sole industry.
