= The Trial of Martin Ross =

1971 novel by Alfred Kern

- First edition
- Author: Alfred Kern
- Language: English
- Genre: Novel
- Publisher: W.W. Norton & Company
- Publication date: 1971
- Publication place: United States
- Media type: Print (hardback)
- Pages: 222 pp
- ISBN: 0-393-08637-2
- OCLC: 138122
- Dewey Decimal: 813/.5/4
- LC Class: PZ4.K4 Tr PS3561.E57
- Preceded by: Made in U.S.A.

The Trial of Martin Ross is a novel by the American writer Alfred Kern.

It is set in the late 1960s over Thanksgiving weekend in Buchanan, Pennsylvania (a fictionalized Meadville, north of Pittsburgh). Martin Ross and his wife Janet celebrate the holiday alone and for the first time without their three children, now grown. As a storm dumps a heavy snow, Ross, a liberal lawyer in a conservative town, reads the proofs of his son's first novel, set in a fictionalized Buchanan. Quickly he realizes the novel is an indictment of himself and his life's work, and he struggles to defend himself to his son across the generational chasm.
