= Made in U.S.A. (novel) =

1966 novel by Alfred Kern

- Author: Alfred Kern
- Language: English
- Genre: Novel
- Publisher: Houghton Mifflin Company
- Publication date: 1966
- Publication place: United States
- Media type: Print (hardback)
- Pages: 369 pp
- OCLC: 730054
- Preceded by: The Width of Waters
- Followed by: The Trial of Martin Ross

Made in U.S.A. is a novel by the American writer Alfred Kern.

The story is set in the 1960s in Braden, Pennsylvania, a fictional mill town north of Pittsburgh. Protagonist Steve Hamner is a successful trade unionist for the fictional United Ore and Metal Workers, AFL-CIO. He meets Paula Montefiore, a displaced intellectual from a Kafkaesque Eastern Europe, who is seeking to make a new life in the United States. The two characters confront each other about the meaning of the American dream.
