= Red Letter Day (band) =

British punk rock band

- Origin: Portsmouth, England
- Genre: Punk rock
- Years active: 1984–2009, 2021-
- Labels: Released Emotions, Zip
- Members: Ade Oakley; Daryn Price; Davie Egan; Micky Jeffery; Ray 'Razor' Fagan
- Past members: Ian Campbell; Pete White; Brian Lee; Keith Metcalfe; Steve Hunt; Martin 'Wolfie' Woolf; Chris Perrin; Steve Marsh; Lisa Harvey; Paul 'Pablo' Farrow; Dave Roberts; Johnny Guitar

Red Letter Day are a British punk rock band formed in Portsmouth in 1984.

== History ==
The band's original lineup was Ade Oakley (vocals, guitar), Ian Campbell (guitar), Pete White (bass guitar) and Brian Lee (drums), although after recording two demos, this line up ended and Oakley recruited Davie Egan (guitar), Keith Metcalfe (bass), and Daryn Price (drums).

After their debut gigs, a six-track demo was recorded and sent to various venues resulting in the band's first major support slot with the Angelic Upstarts in Oldham. The band continued gigging during 1985 and recorded "Wherever You May Run" and "Suzie's Bombed Out Tonight" which was released as a self financed single in October. The single received airplay from John Peel and Janice Long resulting in a distribution deal with Revolver Records and a subsequent repress. Four songs were recorded for a BBC Radio 1 John Peel session in April 1986 and its two broadcasts secured the band a deal with Quiet Records who released the "Released Emotions" 12" EP in September with a twelve date UK tour to promote it.Keith left at the end of 1986 and as a temporary replacement Mickey Jeffery performed bass duties on the second and final Quiet release "Take Me In Your Arms", released June 1987 to another enthusiastic response from Janice Long.

Former Original Mirrors bassist Steve Hunt was recruited on bass in March 1987 and played his first show with the Day at the 100 Club. The band then embarked on their first European adventure, appearing at the Polderock Festival in Belgium alongside The Mission, Sonic Youth and The Primitives. In the latter part of 1987 the band recorded five tracks for a shared album with The Sect from Birmingham entitled Soft Lights and Loud Guitars which came out in June 1988 on the Released Emotions label which understandably caused a fair amount of confusion all round. Also in 1988 The Day recorded Great Wall Of Leicester and 23:23 for Link Records to be released on the Underground Rockers compilation featuring Mega City 4, The Crack and many others. Davie Egan left the group at the end of 1988 and the band had to wait until the following February to secure the talents of Ray 'Razor' Fagan, a guitarist whose songwriting and playing style were to completely reshape the band. Although Razor was raring to go RLD were committed to two Belgian dates in February before he was ready so Davie found himself recommissioned for the shows.

Released Emotions released the double A-side single Last Night and Streetheat in August 1989, receiving John Peel airplay and good reviews in the press. Razor played his first date abroad with the band in Belgium in July 1990 followed by a September/October tour of the old East Germany, the band actually being in Germany for the reunification. On their return Released Emotions wanted an album so during December 1990 and January 1991 More Songs About Love And War was recorded in Brighton. Arguably the band's first album, it received some splendid reviews and later in 1991 the band recorded Straight To Hell for Released Emotion's tribute album to The Clash.

In February 1992 Red Letter Day toured the Bohemian region of the old Czechoslovakia and Germany after which Steve Hunt called it a day to be replaced by Martin 'Wolfie' Woolf in June. A week after informing the new member that he had got the job, the band had a gig booked in Fulham so Razor switched to bass for the night and once again Davie found his draft papers on the mat. The new line up, which was to last for the next nine years, was eventually unveiled at Uxbridge in August, a great night also featuring Big Boy Tomato and The Price which was followed by the recording of the band's fifth single Stop The World for Incognito Records of Germany.

May 1993 saw The Day undertake a three-week tour of Czech Republic and Slovakia after which ANK Records offered them an album deal to be recorded next time the band were to tour Czech. The year also saw some sound domestic shows at places such as The Venue and Brentwood Castle. RLD returned to Czech Republic and Slovakia in 1994, a twelve date tour climaxing with four hectic days in the studio to record the Nothing At This Moment In Time CD. The remainder of 1994 was taken up playing around the UK including a debut performance at the Marquee. In November the band received some copies of the Czech CD for the UK market with requests to return to Czech in the New Year to promote the album.

January 1995 saw The Day back in the Czech Republic and Slovakia once more with a show in Stuttgart, Germany en route. A very successful tour resulted in the band being invited back to tour in September of the same year. Daryn could not make it so a friend of Wolfie's, Van, stepped in and immediately endeared himself to the punters with his energetic stage performances. English shows were looking up as The Day played their biggest gig to date at the Portsmouth Music Festival in August on Southsea Common, in front of ten thousand people along with Swervedriver and Buzzcocks. The rest of 1995 was spent gigging and recording demos.

January 1996 found the band back at their favourite studio in Brighton recording Insomnia and Rain for a double A-side single released in August on the Portsmouth label, Mouthy. Back to Czech Republic in May and June plus UK dates including a repeat Portsmouth Music Festival appearance in August, this time supporting The Damned. On returning to England from Czech the band were approached to write and record a song for Czech footy team, FK Teplice, as the Day had played at the club's party to celebrate their promotion to the Czech First League. Hey! Anastasia was re-recorded with suitable lyrics and is now played at Teplice's home games when the team runs out

1997 saw UK dates and another tour of Czech Republic with one German date added in addition to two French dates with Czech group Squad 96. Sadly there was no Portsmouth Music Festival on Southsea Common but local promoter, Roland Woods, saw the gap and with unbelievable determination managed to promote a Music In The Square Festival right in the heart of the City at which The Day played a successful afternoon set. In October RLD signed a years recording contract with Holier Than Thou Records.

The Day kicked off 1998 with shows in Portsmouth and London prior to recording their new album, Lethal, at Outhouse Studio, Reading, in February. The band played a sell-out show at the Wedgewood Rooms, Portsmouth in April and returned to the same venue in July to play with The Vibrators to launch the Lethal album. The rest of the year was spent playing gigs around England and Scotland in support of the album.

1999 started with the Day playing some UK shows prior to their eighth tour of the Czech Republic in May. The band then recorded their new single the topical Happy New Year. The Happy New Year EP was launched at the Air Balloon in Portsmouth with The Vibrators again on the bill. Also on the single was a copy of the Blitz song I Don't Need You which also featured on the Blitz tribute album released by Plastic Head. Pulped magazine contacted the band with a wish to give copies of the single away with their first issue of 2000. Needless to say the band readily agreed and the magazine eventually came out in February 2000 with the RLD CD proudly on the front cover. Happy New Year also featured on Elastic Fiction Record's Original Aspect Ratio, an album showcasing music from the South Of England.

In mid-2000, the band signed to American label Zip Records who gave the band scope to release their best of CD Chance Meetings, which featured liner notes from punk legend Charlie Harper. The CD was released to home-town fans at a launch gig in December 2000. Zip Records also intended to finance a follow up single of entirely new material from the band at the start of 2002. However, in November 2001, Razor and Wolfie decided to leave the band to pursue a new musical project, the first change in Red Letter Day personnel in 9 years. For the Christmas show with The Vibrators and a north-eastern mini-tour in February 2002, Chris Perrin and Steve Marsh from old friends Thirst were drafted in to temporarily fill the vacant positions.

Prior to the north east dates Ade and Daryn sounded out Chris and Steve about the possibility of them joining the Day part-time but on a permanent basis obviously allowing for their Thirst commitments. The boys readily agreed and the new line up played three shows in Newcastle, Sunderland and Hartlepool. March saw a performance at a sold out Wedgewood Rooms supporting Stiff Little Fingers as well as shows in Cambridge and Southampton. In May the band recorded three songs which were dispatched to Zip Records, America, who consequently re-signed the band. The Day continued to play sporadic gigs in England, with the highlight a November date with the UK Subs at the Peel, Kingston, where they impressed a highly partisan crowd. The following night the Day played a very contrasting show, an acoustic evening at Wedgewood Rooms.

The Day began 2003 with a string of dates with Northampton band The Mispelt in Bedford, Northampton and Portsmouth, culminating with the two bands performances at The Punkaid Festival, Brixham, Devon in April. In February the band recorded Limo Life at Blacksmiths Studios, Portsmouth to feature on the UK Subs tribute album. Six RLD tracks were featured on the soundtracks to two MTV shows, Fraternity Life and Sorority Life, mainly Wherever You May Run.

Nettle Red Letter Day's eighth single was released and 'Ramraid' from the four track EP received extensive airplay on digital radio station Radio Storm. Zip records requested a full album from the band for 2004. September saw a couple of shows in Southampton and Ryde on the Isle Of Wight. This was followed in November by a show in Winchester and the Day's 20th Anniversary gig with The Vibrators at The Wedgewood Rooms. In the first week of 2005 The Day completed the recording of Everything Matters at Outhouse Studios, Reading. In June Steve announced he was leaving the band so Jim from Chris Perrins's Zuma project stepped in to play the hometown album launch show in September prior to the worldwide release of Everything Matters in October.

Lisa Harvey joined as The Day's new bass player and played her first shows with the band in February/March 2006. The Day were rocked yet again not long after, this time by Chris Perrin's departure to concentrate fully on his Zuma project. Paul 'Pablo' Farrow auditioned on guitar and immediately joined in late March and the new line-up played a stunning hometown show in July, prior to the birth of Pablo's daughter (which had already been arranged!). Consequently, Chris stepped back in to play shows in West Drayton and Northampton at the end of July prior to Pablo re-taking up the reins.

The band recorded of a three track demo in late February 2007 but by the end of April, irreconcilable differences had surfaced within the band, potentially bringing an end to the group. Chris and Steve Marsh then expressed a wish to raise The Day again in July 2007 resulting in two shows and two live radio sessions before Steve left again in April 2008.

Another doomed attempt to refloat The Day crashed onto the rocks when Johnny Guitar and Dave Roberts joined in September 2008. Only eight days after the recording of new song 'Our Streets', Johnny Guitar decided to leave. Red Letter Day did not record or gig between 2008 and 2021.

In October 2021, Red Letter Day announced that a recording session had been booked for November, involving Ade, Daryn, Davie Egan and Micky Jeffrey with gigs potentially to follow.

The first of the new recordings, 'Student Room' was debuted in December 2021 with the news that this was to form part of a forthcoming album

Recordings were undertaken between 2001 and April 2023 leading to the first album in 18 years 'Sacred Planet'

Ray (Razor) returned after 24 years to bolster the guitar attack in 2025. This five strong line up released the EP 'From The Shadows' in May 2026.

== Discography ==
=== Albums ===
- Soft Lights and Loud Guitars (1988), Released Emotions - split with The Sect
- More Songs About Love and War (1991), Released Emotions
- Nothing at This Moment in Time (1995), Ank
- Lethal (1998), Holier Than Thou
- Everything Matters (2005), Zip
- Sacred Planet? (2023), Only Fit For The Bin

Compilations

- Chance Meetings: The Best of Red Letter Day 1985-1999 (2001), Zip

=== Singles, EPs ===
- "Wherever You May Run" (1986), Lost Generation
- Released Emotions EP (1986), Quiet
- "Take Me In Your Arms" (1987), Quiet
- "Last Night" (1989), Released Emotions
- "Stop the World" (1993), Incognito
- "Insomnia" (1997), Mouthy
- "Happy New Year" (1999), Mouthy
- "Nettle" (2003), Zip
- "From The Shadows" (2026), Only Fit For The Bin
