= Urban Vocal Group =

The Urban Vocal Group
- The Urban Vocal Group logo, Used 2008 - 2021
- Abbreviation: UVG
- Formation: 2007; 19 years ago As a non-profit organisation 2008; 18 years ago As a registered charity 2021; 5 years ago Merged With Guildhall Trust
- Founders: Charlie Fletcher; Amba Tremain
- Type: Charitable organisation (HMRC exemption status)
- Headquarters: Portsmouth Guildhall, United Kingdom
- Region served: City of Portsmouth Havant
- Key people: Sally Stanton; UVG Co-Ordinator, Music Leader, Singing & Vocal Health Specialist (2008 - Present); Jodie Vinall; Music Leader; Lois Bibbins; Music Leader (Havant Group - 2023 - Present); Justine Taylor; Music Leader (Portsmouth Group - 2023 - Present) Previous Key People: Gary Dickens (Formerly); Chairman; Charlie Fletcher (Formerly) co-founder, co-chair & administrative director (2007-2023); Amba Tremain (Formerly) co-founder & musical teacher/director (2007-2021); Kate Gildea (Formerly); Music Leader (Portsmouth) (2018-2022); Olivia Haggarty (Formerly); Music Leader (Havant & Portsmouth); Faye Carpenter (Formerly); Music Leader (Havant & Portsmouth); Ellie Reynolds (Formerly); Music Leader (Havant)
- Website: theuvg.co.uk

The Urban Vocal Group (/ˈʊərbɑːn/, abbreviated to The UVG) is a musical charity headquartered in Portsmouth, Hampshire that specialise in contemporary music performance and education.

The charity has been active in Havant since 2008 and within Portsmouth City since 2014, providing access to music training in the form of group vocals, one to one singing and vocal health tuition, songwriting, composition, and recording, rehearsals and live performances, mentorship and volunteer opportunities as well as public music workshops. The UVG accommodates young people aged 10 to 18, and until early 2023 provided a senior group for older attendees in the Form of AUVG.

UVG began extensive artist development projects in 2015 for younger musicians, which had progressed further in 2016. The UVG celebrated their 10-year anniversary as a registered charity on 14 January 2018 at Portsmouth Guildhall.

In February 2019, the UVG received a grant of £75,000 from Youth Music UK.

== History ==
The Urban Vocal Group was originally established in December 2007 by programmer and musician Charlie Fletcher with the assistance of fellow singer-songwriter Amba Tremain, and Singing & Voice Specialist Sally Stanton. Initially, the charity was created in the effort to form a diverse community of young people from the Havant and City of Portsmouth area, by teaching them the musical abilities they would find in a like-minded environment, which would potentially be beneficial toward young people if they decide upon a profession in the music industry.

In 2014, the group received a £53,000 grant by The Department for Digital, Culture, Media & Sport through their representative division, The National Foundation for Youth Music, allowing the charity to expand their quota, including the area served from their initial Havant-based 30-seat venue to larger venues at Portsmouth Guildhall from September 2014, which helped to accommodate for higher attendance rates. The grant also enabled the charity to increase their artists development activities in 2015, with an additional grant of £14,600 from the Arts Council England in 2016.

Also in 2014, the UVG formed the Adult Urban Vocal Group (or AUVG for short) to serve as a transition group for singers who previously attended the younger groups, and to allow adults to experience the UVG sound for themselves whilst also generating income for the charity.

In April 2021 the charity merged with The Guildhall Trust and began a new chapter in its history. ‌

=== Performances ===
The Urban Vocal Group have performed at venues such as The House of Commons, New Theatre Royal, BBC Radio Solent and notably at the Kings Theatre, guesting with BRIT Award-winning vocal group BLAKE, as well as with singer-songwriter Chesney Hawkes at Portsmouth Guildhall in July 2016, before performing there alone in January 2018 for their tenth annual show. The UVG also sold-out the 500-seat venue Portsmouth Pyramids Centre, for their annual show on 4 December 2016, accompanied by singer-songwriter Marley Blandford and youth streetdance group, Most Wanted. The group have also performed at events such as at Britain's Got Talent auditions in Churchill Square, Brighton as well as the one-off Portsmouth Summer Show in 2016, Southsea Bandstand and Victorious Festival in 2016, 2017 and 2018.

Other venues include the following:

- The Wedgewood Rooms
- Fort Nelson
- Southsea Castle
- Spinnaker Tower
- Portsmouth Historic Dockyard
- Havant Plaza
- South Parade Pier
- Portsmouth Pyramids Centre

== Awards ==
In early 2017, the UVG received the Cultural Partnership Award at the annual Shaping Portsmouth Conference.

Also, in January 2018, they received the Special Recognition Award at The Portsmouth News' Guide Awards ceremony.

Year	Nominee / work	Award	Result
2017	The Urban Vocal Group	Cultural Partnership Award	Won
2018	The Urban Vocal Group	Special Recognition Award	Won
