= Made in America (2013 film) =

2013 film

- Film poster
- Directed by: Ron Howard
- Produced by: Ron Howard; Brian Grazer
- Cinematography: Salvatore Totino
- Edited by: Joshua L. Pearson
- Music by: Dražen Bošnjak
- Production companies: Imagine Entertainment; Participant Media; RadicalMedia
- Distributed by: Phase 4 Films (USA); The Exchange (International)
- Release dates: September 7, 2013 (TIFF); October 11, 2013 (US)
- Running time: 90 minutes
- Country: United States
- Language: English

Made in America is a 2013 American documentary film directed by Ron Howard, about the music festival of the same name founded by Jay-Z. It was screened in the Mavericks section at the 2013 Toronto International Film Festival. Howard said the festival documentary will be "a reflection of the fabric of what it means to be 'Made in America'—what the festival represents, why Jay is doing it and how he relates to each artist." The documentary features performances from Pearl Jam, Odd Future, Dirty Projectors, Skrillex, Santigold, Janelle Monáe, and Run-DMC.
