= American Made (book) =

2021 non-fiction book by Farah Stockman

American Made: What Happens to People When Work Disappears
- Author: Farah Stockman
- Language: English
- Publisher: Random House
- Publication date: October 12, 2021
- Publication place: United States
- Pages: 432
- ISBN: 1984801163
- OCLC: 1284827898

American Made: What Happens to People When Work Disappears is a 2021 non-fiction book by Farah Stockman that focused on Rexnord ball-bearing factory workers whose fate and jobs were uncertain following an announcement of the factory's closure. Stockman explored the overlay between blue collar workers, rural America and 2016 Trump voters and how the economy, political decisions and eventually COVID-19 impacted their job security. The book went into further exploration of race, gender, and social justice issues, and in the case of one employee, prior factory relocations that impacted his financial well-being.

The book followed earlier writing by Stockman on this topic for the New York Times, who sent her to Indiana to cover the follow-up to President Trump's tweet about future factory closures. Over the course of her writing, Stockman met a number of factory workers and ultimately chose to focus on three in American Made: John Feltner, Raleigh (Wally) Hall, and Shannon Mulcahy. While the President's tweet did not stop the jobs from moving, both the tweet and the economic climate which helped pursue some blue collar workers to support Donald Trump's candidacy, had a significant impact on these factory workers.
