= Made in USA =

Country of origin label

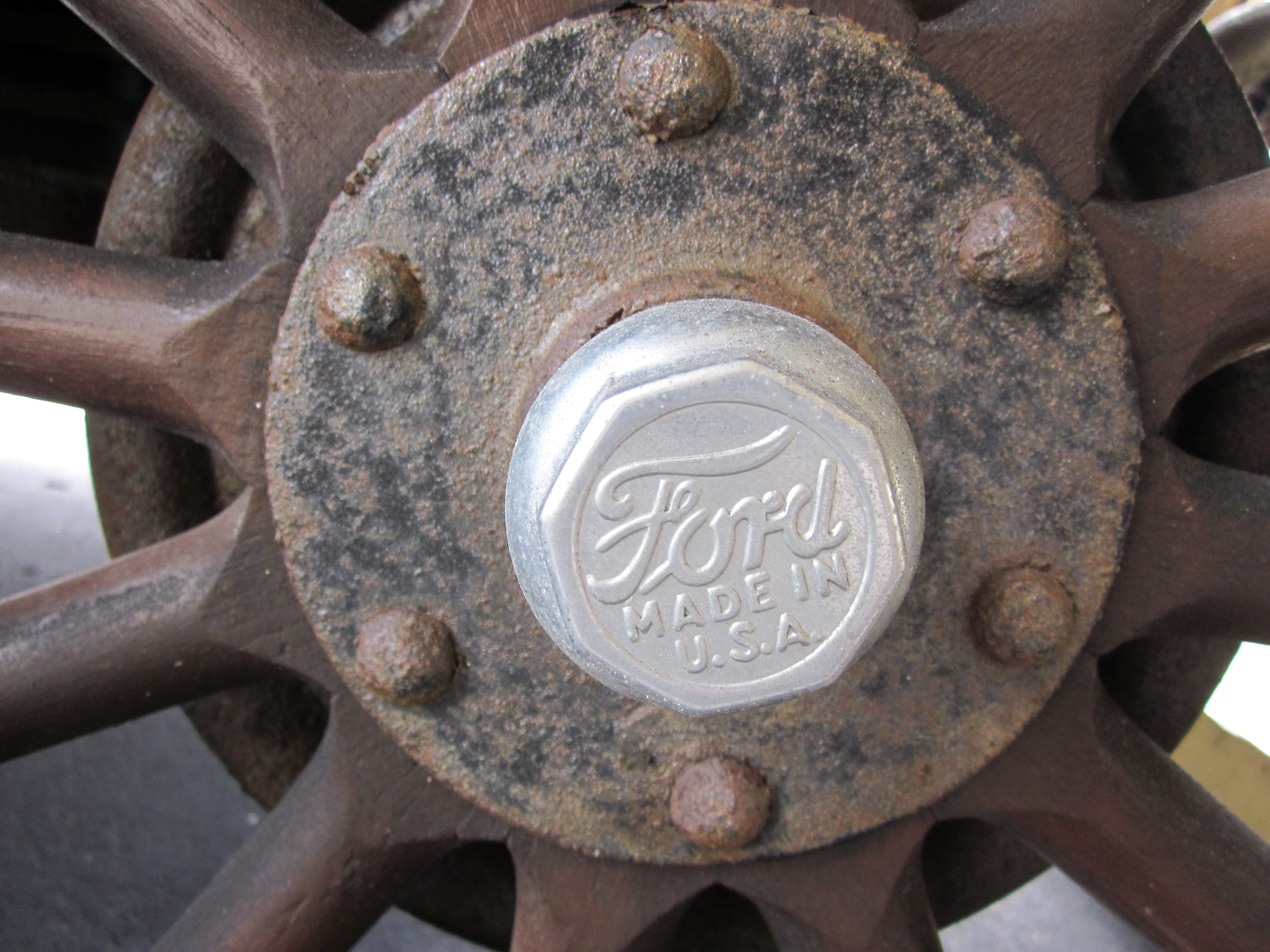
1926 Ford Model T hubcap made in USA

A Made in USA mark is a country of origin label affixed to American-made products that indicates the product is "all or virtually all" domestically produced, manufactured and assembled in the United States. The label is regulated by the Federal Trade Commission (FTC).

In general, goods imported into the United States must have a country of origin label unless exempted, but goods manufactured in the United States can be sold with no origin label unless explicitly required. US-made goods that must bear an origin label include automobiles, textiles, wool, and fur products. Any voluntary claims about the amount of US content in other products must comply with the FTC's Made in USA policy.

A Made in USA claim can be expressed (for example, "American-made") or implied. In identifying implied claims, the Commission focuses on the overall impression of the advertising, label, or promotional material. Depending on the context, US symbols or geographic references (for example, US flags, outlines of US maps, or references to US locations of headquarters or factories) may convey a claim of US origin either by themselves or in conjunction with other phrases or images.

In May 1997, the FTC published its proposal that the requirement be stated as:

It will not be considered a deceptive practice for a marketer to make an unqualified U.S. origin claim if, at the time it makes the claim, the marketer possesses and relies upon competent and reliable evidence that: (1) U.S. manufacturing costs constitute 75% of the manufacturing costs for the product; and (2) the product was last substantially transformed in the United States.

However, this was just a proposal and never became part of the final guidelines published in the Federal Register in 1997.

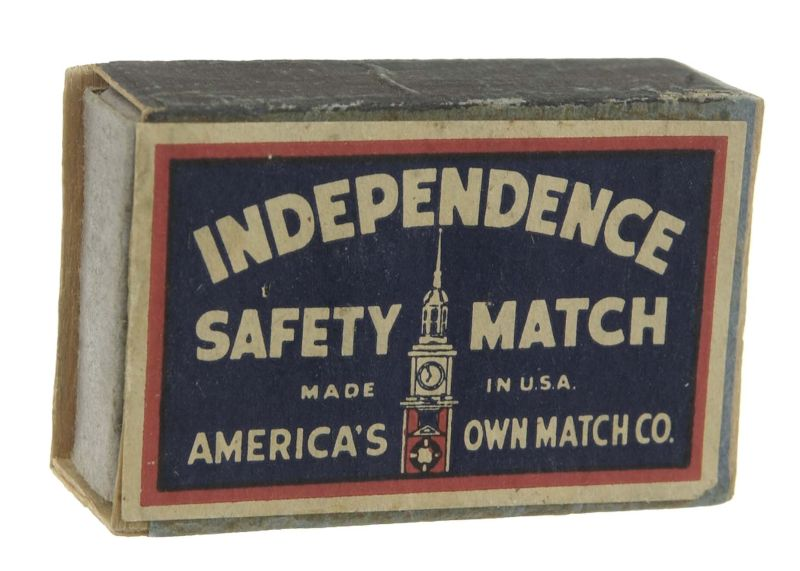
Matchbox

== Assembled in USA ==
A product that includes foreign components may be called "Assembled in USA" without qualification when its principal assembly takes place in the US and the assembly is substantial. For the "assembly" claim to be valid, the product's "last substantial transformation" also should have occurred in the United States. A "screwdriver" assembly in the US of foreign components into a final product at the end of the manufacturing process does not usually qualify for the "Assembled in USA" claim.

== Regulation ==
Country of origin labels are required on textiles, wools, furs, automobiles, most foods, and many other imports.

== Customs fraud ==
Examples of fraudulent practices involving imports include removing a required foreign origin label before the product is even delivered to the ultimate purchaser (with or without the improper substitution of a Made in USA label) and failing to label a product with the required country of origin.

== Significance ==
Many manufacturers use the "Made in USA" label as a selling point with varying degrees of success. This tag is associated with marketing and operational benefits, such as more appeal to certain buyers and lower shipping costs. When an American consumer sees a product is made in the US, the thinking goes, the consumer may perceive it as higher quality than a foreign-made version. The decision where to produce is based on many factors, not simply direct product costs. Marketing and operations are both affected greatly by producing domestically.

=== Marketing significance ===
Many companies highlight the fact a product is made in the US with their branding and marketing campaigns, benefitting from the huge marketing potential, often affecting the success of a product. Country of origin is a typical heuristic used when purchasing, playing a significant role in consumer perception and evaluation since some consumers believe domestic products offer higher value and less risk.

==== Automotive ====
For years, American car brands have used this as a differentiating point. Supporting companies such as Ford was thought of as patriotic. Twenty-eight percent of Americans in 2016 claimed they only would buy American vehicles. There was a large push from domestic automakers after foreign competition entered the market in the 1980s. Ford placed ads to all Americans highlighting that they made quality cars. General Motors and Chrysler also needed to reclaim market share from foreign competitors. It created commercials about American cars that were made by Americans with American parts. In recent years, the trend has changed as Cars.com's 2016 American-Made Index for that year showed that many Hondas and Toyotas are among the top "American-made" automobiles.

==== Apparel ====
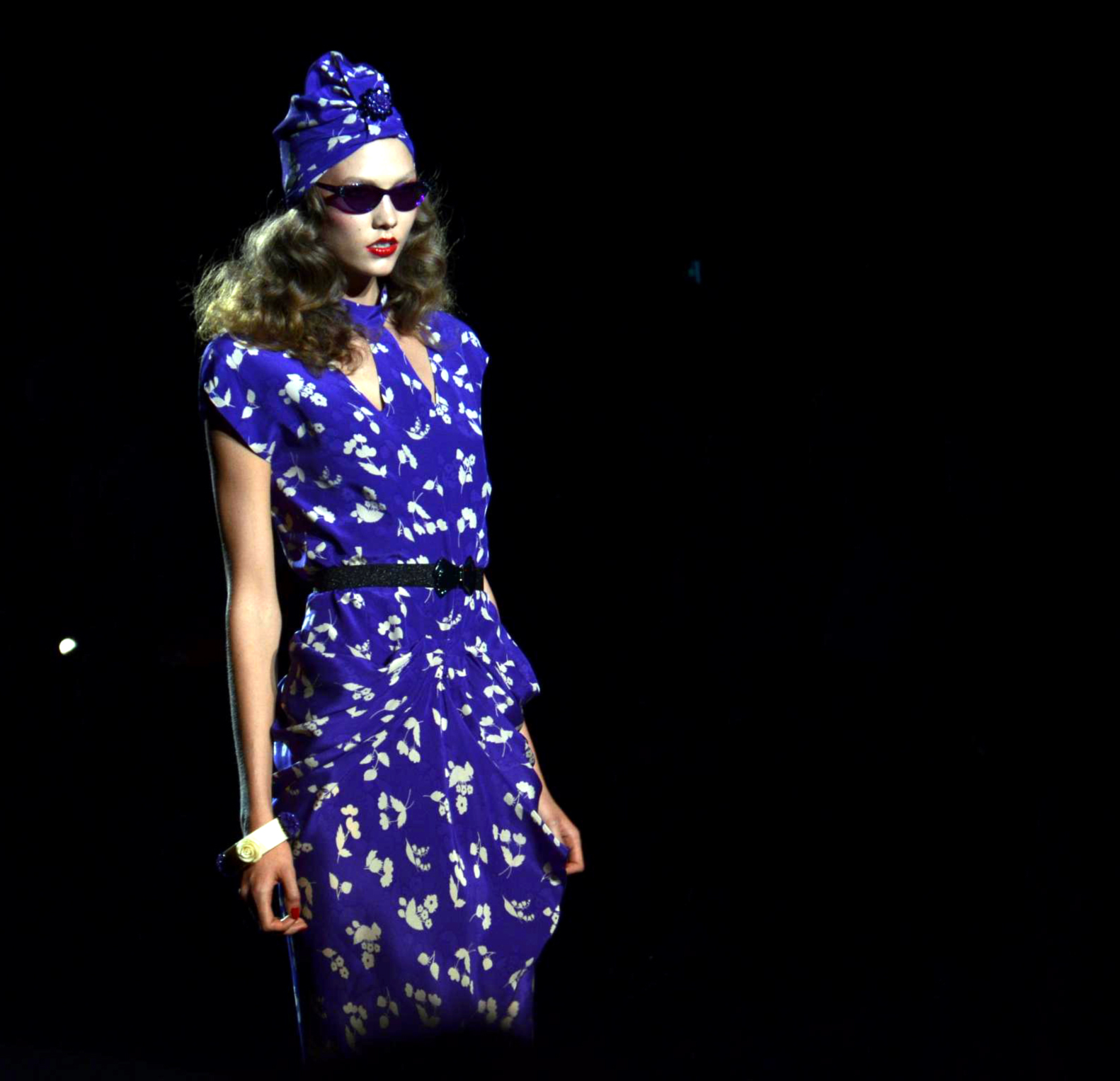
Karlie Kloss showcases an Anna Sui dress at New York Fashion Week, Sui's collections have been designed and manufactured in New York's Garment Center since 1981.

Due to concerns about the exploitation of non-American workers in sweatshops, products bearing a Made in the USA label can appeal to American consumers seeking high-quality products produced domestically under American labor and environmental laws. Until it shut down brick and mortar stores in 2017, American Apparel, which had been producing in Los Angeles since 1989, was the largest garment manufacturer in North America. The company's CEO was committed to social responsibility, and offered factory workers careers with benefits and pay significantly higher than that of their overseas counterparts. When they shuttered, 2,400 employees were left unemployed. After being purchased by Gildan Activewear, American Apparel returned as an online-only retailer with most of its apparel sourced from factories in Central America, primarily Honduras and Nicaragua. Los Angeles Apparel, the new manufacturer, designer, and distributor led by Dov Charney, the former CEO of American Apparel, re-hired 350 employees; Broncs Inc. hired 200 employees; and Zack Hurley, CEO of Indie Source, committed to hiring "at least a few dozen".

==== Food ====
In 2013, after worker protests and bribery investigations, Walmart, the largest grocery store in the world, pledged to source $50 billion in products from the US over the next ten years. Companies such as Tropicana sold their orange juice as being 100% native to Florida. In the late 2000s decade, it started to mix oranges from Brazil, and Florida's Natural saw this as an opportunity to place "Made in the USA" on their cartons. After Tropicana returned to only using Florida oranges several years later, Florida's Natural updated their ads saying "All Florida. Never imported. Who can say that?".

==== Home appliance ====
For over a decade, Whirlpool Corporation was the last American-owned appliance manufacturer that is still operating today. In the early 2000s, the Big Four domestic manufacturers, Whirlpool, General Electric, Maytag (which acquired Amana in 2001), and Electrolux (Frigidaire) captured approximately 99% of market share in the U.S. appliance market. Later in 2002, foreign manufacturers such as LG and Haier began to enter the US, disrupting the market with a flood of imported appliances (such as LG's direct-drive, front-load washers). Increased foreign competition could led to Whirlpool's acquisition of Maytag in 2006, and Haier's acquisition of GE's appliance division in 2016. As Asian brands took significant volume away from American mainstays, Whirlpool petitioned the U.S. government, claiming companies like LG and Samsung were flooding the market with illegally underpriced ("dumped") washing machines.

=== Operational significance ===
Companies that make products in the US also see benefits in their supply chain. Not all benefits are directly seen in cash flows immediately. Aspects like communication are simply improved, which may have effects that are not seen in the short run. The trend towards overseas factories has resulted in complications for companies of all sizes, ranging from quality to timeline issues.

==== Financial ====
Some direct costs are decreased as a result of using domestic factories. Shipping is simpler and faster when there is no need to deal with customs. US factories offer more flexible production runs, which can be appealing to new companies or new products. These offer prices and quantities closer to what companies require. Research shows that reduced tariff rates are reflected immediately in lower clothing prices. This suggests that the price of an imported good directly includes the tariff paid to import it. By producing in the US, this price increase is avoided.

==== Non-financial ====
Companies also benefit from non-direct cost ways of making in the US. The US has the most productive workforce. Costs are higher for these factories but the workers are more effective than their abroad counterparts. China historically was a cheap place to manufacture. This led to the thriving apparel factories. As currency appreciates and wages rise, people are moving to low-cost areas in south-east Asia, and also coming back to the US. China's prices are rising and time to market is becoming increasingly important. Communication is difficult as well for companies that produce in areas where another language is spoken. The general manager of a Haier plant in Camden, South Carolina, Bernie Tymkiw, has been quoted saying, "We just don't have the brainstorming ability because of language." The cultural disconnect can prove to be a significant barrier with global companies.

Supply chains are more agile using local suppliers. There is a greater control over orders. High-end designers like being very close to their factories, as they have full control of the product quality that is leaving the assembly line. This is necessary to keep their high standards. One can visit their factory as often as necessary. This plays an important role in auditing the production process. An online article about the luxury apparel maker company Everlane led to over 2,000 shirts sales in a single day. A shirt restock from China may have taken three months, whereas the company was able to do it in under one month. Being closer to the factory can aid in shipping costs and time.

==== Politics and tariffs ====
Since the early 2020s, "Made in USA" products have gained renewed attention in the United States, particularly after the Trump administration imposed steep tariffs on imports—especially from China—in 2025. Retailers and brands have increasingly used the label as a marketing differentiator, leveraging a surge in customer concern over tariff‑related price hikes to signal both quality and tariff exemption. The trend has increased significantly since 2018. discovery‑oriented searches for phrases like "made in USA products only" on Amazon rose by approximately 220 percent year‑over‑year following the April 2025 tariff escalations, and many brands began prominently including the claim in titles and imagery on over 151,000 listings—generating an estimated $5.1 billion in related sales within weeks. This uptick reflects how trade policy not only reshapes supply chains but also consumer behavior and e‑commerce strategies, even as regulatory agencies such as the Federal Trade Commission have intensified scrutiny of unqualified "Made in USA" claims to ensure compliance with "all or virtually all" domestic sourcing standards.

According to a June 2025 study by The Conference Board, American consumers are losing interest in American-made products. According to the survey, Americans said they were 50 percent likely to buy a favorite American product again, compared to 60 percent in 2022.

== Examples ==
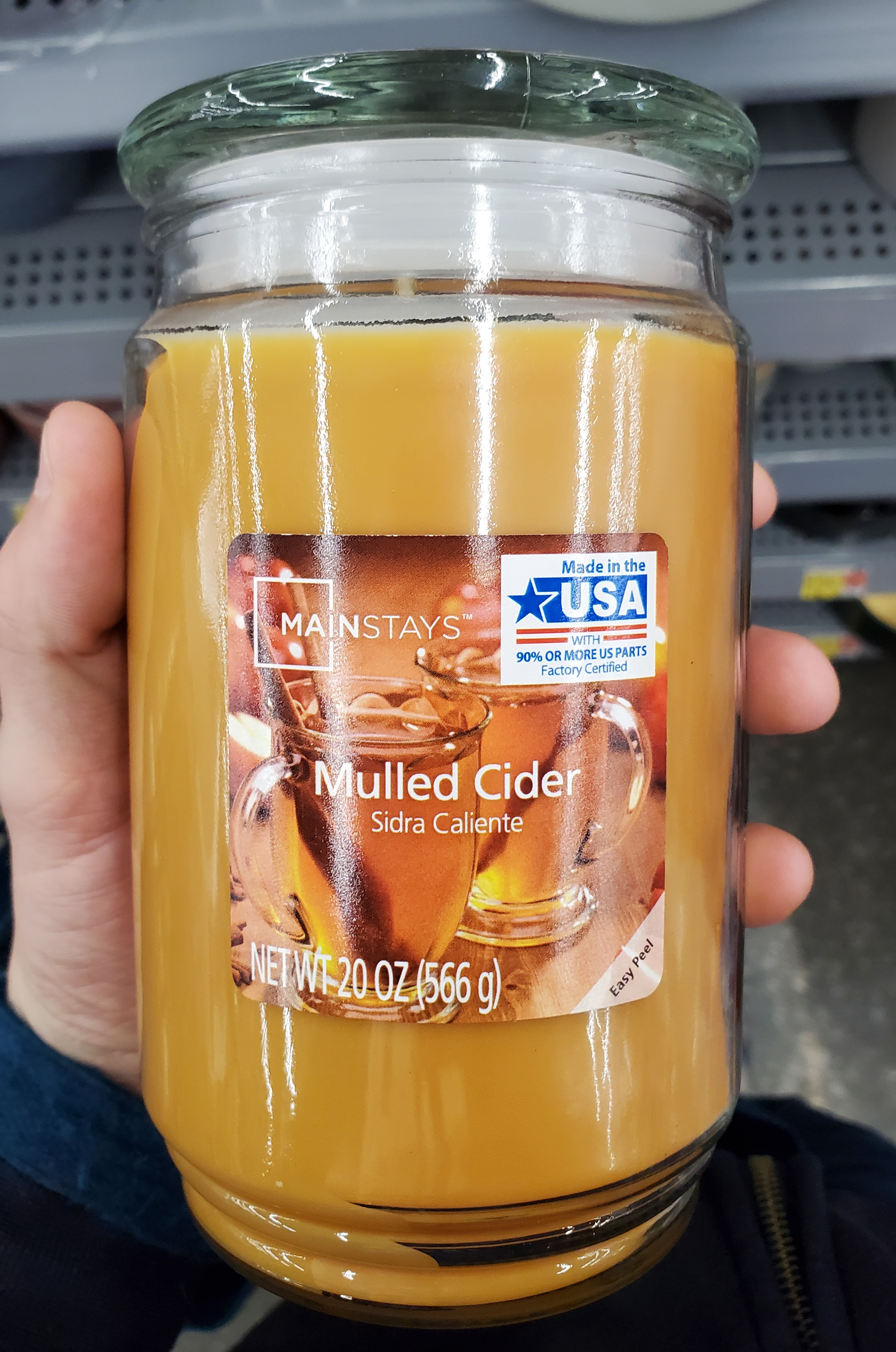
A scented candle with a sticker that says "Made in the USA with 90% or more US parts"

According to the FTC, Made in USA means that "all or virtually all" the product has been made in the United States of America. The product should contain only negligible foreign content. The FTC Enforcement Policy Statement on US Origin Claims says there is no single "bright line" determining what "all or substantially all" means. The minimum requirement is that the final assembly or processing of the product must take place within the United States. Examples are given on the FTC site; a barbecue grill made of components made in the US with the exception of the knobs may be called "Made in USA" while a garden tool with an imported motor may not.

== Controversial use of label ==
Goods produced in American Samoa (a United States territory) are entitled to attach a "Made in USA" label, as this is an insular area of the United States. This area has had few of the labor and safety regulations required of United States employers within the Contiguous United States until recently, and there have been a number of cases of manufacturers using a labor force imported from South and East Asia. The Northern Mariana Islands is another US territory in the Pacific that was exempted from certain US wage and immigration laws until 2007, where the use of the "Made in USA" label was likewise controversial. The label is controversial also since all US insular areas, except Puerto Rico, operate under a customs territory separate from the US, making their products technically imports when sold in the United States proper.

== FTC enforcement ==
In March 2020, the FTC announced a settlement with Williams-Sonoma, Inc. over false advertising claims where Goldtouch Bakeware products, Rejuvenation-branded products, and Pottery Barn Teen and Pottery Barn Kids upholstered furniture products were falsely advertised as Made in the USA. As part of the settlement with the FTC, Williams-Sonoma, Inc. agreed to stop making false, misleading, or unsubstantiated "Made in the USA" claims and is required to pay $1 million to the FTC.

In June 2016, the FTC ordered Shinola Detroit to stop using "Where American is Made" as a slogan as "100% of the cost of materials used to make certain watches is attributable to imported materials". Today, the Ronda movements are made in Bangkok, Thailand. The dials, hands, cases, crystals, and buckles are manufactured in Guangdong, China.

== See also ==
- American nationalism
- Buy American Act
- Country of origin
- Made in America (disambiguation)
- Made in America Festival
- Manufacturing in the United States
- Saipan's Federal Regulation Exemptions
- Swiss Made
