= Wedgewood Rooms =

Coordinates: 50.787°N 1.075°W

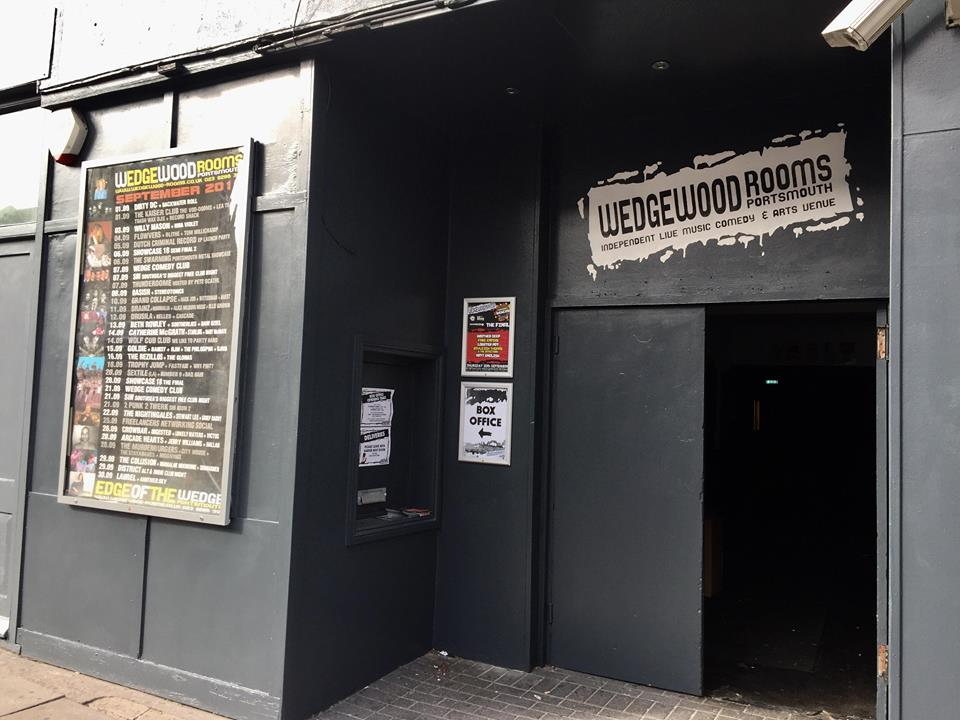
- Interactive map of Wedgewood Rooms
- Location: Portsmouth
- Owner: Wedgewood Rooms
- Capacity: 400

Construction
- Opened: 1992

Website
- www.wedgewood-rooms.co.uk

Wedgewood Rooms is an independent live music venue, in Southsea, Portsmouth, England, which hosts both music and comedy events.

It has a capacity of 400 people, and is located on Albert Road in Southsea. Recently it has hosted events from up-and-coming British pop and rock artists, such as You Me At Six, Kasabian, Mercury Prize winners Klaxons, Travis and English Teacher (band). It has also become a favourite venue for artists wishing to play more intimate venues, such as Renegades and Bowling For Soup, as well as one-off / warm-up shows for many bands, including Damon Albarn and Jamie T.

The Wedgewood Rooms, also known as 'The Wedge' by locals, regularly hosts local band nights. It also holds comedy, club and tribute nights.

The Edge of the Wedge, a smaller venue to the front to the main Wedgewood Rooms, regularly hosts local acts, smaller alternative acts and DJs.

== Performers ==
=== Selected international acts ===
- Albert Hammond Jr.
- Brendan Benson
- Jeff Buckley
- The Brian Jonestown Massacre
- Frank Black
- The Dickies
- Juliette and the Licks
- Kristin Hersh
- The Lemonheads
- Mercury Rev
- Sparklehorse
- Twenty One Pilots
- Vampire Weekend
- Gerard Way - notable for being his first solo show
- CKY
- All Time Low
- Barenaked Ladies
- The Strokes - notable for being their first show in the UK
- The Front Bottoms
- Less Than Jake
- Goldfinger
- Frank Iero and the Patience
- Title Fight

=== Selected British acts ===
- The Jesus & Mary Chain
- Death In Vegas
- Ed Harcourt
- Spiritualized
- PJ Harvey
- Yuck
- The Mission
- VANT
- Black Grape
- Catfish and the Bottlemen
- Urban Vocal Group
- Oasis
- Muse
- Gorillaz
- Kasabian
- Primal Scream
- Biffy Clyro
- Editors
- Damon Albarn
- Buzzcocks
- James
- Feeder (also played under their pseudonym name Renegades in 2010)
- Placebo
- Supergrass
- Razorlight
