= Platino Award for Best Documentary =

Ibero-American film award

- Awarded for: Best Documentary of the Year
- Country: Ibero-America
- Presented by: Entidad de Gestión de Derechos de los Productores Audiovisuales (EGEDA), Federación Iberoamericana de Productores Cinematográficos y Audiovisuales (FIPCA)
- Currently held by: Apocalypse in the Tropics (2026)
- Website: premiosplatino.com

The Platino Award for Best Documentary (Spanish: Premio Platino al mejor película documental) is one of the Platino Awards, Ibero-America's film awards, presented by the Entidad de Gestión de Derechos de los Productores Audiovisuales (EGEDA) and the Federación Iberoamericana de Productores Cinematográficos y Audiovisuales (FIPCA).

== History ==
It was first presented in 2014, with the Spanish documentary Con la pata quebrada being the first recipient of the award. Spain holds the record of most wins in the category with six as well as most nominations with twenty-two, with at least one nominated Spanish film each edition.

Brazilian films The Salt of the Earth (2015) and The Edge of Democracy (2020) and Chilean films The Mole Agent (2021) and The Eternal Memory (2024), all won the Platino Award and have received a nomination for the Academy Award for Best Documentary Feature.

In the list below. the winner of the award for each year is shown first, followed by the other nominees.

== Awards and nominations ==
=== 2010s ===
Year	English title	Original title	Director	Country
2014 (1st)	Con la Pata Quebrada		Diego Galán	Spain
2014 (1st)	Cuates de Australia		Everardo González	Mexico
2014 (1st)	La Eterna Noche de las Doce Lunas		Priscilla Padilla	Colombia; Bolivia
2014 (1st)	O Dia que Durou 21 Anos		Camilo Tavares	Brazil
2014 (1st)	Sigo Siendo (Kachkaniraqmi)		Javier Corcuera	Peru; Spain
2015 (2nd)	The Salt of the Earth	O Sal da Terra	Wim Wenders & Juliano Ribeiro Salgado	Brazil
2015 (2nd)	Who is Dayani Cristal?	¿Quién es Dayani Cristal?	Marc Silver	Mexico
2015 (2nd)	El Vals de los Inútiles		Edison Cájas	Chile; Argentina
2015 (2nd)	Born in Gaza	Nacido en Gaza	Hernán Zin	Spain
2015 (2nd)	Paco de Lucía: La Búsqueda		Francisco Sánchez Varela	Spain
2016 (3rd)	The Pearl Button	El botón de nácar	Patricio Guzmán	Chile; Spain
2016 (3rd)	Chicas Nuevas 24 Horas		Mabel Lozano	Spain; Argentina; Paraguay; Colombia; Peru
2016 (3rd)	Beyond My Grandfather Allende	Allende mi abuelo Allende	Marcia Tambutti Allende	Chile; Mexico
2016 (3rd)	The Propaganda Game		Álvaro Longoria	Spain
2016 (3rd)	Tea Time	La once	Maite Alberdi	Chile
2017 (4th)	Born in Syria	Nacido en Siria	Hernán Zin	Spain
2017 (4th)	Atrapados en Japón		Vivienne Barry	Chile
2017 (4th)	Cinema Novo		Eryk Rocha	Brazil
2017 (4th)	Frágil Equilibrio		Guillermo García López	Spain
2017 (4th)	It All Started at the End	Todo comenzó por el fin	Luis Ospina	Colombia
2018 (5th)
2018 (5th)	Lots of Kids, a Monkey and a Castle	Muchos hijos, un mono y un castillo	Gustavo Salmerón	Spain
2018 (5th)	Ejercicios de Memoria		Paz Encina	Paraguay; Argentina
2018 (5th)	Dancing Beethoven		Arantxa Aguirre	Spain
2018 (5th)	El Pacto de Adriana		Lissette Orozco	Chile
2018 (5th)	The Grown-Ups	Los niños	Maite Alberdi	Chile
2019 (6th)
2019 (6th)	The Silence of Others	El silencio de los otros	Robert Bahar & Almudena Carracedo	Spain
2019 (6th)	Devil's Freedom	La libertad del diablo	Everardo González	Mexico
2019 (6th)	Camarón: Flamenco y Revolución		Alexis Morante	Spain
2019 (6th)	Ruben Blades Is Not My Name	Yo no me llamo Rubén Blades	Abner Benaim	Panama; Argentina; Colombia

=== 2020s ===
Year	English title	Original title	Director	Country
2020 (7th)	The Edge of Democracy	Democracia em Vertigem	Petra Costa	Brazil
2020 (7th)	Ara Malikian: Una Vida Entre las Cuerdas		Nata Moreno	Spain
2020 (7th)	El Cuadro		Andrés Sanz	Spain
2020 (7th)	Historias de Nuestro Cine		Ana Pérez-Lorente & Antonio Resines	Spain
2021 (8th)	The Mole Agent	El agente topo	Maite Alberdi	Chile; Spain
2021 (8th)	Babenco: Tell Me When I Die	Babenco: Alguém Tem que Ouvir o Coração e Dizer Parou	Bárbara Paz	Brazil
2021 (8th)	Cartas Mojadas		Paula Palacios	Spain
2021 (8th)	The Year of the Discovery	El año del descubrimiento	Luis López Carrasco	Spain
2022 (9th)	A Última Floresta		Luiz Bolognesi	Brazil
2022 (9th)	100 Días con La Tata		Miguel Ángel Muñoz	Spain
2022 (9th)	Who's Stopping Us	Quién lo impide	Jonás Trueba	Spain
2022 (9th)	Rita Moreno: Just a Girl Who Decided to Go for It		Mariem Pérez Riera	Puerto Rico
2023 (10th)	The Padilla Affair	El caso Padilla	Pavel Giroud	Cuba; Spain
2023 (10th)	Bosco		Alicia Cano Menoni	Uruguay
2023 (10th)	Eami		Paz Encina	Paraguay; Mexico; Argentina
2023 (10th)	My Imaginary Country	Mi país imaginario	Patricio Guzmán	Chile
2023 (10th)	The Silence of the Mole	El silencio del topo	Anaïs Taracena	Guatemala
2024 (11th)	The Eternal Memory	La memoria infinita	Maite Alberdi	Chile
2024 (11th)	La Memoria del Cine, una Película sobre Fernando Méndez-Leite		Moisés Salama	Spain
2024 (11th)	A Wolfpack Called Ernesto	Una jauría llamada Ernesto	Everardo González	Mexico
2024 (11th)	The Trial	El juicio	Ulises de la Orden	Argentina
2025 (12th)	The Echo	El eco	Tatiana Huezo	Mexico
2025 (12th)	The Flamenco Guitar of Yerai Cortés	La guitarra flamenca de Yerai Cortés	Antón Álvarez	Spain
2025 (12th)	The Lost Children	Los niños perdidos	Orlando von Einsiedel, Lali Houghton	Colombia
2025 (12th)	Reas		Lola Arias	Argentina
2026 (13th)	Apocalypse in the Tropics	Apocalipse nos Trópicos	Petra Costa	Brazil
2026 (13th)	Under the Flags, the Sun	Bajo las banderas, el sol	Juanjo Pereira	Paraguay; Argentina
2026 (13th)	Flores para Antonio		Elena Molina, Isaki Lacuesta	Spain
2026 (13th)	Afternoons of Solitude	Tardes de soledad	Albert Serra	Spain; Portugal

== Awards by nation ==
Country	Awards (as of 2025)	Nominations (as of 2025)
Spain	6	26
Brazil	4	7
Chile	3	10
Mexico	1	7
Cuba	1	1
Argentina	0	8
Colombia	0	5
Peru	0	2
Paraguay	0	4
Bolivia	0	1
Panama	0	1
Puerto Rico	0	1
Uruguay	0	1
Guatemala	0	1
Portugal	0	1

== See also ==
- Goya Award for Best Documentary
- Academy Award for Best Documentary Feature
