= Miguel Lawner =

Chilean architect (born 1928)

- Born: 10 August 1928 (age 98); Santiago, Chile
- Education: University of Chile
- Occupation: Architect
- Notable work: Subsidized housing in Santiago and Valparaíso
- Spouse: Ana María Barrenechea Grünwald
- Children: 2

Miguel Lawner Steiman (born 10 August 1928) is a Chilean architect who has received several national awards—including the National Architecture Award in 2019—for his projects, both in the public and private sectors.

He served as executive director of the Corporation for Urban Improvement (CORMU) during the Popular Unity administration of Salvador Allende, until the 1973 coup d'état led by Augusto Pinochet. Afterwards, he was arrested and imprisoned in various concentration camps until his release and exile in Denmark. Both from abroad and after his return to Chile in the 1980s, Lawner has continued to work in architectural projects with a focus on social interest, as well as investigating and denouncing the human rights violations perpetrated during the dictatorship.

Lawner also served as editorial assistant at AUCA architecture magazine, as national director of the Architects' Association of Chile, and of the NGO Taller de Vivienda Social (a low-income housing workshop).

== Biography ==
=== Early life ===
Miguel was raised in the neighborhood of Matta-Portugal in Santiago, Chile. This is where his parents, Luis and Ana, settled after emigrating to Chile shortly before Miguel's birth, coming from the Ukrainian city of Kamianets-Podilskyi.

When he reached his fourth year of high school, he entered the National Institute. Aterwards, he entered the School of Architecture and Urban Development (FAU) at the University of Chile, from where he graduated in 1954 after having stood out as a student assistant and having participated in the emerging and multifaceted educational reform that started in Chile in the 1950s.

=== Professional activity during the Popular Unity administration ===
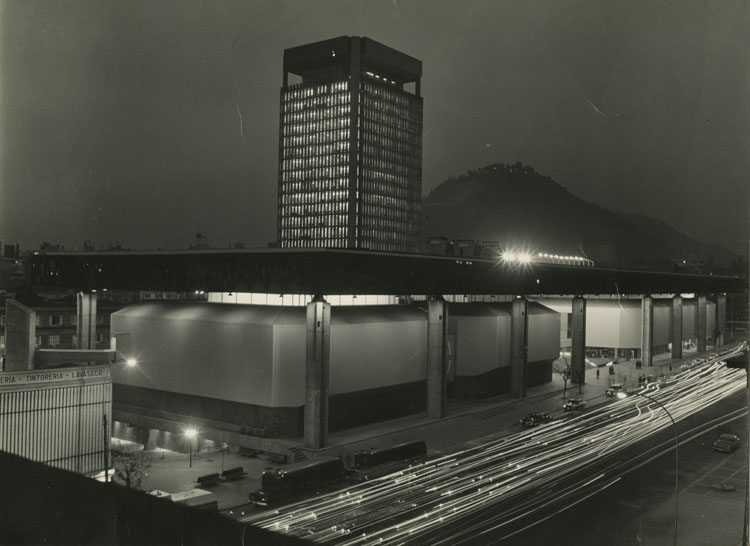
The UNCTAD building after its inauguration in 1972.

After graduating as an architect, he taught at the University of Chile. Together with his wife—Ana María Barrenechea Grünwald—and Francisco Ehijo, they established the architecture firm BEL Arquitectos Ltda., with which they applied for and won several public bids related to the design of social interest housing and public facilities, among other architectural projects. In addition, in 1965 he co-founded AUCA architecture magazine (1965–1986) and served as its editorial assistant.

After Salvador Allende took office as president of Chile in late 1970, he directly appointed Lawner as executive director of the Corporation for Urban Improvement (CORMU). His work during this period included the design and execution of several residential developments in Santiago, such as Villa San Luis (Las Condes) and the CORMUVAL housing project between Santiago and Valparaíso. He also took part in the planning of the building for the UNCTAD III—the third United Nations Conference on Trade and Development—(currently, the Gabriela Mistral Cultural Center); in the International Housing Exhibition (Viexpo); in the remodeling of the blocks adjacent to the North-South Highway, and in the renovation of public parks such as O'Higgins Park and the community pools in San Cristóbal Hill. During his tenure, the CORMU built around 158,000 social housing units.

=== Coup d'état and arrest ===
After the 1973 coup d'état led by Augusto Pinochet, Lawner was arrested and imprisoned at the Military School, where the top leaders of Popular Unity were grouped together. From there, he was sent to the Dawson Island Concentration Camp, located in the Strait of Magellan, where the prisoners were organized in groups, poorly fed, and forced to do hard labor in sub-zero temperatures. Lawner's group was assigned to cut down Guaitecas cypress trees, the trunks of which they later had to transport to be used for installing electric power poles. While carrying out this work, Lawner came across the deteriorated church of Port Harris and convinced the camp commandant that he and his fellow workers could restore it. To design the blueprints for the church and the restoration work, he was provided with pencil and paper, with which he began to practice freehand drawing, a technique he had yet to master. These drawing elements allowed him to keep a visual record of the concentration camps (built in a similar manner to Auschwitz), their perimeters, and the inside of the barracks used as dormitories. To make the scale measurements, he counted his steps and used his hands. After he completed a drawing, he would memorize it and then destroy it so that it would not be confiscated. In March 1974, a parliamentary delegation from the Federal Republic of Germany visited the island and Lawner was able to provide them with 19 drawings that he had managed to preserve. These drawings became a valuable record of the arrests made during the Chilean dictatorship.

After several months, he was transferred from Dawson Island to the Air Force War Academy (AGA), then to the Ritoque concentration camp, and later to the Tres Álamos clandestine prison camp, before finally being exiled to Denmark along with his wife Ana María Barrenechea.

=== Exile in Denmark ===
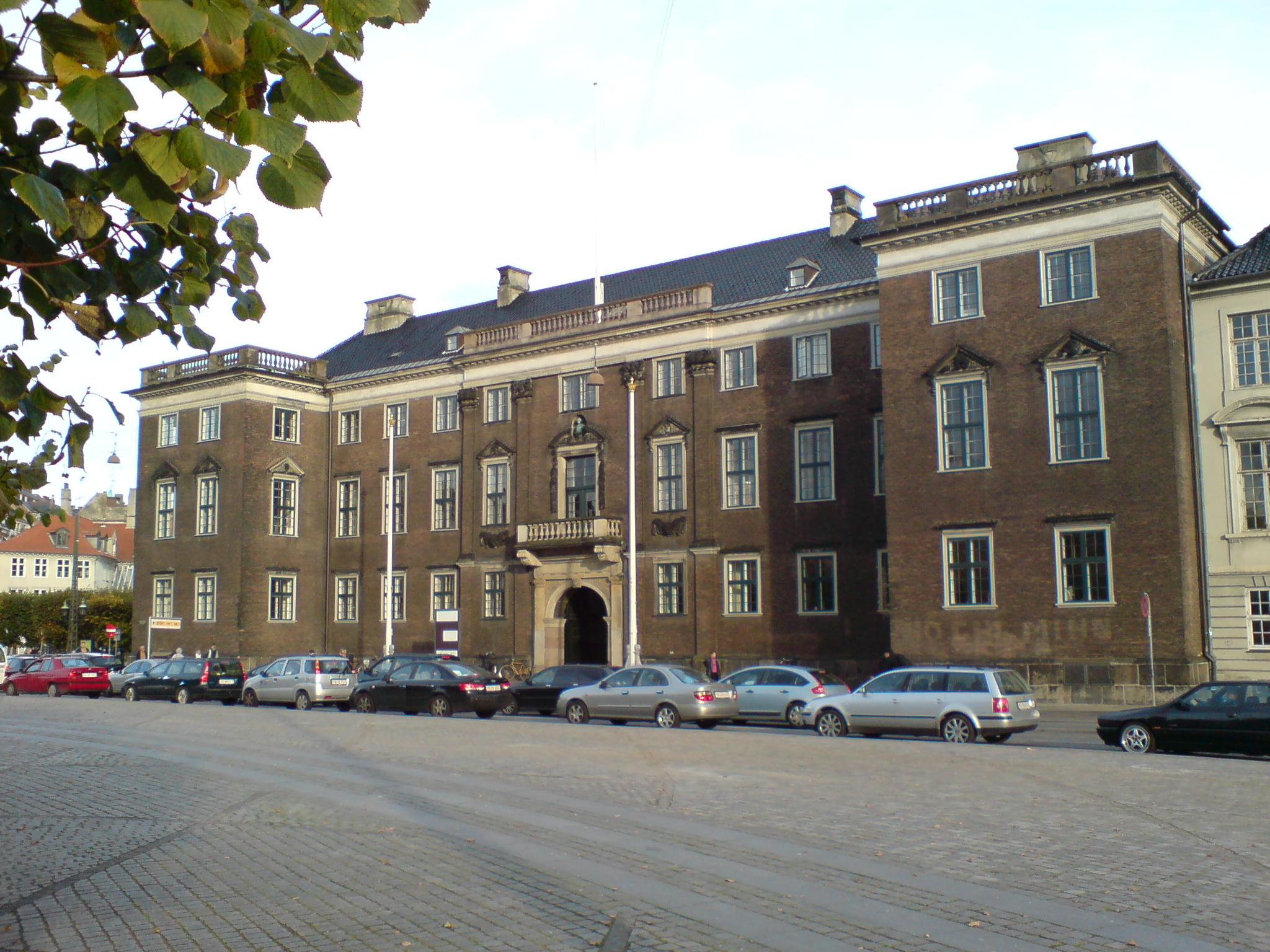
Façade of Charlottenborg Palace, seat of the Royal Danish Academy of Fine Arts.

In Denmark, Lawner got a job as a university professor. In Europe, he taught classes at Goethe University in the Federal Republic of Germany and at the Royal Danish Academy of Fine Arts.

Parallel to his work as professor, he took part in denouncing and expressing solidarity with the victims of human rights violations in Chile. There, he also managed to faithfully reproduce the drawings of the concentration camps of Dawson Island, Ritoque, and Tres Álamos that he had memorized, which he published in 2003 in his book La vida a pesar de todo.

=== Return to Chile ===
Lawner returned to Chile around 1984. In 2006, he was commissioned to remodel the mansion at Avenida República 475 in Santiago, a former detention facility of the National Information Center (CNI) that now houses the Museo de la Solidaridad Salvador Allende. During the remodel, workers found hidden around 20 pages that described the human resources budgets used by the CNI between 1982 and 1983, as well as a book with a sort of theater play that explained to the CNI members, in a playful manner, the warlike relations Chile had with its neighboring countries. Moreover, they also found a directory showing the telephone numbers of the agents who had been planted in various institutions around the country, such as hospitals, banks, courts of justice, shopping malls, and culture centers. After a call was made by the secretary of the Salvador Allende Foundation to Isabel Allende, and from the latter to the government, Secretary General Osvaldo Puccio sent the police to the site. In under an hour, all the materials had been seized and handed over to Hugo Dolmestch, who was then in charge of the CNI trials. Except for a few pages that Lawner managed to photograph, these documents were never publicly disclosed.

His drawings related to his arrest after the coup d'état have been exhibited at the Museo de la Solidaridad Salvador Allende and also in an exhibition inaugurated on 9 December 2010 at the Museum of Memory and Human Rights.

Miguel Lawner served as president of the Alejandro Lipschutz Science Institute (ICAL) between 1984 and 1989 and as director of Taller de Vivienda Social (TVS) between 1984 and 1992.

== Portrayals in documentaries and fiction films ==
The film Dawson Isla 10 was released on 11 September 2009, the anniversary of the 1973 Chilean coup d'état. It was directed by Miguel Littin and tells the story of how Lawner and his companions were imprisoned in Dawson Island. He is portrayed by actor Bertrand Duarte.

The following year, the architect appeared with his wife in Patricio Guzmán's documentary, Nostalgia for the Light, describing how he managed to remember and draw the blueprints of the concentration camps.

In 2016, Lawner also gave his testimony in a documentary film directed by Diego del Pozo about Cantalao, an unfinished project by the poet Pablo Neruda.

== List of works ==
- 1976: Venceremos!: dos años en los campos de concentración (OCLC 3239984)
- 2003: La vida a pesar de todo (OCLC 54545214)
- 2004: Retorno a Dawson (OCLC 57727752)
- 2013: Memorias de un arquitecto obstinado (OCLC 868962661)
- 2019: El barrio Matta-Portugal voces de la ciudad (OCLC 1057336899)

=== Essays ===
- 1991: La remodelación del centro de Santiago (OCLC 37730824)
- 2008: Salvador Allende: presencia en la ausencia (with Hernán Soto and Jacobo Schatan; OCLC 248395190)
- 2011: Orlando Letelier el que lo advirtió: los Chicago Boys en Chile (with Naomi Klein and Hernán Soto; OCLC 819639399)

=== Articles ===
- 1993: Sistematización de proyectos de construcción de segundas etapas de vivienda progresiva: comunas de La Pintana y San Bernardo (with Pedro Escobar and Claudia Trevisan; OCLC 503256309)
- 1999: El Barrio Matta Portugal, in Voces de la ciudad. Historias de barrios de Santiago (OCLC 43422725)
- 2007: El terremoto de Tocopilla, Chile: carta abierta a la Presidenta de la República Dra. Michelle Bachelet, y repercusiones (OCLC 860113943)
- 2010: Chile: una historia milenaria de terremotos y maremotos, in El terremoto social del bicentenario (OCLC 844925054)
- 2010: Carta abierta al Presidente Piñera (OCLC 860361346)
- 2011: Protagonistas, in 275 días: sitio, tiempo, contexto y afecciones específicas (OCLC 794187253)

== Awards and recognitions ==
The following are some of the awards obtained by Miguel Lawner:

- 1994: Alberto Risopatron Award from the Architects' Association of Chile
- 2003: Humanist Architect Award from La República University
- 2010: Architect Claude François Brunet de Baines Medal from the School of Architecture and Urban Development (FAU), University of Chile.
- 2011: Edwin Haramoto Chair Award, from the Housing Institute of the FAU, University of Chile.
- 2013: Honorary Diploma from the School of Architecture of the University of Santiago, Chile (Usach).
- 2016: Conservation Award from the National Monuments Council of Chile
- 2019: National Architecture Award of Chile from the Architects' Association of Chile
- 2023: Honorary Doctorate from the University of Santiago, Chile (Usach)

== See also ==
- Presidency of Salvador Allende
- 1973 Chilean coup d'état
- Military dictatorship of Chile
- Human rights abuses in Chile under Augusto Pinochet
- Dawson Island
- Dawson Isla 10
- National Architecture Award of Chile
- Centro Cultural Gabriela Mistral
- National Information Center (Chile)
- UN Trade and Development III

== Bibliography ==
- Lawner, Miguel (2004). Retorno a Dawson (1st ed.). Santiago, Chile: LOM Ediciones. ISBN 956-282-666-X.
- Lawner, Miguel (2013). Memorias de un arquitecto obstinado (1st ed.). Concepción, Chile: University of the Bío Bío.
