= Goya Award for Best Documentary =

Annual award by the Spanish Film Academy

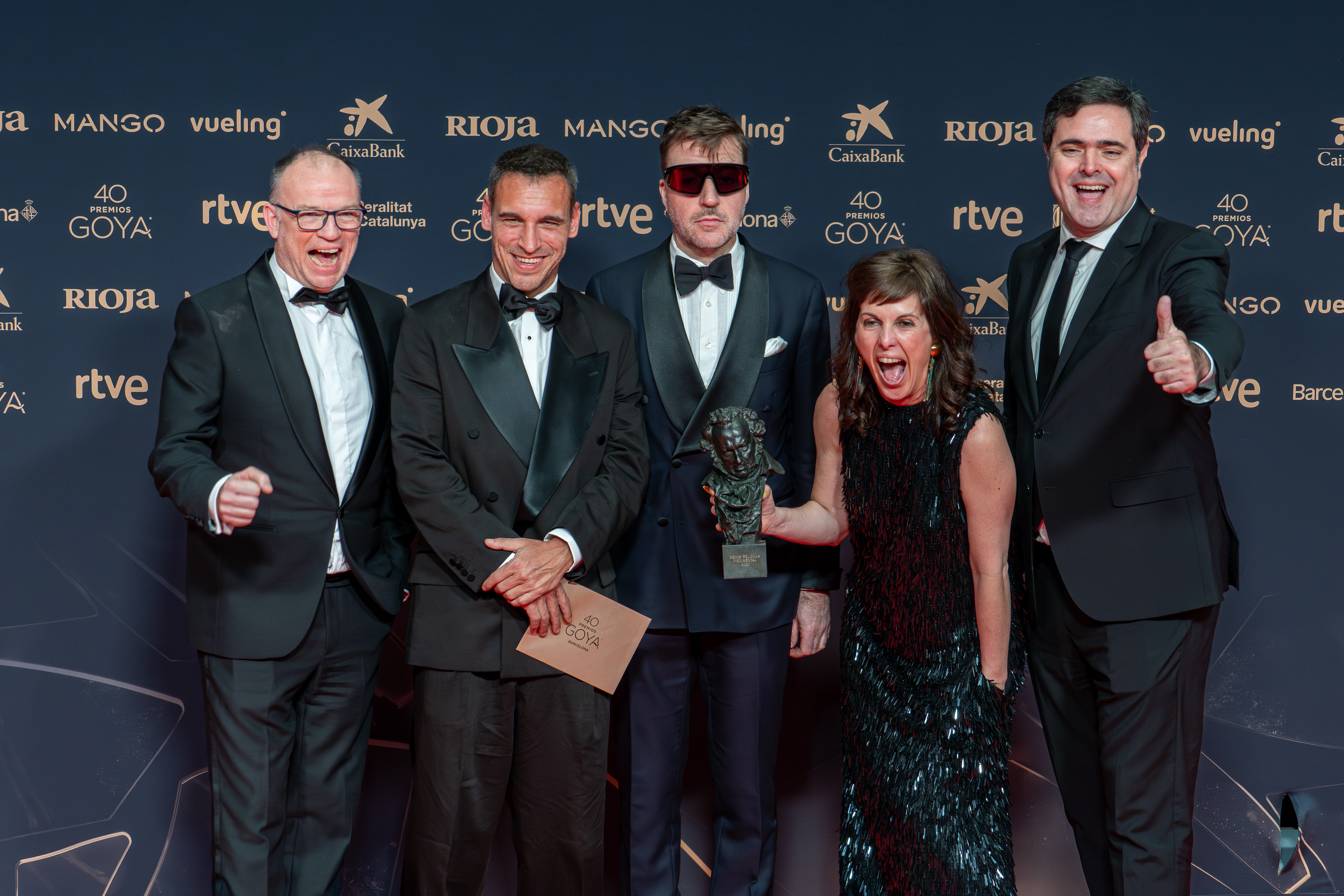
- Team of Afternoons of Solitude, the 2026 winner
- Native name: Premio Goya a la mejor película documental
- Awarded for: Best Spanish documentary film of the year
- Country: Spain
- Presented by: Academy of Cinematographic Arts and Sciences of Spain (AACCE)
- First award: 16th Goya Awards (2001)
- Most recent winner: Afternoons of Solitude (2025)
- Website: Official website

The Goya Award for Best Documentary (Spanish: Premio Goya a la mejor película documental) is one of the Goya Awards presented annually by the Academy of Cinematographic Arts and Sciences of Spain (AACCE) since the 16th edition of the awards in 2001. José Luis Guerín's En construcción was the first winner.

The film Balseros received a nomination for the Academy Award for Best Documentary Feature at the 76th Academy Awards with The Silence of Others (2018) made the shortlist for the same category at the 91st Academy Awards. At the European Film Awards, the films The Basque Ball: Skin Against Stone (2003), Fados (2007) and The Silence of Others (2018) received a nomination for Best Documentary.

== Winners and nominees ==
=== 2000s ===
Year	English title	Original title	Director(s)	Producer(s)
2001 (16th)	En construcción		José Luis Guerín	Ovideo TV
2001 (16th)	Asesinato en febrero		Eterio Ortega Santillana	Elías Querejeta, Mediapro
2001 (16th)	Extranjeros de sí mismos		José Luis López-Linares, Javier Rioyo	Cero en Conducta
2001 (16th)	Los niños de Rusia		Jaime Camino	Tibidabo Films
2002 (17th)	El efecto Iguazú		Pere Joan Ventura	Cre - Acción Films
2002 (17th)	Balseros		Carles Bosch, Josep Maria Domènech	Bausan Films, Televisió de Catalunya
2002 (17th)	De Salamanca a ninguna parte		Chema de la Peña	Artimaña Producciones
2002 (17th)	Winged Migration	Le Peuple Migrateur	Jacques Cluzaud, Michel Debats and Jacques Perrin	Wanda Visión, Galatée Films
2003 (18th)	Un instante en la vida ajena		José Luis López-Linares, Javier Rioyo	Cero en Conducta
2003 (18th)	The Basque Ball: Skin Against Stone	La pelota vasca: la piel contra la piedra	Julio Medem	Alicia Produce
2003 (18th)	Polígono sur: El arte de Las Tres Mil		Dominique Abel	Maestranza Films, Ideale Audience
2003 (18th)	Suite Habana		Fernando Pérez	Wanda Visión, ICAIC
2004 (19th)	El milagro de Candeal		Fernando Trueba	Fernando Trueba, Iberautor Promociones Culturales, S.R.L., B.M.G. Music Spain
2004 (19th)	¡Hay motivo!		Various directors (Note: The documentary ¡Hay motivo! consists in 33 short documentary films each directed by a different director, the directors are Joaquín Oristrell, Pere Portabella, Álvaro del Amo, David Trueba, Gracia Querejeta, Isabel Coixet, José Ángel Rebolledo, Sigfrid Monleón, Icíar Bollaín, Chus Gutiérrez, Víctor Manuel, Pedro Olea, Yolanda García Serrano, Víctor García León, Ana Díez, Bernardo Belzunegui, José Luis Cuerda, Miguel Ángel Díez, Imanol Uribe, Fernando Colomo, Juan Diego Botto, Alfonso Ungría, José Luis García Sánchez, Daniel Cebrián, El Gran Wyoming, Manuel Gómez Pereira, Julio Medem, Mireia Lluch, Pere Joan Ventura, Manuel Rivas, Vicente Aranda, Mariano Barroso, Antonio Betancor and Diego Galán.)	Hay Motivo PC.
2004 (19th)	De niños		Joaquim Jordà	Massa D´Or Producciones Cinematográficas
2004 (19th)	Salvador Allende		Patricio Guzmán	Mediapro
2005 (20th)	Cineastas contra magnates		Carlos Benpar	Producciones Kilimanjaro
2005 (20th)	Iberia		Carlos Saura	Morena Films, Wild Bunch, Telemadrid
2005 (20th)	Trece entre mil		Iñaki Arteta	Leize Producciones, Notro Films
2005 (20th)	Veinte años no es nada		Joaquim Jordà	Ovideo TV
2006 (21st)	Cineastas en acción		Carlos Benpar	Producciones Kilimanjaro
2006 (21st)	Hécuba, un sueño de pasión		Arantxa Aguirre and José Luis López-Linares	López-Li Films
2006 (21st)	La silla de Fernando		David Trueba	Buenavida Producciones
2006 (21st)	Más allá del espejo		Joaquim Jordà	Únicamente Severo, Ovideo TV
2007 (22nd)	Invisibles		Mariano Barroso, Isabel Coixet, Javier Corcuera Andrino, Fernando León de Aranoa, Wim Wenders	Pinguin Films, Reposado
2007 (22nd)	El productor		Fernando Méndez-Leite	Turner Broadcasting System España
2007 (22nd)	Fados		Carlos Saura	Zebra Producciones, Fadofilmes, Duvideo
2007 (22nd)	Lucio		Aitor Arregui, José María Goenaga	Moriarti Produkzioak, Irusoin, ETB
2008 (23rd)	Bucarest, la memoria perdida		Alberto Solé	Bausan Films
2008 (23rd)	El pollo, el pez y el cangrejo real		José Luis López-Linares	Lopez-Li Films, Zebra Producciones
2008 (23rd)	El último truco, Emilio Ruiz del Rio		Sigfrid Monleón	Aiete-Ariane Films
2008 (23rd)	Old Man Bebo		Carlos Carcas	Babel Films, Fernando Trueba, Iberautor Promociones Culturales
2009 (24th)	Garbo: The Spy	Garbo: El espía	Edmon Roch	Edmon Roch, Susanna Jiménez
2009 (24th)	Cómicos		Ana Pérez, Marta Arribas	Xavier Crespo
2009 (24th)	La mirada de Ouka Leele		Rafael Gordon	Rafael Gordon
2009 (24th)	Últimos testigos: Carrillo comunista		José Luis López-Linares, Manuel Martín Cuenca	Juan Gordon

=== 2010s ===
Year	English title	Original title	Director(s)	Producer(s)
2010 (25th)	Bicicleta, cuchara, manzana		Carles Bosch	Oriol Ivern, Tono Folguera, Joan Salvat, Muntsa Tarrés, Andrés Luque, Pere Gibert
2010 (25th)	Ciudadano Negrín		Carlos Álvarez, Imanol Uribe, Sigfrid Monleón	Andrés Santana
2010 (25th)	How Much Does Your Building Weigh, Mr. Foster?		Norberto López Amado, Carlos Carcas	Elena Ochoa, Andrés Santana, Imanol Uribe
2010 (25th)	María y yo		Félix Fernández de Castro	Andrés Luque, Loris Omedes, Félix Fernández de Castro, Jordi Ambrós
2011 (26th)	Escuchando al juez Garzón		Isabel Coixet	Isabel Coixet
2011 (26th)	30 años de oscuridad		Manuel Hidalgo Martín	Olmo Figueredo González-Quevedo, Enrique Fernández Guzmán, Fernando Larrondo
2011 (26th)	El cuaderno de barro		Isaki Lacuesta	Luisa Matienzo
2011 (26th)	Morente		Emilio Ruiz Barrachina	Emilio Ruíz Barrachina
2012 (27th)	Sons of the Clouds: The Last Colony	Hijos de las nubes, la última colonia	Álvaro Longoria	Javier Bardem, Lilly Hartley, Álvaro Longoria
2012 (27th)	Contra el tiempo		José Manuel Serrano Cueto	Carlos Taillefer
2012 (27th)	Los mundos sutiles		Eduardo Chapero-Jackson	Ana Amigo
2012 (27th)	Mapa		León Siminiani	Stefan Schmitz, María Zamora
2013 (28th)	Las maestras de la República		Pilar Pérez Solano	Pilar Pérez Solano
2013 (28th)	Con la pata quebrada		Diego Galán	Agustín Almodóvar, Enrique Cerezo
2013 (28th)	Guadalquivir		Joaquín Gutiérrez Acha	José María Morales
2013 (28th)	Món Petit (Mundo pequeño)		Marcel Barrena	Adrià Cuatrecases, Víctor Correal, Oriol Maymó
2014 (29th)	Paco de Lucía: La búsqueda		Francisco Sánchez Varela	Anxo Rodríguez Rodríguez, Lucía Sánchez Varela
2014 (29th)	Born in Gaza	2014. Nacido en Gaza	Hernán Zin	Hernán Zin, Nieves Rebolledo Vila, Olmo Figueredo González-Quevedo, Jon Sistiaga
2014 (29th)	Edificio España		Víctor Moreno	Victor Moreno
2014 (29th)	El último adiós de Bette Davis		Pedro González Bermúdez	Javier Morales, Juan Zavala
2015 (30th)	Sueños de sal		Alfredo Navarro Benito	Jesús Navarro Alberola
2015 (30th)	Chicas nuevas 24 horas		Mabel Lozano	Mabel Lozano, Guadalupe Balaguer, Fernando Skolowich, Victoria Aizenstat, Annabelle Aramburu, Javier Mudarra, Katalina Boham, Mauricio Aristizabal, Osvaldo Ortiz Faiman, Sebastián Peña Escobar, Tania Simbron
2015 (30th)	I Am Your Father		Marcos Cabota and Toni Bestard	Paula Serra, Miquel Verd, Toni Bestard, Marcos Cabotá, Nacho Tejedor
2015 (30th)	The Propaganda Game		Álvaro Longoria	Álvaro Longoria
2016 (31st)	Frágil equilibrio		Guillermo García López	Sintagma Films
2016 (31st)	Born in Syria	Nacido en Siria	Hernán Zin	Contramedia Films, La Claqueta
2016 (31st)	Omega		Gervasio Iglesias, José Sánchez-Montes	Sacromonte Films, Universal Music, Telecinco Cinema
2016 (31st)	El bosco. El jardín de los sueños		José Luis López-Linares	López-Li Films
2017 (32nd)	Lots of Kids, a Monkey and a Castle	Muchos hijos, un mono y un castillo	Gustavo Salmerón	Sueños Despiertos
2017 (32nd)	Cantábrico: Los dominios del oso pardo		Joaquín Gutiérrez Acha	Wanda Visión
2017 (32nd)	Dancing Beethoven		Arantxa Aguirre Carballeira	López-Li Films, Fondation Béjart Ballet Lausanne
2017 (32nd)	Saura(s)		Félix Viscarret	Imval Madrid, Pantalla Partida
2018 (33rd)	The Silence of Others	El silencio de los otros	Almudena Carracedo, Robert Bahar	Semilla Verde Productions, Lucernam Films
2018 (33rd)	Apuntes para una película de atracos		Elías León Siminiani	Avalon Productora Cinematográfica
2018 (33rd)	Camarón: flamenco y revolución		Alexis Morante	Media Events, Lolita Films
2018 (33rd)	Sad Hill Unearthed	Desenterrando Sad Hill	Guillermo de Oliveira	Sadhill Desenterrado, Zapruder Pictures
2019 (34th)	Ara Malikian, una vida entre las cuerdas		Nata Moreno, Ara Malikian	Kokoro Films
2019 (34th)	Aute Retrato		Gaizka Urresti	Altube Filmeak, Urresti Producciones
2019 (34th)	Historias de nuestro cine		Ana Pérez-Lorente, Antonio Resines	Enrique Cerezo
2019 (34th)	El cuadro		Andrés Sanz	Mare Films

=== 2020s ===
Year	English title	Original title	Director(s)	Producer(s)
2020 (35th)	The Year of the Discovery	El año del descubrimiento	Luis López Carrasco	Lacima Producciones
2020 (35th)	My Mexican Bretzel		Núria Giménez Lorang	Bretzel & Tequila, Avalon Productora Cinematográfica
2020 (35th)	Anatomia de un Dandy		Charlie Arnaiz, Alberto Ortega	Malvalanda, Por amor al arte producciones, RTVE, Dada Films and Entertainment
2020 (35th)	Cartas mojadas		Paula Palacios	Morada Films
2021 (36th)	Who's Stopping Us	Quién lo impide	Jonás Trueba	Javier Lafuente, Laura Renau, Lorena Tudela
2021 (36th)	The Return: Life After ISIS	El retorno: la vida después del ISIS	Alba Sotorra	Alba Sotorra, Carles Torras, Vesna Cudic
2021 (36th)	Heroes. Silence and Rock and Roll	Héroes. Silencio y rock & roll	Alexis Morante	José Pastor, Miguel Ángel Lamata, Raúl García Medrano, Vanessa Montfort
2021 (36th)	Tehran Blues	Un blues para Teherán	Javier Tolentino	Alejandra Mora Pérez, Luis Miñarro
2022 (37th)	Labordeta, un hombre sin más		Gaizka Urresti	Gaizka Urresti
2022 (37th)	A las mujeres de España. María Lejárraga		Guillermo Rojas	Guillermo Rojas
2022 (37th)	El sostre groc		Isabel Coixet	Isabel Coixet
2022 (37th)	Oswald. El falsificador		Kike Maíllo	Alberto Aranda Velasco, Bernat Saumell, Dani de la Orden, Kike Maíllo, Toni Carrizosa
2022 (37th)	Sintiéndolo mucho		Fernando León de Aranoa	Francisco Cordero, Patricia de Muns, Ricardo Coeto, Sergi Reitg
2023 (38th)	Mientras seas tú, el aquí y ahora de Carme Elias		Claudia Pinto Emperador	Claudia Pinto Emperador, Iván Martínez-Rufat, Joana M. Ortueta, Jordi Llorca, Óscar Bernàcer, Pilar Llorca
2023 (38th)	Caleta Palace		José Antonio Hergueta	José Antonio Hergueta, Leticia Salvago Soto
2023 (38th)	Contigo, contigo y sin mí		Amaya Villar Navascués	Amaya Villar Navascués, Carlo D'Ursi
2023 (38th)	This Excessive Ambition	Esta ambición desmedida	Cristina Trenas, Rogelio González, Santos Bacana	Antón Álvarez, Cristina Trenas, Isabel Utrera Alfaro, María Rubio, Patricia Alfaro, Rogelio González, Santos Bacana
2023 (38th)	Iberia, naturaleza infinita		Arturo Menor Campillo	Arturo Menor Campillo, Cristina Menor
2024 (39th)	The Flamenco Guitar of Yerai Cortés	La guitarra flamenca de Yerai Cortés	Antón Álvarez	Antón Álvarez, Cristina Trenas, Santos Bacana
2024 (39th)	Domingo domingo		Laura García Andreu	Arunas Matelis, Pepe Andreu, Rafa Molés
2024 (39th)	Marisol, llámame Pepa		Blanca Torres	Chema de la Peña, José Carlos de Isla Troncoso, Paco Ortiz
2024 (39th)	Mi hermano Ali		Paula Palacios	Paula Palacios
2024 (39th)	No estás sola		Almudena Carracedo, Robert Bahar	Almudena Carracedo, Robert Bahar
2025 (40th)	Afternoons of Solitude	Tardes de soledad	Albert Serra	Albert Serra, Luis Ferrón, Montse Triola, Pedro Palacios
2025 (40th)	Todos somos Gaza		Hernán Zin	Anuska Simón, Hernán Zin, Khaled Habayed, Yousef Hammash
2025 (40th)	Eloy de la Iglesia. Adicto al cine		Gaizka Urresti	Julio Díez, Oihana Olea
2025 (40th)	Flores para Antonio		Elena Molina, Isaki Lacuesta	Alba Flores, Bruna Hernando
2025 (40th)	The Sleeper. The Lost Caravaggio	The Sleeper. El caravaggio perdido	Álvaro Longoria	Francisco Pou, Gerardo Olivares, Ricardo Fernández-Deu
