= The Cordillera of Dreams =

2019 documentary film

- Promotional release poster
- French: La Cordillère des songes
- Directed by: Patricio Guzmán
- Written by: Patricio Guzmán
- Produced by: Renate Sachse
- Cinematography: Samuel Lahu
- Edited by: Emmanuelle Joly
- Production companies: ARTE; Atacama Productions
- Release date: May 17, 2019 (Cannes)
- Running time: 85 minutes
- Countries: France; Chile
- Language: Spanish

The Cordillera of Dreams (Spanish: La cordillera de los sueños / French: La Cordillère des songes) is a 2019 Chilean-French documentary film directed by Patricio Guzmán. It is considered the third installment in a trilogy of films by Guzmán about his native country, Chile, alongside Nostalgia for the Light (2010) and The Pearl Button (2015).

The film was nominated for Best Documentary Film at the 45th César Awards, being the second nomination for Guzmán in this category after The Pearl Button in 2016. The film was selected as the Chilean entry for Best Iberoamerican Film at the 36th Goya Awards, later receiving the nomination.

== Release ==
The film premiered at the 2019 Cannes Film Festival in the Special screenings section. At the festival, the film shared the L'Œil d'or award with For Sama.

== Reception ==
On review aggregator website Rotten Tomatoes, the film holds an approval rating of 91% based on 23 reviews, with an average rating of 8.10. On Metacritic, the film holds a rating of 83 out of 100, based on 6 critics, indicating "universal acclaim".

Deborah Young of The Hollywood Reporter wrote about the film that "in and of itself, it is a mournfully intelligent, poetic documentary that once more seeks to link the vastness, grandeur and indifference of nature with the human horrors that Chileans have lived through". Jessica Kiang of Variety commented about the film and its place within Guzmán's trilogy of films, writing that "taken as a completed project, Guzmán's late-career trinity is a stunning achievement in the cinema of the hidden pattern and the startling, unexpected connection".

=== Awards and nominations ===
Award	Date of ceremony	Category	Recipient(s)	Result	Ref.
Cannes Film Festival	May 25, 2019	L'Œil d'or	The Cordillera of Dreams	Won	
César Awards	February 28, 2020	Best Documentary Film	The Cordillera of Dreams	Nominated	
Goya Awards	February 12, 2022	Best Ibero-American Film	The Cordillera of Dreams	Won	
