= Dawson Isla 10 =

- Directed by: Miguel Littín
- Written by: Miguel Littín
- Produced by: Miguel Littín; Cristián de la Fuente; Miguel Ioan Littín
- Starring: Benjamín Vicuña; Cristián de la Fuente; Bertrand Duarte; Pablo Krögh
- Cinematography: Miguel Ioan Littín
- Music by: Juan Cristóbal Meza
- Production company: Azul Films
- Release date: September 11, 2009
- Running time: 117 minutes
- Country: Chile
- Language: Spanish
- Budget: 2 million

Dawson Isla 10 is a 2009 Chilean drama film, written, co-produced and directed by Miguel Littín, a Chilean film director. The screenplay is based on Isla 10, a book by Sergio Bitar about his experiences as a political prisoner; "Isla 10" was the substitute name their guards imposed him during his imprisonment.

== Plot ==
The 1973 Chilean coup d'état led to the overthrow of President Salvador Allende and the rise to power of Augusto Pinochet in Chile. This film depicts the former members of Allende's cabinet, who were apprehended and confined in a political prison on Dawson Island, Tierra del Fuego, which had been transformed into a concentration camp. In the early 20th century, the camp was used to relocate Selkʼnam and other indigenous groups from the main island, in order to put an end to their interference with the large sheep ranches that had been established, as they persisted in hunting in their former territories.

In 1973, Pinochet's government also imprisoned hundreds of other suspected communists and political dissidents on Dawson Island. Under the strict control of the Chilean Navy, these men struggled to survive the freezing temperatures and severe conditions.

== Cast ==
- Benjamín Vicuña as Sergio Bitar
- Bertrand Duarte as Miguel Lawner
- Pablo Krögh as José Tohá
- Cristián de la Fuente as Teniente Labarca
- Sergio Hernández as Comandante Sallay
- Luis Dubó as Sargento Figueroa
- Caco Monteiro as Fernando Flores
- Horacio Videla as Dr. Arturo Jiron
- Matías Vega as Osvaldo Puccio
- Andrés Skoknik as Orlando Letelier
- Elvis Fuentes as Clodomiro Almeyda
- Sergio Allard as Aristóteles España

== Submissions ==
The film was nominated for Best Spanish Language Foreign Film at the 24th edition of Goya Awards.
