= My Imaginary Country =

- International release poster
- Directed by: Patricio Guzmán
- Written by: Patricio Guzmán
- Produced by: Alexandra Galvis; Renate Sachse
- Narrated by: Patricio Guzmán
- Cinematography: Samuel Lahu
- Edited by: Laurence Manheimer
- Music by: José Miguel Tobar; Miguel Miranda
- Production companies: Arte France Cinéma; Atacama Productions; Market Chile
- Distributed by: Pyramide Distribution
- Release dates: May 20, 2022 (Cannes); August 11, 2022 (Chile); September 23, 2022 (USA and Spain)
- Running time: 83 minutes
- Countries: Chile; France
- Language: Spanish

My Imaginary Country (Spanish: Mi país imaginario) is a 2022 documentary film written and directed by Patricio Guzmán. It features Guzmán narrating how the protests by a group of students in Santiago on October 18, 2019 triggered the most massive popular revolt known in the country's history and the consequences that were experienced.

The film was named on the shortlist for Chilean's entry for the Academy Award for Best International Feature Film at the 95th Academy Awards, but it was not selected.

== Narrator ==
- Patricio Guzmán

== Release ==
=== Festivals ===
It premiered worldwide on May 20, 2022, at the 75th Cannes Film Festival. Later, It was screened in July 2022 at the Jerusalem Film Festival, on September 13 of the same year at the 47th Toronto International Film Festival and 3 days later in the Latin Horizons section at the 70th San Sebastián International Film Festival.

=== Theatrical ===
It was commercially released on August 11, 2022, in Chilean theaters, then expanded to the American and Spanish market on September 23, 2022.

== Reception ==
=== Box-office ===
My Imaginary Country sold more than 10,000 tickets in its first week of release in Chilean theaters, while in the rest of the world it grossed a total of $16,191.

=== Critical reception ===
On the review aggregator website Rotten Tomatoes, 94% of 33 critics' reviews are positive, with an average rating of 7.9/10. The website's consensus reads: "A poignant meeting of impassioned filmmaker and fraught historical moment, My Imaginary Country surveys the past with care and greets the future with optimism." Metacritic, which uses a weighted average, assigned the film a score of 86 out of 100, based on 8 critics, indicating "universal acclaim".

=== Accolades ===
Year	Award / Festival	Category	Recipient	Result	Ref.
2022	Cannes Film Festival	Golden Eye	My Imaginary Country	Nominated	
2022	Jerusalem Film Festival	In Spirit for Freedom Award - Best Documentary Film	My Imaginary Country	Won	
2022	San Sebastián International Film Festival	Horizons Award	My Imaginary Country	Nominated	
2022	Oslo Films from the South Festival	Best Documentary	My Imaginary Country	Nominated	
2023	Platino Awards	Best Documentary	My Imaginary Country	Nominated	
