= The Pearl Button =

2015 film

- Film poster
- Directed by: Patricio Guzmán
- Produced by: Renate Sachse
- Cinematography: Katell Djian
- Release dates: 8 February 2015 (Berlinale); 15 October 2015 (Chile)
- Running time: 82 minutes
- Country: Chile
- Language: Spanish

The Pearl Button (Spanish: El botón de nácar) is a 2015 Chilean documentary film directed by Patricio Guzmán. It was screened in the main competition section of the 65th Berlin International Film Festival where it won the Silver Bear for Best Script. It won the Lumière Award for Best Documentary at the 21st Lumière Awards. Guzmán has described the work as part of a trilogy with Nostalgia for the Light and third film The Cordillera of Dreams focusing on the Andes.

It explores themes common to other Guzmán films, such as memory and the historical past, particularly that of history's losers rather than victors, recording some of the last surviving members of the original Alacalufe and Yaghan tribes. A departure for Guzmán is that it does not focus solely on Chile's past under Augusto Pinochet, as the title was partly inspired by a shirt button discovered during a 2004 investigation by Chilean judge Juan Guzmán on a length of rail used to weigh the bodies of Pinochet's victims dumped in the sea and partly by the button after which the Yaghan native Jemmy Button was named when taken aboard HMS Beagle in 1830.

== Summary ==
The film explores the geography and history of Chile, with a focus on water. The narrative examines the fate of two persecuted groups - the indigenous peoples and the victims of the Pinochet regime. Visually it operates across scales using a large parchment map by artist Emma Malig. The topics covered include the far north of Chile, which is the driest place on earth, where radio telescopes in the desert study the universe. The film also touches on personal experiences, such as a school friend lost to the sea.

The narrative describes the genocide of semi-nomadic Kawésqar, Selkʼnam, Aónikenk, and Yaghan tribes in the far south and how their way of life was destroyed by colonialism and missions. For this, it follows the story of Jemmy Button, who was taken from Tierra del Fuego to England. The film describes the efforts made under Salvador Allende, the president of Chile from 1970-1973, to rehabilitate the surviving tribespeople, and the later concentration camps established under Pinochet. It depicts how inmates were tortured and their bodies, weighted with lengths of rail, were dropped from helicopters into the Pacific. The film's name derives from one such rail, retrieved from the ocean and found to have a shirt button encrusted onto it.

== Accolades ==
List of Accolades
Award / Film Festival	Category	Recipient(s)	Result
2015 Biografilm Festival	Best film Unipol Award	Patricio Guzmán	Won
2015 Biografilm Festival	Audience Award	Patricio Guzmán	Won
2015 Berlin International Film Festival	Silver Berlin Bear for Best Script	Patricio Guzmán	Won
2015 Berlin International Film Festival	Prize of the Ecumenical Jury	Patricio Guzmán	Won
2015 Berlin International Film Festival	Golden Berlin Bear	Patricio Guzmán	Nominated
2015 Philadelphia Film Festival	Best Documentary Feature	The Pearl Button	Won
