= Nostalgia for the Light =

- Directed by: Patricio Guzmán
- Written by: Patricio Guzmán
- Produced by: Renate Sachse
- Starring: Gaspar Galaz; Lautaro Núñez; Luís Henríquez; Miguel Lawner; Victor González; Vicky Saavedra; Violeta Berrios; George Preston; Valentina Rodríguez
- Cinematography: Katell Djian
- Edited by: Patricio Guzmán; Emmanuelle Joly
- Music by: Miguel Miranda; José Miguel Tobar
- Distributed by: Pyramide International (France); Icarus Films (US)
- Release dates: May 13, 2010 (Cannes); March 17, 2011
- Running time: 90 minutes
- Countries: France; Chile; Germany; Spain; USA
- Languages: Spanish; English
- Box office: $156,928

Nostalgia for the Light (Spanish: Nostalgia de la luz) is a 2010 documentary film by Patricio Guzmán to address the lasting impacts of Augusto Pinochet's dictatorship. Guzmán focuses on the similarities between astronomers researching humanity's past, in an astronomical sense, and the struggle of many Chilean women who still search, after decades, for the remains of their relatives murdered during the dictatorship. Patricio Guzmán narrates the documentary himself and the documentary includes interviews and commentary from those affected and from astronomers and archeologists.

As a filmmaker, Patricio Guzmán's filmography has focused mostly on the political and social issues that have plagued Chile. He explored Chile under Salvador Allende and his government (Salvador Allende, 2004), and Pinochet's dictatorship and his human rights abuses (see Batalla de Chile (The Battle of Chile trilogy, 1975-1979), Le cas Pinochet (The Pinochet Case, 2001), and others; the latter film deals more so with the aftermath of those human rights abuses).

== Plot ==
Nostalgia for the Light opens with a view of a telescope and images of the Moon. The narrator, Patricio Guzmán, describes how he came to love astronomy and begins to remember his childhood during which “only the present moment existed.” Soon, Chile became the center of the world as astronomers and scientists flocked to Chile to observe the universe through the thin and clear skies. We next see Guzmán walking in the Atacama Desert, a place with absolutely no moisture, so much so that it resembles the surface of Mars. This desert, and its abundance of history, becomes the focus of the documentary. Because of how dry it is, the desert hosts the untouched remains of fish, mollusks, Indian carvings, and even mummified humans.

Astronomer Gaspar Galaz is introduced and comments on how astronomy is a way to look into the past to understand our origins. It is generally a science seeking answer, but, in the process, creates more questions to answer. He comments that science in general, like astronomy and geology, is a look into the past; even sitting there having this interview, he comments, is a conversation in the past because of the millionths of a second light takes to travel and be processed. Lautaro Núñez relates astronomer's endeavors to his own; archeologists and astronomers have to recreate the past while in the present by using only a few traces.

The documentary then shifts into Chile's recent past dealing with Pinochet and his dictatorship. Luís Henríquez, a survivor from the Chacabuco concentration camp, describes how a group of about 20, led by a Doctor Alvarez (who was knowledgeable in astronomy), were taught theory during the day and learned how to identify constellations at night. They learned how to create a device that helped them track the constellations, and while they studied the cosmos they “all had a feeling of great freedom,” as Henríquez describes it. The military, however, quickly banned these lessons because they believed the prisoners could escape using the constellations. Miguel Lawner, similarly, was a prisoner who survived the concentration camp. He is referred to as the “architect” in the movie because he was able to memorize and then later recreate the environment the prisoners lived in. Miguel would measure buildings and the grounds with footsteps and would then draw a scaled version of the concentration camps with those measurements. He would rip his drawings up and hide them at night, in case of a raid, and then flush them down the latrines in the morning. The narrator concludes that he and his wife Anita are a metaphor for Chile: Henríquez remembers what happened in the past, while Anita, who has Alzheimer's disease, is forgetting.

Valentina Rodríguez talks about how her grandparents were detained and threatened to give up the location of her parents. After their captors threatened to hurt Valentina, her grandparents complied and her parents were taken away. However, Valentina acknowledges that she and her parents all belong to the recyclable matter of the universe, which brings peace to her. She has a son, who she knows will not have to suffer dictatorial violence like his past generations. This idea leaves her strong and optimistic. Guzmán ends the documentary affirming the value of memory because, as he states, “those who have a memory are able to live in the fragile present moments. Those who have none don't live anywhere.”

== Cast ==
- Patricio Guzmán – Narrator of documentary
- Gaspar Galaz – Professor of Astronomy at the Pontifical Catholic University of Chile ( Universidad Católica ).
- Lautaro Núñez – Archeologist.
- Luís Henríquez – Held in the Chacabuco concentration camp from Nov of 1973 to Oct of 1974. He was part of a group of 20 prisoners who together looked up and learned the constellations. He was referred to as the “transmitter of history” because of his memories of the camp.
- Miguel Lawner – Another survivor of the concentration camp. Known as the architect of memories, he was able to memorize and draw the layouts of the camps and what they looked like.
- Victor González – A software engineer at the ALMA telescope, and the president of the Workers Union of the ALMA Telescope Project.
- Vicky Saavedra – A woman who still searches the desert for her loved ones.
- Violeta Berríos – Another woman still searching the desert for her loved ones.
- George Preston – Senior staff astronomer from The Observatories of the Carnegie Institution of Washington DC and member of the US National Academy of Sciences.
- Valentina Rodríguez – Staff astronomer and press officer at the European Southern Observatory headquarters in Santiago Chile.

== Release and accolades ==
=== Release ===
Nostalgia for the Light was first released in France on May 14, 2010 at the Cannes Film Festival. It was released in several other European countries subsequently, like Poland and Spain, and finally arrived in the US in select theaters on March 17, 2011.

=== Awards ===
- European Film Awards (2010)
- Won European Film Award for Best Documentary
- Special mention from Special Jury Prize, 2010 Sheffield Doc/Fest
- Los Angeles Latino International Film Festival (2011)
- Won Jury Award for Best Documentary
- Winner Best Documentary, Prix ARTE, 2010 European Film Academy Awards
- Winner Best Documentary, 2010 Abu Dhabi Film Festival
- Winner, Allan King Documentary Award, Toronto Film Critics Association Awards. (2011)
- Official Selection, 2010 Cannes Film Festival
- Official Selection, 2010 Toronto International Film Festival
- Official Selection, 2011 San Francisco International Film Festival
- Official Selection, 2011 Miami International Film Festival
- Official Selection, 2010 Melbourne International Film Festival
- Nominated: Best Documentary Screenplay from the Writers Guild of America

== Analysis ==
The Atacama Desert in Chile is known for being one of the driest deserts in the world. As a result, scientists and astronomers from around the world travel to the desert and use it as a site to perform their own research. These astronomers are able to look clearly up into the sky and observe the universe that surrounds us to try to understand the origins of the cosmos. Similarly, the lack of humidity not only helps astronomers see the universe, but it helps archaeologists and Chileans access traces and remains of the past. The dry climate helps preserve these traces as if they were left untouched. Some Chileans are interested in these remnants, especially in finding the bodies of their loved ones who disappeared during the reign of Pinochet. Nostalgia for the Light focuses on the similarity: astronomers' desire to understand the past and origin of the universe and Chileans' desire to find and know what happened to the ones that they loved. This documentary juggles with remembering of the past and forgetting it. The Pinochet Military dictatorship detained and killed thousands of Chileans and later tried to conceal this act by erasing any evidence of its occurrence. Many Chileans have now, much like the dictatorship did, forgotten or ignored the fact that such acts ever took place. But, even though the dictatorship tried to conceal their acts, people still continue to search for those that went missing. Women search zealously for the remains of those that they love so that they can gain some comfort and peace back in their lives.

Patricio Guzmán's documentary compares two seemingly different ideas in a way that presents them to be the same endeavor. Guzmán stresses the struggle these Chilean women face as they try to find their loved one's bodies, and at the same time he points out how astronomers struggle to understand humanity's origin by looking at the cosmos. Both groups delve into the past in order to create a more solid and concrete understanding of it. The women who search the desert look for the calcium in the form of bones while the astronomers look for calcium as a remnant of stars and the big bang. Slides were shown of asteroids that then transitioned into close-ups of bone fragments. The difference is indistinguishable, and expresses, on a deeper level, that these astronomers and women are on the same journey. In the documentary, searching for origins inform life in the present.

The film challenges Chile's national practice to forget what happened and its lack of accountability. A paradox presented by Guzmán is that Chile is a place where accessing the past is the easiest, yet the Chilean people are unable to acknowledge or reconcile with their own past. These women who try and understand the past are seen by many as merely a nuisance to society. People relate more with the astronomers than they do with Vicky and Violeta. Some Chileans have decided, instead of acknowledging and understanding their past, to put aside what happened and pretend like it never occurred. In the documentary, Guzmán referred to Miguel and his wife Anita as a metaphor for Chile: one tries to remember his past and origins while the other forgets. This idea becomes one of Guzmán's main points: they should not be forgetting, but instead remembering to learn more about their own origins. At the end of the film, Guzmán states that only those who understand their past are able to live in the present and look into the future. Those who do not are unable to; they do not exist because they have “no beginning and no future.”

== Reception ==
Nostalgia for the Light opened to wide acclaim from critics. On the review aggregator website Rotten Tomatoes, the film has a100% approval rating based on 48 reviews. On Metacritic, which uses a weighted average out of 100, the film has a score of 91 based on 19 reviews, indicating "universal acclaim". Stephen Holden, writer for The New York Times, praised it as a “transfixing cinematic essay.” He comments that the film is a narrative reflective about the importance of time and sends a political message about memory. Guzmán is said to express his longing for the Chile he grew up in, when the times were more peaceful. Nonetheless, his “belief in eternal memory is an astounding leap of faith.”

Kenton Smith, from Uptown, reiterates a similar stance. He states that the archeologists and astronomers (archeologists being the historians of what's underneath the earth and astronomers being the archeologist of the cosmos) have the most in common as they both recreate the past. The documentary is praised for its stunning visuals and impressive views of the cosmos but despite the aesthetics, it evokes the idea that we, according to Smith, “concern ourselves with fleeting power and evil deeds, treating both as though they are more than mere smudges on a much larger blueprint.”

Kenneth Turan of the Los Angeles Times comments that the connections between the astronomers, archeologists, the Atacama, and the women who searched for their loved ones is the focus of the film. The relationship they all share, their goals, is all connected to the notion of returning to and remembering Chile's past.

Amy Biancolli of the San Francisco Chronicle praised the visuals of the film, writing that the film is "a strange and stunning work of art: a poem disguised as a movie... the effect is heartrending and exquisitely beautiful, a tribute to memory as the "gravitational force" that forever binds and defines us.

The documentary was well received by critics in Chile. Ascanio Cavallo, from El Mercurio, praises the movie for being poetic and provocative. Cristóbal Fredes of La Tercera comments that the film received great reviews from The New York Times and the Los Angeles Times. The parallels in his documentary, Guzmán said, were the most important part and the focus of the film. Guzmán purposefully made the story he told poetic. Zapatos Chinos claims Guzmán to be an important filmmaker in Latin America. His film is stated, again, to be poetic and contains beautiful images that ask to be looked at and interpreted. The film engages us to take a journey that brings us throughout space, not only the cosmos but also the earth beneath our feet.

In 2014, it was voted one of the 50 greatest documentaries of all time in the British Film Institute's poll in Sight & Sound. In the 2022 Sight and Sound critic's poll to determine the greatest films of all time, Nostalgia for the Light was tied for 243rd place.

== See also ==
- Cinema of Chile
- List of films with a 100% rating on Rotten Tomatoes
