= Eduardo Bitrán =

Chilean politician

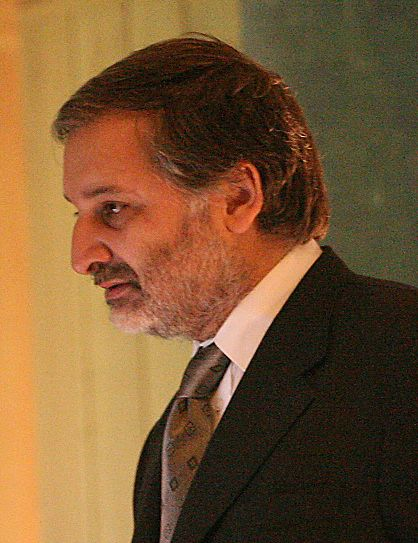

Executive Vice President of the CORFO
- In office 18 March 2014 – 9 March 2018
- Preceded by: Hernán Cheyre
- Succeeded by: Sebastián Sichel

Minister of Public Works
- In office 11 March 2006 – 11 January 2008
- Preceded by: Jaime Estévez
- Succeeded by: Sergio Bitar

Personal details
- Born: 3 August 1957 (age 69) Ovalle, Chile
- Party: Party for Democracy
- Spouse: Yael Hasson
- Children: Two
- Education: University of Chile (BA); Boston University (MA)
- Occupation: Politician, Researcher and Scholar
- Profession: Civil engineer

Eduardo Nesim Bitrán Colodro (born 3 August 1957) is a Chilean civil engineer and politician who served for the two governments of Michelle Bachelet.

== Biography ==
He attended Primary School No. 1 in Ovalle and later the Boys' High School of that city. He completed his secondary education at the Instituto Hebreo in Santiago, an institution for the Jewish community.

He subsequently studied industrial engineering at the University of Chile and later pursued doctoral studies in economics at Boston University in the United States.

He is married to Yael Hasson, a psychopedagogue and president of the Women's International Zionist Organization (WIZO), an organization that brings together Jewish women worldwide. They have two children.

== Political career ==
Between 1981 and 1990, he was a faculty member in the Department of Industrial Engineering at his alma mater and joined the Center for Development Studies.

In 1989, he worked with Jorge Marshall on the design of technology policies for the government program of the Concertación, and in 1990 he joined the Ministry of Finance as a microeconomic adviser during the administration of President Patricio Aylwin.

In 1994, he joined the Party for Democracy (PPD).

He became a key executive at the state-owned Corporation for Production Development (CORFO) during the administration of Eduardo Frei Ruiz-Tagle and also participated in several private-sector companies, including the pharmacy chain Salcobrand, in which his family was a significant shareholder.

He is the nephew of Marco Colodro, a close friend of Ricardo Lagos, and was also one of the founding members of the influential Expansiva Foundation in 2001.

From July 1997 to March 2006, he was chief executive officer of Fundación Chile.

He assumed ministerial office in March 2006 and faced his first major challenge in mid-July of that year when severe storms in the Biobío Region caused widespread flooding and road closures. The most serious disruption affected the route connecting the communes of Lota and Arauco on the so-called Ruta de la Madera.

Later that month, he confronted another major controversy involving Chiloé Island. Bitrán announced that the Chacao Bridge would not be built due to its high cost. He appeared before the National Congress of Chile to discuss the decision with deputies and senators, facing intense criticism but ultimately emerging politically unscathed. Instead of constructing the bridge, President Michelle Bachelet adopted, on the recommendation of Bitrán and Finance Minister Andrés Velasco, a series of connectivity measures for the Chiloé Archipelago.

At the beginning of 2008, he was removed from office and replaced by fellow PPD member Sergio Bitar, also an engineer but with a more overtly political profile.

His departure was attributed to the limited number of public works projects undertaken during his administration and to tensions with the concessionaires' trade association, which criticized both the lack of new projects and his insistence on closely supervising ongoing initiatives.

In April 2008, he returned to government as president of the National Innovation Council for Competitiveness, succeeding former Finance Minister Nicolás Eyzaguirre. He left that position a few weeks after Sebastián Piñera assumed the presidency in 2010.

In March 2014, during the second administration of Michelle Bachelet, he became Executive Vice President of CORFO, serving until the end of the administration in March 2018.

At the same time, he was a member of the Presidential Commission on Science for Development in 2015.

He is a professor in the Faculty of Engineering and Sciences at the Adolfo Ibáñez University, where he teaches Project Formulation and Evaluation.
