= Chile, Obstinate Memory =

- Spanish: Chile, la memoria obstinada
- Directed by: Patricio Guzmán
- Produced by: Yves Jeanneau; Éric Michel
- Narrated by: Patricio Guzmán; Vincent Davy
- Cinematography: Éric Pittard; Pablo Saura
- Edited by: Hélène Girard
- Music by: Robert Marcel Lepage
- Production companies: Les Films d'Ici; National Film Board of Canada; La Sept-Arte
- Release date: August 1997 (MWFF)
- Running time: 59 minutes
- Countries: Chile; Belgium; Canada; France; Germany
- Language: Spanish

Chile, Obstinate Memory (Spanish: Chile, la memoria obstinada) is a documentary film, directed by Patricio Guzmán and released in 1997. The film profiles Guzmán's trip back to Chile, after years living and working outside the country, to screen his landmark documentary The Battle of Chile in the country for the first time.

The film premiered at the 1997 Montreal World Film Festival. It was later screened at the 1997 Toronto International Film Festival, the 1998 Sundance Film Festival, and the 1998 Hot Docs Canadian International Documentary Festival, before being broadcast on television as an episode of the documentary series The Passionate Eye in September 1998.

== Awards ==
Award	Date of ceremony	Category	Recipient(s)	Result	Ref.
Hot Docs Canadian International Documentary Festival	1998	Best Canadian Feature Documentary	Patricio Guzmán	Won	
Gemini Awards	1999	Best Direction in a Documentary Program or Series	Patricio Guzmán	Nominated	
Gemini Awards	1999	Best Picture Editing in a Documentary Program or Series	Hélène Girard	Nominated	
