= Hamza al-Kateab =

Syrian doctor

Hamza al-Kateab (Arabic: حمزة الخطيب) is a pseudonym used by a Syrian doctor, activist, and public health advocate. He is known for running the besieged al-Quds Hospital in eastern Aleppo during the Battle of Aleppo between 2012 and 2016. His work was featured in the 2019 documentary For Sama, which was co-directed by his wife, Waad al-Kateab.

== Personal life ==
Al-Kateab was born and raised in Aleppo, Syria. During the Battle of Aleppo, he lived at the al-Quds Hospital with his wife Waad and their daughter Sama. In 2016, he was displaced from Aleppo, and as of 2022, the family have been granted asylum in London, United Kingdom. He has two daughters.

== Medical career ==
Al-Kateab was living and working in western Aleppo when the Syrian civil war started in 2011; after the city's eastern neighbourhoods were declared as non-governmental areas in 2012, he moved there and set up the al-Quds Hospital, which remained operation until the end of the Battle of Aleppo in 2016. The hospital initially operated from the Sukari district; between 2012 and 2016, it was struck by at least three bombings; in April 2015, a blast killed six staff and 49 patients when it struck the hospital's emergency department. Following that attack, the hospital temporarily closed due to concerns that the building was no longer structurally sound; it reopened in August 2015 at a new site in the Salah al-Din district.

In November 2016, Aleppo's Health Directorate, in addition to the World Health Organization, reported that all medical hospitals in opposition-held areas of Aleppo had been destroyed. While al-Quds remained operating, this was not publicised to not make it a target of government attacks. In late 2016, following a six-month siege of Aleppo, an agreement was made between Turkey and Russia to evacuate residents who wished to leave the city. Al-Kateab oversaw the evacuation of al-Quds, and has been described as being the last doctor out of eastern Aleppo, only leaving once the final patients had been evacuated. Al-Kateab has disagreed with the term "evacuation" being used to describe Aleppines leaving the city, describing it instead as a "forced displacement". After leaving Aleppo in December 2016, al-Kateab and his family went on to be granted asylum in the United Kingdom, settling in London.

Al-Kateab's time running the al-Quds Hospital was featured prominently in the 2019 documentary For Sama, co-directed by his wife Waad al-Kateab and consisting wholly of footage she filmed during the Battle of Aleppo. The couple attended the 92nd Academy Awards, where the film was nominated for the Academy Award for Best Documentary Feature Film.

== Subsequent activism ==
Al-Kateab and his wife called for the West to pay attention to what was happening in Idlib during the first and second Idlib offensives, and has criticised inaction to stop or prevent the bombings of Idlib as well as Aleppo.

In 2022, al-Kateab led a protest outside the Russian embassy in London in response to the Russian bombings of hospitals as part of the Russian invasion of Ukraine. He is a critic of Vladimir Putin for the role he played in both the Ukrainian invasion and the Syrian civil war.
