= The Compass Rose (film) =

1983 film

- Film poster
- Directed by: Patricio Guzmán
- Written by: Patricio Guzmán
- Starring: Patxi Andión
- Cinematography: Pablo Martínez
- Release date: July 1983
- Running time: 90 minutes
- Country: Spain
- Language: Spanish

The Compass Rose (Spanish: La Rosa de los Vientos) is a 1983 Spanish drama film directed by Patricio Guzmán. It was entered into the 13th Moscow International Film Festival.

== Cast ==
- Patxi Andión as Sr. Haller
- José Antonio Rodríguez
- Nelson Villagra
- Asdrúbal Meléndez
- Gloria Laso as Sra. Haller
- Coca Rudolphy
- Héctor Noguera
- Eliana Vidal
- Fernando Gavidia
- Herbert Gabaldon
- Fernando Birri as Mateo
