= Waad Al-Kateab =

Syrian filmmaker and journalist

- وعد الخطيب
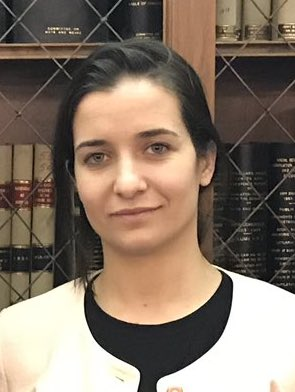
- Waad Al-Kateab in 2020
- Born: 1991 (age 34–35); Syria
- Occupations: Journalist, filmmaker
- Years active: 2011–current
- Employer: Channel 4
- Known for: For Sama (2019)
- Spouse: Hamza al-Kateab (m. 2014)
- Children: 2

Waad Al-Kateab (Arabic: وعد الخطيب; born c. 1991) is the pseudonym of a Syrian journalist, filmmaker, and activist. Her documentary, For Sama (2019), was nominated for four BAFTAs at the 73rd British Academy Film Awards, winning for Best Documentary, and was also nominated for Best Documentary Feature at the 92nd Academy Awards. Her coverage of the Battle for Aleppo won an International Emmy Award for Current Affairs & News for Channel 4 News. The pseudonymous surname Al-Kateab is used to protect her family.

Al-Kateab was included in Time's 100 Most Influential People in 2020.

== Biography ==
In 2009, 18-year-old Al-Kateab moved to Aleppo to study marketing at the University of Aleppo. In 2011, when the Syrian Civil War broke out, she started her journey as a citizen journalist and her reports on the war were broadcast on Channel 4 News in the United Kingdom, which became the most watched program of the UK News Channels She elected to stay and document her life over five years in Aleppo as she falls in love with Hamza – her friend-turned-husband, a doctor – and gives birth to their first daughter, Sama ("Sky") in 2015, which became the basis of For Sama. For covering the Siege of Aleppo, she won an International Emmy for her reporting, the first Syrian to do so. For Sama, directed with Edward Watts, won the Prix L'Œil d'or for best documentary at the 2019 Cannes Film Festival, receiving a six-minute standing ovation. At the 73rd British Academy Film Awards, For Sama became the most nominated documentary in the history of the British Academy Film Awards with four nominations, winning for Best Documentary. For Sama received the award for International Affairs Documentary at the AIBs 2020; Al-Kateab was interviewed for the AIBs Winners and Finalists book. Al-Kateab was on the list of the BBC's 100 Women announced on 23 November 2020. Two women from Syria made the list - the other was the plant virologist Safaa Kumani.

After fleeing Aleppo in December 2016, Al-Kateab, her husband, and their two daughters reside in the United Kingdom. In 2021, The Academy of Motion Picture Arts and Sciences selected Waad as the recipient of the Academy Gold Fellowship for Women.

== Awards ==
105+ Awards for FOR SAMA, which include:

- duPont-Columbia Award 2021
- Guldbagge Award for Best Foreign Film 2021
- CinEuphoria Award for Freedom of Expression 2021
- International Emmy Award for Best Documentary 2021
- British Academy of Film and Television 2020 for Best Documentary
- The AIBs 2020 International Affairs Documentary
- 4 British Independent Film Awards (BIFA) 2019 for: Best British Film, Best Documentary, Best Directors, Best Editing
- IDA Award for Best Feature Documentary 2019
- Special Jury Prize at SXSW Film Festival 2019
- Best European Documentary, European Film Awards, 2019
- Prix L’Œil d’Or for Best Documentary at Cannes Film Festival, 2019

=== Recognitions (FOR SAMA) ===
- Academy Award 2020 nomination for Best Documentary
- Triumph Award - Stylist Magazine
- Courage Under Fire Award - IDA
- Expression of Freedom Award - National Board of Review

=== Awards (other) ===
- Academy Gold Fellowship for Women International Award 2021
- BBC 100 Women List Nov 2020
- Time 100 Most Influential People in the World list 2020
- Citizenship Award P&V Foundation 2020
- Special Recognition Award / Thomson Foundation November 2017
- War Report / The Prix Bayeux-Calvados October 2017
- The International Emmy, news category / National Academy of TV Arts October 2017
- News Coverage – International / Royal Television Society RTS March 2017
- Young Talent of the year / Royal Television Society RTS March 2017
- Foreign Affairs Journalism / British Journalism Awards December 2016
- Gaby Rado Award for Best New Journalist / Amnesty International Awards December 2016
- Television News Award / Amnesty International Awards December 2016

=== Additional Awards ===
- Best TV News Awards / Prix Bayeux-Calvados October 2017
- Rory Peck Awards, news category / Rory Peck Trust October 2017
- Best Non-Scripted Online Short category / Broadcast Digital Awards July 2017
- Best Video Journalism / The Drum Online Media Awards June 2017
- News Award / One World Media Awards June 2017
- Camera Operator of the year / Royal Television Society RTS March 2017
- Independent film Award / Royal Television Society RTS March 2017
