= Humberto Palza =

Chilean politician

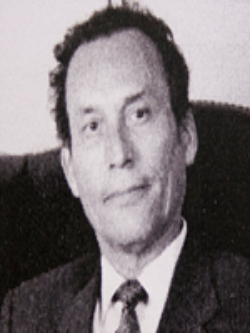

Member of the Senate of Chile
- In office 11 March 1990 – 11 March 1994
- Preceded by: District created
- Succeeded by: Sergio Bitar
- Constituency: 1st Circumscription

Member of the Chamber of Deputies
- In office 15 May 1969 – 11 September 1973
- Succeeded by: 1973 coup d'etat

Personal details
- Born: 25 November 1936 Arica, Chile
- Died: 6 May 1998 (aged 61) Arica, Chile
- Party: National Falange (1957); Christian Democratic Party (1957–1998)
- Spouse: Mónica Cordero
- Children: Five
- Parent(s): Humberto Palza; Ismenia Corvacho
- Education: Universidad Técnica del Estado (UTE)
- Occupation: Politician
- Profession: Teacher

Humberto Manuel Palza Corvacho (25 December 1936 – 6 May 1998) is a Chilean former parliamentarian.

== Biography ==
He was born in Arica on 25 December 1936. He was the son of Humberto Palza Boved and Ismenia Corvacho Corvacho.

On 25 December 1967, he married Mónica del Carmen Cordero Roura. He was the father of five children: Alejandra Mónica, Javiera Ismenia, Marcela Paz, Humberto Cristián, and Beatriz Graciela.

=== Professional career ===
He completed his primary education at the Azapa Primary School and his secondary education at Colegio San Vicente de Paul. After finishing his schooling, he enrolled at the Commercial Institute of Arica. He later studied English Pedagogy at the State Technical University, where he obtained the degree of State Teacher of English in 1960.

== Political career ==
He joined the National University Falange in 1957 and, in 1958, became a member of the Christian Democratic Party (PDC). He served as president of the Christian Democratic Youth of Arica between 1961 and 1962 and was also president of the Youth Defense of Arica Command. He was later appointed Provincial Councillor of the party and eventually became Provincial President.

During his tenure in party leadership, he participated in significant legal actions in defense of the community, including legal protections related to aerial fumigations over Arica to combat the Mediterranean fruit fly and the protection of the ecosystem of Chungará Lake, initiatives that received national and international attention.

He also served as Deputy Secretary General of the Central Unitary Workers’ Union (CUT) in Arica.

In 1963, he was elected municipal councillor of Arica for the 1963–1967 term and was re-elected for the 1967–1969 term. He also served as Secretary of the Arica Educational Integration Project.

In 1985, he promoted the movement to defend Chungará Lake by filing a legal protection action to suspend water extraction from the lake. The Supreme Court of Justice unanimously upheld the action.

For the national plebiscite held on 5 October 1988, he served as president of the “No” campaign command in Arica.

In the first parliamentary elections following the return to democracy, held on 14 December 1989, he ran as a candidate for the Senate representing the Christian Democratic Party for the 1st Constituency of the Tarapacá Region for the 1990–1994 term. He was elected with the highest vote share, obtaining 45,258 votes, equivalent to 27.99% of valid votes cast.

In 1993, he ran for re-election for the same constituency for the 1994–2002 term, obtaining 29,426 votes (18.19% of valid votes), but was not elected.

In 1994, he was appointed Ambassador to Caribbean countries, based in Guatemala. He also became the first representative of the Ministry of Foreign Affairs, with ambassadorial rank, in the Tarapacá Region, with the objective of strengthening and projecting the integration process of northern Chile with neighboring countries.

He died in Santiago on 6 May 1998.
