= Javier Aguirre (director) =

Spanish film director, writer and producer (1935–2019)

- Born: Javier Aguirre Fernández; 13 June 1935; San Sebastián, Spain
- Died: 4 December 2019 (aged 84); Madrid, Spain
- Spouses: Enriqueta Carballeira (m. 1966–1977): Esperanza Roy
- Children: Arantxa Aguirre

Javier Aguirre Fernández (13 June 1935 – 4 December 2019) was a Spanish film director, writer and producer.

== Biography and career ==
Aguirre was born in San Sebastián in Spain. Aguirre developed an interest in film at an early age. When he was a teenager, he started collaborating for entertainment magazines like Radiocinema, Film Ideal, and others. In 1955, when he was around 20 years old, he founded and directed the San Sebastián Film Club. From 1956 to 1957, Aguirre organized film courses and film festivals. During those years, he also studied at the Instituto de Investigaciones y Experiencias Cinematográficas (IIEC). He worked as an assistant director until he started directing his own short films in the 1960s.

He started his work as a director in 1961, directing a documentary short titled Pasajes tres, which received the Golden Shell at the San Sebastián International Film Festival. He had a prolific career, directing 45 feature films, 10 short films, 2 documentaries, and 25 documentary shorts. Aguirre also wrote and produced most of his films.

Spanish horror movie fans know him as the director of three popular Paul Naschy horror films, El jorobado de la Morgue (1973, aka Hunchback of the Morgue), El gran amor del conde Drácula (1973, aka Count Dracula's Great Love) and El asesino esta entre los trece (aka The Killer is One of the Thirteen).

Aguirre was married to actress Enriqueta Carballeira from 1966 to 1977. The couple had a daughter, Arantxa Aguirre, who also works as a director. Javier was married to actress Esperanza Roy when he died.

Aguirre died on 4 December 2019 in a Madrid hospital after a long illness. He was still married to actress Esperanza Roy at the time of his death.

== Filmography ==
Año	Película	Funciones
1965	España insólita	Director
1967	Los chicos con las chicas	Director
1968	Los que tocan el piano	Director
1968	Una vez al año, ser hippy no hace daño	Director
1969	Soltera y madre en la vida	Director
1970	Pierna creciente, falda menguante	Director
1970	El astronauta	Director
1970	De profesión sus labores	Director
1972	Soltero y padre en la vida	Director and screenwriter
1973	El asesino está entre los trece	Director
1973	El jorobado de la Morgue	Director
1974	El gran amor del conde Drácula	Director and screenwriter
1974	El insólito embarazo de los Martínez	Director
1975	El mejor regalo	Director
1977	Esposa de día, amante de noche	Director
1977	Carne apaleada	Director
1977	Acto de posesión	Director
1979	Rocky Carambola	Director
1980	La guerra de los niños	Director
1980	Los pecados de mamá	Director
1982	Las locuras de Parchís	Director and screenwriter
1982	Vida/Perra	Director
1982	En busca del huevo perdido	Director and screenwriter
1982	Ni te cases ni te embarques	Director and screenwriter
1983	Parchís entra en acción	Director
1983	Gente / Personas	Director
1986	La monja alférez	Director and screenwriter
1987	El polizón del Ulises	Director and screenwriter
1987	Continuum	Director
2000	Voz	Director
2002	Zero Infinito	Director
2003	Variaciones 1/113	Director
2006	Dispersión de la luz	Director
2006	Medea 2	Director
2009	Sol	Director

== Short films ==
- Tiempo de dos (1960)
- Pasajes tres (1961), (winner of the Golden Shell in the Best Short Film category at the San Sebastián Film Festival)
- A ras del río (1961)
- Tiempo de playa (1961)
- Espacio dos (1961)
- Playa insólita (1962)
- Tiempo abierto (1962), (award for Best Short Film in Spanish Language at the San Sebastián Film Festival)
- Vizcaya cuatro (1962)
- Toros tres (1962)
- Tiempo de pasión (1963)
- Blanco vertical (1963)
- Mujer contra toro (1963)
- Canto a la esperanza (1963)
- Artesanía en el tiempo (1964)
- Espacio muerto (1965)
- La España diferente (1969)
- Vau seis (1970)
- UTS cero (Realización I) (1970)
- Temporalidad interna (1970)
- Múltiples, número indeterminado (1970)
- Impulsos ópticos en progresión geométrica (realización II) (1970)
- Che Che Che (1970) (about Che Guevara)
- Fluctuaciones entrópicas (1971)
- Tercer plan de desarrollo económico y social (1972)
- Costa del Sol malagueña (1972)
- Tautólogos plus X (1974)
- Vibraciones oscilatorias (1975)
- Exosmosis (1975)
- Continuum I (1975)
- Underwelles (1975) (about Orson Welles)
