= For Sama =

2019 documentary film by Waad al-Kateab and Edward Watts

- Directed by: Waad Al-Kateab; Edward Watts
- Produced by: Waad Al-Kateab
- Starring: Hamza al-Kateab; Sama Al-Kateab; Waad Al-Kateab
- Cinematography: Waad Al-Kateab
- Edited by: Chloe Lambourne; Simon McMahon
- Music by: Nainita Desai
- Production companies: PBS Frontline; Channel 4 News; ITN Productions
- Distributed by: PBS Distribution (US); Republic Film Distribution (UK)
- Release dates: March 11, 2019 (SXSW); November 19, 2019 (PBS)
- Running time: 100 minutes
- Countries: Syria; United Kingdom; United States
- Languages: Syrian Arabic; English
- Box office: US$1.3 million

For Sama (Arabic: من أجل سما, romanized: min ʾajl Samā) is a 2019 documentary film produced and narrated by Waad Al-Kateab, and directed by Waad Al-Kateab and Edward Watts. The film focuses on Waad Al-Kateab's journey as a journalist and rebel in the Syrian uprising. Her husband is Hamza al-Kateab, one of the few doctors left in Aleppo, and they raise their daughter Sama Al-Kateab during the Syrian Civil War.

The film had its world premiere at the South by Southwest festival on March 11, 2019, where it won the Documentary Feature Competition's Grand Jury and Audience Awards.

For Sama made history when it was nominated in four categories in the BAFTA awards, making it the most nominated documentary ever. It was nominated for the Academy Award for Best Documentary Feature at the 92nd Academy Awards.

== Premise ==
The film shows Waad al-Kateab's life through five years in Aleppo, Syria before and during The Battle of Aleppo. An economics student at the University of Aleppo when the uprising began in 2011, we watch as she falls in love, gives birth to her first daughter Sama and navigates motherhood all while the conflict begins to engulf the city. She and her husband, a doctor at one of the few remaining hospitals in the city, face an agonising decision to flee to safety or stay behind to help the innocent victims of war.

== Cast ==
- Hamza al-Kateab
- Sama al-Kateab
- Waad al-Kateab

== Reception ==
=== Critical response ===
On the review aggregator Rotten Tomatoes, the film holds an approval rating of 98% based on 99 reviews, with an average rating of 9/10. The website's critical consensus reads, "As intimate as it is heartbreakingly resonant, For Sama powerfully distills the difficult choices faced by citizens of war-torn regions." Metacritic, which uses a weighted average, assigned the film a score of 89 out of 100, based on 18 critics, indicating "universal acclaim".

Ian Freer of Empire, wrote "It will break your heart", and he further added, "For Sama powerfully mixes the personal and the political to thought-provoking, emotional ends. The result is one of the best documentaries of 2019". David Jenkins of the Little White Lies wrote, "This tough but vital documentary depicts the savage bombardment of Aleppo from a female perspective". Jordan Mintzer of The Hollywood Reporter wrote, "[For Sama] The result is a series of deeply powerful images showing the human casualties of a war that most of us witnessed from our TV sets or computer screens, but that al-Kateab and her husband lived on a daily basis for many years". Guy Lodge of the Variety wrote, "This ragged, remarkable act of cinematic witnessing sees a young woman finding her voice – as an activist, as an artist and as a parent – above the crashing, whistling din of warfare. Amid a surfeit of devastating reports from the ruins, it's one we haven't yet heard".

=== Awards and nominations ===
For Sama made history by becoming the BAFTA's most-nominated feature documentary. The British Academy of Film and Television Arts announced the film has been nominated in four categories, Outstanding debut by a British writer, director or producer; Outstanding British film; Best film not in the English language and Best documentary. For Sama won multiple awards at the British Independent Film Awards in December 2019 including: best British independent film, best documentary, best director and best editing.

For Sama was granted "L'oeil d'or", the best documentary movie award in Cannes Film Festival in 2019. The documentary was nominated for an Oscar at the 92nd Academy Awards in the Documentary Feature category.

Award	Category	Recipient	Result	Ref.
Academy Awards	Best Documentary Feature	Waad Al-Kateab and Edward Watts	Nominated	
Alliance of Women Film Journalists	Best Documentary Feature Film	For Sama	Nominated	
Austin Film Critics Association	Best Documentary	Waad Al-Kateab and Edward Watts	Nominated	
British Academy Film Awards	Best Documentary	Waad Al-Kateab and Edward Watts	Won	
British Academy Film Awards	Best Film Not in the English Language	Waad Al-Kateab and Edward Watts	Nominated	
British Academy Film Awards	Outstanding British Film	Waad Al-Kateab and Edward Watts	Nominated	
British Academy Film Awards	Outstanding Debut by a British Writer, Director or Producer	Waad Al-Kateab and Edward Watts	Nominated	
British Independent Film Awards	Best Director	Waad Al-Kateab and Edward Watts	Won	
British Independent Film Awards	Best British Independent Film	Waad Al-Kateab and Edward Watts	Won	
British Independent Film Awards	Best Documentary	Waad Al-Kateab and Edward Watts	Won	
British Independent Film Awards	Best Editing	Chloe Lambourne and Simon McMahon	Won	
British Independent Film Awards	Best Music	Nainita Desai	Nominated	
56th Guldbagge Awards	Best Foreign Film	Waad Al-Kateab and Edward Watts	Won	
Hot Docs Canadian International Documentary Festival	Best International Feature Documentary, Special Jury Prize	For Sama	Won	
Independent Spirit Awards	Best Documentary Feature	Waad Al-Kateab and Edward Watts	Nominated	
Peabody Awards	Documentary	For Sama	Won	
38th Robert Awards	Best Non-English-language Feature	For Sama	Nominated	
Robert F. Kennedy Journalism Award	Seigenthaler Prize	For Sama	Won	
48th International Emmy Awards	Best Documentary	For Sama	Won	
Guldbagge	Best Foreign Film	For Sama	Won	
Sofia Documental	Audience Award	Waad Al-Kateab	Won	
P&V Foundation	Citizenship award	For Sama	Won	

== Social impact ==
As For Sama got a lot of international attention, Waad Al-Kateab launched an advocacy campaign in the name of Action for Sama to advocate for the civilians of Syria. Her campaign attracted the attention of some of the most internationally known actors and actresses.

People's emotional reaction to the film is what she hopes will prompt them to action, but for the decision makers and those who have power, she expects more than just emotions after seeing her film. "Many people came to me crying and said they are so sorry that they let that happen. [...] It shows you how many people care. But on the level of decision makers [...] We have tried so hard to push for action, do something, to make sure these things don't continue to happen. [...] If you are in a position where you can change something, I don't want your tears, I want you to do something, you can make a difference," says Waad Al Kateab quietly but firmly.

== See also ==
- Battle of Aleppo (2012–2016)
- Media coverage of the Syrian Civil War
- The Cave (2019 Syrian film)
- Notturno (film)
