= The Battle of Chile =

1975 film

- Directed by: Patricio Guzmán
- Written by: Jose Bartolome; Pedro Chaskel; Federico Elton; Julio García Espinosa; Patricio Guzmán
- Produced by: Patricio Guzmán
- Narrated by: Abilio Fernández
- Cinematography: Jorge Müller Silva
- Edited by: Pedro Chaskel
- Production company: Equipe Tercer Ano
- Running time: 263 minutes
- Countries: Chile; Cuba
- Language: Spanish

The Battle of Chile: The Struggle of an Unarmed People (Spanish: La batalla de Chile: La lucha de un pueblo sin armas) is a Chilean-Cuban documentary film, by Chilean filmmaker Patricio Guzmán, in three parts: The Insurrection of the Bourgeoisie (La insurrección de la burguesía 1975), The Coup d'état (El golpe de estado; 1976) and Popular Power (El poder popular; 1979).

A chronicle of the political tension in Chile in 1973 and of the military coup against the government of Salvador Allende, it won the Grand Prix in 1975 and 1976 at the Grenoble International Film Festival.

In 1997, Chile, Obstinate Memory was released and followed Guzmán back to Chile as he screened the three-part documentary to Chileans who had never seen it before.

== Background ==
The film opens in March 1973 with reporters asking people how they intend to vote in the coming congressional election. The election is taking place after Allende has been in office for over two years and has been trying to reorganize society along democratic socialist lines. His "Popular Unity" coalition was put into office with only a third of the popular vote. His efforts to nationalize certain industries have met with both internal and foreign opposition, and Chile is suffering economic deprivations.

In the 1973 Chilean parliamentary election, Allende makes gains to 43.4 percent of the votes, though the opposition bloc is strong too, up to 56 percent. The film has street interviews, speeches, violent confrontations, the mobs, and meetings, the parades with workers chanting. Part One finishes with newsreel footage from an Argentine cameraman Leonardo Henrichsen who was photographing street skirmishes. A soldier takes aim and kills the cameraman, and the image spins skyward.

Part Two - "The Coup d'état" begins with the right wing violence of the winter of 1973 against the government. Army troops seize control of downtown Santiago - but the attempted coup is snuffed out in a few hours. "The film leaps from one group to another ... It shows the different elements in the explosive situation with so much clarity that it's a Marxist tract in which the contradictions of capitalism have sprung to life. We actually see the country cracking open. Step by step, the legal government is overthrown."

Everybody in Chile seems to know the coup d'état is coming and talk about it openly - yet the people who have the most to lose can't get together enough to do anything. Allende's naval aide-de-camp Arturo Araya is killed, and the camera moves around the funeral attendees - General Augusto Pinochet among them. In July, the truck owners, funded by the CIA, begin their long strike, which paralyzes the distribution of food, gasoline, and fuel, and there is a call for Allende to resign. Instead, Allende holds a rally - around 800,000 people arrive, but they have no weapons. On September 11, the Navy institutes the coup d'état, and the Air Force bombs the state radio station. The palace is bombarded from the air. The chiefs of the junta on television are seen announcing they'll return the country to order after three years of "Marxist cancer".

Part Three - "Popular Power" takes place in 1972-3, prior to the previous two installments. It primarily focuses on the workers' response to the "insurrection of the bourgeoise" captured in part 1. The workers respond to a strike of the employers and middle-class employees by occupying their factories and, as the strike is prolonged, attempting to run them themselves (autogestion). This leads to the formation of cordones industriales ('industrial belts', a form of workers' council) and opens up a debate on the left about the future of socialism and workers' power in Chile. The film features extensive interviews with Chilean industrial workers.

== Chile, Obstinate Memory (1996) ==
In Chile, Obstinate Memory, Guzmán explores the idea of identity and memory as it relates to the Chilean public. As opposed to The Battle of Chile, Chile, Obstinate Memory focuses more on the personal reflections of the filmmaker on returning to his home country. Whereas the original documentary is in the form of cinema verité, Chile, Obstinate Memory is a personal essay film Guzmán interviews people involved in the making of The Battle of Chile, speaks with Allende’s former guards, reflects on his own time being held by the military government, and overall focuses on the individual experiences under such a regime. The film explores the identity of the Chilean people in regards to the political changes of the nation during and after the Pinochet regime.

Guzmán struggled with the decision to make a personal essay film. In an interview with Jorge Ruffinelli, the filmmaker states that he had planned to go back to Chile and producer Yves Jeanneau suggested that Guzmán make his trip the subject of a new film. According to Guzmán, “This frightened me too much, however, to appear as the central focus of a film. So I made the suggestion it would be better to take advantage of my trip looking for the original characters of The Battle of Chile. That jelled and so the project began. I wrote the first synopsis, with a real lack of confidence because the "personal tone" wasn't convincing me.”

Eventually the filmmaker found the way to tell this compelling story. Previous to the beginning of the shoot, the director was screening his documentary at a film school in Santiago. As the screening ended, Guzmán saw no reaction to his film, “no one turned on the light, and no one applauded. I thought that I had picked the wrong film and said to myself, ´these kids must be children of parents who detest the Allende period´, and started moving to the back of the room to turn on the light, as I tried to think of some formula to continue the class. How great was my surprise when I discovered the faces of these young people, all crying, without exception. No one could articulate a single word. In that moment, I understood that the main device of the film had to be the showings of The Battle.”

Guzmán wanted to film the reaction of young students to the screening of The Battle of Chile, just as he had experience before the production of Obstinate Memory. He requested permission from 40 schools to do this but only 4 agreed. According to Guzmán, the rest of the schools refused because they were concerned about traumatizing the students and some suggested that it was better to forget the past.

== Critical reception ==
Tim Allen in Village Voice - "The major political film of our times - a magnificent achievement." Pauline Kael in The New Yorker - " How could a team of five - some with no previous film experience - working with ... one Éclair camera, one Nagra sound recorder, two vehicles...and a package of black-and-white film stock sent to them by the French documentarian Chris Marker produce a work of this magnitude? The answer has to be partly, at least; through Marxist discipline ... The young Chilean director and his associates had a sense of purpose. The twenty hours of footage they shot had to be smuggled out of the country..the cameraman, Jorge Müller, hasn't been heard of since his imprisonment. The others fled separately, assembled in Cuba, and together with a well-known Chilean film editor Pedro Chaskel, ... worked on the movie ... Aesthetically, this is a major film, and that gives force even to the patterning of its charges ... It needs to be seen on public television, with those [U.S.] government officials who formed policy toward Allende explaining what interests they believed they were furthering." Andy Beckett in The Guardian; "The film becomes, in part, a study of conservatism and what happens when it is threatened. [-]Pinochet's slyness is well illustrated by a glimpse of him a few months before the coup, sunglasses on, helmet pulled down, dressed like an ordinary soldier as he saunters amicably along with some other officers, who are still loyal to the government and have just put down a premature army rebellion. Meanwhile, the difference between Allende's "Chilean road to socialism" and more authoritarian, Soviet-inspired versions - a difference denied to this day by Pinochet's supporters - is made disarmingly clear by a confrontation between Allende and a crowd of left-wingers, who are chanting for him to close down parliament. He refuses, and the protesting whistles are fierce for a time. Then the crowd goes quiet and listens."

== See also ==
- Cinema of Chile
