= Dawson Island =

Island in the Strait of Magellan, part of Chile

Nickname: Isla Dawson
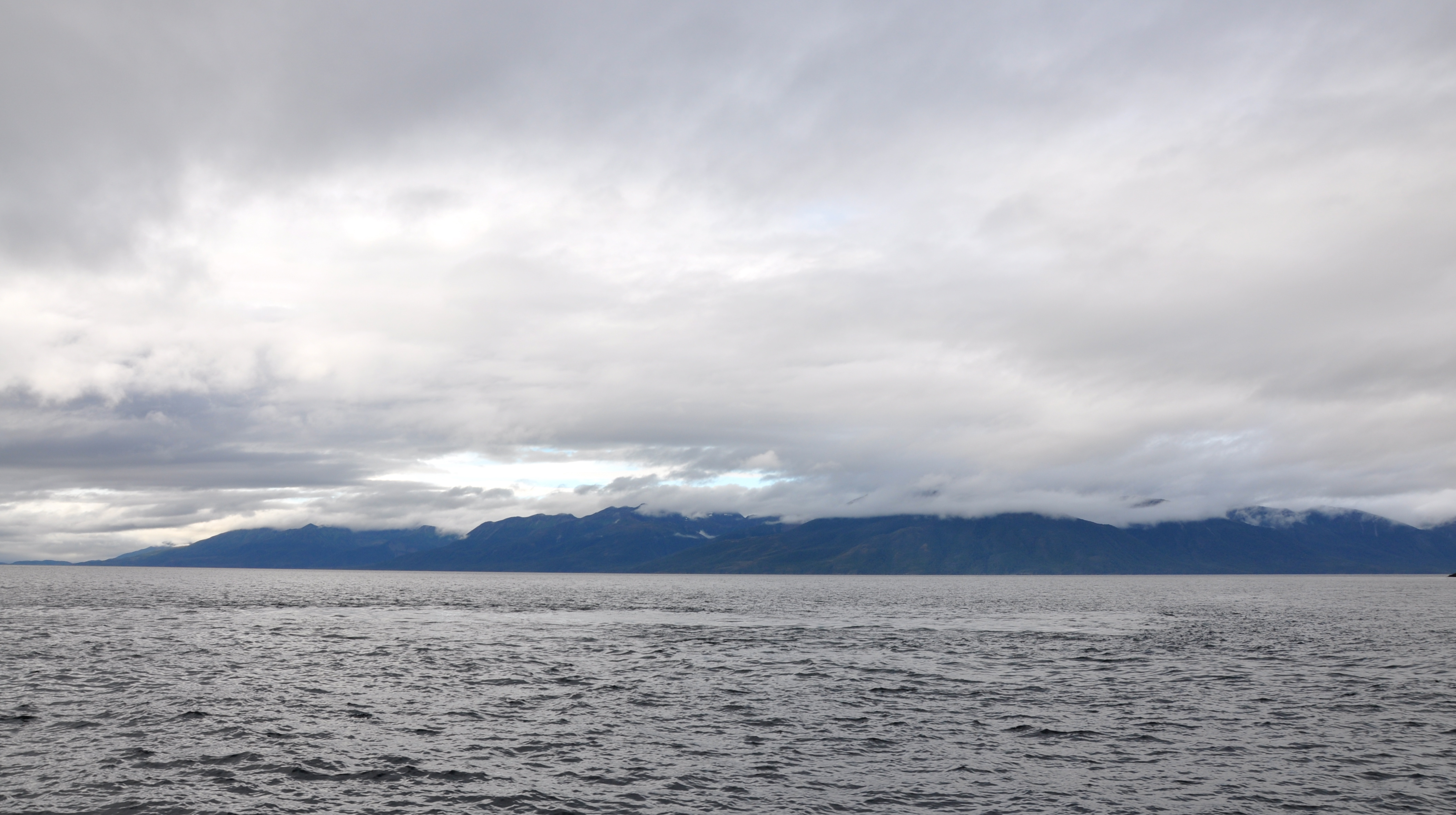
- Dawson Island West Coast

- Location within Southern Patagonia

Geography
- Coordinates: 53.97°S 70.58°W
- Archipelago: Tierra del Fuego
- Adjacent to: Strait of Magellan
- Area: 1,290 km^{2} (500 sq mi)

Administration
- Chile
- Region: Magallanes Region
- Province: Magallanes
- Commune: Punta Arenas

Demographics
- Population: 415

Additional information
- NGA UFI=-879405

Dawson Island (Spanish: Isla Dawson) is an island in the Strait of Magellan that forms part of the Tierra del Fuego archipelago, 100 km south of the city of Punta Arenas in Chile, and part of the Municipality of Punta Arenas. It is located southeast of Brunswick Peninsula. It is often lashed with harsh Antarctic weather. The settlements are Puerto Harris, Puerto San Antonio and Puerto Almeida.

== History ==
This area was inhabited for thousands of years by the indigenous peoples. At the time of European encounter, the Kawésqar lived on the island (they were called the Alcalufe by the Yahgan and the Europeans adopted that term). They lived west of the Yahgan and throughout the islands west of Tierra del Fuego.

Beginning in the late 19th century, Europeans began to settle in the region, developing large sheep ranches on the main island. Miners also flocked to the area in search of gold. Chile used Dawson Island for an internment camp for the Selkʼnam and other native people, to get them out of areas that settlers were trying to develop. Major sheep ranchers hired armed men to hunt down the indigenous people for bounty in the Selkʼnam genocide, as they persisted on hunting in their former territory and considered sheep as game.

In 1890, the Chilean government granted Salesian missionaries from Italy a 20-year concession to Dawson Island to educate, care for, and try to assimilate indigenous peoples into European-Chilean culture. One of the structures from the Salesian operation remains. It has been designated a Chilean national monument.

After the 1973 Chilean coup d'état, the military dictatorship of Augusto Pinochet used the island to house political prisoners suspected of being communist activists, including government ministers and close friends of the deposed President Salvador Allende, most notably Orlando Letelier, Luis Corvalán, Clodomiro Almeyda and José Tohá. They were under the strict control of the Chilean Navy as each individual case was investigated. In addition, according to an International Red Cross report in 1974 and the Report of the Chilean National Commission on Truth and Reconciliation (Rettig Report) some 99 political detainees were held here who were sentenced to forced labor. Others have estimated that as many as 400 prisoners were held at the two camps. Members of the International Red Cross, BBC, and Brazilian press corps were permitted to visit the camps. In 1974 the military said they had transferred elsewhere or released detainees from both camps.

In September 2009 director Miguel Littín released a film called Dawson Isla 10. It was based on a memoir of the same name written by Sergio Bitar, a former political prisoner on the island during the Augusto Pinochet regime.

== See also ==
- Media related to Dawson Island at Wikimedia Commons
