= Beyond My Grandfather Allende =

2015 film

- Directed by: Marcia Tambutti Allende
- Release dates: 17 May 2015 (Cannes); 3 September 2015 (Chile)
- Running time: 90 minutes
- Countries: Chile; Mexico
- Language: Spanish

Beyond My Grandfather Allende (Spanish: Allende, mi abuelo Allende) is a 2015 Chilean-Mexican documentary film directed by Marcia Tambutti Allende. It was screened in the Directors' Fortnight section at the 2015 Cannes Film Festival where it won L'Œil d'or for best documentary film.

== Plot ==
Marcia desires to break with her family's tradition of not speaking about their tragic past. It has been 35 years since the coup d'état in Chile that overthrew her grandfather, Salvador Allende. Marcia believes that it is time to recover the images of their daily life that were lost during the coup and to uncover the intimate past that has been submerged under the political significance of Allende's exile and the pain of her family.

Marcia addresses the complexities of irreparable losses and the role of memory across three generations of an iconic family. Her transparent perspective makes viewers feel they're witnessing history.
