= Patricio Guzmán =

Chilean documentary film director (1941–2026)

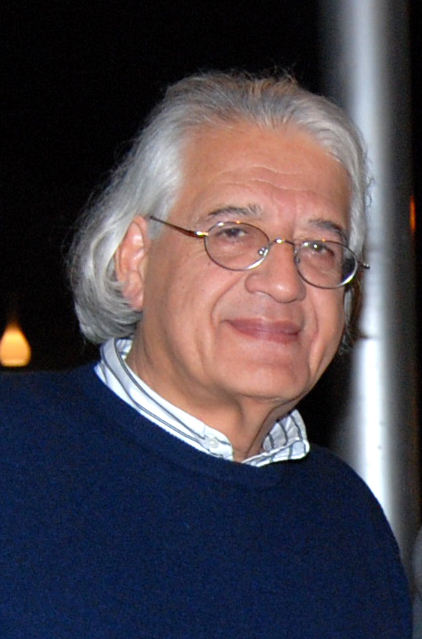
- Guzmán in 2010
- Born: Patricio Guzmán Lozanes; August 11, 1941; Santiago, Chile
- Died: September 15, 2026 (aged 85); Paris, France
- Occupations: director, screenwriter, cinematographer, actor
- Years active: 1964–2026
- Website: www.patricioguzman.com

Patricio Guzmán Lozanes (August 11, 1941 – September 15, 2026) was a Chilean documentary and feature film director, and screenwriter. He is most known for his film trilogy The Battle of Chile (1975–1979) and more recently for another trilogy; Nostalgia for the Light (2010), The Pearl Button (2015) and The Cordillera of Dreams (2019).

== Career ==
Guzmán also taught documentary film classes in Europe and Latin America, and was the founder and director of the International Documentary Festival of Santiago (FIDOCS). He lived in France. His 1983 film The Compass Rose was entered into the 13th Moscow International Film Festival. His 2015 film The Pearl Button screened in the main competition section of the 65th Berlin International Film Festival. He received a nomination for the Writers Guild of America Award for Best Documentary Screenplay for his 2010 film Nostalgia for the Light.

== Death ==
Guzmán died from cardiorespiratory arrest on September 15, 2026, at a hospital in Paris. He was 85.

== Filmography ==
- La Tortura y otras formas de diálogo – 1968
- El Paraíso ortopédico – 1969
- Primer año – 1971
- La Respuesta de octubre – 1972
- La Batalla de Chile: La insurrección de la burguesía – 1975
- La Batalla de Chile: El golpe de estado – 1977
- La Batalla de Chile: El poder popular – 1979
- The Compass Rose (Rosa de los vientos) – 1983
- En nombre de Dios – 1987
- La Cruz del Sur – 1992
- Pueblo en vilo – 1995
- Chile, Obstinate Memory (Chile, la memoria obstinada) – 1997
- La Isla de Robinson Crusoe – 1999
- Invocación – 2000
- Le Cas Pinochet – 2001
- Madrid – 2002
- Salvador Allende – 2004
- Mon Jules Verne – 2005 (TV)
- Nostalgia for the Light (Nostalgia de la luz) – 2010
- The Pearl Button (El botón de nácar) – 2015
- The Cordillera of Dreams (La Cordillera de los sueños) – 2019
- My Imaginary Country (Mi país imaginario) – 2022

== Awards and nominations ==
| Year | Award | Category | Work | Result | Ref. |
|---|---|---|---|---|---|
| 1975 | French Syndicate of Cinema Critics Awards | Best Short Film | The Battle of Chile | Won | |
| 1998 | Hot Docs Canadian International Documentary Festival | Best Canadian Feature Documentary | Chile, Obstinate Memory | Won | |
| 1999 | Gemini Awards | Best Direction in a Documentary Program or Series | Chile, Obstinate Memory | Nominated | |
| 2004 | Goya Awards | Best Documentary | Salvador Allende | Nominated | |
| 2006 | Pedro Sienna Awards | Best Feature Length Fiction, Animated, or Documentary Film | Salvador Allende | Nominated | |
| 2006 | Pedro Sienna Awards | Best Direction | Salvador Allende | Nominated | |
| 2010 | European Film Awards | Best Documentary | Nostalgia for the Light | Won | |
| 2011 | Writers Guild of America Awards | Best Documentary Screenplay | Nostalgia for the Light | Nominated | |
| 2011 | Altazor Awards | Best Direction - Documentary Film | Nostalgia for the Light | Won | |
| 2011 | Pedro Sienna Awards | Best Feature Length Documentary | Nostalgia for the Light | Won | |
| 2013 | News & Documentary Emmy Awards | Best Documentary | Nostalgia for the Light | Nominated | |
| 2013 | News & Documentary Emmy Awards | Outstanding Historical Programming - Long Form | Nostalgia for the Light | Nominated | |
| 2015 | Berlin International Film Festival | Golden Bear | The Pearl Button | Nominated | |
| 2015 | Berlin International Film Festival | Silver Bear for Best Script | The Pearl Button | Won | |
| 2015 | Berlin International Film Festival | Prize of the Ecumenical Jury - Competition | The Pearl Button | Won | |
| 2015 | Fénix Awards | Best Documentary Film | The Pearl Button | Nominated | |
| 2015 | Fénix Awards | Trajectory Award | Himself | Won | |
| 2016 | César Awards | Best Documentary Film | The Pearl Button | Nominated | |
| 2016 | Lumière Awards | Best Documentary | The Pearl Button | Won | |
| 2016 | Pedro Sienna Awards | Best Feature Length Documentary | The Pearl Button | Nominated | |
| 2016 | Platino Awards | Best Documentary | The Pearl Button | Won | |
| 2019 | Cannes Film Festival | Golden Eye | The Cordillera of Dreams | Won | |
| 2020 | 45th César Awards | Best Documentary Film | The Cordillera of Dreams | Nominated | |
| 2022 | Goya Awards | Best Ibero-American Film | The Cordillera of Dreams | Won | |
| 2022 | Cannes Film Festival | Golden Eye | My Imaginary Country | Nominated | |
| 2022 | Jerusalem Film Festival | Best Documentary Film | My Imaginary Country | Won | |
| 2022 | Platino Awards | Best Documentary | My Imaginary Country | Nominated | |
