= Sergio Bitar =

Chilean politician

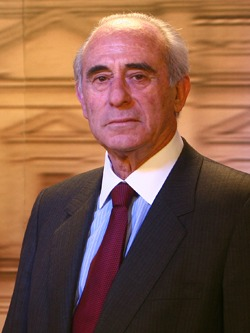

Minister of Public Works
- In office 11 January 2008 – 11 March 2010
- Preceded by: Eduardo Bitrán
- Succeeded by: Hernán de Solminihac

President of the Party for Democracy
- In office 17 Julio 2006 – 11 January 2008
- Preceded by: Víctor Barrueto
- Succeeded by: Pepe Auth
- In office 3 April 1997 – 2 May 2000
- Preceded by: Jorge Schaulsohn
- Succeeded by: Guido Girardi
- In office 11 September 1992 – 3 October 1994
- Preceded by: Erich Schnake
- Succeeded by: Jorge Schaulsohn

Minister of Education
- In office 3 March 2003 – 14 December 2005
- Preceded by: Mariana Aylwin
- Succeeded by: Marigen Hornkohl

Member of the Senate of Chile
- In office 11 March 1994 – 11 March 2002
- Preceded by: Humberto Palza
- Succeeded by: Fernando Flores
- Constituency: 1st Circunscription

Minister of Mining
- In office 11 March 1973 – 5 July 1973
- Preceded by: Claudio Sepúlveda Donoso
- Succeeded by: Pedro Felipe Ramírez

Personal details
- Born: 30 December 1940 (age 85) Santiago, Chile
- Party: Christian Democratic; Christian Left; Socialist Party; Party for Democracy
- Spouse: María Eugenia Hirmas
- Children: Three
- Parent(s): Julia Chacra Chacra; Nazmir Bitar
- Education: University of Chile (B.Sc); Harvard University (PhD)
- Occupation: Politician, Researcher and Scholar
- Profession: Economist

Sergio Bitar Chacra (born 30 December 1940) is a Chilean economist and politician who served as minister during the governments of Salvador Allende (1970−1973) and Michelle Bachelet (2006–2010).

Civil engineer, economist, and politician of the Party for Democracy. He served as Senator for the 1st Senatorial Constituency, Tarapacá Region, between 1994 and 2002. He was Minister of Mining from 27 March 1973 to 5 July 1973 during the government of President Salvador Allende.

He later served as Minister of Education between 3 March 2003 and 14 December 2005 under President Ricardo Lagos, and as Minister of Public Works from 11 January 2008 to 11 March 2010 during the government of President Michelle Bachelet. He was President of the Party for Democracy for three terms: 1992–1994; 1997–2000; and 2006–2008.

== Biography ==
=== Family and youth ===
He was born on 30 December 1940 in Santiago, Chile. He is the son of Nazmi Bitar Chacra and Julia Chacra Chacra, who immigrated to Chile from Syria and Lebanon, in 1927. He is the eldest of four siblings: Lorenzo, Virginia Isabel, and Carlos.

In 1964, he married María Eugenia Hirmas Rubio, a sociologist and Director of the Sociocultural Area of the Presidency between 2007 and 2010. He is the father of Javier, Rodrigo, and Patricia.

=== Professional career ===
He completed his primary education at Andrew Carnegie College and his secondary education at the Instituto Nacional, both in Santiago. He later entered the Faculty of Physical and Mathematical Sciences of the University of Chile, graduating as a Civil Engineer in 1963. Due to his outstanding academic performance, in 1965 he received the “Marcos Orrego Puelma” award from the Institute of Engineers, granted to the best student.

In 1965, he traveled to Paris to pursue further specialization and began a one-year postgraduate program in Economic Theory at the Centre d'Études de Programmes Économiques. He returned to Chile in 1966 and served until 1968 as Director of the Department of Industries and Planning Center of the Faculty of Physical and Mathematical Sciences of the University of Chile.

In September 1971, he traveled to Boston, United States, where he completed a master's degree in economics at Harvard University. In parallel, he worked as head professor of the Industrial Planning area of the Department of Industries.

During his exile, between 1975 and 1976 he served as a visiting researcher at the Harvard Institute for International Development. Later, between 1982 and 1983, he was again a visiting researcher, this time at the Wilson International Center for Scholars of the Smithsonian Institution in Washington, D.C., until he was authorized to return to Chile.

He also worked as a researcher at the Central University of Venezuela and supervised civil engineering theses at the Andrés Bello Catholic University.

Between 2011 and 2015, together with Professor Abraham Lowenthal, founding president of the Pacific Council on International Policy, he directed the project Transitions to Democracy: Lessons Learned of the International Institute for Democracy and Electoral Assistance (IDEA), conducting thirteen interviews with presidents from nine countries in Europe, Asia, Africa, and Latin America who led major democratic transitions.

== Political career ==
=== Beginnings: Frei and Allende ===
He began his political career during the government of President Eduardo Frei Montalva, when he was appointed Manager of Industrial Planning of the Corporation for the Promotion of Production (CORFO), a position he held between 1968 and 1970.

During the 1970 presidential elections, he collaborated in drafting the economic program of the campaign of Christian Democratic candidate Radomiro Tomic.

On 24 October 1971, he participated in the founding of the Christian Left Party. In 1972, when the Christian Left joined the government of President Salvador Allende, he became a member of the Executive Secretariat of the Economic Committee of Ministers. On 27 March 1973, he was appointed Minister of Mining, serving until 20 June 1973.

On 29 May 1973, the opposition presented a constitutional accusation against him and the Minister of Labour and Social Security, Luis Figuera Mazuela, which was upheld by the Senate on 20 June 1973, resulting in their removal from office in accordance with the Constitution in force at the time.

=== Pinochet era and exile ===
Following the 1973 coup d’état, he was detained by agents of the dictatorship after voluntarily presenting himself at the Military School, as ordered by the Military Junta. He was transferred to Isla Dawson near Punta Arenas, where he remained for nine months. In May 1974, he was transferred to the Puchuncaví political detention camp and later to Ritoque, near Valparaíso, where he remained until 30 September 1974, when he was taken to his home under house arrest.

In November 1974, he was released and sent into exile. He traveled with his family to the United States and in 1976 to Caracas, Venezuela. In 1982, he moved to Washington, D.C., to the Wilson Center for International Studies after being invited to conduct research and write on United States–Latin America relations.

During this period, he worked as a researcher at Harvard and in Venezuela, and in professional roles related to his field. In 1976, in Caracas, he took charge of Colomural de Venezuela, a wallpaper manufacturing company previously established by one of his brothers, with whom he partnered.

=== Transition to democracy: 1985–1990 ===
In February 1984, the military government authorized his return to Chile. The following month, he returned temporarily with his wife, and later that year received confirmation that the authorization was permanent, returning definitively with his entire family in August 1984.

In 1985, he re-entered public and political life. He served as vice president of the opposition newspaper Fortín Mapocho until 1987. He was also elected director of manufacturing and real estate companies and served as president of the Latin American Center for Economy and International Politics (CLEPI) for eight years until 1993.

He became involved in the board of the Paz Ciudadana Foundation and the editorial councils of publications such as Cono Sur, Apsi, and Mensaje. He also played a key role in the formation of the Party for Democracy.

=== Democratic era ===
Between 1988 and 1989, he consolidated his political career by serving as coordinator of the Program Commission of the Party for Democracy and presiding over the party's parliamentary campaign in 1989. In 1990, he became vice president and Secretary General of the party (1990–1992), and later served three terms as President of the Party for Democracy: 1992–1994; 1997–2000; and 2006–2008. He presided over the party during the presidential campaign of Ricardo Lagos.

In the parliamentary elections of 11 December 1993, he was elected Senator for the 1st Senatorial Constituency, Tarapacá Region, for the 1994–2002 term, obtaining the highest vote with 63,810 ballots, representing 39.44% of the valid votes. At the end of his term, he did not seek re-election and was replaced by Fernando Flores.

Between 3 March 2003 and 14 December 2005, he served as Minister of Education under President Ricardo Lagos. As minister, he participated in the APEC Innovation in Education Forum held in Beijing on 12 January 2004.

On 11 January 2008, President Michelle Bachelet appointed him Minister of Public Works, a position he held until 11 March 2010.

In 2015, he was appointed representative of the President of the Republic to the University Council of the University of Chile, a role he held until December 2018. He has also served on governing councils of the University of Santiago, Chile, Universidad Mayor, and the Temuco Catholic University.

In 2023, he ran as a candidate for the Constitutional Council representing the Party for Democracy on the Todo por Chile list in the Tarapacá Region, but was not elected, obtaining 4.99% of the vote.
