= L'Œil d'or =

Cannes Film Festival documentary film award

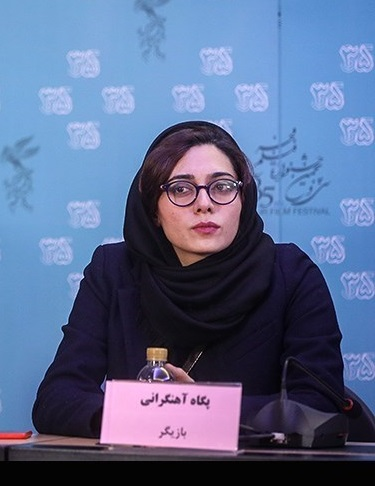
- 2026 recipient: Pegah Ahangarani
- Awarded for: Best Documentary
- Location: Cannes
- Country: France
- Presented by: Civil Society of Multimedia Authors; Institut national de l'audiovisuel; Cannes Film Festival
- First award: 2015
- Currently held by: Pegah Ahangarani for Rehearsals for a Revolution (2026)
- Website: https://loeildor.scam.fr/en/

L'Œil d'or ([lœj dɔʁ], "The Golden Eye") is a documentary film award created in 2015. It is awarded to the best documentary presented in one of the sections of the Cannes Film Festival (Official Selection, Directors' Fortnight, Critics' Week, and Acid).

== History ==
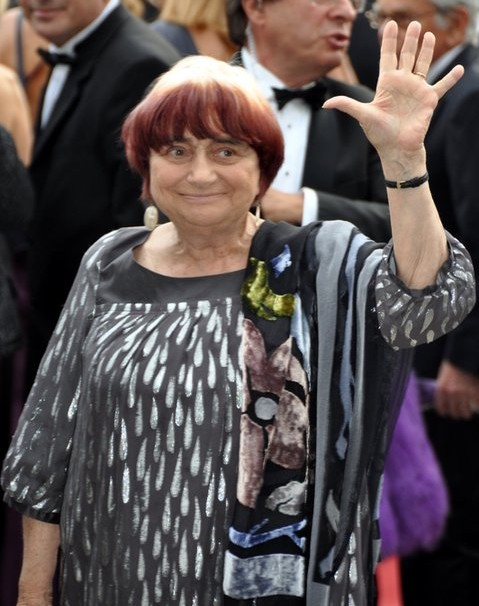
Agnès Varda won for Faces Places (2017)

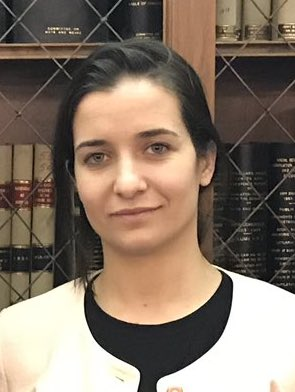
Waad Al-Kateab won for For Sama (2019)

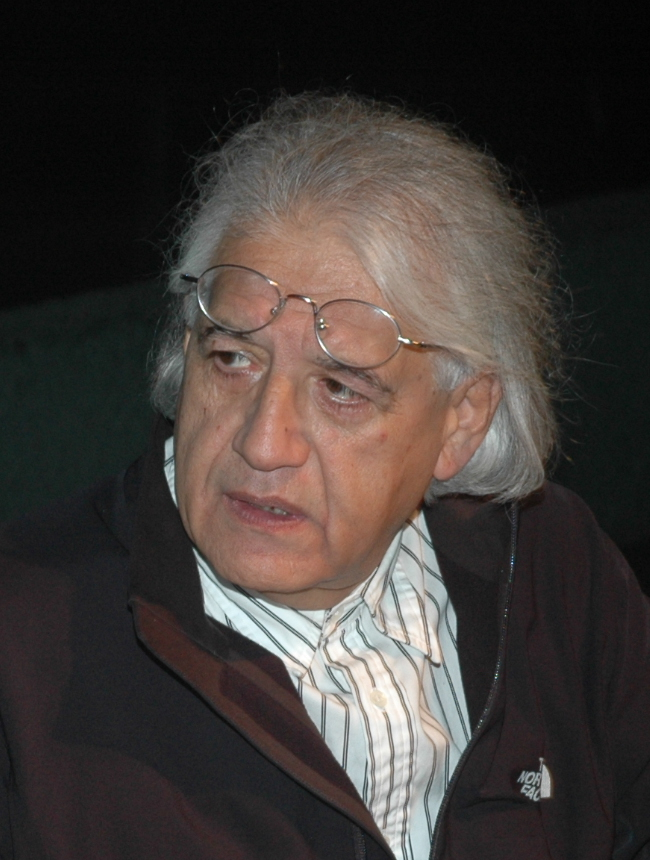
Patricio Guzmán won for The Cordillera of Dreams (2019)

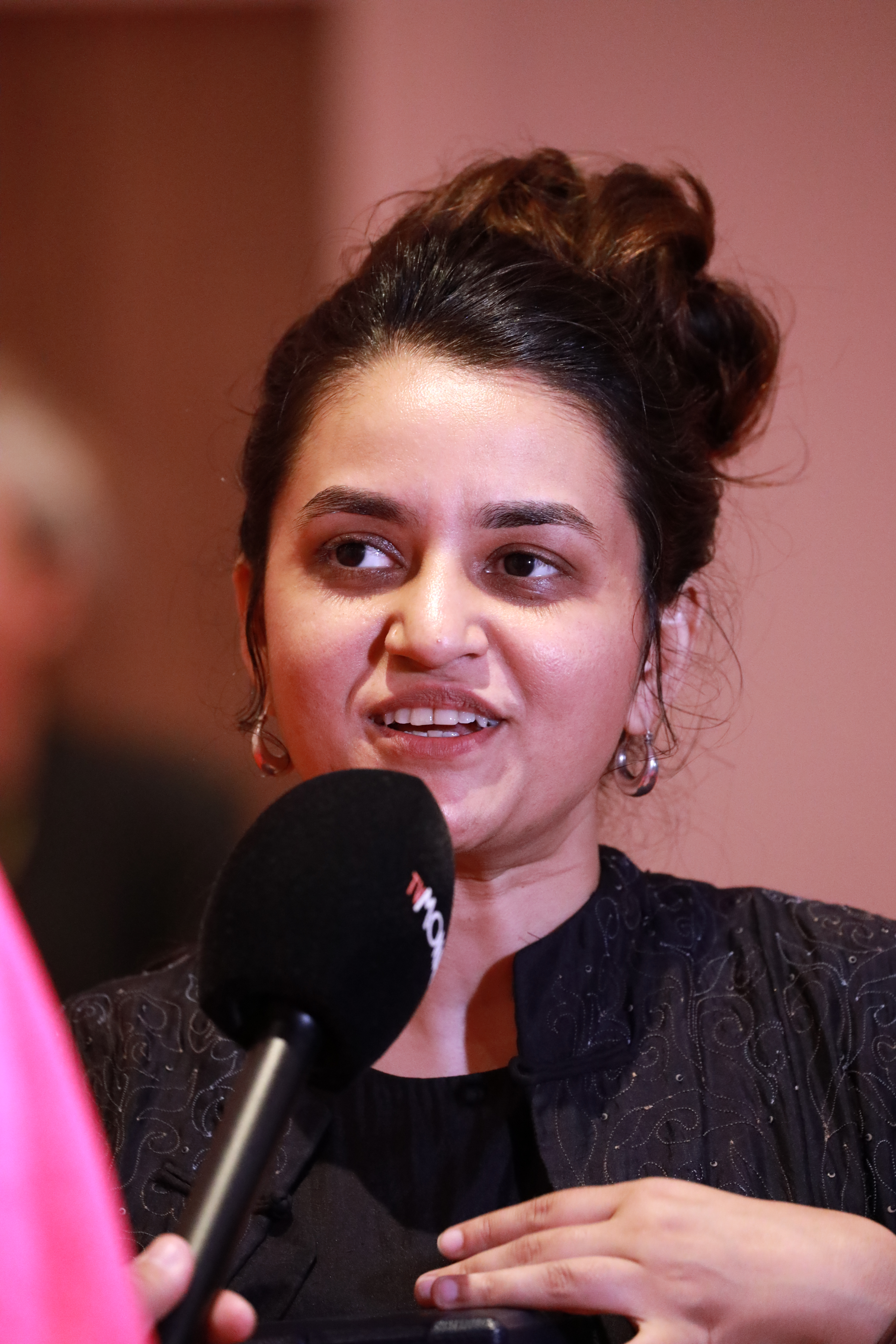
Payal Kapadia won for A Night of Knowing Nothing (2021)

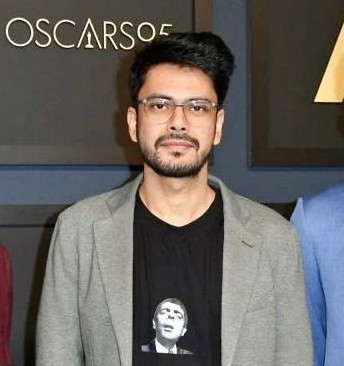
Shaunak Sen won for All That Breathes (2022)

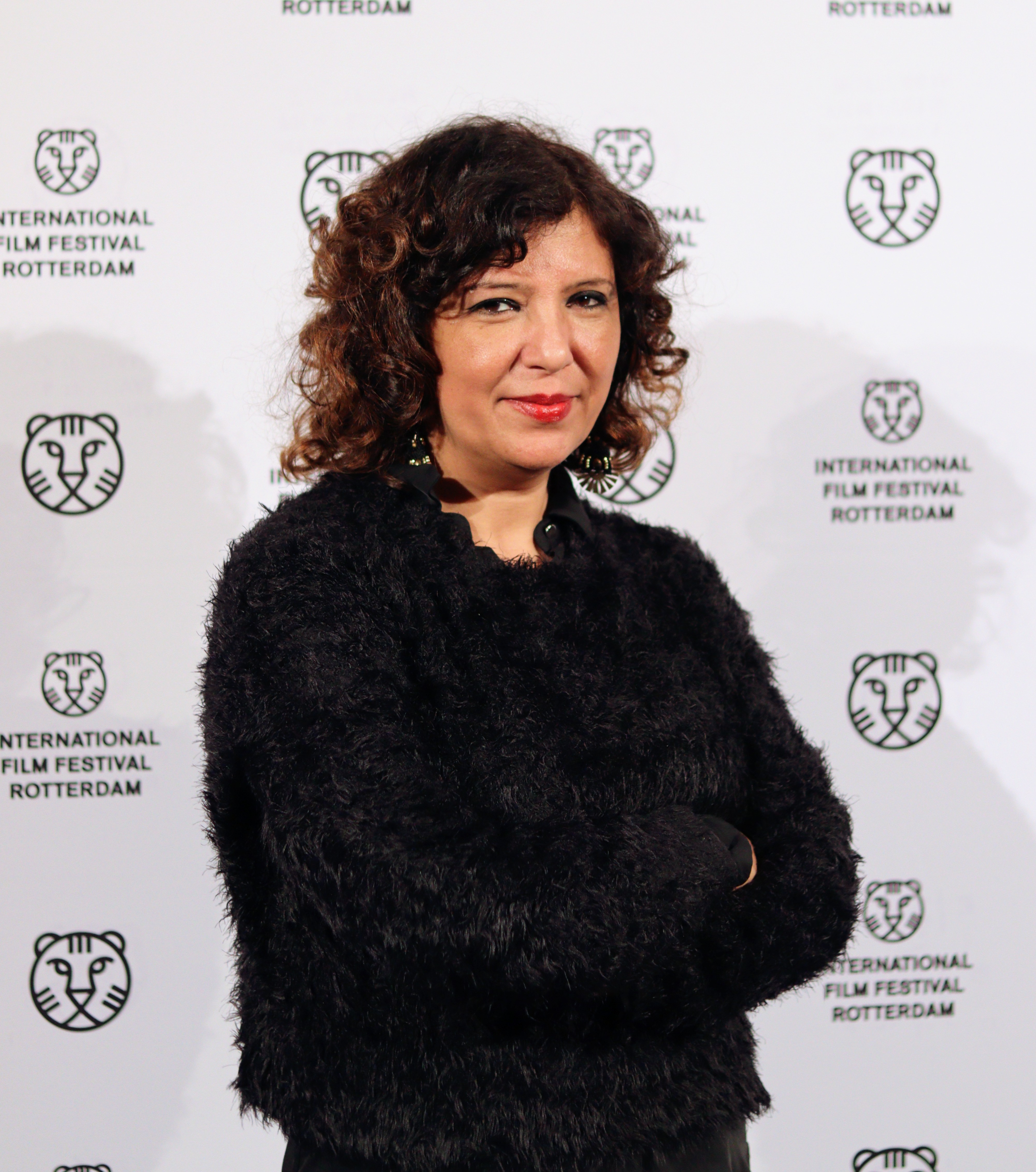
Kaouther Ben Hania won for Four Daughters (2023)

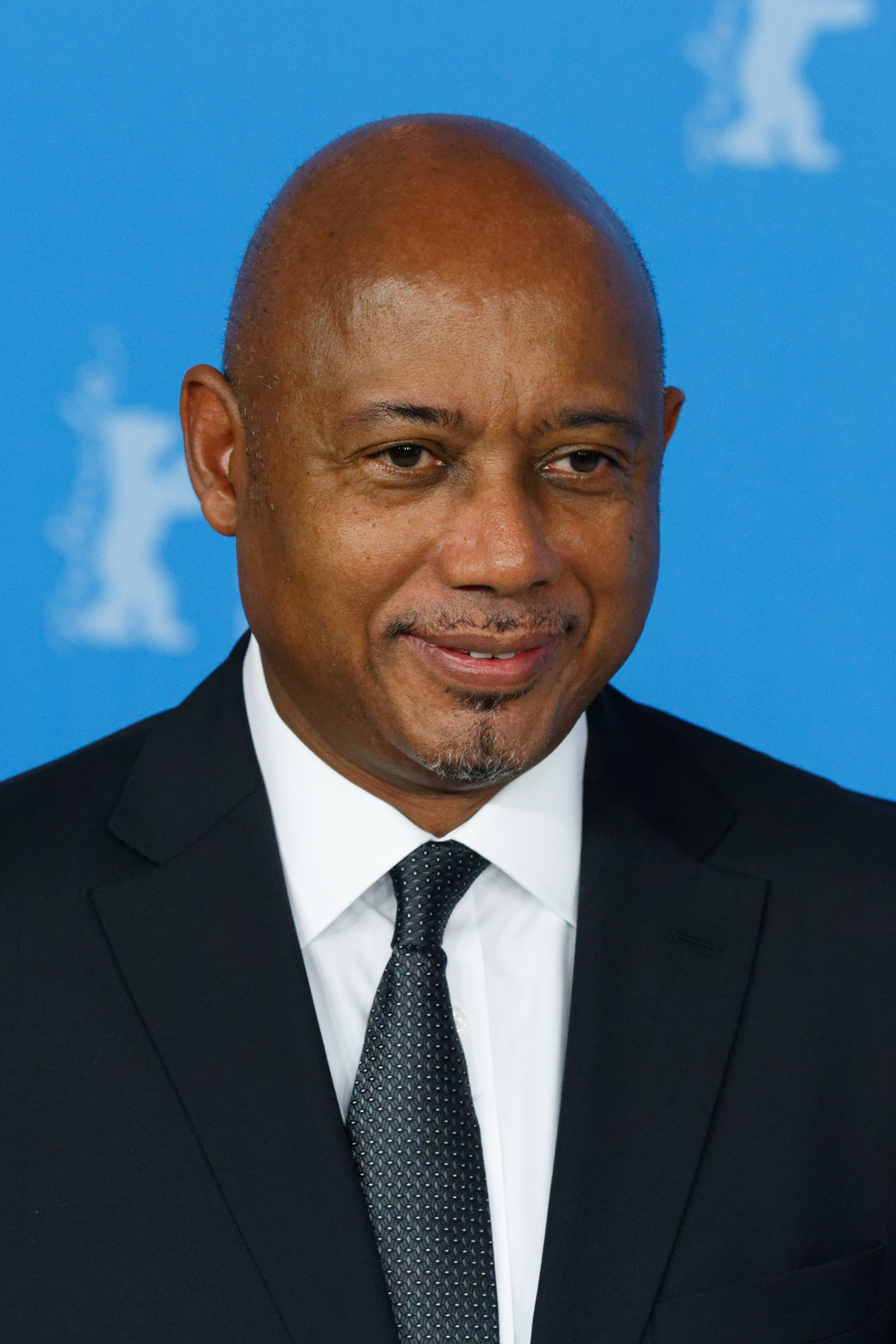
Raoul Peck won for Ernest Cole: Lost and Found (2024)

Initiated by the Civil Society of Multimedia Authors (SCAM - Société Civile des Auteurs Multimédia) and its president Julie Bertuccelli, the prize is awarded in partnership with the Institut national de l'audiovisuel with the support of Cannes Film Festival and its General Delegate Thierry Frémaux. Since 2017, the Audiens Cultural Personal Joint Group has also been a partner.

The €5,000 prize is presented to the director of the winning film at an official ceremony in Cannes. It was presented for the first time on 23 May 2015 at the Palais des Festivals.

The jury is usually headed by renowned documentary filmmakers, which generally also award a special mention to the runner-up film.

Marcia Tambutti Allende's Beyond My Grandfather Allende, selected to the Directors' Fortnight section, was the first winner at the 2015 Cannes Film Festival.

=== Jury Presidents ===
Year	Name	Nationality
2015	Rithy Panh	Cambodia
2016	Gianfranco Rosi	Italy
2017	Sandrine Bonnaire	France
2018	Emmanuel Finkiel	France
2019	Yolande Zauberman	France
2021	Ezra Edelman	United States
2022	Agnieszka Holland	Poland
2023	Kirsten Johnson	United States
2024	Nicolas Philibert	France
2025	Julie Gayet	France
2026	Mstyslav Chernov	Ukraine

== Winners ==
=== 2010s ===
Year	English Title	Original Title	Director(s)	Country of Production	Ref.
2015	Beyond My Grandfather Allende	Allende, mi abuelo Allende	Marcia Tambutti Allende	Chile, Mexico	
2016	Cinema Novo		Eryk Rocha	Brazil	
2017	Faces Places	Visages Villages	Agnès Varda and JR	France	
2018	Samouni Road	La strada dei Samouni	Stefano Savona	Italy	
2019	For Sama	من أجل سما	Waad Al-Kateab and Edward Watts	Syria, United Kingdom	
2019	The Cordillera of Dreams	La Cordillère des songes	Patricio Guzmán	France, Chile	

=== 2020s ===
Year	English Title	Original Title	Director(s)	Country of Production	Ref.
2021	A Night of Knowing Nothing		Payal Kapadia	India	
2022	All That Breathes		Shaunak Sen	India	
2023	Four Daughters	بنات ألفة	Kaouther Ben Hania	Tunisia, France, Germany	
2023	The Mother of All Lies	كذب أبيض	Asmae El Moudir	Morocco, Egypt, Qatar, Saudi Arabia	
2024	Ernest Cole: Lost and Found		Raoul Peck	France, United States	
2024	The Brink of Dreams	رفعت عيني للسما	Nada Riyadh and Ayman El Amir	Egypt, France, Denmark, Qatar, Saudi Arabia	
2025	Imago		Déni Oumar Pitsaev	France, Belgium	
2026	Rehearsals for a Revolution	خاطرات ایران	Pegah Ahangarani	Iran, Czech Republic, Spain	

== Special Mention ==
In addition to the main winners of L'Œil d'or, some films have received a special mention:

Year	English Title	Original title	Director(s)	Country of Production	Ref.
2015	Ingrid Bergman: In Her Own Words	Jag är Ingrid	Stig Björkman	Sweden	
2016	The Cinema Travellers		Shirley Abraham and Amit Madheshiya	India	
2017	Makala		Emmanuel Gras	France	
2018	Libre		Michel Toesca	France	
2018	The Eyes of Orson Welles		Mark Cousins	United Kingdom	
2025	The Six Billion Dollar Man		Eugene Jarecki	United States, Germany, France	
2026	Tin Castle		Alexander Murphy	Ireland, France	
