= Arantxa Aguirre =

Spanish film director (born 1965)

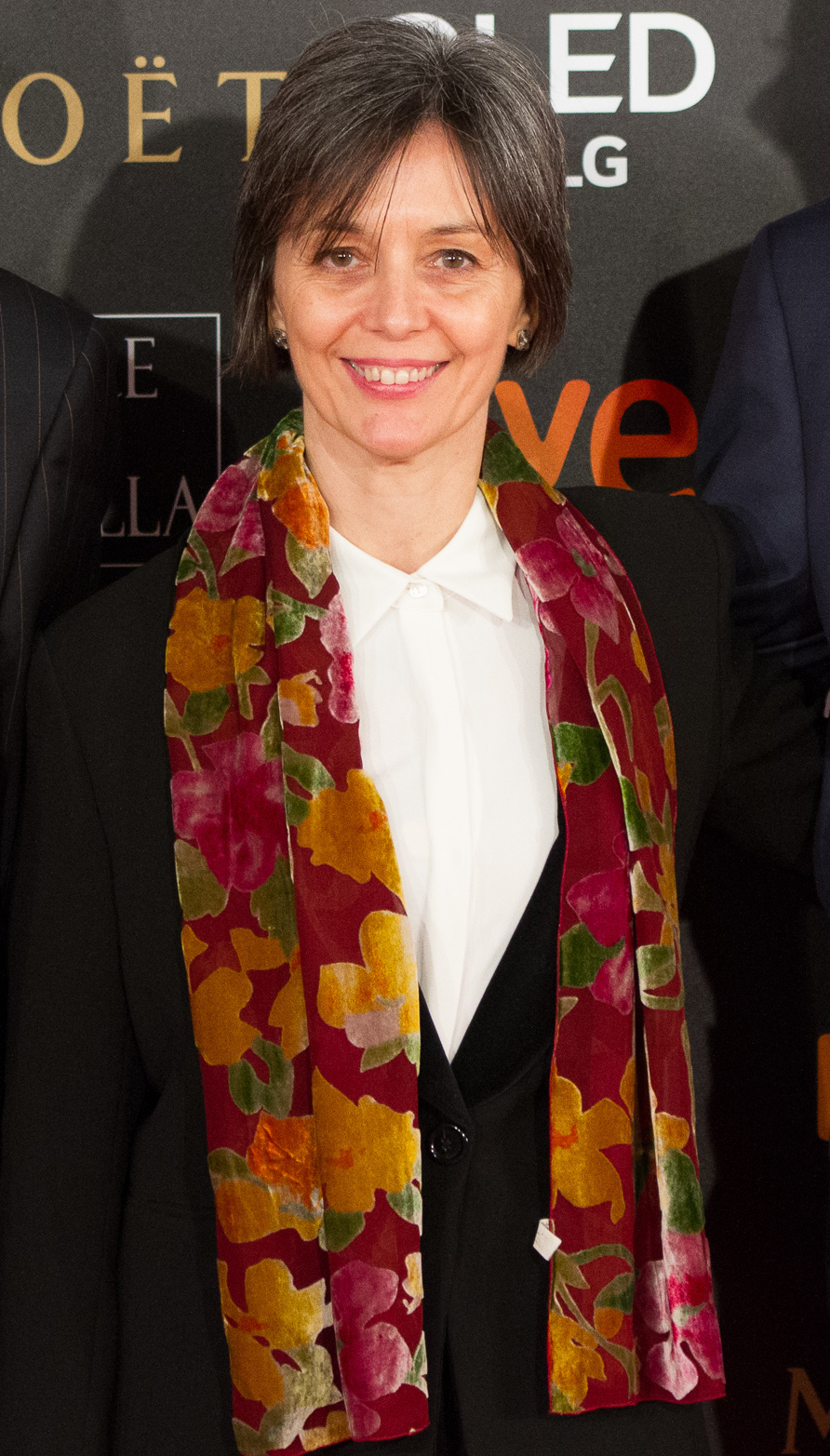
- Arantxa Aguirre during the 32nd Goya Awards
- Born: Arantxa Aguirre Carballeira; 1965 (age 60–61)
- Occupations: Film director and screenwriter
- Years active: 1990–present
- Parent(s): Javier Aguirre; Enriqueta Carballeira

Arantxa Aguirre Carballeira (born 1965) is a Spanish film director specialising in documentaries. She is also a scriptwriter. She is the daughter of noted Spanish film director Javier Aguirre and Spanish actress Enriqueta Carballeira.

Her best known film is perhaps Dancing Beethoven, which was nominated for the Goya Awards in 2017. It is about the creation of a ballet to the music of Beethoven's Ninth Symphony. The choreography is by Maurice Béjart. Aguirre had made an earlier film about Béjart's legacy called El esfuerzo y el ánimo ("Of Heart and Courage").

In 2018 she released El amor y el muerte ("Love and Death"). This film about the composer Enrique Granados takes its title from a piece in his piano suite Goyescas. It features noted performers of the music such as Rosa Torres-Pardo and Evgeny Kissin.

== Filmography ==
- 2020 Zurbarán and his Twelve Sons. Direction
- 2017 La zarza de Moisés. Direction and script. Els Joglars.
- 2016 Dancing Beethoven. Direction and script. LOPEZ-LI FILMS, S.L y FONDATION BÉJART BALLET LAUSANNE.
- 2015 Una rosa para Soler. Direction and script. LOPEZ-LI FILMS, S.L.
- 2012 Nuria Espert. Una mujer de teatro. Direction. ACCIÓN CULTURAL ESPAÑOLA.
- 2012 Juan y Teresa. Direction and script. LOPEZ-LI FILMS, S.L.
- 2011 An American swan in Paris. Direction and script. LOPEZ-LI FILMS, S.L. .
- 2009 El esfuerzo y el ánimo. Direction and script. LOPEZ-LI FILMS, S.L.
- 2006 Hécuba. Un sueño de pasión. Script. Co-direction with José Luis López-Linares. LOPEZ-LI FILMS, S.L.
- 2008 Un ballet para el siglo XXI. Script and direction. EMPRESA MUNICIPAL PROMOCIÓN MADRID, S.A.
- 2003. Un instante en la vida ajena (2003) Co-script with Javier Rioyo y Mauricio Villavechia. LOPEZ-LI FILMS, S.L.
