= Salvador Allende (film) =

- film poster
- Directed by: Patricio Guzmán
- Written by: Patricio Guzmán
- Produced by: Jacques Bidou
- Music by: Jorge Arriagada
- Release date: 2004
- Running time: 100 minutes
- Country: Chile
- Language: Spanish/French

Salvador Allende is a 2004 documentary film about Chilean president Salvador Allende, from his election campaign to the coup d'état which ended his life. It was directed by Patricio Guzmán and screened out of competition at the 2004 Cannes Film Festival.

== Synopsis ==
This film shows how Allende came to be elected in Chile and brought hope to much of the population by introducing socialist policies. It also explores the administration of Richard Nixon and its response (including the CIA's Project Fubelt) to Allende's election campaign and presidency.

== See also ==
- Cinema of Chile
