= Dancing Beethoven =

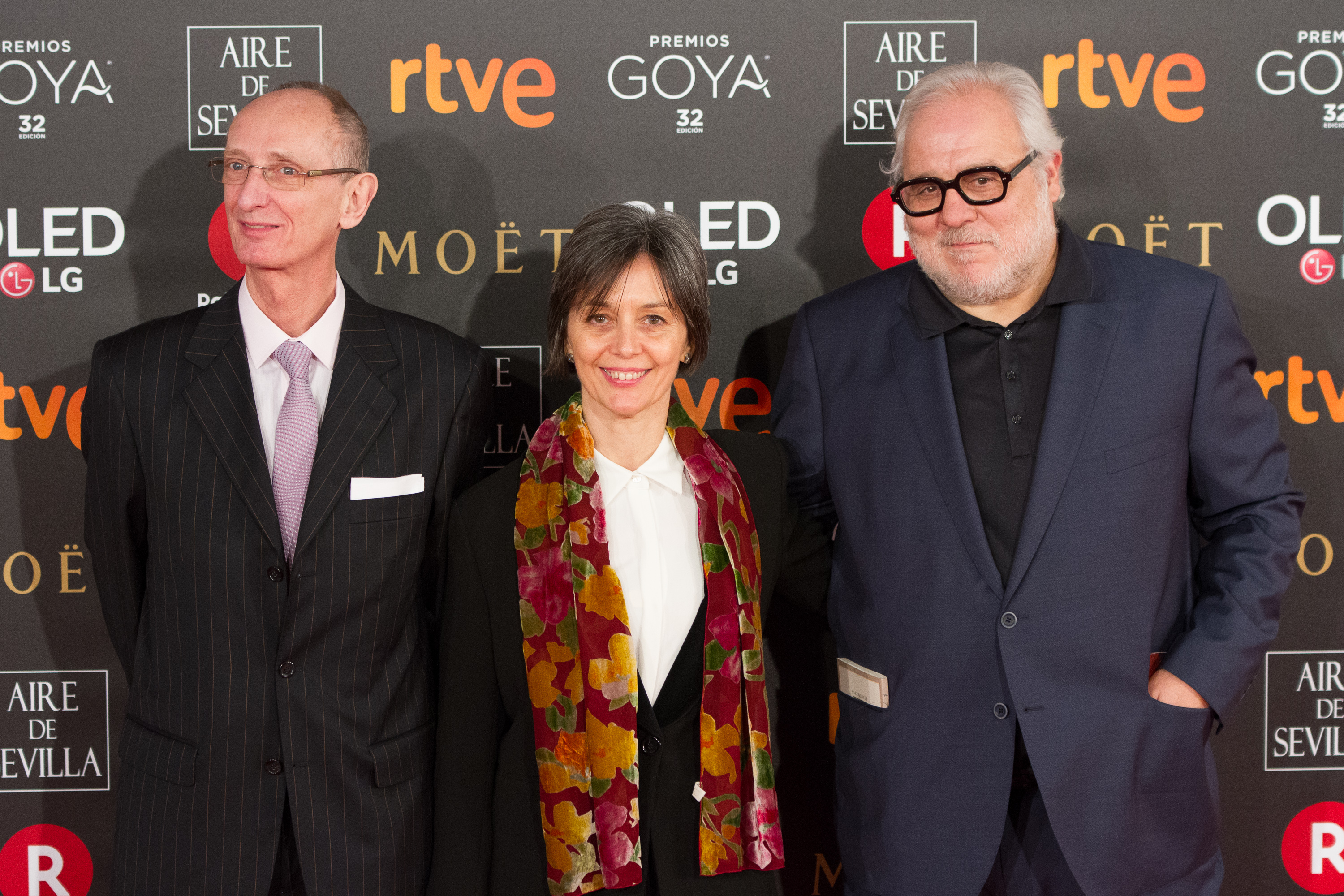
- Richard Perron, Arantxa Aguirre, and José Luis López Linares at the 32nd Goya Awards
- Directed by: Arantxa Aguirre
- Screenplay by: Arantxa Aguirre
- Starring: Zubin Mehta
- Cinematography: Rafael Reparaz
- Edited by: Valeria Gentile
- Music by: Ludwig van Beethoven
- Production companies: Coproducción España-Suiza; Fondation Béjart Ballet Lausanne; Fondation Maurice Béjart; López-Li Films
- Distributed by: Márgenes Distribución; Arsenal Filmverleih
- Release dates: 13 April 2017 (Germany); 28 April 2017 (Spain)
- Running time: 80 min
- Country: Spain

Dancing Beethoven is a 2017 documentary film by the Spanish director Arantxa Aguirre. It is about the work of the choreographer Maurice Béjart, founder of the Ballet of the 20th Century and other dance companies. It was released on 13 April 2017 in Germany and on 28 April 2017 in Spain. Shooting took place in Lausanne and Tokyo over nine months.

It tells the story of a revival of choreography created by Béjart in the 1960s for Beethoven's Ninth Symphony. The performance is given in Tokyo and the dancers are from the Béjart Ballet Lausanne and Tokyo Ballet, accompanied by the Israel Philharmonic Orchestra, conducted by Zubin Mehta.

== Cast ==
- Malya Roman
- Julien Favreau
- Elisabet Ros
- Kateryna Shalkina
- Óscar Chacón
- Gil Roman as a member of the Béjart Ballet Lausanne
- Kathleen Thielhem
- Masayoshi Onuki
- Alanna Archibald as a cello player
- Simon Hoffman as a cello player
- Zubin Mehta as the director

== Awards and nominations ==
Dancing Beethoven was nominated in the 32nd Goya Awards for Best Documentary Film and for the XXIII Premio Cinematográfico José María Forquéfor Best Documentary Feature although finally Muchos hijos, un mono y un castillo won.
