= 66th Locarno Film Festival =

Film festival in Locarno, Switzerland

- Opening film: 2 Guns directed by Baltasar Kormákur
- Closing film: On the Way to School directed by Pascal Plisson
- Location: Locarno, Switzerland
- Founded: 1946
- Awards: Golden Leopard: Story of My Death directed by Albert Serra
- Artistic director: Carlo Chatrian
- Festival date: Opening: 7 August 2013; Closing: 17 August 2013
- Website: LFF

Locarno Film Festival
- 67th 65th

The 66th Locarno Film Festival was held from 7 to 17 August 2013 in Locarno, Switzerland. There were 20 films in the main competition of which 18 were world premieres and two were international premieres. In the Filmmakers of the Present competition 14 out of the 16 films were from first time directors.

The opening film was the international premiere of 2 Guns directed by Baltasar Kormákur on the Piazza Grande, the 8,000-seat open-air theater The closing film was the 2013 documentary On the Way to School directed by Pascal Plisson.

There was a retrospective of the work of director George Cukor in collaboration with the Film Society of Lincoln Center. Cukor's film Rich and Famous starring Jacqueline Bisset was presented at the festival by Bisset herself. Hong Sang-soo had the world premiere of his film Our Sunhi, which won him Best Director in the main competition. Also featured was the third film, Exhibition, from emerging director Joanna Hogg. The winner in the Filmmakers of the Present competition was the innovative documentary Manakamana directed by Stephanie Spray and Pacho Velez, which contains only 11 shots, all in real-time, entirely inside a cable car.

This was journalist and film critic Carlo Chatrian's first year as artistic director of the festival following the departure of Olivier Père in 2012. The Leopard of Honor was awarded to Werner Herzog and his film Fitzcarraldo was screened in tribute.

The Golden Leopard, the festival's top prize, was awarded to Story of My Death directed by Albert Serra.

== Official Jury ==
=== Main Competition - (Concorso Internazionale) ===
- Lav Diaz, Jury president and Filipino film director
- Juan de Dios Larraín, film producer
- Valérie Donzelli, French actress
- Yorgos Lanthimos, Greek director
- Matthias Brunner, Swiss cinema critic and historian

== Official Sections ==
The following films were screened in these sections:

=== Piazza Grande ===
Piazza Grande: Prefestival

Original Title	English Title	Director(s)	Year	Production Country
Chinatown		Roman Polanski	1974	USA
Il Giardino Dei Finzi-Contini	The Garden of the Finzi-Continis	Vittorio De Sica	1970	Italia

Piazza Grande

English Title	Original Title	Director(s)	Year	Production Country
2 Guns		Baltasar Kormákur	2013	USA
About Time		Richard Curtis	2013	Great Britain
Blue Ruin		Jeremy Saulnier	2013	USA
Fitzcarraldo		Werner Herzog	1982	Repubblica Federale Tedesca
Gabrielle		Louise Archambault	2013	Canada
Gloria		Sebastián Lelio	2013	Chile
The Human Factor	La Variabile Umana	Bruno Oliviero	2013	Italia
Longwave	Les Grandes Ondes (À L’Ouest)	Lionel Baier	2013	Switzerland
The Blocher Experience	L’Expérience Blocher	Jean-Stéphane Bron	2013	Switzerland
Mr. Morgan's Last Love		Sandra Nettelbeck	2013	Germany
Rich and Famous		George Cukor	1981	USA
On the Way to School	Sur Le Chemin De L’École	Pascal Plisson	2013	France
The Keeper of Lost Causes	Kvinden i Buret	Mikkel Nørgaard	2013	Denmark
Vijay and I		Sam Garbarski	2013	Belgium
We're The Millers		Rawson Marshall Thurber	2013	USA
Wrong Cops		Quentin Dupieux	2013	France

=== Main Competition ===
Original Title	English Title	Director(s)	Production Country
The Backwater		Shinji Aoyama	Japan
Când Se Lasă Seara Peste Bucureşti Sau Metabolism	When Evening Falls on Bucharest or Metabolism	Corneliu Porumboiu	Romania
E Agora? Lembra-Me	What Now? Remind Me	Joaquim Pinto	Portugal
Educação Sentimental	Sentimental Education	Júlio Bressane	Brazil
El mudo	The Mute	Daniel Vega, Diego Vega	Peru
Exhibition		Joanna Hogg	Great Britain
Feuchtgebiete	Wetlands	David Wnendt	Germany
Gare Du Nord		Claire Simon	France
Historia De La Meva Mort	Story of My Death	Albert Serra	Spain
L’Étrange Couleur Des Larmes De Ton Corps	The Strange Colour of Your Body's Tears	Hélène Cattet and Bruno Forzani	Belgium
Mary Queen of Scots		Thomas Imbach	Switzerland
Pays Barbare	Barbaric Land	Yervant Gianikian, Angela Ricci Lucchi	France
Real		Kiyoshi Kurosawa	Japan
Sangue	Blood	Pippo Delbono	Italia
Short Term 12		Destin Daniel Cretton	USA
Shu Jia Zuo Ye	A Time in Quchi	Chang Tso-chi	Taiwan
Tableau Noir	Blackboard	Yves Yersin	Switzerland
Tonnerre		Guillaume Brac	France
Uri Seonhui	Our Sunhi	Sang Soo Hong	South Korea
Une Autre Vie	Another Life	Emmanuel Mouret	France

=== Filmmakers of the Present ===
The Concorso Cineasti del Presente, also known as the Filmmakers of the Present Competition, showcases first and second feature films from emerging filmmakers.

Filmmakers of the Present

Original Title	English Title	Director(s)	Year	Production Country
Buqälämun	Buqännun	Elvin Adigozel, Rufat Hasanov	2013	Azerbaijan
Costa Da Morte	Costa Da Death	Lois Patiño	2013	Spain
Forty Years From Yesterday		Robert Machoian, Rodrigo Ojeda-Beck	2013	USA
Le Sens De L’Humour	The Sense of Humor	Marilyne Canto	2013	France
Los Insólitos Peces Gato	The Unusual Cats	Claudia Sainte-Luce	2013	Mexico
L’Harmonie	Harmony	Blaise Harrison	2013	France
Manakamana		Stephanie Spray, Pacho Velez	2013	Nepal
Mouton		Gilles Deroo, Gilles Deroo, Marianne Pistone	2012	France
Roxanne		Valentin Hotea	2013	Romania
Sai Nam Tid Shoer	Sai Nam Time Shoer	Nontawat Numbenchapol	2013	Thailand
The Dirties		Matt Johnson	2013	USA
The Special Need		Carlo Zoratti	2013	Germany
The Stone		Se-rae Cho	2013	South Korea
The Ugly One		Éric Baudelaire	2013	France
The Unity Of All Things 物之合	The Unity of All Things	Alexander Carver, Daniel Schmidt	2013	USA
Yuan Fang		Zhengfan Yang	2013	China

=== Out of Competition ===
Out of Competition

Original Title	English Title	Director(s)	Year	Production Country
Bring The Sun Home		Chiara Andrich, Giovanni Pellegrini	2013	Italia
Géographie Humaine	Human Geography	Claire Simon	2013	France
Heritage		David Induni	2013	Switzerland
Indebito	Undue	Andrea Segre	2013	Italia
La Passione Di Erto	Erto's Passion	Penelope Bortoluzzi	2013	France
Que D’Amour	That of Love	Valérie Donzelli	2013	France
Se Eu Fosse Ladrão... Roubava	If I Were a Thief ... Stole	Paulo Rocha	2012	Portugal

Out of Competition: Death Row

Original Title	English Title	Director(s)	Year	Production Country
On Death Row - Portrait: Robert Fratta		Werner Herzog	2013	USA
On Death Row - Portrait: Darlie Routier		Werner Herzog	2013	USA
On Death Row - Portrait: Blaine Milam		Werner Herzog	2013	USA
On Death Row - Portrait: Douglas Feldman		Werner Herzog	2013	USA

Out of Competition: Focus on Syria

Original Title	English Title	Director(s)	Year	Production Country
Black Stone		Nidal Al-Dibs	2006	Syria
Hekayat An Elhob Walhayat Walmawt	Tales that Love, Life and Death	Nidal Hassan, Lilibeth Rasmussen	2012	Syria
Light Horizon		Randa Maddah	2012	Syria
Untold Stories		Hisham al-Zouki	2013	Syria
Zabad	Avad	Reem Ali	2008	Syria

Out of Competition: Jeonju Digital Project 2013 - Stranger

Original Title	English Title	Director(s)	Year	Production Country
Over There		ZHANG Lu	2013	South Korea
Someone’S Wife In The Boat Of Someone’S Husband		Edwin	2013	South Korea
Strangers When We Meet		Masahiro Kobayashi	2013	Japan

Out of Competition: Shorts

Original Title	English Title	Director(s)	Year	Production Country
America		Valerie Massadian	2013	France
Attesa Di UnʼEstate (Frammenti Di Vita Trascorsa)	Waiting for a Summer (Fragments of Past Life)	Mauro Santini	2013	Italia
During The Day My Vision Is Perfect		Benjamin Ramírez Pérez	2013	Germany
Le Tableau	The Table	Laurent Achard	2013	France
Lo Que El Fuego Me Trajo	What the Fire Brought Me	Adrián Villar Rojas	2013	Argentina
Los Andes	The Andes	Cristobal León & Joaquín Cociña	2012	Chile
Mahjong		João Rui Guerra da Mata, João Pedro Rodrigues	2013	Portugal
O Corpo De Afonso	Afonso's Body	João Pedro Rodrigues	2013	Portugal
Sorcière Japonaise	Japanese Witch	Romeo Grünfelder	2013	Germany
The End Of Walnut Grove		Ölfilmer	2013	Austria
The Green Serpent - Of Vodka, Men And Distilled Dreams		Benny Jaberg	2013	Switzerland
Un Conte De Michel De Montaigne	A Tale by Michel De Montaigne	Jean-Marie Straub	2012	France

Out of Competition: Signs of Life

Original Title	English Title	Director(s)	Year	Production Country
A Spell to Ward Off the Darkness		Ben Rivers, Ben Russell	2013	France
Cherry Pie		Lorenz Merz	2013	Switzerland
Dignity		James Fotopoulos	2012	USA
El Futuro	The Future	Luis López Carrasco	2013	Spain
How To Disappear Completely		Raya Martin	2013	Philippines

=== Open Doors ===
Open Doors: Artavazd Pelechian

Original Title	English Title	Director(s)	Year	Production Country
Kiank		Artavazd Pelechian	1993	Armenia
Menk		Artavazd Pelechian	1969	ex URSS
Mer Dare	More Dare	Artavazd Pelechian	1982	ex URSS
Skisb	Ski	Artavazd Pelechian	1967	ex URSS
Vertch		Artavazd Pelechian	1992	Armenia

Open Doors: Screenings

Original Title	English Title	Director(s)	Year	Production Country
13 Tzameti		Géla Babluani	2005	France
27 Dakarguli Kotsna	27 Missing Kisses	Nana Djordjadze	2000	Germany
Alaverdi		Maria Saakyan	2013	Armenia
Chemi Sabnis Naketsi		Zaza Rusadze	2013	Georgia
Embers		Tamara Stepanyan	2012	Armenia
Gaigimet	Keep Smiling	Rusudan Chkonia	2012	Georgia
Khchchvats Zugaherner		Hovhannes Galstyan	2009	Armenia
Mardkayin Patmutyun Paterazmi Yev Khaghaghutyan Orerits	Two Dies with Two Strokes in the Cheerfulness of Araretz	Vardan Hovhannisyan	2007	Armenia
Mayak	Beacon	Fariz Ahmedov	2012	Azerbaijan
Mi Nayir Hayelun		Suren Babayan	2010	Armenia
Netavi Ik Teatri Aris?!		Nana Janelidze	2011	Georgia
Return Of The Poet		Harutyun Khachatryan	2006	Armenia
Sahe	Pitch	Ilgar Safat	2010	Azerbaijan
Saroyanland		Lusin Dink	2013	Turkey
Tbilisi-Tbilisi		Levan Zaqareishvili	2005	Georgia
Yarasa	Bat	Ayaz Salayev	1995	Azerbaijan
Ösga Vaxt		Huseyn Mehdiyev	1996	Azerbaijan

=== Leopards of Tomorrow ===
Leopards of Tomorrow (Pardi di Domani)

==== Special Programs ====
Special Programs - Leopards of Tomorrow
Original title	English title	Director(s)	Year	Production country
Répondre À La Commande, Détourner, Remonter	Respond to the Order, Divert, Go Up	Jean Bacchetta, Richard Dindo, Yervant Gianikian, Raphaël Harari, Deborah Helle, Catherine Ofwono Anyango, Jean Perret, Sophie Perrier, Thomas Reichlin, Angela Ricci Lucchi, Julie Sando, Zahra Vargas, Julie Yara Zimmermann, Line de Kaenel	2013	Switzerland

==== International Competition ====
International Competition - Leopards of Tomorrow
Original Title	English Title	Director(s)	Year	Production Country
6 Stora Fiskar	6 Large Fish	Stefan Constantinescu	2013	Sweden
Acrobat		Eduardo Menz	2012	Canada
Chigger Ale		Fanta Ananas	2013	Ethiopia
Dead End		Tonia Mishiali	2013	Cyprus
D’Où Que Vienne La Douleur	Wherever the Pain Comes from	Khalil Cherti	2013	France
Endorphin		Reza Gamini	2013	Iran
Fun City		Justin Olstein	2012	Australia
Here Come The Girls		Young Jean Lee	2013	USA
La Quietud	The Stillness	Inés María Barrionuevo	2012	Argentina
La Strada Di Raffael	Raffael's Road	Alessandro Falco	2013	Italia
Les Jours D’Avant	The Days Before	Karim Moussaoui	2013	France
Los Pálidos	The Pale	Martin Kalina	2013	Argentina
Nasza Klątwa	Our Curse	Tomasz Sliwinski	2013	Poland
Plimbare	Walk	Mihaela Popescu	2012	Romania
Pride		Pavel Vesnakov	2013	Bulgaria
Quelqu’Un D’Extraordinaire	Someone Extraordinary	Monia Chokri	2013	Canada
Tadpoles		Ivan Tan	2013	Singapour
Tremor		Ricardo Alves jr.	2013	Brazil
Vehu Holech		Elad Keidan	2012	France
Versailles		Carlos Conceição	2013	Portugal
Von Hunden Und Tapeten	From Dogs and Wallpapers	Visar Morina	2013	Germany
Z1		Gabriel Gauchet	2013	Great Britain
Zima	Turn Off	Cristina Picchi	2013	Russia
Zinneke	Inz	Rémi Allier	2013	Belgium

==== National Competition ====
National Competition - Leopards of Tomorrow
Original title	English title	Director(s)	Year	Production country
Alfonso		Jan-Eric Mack	2013	Switzerland
Bonne Espérance	Good Hope	Kaspar Schiltknecht	2013	Switzerland
Freunde	Friends	Luca Ribler	2012	Switzerland
Hasta Santiago	To Santiago	Mauro Carraro	2013	Switzerland
La Fille Aux Feuilles	The Girl with Leaves	Marina Rosset	2013	Switzerland
Lui, Hitler Et Moi	Him, Hitler and Me	Nathan Hofstetter	2013	Switzerland
Skinny Boy		Lawrence Blankenbyl	2013	Switzerland
Sortie De Route	Output	Tristan Aymon, David Maye	2013	Switzerland
Vigia	Vigine	Marcel Barelli	2013	Switzerland
’A Iucata	'To Get	Michele Pennetta	2013	Switzerland

=== History (s) of Cinema ===
The festival's Histoire(s) du Cinéma section showcases films deemed significant to the evolution of cinema. Films by the festival's career award winners are presented in this section.

Histoire(s) du Cinéma
Original Title	English Title	Director(s)	Year	Production Country
A Masque Of Madness (Notes On Film 06-B, Monologue 02)		Norbert Pfaffenbichler	2013	Austria
Batang West Side		Lav Diaz	2001	Philippines
Bernadette Lafont, Exactement	Bernadette Lafont, Exactly	Estelle Frédet, André S. Labarthe	2007	France
Cinéastes De Notre Temps: Conversation Avec George Cukor	Filmmakers of Our Time: Conversation with George Cukor	Hubert Knapp, André S. Labarthe	1969	France
Journal D’Un Montage	Journal of a Montage	Annette Dutertre	2012	France
L’Ours	The Bear	Daniel Karolewicz	2013	Canada
Marilyn Monroe: The Final Days		Patty Ivins Specht	2001	USA
Otar Iosseliani, Le Merle Siffleur		Julie Bertuccelli	2006	France
Parole E Utopia #33 Otar Iosseliani	Words and Utopia #33 Otar Iosseliani	Donatello Fumarola, Alberto Momo	2013	Italia
Red Hollywood		Thom Andersen, Noël Burch	1996	USA
Rosso Cenere	Ash Red	Adriano Aprà, Augusto Contento	2013	France
The Wizard of Oz 3D Preview
The Wizard Of Oz 3D		Victor Fleming	1939	USA
Leopard Club Faye Dunaway
Network		Sidney Lumet	1976	USA
Tribute to: Paulo Rocha
Mudar De Vida	Change in Life	Paulo Rocha	1966	Portugal
Os Verdes Anos	The Green Years	Paulo Rocha	1963	Portugal
Tribute to: Anna Karina
Anna		Pierre Koralnik	1967	France
Bande à part		Jean-Luc Godard	1964	France
Lo Straniero	The Stranger	Luchino Visconti	1967	Italia
Career Leopard: Otar Iosseliani
Brigands, Chapitre VII	Brigands	Otar Iosseliani	1996	Georgia
Chantrapas		Otar Iosseliani	2010	France
Iko Shashvi Mgalobeli	Once Upon a Time There Was a Singing Blackbird	Otar Iosseliani	1970	ex URSS
Pastorali	Pastorale	Otar Iosseliani	1975	Georgia
Career Leopard: Sergio Castellitto
Alza La Testa	Raise Your Head	Alessandro Angelini	2009	Italia
La Bellezza Del Somaro	Love & Slaps	Sergio Castellitto	2010	Italia
L’Ora Di Religione	My Mother's Smile	Marco Bellocchio	2002	Italia
Va savoir	Who Knows?	Jacques Rivette	2001	France
Venuto Al Mondo	Twice Born	Sergio Castellitto	2012	Italia
Cinema Ticino Award
Le Quattro Volte	The Four Times	Michelangelo Frammartino	2010	Italia
L’Intervallo	The Interval	Leonardo Di Costanzo	2012	Italia
Swiss Cinema Rediscovered
Ludwig Hohl. Ein Film In Fragmenten	Ludwig Hohl. a Film in Fragments	Alexander J. Seiler	1982	Switzerland
Palaver, Palaver. Eine Schweizer Herbstchronik 1989	Palaver, Palaver. a Swiss Autumn Chronicle 1989	Alexander J. Seiler	1990	Switzerland

=== Retrospective - George Cukor ===
Retrospective George Cukor
Original Title	English Title	Director(s)	Year	Production Country
A Bill of Divorcement		George Cukor	1932	USA
A Double Life		George Cukor	1947	USA
A Life of Her Own		George Cukor	1950	USA
A Star Is Born		George Cukor	1954	USA
A Woman's Face		George Cukor	1941	USA
Adam's Rib		George Cukor	1949	USA
Bhowani Junction		George Cukor	1956	USA
Born Yesterday		George Cukor	1950	USA
Camille		George Cukor	1936	USA
David Copperfield		George Cukor	1935	USA
Dinner at Eight		George Cukor	1933	USA
Edward, My Son		George Cukor	1949	USA
Gaslight		George Cukor	1944	USA
Girls About Town		George Cukor	1931	USA
Grumpy		George Cukor, Cyril Gardner	1930	USA
Heller in Pink Tights		George Cukor	1960	USA
Her Cardboard Lover		George Cukor	1942	USA
Holiday		George Cukor	1938	USA
It Should Happen to You		George Cukor	1954	USA
Justine		George Cukor, Joseph Strick	1969	USA
Keeper of the Flame		George Cukor	1942	USA
Les Girls		George Cukor	1957	USA
Let's Make Love		George Cukor	1960	USA
Little Women		George Cukor	1933	USA
Love Among the Ruins		George Cukor	1975	Great Britain
My Fair Lady		George Cukor	1964	USA
Our Betters		George Cukor	1933	USA
Pat and Mike		George Cukor	1952	USA
Rockabye		George Cukor	1932	USA
Romeo and Juliet		George Cukor	1936	USA
Susan and God		George Cukor	1940	USA
Sylvia Scarlett		George Cukor	1935	USA
Tarnished Lady		George Cukor	1931	USA
The Actress		George Cukor	1953	USA
The Blue Bird		George Cukor	1976	USA
The Chapman Report		George Cukor	1962	USA
The Corn Is Green		George Cukor	1979	USA
The Marrying Kind		George Cukor	1952	USA
The Model and the Marriage Broker		George Cukor	1951	USA
The Philadelphia Story		George Cukor	1940	USA
The Royal Family of Broadway		George Cukor, Cyril Gardner	1930	USA
The Virtuous Sin		George Cukor, Louis J. Gasnier	1930	USA
The Women		George Cukor	1939	USA
Travels with My Aunt		George Cukor	1972	USA
Two-Faced Woman		George Cukor	1941	USA
What Price Hollywood?		George Cukor	1932	USA
Wild Is the Wind		George Cukor	1957	USA
Winged Victory		George Cukor	1944	USA
Zaza		George Cukor	1938	USA

=== The Films of the Juries ===
International Competition Jury
Original title	English title	Director(s)	Year	Production country
Alpis	Alps	Yorgos Lanthimos	2011	Greece
Norte, Hangganan Ng Kasaysayan	Northeast, History Border	Lav Diaz	2013	Philippines
Filmmakers of the Present Jury
B-52		Hartmut Bitomsky	2001	Germany
I Nostri Anni	Our Years	Daniele Gaglianone	2000	Italia
L’Orecchio Ferito Del Piccolo Comandante	The Wounded Ear of the Small Commander	Daniele Gaglianone	1993	Italia
Peaches Does Herself		Peaches	2012	Germany
Perpetuum Mobile	Permanently Mobile	Nicolás Pereda	2009	Mexico
Leopards of Tomorrow Jury
108 - Cuchillo De Palo	108 - Stick Knife	Renate Costa	2010	Spain
Até Ver A Luz	Until you See the Light	Basil Da Cunha	2013	Switzerland
Harmony Lessons		Emir Baigazin	2013	Kazakhstan
La Baie Du Renard	The Baie Du Renard	Grégoire Colin	2008	France
Lisières	Edges	Grégoire Colin	2012	France

=== Special Prizes ===
Douglas Trumbull (Vision Award)
Original Title	English Title	Director(s)	Year	Production Country
2001: A Space Odyssey		Stanley Kubrick	1968	USA
Close Encounters of the Third Kind		Steven Spielberg	1977	USA
Silent Running		Douglas Trumbull	1972	USA
Margaret Ménégoz
Conte D’Été	Summer Tale	Éric Rohmer	1996	France
Noce Blanche	White Wedding	Jean-Claude Brisseau	1989	France
Jacqueline Bisset
Under the Volcano		John Huston	1984	USA
Sir Christopher Lee
The Hound of the Baskervilles		Terence Fisher	1959	Great Britain
The Wicker Man		Robin Hardy	1973	Great Britain
Umbracle		Pere Portabella	1972	Spain
Victoria Abril
101 Reykjavík		Baltasar Kormákur	2000	Iceland
¡Átame!	Tie Me Up! Tie Me Down!	Pedro Almodóvar	1990	Spain
Werner Herzog
Aguirre, the Wrath of God		Werner Herzog	1972	Repubblica Federale Tedesca
Auch Zwerge Haben Klein Angefangen	Even Dwarfs Started Small	Werner Herzog	1970	Repubblica Federale Tedesca
Grizzly Man		Werner Herzog	2005	USA
Kaspar Hauser - Jeder Für Sich Und Gott Gegen Alle	The Enigma of Kaspar Hauser	Werner Herzog	1974	Repubblica Federale Tedesca
My Son My Son, What Have Ye Done?		Werner Herzog	2009	USA
Nosferatu: Phantom Der Nacht	Nosferatu the Vampyre	Werner Herzog	1978	Repubblica Federale Tedesca
The White Diamond		Werner Herzog	2004	Germany
The Wild Blue Yonder		Werner Herzog	2005	USA
Wo Die Grünen Ameisen Träumen	Where the Green Ants Dream	Werner Herzog	1984	Repubblica Federale Tedesca

== Independent Sections ==
=== Critics Week ===
The Semaine de la Critique is an independent section, created in 1990 by the Swiss Association of Film Journalists in partnership with the Locarno Film Festival.

Original Title	English Title	Director(s)	Year	Production Country
Big Men		Rachel Boynton	2013	USA
De Onplaatsbaren	The Unfinished	René A. Hazekamp	2012	Netherlands
Die Hüter Der Tundra	The Keepers of the Tundra	René Harder	2013	Germany
Earth’S Golden Playground		Andreas Horvath	2013	Austria
Master Of The Universe		Marc Bauder	2013	Germany
Watermarks – Three Letters From China		Luc Schaedler	2013	Switzerland
Õlimäe Õied	The Flowers of the Oil Hill	Heilika Pikkov	2013	Estonia

=== Appellation Swiss ===
Original Title	English Title	Director(s)	Year	Production Country
Annelie		Antej Farac	2012	Germany
Argerich		Stéphanie Argerich	2012	Switzerland
Der Imker	The Beekeeper	Mano Khalil	2013	Switzerland
Frühzug	Early Parade	Delia Hess	2012	Switzerland
Harry Dean Stanton: Partly Fiction		Sophie Huber	2012	Switzerland
Karma Shadub		Ramòn Giger	2013	Switzerland
La Clé De La Chambre À Lessive	The Key to the Laundry Room	Floriane Devigne, Frédéric Florey	2013	Switzerland
La Nuit De L’Ours	Bear Night	Samuel Guillaume, Frédéric Guillaume	2012	Switzerland
Man Kann Nicht Alles Auf Einmal Tun, Aber Man Kann Alles Auf Einmal Lassen	You Can't Do Everything at Once, but you can Leave Everything at Once	Marie-Elsa Sgualdo	2013	Switzerland
Sâdhu		Gaël Métroz	2012	Switzerland
Thorberg		Dieter Fahrer	2012	Switzerland
Tutto Parla Di Te	Everything Talks About you	Alina Marazzi	2012	Switzerland
Verliebte Feinde	Enemies in Love	Werner Schweizer	2012	Switzerland
Appellations Suisse: Jacqueline Veuve
Original title	English title	Director(s)	Year	Production country
La Petite Dame Du Capitole	The Little Lady of the Capitol	Jacqueline Veuve	2005	Switzerland

== Official Awards ==
=== International Competition (Concorso Internazionale) ===
- Golden Leopard (Pardo d’oro): Story of My Death directed by Albert Serra
- Special Jury Prize: 'E Agora? Lembra-Me directed by Joaquim Pinto
- Lepard for Best Director: Hong Sangsoo for the film U RI SUHNI
- Leopard for Best Actress: Brie Larson in Short Term 12 directed by Destin Cretton
- Leopard for Best Actor: Fernando Bacillo in El Mudo directed by Daniel and Diego Vega
- Special Mention (Concorso internazionale): Tableau Noir directed by Yves Yersin; Short Term 12 directed by Destin Daniel Cretton

=== Filmmakers of the Present Competition (Concorso Cineasti del presente) ===
- Pardo d’oro Cineasti del presente – Premio George Foundation: Manakamana directed by Pacho Velez and Stephanie Spray
- Premio per il miglior regista emergente (best emerging director): Lois Patiño for the film COSTA DA MORTE
- Premio speciale della giuria Ciné+ Cineasti del presente: Mouton directed by Gilles Deroo and Marianne Pistone

=== Opera Prima ===
- Special Mention (Opera Prima Jury): Manakamana directed by Pacho Velez and Stephanie Spray
- Pardo per la migliore opera prima (Best First Feature): Mouton directed by Gilles Deroo and Marianne Pistone

=== Leopards of Tomorrow - Pardi di domani ===
==== Leopards of Tomorrow - Concorso internazionale ====
- Pardino d’oro for the Best international Short Film: La Strada Di Raffael directed by Alessandro Falco
- Pardino d’argento (Concorso internazionale): Zima directed by Cristina Picchi
- Special Mention (Pardi di domani – Concorso internazionale): Endorphin directed by Reza Gamini
- Locarno short film nominee for the European Film Awards – Premio Pianifica: Zima directed by Cristina Picchi
- The Film und Video Untertitelung Prize: Tadpoles directed by Ivan Tan

==== Leopards of Tomorrow - Concorso nazionale ====
- Pardino d’oro for the Best Swiss Short Film: ‘A Iucata directed by Michele Pennetta
- Pardino d’argento (Concorso nazionale): Vigia directed by Marcel Barelli
- Action Light Prize for the Best Swiss Newcomer: La Fille Aux Feuilles directed by Marina Rosset

=== Piazza Grande ===
- Prix du Public UBS: Gabrielle directed by Louise Archambault
- Variety Piazza Grande Award: 2 Guns directed by Baltasaar Kormákur

=== Youth Jury ===
==== Youth Jury – Main Competition ====
- First Prize (Youth Jury – Concorso internazionale): Backwater directed by Shinji Aoyama
- Second Prize (Youth Jury – Concorso internazionale): Short Term 12 directed by Destin Daniel Cretton
- Third Prize (Youth Jury – Concorso internazionale): 'E Agora? Lembra-Me directed by Joaquim Pinto
- “Environment is quality of life” Prize: Tableau Noir directed by Yves Yersin
- Special mention (Youth Jury – Concorso internazionale): Educação Sentimental directed by Júlio Bressane

==== Youth Jury – Filmmakers of the Present ====
- Youth Jury Prize – Concorso Cineasti del presente: Los Insólitos Peces Gato directed by Claudia Sainte-Luce

==== Youth Jury – Leopards of Tomorrow ====
- Youth Jury special mention – Pardi di domani: Vigia directed by Marcel Barelli
- Youth Jury Prize – Pardi di domani (Concorso internazionale): Quelqu’Un D’Extraordinarie directed by Monia Chokri
- Youth Jury Prize – Pardi di domani (Concorso nazionale): Alfonso directed by Jan-Eric Mack

=== Europa Cinemas Label Jury ===
- Premio Europa Cinemas Label: Tableau Noir directed by Yves Yersin

=== SRG SSR idée suisse / Semaine de la critique Jury ===
- SRG SSR / Semaine de la critique Prize: Master Of The Universe directed by Marc Bauder
- Premio Zonta Club Locarno: ÕLimäe ÕIed directed by Heilika Pikkov

=== FICC/IFFS Jury ===
- Special Mention (FICC/IFFS Jury): Tonnerre directed by Guillaume Brac
- Don Quijote Prize: Sangue directed by Pippo Delbono

=== FIPRESCI Jury ===
- International Critics Prize (FIPRESCI Prize): 'E Agora? Lembra-Me (What now? Remind Me) directed by Joaquim Pinto

=== Ecumenical Jury ===
- Special Mention (Ecumenical Jury): Tableau Noir directed by Yves Yersin
