= Valladolid International Film Festival =

Annual film festival held in Valladolid, Spain

Coordinates: 41°39′14″N 4°43′28″W

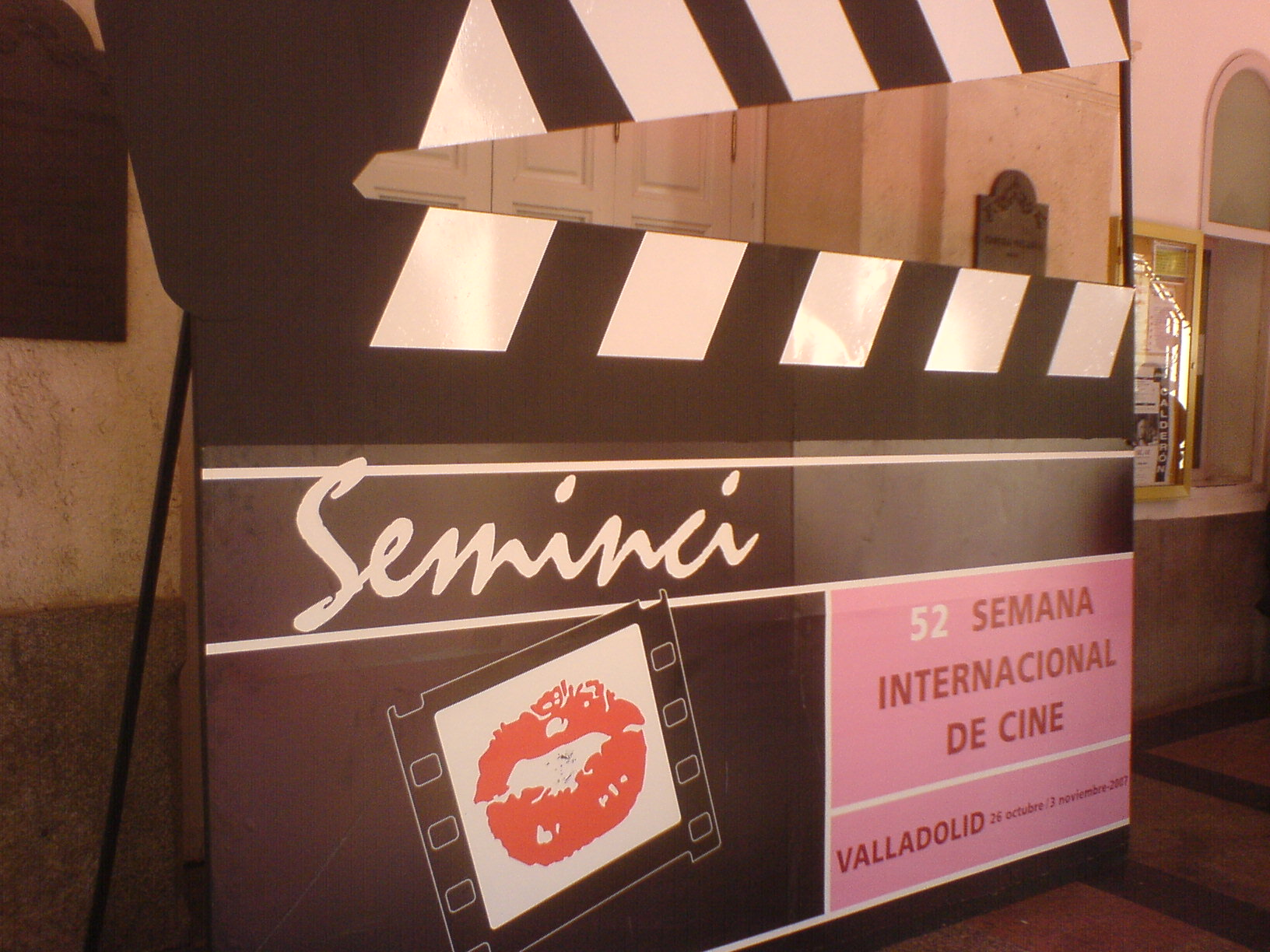
- SEMINCI 2007
- Location: Valladolid, Castile and León, Spain
- Founded: 20 March 1956; 70 years ago (as Valladolid Religious Film Week)
- Most recent: 24 October–1 November 2025
- Awards: Golden Spike
- Directors: Javier Angulo (2008–2022); José Luis Cienfuegos (2023–2025)
- Website: seminci.com

The Valladolid International Film Festival, popularly known as Seminci (Note: Spanish pronunciation: [seˈminθi], often mispronounced as Seminchi ([seˈmintʃi]).) (short for Semana Internacional de Cine de Valladolid; transl. 'Valladolid International Film Week'), is a film festival held annually in Valladolid, Spain. First held in 1956 as Semana de Cine Religioso de Valladolid ('Valladolid Religious Film Week'), the Seminci is one of the longest-standing film festivals in Spain. It stands out in the area of films d'auteur and independent films.

The Seminci conventionally takes place every October, about a month later than the San Sebastián Film Festival, the most prestigious film festival in Spain.

== History ==
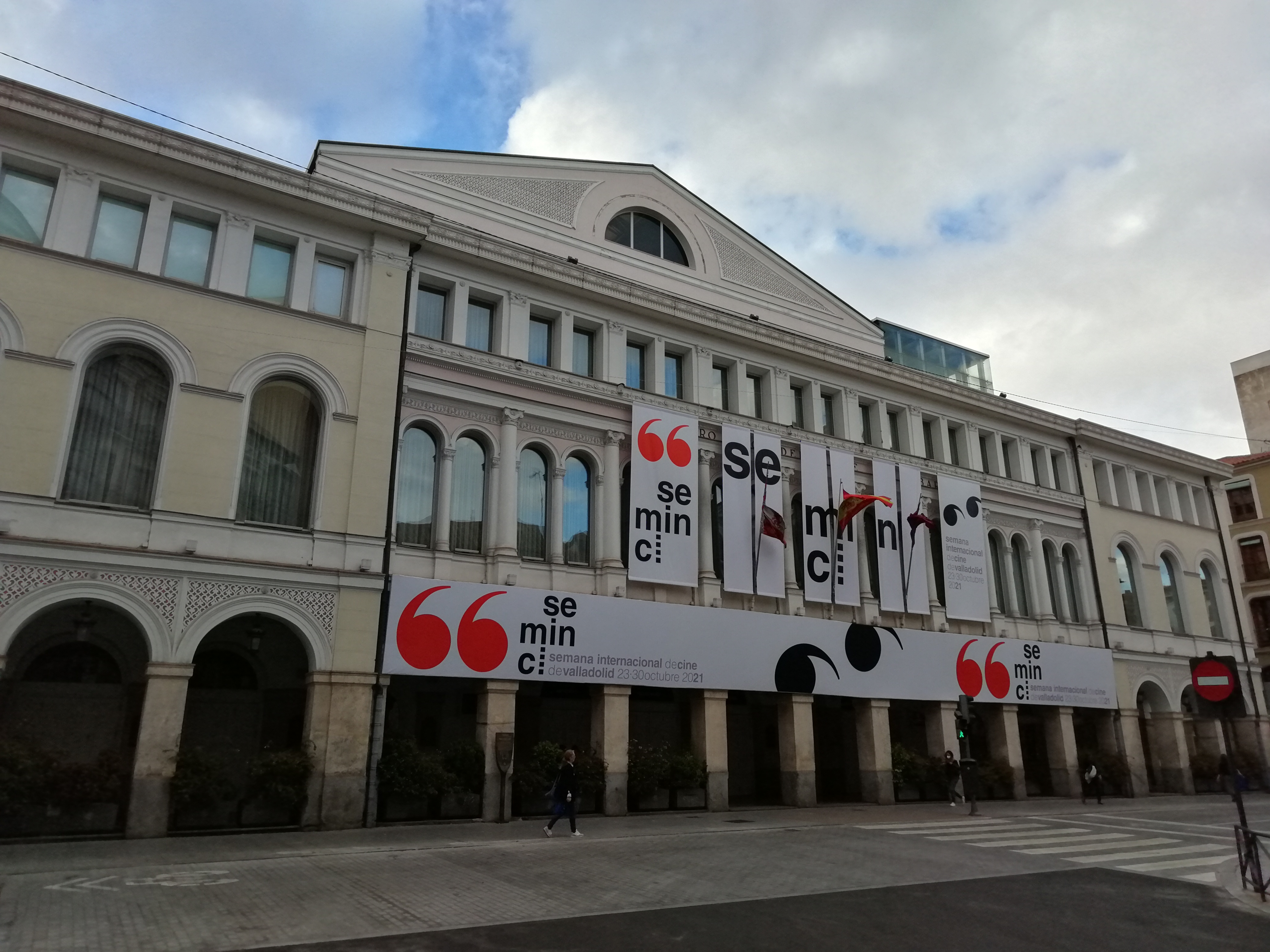
The façade of the Teatro Calderón, the festival's traditional venue, during the 66th edition.

The first edition of the festival began on 20 March 1956 under the name of Semana de Cine Religioso de Valladolid with the goal of promoting Catholic moral values in conjunction with the celebration of Holy Week in Valladolid. For the first two years it was not competitive and no prizes were awarded. In 1958 the Don Bosco gold and silver awards and the Special Mention appeared, which the following year were replaced by the Lábaro and the Ciudad de Valladolid Award, respectively.

The films to be shown were already selected according to quality and not quantity criteria, even if that meant having an insufficient number of films. Starting in 1960, the festival was renamed Semana Internacional de Cine Religioso y de Valores Humanos (the International Week of Religious Cinema and Human Values) and the theme of the films was expanded, accepting those in which human and committed values prevailed. That year the Golden Spike also began to be awarded, alongside the existing prizes and (since 1961) the San Gregorio Prize.

In 1973 the festival adopted its current name, due to the progressive increase in the films in competition and increased interest from producers. The end of the Franco dictatorship made it possible to leave behind the religious character. The following year the Lábaro disappeared and the Espiga became the main award. Subsequently, the awards for best actor and actress (1979), best screenplay (1984), best first film (1989), the Jury (1991) and the best new director (1992), among others, were introduced.

Since 2008, for 15 years, the festival was headed by Javier Angulo. In 2023, José Luis Cienfuegos was named as the new director of the Seminci. He was previously the director of the Gijón International Film Festival (1995–2011) and the Seville European Film Festival (2012–2022).

== Golden Spike ==

Films compete for the Golden Spike (Espiga de Oro), the top prize awarded at the festival. A list displaying some of the winners is as follows:

- 44th (1999): East Is East.
- 45th (2000): Requiem for a Dream & The Town Is Quiet.
- 46th (2001): Italian for Beginners.
- 47th (2002): Sweet Sixteen.
- 48th (2003): Osama & Crimson Gold.
- 49th (2004): 3-Iron.
- 50th (2005): In Bed.
- 51st (2006): The Optimists.
- 52nd (2007): 14 kilometers.
- 53rd (2008): Estômago: A Gastronomic Story.
- 54th (2009): Honeymoons.
- 55th (2010): Certified Copy & No Return.
- 56th (2011): Come as You Are.
- 57th (2012): Horses of God.
- 58th (2013): Tokyo Family.
- 59th (2014): The Farewell Party.
- 60th (2015): Rams.
- 61st (2016): Like Crazy.
- 62nd (2017): The Nile Hilton Incident.
- 63rd (2018): Genesis.
- 64th (2019): Öndög.
- 65th (2020): Preparations to Be Together for an Unknown Period of Time.
- 66th (2021): Last Film Show.
- 67th (2022): Return to Dust.
- 68th (2023): The Permanent Picture
- 69th (2024): Misericordia
- 70th (2025): Magellan & The Mastermind
- 71st (2026): Dao

== Recognition ==
In 2016, the Seminci was recognized with the Castilla y León Prize for the Arts, the highest institutional award from the region of Castile and León.
