= José Luis Cienfuegos =

Spanish festival programmer and cultural manager (1964–2025)

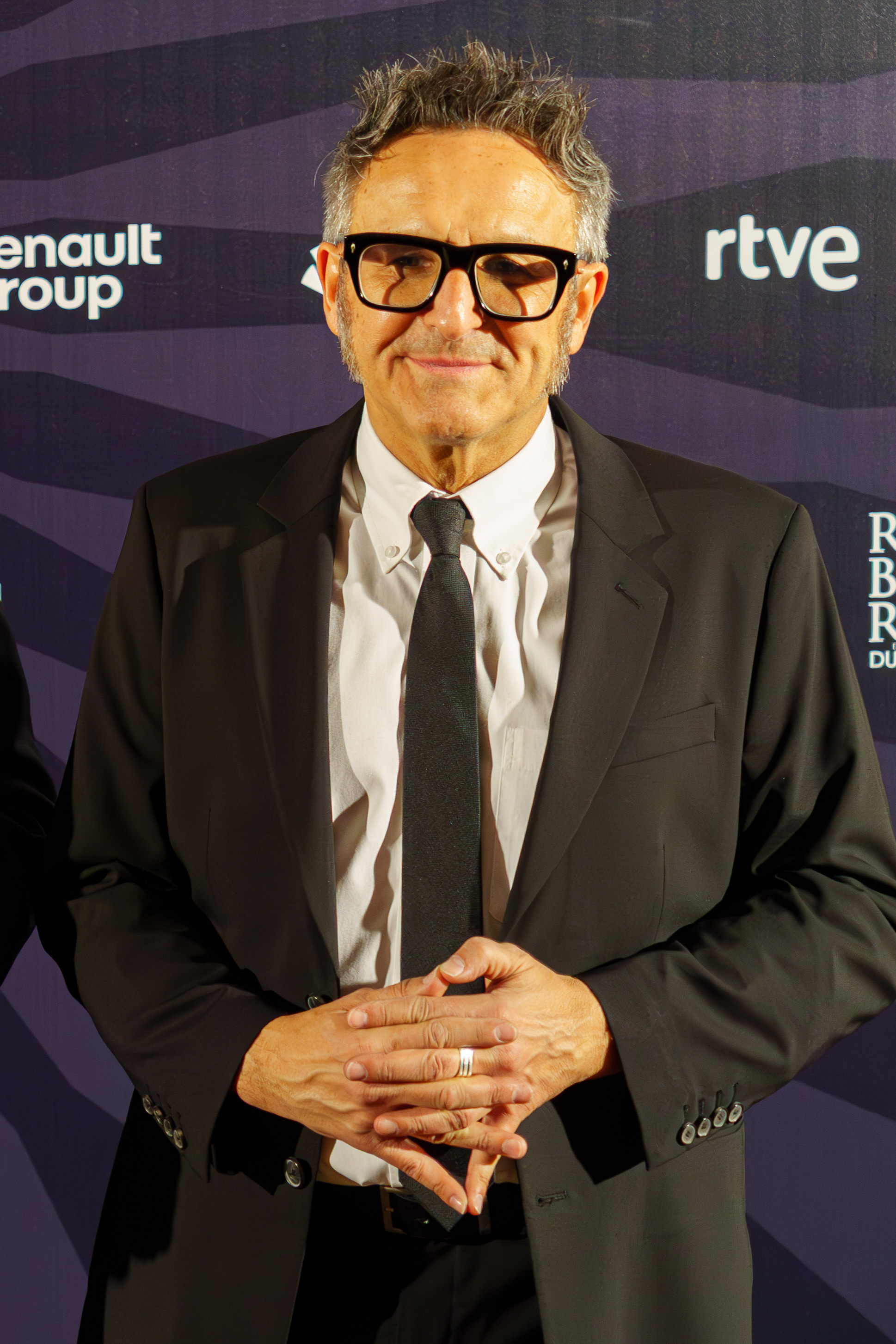
- Cienfuegos in 2025
- Born: José Luis Cienfuegos Marcello; 1964; Avilés, Spain
- Died: 2 December 2025 (aged 60–61); Madrid, Spain
- Occupations: Festival programmer, cultural manager

José Luis Cienfuegos Marcello (1964 – 2 December 2025) was a Spanish festival programmer and cultural manager. He served as director of the Gijón International Film Festival, the Seville European Film Festival, and the Valladolid International Film Festival.

== Life and career ==
José Luis Cienfuegos Marcello was born in Avilés in 1964. He studied psychology at the University of Oviedo.

He took over the direction of the Gijón International Film Festival in 1995. He was fired in January 2012 after the government of Asturias Forum got to municipal power in Gijón. At that point, the FICX had grown to become the 12th largest film festival in Europe by attendance. The decision to sack Cienfuegos was decried in a manifesto by over 400 filmmakers and members of the film industry. (Note: Including Lucía Puenzo, Pedro Almodóvar, Agustín Almodóvar, Jaume Balagueró, Elena Anaya, Todd Solondz, Enrique López Lavigne, Juan Carlos Fresnadillo, Lluís Homar, Kike Maíllo, Daniel Sánchez Arévalo, Claudia Llosa, Enrique Urbizu, Atom Egoyan, Lisandro Alonso, Montxo Armendáriz, Bertrand Bonello, Borja Cobeaga, Eduardo Chapero-Jackson, Víctor Erice, José Luis Guerín, Harmony Korine, Alberto Rodríguez, Santi Amodeo, Fernando Trueba, Isabel Coixet, David Trueba, Unax Ugalde, Ramón Salazar, Alberto San Juan, Carlos Reygadas, Alex de la Iglesia, Maribel Verdú, Roser Aguilar, Dunia Ayaso, Paulo Branco, Geraldine Chaplin, Mar Coll, Mychael Danna, Tom DiCillo, Abel Ferrara, Cesc Gay, Mateo Gil, Patricio Guzmán, Hal Hartley, Monte Hellman, Azazel Jacobs, Ken Jacobs, Bruce La Bruce, Pere Portabella, Felix Sabroso, Pablo Stoll, Koldo Serra, Rosa Vergés, Agustí Villaronga, Paco Cabezas, Cristina Huete, Oliver Laxe, Emilio Martínez Lázaro, Matthias Müller, Rubén Ochandiano, Puy Oria, Santiago Mitre, Javier Pereira, Isaki Lacuesta, Marc Recha, Jaime Rosales, Jonás Trueba, Nacho Vigalondo, and J. A. Bayona.) He then was appointed to the helm of the Seville European Film Festival (SEFF), serving from 2012 to 2022. He served as jury of the Prince of Asturias Prize and as member of the European Film Academy. From 2023 to 2025, he served as director of the Valladolid International Film Festival (Seminci).

On 2 December 2025, Cienfuegos died suddenly from a stroke in Madrid. He was posthumously bestowed the Gold Medal of Merit in the Fine Arts.
