= Pladevall =

Pladevall is a surname. Notable people with the surname include:

- Enric Pladevall (born 1951), Spanish sculptor
- Tomàs Pladevall (1946–2026), Spanish cinematographer
