= Nocturn 29 =

- Directed by: Pere Portabella
- Written by: Joan Brossa (dialogues, script); Pere Gimferrer (Catalan to Spanish translation); Pere Portabella (script)
- Produced by: Films 59 (Pere Portabella); Jacques Levy (associated producer); Anne M. Settimó (associated producer)
- Starring: Lucia Bosè
- Cinematography: Luis Cuadrado
- Edited by: Teresa Alcocer
- Music by: Josep M. Mestres Quadreny; Carles Santos (piano); Anna Ricci (voice)
- Production company: Films 59
- Distributed by: Interarte
- Release date: 1968
- Running time: 86 minutes
- Country: Spain
- Language: Spanish

Nocturn 29 (Spanish:Nocturno 29) is a 1968 avant-garde experimental Catalan film in Spanish directed by Pere Portabella i Ràfols and starring Lucia Bosè (Lucía) and Màrius Cabré (Mario). It is a prime example of the Barcelona School of Film (1960s-based experimental cinema).

== Description and commentary ==
This film is shot in black and white, primarily in a sort of burnt-out, high-contrast look, until near the end, when it turns color during the section that takes place in a draper's / fabric shop. In the color section, various flags appear from different countries, some of them under dictatorships... The flag of the Spanish Republic is also referenced through the placement of different rolls of fabric.

This film was subject to a great deal of censorship, as it was made in the middle of the fascist Franco Regime. The censors, however, didn't realize the meaning of the name, which Portabella explains as the 29 years of darkness that had transpired under Franco. They also let the (subtle?) reference to the Spanish Republic flag mentioned above get by.

== Cast ==
The following appear as members of the cast.

- Lucia Bosé as Lucía
- Màrius Cabré, a.k.a. Mario Cabré as Mario
- Ramon Julià
- Antoni Tàpies
- Antonio Saura
- Joan Ponç
- Luis Ciges
- Jordi Prats
- Willy van Rooy
- Núria Pàniker (Núria Pompeia)
- F. de Laguardia
- Ruggiero Selvaggio
- Manuel Jacas
- Guinyol Didó - This puppet company appears in the official film poster and some literature but does not seem to actually appear... [Puppet company originally run by Ezequiel «Didó» Vigués i Mauri (Terrassa 1880 - Bcn 1960) and Teresa "Teresina" Riera i Llisas (Terrassa, year? - Bcn 1975)]

== Production ==
The film was produced by Pere Portabella's production company, Films 59 (Barcelona) and distributed by Inter Arte Films, S.A.

Individuals involved in production were associated producers Jacques Levy and Anne M. Settimó, together with Pere Portabella. Head of production was Jaime Fernández Cid.

=== Crew ===
Portabella was the director, with José Luis Ruiz Marcos (?, ca. 1933 - Barcelona, 2018) as assistant director.

The script was by Portabella and the experimental poet Joan Brossa, who was responsible for the dialogues, which poet and translator Pere Gimferrer translating them from the Catalan into the Spanish (required during the Franco regime). Anne M. Settimó was responsible for the production script. Photography (cinematography) was by Luis Cuadrado, Lluís Maria Riera was the art director / responsible for decoration, and Teresa Alcocer did the editing, assisted by Margarita Bernet.

=== Music ===
The music was by experimental composer and musician Josep Maria Mestres Quadreny, with Carles Santos on the piano and soprano / mezzo-soprano Anna Ricci singing.

=== Poster ===
The official poster was made by painter Joan-Pere Viladecans (as his first poster, one of many to come).

=== Filming locations ===
The film was shot entirely in Catalonia, with outdoor shots in Barcelona, Portlligat, Les fonts de Sant Hilari Sacalm water springs, Baix Montseny (subcounty around Sant Celoni, near the Montseny Massif), Collformic mountain pass area (in the municipality of El Brull), Arbúcies, Coll de la Pollosa mountain pass (in Collsuspina) and Moià.

== Bibliography ==
- MOLINA FOIX, Vicente: "Reflexiones sobre un film que no persigue nuestra redención ('Nocturno 29', de Pedro Portabella)" (in Spanish), Nuestro Cine, No. 91, 1969, p. 22-33.
- Moliterno, Gino. The A to Z of Italian Cinema. Scarecrow Press, 2009.
