= Train of Shadows =

1997 film directed by José Luis Guerín

- Directed by: José Luis Guerín
- Written by: José Luis Guerín
- Produced by: Joan Antoni González; Pere Portabella
- Cinematography: Tomàs Pladevall
- Edited by: Manel Almiñana; José Luis Guerín
- Release date: 23 January 1998 (Spain)
- Running time: 88 minutes
- Country: Spain
- Language: Spanish

Train of Shadows (Spanish: Tren de sombras) is a 1997 Spanish experimental film directed by José Luis Guerín, who also wrote and co-edited it with Manel Almiñana. The film premiered at the Mar del Plata International Film Festival on 15 November 1997.

It received the Méliès d'Or for Best European Fantastic Film.
