= Warsaw Bridge =

- Directed by: Pere Portabella
- Written by: Pere Portabella, Carles Santos
- Cinematography: Tomàs Pladevall
- Music by: Carles Santos
- Release date: 1990
- Running time: 1h 25m
- Country: Spain
- Language: Spanish

Warsaw Bridge (Catalan: Pont de Varsòvia) is a 1990 feature film by Pere Portabella. It was written by Portabella and his frequent collaborator Carles Santos, who also wrote the score. It was Portabella's first film since 1977, and his first to be photographed entirely in color.
