= Tomàs Pladevall =

Catalan cinematographer (1946–2026)

Tomàs Pladevall Fontanet (25 November 1946 – 4 February 2026) was a Spanish cinematographer who worked on more than 50 films, some directed by José Luis Guerin, Bigas Luna, Francesc Bellmunt, and Pere Portabella.

== Life and career ==
Pladevall was born in Sabadell on 25 November 1946. He graduated in 1972 from the Official Film School of Madrid as a director of photography.

Pladevall died on 4 February 2026, at the age of 79.

== Filmography ==
- El Sopar (1974)
- La Maldicion de la Bestia (1975)
- Los hijos de Scaramouche (1975)
- La rossa del bar (1986)
- Bar-cel-ona (1987)
- Warsaw Bridge (1990)
- Actrius (1997)
- Tic Tac (1997)
- Train of Shadows (1997)
- The Pianist (1998)
- L'altra cara de la lluna (2000)
- Leo (2000)
- The Silence Before Bach (2007)
- El gènere femení (2011)
