= Eduard Grau =

Spanish cinematographer

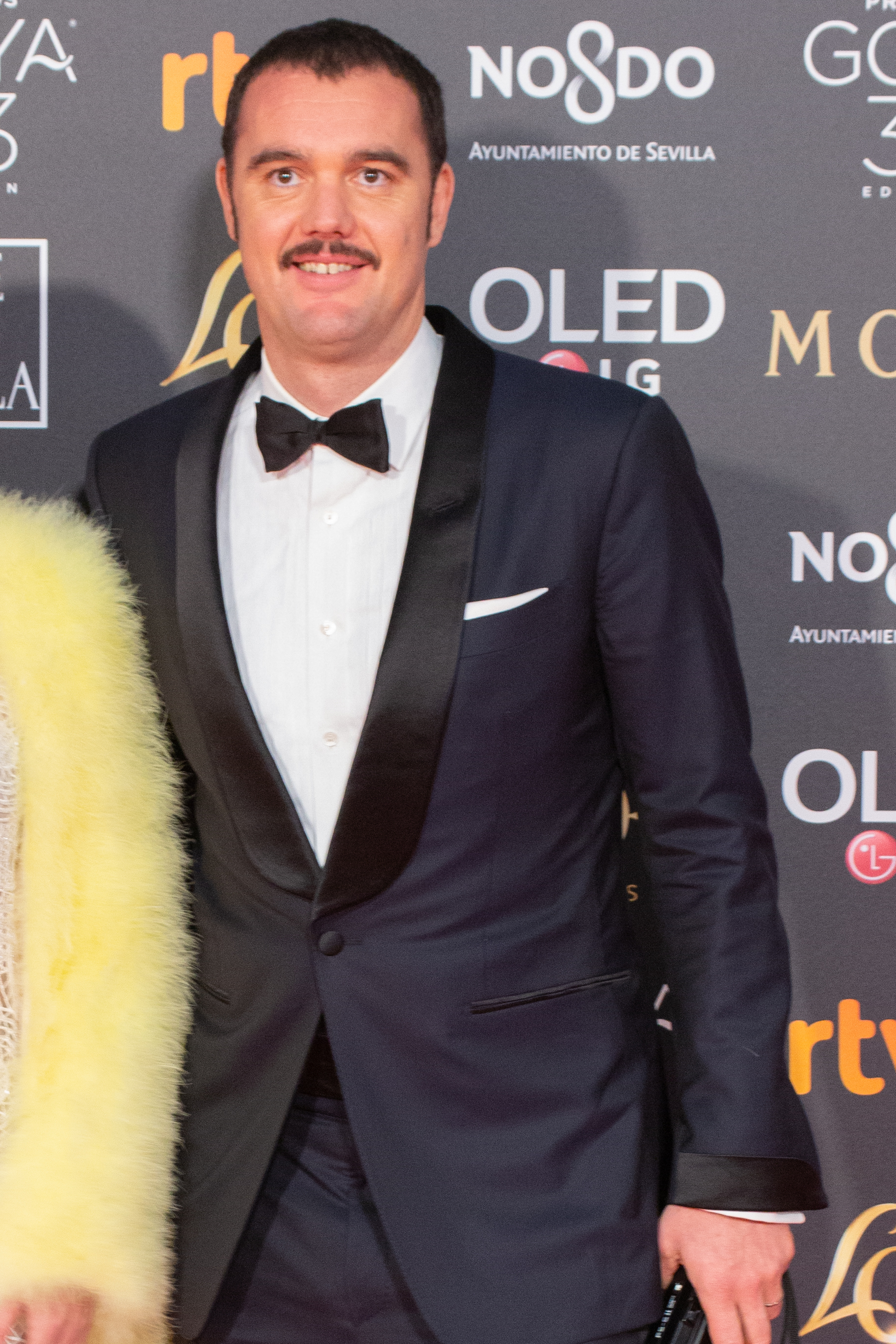
- Grau at the 2019 Goya Awards
- Born: 1981 (age 44–45); Barcelona, Catalonia, Spain
- Other name: Edu Grau
- Organization: American Society of Cinematographers

Eduard "Edu" Grau A.S.C. (born 1981) is a Spanish cinematographer.

He is a three-times Camerimage Golden Frog nominee, winning Bronze for Buried in 2010. The same year, he was named as one of Variety's "10 Cinematographers to watch".

Grau is a member of the Academy of Motion Picture Arts and Sciences since 2013. In January 2021, he became a member of the American Society of Cinematographers.

== Life and work ==
Grau was born in Barcelona.

He graduated from the Cinema and Audiovisual School of Catalonia (Barcelona, Spain) and the National Film and Television School (Beaconsfield, UK).

Grau shot his first feature, Honor of the Knights by Catalan auteur Albert Serra, at age 23. It was screened in the Director's Fortnight section at the 2006 Cannes Film Festival alongside works by David Cronenberg, Gus Van Sant and William Friedkin.

After shooting his follow-up film Kicks with director Lindy Heymann, Grau was hired to be the cinematographer for fashion designer Tom Ford's film A Single Man starring Colin Firth and Julianne Moore at age 27. i-D magazine included the film on its list of the "35 most stylish films of all time".

After Grau's fourth feature film, Finisterrae, was praised for its "splendid" and "painterly" imagery, he took on the challenging task to shoot Buried, starring Ryan Reynolds – a 95-minute film entirely set in a coffin underground.

While 2011's The Awakening was met with mixed reviews, critics noted that the film "looks great" and lauded "Eduard Grau’s elegant cinematography".

Grau lensed the music video for Lady Gaga's 2011 song Born This Way, directed by Nick Knight. The video won Gaga Best Female Video and Best Video with a Message at the 2011 MTV Video Music Awards. Grau also worked on campaigns for brands including Adidas, Apple, Gatorade, Nissan and Volkswagen.

== Filmography ==
=== Feature film ===
Year	Title	Director	Notes
2006	Honor of the Knights	Albert Serra	With Christophe Farnarier
2009	Kicks	Lindy Heymann	
2009	A Single Man	Tom Ford	
2010	Buried	Rodrigo Cortés	
2010	Finisterrae	Sergio Caballero	
2011	The Awakening	Nick Murphy	
2012	Arthur Newman	Dante Ariola	With Paula Huidobro
2012	Animals	Marçal Forés	
2013	A Single Shot	David M. Rosenthal	
2014	Suite Française	Saul Dibb	
2015	The Gift	Joel Edgerton	
2015	Suffragette	Sarah Gavron	
2016	Trespass Against Us	Adam Smith	
2018	Gringo	Nash Edgerton	
2018	Boy Erased	Joel Edgerton	
2018	Quién te cantará	Carlos Vermut	
2020	The Way Back	Gavin O'Connor	
2021	Passing	Rebecca Hall	
2024	Beverly Hills Cop: Axel F	Mark Molloy	
2024	The Room Next Door	Pedro Almodóvar	

=== Television ===
Year	Title	Director	Notes
2008	Kiss of Death	Paul Unwin	TV movie
2009	Coming Up	Jo McInnes; O. Nathapon	Episodes "Pornography" and "Raising Baby Rio"

=== Documentary works ===
==== Short film ====
Year	Title	Director
2007	Scarlet Sunrise	Himself; Edward Edwards
2008	Steel Homes	Eva Weber

==== Television ====
Year	Title	Director	Notes
2008	3MW: Rivers of Blood		Miniseries
2013	Cinéma, de notre temps	Gabe Klinger	Episode "Double Play: James Benning et Richard Linklater"
2015	Frontline	Angus MacQueen	Episode "Drug Lord: The Legend of Shorty"
2022	They Call Me Magic	Rick Famuyiwa	Miniseries

==== Film ====
Year	Title	Director	Note
2012	No Place on Earth	Janet Tobias	With César Charlone, Sean Kirby and Peter Simonite

== Awards and nominations ==
Alliance of Women Film Journalists

Year	Title	Category	Result
2022	Passing	Best Cinematography	Nominated

Black Reel Awards

Year	Title	Category	Result
2022	Passing	Outstanding Cinematography	Nominated

Camerimage

Year	Title	Category	Result
2004	Larutanatural	Golden Tadpole	Nominated
2009	A Single Man	Golden Frog	Nominated
2010	Buried	Golden Frog	Nominated
2010	Buried	Bronze Frog	Won
2015	Suffragette	Golden Frog	Nominated

Cinema Writers Circle Awards

Year	Title	Category	Result
2011	Buried	Best Cinematography	Nominated
2019	Quién te cantará	Best Cinematography	Won

Gaudí Awards

Year	Title	Category	Result
2011	Buried	Best Cinematography	Nominated
2019	Quién te cantará	Best Cinematography	Nominated

Goya Awards

Year	Title	Category	Result
2011	Buried	Best Cinematography	Nominated
2019	Quién te cantará	Best Cinematography	Nominated
2025	The Room Next Door	Best Cinematography	Won

Independent Spirit Awards

Year	Title	Category	Result
2022	Passing	Best Cinematography	Won

St. Louis Film Critics Association

Year	Title	Category	Result
2009	A Single Man	Best Cinematography	Nominated

Other awards

Year	Title	Award/Nomination
2005	Larutanatural	Best Student Cinematography (Palm Springs International ShortFest)
2005	Bitter Kas	Yelmo Cineplex Award (Barcelona Curt Ficcions)
2006	Bitter Kas	Best Foreign Short Film (Mar del Plata Film Festival)
2007	Scarlet Sunrise	Jury Award for Best Documentary (Munich International Festival of Film Schools)
2008	Friends Forever	Best Student Cinematography (Palm Springs International ShortFest)
2008	Friends Forever	Student Television Award for Postgraduate Drama (Royal Television Society)
2021	Passing	Nominated– Indiewire Critics' Poll for Best Cinematography
2022	Passing	Nominated– Chlotrudis Award for Best Cinematography; Nominated– CinEuphoria Award for Best Cinematography - International Competition; Nominated– International Online Cinema Award (INOCA) for Best Cinematography
2025	The Room Next Door	Platino Award for Best Cinematography
