= Josep Mestres Quadreny =

Catalan composer (1929–2021)

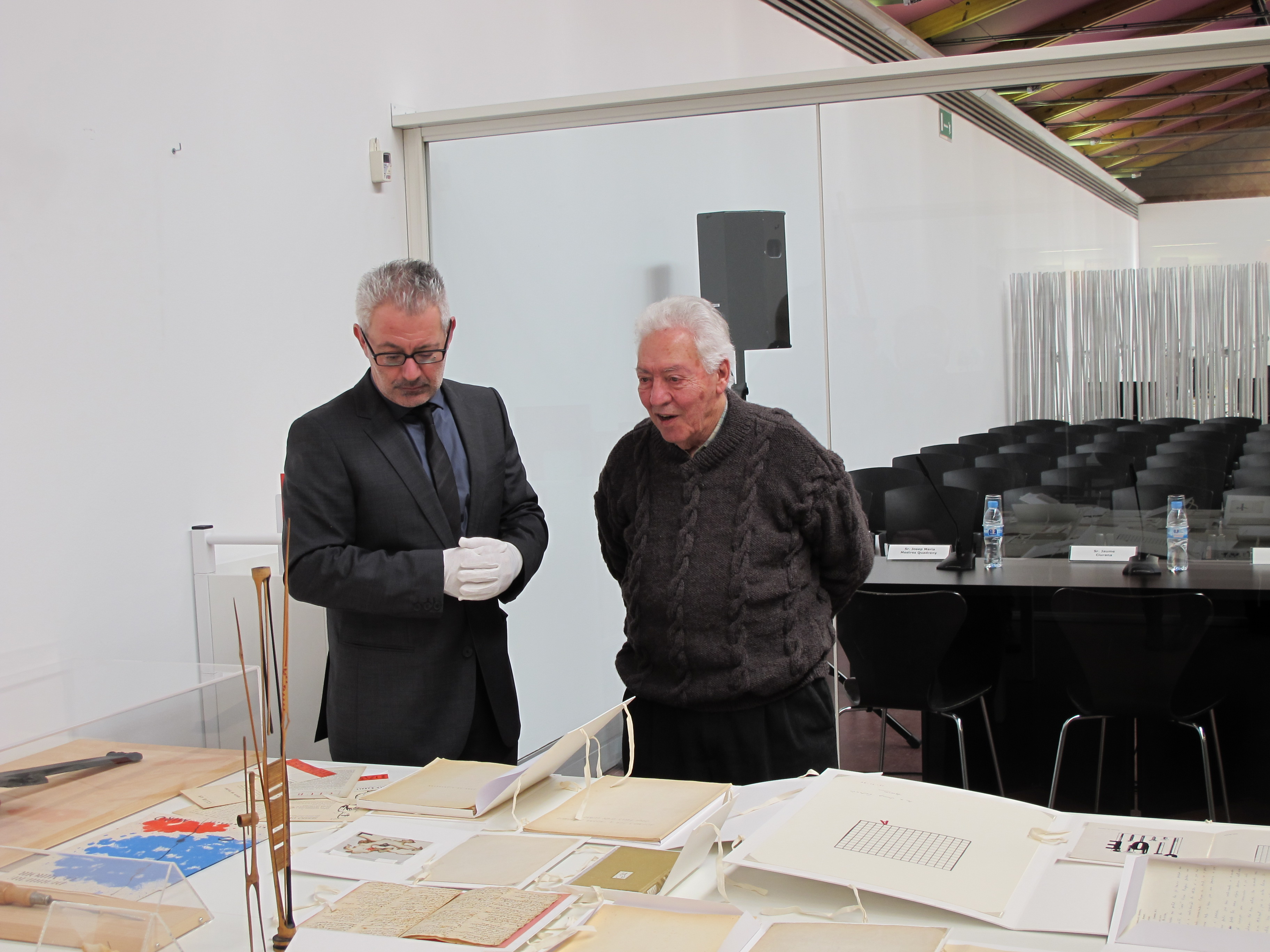
Josep Maria Mestre Quadreny with Bartomeu Marí at MACBA.

Josep Maria Mestres Quadreny (4 March 1929 – 18 January 2021) was a Spanish composer.

== Biography ==
He studied sciences at the University of Barcelona, taking lessons in composition from Cristòfor Taltabull. In 1968 he started the Catalan Group of Contemporary Music (Conjunt Català de Música Contemporània), and in 1976 the Catalan Instrumental Group (Grup Instrumental Català) with Carles Santos. He was also one of the founders of the Phonos Laboratory of Electroacoustic Music in 1973.

His output included incidental music for theatre and cinema, musicals, ballet, opera and instrumental music. He also collaborated with visual artists, including Joan Miró, Antoni Tàpies and Joan Brossa.

In addition to his compositional activities, he taught at the Darmstadt New Music Courses and the Latin American Course of Contemporary Music (Cursos Latinoamericanos de Música Contemporánea) in Brazil.

He was chairman of the Joan Brossa Foundation and an emeritus member of the board of trustees of the Joan Miró Foundation.

== Selected filmography ==
- Nocturne 29 (1968)
