= Out of This World (2026 film) =

- Directed by: Albert Serra
- Written by: Albert Serra
- Produced by: Albert Serra
- Starring: Riley Keough; F. Murray Abraham; Liza Yankovskaia; Birte von Knoblauch
- Cinematography: Artur Tort
- Production companies: Les Films du Losange; Idéale Audience Group; Andergraun Films; Felix Culpa; Rosa Filmes; Forma Pro
- Release date: 2026
- Countries: France; Spain; Portugal; Latvia; United States
- Language: English

Out of This World is an upcoming drama film written and directed by Albert Serra. It stars Riley Keough, F. Murray Abraham, Alexander Johnson, Liza Yankovskaia and Birte von Knoblauch. It is Serra's first English-language film.

== Premise ==
An American delegation travels to Russia in the midst of the Ukrainian war to try to find a solution to an economic dispute linked to sanctions.

== Cast ==
- Riley Keough
- F. Murray Abraham
- Alexander Johnson
- Liza Yankovskaia
- Birte von Knoblauch

== Production ==
In May 2024, it was announced that Albert Serra would be writing and directing his English-language feature film debut, with Kristen Stewart in the lead role. In March 2025, Serra told Catalan radio station RAC1 that Stewart exited the project due to being unsatisfied with script changes.

Principal photography began in May 2025, in Latvia, with Riley Keough, F. Murray Abraham, Alexander Johnson, Liza Yankovskaia, and Birte von Knoblauch joining the cast. In September 2025, it was reported that filming had "recently wrapped in Latvia". Serra had filmed over 800 hours of footage to edit in post-production over the course of a four-week shoot.

== Release ==
Out of This World is scheduled to be released in the United States in 2026.
