= Innisfree (film) =

1990 film

- Directed by: José Luis Guerín
- Written by: José Luis Guerín
- Produced by: Paco Poch
- Cinematography: Gerardo Gormezano
- Edited by: José Luis Guerín
- Release date: 1990
- Running time: 110 minutes
- Country: Spain
- Languages: English; Irish

Innisfree is a 1990 Spanish documentary film directed by José Luis Guerín. It was screened in the Un Certain Regard section at the 1990 Cannes Film Festival. The film revisits Cong, a small town in the west of Ireland, famous as the location of the 1952 John Ford film The Quiet Man.

== Cast ==
- Bartley O'Feeney as himself
- Padraig O'Feeney as himself
- Anna Livia Ryan as herself
- Anne Slattery as Maureen O'Hara
