= Birdsong (film) =

- Directed by: Albert Serra
- Written by: Albert Serra
- Produced by: Montse Triola; Lluis Miñarro
- Starring: Victòria Aragonés; Lluís Carbó; Mark Peranson; Lluís Serrat Batlle; Lluís Serrat
- Edited by: Àngel Martín; Albert Serra
- Music by: Pau Casals
- Release date: 2008
- Running time: 98 minutes
- Country: Spain
- Languages: Catalan; Hebrew

Birdsong (Catalan: El cant dels ocells) is a 2008 film by Catalan auteur Albert Serra. The film recounts the journey of the three wise men as they travel to meet the Baby Jesus. Serra shot and edited over 100 hours of footage for the film. Canadian film critic Mark Peranson played Joseph.

== Reception ==
A. O. Scott, writing for The New York Times, called Birdsong "less a retelling of the Nativity story than a dream about it, filtered... through a sensibility that recalls Luis Buñuel and Samuel Beckett".

Birdsong won several prizes at the 2009 Gaudí Awards.
