= Story of My Death =

- French theatrical release poster
- Catalan: Història de la meva mort
- Directed by: Albert Serra
- Written by: Albert Serra
- Based on: My Life by Casanova
- Starring: Vicenç Altaió; Eliseu Huertas; Lluís Serrat; Noelia Rodenas
- Cinematography: Jimmy Gimferrer
- Release date: 2013
- Running time: 148 minutes
- Countries: Spain; France; Romania
- Language: Catalan
- Budget: €1.3 million

Story of My Death (Catalan: Història de la meva mort) is a 2013 slow cinema drama film directed by Albert Serra. It won the Golden Leopard at the 66th Locarno Film Festival. The film is about an aging Casanova and his encounter with Count Dracula. The title resembles that of Casanova's autobiography, Histoire de ma vie ("Story of my Life").

== Plot ==
As a mature libertine Marquis, Casanova, famous for his spectacular sexual conquests, arrives accompanied by his servant, in a peasant village within a thick forests. There within a strange and erotic atmosphere, Casanova encounters the mysterious Count Dracula.

== Production ==
The film was shot in seven weeks, in Romania and France, including at the Château de Bourgon in Montourtier (Mayenne), the Château d'Ansouis in Ansouis (Vaucluse) and the Château de Beauregard in Mons (Var).

== Reception ==
The film won the Golden Leopard at the 66th Locarno Film Festival.

On review aggregator website Rotten Tomatoes, the film has an approval rating of 75% based on 12 reviews, and an average rating of 8.8/10. On Metacritic, the film has a weighted average score of 80 out of 100, based on 6 critics, indicating "generally favorable reviews".
