= The Silence Before Bach =

2007 Spanish drama film

- Directed by: Pere Portabella
- Screenplay by: Xavier Albertí; Pere Portabella; Carles Santos
- Starring: Àlex Brendemühl
- Cinematography: Tomàs Pladevall
- Edited by: Òskar Xabier Gómez
- Music by: Johann Sebastian Bach
- Release date: 2007
- Country: Spain

The Silence Before Bach, originally titled Die Stille vor Bach, is a 2007 Spanish musical drama film co-written and directed by Pere Portabella about the life and works of Johann Sebastian Bach.

The film premiered in the Orizzonti section of the 64th edition of the Venice Film Festival.

== Cast ==
- Àlex Brendemühl as the truck driver
- Christian Brembeck as J. S. Bach
- Féodor Atkine as the piano seller
- George-Christoph Biller as the cantor of St. Thomas
- Georgina Cardona as the cellist
- Lucien Dekoster as the piano tuner
- Beatriz Ferrer-Salat as the Amazon
- Fanny Silvestre as Anna Magdalena Bach
- Daniel Ligorio as Felix Mendelssohn
- Lina Lambert as Mendelssohn's mother

== Reception ==
On Rotten Tomatoes, the film has an 84% approval rating based on 19 reviews.
