= Umbracle =

- Directed by: Pere Portabella
- Written by: Joan Brossa Pere Portabella
- Produced by: Films 59
- Starring: Christopher Lee Jeanine Mestre
- Cinematography: Manuel Esteban
- Music by: Carles Santos
- Release date: 1972
- Running time: 84 minutes
- Country: Spain
- Languages: Catalan and Spanish

Umbracle is an experimental feature film by Catalan filmmaker Pere Portabella. It is often seen as a companion piece to his Cuadecuc, vampir, also starring Christopher Lee. Both films were completed in 1970, though Umbracle was not shown until 1972.

Like Cuadeuc, the entire film is photographed on different kinds of high contrast black & white film stock and features a sound track by frequent Portabella collaborator Carles Santos. Unlike Cuadecuc, Umbracle features several scenes of synchronized sound, including a notable scene where Christopher Lee recites Edgar Allan Poe's "The Raven" and sings opera in an empty theatre, and a lengthy sequence of Spanish filmmakers discussing censorship in their country very frankly, their statements later reinforced by a nearly 15-minute segment from a pro-Franco film. Any sound effects used in the film usually have no relation to the scenes themselves, for example the sound of a telephone ringing can be heard in a scene where Lee witnesses a kidnapping, or people shouting solfa at different intensities whilst Lee walks the street.

From the official web site: "As in Vampir-Cuadecuc, this film turns on two basic axes: the inquiry into ways of cinematographic representation and a critical image of official Spain at the time of the Francoist State. "Montage ofattractions" and Brechtianism in strong doses. Umbracle is made up of fragments (some are archive footage) that resound rather than progress by unusual links, with dejá vu scenes that promise us more but remaintensely unfinished. Jonathan Rosembaun said: "few directors since Resnais have played so ruthlessly with the unconscious narrative expectations to bug us". Learning from the feeling of strangeness caused by Rossellini as he threw well known actors into savage scenery in southern Europe.""
