= Honor of the Knights =

- Directed by: Albert Serra
- Written by: Albert Serra
- Cinematography: Eduard Grau
- Release date: 2006
- Running time: 103 or 110 minutes
- Language: Catalan

Honor of the Knights (Catalan: Honor de cavalleria; also known as Honor of the Knights/Quixotic) is a 2006 slow film by Catalan auteur Albert Serra. The film re-envisions the adventures from the Miguel de Cervantes novel Don Quixote, eschewing the Cervantes narrative in favour of placing Quixote and Sancho Panza on a contemplative, wandering story. Serra explained that he chose the subject-matter of the film so he could "focus on atmosphere... on things I love better than just showing the plot... With these characters... I don’t care about being more or less faithful to the original source or character that comes from literature or history".

The film was screened at the Directors' Fortnight section of the 2006 Cannes Film Festival.

== Reception ==
Matt Zoller Seitz, writing for The New York Times, called the film "a virtual definition of the phrase 'acquired taste'", but added that "if you invest yourself in Mr. Serra’s vision, the film’s emotional payoffs are devastating". Honor of the Knights appeared in a tie for seventh place on Cahiers du Cinéma's top ten list of 2007.
