= The Academy of Muses =

- Spanish: La academia de las musas
- Directed by: José Luis Guerín
- Written by: José Luis Guerín
- Starring: Raffaele Pinto; Emanuela Forgetta; Rosa Delor Muns; Mireia Iniesta; Patricia Gil; Carolina Llacher
- Cinematography: José Luis Guerín
- Edited by: José Luis Guerín
- Production companies: Guerín PC; Los Films de Orfeo
- Release dates: August 2015 (Locarno); 1 January 2016 (Spain)
- Country: Spain
- Languages: Catalan; Italian; Spanish; Sardinian

The Academy of Muses (Spanish: La academia de las musas) is a 2015 Spanish film directed, written, edited, and lensed by José Luis Guerín blending documentary and comedy elements.

== Plot ==
The plot follows an ethically dubious Italian professor of literature at the University of Barcelona and the interactions with his female students.

== Cast ==
- Raffaele Pinto
- Emanuela Forgetta
- Rosa Delor Muns
- Mireia Iniesta
- Patricia Gil
- Carolina Llacher

== Production ==
The film is a Guerín PC and Los Films de Orfeo production. It was shot with a non-professional cast of actors, featuring dialogue in Catalan, Italian, Spanish, and Sard.

== Release ==
The film made its world premiere in August 2015 at the 68th Locarno Film Festival. It also screened at the Seville European Film Festival in November 2015. It was theatrically released in Spain on 1 January 2006.

== Reception ==
Eric Kohn of IndieWire gave the film an 'A' grade, deeming it to be "a fascinating look at the antics of an ethically dubious professor that defies easy categorization".

Pere Vall of Fotogramas rated the film 4 out of 5 stars, praising "the (sheer) amount of things it tells us in its apparent simplicity".

Javier Ocaña of El País considered it to be a "fascinating cinematographic experiment".

Gaspar Zimerman of Clarín rated it as "good" while warning that "patience is required for the film".

== Accolades ==
Year	Award	Category	Nominee(s)	Result	Ref.
2015	12th Seville European Film Festival	Golden Giraldillo		Won	
2016	2nd Fénix Awards	Best Screenplay	José Luis Guerín	Nominated	
2016	2nd Fénix Awards	Best Editing	José Luis Guerín	Nominated	
2018	66th Silver Condor Awards	Best Ibero-American Film		Nominated	

== See also ==
- List of Spanish films of 2016
