= El Sopar =

- Directed by: Pere Portabella
- Written by: Pere Portabella
- Starring: Ángel Abad; Jordi Cunill; Lola Ferreira; Antonio Marín; Narciso Julián
- Cinematography: Manel Esteban; Tomàs Pladevall
- Release date: 1974
- Running time: 50 minutes
- Languages: Spanish; Catalan

El Sopar (English: Dinner) is a 1974 documentary film, in Catalan and Spanish, by experimental filmmaker Pere Portabella. The film takes place on the night of the execution of militant anarchist Salvador Puig Antich by Franco's Spanish State. Using simple cinematic conventions, Portabella's documentary involves five former political prisoners gathered in a farmhouse to prepare dinner and discuss the problems with long prison terms.

To protect the film's subjects from persecution by in Francoist Spain, the film's production was coordinated in secrecy, with notices of the secret shooting location sent to technicians and participants at staggered times. After Franco’s death, Portabella recut his film and added an interview with Puig Antich’s lawyer. In 2018, he added a new intertitle that refers to the Catalan pro-independence politicians currently in jail.

== Sources ==
- Clandesti: Forbidden Catalan Cinema Under Franco at Pragda
- Forbidden Catalan Cinema at Film Society of Lincoln Center
