= In the City of Sylvia =

- Directed by: José Luis Guerín
- Written by: José Luis Guerín
- Produced by: Luis Miñarro; Gaëlle Jones
- Starring: Pilar López de Ayala; Xavier Lafitte
- Cinematography: Natasha Braier
- Edited by: Núria Esquerra
- Production companies: Eddie Saeta S.A. Chateau Rouge Production
- Distributed by: Wanda Vision; Eddie Saeta S.A.
- Release dates: 5 September 2007 (Venice Film Festival); 14 September 2007 (Spain)
- Running time: 84 minutes
- Country: Spain
- Languages: French; Spanish

In the City of Sylvia (Spanish: En la Ciudad de Sylvia) is a 2007 film directed by José Luis Guerín. The film follows a young man credited only as 'Él' (English:'Him') as he wanders central Strasbourg in search of Sylvia, a woman he asked for directions in a bar six years earlier.

== Release ==
The film had its premiere at the Venice Film Festival on 5 September 2007. The director also created a silent documentary companion piece called Some Photos in the City of Sylvia, which he assembled from still photographs he had taken, released that same year. The photographs were taken in 2004 and served as the basis for the screenplay for In the City of Sylvia.

== Critical reception ==
The film appeared on some critics' top ten lists of the best films of 2008. V.A. Musetto of the New York Post named it the best film of 2008, J. Hoberman of The Village Voice named it the 8th best film of 2008., and Sam C. Mac of In Review Online named it the 2nd best film of 2008. Ignatiy Vishnevetsky of The A.V. Club described it as "something of a masterpiece."

== Awards and nominations ==
En la Ciudad de Sylvia was nominated for the 2007 Golden Lion at the Venice Film Festival, although the award was eventually presented to Ang Lee for Lust, Caution. En la Ciudad de Sylvia won the 2008 Australian Film Critics Association award for the 'best unreleased film' in Australia at the time of the awards. Guerín won the best director award of the Premios ACE 2009 for this film.
