= Cuadecuc, vampir =

- Film poster
- Directed by: Pere Portabella
- Written by: Joan Brossa; Pere Portabella
- Produced by: Pere Portabella
- Starring: Christopher Lee; Herbert Lom; Soledad Miranda; Jack Taylor
- Cinematography: Manel Esteban
- Edited by: Miguel Bonastre
- Music by: Carles Santos
- Production company: Films 59
- Distributed by: Ronin Films
- Release date: May 1971 (Directors Fortnight)
- Running time: 69 minutes
- Country: Spain
- Language: English

Cuadecuc, vampir is a 1970 Spanish experimental film written, produced, and directed by Pere Portabella. It stars Christopher Lee, Herbert Lom, Soledad Miranda, and Jack Taylor. The film tells an abbreviated version of the Dracula story using behind-the-scenes footage from the Jesús Franco film Count Dracula.

== Plot ==
The film tells the story of Dracula using behind-the-scenes footage from the making of the film Count Dracula, complete with scenes of the cast and crew working on the film in between takes. The film also shows how the special effects and sets of the film were designed, often splicing these moments with footage of the actors. With the exception of the final scene, which features Christopher Lee explaining the end of the novel, the film is mostly silent, with sparse music and sound effects sparingly used.

== Cast ==
- Christopher Lee as himself/Dracula
- Herbert Lom as himself/Prof. Van Helsing
- Soledad Miranda as herself/Lucy Westenra
- Jack Taylor as himself/Quincey Morris

== Reception ==
J. Hoberman of The New York Times praised the film, calling it "ghostly" and "among the most highly regarded avant-garde films of the past half century". James Evans of Starburst Magazine gave it seven out of ten stars, commending the cinematography, and soundtrack.
