= Seville European Film Festival =

Film festival

- Location: Seville, Spain
- Founded: 2004
- Most recent: 22nd Seville European Film Festival
- Directors: Manuel Cristóbal
- Website: Official Website

The Seville European Film Festival (SEFF; Spanish: Festival de Cine Europeo de Sevilla) is an annual film festival dedicated to European cinema held in November in Seville, Spain, since 2004.

== History ==
The festival is an initiative of the Instituto de la Cultura y las Artes de Sevilla (transl. Institute of Culture and Arts of Seville; ICAS), which depends on the City Council of Seville. It is supported by the ICAA and the sub-programme Europe Creative MEDIA. Since 2013, it collaborates with Filmin.

The SEFF's program includes competition sections for feature films, documentaries, shorts and non-fiction along with special events such as retrospectives, screenings and public talks. The event includes the Independent Film Market. The festival also serves as a staging ground for the announcement of the nominations to the European Film Academy's European Film Awards. The event main venues are Teatro Lope de Vega and Teatro Alameda Multicines Nervión Plaza.

In 2012, the festival art director Javier Martin Dominguez resigned, he was succeeded by José Luis Cienfuegos. Cienfuegos managed the SEFF until April 2023. His place was given to Tito Rodriguez, but the latter took medical leave, thus just a few days before the opening of the anniversary 20th edition Manuel Cristóbal became the SEFF's new director.

In 2023, the festival introduced Sevilla Cinema Lab, an initiative offering high-level training for cinema professionals.

== Editions ==
The first edition took place on 6–13 November 2004.

The second edition took place in November 2005 under director Antonio Grosso. The main competition program jury was presided by Michael Ballhaus.

The 7th edition took place on 5-13 November, 2010. It included Eurimages Euro co-production section and the Arte Channel Collection.

In 2012, the festival's budget was cut by 30% resulting in the resignation of Javier Martin Dominguez. Taking his place, the new director José Luis Cienfuegos introduced the Greece Focus section.

In 2016, the 13th edition lasted from 4 to 12 November and hosted 27 world premieres. That year the festival inaugurated the Spanish Screenings-Sevilla TV market. Film-opening: Stéphane Brizé's film A Woman's Life.

The 17th edition of the festival was a hybrid one and went partially online.

The 18th edition took place on 5-13 November, 2021, and featured 10 world premieres. It also hosted the 40th anniversary of the Paris-based experimental film institution Light Cone.

The 20th edition took place on 4-12 November, 2022, and featured 222 screenings, 99 Spanish premieres, 38 world premieres and two international premieres. The program also included more than 120 public talks with cinema professionals. Film-opening: Rebecca Zlotowski’s Other People’s Children.

In August 2023, the new municipal administration decided to postpone the 20th edition, due to be held in early November 2023, to the Spring of 2024, in order to make room for the celebration of the 24th Annual Latin Grammy Awards. Such plans were rolled back days later, with the festival returning to a November 2023 date, but later in the month and featuring a shorter format.

The 2024 edition ran from 8-16 November. Its top film went to And Their Children After Them, with prizes for best animation feature film going to Flow and for best director going to Magnus von Horn for The Girl with the Needle.

== Awards ==
The top prize awarded at the festival is known as the 'Golden Giraldillo' (Giraldillo de Oro).

- Avanim (2004)
- The Beat That My Heart Skipped (2005)
- Venus (2006)
- It's a Free World... (2007)
- Back Soon (2008)
- Lourdes (2009)
- Son of Babylon (2010)
- Happy, Happy (2011)
- Eat Sleep Die (2012)
- Stranger by the Lake (2013)
- Force Majeure (2014)
- The Academy of Muses (2015)
- Slack Bay (2016)
- The Nothing Factory (2017)
- Donbass (2018)
- Martin Eden (2019)
- Malmkrog (2020)
- Great Freedom (2021)
- Saint Omer (2022)
- And Their Children After Them (2024)
- We Believe You (2025)
- You Don't Belong Here (2026)
