= What Now? Remind Me =

2013 film

- Film poster
- Directed by: Joaquim Pinto
- Written by: Joaquim Pinto
- Starring: Joaquim Pinto
- Release dates: 8 August 2013 (Locarno); 28 August 2014 (Portugal)
- Running time: 164 minutes
- Country: Portugal
- Language: Portuguese

What Now? Remind Me (Portuguese: E Agora? Lembra-me) is a 2013 Portuguese documentary film directed by Joaquim Pinto. It was selected as the Portuguese entry for the Best Foreign Language Film at the 87th Academy Awards, but was not nominated.

The film is a first-person documentary about Pinto's life with HIV, documenting both his family life with his husband Nuno Leonel and his experiences in clinical trials for various experimental antiretroviral drugs.

== Cast ==
- Joaquim Pinto as himself
- Nuno Leonel as himself

== See also ==
- List of submissions to the 87th Academy Awards for Best Foreign Language Film
- List of Portuguese submissions for the Academy Award for Best Foreign Language Film
