= Joaquim Pinto =

Portuguese film director

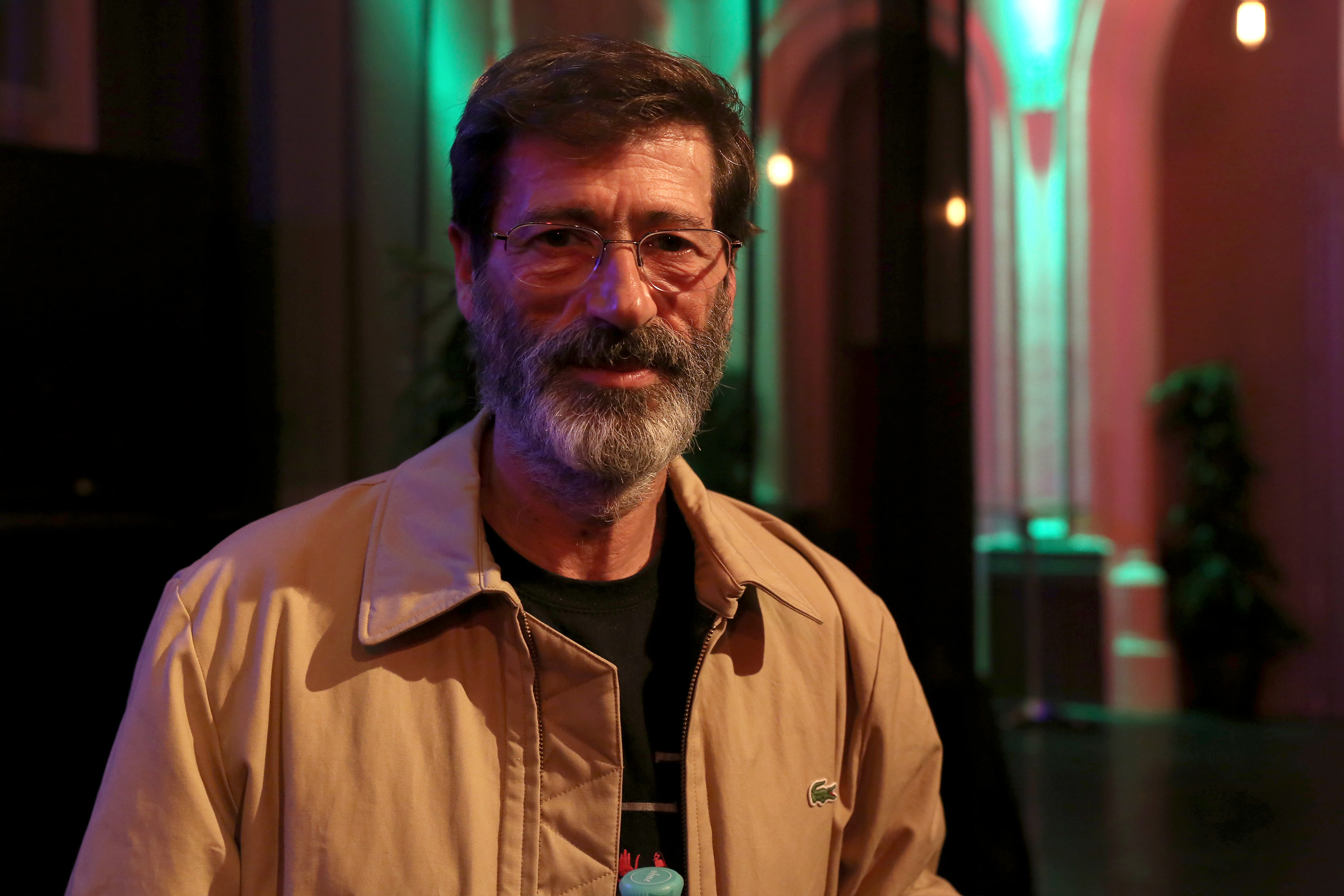
- Joaquim Pinto at Festival Internacional de Cinema in Vienna (2013)
- Born: June 20, 1957; Porto, Portugal
- Occupation: Film director
- Notable work: What Now? Remind Me

Joaquim Pinto (born 20 June 1957) is a Portuguese film director from Porto. His movie What Now? Remind Me was the Portuguese submission for the Academy Award for Best Foreign Language Film in 2014.
