= Albert Serra =

Spanish filmmaker (born 1975)

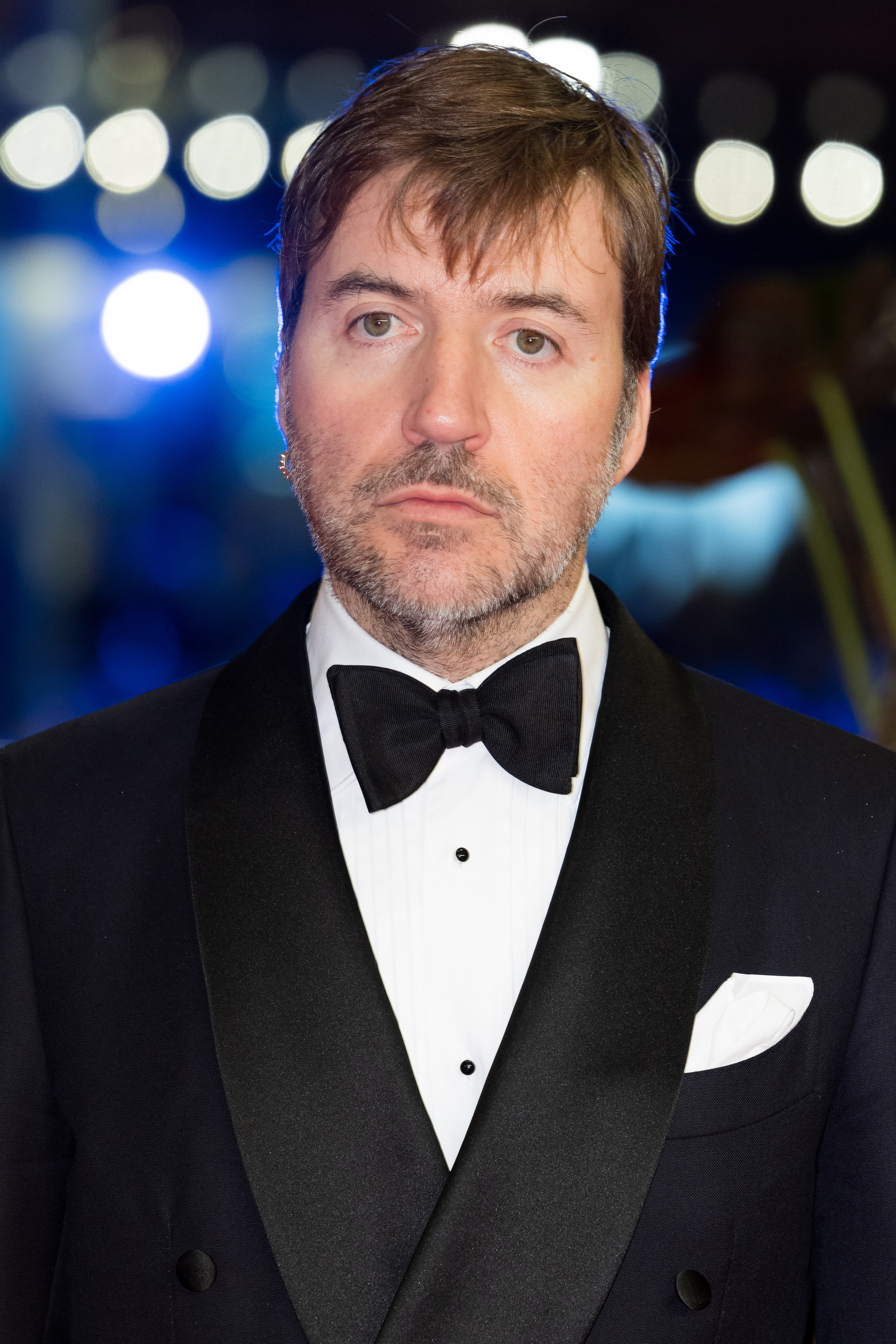
- Serra in 2024
- Born: 9 October 1975 (age 51); Banyoles, Catalonia, Spain
- Occupation: Filmmaker
- Years active: 2003–present

Albert Serra Juanola (Catalan: [əlˈβɛrt ˈsɛrə]; born 9 October 1975) is a Spanish filmmaker and producer. His films usually explore the imminence of death through the slow cinema genre.

He is best known for Story of My Death (2013), which won the Golden Leopard at the 66th Locarno Film Festival, The Death of Louis XIV (2016) and Pacifiction (2022). For the latter he was nominated for the Palme d'Or and the César Award for Best Director.

== Career ==
Serra is the manager of the production company Andergraun Films, set up by Montse Triola primarily to produce Serra's films.

His 2006's Honour of the Knights, an adaptation of Miguel de Cervantes novel Don Quixote, had its world premiere at the Directors' Fortnight section of the 2006 Cannes Film Festival. It appeared in seventh place on Cahiers du Cinéma's top ten list of 2007.

Serra's Story of My Death (2013), about an aging Casanova and his encounter with Count Dracula, had its world premiere at the main competition of the 66th Locarno Film Festival, where it won the Golden Leopard.

His French-language feature debut, The Death of Louis XIV (2016), which follows the final days of Louis XIV (Jean-Pierre Léaud), had its world premiere at the Special Screenings section of the 2016 Cannes Film Festival. It received the Prix Jean Vigo.

Serra's Liberté (2019), about a group of libertines that spend a night of sexual debauchery in a forest, had its world premiere at the Un Certain Regard section of the 2019 Cannes Film Festival, where it won the Special Jury Prize. It was received with polarizing reviews, for its graphic sequences.

His 8th feature film, Pacifiction (2022), about French contemporary colonialism in Tahiti, marked Serra's first film to have its world premiere at the main competition of the Cannes Film Festival, where it was nominated for the Palme d'Or. It received nine nominations at the 48th César Awards, including Best Film and Best Director. It ranked first on Cahiers du Cinéma's Annual Top 10 List for 2022.

His documentary Afternoons of Solitude (2024), about the Peruvian bullfighter Andrés Roca Rey, had its world premiere at the main competition of the 72nd San Sebastián International Film Festival, where it won the Golden Shell. It also appeared in first place on Cahiers du Cinéma's Annual Top 10 List for 2025.

His English language feature debut, Out of This World, is expected to premiere in 2027. It follows an American delegation traveling to Russia in the midst of the Russo-Ukrainian war (2022–present).

== Filmography ==
=== Feature films ===
Year	English title	Original title	Notes
2003	Crespià, the film not the village	Crespià	
2006	Honour of the Knights	Honor de cavalleria	
2008	Birdsong	El cant dels ocells	
2011	The Lord Has Worked Wonders in Me	El senyor ha fet en mi meravelles	
2013	Story of My Death	Història de la meva mort	
2016	The Death of Louis XIV	La Mort de Louis XIV	French-language debut
2019	Liberté		
2022	Pacifiction	Pacifiction – Tourment sur les îles	
2024	Afternoons of Solitude	Tardes de soledad	Documentary
2026	Sixteen Moments of My Life	Seize moments de ma vie	Concert film
2027	Out of This World		Post-production; English-language debut

=== Short films ===
Year	Title	Notes
2009	Bauçà	
2011	60 Seconds of Solitude in Year Zero	Collection of one-minute short films by 60 filmmakers
2014	Cubalibre	Part of the 101-hour installation The Three Little Pigs
2020	My Influences	Part of the Spaces series for the Thessaloniki International Film Festival
2022	Filmoteca de Catalunya 10 anys al Raval	Short film for the 10th anniversary of the Filmoteca de Catalunya

=== Film installations ===
Year	Original title	English title	Premiere exhibition venue
2010	Els noms de Crist	The Names of Christ	Barcelona Museum of Contemporary Art, Spain
2013	Els tres porquets	The Three Little Pigs	dOCUMENTA (13), Germany
2015	La singularitat	Singularity	56th Venice Biennale, Italy
2018	Roi Soleil	—	Galeria Graça Brandão, Portugal
2019	Personalien	—	Museo Nacional Centro de Arte Reina Sofía, Spain
2025	Tauromaquia	—	Centre for Fine Arts, Brussels, Belgium

== Accolades ==
Year	Award	Category	Project	Result	Ref.
2022	Cannes Film Festival	Palme d'Or	Pacifiction	Nominated	
2022	Louis Delluc Prize	Best Film of the Year	Pacifiction	Won	
2023	César Awards	Best Film	Pacifiction	Nominated	
2023	César Awards	Best Director	Pacifiction	Nominated	
2023	Lumière Awards	Best Film	Pacifiction	Nominated	
2023	Lumière Awards	Best Director	Pacifiction	Won	
2009	Gaudí Awards	Best Film in Catalan Language	Birdsong	Won	
2009	Gaudí Awards	Best Director	Birdsong	Won	
2023	Gaudí Awards	Best Non-Catalan Language Film	Pacifiction	Won	
2023	Gaudí Awards	Best Director	Pacifiction	Nominated	
2023	Gaudí Awards	Best Original Screenplay	Pacifiction	Nominated	
2023	Gaudí Awards	Best Editing	Pacifiction	Nominated	

Other awards:

- Honor of the Knights (2006)
  - 2006 Viennale Directors' Fortnight – FIPRESCI Prize
  - Best Feature Film, also Holden Award for Best Script – Special Mention, at the 2006 Torino Film Festival
  - Grand Prize at the 2006 Entrevues Belfort film festival
  - Best Emerging Director and Best Film in Catalan Language awards, 2006 Barcelona Cinema Awards
  - Selected by Cahiers du Cinéma as one of the 10 best films of 2007.
- Birdsong (2008)
  - 2008 Cannes Directors' Fortnight
  - Grand Prize at the 2008 Split International Film Festival
  - Grand Prize at the 2008 Entrevues Belfort film festival
- Story of My Death (2013)
  - Golden Leopard at the Locarno International Film Festival
  - Silver Puma for Best Director at the 2014 UNAM International Film Festival (FICUNAM)
  - Best wardrobe at the 2014 Gaudí Awards
- The Death of Louis XIV (2016)
  - Toronto International Film Festival – Official Selection
  - New York Film Festival – Official Selection
  - Winner in feature film category, 2016 Prix Jean Vigo
  - Best International Film at the 2016 Jerusalem Film Festival
- Pacifiction (2022)
  - 10th Feroz Awards – Nomination for the Arrebato Award (Fiction)
  - Tromsø International Film Festival - Winner FIPRESCI Prize
  - International Cinephile Society - Best Director (2022), Ex Aqueo with Laura Citadella (Trenque Lauquen)
  - Selected by Cahiers du Cinéma as the best film of 2022
