= Pascal Plisson =

French documentary filmmaker

- Born: 1959; Paris, France
- Occupations: Film director; Screenwriter; Documentary filmmaker

Pascal Plisson (born 1959) is a French screenwriter, documentary filmmaker, and director, known for his films exploring education, opportunity, and the human spirit.

== Biography ==
Pascal Plisson was born in 1959 in Paris, France. A self-taught filmmaker, he left formal schooling at the age of 15 and began traveling across the Americas. He began his career in 1984, creating television documentaries and sports reports, particularly on polo, for international networks including National Geographic and BBC.

He later focused on human-centered stories with a global outlook. His breakout documentary Sur le chemin de l'école (On the Way to School) was released in 2013 and won the César Award for Best Documentary Film at the 39th César Awards.

== Themes and style ==
Plisson is known for exploring global inequality through the lens of education, youth, perseverance, and cultural identity. His works often blend emotional narratives with observational documentary techniques.

== Filmography ==
Year	Title	Role	Notes
2003	Masai, les guerriers de la pluie	Director, Writer	Fictional film based on Maasai oral legends
2005	Les Mystères de Clipperton	Director	Documentary on the Clipperton Island expedition
2009	J’ai vu changer la Terre (episode)	Director	TV documentary series
2013	Sur le chemin de l'école (On the Way to School)	Director, Writer	Won César Award for Best Documentary
2015	Le Grand Jour (The Big Day)	Director, Writer	Follows children preparing for life-changing events
2020	Gogo	Director, Writer	Story of the oldest student in Kenya pursuing education at age 94
2023	We Have a Dream	Director, Writer	Features children with disabilities around the world pursuing extraordinary goals

== Awards and recognition ==
- César Award for Best Documentary Film – *On the Way to School* (2014)
- Audience Award – Mill Valley Film Festival (2014)
- Prix Henri-Langlois for Best Documentary
- INIS Prize – Montreal Children's Film Festival
