= Tito Lee =

German interdisciplinary artist, director, musician and DJ

- Born: Antej Farac; 1972 (age 53–54); Mostar, former Yugoslavia
- Education: University of Television and Film Munich
- Website: www.titolee.com

Antej Farac (born 1972), known professionally as Tito Lee, is a German interdisciplinary artist, director, musician and DJ, who lives and works in Switzerland.

== Early life and education ==
Lee was born 1972 as Antej Farac, in Mostar, former Yugoslavia. He grew up in an artist family and was influenced and couched in his adolescence by many artist friends of his parents, especially by Halil Tikveša and Nada Pivac. He studied parallel at the Sarajevo Film Academy as well as at Academy of Fine Arts in Sarajevo until 1992 when he was forced to stop his studies. Immediately after the Bosnian War broke out, he moved to Munich and 1994 began his studies at the University of Television and Film Munich where he earned his degree as a movie director and engineer for film and television. His professional name is a combination of former Yugoslavian President Josip Broz Tito and martial artist Bruce Lee. Since 2006 he is Creative Director and CEO of the Swiss agency El Patrol Art GmbH.

== Career ==
During his time in Munich, Lee realized several film projects, worked as director and editor for various music-videos and commercials, produced more than 200 trailers for film and TV productions and acted as a screenwriter and dramaturgical consultant for ARD, BR, and ZDF productions such as “Tatort” and “Der Fahnder.” In 1998 his unconventional commercial “Zukunft passiert”, created for the electronic retail chain “Saturn”, entered the official competition for Cannes Golden Lion. Acting as a creative director for various image campaigns for leading broadcasting companies, such as SKY, PREMIERE, KIRCH GROUP, MTV, TAURUS and ProSieben Media AG, Lee absorbed the language of popular culture. This resulted in his debut "Death of Techno" - a post-neo realistic vision of the turn of the century. In parallel to his Media Work, Lee engaged in different projects as a musician and DJ. With a special interest in experimental, progressive sounds he composed on commission as well as for his own projects and film-scores. He first gained attention as a cross-media artist with the electronic free art collaboration with Turkish Artist Bülent Kullukcu named “Karpati Turist” (later known as “Electric Lounge Orchestra”), which premiered at the Einstein Art Center during the MUG experimental electronic music festival. In his next work HOTEL ANNELIE, he created an artistic archive that includes a 111-minute film, associated sculptures, video installations, large format light boxes, photographs and pop art series. The movie ANNELIE was released separately in 2012 In 2016 Lee also became president of the Swiss non profit organisation “FLUX Art Festival”, an international festival for sustainable “art & science projects”.

== Filmography ==
- 2012 Annelie (feature film, 111 min., director)
- 2006–2008 Death of Techno (feature film, 117 min., director)
- 2008 Mixuga ( documentary film, 85 min., producer)
- 2004 Biel-Bienne (documentary film, director, BR)
- 2003 Beamte im Sattel (documentary film, 45min., director, BR)
- 2002 Sipan - ein vergessenes Juwel (documentary film, director, BR)
- 2002 Elektro (semi-documentary film, 45 min., director, HFF Diplomfilm)
- 1998 Blitz (short film, 6 min., 35 mm, director - DOP: Michael Ballhaus)
- 1998 Westend (short film, 12 min., 35 mm, director)
- 1997 Piranhas (short film, 6 min., 35 mm, director)
- 1996 Captain Cosmo (short film, super 16 mm, co-director)
- 1994 Rückkopplung (short film, 35 mm, director)

== Creative Director / Art Director (TV, Advertising, Music-clips and Promotion) ==
- DF1: Imagespots / concept & realisation
- CINE ACTION: „Sie lieben - wir auch“ / Sender-Kampagne (5 Clips) / concept & realisation
- Media Markt: „Hochhaus“ / concept & director
- Saturn: „Zukunft passiert“ / concept & director - Cannes 1998 Official competition
- MTV: „Zeit“ / Sender-Jingle / director
- BLUE CHANNEL & Beate-Uhse TV: erotic channel campaigns / concept & realisation
- Kirch Media: various imageclips - u. a. opening film of Cannes TV Messe 1999
- PREMIERE: various imagespots
