= Gijón International Film Festival =

Annual film festival held in Gijón, Spain

Coordinates: 43°32′00″N 5°42′00″W

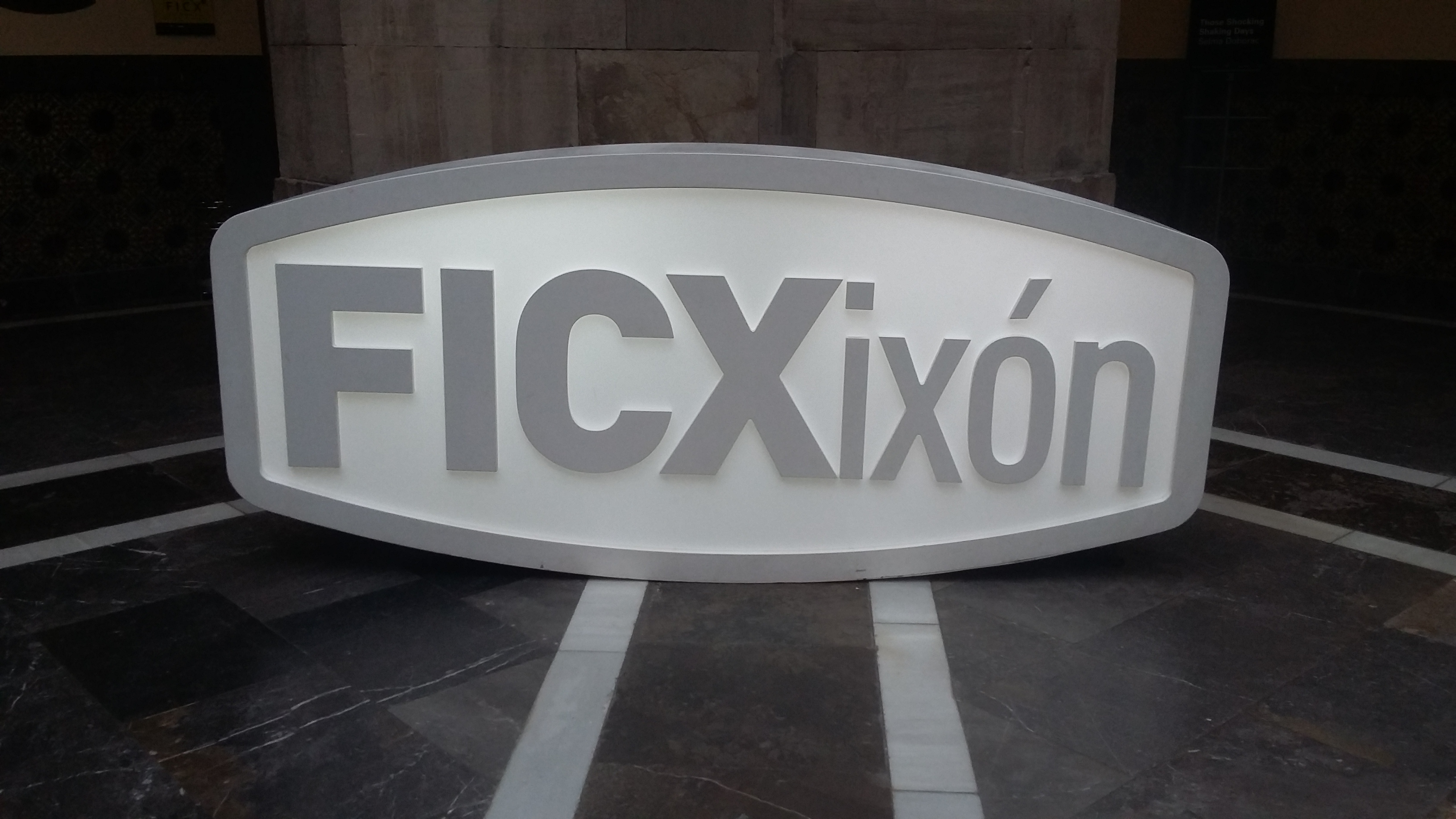
- Location: Gijón, Asturias, Spain
- Founded: 1963 (as "International Children's Cinema and TV Contest")
- Language: International
- Website: www.gijonfilmfestival.com

The Gijón International Film Festival (Asturian: Festival Internacional de Cine de Xixón or FICXixón) is an annual film festival held in Gijón, a city in northwest Spain. The festival is mainly concentrated on independent and auteur cinema.

Gijón's International Short Film Competition qualifies for Oscar and the Goya Awards.

== History ==
=== Foundation and first years ===
The festival's origins date back to 1963. In the beginning it was an initiative of the City Council of Gijón in co-operation with Caja de Ahorros de Asturias (Cajastur). Both entities co-operate with the Festival, the first as organizer and the second as sponsor.

The first year it was held, it was called Certamen Internacional de Cine y TV Infantil (International Children's cinema and TV contest). Between 1964 and 1968 it still kept the same name, only the last part, "children's", was substituted by "for children". Between 1969 and 1976 this last part stopped appearing in the Festival's name. From 1977 till 1978 it received the name Certamen Internacional de Cine para la Infancia y la Juventud (International Cinema Contest for Children and Teens). Although in 1986 the Festival began to put the text Gijón International Film Festival in front of its name, it was not until 1988 that it officially adopted this name. Every year the Festival appoints a Young Jury made up of teens between 17 and 25 years among those, who request it.

In 1995, José Luis Cienfuegos was appointed the festival's director. That year, the festival gained an attendance of 10,000.

In May 1996 the Entidad Mercantil Artístico-Musical Teatro Municipal Jovellanos de Gijón, S.A., body in charge of the organization of the event together with the City Council, was founded, and changed its name later into Divertia S.A.. This institution is in charge of the theatre's running, the festivities department and the organization of the Film Festival.

=== XXI century ===
By the early 2012s, the Gijón International Film Festival had earned itself a reputation as one of the most prestigious independent film festivals in Spain and Europe and was referred to as the Spanish Sundance.

In 2012, a huge scandal happened when the local authorities dismissed the director José Luis Cienfuegos and his team and appointed Nacho Carballo. Despite a 7.5 times rise in attendance that the festival achieved under Cienfuegos and a wide international acclaim, the authorities decided to 'change the direction' and make it a "more Asturian event". In the media it was called a shock move, soon more that 400 prominent filmmakers (including Pedro Almodóvar, Abel Ferrara, Fernando Trueba, Agustí Villaronga, Jaime Rosales, Alex de la Iglesia, Isabel Coixet, etc.) signed an open letter demanding reinstallment of Cienfuegos and his team or else they will boycott the event.

The present director, Alejandro Díaz Castaño, was elected in 2017 after a public tender to replace Nacho Carballo. Along with Díaz Castaño, a whole new management team headed the festival and introduced a series of novelties to enrich the festival.

Throughout the years, some of the most prestigious professionals in independent filmmaking have attended the festival, such as Abbas Kiarostami, Aki Kaurismäki, Todd Haynes, Pedro Costa, Paul Schrader, João César Monteiro, Seijun Suzuki, Jem Cohen, Kenneth Anger, Ulrich Seidl, Hal Hartley, Lukas Moodysson, Tsai Ming-liang, Claire Denis, Todd Solondz, Bertrand Bonello, Apichatpong Weerasethakul, Whit Stillman, Eugène Green or Philippe Garrel.

Among the festival's national and international guests, either as members of the International Jury or presenting their films in the various sections of the festival, are John Cale, Maria Schneider, Monte Hellman, Nicolas Winding Refn, Darren Aronofsky, Víctor Erice, Isabel Coixet or Carla Simón.

Gijón International Film Festival also comprises a series of events, such as courses, panel discussions, q&a's and daily concerts, as well as live music parties. Since 2017, it has organized a series of activities for professionals, under the name of FICX Industry Days: Push Play Work-in-Progress section, Cineteca FICX (co-produced with the Universidad Laboral), etc.

The festival awards various prizes in its competitive sections and collaborates in other initiatives with an aim to promote Asturian filmmaking industry. Said awards are decided upon by an International Jury (made up of at least 5 professionals from different countries), a Young Jury (50 young people between 17 and 26 years of age) and, since 2005, a FIPRESCI jury.

== Sections and competitions ==
=== Main competitions ===
The deadline to present films is September 20, projects to apply to the Enfants Terribles sidebar are taken until August 25.

Tierres en Trance Competition is dedicated to Ibero-American films, the section is judged by the FIPRESCI jury.

Albar Competition is dedicated to established names in contemporary cinema.

Retueyos Competition focuses on emerging talents and their first, second and third films.

=== Other awards and sections ===
Along with the three main competitions, the Gijón International Film Festival also presents: Audience Award, Enfants Terribles Award for Best Feature Film, several Young Jury's Awards, DAMA Award for Best Script of a Spanish Film, AMAE Award for Best Editing of a Spanish Film, DCP Deluxe Award for Best Director of a Spanish Feature Film, CIMA Award for Best Feature Film Directed by a Woman, Principality of Asturias New Filmmakers Award, and many more.

As a part of a non-competition program, the festival hosts retrospectives of various directors and audiovisual artists.

=== Nacho Martínez award ===
In 2002, the Gijón International Film Festival established a National Film Award named after 'Nacho Martínez' to honour people who have contributed significantly to the film industry. The statuette, awarded to the winners, is a unique sculpture made by Jaime Herrero.

- 2002 – Juan Echanove, actor;
- 2003 – Gonzalo Suárez, director;
- 2004 – Eusebio Poncela, actor;
- 2005 – Assumpta Serna, actress, she co-starred with him in Matador;
- 2006 – Maribel Verdú, actress;
- 2007 – Marisa Paredes;
- 2008 – Mercedes Sampietro, actress;
- 2009 – Ángela Molina, actress;
- 2010 – Charo López, actress;
- 2011 – Montxo Armendáriz, film director and screenwriter;
- 2012 – Luis San Narciso, artistic director;
- 2013 – Carmelo Gómez, actor;
- 2014 – Imanol Arias, actor;
- 2015 – José Sacristán, actor;
- 2016 – Lluís Homar, actor and theater director;
- 2017 – Verónica Forqué, actress;
- 2018 – Jaun Diego, Andalusian actor;
- 2019 – Ernesto Alterio, actor;

In 2020, when Jaime Herrero, an artist and the creator of the statuettes presented to the Nacho Martínez Award winners, died, the award was discontinued.
