= José Luis Guerín =

Spanish filmmaker and educator (born 1960)

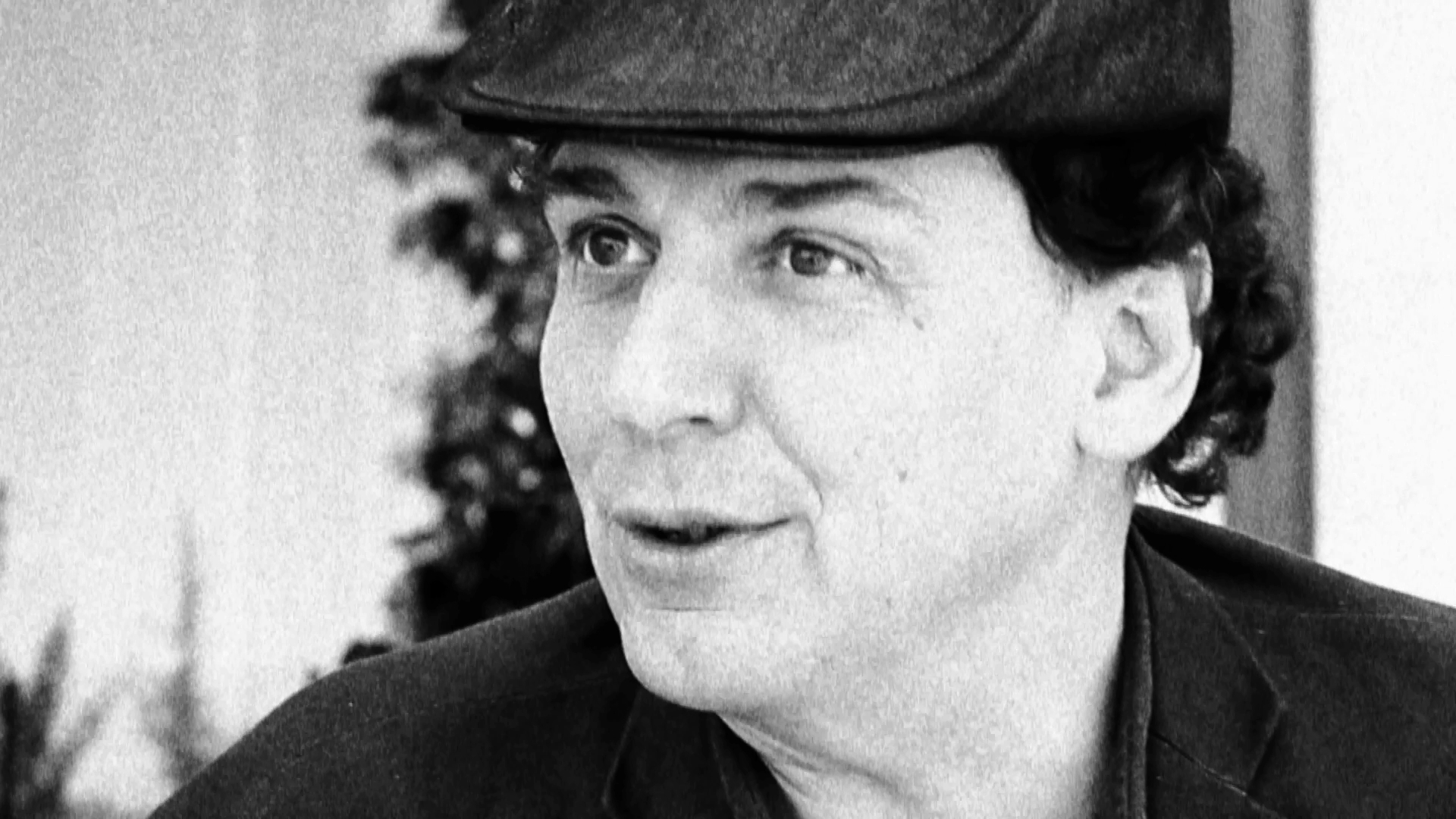
- José Luis Guerín
- Born: 1960 (age 64–65); Barcelona, Spain
- Occupation(s): Film director, screenwriter

José Luis Guerín (born 1960) is a Spanish filmmaker and educator known for Train of Shadows (1997), En construcción (2001), and The Academy of Muses (2015).

== Style and influences ==
As a young cinephile, Guerín attended many film screenings, made films on Super 8 and 16mm and sought out and befriended many of the filmmakers he admired, including Robert Bresson, Raoul Ruiz and Philippe Garrel. Guerín's films are often described as being influenced by the Lumière Brothers, Howard Hawks, Yasujirō Ozu and John Ford (Guerín went so far as to shoot a film in Cong the setting of Innisfree in Ford's The Quiet Man).

Guerín is known for his meditative and intellectually curious work in both documentary and narrative filmmaking. Describing Guerín in an introduction to a series of his films, the programmers of the Harvard Film Archive wrote: "Guerín's films purposefully confound narrative and documentary traditions, discovering rich narrative threads woven into the tapestries of his real life subjects and unraveling mysteries without solutions that nevertheless leave the viewer deeply satisfied."

== Filmography ==
- Berta's Motives (1985)
- Souvenir (1986, Short)
- City Life (1990)
- Innisfree (1990)
- Train of Shadows (1997)
- En construcción AKA Work in Progress (2001)
- Tren Estrasburgo-Paris/ Mujer esperando al tranvia (2006, Short)
- Unas fotos en la ciudad de Sylvia (2007)
- In the City of Sylvia (2007)
- Guest (2010)
- Correspondences: Jonas Mekas - J. L. Guerin (2011)
- Dos cartas a Ana AKA Two Letters for Ana (2011, Short)
- Recuerdos de una manana AKA Memories of a Morning (2011)
- L’Accademia delle muse AKA The Academy of Muses (2015)
- Le Saphir de Saint-Louis AKA The Sapphire of St. Louis (2015)
- De una Isla (2019, Short)

== Awards ==
His film Under Construction (En construcción) won the Special Prize of the Jury in the San Sebastián Film Festival in 2001 and the Goya Prize for Best Documentary in 2002.
