= Carles Santos =

Spanish artist

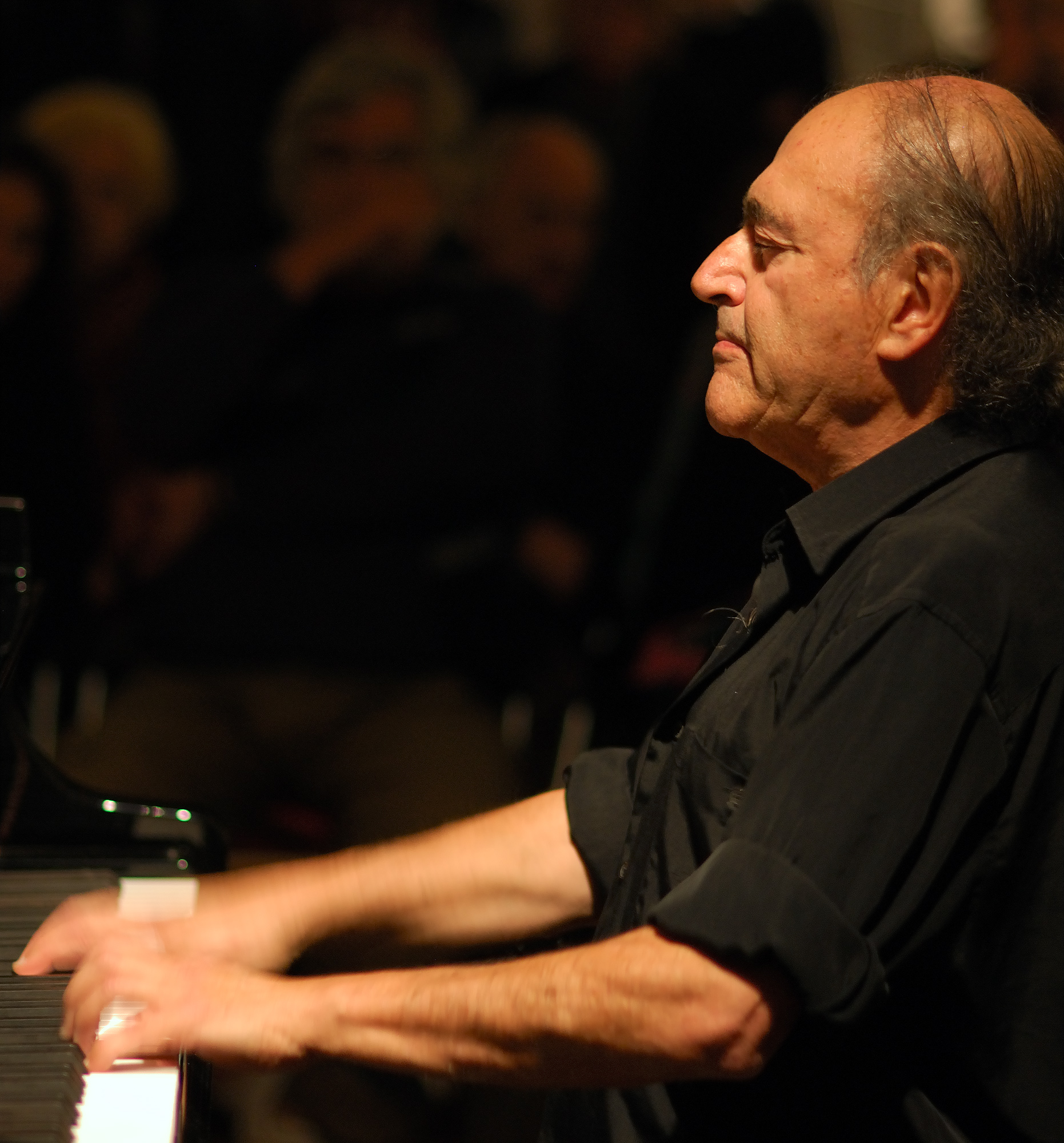
Carles Santos in Berlin 2007

Carles Santos (Valencian pronunciation: [ˈkaɾles ˈsantos]; 1 July 1940 – 4 December 2017) was a Spanish artist who began his career as a pianist and later worked in many other creative disciplines, including musical composition, filmmaking, screenwriting, acting, scenic musical shows, graphics, montage, sculpture, photography, poetry, and prose.

== Biography ==
Born in Vinaròs, Valencian Community (Spain) Carles Santos began his formal musical education at the prestigious Conservatori Superior de Música del Liceu in Barcelona. There, he received awards that gave him the opportunity to continue his studies in Paris, where he worked with Magda Tagliaferro, Jacques Février, Robert Casadesus, and Marguerite Long, among others. Later he studied with Harry Datymer in Switzerland. In 1961, he began his career as a pianist, with a repertoire that included works by Béla Bartók, Arnold Schoenberg, and Anton Webern. During these years, he also played the musical parts of Joan Brossa's Concert Irregular, which premiered in Barcelona and New York as part of the commemoration of the 75th birthday of Joan Miró. A grant awarded by the Juan March Foundation in 1968 allowed Santos to move to the United States, where he met and worked with a number of avant-garde artists, principally Philip Corner and including John Cage.

In the late 1960s, Santos turned his attention to the production of films, and his oeuvre in this discipline eventually grew to include short films, full-length films, documentaries, and videos. Over the years, he collaborated with such directors as Pere Portabella, Jordi Cadena, and Carles Durán. His own first short film, L'Apat, premiered in 1967.

During the 1970s, Santos increasingly devoted himself to performing his own compositions, and eventually he decided to play them exclusively. His compositions are decidedly minimalistic and at the same time bear the stamp of romantic, traditional Spanish, atonal, and 12-tone music. In these years and into the 1980s, he took part in a number of important musical events, including the Festival d'Automne in Paris, the Musicalia in Milan, the International New Jazz Festival in Moers, Germany, the Biennial in San Juan, Puerto Rico, the Zürcher Theater Spektakel in Zurich, the Music Theatre Festival in London, Wintermusik '82 in Karlsruhe, Germany, and New Music America '83 in Washington, DC. In his performances, his goal was to avoid the boredom often caused in the audience by certain avant-garde music.

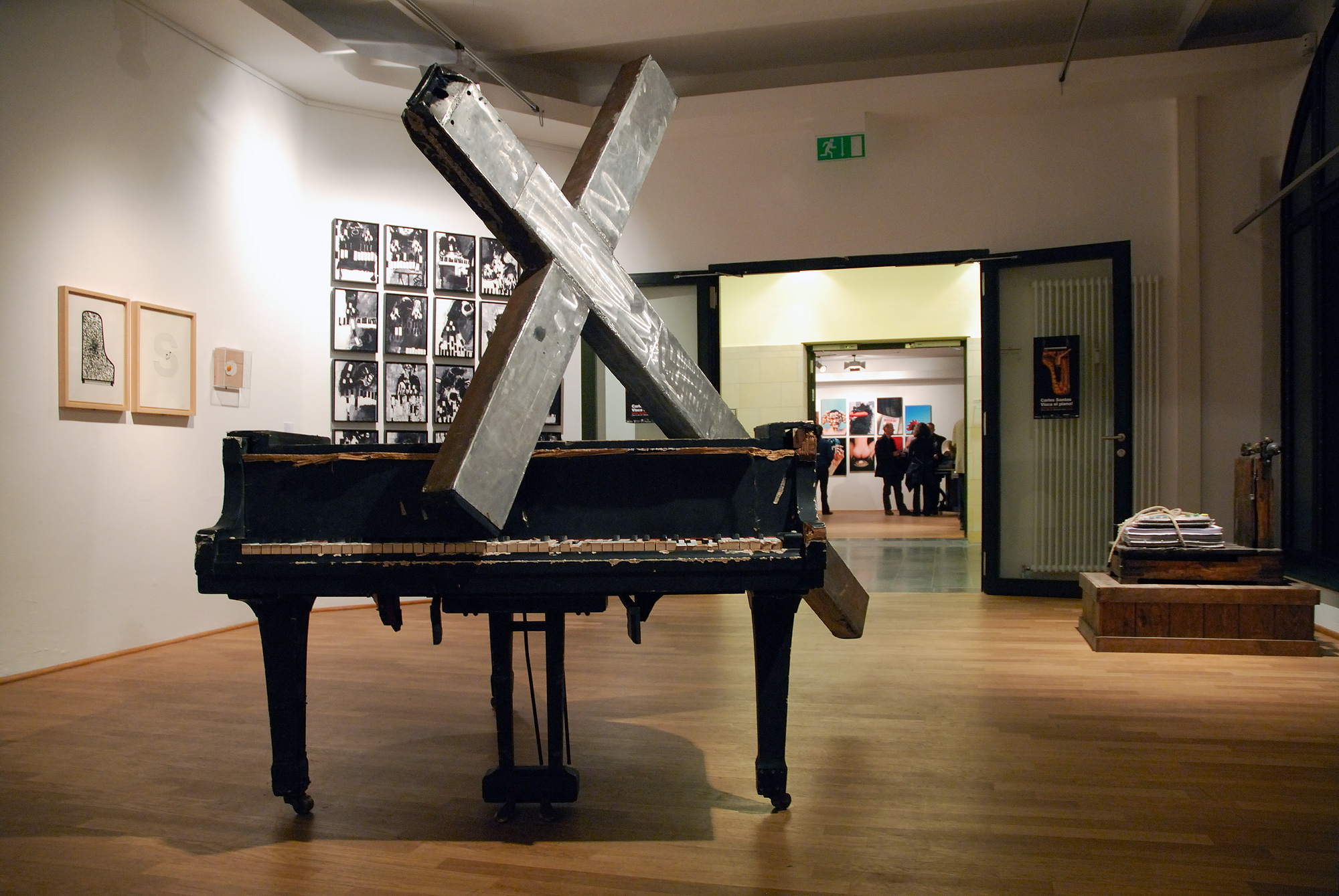
Exhibition I-Cervantes Berlin 'Visca el piano!' 2007

In the 1980s, Santos began to design scenic musical shows, which he staged in such venues as the Sydney Opera House, the Hebbel Theater in Berlin, and the Palau de la Música Catalana in Barcelona. His musical shows are marked by extravagance, sexual themes, and deliberate provocation, with the goal of questioning established concepts, albeit with a sense of humor. The notes to the 2006 exhibition of Santos's costumes held in Barcelona at the Museu del Tèxtil i la Indumentaria (Mariaelena Roqué desvesteix Carles Santos [Mariaelena Roqué Undresses Carles Santos]), indicate that Santos, through his shows, is expressing his loves and fears and attempting to banish his personal demons.

Santos was commissioned to compose works for a variety of special occasions, including the opening ceremony of the 1992 Summer Olympics in Barcelona and the opening of the 2001 Biennial of Arts in Valencia.

A major retrospective of Santos's works titled Visca el Piano (Long Live the Piano) was held in 2006 at the Fundació Joan Miró in Barcelona. The exhibition included videos of his scenic musical shows, graphic and photographic works, montages, and kinetic sculptures. The last category included a waltzing player piano that whirled around the exhibition hall under its own power while playing music by Bach and somehow avoiding running into the other exhibits (http://www.last.fm/music/Carles+Santos/+videos/+1-TZK3HCmZlmE).

In 2009, he was the invited artist at the Fira Mediterrania in Manresa (Catalonia, Spain).

== Selected awards and prizes ==
- 1990 Premi National de Composició de la Generalitat de Catalunya
- 1993 Premi Ciutat de Barcelona (for best musical composition)
- 1996 Premi Ciutat de Barcelona (for international projection)
- 1999 Creu de Sant Jordi de la Generalitat de Catalunya
- 2000 Premios Max (for best soundtrack)
- 2000 Premio de la Critica de Barcelona (for best musical show)
- 2001 Premios Max (for best composition and musical direction)
- 2002 Premios Max (for best musical composition)
- 2003 Premios Max (for best musical direction and musical composition)
- 2005 Premios Max (for best musical show, direction, and composition)
- 2006 Medalla de Oro del Circulo de Bellas Artes
- 2008 Premio Nacional de Música / Composición
- 2009 Medalla de la Universidad Jaume I de Castelló

== Discography ==
- 1977 Piano - Obres de Cowell, Cage, Webern, Stockhausen i Mestres-Quadreny (Edigsa)
- 1981 Voice Tracks (R. A. Taylor)
- 1984 Pianotrack (Linterna Música)
- 1986 Perturbación inesperada (Linterna Música)
- 1988 Carles Santos: Piano (Grabaciones Accidentales)
- 1989 Five Voices - Greetje Bijma/Shelley Hirsch/Anna Homler/David Moss/Carles Santos (Intakt Records)
- 1991 Belmonte - Banda Simfònica de la Unió Musical de Llíria - Carles Santos (Virgin España)
- 1992 Música para las Ceremonias Olímpicas Barcelona 92 - Fanfàrria de Cerimònies, Banda Simfònica de la Unió Musical de Llíria, Cor de València, cor d'Asdrúbila, Orquestra Ciutat de Barcelona - Carles Santos (On the Rocks)
- 1993 Promenade Concert: Músical per a una acció original de Xavier Olivé. 20 d’Abril de 1993 (Fundació Joan Miró)
- 1995 Himne del Segon Congrès Català de Cuina (Indústria Cultural)
- 1995 La porca i vibràtica teclúria (Institut d'Edicions de la Diputació de Barcelona)
- 1998 Un dit és un dit (CD inclós en el número 9 de la revista "Cave Canis", Barcelona 1999)
- 2001 L'adéu de Lucrècia Borja (Universitat de València)
- 2002 Sama Samaruck Suck Suck (Ópera-Circ) (K. Indústria Cultural)
- 2006 Amores Cage (Dahiz Producciones)

== Filmography ==
=== Musical composition for full-length films ===
- 1968 Nocturn 29 (together with Josep Maria Mestres-Quadreny; directed by Pere Portabella)
- 1970 Cuadecuc, vampir (Pere Portabella)
- 1975 Informe general (Pere Portabella)
- 1977 L'obscura història de la cosina Montse (Jordi Cadena)
- 1981 Vértigo en Manhattan (Jet lag) (Gonzalo Herralde)
- 1981 Barcelona Sud (Jordi Cadena)
- 1984 Pà d'àngel (Francesc Bellmunt)
- 1990 Ponte varsòvia (Pere Portabella)
- 1988 És quan dormo que hi veig clar (Jordi Cadena)
- 1989 Pont de Varsòvia (The Warsaw Bridge) (Pere Portabella)
- 1998 El pianista (Mario Gas)
- 2007 Die Stille vor Bach (The Silence Before Bach) (Pere Portabella)

=== Musical composition for short films ===
- 1969 Miró l’altre (directed by Pere Portabella)
- 1970 Poetes Catalans (Pere Portabella)
- 1971 Semejante a Pedro (Francesc Bellmunt)
- 1971 Calidoscopi (Beni Rossell)
- 1972 Umbracle (Pere Portabella)
- 1972 Cantants 72 (Pere Portabella)
- 1973 Advocats laboralistes (Pere Portabella)
- 1978 El barri del Besós (Carles Durán)
- 1979 Laberint (Agusti Villaronga)
- 1979 La delinqüència (Jaume Codina)
- 1979 Setmana de la sanitat (Jordi Cadena)
- 1979 L'ajuntament (Georgina Cisquella and Pere Joan Ventura)
- 1979 L'agressió quotidiana (Carles Durán)
- 1981 L'assemblea de Catalunya (Carles Durán)
- 1982 Eleccions a Las Cortes 28-10-82 (Isona Passola)
- 1989 Romàntic (Aurora Corminas)
- 1991 Clara foc (Judith Colell)
- 1992 Art a Catalunya (Pere Portabella)
- 2000 Foc al càntir (Frederic Amat)

=== Film direction ===
- 1967 L'apat
- 1967 L'espectador. Habitació amb rellotge. La Ilum. Conversa
- 1968 La cadira
- 1969 Preludi de Chopin, Opus 28 No. 7
- 1970 Play-back (together with Pere Portabella)
- 1972 Acció Santos (together with Pere Portabella)
- 1974 Preludi de Chopin, Opus 28 No. 18
- 1977 El pianista i el conservatori
- 1977 682-3133 Bufalo Minnesota
- 1978 Peça per a quatre pianos
- 1979 La Re Mi La

== Scenic musical shows ==
- 1983 Beethoven, si tanco la tapa . . . què passa?
- 1983 Té fina la fina petxina de Xina?
- 1985 Arganchulla, Arganchulla Gallac
- 1989 Tramuntana Tremens
- 1991 La grenya de Pasqual Picanya
- 1992 Asdrúbila
- 1995 L'esplèndida vergonya del fet mal fet
- 1996 Figasantos-fagotrop: missatge al contestador, soparem a les nou
- 1996 La Pantera Imperial
- 2000 Ricardo i Elena
- 2000 El Barbero de Sevilla
- 2006 El fervor de la perseverança
- 2008 Brossalobrossotdebrossat
