= Pere Portabella =

Spanish politician film producer (born 1927)

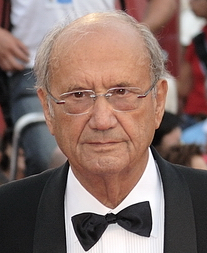
- Portabella in 2009

Member of Senate of Spain
- In office 15 June 1977 – 1 March 1979

Personal details
- Born: Pere Portabella i Ràfols; February 11, 1927 (age 99) Figueres, Catalonia, Spain
- Website: pereportabella.com

Pere Portabella i Ràfols (Catalan pronunciation: [ˈpeɾə ˌpɔɾtəˈβeʎəj ˈrafuls]; born February 11, 1927) is a Spanish politician, director, and producer. In 1977, he was elected Senator in Spain's first democratic elections and participated in the writing of the Spanish Constitution

As a filmmaker, his style is experimental, reaching new aspects of film language, often with a poetic tone and social content. Portabella is hailed as an iconic figure in Spanish film.

== Film career ==
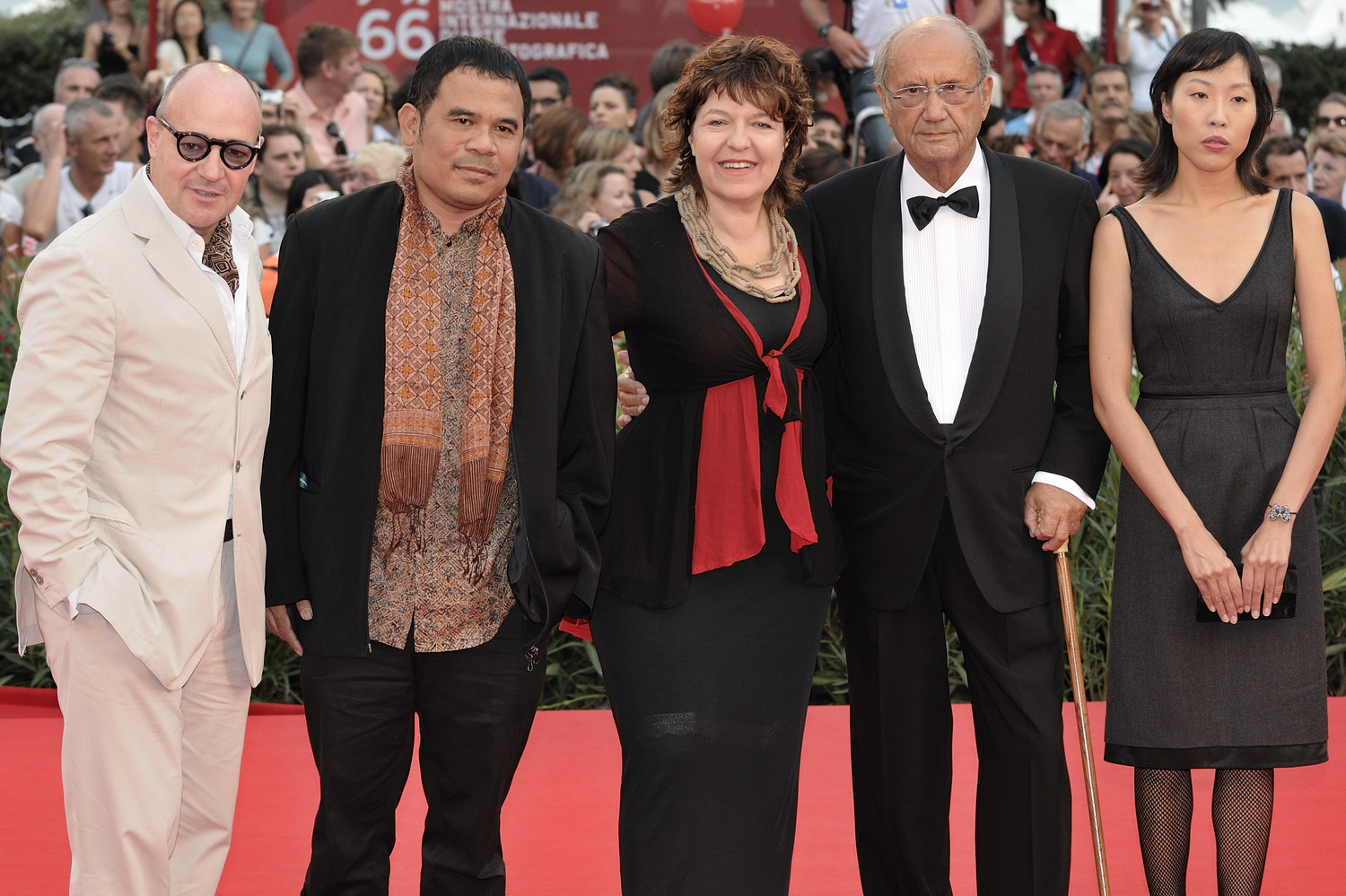
Portabella (second from right) at the 66th Venice Film Festival

Raised among the great Catalan industrial bourgeoisie, Portabella moved at an early age to study chemistry in Madrid. There he met artists such as Joan Ponç, Antoni Tàpies and students at the Escuela Oficial de Cine (EOC), including Carlos Saura and Julio Diamante. The first contacts Portabella made with the world of cinema came in 1958, where he met Leopoldo Pomés in order to make a documentary on bullfighting. Portabella took on the role of producer, while the co-director of the short film was Carlos Saura. Portabella lamented an inability to edit the material into a meaningful structure, remarking, "We got a lot of beautiful pictures, but they had nothing to say or offer." After the failure of this project, Portabella decided to devote himself fully to productions related to the socio-political reality of the period.

In 1959, he set up the production company Film 59, which began its activity with the production of two films influenced by Italian neorealism: Los golfos (Thugs, 1960) by Carlos Saura and El Cochecito (1960) by Marco Ferreri. In 1960, Los golfos was screened at the Cannes Film Festival, where Portabella met Luis Buñuel. He convinced Buñuel to return to Spain and shoot Viridiana (1961). Co-produced by Mexican Gustavo Alatriste - the Spanish company UNINCI headed by Bardem and Ricardo Muñoz Suay - and Movies 59, Buñuel's film, despite numerous script corrections made at the request of the Director General of Cinematography, openly parodied symbols of the Spanish state religion. Presented at the Cannes Film Festival in 1961, where the film earned the Palme d'Or, Viridiana caused a famous scandal.

Following Viridiana, Portabella collaborated with several other filmmakers. On the first project, Lejos de los arboles (1963-1970), written and directed by Jacinto Esteva, Portabella was credited only as associate producer owing to a desire not to be linked to the school in Barcelona. In 1965, Portabella wrote II Momento Della Verita of Francesco Rosi. Then, in 1969, he produced Hydrangea, directed by one of the pioneers of alternative cinema in Spain, Aragon Antonio Maenza. After several more realistic films led to censorship and difficulties with the authorities, Portabella dedicated himself to the development of a radical cinematic language, leading to his first short film No contéis con los dedos in 1968. He subsequently collaborated with Miró on a series of films for the Fondation Maeght.

After the death of Francisco Franco in 1975, Portabella made a documentary on the subject of democratic transition, Informe sobre algunas questiones of general interes para una proyección pública (1976). In 1990, he made a fictional feature, Warsaw Bridge, a reflection on the relationship between literature and film, which marked a return to radical techniques. In 2007, Portabella directed The Silence Before Bach, which explored the relationship between the music of Johann Sebastian Bach and imagery. In 2009, he was a member of the jury of the 66th Venice Film Festival.

== Filmography ==
- No compteu amb els dits (1967)
- Nocturne 29 (1968)
- Cuadecuc, vampir (1970)
- Umbracle (1970)
- Cantants 72 (1972)
- Acció Santos (1973)
- Advocats laboralistes (1973)
- El Sopar (1974)
- Informe general sobre unas cuestiones de interés para una proyección pública (1977)
- Pont de Varsòvia (1990)
- The Silence Before Bach (2007)
- General Report II: The New Abduction of Europe (2016)

== Political career ==
Portabella was elected Senator during Spain's first democratic elections in 1977. He participated in the drafting of the Spanish Constitution. He has also been a member of the Parliament of Catalonia.

Since 2001, Pere Portabella has been the president of Fundación Alternativas, a Spanish think tank.

In 1999, he was awarded the Cross of St. George.

== See also ==
- Dau al Set
- Joan Brossa
- Carles Santos
