= 27th Lumière Awards =

2022 French film awards ceremony

- Date: 17 January 2022
- Hosted by: Laurie Cholewa

Highlights
- Most awards: Annette (3)
- Most nominations: Lost Illusions (5)

Television coverage
- Network: Canal+

The 27th Lumière Awards ceremony, presented by the Académie des Lumières, took place on 17 January 2022 to honour the best in French-speaking cinema of 2021. The ceremony was hosted by Laurie Cholewa for the fourth time.

Drama film Happening won the Best Film. Musical psychological drama film Annette garnered the most trophies with three awards.

== Winners and nominees ==
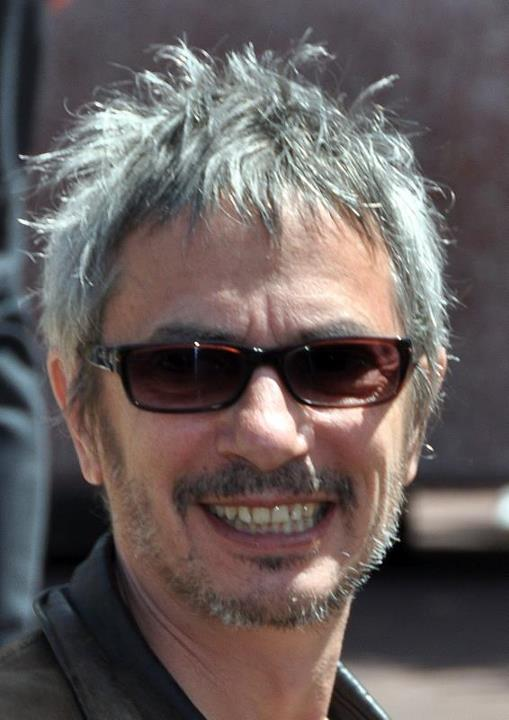
Leos Carax, winner of Best Director award

The nominations were announced on 10 December 2021. Drama film Lost Illusions led the nominees with five nominations. Winners are listed first, highlighted in boldface, and indicated with a double dagger (‡).

**Best Film** **Happening – Produced by Edouard Weil and Alice Girard; Directed by Audrey Diwan**‡: Annette – Produced by Charles Gillibert, Paul-Dominique Win Vacharasinthu, and Adam Driver; Directed by Leos Carax; Lost Illusions – Produced by Olivier Delbosc and Sidonie Dumas; Directed by Xavier Giannoli; Onoda: 10,000 Nights in the Jungle – Produced by Nicolas Anthomé; Directed by Arthur Harari; Peaceful – Produced by Denis Pineau-Valencienne and François Kraus; Directed by Emmanuelle Bercot	**Best Director** **Leos Carax – Annette**‡: Jacques Audiard – Paris, 13th District; Audrey Diwan – Happening; Xavier Giannoli – Lost Illusions; Arthur Harari – Onoda: 10,000 Nights in the Jungle
**Best Actor** **Benoît Magimel – Peaceful as Benjamin**‡: Damien Bonnard – The Restless as Damien; André Dussollier – Everything Went Fine as André; Vincent Lindon – Titane as Vincent; Benjamin Voisin – Lost Illusions as Lucien de Rupembré	**Best Actress** **Anamaria Vartolomei – Happening as Anne**‡: Suliane Brahim – The Swarm as Virginie; Virginie Efira – Benedetta as Benedetta Carlini; Valérie Lemercier – Aline as Aline Dieu; Sophie Marceau – Everything Went Fine as Emmanuèle
**Best Male Revelation** **Thimotée Robart – Magnetic Beats as Philippe**‡: Alseni Bathily – Gagarine as Youri; Abdel Bendaher – Ibrahim as Ibrahim; Sami Outalbali – A Tale of Love and Desire as Ahmed; Makita Samba – Paris, 13th District as Camille	**Best Female Revelation** **Agathe Rousselle – Titane as Alexia/Adrien**‡: Zbeida Belhajamor – A Tale of Love and Desire as Farah; Aïssatou Diallo Sagna – The Divide as Kim; Daphné Patakia – Benedetta as Bartolomea; Lucie Zhang – Paris, 13th District as Émilie
**Best First Film** **Gagarine – Fanny Liatard and Jérémy Trouilh**‡: Ibrahim – Samir Guesmi; Magnetic Beats – Vincent Maël Cardona; The Swarm – Just Philippot; Skies of Lebanon – Chloé Mazlo	**Best Screenplay** **Lost Illusions – Xavier Giannoli**‡: The Divide – Catherine Corsini; Madeleine Collins – Antoine Barraud; Onoda: 10,000 Nights in the Jungle – Arthur Harari and Vincent Poymiro; A Tale of Love and Desire – Leyla Bouzid
**Best Cinematography** **Annette – Caroline Champetier**‡: Happening – Laurent Tangy; Lost Illusions – Christophe Beaucarne; Onoda: 10,000 Nights in the Jungle – Tom Harari; The Swarm – Romain Carcanade	**Best Music** **Annette – Ron Mael and Russell Mael**‡: Gagarine – Amine Bouhafa, Evgueni and Sacha Galperine; The Summit of the Gods – Amine Bouhafa; Titane – Jim Williams; The Velvet Queen – Nick Cave and Warren Ellis
**Best Documentary** **The Velvet Queen – Marie Amiguet and Vincent Munier**‡: 9 Days in Raqqa – Xavier de Lauzanne; Delphine and Carole – Callisto Mc Nulty; Gallent Indies – Philippe Béziat; Le Kiosque – Alexandra Pianelli	**Best Animated Film** **The Summit of the Gods – Patrick Imbert**‡: Around the World in 80 Days – Samuel Tourneux; The Crossing (La Traversée) – Florence Miailhe; Pil's Adventures – Julien Fournet; Princess Dragon – Anthony Roux and Jean-Jacques Denis
**Best International Co-Production** **The Worst Person in the World ( (Norway) / (France) / (Denmark) / (Sweden) ) – Joachim Trier**: The Father ( (United Kingdom) / (France) ) – Florian Zeller; February ( (Bulgaria) / (France) ) – Kamen Kalev; Petrov's Flu ( (Russia) / (France) / (Switzerland) / (Germany) ) – Kirill Serebrennikov; The Restless ( (Belgium) / (Luxembourg) / (France) ) – Joachim Lafosse

=== Films with multiple nominations and awards ===
Films with multiple nominations
Nominations	Film
5	Lost Illusions
4	Annette
4	Happening
4	Onoda: 10,000 Nights in the Jungle
3	Gagarine
3	Paris, 13th District
3	The Swarm
3	A Tale of Love and Desire
3	Titane
2	Benedetta
2	The Divide
2	Everything Went Fine
2	Ibrahim
2	Magnetic Beats
2	Peaceful
2	The Restless
2	The Summit of the Gods
2	The Velvet Queen

Films with multiple wins
Wins	Film
3	Annette
2	Happening

== See also ==
- 47th César Awards
- 11th Magritte Awards
