= Lumière Award for Best Documentary =

Annual French film award

- Country: France
- Presented by: Académie des Lumières
- First award: 2016
- Currently held by: Put Your Soul on Your Hand and Walk (2026)
- Website: academiedeslumieres.com

The Lumière Award for Best Documentary (French: Lumière du meilleur documentaire) is an award presented annually by the Académie des Lumières since 2016.

== Winners and nominees ==
=== 2010s ===
| Year | English title | Original title | Director(s) |
|---|---|---|---|
| 2016 (21st) | The Pearl Button | Le Bouton de nacre | Patricio Guzmán |
| 2016 (21st) | The Missing Picture | L'Image manquante | Rithy Panh |
| 2016 (21st) | Human | | Yann Arthus-Bertrand |
| 2016 (21st) | South to North | Sud eau nord déplacer | Antoine Boutet |
| 2016 (21st) | Tomorrow | Demain | Cyril Dion and Mélanie Laurent |
| 2016 (21st) | We Come as Friends | Nous venons en amis | Hubert Sauper |
| 2017 (22nd) | My Journey Through French Cinema | Voyage à travers le cinéma français | Bertrand Tavernier |
| 2017 (22nd) | Latest News from the Cosmos | Dernières Nouvelles du cosmos | Julie Bertuccelli |
| 2017 (22nd) | Merci Patron! | | François Ruffin |
| 2017 (22nd) | La Sociologue et l'Ourson | | Étienne Chaillou and Mathias Théry |
| 2017 (22nd) | Swagger | | Olivier Babinet |
| 2017 (22nd) | The Woods Dreams Are Made Of | Le Bois dont les rêves sont faits | Claire Simon |
| 2018 (23rd) | Faces Places | Visages, villages | Agnès Varda and JR |
| 2018 (23rd) | Lumière! | Lumière ! L'aventure commence | Thierry Frémaux |
| 2018 (23rd) | Makala | | Emmanuel Gras |
| 2018 (23rd) | No Farewells | Sans adieu | Christophe Agou |
| 2018 (23rd) | Plot 35 | Carré 35 | Éric Caravaca |
| 2018 (23rd) | The Venerable W. | Le Vénérable W. | Barbet Schroeder |
| 2019 (24th) | Samouni Road | | Stefano Savona |
| 2019 (24th) | Cassandro the Exotico! | | Marie Losier |
| 2019 (24th) | Each and Every Moment | De chaque instant | Nicolas Philibert |
| 2019 (24th) | No Man Is an Island | Nul homme n'est une île | Dominique Marchais |
| 2019 (24th) | Young Solitude | Premières solitudes | Claire Simon |

=== 2020s ===
| Year | English title | Original title | Director(s) |
|---|---|---|---|
| 2020 (25th) | M | | Yolande Zauberman |
| 2020 (25th) | 68, mon père et les clous | | Samuel Bigiaoui |
| 2020 (25th) | Just Don't Think I'll Scream | Ne croyez surtout pas que je hurle | Frank Beauvais |
| 2020 (25th) | Living and Knowing You're Alive | Être vivant et le savoir | Alain Cavalier |
| 2020 (25th) | Lourdes | | Thierry Demaizière and Alban Teurlai |
| 2021 (26th) | The Monopoly of Violence | Un pays qui se tient sage | David Dufresne |
| 2021 (26th) | Adolescents | Adolescentes | Sébastien Lifshitz |
| 2021 (26th) | If It Were Love | Si c'était de l'amour | Patric Chiha |
| 2021 (26th) | Kongo | | Hadrien La Vapeur and Corto Vaclav |
| 2021 (26th) | The Tie | La Cravate | Étienne Chaillou and Mathias Théry |
| 2022 (27th) | The Velvet Queen | La Panthère des neiges | Marie Amiguet and Vincent Munier |
| 2022 (27th) | 9 Days in Raqqa | 9 Jours à Raqqa | Xavier de Lauzanne |
| 2022 (27th) | Delphine and Carole | Delphine et Carole, insoumuses | Callisto McNulty |
| 2022 (27th) | Gallant Indies | Indes galantes | Philippe Béziat |
| 2022 (27th) | The Kiosk | Le Kiosque | Alexandra Pianelli |
| 2023 (28th) | We | Nous | Alice Diop |
| 2023 (28th) | La Combattante | | Camille Ponsin |
| 2023 (28th) | H6 | | Ye Ye |
| 2023 (28th) | Returning to Reims (Fragments) | Retour à Reims (Fragments) | Jean-Gabriel Périot |
| 2023 (28th) | The Super 8 Years | Les années super 8 | Annie Ernaux and David Ernaux-Briot |
| 2024 (29th) | Four Daughters | Les Filles d'Olfa | Kaouther Ben Hania |
| 2024 (29th) | Little Girl Blue | | Mona Achache |
| 2024 (29th) | On the Adamant | Sur l'Adamant | Nicolas Philibert |
| 2024 (29th) | Our Body | Notre corps | Claire Simon |
| 2024 (29th) | La Rivière | | Dominique Marchais |
| 2025 (30th) | Dahomey | | Mati Diop |
| 2025 (30th) | Bye Bye Tiberias | Bye Bye Tibériade | Lina Soualem |
| 2025 (30th) | Journey into Gaza | Voyage à Gaza | Piero Usberti |
| 2025 (30th) | Madame Hofmann | | Sébastien Lifshitz |
| 2025 (30th) | Orlando, My Political Biography | Orlando, ma biographie politique | Paul B. Preciado |
| 2026 (31st) | Put Your Soul on Your Hand and Walk | لماء ضع على يدك وامشي | Sepideh Farsi |
| 2026 (31st) | Lumière! The Adventure Continues | Lumière, l'aventure continue | Thierry Frémaux |
| 2026 (31st) | Sarkozy – Gaddafi: the Scandal of Scandals | Personne n'y comprend rien | Yannick Kergoat |
| 2026 (31st) | Tell Her That I Love Her | Dites-lui que je l'aime | Romane Bohringer |
| 2026 (31st) | Whispers in the Woods | Le Chant des forêts | Vincent Munier |

== See also ==
- Academy Award for Best Documentary Feature Film
- BAFTA Award for Best Documentary
- César Award for Best Documentary Film
- David di Donatello for Best Documentary
- European Film Award for Best Documentary
- Goya Award for Best Documentary
