= César Award for Best Documentary Film =

Cinematography award

- Country: France
- Presented by: Académie des Arts et Techniques du Cinéma
- First award: 1995
- Currently held by: Whispers in the Woods (2026)
- Website: academie-cinema.org

The César Award for Best Documentary Film (French: César du meilleur film documentaire) is an award presented by the Académie des Arts et Techniques du Cinéma since 1995.

== History ==
In 1995, director Marcel Ophüls protested that his film, the documentary Vigils of Arms: A History of Wartime Journalism on the Bosnian War, was eligible only in the usual categories as a work of fiction. The César Academy exceptionally created the César for documentaries and documentary films, which did not satisfy Ophüls, on the temporary nature of the award, he resigned from the Academy.

The César for best documentary has been permanent since 2007.

Following a modification of the César rules on November 8, 2016, it is no longer possible for a film to combine the César for best documentary film with that for best film.

== Winners and nominees ==
=== 1990s ===
Year	English title	Original title	Director(s)
1995 (20th)	Caught in the Acts	Délits flagrants	Raymond Depardon
1995 (20th)	Bosna!		Alain Ferrari and Bernard-Henri Levy
1995 (20th)	Montand		Jean Labib
1995 (20th)	Tsahal		Claude Lanzmann
1995 (20th)	The Righteous	Tzedek	Marek Halter
1995 (20th)	Veillées d'armes		Marcel Ophuls
1995 (20th)	La Véritable Histoire d'Artaud le Mômo		Gérard Mordillat and Jérôme Prieur

=== 2000s ===
Year	English title	Original title	Director(s)
2007 (32nd)	Being Jacques Chirac	Dans la peau de Jacques Chirac	Michel Royer and Karl Zero
2007 (32nd)	La Fille du juge		William Karel
2007 (32nd)	Ici Najac, à vous la terre		Jean-Henri Meunier
2007 (32nd)	Down There	Là-bas	Chantal Akerman
2007 (32nd)	Zidane: A 21st Century Portrait	Zidane, un portrait du XXIème siècle	Douglas Gordon and Philippe Parreno
2008 (33rd)	Terror's Advocate	L'Avocat de la terreur	Barbet Schroeder
2008 (33rd)	Animals in Love	Les Animaux amoureux	Laurent Charbonnier
2008 (33rd)	Les Lip, l'imagination au pouvoir		Christian Rouaud
2008 (33rd)	Le Premier Cri		Gilles de Maistre
2008 (33rd)	Back to Normandy	Retour en Normandie	Nicolas Philibert
2009 (34th)	The Beaches of Agnès	Les Plages d'Agnès	Agnès Varda
2009 (34th)	Her Name Is Sabine	Elle s'appelle Sabine	Sandrine Bonnaire
2009 (34th)	Hollywood, I'm Sleeping Over Tonight	J'irai dormir à Hollywood	Antoine de Maximy
2009 (34th)	Tabarly		Pierre Marcel
2009 (34th)	Modern Life	La Vie moderne	Raymond Depardon

=== 2010s ===
Year	English title	Original title	Director(s)
2010 (35th)	Inferno	L'Enfer d'Henri-Georges Clouzot	Serge Bromberg and Ruxandra Medrea
2010 (35th)	La Danse	La Danse, le ballet de l'Opéra de Paris	Frederick Wiseman
2010 (35th)	Himalaya, le chemin du ciel		Marianne Chaud
2010 (35th)	Home		Yann Arthus-Bertrand
2010 (35th)	My Greatest Escape	Ne me libérez pas je m'en charge	Fabienne Godet
2011 (36th)	Oceans	Océans	Jacques Perrin and Jacques Cluzaud
2011 (36th)	L'Amour fou	Yves Saint Laurent - Pierre Bergé, l'amour fou	Pierre Thoretton
2011 (36th)	Benda Bilili!		Florent de la Tullaye and Renaud Barret
2011 (36th)	Cleveland vs. Wall Street	Cleveland contre Wall Street	Jean-Stéphane Bron
2011 (36th)	Into Our Own Hands	Entre nos mains	Mariana Otero
2012 (37th)	Tous au Larzac		Christian Rouaud
2012 (37th)	Le Bal des menteurs		Daniel Leconte
2012 (37th)	Crazy Horse		Frederick Wiseman
2012 (37th)	Here We Drown Algerians	Ici on noie les Algériens	Yasmina Adi
2012 (37th)	Michel Petrucciani		Michael Radford
2013 (38th)	The Invisibles	Les Invisibles	Sébastien Lifshitz
2013 (38th)	Bovines ou la vraie vie des vaches		Emmanuel Gras
2013 (38th)	Duch, Master of the Forges of Hell	Duch, le maître des forges de l'Enfer	Rithy Panh
2013 (38th)	Journal de France		Claudine Nougaret and Raymond Depardon
2013 (38th)	The New Watchdogs	Les Nouveaux Chiens de garde	Gilles Balbastre and Yannick Kergoat
2014 (39th)	Sur le chemin de l'école		Pascal Plisson
2014 (39th)	Comment j'ai détesté les maths		Olivier Peyon
2014 (39th)	The Last of the Unjust	Le Dernier des injustes	Claude Lanzmann
2014 (39th)	Il était une forêt		Luc Jacquet
2014 (39th)	La Maison de la radio		Nicolas Philibert
2015 (40th)	The Salt of the Earth		Wim Wenders and Juliano Ribeiro Salgado
2015 (40th)	Cartoonists - Foot Soldiers of Democracy	Caricaturistes - Fantassins de la démocratie	Stéphanie Valloatto
2015 (40th)	Les Chèvres de ma mère	Sophie Audier	
2015 (40th)	School of Babel	La Cour de Babel	Julie Bertuccelli
2015 (40th)	National Gallery		Frederick Wiseman
2016 (41st)	Tomorrow	Demain	Cyril Dion and Mélanie Laurent
2016 (41st)	The Pearl Button	El botón de nácar	Patricio Guzmán
2016 (41st)	Cavanna, jusqu'à l'ultime seconde, j'écrirai		Denis Robert and Nina Robert
2016 (41st)	The Missing Picture	L'Image manquante	Rithy Panh
2016 (41st)	Une jeunesse allemande		Jean-Gabriel Périot
2017 (42nd)	Merci patron!		François Ruffin
2017 (42nd)	Latest News From the Cosmos	Dernières nouvelles du Cosmos	Julie Bertucelli
2017 (42nd)	Fire at Sea	Fuocoammare	Gianfranco Rosi
2017 (42nd)	Swagger		Olivier Babinet
2017 (42nd)	Journey Through French Cinema	Voyage à travers le cinéma français	Bertrand Tavernier
2018 (43rd)	I Am Not Your Negro		Raoul Peck
2018 (43rd)	A viva voz. La fuerza de la palabra		Stéphane de Freitas
2018 (43rd)	Plot 35	Carré 35	Éric Caravaca
2018 (43rd)	12 jours		Raymond Depardon
2018 (43rd)	Faces Places	Visages villages	Agnès Varda, JR
2019 (44th)	So Help Me God	Ni juge, ni soumise	Jean Libon, Yves Hinant
2019 (44th)	De chaque instant		Nicolas Philibert
2019 (44th)	The State Against Mandela and the Others		Nicolas Champeaux, Gilles Porte
2019 (44th)	America		Claus Drexel
2019 (44th)	The Grand Ball	Le grand bal	Laetitia Carton

=== 2020s ===
Year	English title	Original title	Director(s)
2020 (45th)	M		Yolande Zauberman
2020 (45th)	68, Mon Père		Samuel Bigiaoui
2020 (45th)	La Cordillère des Songes		Patricio Guzmán
2020 (45th)	Lourdes		Thierry Demaizière and Alban Teurlai
2020 (45th)	Wonder boy Olivier Rousteing, né sous X		Anissa Bonnefont
2021 (46th)	Adolescents	Adolescentes	Sébastien Lifshitz
2021 (46th)	La Cravate		Etienne Chaillou and Mathias Théry
2021 (46th)	Cyrille Agriculteur, 30 Ans, 20 Vaches, Du Lait, Du Beurre, Des Dettes		Rodolphe Marconi
2021 (46th)	Histoire D’Un Regard		Mariana Otero
2021 (46th)	Un Pays Qui Se Tient Sage		David Du Fresne
2022 (47th)	The Velvet Queen	La panthère des neiges	Marie Amiguet and Vincent Munier
2022 (47th)	Animal		Cyril Dion
2022 (47th)	Bigger Than Us		Flore Vasseur
2022 (47th)	Gallant Indies	Indes galantes	Philippe Béziat
2022 (47th)	Those Who Care	Debout les femmes!	Gilles Perre and François Ruffin
2023 (48th)	Returning to Reims (Fragments)	Retour à Reims (Fragments)	Jean-Gabriel Périot
2023 (48th)	Heart of Oak	Le Chêne	Laurent Charbonnier, Michel Seydoux
2023 (48th)	Jane by Charlotte	Jane par Charlotte	Charlotte Gainsbourg
2023 (48th)	Rookies	Allons Enfants	Thierry Demaizière, Alban Teurlai
2023 (48th)	The Super 8 Years	Les Années Super 8	David Ernaux-Briot
2024 (49th)	Four Daughters	بنات ألفة	Kaouther Ben Hania
2024 (49th)	Atlantic Bar		Fanny Molins
2024 (49th)	Little Girl Blue		Mona Achache
2024 (49th)	Our Body	Notre Corps	Claire Simon
2024 (49th)	On the Adamant	Sur l'Adamant	Nicolas Philibert
2025 (50th)	The Bertrand's Farm	La Ferme des Bertrand	Gilles Perret
2025 (50th)	The Belle from Gaza	La Belle de Gaza	Yolande Zauberman
2025 (50th)	Bye Bye Tiberias	باي باي طبريا	Lina Soualem
2025 (50th)	Dahomey		Mati Diop
2025 (50th)	Ernest Cole: Lost and Found		Raoul Peck
2025 (50th)	Madame Hofmann		Sébastien Lifshitz
2026 (51st)	Whispers in the Woods	Le chant des forêts	Vincent Munier
2026 (51st)	The Fifth Shot of La Jetée	Le cinquième plan de La Jetée	Dominique Cabrera
2026 (51st)	Put Your Soul on Your Hand and Walk	ضع روحك على يدك وامشِ	Sepideh Farsi
2026 (51st)	Ride Away	À bicyclette!	Mathias Mlekuz
2026 (51st)	Sarkozy – Gaddafi: the Scandal of Scandals	Personne n'y comprend rien	Yannick Kergoat

== See also ==
- Academy Award for Best Documentary Feature Film
- BAFTA Award for Best Documentary
- David di Donatello for Best Documentary
- European Film Award for Best Documentary
- Goya Award for Best Documentary
- Lumière Award for Best Documentary
