= In a Whisper (2026 film) =

French-Tunisian drama film

- Directed by: Leyla Bouzid
- Written by: Leyla Bouzid
- Produced by: Caroline Nataf
- Starring: Eya Bouteraa; Hiam Abbas; Marion Barbeau
- Cinematography: Sébastien Goepfert
- Edited by: Lilian Corbeille
- Music by: Yom
- Production companies: Unité; Cinétéléfilms
- Distributed by: Playtime
- Release date: 14 February 2026 (Berlinale)
- Running time: 114 minutes
- Countries: Tunisia; France
- Language: English

In a Whisper (French: À voix basse) is a 2026 drama film written and directed by Leyla Bouzid. A French–Tunisian co-production, the film stars Eya Bouteraa, Hiam Abbas and Marion Barbeau.

The film had its world premiere at the main competition of the 76th Berlin International Film Festival on 14 February 2026, where it was nominated for the Golden Bear.

== Premise ==
After living for many years in Paris, a young woman returns to Tunisia to attend the funeral of her uncle. Staying in the family home shared by three generations of women, she is confronted with unspoken tensions, resurfacing memories, and shifting family relationships.

== Cast ==
- Eya Bouteraa as Lilia
- Hiam Abbas as Wahida
- Marion Barbeau as Alice
- Feriel Chamari as Hayet

== Production ==
In a Whisper is co-produced by Unité (France) and Cinétéléfilms (Tunisia). The project continues director Bouzid's exploration of family dynamics and personal identity, following her previous feature films As I Open My Eyes and A Tale of Love and Desire.

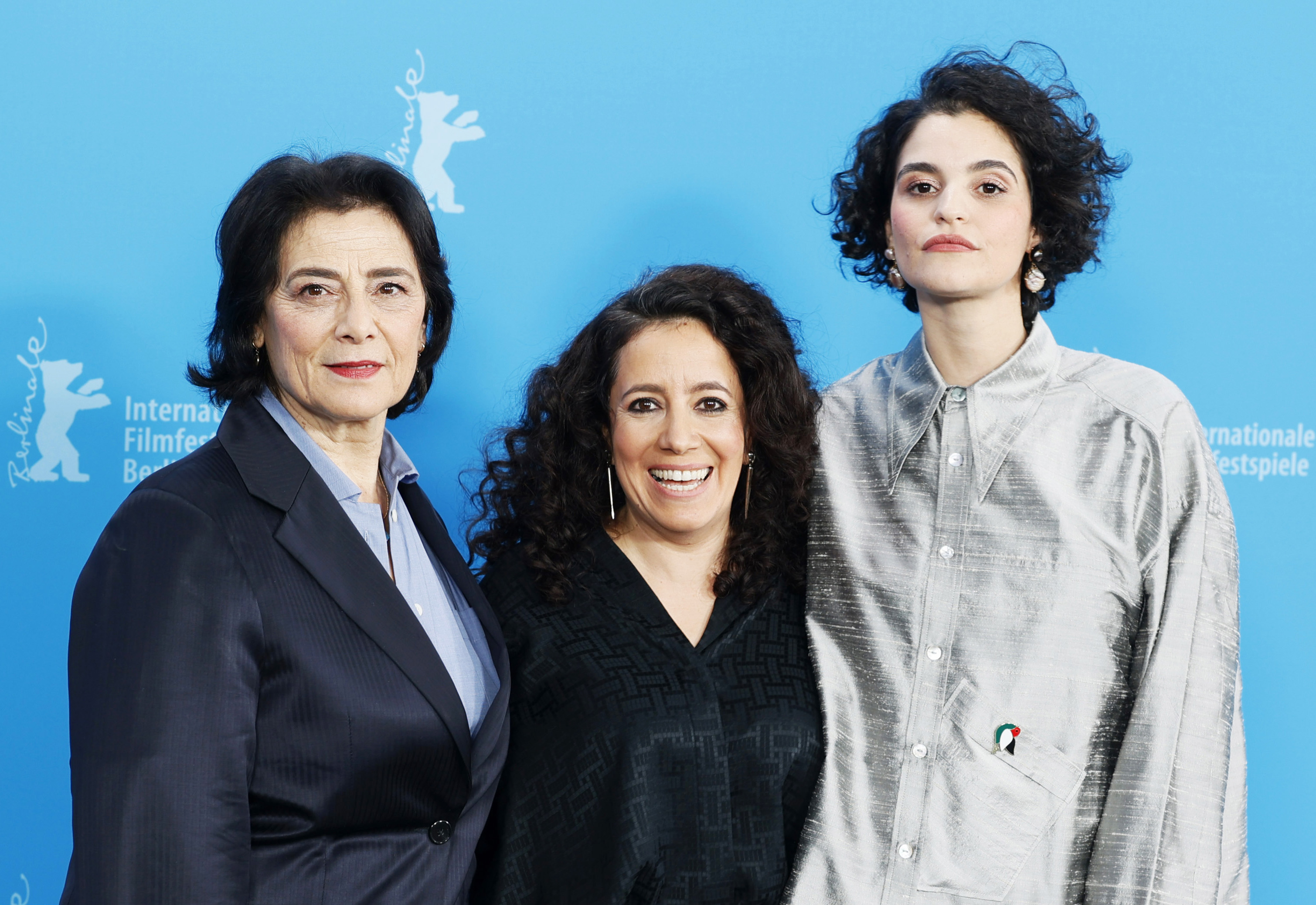
Hiam Abbass, Leyla Bouzid and Eya Bouteraa at 2026 Berlinale

== Release ==
In a Whisper was selected for the Official Competition of the 76th Berlin International Film Festival, where it had its world premiere on the 13th February, 2026.

It is scheduled for theatrical release in Tunisia on April 29, 2026.

== Reception ==
Jordan Mintzer of The Hollywood Reporter described the film as a "quietly effective" drama that examines clandestine homosexuality in Tunisia through both an intimate family portrait and a restrained investigative narrative. Mintzer highlighted Bouzid's approach to intertwining a personal coming-out story with the legacy of repression surrounding a deceased family member, noting the film's focus on generational contrasts within a middle-class Tunisian household. Fabien Lemercier of Cineuropa described the film as a "sophisticated feature" that conducts an intimate examination of a Tunisian family shaped by secrecy, repression, and unspoken truths.

== Accolades ==
Award	Date of ceremony	Category	Recipient(s)	Result	Ref.
Teddy Award	February 20, 2026	Best Feature Film	Leyla Bouzid	Nominated	
