= Ghalia Benali =

Ghalia Benali غالية بنعلي
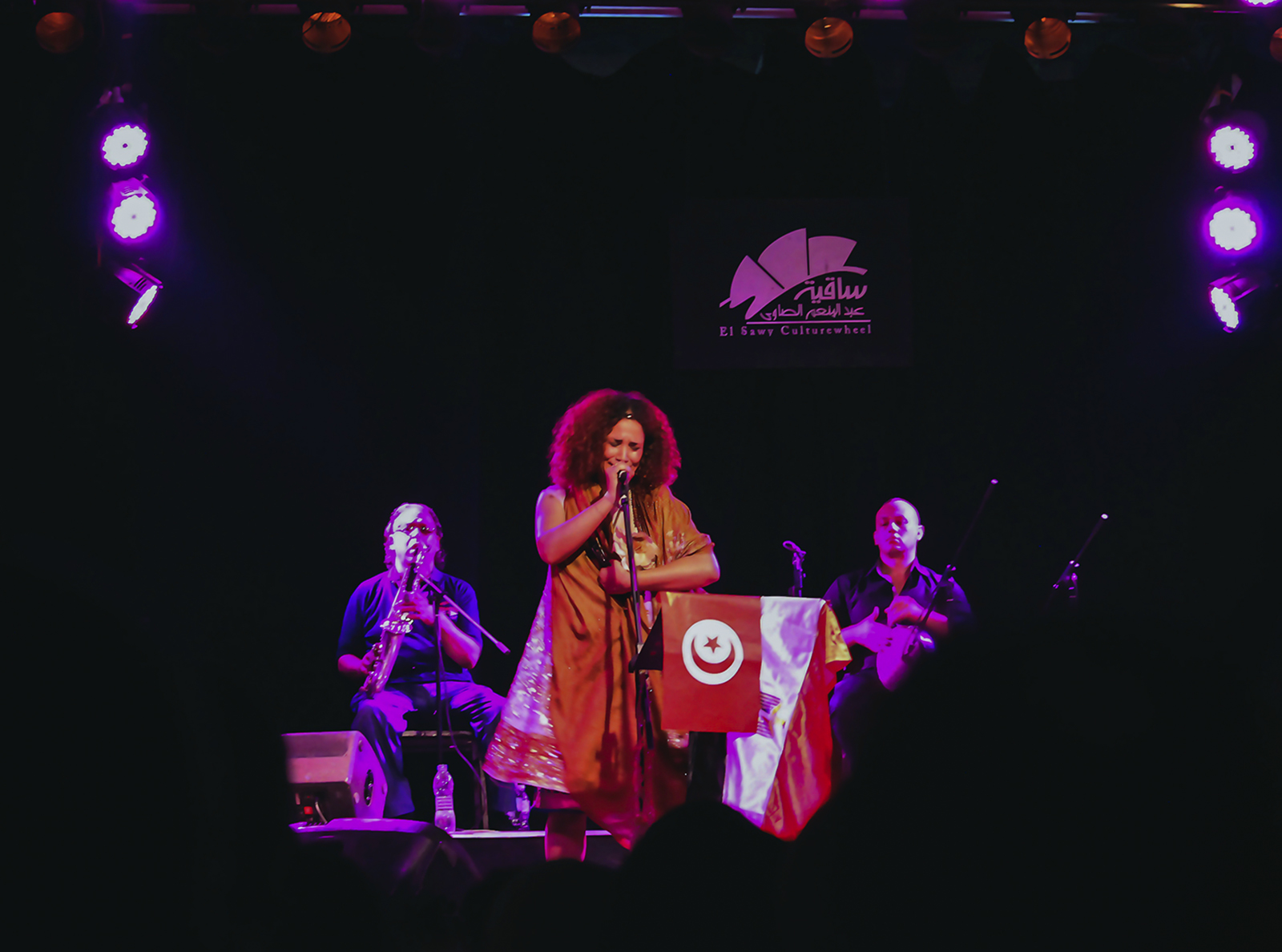

Background information
- Also known as: "Wind's daughter"; "Om Kalthoum's granddaughter"
- Born: 21 December 1968 (age 57); Brussels, Belgium
- Origin: Zarzis, Tunisia
- Genre: Contemporary Arabic music
- Occupations: Singer; songwriter; visual artist; actress; composer; writer
- Instrument: Vocals
- Years active: 1993–present
- Labels: Network Medien; Music & Words; De Werf; Warner Classics

Ghalia Benali (Arabic: غالية بنعلي, romanized: Ghāliya Binʿalī; born 21 December 1968) is a Tunisian singer-songwriter. Her music has been noted for its links to multiple genres and defining contemporary Arabic music. Benali's southern Tunisian upbringing and fascination with Middle Eastern and Arab legendary artists is palpable in her music style. Her voice has been dubbed as multicultural and polymorphic.

Born in Brussels, Belgium, and raised in Zarzis, Tunisia, Benali embarked on her music career in the early 1990s. After finishing her science and mathematics studies at the age of 19, Benali returned to Brussels to study graphic design at the Institut Saint-Luc of Graphic Arts. Soon she became a widely recognized singer in Europe, and in 2012 she made her debut on an Arab stage.

Some of the most projects Benali has worked on are Kafichanta, Wild Harissa, Romeo and Leila, Al Palna, and The Indian Hadra. Benali has performed songs by Oum Kalthoum, Allegory of Desire, and MwSOUL. In addition, she has acted, and collaborated with international bands such as The Spy from Cairo, Mad Professor, and The Metropole Orchestra.

== Early life ==
Benali was born in Brussels, Belgium, on 21 December 1968 to Ali Benali, a physician and cytologist, and Najia Somai, a beautician. She has three younger brothers, Zied, Taher, and Bechir. At the age of four, Benali's father ended his medical studies and decided to return to the family's homeland, where she grew up in Zarzis, a coastal town in southeastern Tunisia. As a young girl, she started exploring her melodic fascination with recitations of the Quran, Indian, and Egyptian cinema, in addition to Middle Eastern and Arab musicians such as Oum Kalthoum, Sabah Fakhri, and Adib AlDayikh.

With the support of her mother, Benali used to play dress-up at family gatherings and perform for her guests, yet due to her shy nature, singing for a crowd was rather challenging. She would occasionally pretend to be interviewed in front of her bedroom mirror. Before becoming an artist and musician, she hoped for a job that would allow her to travel and explore the world and even considered becoming a flight attendant. After finishing her science and mathematics studies at the age of 19, Benali returned to Brussels to study graphic design at the Institut Saint-Luc of Graphic Arts to express herself through imagery and artistry. After graduating, Benali became an independent artist and graphic designer. Soon her passion for music was further nourished after performing at her friend's birthday, which she considers the day it all started.

== Career beginnings ==
On 21 December 1993 Benali celebrated her 25th birthday, first on stage and the 10th anniversary of a venue called Amadeus. She performed with a band she met on stage, together with J.P. Gebbler, a Belgian jazz player, classical western musicians, and a flamenco band. In June 1994, CASA CAIUS invited her to tour in Portugal, where she performed in a line-up of 6 concerts in some of the most iconic historical places in North Portugal for the Roland company.

Four years later, the musician collaborated with stylist Vanessa Neirynck in the international styling competition "Brothers Cup" in China and came in second. Later on, she left for Rajasthan, India, to learn dancing. In 1999, Benali was invited by Kunsten-festival-des arts to perform in a concert in Bazaar in Brussels on a project with a new band that later on will be known as Timna/Wild harissa.

== Music ventures ==
=== Kafichanta ===
Hoping to present the music of Arab cabaret to Europeans and remain in touch with her origins, Benali performed with the trio "Kafichantas" with lute player Moufadhel Adhoum, and percussionist Azeddine Jazouli. The project was a means to take westerners on a journey of Arabic culture.

=== Wild Harissa and Nada ===
While experimenting with acting and cinema, Benali released her first two albums, "Wild Harissa", a collaboration with Timna in 2001, and "Nada" in 2002.

=== Romeo and Leila ===
"Romeo and Leila" is a Benali autobiography, for every mythical character mentioned in the fictional tale refers to someone she met in her real-life journey. The tale was performed by Benali as a musical in Belgium. The personal project was not recorded with a music label, but with the help of the Palestinian founder of the Amal Festival in Santiago de Compostela in Spain, Ghaleb Jaber, and the Flemish community of Belgium. The album was released in 2006.

=== Al Palna and The Indian Hadra ===
In 1991, Benali attended an Indian school in Brussels where she met sitar player Bert Cornelis. After a long jamming session, the song "Bharat" was recorded, which evolved over the years to set the tone of the "Al Palna" album. The name of the album signified the amalgamation of the Arabic and Indian cultures. The album was released in 2008, followed by a tour in India in 2009. Later on, Al Plana was reborn in Egypt as ‘The Indian Hadra’ with violin player Ayman Asfour, and Arabic percussionist Ayman Mabrouk.

=== Ghalia Benali sings Oum Kalthoum ===
The Oum Kalthoum album, which consisted of five songs, was recorded at the Jet studio in Brussels in 2008. Participating in this project were double bassist Vincent Noiret, rek player Azeddine Jazouli, and oud player Moufadhel Adhoum. The album appeared under the Dutch label "Music and Word" in 2010. The project was a huge success in Europe.

=== The Voice ===
The Voice management team at MBC channel contacted Benali to participate in their first season. She performed "Ya Mesafer Wahdak" by Mohamed Abdel Wahab.

=== Allegory of Desire ===
The Allegory of Desire was released in 2016 by Warner classics. Benali collaborated with Zefiro Torna and Vocalconsort Berlin on the project, which was inspired by The Song of Songs, a series of lyrical poems organized as a dialogue between a young woman and her lover in the last section of the Tanakh or Hebrew Bible. The music involved solo-voiced madrigals accompanied by instruments, vocal duets, and trios, a women's choir and polyphonic settings by composers such as Hildegard of Bingen, De Machaut, Dunstable, Agricola, Lassus, Grandi, Sances, Monteverdi, Schütz, Buxtehude, and J. Ch. The project included dialogue between cultures, with narrated texts by Sufi poets such as Rabaa Al-Adawia and a young aspiring generation of poets such as Egyptian Abdallah Ghoneim and Mohamed Zakaria. Lyrics were written and composed by Benali herself. The international cast took their project to Mechelen, Berlin, Hamburg, Nürnberg, Winterthur, Sevilla, and Vilnius.

=== MwSOUL ===
Her album MwSOUL was released in June 2017 on the W.E.R.F label. It is considered her most Sufi and spiritually oriented work. Most of the lyrics were written by her, yet the "MwSOUL" hit was written by the aspiring Egyptian poet, Abdallah Ghoneim. MwSOUL is a project that blends classic and contemporary Arab lyrics. The music using breath (brass) and beat (percussion) was written by Benali, referring to the soul and heart, arranged by Belgian group Mâäk, with whom Benali has been collaborating for over 20 years, and led by trumpeter Laurent Blondiau with the oud of Moufadhel Adhoum.

== MWSOUL Art Foundation ==
After years of struggling with unorganized management, Benali finally decided to take things into her own hands and founded an outlet to exhibit her art, music, and literature. The MWSOUL Art Foundation is a non-profit establishment that aims at raising awareness by reviving and connecting authentic cultural roots through different kinds of arts.

== Art projects ==
=== One Hour Before the Gods Awake ===
Immediately after finishing the MwSOUL project, Benali created a manuscript called "One Hour Before the Gods Awake" that includes 59 short fictional tales accompanied by 59 artworks. The images and texts tell an imaginary and fantasy-oriented version of real unfolding events. From reiterating old mythologies and legends about the beginning of humankind to recreating newer and more passionate versions, the manuscript is nothing but uninhibited creativity. Benali turned her passion into an electromusical project, with songs and videos that captured a strong message.

The artwork's line and structure is created by Ghalia Benali, while the text – or the tales – is by contemporary writers from all over the Arab world. The storyline has 59 images, with 59 texts representing the 59 minutes it took humanity to attain awareness.

=== Draw Me a Doll Project ===
Fascinated as a child by "The Little Prince" novel by Antoine de Saint-Exupéry, the renowned literature quote "Draw me a sheep," has constantly consumed Benali's thoughts. For years, the musician failed to purchase the doll of her dreams, so instead she made one. Trying hard to find each doll the face it was meant to have, she opted to leave them unidentified, which eventually matched the persona she always imagined.

The concept of "Draw Me a Doll" project is that what a person chooses to wear might suggest his/her character, yet it will never embody the soul and authentic nature. The project tackles themes such as freedom, inspiration, beauty, skin color, diversity, acceptance while highlighting Benali's opposition to prejudice, racism, and body shaming. The art dolls are made from spare scraps of cloth material, stuffed with raw sheep wool. They can be white, black, red, or green. The fabrics used for the dresses are vintage silk, lace, and leather, with gold and silver accessories. The scrawny arms and legs are similar to botanical roots.

=== Slides of life ===
In response to the sale of her childhood home, Benali created a series of miniature diorama boxes titled "Slides of life". Each box uses architectural dolls and recycled household materials (fabrics, jewellery, etc) to represent domestic characters and scenes. To create a sense of intimacy, Benali structured the exhibition so that each box could only be viewed by one audience member at a time.

=== Underskin ===
One of the most spiritual and philosophical projects Benali has worked on is "Underskin". During an extremely rough patch in the musician's life, feelings such as anger, jealousy, hatred, and sadness emerged, along with many unanswered questions. The spiritual aspect of the project was depicted in all the different answers found that carried the same message. This was a message of visualizing life's experience, standing in the middle of a universe, connecting the land and sky, and just being one with the surroundings. It all started in 2005 when Benali envisioned existence as a tree that gave out life through branches that intertwined and flourished. Her pregnancy was portrayed as a tree with its roots entrenched in a hemisphere that represented a mother's belly. The deeply embedded roots in the soil represented a myth regarding the unborn's personality, hidden deep inside her body.

Benali used ink, needle, and a vintage pencil plume and chose one of her paintings to be tattooed on her body. The message of "Underskin" is that one is the tree, the branches and the fruit. Inside oneself lies a fountain that never dries out.

== Musical style and influences ==
Benali's voice has been dubbed as multicultural and polymorphic. Spending the first four years of her life in Brussels, Benali's parents found comfort away from their homeland in music. Her mother highly appreciated French, Indian, and Egyptian music, while her father had an inclination towards classical music such as Beethoven, in addition to Iraqi and Jordanian songs.

Benali's music has been noted for its links to multiple genres. Benali's southern Tunisian upbringing and fascination with Middle Eastern and Arab icons such as Oum Kalthoum, Abdel Basit Abdel Samad, and Adib ElDayekh (AlMashayekh school) are palpable in her music style. Other influential sources on Benali's mystical and spiritual art are Inayat Khan and Sri Aurobindo, one of the thinkers in India, and the cultures of flamenco and gypsies of Rajasthan.

== Discography ==
- 2001 – "Wild Harissa" album, a collaboration with Timna, released by the German Label network.
- 2002 – "Nada" album produced by Ghalia Benali.
- 2002 – Viewmaster produced by "Cultuurhuis De Warande".
- 2003 – Two songs featured in "In My Tree" by Nicolas Thys.
- 2006 – Romeo and Leila, released by the Dutch label Music & Words.
- 2007 – "Po Cheri" with Hungarian gypsy band Romano Drom.
- 2007 – A collaboration with Urban Trad on the album "Erbalunga".
- 2008 – Featured in Spellbound album by Giacomo Lariccia.
- 2008 – Al Palna, recorded by the Belgian Radio and released by the Dutch label Music & Words.
- 2010 – Ghalia Benali sings Oum Kalthoum released by the Dutch label Music & Words.
- 2010 – Featured in Spy of Cairo album by Secretly Famous.
- 2011 – Featured in Oriental Express album with Nara Noïanc.
- 2016 – "Allegory of Desire", a Berlin vocal consort which is a collaboration between Zefiro Torna and Ghalia Benali and released by Label Warner.
- 2017 – "MwSOUL", a Ghalia Benali & MÄAk collaboration, released by the Belgian jazz label DE WERF.
- 2017 – Featured in Pondora et Cie album by Nisia.
- 2017 – Featured in Les Impénétrables album by Les Impénétrables Trio.
- 2019 – Fatwa pour l'amount
- 2020 – Featured in "Hysteria (Wuhan Fight Dub)" single by Dub Mentor, released on EnT-T.

== Filmography ==
- 2000 – Acting debut playing the role of Meriem in Moufida Tlatli's movie "La Saison des Hommes".
- 2002 – Second movie appearance in "Swing" by Tony Gatliff, which was a dedication to the gypsy jazz guitarist with some allusions to the legendary Django Reinhardt.
- 2013 – Guest appearance in Egyptian Ramadan TV series "Farah Laila" by Khaled El Hagar.
- 2014 – Special contribution to the movie "Jareedy", set in Egypt's Nubia, by composing and singing the main song of the movie "Jareedy".
- 2016 – Nominated by Leyla Bouzid to play the role of a suppressed mother of an 18-year-old rebellious daughter in the award-winning movie "As I Open My Eyes".

== Awards and nominations ==
- 2008 – Won the World of Music Award for best world music song, presented by an independent British organization "We Are Listening”
- 2013 – Named one of the best 10 concerts by The New York Times
- 2016 – Won the best actress award in Spain by Women for Africa Foundation for her role in "As I open my eyes" by Leyla Bouzid
- 2017 – Nominated by Les Magrittes du Cinema for "Best Hope Actress" for her role in "As I open my eyes" by Leyla Bouzid
