= Sami Outalbali =

French actor (born 1999)

- Born: 19 March 1999 (age 27); Poissy, Yvelines, France
- Occupation: Actor
- Years active: 2006–present

Sami Outalbali (born 19 March 1999) is a French actor. He rose to prominence for portraying Ilyes on the OCS drama series Grown Ups (2016–2019) and gained international recognition for his role as Rahim in the Netflix comedy-drama series Sex Education (2020–2021). He is also known for his roles in the supernatural series Mortel (2019–2021) and the drama film A Tale of Love and Desire (2021).

== Early life ==
Sami Outalbali was born in Poissy, Yvelines, on 19 March 1999. He has Moroccan and Guadeloupean ancestry. At the age of 3, he appeared in a Disney advertisement.

== Career ==
Outalbali first appeared on screen in the France 3 television film Il faut sauver Saïd in 2006. In 2011, he played a minor role in the comedy film Les Tuche.

He had his breakout role in the OCS teen drama series Grown Ups (French: Les Grands; 2016–2019), created by Vianney Lebasque, in which he portrays Ilyes, a gay high school student coming to terms with his sexuality. In 2018, he appeared in the first part of the Arte miniseries Proud (French: Fiertés), created by Philippe Faucon. In 2019, he starred in Laurent Micheli's Lola and Benjamin Parent's Un vrai bonhomme. That same year, he also appeared in the Netflix supernatural series Mortel as a missing teenager called Reda, the older brother of Sofiane (Carl Malapa).

In 2019, he joined the cast of the second series of the Netflix comedy-drama Sex Education in a recurring role. On the show, which marks his English-speaking debut, he portrays Rahim Harrack, a French exchange student who becomes a love interest of Eric Effiong (Ncuti Gatwa). He also returned for the show's third series. In August 2020, he starred in the music video for the single "Coup de Blues/Soleil" by Bigflo & Oli.

In 2019, he was cast in Leyla Bouzid's romantic drama film A Tale of Love and Desire as Ahmad Ouannas, a young French man of Algerian origin, who experiences a sexual awakening after meeting a Tunisian woman (Zbeida Belhajamor). The film premiered in the Critics' Week section of the 2021 Cannes Film Festival. For this role, Outalbali was nominated for Best Male Revelation at the 27th Lumière Awards and Most Promising Actor at the 47th César Awards.

In April 2022, he served as a member of the jury at the 5th Canneseries festival in Cannes. He appeared in Cédric Jimenez's 2022 film Novembre.

== Personal life ==
As of 2020, Outalbali resides in Paris.

== Filmography ==
=== Film ===
Year	Title	Role	Notes	Ref.
2011	Les Tuche	Jean-Wa		
2019	Lola	Samir		
2019	Un vrai bonhomme	Sonnie		
2021	A Tale of Love and Desire	Ahmed Ouannas		
2022	Novembre	Kader		

=== Television ===
Year	Title	Role	Notes	Ref.
2006	Il faut sauver Saïd		Television film	
2012	Vive la colo !	Sami		
2016–2019	Grown Ups	Ilyes		
2018	Proud	Sélim	Miniseries	
2018	Torn	Sofiane	Television film	
2019–2021	Mortel	Reda Kada	9 episodes	
2020–2021	Sex Education	Rahim Harrack	Recurring role; 15 episodes	

=== Music videos ===
Year	Title	Artist(s)	Ref.
2020	"Coup de Blues/Soleil"	Bigflo & Oli featuring Bon Entendeur	

== Awards and nominations ==
Year	Award	Category	Nominated work	Result	Ref.
2021	Angoulême Francophone Film Festival	Valois for Best Actor	A Tale of Love and Desire	Won	
2022	Lumière Awards	Best Male Revelation	A Tale of Love and Desire	Nominated	
2022	César Awards	Most Promising Actor	A Tale of Love and Desire	Nominated	
