= Tom McClung =

American jazz pianist and composer

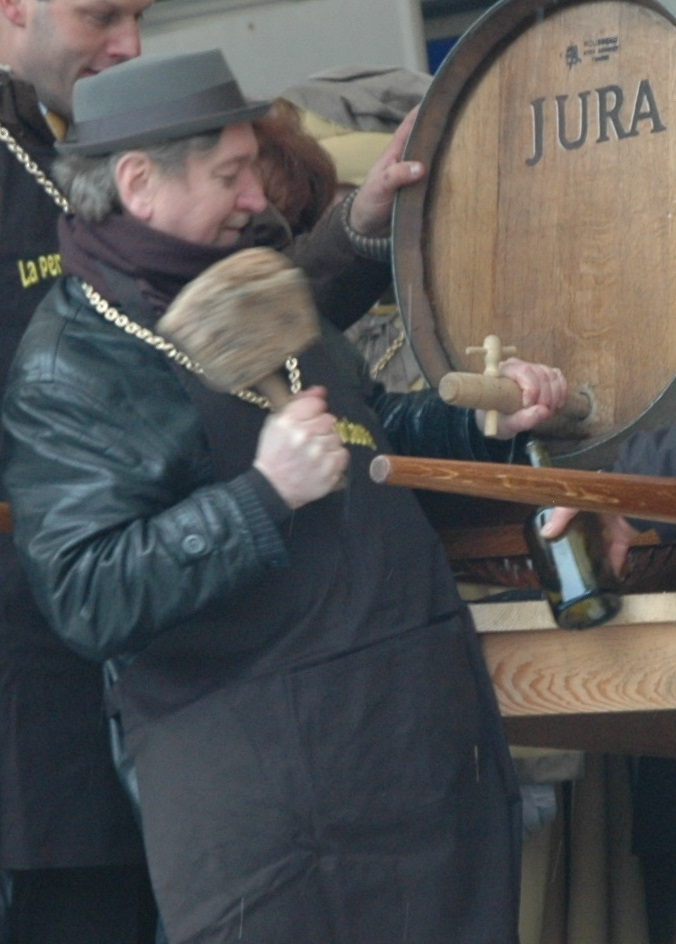
- McClung in 2009

Background information
- Born: April 4, 1957; New York City, New York, U.S.
- Died: May 14, 2017 (aged 60); Moulins-la-Marche, France
- Genres: Jazz
- Occupation(s): Musician, composer
- Instrument: Piano

Tom McClung (April 4, 1957 – May 14, 2017) was an American jazz pianist and composer.

== Career ==
McClung released several jazz albums, both as a leader and as a sideman to other artists. He played and recorded with musicians such as Archie Shepp, Yusef Lateef, and Marion Brown. He spent years residing, performing, and recording music with other artists in Paris.

Beginning in 1996, he toured and recorded internationally as a member of the Archie Shepp quartet. Their recording, Gemini, features two McClung originals and a guest appearance by rapper Chuck D of Public Enemy. McClung's solo piano recording Declassified (Blang Music, 2007) features arrangements and re-interpretations of classical composers. In 2008 he composed and performed the music for the film D'un mur l'autre - de Berlin à Ceuta by Patric Jean.

== Death ==
McClung died of cancer in Moulins-la-Marche, France, at the age of 60.

== Selected discography ==
=== As leader ===
- Burning Bright (2015) Matyas Zsandai, double bass Mourad Benhammou, drums
- This Is You (2010) duo with saxophonist Jean Jacques Elangué
- Declassified (2007) solo piano
- Double Helix (1997) duo with pianist Andy Jaffe
- The Telling (1996) trio with Nat Reeves and Stephen McCraven
- Locolypso (1991) quintet

=== As sideman ===
- Archie Shepp Quartet - Gemini (2007)
- Fredrika Stahl - A Fraction of You (2006)
- Archie Shepp Quartet - Kindred Spirits (2006)
- Stephen McCraven - Black Studies (2004)
- Yusef Lateef - Earth and Sky (1997)
- Yusef Lateef - Full Circle (1996)
- Stephen McCraven - Bosco (1996)
- Stephen McCraven - Song of the Forest Boogaraboo (1994)
- Dar Williams - The Honesty Room (1993)
- Yusef Lateef - Plays Ballads (1992)
- Yusef Lateef - The Tenors of Yusef Lateef and Archie Shepp (1992)
- Marion Brown - Offering (1992)
- Marion Brown - Offering II, Mirante do Vale (1992)
