= Gare du Nord (film) =

- Film poster
- Directed by: Claire Simon
- Written by: Claire Simon; Shirel Amitay; Olivier Lorelle
- Produced by: Richard Copans
- Starring: Nicole Garcia; Reda Kateb; François Damiens; Monia Chokri
- Cinematography: Claire Simon; Richard Copans; Laurent Bourgeat
- Edited by: Julien Lacheray
- Music by: Marc Ribot
- Production companies: Les Films d'Ici; Productions Thalie
- Distributed by: Sophie Dulac Distribution
- Release dates: 10 August 2013 (Locarno); 4 September 2013 (France)
- Running time: 119 minutes
- Countries: France; Canada
- Language: French

Gare du Nord is a 2013 French-Canadian drama film about four individuals whose lives meet at the Gare du Nord in Paris. Directed and co-written by Claire Simon, the film stars Nicole Garcia, Reda Kateb, François Damiens and Monia Chokri. The film premiered at the Locarno International Film Festival and was released theatrically on 4 September 2013.

== Cast ==
- Nicole Garcia as Mathilde
- Reda Kateb as Ismaël
- François Damiens as Sacha
- Monia Chokri as Joan
- Sophie Bredier as Agatha
- Michael Evans as the violent man
- Lucille Vieaux as lingerie shop woman
- Marvin Jean Charles as Kako
- Jean-Christophe Bouvet as the lawyer
- Nader Boussandel as Antoine
- Lou Castel as Ali
- André Marcon as François
- Jacques Nolot as Mario
- Samir Guesmi as Julien
- Ophélia Kolb as the mistress
- Paweł Pawlikowski as Joan's boss
- Christophe Paou as Gaspard

== Accolades ==
Award / Film Festival	Category	Recipients and nominees	Result
Locarno International Film Festival	Golden Leopard		Nominated
Festival International du Film Francophone de Namur	Best Actor	Reda Kateb	Won
