= Cyril Dion =

French poet, writer and film director

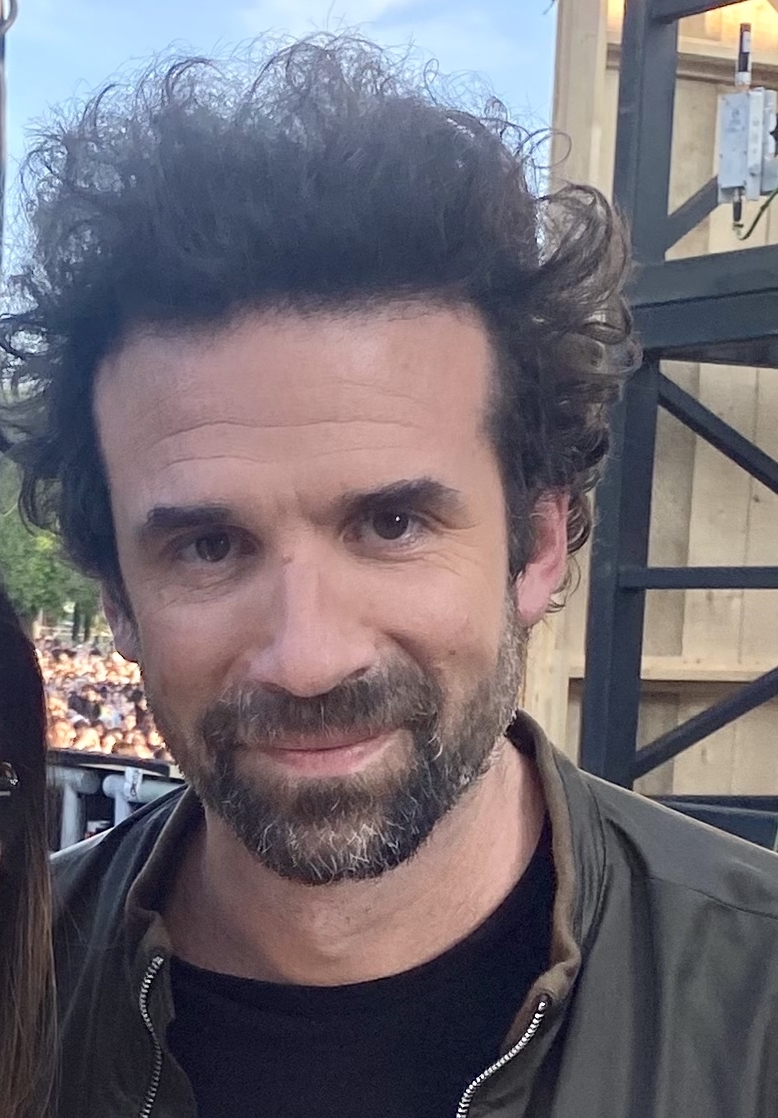
- Cyril Dion at Power the Planet in Paris June 2023
- Born: Poissy, France
- Occupations: Film director, writer

Cyril Dion is a French writer, film director, poet, and activist.

== Early life and education ==
After studying at the École d'art dramatique Jean-Périmony (drama school) and a very brief career as an actor, Cyril Dion coordinated projects for the 'Fondation Hommes de Parole'. He organized an Israeli-Palestinian congress at Caux in 2003, 2005 and 2006, and the first and second world Congress of Imams and Rabbis for peace in Brussels and Sevilla.

== Writing and film career ==
=== Books ===
Cyril Dion is the author of dozens of books: poems, novels, essays and books for young people.

He published his first collection of poems, Assis sur le fil, in 2014, followed by a second, À l'Orée du Danger, in 2022. In 2023, he takes part in La nuit est une page blanche, a book in which his poems (mainly haikus) dialogue with works by G&K (Stéphane Guiran and Katarzyna Kot). In 2024, he published La route sans fin.

In November 2015, he published an essay eponymous with his film Tomorrow, All Over the Globe, Solutions Already Exist. The book is published by Actes Sud in France and translated into English, German, Italian, Spanish, Chinese, Korean.

In August 2017, he published his first novel published by Actes Sud: Imago (not translated in English). The book is well received by critics and booksellers. For Libération, "the co-director of the film Tomorrow, delivers a first novel that a fast pitch can serve. However, if he gave himself up to the perilous exercise of the subject three times in a row, he took the side of his four characters, with an uncompromising empathy and a haunting writing." The book received Mediterranean First Novel Prize in 2018.

In May 2018, he publishes "Petit manuel de resistance contemporaine" (A handbook of contemporary resistance) at Actes Sud. As soon as it was published, the book ranked in the best-selling essays. For Charlotte Bloch in the French weekly magazine L'Express:

"Far from being moralistic or utopian, this incisive little book full of ideas is a real breath of fresh air because of its particular approach to modern ecology. Here, we do not beat around the bush, but we ask questions while trying to find practical and constructive answers. "

The book is translated in German, Spanish, Italian, Japanese, Korean.

2021 sees the publication of a new essay, eponymous with the film Animal, in collaboration with Nelly Pons.

=== Cinéma ===
He wrote and co-produced with Mélanie Laurent the documentary film Tomorrow (Demain), released in movie theatres in France on 2 December 2015. Tomorrow won the Cesar award for Best Documentary (Oscar equivalent in France) in 2016 and over one million people went to see it in movie theatres in France. It was later released in over 30 countries. It is cited by many French people as the trigger for a new kind of engagement in the course of the following years. For the French newspaper Libération "Cyril Dion succeeds in one hour and fifty-eight minutes, what decades of environmental struggle failed to do: lay the foundations for a" new collective fiction". It was shown at the 2017 Wales One World Film Festival in the UK. In the US, the movie was critic's pick of The New York Times, and gained a 93% approval rating on Rotten Tomatoes.

In September 2016, he was president of the jury of the documentary movie in Festival Biarritz Amérique latine. In October he was the Godfather of festival Atmosphère with the French singer Camille and the FIFF Campus in Namur, Belgium.

On 11 December 2018 his second film, After Tomorrow (Après-Demain), was broadcast on France 2 in France and then on RTBF in Belgium and RTS in Switzerland. Commissioned by French Public Service Television (France 2), it was meant to accompany the first TV broadcast of Tomorrow. The intention of this 71-minute documentary was to meet people who implemented projects after seeing the documentary Tomorrow. As in his book "Petit Manuel de Résistance Contemporaine", he develops the thesis that stories play a preponderant role in the evolution of society. "This is the conclusion of After Tomorrow: things change when there are enough people who tell a new story and engage in a non-violent street fight, such as civil rights or women's rights".

On 21 May 2019 he created with the guitarist and composer Sébastien Hoog, the show Résistances Poétiques at the Maison de la Poésie in Paris, which mixes poetry and music. A tour organised by Décibels Productions was planned for 2021. For Cyril Dion :

"Faced with the prospect of an ecological collapse, immersed in the digital age, caught up in the whirlwind of information, confronted with violence and inequality, we need poetry, beauty and music. Reading and writing poetry is already resistance to a world obsessed with financial return, performance and consumerism. It means taking the time to listen to the din inside us and to tap into our creative, spiritual resources to cope. And trying to build another future."

In September 2019, he begins shooting his third film, Animal, distributed by UGC. The film features two teenagers, Bella Lack and Vipulan Puvaneswaran, who belong to a generation convinced that their future and that of much of the Living World is threatened. The film will be released in France and Switzerland on December 1, 2021, and in Belgium on December 8. Animal was selected for the Cannes Film Festival 2021, in the Cinema for Climate section, won ten awards at international festivals and was nominated for the César for Best Documentary Film 2022. Released against the backdrop of a very difficult Covid season for French cinema, with attendance down by 30% to 40%, the film attracted 214,648 admissions, more than many dramas released over the same period. This is the second-best score of the year for a documentary, behind La Panthère des neiges.

In November 2022, a three-part climate documentary entitled Rebirth (Un monde nouveau in French) is broadcast on the French-German platform and TV network Arte. Cyril Dion wrote and stars in all three parts, directed by Thierry Robert. These films were conceived by Cyril Dion as a kind of plan to respond to the climate peril. The films were well received by critics, and distributed in many countries.

== Climate activism ==
In 2007, he founded with a few friends, the ecological movement Colibris (hummingbird in French). He was director until July 2013. In 2010, he was advisor and co-producer with Colibris of the movie Think global act Local by Coline Serreau. In 2012, he co-founded Kaizen magazine, and was editor in chief from March 2012 to April 2014. He is also Editor in Chief of the Domaine du Possible (The field of possibilities) collection of the French publisher Actes Sud with Jean-Paul Capitani.

He is one of the leading figures in the French climate movement that organised climate marches starting in September 2018. He spoke at the March on 13 October calling for the movement to be amplified and given a strategy. On 4 December, he called on the yellow jacket movement to join the climate marches, considering that :

"If we lose this battle, there will be no more purchasing power to defend or democracy to protect. There will only be wars, shortages and an unliveable planet. The good news is that the reason the planet is devastated is the same reason that causes relocations, modern slavery in factories, which leads the rich to become richer and the rest of the population to become poorer: an economic system whose obsession is profit, in the short term, at any price, and which concentrates wealth in a few hands. »

On 18 December 2018, he took part in the action L'Affaire du Siècle, launched by four NGOs (Greenpeace, Oxfam France, la Fondation Nicolas Hulot and Notre affaire à tous). Their common goal: take the French State to court for not acting on climate change. In a few days online mobilization beats all the petition records in France and gather 2,17 million signatories.

In January 2019, he is part of the Citizens' Vests collective which calls for the creation of a "citizens' assembly" drawn by lot and operating according to the principles of deliberative democracy to get out "from above" of the Yellow Vests crisis. On 13 February, he met with Emmanuel Macron and actress Marion Cotillard and proposed to the president to set up such an assembly to seek solutions on the citizens' initiative referendum, ecological transition and fiscal justice. On 13 April 2019, he explains in an interview with Le Monde why he believes that only collective intelligence can provide solutions to a problem as complex as the climate crisis. In it, he is critical of the great national debate organized by the government and believes that :

"If we want to achieve results that are shared by all, we need to redistribute power, and to build this complementarity between representative democracy and direct democracy. With this Citizens' Assembly, it is not a question of making a move, as was the case with the great debate, but of demonstrating that we can integrate these mechanisms into our democracies on a permanent basis."

The Convention gives rise to 149 measures. Emmanuel Macron announces 146 on 29 June, announces a referundum on Article 1 of the Constitution and the examination of a major law taking up these proposals in fall.

== Awards ==
Won

- TOMORROW
  - Salamandre d'or at the Festival du film de Sarlat 2015
  - César du meilleur film documentaire 2016
  - Best documentary Festival COLCOA 2016
  - Best documentary at festival Ram Dam of Tournai 2016
  - Prize Saint-Just of Narbonne 2016
- ANIMAL
  - Festival international du film de Valladolid 2021 : Espigua Verde, best documentary about climate
  - Festival international du film francophone de Namur 2021 : Junior Jury Prize
  - Festival Cinemambiente de Turin 2021 : Audience award
  - Another Way Film Festival à Madrid 2021 : Special Jury Mention
  - Festival du film de Sarlat 2021 : Junior Jury Prize
  - Trento Film Festival 2022 : Green film award
  - Green Film Festival de Cracovie 2022 : Grand Prize
  - European Film Awards 2022 : Young audience award
  - Festival Castellinaria 2022 : Environment and quality of life award
  - Deauville Green Awards 2023 : Silver Biodiversity Preservation Trophy

OTHER

- Prix Saint-Just de Narbonne 2016
- Docteur Honoris Causa of the Namur University (4 October 2016)
- Blue Planet Award Nausicaa 2017 - Novel category for Demain et après...
- Mediterranean Award (Prix Méditerranée) 2018 for 1st novel Imago.

Nominated

- Prix Lumière 2016: Best documentary award
- Stanislas 2017 Award : best first novel
- Style Award 2017
- Première plume 2017 Award
- Golden Eye (Oeil d'or) 2021 pour Animal
- César du meilleur film documentaire 2022 for Animal

== Filmography ==
- Tomorrow (Demain), co-directed with Mélanie Laurent, produce by Move Movie, released 2 December 2015
- After tomorrow, documentary co-directed with Laure Noualhat, 2018
- Animal, a movie in which Dion travels with two young environmental activists around the world, to discover the complexity of the obstacles to a real transition and the beauty of the endangered biodiversity, 2022.

== Bibliography ==
Poetry

- Assis sur le fil, éditions La Table Ronde, 2014
- À l'orée du danger, 2022, Éditions Actes Sud
- Résistances Poétiques, Éditions Actes Sud, 2023, ISBN 978-2330171193
- La Nuit est une page blanche, avec Stéphane Guiran et Katarzyna Kot, Éditions les heures brèves, 2023 (ISBN 978-2-9563748-8-6)
- La Route sans fin, Editions Castor Astral 2024, ISBN 979-1027803774

Essays

- Tomorrow: All Over the Globe, Solutions Already Exist, Chelsea Green publishing and Actes Sud publishing, 2017 (ISBN 978-2-330-07909-3).
- Petit manuel de résistance contemporaine : Récits et stratégies pour transformer le monde, Éditions Actes Sud, coll. « Domaine du possible », mai 2018 (ISBN 978-2-330-10144-2)
- Animal, Éditions Actes Sud, coll. « Domaine du possible », 2021 (ISBN 978-2-330-14687-0)

Novel

- Imago, Editions Actes Sud, Domaine français, 2017 (ISBN 978-2-330-08174-4)

Children's books

- Demain, les aventures de Léo, Lou et Pablo à la recherche d'un monde meilleur (with Mélanie Laurent), éd. Actes Sud Junior / L'amandier, 2015
- Demain entre tes mains, (avec Pierre Rabhi), éditions Actes Sud Junior, 2017
- Vous êtes des animaux, comme nous, 2021 (ISBN 978-2-330-15781-4), Éditions Actes Sud Junior (with Sébastien Mourrain)

Other

- Foreword to the French edition of George Marshall's Don't Even Think About It: Why Our Brains Are Wired to Ignore Climate Change (Actes Sud, 2017).
- Foreword to the French edition of Paul Hawken's Drawdown (Actes Sud, 2018)
