= Black Spot (TV series) =

French-Belgian supernatural thriller television series

- French: Zone Blanche
- Genre: Crime drama; Thriller; Procedural drama; Horror
- Created by: Mathieu Missoffe
- Written by: Mathieu Missoffe; Antonin Martin-Hilbert; Florent Meyer
- Directed by: Thierry Poiraud; Julien Despaux
- Starring: Suliane Brahim; Hubert Delattre; Laurent Capelluto
- Composers: Thomas Couzinier; Frédéric Kooshmanian
- Countries of origin: France; Belgium
- Original language: French
- No. of series: 2
- No. of episodes: 16

Production
- Running time: 52 minutes

Original release
- Network: France 2
- Release: 10 April 2017 – 25 February 2019

Black Spot (French: Zone Blanche, lit. 'White Zone') (Note: While the original French series title is Zone Blanche, which literally translates to English as "white zone", "white area", or "white region", the expression refers to a "dead zone," which describes the cellular dead zone of the setting.) is a French-Belgian television supernatural thriller that premiered on France 2 on 10 April 2017, following its debut in February at the 2017 Festival des créations télévisuelles de Luchon. Created by Mathieu Missoffe via co-production of Ego Productions, Be-Films, and RTBF, the series stars Suliane Brahim, Hubert Delattre, and Laurent Capelluto.

In November 2017, Amazon Prime acquired the rights to stream Season 1 globally outside of Denmark, Belgium, the Netherlands and Luxembourg — a first for any French series. A second season was commissioned by France 2 and aired in February 2021. It was released internationally by Netflix on 14 June that year.

== Plot ==
Police-Major Laurène Weiss is the head of the Gendarmerie (police) of her hometown of Villefranche, a small, isolated, fictional town surrounded by a 50,000-acre (200 km^{2}; 78 sq mi) forest in the mountains. Prosecutor Franck Siriani arrives to learn why the town's murder rate is six times the national average; he also has an interest in investigating the major's clouded past. The forest is a strange and exceptionally dangerous place, in which many of the murders take place.

== Cast ==
- Suliane Brahim: Laurène Weiss, the major of the gendarmes in Villefranche
- Hubert Delattre: Martial Ferrandis (aka Nounours / Baloo / Teddy Bear), a gendarme
- Laurent Capelluto: Franck Siriani, a once-disgraced prosecutor now serving as the District Attorney of Villefranche
- Samuel Jouy: Bertrand Steiner, the mayor of Villefranche
- Renaud Rutten: Louis Hermann, a gendarme
- Tiphaine Daviot: Camille Laugier (season 1-2), a gendarme-in-training
- Anne Suarez: Léa Steiner, Bertrand’s wife
- Naidra Ayadi: Leila Barami
- Camille Aguilar: Cora Weiss, Laurène’s daughter
- Brigitte Sy: Sabine Hennequin, the matron of the El Dorado bar
- Dan Herzberg: Gaspard Bellan, chief henchman of the Steiner family
- Cyrielle Debreuil: Anna Delambre
- Thomas Doret: Rudy Guerin, Cora’s friend
- Olivier Bonjour: Gerald Steiner (season 1-2), Bertrand’s father and the owner of most of the property in Villefranche
- Théo Costa-Marini: Roman Barthélémy, a member of the Children of Arduinna
- Samir Boitard: Paul Méric
- Jean-Michel Balthazar: Maître Caubere
- Pascal Elso: Pierre Winkler (Season 1)
- Serge Riaboukine (Season 2)
- Marina Hands: Delphine Garnier (season 2)
- Guinea pig - Peanut.

== Episodes ==
Series	Episodes	Originally released	
Series	Episodes	First released	Last released
1	8	10 April 2017	1 May 2017
2	8	14 June 2019	14 June 2019

=== Series 1 (2017) ===
No. overall	No. in series	Title	Directed by	Written by	Original release date	France viewers (millions)
1	1	"Quand on arrive en ville" "Stranger Comes to Town"	Thierry Poiraud & Julien Despaux	Mathieu Missoffe	10 April 2017	3.97
The corpse of a young woman is found hanging in the forest. Major Laurène Weiss tries to solve this mystery while welcoming the eccentric new prosecutor, Franck Siriani, to Villefranche. The townspeople are already tense from the announced closure of the local sawmill and the disappearance of the mayor's daughter.
2	2	"À Quoi Rêvent Les Loups?" "A Wolf's Dream"	Thierry Poiraud & Julien Despaux	Mathieu Missoffe	10 April 2017	3.97
Laurène comes across a wolf protecting a hidden newborn. She tries to find the child's parents, while being followed by the mysterious animal. As events quickly escalate, her past memories return.
3	3	"En abyme" "The Void"	Thierry Poiraud & Julien Despaux	Mathieu Missoffe	17 April 2017	2.97
A traumatised amateur speleologist resurfaces from a labyrinth of caves, claiming to have been separated from a companion while underground. Laurène tries to distinguish truth from lies in his testimony before considering a perilous descent. Meanwhile, a mysterious graffito appearing around Villefranche leads Cora to suspect a group of shadowy activists has kidnapped the mayor's missing daughter.
4	4	"Nous n'irons plus au bois" "No More Walks in The Woods"	Thierry Poiraud & Julien Despaux	Florent Meyer, Antonin Martin-Hilbert, & Mathieu Missoffe	17 April 2017	2.97
A phone is found with videos showing a group of young people terrified by a macabre discovery in the forest. After finding one of their corpses, Laurène and her team investigate to determine what happened during their night out. Meanwhile, she reflects on her complicated relationship with Bertrand, the town's mayor.
5	5	"Le bout de la route" "The End of the Road"	Thierry Poiraud & Julien Despaux	Mathieu Missoffe, Florent Meyer, & Antonin Martin-Hilbert	24 April 2017	2.97
A gang of thieves hit Sabine's bar. With the town on lockdown, Laurène must locate them to learn their purpose in Villefranche. Meanwhile, Cora and the children at Arduinna follow mysterious trucks roaming the forest at night.
6	6	"Sombres héros" "Dark Heroes"	Thierry Poiraud & Julien Despaux	Mathieu Missoffe, Florent Meyer, & Antonin Martin-Hilbert	24 April 2017	2.97
A woman commits suicide the same day that her husband is awarded a medal of honor. Laurène suspects the man is not the hero that everyone thinks he is. She tries to discover his dark secrets, but he is protected by the mayor, his childhood friend.
7	7	"Le secret derrière la fenêtre" "The Secret Behind the Window"	Thierry Poiraud & Julien Despaux	Florent Meyer, Antonin Martin-Hilbert, & Mathieu Missoffe	1 May 2017	3.25
The father of a mentally-handicapped teenager is found dead. The townspeople are concerned about the boy and want to know what happened. Laurène begins a difficult murder investigation, but is troubled because Siriani has put Bertrand in custody. Laurène must uncover the truth.
8	8	"La fin n'est que le commencement" "The End Is Only the Beginning"	Thierry Poiraud & Julien Despaux	Mathieu Missoffe	1 May 2017	3.25
The investigation into the disappearance of the mayor's daughter rebounds with the strangely staged discovery of her body. While Bertrand seeks revenge, Laurène finally gets closer to the hidden enemy that she has been tracking for years.

=== Series 2 ===
No. overall	No. in series	Title	Directed by	Written by	Original release date	France viewers (millions)
9	1	"Comment Nous Vivons Maintenant (part 1)" "How We Live Now (Part 1)"	Thierry Poiraud	Mathieu Missoffe & Antonin Martin-Hilbert	14 June 2019	N/A
While Major Laurène Weiss is recovering and some believe she has returned from the dead, the murder of a Steiner driver puts Villefranche under tension. Everything points towards the environmental activists of the Children of Arduinna and, to calm the spirits, Laurène has no choice but to try to find them. But the discovery of a 2,000-year-old skull pushes her to look elsewhere.
10	2	"Comment Nous Vivons Maintenant (part 2)" "How We Live Now (Part 2)"	Thierry Poiraud	Mathieu Missoffe & Antonin Martin-Hilbert	14 June 2019	N/A
The death of a second driver launches Laurène on the tracks of an ancient treasure sought by the victims. Following the trail of Celtic rites practised in the region 2,000 years ago, she comes to wonder if this affair would not be linked to her own kidnapping. Meanwhile, prosecutor Siriani is quick to pressure Cora to press charges against Gerald Steiner.
11	3	"Dans une Autre Vie" "In Another Life"	Thierry Poiraud	Florent Meyer	14 June 2019	N/A
The inhabitants of Villefranche are the target of deadly bee attacks. With the help of Delphine Garnier, a specialist in environmental disturbances dispatched by the Department, Laurène discovers a wild hive formed around ... the corpse of a man. At the same time, she secretly questions a breeder who has been in contact with the mysterious individual she has been looking for years. He tells her that this creature would be none other than ... Cernunnos, the Horned god.
12	4	"Coup de Lune" "Moonstruck"	Thierry Poiraud	Juliette Soubrier	14 June 2019	N/A
The moon is full and, as every year in the fall, Villefranche is preparing for the worst. As tension mounts, a harassed young woman leads the brigade to revisit an old case involving Hermann. Madness seizes the city and even resurfaces a ghost.
13	5	"La Jeune Fille et le Mort" "The Maiden and the Corpse"	Julien Despaux	Sylvie Chanteux & Mathieu Missoffe	14 June 2019	N/A
A young man is found dead in the middle of the forest in front of a mysterious moss-covered piano. Laurène investigates around his fiancée, a blind virtuoso, and leaves on the track of a merciless night hunter… At the same time, Cora discovers who is the real chief of the Children of Arduinna and Siriani's past resurfaces.
14	6	"Sanctuaire" "Sanctuary"	Julien Despaux	Florent Meyer & Mathieu Missoffe	14 June 2019	N/A
After the Cernunnos attack, Laurène and Nounours find themselves stranded at the bottom of a ravine in the heart of the forest. It is in fact, a Celtic sanctuary which is none other than the place where Laurène was kidnapped and imprisoned when she was 18. As they desperately try to get out, Laurène is overwhelmed by the memories of her past captivity. For his part, Siriani is surprised at the sudden disappearance of Delphine.
15	7	"Comme un Chien" "Like a Dog"	Julien Despaux	Antonin Martin-Hilbert	14 June 2019	N/A
Now certain of the threat that Cernunnos represents for Villefranche, Laurène tries to convince her hierarchy to send her reinforcements. Especially since they are approaching Samonios, the day when, among the Celts, the Deer God hunts with his dogs ... At the same time, hounds out of nowhere arrive in town and start to attack ...
16	8	"La Proie et les Ombres" "The Shadow and the Preys"	Julien Despaux	Mathieu Missoffe	14 June 2019	N/A
Laurène makes a pact with Bertrand and his men in an attempt to flush out Cernunnos. The hunt is launched deep in the forest. Gérald intends to take the opportunity to settle his accounts with his son, unless Siriani can bring him down before. Cora and the Children of Arduinna are on the verge of destroying the Steiners.
