= Fredrika Stahl =

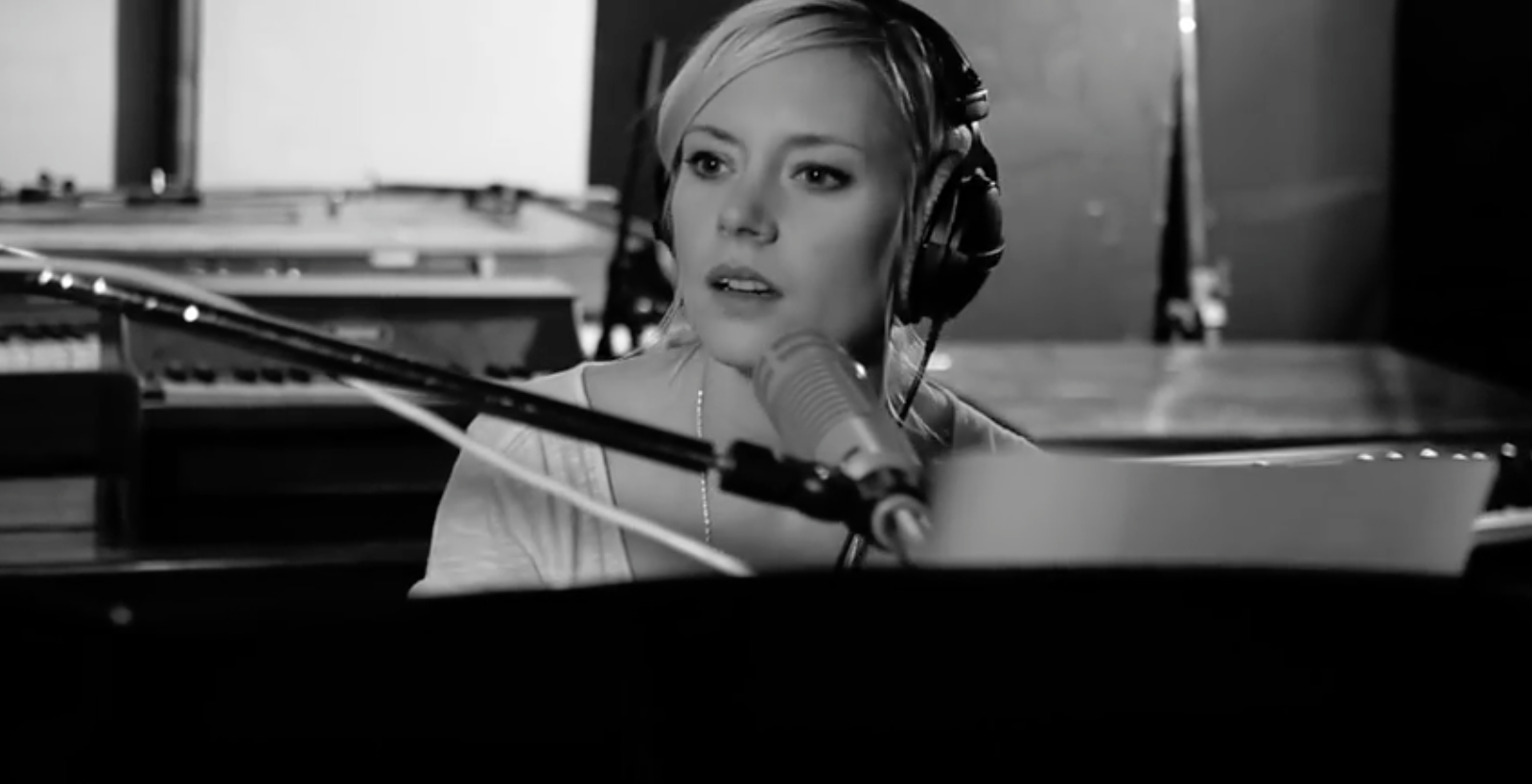

Background information
- Born: 24 October 1984 (age 41)
- Origin: Stockholm, Sweden
- Genres: Jazz, pop
- Occupations: Singer, songwriter
- Instruments: Vocals, piano, guitar
- Years active: 2005–present
- Labels: Sony BMG, Epic
- Website: fredrikastahl.com

Fredrika Stahl (born 24 October 1984) is a Swedish singer and songwriter signed to Sony Music in France. Her style is a mix of jazz and pop. Along with singing, Fredrika plays the piano and guitar.

Her debut album, A Fraction of You was released in 2006. It features musicians such as Tom McClung (piano, also arrangements), José Palmer (guitar), Diego Imbert (Double Bass) and Karl Jannuska (drums). Stahl wrote the lyrics and music on her debut album.

Her second album, Tributaries, features Hiro Morozumi on piano, Oyvind Nypan & Andreas Öberg on guitar, Pierre Boussaguet & Acelio de Paula on bass and Simoné Prattico on drums as well as a large array of Parisian horn and string musicians.

Her song "Twinkle Twinkle" was used in a Nissan Juke commercial in 2010.

== Discography ==
- A Fraction of You (2006)
- Tributaries (2008)
- Sweep Me Away (2010)
- Off to Dance (2013)
- Tomorrow (Demain) original soundtrack (2015)
- Natten (2021)
- Small Body (Piccolo corpo) original soundtrack (2021)
