= The Velvet Queen =

2021 French-language documentary film

- Poster for The Velvet Queen
- French: La Panthère des neiges
- Directed by: Marie Amiguet; Vincent Munier
- Written by: Marie Amiguet; Vincent Munier; Sylvain Tesson
- Produced by: Pierre-Emmanuel Fleurantin
- Music by: Nick Cave; Warren Ellis
- Distributed by: Oscilloscope Laboratories
- Release dates: 13 July 2021 (Cannes); 15 December 2021 (France); 22 December 2021 (USA)
- Running time: 92 minutes
- Country: France
- Language: French
- Box office: $5.6 million

The Velvet Queen (French: La Panthère des neiges, lit. 'The Snow Panther') is a 2021 French-language documentary film. It follows Sylvain Tesson and Vincent Munier as they attempt to find a snow leopard in Tibet. The film was directed by Marie Amiguet and Munier in their feature-length debut, and premiered in the Cinema for the Climate section at the 74th Cannes Film Festival on 13 July 2021, with a wider theatrical release in France on 15 December and a limited release in the United States on 22 December. It won Best Documentary Film at the 47th César Awards, and Best Documentary at the 27th Lumière Awards.

== Synopsis ==
"In the heart of the Tibetan highlands, multi-award-winning nature photographer Vincent Munier guides writer Sylvain Tesson on his quest to document the infamously elusive snow leopard. Munier introduces Tesson to the subtle art of waiting from a blind spot, tracking animals, and finding the patience to catch sight of the beasts. Through their journey in the Tibetan peaks, inhabited by invisible presences, the two men ponder humankind's place amongst the magnificent creatures and glorious landscapes they encounter along the way".

== Release ==
The film had its world premiere in the Cinema for the Climate section at the 74th Cannes Film Festival on 13 July 2021. It had a wider theatrical release in France on 15 December and a limited release in USA by Oscilloscope Pictures on 22 December. It was released on VOD by Oscilloscope Video on 24 January 2023.

== Reception ==
=== Box office ===
The Velvet Queen grossed $151,006 in North America, and $5.6 million in other territories.

=== Critical response ===
On Rotten Tomatoes, the film has an approval rating of 100% based on 46 reviews and an average rating of 8/10. The site's critical consensus reads, "Its narration might not be distracting for some, but The Velvet Queen more than makes up for it with some truly striking cinematography." Metacritic, which uses a weighted average, assigned a score of 78 out of 100 based on 10 critics, indicating "generally favourable reviews".

Brian Tallerico of RogerEbert.com described the film as "a calming, meditative experience." Paul Byrnes of The Sydney Morning Herald rated the film 4 out of 5 stars, calling it "transcendently beautiful." Peter Bradshaw of The Guardian also rated the film 4 out of 5, stating that "the film has a real writer whose style rises above the cliche into which nature documentary almost always descends."

=== Accolades ===
Accolades received by The Adam Project
Award	Date of ceremony	Category	Recipient(s)	Result	Ref.
Lumière Awards	17 January 2022	Best Documentary	The Velvet Queen	Won	
César Awards	25 February 2022	Best Documentary Film	The Velvet Queen	Won	
César Awards	25 February 2022	Best Original Music	Nick Cave and Warren Ellis	Nominated	
César Awards	25 February 2022	Best First Feature Film	The Velvet Queen	Nominated	

== Soundtrack ==
La Panthère Des Neiges (Original Soundtrack)

Film score by Nick Cave and Warren Ellis
- Released: 17 December 2021
- Genre: Film score
- Label: Lakeshore Records

The soundtrack for the film was created by Nick Cave and Warren Ellis, and released on 17 December 2021 by Lakeshore Records. Siobhán Kane of The Irish Times rated the soundtrack 4 out of 5 stars, calling it "naturally wonderful". Lucy Harbron of Clash rated it 7/10, commenting that the soundtrack "feels like an essential part of the Nick Cave and Warren Ellis discography."

No.	Title	Length
1.	"L'attaque des Loups"	3:23
2.	"Les Cerfs"	5:02
3.	"Antilope"	2:33
4.	"La Bête"	1:21
5.	"Les Yaks"	2:26
6.	"Des Affûts Elliptiques"	3:07
7.	"Les Nomades"	1:21
8.	"La Grotte"	3:19
9.	"Les Princes"	3:02
10.	"La Neige Tombe"	1:53
11.	"Les Ours"	4:37
12.	"Un Être Vous Obsède"	2:54
13.	"L'apparition (English: We Are Not Alone)"	9:40
Total length:		44:38
