= Tomorrow (2015 film) =

- Theatrical release poster
- Directed by: Cyril Dion; Mélanie Laurent
- Written by: Cyril Dion
- Produced by: Bruno Levy
- Cinematography: Alexandre Léglise
- Edited by: Sandie Bompar
- Music by: Fredrika Stahl
- Production companies: Move Movie; Mars Films; Mely Productions; France 2 Cinéma
- Distributed by: Mars Distribution
- Release dates: 11 November 2015 (Sarlat Film Festival); 2 December 2015 (France)
- Running time: 118 minutes
- Country: France
- Language: French
- Box office: $11.3 million

Tomorrow (French: Demain) is a 2015 French documentary film directed by Cyril Dion and Mélanie Laurent. Faced with a future that scientists say is a great cause for concern, the film has the distinction of not giving in to catastrophism. Optimistically, it identifies initiatives that have been proven themselves in ten countries as examples of solutions to environmental and social challenges of the twenty-first century in agriculture, energy, economy, education and governance.

Tomorrow exceeded a million entries in France. It won the 2016 César Award for Best Documentary Film and was distributed in 27 countries.

== Description ==
The film is organised in five chapters:

- Agriculture
- Energy
- Economy
- Democracy
- Education

== Production ==
=== Funding ===
Tomorrow's production team fell short in funding. On 27 May 2014, the team launched crowdfunding activities on the internet platform KissKissBankBank with the objective of gathering 200,000 Euro to finance the film and fund the rental of shooting equipment. Two months later on 26 July the team had raised 444,390 Euro, more than a quarter of the budget of the film, with the help of 10,266 contributors.

=== Contributors ===
Initiatives taking place in France (including Réunion), Finland, Denmark, Belgium, India, the United Kingdom, the United States, Switzerland, Sweden and Iceland are shown. People appearing in the film include:

- Cyril Dion (director)
- Mélanie Laurent (director)
- Pierre Rabhi (writer and environmental activist)
- Vandana Shiva (writer and environmental activist)
- Jeremy Rifkin (foresighter)
- Anthony Barnosky (University of California, Berkeley)
- Elizabeth Hadly (Stanford University)
- Éric Scotto (head of Akuo Energy, renewable energy producer)
- Olivier De Schutter (United Nations Special Rapporteur)
- Emmanuel Druon (Pocheco)
- Jan Gehl (architect and urban planner)
- Nick Green (Incredible Farm)
- Mary Clear (Incredible Edible, Todmorden)
- Perrine et Charles Hervé-Gruyer (organic farmers)
- Rob Hopkins (Transition Towns and Totnes pound)
- Bernard Lietaer (economist)
- Michelle Long (Business Alliance for Local Living Economies)
- Kari Louhivuori (Kirkkojärvi Comprehensive School of Espoo)
- Elango Rangaswamy (model village of Kuthambakkam, India)
- Robert Reed (Recology)
- Thierry Salomon (negawatt power)
- David Van Reybrouck
- Malik Yakini (Detroit Black Community Food Security Network)
- Hervé Dubois (WIR Bank)

== Analysis ==
Unlike other documentary films that focus on the cause of global environmental imbalances and their negative consequences (such as Le syndrome du Titanic, The Eleventh Hour, An Inconvenient Truth, That Should Not Be: Our Children Will Accuse Us and Home), Tomorrow offers a constructive approach (similar to Solutions locales pour un désordre global) putting forward solutions to environmental problems facing mankind.

== Accolades ==
Award / Film Festival	Category	Recipients and nominees	Result
César Awards	Best Documentary Film		Won
Lumière Awards	Best Documentary		Nominated
COLCOA French Film Festival	Best Documentary		Won

== Impact ==
The film was shown at COP 21, European Parliament, UN and at every school in Brussels by the Brussels Minister of the Environment. More than 700 projects related to the initiatives described in the film were launched in late 2016. The film has attracted a passion for alternative forms of consumption and participation in the society it presents. The co-director Cyril Dion has since been using the film's success to support the mouvement Colibris (Hummingbird movement), a group looking forward to change modern lifestyle, e.g. during the French presidential campaign of 2017.

== See also ==
- List of environmental films
