= Our Body (2023 film) =

2023 documentary film

- Directed by: Claire Simon
- Produced by: Kristina Larsen
- Cinematography: Claire Simon
- Edited by: Luc Forveille
- Production company: Madison Films
- Release date: 17 February 2023 (Berlinale)
- Running time: 168 minutes
- Country: France
- Languages: French; Spanish; English

Our Body (French: Notre Corps) is a 2023 documentary film about patients in the gynecology ward of a hospital in the 20th arrondissement of Paris. It was directed by Claire Simon.

The film premiered on 17 February 2023 as a part of the Forum section at the 73rd Berlin International Film Festival.

== Reception ==
=== Critical reception ===
On the review aggregator website Rotten Tomatoes, 100% of 25 critics' reviews are positive, with an average rating of 7.9/10. The website's consensus reads: "Our Body explores the doctor/patient relationship from a women's perspective, adding up to an intimate and illuminating look at modern healthcare." Metacritic, which uses a weighted average, assigned the film a score of 93 out of 100, based on 11 critics, indicating "universal acclaim".

In June 2025, IndieWire ranked the film at number 44 on its list of "The 100 Best Movies of the 2020s (So Far)."

=== Accolades ===
Award	Date	Category	Recipient	Result	Ref.
Berlin International Film Festival	26 February 2023	Berlinale Documentary Film Award	Our Body	Nominated	
Berlin International Film Festival	26 February 2023	Caligari Film Award	Our Body	Nominated	
Valladolid International Film Festival	28 October 2023	Tiempo de Historia Award	Our Body	Nominated	
Gotham Independent Film Awards	27 November 2023	Best Documentary Feature	Our Body	Nominated	
Louis Delluc Prize	6 December 2023	Best Film	Our Body	Nominated	
IndieWire Critics Poll	11 December 2023	Best Documentary	Our Body	6th Place	
Cinema Eye Honors	12 January 2024	Outstanding Direction	Claire Simon	Nominated	
César Awards	23 February 2024	Best Documentary Film	Kristina Larsen, Claire Simon	Nominated	
Cinema for Peace awards	2024	Dove on Global Health	Our Body	Nominated	
