= World Congress of Imams and Rabbis for Peace =

The World Congress of Imams and Rabbis for Peace "brings together Imams and Rabbis who formally seek to initiate rapprochement between Judaism and Islam".

Three congresses have been held, in Brussels, January 2005; Seville, March 2006; and Paris, December 2008. These gatherings were attended by religious leaders, from over 43 countries, who are actively committed to the path of dialogue between their communities." WCIRP is a project of Hommes de Parole, a Swiss foundation based in Geneva, created in 2001, by Alain Michel.

== First World Congress of Imams and Rabbis for peace: 2005 ==
The First World Congress of Imams and Rabbis for peace took place in Brussels, Belgium from 6 January 2005. One hundred and fifty Rabbis and Imams participated. The focus of the conference was: "Islam and Judaism as instruments of peace - recognition and respect of others". The program was intended to be a forum for planning concrete actions and setting up of frameworks for cooperation. The goals of the meeting included 1) condemning violence perpetrated in the name of religion 2) creation of a dialog and partnership between the two religions 3) facilitate development of peaceful solutions to conflict by influential religious leaders 4) gather these leaders before the media to promote a message of peace. A final declaration, posted on the Hommes de Parole Web site was made as follows:

We, leaders, representatives, Rabbis and Imams of Muslim and Jewish religious communities who have assembled from all over the world for the first world congress of Imams and Rabbis for Peace affirm our commitment to strive to end all bloodshed and attacks against innocent human beings that offend the right to life and dignity given by the Almighty to all human beings.

1. We call upon all people to combat hate, ignorance and their causes and to build together a world of peace, rich in diversity, in which all faiths and their practices are respected and protected.
2. We call upon the political leaders of all peoples to work for righteous and peaceful durable solutions around the world and in particular in the Holy Land for the benefit of all peoples and faith-communities who live in the land and hold it dear.
3. We pledge ourselves to pursue a shared goal of respect for human rights for all people and peoples, without which no peace can be possible.
4. We call upon all religious leaders in Jewish and Muslim congregations around the world to devote regular sermons and addresses to their communities on the importance of inter-religious respect and reverence for all human life under all circumstances.
5. We announce the establishment of a permanent joint committee to help implement these commitments and propose programmatic initiatives on a regular basis, in keeping with the proposals presented during the congress and in its spirit for the well being of all peoples.

== Second World Congress of Imams and Rabbis for peace: 2006 ==
The Second World Congress of Imams and Rabbis for peace took place in Seville, Spain from 19 to 22 March 2006. The Second Congress focused on building trust and confidence necessary for joint projects, creating a forum in which religious leaders can use their influence in conflict resolution, help religious leaders to challenge the misuse of religion in fanaticism, and to create structures to facilitate practical day-to-day work in prioritized areas. A final declaration, posted on the Hommes de Parole Web site, was made as follows:

In the name of the One Creator and Master of the Universe, the Compassionate and All Merciful, we Muslim and Jewish leaders and representatives, gathered for the Second World Congress of Imams and Rabbis for Peace organized by Hommes de Parole in Seville, in the region of Andalusia - recalling the past era in which Jews and Muslims lived together here in harmony and mutual enrichment - and aspiring for such relations today and in the future.

- We accordingly affirm that contrary to widespread misrepresentation, there is no inherent conflict between Islam and Judaism, on the contrary. While modern politics has regrettably impacted negatively upon the relationship, our two religions share the most fundamental values of faith in the One Almighty whose name is Peace, who is merciful, compassionate and just; and who calls on us human beings to manifest these values in our lives and to advance them in relation to all persons whose lives and dignity are sacred. Therefore we reiterate the message we sent from our first congress, that we deplore bloodshed or violence in the name of any ideology everywhere. Especially when such is perpetrated in the name of religion it is a desecration of religion, itself and the gravest offense against the Holy Name of the Creator.
- Thus, in addition to calling upon all our co-religionists to respect all human life, dignity and rights, to promote peace and justice; we call upon them and the governments of the world and international institutions to show respect for the attachments and symbols of all religions, as well as their holy sites, houses of worship and cemeteries, particularly in the Holy Land, due to its special sensitivity.
- Accordingly, we condemn any negative representation of these, let alone any desecration, Heaven forbid. Similarly, we condemn any incitement against a faith or people, let alone any call for their elimination, and we urge authorities to do likewise.
- We recognize that there is widespread misrepresentation of our religions, - one in the other's community as well as in the world at large.
- We affirm therefore the urgent need for truthful and respectful education about each other's faith and tradition in our respective communities and schools; and call upon those responsible to promote such essential education for peaceful co-existence.
- Solemnly we pledge ourselves to the aforementioned continue to seek out one another to build bridges of respect, hope and friendship, to combat incitement and hostility, to overcome all barriers and obstacles, to reinforce mutual trust, serving the noble goal of universal peace especially in the land that is holy to us all.

== Third World Congress of Imams and Rabbis for peace: 15–17 December 2008, Paris, France ==
The Hommes de Parole Foundation has organized the Third World Congress of Imams and Rabbis for Peace at UNESCO, in Paris, under the patronage of and in collaboration with UNESCO. The theme of the Congress is "The Sacredness of Peace". The Congress brought together 85 religious leaders and experts from over 22 countries.

== Permanent Committee for Jewish-Muslim Dialogue ==
The Permanent Committee for Jewish-Muslim Dialogue was created after the First World Congress as an institution which would reflect and act in domains and on problematic issues in which Islam and Judaism are implicated. The committee is composed on nine founder members, four international Jewish personalities, four international Muslim personalities and a neutral president: Sheikh Ahmed Abaadi, Director of Islamic Affairs of Morocco; Grand Rabbi Joseph Azran; Grand Rabbi Av Beth-Din of Rishon LeZion; Grand Rabbi Shear Yashuv Cohen, Grand Rabbi of Haifa; Sheikh Kone Idriss Koudouss, President of the National council of Imams of the Ivory Coast; Alain Michel, founder of Hommes de Parole; Dr Ndam Njoya, Coordinator of the Higher Islamic Council of the Cameroon, President Founder of the Institute of Islamic and Religious Studies, International co-President of the World Conference of Religions for Peace; Grand Rabbi David Rosen, International Director of Interreligious Affairs of the American Jewish Committee, International co-President of the World conference of Religions for Peace; Sheikh Talal Sedir, ex-Minister of Religious Affairs of the Palestinian Authority and Imam of Hebron; Oded Wiener, Director of the Cabinet of the Grand Rabbinate of Israel.

== International Interreligious Monitoring Centre (IIMC) ==
The Committee created an International Interreligious Monitoring Centre (IIMC) in February 2005. The goal of this committee is to condemn and denounce anti-religious acts worldwide, to create a best practices guidelines and to address the bigotry prejudice and racism. The committee has also published two press releases condemning the assassination of Rafic Hariri and the threats made against the holy places of Jerusalem.

== See also ==
- List of peace activists
