= The Swarm (2020 film) =

2020 French fantasy drama film

- Film poster
- French: La Nuée
- Directed by: Just Philippot
- Screenplay by: Jérôme Genevray; Franck Victor
- Produced by: Manuel Chiche; Thierry Lounas
- Starring: Suliane Brahim; Sofian Khammes; Marie Narbonne; Raphael Romand; Nathalie Boyer
- Cinematography: Romain Carcanade
- Edited by: Pierre Deschamps
- Music by: Vincent Cahay
- Production companies: Capricci Films; The Jokers Films; Arte France Cinéma; Auvergne-Rhône-Alpes Cinéma
- Distributed by: Netflix
- Release dates: August 29, 2020 (Angoulême); August 6, 2021 (Netflix)
- Running time: 101 minutes
- Country: France
- Language: French

The Swarm (French: La Nuée) is a 2020 French horror drama film directed by Just Philippot from a screenplay by Jérôme Genevray and Franck Victor. The film stars Suliane Brahim, Sofian Khammes, Marie Narbonne, Raphael Romand and Nathalie Boyer.

The film was selected for the Critics' Week at the 2020 Cannes Film Festival (canceled due to COVID-19 pandemic).

== Plot ==
Virginie, a widow and single mother, lives in rural France with her two children, Laura and Gaston. She has been unsuccessfully raising locusts for protein, much to her disappointment and her daughter's embarrassment. The family used to raise goats when Virginie's husband, Nico, was still alive, but locusts are now the focus after his death, alluded to have been by suicide. Virginie struggles to make ends meet as the locusts are not reproducing at a large enough volume.

Gaston discovers that the locusts are interested in human flesh and blood after one of his own pet locusts feeds on a wound on his hand. Later on, Laura has an altercation with Kévin, a boy at her school, over videos posted online where he mocks her and her family. Frustrated by the fact that nobody is willing to pay good money for the locusts or only buy from her out of pity when her friend Karim asks them, Virginie goes to her locust enclosure and angrily trashes the nests, only to slip and be knocked out. Upon waking, Virginie discovers the locusts eating from wounds on her arm and she quickly flees the enclosure.

Overnight, the locusts become more active. Virginie notices this change and in a moment of desperation, she partially opens the enclosure, unbandages her arm and allows the locusts to feed from her.

The locusts continue to multiply at rapid rate, allowing Virginie to sell large quantities, however, she must continue to supply them with blood and flesh. Laura is frustrated by her mother's increasing obsession with the locusts, and in a fit of rage, tears open one of the greenhouses, which allows a swarm to escape. Gaston is in a truck nearby with his goat Huguette tied in the back. Attracted by the goat, the swarm attacks the truck and when they leave, Huguette is nowhere to be seen.

When Virginie returns from a trip to town, Gaston cries to her that Huguette was taken by the locusts. Virginie later finds out that Laura caused the tear in the greenhouse and berates her, after which she finds Huguette in a field, covered in locusts that are feeding on her. She doesn't tell Gaston that she has found his goat and drives him around while he calls out for Huguette.

Virginie's mental state continues to deteriorate as she supplies the locusts with her own blood, and she begins to kill nearby animals such as her neighbour's dog and cow to feed the locusts. Her relationship with Karim also suffers. She becomes distant as she cannot tell him why she has open wounds upon her body, and she refuses to remove her clothing when they begin to kiss in his winery.

Gaston is finally able to go to a soccer camp he has been wanting to go to, however, Laura is the one who has to drop him off as Virginie has been up all night feeding the locusts; Laura does not know this as her mother didn't allow her into her room. When Laura returns home, she finds her mother's room is open and the floor is covered in bloody clothing. She rushes to the greenhouses, only to find her mother in her undergarments and being fed upon by the locusts. Horrified, Laura contacts Karim over text and tells him to come over to her home because her mother is not well.

Karim tries to cheer the family up with a movie night at his home, however when he is alone in the kitchen with Laura, she is unable to tell him what's wrong with Virginie, but mentions the locusts. Virginie shows up and an argument ensues between her and Karim, and Karim says that Laura shouldn't go back home. Meanwhile, the neighbor goes into one of the greenhouses to look for his dog. Later that night, Karim returns Virginie and Laura home.

When he sees that Virginie and Laura have entered their home, he begins to look around the greenhouses, only to find the body of the neighbor who had been looking for his dog; the man has been killed by the locusts. Karim is also attacked by the locusts, but manages to escape the greenhouse. Virginie finds him outside and realises that he's discovered her secret. He runs back to his truck and takes out a tank of gasoline, dousing the greenhouses and lighting them on fire.

Virginie tries to stop him and put out the fire, but they notice that the locusts have escaped and begun to swarm, attacking the house in which Karim and Laura have hidden. Virginie hears Laura screaming and runs into the house, finding Karim covered and being eaten by locusts. Laura escapes from the house and runs into a nearby forest, followed by Virginie.

Laura is chased by the swarm and hides under an overturned boat on a lake. The swarm begin to cover the boat, the weight of them pushing it down and starting to drown Laura. Virginie sees this and cuts open her palms with a pocket knife, covering her face with her blood and beckoning the swarm towards her. The swarm attack Virginie, leaving Laura be. When Laura realises what has happened, she swims out from underneath the boat and swims towards her injured mother, taking her into her arms. Virginie clings to her daughter in the water as the swarm dissipates above them and dawn breaks.

== Cast ==
The cast include:

- Suliane Brahim as Virginie Hébrard
- Sofian Khammesas as Karim
- Marie Narbonne as Laura Hébrard
- Raphael Romand as Gaston Hébrard
- Nathalie Boyer as Kévin's mother
- Victor Bonnel as Kévin
- Vincent Deniard as Mr Briand
- Christian Bouillette as Duvivier

== Filming ==
The shooting took place in 2019 in Caubeyres, in Lot-et-Garonne for the scenes which feature Virginie's farm as well as the interior of its ground floor, and in the region Auvergne-Rhône-Alpes for the interior scenes of the first floor of Virginie's house as well as the other exterior scenes (cellar, forest, lake and vineyard). In Puy-de-Dôme, locations included the Lycée Virlogeux in Riom, the football stadium in Billom and the Lac des Fades at Saint-Jacques-d'Ambur.

== Release ==
Netflix bought the worldwide distribution rights to the film except China, Spain and France; it released on 6 August 2021.

== Reception ==
On review aggregator Rotten Tomatoes, 79% of 14 reviews are positive, with an average rating of 6.5/10.
