= Suliane Brahim =

French actress (born 1978)

- Born: 1 April 1978 (age 48); Chartres, France
- Education: École nationale supérieure des arts et techniques du théâtre
- Occupation: actress
- Years active: 1996–present
- Awards: Prix Suzanne Bianchetti

Suliane Brahim (born 1 April 1978) is a French actress. With a background in theatre, she has also performed in film and on television, most recently in a lead role in the series Zone Blanche (Black Spot).

== Biography ==
Brahim was born the eldest of three children in Chartres, France, to a father of Moroccan descent and a Breton mother. She was raised in Bourges. She studied the Swahili language at the Institut national des langues et civilisations orientales, planning on a humanitarian career, as well as theatre at École nationale supérieure des arts et techniques du théâtre.

In 1996, Brahim performed in her first play and continued into the next decade, becoming a boarder and, later, member of Comédie-Française. Her performances onstage include Peer Gynt, Dom Juan, Lucrezia Borgia and Romeo and Juliet, whilst she was also in the cast of the 2026 comedy film Comédie-Française.

Since 2013, Brahim has been in several films and television shows, leading to her being cast as Major Laurène Weiss in the France 2 thriller Zone Blanche in 2017 and Virginie in The Swarm (French: La Nuée) in 2020. She is also a recipient of the Prix Suzanne Bianchetti, given to the most promising young French actress.
