= As I Open My Eyes =

2015 film

- Film poster
- Directed by: Leyla Bouzid
- Written by: Leyla Bouzid; Marie-Sophie Chambon
- Produced by: Sandra da Fonseca
- Starring: Baya Medhaffer
- Cinematography: Sébastien Goepfert
- Edited by: Lilian Corbeille
- Music by: Khyam Allami
- Distributed by: Shellac
- Release dates: 5 September 2015 (Venice); 23 December 2015 (France); 13 January 2016 (Tunisia)
- Running time: 102 minutes
- Countries: France; Tunisia; Belgium; United Arab Emirates; Switzerland
- Languages: Tunisian Arabic; French
- Box office: $50,656

As I Open My Eyes (French: À peine j'ouvre les yeux) is a 2015 French-Tunisian drama film directed by Leyla Bouzid. It was screened in the Contemporary World Cinema section of the 2015 Toronto International Film Festival. Baya Medhaffar stars as a teenage rock singer. The film is Bouzid's first feature. It was selected as the Tunisian entry for the Best Foreign Language Film at the 89th Academy Awards. However, the film was not included on the final list of submissions published by the Academy.

== Plot ==
In Tunisia in the summer of 2010, 18-year-old Farah Kallel wraps up school exams and prepares to enter university. In the meantime, she has joined a band and is secretly dating the lute player, Borhène. Unbeknownst to Farah, her band is already being watched by the police, as their songs are critical of the current government. Farah's mother, Hayet (Ghalia Benali) receives a visit from an old friend, Moncef, who warns her of the police involvement and warns her to watch her daughter. However, the night of their first gig, Farah locks her mother in her room and escapes to sing at the gig. The performance goes well, giving Farah confidence to continue with her musical pursuits, despite Hayet wanting Farah to study medicine at university.

After several more gigs, Borhène arrives at a rehearsal having been interrogated and beaten by the police all night. He accuses Ali, the band's manager who has been taping all of their performances, of being a cop and informing on the band. Later, Ali approaches Farah and tells her he has been protecting her and tries to warn her further but she ignores him.

Going to a bus station, on the way to visit her father, Farah goes missing. Hayet tries everything to locate her but eventually realizes that Farah has been taken by the police. She goes to Borhène who tries to convince her that they should get publicity to force the police to release Farah, but she decides to go a different way, contacting Moncef who tells her where Farah is located.

In prison, Farah has been beaten and sexually assaulted. She is eventually released to her parents, but sinks into a deep depression, quitting her band. Hayet manages to help Farah find her voice again and sings with her in her room.

== Cast ==
- Baya Medhaffar as Farah
- Ghalia Benali as Hayet
- Montassar Ayari as Borhėne

== Reception ==
The film received positive reviews upon its release. It holds a 100% fresh ratings from Rotten Tomatoes and a 7.5 average rating. The critic for Variety called it an "impressive debut" and called Medhaffer's acting "a stand-out lead perf". A critic for Indiewire gave the film a score of A− and called it "the Best Fictional Film Yet About the Arab Spring." The Hollywood Reporter was less enthused about the film criticizing its "mostly familiar notes" but praising the cinematography and acting.

== Accolades ==
Award / Film Festival	Category	Recipients and nominees	Result
Quebec City Film Festival	Cinema Lovers Award		Won
Lumière Awards	Best Female Revelation	Baya Medhaffar	Nominated
Lumière Awards	Best French-Language Film		Nominated
Magritte Awards	Most Promising Actress	Ghalia Benali	Nominated
Magritte Awards	Best Foreign Film in Coproduction		Nominated
Venice International Film Festival	BNL People's Choice Award		Won
Venice International Film Festival	Europa Cinemas Label Award (Venice Days)		Won
Saint-Jean-de-Luz International Film Festival	Best Film, Best Actress, Audience Award		Won

== See also ==
- List of submissions to the 89th Academy Awards for Best Foreign Language Film
- List of Tunisian submissions for the Academy Award for Best Foreign Language Film
