= Vincent Munier =

French photographer and filmmaker

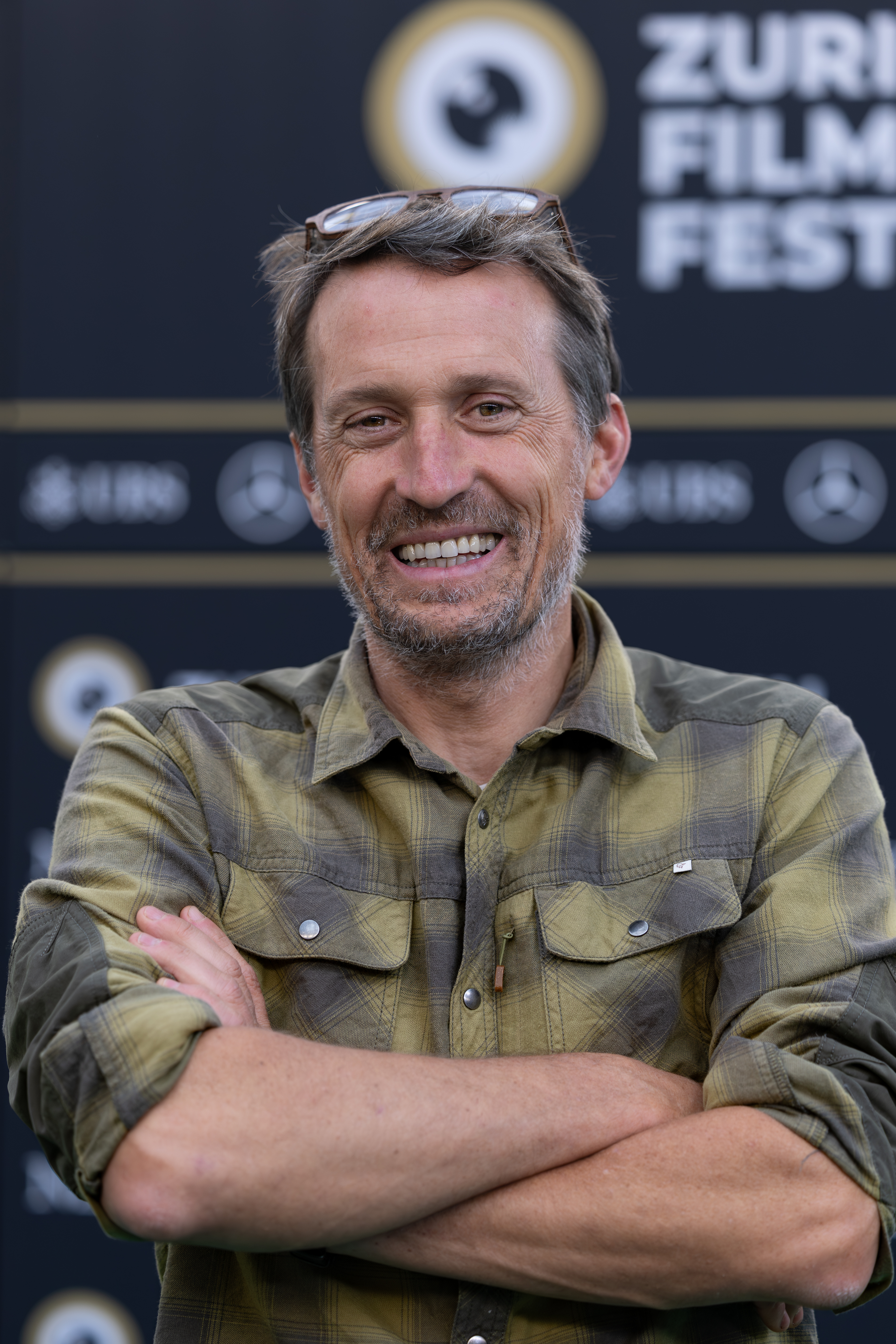
- Vincent Munier on the Green Carpet at the 2025 Zurich Film Festival.
- Born: April 14, 1976 (age 50); Epinal in Vosges, France
- Occupations: Wildlife photographer and documentary filmmaker
- Notable work: The Velvet Queen
- Awards: Lumière Award; César Award for Best Documentary Film
- Website: www.vincentmunier.com

Vincent Munier (born 14 April 1976) is a French wildlife photographer and documentary filmmaker. Among his most notable works are his photographs of arctic wolves and snow leopards. He co-directed a film about snow leopards, The Velvet Queen (2021), which received the César Award for Best Documentary Film.

== Life and work ==
Vincent Munier was born on 14 April 1976 in Épinal in Vosges, northeastern France. He began to photograph animals in the Vosges forests and mountains at the age of twelve, aided by his father. Upon graduation from high school, he dedicated himself to wildlife photography and started traveling in remote corners of the world chasing wild nature. For several months, he followed a flock of cranes in their migration journey. This experience resulted in his first book, Le Ballet des grues, published in 1999. As an inspiration to his work, he referred to Michio Hoshino and Jim Brandenburg.

Munier is a strong advocate of respectful, slow-paced photography. He studies behaviors and eating habits of animals and sometimes spends weeks on site without taking photos in order not to disturb the wildlife. Munier received the Eric Hosking Award in 2000, 2001 and 2002. He was the first photographer to receive this award three times.

Munier prefers to create landscape photographs with animals that viewers might not discover immediately. Colleagues praise his photographs for their poesy and their commitment to the overall atmosphere and focus on an entire scene, a moment in the life of the wildlife, instead of merely putting a rare animal in the frame.

He is known for photographing in snow, which he likes due to the lighting associated with it, how it omits non-essential details from the image and the fact that animals manage to live in remote and harsh environments. Notable are his photographs of arctic wolves on Ellesmere Island in Canada, which he took during six years of expeditions, and became the basis for his photo-book Arctique (2015).

His quest to photograph snow leopards began in 2011 and involved six trips to Tibet before he first encountered the animal in 2016. It resulted in two photo-books about Tibet and snow leopards, Tibet: promesse de l'invisible and Tibet: Minéral animal, both published in 2018 and the latter with texts by the writer Sylvain Tesson who joined one of the expeditions. His quest chasing the snow leopard became the subject of Tesson's book The Art of Patience, which also includes photographs by Munier. It also became the subject of his first documentary film, The Velvet Queen, co-directed with Marie Amiguet and released in 2021. The Velvet Queen was screened at numerous film festivals around the world, including the Cinéma for the Climate selection at Cannes, and won the César and the Lumière Awards for the Best Documentary.

As of 2024, Munier is working on his second feature, Whispering in the Woods. The film will shoot in Vosges, Sweden and Slovenia, among other locations, and will be produced by Pierre-Emmanuel Fleurantin and Laurent Baujard.

== Selected publications ==
Bibliography adapted from France Inter.

- Le Ballet des grues, with Alain Salvi, 2000
- Le Loup, with Philippe Huet and Julie Delfour, 2003
- Tancho, with Zéno Bianu, 2004
- L'Ours, with Philippe Huet, 2005
- Blanc nature, with Lysiane Ganousse, 2006
- Clair de brume: Regards sur les Vosges, text by Laurent Joffrion, 2007
- Kamtchatka: La vie sauvage aux confins du monde, text by Anna Konevskaya, 2008
- Au fil des songes, with Michel Munier, text by Charlélie Couture, 2010
- De crépuscules en crépuscules, text by Pierre Pelot, 2011
- Arctique, 2015
- Tibet: promesse de l'invisible, 2018
- Tibet: Minéral animal: sur les traces de la panthère des neiges, text by Sylvain Tesson, 2018

== Filmography ==
- The Velvet Queen (2021)
- Whispers in the Woods (2024)
