= Jean-Gabriel Périot =

French filmmaker (born 1974)

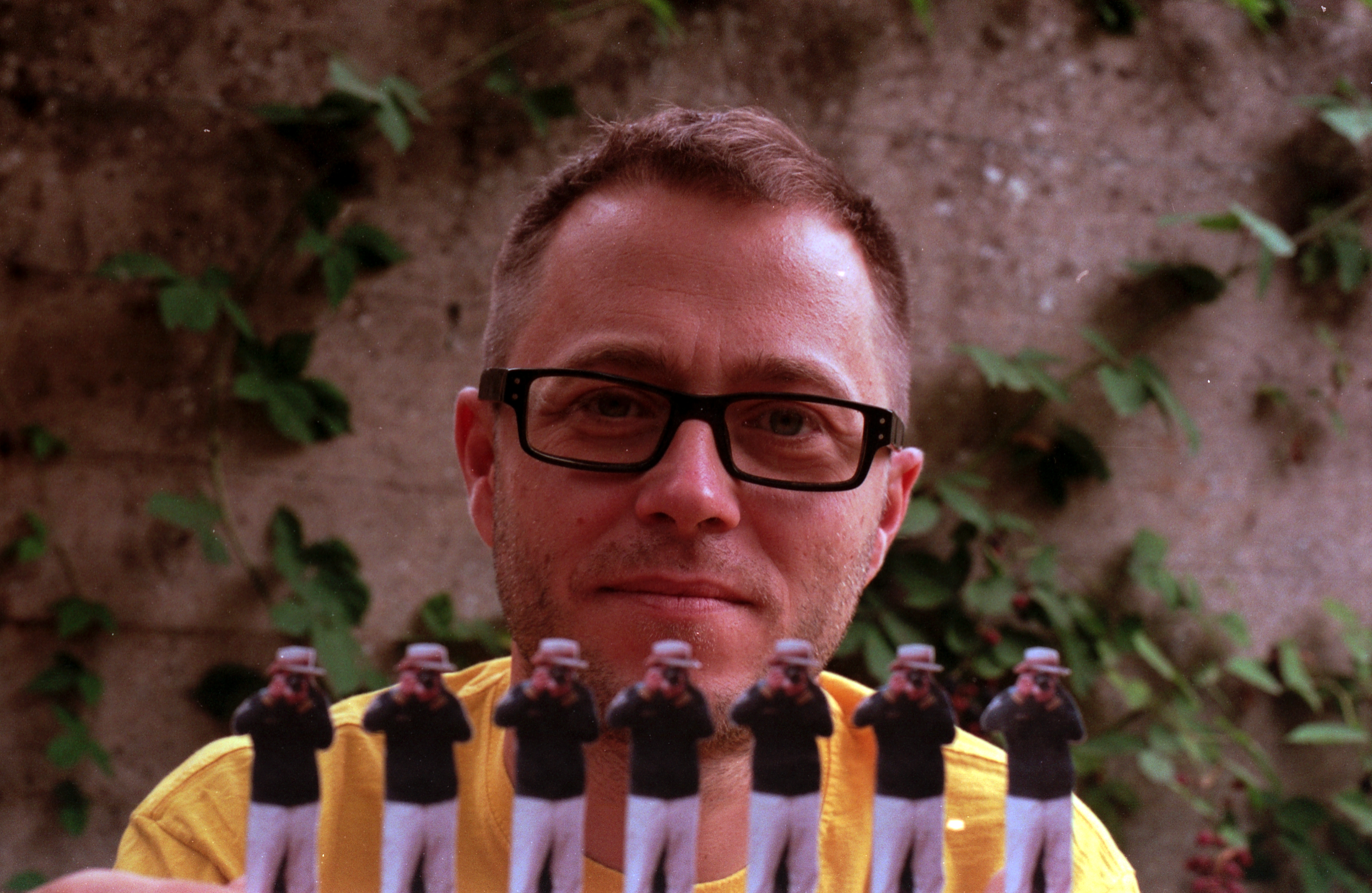
- Born: 1974; Bellac, France
- Occupation: Filmmaker
- Years active: 2001–present
- Website: http://www.jgperiot.net

Jean-Gabriel Périot is a French filmmaker.

== Biography ==
He lived in southern France and Guadeloupe before moving to Paris.

Périot never went to a film school, instead he studied media and communication. While working in the audiovisual service at Centre Georges Pompidou he turned to editing and got introduced to archives.

His favourite filmmaker include: Dziga Vertov, Michael Haneke, Jean-Luc Godard and Guy Debord.

Périot currently shares his time between Paris and Nice.

== Filmography ==
=== Feature films ===
- A German Youth (2015)
- Summer Lights (2017)
- Our Defeats (2019)
- Returning to Reims (Fragments) (2021)

=== Short films ===
- Some Joy In This Struggle (2018)
- Song For The Jungle (2018)
- If We Have To Disappear It Will Be Without Disquiet But We Will Fight Until The End (2014)
- WE ARE BECOME DEATH (2014)
- Optimism (2013)
- The Day Has Conquered The Night (2013)
- The Devil (2012)
- Our Days, Absolutely, Have To Be Enlightened (2012)
- Looking At The Dead (2011)
- The Barbarians (2010)
- The Delicate Art Of The Bludgeon (2009)
- Between Dogs And Wolves (2008)
- 200000 Phantoms (2007)
- Under Twilight (2006)
- Even If She Had Been A Criminal... (2006)
- Dies Irae (2005)
- Undo (2005)
- We Are Winning, Don't Forget (2004)
- 21.04.02 (2002)
