= Claire Simon =

French film director

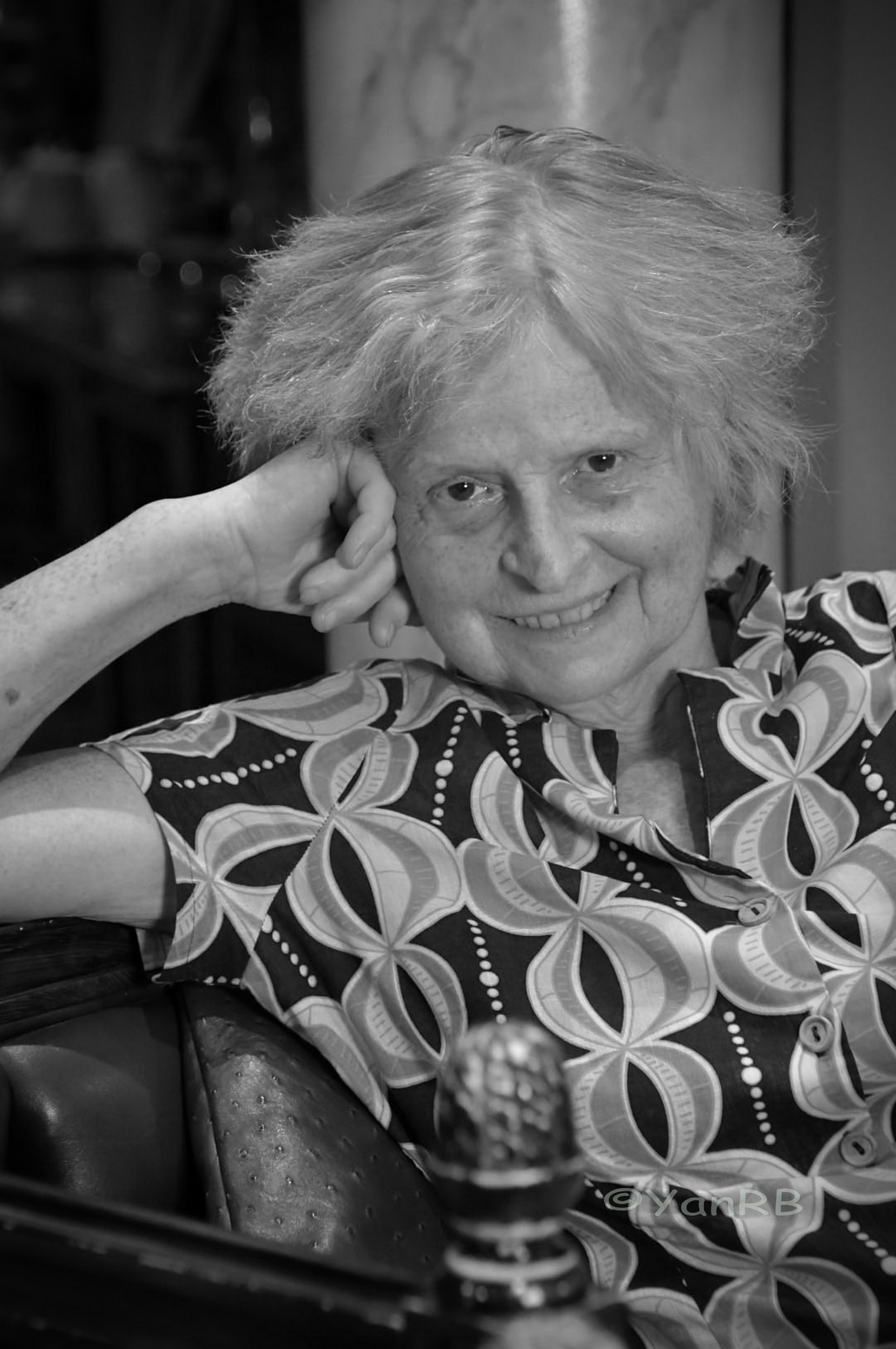
Claire Simon 2023

Claire Simon is a French screenwriter, actress, cinematographer, editor, and director.

== Early life and education ==
Simon was born in Britain and raised in southern France. She grew up in a family of writers and painters.

She took courses in anthropology and studied Arabic and Berber.

== Career ==
Simon first worked in the film world when she did an internship to work as an editor at the Algiers Cinematheque.

In the 1980s, she started to make narrative shorts. She received a scholarship to attend a prestigious documentary workshop led by Jean Rouch, one of the founders of cinéma-vérité.

== Distinctions ==
=== Selections ===
Three of her films have been selected for the Quinzaine des réalisateurs, an independent section held in parallel to the Cannes Film Festival: Sinon oui in 1997, Ça brûle in 2006, and Les Bureaux de Dieu in 2008.

The film Gare du Nord and the associated Géographie humaine were selected at the Festival international du film francophone de Namur in October 2013. There Gare du Nord was presented in official competition.

In 2013, a retrospective was dedicated to Simon at the Thessaloniki International Film Festival. The feature films Sinon, oui, Les Bureaux de Dieu, Ça brûle and Gare du Nord were shown. Another retrospective of her works was hosted by the 11th Play-Doc festival in Tui, Galicia.

Our Body was selected for the 73rd Berlin International Film Festival.

=== Awards ===
She was made an Officier de l'Ordre des Arts et des Lettres on January 16, 2014.

== Political views ==
In December 2023, alongside 50 other filmmakers, Simon signed an open letter published in Libération demanding a ceasefire and an end to the killing of civilians amid the 2023 Israeli invasion of the Gaza Strip, and for a humanitarian corridor into Gaza to be established for humanitarian aid, and the release of hostages.

== Filmography ==
=== Director ===
==== Short films ====
- 1976: Madeleine
- 1980: Tandis que j’agonise
- 1981: Moi, non ou l'argent de Patricia
- 1982: Mon cher Simon
- 1983: Une journée de vacances
- 1984: Barres Barres
- 1988: La Police
- 1991: Scènes de ménage
- 1992: Artiste Peintre

==== Feature films ====
- 1997: A Foreign Body (Sinon, oui)
- 1999: That's Just Like You (Ça, c'est vraiment toi)
- 2006: On Fire (Ça brûle)
- 2008: God's Offices (Les Bureaux de Dieu)
- 2013: Gare du Nord
- 2021: I Want to Talk About Duras (Vous ne désirez que moi)

==== Documentaries ====
- 1989: Les Patients
- 1992: Récréations
- 1995: At All Costs (Coûte que coûte)
- 2000: 800 km de différence/Romance
- 2002: Mimi
- 2013: Human Geography (Géographie humaine)
- 2016: The Woods Dreams Are Made Of (Le Bois dont les rêves sont faits)
- 2016: The Competition (Le Concours)
- 2018: Young Solitude (Premières solitudes)
- 2020: The Grocer's Son, the Mayor, the Village and the World (Le Fils de l'épicière, le maire, le village et le monde)
- 2023: Our Body (Notre Corps)

==== Documentary series ====
- 2019: Le Village (20 episodes)

=== Screenwriter ===
- Sinon, oui, 1997
- Ça, c'est vraiment toi, (téléfilm) 1999
- Ça brûle, 2006
- Les Bureaux de Dieu, 2008

=== Director of photography ===
- Récréations (MM), 1992
- 800 km de différence/Romance (DOC), 2000
- Mimi (DOC), 2002
- Les Bureaux de Dieu, 2008

=== Editor ===
- 1976: Chantons sous l'Occupation d'André Halimi
- 1979: La Ville à prendre by Patrick Brunie
- 1981: Plogoff, des pierres contre des fusils by Nicole Le Garrec
- 1982: Faux-fuyants by Alain Bergala and Jean-Pierre Limosin
- 1986: Gardien de la nuit by Jean-Pierre Limosin
- 2002: 800 km de différence - Romance by Claire Simon
- 2003: Mimi by Claire Simoin
