= A Tale of Love and Desire =

2021 Tunisian drama film

- French: Une histoire d'amour et de désir
- Directed by: Leyla Bouzid
- Written by: Leyla Bouzid
- Produced by: Sandra da Fonseca; Olivier Père
- Starring: Sami Outalbali; Zbeida Belhajamor; Diong-Kéba Tacu; Aurélia Petit; Mahia Zrouki; Bellamine Abdelmalek
- Cinematography: Sébastien Goepfert
- Edited by: Lilian Corbeille
- Music by: Lucas Gaudin
- Production companies: Blue Monday Productions; Arte France Cinéma (co-production)
- Distributed by: Hakka Distribution (Tunisia); Pyramide Distribution (France)
- Release date: 1 September 2021 (France)
- Running time: 102 minutes
- Countries: France; Tunisia
- Languages: French; Arabic
- Box office: $193,359

A Tale of Love and Desire (French: Une histoire d'amour et de désir) is a 2021 Tunisian drama film directed by Leyla Bouzid and co-produced by Sandra da Fonseca and Olivier Père. The film stars Sami Outalbali and Zbeida Belhajamor in the lead roles whereas Diong-Kéba Tacu, Aurélia Petit, Mahia Zrouki and Bellamine Abdelmalek made supportive roles. The film premiered on 1 September 2021, and received positive reviews from critics.

== Synopsis ==
The film revolves around an erotic Arabian love affair between Ahmed, an 18-year old, French of Algerian origin, and Farah, a young Tunisian girl.

== Cast ==
- Sami Outalbali as Ahmed Ouannas
- Zbeida Belhajamor as Farah Kallel
- Diong-Kéba Tacu as Saidou
- Aurélia Petit as Professeur Anne Morel
- Mahia Zrouki as Dalila
- Bellamine Abdelmalek as Karim
- Mathilde Lamusse as Léa
- Samir El Hakim as Hakim
- Khemissa Zarouel as Faouzia
- Sofia Lesaffre as Malika
- Baptiste Carrion-Weiss as Damien
- Charles Poitevin as Garçon rue Mouffetard
- Omar Khasb as Garçon bagarre cité
- Zaineb Bouzid as Chiraz

== Production ==
The film was directed by Leyla Bouzid and co-produced by Sandra da Fonseca and Olivier Père.

== Release ==
The film premiered on 1 September 2021.

The film was selected in the official competition for Best feature film in the 27th edition of the Panafrican Film and Television Festival of Ouagadougou (FESPACO) in October 2021 in Ouagadougou, the capital of Burkina Faso.

== Reception ==
The received positive reviews from critics at the Cannes Film Festival in July 101`. In France, the film averages 4/5 on the AlloCiné from 25 press reviews. On the review aggregator website Rotten Tomatoes, 100% of 6 critics' reviews are positive, with an average rating of 6.0/10.
