= Leyla Bouzid =

Tunisian screenwriter and film director

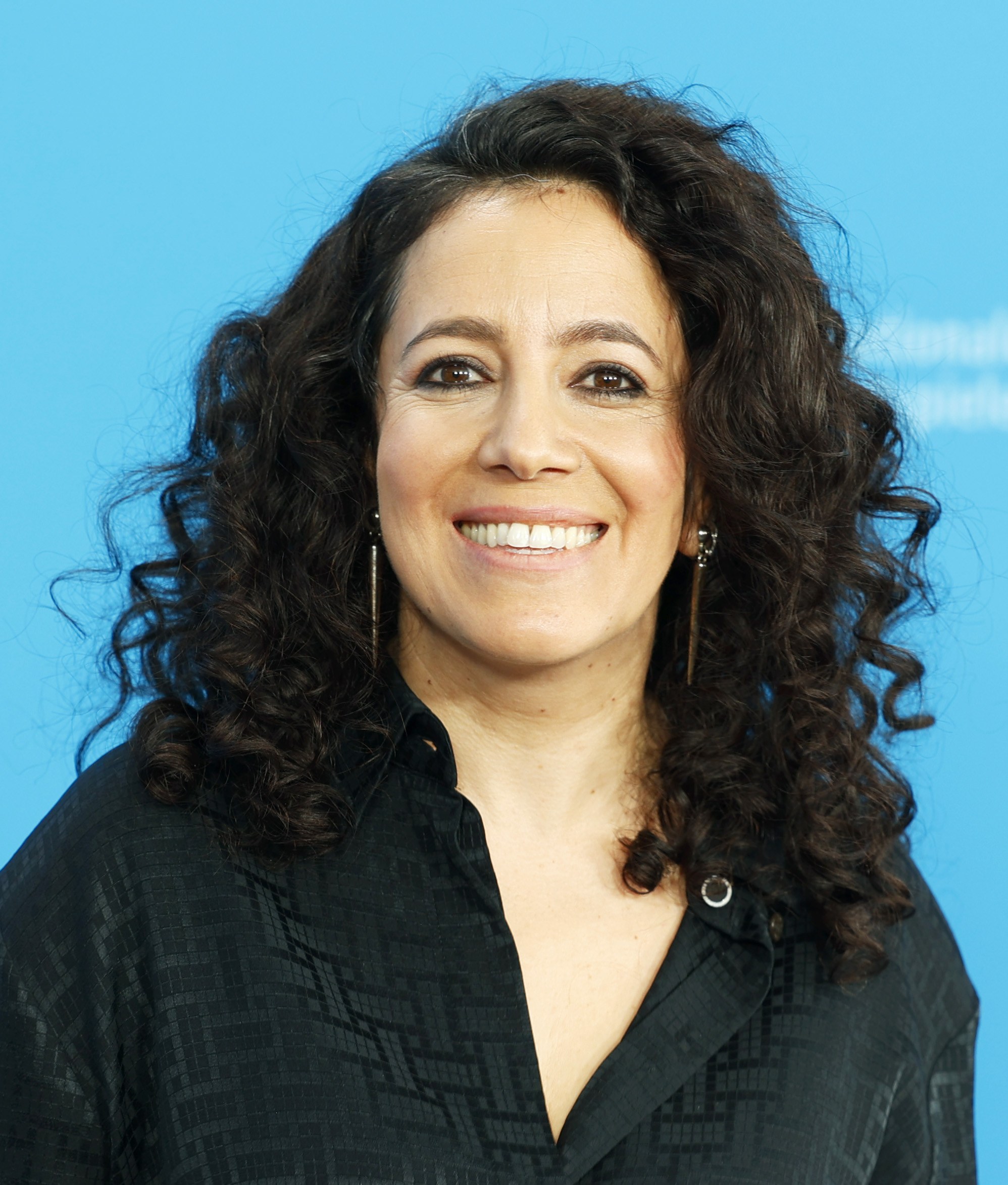
- Bouzid in 2026
- Born: October 11, 1984 (age 41); Tunis
- Occupations: screenwriter and film director
- Notable work: A Tale of Love and Desire
- Father: Nouri Bouzid

Leyla Bouzid (born on October 11, 1984 in Tunis), is a Tunisian screenwriter and film director.

== Early life and education ==
Born in Tunis on October 11, 1984, Bouzid is the daughter of the director Nouri Bouzid. She grew up in Tunisia, spending her adolescence in Tunis. After her baccalaureate, she moved to Paris to study literature at the Sorbonne. After achieving a first short film, Bonjour (Sbah el khir el), she completed her studies at La Fémis.

Bouzid short film Twitching was her graduation film for La Fémis; it was shot in Tunisia.

In 2012, Twitching screened in a competition at the Clermont-Ferrand International Short Film Festival, where it was well received. It also won the Grand Jury Prize of student films at the Festival Premiers Plans d'Angers.

== Career ==
In 2013, Zakaria was Bouzid's first produced short film.

In 2015, her feature film, As I Open My Eyes, was selected for several festivals. It won acclaim at events like the Venice Film Festival, the Carthage Film Festival, the International Festival of Young Filmmakers of Saint-Jean-de-Luz, the Festival International du Film Francophone de Namur, and the International Film Festival of Dubai.

As I Open My Eyes investigates the modern Tunisian identity through focusing on a young woman's personal relationships during the political instability in the months before the Tunisian Revolution. The film marries the private life of a young Tunisian woman with the story of her nation at the cusp of fundamental change; "the young female body of Farah, with her voice and gaze, plays a pivotal role in how the movie is intensely meandering between the political and the nonpolitical."

== Filmography ==
Year	Title	Director	Writer
2006	Bonjour (Sbah el khir)	Yes	Yes
2012	Offrande	No	Yes
2013	As I Open My Eyes	Yes	Yes
2021	A Tale of Love and Desire	Yes	Yes
2026	In a Whisper	Yes	Yes

Short film

Year	Title	Director	Writer
2010	Un Ange passe	Yes	Yes
2011	Mkhobbi Fi Kobba (Soubresauts; Shudders)	Yes	Yes
2013	Zakaria	Yes	Yes

== Awards and nominations ==
=== Awards ===
- 2010: Prix cininter – Un Ange passe – Festival du 1er court métrage de Pontault-Combault
- 2010: Prix des femmes de Fersnes – Un Ange passe – Festival international de films de femmes de Créteil
- 2012: Grand Prix – Soubresauts – Festival Premiers Plans d’Angers
- 2012: Grand prix du jury – Soubresauts – Festival du Cinéma Méditerranéen de Tétouan
- 2012: Birds Eye View Award – Soubresauts – Birds Eye View Film Festival, London
- 2012: Prix Ismu – Soubresauts – Festival del Cinema Africano, d’Asia e America Latina von Mailand
- 2012: Best Short Film – Soubresauts – Verona International Film Festival
- 2014: TIFF Award – Zakaria – Tangier International Film Festival
- 2014: Prix à la qualité – Zakaria – Centre national du cinéma et de l’image animée
- 2014: Prix des Lycéens – Zakaria – Festival del Cinema Africano, d’Asia e America Latina von Mailand
- 2015: Etalon de bronze – Zakaria – FESPACO
- 2015: Thomas Sankara Award – Zakaria – FESPACO
- 2015: Royal Air Morocco Ibn Battuta Award – Zakaria – FESPACO
- 2015: Tanit de bronze – Kaum öffne ich die Augen – Carthage Film Festival
- 2015: TV5 Monde Award – Kaum öffne ich die Augen – Carthage Film Festival
- 2015: FIPRESCI Award – Kaum öffne ich die Augen – Carthage Film Festival
- 2015: Bayard d’or – Kaum öffne ich die Augen – Festival international du film francophone de Namur
- 2015: „Mention spécial“ der Jury UGTT – Kaum öffne ich die Augen – Carthage Film Festival
- 2015: Bester Nachwuchsfilm – Kaum öffne ich die Augen – Französische Filmtage Tübingen-Stuttgart
- 2015: Europa Cinemas Label Award – Kaum öffne ich die Augen – 2015 Venice Film Festival
- 2015: Muhr Award – Kaum öffne ich die Augen – Dubai International Film Festival
- 2016: Kering Foundation „Women in Motion Young Talent Award“ – 2016 Cannes Film Festival
- 2016: Bester Film – Kaum öffne ich die Augen – East End Film Festival (EEFF) in London
- 2016: Sir Peter Ustinov Preis – Kaum öffne ich die Augen – LUCAS Film Festival
- 2016: Chevalier de l’Ordre de la République
- 2017: Bestes Drehbuch – Vent du Nord – geteilt mit Claude Le Pape und Walid Mattar – Carthage Film Festival

=== Nominations ===
- 2012: Compétitions film d’école – Soubresauts – Festival Premiers Plans d’Angers
- 2012: Compétitions film d’école – Soubresauts – Clermont-Ferrand International Short Film Festival
- 2015: Short film in competition – Zakaria – FESPACO
- 2015: Bronze Horse – Kaum öffne ich die Augen – Stockholm International Film Festival
- 2015: Giornate degli Autori – Kaum öffne ich die Augen – 2015 Venice Film Festival
- 2016: Audentia Award – Kaum öffne ich die Augen – International Istanbul Film Festival
- 2016: Lumiere Award – Kaum öffne ich die Augen – Lumière Film Festival, Lyon
- 2016: Golden Gate Award – Kaum öffne ich die Augen – San Francisco International Film Festival
- 2016: LUX-Preis – Kaum öffne ich die Augen – European Film Academy Lux Award
- 2016: Futurewave Youth Jury Award – Kaum öffne ich die Augen – Seattle International Film Festival
- 2016: International New Talent Competition - Grand Prize – Kaum öffne ich die Augen – Taipei Film Festival
- 2016: Transilvania Trophy – Kaum öffne ich die Augen – Transilvania International Film Festival
- 2017: Magritte Award for Best Foreign Film in Coproduction – Kaum öffne ich die Augen
- 2017: Grand Jury Prize „Best Picture“ – Kaum öffne ich die Augen – zusammen mit Sandra da Fonseca und Imed Marzouk – Riviera International Film Festival
- 2017: Jury Prize „Best Director“ – Kaum öffne ich die Augen – Riviera International Film Festival
- 2017: MovieZone Award – Kaum öffne ich die Augen – International Film Festival Rotterdam
- 2026: Competition for Golden Bear – À voix basse – Internationale Filmfestspiele Berlin

== Sources ==
=== Bibliography ===
- B.L. (2012-12-08), Soubresauts de Leyla Bouzid au Festival international du court-métrage de Clermont-Ferrand (in French), Jetset Magazine, Jetset, archived from the original on 2015-12-24
- Kamel Bouaouina (2015-01-31), Au Festival panafricain du cinéma d'Ouagadougou : Raja Amari et Leyla Bouzid (in French), Le Temps, archived from the original on 2015-12-25.
- Sara El Majhad (2015-03-10), Zakaria de Leyla Bouzid remporte le prix Ibn Battuta de Royal Air Maroc (in French), Aujourd'hui le Maroc, archived from the original on 2019-03-06.
- Smati, Maha (2015-09-14), Venice Days : la réalisatrice tunisienne Leyla Bouzid rafle deux prix (in French), Al Huffington Post
- Leyla Bouzid primée au Festival international du film de Saint Jean-de-Luz (in French), France Bleu Pays Basque, 2015-10-15, Basque.
- Diao, Claire (2015-12-01), "Les yeux bien ouverts de Leyla Bouzid", Le Monde (in French)
- Agence France-Presse (2015-12-18), À peine j'ouvre les yeux : un portrait vibrant de la jeunesse tunisienne (in French), L'Express.
- Mehdi Omaïs (2015-12-22), À peine j'ouvre les yeux : quand Leyla Bouzid chante la liberté en Tunisie (in French), Metronews.
- Guillaume Tion (2015-12-22), À peine j'ouvre les yeux, toile d'attente tunisienne (in French), Libération.
- Thomas Sotinel (2015-12-22), Je voulais qu'on voie le regard d'une jeune femme sur le corps d'un homme (in French), Le Monde.
- Jacques Mandelbaum (2015-12-22), À peine j'ouvre les yeux : un bourgeon rock dans le " printemps arabe " (in French), Le Monde.
- Djian, Laurent (2015-12-23), À peine j'ouvre les yeux : Leyla Bouzid capte la fureur de la jeunesse tunisienne (in French), L'Express.

=== External links ===
- "Leyla Bouzid". Africultures (in French)..
