= List of roles and awards of Mélanie Laurent =

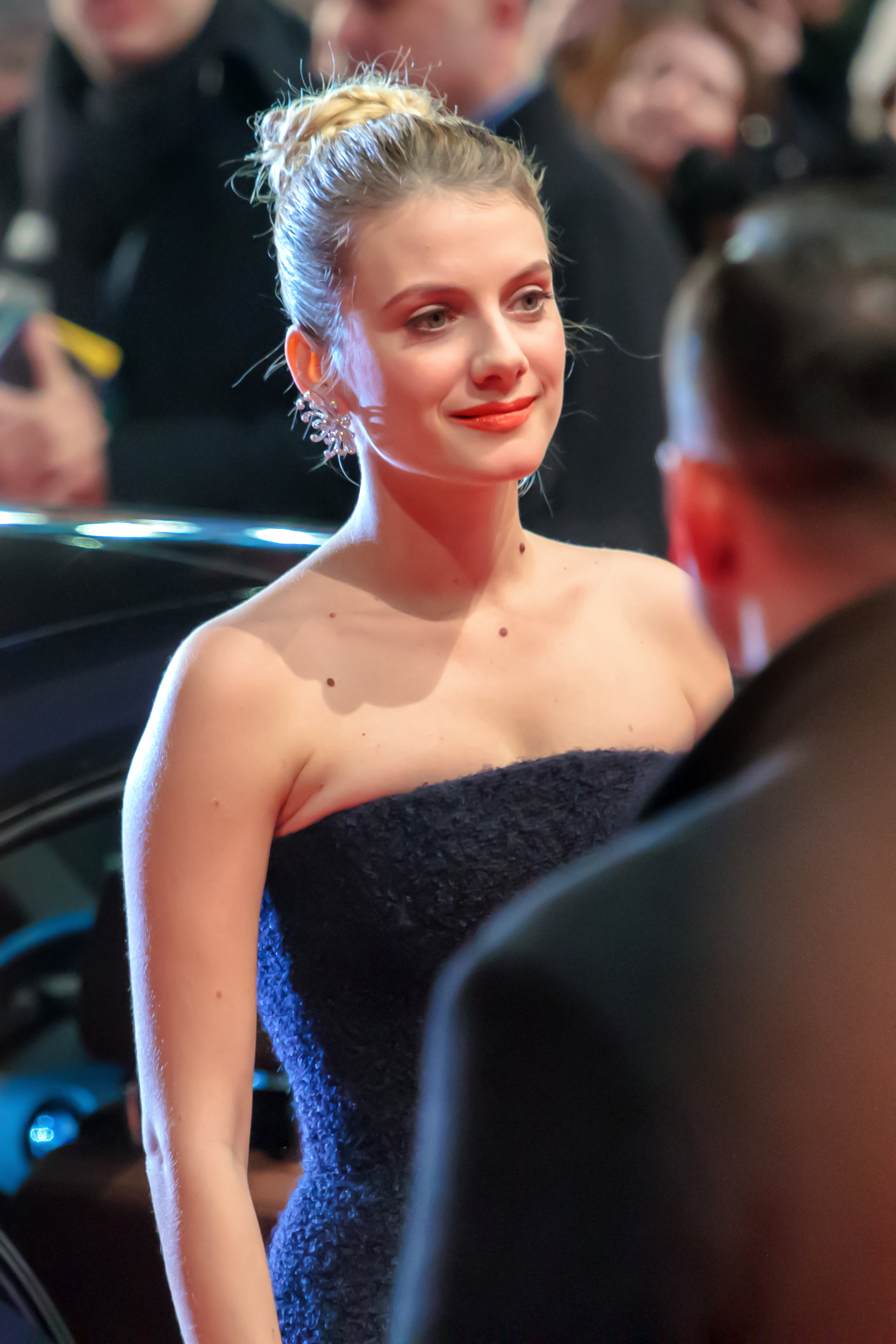
Laurent at the 63rd Berlin International Film Festival

Mélanie Laurent is a French actress, singer, screenwriter and director. She initially rose to prominence for her performance in the 2006 French drama film Don't Worry, I'm Fine for which she later won the César Award for Most Promising Actress and the Prix Romy Schneider. Laurent further became known to international audiences for her starring role as Shosanna Dreyfus in Quentin Tarantino's Inglourious Basterds (2009), for which she won the Online Film Critics Society and the Austin Film Critics Association Award for Best Actress. She went on star in commercially successful Hollywood films including, the comedy drama Beginners (2011), and the caper film Now You See Me (2013), with the former earning her a nomination at the San Diego Film Critics Society Award for Best Supporting Actress.

Laurent's notable works include Dikkenek (2006), a Franco-Belgian comedy film for which she won Étoiles d'Or for Best Female Newcomer, French war film Days of Glory (2006), Cédric Klapisch's Paris (2008) with an ensemble cast, The Round Up (2010), a French movie depicting the true story of a Jewish boy amidst the Vel' d'Hiv Roundup, comedy drama Et soudain, tout le monde me manque (2011) which won her the Best Actress Award at the Newport Beach Film Festival, French-American nature documentary Wings of Life (2011) serving as narrator, Night Train to Lisbon (2013), Canadian-Spanish psycho thriller Enemy (2013; an adaptation of José Saramago's novel The Double), and drama film Aloft (2014). In addition she has acted in numerous other French movies receiving accolades including the Étoiles d'or du cinéma français (Gold Star of French Cinema).

In her first theater appearance Laurent teamed up with French theatre director Nicolas Bedos and shared the stage with actor Jérôme Kircher in 2010 for Promenade de santé. Apart from her acting career, she has also directed several French movies including short-films for X Femmes, a television series, and Respire, an adaptation of Anne-Sophie Brasme's novel of the same name that screened in the Critics' Week section at the 2014 Cannes Film Festival. The latter won the Stockholm International Film Festival - Bronze Horse for Best Film. Laurent also directed the documentary film Demain, which won the César Award for Best Documentary Film and was also nominated for the Lumière Award for Best Documentary.

== Film ==
=== As actress ===
Key
†	Denotes films that have not yet been released

Year (Note: Refers to the film's earliest release.)	Title	Role	Notes
1999	The Bridge	Lisbeth	
2001	Ceci est mon corps	Clara	
2002	Summer Things	Carole	
2003	La Faucheuse	Isabelle	Short film
2003	Snowboarder	Célia	
2004	Une vie à t'attendre	The girl at the factory	
2004	Rice Rhapsody	Sabine	
2004	The Last Day	Louise	
2005	The Beat That My Heart Skipped	Minskov's Girlfriend	
2005	Les Visages d'Alice	Alice	Short film
2006	Days of Glory	Marguerite	
2006	Dikkenek	Natacha	Étoiles d'Or for Best Female Newcomer
2006	Don't Worry, I'm Fine	Élise "Lili" Tellier	César Award for Most Promising Actress; Lumière Award for Most Promising Actress; Étoiles d'Or for Best Female Newcomer; Nominated – Globes de Cristal Award for Best Actress; Nominated – NRJ Ciné Award for Best Young Talent in a Debut Film
2007	Hidden Love	Sophie	
2007	The Killer	Stella	
2007	Beluga		
2007	Room of Death	Lucie Hennebelle	Nominated – Lumière Award for Best Actress
2008	Paris	Laetitia	
2008	Voyage d'affaires	Hotel receptionist	Short film
2009	Jusqu'à toi	Chloé	
2009	Inglourious Basterds	Shosanna Dreyfus	Austin Film Critics Association Award for Best Actress; Broadcast Film Critics Association Award for Best Cast; Online Film Critics Society Award for Best Actress; Screen Actors Guild Award for Outstanding Performance by a Cast in a Motion Picture; Phoenix Film Critics Society Award for Best Cast; San Diego Film Critics Society Award for Best Performance by an Ensemble; Nominated – Detroit Film Critics Society Award for Best Supporting Actress; Nominated – Detroit Film Critics Society Award for Best Ensemble; Nominated – Empire Award for Best Actress; Nominated – San Diego Film Critics Society Award for Best Supporting Actress; Nominated – Saturn Award for Best Actress; Nominated – St. Louis Gateway Film Critics Association Award for Best Supporting Actress
2009	Le Concert	Anne-Marie Jacquet	
2010	The Round Up	Annette Monod	
2011	Beginners	Anna	Gotham Awards for Best Ensemble Cast; Nominated – San Diego Film Critics Society Award for Best Supporting Actress
2011	Pollen	Narrator	Voice
2011	Requiem for a Killer	Lucrèce	
2011	The Day I Saw Your Heart	Justine Dhrey	Newport Beach Film Festival for Best Actress
2011	The Adopted	Lisa	Also director and writer
2013	Night Train to Lisbon	Young Estefania	
2013	Now You See Me	Alma Dray	
2013	Epic	Mary Katherine	Voice, French dub
2013	Enemy	Mary	
2014	Aloft	Jannia Ressmore	
2015	Inside Out	Disgust	Voice, French dub
2015	Boomerang	Agathe Rey	
2015	By the Sea	Lea	
2016	Eternity	Mathilde	
2016	Mon nom à Pigalle		
2016	Mike	Dr. Bauer	
2017	Mon garçon	Marie Blanchard	
2018	Operation Finale	Hanna	
2018	Return of the Hero	Elisabeth Beaugrand	Nominated – Globes de Cristal Award for Best Actress - Comedy
2018	Mia and the White Lion	Alice Owen	
2019	6 Underground	Two	
2021	Oxygen	Elizabeth Hansen	
2021	The Mad Women's Ball	Genevieve	Also director and writer
2023	Murder Mystery 2	Claudette	
2023	Wingwomen	Carole	Also director and writer
2024	The Flood	Marie Antoinette	
2025	The Wonderers	Madeleine Roussier	
2026	The Good Lawyer	Iris Saint Didier	
TBA	Kristallnacht †	Berta	Post-production

=== As filmmaker ===
Year	Title	Credited as		Notes
Year	Title	Director	Screenwriter	Notes
2008	De moins en moins	Yes	Yes	Short film Nominated – 2008 Cannes Film Festival - Short Film Palme d'Or
2012	Surpêche	Yes	Yes	Documentary short Also cinematographer, editor and producer
2014	Breathe	Yes	Yes	Nominated – Stockholm International Film Festival - Bronze Horse for Best Film
2015	Tomorrow	Yes	No	Documentary film César Award for Best Documentary Film; Nominated – Lumière Award for Best Documentary
2017	Plonger	Yes	Yes	
2018	Galveston	Yes	No	
2024	Libre	Yes	Yes	

== Television ==
Key
†	Denotes films that have not yet been released

Year	Title	Role	Notes
1998	Les Malheurs de Sophie	Young Madeleine de Fleurville	Episode: "Retour en France"
2000	Route de nuit	Francesca	Television film
2003	Jean Moulin, une affaire française	Young Alice Arguel	Television film
2008	X Femmes	—N/a	Director and writer Episode: "At Her Feet"
2026	Fauda	Anne Zaytoun (née Aubert)	
2026	The Hunt	Krystel	6 episodes

== Theatre ==
- Promenade de santé by Nicolas Bedos (2010)
