= Dave Pino =

American musical artist

- Born: Waltham, Massachusetts
- Genres: Rock, pop rock, metal
- Occupation(s): Musician, songwriter
- Instrument: Guitar
- Years active: 1995–present
- Formerly of: Andrew W.K., PPL MVR, Powerman 5000, Damone, Waltham

Dave Pino is an American guitarist, songwriter and producer, best known as the songwriter/guitarist and co-founder of the bands Damone and Waltham.

== Life and career ==
Pino was born in 1977 to immigrant parents in Massachusetts. In 1999, his band Waltham was recognized by the Boston Music Awards as Best New Artist. In 2002, Pino's side project Damone signed a record deal with RCA Records; the band released the album "From The Attic".

Pino performed in Powerman 5000 from 2007 to 2012. He is currently performing with Andrew W.K. and PPL MVR. He resides in Burbank, California.

He co-owns Pino Bros. Ink, a tattoo parlor in Cambridge, MA with his brother Frank Pino Jr.

=== Other bands ===
Pino has played in various other bands including:

- Jetfuel (Jet and Ben Crandell of Sam Black Church)
- Piggy D. And The Evacuation Plan (Piggy D. of Rob Zombie)
- Ankla (Ramón Ortíz of Puya)
- Seemless (Jesse Leach of Killswitch Engage)
- Burn Your Wishes (Adam D. of Killswitch Engage and Ken Susi of Unearth)
- Robby Roadsteamer
- Damone
- Pino produced the single "How To Be Human" with Spider One on the 2014 Powerman 5000 album, Builders of the Future

=== Movies ===
Movies that feature Dave Pino's music

- Freaky Friday (Walt Disney Pictures)
- Rugrats Go Wild (Paramount Pictures)
- It Runs In the Family (MGM)
- Thunderbirds (Universal Studios)
- America's Heart and Soul (Walt Disney Pictures)

=== Other work ===
Dave Pino has also worked on projects outside of his bands:

- Composer for VH1 "Stevie TV" Season 2
- Art Director for Alice Cooper's "Along Came A Spider"
- Stock Footage actor for the Samsung commercial for the SCH-U900
- Actor in the independent film God Of Vampires
- Art Direction for John 5's "The Devil Knows My Name" instructional DVD
- Stock Footage for American Idol's "America's Top Band" TV Commercial
- Guitarist on the tracks "Ready to Shave" and "Christmas Pain in Christmas Town" from the video game Hypnospace Outlaw

== Discography ==
- 2002 – Waltham - Permission To Build, Waltham (Rykodisc Records)
- 2003 – Damone - From the Attic (RCA Records)
- 2005 - Waltham - Waltham (Rykodisc Records)
- 2009 - Powerman 5000 - Somewhere on the Other Side of Nowhere (Mighty Loud!/ Fontana)
- 2011 - Powerman 5000 - Copies, Clones & Replicants - Cleopatra Records
- 2014 - Waltham - Wicked Waltham
