= Cineaste =

Cineaste (or cinéaste) may refer to:

- A cinema enthusiast; a cinephile
- A person involved in filmmaking
- Cinéaste (magazine), a quarterly periodical about films
- Cinéast(e)s, a 2013 documentary film about women filmmakers
