= Eager Bodies =

- Theatrical release poster
- Directed by: Xavier Giannoli
- Written by: Xavier Giannoli
- Produced by: Edouard Weil
- Starring: Laura Smet; Nicolas Duvauchelle
- Cinematography: Xavier Giannoli; Yorick Le Saux
- Edited by: Philippe Kotlarski
- Music by: Alexandre Desplat
- Distributed by: Pan-Européenne Distribution
- Release date: 23 April 2003
- Running time: 94 minutes
- Country: France
- Language: French

Eager Bodies (French: Les Corps impatients) is a 2003 French drama film directed by Xavier Giannoli.

== Cast ==
- Laura Smet - Charlotte
- Nicolas Duvauchelle - Paul
- Marie Denarnaud - Ninon
- Catherine Salviat - La Mère
