= Le Plaisir (et ses petits tracas) =

- Theatrical release poster
- Directed by: Nicolas Boukhrief
- Written by: Nicolas Boukhrief; Dan Sasson
- Starring: Mathieu Kassovitz; Vincent Cassel; Julie Gayet
- Cinematography: Jean-Max Bernard
- Edited by: Jacqueline Mariani
- Music by: Nicolas Baby
- Distributed by: PolyGram Film Distribution
- Release date: 1998
- Running time: 100 minutes
- Country: France
- Language: French

Le Plaisir (et ses petits tracas) (Pleasure and its little inconveniences) is the second French film by Nicolas Boukhrief, produced in 1998.

== Plot ==
The film tells the story of eight characters over seven interwoven storylines. The action takes place across Europe; France, Italy and a central European battlefield. The film reunites Vincent Cassel and Mathieu Kassovitz for the first time on screen since Kassovitz's 1995 La Haine, as serial killer Michaël and comedian Roland, respectively. The film also features a cameo from Cassel's future wife Monica Bellucci.
