= Plonger =

2017 film

- Film poster
- Directed by: Mélanie Laurent
- Written by: Mélanie Laurent
- Starring: Gilles Lellouche
- Release dates: 9 September 2017 (TIFF); 6 December 2017 (France)
- Running time: 102 minutes
- Country: France
- Language: French
- Budget: $6 million
- Box office: $181.000

Plonger is a 2017 French drama film directed by Mélanie Laurent. It was screened in the Special Presentations section at the 2017 Toronto International Film Festival.

== Plot ==
César, a former war correspondent who has transitioned into art criticism, enters into a passionate romantic relationship with Paz, a Spanish photographer. However, Paz experiences an unhappy pregnancy characterized by a lack of inspiration and a yearning for adventure. Shortly after the birth of their child, Paz decides to leave.

== Cast ==
- Gilles Lellouche as César
- María Valverde as Paz Aguilera
- Ibrahim Ahmed as Marin
- Marie Denarnaud as The Hotel Owner
- Noémie Merlant as The Young Artist
- Albert Delpy as Léo
