= Fantastic Fungi =

2019 documentary film

- Film poster
- Directed by: Louie Schwartzberg
- Written by: Mark Monroe
- Produced by: Lyn Davis Lear; Louie Schwartzberg; Elease Lui Stemp
- Starring: Paul Stamets; Michael Pollan; Eugenia Bone; Andrew Weil; Giuliana Furci
- Narrated by: Brie Larson
- Edited by: Kevin Klauber; Annie Wilkes
- Music by: Adam Peters
- Production company: Moving Art
- Release date: October 11, 2019 (United States)
- Running time: 80 minutes
- Country: United States
- Language: English
- Box office: $1,672,211

Fantastic Fungi is a 2019 American documentary film directed by Louie Schwartzberg. The film combines time-lapse cinematography, CGI, and interviews in an overview of the biology, environmental roles, and various uses of fungi. The film features interview segments with Paul Stamets and Michael Pollan, and is narrated by Brie Larson.

== Reception ==
On review aggregator website Rotten Tomatoes, the film has a 100% approval rating based on 23 reviews, with an average ranking of 7.7/10. The site's critical consensus reads, "As visually dazzling as it is thought-provoking, Fantastic Fungi sets out to make audiences see mushrooms differently -- and brilliantly succeeds." On Metacritic, the film has a score of 70 out of a 100 by 8 reviews, indicating "generally favorable" reviews.

Critics praised Schwartzberg's time-lapse cinematography. Some critics found the narration unnecessary.

Josh Kupecki of The Austin Chronicle said "visual affectations aside, Fantastic Fungi is an engaging look at the scope of an organism that is so much more than a pizza topping or an ingredient in beef stroganoff". Andrew Pulver of The Guardian wrote "With its spectacular footage of growth and decay and impassioned speeches about the magic of mushrooms, this documentary is a treat for the eye and ear". Rex Reed of The New York Observer called the documentary "charming", while John DeFore of The Hollywood Reporter called the film an "[e]ye-opening eye candy".

According to Robert Abele of the Los Angeles Times "it edges a little too close to being a commercial, but that's a nitpick when the totality of Fantastic Fungi is so entertaining, informative and appealingly hopeful about the hard-working cure-all for our ailing world lying beneath our feet".

== See also ==
- List of psychedelic documentaries
- Edible mushroom
- Evolution of fungi
