= Naidra Ayadi =

French actress

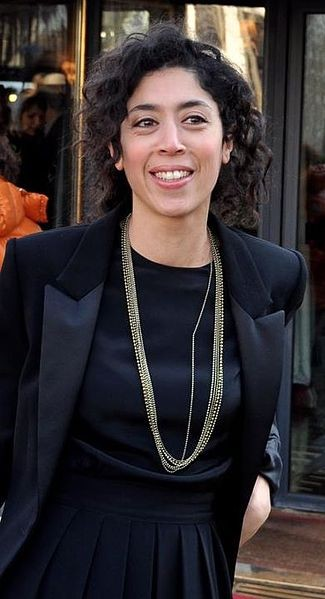
- Naidra Ayadi in February 2012
- Born: Saint-Ouen, Seine-Saint-Denis, France
- Occupation: Actress
- Years active: 2005 - present

Naidra Ayadi is a French actress. She won the César Award for Most Promising Actress in 2012 for her role in the film Polisse.

== Life and career ==
Naidra Ayadi was born to a Tunisian family in Saint-Ouen, Seine-Saint-Denis, in the northern suburbs of Paris. She spent several years working mainly in theatre acting and television before her breakthrough film role in 2011's Polisse, directed by Maïwenn. Ayadi won the César Award for Most Promising Actress for her role in the film; she shared the award with Clotilde Hesme, who won it for her role in Angel & Tony (2011).

== Filmography ==
=== Feature films ===
Year	Title	Role	Director	Notes
2005	Zim and Co.	Safia	Pierre Jolivet	
2011	Polisse	Nora	Maïwenn	César Award for Most Promising Actress
2013	Voyage sans retour	Kad's sister	François Gérard	
2013	Prêt à tout	Rachida	Nicolas Cuche	
2013	Les Gazelles	Myriam	Mona Achache	
2013	SMS	Leila	Gabriel Julien-Laferrière	
2013	Une histoire banale	Nathalie's colleague	Audrey Estrougo	
2015	Jailbirds	Robocop	Audrey Estrougo	
2016	Il a déjà tes yeux	Anna	Lucien Jean-Baptiste	
2017	Pris de court	Nathalie	Emmanuelle Cuau	
2022	The Origin of Evil	Samira	Sébastien Marnier	
2022	The Sixth Child	Judge	Léopold Legrand	
2026	Diane in the Loop		Ann Sirot and Raphaël Balboni	

=== Television ===
Year	Title	Role	Director	Notes
2014	3 x Manon	Zohra	Jean-Xavier de Lestrade	Miniseries
2014	Vogue la vie	Virginie	Claire de La Rochefoucauld	TV movie
2015	Rappelle-toi	Maître Yasmine Benatef	Xavier Durringer	TV movie
2016	La Bête curieuse	Nadia	Laurent Perreau	TV movie
2017	Paris, etc.	Nora	Zabou Breitman	TV series
2017	Héroïnes	Selma Zerktouni	Audrey Estrougo	TV series
Since 2017	Black Spot	Leila Barami	Mathieu Missoffe	TV series
2022	Oussekine	Fatna Oussekine	Antoine Chevrollier	Miniseries
2022	Parallels	Sofia Belkerbils	Benjamin Rocher & Jean-Baptiste Saurel	TV series

=== Director / Writer ===
Year	Title	Notes
2017	Leila	

== Theater ==
Year	Title	Author	Director	Notes
2007	Meurtres de la princesse juive	Armando Llamas	Philippe Adrien	Théâtre de la Tempête

== Awards and nominations ==
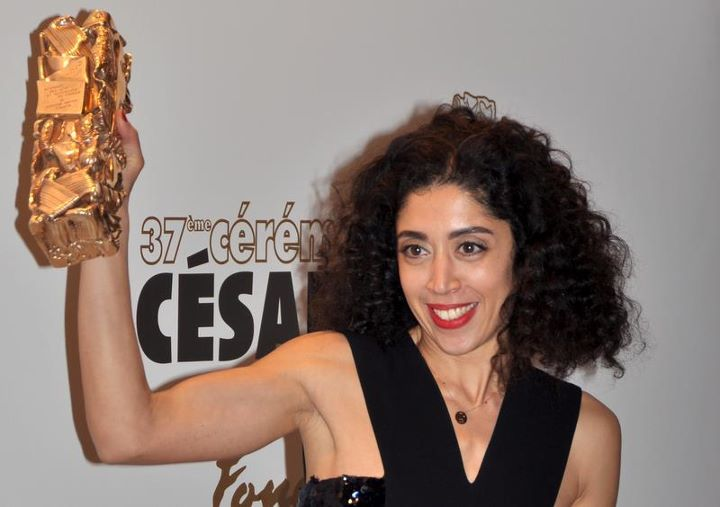
Naidra Ayadi at the 37th César Awards

=== César Award ===
Year	Nominated work	Category	Result
2012	Polisse	Most Promising Actress	Won
