= Damone (band) =

American hard rock/glam metal band

- Origin: Waltham, Massachusetts, US
- Genres: Hard rock, power pop
- Years active: 2001–2008, 2019–present
- Labels: Island, RCA
- Members: Noelle LeBlanc; Mike Woods; Michael Vazquez; Luke Mangini; Mike Scrima
- Past members: Dustin Hengst; Dave Pino; Adam Rourke; Bryce Martin

Damone is an American rock band. The band originated in Waltham, a city located just west of Boston, Massachusetts and consisted of Noelle LeBlanc (vocals/guitar), Mike Woods (guitar), Michael Vazquez (bass guitar) and Dustin Hengst (drums).

== History ==
The band was formed by Adam Rourke and then-teenage singer/guitarist Noelle LeBlanc. The band was originally known as Noelle, and released an album called This Summer under that name, which was later re-recorded as From the Attic.

Damone released their first album, From the Attic, on RCA in 2003. Original lead guitarist Dave Pino left the band some time in 2004, being replaced by Mike Woods from Boston.

While working on new material, the band was dropped from its label after requesting to be released. They were quickly picked up by Island Def-Jam Records.

Damone released their second LP, Out Here All Night, on iTunes in early 2006, with the CD version released on May 23, 2006. There was heavy rotation of the song "Out Here All Night", and the band toured extensively throughout the Americas, Canada, Asia & Europe.

Damone released their third album, Roll the Dice, in 2008. They then toured the UK as support to the Wildhearts.

The band's song "Revolution" is the official anthem for the New England Revolution of Major League Soccer.

In 2012 Candlebox covered "Out Here All Night" on their album Love Stories & Other Musings.

On December 8, 2011, the band's drummer, Dustin Hengst, died at the age of 39 from liver and kidney failure.

In April 2019, Damone announced they would reunite for two shows in Boston that July.

== Discography ==
=== Albums ===
- This Summer (2002) (as Noelle)
- From the Attic (2003)
- Out Here All Night (2006) #168 Billboard 200
- Roll the Dice (2008)

=== Singles ===
- "Frustrated Unnoticed" (2002) (as Noelle)
- "Frustrated Unnoticed" (re-release) (2003)
- "Out Here All Night" (2006) #32 Billboard Hot Modern Rock Tracks
- "Everybody Wants You" (2006)
- "Roll the Dice" (2008)

== Band members ==
- Noelle LeBlanc (lead vocals, guitar)
- Mike Woods (lead guitars, vocals)
- Vazquez (bass guitar, vocals)
- Luke Mangini (drums)
- Mike Scrima (keys)

== Previous members ==
- Dave Pino (guitar)
- Adam Rourke (drummer/engineer/producer)
- Bryce Martin (guitar)
- Dustin Hengst (drums; died 2011)
