= Une histoire banale =

- Film poster
- Directed by: Audrey Estrougo
- Written by: Audrey Estrougo
- Produced by: Audrey Estrougo; Lauren Grall
- Starring: Marie Denarnaud; Marie-Sohna Conde; Oumar Diaw; Renaud Astegiani
- Cinematography: Guillaume Schiffman; Julien Malichier
- Edited by: Céline Cloarec
- Music by: James "BKS" Edjouma
- Production companies: Six Onze Films; Les Canards Sauvages
- Distributed by: Damned Distribution
- Release date: 9 April 2014
- Running time: 82 minutes
- Country: France
- Language: French

Une histoire banale is a 2014 French drama film written, produced and directed by Audrey Estrougo. It tells the story of Nathalie, a young woman who works in the health care industry and whose life takes an abrupt turn during an encounter with a co-worker on a fateful evening. The film was made on a €8,000 budget which was raised through crowdfunding. Filming took place in Estrougo's flat over a period of three weeks.

== Cast ==
- Marie Denarnaud as Nathalie
- Marie-Sohna Conde as Sohna
- Oumar Diaw as Wilson
- Renaud Astegiani as Damien
- Vincent Londez as Calixte
- Steve Tran as Steve
- Nicolas Gob as Fabrice
- Frédéric Duff-Barbé as the Police Lieutenant
- Naidra Ayadi as Nathalie's colleague
- Benjamin Siksou as the man in the washroom
