= Wings of Life =

- North American release poster
- Directed by: Louis Schwartzberg
- Produced by: Grady Candler; Alix Tidmarsh
- Narrated by: Mélanie Laurent (France); Meryl Streep (United States)
- Edited by: Jonathan P. Shaw
- Music by: Steffen Aaskoven & Marc-George Andersen; Bliss
- Production companies: Disneynature; Blacklight Films
- Distributed by: Walt Disney Studios Motion Pictures France (France); Walt Disney Studios Home Entertainment (United States)
- Release dates: 16 March 2011 (France); 16 April 2013 (United States)
- Running time: 77 minutes
- Countries: France; United States
- Languages: French; English

Wings of Life (known as Pollen in France and Hidden Beauty: A Love Story That Feeds the Earth in the United Kingdom) is a 2011 nature documentary film directed by Louis Schwartzberg and released by Disneynature. It was released theatrically in France on 16 March 2011, with narration by Mélanie Laurent, and in home media markets across the US on 16 April 2013, with narration by Meryl Streep.

== Synopsis ==
The film's synopsis states:

A beautiful love story in danger. Our future depends on an amazing love story between the flowers and fauna consisting of bees, butterflies, birds, and bats, which allow these species to reproduce. Delicate and graceful, the flowers are not content to be the ultimate symbol of beauty. On the contrary, their vibrant colors and their exotic flavors are so many wonders that attract pollinators and drunk with desire. All these animals are involved in a complex dance of seduction on which one third of our crops, a dance without which we could not survive ... Pollen presents the unsung heroes of the global food chain. Their fantastic worlds are full of stories, drama and beauty. While a fragile and threatened, essential for the balance of the planet, it should now actively protect ...

== Production ==
Hidden Beauty was originally announced in April 2008 for Disneynature. At that time, the film was scheduled for a worldwide release in 2011.

== Release ==
The film was released as Pollen in France on 16 March 2011. The film was released on Blu-ray and DVD by Walt Disney Studios Home Entertainment in North America as Wings of Life on 16 April 2013.
