= Louie Schwartzberg =

American film director, producer and cinematographer (born 1950)

- Born: February 21, 1950 (age 76); Brooklyn, New York
- Education: UCLA Film School
- Occupations: Film director, cinematographer
- Known for: Time-lapse cinematography

Louie Schwartzberg (born February 21, 1950) is an American director, producer, and cinematographer. Since 2004, Schwartzberg has worked as a director for films, including the 2019 film, Fantastic Fungi, and the 2014 Netflix series, Moving Art.

Schwartzberg is recognized as a pioneer of high-end time-lapse cinematography. Schwartzberg is a visual artist who explores the connections between humans and the subtleties of nature and the environment.

== Early life and education ==
Schwartzberg grew up in Brooklyn, and his parents were Jewish Holocaust survivors. He graduated from UCLA Film School with an MFA in the early seventies. Schwartzberg chaired and served as executive director of the Action! Vote Coalition and served on the board of the Earth Communications Office and the Environmental Media Association. He is a member of both the Directors Guild of America and the Academy of Motion Arts and Sciences.

== Career ==
Schwartzberg is credited by many with pioneering the contemporary stock footage industry by founding Energy Film Library, a global company, which was acquired by Getty Images in 1997.

In 2012 he completed Wings of Life, a documentary feature for Disneynature, narrated by Meryl Streep. It won Best Theatrical Program at the Jackson Hole Science Media Awards 2012, and also won a Best Cinematography Roscar Award. The film reveals the fragile relationship between flowers and their pollination partners.

In November, 2013 Mysteries of the Unseen World, a 3D-IMAX film with National Geographic was released in theaters worldwide. The film is a journey into invisible worlds that are too slow, too fast, too small and too vast for the human eye to see.

In 2013, Schwartzberg founded the company Moving Art, which produces High Definition 2D and 3D movies featuring nature, cityscapes, and visual effects. He also founded the large format film company, BlackLight Films, featuring content such as documentaries and children's programming. Projects include America's Heart and Soul a story of Americans who are remarkable in their everyday lives, for Walt Disney Pictures; “America!”, a 26-episode half-hour series for The Hallmark Channel; and “Chasing the Light,” a one-hour documentary that aired on PBS.

On April 6, 2014, he appeared in an interview with Oprah Winfrey on Super Soul Sunday (OWN TV) episode titled, The World Beyond What We Can See. For Netflix, he also made the series called Moving Art with six topics; flowers, forests, oceans, deserts, underwater and waterfalls. The seventh topic, about mushrooms, is the film Fantastic Fungi, released in 2019. Netflix has an additional six topics lined up: Koh Samui, Iceland, Africa, Angkor Wat, whales and dolphins, Big Sur and the Galapagos.

His imagery was previously featured at the Vatican on December 8, 2015, when Pope Francis permitted art and nature projections on St. Peter’s Basilica for the Jubilee celebration, highlighting climate awareness.

In 2022, Schwartzberg released Gratitude Revealed, a documentary 40 years in the making that explores how gratitude can reconnect us to ourselves, each other, and the planet. The film has been featured in over 200 in-person events, more than 50 virtual screenings, and 200 nonprofit partnership showings. It received extensive social media engagement and curriculum downloads, expanding its educational impact.

In 2023, Schwartzberg’s visuals appeared at Tomorrowland and CORE Festival in Brussels. At Tomorrowland, mushroom visuals from Fantastic Fungi were displayed across a 130-foot-wide screen during performances. At CORE Festival, he gave a keynote in a 360° LED installation that immersed audiences in the world of fungi.

In 2024, Schwartzberg’s nature imagery was projected on the 580,000 sq ft LED exterior of The Sphere in Las Vegas as part of a two-year Earth Day installation, using 16K resolution visuals viewed by thousands daily.

Schwartzberg’s upcoming projects include:

- GAIA, a story of ecological rebirth through a journey into the mycelium network following a planetary cataclysm;
- Hidden Beauty, a consciousness-shifting project developed alongside psilocybin-based clinical trials;
- WONDER, a film examining unseen natural phenomena that provoke a sense of awe and exploration.

== Speaking engagements ==
Schwartzberg is active in the TED community, having spoken in 2011 at the following: TEDxSoCal, TEDxSF and TEDxJacksonhole, TEDxSMU, and TED Vancouver in March 2014. He has delivered speeches at NASA, Global Spa and Wellness Summit, The Nantucket Project and Bioneers. His YouTube videos have collected over 60 million views. Schwartzberg has also spoken at major international events and venues not currently listed in the article, including:

- United Nations Climate Summit (COP22 in Paris and COP26 in Glasgow)
- The Emmy Awards, where he presented a Lifetime Achievement Award to David Attenborough
- Mindvalley (Estonia)
- CORE Festival and Tomorrowland (Brussels), where he gave keynotes and immersive art experiences based on Fantastic Fungi
- The Vatican (St. Peter’s Basilica, 2015), where his imagery was projected as part of the “Fiat Lux” climate awareness installation sanctioned by Pope Francis

== Filmography ==
Year	Movie Title	Role	Notes
2022	Gratitude Revealed	Director and Producer	
2019	Fantastic Fungi	Director	
2019	Moving Art	Director	Season 3
2015	Moving Art: Waterfalls	Director	
2015	Moving Art: Underwater	Executive producer	Mostly focuses on sea animals
2014	A World of Solutions	Director	
2014	What's Possible	Director	
2014	4 original documentaries for Netflix: Moving Art: Flowers; Forests; Oceans; Deserts	Director	
2013	Mysteries of the Unseen World	Director	
2012	Wings of Life	Director	
2006	Chasing the Light		
2004	America's Heart and Soul	Director	
2002	Men in Black II	additional cinematography	
2002	Stuart Little 2	additional cinematography	
2000	Erin Brockovich	additional cinematography	
2000	America! for Hallmark Channel		
1999	Any Given Sunday	additional cinematography	
1992	Oceans of Air for Discovery Channel		
1988	Vice Versa	Visual Effects Supervisor	
1985	The Heavenly Kid	visual effects	
1984	The Ice Pirates	time lapse photography	
1984	The Glitter Dome	time lapse photography	
1983	The Jupiter Menace	time lapse photography	
1982	Koyaanisqatsi	time lapse photography	
1980	The Final Countdown	time lapse photography	
1980	Altered States	time lapse photography	
1980	Xanadu	time lapse photography	
1977	Aliens from Spaceship Earth		

== Bibliography ==
Year	Title	Publisher
2004	America's Heart and Soul	Black Light Films
2013	A Good Day: A Gift of Gratitude	Sterling Ethos

== Awards ==
Year	Award	Nominated work
2014	NASA Exploring Leadership Colloquium: Award of Honor	
2014	Jackson Hole Science Media Awards	IMMERSIVE IMAX 3D
2014	Dimension 3 Festival: Best 4K Film	
2014	NAPPC Pollinator Protector Award	
2013	AwareGuide Editor's Choice for Top Transformational Film of the Year	Wings of Life
2013	AwareGuide Inspiration Award	Wings of Life
2012	Best Theatrical Program at the Jackson Hole Science Media Awards	Wings of Life
2011	Wild Talk Africa Roscar Award	Wings of Life
2005	Movieguide Awards Best Film Documentary	America's Heart and Soul
2005	Movieguide Awards 10 Best Movies of 2004 for Families	America's Heart and Soul
2004	Top 70 Cinematographers, On Film Kodak Salute Series	
2001	Hallmark Entertainment Telly Awards	America!
1994	Clio	Public Service Earth Communications Office “The Power of One”
1994	Clio	Public Service Earth Communications Office “Connections”
1994	The Mobius Award	The Power of One
1992	Emmy nominated	Discovery Channel: Oceans of Air
1992	Telly Award	We’ll Amaze You
1990	Gold Promax Medallion	The Spirit of Hampton Roads
1989	International Monitor Award for Best Paint Film Design	“America" for Baskin-Robbins

Schwartzberg has won two Clio Awards for Best Environmental Public Service Spots, an Emmy nomination for Best Cinematography for the Discovery Channel special Oceans of Air, and the Heartland Film Festival's Truly Moving Picture Award for Walt Disney Pictures’ release, America’s Heart and Soul. Schwartzberg was recognized as one of the top 70 Cinematographers for the On Film Kodak Salute Series. He is a member of the Directors Guild of America and the Academy of Motion Pictures Arts and Sciences.
