= Murder Me, Monster =

2018 film by Alejandro Fadel

- Argentine theatrical release poster
- Spanish: Muere, monstruo, muere
- Directed by: Alejandro Fadel
- Written by: Alejandro Fadel
- Produced by: Agustina Llambi-Campbell; Alejandro Fadel; Fernando Brom; Julie Gayet; Antoun Sehnaoui; Nadia Turincev; Jean-Raymond Garcia; Benjamin Delaux; Édouard Lacoste; Dominga Sotomayor; Omar Zúñiga
- Starring: Víctor López; Esteban Bigliardi; Tania Casciani; Romina Iniesta; Sofía Palomino; Francisco Carrasco; Stéphane Rideau; Jorge Prado
- Cinematography: Julián Apezteguia; Manuel Rebella
- Edited by: Andrés P. Estrada
- Music by: Alex Nante
- Production companies: La Unión de los Ríos; Rouge International; Uproduction; Cinestación; Frutacine
- Distributed by: Maco Cine (Argentina); DCI Distribución (Chile); UFO Distribution (France)
- Release dates: 13 May 2018 (Cannes); 9 May 2019 (Argentina); 15 May 2019 (France); 29 October 2020 (Chile)
- Running time: 109 minutes
- Countries: Argentina; Chile; France
- Language: Spanish
- Box office: $11,759

Murder Me, Monster (Spanish: Muere, monstruo, muere, lit. ''Die, Monster, Die'') is a 2018 horror film written and directed by Alejandro Fadel. A co-production of Argentina, Chile and France, it had its world premiere in the Un Certain Regard section of the 2018 Cannes Film Festival. The film was released theatrically in Argentina on 9 May 2019 by Maco Cine and in France on 15 May 2019 by UFO Distribution, and on video on demand in Chile on 29 October 2020 by DCI Distribución.
