= Waltham (band) =

American rock band

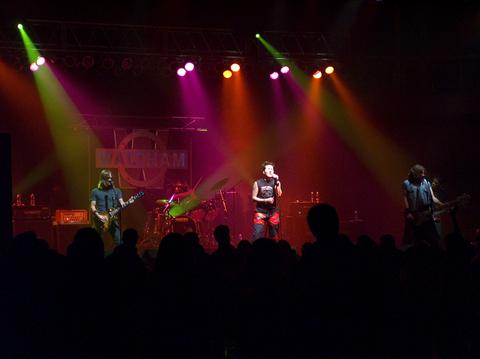
- Waltham the Band, circa 2000

Background information
- Origin: Waltham, Massachusetts, U.S.
- Genres: Rock, indie rock, pop rock
- Years active: 1999–present
- Label: Rykodisc
- Members: Dave Pino; Tony Monaco; Frank Pino, Jr. Darryl Grant; David "Jones" Illsley; Peet Golan
- Past members: Mikey Rorick; Alex Fiorentino; Craig Small; Dustin Hengst
- Website: Official website

Waltham is an American rock band that formed in 1999. The band takes its name from its hometown of Waltham, Massachusetts. The band is composed of Frank Pino, Jr. (lead vocals), Dave Pino (lead guitar and vocals), Tony Monaco (rhythm guitar), David "Jones" Illsley (bass and vocals) and Darryl Grant (drums and vocals).

== Biography ==
=== Formation and original lineup (1999–2001) ===
After years of performing hard rock in the Boston area under the moniker "Dirty Larry," Frank Pino, Jr., David Pino, Tony Monaco, David "Jones" Illsley, and Darryl Grant decided to abandon their previous direction and embrace their mutual love of early-80s pop rock, in the vein of Rick Springfield, Men at Work, and 38 Special. The band retired the "Dirty Larry" name and reinvented themselves under the name of the city in which they grew up...Waltham.

In a time when anthemic 80s rock was considered passe, Waltham found quick success in a Boston music scene that wasn't quite sure if the band was being ironic or sincere. Word of mouth from their initial small shows spread rapidly and the band was playing sold-out shows in larger venues within mere months. As the band's reputation as an outlier within the local scene grew, so did the crowds. An opening slot on local favorites The Sheila Devine's major-label debut CD release show (and subsequent positive press in The Boston Phoenix) further solidified the band's stature as a top Boston area attraction and made them reliable headliners in their own right.

In early-2000, the band began recording what was intended as their first album, enlisting famed Boston producer Ducky Carlisle to engineer and produce the band at his South Boston studio, Room 9 From Outer Space. During this period, the band received a 1999 Boston Music Award for Best New Band, despite not having released any recorded material to the public. Attention from multiple major labels soon followed and the band spent the second half of 2000 playing label showcases and securing industry management and legal representation.

By the end of 2000, however, disagreements over the business decisions of management led to the departure of drummer Darryl Grant (replaced briefly by Damone drummer Dustin Hengst), followed within a year by the departures of bassist David "Jones" Illsley and lead guitarist (and primary songwriter) David Pino.

=== 2002-2005 (Beginning of "Waltham 2.0" era) ===
Left with a decision of whether to disband or carry on, remaining members Frank Pino, Jr. and Tony Monaco chose to forge ahead and rebuild the band, hiring Peet Golan on bass/vocals, Craig Small on lead guitar/vocals, and Mikey Rorick on drums. The band rebounded quickly, writing a wealth of new material and releasing 2003's "Permission to Build" on Traktor 7 Records and taking home another Boston Music Award for Best Song (2003) for the single "So Lonely."

In 2004, the band appeared in the Disney film America's Heart and Soul, featuring a segment on the original lineup of the band (filmed in 2000).

=== 2005-2007 (Mainstream Exposure) ===
The band was signed by Rykodisc who issued their self-titled album in July 2005. In 2006, the band embarked upon their first international tour, traveling across eastern Europe as opener/direct support for 3 Doors Down.

Frank Pino, Jr. was featured on a 2006 episode of the MTV show Made.

On July 11, 2006, they released their first Extended Play entitled Awesome - EP.

After Rykodisc was acquired by Warner Brothers, the label did not carry over the deal that Waltham had signed with Ryko and withdrew support from the band. Shortly after, the band parted ways with Craig Small, who was replaced with incoming lead guitarist Alex Fiorentino.

By the end of 2007 and facing an uncertain future, Waltham went on hiatus.

Waltham's "Cheryl (Come and Take a Ride)" has been used in promotions for the CBS reality TV series, The Amazing Race.

=== 2009-present (Original Lineup reformation) ===
In late-2009, Waltham's original lineup (Frank Pino, Jr., David Pino, Monaco, Illsley, Grant) reunited for their first show in almost a decade, playing a New Year's Eve concert at Harper's Ferry in the Brighton neighborhood of Boston. This show also featured a hybrid version of the band's second incarnation, with Frank Pino, Jr., Tony Monaco, Peet Golan, and Alex Fiorentino being joined for a set by Unearth members Ken Susi on guitar and Derek Kerswill on drums.

Having received an extremely enthusiastic reaction to the original lineup's reformation, the band permanently returned to this lineup and played a series of shows over the next few years, including a 2012 acoustic set as support for Rick Springfield - a primary initial influence - at the House of Blues in Boston.

On February 14, 2013, on the official Waltham website and Facebook page, an iPhone text Lyric video was released revealing a new song "You're Everything That I Want", and that their third studio album Wicked Waltham was released on iTunes and Spotify in 2014, marking a 9-year gap between the release of their first and second studio albums. In July 2013, the band also revealed two more songs from the album, "The Highway" and "Drive Me Crazy". In September 2013, they released a fourth song from Wicked Waltham, Stand and Fight, which was written by Dave and Frank Pino, Jr.

On November 21, 2013, the music video for "Stand and Fight" was released. On April 28, 2014, the band released Wicked Waltham as a digital download and EP. They also announced that the album would be released on vinyl in June 2014. On May 7, 2014, Waltham released Still In Love as the final track for Wicked Waltham.

The band played sporadic concerts throughout the 2010s, before a six-year break that finally ended with a show in New Hampshire in 2025.

== Influences and sound ==
Their sound - a mix of melodic pop rock and hard rock riffs - has drawn comparisons to Cheap Trick and The Cars, with the band citing Rick Springfield as an influence.

== Discography ==
=== Studio albums ===
- Permission to Build (2003)
- Waltham (2005)

=== EPs ===
- Awesome - EP (2006)
- Wicked Waltham (2014)

== Side-projects and collaborations ==
- Frank Pino Jr. released an EP under the pseudonym USA! USA! USA! entitled Whats Your Name? on October 4, 2012.
- Frank also formed a group with Lauren Mangini called Lowercase Me.
- Frank Pino Jr. is featured on N Pa's concept album The Ghost Within: The Tale of Turmoil which was released on September 24, 2013.

== Awards ==
Boston Music Awards

- Best Rock/Pop Band (2005)
- Song of the Year (2003) for "So Lonely"
- Song of the year (200?) for "Cheryl"
- Best New Band (tie) (1999)

WBCN Rock & Roll Rumble

- Finalist (2000)

The Noise Poll

- Best New Band (1999)
