= Out Here All Night =

Studio album by Damone
- Released: May 23, 2006
- Genres: Pop punk, power pop, hard rock, glam metal
- Length: 42:52
- Label: Island

Damone chronology
From the Attic (2003)	Out Here All Night (2006)	Roll the Dice (2008)

Singles from Out Here All Night
- 1. "Out Here All Night" Released: 2006

Professional ratings
Review scores
Source	Rating
AllMusic	3.5/5 stars

Out Here All Night is the second album by rock band Damone. The title track has been featured in several video games, including Madden NFL 07, Tony Hawk's Downhill Jam, WWE Diva Search, and the Rock Band series as downloadable content. "What We Came Here For" appears in ATV Offroad Fury 4, and "Outta My Way" is on the soundtrack for the 2006 gymnastics movie Stick It.

== Track listing ==
All songs written by Mike Woods.

1. Now Is the Time
2. Out Here All Night
3. What We Came Here For
4. Stabbed in the Heart
5. On Your Speakers
6. Get Up and Go
7. Outta My Way
8. You're the One
9. New Change of Heart
10. When You Live
11. Tonight
12. Wasted Years (Iron Maiden cover)
13. Everybody Wants You (Billy Squier cover)

== Personnel ==
Damone

- Noelle LeBlanc – lead vocals, guitar
- Dustin Hengst – drums, backing vocals
- Michael Vazquez – bass guitar, backing vocals
- Mike Woods – lead guitar, backing vocals

Production

- Damone – producer
- David Spreng – producer, engineer, mixing for track 12, programming, additional talking on track 7
- Tom Lord-Alge – mixing for tracks 2, 3, 4, 7, 10, and 11
- Mike Shipley – mixing for tracks 1, 5, 6, 8, and 9
- Bob Ludwig – mastering
- Scott Gilman – orchestrations, mixing for track 12
- Mudrock – additional editing on track 2

Additional personnel

- Thicker Bradshall – additional backing vocals on track 6
- Michael Gill – additional talking on track 7
- Amanda Whitmore – additional talking on track 7
