= Return of the Hero =

2018 comedy film

- Film poster
- French: Le retour du héros
- Directed by: Laurent Tirard
- Written by: Laurent Tirard; Grégoire Vigneron
- Produced by: Marc Dujardin; Olivia Lagache
- Starring: Jean Dujardin; Mélanie Laurent
- Cinematography: Guillaume Schiffman
- Edited by: Yann Malcor
- Music by: Mathieu Lamboley
- Production companies: JD Prod les Films sur Mesure; StudioCanal; France 3 Cinéma; Nexus Factory; Umedia; GV Prod
- Distributed by: StudioCanal
- Release date: 14 February 2018
- Running time: 90 minutes
- Countries: France; Belgium
- Language: French
- Budget: $10.6 million
- Box office: $7.4 million

Return of the Hero (French: Le retour du héros) is a 2018 Franco-Belgian comedy film directed by Laurent Tirard and starring Jean Dujardin and Mélanie Laurent.

== Plot ==
In the Burgundy countryside during the Napoleonic Wars, Captain Neuville of the hussars gets engaged to Pauline Beaugrand, whose elder sister Élisabeth has quickly realised that the man is a liar and a fraud. Just before the wedding, Neuville gets orders to rejoin his unit advancing against Austria and rides away, promising to write every day. When no letters arrive, Pauline falls ill with worry and, to cheer her up, Élisabeth starts forging letters. Once the Austrian campaign is over, Élisabeth's letters say he has been posted to India where, as well as fighting the British, he is growing tobacco and raising elephants. Tiring of the subterfuge, Élisabeth writes that he is engaged in what may be his last battle and the letters stop. Pauline marries a shy neighbour, Nicolas, and has two children.

In town one day, Élisabeth is furious to see a stinking vagrant who is Neuville and, when he admits that he is a penniless deserter, gives him money to go away and stay away. In fact he uses the money to get cleaned up and, to her fury, pays a visit to Élisabeth's family. They are overjoyed to find that the gallant captain is still alive and are agog to hear his adventures. He reveals that he now has a diamond mine in India and is prepared to sell shares in the enterprise. Élisabeth is furious that he has taken over the story she invented and is now embellishing it to exploit her neighbours. As well as defrauding the local landowners, Neuville is working his way through their wives and starts an affair with Pauline. Élisabeth is furious and lets Nicolas know. He, being an excellent shot, challenges Neuville to a duel with pistols. When Pauline bursts in on the duel, Nicolas has to take her home, postponing the combat to Neuville's great relief.

An artillery regiment arrives in the area to stop a unit of marauding Cossacks and the general comes to lunch with Élisabeth's parents. Neuville is there and his tales of the war against the Austrians entrance the general, who is called away as the enemy approaches. In fact, the Russian cavalry are lining up to attack the Beaugard's house. Neuville tries to flee but, realising he will not get away alive, faces the charge alone with a rifle, bringing down several opponents. The charge ends abruptly when the artillery find their range and destroy the Russians, leaving Neuville a hero who is reinstated in his regiment. Élisabeth at last agrees to marry him, but the wedding is interrupted when the groom gets orders to rejoin his unit. He rides away, promising to write every day.

== Cast ==
- Jean Dujardin as Captain Charles-Grégoire Neuville
- Mélanie Laurent as Élisabeth Beaugrand
- Noémie Merlant as Pauline Beaugrand
- Christophe Montenez as Nicolas
- Evelyne Buyle as Madame Beaugrand
- Christian Bujeau as Monsieur Beaugrand
- Féodor Atkine as General Mortier-Duplessis
- Fabienne Galula as Eugénie
- Laurent Bateau as Monsieur Dunoyer
- Jean-Michel Lahmi as Monsieur Loiseau
- Aurélie Boquien as Madame Dunoyer
