= Guillaume Schiffman =

French cinematographer

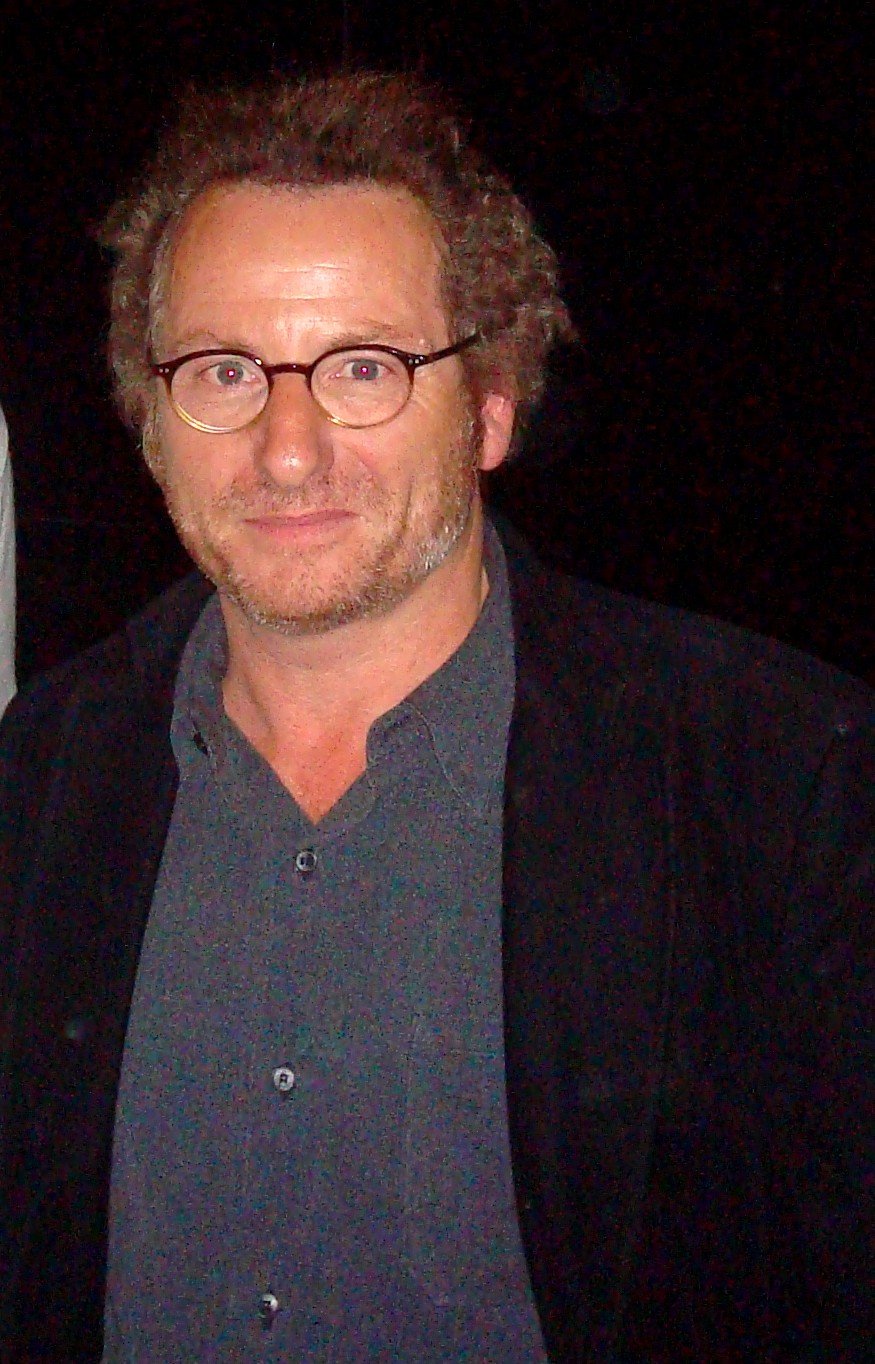
- Schiffman in 2011
- Born: France
- Occupation: Cinematographer
- Years active: 1970–present
- Partner: Emmanuelle Bercot
- Children: Nemo Schiffman
- Mother: Suzanne Schiffman

Guillaume Schiffman is a French cinematographer who is known for the films he has made with director Michel Hazanavicius, including OSS 117: Cairo, Nest of Spies in 2006 and OSS 117: Lost in Rio in 2009. Schiffman is particularly known for his work on The Artist with Hazanavicius. Schiffman shot The Artist in color and then monochromed it into black-and-white in the lab.

On 24 January 2012, Schiffman received his first ever Academy Award nomination for his work on the silent film, The Artist. Schiffman won the BAFTA Award for Best Cinematography in 2012 for The Artist. He was invited to join the Academy of Motion Picture Arts and Sciences in June 2012 along with 175 other individuals.

Guillaume Schiffman is the son of the late French screenwriter and film director, Suzanne Schiffman. His father was American.

== Filmography ==
Year	Title	Notes
1989	Comme d'habitude	Short film
1992	Les merisiers	
1994	Pas si grand que ça!	TV movie
1994	Le sourire	
1994	Le tapis brûle	Short film
1995	Arrêt d'urgence	TV movie
1995	Montana Blues	
1996	Bernie	
1996	L'@mour est à réinventer	TV mini-series
1997	Pardaillan	TV movie
1998	La loïe Fuller	Short film
1998	Class Trip	
1999	Chasseurs d'écume	TV mini-series
1999	Kennedy et moi	
2000	La tartine	Short film
2001	Les enquêtes d'Éloïse Rome	TV series
2001	Young Blades	
2001	Des anges	Short film
2002	La bande du drugstore	
2003	Brocéliande	
2003	Ambre a disparu	TV movie
2003	Quelqu'un vous aime...	Short film
2004	Anatomy of Hell	
2004	The Great Role	
2004	The Red Notebook	Short film
2004	93, rue Lauriston	TV movie
2005	Chok-Dee	
2005	Belzec	Documentary
2006	OSS 117: Cairo, Nest of Spies	Nominated—César Award for Best Cinematography
2006	Les ambitieux	
2007	Regarde-moi	
2007	Lady Bar	TV movie
2007	Un certain regard	Short film
2008	A Simple Heart	
2009	OSS 117: Lost in Rio	
2009	Une dernière cigarette	Short film
2010	Gainsbourg: A Heroic Life	Nominated—César Award for Best Cinematography
2010	The Counsel	
2010	Toi, moi, les autres	
2011	Chez Gino	
2011	The Artist	BAFTA Award for Best Cinematography; César Award for Best Cinematography; Independent Spirit Award for Best Cinematography; Nominated—Academy Award for Best Cinematography; Nominated—European Film Award for Best Cinematographer
2011	La collection - Écrire pour... 5 fois Nathalie Baye	TV series
2012	The Players	
2012	Populaire	Nominated—César Award for Best Cinematography
2013	On My Way	
2013	Turning Tide	
2014	Une histoire banale	
2014	The Search	
2015	Standing Tall	
2015	Jailbirds	
2016	Amis publics	
2016	150 Milligrams	
2018	Return of the Hero	
2019	The Translators	
2019	The Best Is Yet to Come	
2025	Once Upon My Mother (Ma mère, Dieu et Sylvie Vartan)	
