= Julie Gayet =

French actress and film producer (born 1972)

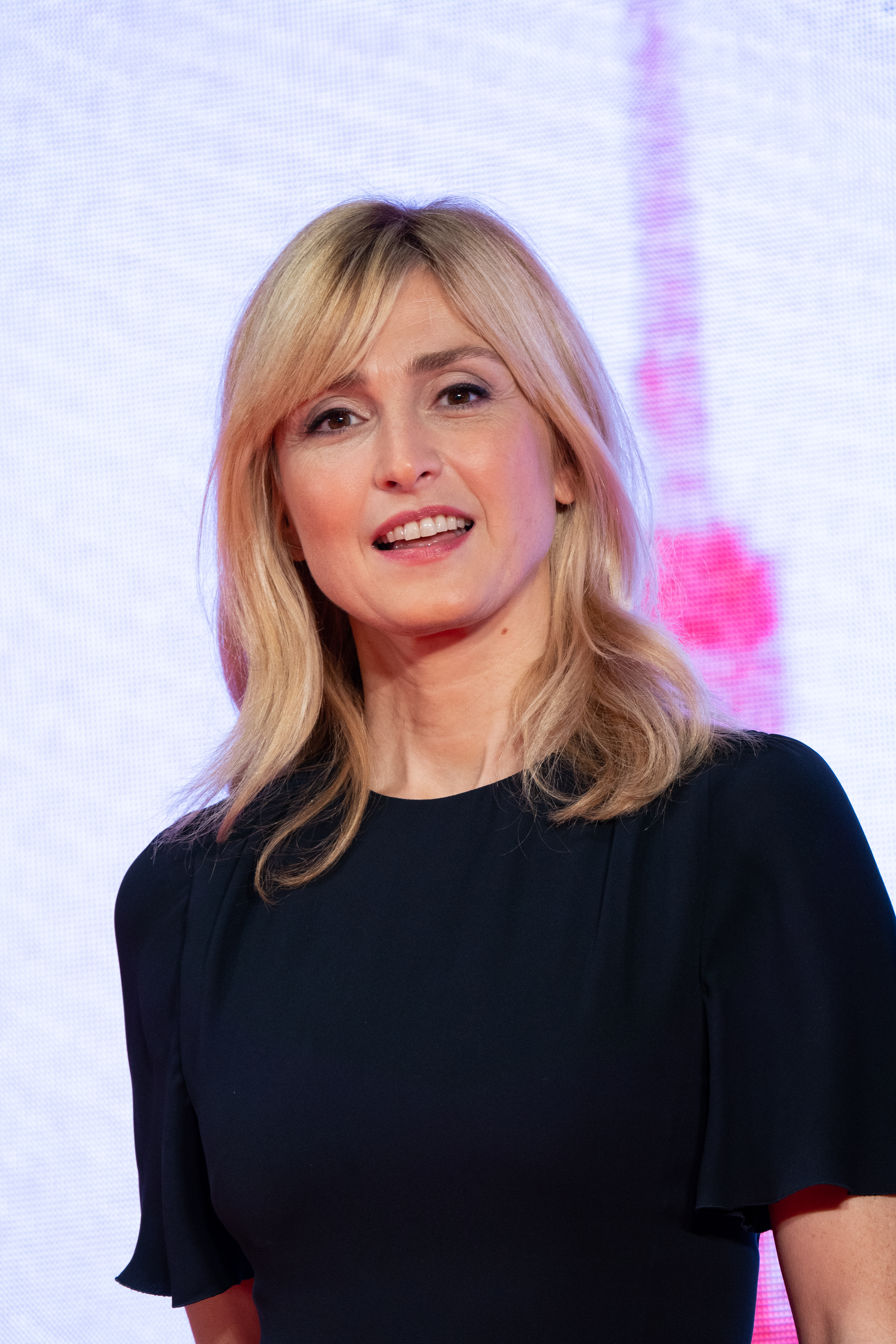
- Gayet in 2019
- Born: 3 June 1972 (age 54); Suresnes, France
- Occupations: Actress, film producer
- Spouse(s): Santiago Amigorena (m. 2003; div. 2006) François Hollande (m. 2022)
- Children: 2
- Awards: 1997 Prix Romy Schneider

Julie Gayet (pronounced [ʒyli ɡajɛ]; born 3 June 1972) is a French actress and film producer. She is married to the former President of France, François Hollande.

== Early life and education ==
Gayet was born in Suresnes, Hauts-de-Seine, where her father Brice Gayet is a professor and head of gastric surgery at the Institut Mutualiste Montsouris. He was former head of the clinic to the Lariboisière Hospital and lecturer at the Faculty Xavier Bichat at Paris Diderot University. Her mother is an antique dealer. Her paternal grandfather, Alain Gayet, was also a surgeon and became a Compagnon de la Libération after World War II. She received a social liberal intellectual upbringing.

Gayet studied art history and psychology at university, circus skills at the circus school of the Fratellini family, and operatic singing under Tosca Marmor. At the age of 17, she studied at the Actors Studio in London with Jack Waltzer, and then continued at the Tania Balachova School in Paris.

== Career ==
=== Acting ===
Gayet made her acting debut in a 1992 episode of the French TV series Premiers baisers, and had her first film role as an extra in Three Colors: Blue (1993). Her first role of public note was in the 1996 comedy Delphine 1, Yvan 0 by Dominique Farrugia.

=== Singing ===
Her musical performances include playing in video-clips for Benjamin Biolay and singing a duet with Marc Lavoine.

=== Film production ===
In 2007, she founded her own production company, Rouge International, with Nadia Turincev and produced films such as The Ride by Stephanie Gillard, Fix me by Palestinian Raed Andonia and Bonsai by Cristian Jimenez of Chile.

=== Film directing ===
In 2013, Gayet co-directed with Mathieu Busson the documentary Cinéast(e)s featuring 20 French female film directors.

=== Other ===
Gayet appeared on the cover of the 17 January 2014 issue of the French Elle magazine. The issue hit newsstands on 15 January 2014, two days ahead of its usual release day. The headline read "Julie Gayet, Actress and Committed Woman, a French Passion".

== Personal life ==
In 2003, Gayet married Argentine author and screenwriter Santiago Amigorena, but they divorced in 2006. The couple have two children.

Gayet is a centre-left activist, having appeared in a video supporting François Hollande during the 2012 French presidential election. She is a member of the Support Committee of the PS candidate for the 2014 Paris mayoral election, Anne Hidalgo. She also supported same-sex marriage in France.

In 2013 rumours started circulating that Gayet was in a secret relationship with Hollande. On 10 January 2014, a story in the tabloid Closer featured seven pages of alleged revelations and photos about the affair, provoking wider media coverage. Hollande said he "regretted this violation of his private life" and was "thinking about" pursuing a legal response, but did not deny the substance of the story. The 10 January issue was so popular that Closer "reprinted the issue, with a further 150,000 copies scheduled to hit newsstands" on 15 January 2014. On 16 January 2014, the AFP news agency reported that Gayet would sue Closer for €50,000 in damages and €4,000 in legal costs.

On 27 March 2014, a French court ordered Closer magazine to pay Gayet €15,000 ($20,700) for publishing the photos that revealed an affair between her and President Hollande. In November 2014, she was photographed with Hollande at the Élysée Palace gardens; it was revealed that her affair with Hollande was ongoing and that she was spending at least four nights a week with him there.

Gayet married Hollande on 4 June 2022 in Tulle.

In October 2022, she was appointed to the supervisory board of French professional rugby union club CA Brive.

Gayet is of French as well as distant Polish, German, Maltese, and Corsican Italian descent.

== Awards ==
- 1997: Prix Romy Schneider for her role in Sélect Hôtel.
- 1997: Best European Actress for Sélect Hôtel, Brussels International Film Festival.
- 2009: Best Actress at the Tokyo International Film Festival for 8 fois debout

== Filmography ==
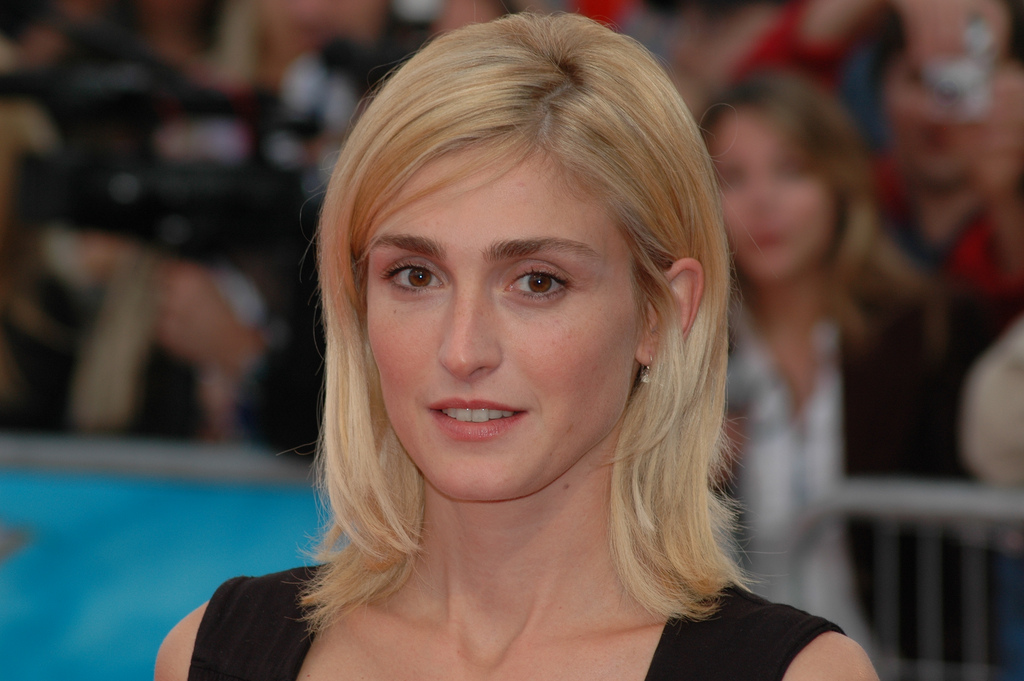
Julie Gayet attending the 2007 Festival of American Cinema at Deauville.

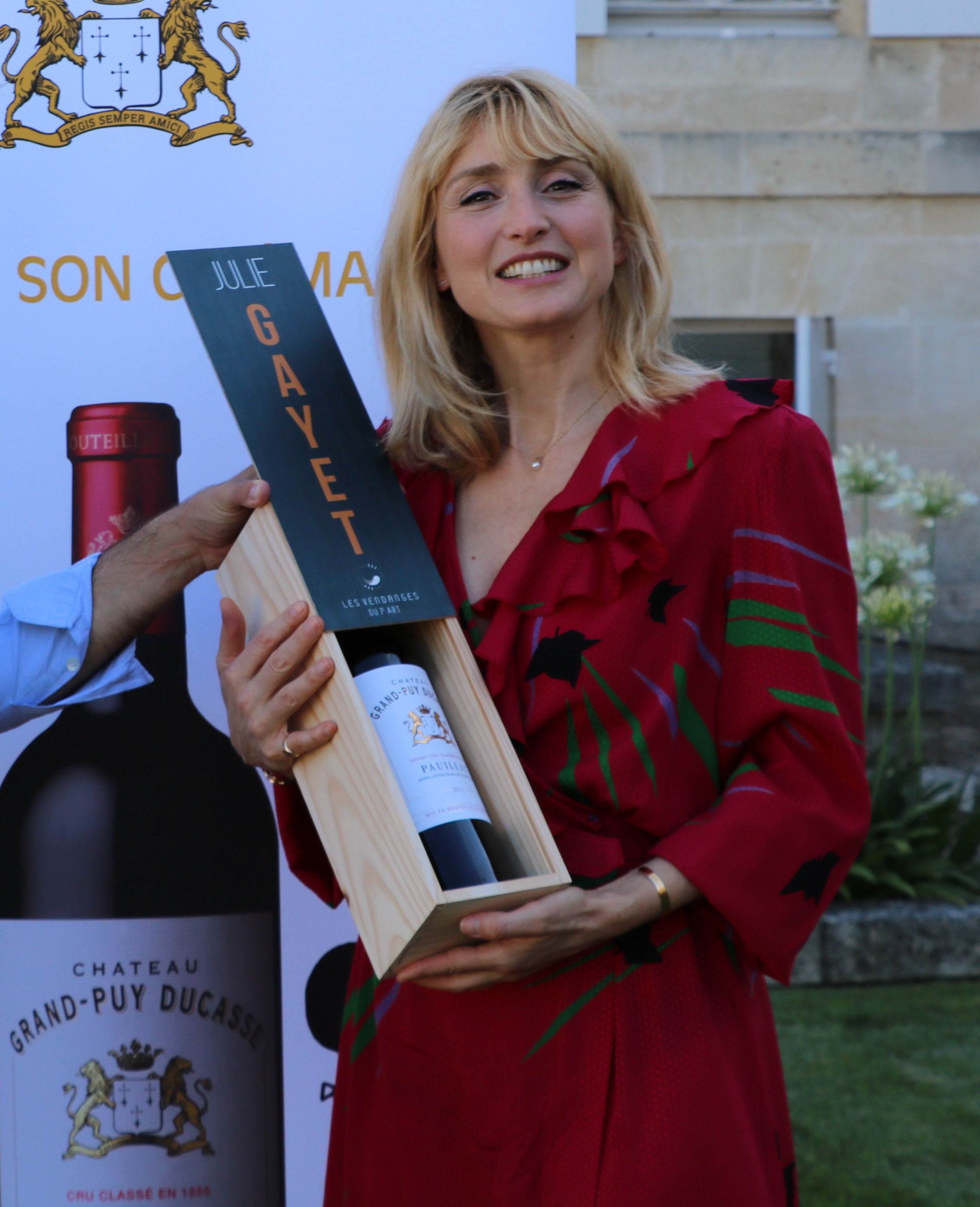
Julie Gayet attending the 2019 International Film Festival at Pauillac.

=== Film ===
Year	Title	Role	Notes
1993	Three Colors: Blue	Extra	
1993	The Little Apocalypse		
1993	À la belle étoile	Hannah	
1994	3000 scénarios contre un virus		
1994	L'Histoire du garçon qui voulait qu'on l'embrasse	A girl in the metro	
1995	One Hundred and One Nights	Camille Miralis	
1996	Sélect Hôtel	Nathalie	Prix Romy Schneider; Best European Actress Brussels International Film Festival.
1996	Delphine 1, Yvan 0	Delphine Saban	
1996	Les Deux Papas et la Maman	Sophie	
1996	The Liars	Lisa	
1998	Sentimental Education	Clare	
1998	Ça ne se refuse pas	Marlène Kardelian	
1998	Le Plaisir (et ses petits tracas)	Véra	
1999	Paddy	Paddy	
1999	Why Not Me?	Eva	
2000	La Confusion des Genres	Babette	
2000	Les Gens qui s'aiment	Winnie	
2000	Nag la bombe	Rosine, la serveuse	
2001	Vertiges de l'amour	Jeanne	
2002	Après la pluie, le beau temps	Rose Bonbon	
2002	Novo	Julie	
2002	Un monde presque paisible	Mme Andrée	
2002	Chaos and Desire	Catherine	
2002	Ma Caméra et moi	Lucie	
2003	Lovely Rita, sainte patronne des cas désespérés	Rita	
2004	Ce qu'ils imaginent	Sarah	
2004	Clara et moi	Clara	
2005	Camping à la ferme	The judge	
2005	Bab el web	Laurence	
2006	A Woman in Winter	Caroline	
2006	Le Lièvre de Vatanen	Olga	
2006	My Best Friend	Catherine	
2006	De particulier à particulier	Sophie	
2007	Shall We Kiss?	Émilie	
2007	Les Fourmis rouges	Anne	
2008	Childhoods	mother of Fritz Lang	
2009	8 fois debout	Elsa	Best Actress – Tokyo International Film Festival
2009	Eleanor's Secret	Mom (voice)	
2010	Sans laisser de traces	Clémence	
2010	Pièce montée	Laurence	
2010	L'Apprenti Père Noël		
2011	L'Art de séduire	Hélène	
2011	The Shape of Art to Come		
2011	Carré blanc	Marie	
2011	Practical Guide to Belgrade with Singing and Crying	Sylvie	
2012	After	Julie	
2012	Au cas où je n'aurais pas la palme d'or	Julia	
2012	Nos plus belles vacances	Isabelle	
2013	Les Âmes de papier	Emma	
2013	Quai d'Orsay	Valérie Dumontheil	
2013	Another House (L'autre maison)	Charlotte	
2015	Jailbirds	Nadège Rutter	
2016	We Are Family	Sophie	
2018	Love Addict	Martha	
2019	C'est quoi cette Mamie?!	Sophie	
2021	C'est quoi cette Pappy?!	Sophie	
2023	Comme une actrice	Anna	

=== Television ===
Year	Title	Role	Notes
1992	Premiers baisers		TV series, one episode
1994	Ferbac		TV series, one episode
1994	La Vie de Marianne	Mademoiselle de Fare	
1997	Maître Da Costa		TV series, one episode
2001	Sang d'encre	Monica	
2004	Bien agités !	Diane	
2004	3 garçons, 1 fille, 2 mariages	Camille	
2005	Les Rois maudits	Isabelle de France	Miniseries
2006	Le Rainbow Warrior	Dominique Prieur	
2007	La Légende des trois clefs	Béatrice Sancier	
2007	Elles et Moi	Florence de Montellier	
2010	Famille décomposée	Doris	
2010	Clandestin	Sophie	
2011	V comme Vian	Michelle Vian	
2011	Amoureuse	Iona Gorrigan	
2011	J'étais à Nüremberg	Marie-Claude Vaillant-Couturier	
2012	Emma	Irène	
2013	Odysseus	Helen of Troy	
2013	Alias Caracalla	Madame Moret	
2014	Ça va passer... Mais quand ?	Sophie	
2015	Call My Agent!	Herself	TV series (1 episode)
2019	Soupçons (Torn)	Victoire	TV series (6 episodes)
2021	Une mère parfaite	Helene Berg	TV series (4 episodes)
2022	Disparition inquiétante	Gabrielle Perez	TV series (1 Episode)
2023	Les Mystères de la marée	Emilie Lagne	TV series
2024	Olympe, une femme dans la Révolution	Olympe de Gouges	TV series
2026	Mr. Trillion: The Dynamic Man	Kelly Gentiloni	TV series

=== Short films ===
Year	Title	Role	Notes
1996	Sans transition		
1996	Vive le cinéma !		
1996	15 sans billets		
1997	Pédagogie		
1997	Play		
1998	Je ne veux pas être sage		
1998	Baby Blues		
2003	Rêver		
2006	Un secret derrière la porte		
2007	Fin		
2009	Le Petit Homme bleu		
2009	Une dernière cigarette		
2009	De plaisir		

=== As director ===
Year	Title	Role	Notes
2013	Cinéast(e)s		Co-directed with Mathieu Busson

=== As producer ===
Year	Title	Notes
2009	8 fois debout	
2009	Fix ME	
2010	Dowaha	Co-producer
2011	Bonsai	
2013	A Spell to Ward Off the Darkness	
2015	The Boss's Daughter	
2015	Jailbirds	
2016	The Ride	
2018	Murder Me, Monster	

=== Videoclips ===
Year	Title	Notes
2007	Laisse aboyer les chiens	For Benjamin Biolay
2007	Dans la Merco Benz	For Benjamin Biolay
2007	Qu'est-ce que ça peut faire ?	For Benjamin Biolay

== Songs ==
- Duet with Marc Lavoine on the song Avec toi from the album Je descends du singe (2012).
