= De plus belle =

- Directed by: Anne-Gaëlle Daval
- Starring: Florence Foresti; Mathieu Kassovitz
- Release date: 8 March 2017
- Running time: 98 minutes
- Country: France
- Language: French
- Budget: $6.2 million
- Box office: $549,000

De plus belle is a 2017 French film directed by Anne-Gaëlle Daval. A romantic comedy starring Florence Foresti and Mathieu Kassovitz, it tells the story of a breast cancer survivor's efforts to rebuild her life. It received mixed reviews from critics.

== Summary ==
Lucie Larcher, a breast cancer survivor and single mother, learns how to rebuild her life. She meets Clovis, her new lover, in a nightclub, and takes dancing lessons with her teacher Dalida. She brings up her daughter and takes constructive criticisms from her mother.

== Cast ==
- Florence Foresti as Lucie Larchet
- Mathieu Kassovitz as Clovis
- Nicole Garcia as Dalila
- Jonathan Cohen as Frédéric
- Olivia Bonamy as Manon
- Josée Drevon as Yvonne
- Jeanne Astier as Hortense
- Norbert Ferrer as Ben
- Perrette Souplex as Salomé
- Sabine Pakora as Sabine

== Reception ==
The film received mixed reviews from critics. On review aggregator website Rotten Tomatoes, the film holds an approval rating of 88% based on 8 reviews, and an average rating of 5.33/10.

In a review for Le Monde, Thomas Sotinel suggested the film was conventional for French romantic comedies, with an expected happy ending. Le Parisien praised Kassovitz and Foresti's acting, calling Foresti's "magical". They concluded, "everything is strong, everything is sharp, everything is intense" in this film.

Reviewing it for L'Express, Laurent Dijan said the film was slow-paced and embarrassing. Nevertheless, he praised Jonathan Cohen's acting. While Sylvestre Picard of Premiere was similarly laudatory of Cohen's acting, he deplored the profusion of sub-themes in the script.
