= Florence Foresti =

French comedian and actress

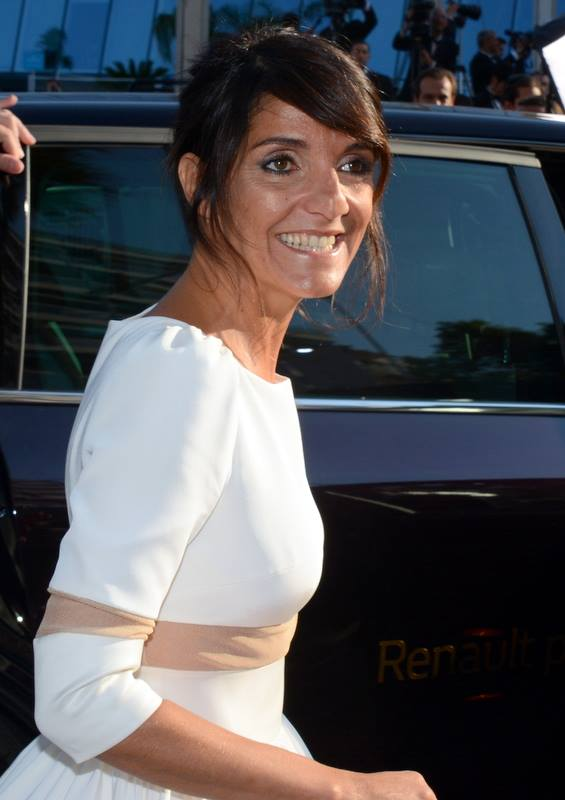
- Florence Foresti at the 2015 Cannes Film Festival
- Born: 8 November 1973 (age 53); Vénissieux, France
- Occupations: Comedian, actress
- Partner(s): Julien Mairesse (2006-2010); Xavier Maingon (2011-2022); Alexandre Kominek (since 2022)
- Children: 1

Florence Foresti (French pronunciation: [flɔʁɑ̃s fɔʁɛsti]; born 8 November 1973) is a French comedian and actress.

== Life and career ==
Following her high school studies in literature, theatre and dramatic expression at Saint-Just de Lyon, Florence Foresti entered a school for cinematography at Lyon. After her studies, she appeared in the French television show Thalassa.

At 20, Florence enrolled in a course in classical theatre at Lyon, which she quit after just two days. She had a few other jobs, including working for EDF in Lyon, before finally becoming a computer graphics artist. But she didn't give up on her artistic ambitions, and in 1998 made her debut at the café-théâtre Le nOmbril du mOnde ("The navel of the world") as part of an all-woman trio Les Taupes Models (a pun between the French "Model Moles" and English "Top Models") with Céline Ianucci and Cécile Giroud, while simultaneously working as a computer graphics artist. The trio was noticed while touring, and Anne Roumanoff proposed making the act the first part of her show. Florence Foresti's career was launched.

In 2001 her first one-woman show, Manquerait plus qu'elle soit drôle ("The only thing missing is that she be funny") won the Jury prize at the Antibes festival. Her style bears comparison with that of Muriel Robin and Sylvie Joly, as well as with some of the 'attitude' and voices of Dieudonné and Élie Semoun. She appeared in the Stéphane Bern programme 20h 10 pétantes, and then on Laurent Ruquier's On a tout essayé, playing zany characters.

In 2005 she starts her second one-woman show, Florence Foresti fait des sketchs ("Florence Foresti Makes sketches").

In July 2007, she gave birth to her daughter, Toni . In the wake, she plays in a play L'Abribus with Philippe Elno.

From May 2009 to April 2011 she staged her show MotherFucker. She explained the Anglo-Saxon directness of the title in an interview with Paris Match: "I asked myself, can one remain a woman while still being a full-time mother? This question affected me so much that I dubbed my show MotherFucker. And it's a nod to Madonna, my idol. After the birth of her daughter, Lourdes, she appeared in a T-shirt with the word Mother on the front, Fucker on the back. It's so clever, this way of playing with her image, her private life, and her playing with words. I stole this."

From 13 to 23 September 2012, the "Foresti Party" began. There were three dates in Lyon ("Foresti Party Lyon"), and five in Paris ("Foresti Party Bercy").

On 26 February 2016, she hosted the 41st César Awards. She returned to host the 45th César Awards on 28 February 2020.

== Filmography ==
Year	Title	Role	Director	Notes
2006	Dikkenek	Laurence	Olivier Van Hoofstadt	
2006	The Ant Bully	Kreela	John A. Davis	French voice
2007	Game of Four	Brigitte	Bruno Dega	
2007	Si c'était lui...	Roseline	Anne-Marie Étienne	Nominated – RAIMU Award for The Best Supporting Actress
2008	Mes amis, mes amours	Sophie	Lorraine Lévye	
2009	King Guillaume	Magali Brunel	Pierre-François Martin-Laval	
2011	Hollywoo	Jeanne Rinaldi	Frédéric Berthe & Pascal Serieis	
2012	Bref	Herself	Kyan Khojandi	TV series (1 episode)
2013	Paris à tout prix	Gigi	Reem Kherici	
2014	Barbecue	Olivia	Éric Lavaine	
2014	Asterix: The Land of the Gods	Bonemine	Alexandre Astier & Louis Clichy	Voice over
2015	The Little Prince	The Mother	Mark Osborne	Voice over
2016	À fond	Captain Peton	Nicolas Benamou	
2016	La folle histoire de Max et Léon	A resistant	Jonathan Barré	
2017	De plus belle	Lucie Larcher	Anne-Gaëlle Daval	
2020	Lucky	Caroline Jamar	Olivier Van Hoofstadt	
2020	Le Bonheur des uns...	Karine Léger	Daniel Cohen	
