= Jailbirds (2015 film) =

- Theatrical release poster
- La Taularde
- Directed by: Audrey Estrougo
- Written by: Audrey Estrougo; Agnès Caffin
- Produced by: Julie Gayet; Nadia Turincev; Clément Calvet; Jérémie Fajner
- Starring: Sophie Marceau
- Cinematography: Guillaume Schiffman
- Edited by: Céline Cloarec
- Production companies: Rouge International; Superprod Films
- Distributed by: Rezo Films
- Release dates: 3 October 2015 (Busan); 14 September 2016 (France & Belgium)
- Running time: 100 minutes
- Countries: France; Belgium
- Language: French
- Budget: $3 million
- Box office: $1.3 million

Jailbirds (French: La Taularde) is a 2015 French-Belgian drama film written and directed by Audrey Estrougo and starring Sophie Marceau.

== Plot ==
When her husband, a career criminal, is arrested and faces maybe ten years in jail, Mathilde smuggles him a gun which he uses to escape. She is caught, and faces maybe two years in prison, while he is on the run as a wanted man facing further charges. Life locked up awaiting trial is tough and Mathilde, without any clue where her husband has got to, starts crumbling under the strain. When a prisoner is knifed and uproar breaks out, she picks up the knife and threatens a guard. Disarmed, she faces a further charge and is told with relish by the chief warder that her husband has been found dead in the boot of a car.

== Cast ==
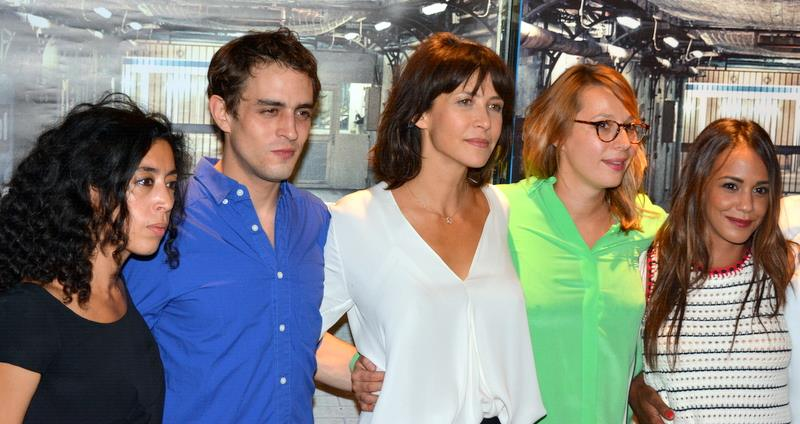
Naidra Ayadi, Benjamin Siksou, Sophie Marceau, Audrey Estrougo and Alice Belaïdi at the film's premiere in Paris.

- Sophie Marceau as Mathilde Leroy
- Suzanne Clément as Anita Lopes
- Anne Le Ny as Marthe Brunet
- Eye Haïdara as Nato Kanté
- Marie-Sohna Condé as Elise Schoeicher
- Carole Franck as Babette
- Marie Denarnaud as Léa
- Naidra Ayadi as Robocop
- Anne Coesens as Noémie
- Pauline Burlet as Jeanne
- Nailia Harzoune as Linda Plancher
- Aurore Broutin as Safia Dakro
- Alice Belaïdi as Samira Belhadj
- Benjamin Siksou as Adrien Leroy
- Julie Gayet as Nadège Rutter
- Nicolas Gob as Marcus
