= Stephanie Gillard =

French documentary filmmaker

- Born: 24 October 1973 (age 52); Paris
- Occupations: Filmmaker, Editor, Writer

Stephanie Gillard (born 1973, in Paris) is a French documentary filmmaker, writer and editor. Her documentary The Ride, about the annual 300-mile journey through the South Dakota Badlands where young Lakota Sioux ride horseback, was praised by reviewers. The Squad, about the Olympique Lyonnais women’s football team, was very well received by critics too.

== Life ==
Stephanie Gillard was born in Paris. After studying law, Stephanie Gillard worked as an assistant director (films à lou), then as a programming assistant (radio FG)and as an assistant producer (agat films ex nihilo).

== The Ride ==
Filmed in winter 2011 and produced by Julie Gayet's production company : Rouge International : The Ride takes audiences on the annual Chief Big Foot Memorial Ride that retraces the Lakotas' history. After the defeat of General Custer at Little Big Horn and the surrender and execution of Chief Sitting Bull, the Lakota Sioux fled through South Dakota, joined by Chief Big Foot's people and chased by the US Cavalry. In December 1890, at Wounded Knee, the massacre of hundreds of unarmed Lakota took place.

== The Squad ==
"In my opinion, people are not interested in women’s football because they don't know the players. If you want to be a fan, you have to be able to identify yourself as champions. Even if they win all the titles, if you don't know the personalities, it doesn't work. With The Squad, I wanted to invite viewers to discover a female team. The idea was to enter the heart of a team, meeting outstanding professional players."

— France Bleu, Emission de Radio

The Squad (Les Joueuses, in French), also produced by Julie Gayet, deals with the Olympique Lyonnais women’s football team.

The documentary is a critical success :

In Les Cahiers du Cinéma Raphael Nieuwjaer says : "Without forgetting the junction between generations and status, transmission being its principal aim (...), The Players never forgets that sport is a matter of gestures, a mix of physical tact and contact with the ball, on the pitch, with the other players."

Jacques Morice, in Télérama, states "The different players explain their personal history, their wish to pass on their passion to the next generations, their victories and their difficulties. But it is maybe in the way to capture the beauty and the brutality of this sport, and to capture the different contacts and movements, that Stéphanie Gillard "scores the most".

Le Bleu du Miroir comments :"Stéphanie Gillard, whose previous documentary (The Ride in 2018) we already appreciated, chose a completely different context, a different group, softly but in an ingeniously political way, without losing the same attention (with very beautiful pictures from Jean-Marc Bouzou)."

In Hollywood Reporter, Jordan Mintzer writes : "A necessary addition to the sports doc genre."

== Work and achievements ==
- Citizen B (2025) co-directed with Emmanuel Manzano
- The Squad (2020)
- The Ride (2018)
- Lames ultramarines (2016)
- Les petits princes des sables (2009)
- Une histoire de ballon (2006)
