= Marie Denarnaud =

French actress

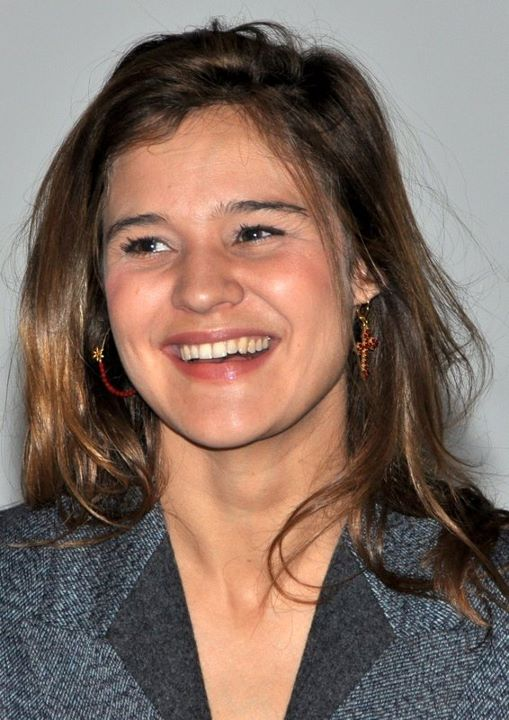
- Marie Denardaud in 2011
- Born: 30 August 1978; France
- Occupation: Actress
- Years active: 2000–present

Marie Denarnaud (born 1978) is a French actress. She has appeared in numerous films including Chaos (2001), Eager Bodies (2003), The Adopted (2011) and Une histoire banale (2014). She has also participated in the made-for-television film Nuit noire, 17 octobre 1961 (2005) which chronicled the events of the Paris massacre of 1961.

== Filmography ==
Year	Title	Role	Notes
2000	T'aime	Marie Gontier	
2001	Madame le proviseur	Hanna	
2001	My Wife Is an Actress	Colette	
2001	Chaos	Charlotte	
2001	Le Marathon du lit	Patricia	Telefilm
2001	L'Apprentissage de la Ville	Prisca	Telefilm
2003	Eager Bodies	Ninon	
2004	Ça fait mal à mon coeur	Géraldine	Short film
2004	Hollywood malgré lui	Réjane	Short film
2004	Penn sardines	Fine	Telefilm
2004	Nuit noire	Fanny	
2002—2004	Sœur Thérèse.com	Sœur Clémence	TV series
2005	Une vie	Rosalie	Telefilm
2005	Akoibon	Betsy	
2005	Le Mystère Alexia	Annette	Telefilm
2005	Papa	La serveuse costumée en alsacienne	
2005	October 17, 1961	Isabelle Martin	Telefilm
2005	Lucile et le petit prince	Lucile	Telefilm
2005	Foon	Une étudiante	
2006	Le Jour de ma mort		Short film
2007	Chez Maupassant	Caroline Donnet	TV series
2007	In Your Wake	Elena	
2007	Le Réveillon des bonnes	Élisabeth Sevran-Chabot	TV mini-series
2007	Affection	Lise	Short film
2008	Rivals	Nathalie	
2008	Les Vacances de Clémence	Josyane	Telefilm
2008	Bébé	Elle	Short film
2007—2008	Merci, les enfants vont bien!	Isis	TV series
2008	Kingdom of Felony	Gertrude	Telefilm
2009	The Queen and the Cardinal	Marie Mancini (voice)	Telefilm
2009	La Librairie de Schrödinger	La jeune femme	Short film
2009	Le Commissariat	Germaine Louveau	Telefilm
2010	Dancing Forever	Rose	Telefilm
2010	Les Vivants et les morts	Dallas	TV series
2010	Tremblay-en-France	Claire Krapazinski	Short film
2010	L'Essentiel féminin	The Actress	Short film
2011	Les Petits Meurtres d'Agatha Christie	Célie	TV series
2011	La Vie en miettes	Lucie et Chloé	Telefilm
2011	The Adopted	Marine	
2012	Les Cinq parties du monde	Maggie	Telefilm
2012	Ouf	La copine d'Anna	
2012	Naked Soles	Juliette	Short film
2013	Le Grand Georges	Henriette Guingouin	Telefilm
2013	Tant qu'il y aura des hommes!	Girl#1	Short film
2013	Captif	Alice	Short film
2013	Animal sérénade	Nina	Short film
2013	La Mort ne raconte pas d'histoires	Ccile	Short film
2014	Une histoire banale	Nathalie	
2014	L'Esprit de famille	Hélène Perez	Telefilm
2014	Breathe	Marie	
2014	En avant calme et droit	Barbara	Short film
2014	Couvre-feu	Valentine	Telefilm
2014	Toi que j'aimais tant	Lisa	Telefilm
2015	Malaterra	Sabrina Sahnoune	TV mini-series
2015	Mystère à la Tour Eiffel	Louise Massart	Telefilm
2015	Jailbirds	Léa	
2016	Marie Curie: The Courage of Knowledge	Jeanne Langevin	
2017	Plonger		
2018	Treat Me Like Fire	Sandra	
2021	HIP - High Intellectual Potential	Celine Hazan	TV mini-series
