= Dikkenek =

2006 Franco-Belgian film

- Theatrical release poster
- Directed by: Olivier Van Hoofstadt
- Written by: Olivier Van Hoofstadt
- Starring: Jean-Luc Couchard; Dominique Pinon; Marion Cotillard; Mélanie Laurent; Jérémie Renier; Catherine Jacob; Florence Foresti; François Damiens
- Release date: 21 June 2006
- Running time: 84 minutes
- Countries: France; Belgium
- Language: French
- Budget: $4.4 million
- Box office: $845.000

Dikkenek is a 2006 Franco-Belgian comedy film directed by Olivier Van Hoofstadt. It has attained cult status in France and Belgium because of its Belgian-type humor. It follows the life of different characters for a few days under the pretense of Stef & J.C. looking for the love of Stef's life. The title Dikkenek comes from the Flemish words dikke and nek verbatim for 'fat' + 'neck' and figuratively means an arrogant boaster.

== Cast ==
- Jean-Luc Couchard - Jean-Claude
- Dominique Pinon - Stef
- Marion Cotillard - Nadine
- Mélanie Laurent - Natacha
- Jérémie Renier - Greg
- Catherine Jacob - Sylvie
- Florence Foresti - Laurence
- François Damiens - Claudy
- Marie Kremer - Fabienne
- Catherine Hosmalin - Mich's wife
