= From the Attic =

Studio album by Damone
- Released: April 1, 2003
- Genre: Pop punk, power pop, hard rock, pop rock, alternative rock
- Label: RCA
- Producer: Ducky Carlisle, Adam Rourke

Damone chronology
From the Attic (2003)	Out Here All Night (2006)

Professional ratings
Review scores
Source	Rating
Allmusic	3/5 stars

From the Attic is the major label debut of rock band Damone. This album is currently only available from digital outlets such as iTunes.

== Track listing ==
All songs written by David Pino.

1. Frustrated Unnoticed
2. Your Girlfriends
3. Up to You
4. Feel Bad Vibe
5. Overchay with Me
6. On My Mind
7. Carwash Romance
8. Driveway Blues
9. At the Mall
10. You and I
11. Leave Me Alone

== Personnel ==
- Dustin Hengst - Drums
- Noelle Leblanc - Lead vocals, rhythm guitar
- David J. Pino - Lead guitar
- Vazquez - Bass, backing vocals
- Ducky Carlisle - Producer, engineer
- Adam Rourke - Producer, engineer
- Rob Gil - Assistant engineer
- Jim Foster - Additional engineering
- Tom Lord-Alge - Mixer
- Femio Hernandez - Assistant Mixer
