= The Adopted =

2011 film directed by Mélanie Laurent

- Film poster
- French: Les adoptés
- Directed by: Mélanie Laurent
- Written by: Mélanie Laurent; Morgan Perez; Christophe Deslandes
- Produced by: Bruno Levy
- Starring: Marie Denarnaud; Denis Ménochet; Mélanie Laurent; Clémentine Célarié
- Cinematography: Arnaud Potier
- Edited by: Guerric Catala
- Music by: Jonathan Morali
- Production companies: Move Movie; StudioCanal; TF1 Films Production; Rhône-Alpes Cinéma
- Distributed by: StudioCanal
- Release date: 23 November 2011
- Running time: 100 minutes
- Country: France
- Language: French
- Budget: $4 million
- Box office: $2.5 million

The Adopted (French: Les adoptés) is a 2011 French drama film directed and co-written by Mélanie Laurent. It stars Marie Denarnaud, Denis Ménochet, Laurent and Clémentine Célarié. Denis Ménochet won a Lumière Award for Most Promising Actor for his performance in the film.

== Cast ==
- Marie Denarnaud as Marine
- Denis Ménochet as Alex
- Clémentine Célarié as Millie
- Mélanie Laurent as Lisa
- Audrey Lamy as Clémence
- Théodore Maquet-Foucher as Léo
- Morgan Perez as Philippe
