= America's Heart and Soul =

- Theatrical release poster
- Directed by: Louis Schwartzberg
- Produced by: Louis Schwartzberg
- Cinematography: Louis Schwartzberg
- Edited by: Brian Funck; Tom McGah
- Music by: Joel McNeely
- Production companies: Walt Disney Pictures; Blacklight Films
- Distributed by: Buena Vista Pictures Distribution
- Release date: July 2, 2004
- Running time: 84 minutes
- Country: United States
- Language: English
- Box office: $314,402

America's Heart and Soul is a 2004 American documentary film produced by Blacklight Films and released by Walt Disney Pictures. It is a documentary and was directed by Louis Schwartzberg. The film was nominated for two MovieGuide Awards, winning one.

It was released on July 2, 2004, and grossed $314,402.

== Cast ==
- George Woodard - Dairy Farmer: Waterbury Center, Vermont
- Charles Jimmie Sr. - Tlingit Indian Elder: Klukwan, Alaska
- The Vazquez Brothers - Salsa Dancers: Los Angeles, California
- Frank & Dave Pino - Rock Band: Waltham, Massachusetts
- John "Yac" Yacobellis - Bike Messenger: New York, New York
- Patty Wagstaff - Aerobatic Flyer: St. Augustine, Florida
- Paul Stone - Explosive Art: Creede, Colorado
- Ed Holt - Wine Grower: Santa Maria, California
- Weirton Steelworkers - Themselves: Weirton, West Virginia
- Reverend Cecil Williams & Janice Mirikitani (Executive Director) - Glide Church: San Francisco, California
- David Krakauer - Klezmer Clarinetist: New York, New York
- James Andrews III & Trombone Shorty - Jazz Musicians: New Orleans, Louisiana
- Marc & Ann Savoy - Cajun Musicians: Eunice, Louisiana
- Dan Klennert - Junk Art: Elbe, Washington
- Art Car Festival - Themselves: Berkeley, California
- Michael Bennett - Olympic Boxer: Chicago, Illinois
- Erik Weihenmayer - Blind Chamber: Ouray, Colorado
- Mosie Burks - Gospel Singer: Jackson, Mississippi
- Ace Barnes & James Tuppen - Oil Well Fire Fighters: Livingston, Texas
- Ben Cohen - Co-Founder, Ben & Jerry's: Williston, Vermont
- Minnie Yancey - Rug Weaver: Berea, Kentucky
- Roudy Roudebush - Horse Wrangler: Telluride, Colorado
- Rick & Dick Hoyt - Boston Marathon: Boston, Massachusetts
- Amelia Rudolph - Founder, Bandaloop Cliff Dancers: Muir Beach, California
