= The Bridge (1999 film) =

1999 French film directed by Gérard Depardieu and Frédéric Auburtin

- Theatrical release poster
- Directed by: Gérard Depardieu; Frédéric Auburtin
- Written by: François Dupeyron, based on the novel by Alain Leblanc
- Produced by: Gérard Depardieu
- Starring: Carole Bouquet; Gérard Depardieu; Charles Berling
- Music by: Frédéric Auburtin
- Production companies: DD Productions; TF1 Films Production
- Distributed by: AMLF
- Release date: April 7, 1999 (France)
- Running time: 95 minutes
- Country: France
- Language: French
- Budget: €7.42million

The Bridge (French: Un pont entre deux rives; lit. 'A bridge between two banks') is a 1999 French romantic drama film, directed by Gérard Depardieu and Frédéric Auburtin, starring Carole Bouquet, Depardieu and Charles Berling.

== Synopsis ==
Normandy, 1962. For 15 years, Mina has been married to Georges, with whom she has a son, Tommy. She used to be very much in love with Georges but the passion of their marriage has died out. Mina meets Mathias, a handsome bridge-building engineer, and falls in love with him.

== Cast ==
- Carole Bouquet as Mina
- Gérard Depardieu as Georges
- Charles Berling as Mathias
- Christiane Cohendy as Gaby
- Dominique Reymond as Claire Daboval
- Mélanie Laurent as Lisbeth
- Michelle Goddet as Babet
- Stanislas Forlani as Tommy
- Gérard Dauzatas Mr Daboval
- Agathe Dronne as site secretary

== Production ==
The Bridge was Depardieu's second film as a director, 15 years after Le tartuffe. Lead actress Carole Bouquet was Depardieu's real-life partner at the time. It was the debut film of Mélanie Laurent.

== Release ==
The film was released on 7 April 1999 on 124 screens in France.

=== Home video ===
The film was released on VHS in 2000 and on DVD in 2007.

== Reception ==
Les Echos called the film a decent "first attempt" at directing by Depardieu and praised the performances of the three leads. Le Monde gave the film a negative review, calling it "banal", old-fashioned and ridiculously devoid of style.

The film performed poorly at the French box-office. It opened in ninth place at the French box office with admissions of 92,021, equating to a gross of approximately $552,126. It went on to have 270,865 admissions in France.
