= Cinéast(e)s =

- Directed by: Mathieu Busson; Julie Gayet
- Produced by: Christie Molia
- Production company: Tournez S'il Vous Plaît
- Distributed by: Ciné+
- Release dates: October 15, 2013 (France); March 15, 2014 (USA)
- Running time: 73 minutes
- Country: France
- Language: French

Cinéast(e)s is a 2013 French documentary film about filmmakers who are women. Julie Gayet interviews twenty-one French female filmmakers about the relevance of gender to filmmaking and the issues encountered by women in making films. It begins with the question: "is cinema gendered?"

== Cast ==
- Mona Achache
- Lisa Azuelos
- Josiane Balasko
- Valeria Bruni Tedeschi
- Julie Delpy
- Lola Doillon
- Valérie Donzelli
- Pascale Ferran
- Nicole Garcia
- Julie Gayet
- Mia Hansen-Løve
- Sophie Letourneur
- Tonie Marshall
- Patricia Mazuy
- Yolande Moreau
- Géraldine Nakache
- Katell Quillévéré
- Brigitte Roüan
- Céline Sciamma
- Agnès Varda
- Rebecca Zlotowski
