= Frédéric Auburtin =

French director, screenwriter, actor and film producer

- Born: 4 June 1962 (age 64); Marseille, France
- Occupations: Film director, screenwriter, film producer, actor, composer, second unit director, assistant director
- Years active: 1985–present

Frédéric Auburtin (born 4 June 1962) is a French director, writer, actor and producer.

== Life and career ==
Frédéric Auburtin was born and raised in Marseille, France, where he studied music (piano, drums) and literature before transitioning to the film industry in the early 1980s. He made his debut as an assistant director for the film Rouge midi, which was directed by Robert Guédiguian.

In the 1980s and 1990s he worked as an assistant director on various movies. The directors he worked with include Maurice Pialat (Under the Sun of Satan), Luigi Comencini (La Bohème), Richard Heffron (La Révolution française), Bertrand Blier (Merci la vie), Jean-Jacques Annaud (The Lover), Claude Berri (Germinal and Lucie Aubrac), Jean-Paul Rappeneau (The Horseman on the Roof) and Randall Wallace (The Man in the Iron Mask).

Auburtin developed a good working relationship with actor Gérard Depardieu, who credited him with an ability to "save films" as an assistant director; Depardieu said that when problems arose during production of The Man in the Iron Mask, he recommended Auburtin to Wallace as "THE fireman". In 1999, when Depardieu directed the film The Bridge (Un pont entre deux rives), he hired Auburtin as co-director. The film was Auburtin’s directorial debut; he also composed its soundtrack. During the 2000s, Auburtin directed mostly television productions, but also worked on theatrical features. Producer Claude Berri hired him as a technical advisor on the troubled shoot of San-Antonio (2004), also starring Depardieu, and ended up taking over directing duties. In 2006, he co-directed (again with Depardieu) the segment "Quartier Latin", , written by and starring Gena Rowlands, with Ben Gazzara and Depardieu, in the anthology film Paris, je t'aime. In 2009, he directed the comedy film Envoyés très spéciaux.

In 2014, Auburtin became involved in a controversial film operation as the director of United Passions. The film recounts the origins of FIFA, the world-governing body of soccer, and was ninety percent funded by them. Released in North America at the peak of the scandals of the 2015 FIFA corruption case, the film performed very poorly at the box-office (a mere $918 in its opening weekend) and received overwhelmingly negative reviews from critics around the world. It is now considered one of the worst movies ever made. Auburtin himself regretted his involvement and considered the film a "disaster", though he said that he was a "victim of the game" after accepting the job.

== Filmography ==
=== Assistant Director ===
- Rouge midi (1985) (third assistant director)
- Les Fugitifs (1986) (third assistant director)
- Under the Sun of Satan (1987) (second assistant director)
- La Bohème (1988) (second assistant director)
- La Révolution française (1989) (second assistant director)
- La fille des collines (1990) (first assistant director)
- Merci la vie (1991) (second unit director)
- The Lover (1992) (first assistant director)
- Germinal (1993) (first assistant director)
- The Horseman on the Roof (1995) (first assistant director)
- Lucie Aubrac (1997) (first assistant director)
- The Man in the Iron Mask (1998) (first assistant director)

=== Director ===
- The Bridge (co-director with Gérard Depardieu, 1999)
- Boulevard du Palais (TV series) (1 episode) (2001)
- Volpone (TV Movie) (2003)
- San-Antonio (2004)
- Paris, je t'aime (segment "Quartier Latin", co-director with Gérard Depardieu, 2006)
- La vie à une (TV movie) (2008)
- Envoyés très spéciaux (2009)
- La plus pire semaine de ma vie (TV series) (2 episodes) (2010–2011)
- United Passions (2014)

=== Actor ===
- Under the Sun of Satan (1987)
- Un amour de trop (1989)
- The Lover (1992)
- Le secret de Polichinelle (1997)

=== Writer ===
- Boulevard du Palais (TV series) (1999)
- Paris, je t'aime (2006)
- United Passions (2014)

=== Composer ===
- The Bridge (1999)
- Volpone (TV movie) (2003)
- La vie à une (TV movie) (2008)

=== Production Manager ===
- Jean de Florette (1986) (unit manager)
- Manon des sources (1986) (unit manager)

=== Editorial Department ===
- Paris, je t'aime (2006) (editorial supervisor)

=== Soundtrack ===
- Envoyés très spéciaux ("Un euro pour nos otages") (2009)

=== Himself ===
- Un jour dans la vie du cinéma français (TV movie documentary) (2002)
