= Mélanie Laurent =

French actress, director and singer (born 1983)

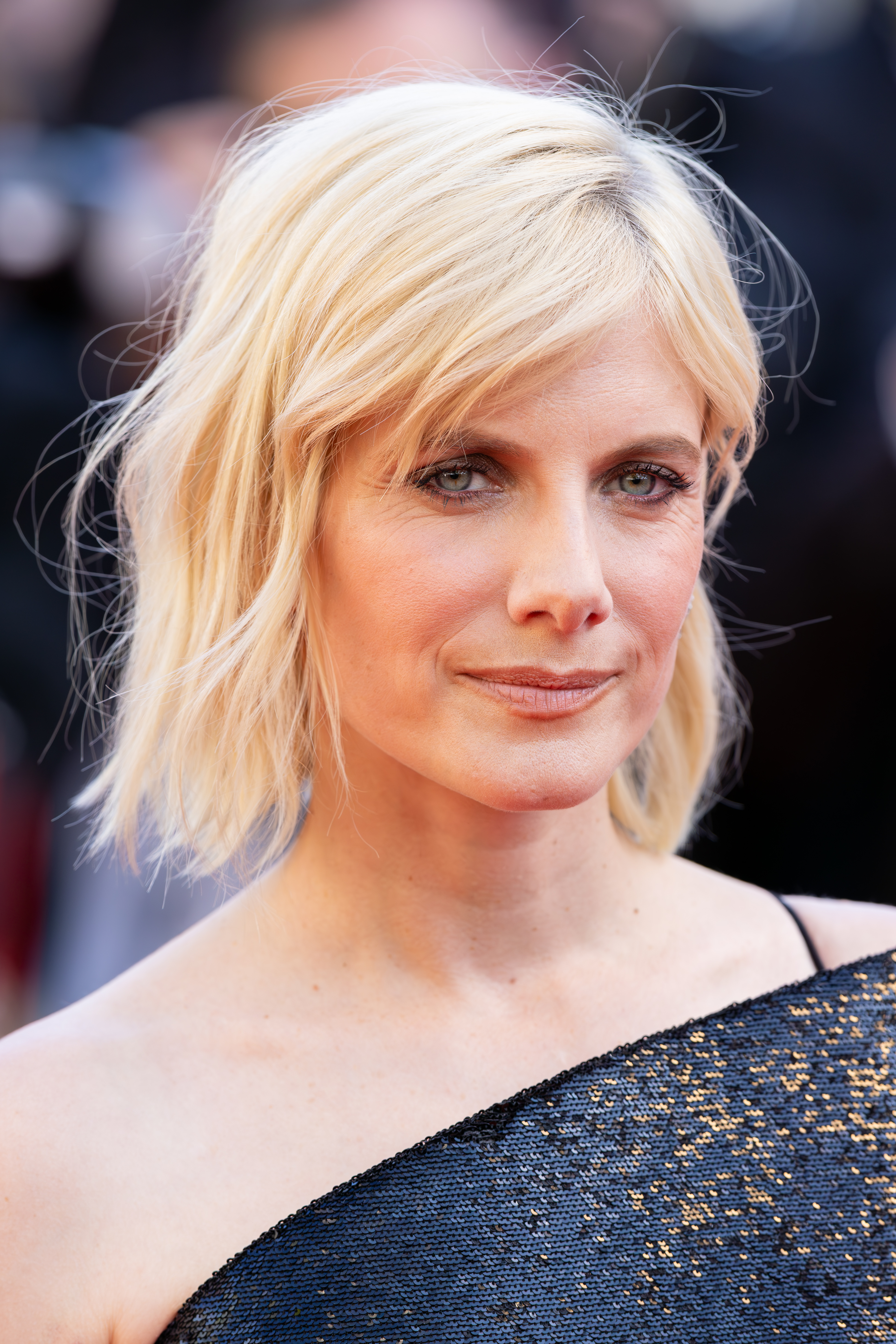
- Laurent at the 2025 Cannes Film Festival
- Born: 21 February 1983 (age 43); Paris, France
- Occupations: Actress; filmmaker; singer
- Years active: 1997–present
- Spouse(s): Unknown (kept private) (m. c. 2013)
- Partner: Julien Boisselier (2005–2009)
- Children: 2

Mélanie Laurent (French pronunciation: [melani loʁɑ̃]; born 21 February 1983) is a French actress, filmmaker, and singer. She has received two César Awards and a Lumière Award. Internationally, Laurent is known for her roles in Inglourious Basterds (2009), Now You See Me (2013), Operation Finale (2018) 6 Underground (2019) and Fauda season 5 (2026)

Laurent began acting at age sixteen, cast by Gérard Depardieu in a small role in the romantic drama The Bridge (1999). She gained wider recognition for her supporting work in several French films, including the comedy Dikkenek (2006), for which she won Étoiles d'Or for Best Female Newcomer. Her breakthrough role came in the 2006 drama film Don't Worry, I'm Fine, for which she won the César Award for Most Promising Actress and the Prix Romy Schneider. Laurent made her Hollywood debut in 2009 with the role of Shosanna Dreyfus in Quentin Tarantino's blockbuster war film Inglourious Basterds. Her performance won the Online Film Critics Society and the Austin Film Critics Association Best Actress Awards.

While she has worked mainly in independent films, including Paris (2008) and Enemy (2013), Laurent also appeared in commercially successful international films, including the comedy drama Beginners (2011), and the caper film Now You See Me (2013), the former earning her a nomination at the San Diego Film Critics Society Award for Best Supporting Actress. Her other notable works include the art-house drama The Round Up (2010), the comedy drama The Day I Saw Your Heart (2011), and the mystery thriller Night Train to Lisbon (2013). She is also known for voicing Mary Katherine and Disgust in the French dubs of Epic (2013) and Inside Out (2015) respectively. Additionally, she starred in Chris Weitz's 2018 drama Operation Finale, telling the story of the capture of Nazi Adolf Eichmann.

In addition to her film career, Laurent has appeared in stage productions in France. She made her theatre debut in 2010 in Nicolas Bedos's Promenade de santé. The short film De moins en moins (2008) marked her debut as a filmmaker. Her feature film directorial debut is The Adopted (2011). Respire (2014), her second production as a director, was screened in the Critics' Week section at the 2014 Cannes Film Festival. She made her singing debut with a studio album En t'attendant (Waiting For You) in 2011.

== Early life ==
Laurent was born on 21 February 1983 in Paris, France the daughter of Annick (a ballerina) and Pierre Laurent (a voiceover actor, who dubs the character Ned Flanders in the French version of The Simpsons). Her father is from Nancy and her mother is Jewish, of both Ashkenazi Jewish (Polish-Jewish) and Sephardic Jewish (Tunisian-Jewish) descent. Her grandfather was deported from Poland during the Nazi occupation, but survived. Her maternal grandparents were film poster editors. She grew up in the 9th arrondissement of Paris.

Laurent visited the set of Asterix and Obelix vs. Caesar with her friend and the latter's father. Actor Gérard Depardieu, seeing Laurent there, asked her if she wanted to be in films. Laurent replied, "Why not?". He strongly advised her not to take acting classes because he believed she already had the necessary skills. When Laurent was 16, Depardieu gave her a part in The Bridge, a drama he starred in and co-directed with Frédéric Auburtin. Laurent played the role of Lisbeth Daboval, the daughter of one of the protagonists of the film, Claire Daboval. Laurent also worked as a voiceover actor, dubbing the character Satsuki in the French version of My Neighbour Totoro, as well as the younger version of Madame de Fleurville in an animated adaptation of Sophie's Misfortunes.

== Career ==
=== 2006–2008: debut and early success ===
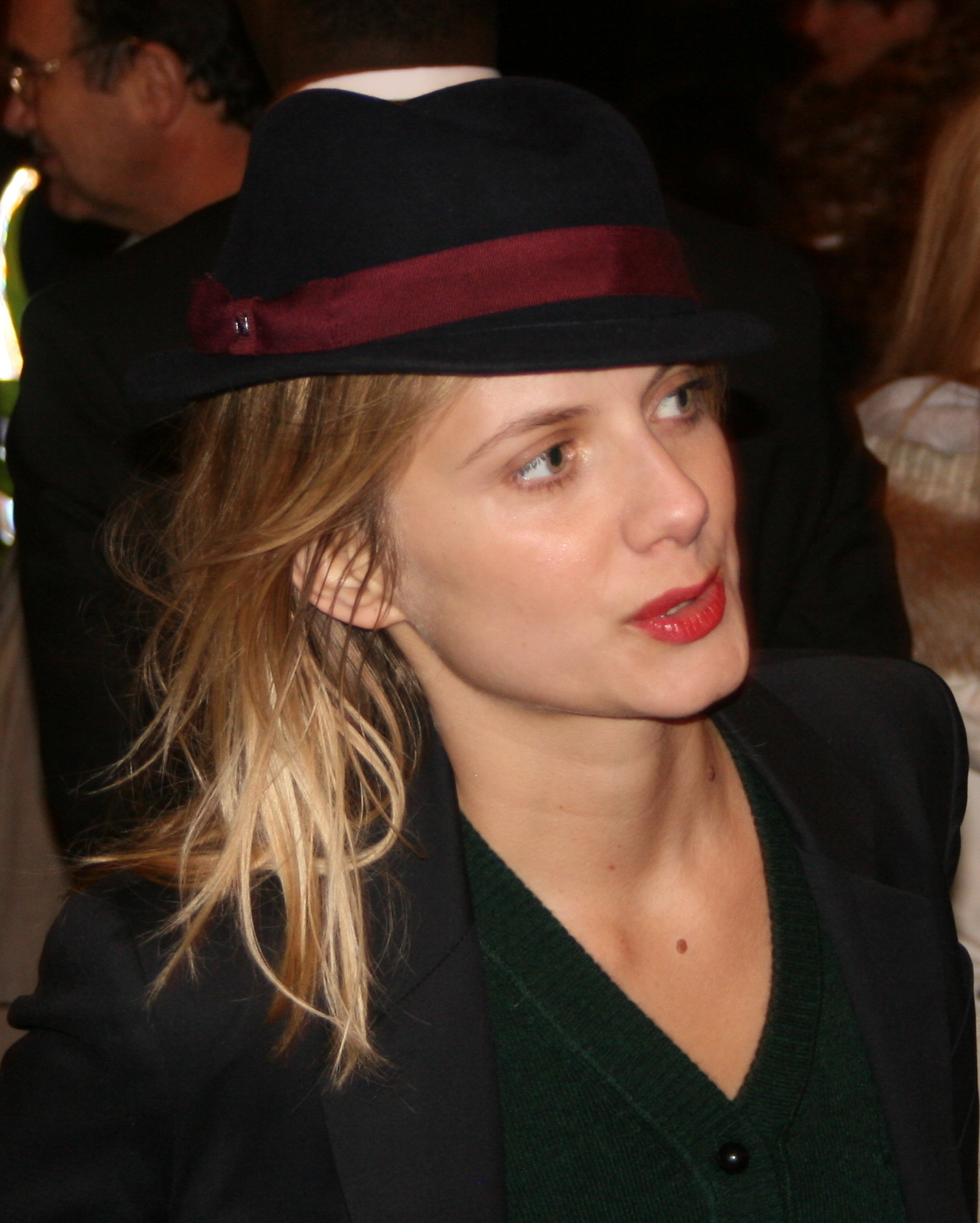
Laurent in 2008

Laurent played minor roles in a number of films early in her career. She appeared in Michel Blanc's drama Summer Things, Jackie Chan's comedy-drama Rice Rhapsody, Jacques Audiard's drama The Beat That My Heart Skipped and the war film Days of Glory about the Free French Forces.

Laurent's breakthrough role came in 2006, when she played a sullen 19-year-old who longed for her lost twin brother, in Philippe Lioret's Don't Worry, I'm Fine. She won a César Award for Most Promising Actress for her performance. In a review for Variety, Ronnie Scheib praised Laurent and wrote that she, "makes her vibrant character's downward spiral totally believable without indulging in moody sullenness". That same year, she and Belgian actor Jérémie Renier were awarded France's Romy Schneider and Jean Gabin Prizes for most promising actor and actress. Laurent then starred in the Franco-Belgian Dikkenek, a comedy directed by Olivier Van Hoofstadt that has attained a cult film over the years owing to its Belgian-style humour, in which she co-starred alongside Marion Cotillard, Jérémie Renier, Jean-Luc Couchard and Dominique Pinon. For her performance in the film, Laurent won the Étoiles d'Or for Best Female Newcomer.

In 2007, Laurent appeared in films including Le tueur and Hidden Love. She was nominated for the Lumière Award for Best Actress for her performance in La Chambre des morts. Laurent next appeared in Cédric Klapisch's 2008 comedy drama Paris, a French film concerning a diverse group of people. The film has an ensemble cast including Laurent, Juliette Binoche, Romain Duris, Fabrice Luchini, and François Cluzet. The film was well received and praised for the cast's performances.

=== 2009–2010: Hollywood debut and breakthrough ===
Laurent was scheduled to direct her first play, Mi-cuit cœur pistache (the name of a dessert she particularly likes) in January 2009 at the Théâtre Marigny in Paris. She had to abandon the project when she was cast as Shosanna Dreyfus, a Parisian who seeks revenge on Nazis in the Quentin Tarantino film Inglourious Basterds, alongside Brad Pitt, Diane Kruger and Christoph Waltz. It was a French-language role for which she learned to speak English for a few scenes. The film was a big commercial and critical success, grossing over $321 million in theaters worldwide. Laurent's performance was praised by several critics. Kyle Buchanan of Movieline wrote: "Mélanie Laurent provides Inglourious Basterds its heart and soul. It falls to the 26-year-old French actress to anchor some of the World War II film's most challenging scenes as Shosanna."

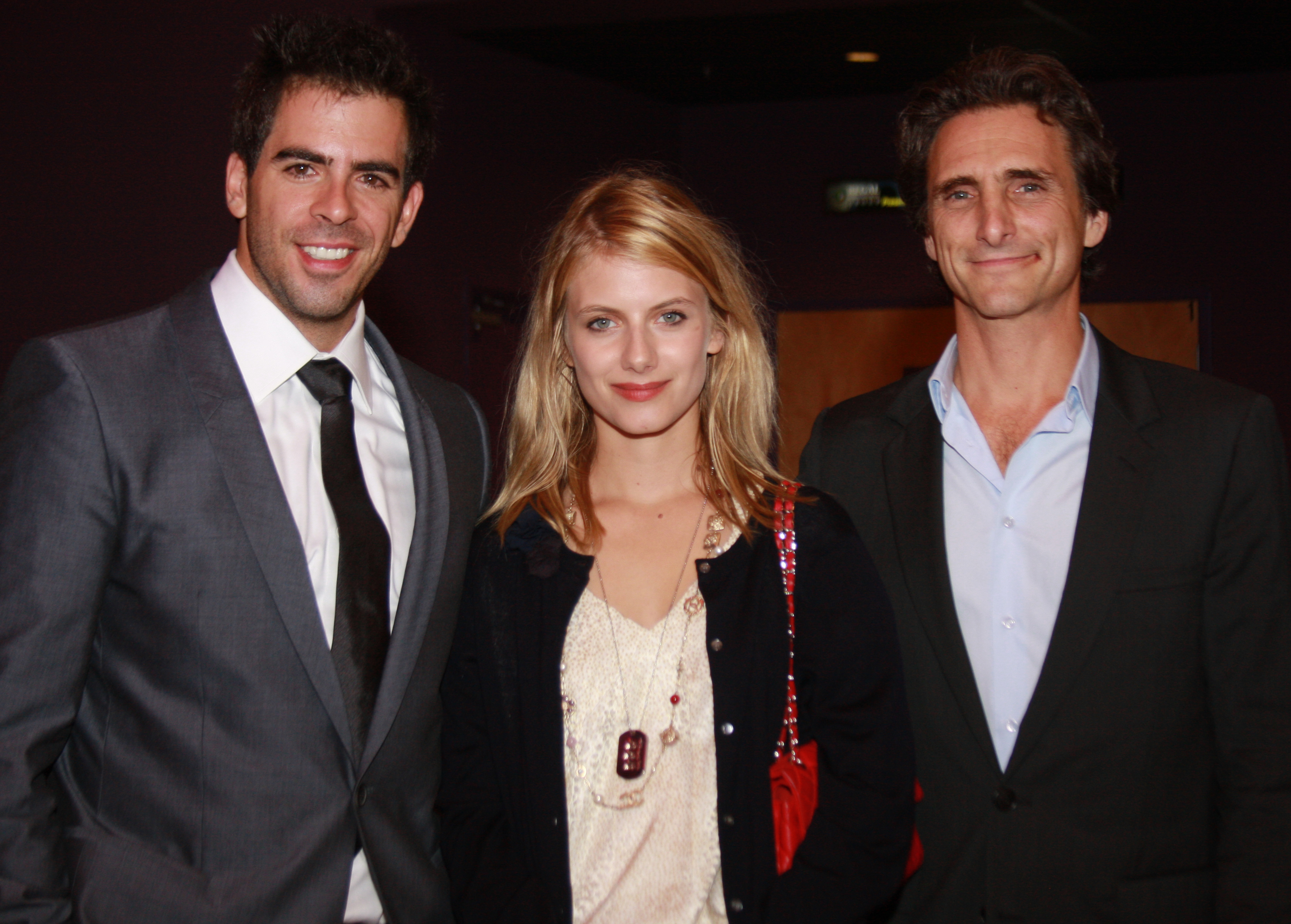
Eli Roth, Laurent, and Lawrence Bender at a screening of Inglourious Basterds in 2009

Owen Gleiberman of Entertainment Weekly wrote that Laurent should have received the nomination at the 16th Screen Actors Guild Awards saying, "In drawing attention to one performer, in particular, whom they left out of the Best Supporting Actress category, [...] I flat-out adore this performance and I suspect that many others do too," and further lauding Laurent's performance he added, "[Laurent] is radiant and, in a unique Tarantino way, heartbreaking. Sexy and luminous in the heat of her valor. Putting out fire – and setting it. It becomes an anthem of noirish dread and excitement, a sign that Laurent, as Shosanna, has found her destiny."

In an interview, Laurent stated that she went into Inglourious Basterds with adoration for Quentin Tarantino. "[The French] don't see him like an independent director; we just see him as the best director, ever, [from the United States]." About the process of auditioning, Laurent said that she knew right from the start that this was a film she had to be in, as she felt a connection to her role in the film, because of the history of her Jewish family.

In addition, Laurent won a number of accolades for her portrayal of Shosanna including Austin Film Critics Association Award for Best Actress and Online Film Critics Society Award for Best Actress, and nominations at the Detroit Film Critics Society Awards, Empire Award for Best Actress, and Saturn Award for Best Actress among others. The highly anticipated film, which had been in development since 1998, marked Laurent's first major role in an American film and Laurent found herself pushed into mainstream success in North America.

Laurent's partner Julien Boisselier, as well as Marie Denarnaud, Mélanie Doutey, and Louise Monot were to act in the production while short film clips were to be projected on stage, some of them shot at the nightclub Le Baron, which Laurent used to frequent during the writing period.

In 2010, Laurent starred in The Round Up, a French film directed by Roselyne Bosch, and produced by Alain Goldman, alongside Jean Reno, Sylvie Testud, and Gad Elmaleh. Based on the true story of a young Jewish boy, the film depicts the Vel' d'Hiv Roundup, the mass arrest of Jews by French police who were Nazi accomplices in Paris in July 1942. The film and Laurent's performance were well received by the critics, with Peter Bradshaw of The Guardian deeming it "well acted". John Anderson of Newsday lauded Laurent saying that she gave an "inspiring performance as a gentile nurse".

=== 2011–present: continued success ===
Laurent had also planned another feature film, Putain de pluie!, produced by Alain Attal's Productions du Trésor, whose script she co-wrote with Morgan Perez and which she intended to direct. Originally set for filming in the spring of 2009, it was postponed because of her work on Inglourious Basterds. Knowing that she could speak French, and had already acted in French in one of the short films in Paris, je t'aime, she offered the first role to Natalie Portman, who declined because of the script's language.

Laurent played the part of the violinist in Radu Mihăileanu's Le Concert—she called it "a smart movie and a popular movie", and added that she was, "glad because French people wanted to watch a movie with classical music." Mick LaSalle of San Francisco Chronicle called it a "role with great technical demands" and praising Laurent wrote, "she's extremely subtle and reserved ... "The Concert" constitutes a breakthrough for her, in that it unlocks her emotional floodgates".

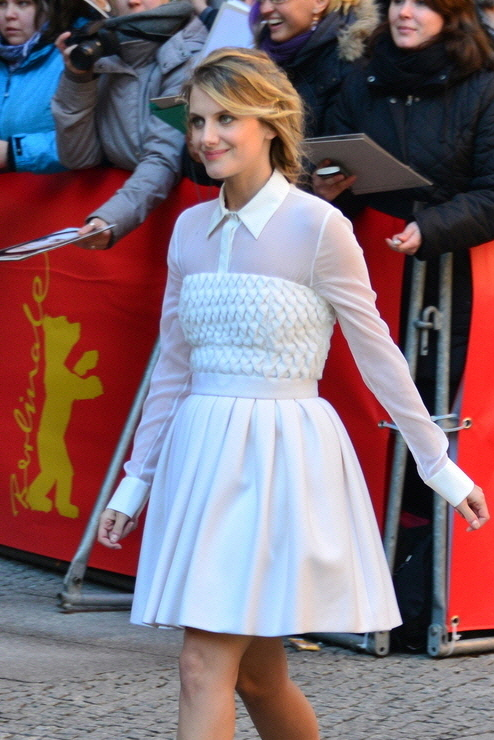
Laurent promotes Aloft at the 2014 Berlinale International Film Festival

Laurent hosted both the opening and closing ceremonies of the 64th Cannes Film Festival. In 2011, she teamed with Mike Mills, appearing opposite Ewan McGregor and Christopher Plummer in Beginners, a comedy drama that marked Laurent's second English-speaking role in Hollywood. Laurent plays Anna, an irreverent French actress. Loosely based on Mills' own life, the film depicts the story of a father coming out of the closet at the age of 75 after the death of his wife of 45 years. The film opened to critical acclaim and Laurent's performance was well received, with Calvin Wilson of St. Louis Post-Dispatch remarking that Laurent imbued a "soulful charisma" into the role.

Laurent then starred opposite Jeremy Irons in Night Train to Lisbon, a 2013 drama film based on the novel of the same name directed by Bille August. Jessica Kiang of Indie Wire noted that Laurent was "given less to do" but lauded her performance writing that she, "makes the most of her truncated screen time".

Laurent appeared in the Louis Leterrier's 2013 caper film Now You See Me as a French Interpol agent who investigates the bank theft alongside Mark Ruffalo and an ensemble cast. The film was a major commercial success grossing over 351.7 million dollars, receiving mixed reviews but praise for the performances of the entire cast. Todd McCarthy of The Hollywood Reporter gave Laurent the highest praise and wrote, "[Laurent] is responsible for the only measurable amount of warmth the film exudes."

Laurent's next release, the Canadian-Spanish psychological thriller film Enemy, directed by Denis Villeneuve, was screened at the Special Presentation section at the 2013 Toronto International Film Festival. Loosely adapted by Javier Gullón from José Saramago's 2002 novel The Double, the film opened to critical acclaim. The film starred Jake Gyllenhaal as two men who are physically identical, but different in terms of personality. Laurent and Sarah Gadon co-star as the romantic partners of the men.

In 2014, Laurent appeared in Aloft, a 2014 drama film written and directed by Claudia Llosa, alongside Jennifer Connelly and Cillian Murphy. The film premiered in competition at the 64th Berlin International Film Festival. Laurent voiced Mary Katherine in Blue Sky Studios' Epic, and Disgust in Pixar's Inside Out in the French dubs of the animated films.

In 2015, Laurent starred alongside Laurent Lafitte, in François Favrat's French drama film Boomerang adapted from the bestseller entitled A Secret Kept by Tatiana De Rosnay. The film released on 23 September 2013 to positive critical reviews. The Hollywood Reporter wrote, "Boomerang is a solid if somewhat conventionally made whodunit that benefits from a strong cast and a plot that hooks you for most of the running time." Laurent then starred as Léa in Angelina Jolie's By the Sea, an American drama film, written and directed by Jolie. The film also stars Jolie and Brad Pitt, and was released on 13 November 2015, by Universal Pictures. Laurent later appeared in the 2018 drama Operation Finale directed by Chris Weitz, which revolved around the Mossad operation to capture Adolf Eichmann.

In 2025, Laurent will star in Joséphine Japy's directorial debut, The Wonderers.

=== 2008–present: filmmaking career ===
Laurent made her debut as a director and starred her brother Mathieu with the 2008 short film De moins en moins, which she also wrote, a 7-minute film about a patient who "remembers less and less" in front of her psychiatrist. The film was nominated for Best Short Film at the 61st Annual Cannes Film Festival. She also directed À ses pieds, an erotic short film aired on the French television channel Canal+ on 25–26 October 2008, as part of a series of short films, called X Femmes.

In 2011, she directed and self-starred in her first feature film, The Adopted. Her second film, Breathe, was screened at the Critics' Week section at the 2014 Cannes Film Festival and was highly acclaimed. She then co-directed the 2015 documentary Tomorrow, which earned her a César Award for Best Documentary Film.

In an interview with Indiewire in 2014, Laurent admitted that she loves writing: "[Writing is] especially super exciting because you have everything to do and most of your ideas come from that first part... you just imagine things, and you imagine actors." She described the shooting process as "the fun part" because of "working with people I love—it's always a great human moment because we're sharing things and it's good to see people who are here for you and your story, to tell your story. It's really beautiful, it's why I love making movies."

Laurent made her English-language directorial debut in 2018 with Galveston, the film adaptation of Nic Pizzolatto's novel of the same name. It starred Ben Foster and Elle Fanning.

Laurent directed and self-starred in The Mad Women's Ball in 2021.

Laurent next directed Wingwomen for Netflix in 2023 and Libre for Amazon Prime Video in 2024.

Laurent was announced to direct The Nightingale, an adaptation of novel of the same name by Kristin Hannah, which was set to star Elle and Dakota Fanning. However, filming never commenced, and the film was completely removed from the release schedule in October 2021. The film was ultimately taken over by Michael Morris in 2025. The Nightingale is scheduled to be released in 2027.

In 2026, Laurent appeared in season 5 of the Israeli series Fauda as the French wife of a Hamas terrorist.

=== Music ===
Laurent made her singing debut in May 2011 with a studio album En t'attendant, under the label of Atmosphériques. Produced by Joel Shearer, the album contains twelve songs, five of which are co-written and co-produced by Irish folk musician Damien Rice. The album peaked at number 22 and number 35 on the Belgian Albums Charts and French Albums Charts respectively. She recorded the album with Rice, who lives between Woodstock, New York, and his home in Ireland.

== Personal life and off-screen work ==
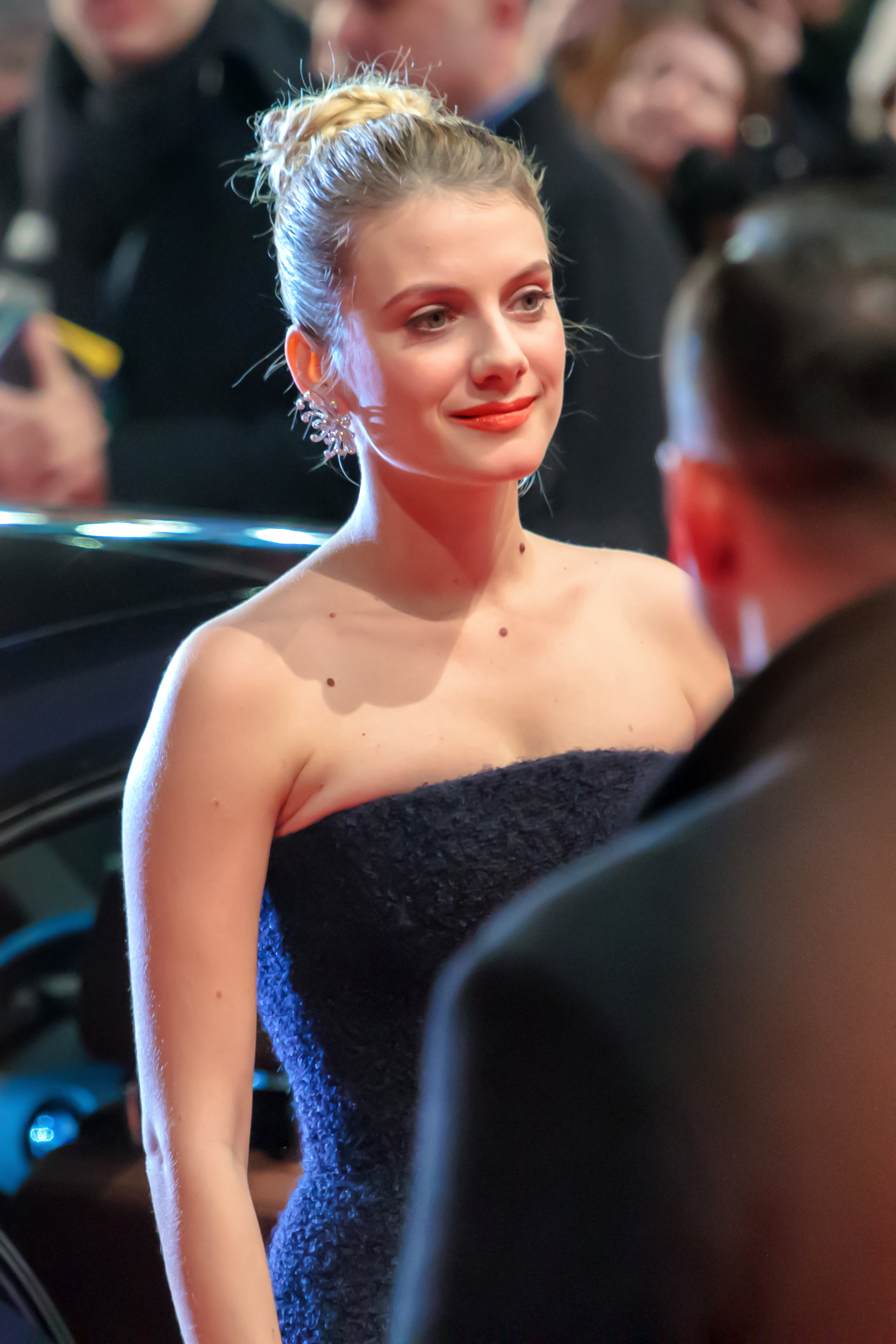
Laurent at the 63rd Berlin International Film Festival (2013)

Laurent was in a long-term relationship with fellow French actor Julien Boisselier which ended in 2009. In March 2013, she revealed that she had married but refused to name her spouse. She told The Independent, "he was a crew member and I was an actress." Her first child with her husband, a son named Léo, was born in September 2013. In 2019, she gave birth to their second child together, a girl named Mila. As of 2019, the family lives in Los Angeles.

Laurent visited a Climate Defenders Camp in the peatlands of the Indonesian rainforest with Greenpeace activists. She is one of the Climate Ambassadors for Kofi Annan's Global Humanitarian Forum "Tck Tck Tck" Campaign. She joined the campaign against overfishing at the invitation of the Blue Marine Foundation, and was cast for the voice-over of the French documentary Surpêche (based on the book The End of the Line) about the hazards of overfishing. She was also one of the leading celebrities in the successful campaign Fish Fight France, which asked for a new European law lowering the level of fish discards in European seas. Laurent revealed that spending time at musician Damien Rice's home in Ireland, while working on her 2011 album, inspired her to maintain a compost heap and eat organic food.

== Filmography and awards ==
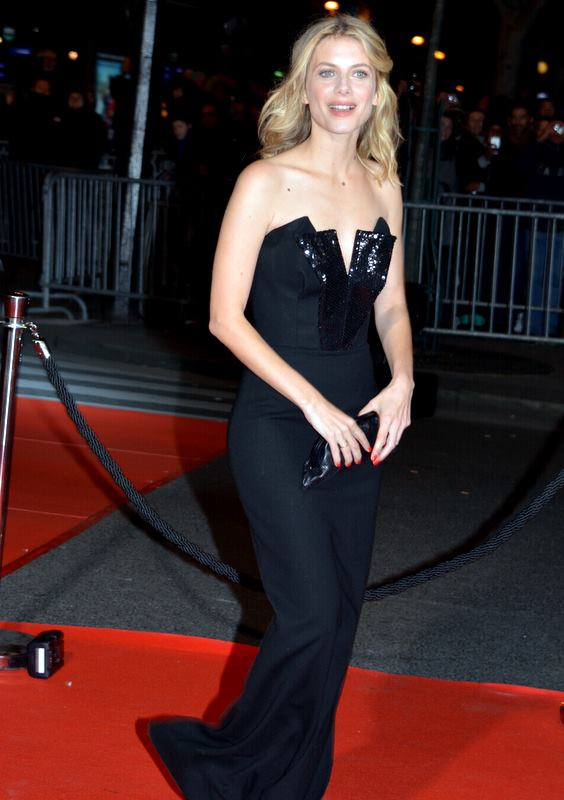
Laurent at the 2016 Cesar Awards, as the director for the documentary film Tomorrow

Laurent has appeared in over 40 films and directed 10 films. For her role in Don't Worry, I'm Fine, Laurent won the César Award and Lumière Award in the Most Promising Actress category. She received numerous accolades for her role in Inglourious Basterds, including Best Actress awards at the Austin Film Critics Association Awards and Online Film Critics Society Awards among others. Laurent's film Tomorrow (2015) won the César Award for Best Documentary Film.

== Discography ==
Year	Album details	Chart positions	
Year	Album details	BEL	FRA
2011	En t'attendant.: Released: 2 May 2011; Label: Atmosphériques; Formats: LP, CD, digital download	23	35
