= List of awards and nominations received by Alexandre Desplat =

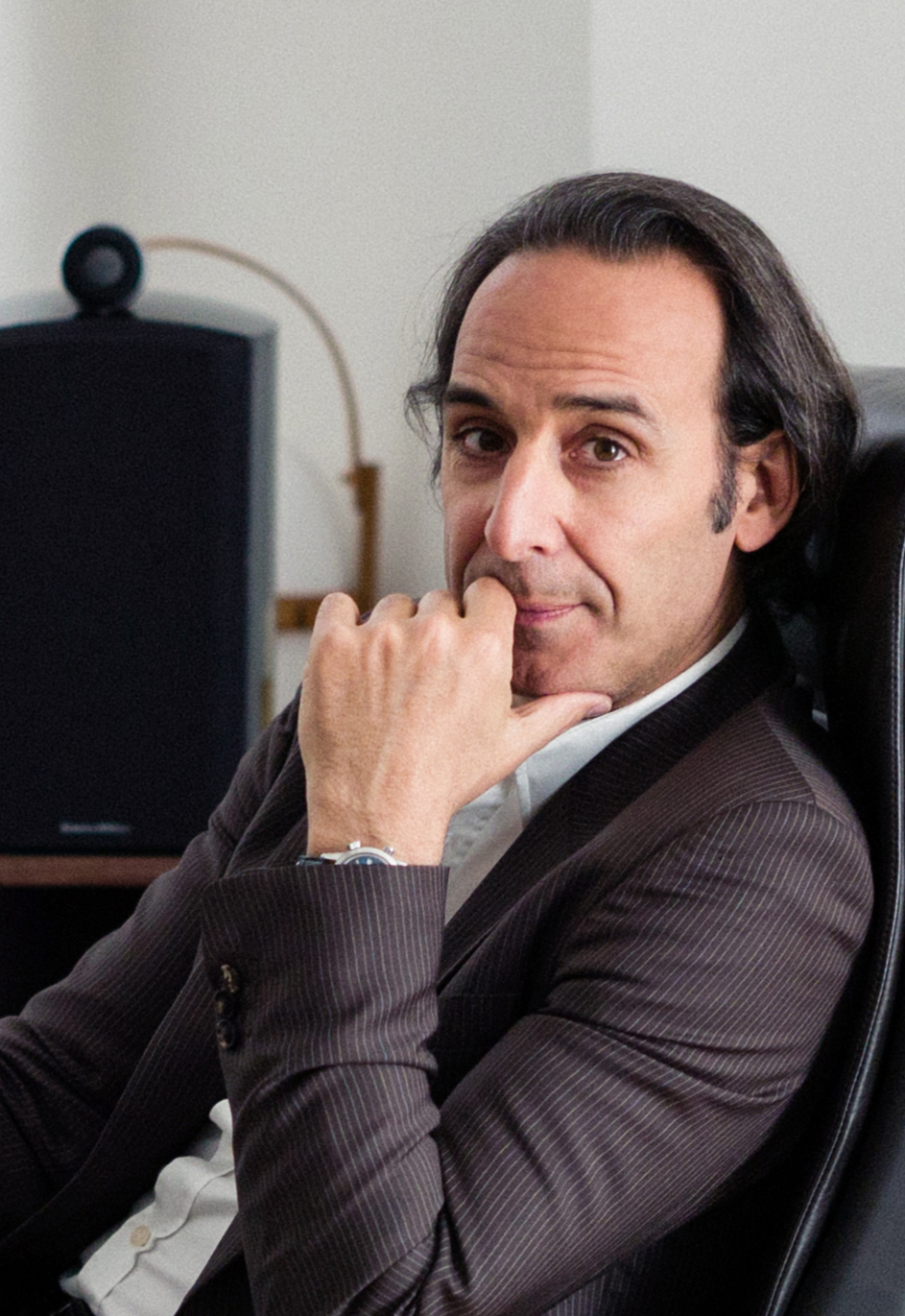
Desplat in 2015

This is a list of awards and nominations received by Alexandre Desplat, a French film composer.

It includes two Academy Awards, three BAFTA Awards and two Golden Globe Awards.

== Major associations ==
=== Academy Awards ===
The Academy Awards are a set of awards given annually for excellence of cinematic achievements. The awards, organized by the Academy of Motion Picture Arts and Sciences, were first held in 1929 at the Hollywood Roosevelt Hotel. Desplat has received two awards from twelve nominations.

Year	Nominated work	Category	Result	Ref.
2007	The Queen	Best Original Score	Nominated	
2009	The Curious Case of Benjamin Button	Best Original Score	Nominated	
2010	Fantastic Mr. Fox	Best Original Score	Nominated	
2011	The King's Speech	Best Original Score	Nominated	
2013	Argo	Best Original Score	Nominated	
2014	Philomena	Best Original Score	Nominated	
2015	The Grand Budapest Hotel	Best Original Score	Won	
2015	The Imitation Game	Best Original Score	Nominated	
2018	The Shape of Water	Best Original Score	Won	
2019	Isle of Dogs	Best Original Score	Nominated	
2020	Little Women	Best Original Score	Nominated	
2026	Frankenstein	Best Original Score	Nominated	

=== BAFTA Awards ===
The BAFTA Award is an annual award show presented by the British Academy of Film and Television Arts. The awards were founded in 1947 as The British Film Academy, by David Lean, Alexander Korda, Carol Reed, Charles Laughton, Roger Manvell and others. Desplat has received three awards from eleven nominations.

Year	Nominated work	Category	Result	Ref.
2003	Girl with a Pearl Earring	Best Film Music	Nominated	
2006	The Queen	Best Film Music	Nominated	
2009	The Curious Case of Benjamin Button	Best Film Music	Nominated	
2010	Fantastic Mr. Fox	Best Film Music	Nominated	
2011	The King's Speech	Best Film Music	Won	
2013	Argo	Best Film Music	Nominated	
2015	The Grand Budapest Hotel	Best Film Music	Won	
2018	The Shape of Water	Best Film Music	Won	
2019	Isle of Dogs	Best Film Music	Nominated	
2020	Little Women	Best Film Music	Nominated	
2022	The French Dispatch	Best Film Music	Nominated	
2023	Guillermo del Toro's Pinocchio	Best Film Music	Nominated	

=== César Awards ===
The César Awards are France's national film awards. With three awards out of ten nominations, Desplat is both the most nominated and most rewarded composer.

Year	Nominated work	Category	Result	Ref.
1997	Un héros très discret	Best Music Written for a Film	Nominated	
2002	Sur mes lèvres	Best Music Written for a Film	Nominated	
2006	The Beat That My Heart Skipped	Best Music Written for a Film	Won	
2008	L'Ennemi intime	Best Music Written for a Film	Nominated	
2010	A Prophet	Best Music Written for a Film	Nominated	
2011	The Ghost Writer	Best Music Written for a Film	Won	
2013	Rust and Bone	Best Music Written for a Film	Won	
2014	Venus in Fur	Best Music Written for a Film	Nominated	
2019	The Sisters Brothers	Best Music Written for a Film	Nominated	
2020	An Officer and a Spy	Best Music Written for a Film	Nominated	

=== Golden Globe Awards ===
The Golden Globe Award is an accolade bestowed by the 93 members of the Hollywood Foreign Press Association (HFPA) recognizing excellence in film and television, both domestic and foreign. Desplat has received two awards from twelve nominations.

Year	Nominated work	Category	Result	Ref.
2004	Girl with a Pearl Earring	Best Original Score – Motion Picture	Nominated	
2006	Syriana	Best Original Score – Motion Picture	Nominated	
2007	The Painted Veil	Best Original Score – Motion Picture	Won	
2009	The Curious Case of Benjamin Button	Best Original Score – Motion Picture	Nominated	
2011	The King's Speech	Best Original Score – Motion Picture	Nominated	
2013	Argo	Best Original Score – Motion Picture	Nominated	
2015	The Imitation Game	Best Original Score – Motion Picture	Nominated	
2016	The Danish Girl	Best Original Score – Motion Picture	Nominated	
2018	The Shape of Water	Best Original Score – Motion Picture	Won	
2019	Isle of Dogs	Best Original Score – Motion Picture	Nominated	
2020	Little Women	Best Original Score – Motion Picture	Nominated	
2021	The Midnight Sky	Best Original Score – Motion Picture	Nominated	
2022	The French Dispatch	Best Original Score – Motion Picture	Nominated	
2023	Guillermo del Toro's Pinocchio	Best Original Score – Motion Picture	Nominated	
2023	Guillermo del Toro's Pinocchio	Best Original Song	Nominated	
2026	Frankenstein	Best Original Score – Motion Picture	Nominated	

=== Grammy Awards ===
The Grammy Awards are presented by The Recording Academy to recognize achievements in the music industry. Desplat has received ten nominations and won two awards.

Year	Nominated work	Category	Result	Ref.
2009	The Curious Case of Benjamin Button	Best Score Soundtrack for Visual Media	Nominated	
2011	The King's Speech	Best Score Soundtrack for Visual Media	Won	
2012	Harry Potter and the Deathly Hallows – Part 2	Best Score Soundtrack for Visual Media	Nominated	
2013	Argo	Best Score Soundtrack for Visual Media	Nominated	
2013	Zero Dark Thirty	Best Score Soundtrack for Visual Media	Nominated	
2015	The Grand Budapest Hotel	Best Score Soundtrack for Visual Media	Won	
2016	The Imitation Game	Best Score Soundtrack for Visual Media	Nominated	
2019	The Shape of Water	Best Score Soundtrack for Visual Media	Nominated	
2019	"The Shape of Water"	Best Arrangement, Instrumental or A Capella	Nominated	
2019	"The Shape of Water"	Best Instrumental Composition	Nominated	
2021	"Plumfield"	Best Instrumental Composition	Nominated	

== Other awards ==
=== Annie Awards ===
Year	Nominee / work	Award	Result
40th Annie Awards	Rise of the Guardians	Outstanding Achievement for Music in an Animated Feature Production	Nominated
44th Annie Awards	The Secret Life of Pets	Best Music in an Animated Feature Production	Nominated
44th Annie Awards	Trollhunters	Best Music in an Animated TV/Broadcast Production	Nominated
50th Annie Awards	Pinocchio	Best Music in an Animated Feature Production	Won

=== Lumière Awards ===
Year	Nominee / work	Award	Result
2019	The Sisters Brothers	Best Music	Nominated
2020	Adults in the Room	Best Music	Won

=== Satellite Awards ===
Year	Nominee / work	Award	Result
2010	Harry Potter and the Deathly Hallows – Part 1	Best Score	Nominated
2011	Harry Potter and the Deathly Hallows – Part 2	Best Score	Nominated
2012	Argo	Best Score	Won
2013	Philomena	Best Score	Nominated
2014	The Imitation Game	Best Score	Nominated
2015	The Danish Girl	Best Score	Nominated
2017	The Shape of Water	Best Score	Nominated
2018	The Sisters Brothers	Best Score	Nominated
2020	The Midnight Sky	Best Score	Won
2021	The French Dispatch	Best Score	Nominated

== Critics and music groups ==
=== Won ===
- 2005 Silver Berlin Bear for Best Film Music – The Beat That My Heart Skipped
- 2006 Los Angeles Film Critics Association Award for Best Music – The Painted Veil and The Queen
- 2007 BMI Film Music Award – The Queen
- 2007 European Film Award for Best Composer – The Queen
- 2007 Golden Horse Award for Best Original Film Score – Lust, Caution
- 2007 World Soundtrack Award for Film Composer of the Year – The Queen and The Painted Veil
- 2008 Phoenix Film Critics Society Award for Best Original Score – The Curious Case of Benjamin Button
- 2009 BMI Film Music Award – The Curious Case of Benjamin Button
- 2009 World Soundtrack Award for Best Original Score of the Year – The Curious Case of Benjamin Button
- 2009 World Soundtrack Award for Film Composer of the Year – The Curious Case of Benjamin Button, Coco Before Chanel, Largo Winch and Chéri
- 2010 Étoile d'Or for Best Music (Meilleure musique) – A Prophet, The Army of Crime, Afterwards, Coco Before Chanel and Chéri
- 2010 World Soundtrack Award for Best Original Score of the Year – Fantastic Mr. Fox
- 2010 World Soundtrack Award for Film Composer of the Year – Fantastic Mr. Fox, The Twilight Saga: New Moon, Julie & Julia, The Ghost Writer
- 2010 IFMCA Award for Best Original Score for a Drama Film – The King's Speech
- 2010 IFMCA Award for Film Composer of the Year
- 2010 IFMCA Award for Best Original Score for an Action/Adventure/Thriller Film – The Ghost Writer
- 2011 Sammy Film Music Award for Best New Film Score – The King's Speech
- 2011 César Award for Best Music Written for a Film (Meilleure musique écrite pour un film) – The Ghost Writer
- 2011 World Soundtrack Award for Film Composer of the Year – A Better Life, The Burma Conspiracy, The King's Speech, The Tree of Life, The Well Digger's Daughter, Harry Potter and the Deathly Hallows – Part 1, and Harry Potter and the Deathly Hallows – Part 2
- 2011 Étoile d'Or for Film Music Composer – The Ghost Writer
- 2011 San Diego Film Critics Society Award for Best Score – Harry Potter and the Deathly Hallows – Part 2
- 2014 World Soundtrack Award for Best Original Score of the Year – The Grand Budapest Hotel
- 2014 World Soundtrack Award for Film Composer of the Year – Godzilla, The Grand Budapest Hotel, Marius, The Monuments Men, Philomena, Venus in Fur, and Zulu
- 2014 Sammy Film Music Award for Best New Film Score – The Grand Budapest Hotel
- 2016 Hollywood Music in Media Awards for Best Original Score – Animated Film - The Secret Life of Pets

=== Nominations ===
- 2004 European Film Award for Best Composer – Girl with a Pearl Earring
- 2005 Online Film Critics Society Award for Best Original Score – Birth
- 2006 Étoile d'Or for Best Music (Meilleure musique) – The Beat That My Heart Skipped
- 2006 Chicago Film Critics Association Award for Best Original Score – The Queen
- 2007 Chicago Film Critics Association Award for Best Original Score – Lust, Caution
- 2008 Étoile d'Or for Best Music (Meilleure musique) – L'ennemi intime
- 2008 Chicago Film Critics Association Award for Best Original Score – The Curious Case of Benjamin Button
- 2008 Broadcast Film Critics Association Award for Best Composer – Lust, Caution
- 2008 Asian Film Awards for Best Composer – Lust, Caution
- 2008 World Soundtrack Award for Film Composer of the Year – The Golden Compass
- 2009 Online Film Critics Society Award for Best Original Score – The Curious Case of Benjamin Button
- 2009 European Film Award for Best Composer – Coco Before Chanel
- 2009 Chicago Film Critics Association Award for Best Original Score – Fantastic Mr. Fox
- 2009 Central Ohio Film Critics Association Award for Best Score – The Curious Case of Benjamin Button
- 2009 Broadcast Film Critics Association Award for Best Composer – The Curious Case of Benjamin Button
- 2009 Saturn Award for Best Music – The Curious Case of Benjamin Button
- 2010 Online Film Critics Society Award for Best Original Score – Fantastic Mr. Fox
- 2010 IFMCA Award for Film Score of the Year – The King's Speech, The Ghost Writer
- 2010 IFMCA Award for Best Original Score for a Fantasy/Science Fiction/Horror Film – Harry Potter and the Deathly Hallows – Part 1
- 2010 IFMCA Award for Film Music Composition of the Year – Truth About Ruth from The Ghost Writer
- 2011 Hollywood Music in Media Award for Original Score-Feature Film – The Ides of March
- 2011 World Soundtrack Award for Best Original Film Score of the Year – The King's Speech
- 2011 Phoenix Film Critics Society Award for Best Original Score – Extremely Loud & Incredibly Close
- 2011 San Diego Film Critics Society Award for Best Score – The Tree of Life
- 2011 San Diego Film Critics Society Award for Best Score – Extremely Loud & Incredibly Close
- 2011 IFMCA Award for Film Composer of the Year
- 2011 IFMCA Award for Best Original Score for a Fantasy/Science Fiction/Horror Film – Harry Potter and the Deathly Hallows – Part 2
- 2012 World Soundtrack Award for Best Original Film Score of the Year – The Ides of March
- 2012 World Soundtrack Award for Film Composer of the Year
- 2012 18th Critics' Choice Awards for Best Score – Argo, Moonrise Kingdom
- 2013 World Soundtrack Award for Film Composer of the Year
- 2013 58th David di Donatello Award for Best Music (Migliore Musicista) – Reality
- 2015 Saturn Award for Best Music - Godzilla
- 2017 Annie Award for Best Music - The Secret Life of Pets
- 2017 International Film Music Critics Association for Best Original Score for a Comedy Film - The Secret Life of Pets
- 2018 Saturn Award for Best Music - The Shape of Water
