= 22nd César Awards =

1997 French film awards ceremony

- Date: 8 February 1997
- Site: Théâtre des Champs-Élysées, Paris, France
- Hosted by: Antoine de Caunes

Highlights
- Best Film: Ridicule
- Best Actor: Philippe Torreton
- Best Actress: Fanny Ardant

Television coverage
- Network: Canal+

The 22nd César Awards ceremony, presented by the Académie des Arts et Techniques du Cinéma, honoured the best French films of 1996 and took place on 8 February 1997 at the Théâtre des Champs-Élysées in Paris. The ceremony was chaired by Annie Girardot and hosted by Antoine de Caunes. Ridicule won the award for Best Film.

== Winners and nominees ==
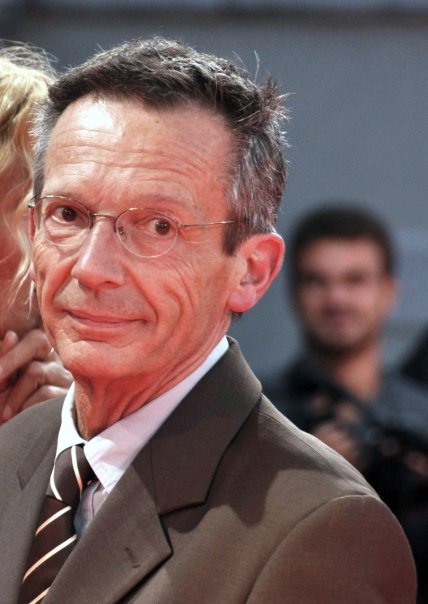
Patrice Leconte, Best Director winner

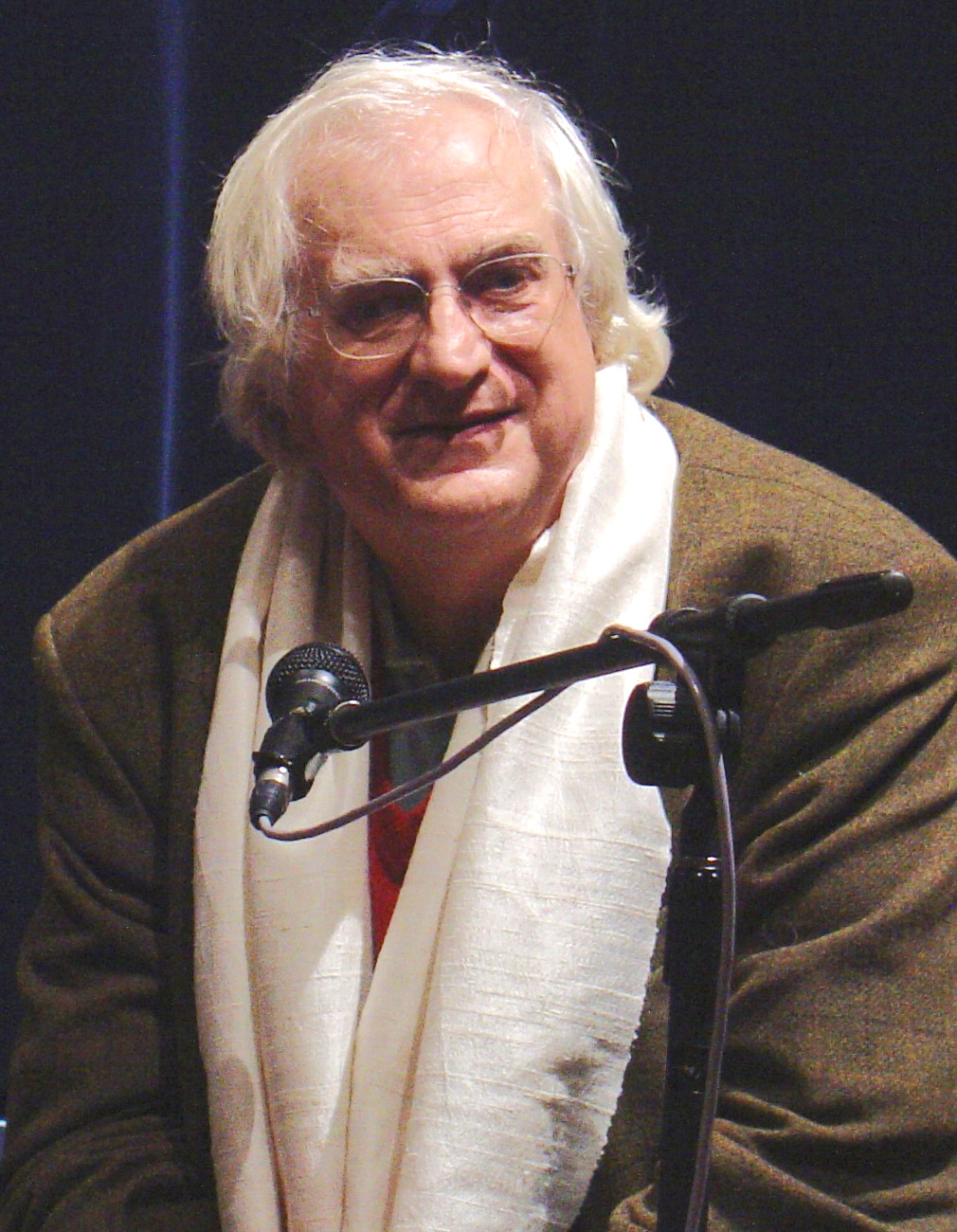
Bertrand Tavernier, Best Director winner

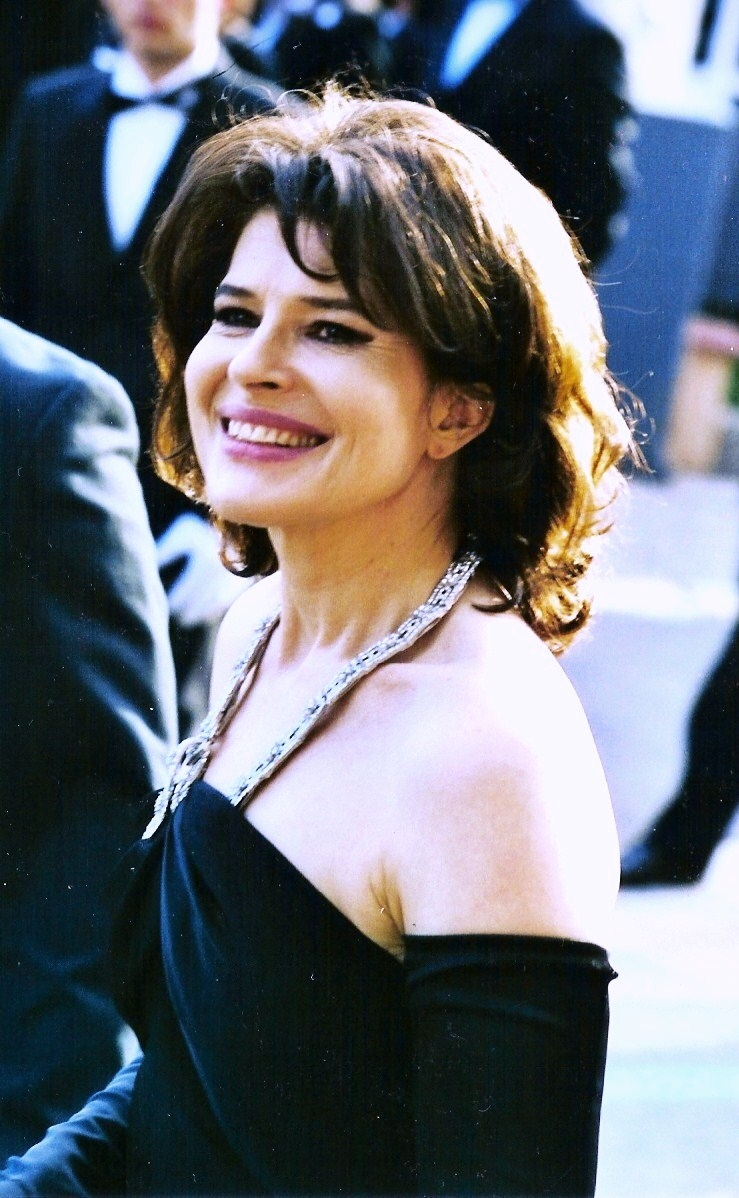
Fanny Ardant, Best Actress winner

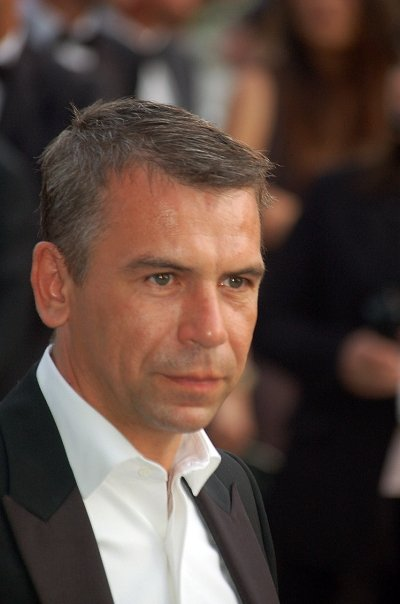
Philippe Torreton, Best Actor winner

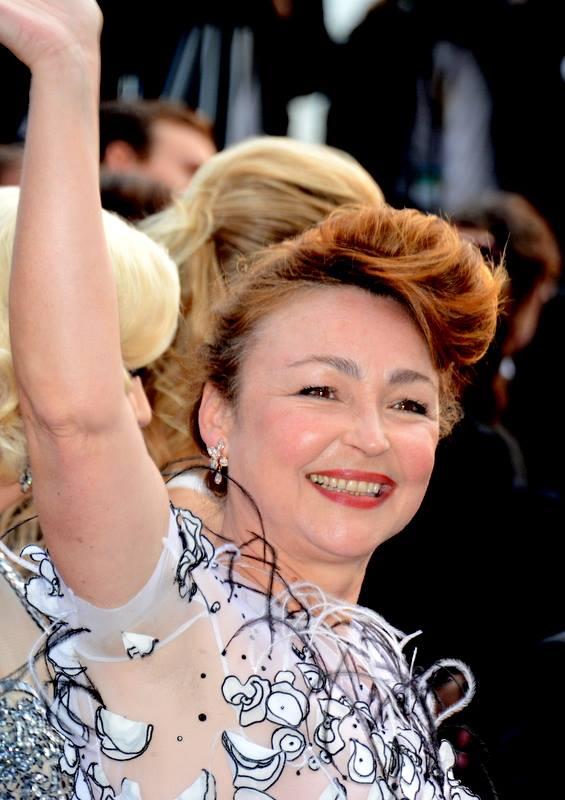
Catherine Frot, Best Supporting Actress winner

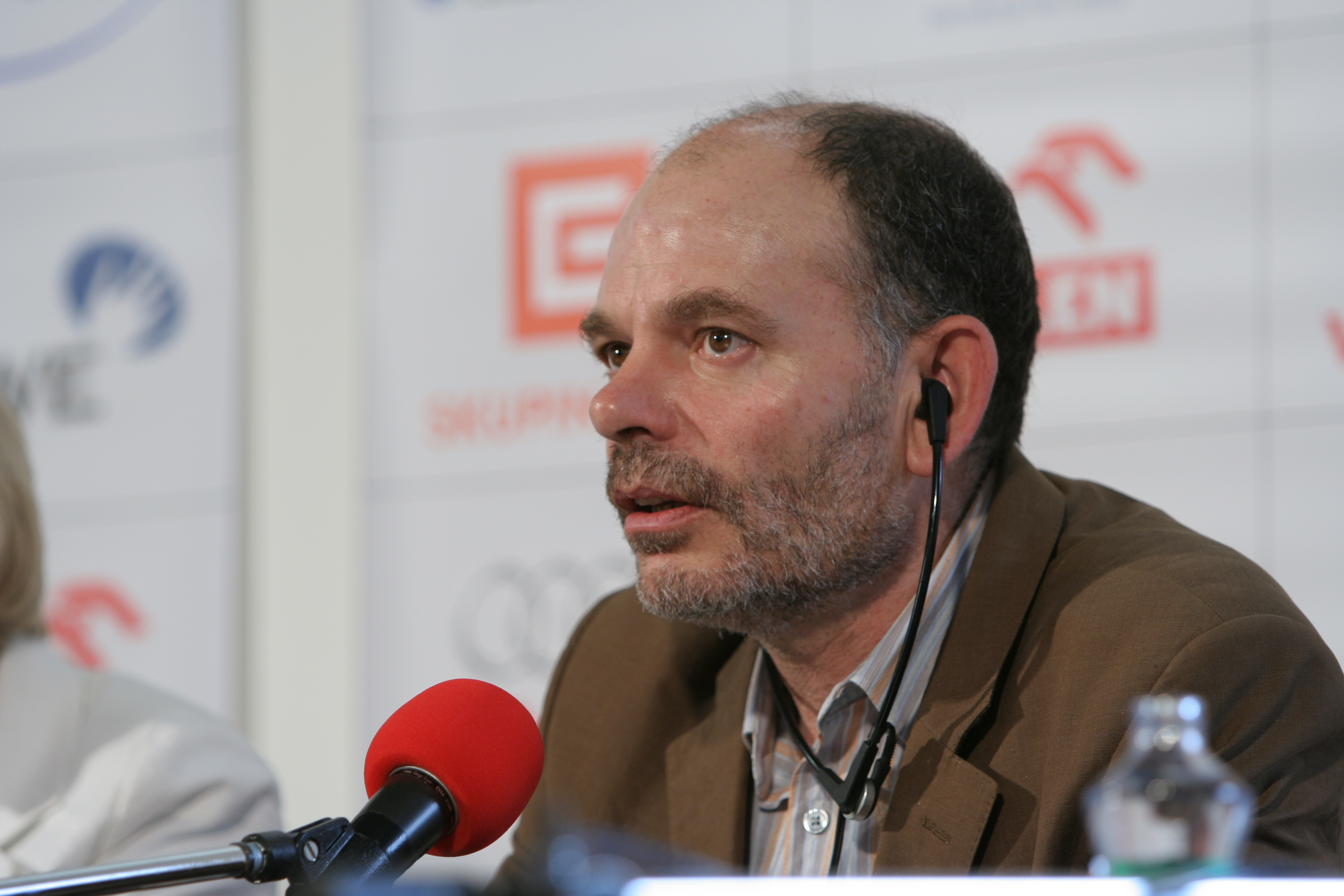
Jean-Pierre Darroussin, Best Supporting Actor winner

Best Film Ridicule: Captain Conan; Family Resemblances; Microcosmos; Pédale douce	Best Director (Tie) Patrice Leconte – Ridicule & Bertrand Tavernier – Captain Conan: Jacques Audiard – A Self Made Hero; Cédric Klapisch – Family Resemblances; André Téchiné – Thieves
Best Actor Philippe Torreton – Captain Conan: Daniel Auteuil – The Eighth Day; Charles Berling – Ridicule; Fabrice Luchini – Beaumarchais; Patrick Timsit – Pédale douce	Best Actress Fanny Ardant – Pédale douce: Catherine Deneuve – Thieves; Charlotte Gainsbourg – Love, etc.; Anouk Grinberg – My Man; Marie Trintignant – Le Cri de la soie
Best Supporting Actor Jean-Pierre Darroussin – Family Resemblances: Albert Dupontel – A Self Made Hero; Jacques Gamblin – Pédale douce; Bernard Giraudeau – Ridicule; Jean Rochefort – Ridicule	Best Supporting Actress Catherine Frot – Family Resemblances: Agnès Jaoui – Family Resemblances; Sandrine Kiberlain – A Self Made Hero; Michèle Laroque – Pédale douce; Valeria Bruni Tedeschi – My Man
Most Promising Actor Mathieu Amalric – My Sex Life... or How I Got into an Argument: Samuel Le Bihan – Captain Conan; Benoît Magimel – Thieves; Bruno Putzulu – Les Aveux de l'innocent; Philippe Torreton – Captain Conan	Most Promising Actress Laurence Côte – Thieves: Monica Bellucci – The Apartment; Garance Clavel – When the Cat's Away; Jeanne Balibar – My Sex Life... or How I Got into an Argument; Emmanuelle Devos – My Sex Life... or How I Got into an Argument
Best Original Screenplay or Adaptation Family Resemblances – Jean-Pierre Bacri, Cédric Klapisch and Agnès Jaoui: Captain Conan – Jean Cosmos and Bertrand Tavernier; Ridicule – Rémi Waterhouse; A Self Made Hero – Jacques Audiard and Alain Le Henry; Pédale douce – Gabriel Aghion and Patrick Timsit	Best First Feature Film Will It Snow for Christmas?: The Apartment; Bernie; Microcosmos; Encore
Best Cinematography Claude Nuridsany and Marie Pérennou – Microcosmos: Thierry Arbogast – Ridicule; Jean-Marie Dreujou – Unpredictable Nature of the River	Best Editing Florence Ricard and Marie-Josèphe Yoyotte – Microcosmos: Joëlle Hache – Ridicule; Juliette Welfling – A Self Made Hero
Best Sound Philippe Barbeau, Bernard Leroux and Laurent Quaglio – Microcosmos: Michel Desrois and Gérard Lamps – Captain Conan; Jean Goudier, Dominique Hennequin and Paul Lainé – Ridicule	Best Original Music Bruno Coulais – Microcosmos: Antoine Duhamel – Ridicule; Alexandre Desplat – A Self Made Hero; René-Marc Bini – Unpredictable Nature of the River
Best Costume Design Christian Gasc – Ridicule: Sylvie de Segonzac – Beaumarchais; Agnès Evein and Jacqueline Moreau – Captain Conan	Best Production Design Ivan Maussion – Ridicule: Jean-Marc Kerdelhue – Beaumarchais; Guy-Claude François – Captain Conan
Best Short Film Madame Jacques on the Croisette: Dialogue au sommet; Un taxi Aouzou; A Summer Dress; Une visite	Best Foreign Film Breaking the Waves: Fargo; La Promesse; Secrets & Lies; Il Postino: The Postman
Best Producer Jacques Perrin: Humbert Balsan; Charles Gassot; Alain Sarde
Honorary César Charles Aznavour; Andie MacDowell

== See also ==
- 69th Academy Awards
- 50th British Academy Film Awards
- 9th European Film Awards
- 2nd Lumière Awards
