= Juliette Welfling =

French film editor (born 1956)

- Born: 1956 (age 68–69)
- Occupation: Film editor

Juliette Welfling is a French film editor. She has been nominated for two Academy Awards for Best Film Editing for her work in the 2007 movie The Diving Bell and the Butterfly, and the 2024 movie Emilia Pérez. She has received the César Award for Best Editing for her work on this film as well as for five Jacques Audiard films: Regarde les hommes tomber (1994), The Beat That My Heart Skipped (2005), A Prophet (2009), Rust and Bone (2012), and The Sisters Brothers (2018).

== Filmography ==
Feature films

- See How They Fall (1994)
- A Self Made Hero (1996)
- Déjà mort (1998)
- Read My Lips (2001)
- Aram (2002)
- The Beat That My Heart Skipped (2005)
- The Science of Sleep (2006)
- I Do (2006)
- The Diving Bell and the Butterfly (2007)
- A Simple Heart (2008)
- A Prophet (2009)
- The Big Picture (2010)
- Miral (2010)
- Love and Bruises (2011)
- Rust and Bone (2012)
- The Hunger Games (2012)
- The Past (2013)
- Far from Men (2014)
- Dheepan (2015)
- Free State of Jones (2016)
- Ocean's 8 (2018)
- The Sisters Brothers (2018)
- Paris, 13th District (2021)
- The Sisters Brothers (2018)
- Mother's Instinct (2024)
- Emilia Pérez (2024)
