= Alix Raynaud =

French executive and line producer

- Born: 28 October 1974 (age 51)
- Occupation: Producer
- Known for: Rust and Bone, A Prophet, Read My Lips

Alix Raynaud (born 28 October 1974) is a French executive producer and line producer.

== Early life ==
In 1998, Raynaud is graduated from business school ESCP Europe of Paris.

== Filmography ==
- Read My Lips (Sur mes lèvres) (2001) (producer)
- Love Street (Rue des plaisirs) (2002) (line producer)
- A Prophet (Un prophète (2009) (co-producer)
- Rust and Bone (De Rouille et d'Os) (2012) (co-producer)

== Awards ==
- BAFTA Award - Best Film Not in the English Language for A Prophet.
