= See How They Fall =

1994 French film by Jacques Audiard

- Theatrical release poster
- Directed by: Jacques Audiard
- Written by: Jacques Audiard; Alain Le Henry
- Based on: "Triangle" by Teri White
- Starring: Jean-Louis Trintignant; Jean Yanne; Mathieu Kassovitz
- Cinematography: Gérard Stérin
- Edited by: Juliette Welfling
- Music by: Alexandre Desplat
- Distributed by: Pan-Européenne Distribution
- Release date: 31 August 1994
- Running time: 90 minutes
- Country: France
- Language: French
- Budget: €3 million

See How They Fall (French: Regarde les hommes tomber) is a 1994 film directed by Jacques Audiard. It stars Jean-Louis Trintignant, Jean Yanne and Mathieu Kassovitz. It won three César Awards for Best First Work, Best Editing and Most Promising Actor in 1995.

== Plot ==
Simon, a sales representative, tries to track down the people who shot his friend Mickey, a police officer.

== Cast ==
- Jean-Louis Trintignant as Marx
- Jean Yanne as Simon
- Mathieu Kassovitz as Johnny
- Bulle Ogier as Louise
- Christine Pascal as Sandrine
