= Sport de filles =

- Directed by: Patricia Mazuy
- Written by: Simon Reggiani
- Produced by: Grégoire Debailly; Gilles Sandoz
- Starring: Marina Hands; Bruno Ganz; Josiane Balasko
- Cinematography: Caroline Champetier
- Edited by: Mathilde Muyard
- Music by: John Cale
- Production company: Lazennec Films
- Release dates: 18 October 2011 (La Roche-sur-Yon Film Festival); 25 January 2012 (France)
- Running time: 101 minutes
- Country: France
- Language: French
- Budget: $4.2 million
- Box office: $655.000

Sport de filles is a 2011 drama film directed by Patricia Mazuy. Original music for this film was composed by John Cale, who had previously worked with Mazuy on her 2000 film Saint-Cyr.

== Cast ==
- Marina Hands as Gracieuse
- Bruno Ganz as Franz Mann
- Josiane Balasko as Joséphine de Silène
- Amanda Harlech as Susan
- Isabel Karajan as Alice
- Olivier Perrier as Gracieuse's father
- Lionel Dray as Jacky
- Muftie Alpin as Mina
- Chiara De Luca as Luisa

== Production ==
The film includes scenes shot in Gacé (Orne).
