= Alexandre Desplat =

French film composer (born 1961)

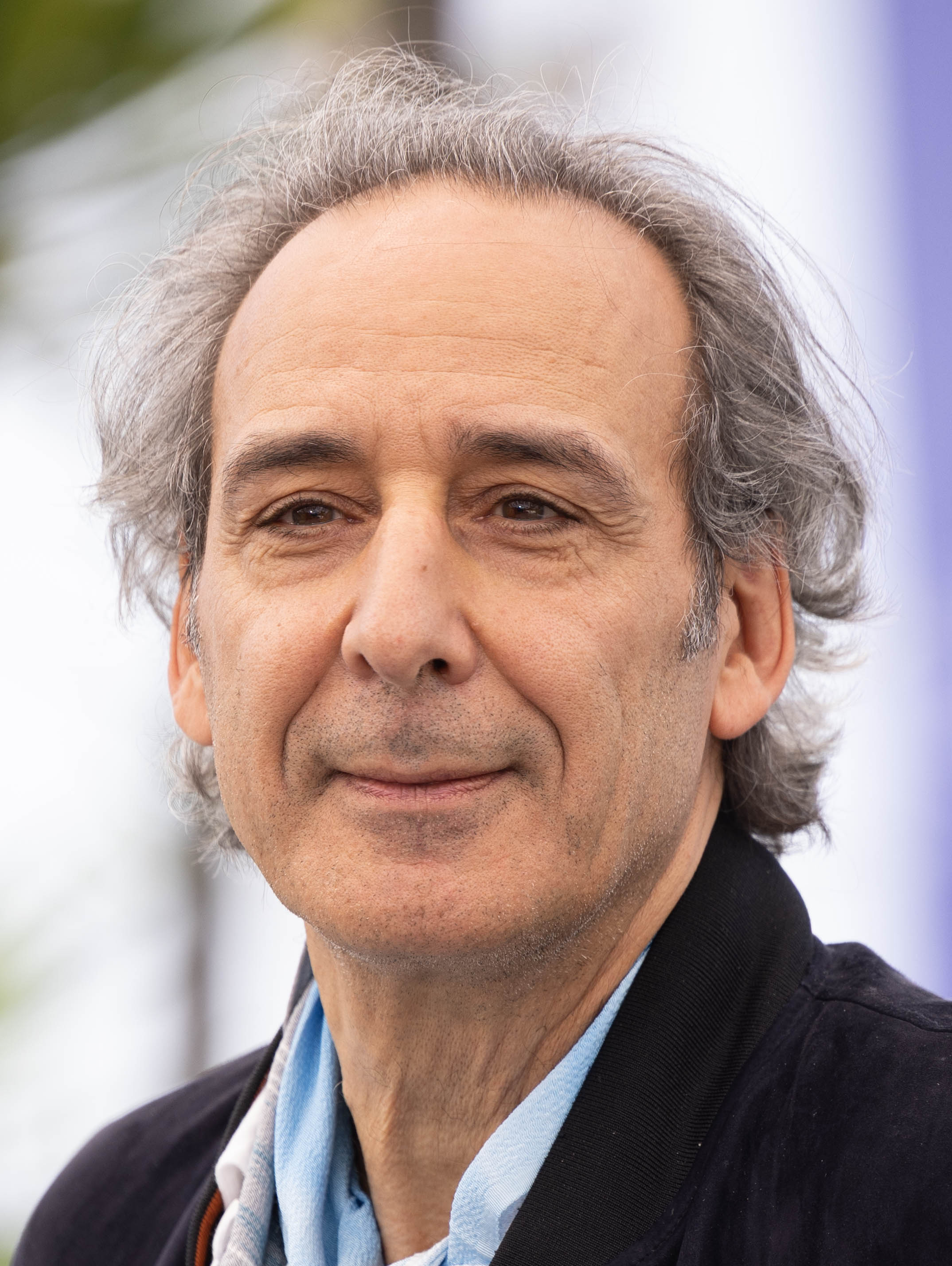
- Desplat at the 2025 Cannes Film Festival

Background information
- Born: Alexandre Michel Gérard Desplat; 23 August 1961 (age 65); Paris, France
- Genres: Film score, contemporary classical, jazz
- Occupations: Composer, orchestrator, conductor
- Instruments: Piano, trumpet, flute
- Spouse: Dominique Lemonnier
- Website: Alexandredesplat.net

Alexandre Michel Gérard Desplat (French: [alɛksɑ̃dʁ(ə) dɛspla]; born 23 August 1961) is a French film composer and conductor. He has received numerous accolades, including two Academy Awards, three BAFTA Awards, two Golden Globe Awards, and two Grammy Awards. Desplat was made an Officer of the Ordre national du Mérite and a Commander of the Ordre des Arts et des Lettres both in 2016.

Desplat has received two Academy Awards for Best Original Score for The Grand Budapest Hotel (2014) and The Shape of Water (2017). He was Oscar-nominated for The Queen (2006), The Curious Case of Benjamin Button (2008), Fantastic Mr. Fox (2009), The King's Speech (2010), Argo (2012), Philomena (2013), The Imitation Game (2014), Isle of Dogs (2018), and Little Women (2019).

Desplat has composed scores for a wide range of films, including low-budget independent productions and large-scale blockbusters, such as The Golden Compass (2007), The Twilight Saga: New Moon (2009), Harry Potter and the Deathly Hallows – Part 1 (2010) & Part 2 (2011), Moonrise Kingdom (2012), Zero Dark Thirty (2012), Godzilla (2014), Unbroken (2014), The French Dispatch (2021), Guillermo del Toro's Pinocchio (2022), Jurassic World Rebirth (2025), and Frankenstein (2025). He has collaborated with directors such as Wes Anderson, Chris Weitz, Terrence Malick, George Clooney, Roman Polanski, Guillermo del Toro and Gareth Edwards.

== Early life and education ==
Alexandre Desplat was born in Paris. His father, Jacques Desplat, was a Frenchman originally from Sarlat-la-Canéda. His mother, Katie Ladopoulou, is a Greek poet originally from Athens. Desplat's parents had met in the United States while they were both students at the University of California, Berkeley. They married in San Francisco and returned to France, settling in Paris. Alexandre has two older sisters, Marie-Christine (also known as Kiki) and Rosalinda.

Desplat began playing the piano at the age of five. He later picked up the trumpet, before switching to flute at nine. Desplat's musical interests were wide, ranging from French composers such as Maurice Ravel and Claude Debussy, to jazz and world music. He developed an early appreciation for film music, courtesy of the movie soundtracks his parents brought back from the United States. He began collecting Bernard Herrmann's Hitchcock soundtracks as a teen and eventually decided to pursue a career as a film composer after hearing John Williams's Star Wars score in 1977. Other early sources of Desplat's inspiration include the music of Maurice Jarre, Nino Rota and Georges Delerue.

Desplat studied at the Royal College of Music and the Conservatoire de Paris under Claude Ballif. During this period, he also took a summer course under Iannis Xenakis. Desplat also studied under Jack Hayes in Los Angeles.

When recording the music for his first film, he met violinist Dominique Lemonnier, who became his favorite soloist and artistic director. They later married.

Desplat has worked on many films since the 1990s. His big Hollywood break came in 2003 with the soundtrack for the film Girl with a Pearl Earring, a drama set in 17th-century Delft exploring a fictional muse of Vermeer.

== Career ==
=== 1990–2009 ===
Desplat has composed extensively for French cinema, Hollywood, and incidental music for over 100 films, including Lapse of Memory (1992), Family Express (1992), Regarde Les Hommes Tomber (1994), Les Péchés Mortels (1995), César-nominated Un Héros Très Discret (1996), Une Minute de Silence (1998), Sweet Revenge (1998), Le Château des Singes (1999), Reines d'un Jour (2001), the César-nominated Sur mes lèvres (2002), Rire et Châtiment (2003), Syriana (2005), the César-winner The Beat That My Heart Skipped (2005), The Queen (2006), Fantastic Mr. Fox (2009), Harry Potter and the Deathly Hallows – Part 1 (2010), The Ghost Writer (2010), Daniel Auteuil's remake of La Fille du Puisatier (2011), Harry Potter and the Deathly Hallows – Part 2 (2011) and The Grand Budapest Hotel (2014).

Desplat has composed individual songs that have been sung in films by such artists as Akhenaton, Kate Beckinsale, Charlotte Gainsbourg, Valérie Lemercier, Miosotis and Catherine Ringer. He has also written music for the theatre, including pieces performed at the Comédie Française. Desplat has conducted performances of his music played by the London Symphony Orchestra, the Royal Philharmonic Orchestra and the Munich Symphony Orchestra. Desplat has also given Master Classes at La Sorbonne in Paris and the Royal College of Music in London.

In 2007, he composed the scores for Philip Pullman's Golden Compass; Zach Helm's BAFTA nominated directorial debut Mr. Magorium's Wonder Emporium with American composer Aaron Zigman; and the Ang Lee movie Lust, Caution. Prior to these break-out works, he contributed scores for The Luzhin Defence, Girl with a Pearl Earring, Syriana, Birth, Hostage, Casanova and The Nest.

For The Painted Veil, he won the Golden Globe Award for Best Original Score, Los Angeles Film Critics Association Award for Best Music, and the 2006 World Soundtrack Award. He won the 2007 BMI Film Music Award, 2007 World Soundtrack Award, 2007 European Film Award, and received his first Academy Award nomination for Best Original Score for The Queen. He also won the Silver Berlin Bear at the Berlin Film Festival for Best Film Music in The Beat that My Heart Skipped. In 2008, Desplat received his second Oscar nomination for David Fincher's Curious Case of Benjamin Button. Desplat received his third Oscar nomination and a BAFTA nomination for Fantastic Mr. Fox in 2010, both of which were won by Michael Giacchino for Up.

Desplat has composed music for Largo Winch, based on the Belgian comic; Afterwards a French-Canadian psychological thriller film directed by Gilles Bourdos in English; Anne Fontaine's Coco avant Chanel, based on the life of designer Coco Chanel; Robert Guédiguian's L'Armée du Crime; Cheri, reuniting him with director Stephen Frears, whom he collaborated with on The Queen; Un Prophète reuniting with director Jacques Audiard; Julie & Julia directed by Nora Ephron; Fantastic Mr. Fox, directed by Wes Anderson and based on the novel by Roald Dahl; New Moon, directed by Chris Weitz; Roman Polanski's Ghost Writer; Tamara Drewe; The Special Relationship; and The King's Speech which earned Desplat his fourth Oscar nomination.

=== 2010–2019 ===
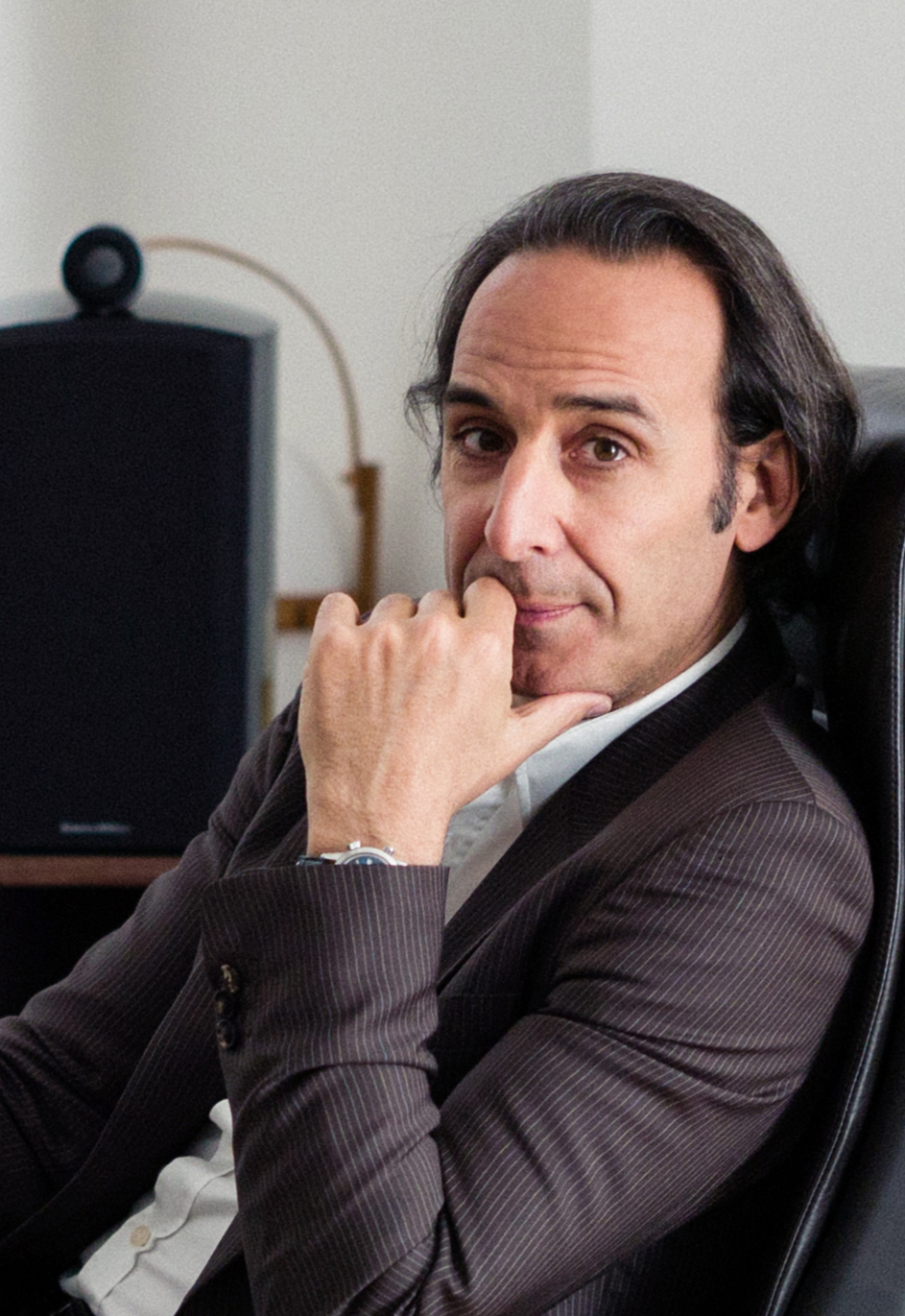
Desplat in 2015

In early 2011, Desplat began to write the music to Harry Potter and the Deathly Hallows – Part 2, which would earn him a nomination for Grammy Award for Best Score Soundtrack for Visual Media at the 54th Annual Grammy Awards. He reunited with director David Yates, who offered Desplat the opportunity to score the second part after his work on the Part 1 soundtrack in 2010 "enchanted everyone in the control room". Desplat's soundtrack sequel to the 2008 film Largo Winch was released in 2011 and was well received. Desplat's 2011 projects included The Tree of Life, directed by Terrence Malick (which he actually recorded in early 2010), A Better Life, La Fille du Puisatier, Roman Polanski's Carnage, George Clooney's Ides of March, and the logo for the French film company StudioCanal.

Desplat started 2012 with Extremely Loud and Incredibly Close, the Florent Emilio Siri-directed biopic Cloclo, and DreamWorks Animation's Rise of the Guardians. His other scores of 2013 included Rust and Bone, Zero Dark Thirty, and Argo, the latter of which earned him Oscar, Golden Globe and BAFTA nominations.

In June 2013, Desplat's first Concerto for Flute & Orchestra premiered in France with flautist Jean Ferrandis and the Orchestre National des Pays de la Loire conducted by John Axelrod. His Trois Etudes for piano originally written for pianist Lang Lang had its U.S. premiere in October 2013 played by pianist Gloria Cheng. He received a sixth Oscar nomination for his score to Philomena, which marked his fourth collaboration with director Stephen Frears.

On 23 June 2014, it was announced that Desplat would head the jury at the 71st Venice International Film Festival. He wrote five major scores during 2014, with The Grand Budapest Hotel winning him his first Academy Award. His score for The Imitation Game was also nominated, and his win therefore marked the first time a composer had won against another of their own scores since John Williams won for Star Wars (beating Close Encounters of the Third Kind) in 1978, and only the seventh time overall (Alfred Newman, Bernard Herrmann, Max Steiner, Miklos Rozsa and Johnny Green are the only other composers to achieve this).

On 16 March 2015, It was announced that Desplat would be composing the first anthology film of the new Disney Star Wars films, called Rogue One. In September 2016, he stepped down due to the reshoots of the film that left him unavailable, and was then replaced by Michael Giacchino.

In 2018, he won his second Academy Award for The Shape of Water and premiered a new work for solo flute played by Emmanuel Pahud.

== Personal life ==
Desplat is married to violinist Dominique "Solre" Lemonnier. They have two daughters, Antonia and Ninon. Desplat has studios both in Los Angeles and Paris and makes his home in the latter city.

== Filmography ==
=== Films ===
Year	Film	Director
1985	Le Pays de Guillaume Tell	Nick Hayek Jr.
1985	Le Souffleur	Frank Le Wita
1986	Ki lo sa?	Robert Guédiguian
1991	Family Express	Nick Hayek Jr.
1991	Mémoire traquée	Patrick Dewolf
1992	Au nom du pére et du fils	Patrice Noïa
1992	Sexes faibles!	Serge Meynard
1993	Le Tronc	Karl Zéro; Bernard Faroux
1993	The Hour of the Pig	Leslie Megahey
1994	See How They Fall	Jacques Audiard
1995	Marie-Louise ou la Permission	Manuel Flèche
1995	Innocent Lies	Patrick Dewolf
1995	Les Milles	Sébastien Grall
1995	Those Were the Days	Didier Haudepin
1996	A Self-Made Hero	Jacques Audiard
1996	Love, etc.	Marion Vernoux
1996	Le Montreur de Boxe - Lucky Punch	Dominique Ladoge
1996	Le Cri de la soie	Yvon Marciano
1996	Passage à l'acte	Francis Girod
1997	Sous les pieds des femmes	Rachida Krim
1997	La femme du cosmonaute	Jacques Monnet
1998	Sweet Revenge	Malcolm Mowbray
1998	Atilano for President	Santiago Aguilar; Luis Guridi
1998	Une chance sur deux	Patrice Leconte
1998	Une minute de silence	Florent-Emilio Siri
1998	Restons groupés	Jean-Paul Salomé
1999	A Monkey's Tale	Jean-François Laguionie
1999	Empty Days	Marion Vernoux
1999	Toni	Philomène Esposito
1999	C'est pas ma faute!	Jacques Monnet
1999	Monsieur Naphtali	Olivier Schatzky
2000	The Luzhin Defence	Marleen Gorris
2000	Amazon	Philippe de Broca
2000	Long Live Us!	Camille de Casabianca
2001	A Hell of a Day	Marion Vernoux
2001	Read My Lips	Jacques Audiard
2001	Barnie et ses petites contrariétés	Bruno Chiche
2001	Les Portes de la gloire	Christian Merret-Palmair
2001	Mauvais Genres	Francis Girod
2002	Tous les chagrins se ressemblent	Luc Béraud
2002	Paroles d'étoiles (Note: Documentary film)	Thomas Gilou
2002	11′09″01 September 11 (Note: Composed the title music.)	Various
2002	The Nest	Florent-Emilio Siri
2003	Girl with a Pearl Earring	Peter Webber
2003	Rire et châtiment	Isabelle Doval
2003	Les baisers des autres (Note: Short film)	Carine Tardieu
2003	Le pacte du silence	Graham Guit
2003	Virus au paradis	Olivier Langlois
2003	Eager Bodies	Xavier Giannoli
2003	Les beaux jours	Jean-Pierre Sinapi
2003	A Sight for Sore Eyes	Gilles Bourdos
2003	Stormy Weather	Sólveig Anspach
2003	Tristan	Philippe Harel
2004	Birth	Jonathan Glazer
2004	Le pays des enfants perdus	Francis Girod
2004	The Corsican File	Alain Berbérian
2005	The Upside of Anger	Mike Binder
2005	Hostage	Florent-Emilio Siri
2005	Casanova	Lasse Hallström
2005	Syriana	Stephen Gaghan
2005	Tu vas rire, mais je te quitte	Philippe Harel
2005	The Beat That My Heart Skipped	Jacques Audiard
2005	Une aventure	Xavier Giannoli
2006	The Alibi	Matt Checkowski; Kurt Mattila
2006	Firewall	Richard Loncraine
2006	The Queen	Stephen Frears
2006	The Painted Veil	John Curran
2006	The Valet	Francis Veber
2006	When I Was a Singer	Xavier Giannoli
2007	Lust, Caution	Ang Lee
2007	Mr. Magorium's Wonder Emporium (Note: with Aaron Zigman)	Zach Helm
2007	The Golden Compass	Chris Weitz
2007	Intimate Enemies	Florent-Emilio Siri
2007	Michou d'Auber	Thomas Gilou
2007	Ségo et Sarko sont dans un bateau	Karl Zéro; Michel Royer
2008	Afterwards	Gilles Bourdos
2008	The Curious Case of Benjamin Button	David Fincher
2008	Largo Winch	Jérôme Salle
2009	Julie & Julia	Nora Ephron
2009	Chéri	Stephen Frears
2009	Fantastic Mr. Fox	Wes Anderson
2009	The Twilight Saga: New Moon	Chris Weitz
2009	Coco Before Chanel	Anne Fontaine
2009	A Prophet	Jacques Audiard
2009	The Army of Crime	Robert Guédiguian
2010	The Ghost Writer	Roman Polanski
2010	The Special Relationship	Richard Loncraine
2010	Tamara Drewe	Stephen Frears
2010	Harry Potter and the Deathly Hallows – Part 1 (Note: Original themes by John Williams)	David Yates
2010	The King's Speech	Tom Hooper
2011	The Tree of Life	Terrence Malick
2011	A Better Life	Chris Weitz
2011	Harry Potter and the Deathly Hallows – Part 2 (Note: Original themes by John Williams)	David Yates
2011	The Ides of March	George Clooney
2011	Carnage	Roman Polanski
2011	My Week with Marilyn (Note: Composed "Marilyn's Theme")	Simon Curtis
2011	Extremely Loud and Incredibly Close	Stephen Daldry
2011	The Well-Digger's Daughter	Daniel Auteuil
2011	Largo Winch II	Jérôme Salle
2012	Moonrise Kingdom	Wes Anderson
2012	A Therapy	Roman Polanski
2012	Argo	Ben Affleck
2012	Rise of the Guardians	Peter Ramsey
2012	Zero Dark Thirty	Kathryn Bigelow
2012	My Way	Florent-Emilio Siri
2012	Reality	Matteo Garrone
2012	Renoir	Gilles Bourdos
2012	Rust and Bone	Jacques Audiard
2013	Zulu	Jérôme Salle
2013	Venus in Fur	Roman Polanski
2013	Philomena	Stephen Frears
2013	Marius	Daniel Auteuil
2013	Fanny	Daniel Auteuil
2014	The Monuments Men	George Clooney
2014	The Grand Budapest Hotel	Wes Anderson
2014	Godzilla	Gareth Edwards
2014	The Imitation Game	Morten Tyldum
2014	Unbroken	Angelina Jolie
2015	Tale of Tales	Matteo Garrone
2015	Every Thing Will Be Fine	Wim Wenders
2015	The Danish Girl	Tom Hooper
2015	Suffragette	Sarah Gavron
2015	Suite Française (Note: Composed "Bruno's Piano Piece")	Saul Dibb
2015	Don't Tell Me the Boy Was Mad	Robert Guédiguian
2016	Alone in Berlin	Vincent Pérez
2016	Florence Foster Jenkins	Stephen Frears
2016	The Secret Life of Pets	Chris Renaud
2016	The Light Between Oceans	Derek Cianfrance
2016	American Pastoral	Ewan McGregor
2016	Les Habitants	Raymond Depardon
2016	The Odyssey	Jérôme Salle
2016	Heal the Living	Katell Quillévéré
2017	Valerian and the City of a Thousand Planets	Luc Besson
2017	The Shape of Water	Guillermo del Toro
2017	Suburbicon	George Clooney
2017	Based on a True Story	Roman Polanski
2017	12 Days	Raymond Depardon
2017	Endangered Species	Gilles Bourdos
2018	Isle of Dogs	Wes Anderson
2018	Operation Finale	Chris Weitz
2018	The Sisters Brothers	Jacques Audiard
2018	Kursk	Thomas Vinterberg
2019	The Secret Life of Pets 2	Chris Renaud
2019	Little Women	Greta Gerwig
2019	An Officer and a Spy	Roman Polanski
2019	Adults in the Room	Costa-Gavras
2020	The Midnight Sky	George Clooney
2021	The French Dispatch	Wes Anderson
2021	Eiffel	Martin Bourboulon
2022	The Outfit	Graham Moore
2022	The Lost King	Stephen Frears
2022	Pinocchio	Guillermo del Toro
2022	Final Cut	Michel Hazanavicius
2022	Lui	Guillaume Canet
2022	Father & Soldier	Mathieu Vadepied
2023	Asteroid City (Note: Composed six score tracks)	Wes Anderson
2023	The Palace	Roman Polanski
2023	Nyad	Elizabeth Chai Vasarhelyi Jimmy Chin
2023	The Boys in the Boat	George Clooney
2023	Lee	Ellen Kuras
2024	The Most Precious of Cargoes	Michel Hazanavicius
2024	The Piano Lesson	Malcolm Washington
2024	Unstoppable	William Goldenberg
2025	The Phoenician Scheme	Wes Anderson
2025	Jurassic World Rebirth (Note: Replaced Michael Giacchino) (Note: Original Jurassic Park themes by John Williams)	Gareth Edwards
2025	Frankenstein	Guillermo del Toro
2025	The Incredible Shrinking Man	Jan Kounen
2025	Eagles of the Republic	Tarik Saleh
2026	The Social Reckoning (Note: Replaced Trent Reznor and Atticus Ross)	Aaron Sorkin

=== Television series ===
Year	Film	Director
2016	Marseille	Florent-Emilio Siri; Thomas Gilou; Laïla Marrakchi
2016	Trollhunters: Tales of Arcadia (Note: Composed "Hero Theme", "Dark Theme" with Tim Davies)	Various
2024	The Regime	Stephen Frears; Jessica Hobbs

== Accolades ==
Desplat has received many awards and nominations for his work including two Academy Awards, three BAFTA Awards, three César Awards, and two Golden Globe Awards.

=== Decorations ===
- Officer of the Ordre national du Mérite (2016)
- Commander of the Order of Arts and Letters (2016)
- Chevalier of the Legion of Honour (2011)
