= Olivier Perrier =

French actor (born 1940)

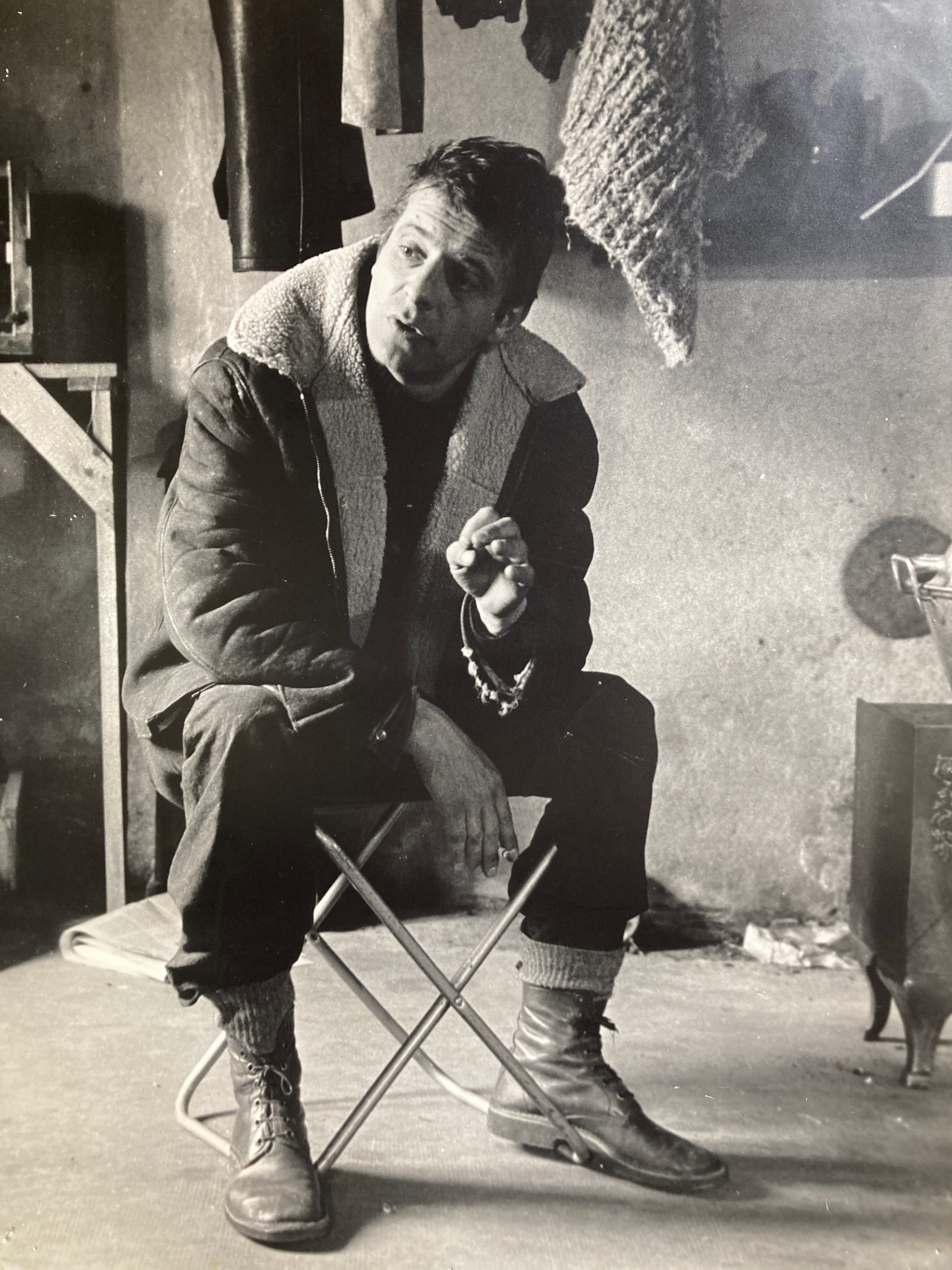
- Born: 15 September 1940 (age 85); Hérisson, France
- Occupation: Actor
- Years active: 1972-present

Olivier Perrier (born 15 September 1940) is a French actor. He appeared in more than forty films since 1972.

== Selected filmography ==
Year	Title	Role	Notes
2000	Sentimental Destinies		
2001	Read My Lips	Masson	
2006	Blame It on Fidel		
2008	Anything for Her		
2010	Of Gods and Men	Bruno	
2011	Sport de filles		
