= Pirappan Valasai =

- Village
- Location in Tamil Nadu, India Pirappan Valasai (India)
- Coordinates: 9.29537°N 79.03862°E
- Country: India
- State: Tamil Nadu
- District: Ramanathapuram

Population (2011)
  - Total: 4,406

Languages
  - Official: Tamil
- Time zone: UTC+5:30 (IST)
- PIN: 623516
- Telephone code: 4576
- Vehicle registration: TN 65

Pirappan Valasai is a village in Mandapam block in Ramanathapuram District of Tamil Nadu, India.

== Geography ==
It is in the region of Gulf of Mannar in Bay of Bengal. It is located 36 km towards East from District headquarters Ramanathapuram, 9 km from Mandapam. It is 30 km before the temple town of Rameshwaram.

== Demographics ==
=== Population ===
According to the 2011 Census of India the village had a population of 4,406. With the male population of 2,248 and 2,158 females.

=== Languages ===
Tamil language is the local language here. English is taught in schools.

== Government and politics ==
It is a part of Ramanathapuram (Lok Sabha constituency).

=== Civic Utility / Amenities / Services ===
Pirappan Valasai Pin code is 623516 and postal head office is Irumeni.

== Economy ==
The main occupation of the community is fishing.

== Culture/Cityscape ==
Movie Dheepan was shot in this village.

== Transport ==
=== By Air ===
The nearest airport is Madurai Airport.

=== By Rail ===
Pirappanvalasai (PPVL) Railway Station is located in the area. All the trains going to Rameshwaram railway station go through this station. There are around 47 trains passing through this station every week.

=== By Road ===
Ramanathapuram, Rameswaram, Paramakudi and Sivaganga are the nearby Cities to Pirappan Valasai.
