= Dheepan =

2015 film

- Theatrical release poster
- Directed by: Jacques Audiard
- Screenplay by: Jacques Audiard; Thomas Bidegain; Noé Debré
- Story by: Jacques Audiard Antonythasan Jesuthasan (uncredited)
- Produced by: Pascal Caucheteux; Jacques Audiard (uncredited)
- Starring: Antonythasan Jesuthasan; Kalieaswari Srinivasan; Claudine Vinasithamby
- Cinematography: Eponine Momenceau
- Edited by: Juliette Welfling
- Music by: Nicolas Jaar
- Production companies: Why Not Productions; Page 114; France 2 Cinéma
- Distributed by: UGC Distribution
- Release dates: 21 May 2015 (Cannes); 26 August 2015 (France)
- Running time: 115 minutes
- Country: France
- Languages: Tamil; French; English
- Budget: €8 million
- Box office: $4.9 million

Dheepan is a 2015 French crime drama film directed by Jacques Audiard and co-written by Audiard, Thomas Bidegain, and Noé Debré. The film was partly inspired by Montesquieu's Persian Letters, as well as the 1971 film Straw Dogs, with guidance from Antonythasan Jesuthasan, who stars as the title character, alongside newcomers Kalieaswari Srinivasan and Claudine Vinasithamby.

The film tells the story of three Tamil refugees who flee the civil war-ravaged Sri Lanka and come to France, in the hope of reconstructing their lives. The film won the Palme d'Or at the 2015 Cannes Film Festival. It was later shown in the Special Presentations section of the 2015 Toronto International Film Festival.

== Plot ==
Sivadhasan is a Tamil Tiger soldier during the last days of the Sri Lankan Civil War. After the armed conflict resolves, his side loses, and he is forced to move to a refugee camp. There he decides to move to France to take a fresh chance at life. However, in order to secure political asylum, he requires a convincing cover story. He is given the passport of a dead man, Dheepan Natarajan, and pairs with people he barely knows, posing as his family. Along with his supposed wife, Yalini, and his supposed 9-year-old daughter, Illayaal, they get on a ship bound for Paris.

Upon arrival, he lands a job as a resident caretaker and starts building a new life in a banlieue housing project named Le Pré. He winds up as a caretaker of a rough housing project controlled by drug dealers (filmed on location in the peaceful project of La Coudraie, in the suburban city of Poissy). The new home turns out to be another conflict zone for him. Shootouts between rival drug gangs terrify Yalini and Illayaal as they try to fit into their roles as mother and daughter. Yalini is pressured to accept a job as a nurse-maid to the father of the local drug lord.

Sivadhasan attends to his duties in spite of the chaos that surrounds him but is drawn into the fight. Caught in the crossfire of a climactic gunfight, Sivadhasan's latent battle-readiness resurfaces, and he single-handedly destroys an entire gang with just a handgun, a machete, and a screwdriver. He rescues Yalini from her boss's blood-soaked apartment. Eventually, they all manage to immigrate to England, where they find real peace.

== Cast ==
- Antonythasan Jesuthasan as Dheepan Natarajan/Sivadhasan
- Kalieaswari Srinivasan as Yalini
- Claudine Vinasithamby as Illayaal
- Vincent Rottiers as Brahim
- Marc Zinga as Youssouf
- Faouzi Bensaïdi as Mr. Habib
- Bass Dhem as Azziz
- Franck Falise as Janitor of Hallway C
- Joséphine de Meaux as Headmistress
- Jean-Baptiste Pouilloux as Jurist
- Nathan Anthonypillai as Interpreter
- Vasanth Selvam as Colonel Cheran

== Production ==
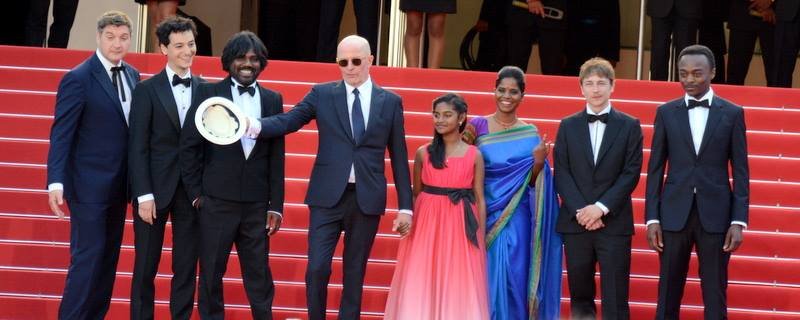
Director and stars at the 2015 Cannes Film Festival.

Director Jacques Audiard started making the film with the intent to make a variation of Sam Peckinpah's 1971 thriller Straw Dogs. But he wanted to set it in a community that no one in France knew much about. He and his writing partner, Thomas Bidegain, decided on the Tamils.

The film's title character, a Tamil Tiger child soldier, is played by Antonythasan Jesuthasan, himself a former child soldier. During filming, Jesuthasan sometimes made corrections for accuracy.

Filming was done at Pirappan Valasai village in Tamil Nadu, India.

== Reception ==
=== Box office ===
Dheepan opened in France on 28 August 2015. The film grossed $3,882,022 in France and $999,774 elsewhere for a worldwide total of $4,881,796.

=== Critical reception ===
The film received largely positive reviews from critics. On Rotten Tomatoes, the film has an 87% rating based on 132 reviews, with an average rating of 7.7/10. The site's consensus reads, "Dheepan offers a timely, powerful look at the modern immigrant experience in Europe.". Metacritic reports a 76 out of 100 rating, based on 29 critics, indicating "generally favorable reviews".

According to critic Andrew Pulver, the film "may not be the director’s most immediately electrifying film, but in its understated way, it’s an immensely powerful work". Commenting on the film, critic Jason Gorber notes that besides depicting immigrant experiences and integration, the film "is polemical without being didactic, and its message about human spirit and how connections of love can flourish in the most astonishing of ways is extremely moving". The Independent called it "a radical and astonishing film that turns conventional thinking about immigrants on its head".

=== Accolades ===
The film won the Palme d'Or at the 2015 Cannes Film Festival. After winning the award, Audiard said "To receive a prize from the Coen brothers is something pretty exceptional. I'm very touched". When the film award was announced, the international press corps responded with a mixture of boos, shrugs and applause. After the announcement ceremony jury co-presidents Joel and Ethan Coen noted that ''everyone [on the jury] had some high level of excitement and enthusiasm for it." Ethan Coen called the jury's decision "swift."

| Award / Film Festival | Category | Recipients and nominees | Result |
|---|---|---|---|
| British Academy Film Awards | Best Film Not in the English Language | Jacques Audiard and Pascal Caucheteux | Nominated |
| Cannes Film Festival | Palme d'Or | Jacques Audiard | Won |
| César Awards | Best Film | | Nominated |
| César Awards | Best Director | Jacques Audiard | Nominated |
| César Awards | Best Actor | Antonythasan Jesuthasan | Nominated |
| César Awards | Best Supporting Actor | Vincent Rottiers | Nominated |
| César Awards | Best Original Screenplay | Jacques Audiard, Thomas Bidegain and Noé Debré | Nominated |
| César Awards | Best Cinematography | Eponine Momenceau | Nominated |
| César Awards | Best Editing | Juliette Welfling | Nominated |
| César Awards | Best Sound | Daniel Sobrino, Valérie Deloof and Cyril Holtz | Nominated |
| César Awards | Best Production Design | Michel Barthélémy | Nominated |
| Lumière Awards | Best Film | | Nominated |
| Lumière Awards | Best Director | Jacques Audiard | Nominated |
| Magritte Awards | Best Supporting Actor | Marc Zinga | Nominated |
| Miami International Film Festival | Grand Jury Prize | | Won |
| Online Film Critics Society Awards | Best Non-U.S. Release | | Won |
