= Raining Cats and Frogs =

- Directed by: Jacques-Rémy Girerd
- Written by: Jacques-Rémy Girerd; Antoine Lanciaux; Iouri Tcherenkov
- Produced by: Patrick Eveno; Jacques-Rémy Girerd
- Starring: Michel Piccoli; Anouk Grinberg; Annie Girardot; Michel Galabru; Jacques Higelin
- Edited by: Hervé Guichard
- Music by: Serge Besset
- Distributed by: BAC Films
- Release date: 3 December 2003 (France)
- Running time: 90 minutes
- Country: France
- Languages: French; English
- Budget: $6.4 million
- Box office: $7.6 million

Raining Cats and Frogs (French: La Prophétie des grenouilles, literally "The Prophecy of Frogs") is a French traditional animation children's feature film, released in 2003, directed by Jacques-Rémy Girerd and written by Girerd, Antoine Lanciaux and Iouri Tcherenkov at the animation studio Folimage. It is the first feature produced by Folimage and is distributed internationally by Universal Pictures.

The film is loosely based on the story of Noah's Ark. It is about a group of frogs who predict an imminent disaster where it will rain for forty days and forty nights. They tell a boy and girl who subsequently help save the animals in a zoo.

The French DVD was released in 2005 with English subtitles.

The US and Canada DVD Raining Cats and Frogs was released in 2008.

== Plot ==
Ferdinand Bauer lives with his wife Juliette on a farm on a hill with their adoptive son (actually his grandson), Tom. The film begins when they agree to care of Lili, his other granddaughter, whom they will look after while Lili's parents travel by car and trailer to Africa to find crocodiles for their zoo, which they also leave in the care of Ferdinand and Juliette.

On the farm, there is a small pond. The frogs in the pond are restless, as their calculations have shown that the Earth is about to be flooded for forty days and forty nights. The frogs initially are reluctant to tell them, since they cannot change anything but decide to tell Tom and Lili, so that they can warn people.

Suddenly the flood starts, apparently washing away all life on Earth. The zoo animals escape to the barn which is on top of a hill, the foundations of the building are torn away by the flood and floats on a huge tractor tire on the water. Ferdinand, an experienced sailor, takes on the role of the captain and every one agrees that they will only survive if they stick together. When the rains finally stop all the animals are very hungry. Ferdinand has stored 28 tons of potatoes which he uses to make French fries, but the carnivores are unhappy because they cannot survive only on French fries but Ferdinand convinces the carnivores to yield in view of the greater good of everyone on the floating barn.

A tortoise appears, injured by a crocodile attack and has lost a leg. Lili befriends the tortoise and Tom notices that she has kept her distance from him ever since. The fox and the lion grudge about their lot of having to feed on potatoes when a voice tells them that they should raise against such decision but the lion prevails in that they should respect the captain's law, however after a few days their huger gets the best of them and they attack a sheep and Ferdinand vanishes the carnivores to a bathing tub that floats behind the barn. In the meantime, Ferdinand and Tom talk about his father, who was the machinist at Ferdinand's boat, who was very handy with them. Ferdinand manages to "motorize" the barn by modifying an old tractor engine to oars at the side of the building.

The tortoise tells Lili her story of how she saved her life and three of her eggs despite losing her limb to the crocodiles, who attacked everyone, including humans, at the time of the flood and convinces Lili that her parents died. Ferdinand and Juliette adopt Lili as their own. At night the carnivores notice that the tortoise is actually in cahoots with the crocodiles to feed the entire barn to them, but she must get rid of the captain. The carnivores are initially unconvinced, but they latter agree to mutiny and in the ensuing fight they throw Ferdinand off the board in a barrel and Juliette jumps off after him. The rest of the animals and the children are locked away at the bottom of the barn. Lili sees now that she fell into the tortoise's trap, who had told her that she would not be her friend if she continued being friends with Tom.

The children and the animals hear a commotion upstairs, which is the result of the carnivores feeding on the poultry, so the children decide to climb on the giraffe's neck, but are overcome by the others. The tortoise convinces most of the carnivores to eat the children next, only the lion and one of the cats are reluctant to do it, but the majority decision is that they are next. The tortoise explains that she is taking revenge on humans because they have pursued and killed her family and her kind for their flesh, eggs and to make luxury items with their carapace, telling the children that the eggs that she keeps in her carapace are not her own but the crocodiles' who believe that the humans had eaten them and thus prompting the attacks on them. Meanwhile, one of the cats convinces the other to help the children, since humans had taken them in when they had no home and if this senseless flesh-eating frenzy continues, there is no guarantee that the kittens inside her womb will be safe.

The tortoise signals the crocodiles to start the attack, the cat frees the children who manage to start the tractor engine and escape from the crocodiles, who are in pursuit of the barn. In the meantime Ferdinand finally manages to wake up and sees that the barn is coming at them at full speed. The tortoise finally manages to break the engine down and the barn seems finally at the mercy of the crocodiles, but the elephants manage to rip the carapace off the tortoise and everyone sees that it is not a female but a male, therefore the eggs cannot be his. As the tortoise is trying to explain his way out the situation, the eggs hatch and out of them come little crocodiles, proving the case against the tortoise. The tortoise is at the mercy of the angry animals who are about to throw him off to the crocodiles, but Ferdinand arrives at the last minute and berates everyone for their violent conduct. He resumes his command as captain, crocodiles leave after acknowledging that they were duped by the tortoise, who remains caparaceless in the barn.

A few days go by and the kittens are born. The general happiness is interrupted when the elephants, who have been unable to move during all their time in the barn, appear at the door to congratulate the proud mother. Ferdinand walks out of the barn and sees that the water has finally gone and that dryland is finally there. There is a lot of mist and as it lifts, all the people and animals at the barn see that there are more boats on the top of other mountains and that there are many survivors. Later that night all celebrate but a huge light interrupts the festivities, it is a large car driven by Lili's parents, who tell the rest that the flood did not take place in Africa.

== Cast ==
Character	French voice actor	English voice actor
Ferdinand Bauer	Michel Piccoli	
Juliette	Laurentine Milebo	
Tom	Kevin Hervé	
Lili	Coline Girerd	
René Lamotte	Luis Rego	
Madame Lamotte	Manuela Gourary	
The tortoise	Anouk Grinberg	
The frogs	Liliane Rovère, Raquel Esteve Mora, Véronique Groux de Miéri, Roseline Guinet, Line Wible, Georgia Lachat & Bénedicte Serre	
The lion	Jacques Higelin	
The fox	Bernard Bouillon	
The wolf	Romain Bouteille	
Bernard, the cat	Patrick Eveno	
The (pregnant) cat	Françoise Monneret	
The Crocodiles and the horse	Gilles Morel	
The Male Elephant	Michel Galabru	
The Female Elephant	Annie Girardot	
The cow	Line Wible	
The tiger	Jean-Pierre Yvars	
The giraffe	Pierre-François Martin-Laval	
The rabbit	Jacques Kessler	
The goat	Georgia Lachat	
The ostrich	Johnny Kroll	

== Critical reception ==
The film was honored at the 4th International Festival of Animated Feature Films where it was awarded the prize for Best Feature Picture.
