= My Man (1996 film) =

1996 film by Bertrand Blier

- Film poster
- Mon homme
- Directed by: Bertrand Blier
- Written by: Bertrand Blier
- Produced by: Alain Sarde
- Starring: Anouk Grinberg; Gérard Lanvin
- Cinematography: Pierre Lhomme
- Edited by: Claudine Merlin
- Music by: Henryk Górecki; Barry White
- Distributed by: BAC Films
- Release date: 31 January 1996
- Running time: 99 minutes
- Country: France
- Language: French
- Budget: $11.8 million
- Box office: $3.5 million

My Man (French: Mon Homme) is a 1996 French drama film written and directed by Bertrand Blier. It was entered into the 46th Berlin International Film Festival where Anouk Grinberg won the Silver Bear for Best Actress.

== Plot ==
Marie is a prostitute who enjoys her job: she likes the independence, she likes the money, and she likes pleasing men. One cold night she sees a homeless man asleep at the foot of the stairs and, struck by his plight, asks him up to her apartment. His name is Jeannot and, after she has given him food and drink, she offers herself. Realising that she has fallen in love with him, and wanting to keep him, she offers him the job of being her pimp.

Jeannot likes the independence, the money, and the sex with Marie, but is lonely mooching around town while she is entertaining clients in the apartment. Meeting a manicurist called Sanguine, he decides to make her his next prostitute. Her first client happens to be a police inspector investigating vice rings and Jeannot ends up in jail.

Marie, devastated at losing Jeannot and at his treachery, is also sorry over Sanguine's plight. She decides to give up prostitution and to raise a family with a good man. Meeting Jean-François in a bar, she decides that he will be the father and invites Sanguine to join the two of them. When Jeannot is released he meets Bérengère, who is looking for a man. Since neither Marie nor Sanguine ever visited or wrote to him, he moves into her house.

Jean-François, who has given Marie two babies and has another on the way with Sanguine, keeps getting fired and is now unemployable, being on the black list. With the electricity cut off and Sanguine due to deliver at any moment, Marie decides to go back to prostitution. But the men do not seem interested in her any more and the prices they offer are derisory. Coming home despondent, she finds a mute Jeannot at the table. While Jean-François prepares to rush Sanguine to the maternity hospital, Jeannot mutters his apologies to them all.

== Cast ==
- Anouk Grinberg - Marie Abarth
- Gérard Lanvin - Jean "Jeannot" Bourdelle
- Valeria Bruni Tedeschi - Sarah "Sanguine" Vézaian
- Olivier Martinez - Jean-François Loriot
- Dominique Valadié - Gilberte
- Jacques François - 2nd Client
- Michel Galabru - 3rd Client: Armoire
- Robert Hirsch - M. Hervé
- Bernard Le Coq - Inspector Marvier
- Bernard Fresson - Personnel Director
- Jacques Gamblin - 4th Client
- Jean-Pierre Darroussin - Gilbert's Client
- Ginette Garcin - Woman in Shawl
- Dominique Lollia - Mélissa
- Frédéric Pierrot - The Cop
- Aurore Clément - Woman of the World
- Jean-Pierre Léaud - M. Claude
- Jean-Philippe Écoffey

== Production ==
In 2021, Anouk Grinberg said that making this movie was so traumatic for her that she wanted to stay away from cinema for years.

== Accolades ==
Award / Film Festival	Category	Recipients and nominees	Result
Berlin Film Festival	Golden Bear	Bertrand Blier	Nominated
Berlin Film Festival	Silver Bear for Best Actress	Anouk Grinberg	Won
César Awards	Best Actress	Anouk Grinberg	Nominated
César Awards	Best Supporting Actress	Valeria Bruni Tedeschi	Nominated
