= Michel Vinaver =

French writer (1927–2022)

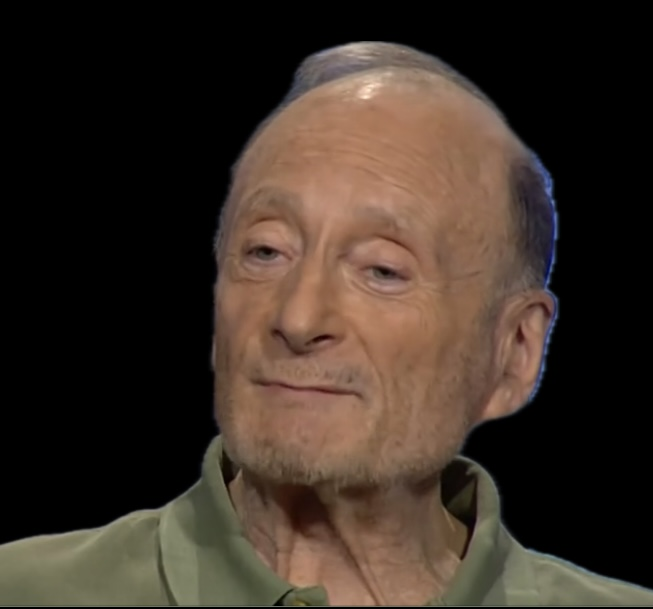
- Michel Vinaver in 2006
- Born: Michel Grinberg; 13 January 1927; Paris, France
- Died: 1 May 2022 (aged 95); Paris, France
- Education: Wesleyan University
- Occupations: Writer; Dramatist
- Spouse: Catherine Le Tellier
- Children: Anouk Grinberg

Michel Vinaver (born Michel Grinberg; 13 January 1927 – 1 May 2022) was a French writer and dramatist. He was born in Paris to parents who had emigrated from Russia. He was the manager of Gillette. He is the father of actress Anouk Grinberg. In 2006 he was awarded the Grand prix du théâtre de l'Académie française.

== Works ==
- l'Objecteur (c. 1952; awarded the 1952 Fénéon Prize)
- Les Coréens (1956)
- Iphigénie Hotel (1963)
- A la renverse (1980)
- Jules César - translation from Shakespeare (1990) ISBN 2-86943-277-1
- 11 septembre 2001/11 September 2001 (2001)
