= Anouk Grinberg =

French actress

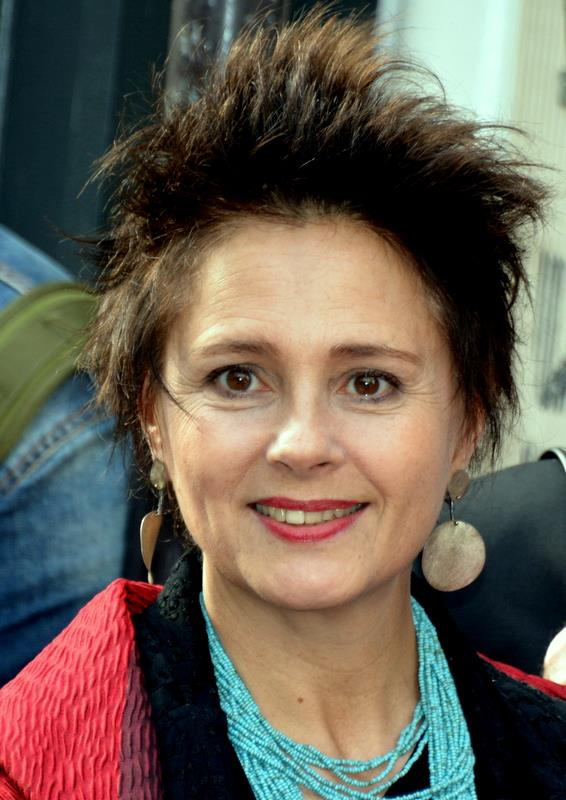
- Grinberg in 2014
- Born: 20 March 1963 (age 63); Uccle, Belgium
- Occupation: Actress
- Years active: 1976–present

Anouk Grinberg (French: [anuk ɡʁɛ̃bɛʁ]; born 20 March 1963) is a French actress. She is the daughter of Michel Vinaver (born Michel Grinberg), a French writer and dramatist, and the great-granddaughter of the pre-1917 Russian politician Maxim Vinaver.

She has appeared in more than 40 films and television shows since 1976. In 1996, she won the Silver Bear for Best Actress at the 46th Berlin International Film Festival for her role in the film Mon Homme.

== Personal life ==
For a time she lived with movie director Bertrand Blier and they had a son together. She is now married to mathematician Michel Broué. Her niece, Louise Grinberg, is also an actress.

== Theater ==
Year	Title	Author	Director	Notes
1978	Remagen	Jacques Lassalle	Jacques Lassalle	
1982	Doctor Faustus Lights the Lights	Gertrude Stein	Richard Foreman	
1983	L'Ordinaire	Michel Vinaver	Michel Vinaver & Alain Françon	
1984	The Broken Jug	Heinrich von Kleist	Bernard Sobel	
1984	Noises	Enzo Cormann	Alain Françon (2)	
1985	The School for Wives	Molière	Bernard Sobel (2)	
1986	Les Voisins	Michel Vinaver	Alain Françon (3)	
1989	My Mother Said I Never Should	Charlotte Keatley	Michel Fagadau	Nominated - Molière Award for Most Promising Actress
1990	The Mother and the Whore	Jean Eustache	Jean-Louis Martinelli	Nominated - Molière Award for Most Promising Actress
1991–92	Time and the Room	Botho Strauß	Patrice Chéreau	Nominated - Molière Award for Best Actress
1998–99	Chaos debout	Véronique Olmi	Jacques Lassalle (2)	
2000	Marcel en campagne	Marc Hollogne	Marc Hollogne	
2001	Feydeau terminus	Georges Feydeau	Didier Bezace	
2002–03	Proof	David Auburn	Bernard Murat	Nominated - Molière Award for Best Actress
2005	Big and Little	Botho Strauß	Philippe Calvario	
2006	Rosa, la vie	Rosa Luxemburg	Anouk Grinberg	
2009	Rosa, la vie	Rosa Luxemburg	Anouk Grinberg	
2010	Les Fausses Confidences	Pierre de Marivaux	Didier Bezace (2)	Nominated - Molière Award for Best Actress
2012	Haïm - à la lumière d'un violon	Gérald Garutti	Gérald Garutti	
2012–13	Molly Bloom	James Joyce	Marc Paquien	Nominated - Molière Award for Best Actress
2015	La Révolte	Auguste Villiers de l'Isle-Adam	Marc Paquien (2)	

== Filmography ==
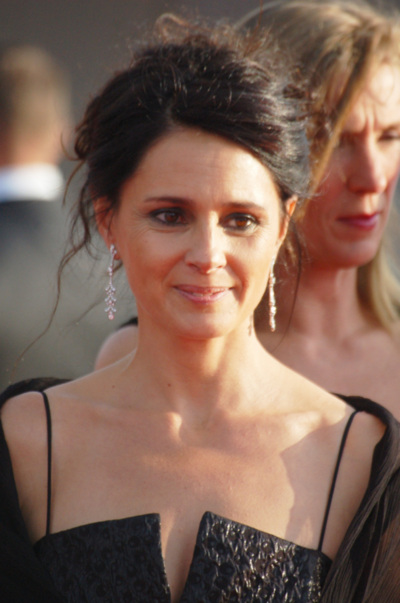
Grinberg in 2007

Year	Title	Role	Director	Notes
1976	Mon coeur est rouge	The little girl	Michèle Rosier	
1979	Tapage nocturne		Catherine Breillat	
1987	The Ghost Valley		Alain Tanner	
1987	Last Song	Blue	Dennis Berry	
1987	Les fortifs	Paulette	Marco Pico	TV movie
1987	L'heure Simenon	Lucille Roy	Claude Goretta	TV series (1 Episode)
1989	L'enfant de l'hiver	Stephane's sister	Olivier Assayas	
1989	Embrasse-moi	The seer	Michèle Rosier (2)	
1990	La fille du magicien	Lili	Claudine Bories	Acteurs à l'Écran - Best Actress
1990	Les matins chagrins	Lena	Jean-Pierre Gallepe	
1991	Merci la vie	Joëlle	Bertrand Blier	Prix Romy Schneider; Prix Suzanne Bianchetti; Nominated - César Award for Best Actress
1991	J'entends plus la guitare	Adrienne	Philippe Garrel	
1991	Août	Caroline	Henri Herré	
1991	Le cri du lézard	Nadia	Bertrand Theubet	
1991	Comme nous serons heureux		Magali Clément	Short
1993	1, 2, 3, Sun	Victorine	Bertrand Blier (2)	Nominated - César Award for Best Actress
1995	Sale gosse	Nina	Claude Mouriéras	Thessaloniki International Film Festival - Best Actress
1995	La grande collection	Claire	Jeanne Labrune	TV series (1 Episode)
1996	My Man	Marie Abarth	Bertrand Blier (3)	Berlin Film Festival Award for Best Actress; Nominated - César Award for Best Actress
1996	A Self Made Hero	Servane	Jacques Audiard	
1998	Disparus	Mila	Gilles Bourdos	
2000	Denti	Antonio's mother	Gabriele Salvatores	
2002	Entre chiens et loups	Marie	Alexandre Arcady	
2002	Les petites couleurs	Christelle	Patricia Plattner	
2003	Raining Cats and Frogs	The turtle	Jacques-Rémy Girerd	
2003	Une preuve d'amour	Cathie	Bernard Stora	TV movie
2003	Marylin et ses enfants	Marylin	Charli Beléteau	TV movie
2003	Les enquêtes d'Éloïse Rome	Aïna Larken	Christophe Douchand	TV series (1 Episode)
2004	Une vie à t'attendre	Camille	Thierry Klifa	
2004	Nuit noire	Sandra	Daniel Colas	
2005	Ma meilleure amie	Michèle	Élisabeth Rappeneau	TV movie
2006	Les fragments d'Antonin	Madeleine Oberstein	Gabriel Le Bomin	
2006	Le fil rouge	The video woman	Sarah Moon	Short
2006	Le procès de Bobigny	Gisèle Halimi	François Luciani	TV movie
2007–09	Kaamelott	Anna de Tintagel	Alexandre Astier	TV series (4 Episodes)
2008	Voici venir l'orage...	Tatiana	Nina Companeez	TV Mini-Series
2010	Camus	Francine Camus	Laurent Jaoui	TV movie
2011	Joseph l'insoumis	Alicia	Caroline Glorion	TV movie
2012	Sea, No Sex & Sun	Claude	Christophe Turpin	
2016	Baby Love	Mother Gabriel	Nathalie Najem	
2017	Money	Anaïs	Géla Babluani	
2017	Le sang de la vigne	Roxane Gimonprez	Marc Rivière	TV series (1 Episode)
2020	L'Autre	Marie	Charlotte Dauphin	
2022	L'Innocent	Sylvie	Louis Garrel	
2022	La nuit du 12	La juge	Dominik Moll	
2025	Melpomene	Hanah	Charlotte Dauphin	
