= The Beat That My Heart Skipped =

- French: De battre mon cœur s'est arrêté
- Directed by: Jacques Audiard
- Written by: Jacques Audiard; Tonino Benacquista
- Based on: Fingers by James Toback
- Produced by: Pascal Caucheteux
- Starring: Romain Duris; Niels Arestrup; Jonathan Zaccaï; Gilles Cohen; Linh Dan Pham; Aure Atika; Emmanuelle Devos; Melanie Laurent
- Cinematography: Stéphane Fontaine
- Edited by: Juliette Welfling
- Music by: Alexandre Desplat
- Production companies: Why Not Productions; SEDIF; France 3 Cinéma
- Distributed by: UGC Fox Distribution
- Release dates: 17 February 2005 (Berlin); 16 March 2005 (France)
- Running time: 107 minutes
- Country: France
- Language: French
- Budget: $6.2 million
- Box office: $10,988,397

The Beat That My Heart Skipped (French: De battre mon cœur s'est arrêté; "To Beat My Heart Has Stopped") is a 2005 French neo-noir drama film directed by Jacques Audiard and starring Romain Duris. It is a remake of the 1978 American film Fingers. It explores the life of Tom, a shady realtor torn between a criminal life and his desire to become a concert pianist. The film premiered on 17 February 2005 at the Berlin Film Festival. The film was given limited release to theaters in North America and grossed $1,023,424 and $10,988,397 worldwide.

== Plot ==
Intense young "tough" Thomas Seyr is a 28-year-old real estate broker involved in shady business deals. His business partners, Fabrice and Sami, spend much of their time ruthlessly chasing squatters and illegal immigrants out of the buildings they have procured and trying to work their way around government housing regulations. Thomas is born to this kind of work; his father, Robert, is involved in dodgy endeavors and sometimes calls upon Thomas to beat up people who refuse to pay. Tom shows a protective and defensive attitude toward his father, who does not always appreciate what his son does for him.

When his father Robert introduces his new girlfriend to Tom, the son undermines her. He insults her to his father and says that she is an opportunistic "whore.

Later, when he tries to enlist her help to watch over his father, she tells him they broke up due to Robert's changing his attitude toward her, and that he told her about Tom's backstabbing. By this time Robert is in danger from a Russian gangster, Minskov, who scammed him out of 300,000 euros, and Tom is worried for his safety.

Tom had earlier chanced upon his late mother's manager; she was a concert pianist until her death eight years ago. The manager remembers Tom's playing for him and invites him to audition. Tom becomes obsessed with the idea of being a concert pianist.

He finds a teacher newly emigrated to France, virtuoso Miao Lin, to help him prepare for the audition. She speaks only Chinese, Vietnamese, and some English. Tom misses business appointments and drops assignments while practicing piano around the clock. He also works in an affair with the wife of one of his business partners.

Tom reaches the high standards of his teacher, but falls apart at the audition, after having stayed up all night helping his partners with a business deal. He goes to see his father, only to find the apartment destroyed and his father murdered. Tom is devastated.

Two years later, Tom tests a piano onstage and gives directions to the stage manager. He drives Miao Lin to the concert hall and parks the car.

He happens to see Minskov, who he believes killed his father. He takes Minskov by surprise waiting for an elevator. They fight in the stairwell, but at the end, Tom cannot shoot him.

Tom washes in the restroom and takes his seat in the concert hall, knuckles and shirt bloody. He exchanges affectionate glances with Miao Lin at the piano, apparently her manager and partner.

== Cast ==
- Romain Duris as Thomas Seyr
- Niels Arestrup as Robert Seyr
- Jonathan Zaccaï as Fabrice
- Gilles Cohen as Sami
- Linh Dan Pham as Miao Lin
- Jian-Zhang as Jean-Pierre (Miao Lin's friend)
- Aure Atika as Aline
- Anton Yakovlev as Minskov
- Mélanie Laurent as Minskov's Girlfriend
- Emmanuelle Devos as Chris
- Sandy Whitelaw as Fox

== Background ==
The film is a remake of James Toback's 1978 film Fingers. It devotes more attention than the original to the relationship that develops between Tom and his piano teacher, Miao Lin. The idea that affection can blossom despite a language barrier is one which Jacques Audiard has raised before in Read My Lips (starring Vincent Cassel).

For the film, Duris learned to play his own piano sequences–most notably, Bach's Toccata in E minort. He was trained by his sister, pianist Caroline Duris, who performs on the soundtrack.

The film's French title comes from the lyrics of the Jacques Dutronc song "La Fille du père Noël" ("Santa Claus's Daughter"), written by Jacques Lanzmann. It translates to English as "My heart stopped beating."

== Critical response ==
On the review aggregator website Rotten Tomatoes, 86% of 100 critics' reviews are positive. The website's consensus reads: "Stylish and visceral, this able remake is infused with realism, grit, and a taut performance by star Romain Duris." Metacritic, which uses a weighted average, assigned the film a score of 75 out of 100, based on 32 critics, indicating "generally favorable" reviews.

== Awards and nominations ==
=== Won ===
- BAFTA Awards
  - Best Film not in the English Language
- Berlin Film Festival
  - Silver Berlin Bear: Best Film Music (Alexandre Desplat)
- César Awards
  - Best Actor – Supporting Role (Niels Arestrup)
  - Best Cinematography (Stéphane Fontaine)
  - Best Director (Jacques Audiard)
  - Best Editing (Juliette Welfling)
  - Best Film
  - Best Music Written for a Film (Alexandre Desplat)
  - Best Adaptation (Jacques Audiard and Tonino Benacquista)
  - Most Promising Actress (Linh Dan Pham)
- French Syndicate of Cinema Critics
  - Best Film
- Lumière Awards
  - Best Film
  - Best Actor (Romain Duris)
- Seville European Film Festival
  - Golden Giraldillo to Best Film

=== Nominated ===
- Berlin Film Festival
  - Golden Berlin Bear (Jacques Audiard)
- César Awards
  - Best Actor – Leading Role (Romain Duris)
  - Best Sound (Philippe Amouroux, Cyril Holtz, Brigitte Taillandier and Pascal Villard)
- European Film Awards
  - Best Actor (Romain Duris)
  - (Audience Award) Best Director (Jacques Audiard)
