= A Prophet =

2009 film by Jacques Audiard

- Theatrical release poster
- Directed by: Jacques Audiard
- Screenplay by: Jacques Audiard; Thomas Bidegain; Abdel Raouf Dafri; Nicolas Peufaillit
- Story by: Abdel Raouf Dafri
- Produced by: Lauranne Bourrachot; Martine Cassinelli; Pascal Caucheteux; Marco Cherqui
- Starring: Tahar Rahim; Niels Arestrup; Adel Bencherif
- Cinematography: Stéphane Fontaine
- Edited by: Juliette Welfling
- Music by: Alexandre Desplat
- Production companies: Why Not Productions; Chic Films; Page 114; France 2 Cinéma; UGC Images; BIM Distribuzione; Celluloid Dreams
- Distributed by: UGC Distribution (France); BiM Distribuzione (Italy)
- Release dates: 16 May 2009 (Cannes); 26 August 2009 (France)
- Running time: 155 minutes
- Countries: France; Italy
- Languages: French; Arabic; Corsican (Note: These are the languages used in the film, not necessarily languages in which it is dubbed)
- Budget: $13 million
- Box office: $17.9 million

A Prophet (French: Un prophète) is a 2009 French prison crime film directed by Jacques Audiard with a screenplay by Audiard, Thomas Bidegain, Abdel Raouf Dafri and Nicolas Peufaillit, from a story by Dafri. The film stars Tahar Rahim in the title role as an imprisoned petty criminal of Algerian origin who rises in the prison hierarchy. He becomes a mob associate and drug trafficker as he is absorbed into the Corsican mafia and then ingratiates himself into the Maghrebi crime syndicate. The film was nominated for the Best Foreign Language Film at the 82nd Academy Awards.

== Plot ==
Malik El Djebena, a 19-year-old of Maghrebi descent, is sentenced to six years in prison for attacking police officers. Alone and illiterate upon his arrival, he falls under the sway of Corsican mobsters, led by César Luciani, who enforces a brutal rule.

The prison is divided between two main factions: the Corsicans and the Maghrebis. Malik keeps to himself. When Luciani forces him to be the unwilling assassin of Reyeb, a Maghrebi witness in a trial, Malik gains the protection of the Corsicans despite his North African origin.

Malik serves as a low-level servant to the Corsicans, who treat him with disdain. All the while, he is haunted by visions of the murdered Reyeb.

When most of the Corsicans are transferred or released, Luciani is forced to give Malik more responsibility. Having secretly learned Corsican, Malik acts as Luciani's eyes and ears in the prison. When Malik earns the privilege of day-long furloughs outside the prison, Luciani relies on him to conduct Luciani's criminal business outside.

Ryad, a Maghrebi friend, teaches Malik to read and write, and the two become close. Ryad teaches Malik about his own heritage, introducing him to two other Maghrebis, Tarik and Hassan, and increases his power within the prison.

Malik also becomes involved with a prison drug dealer, Jordi. When Ryad gains an early release due to testicular cancer, the three partners organize a drug-running enterprise to sell hashish. But when Ryad is kidnapped by the drug dealer Latif, Malik tracks down Latif's relative inside the prison. He kidnaps the relative's family and forces Latif's gang to release Ryad.

When Luciani discovers that Malik is using his day-releases for his own personal enterprise, he punishes him by pressing a spoon against his eye. Later on, Malik is sent by César to meet Brahim Lattrache in Marseille, another Maghrebi, who is involved in a deal between Luciani and the Lingherris, an Italian mafia group. Lattrache is bitter toward the Corsicans for the murder of Reyeb and holds Malik at gunpoint. When Malik spots a deer warning sign, he remembers a recent dream of deer running in the road. He tells his kidnappers that they are in danger of hitting wild animals, and they suddenly strike a deer. Lattrache is impressed by Malik, calling him a prophet and agreeing to conduct criminal business with him instead of Luciani, even though Malik admitted that he killed Reyeb.

Luciani believes there is a "mole" in his organization and decides to use Malik to assassinate Jacky Marcaggi, the don of the Corsican mafia, for secretly dealing with the Lingherris. But Malik and Ryad have their own plan for Marcaggi: they kill his bodyguards, kidnap him, and tell him that it was Luciani who ordered the hit before abandoning him in the city.

Malik takes refuge at Ryad's house. The friend's cancer has returned: Ryad's decision to forego more chemotherapy leaves him just six months to live. He gets Malik to promise to take care of his family (wife and young son) when he's gone.

Upon Malik's return to prison, he is placed in solitary for returning late on purpose - putting him temporarily out of reach of Luciani's retribution - while Marcaggi uses his influence to wipe out Luciani's faction. Once back in general population, Malik joins the Maghrebi faction in the yard as their new leader. When a now powerless Luciani tries to approach him, two Maghrebis intercept and beat him.

On the day of his release, Malik is met by Ryad's wife and son outside the prison. They walk off together, followed by a convoy of vehicles carrying Malik's new associates.

== Cast ==
- Tahar Rahim as Malik El-Djebena
- Niels Arestrup as César Luciani
- Adel Bencherif as Ryad
- Reda Kateb as Jordi Le Gitan
- Hichem Yacoubi as Reyeb
- Jean-Philippe Ricci as Vettori
- Gilles Cohen as Prof
- Antoine Basler as Pilicci
- Leïla Bekhti as Djamila, Ryad's wife
- Pierre Leccia as Sampierro
- Foued Nassah as Antaro
- Jean-Emmanuel Pagni as Santi
- Frédéric Graziani as Chef de détention
- Slimane Dazi as Lattrache
- Alaa Oumouzoune as Rebelled prisoner
- Salem Kali as Le prisonnier mutin
- Pascal Henault as Ceccaldi (un corse)
- Sonia Hell as Une matonne

== Production ==
Audiard stated that in making the film he intended to "creat[e] icons, images for people who don't have images in movies, like the Arabs in France," though he also had stated that the film "has nothing to do with his vision of society," and is a work of fiction.

Audiard had been thinking about making a film set in prison after he had attended a screening of one of his films in one such institution and found himself shocked by the conditions there. The film's screenplay was submitted to them by a producer and reworked by Audiard and Thomas Bidegain.

Audiard cast Niels Arestrup as the Corsican crime boss César Luciani, after featuring him in his previous film, The Beat that My Heart Skipped. He met Tahar Rahim, who plays Malik, when they shared an automobile ride from another film set. To ensure the authenticity of the prison experience, Audiard hired former convicts as advisors and extras.

== Reception ==
=== Critical response ===
A Prophet received widespread critical acclaim. Review aggregator Rotten Tomatoes reports that 96% of critics have given the film a positive review based on 163 reviews, with an average score of 8.6/10. Its critical consensus states that "Featuring an impressive star turn by newcomer Tahar Rahim, A Prophet is a French gangster film filled with arresting, immediate details." At Metacritic, which assigns a weighted mean rating out of 100 to reviews from mainstream critics, the film received an average score of 90, based on 31 reviews.

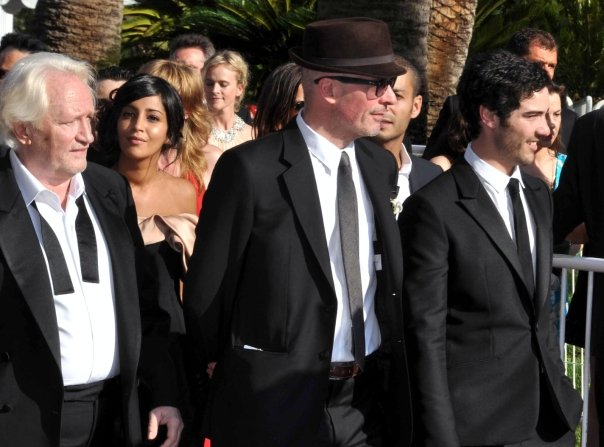
Director Jacques Audiard (center) and stars Niels Arestrup and Tahar Rahim at the 2009 Cannes Film Festival.

Reception of the film after its debut screening at 2009 Cannes Film Festival at the competition was good. A Prophet was picked as the best film of the festival by a group of sixteen English-language critics and bloggers polled by the daily independent film news site indieWIRE.

Karin Badt at The Huffington Post called it "refreshingly free". Jonathan Romney of Screen International said that the film "works both as hard-edged, painstaking detailed social realism and as a compelling genre entertainment".

Luke Davies of The Monthly criticized some of the film's stylistic methodology and content, asserting that the prophetic themes could have been stretched out, but he celebrated the film's central character and his well-executed "improbable rise from invisibility to dominance", describing "what gives [the film] such dynamic energy is the seamlessness with which this transition unfolds". Davies described the film's main achievement as conveying a character as "someone we care about and gun for", who started life on screen as a blank slate.

== Awards ==
A Prophet won the BAFTA for Best Film Not in the English Language and nine Césars (including Best Film, Director, Actor and Supporting Actor), in addition to prizes at both the 2009 Cannes Film Festival and the London Film Festival. It was nominated for the Best Foreign Language Film at the 82nd Academy Awards.

It was France's submission for the 82nd Academy Awards for Best Foreign Film. On 2 February 2010, when Academy Award nominations were announced, A Prophet received a nomination for Best Foreign Language film. The other four films in the category were Ajami, The Milk of Sorrow and The White Ribbon, and the eventual winner, El secreto de sus ojos.

A Prophet won the Grand Prix at the 2009 Cannes Film Festival. At the 53rd London Film Festival, it won the Best Film Award. It won the Prix Louis Delluc 2009. At the 63rd British Academy Film Awards, it won a BAFTA for Best Film Not in the English Language. It was nominated for 13 César Awards, tying it with three other films for the most nominations of any film in César history. It won 9 Césars at the ceremony, including Best Film, Best Director, Best Actor and Best Supporting Actor. The film was nominated for the Grand Prix of the Belgian Syndicate of Cinema Critics. The film also won London's Favourite French Film award in 2010, as well as Best Foreign Film at the 13th annual British Independent Film Awards, which were held in London at the Old Billingsgate on 5 December 2010.

A Prophet was also nominated for Best International Film at the 8th Irish Film and Television Awards, an award that went to The Social Network.

In a 2016 BBC poll of 177 critics worldwide, A Prophet was voted the 85th best film since 2000.

In 2010, Empire magazine ranked it at number 63 in its "The 100 Best Films Of World Cinema" list.

In 2025, the film ranked number 35 on The New York Times' list of "The 100 Best Movies of the 21st Century" and number 57 on Rolling Stone's list of "The 100 Best Movies of the 21st Century."

Actors Sam Claflin, Karl Urban and Jon Bernthal and filmmakers Judd Apatow and Ryan Coogler named it as one of their favourite films.

=== Box office ===
The film grossed $10,309,555 in France, and $2,087,720 in the United States and Canada.

In the United Kingdom, the film grossed £1.3 million ($2,025,000), making it the fourth highest-grossing foreign-language film of 2010 in the UK (below My Name Is Khan, The Girl with the Dragon Tattoo, and The Girl Who Played with Fire).

=== Home media ===
In the United Kingdom, it was 2012's eighth most-watched foreign-language film on television with 190,000 viewers on Channel 4, and the year's most-watched French-language film.

== Cancelled remake ==
On 22 January 2016, Deadline reported that Sam Raimi was in talks to direct Sony's remake of the film, with Neal H. Moritz and Tobe Jaffe producing, and Dennis Lehane writing the script. On February 14, 2020, it was reported that Paramount Players acquired the project, which became Rapman’s American Son with Stephan James and Russell Crowe. In 2024, Rapman revealed that the project had been cancelled before the start of filming due to the COVID-19 pandemic.

== See also ==
- List of submissions to the 82nd Academy Awards for Best Foreign Language Film
- List of French submissions for the Academy Award for Best Foreign Language Film
