= Read My Lips (film) =

2001 film by Jacques Audiard

- theatrical poster
- Directed by: Jacques Audiard
- Written by: Tonino Benacquista; Jacques Audiard
- Produced by: Jean-Louis Livi; Philippe Carcassonne; Bernard Marescot (executive: SEDIF); Alix Raynaud (executive: Ciné B)
- Starring: Vincent Cassel; Emmanuelle Devos; Olivier Gourmet; Olivia Bonamy; Olivier Perrier; Bernard Alane
- Cinematography: Mathieu Vadepied
- Edited by: Juliette Welfling
- Music by: Alexandre Desplat
- Production companies: SEDIF; Ciné B Pathé; France 2 Cinéma; Canal+ (participation); Centre National de la Cinématographie (aid)
- Distributed by: Pathé Distribution
- Release date: 17 October 2001
- Running time: 119 minutes
- Country: France
- Language: French
- Budget: $8.8 million
- Box office: $5.4 million

Read My Lips (French: Sur mes lèvres) is a 2001 French film by Jacques Audiard, co-written with Tonino Benacquista. The film stars Vincent Cassel as Paul, an ex-con on parole, and Emmanuelle Devos as Carla, a nearly deaf secretary whose colleagues treat her disrespectfully, causing her to suffer. Despite their different backgrounds and initial fear of each other, they end up intimately related and helping each other.

== Plot ==
The film is set partially in the business offices and partially in the underworld of Paris. Carla, a lonely woman burdened by lack of respect from her co-workers and her only friend, Annie, begins to change after a younger man enters her life.

Carla is introduced immediately with a shot of her putting in her hearing aids. She is an overworked and under-appreciated secretary for a construction company, ridiculed behind her back by her co-workers who do not know she is deaf but despise her homely appearance and subservient position. After she faints from exhaustion she accepts the boss's offer to hire an intern to lighten her load.

The first applicant to be her assistant, Paul, is an ex-convict who is not technically qualified to be Carla's assistant, but she hires him. Paul's affable nature and "bad boy" spirit relieve Carla's loneliness and open up new possibilities for her. She rebuffs his initial clumsy sexual advances, but gradually they become a team, using creative but questionable methods to improve Carla's position at work.

Paul convinces her to help him – by using her lip-reading skills – to rob Marchand, a nightclub owner to whom he owes a lot of money and for whom he is working at night to pay off the debt. Reluctant at first, Carla becomes more intrigued as problems arise. After Paul fails to find the money, Carla finds it in Marchand's freezer and takes it to the car where she waits for Paul.

Marchand discovers the theft, thinks Paul stole the money, catches and beats him. Carla and Paul engineer his escape and the robbery's total success. As the movie ends, she instigates their making out for the first time in the car.

== Cast ==
- Vincent Cassel : Paul Angeli
- Emmanuelle Devos : Carla Behm
- Olivier Gourmet : Marchand
- Olivia Bonamy : Annie
- Olivier Perrier : Masson
- Bernard Alane : Morel
- Céline Samie : Josie
- Pierre Diot : Keller
- François Loriquet : Jean-François
- Serge Boutleroff : Mammouth
- David Saracino : Richard Carambo
- Christophe Vandevelde : Louis Carambo
- Bô Gaultier de Kermoal : Le Barman
- Loïc Le Page : Quentin
- Nathalie Lacroix : L'Empoloyée ANPE
- Laurent Valo : Le jeune sourd du café
- Christiane Cohendy : Mathilde
- Isabelle Caubère : Jeanne
- Chloé Mons : Boubou
- Patrick Steltzer : Lehaleur
- Patrick Wintousky : Le chef de chantier
- Gladys Gambie : Danseuse n° 1
- Maurine Nicot : Danseuse n° 2
- Keena : Danseuse n° 3

== Awards and nominations ==
- César Awards (France)
  - Won: Best Actress – Leading Role (Emmanuelle Devos)
  - Won: Best Sound (Cyril Holtz and Pascal Villard)
  - Won: Best Original Screenplay or Adaptation (Jacques Audiard and Tonino Benacquista)
  - Nominated: Best Actor – Leading Role (Vincent Cassel)
  - Nominated: Best Cinematography (Mathieu Vadepied)
  - Nominated: Best Director (Jacques Audiard)
  - Nominated: Best Editing (Juliette Welfling)
  - Nominated: Best Film
  - Nominated: Best Music (Alexandre Desplat)
- European Film Awards
  - Nominated: Best Actress (Emmanuelle Devos)
  - Nominated: Best Screenwriter (Jacques Audiard and Tonino Benacquista)
  - Nominated: Audience Award – Best Actor (Vincent Cassel)
  - Nominated: Audience Award – Best Actress (Emmanuelle Devos)
- Newport Film Festival (USA)
  - Won: Best Actress (Emmanuelle Devos)
  - Won: Best Director (Jacques Audiard)

== See also ==
- List of films featuring the deaf and hard of hearing
