= Jacques Audiard =

French filmmaker (born 1952)

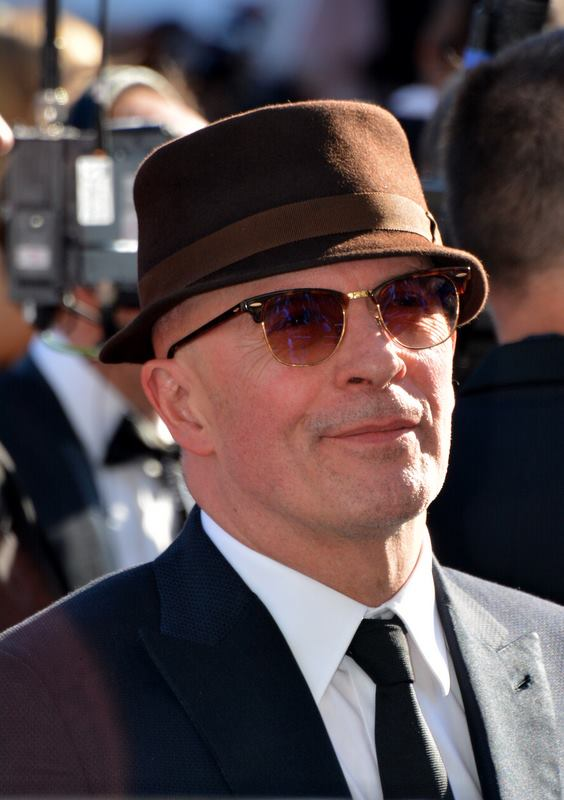
- Audiard at the 2017 Cannes Film Festival
- Born: 30 April 1952 (age 74); Paris, France
- Occupations: Film director; screenwriter; producer
- Years active: 1974–present
- Father: Michel Audiard

Jacques Audiard (French: [ʒak odjaʁ]; born 30 April 1952) is a French filmmaker. One of the most awarded auteurs in history of French cinema, his international accolades include an Academy Award, three BAFTAs, and three Golden Globes. He holds the record for most individual wins in the history of the César Awards, France's national film awards, with thirteen wins between 1995 and 2025 including three separate Best Film/Best Director/Best Screenplay trifectas, and won four prizes from the Cannes Film Festival.

After working extensively as a screenwriter since the 1970s, Audiard made his directorial debut with See How They Fall (1994), followed by A Self-Made Hero (1996) and Read My Lips (2001). His drama The Beat That My Heart Skipped (2005) was seen as his breakout film, earning him a BAFTA Award and his first César trifecta, followed by a second for the prison crime drama A Prophet (2009), which earned a nomination for the Academy Award for Best Foreign Language Film. After Dheepan (2015), mostly in Tamil language and which won him Cannes' Palme d'Or, he made his English-language debut with the western The Sisters Brothers (2018) and his Spanish-language debut with the musical Emilia Pérez (2024), which won Golden Globes for Best Musical or Comedy and Best Non-English Language Film, and also earned Audiard an Academy Award for Best Original Song (for "El Mal") along with three nominations for Best Picture, Best Director, and Best Adapted Screenplay.

== Early life ==
Audiard was born in Paris, the son of Marie-Christine Guibert and Michel Audiard, who was a film director and screenwriter. He began his screenwriting career in the 1980s with films including Réveillon chez Bob!, Mortelle randonnée, Baxter, Fréquence Meurtre, and Saxo.

== Career ==
In 1994, he directed See How They Fall (French: Regarde les hommes tomber), a road movie starring Mathieu Kassovitz and Jean-Louis Trintignant. The film won the César Award for best first film and the Prix Georges-Sadoul. Two years later he reunited with Kassovitz and Trintignant for Un Héros Très Discret – A Self-Made Hero in English, adapted from the novel by Jean-François Deniau. In 1996, A Self-Made Hero won the Best Screenplay Award at Cannes and received six César Awards nominations. In 2002, Read My Lips was nominated for nine Césars and won three, for Best Actress (Emmanuelle Devos), Best Screenplay and Best Sound. His fourth movie, De Battre Mon Cœur s'est Arrêté, received 10 nominations at the Césars and won eight, among them the Césars for Best Film, Best Director, Best Screenplay, Best Film Music and Best Cinematography. He has won both the César Award for Best Film and the BAFTA Award for Best Film Not in the English Language twice, in 2005 for The Beat That My Heart Skipped and in 2010 for A Prophet, as well as winning the Grand Prix at the Cannes Film Festival.

In 2009, A Prophet won the Grand Prix at Cannes and the BAFTA award for Best Film Not in the English Language, and was nominated for 13 César Awards, winning nine: Best Film, Best Director, Best Actor and Most Promising Actor for Tahar Rahim, Best Supporting Actor for Niels Arestrup, Best Original Screenplay, Best Cinematography, Best Editing and Best Production Design. His 2012 film Rust and Bone competed for the Palme d'Or at the 2012 Cannes Film Festival, was nominated for the BAFTA Award for Best Film Not in the English Language and the Golden Globe Award for Best Foreign Language Film, and won the BFI London Film Festival Award for Best Film. In 2015, his seventh movie, Dheepan won the Palme d'Or at the 2015 Cannes Film Festival.

Audiard is one of the first filmmakers to participate in LaCinetek's project, a streaming platform where the films are curated exclusively from lists of favorites by acclaimed directors. Published on the platform's launch day, his list of 61 films notably includes Charlie Chaplin's series of comedies from both Essanay Studios and Keystone Studios. He has released some music videos, among them Comme Elle Vient by Noir Désir in which all the actors were deaf-mute and interpreted the lyrics of the song in sign language. The beginning of the feature (a sequence with subtitles) created a minor scandal; it displayed three women discussing politics who come to the conclusion that "it is better to be deaf than to listen to that".

On 2 September 2018, his first English language American film The Sisters Brothers had its world premiere at the Venice Film Festival.

In 2022, a five episode special about Audiard's pre-production process was released by Télérama. It was revealed that Audiard was in development of a script adaptation of the opera libretto Emilia Pérez, this would mark the first time Audiard has written a film alone. Filming began in the summer of 2023 with Selena Gomez and Zoe Saldaña. The film premiere at the 77th Cannes Film Festival on May 18, 2024. It later won the Jury Prize, and its female ensemble won the Best Actress award at the festival. It went on to be selected as the French entry for Best International Feature Film at the 97th Academy Awards.

== Controversies ==
=== Emilia Pérez on Mexican representation ===
Jacques Audiard’s Emilia Pérez faced significant criticism for its portrayal of Mexico. The film, a Spanish-language musical set in Mexico, was shot entirely in a studio near Paris with a predominantly non-Mexican cast and crew. Many Mexican audiences and critics found its depiction of their country stereotypical, reducing it to a landscape of violence, drug cartels, and gangsters, while using the real-life crisis of missing persons as a backdrop for musical numbers. Héctor Guillén labeled the film a “racist Eurocentrist mockery,” even calling on the Academy to take note of Mexico’s disapproval. In response, Mexican trans filmmaker Camila Aurora created Johanne Sacreblu, a parody that exaggerated French stereotypes, as a form of critique. Initially, Audiard seemed dismissive of the backlash, stating, “I didn’t study [Mexico] much. What I needed to know I already knew a little bit”. However, at a press conference in Mexico, he later apologized, acknowledging the concerns.

The controversy deepened on August 21, 2024, when Audiard stated in an interview with Konbini, a French digital media platform, that “Spanish is a language of emerging, developing countries, of modest people, of the poor, and of migrants”. Following further criticism, the director attempted to clarify his remarks, claiming they had been taken out of context and did not reflect his appreciation for the Spanish language or the cultures that speak it.

== Filmography ==
=== Feature film ===
Year	English Title	Original title	Notes
1994	See How They Fall	Regarde les hommes tomber	César Award for Best First Film
1996	A Self-Made Hero	Un héros très discret	Cannes Film Festival Award for Best Screenplay
2001	Read My Lips	Sur mes lèvres	César Award for Best Original Screenplay or Adaptation
2005	The Beat That My Heart Skipped	De battre mon cœur s'est arrêté	César Award for Best Film; César Award for Best Director; César Award for Best Adaptation
2009	A Prophet	Un prophète	Grand Prix (Cannes Film Festival); César Award for Best Film; César Award for Best Director; César Award for Best Original Screenplay
2012	Rust and Bone	De rouille et d'os	Also producer César Award for Best Adaptation
2015	Dheepan		Uncredited producer Palme d'Or
2018	The Sisters Brothers		Silver Lion for Best Direction; César Award for Best Director
2021	Paris, 13th District	Les Olympiades	Uncredited producer
2024	Emilia Pérez		Also producer and co-lyricist Jury Prize (Cannes Film Festival); Academy Award for Best Original Song; César Award for Best Film; César Award for Best Director; César Award for Best Adaptation

=== Only screenwriter ===
Year	Title
1974	Kisses Till Monday
1981	The Professional
1983	Deadly Circuit
1984	Réveillon chez Bob
1985	All Mixed Up
1987	Killing Time
1988	Saxo
1988	Fréquence meurtre
1989	Baxter
1989	Australia
1991	Swing troubadour
1992	Confessions d'un Barjo
1994	Dead Tired
1999	Venus Beauty Institute

=== Short film ===
Year	Title
1998	Norme française

=== Television ===
Year	Title	Director	Writer	Notes
1984	Black Sequence	No	Yes	Episode "L'ennemi public n° 2"
2020	The Bureau	Yes	Yes	Directed 2 episodes, wrote 4 episodes

== Awards and nominations ==
Year	Association	Category	Nominated work	Result	Ref.
1994	Cannes Film Festival	Caméra d'Or	See How They Fall	Nominated	
1995	César Award	Best First Feature	See How They Fall	Won	
1995	César Award	Best Original Screenplay or Adaptation	See How They Fall	Nominated	
1996	Cannes Film Festival	Palme d'Or	A Self-Made Hero	Nominated	
1996	Cannes Film Festival	Best Screenplay Award	A Self-Made Hero	Won	
1996	Valladolid International Film Festival	Golden Spike	A Self-Made Hero	Nominated	
1996	Valladolid International Film Festival	Silver Spike	A Self-Made Hero	Won	
1996	Stockholm Film Festival	Bronze Horse	A Self-Made Hero	Nominated	
1996	Stockholm Film Festival	Best Screenplay	A Self-Made Hero	Won	
1997	César Award	Best Director	A Self-Made Hero	Nominated	
1997	César Award	Best Original Screenplay or Adaptation	A Self-Made Hero	Nominated	
2002	César Award	Best Film	Read My Lips	Nominated	
2002	César Award	Best Director	Read My Lips	Nominated	
2002	César Award	Best Original Screenplay or Adaptation	Read My Lips	Won	
2002	Newport International Film Festival	Best Director	Read My Lips	Won	
2002	European Film Award	Best Screenwriter	Read My Lips	Nominated	
2005	Berlin International Film Festival	Golden Bear	The Beat That My Heart Skipped	Nominated	
2005	Tribeca Festival	Jury Award	The Beat That My Heart Skipped	Nominated	
2005	Seville European Film Festival	Golden Giraldillo	The Beat That My Heart Skipped	Won	
2005	European Film Awards	Best Director	The Beat That My Heart Skipped	Nominated	
2006	Étoiles D'Or	Best Film	The Beat That My Heart Skipped	Won	
2006	Étoiles D'Or	Best Director	The Beat That My Heart Skipped	Won	
2006	Institut Lumière	Jacques Deray Prize	The Beat That My Heart Skipped	Won	
2006	Globes de Cristal Award	Best Film	The Beat That My Heart Skipped	Won	
2006	Lumière Awards	Best Film	The Beat That My Heart Skipped	Won	
2006	BAFTA Award	Best Film Not in the English Language	The Beat That My Heart Skipped	Won	
2006	César Award	Best Film	The Beat That My Heart Skipped	Won	
2006	César Award	Best Director	The Beat That My Heart Skipped	Won	
2006	César Award	Best Adaptation	The Beat That My Heart Skipped	Won	
2006	French Syndicate of Cinema Critics	Best French Film	The Beat That My Heart Skipped	Won	
2006	British Independent Film Award	Best Foreign Independent Film	The Beat That My Heart Skipped	Nominated	
2009
2009	BAFTA Award	Best Film Not in the English Language	A Prophet	Won	
2009	BFI London Film Festival	Best Film	A Prophet	Won	
2009	British Independent Film Awards	Best Foreign Independent Film	A Prophet	Won	
2009	Cannes Film Festival	Palm d'Or	A Prophet	Nominated	
2009	Cannes Film Festival	Grand Prix	A Prophet	Won	
2009	César Award	Best Film	A Prophet	Won	
2009	César Award	Best Director	A Prophet	Won	
2009	César Award	Best Original Screenplay	A Prophet	Won	
2009	Chicago Film Critics Association	Best Foreign Language Film	A Prophet	Won	
2009	David di Donatello Award	Best European Film	A Prophet	Nominated	
2009	Dublin Film Critics' Circle	Best Director	A Prophet	Won	
2009	European Film Award	Best Film	A Prophet	Nominated	
2009	European Film Award	Best Director	A Prophet	Nominated	
2009	European Film Award	Best Screenwriter	A Prophet	Nominated	
2009	French Syndicate of Cinema Critics	Best French Film	A Prophet	Won	
2009	Globes de Cristal Award	Best Film	A Prophet	Won	
2009	Independent Spirit Award	Best Foreign Film	A Prophet	Nominated	
2009	London Film Critics' Circle	Film of the Year	A Prophet	Won	
2009	Lumière Awards	Best Film	A Prophet	Nominated	
2009	Lumière Awards	Best Director	A Prophet	Won	
2009	Lumière Awards	Best Screenplay	A Prophet	Nominated	
2009	National Board of Review	Best Foreign Language Film	A Prophet	Won	
2010	Goya Award	Best European Film	A Prophet	Nominated	
2012	BAFTA Award	Best Film Not in the English Language	Rust and Bone	Nominated	
2012	British Independent Film Award	Best Foreign Independent Film	Rust and Bone	Nominated	
2012	BFI London Film Festival Award	Best Film	Rust and Bone	Won	
2012	Cannes Film Festival	Palme d'Or	Rust and Bone	Nominated	
2012	César Award	Best Film	Rust and Bone	Nominated	
2012	César Award	Best Director	Rust and Bone	Nominated	
2012	César Award	Best Adaptation	Rust and Bone	Won	
2012	Critics' Choice Movie Award	Best Foreign Language Film	Rust and Bone	Nominated	
2012	Globes de Cristal Award	Best Film	Rust and Bone	Won	
2012	Goya Award	Best European Film	Rust and Bone	Nominated	
2012	Independent Spirit Award	Best Foreign Film	Rust and Bone	Nominated	
2012	London Film Critics' Circle	Foreign Language Film of the Year	Rust and Bone	Won	
2012	Lumière Awards	Best Film	Rust and Bone	Nominated	
2012	Lumière Awards	Best Director	Rust and Bone	Won	
2012	Lumière Awards	Best Screenplay	Rust and Bone	Won	
2015	Cannes Film Festival	Palme d'Or	Dheepan	Won	
2015	Films from the South	Audience Award	Dheepan	Won	
2016	Lumière Awards	Best Film	Dheepan	Nominated	
2016	Lumière Awards	Best Director	Dheepan	Nominated	
2016	César Award	Best Film	Dheepan	Nominated	
2016	César Award	Best Director	Dheepan	Nominated	
2016	César Award	Best Original Screenplay	Dheepan	Nominated	
2016	Amanda Award	Best Foreign Feature Film	Dheepan	Nominated	
2016	Miami Film Festival	Grand Jury - Knight Competition	Dheepan	Won	
2017	BAFTA Awards	Best Film Not in the English Language	Dheepan	Nominated	
2018	Venice Film Festival	Golden Lion	The Sisters Brothers	Nominated	
2018	Venice Film Festival	Silver Lion for Best Director	The Sisters Brothers	Won	
2018	San Sebastian International Film Festival	City of Donostia Audience Award	The Sisters Brothers	Nominated	
2018	Louis Delluc Prize	Best Film	The Sisters Brothers	Nominated	
2019			The Sisters Brothers		
2019	Lumière Awards	Best Film	The Sisters Brothers	Won	
2019	Lumière Awards	Best Director	The Sisters Brothers	Won	
2019	César Awards	Best Film	The Sisters Brothers	Nominated	
2019	César Awards	Best Director	The Sisters Brothers	Won	
2019	César Awards	Best Adaptation	The Sisters Brothers	Nominated	
2019	Almería Western Film Festival	Best Feature	The Sisters Brothers	Won	
2020	Magritte Awards	Best Foreign Film in Co-production	The Sisters Brothers	Nominated	
2021	Cannes Film Festival	Palme d'Or	Paris, 13th District	Nominated	
2021	Cannes Film Festival	Queer Palm	Paris, 13th District	Nominated	
2021	Chicago International Film Festival	Gold Hugo	Paris, 13th District	Nominated	
2021	Chicago International Film Festival	Gold Q-Hugo	Paris, 13th District	Nominated	
2021	Chicago International Film Festival	Out of Look Competition - Special Mention	Paris, 13th District	Won	
2021	Hamburg Film Festival	Art Cinema Award	Paris, 13th District	Won	
2021	Seville European Film Festival	Golden Giraldillo	Paris, 13th District	Nominated	
2022	Lumière Awards	Best Director	Paris, 13th District	Nominated	
2022	Cesar Awards	Best Adaptation	Paris, 13th District	Nominated	
2022	Cleveland International Film Festival	International Narrative Competition - Best Feature Film	Paris, 13th District	Nominated	
2023	Polish Film Awards	Best European Film	Paris, 13th District	Nominated	
2024	Cannes Film Festival	Palme d'Or	Emilia Pérez	Nominated	
2024	Cannes Film Festival	Jury Prize	Emilia Pérez	Won	
2024	Cannes Film Festival	Queer Palm	Emilia Pérez	Nominated	
2024	Toronto International Film Festival	People's Choice Award	Emilia Pérez	Runner-up	
2024	San Sebastian International Film Festival	Sebastiane Award	Emilia Pérez	Nominated	
2024	San Sebastian International Film Festival	Audience Award	Emilia Pérez	Nominated	
2024	Mill Valley Film Festival	Audience Favorite ¡Viva el cine!	Emilia Pérez	Won	
2024	Denver Film Festival	Rare Pearl Award	Emilia Pérez	Won	
2024	New Orleans Film Festival	Narrative Feature	Emilia Pérez	Nominated	
2024	Hollywood Music in Media Awards	Best Original Song – Feature Film for "El Mal"	Emilia Pérez	Nominated	
2024	Hollywood Music in Media Awards	Music Themed Film, Biopic or Musical	Emilia Pérez	Won	
2024	Seville European Film Festival	Puerta América Award	Emilia Pérez	Nominated	
2024	Stockholm International Film Festival	FIPRESCI Best Film	Emilia Pérez	Won	
2024	Stockholm International Film Festival	Audience Award	Emilia Pérez	Won	
2024	European Film Awards	Best Film	Emilia Pérez	Won	
2024	European Film Awards	Best Director	Emilia Pérez	Won	
2024	European Film Awards	Best Screenwriter	Emilia Pérez	Won	
2024	Astra Film and Creative Arts Awards	Best Picture	Emilia Pérez	Nominated	
2024	Astra Film and Creative Arts Awards	Best Director	Emilia Pérez	Nominated	
2024	Astra Film and Creative Arts Awards	Best International Feature	Emilia Pérez	Won	
2024	Washington D.C. Area Film Critics Association Awards	Best International Film	Emilia Pérez	Won	
2024	Chicago Film Critics Association Awards	Best Foreign Language Film	Emilia Pérez	Nominated	
2024	St. Louis Film Critics Association Awards	Best International Feature Film	Emilia Pérez	Nominated	
2024	New York Film Critics Online Awards	Best Picture	Emilia Pérez	Nominated	
2024	New York Film Critics Online Awards	Best Director	Emilia Pérez	Nominated	
2024	New York Film Critics Online Awards	Best Screenplay	Emilia Pérez	Nominated	
2024	New York Film Critics Online Awards	Best International Feature	Emilia Pérez	Nominated	
2024	Indiana Film Journalists Association	Best Foreign Language Film	Emilia Pérez	Nominated	
2024	Indiana Film Journalists Association	Best Adapted Screenplay	Emilia Pérez	Nominated	
2024	Indiana Film Journalists Association	Original Vision	Emilia Pérez	Nominated	
2025	Palm Springs International Film Festival	Vanguard Award	Emilia Pérez	Won	
2025	Palm Springs International Film Festival	FIPRESCI Best International Film	Emilia Pérez	Nominated	
2025	Golden Globe Awards	Best Motion Picture – Musical or Comedy	Emilia Pérez	Won	
2025	Golden Globe Awards	Best Director	Emilia Pérez	Nominated	
2025	Golden Globe Awards	Best Screenplay	Emilia Pérez	Nominated	
2025	Golden Globe Awards	Best Motion Picture – Non-English Language	Emilia Pérez	Won	
2025	Golden Globe Awards	Best Original Song for "El Mal"	Emilia Pérez	Won	
2025	AARP Movies for Grownups Awards	Best Picture/Best Movie for Grownups	Emilia Pérez	Nominated	
2025	AARP Movies for Grownups Awards	Best Director	Emilia Pérez	Won	
2025	AARP Movies for Grownups Awards	Best Screenwriter	Emilia Pérez	Nominated	
2025	Critics' Choice Movie Awards	Best Picture	Emilia Pérez	Nominated	
2025	Critics' Choice Movie Awards	Best Director	Emilia Pérez	Nominated	
2025	Critics' Choice Movie Awards	Best Adapted Screenplay	Emilia Pérez	Nominated	
2025	Critics' Choice Movie Awards	Foreign Language Film	Emilia Pérez	Won	
2025	Critics' Choice Movie Awards	Best Song for "El Mal"	Emilia Pérez	Won	
2025	Lumière Awards	Best Film	Emilia Pérez	Won	
2025	Lumière Awards	Best Director	Emilia Pérez	Won	
2025	Lumière Awards	Best Screenplay	Emilia Pérez	Won	
2025	Alliance of Women Film Journalists	Best Film	Emilia Pérez	Nominated	
2025	Alliance of Women Film Journalists	Best Director	Emilia Pérez	Nominated	
2025	Alliance of Women Film Journalists	Best Screenplay, Adapted	Emilia Pérez	Nominated	
2025	Alliance of Women Film Journalists	Best International Film	Emilia Pérez	Nominated	
2025	Academy Awards	Best Picture	Emilia Pérez	Nominated	
2025	Academy Awards	Best Director	Emilia Pérez	Nominated	
2025	Academy Awards	Best Adapted Screenplay	Emilia Pérez	Nominated	
2025	Academy Awards	Best Original Song	Emilia Pérez	Won	
2025	César Awards	Best Film	Emilia Pérez	Won	
2025	César Awards	Best Director	Emilia Pérez	Won	
2025	César Awards	Best Adaptation	Emilia Pérez	Won	

Directed Academy Award performances
Under Audiard's direction, these actors have received Academy Award wins and nominations for their performances in their respective roles.

Year	Performer	Film	Result
Academy Award for Best Actress
2024	Karla Sofía Gascón	Emilia Pérez	Nominated
Academy Award for Best Supporting Actress
2024	Zoe Saldaña	Emilia Pérez	Won

== Honorary awards ==
Association	Year	Category	Result	Ref.
Filmfest Hamburg	2024	Douglas Sirk Award	Honored	
Morelia International Film Festival	2024	Artistic Excellence Award	Honored	
Stockholm International Film Festival	2012	Stockholm Visionary Award	Honored	
Telluride Film Festival	2024	Silver Medallion	Honored	
Valladolid International Film Festival	2013	Espiga de Honor	Honored	
