= A Self-Made Hero =

1996 film by Jacques Audiard

- French poster
- Un héros très discret
- Directed by: Jacques Audiard
- Written by: Jacques Audiard; Alain Le Henry; Jean-François Deniau (novel)
- Based on: Un héros très discret by Jean-François Deniau
- Produced by: Françoise Galfré; Patrick Godeau
- Starring: Mathieu Kassovitz; Albert Dupontel
- Cinematography: Jean-Marc Fabre
- Edited by: Juliette Welfling
- Music by: Alexandre Desplat
- Production companies: Alicéléo; Lumière
- Distributed by: AFMD
- Release date: 15 May 1996
- Running time: 107 minutes
- Country: France
- Language: French
- Budget: $4.4 million
- Box office: $4.4 million

A Self-Made Hero (French: Un héros très discret) is a 1996 French film directed by Jacques Audiard. It is based on the novel by Jean-François Deniau.

== Synopsis ==
The film is presented in the style of a historical documentary, with an elderly Dehousse narrating the events of his life, interspersed with interviews with other characters and historians.

Albert Dehousse has grown up on heroic novels, unfortunately his life isn't quite so exciting. Albert lives in a village in northern France with his mother, who lives in memory of her husband, who she claims died a hero in the First World War. As a child, Albert learns that his father in fact died of cirrhosis of the liver. When the Second World War begins, Albert is not called up as he is the only child of a war widow, denying him his chance to become a hero. He marries Yvette Caron, a local girl, and works for her father as a sales agent. Following the liberation of France, Madame Dehousse is revealed to have been a collaborator and is persecuted by the French Resistance. Albert learns that his father-in-law is the head of a local Resistance network. Devastated by the revelation, he leaves his family for Paris.

In Paris, he is taken under the wing of Captain Dionnet, a homosexual Free French fighter, who finds Albert a place to stay in a local brothel. The Captain advises Albert that in the chaos of postwar France it is possible for a man to become anything, even a Resistance fighter. Albert begins a relationship with Odette, one of the girls at the brothel, while working for Monsieur Jo, a rich collaborationist, and memorising Jo's list of contacts. Eventually, Jo is arrested, and at the same time the Captain enlists to fight in Germany, having fallen in love with an American soldier. He leaves Albert a note reiterating his advice.

Albert takes a room near the Army School with the Louvier family. He learns all he can about the Resistance and leads the Louviers to believe that he was a Lieutenant in the Free French army. Through careful observation, study and bluffing, together with his memories of the Captain's stories, he manages to gain access to Resistance circles and eventually befriends many veterans. Interviews with veterans later in life show that many of them seem to recall having met him in London during the war. When he encounters an officer who recalls the name Dehousse (having dealt with Albert's mother's application for a pension) Albert claims that "Dehousse" is a pseudonym and he is actually a Polish Jew called Rozinsky, taking the name of former tenants of the Louviers who were captured and deported during the war. Eventually, on the strength of his network and popularity, and his extensive memory of names of collaborators from his time with M. Jo, Albert is given a junior government position advising on suitability of appointments. At a social event, he meets Servane, the mistress of an officer, who indicates her desire for him, but he is called away before their relationship can progress.

After the fall of Germany, Albert is appointed to a general's staff in French-occupied Germany, working in psychological operations in Baden-Baden with the rank of Lieutenant-Colonel. On his way through Germany, he briefly crosses paths with the Captain, who is delighted to see what has become of Albert. Although initially coldly-received by his junior officers, Albert wins them over with his gracious manner. One officer, Boutin, becomes suspicious of him after Albert claims to be suffering from an old bullet wound to excuse a poor performance at tennis, but is unable to persuade any of his colleagues. Boutin tells the viewer that he was later killed fighting in French Indochina. Servane is posted to Baden-Baden and she and Albert begin a relationship. Eventually, after she questions him, Albert admits that his backstory is a forgery.

The next morning, Albert's unit is called to investigate a raid on a village by what are believed to be SS resistance members. The group turn out to be French members of the Charlemagne Division, who cannot return to France for fear of punishment and are stealing to survive. Rather than send them back to France to be tried and shot, Albert orders them to be executed by firing squad on the spot. Traumatised, he writes a letter to the French command confessing the truth about his background. To avoid the risk of a major scandal, he is dealt with quietly. The only charges he faces are for bigamy, having married Servane in 1946, for which he serves three years in prison. Yvette tracks him down and she and Servane become friends.

The film closes with a series of anecdotes about other accomplishments or scams by "Dehousse", while the elderly Dehousse asks the viewer if he was convincing.

== About the film ==
"Les vies les plus belles sont celles qu'on s'invente", (the most beautiful lives are those we invent) announces an older Albert Dehousse at the beginning of the film. Un héros très discret is a film which investigates the divide between fantasy and reality.

== Cast ==
- Mathieu Kassovitz : Albert Dehousse
- Albert Dupontel : Dionnet
- Anouk Grinberg : Servane
- Sandrine Kiberlain : Yvette
- Nadia Barentin : General's wife
- Bernard Bloch : Ernst
- François Chattot : Louvier
- Philippe Duclos : Caron
- Danièle Lebrun : Madame Dehousse
- Clotilde Mollet : Odette
- François Berléand : Monsieur Jo
- Philippe Nahon : The General
- Jean-Louis Trintignant : Albert Dehousse (old)
- Bruno Putzulu : Meyer
- François Levantal : Delavelle
- Armand de Baudry d'Asson : Englishman
- Wilfred Benaïche : Nervoix

== Awards and nominations ==
- Cannes Film Festival (France)
  - Won: Best Screenplay (Jacques Audiard and Alain Le Henry)
  - Nominated: Golden Palm (Jacques Audiard)
- César Awards (France)
  - Nominated: Best Actor – Supporting Role (Albert Dupontel)
  - Nominated: Best Actress – Supporting Role (Sandrine Kiberlain)
  - Nominated: Best Director (Jacques Audiard)
  - Nominated: Best Editing (Juliette Welfling)
  - Nominated: Best Music (Alexandre Desplat)
  - Nominated: Best Original Screenplay or Adaptation (Jacques Audiard and Alain Le Henry)
- Stockholm Film Festival (Sweden)
  - Won: Best Screenplay (Jacques Audiard and Alain Le Henry)
  - Nominated: Bronze Horse
- Valladolid Film Festival (Spain)
  - Won: Silver Spike (Jacques Audiard)
  - Nominated: Golden Spike (Jacques Audiard)

== See also ==
- Confessions of a Dangerous Mind
