= 14th César Awards =

1989 French film awards ceremony

- Date: 4 March 1989
- Site: Théâtre de l'Empire, Paris, France
- Hosted by: Pierre Tchernia

Highlights
- Best Film: Camille Claudel
- Best Actor: Jean-Paul Belmondo
- Best Actress: Isabelle Adjani

Television coverage
- Network: Antenne 2

The 14th César Awards ceremony, presented by the Académie des Arts et Techniques du Cinéma, honoured the best French films of 1988 and took place on 4 March 1989 at the Théâtre de l'Empire in Paris. The ceremony was chaired by Peter Ustinov and hosted by Pierre Tchernia. Camille Claudel won the award for Best Film.

== Winners and nominees ==
The winners are highlighted in bold:

=== Best Film ===
- **Camille Claudel**, directed by Bruno Nuytten
- Le Grand bleu, directed by Luc Besson
  La Lectrice, directed by Michel Deville
- L'Ours, directed by Jean-Jacques Annaud
- La Vie est un long fleuve tranquille, directed by Étienne Chatiliez

=== Best Foreign Film ===
- **Out of Rosenheim**, directed by Percy Adlon
- Bird, directed by Clint Eastwood
- Salaam Bombay!, directed by Mira Nair
- Who Framed Roger Rabbit, directed by Robert Zemeckis

=== Best Debut ===
- **La Vie est un long fleuve tranquille**, directed by Étienne Chatiliez
- Camille Claudel directed by Bruno Nuytten
- Chocolat, directed by Claire Denis
- Drôle d'endroit pour une rencontre, directed by François Dupeyron

=== Best Actor ===
- **Jean-Paul Belmondo**, for Itinéraire d'un enfant gâté
- Gérard Depardieu, for Camille Claudel
- Jean-Marc Barr, for Le Grand bleu
- Richard Anconina, for Itinéraire d'un enfant gâté
- Daniel Auteuil, for Quelques jours avec moi

=== Best Actress ===
- **Isabelle Adjani**, for Camille Claudel
- Catherine Deneuve, for Drôle d'endroit pour une rencontre
- Miou-Miou, for La Lectrice
  Charlotte Gainsbourg, for La Petite voleuse
- Isabelle Huppert, for Une affaire de femmes

=== Best Supporting Actor ===
- **Patrick Chesnais**, for La Lectrice
- Alain Cuny, for Camille Claudel
- Jean Reno, for Le Grand bleu
  Jean-Pierre Marielle, for Quelques jours avec moi
- Patrick Bouchitey, for La Vie est un long fleuve tranquille

=== Best Supporting Actress ===
- **Hélène Vincent**, for La vie est un long fleuve tranquille
- María Casares, for La lectrice
- Dominique Lavanant, for Quelques jours avec moi
- Françoise Fabian, for Trois places pour le 26
- Marie Trintignant, for Une affaire de femmes

=== Most Promising Actor ===
- **Stéphane Freiss**, for Chouans!
- Thomas Langmann, for Les années sandwiches
- Laurent Grévill, for Camille Claudel
- François Négret, for De bruit et de fureur

=== Most Promising Actress ===
- **Catherine Jacob**, for La vie est un long fleuve tranquille
- Nathalie Cardone, for Drôle d'endroit pour une rencontre
- Clotilde de Bayser, for L'enfance de l'art
- Ingrid Held, for La maison assassinée

=== Best Director ===
- **Jean-Jacques Annaud**, for L'ours
- Luc Besson, for Le grand bleu
- Michel Deville, for La lectrice
- Claude Miller, for La petite voleuse
- Claude Chabrol, for Une affaire de femmes

=== Best Original Screenplay or Adaptation ===
- **Étienne Chatiliez and Florence Quentin**, for La vie est un long fleuve tranquille
- François Dupeyron, for Drôle d'endroit pour une rencontre
- Rosalinde Deville, Michel Deville, for La lectrice
- Claude de Givray, Annie Miller, Claude Miller, François Truffaut, Luc Béraud, for La Petite voleuse

=== Best Cinematography ===
- **Pierre Lhomme**, for Camille Claudel
- Carlo Varini, for Le grand bleu
- Philippe Rousselot, for L'ours

=== Best Costume Design ===
- **Dominique Borg**, for Camille Claudel
- Yvonne Sassinot de Nesle, for Chouans!
- Elisabeth Tavernier, for La vie est un long fleuve tranquille

=== Best Sound ===
- **Pierre Befve, Gérard Lamps, François Groult**, for Le grand bleu
- Guillaume Sciama, Dominique Hennequin, François Groult, for Camille Claudel
- Bernard Leroux, Claude Villand, Laurent Quaglio, for L'ours

=== Best Editing ===
- **Noëlle Boisson**, for L'ours
- Joëlle Hache, Jeanne Kef, for Camille Claudel
- Raymonde Guyot, for La lectrice

=== Best Music ===
- **Éric Serra**, for Le Grand bleu
- Gabriel Yared, for Camille Claudel
- Francis Lai, for Itinéraire d'un enfant gâté

=== Best Production Design ===
- **Bernard Vézat**, for Camille Claudel
- Thierry Leproust, for La Lectrice
- Bernard Evein, for Trois places pour le 26

=== Best Animated Short ===
- **L'Escalier chimérique**, directed by Daniel Guyonnet
- "La Princesse des diamants", directed by Michel Ocelot
- Le Travail du fer, directed by Celia Canning, Néry Catineau

=== Best Fiction Short Film ===
- **Lamento**, directed by François Dupeyron
- Big Bang, directed by Eric Woreth
- New York 1935, directed by Michèle Ferrand-Lafaye
- Une femme pour l'hiver, directed by Manuel Flèche

=== Best Documentary Short Film ===
- **Chet's Romance**, directed by Bertrand Fèvre
- Classified People, directed by Yolande Zauberman
- Devant le mur, directed by Daisy Lamothe

=== Honorary César ===
- Bernard Blier
  Paul Grimault

== See also ==
- 61st Academy Awards
- 42nd British Academy Film Awards
