= The Chinese Puzzle =

Chinese Puzzle may refer to:

- The Chinese Puzzle (play), a play by Frances Barclay and Leon M. Lion
- The Chinese Puzzle (1919 film), a 1919 film adaptation
- The Chinese Puzzle (1932 film), a 1932 film adaptation starring Austin Trevor
- The Chinese Puzzle (TV series), a 1974 British children's television series
- Chinese Puzzle, a 2013 film directed by Cédric Klapisch
- Chinese Puzzle, a 2013 song by Kraked Unit

== See also ==
- Puzzle box
- Mechanical puzzle
- Chinese finger puzzle
- Chinese rings puzzle
- Puzzles
