= Kelly Reilly =

English actress (born 1977)

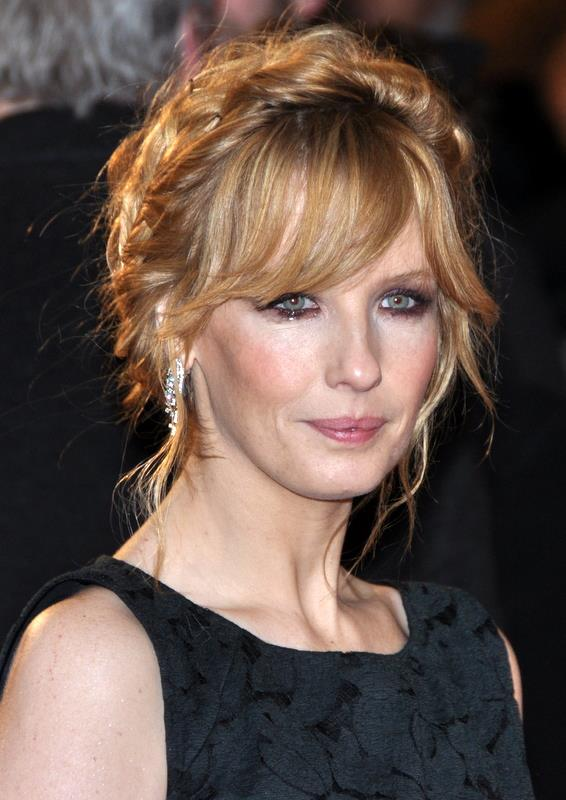
- Reilly in 2013
- Born: Jessica Kelly Siobhán Reilly; 18 July 1977 (age 49); Chessington, Greater London, England
- Occupation: Actress
- Years active: 1995–present
- Spouse: Kyle Baugher (m. 2012)

Jessica Kelly Siobhán Reilly (born 18 July 1977) is an English actress. Her television work includes starring roles in the British crime drama Above Suspicion (2009–2012), the American psychological medical drama Black Box (2014), the American anthology crime drama True Detective (2015) and the historical fantasy drama Britannia (2018). From 2018 to 2024, she played Beth Dutton on American neo-Western dramas Yellowstone, opposite Kevin Costner, and its spin-off Dutton Ranch (2026–present).

Reilly's film work began in 2000 in the English comedy Maybe Baby. She went on to have a supporting role in the romantic drama Pride & Prejudice (2005), a leading role in the horror thriller Eden Lake (2008), the role of Mary Morstan in the mystery action films Sherlock Holmes (2009) and its 2011 sequel Sherlock Holmes: A Game of Shadows, a leading role in the American drama Flight with Denzel Washington (2012), and the psychological thriller 10x10 with Luke Evans (2018).

She was nominated for a Laurence Olivier Award for her performance in After Miss Julie at the Donmar Warehouse (2003–2004).

== Early life ==
Reilly was born and raised in Chessington, the daughter of a hospital receptionist and Jack Reilly, a police officer. She attended Tolworth Girls' School in Tolworth, where she studied drama to obtain a GCSE. Her grandparents are Irish.

== Career ==
She first appeared on screen in 1995 on the series The Biz. Reilly wrote to the producers of the television drama Prime Suspect, starring Helen Mirren, to ask for work. Six months later she auditioned for a role in Prime Suspect 4: Inner Circle, which was broadcast on ITV on 7 May 1995. The following year, she appeared in an episode of the Carlton UK television period drama series Bramwell playing a disturbed young woman. She also played Tina, a tearaway, in Pie in the Sky. Six years later, she appeared alongside Mirren in the film Last Orders.

Her first professional role was followed by a series of parts on the English stage. She worked with Terry Johnson in four productions: Elton John's Glasses (1997), The London Cuckolds (1998), The Graduate (2000) and Piano/Forte (2006). Johnson wrote Piano/Forte for her and said, "Kelly is possibly the most natural, dyed-in-the-wool, deep-in-the-bone actress I've ever worked with." Reilly has stated that she learned the most as an actor from Karel Reisz, who directed her in The Yalta Game in Dublin in 2001. She said, "He was my masterclass. There is no way I would have been able to do Miss Julie if I hadn't done that play."

By 2000, Reilly felt she was being typecast in comedy roles, and put herself forward for the role of young Amy in Last Orders, directed by Fred Schepisi. This was followed by a role in the Royal Court's 2001 rerun of Sarah Kane's Blasted. The Times called her "theatrical Viagra". In 2002, Reilly starred alongside Audrey Tautou and Romain Duris as Wendy, an English Erasmus student, in the French comedy L'Auberge espagnole (The Spanish Apartment). Following its box office success, she reprised her role as Wendy in the 2005 sequel, Les Poupées russes (Russian Dolls) and again in the 2013 follow-up, Casse-tête chinois (Chinese Puzzle). In 2003 she played Mary Gerrard in Sad Cypress, an episode of ITV's Poirot series, then in 2005 roles in Mrs Henderson Presents and Pride & Prejudice.

Reilly's first lead role came in 2008 in the horror film Eden Lake and, in 2009, she had a high-profile role on prime-time British television in Above Suspicion. Reilly also appeared in three major films: Sherlock Holmes, Triage, and Me and Orson Welles.

In 2011, Reilly reprised her role as Mary Watson (née Morstan) in Sherlock Holmes: A Game of Shadows. In 2012, Reilly appeared opposite Sam Rockwell in A Single Shot and had a leading role in Robert Zemeckis' Flight opposite Denzel Washington. In 2014, Reilly starred with Greg Kinnear in the film Heaven is for Real and in the John Michael McDonagh film Calvary. The same year, Reilly starred in the short-lived ABC series, Black Box, as Catherine Black, a famed neuroscientist who explores and solves the mysteries of the brain (the black box) while hiding her own bipolar disorder from the world.

In 2015, Reilly starred in the second season of the television series True Detective as Jordan Semyon, the wife of Vince Vaughn's character, Frank Semyon. The same year, Reilly made her Broadway debut opposite Clive Owen and Eve Best in Harold Pinter's play Old Times at the American Airlines Theatre.

In 2016, she had a supporting role in Bastille Day. In 2017, Reilly played the Celtic Queen Kerra, confronting the Roman invasion of Britain in Sky TV's Britannia.

She was cast in the leading female role in the American series Yellowstone, a Paramount Network drama that debuted on 20 June 2018. Reilly plays Beth Dutton, the daughter of John Dutton, played by Kevin Costner. Reilly's and Costner's characters are constantly at war with several outside parties who want to gain control of the Duttons' family land. The series concluded in 2024, but in 2026 she reprised her role as a main character in the spin-off Dutton Ranch.

== Personal life ==
Reilly was engaged to actor Jonah Lotan in 2007. The following year, she dated director Guy Ritchie. In 2010, Kelly met Kyle Baugher, a financier, in Marfa, Texas. They married in Somerset in 2012.

== Filmography ==
Key
†	Denotes films that have not yet been released

=== Film ===
Year	Title	Role	Notes
2000	Maybe Baby	Nimnh	
2000	Peaches	Cherry	
2001	Last Orders	Young Amy	
2001	Starched	Maid	Short film
2002	The Spanish Apartment	Wendy	First film in Klapisch's trilogy
2003	Dead Bodies	Viv McCormack	
2004	The Libertine	Jane	
2005	Russian Dolls	Wendy	Second film in Klapisch's trilogy - same role
2005	Pride & Prejudice	Caroline Bingley	
2005	Mrs Henderson Presents	Maureen	
2007	Puffball	Liffey	
2008	Eden Lake	Jenny	
2008	Me and Orson Welles	Muriel Brassler	
2009	Sherlock Holmes	Mary Morstan	
2009	Triage	Diane	
2010	Meant to Be	Amanda	
2010	Ti presento un amico	Sarah	
2011	Citizen Gangster	Doreen Boyd	
2011	Sherlock Holmes: A Game of Shadows	Mary Watson	
2012	Flight	Nicole Maggen	
2013	A Single Shot	Jess	
2013	Chinese Puzzle	Wendy	Third film in Klapisch's trilogy - same role
2013	Innocence	Pamela Hamilton	
2014	Calvary	Fiona Lavelle	
2014	Heaven Is for Real	Sonja Burpo	
2014	Set Fire to the Stars	Caitlin	
2016	Bastille Day	Karen Dacre	as known as The Take
2018	10x10	Cathy Noland/Natalie-Ann Stevens	
2019	Eli	Rose	
2021	The Cursed	Isabelle Laurent	
2021	Promises	Laura	
2023	A Haunting in Venice	Rowena Drake	
2024	Little Wing	Maddie	
2024	Here	Rose Young	

=== Television ===
Year	Title	Role	Notes
1995	The Biz	Laura	
1995	Prime Suspect	Polly Henry	Miniseries; series 4 episodes "Inner Circles" and "The Scent of Darkness"
1996	The Ruth Rendell Mysteries	Kimberley	2 episodes
1996	Bramwell	Kathleen Le Saux	Episode: #2.5
1996	Poldark	Clowance Poldark	Unsuccessful pilot
1996	Sharman	Sophie Bright	Episode: #1.3
1997	Rebecca	Clarice	2 episodes
1997	Pie in the Sky	Tina	Episode: "The Apprentice"
1997	The History of Tom Jones, a Foundling	Nancy Miller	Miniseries; 3 episodes
1998	The Children of the New Forest	Patience Heatherstone	Miniseries
1999	Wonderful You	Nancy	5 episodes
1999	Sex 'n' Death	Julie	TV film
2002	The Safe House	Fiona "Finn" MacKenzie	TV film
2003	Poirot	Mary Gerrard	Episode: "Sad Cypress"
2006	A for Andromeda	Christine Jones / Andromeda	TV film
2007	Joe's Palace	Charlotte	TV film
2008	He Kills Coppers	Jeannie	Miniseries
2009–2012	Above Suspicion	DC/DS/DI Anna Travis	Main role (11 episodes)
2014	Black Box	Catherine Black	Main role (13 episodes); also producer
2015	True Detective	Jordan Semyon	Main role (8 episodes)
2018	Britannia	Kerra	Main role (9 episodes)
2018–2024	Yellowstone	Beth Dutton	Main role (53 episodes)
2023	Greek Salad	Wendy	3 episodes (same character as L'Auberge Espagnole above)
2026	Under Salt Marsh	Jackie Ellis	4 episodes
2026	Dutton Ranch	Beth Dutton	Main role (9 episodes)

== Awards and nominations ==
Reilly's performance in After Miss Julie at the Donmar Warehouse made her a star of the London stage and earned her a nomination for a Laurence Olivier Theatre Award for Best Actress of 2003. Aged 26, she was the youngest person ever nominated for that award. In 2005, she won Best Newcomer Award at the Cannes Film Festival for her role as Wendy in Russian Dolls (Les Poupées Russes). In 2006, Reilly won the Empire Award for Best Newcomer for her role in the British comedy film, Mrs Henderson Presents. She was nominated once again for an Olivier Award for her performance as Desdemona in the acclaimed production of Othello at the Donmar Warehouse in 2009. Reilly was nominated for Best Actress at the British Independent Film Awards for Eden Lake in 2010. She won the Spotlight Award at the 2012 Hollywood Film Festival for her performance as Nicole in Flight.

Year	Award	Category	Nominated work	Result
2005	Cannes Film Festival	Trophée Chopard	—N/a	Won
2005	César Awards	Best Supporting Actress	Russian Dolls	Nominated
2005	Empire Awards	Empire Award for Best Newcomer	Mrs Henderson Presents	Won
2005	British Independent Film Awards	Best Actress	Mrs Henderson Presents	Nominated
2005	London Film Critics' Circle	London Film Critics' Circle for British Newcomer of the Year	Mrs Henderson Presents	Won
2005	National Board of Review	National Board of Review Award for Best Cast	Mrs Henderson Presents	Won
2008	British Independent Film Awards	Best Actress	Eden Lake	Nominated
2008	Fright Meter Awards	Best Actress	Eden Lake	Nominated
2021	Hollywood Critics Association	Best Supporting Actress in a Broadcast Network or Cable Series, Drama	Yellowstone	Nominated
2022	Hollywood Critics Association	Best Actress in a Broadcast Network or Cable Series, Drama	Yellowstone	Nominated
2022	Gold Derby Awards	Best Drama Actress	Yellowstone	Nominated
2022	MTV Movie & TV Awards	Best Performance in a Show	Yellowstone	Nominated
2022	Actor Awards	Outstanding Performance by an Ensemble in a Drama Series	Yellowstone	Nominated
