= Russian Dolls (film) =

2005 film by Cédric Klapisch

- French theatrical release poster
- French: Les Poupées russes
- Directed by: Cédric Klapisch
- Written by: Cédric Klapisch
- Produced by: Matthew Justice; Bruno Levi
- Starring: Romain Duris; Audrey Tautou; Cécile de France; Kelly Reilly; Kevin Bishop; Evgenia Obraztsova
- Cinematography: Domininque Colon
- Edited by: Francine Sandberg
- Music by: Loïk Dury; Laurent Levesque
- Production companies: Ce qui me meut; StudioCanal; France 2 Cinéma; Lunar Films
- Distributed by: Mars Distribution (France); Cinefile World (United Kingdom)
- Release dates: 15 June 2005 (France); 5 May 2006 (United Kingdom)
- Running time: 125 minutes
- Countries: France; United Kingdom
- Languages: French; English; Russian
- Budget: €10.7 million
- Box office: $23.7 million

Russian Dolls (French: Les Poupées russes) is a 2005 romantic comedy-drama film, the sequel to L'Auberge espagnole (2002) and the second instalment in the "Spanish Apartment" trilogy, which is concluded with Chinese Puzzle (Casse-tête chinois, 2013). Cédric Klapisch wrote and directed the film, whose settings include Paris, London, Saint Petersburg and Moscow. Klapisch makes use of digital and split-screen effects in the film, as well as non-linear narrative.

== Plot ==
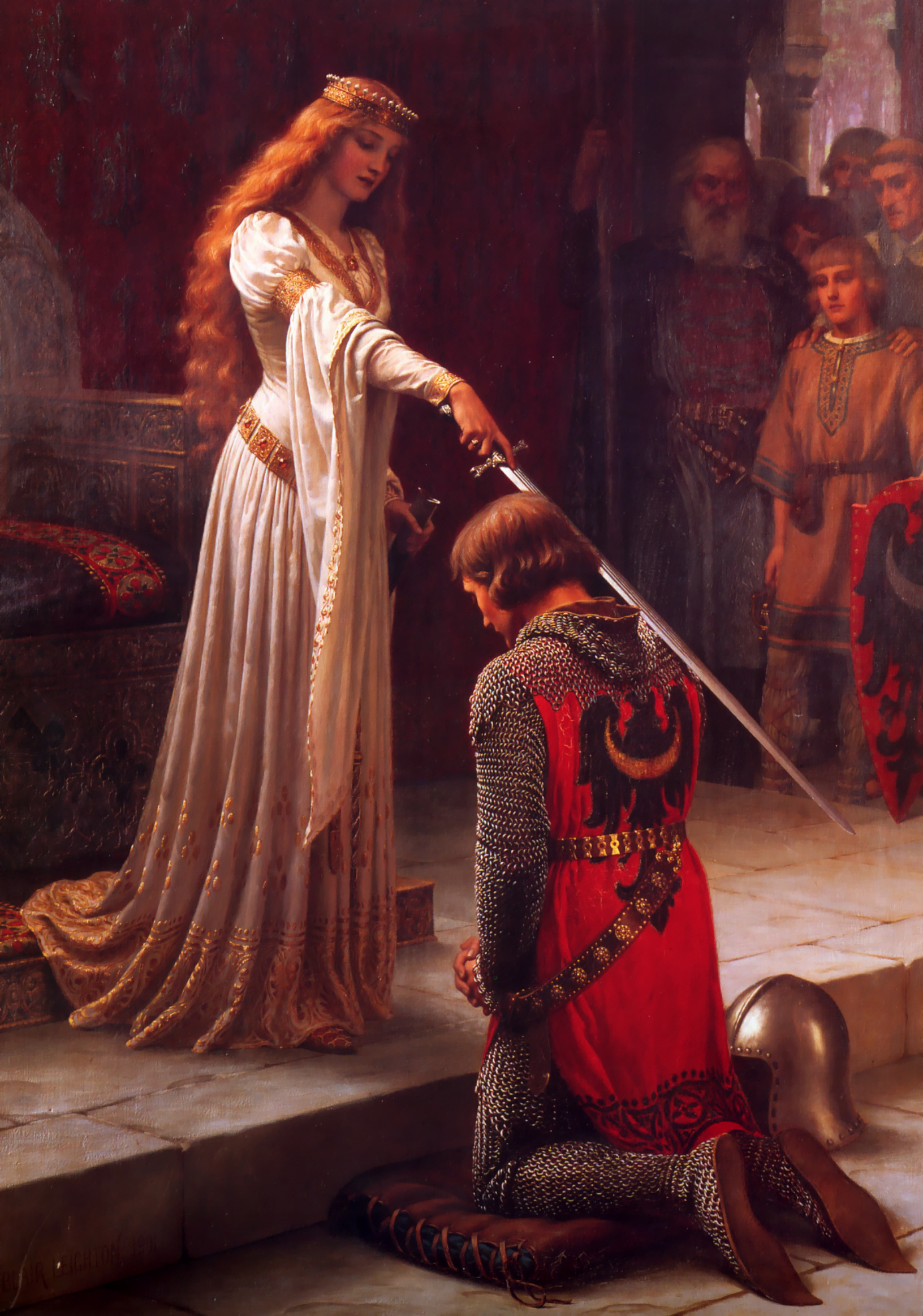
In a mid-credits scene, Wendy finishes a jigsaw puzzle of Edmund Leighton's painting The Accolade (1901).

Five years after spending a year studying economics in Barcelona, (Note: As depicted in L'Auberge espagnole (2002)) Xavier is aboard a Eurostar train typing on his laptop as he recounts the events of the past year.

At almost 30, Xavier is a struggling writer who has not yet found a publisher for his book The Spanish Inn, which details his experiences in Barcelona. To make ends meet, he works as a ghostwriter for autobiographies of celebrities, contributes freelance articles to magazines and writes scripts for a cheesy romance television film series titled Love and Passion in Venice. He remains close friends with his ex-girlfriend Martine, and occasionally looks after her son Lucas while she is away. Xavier has been single for a year, drifting through a series of casual flings.

Xavier stays with his lesbian Belgian friend Isabelle when he has to move out of his Paris apartment. When Xavier's grandfather asks to meet his fiancée, Xavier asks Isabelle to wear a dress and pose as his fiancée at a dinner at his grandfather's home. Later that night, Martine seeks solace with Xavier after Lucas's father picks him up. Xavier rebuffs Martine's advances but allows her to stay the night. The next morning, when Martine runs into Xavier's latest fling, Kassia, and Xavier dismisses Martine as a "nobody", both women walk away from him in disappointment.

When Love and Passion in Venice gets picked up as a BBC co-production, Xavier relocates to London to co-write the English adaptation with Wendy, who is now a TV writer and has recently broken up with her abusive boyfriend Edward. After accepting an offer to ghostwrite the memoirs of Celia Shelburn, a successful young model, Xavier now commutes between London and Paris. During one of Xavier's visits to Celia, the two kiss and sleep together. Back in London, Wendy rekindles her relationship with Edward, which leaves Xavier feeling confused. Xavier later kisses Wendy, and they have sex. When Edward shows up at Wendy's place and harasses her, Xavier firmly throws him out.

Xavier and Wendy travel to Saint Petersburg to visit her younger brother William, who is to marry Natacha, a Russian ballerina. When Celia calls Xavier and invites him to meet her in Moscow, Xavier lies to Wendy that he has to go to Moscow for work, unaware that Wendy saw Celia's name on his cellphone. Just before Xavier boards his train, Wendy declares her love for him. Xavier is stunned and remains on the train as Wendy leaves in tears. In Moscow, Xavier and Celia meet up and go to a nightclub together, but she ends up leaving him to go to another party with some friends, and he becomes disillusioned with her.

When Xavier returns to Saint Petersburg, Wendy avoids him and eventually breaks up with him over the phone, feeling that Xavier is constantly searching for the perfect woman. All of Xavier's former flatmates from Barcelona—Isabelle, Alessandro, Tobias, Lars and Soledad—arrive in Saint Petersburg for William and Natacha's wedding ceremony. At the wedding reception, Xavier and Wendy kiss and reconcile.

Xavier's train finally arrives at Waterloo Station in London, where Wendy has been waiting for him and greets him with a kiss.

== Cast ==
- Romain Duris as Xavier
- Kelly Reilly as Wendy
- Audrey Tautou as Martine
- Cécile de France as Isabelle
- Kevin Bishop as William
- Evgenia Obraztsova as Natacha
- Irene Montalà as Neus
- Gary Love as Edward
- Lucy Gordon as Celia Shelburn
- Aïssa Maïga as Kassia
- Martine Demaret as Xavier's mother
- Pierre Cassignard as Platane
- Olivier Saladin as Gérard
- Pierre Gérald as Xavier's grandfather
- Zinedine Soualem as M. Boubaker
- Hélène Médigue as M^{me} Vanpeteguem
- Carole Franck as the TV producer
- Robert Plagnol as the author of the series
- Nicolas Briançon as the director of the series
- Laura Weissbecker as Odile
- Frédérique Bel as Barbara
- Lannick Gautry as the snowboarder
- Federico D'Anna as Alessandro
- Barnaby Metschurat as Tobias
- Christian Pagh as Lars
- Cristina Brondo as Soledad

== Soundtrack ==
Original film score composed by Loïk Dury and Laurent Levesque. The soundtrack album reached number 25 in France.

=== Track listing ===
1. Da GrassRoots – "Démesure des mesures"
2. Da GrassRoots – "Body Language"
3. Kraked Unit – "En vrak"
4. Olivier Montel – "Disco King"
5. Kraked Unit – "Xavier la Fronde"
6. El Fudge – "One Fudge"
7. Kraked Unit – "La Ballade de Neus"
8. Kraked Unit – "Celia's Kiss"
9. Boban Marković – "Ivzorski biseri"
10. Beth Gibbons & Rustin Man – "Mysteries"
11. Kraked Unit – "C koi ce bordel"
12. Kraked Unit – "Poupées Russes"
13. Spleen – "Bitches on the Ground"
14. Kraked Unit – "La Reine des Queens"
15. Track Addicts – "Dutchy"

== Reception ==
The film was generally received well by critics, with a 72% fresh rating by the review aggregate website Rotten Tomatoes and a score of 67 from Metacritic.

=== Accolades ===
Award	Year	Category	Recipient(s)	Result	Ref.
César Awards	2006	Best Supporting Actress	Cécile de France	Won	
César Awards	2006	Best Supporting Actress	Kelly Reilly	Nominated	
César Awards	2006	Best Editing	Francine Sandberg	Nominated	
Globe de Cristal Awards	2006	Best Film	Cédric Klapisch	Nominated	
Chlotrudis Awards	2007	Best Performance by an Ensemble Cast		Nominated	
