= Matthew George Justice =

British media executive and producer

Matthew George Justice is a British film and television executive and producer. He became managing director of Big Talk Productions in 2007 and oversaw its sale to ITV Studios in 2013. Justice is an executive film producer with credits on Attack the Block, Man Up and Blade. He works as an executive television producer across comedy and drama shows such as BAFTA Award-winning Him & Her, Mum and Rev. In 2017, Justice brought back the drama series Cold Feet. Prior to Big Talk, Justice ran his own independent film production label Lunar Films and before that he worked as Stephen Norrington's producing partner. Justice is a governor of the British Film Institution.

== Early life and education ==
Justice was born on 1 November 1965 to father Brian Anthony Justice and mother Jean Rosemary Justice. He attended St Andrews University in Scotland, completing a BSC in Natural Sciences.

== Career ==
In January 1989, Justice started his career at the Moving Picture Company where he moved on to work as a commercials producer, most notably working on the Artiston advert which won the Golden Lion at Cannes and the British Television Advertising Awards (BTAA) - Gold in Post Production.

Justice served as a senior producer across Partizan's commercial and music video productions. He produced Michel Gondry's award-winning commercials for Smirnoff winning the Golden Lion at Cannes. Additionally the advertisement took home the Gold International and Gold Post Production prizes at the BTAA. Also whilst at Partizan he produced music videos for artists including Annie Lennox, Bomb the Bass and Skunk Anansie.

=== Film ===
Justice moved into film production and worked as an associate producer on The Freddie Mercury Tribute Concert directed by David Mallet (director). He then moved on to work as a producer executive on Philip Ridley's The Passion of the Darkly Noon. This led to his first collaboration with director Stephen Norrington on Death Machine. He later partnered with Norrington on multiple motion pictures.

In 1997, Justice moved to Los Angeles and in 1998 he produced Blade with director Stephen Norrington which gained him international status as the film became a box office triumph (distributed by New Line Cinema). He produced The Last Minute with Norrington for Palm Pictures before returning to the London to focus on the UK Independent Cinema market.

Justice served as head of production and director of business development providing structured finance to the entertainment industry.

Justice launched Lunar in May 2004 and produced six films in three years. The company quickly established itself as a leading UK independent production company, specialising in feature films for global theatrical distribution.

In 2005 Justice produced the multiple César-winning Russian Dolls distributed by Studio Canal starring award-winning Audrey Tatou and Romain Duris. In the same year Lunar released Boy Eats Girl distributed by Optimum featuring Samantha Mumba.

In 2006 he produced Raúl Ruiz' Moscow International Film Festival winner Klimt which features John Malkovich.

In Lunar Film's final year, 2007, Justice produced Sugarhouse which was distributed by Slingshot featuring Ashley Walters and award-winning Andy Serkis. This was followed by I Really Hate My Job distributed by The Works featuring Neve Campbell and Anna Maxwell Martin. He also produced the Berlin Silver Bear-winning Hallam Foe, distributed by Disney featuring Jamie Bell and Sophia Myles.

== Television ==
Justice joined Big Talk as managing director in 2007 and has overseen the re-structuring of the company for the past 11 years, including BBC Worldwide's investment in 2008 and the sale of Big Talk Productions to ITV Studios in 2013. Justice's executive producer TV highlights include multiple award-winning series Rev. (BBC Two) and Him & Her (BBC Three) both winning the BAFTA for situation comedy in 2011 and 2014, and Friday Night Dinner (Channel 4), its fifth series due to air in 2018.

Justice has worked in an executive producer role across Big Talk's TV shows, including Free Agents (US and UK versions) starring Sharon Horgan and Stephen Mangan in 2009. This was followed in 2012 by A Young Doctor’s Notebook (Sky Arts 1), starring Jon Hamm and Daniel Radcliffe with the second series winning a Broadcast Award for Best Multi-Channel Programme (2014).

From 2013 to 2015 Justice executive produced two series of Raised By Wolves, written by Caitlin and Caroline Moran, which has a US version currently being reimagined by Oscar winning writer Diablo Cody and three series of the comedy The Job Lot starring Sarah Hadland and Russell Tovey for ITV2. The following year (2014) he again worked as an executive producer on the drama series Our Zoo (BBC One) from the Oscar-nominated Matt Charman and Mr Sloane starring Nick Frost and Olivia Colman which launched on Sky Atlantic from Emmy award-winning writer and director Robert B. Weide.

In 2015, Justice fulfilled his executive producer role on comedy series Cockroaches (ITV2) written by Freddy Syborn (co-writer of The Bad Education Movie) and in 2016 on Crashing, written by, and starring multi-award-winning actress and playwright Phoebe Waller-Bridge (Channel 4), and the supernatural detective series Houdini & Doyle from House creator David Shore directed by Stephen Hopkins (Californication, 24). Later that year he was part of the Big Talk Productions team who relaunched the much loved BAFTA award-winning Cold Feet for ITV, with creator Mike Bullen and the original cast returning. To date, the show is ITV's biggest drama launch of 2016 with an audience of 8.4 million and a 33% total audience share. The show was then recommissioned. Additionally, he produced the BAFTA award-winning comedy series Mum (BBC Two) which was another product of the continuing collaboration between Big Talk and Him & Her creator Stefan Golaszewski.

In 2017 Justice and his longtime executive producing partner and CEO of Big Talk, Kenton Allen, worked on the seventh series of Cold Feet; a new comedy series Back written by Emmy Award-winning Simon Blackwell (Veep, In the Loop, Peep Show) starring David Mitchell and Robert Webb for Channel 4; Bliss for Sky Atlantic written and directed by acclaimed US writer/director/performer David Cross starring Heather Graham and Stephen Mangan; drama series Living the Dream and comedy series Timewasters.

== Personal life ==
Justice is married to writer Jessica Justice, they have two children.
