= Francine Sandberg =

French film editor

- Occupation: Film editor
- Years active: 1977–present
- Notable work: News from Home (1977); L'Auberge Espagnole (2002); Russian Dolls (2005); Paris (2008)
- Relatives: Serge Sandberg (grandfather)

Francine Sandberg is a French film editor. She is known for working as an editor for several films directed by Chantal Akerman and Cédric Klapisch, including News from Home (1977), L'Auberge Espagnole (2002), Russian Dolls (2005), and Paris (2008), and has been nominated three times for the César Award for Best Editing.

== Biography ==
Francine Sandberg was born as the daughter of Suzanne Sandberg, a film editor whose works include the 1959 film Head Against the Wall. Her grandfather Serge Sandberg was a film editor who worked on such films as Confessions of a Cheat and The Pearls of the Crown. Her brother Marc is a film historian.

She was the editor of News from Home (1977), directed by Chantal Akerman. Later, she was the editor of three more Chantal Akerman films: Les Rendez-vous d'Anna (1978), Les Années 80 (1983), and Night and Day (1991). She also worked with Cédric Klapisch on several other films he directed, namely Riens du tout (1992), Le Péril jeune (1994), When the Cat's Away (1996), Peut-être (1999), L'Auberge Espagnole (2002), Russian Dolls (2005), and Paris (2008).

She was nominated for the César Award for Best Editing at the 28th César Awards for L'Auberge Espagnole, but lost to To Be and to Have and its editor Nicolas Philibert. She was nominated for the César Award for Best Editing at the 31st César Awards for Russian Dolls, but lost to The Beat That My Heart Skipped and its editor Juliette Welfling. She was nominated for the César Award for Best Editing at the 34th César Awards for Paris, but lost to The First Day of the Rest of Your Life and its editor Sophie Reine.

She was the editor of Boy Meets Girl (1984), Vertiges (1985), Golden Eighties (1986), Family Resemblances (1996), Je ne vois pas ce qu'on me trouve (1997), Sauve-moi (2000), and The Milk of Human Kindness (2001).

== Filmography (as editor) ==
Year	Film	Ref
1977	News from Home	
1978	Les Rendez-vous d'Anna	
1983	Les Années 80	
1984	Boy Meets Girl	
1985	Vertiges	
1986	Golden Eighties	
1991	Night and Day	
1992	Riens du tout	
1994	Le Péril jeune	
1996	Family Resemblances	
1996	When the Cat's Away	
1997	Je ne vois pas ce qu'on me trouve	
1999	Peut-être	
2000	Sauve-moi	
2001	The Milk of Human Kindness	
2002	L'Auberge Espagnole	
2005	Russian Dolls	
2007	Michou d'Auber	
2008	Paris	
2010	My Father's Guests	
2011	My Piece of the Pie	

== Awards and nominations ==
Year	Title	Award	Result	Ref.
2003	L'Auberge Espagnole	César Award for Best Editing	Nominated	
2006	Russian Dolls	César Award for Best Editing	Nominated	
2009	Paris	César Award for Best Editing	Nominated	
