= Kraked Unit =

2000 French band

Kraked Unit is a French based band founded in 2000 by French composer and DJ Loïk Dury in collaboration with other musicians and composers. They focus on the creation of music for films, including films by Cédric Klapisch: L'auberge espagnole (2001), The Russian Dolls (2004), Paris (2008). They also compose music for catwalk shows by Karl Lagerfeld, Paco Rabanne and Kenzo. In 2021, they compose the sound identity of Radio France, including France Inter or FIP.

== Releases, Appearances ==
- 2002 – remix of "The Man With The Drum" by Allenko Brotherhood Ensemble appeared on their album Brotherhood and on Eclectic Aesthetic compilation
- 2005 – Les poupées russes (The Russian Dolls) OST, Up Music/WM France
- 2008 – Paris La Bande Originale du Film de Cédric Klapisch OST, Up Music/WM France
- 2009 – La Face Cachée des Fesses Arte
- 2013 – Chinese Puzzle
