= Paris (2008 film) =

Film by Cédric Klapisch

- Theatrical release poster
- Directed by: Cédric Klapisch
- Written by: Cédric Klapisch
- Produced by: Bruno Levy
- Starring: Juliette Binoche; Romain Duris; Fabrice Luchini; Albert Dupontel; François Cluzet; Karin Viard; Mélanie Laurent; Gilles Lellouche; Zinedine Soualem; Julie Ferrier
- Cinematography: Christophe Beaucarne
- Edited by: Francine Sandberg
- Music by: Loïk Dury; Robert "Chicken" Burke
- Production companies: Ce qui me meut; StudioCanal; France 2 Cinéma
- Distributed by: StudioCanal; Mars Distribution
- Release date: 20 February 2008
- Running time: 130 minutes
- Country: France
- Language: French
- Budget: €12.2 million
- Box office: $23.3 million

Paris is a 2008 French comedy-drama film written and directed by Cédric Klapisch. Starring an ensemble cast, the film depicts the stories of a diverse group of people living in Paris. It began shooting in November 2006 and was released in France on 20 February 2008. Its UK release was in July 2008.

== Plot ==
The film is set primarily in Paris, with one thread of the story set in Africa. Over the course of several months, various stories are intertwined, with different characters and plot threads intersecting.

- Pierre is a cabaret dancer who learns from a cardiologist that he has a severe heart condition and only a heart transplant can save him. Unable to dance anymore, he retires to his apartment and awaits a donor. He becomes reflective on his condition and his past life. He watches an old film of him as a dancer on stage, and calls an old girlfriend from his school days. He refuses to tell his parents of his medical condition. When he manages to leave the apartment, he notices several attractive young women, including Khadija and Laetitia.
- Élise, Pierre's sister, is a social worker, divorced with three children. One of the clients who visits the office is Mourad, a Cameroonian immigrant whose family is trying to obtain paperwork to authorize his brother Benoît's entry into France. Her office is on the brink of union contract negotiations, where her presence is needed. However, when she learns of Pierre's heart condition, she asks to go on part-time status, which bothers her co-workers. She sets up house in Pierre's apartment and begins to take care of him. She hosts a party for Pierre at one point to try to cheer him up. She also reflects on her single status and her attitudes towards men.
- Roland Verneuil is an academic at the Sorbonne and expert on the history of Paris who is envious of the seemingly "normal" life of his brother Philippe and his sister-in-law Mélanie. Roland is afraid of winding up like his mentor Professor Vignard, alone and totally absorbed in esoteric topics that are of no interest to the general public. Television producer Arthur Delamare offers Roland the chance to host and narrate a popular TV series about Paris, with the offer of a financially generous contract. Against his past inclinations, Roland accepts the offer. Roland also finds himself smitten with a student in his class, Laetitia, and begins to send her anonymous cell-phone text messages expressing his attraction to her.
- Jean is a vegetable market vendor who is separated from Caroline, another market worker. Caroline is about to leave the market and find work elsewhere, but tension still exists between the two. A lover of motorcycles, Caroline develops a budding relationship with Franky, another market employee who also rides a motorcycle. Jean notices Élise as she shops at the market with her children, and develops an attraction to her.
- Philippe Verneuil is a successful architect whose wife Mélanie is pregnant with their first child. Philippe and Roland's father has recently died. Philippe appears to have a content life with Mélanie, but he begins to have nightmares related to the major architectural project of a new urban center in Paris.
- Khadija, a student of North African background looking for a job, finds employment in a bakery, whose owner expresses prejudiced sentiments, but who likes Khadija nonetheless because she is a hard worker. Pierre notices Khadija when he shops at the bakery.
- Laetitia, a student at the Sorbonne, begins a relationship with Rémy, a fellow student. She has an apartment across the street from where Pierre lives. Élise poses as a survey taker to gain entry into Laetitia's apartment to learn if she has a boyfriend, intent on setting her up with Pierre. Laetitia begins receiving anonymous text messages from a secret admirer, whom she eventually learns is her professor, Roland. She is initially upset but soon engages in a brief affair with Roland.
- In Cameroon, Benoît works at a resort hotel. He has made an acquaintance with Marjolaine, a Parisian model, who tells him to contact her if he ever goes to Paris. His brother, Mourad, has mailed him postcards of Paris. Inspired, and despite not having the legal paperwork to immigrate to France, Benoît begins the long journey to make his way to Paris, by bus and eventually by an illegal boat crossing across the Strait of Gibraltar.

== Cast ==
- Juliette Binoche as Élise
- Romain Duris as Pierre
- Fabrice Luchini as Roland Verneuil
- Albert Dupontel as Jean
- François Cluzet as Philippe Verneuil
- Karin Viard as the bakery manager
- Mélanie Laurent as Laetitia
- Gilles Lellouche as Franky
- Zinedine Soualem as Mourad
- Julie Ferrier as Caroline
- Maurice Bénichou as the psychiatrist
- Olivia Bonamy as Diane
- Audrey Marnay as Marjolaine
- Annelise Hesme as Victoire
- Sabrina Ouazani as Khadija
- Xavier Robic as Arthur Delamare
- Emmanuel Quatra as Grand Nanar
- Kingsley Kum Abang as Benoît
- Joffrey Platel as Rémy
- Hubert Saint-Macary as the cardiologist
- Judith El Zein as Mélanie Verneuil
- Audrey Lamy as young woman with flowers
- Anne Benoît as Suzini
- Joseph Malerba as a taxi driver
- Cédric Klapisch as man on the roof (uncredited)

== Soundtrack ==
Paris: La Bande Originale Du Film de Cédric Klapisch

Soundtrack album by various artists
- Released: 2008
- Label: Warner Music France

The soundtrack for the film featured songs from the film along with the original music credited to Kraked Unit, mostly written by Robert Burke and Loïc Dury. The album charted at number 44 in France.

=== Track listing ===
1. Kraked Unit – "Munivers De Paris"
2. Wax Tailor (featuring Charlotte Savary) – "Seize the Day"
3. Artur Nunes – "Tia"
4. Kraked Unit – "L'air Des Cendres"
5. Rosemary Clooney – "Sway"
6. Quincy Jones – "Comin' Home Baby"
7. Philippe Katerine – "Louxor J'adore"
8. Wilson Pickett – "Land of a Thousand Dances"
9. Grant Phabao pres. Carlton Livingston and the Lone Ranger – "Running for My Life"
10. Kraked Unit – "Douala Paris"
11. Kraked Unit – "I Love Bidoche"
12. Kraked Unit – "Ah Hum Babe"
13. Adrag – "I Don't Give a F..."
14. Kraked Unit – "Les Fleurs Du Slam"
15. Erik Satie – "Gnossienne N°1"

== Reception ==
On the review aggregator website Rotten Tomatoes, the film holds an approval rating of 66% based on 71 reviews, with an average rating of 6.5/10. The website's critics consensus reads, "Alternately a sharp ensemble dramedy and a love letter to the titular city, Paris is uneven but often striking." Metacritic, which uses a weighted average, assigned the film a score of 68 out of 100, based on 21 critics, indicating "generally favorable" reviews.

Stephen Holden of The New York Times called the film a "sumptuous Gallic comedy" with "likable characters" and described it as "[b]oth a Parisian answer to Woody Allen's Manhattan and a multicharacter mosaic in the mode of Robert Altman's Short Cuts". The film won the Radio-Canada Audience Award at the 2009 edition of the Cinéfranco film festival.
