= Cqmd =

CQMD (Ceux Qui Marchent Debout)
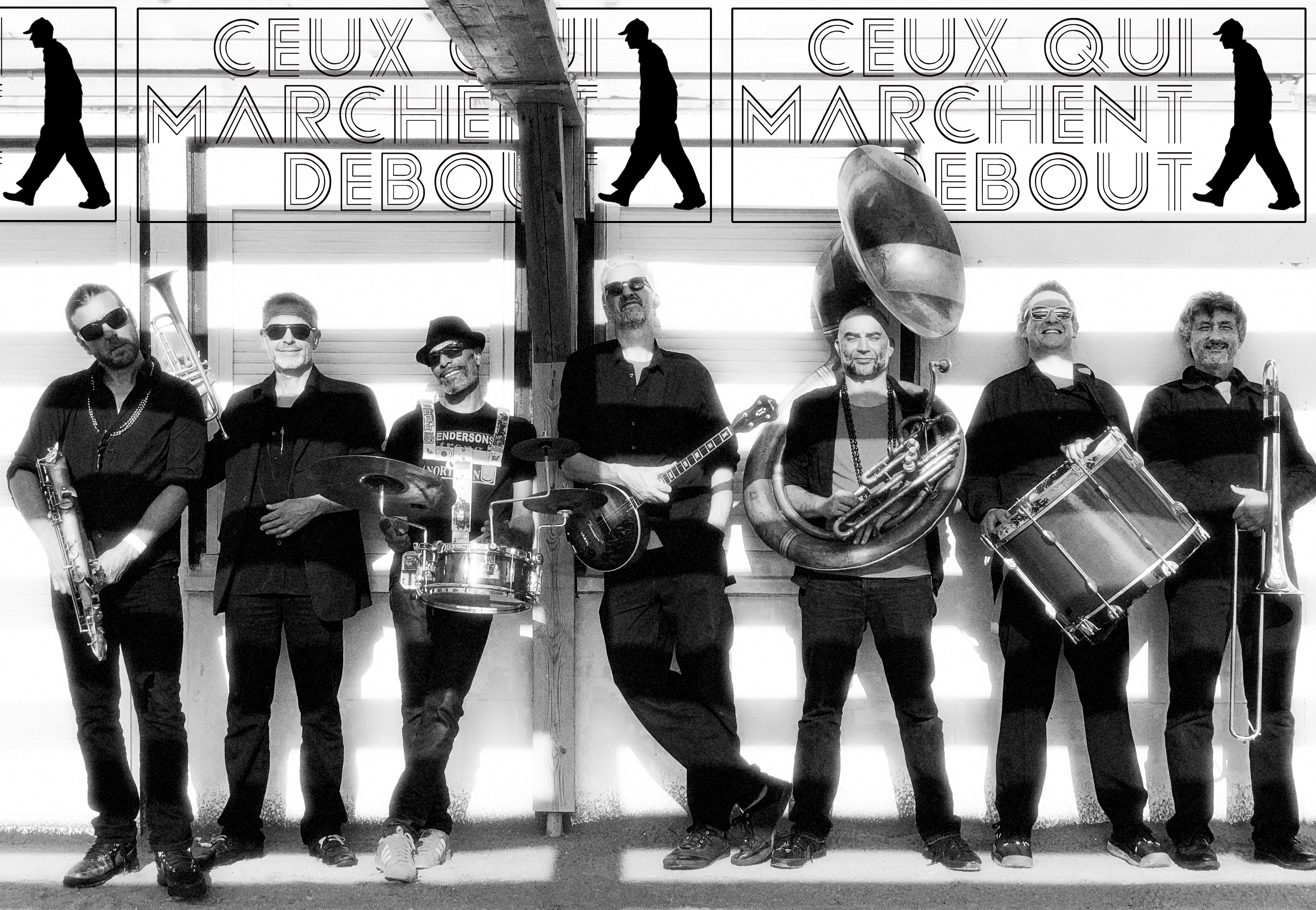

Background information
- Origin: Paris, France.
- Genres: Funk, brass band
- Years active: 1992–present
- Labels: Independent
- Website: cqmd.net

CQMD Is a heavy funk band from France using amplified 1930's brass band instruments. CQMD are the initials for Ceux Qui Marchent Debout and is the band's name outside its national territory.

== Biography ==
Created in 1992 by Superclark, producer of Malka Family and founder of Patate Records, "Bart" and "Androuze", trumpet and trombone player of "La Marabunta", and Roufi, sousaphone player in Boula Matari. The band was originally called Les Fils de Crao playing mostly in alternative venues and bars of the Paris area. Because another band has the same name they switched to "Ceux qui marchent debout", a name that makes direct reference to the comic's character Rahan.

In July 1995, at the Bataclan de Paris, they shared their first big stage with American bass player and singer Bootsy Collins. A few months later, they were asked by French film director Cédric Klapisch to compose the music of his next movie, Chacun cherche son chat ("When The Cat's Away"). The band has played much since, opening or contributing with composers and musicians Fred Wesley, Maceo Parker, The Neville Brothers, Galactic, or David Byrne who featured their song "Horses" on The Cuisine Non-Stop compilation on his label Luaka Bop.

This band, which was briefly signed on the major EMI for its second album, is independent.

== Line up ==
- Bruno Gautheron – trumpet, vocals
- Sylvain "Bart" Lacombe – trombone, vocals
- Arnaud Fioravanti – saxophone
- Julien Petit – sousaphone
- Fabrice Lerigab – snare drum. vocals
- Boris de Loeper – bass drum, percussions, vocals
- Bruno "Superclark" Clark – banjo, vocals

Old members :

- Serge "Roufi" Calka (sousaphone, vocals)
- Cyril "Vitch" Noacco (bass drum, vocals)
- Eric "Tafani" Dubessay (snare drum, vocals)
- Arthur Simon (trumpet)
- Ounsa Mebarkia (vocals)
- Philippe "Androuze" Andrieu (trumpet).

== Discography ==
- Nageant dans le brouillard (1993 – k7 under the name Les Fils de Crao)
- Debout (1996)
- Your Boddy (1998)
- Lalalalalala (2000)
- Funky Stuff in a Reggae Style (2001)
- CQMD (2003)
- DVD Live + Bonus (2005)
- The Jackpot (2007)
- Check That Funk (2008)
- Shoot The Freak (2011) featuring Angelo Moore, Femi Kuti, Yellowman.
- Don't Be Shy (2016) featuring Rosemary Standley.
- From Blues To Funk (2022).
