= César Award for Best Editing =

French film award

- Country: France
- Presented by: Académie des Arts et Techniques du Cinéma
- First award: 1976
- Currently held by: Catherine Schwartz for Nouvelle Vague (2026)
- Website: academie-cinema.org

The César Award for Best Editing (French: César du meilleur montage) is an award presented annually by the Académie des Arts et Techniques du Cinéma since 1976.

== Winners and nominees ==
=== 1970s ===
Year	Winner and nominees	Original title	Editor(s)
1976 (1st)	Seven Deaths by Prescription	7 morts sur ordonnance	Geneviève Winding
1976 (1st)	Call me Savage	Le sauvage	Marie-Josèphe Yoyotte
1976 (1st)	The French Detective	Adieu poulet	Jean Ravel
1976 (1st)	The Important Thing Is To Love	L'important c'est d'aimer	Christiane Lack
1976 (1st)	The Old Gun	Le vieux fusil	Eva Zora
1977 (2nd)	Police Python 357		Marie-Josèphe Yoyotte
1977 (2nd)	Barocco		Claudine Merlin
1977 (2nd)	Mr. Klein	Monsieur Klein	Henri Lanoë
1977 (2nd)	A Woman at Her Window	Une femme à sa fenêtre	Jean Ravel
1978 (3rd)	Providence		Albert Jurgenson
1978 (3rd)	The Base of the Air Is Red	Le fond de l'air est rouge	Chris Marker
1978 (3rd)	The Simple Past	Le passé simple	Françoise Bonnot
1978 (3rd)	The Threat	La menace	Henri Lanoë
1979 (4th)	Dossier 51	Le dossier 51	Raymonde Guyot
1979 (4th)	Butterfly on the Shoulder	Un papillon sur l'épaule	Henri Lanoë
1979 (4th)	Other People's Money	L'argent des autres	Jean Ravel
1979 (4th)	The Savage State	L'état sauvage	Geneviève Winding

=== 1980s ===
Year	Winner and nominees	Original title	Editor(s)
1980 (5th)	Don Giovanni		Reginald Beck
1980 (5th)	The Brontë Sisters	Les Soeurs Brontë	Claudine Merlin
1980 (5th)	Le cavaleur		Henri Lanoë
1980 (5th)	Cold Cuts	Buffet froid	Claudine Merlin
1980 (5th)	Série noire		Thierry Derocles
1981 (6th)	The Last Metro	Le dernier métro	Martine Barraqué-Currie
1981 (6th)	Death Watch	La mort en direct	Michael Ellis and Armand Psenny
1981 (6th)	Umbrella Coup	Le coup du parapluie	Albert Jurgenson
1981 (6th)	The Woman Banker	La banquière	Geneviève Winding
1982 (7th)	Under Suspicion	Garde à vue	Albert Jurgenson
1982 (7th)	Clean Up	Coup de torchon	Armand Psenny
1982 (7th)	Dance of Life	Les uns et les autres	Sophie Bhaud and Hugues Darmois
1982 (7th)	Malevil		Henri Lanoë
1983 (8th)	What Makes David Run?	Qu'est-ce qui fait courir David	Noëlle Boisson
1983 (8th)	The Balance	La balance	Françoise Javet
1983 (8th)	The North Star	L'Étoile du Nord	Jean Ravel
1983 (8th)	The Roaring Forties	Les quarantièmes rugissants	Henri Lanoë
1983 (8th)	Tir groupé		Armand Psenny
1984 (9th)	One Deadly Summer	L'été meurtrier	Jacques Witta
1984 (9th)	Hanna K.		Françoise Bonnot
1984 (9th)	Les mots pour le dire		Claire Pinheiro
1984 (9th)	News Items	Faits divers	Françoise Prenant
1984 (9th)	The Wounded Man	L'homme blessé	Denise de Casabianca
1985 (10th)	My New Partner	Les ripoux	Nicole Saunier
1985 (10th)	Our Story	Notre histoire	Claudine Merlin
1985 (10th)	Souvenirs souvenirs		Geneviève Winding
1985 (10th)	A Sunday in the Country	Un dimanche à la campagne	Armand Psen
1986 (11th)	Death in a French Garden	Péril en la demeure	Raymonde Guyot
1986 (11th)	He Died with His Eyes Open	On ne meurt que 2 fois	Henri Lanoë
1986 (11th)	Police		Yann Dedet
1986 (11th)	Subway		Sophie Schmit
1987 (12th)	Thérèse		Isabelle Dedieu
1987 (12th)	Betty Blue	37°2 le matin	Monique Prim
1987 (12th)	Ménage	Tenue de soirée	Claudine Merlin
1987 (12th)	Round Midnight		Armand Psenny
1988 (13th)	Goodbye, Children	Au revoir les enfants	Emmanuelle Castro
1988 (13th)	The Grand Highway	Le grand chemin	Raymonde Guyot
1988 (13th)	Under the Sun of Satan	Sous le soleil de Satan	Yann Dedet
1989 (14th)	The Bear	L'ours	Noëlle Boisson
1989 (14th)	Camille Claudel		Joëlle Hache and Jeanne Kef
1989 (14th)	The Reader	La lectrice	Raymonde Guyot

=== 1990s ===
Year	Winner and nominees	Original title	Editor(s)
1990 (15th)	Too Beautiful for You	Trop belle pour toi	Claudine Merlin
1990 (15th)	Life and Nothing But	La vie et rien d'autre	Armand Psenny
1990 (15th)	Mr. Hire	Monsieur Hire	Joëlle Hache and Claudine Merlin
1991 (16th)	Cyrano de Bergerac		Noëlle Boisson
1991 (16th)	The Hairdresser's Husband	Le mari de la coiffeuse	Joëlle Hache
1991 (16th)	La Femme Nikita	Nikita	Olivier Mauffroy
1992 (17th)	Delicatessen		Hervé Schneid
1992 (17th)	All the Mornings of the World	Tous les matins du monde	Marie-Josèphe Yoyotte
1992 (17th)	Thank You Life	Merci la vie	Claudine Merlin
1993 (18th)	Savage Nights	Les nuits fauves	Lise Beaulieu
1993 (18th)	Indochine		Geneviève Winding
1993 (18th)	The Lover	L'amant	Noëlle Boisson
1994 (19th)	Three Colors: Blue	Trois couleurs: Bleu	Jacques Witta
1994 (19th)	Germinal		Hervé de Luze
1994 (19th)	Smoking/No Smoking		Albert Jurgenson
1994 (19th)	The Visitors	Les visiteurs	Catherine Kelber
1995 (20th)	See How They Fall	Regarde les hommes tomber	Juliette Welfling
1995 (20th)	Léon		Sylvie Landra
1995 (20th)	Queen Margot	La reine Margot	François Gédigier and Hélène Viard
1996 (21st)	Hate	La haine	Mathieu Kassovitz and Scott Stevenson
1996 (21st)	The Horseman on the Roof	Le hussard sur le toit	Noëlle Boisson
1996 (21st)	Nelly and Mr. Arnaud	Nelly et Monsieur Arnaud	Jacqueline Thiédot
1997 (22nd)	Microcosmos	Microcosmos: Le peuple de l'herbe	Florence Ricard and Marie-Josèphe Yoyotte
1997 (22nd)	Ridicule		Joëlle Hache
1997 (22nd)	A Self Made Hero	Un héros très discret	Juliette Welfling
1998 (23rd)	Same Old Song	On connaît la chanson	Hervé de Luze
1998 (23rd)	The Fifth Element		Sylvie Landra
1998 (23rd)	On Guard	Le bossu	Henri Lanoë
1999 (24th)	Taxi		Véronique Lange
1999 (24th)	Place Vendôme		Luc Barnier and Françoise Bonnot
1999 (24th)	Those Who Love Me Can Take the Train	Ceux qui m'aiment prendront le train	François Gédigier

=== 2000s ===
Year	Winner and nominees	Original title	Editor(s)
2000 (25th)	Tracks	Voyages	Emmanuelle Castro
2000 (25th)	Girl on the Bridge	La fille sur le pont	Joëlle Hache
2000 (25th)	The Messenger: The Story of Joan of Arc		Sylvie Landra
2001 (26th)	Harry, He's Here to Help	Harry, un ami qui vous veut du bien	Yannick Kergoat
2001 (26th)	The Crimson Rivers	Les rivières pourpres	Maryline Monthieux
2001 (26th)	The Taste of Others	Le goût des autres	Hervé de Luze
2002 (27th)	Winged Migration	Le Peuple migrateur	Marie-Josèphe Yoyotte
2002 (27th)	Amélie	Le fabuleux destin d'Amélie Poulain	Hervé Schneid
2002 (27th)	Read My Lips	Sur mes lèvres	Juliette Welfling
2003 (28th)	To Be and to Have	Être et avoir	Nicolas Philibert
2003 (28th)	The Pianist (nominated for the Academy Award)		Hervé de Luze
2003 (28th)	The Spanish Apartment	L'auberge espagnole	Francine Sandberg
2004 (29th)	One: On the Run; Two: An Amazing Couple; Three: After Life	Cavale; Un couple épatant Après la vie	Danielle Anezin, Valérie Loiseleux, Ludo Troch
2004 (29th)	Bon voyage		Maryline Monthieux
2004 (29th)	Not on the Lips	Pas sur la bouche	Hervé de Luze
2005 (30th)	Two Brothers	Deux frères	Noëlle Boisson
2005 (30th)	Département 36	36 Quai des Orfèvres	Hachdé
2005 (30th)	A Very Long Engagement	Un long dimanche de fiançailles	Hervé Schneid
2006 (31st)	The Beat That My Heart Skipped	De battre mon cœur s'est arrêté	Juliette Welfling
2006 (31st)	March of the Penguins	La marche de l'empereur	Sabine Emiliani
2006 (31st)	The Russian Dolls	Les poupées russes	Francine Sandberg
2007 (32nd)	Tell No One	Ne le dis à personne	Hervé de Luze
2007 (32nd)	Days of Glory	Indigènes	Yannick Kergoat
2007 (32nd)	Orchestra Seats	Fauteuils d'orchestre	Sylvie Landra
2007 (32nd)	Private Fears in Public Places	Cœurs	Hervé de Luze
2007 (32nd)	When I Was a Singer	Quand j'étais chanteur	Martine Giordano
2008 (33rd)	The Diving Bell and the Butterfly (nominated for the Academy Award)	Le Scaphandre et le papillon	Juliette Welfling
2008 (33rd)	Persepolis		Stéphane Roche
2008 (33rd)	A Secret	Un secret	Véronique Lange
2008 (33rd)	The Secret of the Grain	La graine et le mulet	Camille Toubkis and Ghalya Lacroix
2008 (33rd)	La Vie en Rose	La môme	Richard Marizy and Yves Beloniak
2009 (34th)	The First Day of the Rest of Your Life	Le Pemier Jour du reste de ta vie	Sophie Reine
2009 (34th)	A Christmas Tale	Un conte de Noël	Laurence Briaud
2009 (34th)	The Class	Entre les murs	Robin Campillo and Stephanie Leger
2009 (34th)	Paris		Francine Sandberg
2009 (34th)	Public Enemy Number One: Part 1 and 2	L'instinct de mort and L'ennemi public n°1	Bill Pankow and Hervé Schneid

=== 2010s ===
Year	Winner and nominees	Original title	Editor(s)
2010 (35th)	A Prophet	Un prophète	Juliette Welfling
2010 (35th)	In the Beginning	À l'origine	Célia Lafitedupont
2010 (35th)	Wild Grass	Les Herbes folles	Hervé de Luze
2010 (35th)	Welcome		Andrea Sedlackova
2010 (35th)	Le Concert		Ludo Troch
2011 (36th)	The Ghost Writer		Hervé de Luze
2011 (36th)	Carlos		Luc Barnier
2011 (36th)	On Tour	Tournée	Annette Dutertre
2011 (36th)	Of Gods and Men	Des hommes et des dieux	Marie-Julie Maille
2011 (36th)	Gainsbourg (Vie héroïque)		Marilyne Monthieux
2012 (37th)	Polisse		Laure Gardette and Yann Dedet
2012 (37th)	The Artist		Anne-Sophie Bion and Michel Hazanavicius
2012 (37th)	The Minister	L'Exercice de l'État	Laurence Briaud
2012 (37th)	Declaration of War	La Guerre est déclarée	Pauline Gaillard
2012 (37th)	The Intouchables	Intouchables	Dorian Rigal-Ansous
2013 (38th)	Rust and Bone	De rouille et d'os	Juliette Welfling
2013 (38th)	Farewell, My Queen	Les Adieux à la reine	Luc Barnier
2013 (38th)	Camille Rewinds	Camille redouble	Annette Dutertre and Michel Klochendler
2013 (38th)	Holy Motors		Nelly Quettier
2013 (38th)	Amour		Monika Willi
2014 (39th)	Me, Myself and Mum	Les Garçons et Guillaume, à table	Valérie Deseine
2014 (39th)	Stranger by the Lake	L'Inconnu du lac	Jean-Christophe Hym
2014 (39th)	Blue Is the Warmest Colour	La Vie d'Adèle – Chapitres 1 & 2	Albertine Lastera, Jean-Marie Lengellé and Camille Toubkis
2014 (39th)	9 Month Stretch	Neuf mois ferme	Christophe Pinel
2014 (39th)	The Past	Le Passé	Juliette Welfling
2015 (40th)	Timbuktu		Nadia Ben Rachid
2015 (40th)	Love at First Fight	Les Combattants	Lilian Corbeille
2015 (40th)	Hippocrates	Hippocrate	Christel Dewynter
2015 (40th)	Party Girl		Frédéric Baillehaiche
2015 (40th)	Saint Laurent		Fabrice Rouaud
2016 (41st)	Mustang		Mathilde Van de Moortel
2016 (41st)	Dheepan		Juliette Welfling
2016 (41st)	Marguerite		Cyril Nakache
2016 (41st)	Mon roi		Simon Jacquet
2016 (41st)	My Golden Days	Trois souvenirs de ma jeunesse	Laurence Briaud
2017 (42nd)	It's Only the End of the World	Juste la fin du monde	Xavier Dolan
2017 (42nd)	Divines		Loïc Lallemand and Vincent Tricon
2017 (42nd)	Elle		Job ter Burg
2017 (42nd)	Frantz		Laure Gardette
2017 (42nd)	From the Land of the Moon	Mal de pierres	Simon Jacquet
2018 (43rd)	BPM (Beats per Minute)	120 battements par minute	Robin Campillo
2018 (43rd)	See You Up There	Au revoir là-haut	Christophe Pinel
2018 (43rd)	Barbara		François Gédigier
2018 (43rd)	Bloody Milk	Petit Paysan	Julie Lena, Lilian Corbeille & Grégoire Pontécaille
2018 (43rd)	C'est la vie!	Le Sens de la fête	Dorian Rigal-Ansous
2019 (44th)	Custody	Jusqu'à la garde	Yorgos Lamprinos
2019 (44th)	The Trouble with You	En liberté!	Isabelle Devinck
2019 (44th)	The Sisters Brothers	Les Frères Sisters	Juliette Welfling
2019 (44th)	Little Tickles	Les Chatouilles	Valérie Deseine
2019 (44th)	Sink or Swim	Le Grand Bain	Simon Jacquet

=== 2020s ===
Year	Winner and nominees	Original title	Editor(s)
2020 (45th)	Les Misérables		Flora Volpelière
2020 (45th)	By the Grace of God	Grâce à Dieu	Laure Gardette
2020 (45th)	An Officer and a Spy	J'accuse	Hervé de Luze
2020 (45th)	La Belle Époque		Anny Danché and Florent Vassault
2020 (45th)	The Specials	Hors normes	Dorian Rigal-Ansou
2021 (46th)	Adolescents	Adolescentes	Tina Baz
2021 (46th)	Bye Bye Morons	Adieu les cons	Christophe Pinel
2021 (46th)	My Donkey, My Lover & I	Antoinette dans les Cévennes	Annette Dutertre
2021 (46th)	Love Affair(s)	Les Choses qu'on dit, les choses qu'on fait	Marital Salomon
2021 (46th)	Summer of 85	Été 85	Laure Gardette
2022 (47th)	Annette		Nelly Quettier
2022 (47th)	BAC Nord		Simon Jacquet
2022 (47th)	Black Box	Boîte noire	Valentin Féron
2022 (47th)	The Divide	La Fracture	Frédéric Baillehaiche
2022 (47th)	Lost Illusions	Illusions perdues	Cyril Nakache
2023 (48th)	Full Time	À plein temps	Mathilde Van de Moortel
2023 (48th)	Rise	En corps	Anne-Sophie Bion
2023 (48th)	The Innocent	L'Innocent	Pierre Deschamps
2023 (48th)	November	Novembre	Laure Gardette
2023 (48th)	The Night of the 12th	La Nuit du 12	Laurent Rouan
2024 (49th)	Anatomy of a Fall (nominated for the Academy Award)	Anatomie d'une chute	Laurent Sénéchal
2024 (49th)	All Your Faces	Je verrai toujours vos visages	Francis Vesin
2024 (49th)	The Animal Kingdom	Le Règne animal	Lilian Corbeille
2024 (49th)	The Goldman Case	Le Procès Goldman	Yann Dedet
2024 (49th)	Little Girl Blue		Valerie Loiseleux
2025 (50th)	Souleymane's Story	L'Histoire de Souleymane	Xavier Sirven
2025 (50th)	Beating Hearts	L'Amour ouf	Simon Jacquet
2025 (50th)	The Count of Monte Cristo	Le Comte de Monte-Cristo	Célia Lafitedupont
2025 (50th)	Emilia Pérez (nominated for the Academy Award)		Juliette Welfling
2025 (50th)	The Marching Band	En Fanfare	Guerric Catala
2026 (51st)	Nouvelle Vague		Catherine Schwartz
2026 (51st)	13 Days, 13 Nights	13 jours, 13 nuits	Stan Collet
2026 (51st)	Case 137	Dossier 137	Laurent Rouan
2026 (51st)	The Little Sister	La Petite Dernière	Géraldine Mangenot
2026 (51st)	The Ties That Bind Us	L'Attachement	Christel Dewynter

== See also ==
- Academy Award for Best Editing
- BAFTA Award for Best Editing
- European Film Award for Best Editor
- Magritte Award for Best Editing
