= Jill Winternitz =

American actress

- Born: 1986/1987; Davis, California, U.S.
- Citizenship: American; British
- Education: RADA
- Years active: 2011–present
- Spouse: Mike Doxford

Jill Winternitz (born 1986/1987) is an American actress. She is best known for her work on the London stage.

== Early life ==
Winternitz is from Davis, Northern California. Her mother is an academic, and her father is an orthopedic surgeon. Her sister Jana is a producer.

Winternitz attended Davis Senior High School. She began her studies at UCLA, but dropped out. Wanting to study classical theatre, at 19, Winternitz auditioned for the Royal Academy of Dramatic Art (RADA) in London, going on to graduate in 2009 with a Bachelor of Arts in Acting. She also trained at the Interlochen Center for the Arts and Moscow Art Theatre School.

== Career ==
In 2012, Winternitz starred as Frances "Baby" Houseman on a 23-show tour around the United Kingdom of the stage adaptation of Dirty Dancing. She would reprise her role as Baby for the 2013 London run at the Piccadilly Theatre, marking her West End debut.

From 2014 to the show's closure in 2015, Winternitz took over the lead role of Girl from Zrinka Cvitešić in West End production of the Irish musical Once at the Phoenix Theatre, first opposite David Hunter and then Ronan Keating as Guy. Winternitz made her television debut guest starring as Lisa in the Doctor Who series 9 episode "The Zygon Invasion". She also appeared in Dark Tourism at the Park Theatre, for which she was nominated for an Offie.

Winternitz made her feature film debut with a small role in the 2016 comedy A Street Cat Named Bob. In 2017, she starred opposite Adrian Lukis in the UK premiere of Halley Feiffer's I'm Gonna Pray For You So Hard at the Finborough Theatre, for which she was once again nominated for an Offie. She had her first prominent film role in the 2018 thriller film 10x10 with Luke Evans and Kelly Reilly.

Winternitz returned to television when she had a recurring role as Harriet Dowling the 2019 Amazon Prime series Good Omens. She then portrayed Yulia Skripal in the 2020 BBC One drama The Salisbury Poisonings. In 2023, Winternitz played the Good Doctor in the 2022 Netflix series The Sandman, also a Neil Gaiman adaptation. She returned to the Finborough Theatre for The Retreat in 2023.

== Personal life ==
Winternitz is married to English filmmaker Mike Doxford. She holds dual American and British citizenship. As of 2014, she lived in Putney, South West London.

== Filmography ==
Key
†	Denotes films that have not yet been released

=== Film ===
Year	Title	Role	Notes
2016	A Street Cat Named Bob	Wife	
2018	10x10	Jen	
2022	Non-Negotiable	Kat	Short film
2023	Indiana Jones and the Dial of Destiny	Stewardess	
2024	One More Shot	Kelly Harris	
2025	Havoc	Angela	Netflix film
2025	LifeHack	Rachel	
2026	The Leader	Joy	
TBA	Young Gun †	Birdie	In production

=== Television ===
Year	Title	Role	Notes
2007	The Replacement Child	Lauren Murphy	Short film
2011	Strays	Smiling Girl	Short film
2015	Doctor Who	Lisa	Episode: "The Zygon Invasion"
2019	Good Omens	Harriet Dowling	2 episodes
2020	The Salisbury Poisonings	Yulia Skripal	Miniseries
2020	Hanna	Rachel	Episode: "You're With Us Now"
2022	Suspicion	Mother	Episode: "Persons of Interest"
2022	The Sandman	The Good Doctor	3 episodes
2024	Anansi Boys	Melissa	

== Stage ==
Year	Title	Role	Notes
2012	A Handful of Soil	Kiki	Drayton Arms, London
2012–2013	Dirty Dancing	Frances "Baby" Houseman	Piccadilly Theatre, London / UK tour
2014–2015	Once	Girl	Phoenix Theatre, London
2015	Dark Tourism	Jennifer Chapman	Park Theatre, London
2017	I'm Gonna Pray For You So Hard	Ella	Finborough Theatre, London
2023	The Retreat	Rachel Benjamin	Finborough Theatre, London

== Awards and nominations ==
Year	Award	Category	Work	Result	Ref.
2015	Offie	Best Actress in a Play	Dark Tourism	Nominated	
2017	Offie	Best Actress in a Play	I'm Gonna Pray For You So Hard	Nominated	
