= Golden Eighties =

1986 film by Chantal Akerman

- French theatrical release poster
- Directed by: Chantal Akerman
- Written by: Pascal Bonitzer; Henry Bean; Chantal Akerman; Jean Gruault; Leora Barish
- Produced by: Martine Merignac
- Starring: Delphine Seyrig; Myriam Boyer; Fanny Cottençon; Lio; Pascale Salkin; Charles Denner; Jean-François Balmer; John Berry; Nicolas Tronc
- Cinematography: Gilberto Azevedo
- Edited by: Francine Sandberg
- Music by: Marc Hérouet
- Production companies: La Cecilia; Paradise Films; Limbo Film
- Distributed by: Pari Films; Gerick Distribution
- Release dates: 15 May 1986 (Cannes); 25 June 1986 (France)
- Running time: 96 minutes
- Countries: Belgium; France; Switzerland
- Language: French

Golden Eighties (also known as Window Shopping) is a 1986 musical comedy film co-written and directed by Chantal Akerman. The film explores themes such as consumerism, feminism, and Jewish identity through the lens of a shopping mall.

== Plot ==
The film follows the romantic lives of an ensemble of retail employees at a shopping mall. Sylvie, a coffee shop employee, pines for her boyfriend who has traveled to Labrador seeking fortune. Her customer Eli, an American man, reencounters Jeanne, a Jewish woman from Poland who had been his lover in the wake of World War II when he was stationed in France. He pursues her in an attempt to start a new life with her, but ultimately, Jeanne cannot bring herself to leave the life she built with her shopkeeper husband and her son Robert.

Meanwhile, Pascale, a hairdresser, pines for Robert despite his love for the salon's manager Lili. Robert is rejected by Lili for Monsieur Jean, the wealthy married man who owns the salon. Robert instead resolves to marry hairdresser Mado, but is caught in a final tryst with Lili by Pascale. Word of Robert's infidelity spreads to everybody but Mado. When the news reaches Monsieur Schwartz, he tries to leverage it to make Monsieur Jean sell Lili's salon to him so he can expand his shop. Enraged, Monsieur Jean violently confronts Lili in the salon. Eli and Lili leave the mall together.

Three months later, Robert now runs a boutique in the space formerly occupied by the salon and is set to marry Mado. On the eve of the wedding, Lili returns to the mall to proclaim her love for Robert. Mado catches the pair kissing in a fitting room and is distraught, running to Jeanne for comfort. Jeanne consoles Mado by telling her that she and Robert would not have been happy together and invites her to dinner with herself and her husband. As they leave the mall, they run into Eli and his new wife.

== Cast ==
- Delphine Seyrig as Jeanne Schwartz
- Myriam Boyer as Sylvie
- Fanny Cottençon as Lili
- Lio as Mado
- Pascale Salkin as Pascale
- Charles Denner as Monsieur Schwartz
- Jean-François Balmer as Monsieur Jean
- John Berry as Eli
- Nicolas Tronc as Robert Schwartz

== Production ==
Akerman conceived Golden Eighties in the style of a Technicolor MGM musical. Because this was a departure from her earlier work, she initially struggled to secure funding. In 1983, she released a documentary showcasing the movie's early production stages to attract investors. The first hour of the documentary, titled Les Années 80, featured rehearsal scenes. The documentary continued with an abbreviated version of the musical, followed by Akerman thanking her collaborators in a 360-degree pan of Brussels. It concluded with the phrase "Next year in Jerusalem".

Although Les Années 80 was poorly received at the 1983 New York Film Festival, Akerman eventually secured financing. Filming took place in Brussels over eight weeks in 1985. Budget constraints resulted in a more modest production; for example, choreography was simpler than originally envisioned.

== Release ==
Golden Eighties premiered at the 1986 Directors' Fortnight, a parallel section of the Cannes Film Festival. The film received a limited release in the United States on 17 April 1992 under the title Window Shopping to avoid confusion with Les Années 80, the musical's making-of documentary, which was released as Golden Eighties in the United States.

== Reception ==
Golden Eighties enjoyed modest success in Belgium and France. In a 1992 review for The New York Times, critic Vincent Canby called it "an unpretentious, absolutely charming romantic comedy-with-music, the small scale of which perfectly suits the passions of its characters".
