= Them (2006 film) =

French horror film

- Original French poster
- Directed by: David Moreau; Xavier Palud
- Written by: David Moreau; Xavier Palud
- Produced by: Richard Grandpierre
- Starring: Olivia Bonamy; Michaël Cohen
- Cinematography: Axel Cosnefroy
- Edited by: Nicolas Sarkissian
- Music by: René-Marc Bini
- Distributed by: Mars Distribution
- Release date: July 19, 2006
- Running time: 74 minutes
- Countries: France; Romania
- Languages: French; Romanian
- Budget: €1.84 million ($2.35 million)
- Box office: $2.73 million

Them (French: Ils) is a 2006 French-Romanian horror film directed by David Moreau and Xavier Palud. According to a title card at the beginning of the film, it is "based on real events".

Olivia Bonamy plays Clementine, a young teacher who has recently moved from France to a remote but idyllic country house near Bucharest, Romania, with her lover Lucas played by Michaël Cohen. Their peaceful life turns into a fight for survival when they are attacked by mysterious assailants.

== Plot ==
A mother and daughter drive along a deserted country road at night while having an argument and crash their vehicle. The mother goes out of the car to check the engine but disappears. The daughter calls out for her but her call is repeated from the woods by a soft whispering voice. The daughter attempts to call the police but is strangled to death.

The next day, Clémentine passes the crashed vehicle. That night, she is awakened by music outside. She investigates with her boyfriend Lucas and see that their car has been moved away from the house. As Lucas approaches it, the car is driven off. Lucas then finds the TV on and the tap running. He swings a poker at an intruder and shatters the door glass, his leg getting impaled by a large shard in the process. He and Clémentine lock themselves in the upstairs bathroom. Clémentine climbs into the attic to find an escape route. One of the intruders grabs her but she pushes him off a balcony. The couple flee from the house, locking the second intruder inside.

The pair limp into the woods only to encounter a fence. Due to his injury, Lucas cannot climb over it. He hides in the bushes as Clémentine heads for help. She sees the light from two flashlights and realises the intruders are catching up to her. She finds her car but is confronted by the intruders. Lucas hears Clémentine's screams and finds the car. He kills one of the attackers and discovers it is a teenage boy. He follows her screams and finds a manhole. In the sewers, Clémentine is being tortured by another teenager while a younger boy sits nearby, telling the torturer to stop. Lucas kills the teenager and with the younger boy's help, the two escape through the sewer system. The boy then turns on them and Clémentine watches in horror as Lucas is dragged away. As she is about to kill the boy, he asks, "Why won't you play with us?" Clémentine is also dragged off.

The film ends with a group of hooded children emerging from the woods and running for a bus. All the children are male, with the exception of just one girl. On-screen text explains that the bodies of Clémentine and Lucas were found five days later and that the murderers were children aged 10–15. Upon interrogation, the youngest of the group explained that night's events as "They wouldn't play with us."

== Cast ==
- Olivia Bonamy as Clémentine
- Michaël Cohen as Lucas
- Adriana Mocca as Ilona
- Maria Roman as Sanda
- Camelia Maxim as Maria

== Production ==
The film has been advertised as being "based on real events". The "true story" on which the film is supposedly based is that of an Austrian couple who were murdered by three teenagers while vacationing in the Czech Republic, but no concrete evidence has emerged to prove this tale.

The film was shot in 30 days. According to Moreau, Olivia Bonamy had suffered from claustrophobia, and so during the scene where her character Clémentine crawls through the narrow tunnels, much of her performance was her genuine fear of being in the tight spaces.

== Reception ==
On the review aggregator website Rotten Tomatoes, 63% of 51 critics' reviews are positive, with an average rating of 6.1/10. The website's consensus reads: "Suspenseful and tense from start to finish, the French horror film Them proves that a lack of gore doesn't mean a dearth of scares."

== See also ==
- List of films featuring home invasions
