= The Milk of Human Kindness (film) =

2001 film by Dominique Cabrera

- Film poster
- Directed by: Dominique Cabrera
- Written by: Dominique Cabrera; Gilles Marchand; Cécile Vargaftig
- Produced by: Philippe Martin; Dardenne brothers Olivier Bronckart; David Thion; Arlette Zylberberg
- Starring: Patrick Bruel; Marilyne Canto
- Cinematography: Hélène Louvart
- Edited by: Francine Sandberg
- Music by: Béatrice Thiriet
- Production companies: Canal+ Les Films du Fleuve
- Distributed by: Rézo Films
- Release dates: 7 August 2001 (Locarno); 19 September 2001 (France)
- Running time: 94 minutes
- Countries: France; Belgium
- Language: French
- Budget: $3 million
- Box office: $500.000

The Milk of Human Kindness (original title: Le Lait de la tendresse humaine) is a 2001 French-Belgium drama film directed by Dominique Cabrera.

== Plot ==
Christelle, a mother, disappears without a trace.

== Cast ==
- Patrick Bruel as Laurent
- Marilyne Canto as Christelle
- Dominique Blanc as Claire
- Sergi López as Serge
- Claude Brasseur as Jean-Claude
- Mathilde Seigner as Josiane
- Valeria Bruni Tedeschi as Josiane
- Yolande Moreau as Babette
- Olivier Gourmet as Doctor Gérard Cafarelli
- Jacques Boudet as Jean-François
- Marthe Villalonga as Marthe
- Antoine Chappey as Guy-Michel
- Bruno Salvador as Rémi
- Antoine Bonnaire as Cédric
- Nour Gana as Cendrine
- Léna Breban as Sonia
- Edmée Doroszlai as Véronique

== Accolades ==
| Award | Category | Recipient | Result |
|---|---|---|---|
| Chicago International Film Festival | Best Feature | Dominique Cabrera | Nominated |
| Locarno International Film Festival | Special Mention | Ensemble Cast | Won |
| Locarno International Film Festival | Golden Leopard | Dominique Cabrera | Nominated |
