= Raymond Jean =

French writer

Raymond Jean (French pronunciation: [ʁɛmɔ̃ ʒɑ̃]; 21 November 1925, Marseille – 3 April 2012, Gargas in the Vaucluse department) was a prolific French writer. He published more than 40 books in many genres, and won the Prix Goncourt de la nouvelle in 1983 for his book Un fantasme de Bella B. His novella La lectrice was turned into a hit film by director Michel Deville, starring Miou-Miou. It has been translated in English by Adriana Hunter for publication by Peirene Press, under the title Reader for Hire.

== Bibliography ==
- 1953: Le Bois vert, Seghers
- 1959: Les Ruines de New York, Albin Michel
- 1961: La Conférence, Albin Michel
- 1963: Les Grilles, Albin Michel
- 1964: Nerval, Seuil
- 1965: La littérature et le réel : de Diderot au "Nouveau roman", Albin Michel
- 1966: Le Village, Albin Michel
- 1966: Eluard, Seuil
- 1968: La Vive, Seuil
- 1971: Pour Gabrielle, Seuil
- 1971: Les Deux Printemps, Seuil
- 1971: La Ligne 12, Seuil
- 1974: La Femme attentive, Seuil
- 1975: La Poétique du désir, Seuil
- 1976: La Fontaine obscure, Seuil
- 1976: Pratique de la littérature, Seuil
- 1978: La Rivière nue, Seuil
- 1979: La Singularité d'être communiste, Seuil
- 1980: Photo souvenir, Seuil
- 1982: L., Seuil
- 1982: Choses parlées, with Eugène Guillevic, Champ Vallon
- 1983: Un fantasme de Bella B., Actes Sud
- 1983: L'Or et la Soie, Seuil
- 1984: Les Lunettes, Éditions Gallimard
- 1984: Jean Tortel, Seghers
- 1985: Belle clarté, chère raison, Desclée de Brouwer
- 1986: Cézanne, la vie, l'espace, Seuil
- 1986: La Lectrice, Actes Sud, (adapted in film in 1987 under the title The Reader by Michel Deville, with Miou-Miou )
- 1988: Transports, Actes Sud
- 1989: La Dernière Nuit d'André Chénier, Albin Michel
- 1999: Les Perplexités du juge Douglas, Actes Sud
- 1999: Le Roi de l'ordure, Actes Sud
- 2000: Tutoiements, Arléa
- 2000: Un portrait de Sade, Actes Sud
- 2002: La Terre est bleue, Renaissance du livre
- 2002: Clotilde ou le second procès de Baudelaire, Actes Sud
- 2009: La leçon d'écriture, nouvelles, L'aube, 2009
- 2011: Légère et court vêtue ou Lubie en Luberon, Éditions du Luberon, his last work
