= Olivia Bonamy =

French actress (born 1972)

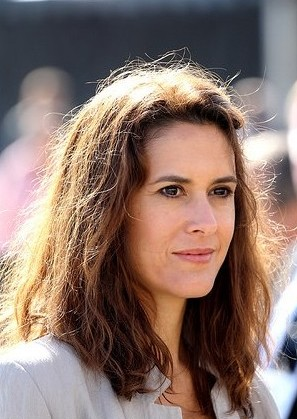
- Olivia Bonamy in 2016
- Born: 21 September 1972 (age 53); Saint-Cloud, France
- Occupation: Actress
- Years active: 1993–present
- Partner: Romain Duris
- Children: 2

Olivia Bonamy (born 21 September 1972) is a French actress. She is best known for her appearances in the films Jefferson in Paris, Jacques Audiard's Read My Lips, the thriller Ils and Le ciel, les oiseaux et ta mère.

== Biography ==
She studied art history at university and then took a course in theatre.

Her box office success occurred in the mid-1990s, but she is mostly unknown outside France.

She has two sons, Luigi, one born on 10 February 2009, and another one born in 2013, with French actor Romain Duris.

== Filmography ==
- Le Petit garçon (1995) – Juliette
- Jefferson in Paris (1995) – Schoolgirl
- Sen de Gitme (1995) – Triyandfilis
- L'Échappée belle (1996) – Chloé
- Le Ciel, les oiseaux,... et ta mère! (1999) (English title: Boys on the Beach) – Lydie
- Voyous voyelles (1999) (English title : Pretty devils) – Léa
- Une pour toutes (1999) (English title: One 4 All) – Olivia Colbert
- La Captive (2000) (English title: The Captive) – Andrée
- Mortels (2000, Short) – La soeur
- Sur mes lèvres (2001) (English title: Read My Lips) – Annie
- Heureuse (2001, Short) – La virtuelle de 28 kg
- Filles perdues, cheveux gras (2002) (English title: Hypnotized and Hysterical) – Élodie
- Bloody Mallory (2002) – Mallory
- Pierre, Paul ou Jacques (2003, Short) – Marie
- Mariage mixte (2004) – Lisa Zagury
- Célibataires (2006) – Nelly
- Ils (2006) – Clémentine
- L'âge d'homme... maintenant ou jamais! (2007)
- Paris (2008) – Diane
- MR 73 (2008) – Justine Maxence
- La guerre des miss (2008) – Cécile
- Une folle envie (2011) – Rose Abadi
- Chez nous c'est trois! (2013) – L'actrice de Baisers fanés
- De plus belle (2017) – Manon

=== Television ===
- Des enfants dans les arbres (1994, TV Movie) – Nora
- Ils n'ont pas 20 ans (1995, TV Movie) – Véronique
- Ange Espérandieu (1995, TV Movie) – Fanny
- Les Filles du maître de chai (1997, TV Movie) – Juliette
- Elle a l'âge de ma fille (1998, TV Movie) – Eugénie
- Un père en plus (1998, TV Movie) – Julie
- Le Chant de l'homme mort (1998, TV Movie) – Nadia
- Une leçon d'amour (1998, TV Movie) – Vanessa
- Vertige (2000) – Agathe Rioult
- Colomba (2005, TV Movie, adaptation of Prosper Mérimée's famous novel) – Colomba
