= London School of Musical Theatre =

Performing arts school in London, England

Coordinates: 51.4989°N 0.0991°W

- Type: Drama school
- Established: 1995
- Principal: Adrian Jeckells
- Location: London, England
- Website: www.lsmt.co.uk

London School of Musical Theatre (LSMT) is a training academy of performing arts, that was founded by Glenn Lee in 1995. The school is located on Borough Road, central London.

It was originally housed at The Old Vic, then His Majesty's Theatre, before moving to premises on Borough Road, where it currently operates.

The school offers a one-year, full-time, vocational training for adults wishing to pursue a career in musical theatre. The ethos of LSMT is to create the environment of a professional company in rehearsal rather than that of an educational institution. The emphasis of the course is on the development of the singing voice as the tool for acting through song alongside a thorough training in dance and drama. Classes are taught by professionals and practitioners working in the industry, with direct experience of the requirements of musical theatre.

Since its inception in 1995, the organisation has commissioned new musical theatre productions, many of which have now been published and performed around the world. The school employs Charles Miller as composer-in-residence.

== Notable alumni ==
- Olivia Chenery
- Holly-Anne Hull
- Hannah Lowther
- Luke Newton
- Nancy Sullivan
- Danny Walters
