= 10x10 (film) =

British psychological thriller film

- Theatrical release poster
- Directed by: Suzi Ewing
- Written by: Noel Clarke
- Produced by: Noel Clarke; Jason Maza; Maggie Monteith
- Starring: Kelly Reilly; Luke Evans; Olivia Chenery
- Cinematography: Aaron Reid
- Edited by: Ian Davies
- Music by: Christopher Holmes
- Production companies: Unstoppable Entertainment; Head Gear Films; Metrol Technology; Broadlane Films; Dignity Film Finance
- Distributed by: Vertical Entertainment (United States); Universal Pictures (United Kingdom)
- Release dates: 13 April 2018 (United States); 27 August 2018 (United Kingdom)
- Running time: 88 minutes
- Countries: United Kingdom; United States
- Language: English
- Box office: $68,260

10x10 is a 2018 psychological thriller film directed by Suzi Ewing. The film stars Luke Evans and Kelly Reilly. It was written and produced by Noel Clarke, through his production company Unstoppable Entertainment.

== Premise ==
The plot revolves around Lewis, a seemingly ordinary man who kidnaps a woman named Cathy. Lewis holds Cathy captive in a soundproof 10×10-foot room in his home, and the reasons behind his actions are gradually revealed as the story unfolds.

Cathy, however, is not an easy victim. Despite being confined, she fights back against her captor, turning the tables on Lewis. As the tension escalates, the film explores the psychological and physical struggle between the captor and captive, unraveling the mystery behind Lewis' motivations and Cathy's resilience. The narrative takes unexpected turns, keeping viewers on edge as they discover the truth about the characters and the reasons for their harrowing ordeal.

== Cast ==
- Luke Evans as Robert Lewis
- Kelly Reilly as Cathy Noland / Natalie-Ann Stevens
- Noel Clarke as Dennis
- Olivia Chenery as Alana Lewis
- Skye Lucia Degruttola as Summer Lewis
- Jill Winternitz as Jen
- Jason Maza as Officer Wayland
- Stacey Hall as Officer Grey
- Norma Dixit as Alondra

== Production ==
The film was shot at West London Film Studios, London, and in Atlanta, Georgia.

== Reception ==
The film has generally received positive reviews from critics with 67% on Rotten Tomatoes. Noel Murray of the Los Angeles Times praised the performances and twists, but questioned some storytelling choices.

On July 4, 2023, the film was the number 1 watched movie on Netflix in the UK.
