= Laurent Levesque =

French film score composer

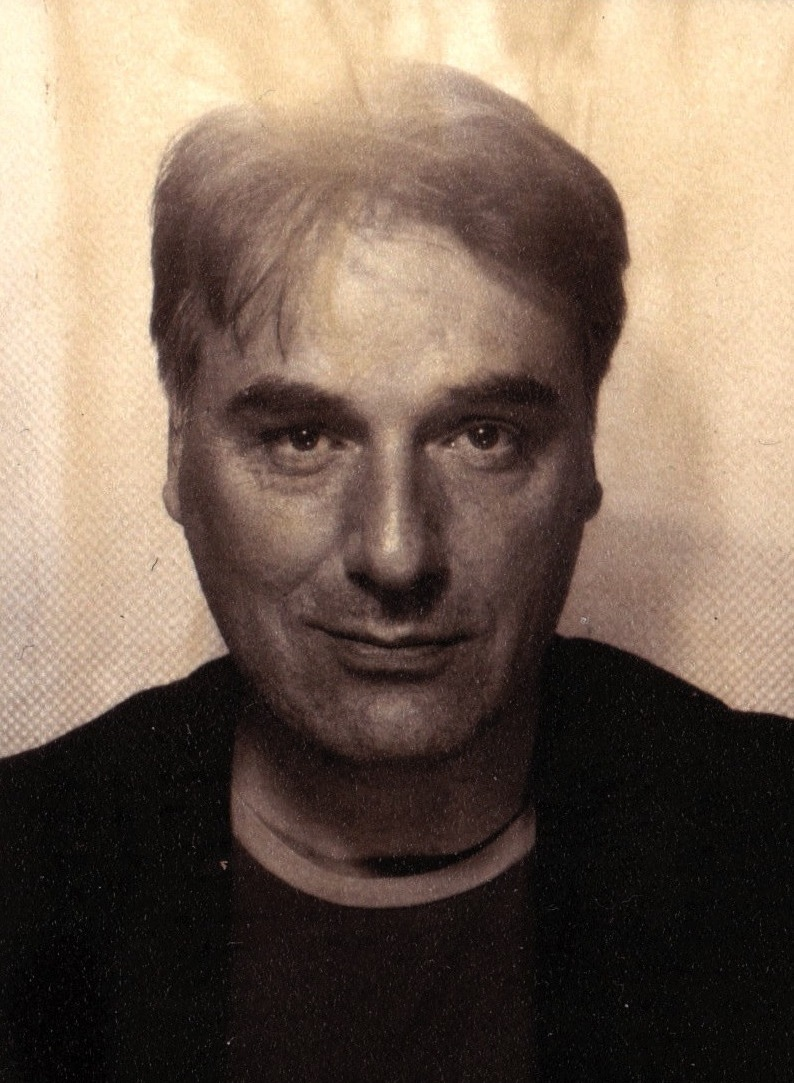

Background information
- Born: Laurent Denis Levesque; 28 January 1970 (age 56); Lyon, France
- Occupations: Composer, orchestrator, conductor
- Website: laurentlevesque.com

Laurent Levesque (born 28 January 1970) is a film score composer. He started the piano at 4 and graduated at 17 from the French national music school academy with five first prizes.

He then became a pianist in several symphonic orchestras and an accompanist at the Opéra National de Lyon.

When he went to perform in New York, he met Philip Glass who introduced him to film music scoring. His first experience in composition for a movie was with the director Costa-Gavras in 2001 for his controversial movie Amen. He swiftly became skilled, both as a performer and a composer, and has since composed more than 40 soundtracks for such directors as Cédric Klapisch and Agnès Varda.
