= Olivia Chenery =

English actress

- Born: Olivia Jane Chenery; 11 March 1989 (age 37); Croydon, London, England
- Education: London School of Musical Theatre
- Years active: 2008–present
- Spouse: Chris Grierson (m. 2019)

Olivia Jane Grierson (née Chenery; born 11 March 1989) is an English actress and environmental advocate. Her films include Brotherhood (2016) and 10x10 (2018). On television, she is known for her roles in the BBC series Queens: The Virgin and the Martyr (2017) and the Sky One series Bulletproof (2020–2021).

== Early life ==
Chenery was born in the South London Borough of Croydon to parents Carolyn and Julian. She has two sisters. She joined the National Youth Theatre and went on to study at the London School of Musical Theatre, graduating in 2010.

== Career ==
Chenery made her television debut as a Plantagenet Princess in the 2013 HBO and BBC Two comedy Family Tree and her feature film debut as Sandy in the 2014 science fiction thriller The Anomaly. This was followed in 2015 by roles in the film Legacy and as a witch in the second season of the Showtime and Sky Atlantic horror series Penny Dreadful.

Chenery had lead roles in the 2016 and 2018 films Brotherhood as Sariya and 10x10 as Alana Lewis, respectively. In 2017, she starred as Mary, Queen of Scots in the British-Spanish historical drama Queens: The Virgin and the Martyr, made for Televisión Española and the BBC.

In 2020, Chenery joined the main cast of the Sky One police procedural Bulletproof for its second series as Scarlett "Scooch" Hailton. She had a recurring role as Holly in the 2021 Netflix science fiction series The One.

Chenery appeared in the 2022 and 2023 films Prizefighter: The Life of Jem Belcher and Jericho Ridge. In the 2023 local elections, Chenery (under her married name Olivia Grierson) unsuccessfully stood to represent Oxted South for the Green Party on Tandridge District Council.

== Personal life ==
Chenery married fellow actor Chris Grierson in July 2019.

== Filmography ==
=== Film ===
Year	Title	Role	Notes
2014	The Anomaly	Sandy	
2015	Legacy	Yasmin	
2016	Brotherhood	Sariya	
2018	10x10	Alana Lewis	
2022	Prizefighter: The Life of Jem Belcher	Lady Abigail	
2023	Jericho Ridge	Dakota	
2024	Dirty Boy	Dr Cronin	
2026	Ghost Soldier †	TBA	

=== Television ===
Year	Title	Role	Notes
2013	Family Tree	Princess	2 episodes
2015	The Interceptor	Witness	1 episode
2015	Penny Dreadful	Witch 2	9 episodes (season 2)
2016	Beowulf: Return to the Shieldlands	Mara	1 episode
2017	Queens: The Virgin and the Martyr	Mary Stuart	Main role
2019	Silent Witness	Beth Roscoe	2 episodes
2019	Endeavour	Isla Fairford	Episode: "Confection"
2020–2021	Bulletproof	Scarlett "Scooch" Hailton	Main role (series 2–3)
2021	The One	Holly	4 episodes
2024	House of the Dragon		
TBA	Brassic		Series 6
