= The Reader (1988 film) =

- French poster
- Directed by: Michel Deville
- Screenplay by: Michel Deville; Rosalinde Deville
- Based on: La Lectrice by Raymond Jean
- Produced by: Rosalinde Deville
- Starring: Miou-Miou; Régis Royer; María Casares; Patrick Chesnais; Marianne Denicourt
- Cinematography: Dominique Le Rigoleur
- Edited by: Raymonde Guyot
- Music by: Ludwig van Beethoven
- Distributed by: Acteurs Auteurs Associés
- Release date: 17 August 1988
- Running time: 97 minutes
- Country: France
- Language: French

The Reader (French: La Lectrice) is a 1988 French film directed by Michel Deville. The film won that year's Louis Delluc Prize, and was nominated for nine César Awards including Best Supporting Actor, won by Patrick Chesnais.

== Plot ==
Constance is a young French woman dissatisfied with her mundane life but has a talent for reading stories to others. As the movie opens, she reads a book called La Lectrice to her boyfriend, in which the main character, a woman named Marie, reads literature to others for a living. She becomes engrossed in the book to the point that she begins imagining herself as Marie: Constance and Marie are played by Miou-Miou, and the movie weaves back and forth between their stories.

Marie embarks on her new profession with gusto. As she reads to her clients, all of whom are seeking a little more than the solace of literature, she works a fantastical transformation on them. Her clients include the widow of a Marxist general (María Casares), a nervous businessman (Patrick Chesnais), a retired magistrate, and a handicapped teenage boy. Soon the clients' friends and families become involved, as does her professor (Christian Blanc). The general's widow's maidservant and the boy's friends from school become affected by the readings, and Constance has an affair with the businessman. Books read include The Lover (by Marguerite Duras, read to the sexually frustrated businessman), and the works of Marquis de Sade (read to the judge and his libertine friends).

== Cast ==
- Miou-Miou as Constance / Marie
- Régis Royer as Éric
- Maria Casarès as The General's widow
- Patrick Chesnais as The CEO
- Pierre Dux as Magistrat
- Christian Ruché as Jean / Philippe
- Brigitte Catillon as Éric's mother
- Marianne Denicourt as Bella B.
- Charlotte Farran as Coralie
- Clotilde de Bayser as Coralie's mother
- Jean-Luc Boutté as The Inspector
- Simon Eine as The professor
- Maria de Medeiros as The nurse
- André Wilms as The man of the Saint-Landry street
- Sylvie Laporte as Françoise
- Léo Campion as The grandfather

== Awards and nominations ==
- César Awards (France)
  - Won: Best Actor – Supporting Role (Patrick Chesnais)
  - Nominated: Best Actress – Leading Role (Miou-Miou)
  - Nominated: Best Actress – Supporting Role (María Casares)
  - Nominated: Best Director (Michel Deville)
  - Nominated: Best Editing (Raymonde Guyot)
  - Nominated: Best Film
  - Nominated: Best Poster (Benjamin Baltimore)
  - Nominated: Best Production Design (Thierry Leproust)
  - Nominated: Best Original Screenplay or Adaptation (Michel or Rosalinde Deville)
- Louis Delluc Prize (France)
  - Won: Best Film
- National Board of Review (U.S.)
  - Nominated: Best Foreign Language Film

The film was selected as the French entry for the Best Foreign Language Film at the 61st Academy Awards, but was not accepted as a nominee.

== Music ==
The film features music by Ludwig van Beethoven. The music titles are uncredited, but the following musicians are credited: Jean-François Heisser (piano), Elisabeth Balmas (violin), Roland Pidoux (cello), Bruno Pasquier (viola), Michel Moraguès (flute) and Jacques Di Donato (clarinet).

- Piano Sonata No. 17 (Tempest) - III. Allegretto
- Violin Sonata No. 8 - III. Allegro vivace
- Piano Sonata No. 21 (Waldstein)
- Violin Sonata No. 5 (Spring Sonata) - III. Scherzo: Allegro molto
- Piano Trio, Op. 11 (Gassenhauer) - III. Tema con variazioni
- Serenade for flute, violin and viola
- Cello Sonata No.1
- Symphony No. 3 (Sinfonia Eroica) - II. Marcia funebre: Adagio assai

== See also ==
- List of submissions to the 61st Academy Awards for Best Foreign Language Film
- List of French submissions for the Academy Award for Best Foreign Language Film
