= Chinese Puzzle =

2013 film by Cédric Klapisch

- Theatrical release poster
- French: Casse-tête chinois
- Directed by: Cédric Klapisch
- Written by: Cédric Klapisch
- Produced by: Bruno Levy
- Starring: Romain Duris; Audrey Tautou; Cécile de France; Kelly Reilly; Sandrine Holt; Margaux Mansart; Pablo Mugnier-Jacob; Flore Bonaventura; Benoît Jacquot
- Cinematography: Natasha Braier
- Edited by: Anne-Sophie Bion
- Music by: Loïk Dury; Christophe "Disco" Minck
- Production companies: Ce qui me meut; StudioCanal; France 2 Cinéma; Panache Productions; La Cie Cinématographique; RTBF; Belgacom
- Distributed by: StudioCanal (France); Cinéart (Belgium)
- Release dates: 23 August 2013 (Angoulême); 4 December 2013 (France); 11 December 2013 (Belgium)
- Running time: 117 minutes
- Countries: France; Belgium
- Languages: French; English
- Budget: €17.3 million ($18.6 million)
- Box office: $17 million

Chinese Puzzle (French: Casse-tête chinois) is a 2013 romantic comedy-drama film written and directed by Cédric Klapisch. It is the third and final installment in the "Spanish Apartment" trilogy, following L'Auberge espagnole (2002) and Russian Dolls (2005).

The film had its world premiere at the 2013 Angoulême Francophone Film Festival. It was released theatrically in France on 4 December 2013 by StudioCanal and in Belgium on 11 December 2013 by Cinéart.

== Plot ==
After 10 years of marriage, the once-happy lovers Xavier Rousseau and Wendy separate. When she moves with their two children, Tom and Mia, to New York City, he also moves there to be near the children. While Wendy lives with her new boyfriend John, a wealthy American, in a luxury apartment overlooking Central Park, Xavier initially stays with his lesbian Belgian friend Isabelle (who is pregnant thanks to a sperm donation from Xavier) and her Chinese-American girlfriend Ju in their Brooklyn loft. He soon moves into Ju's former apartment in Chinatown. Struggling to finish his latest novel about the complications of life, titled Chinese Puzzle, Xavier is assisted by brief visions of Arthur Schopenhauer and Georg Wilhelm Friedrich Hegel. He regularly discusses his novel with his Paris-based editor over Skype sessions, often lying about his progress.

Staying on a tourist visa, Xavier is advised by his lawyer to seek illegal employment and marry for a green card. After rescuing a cab driver from a road-rage incident, the grateful driver agrees to have Xavier marry his Chinese-American niece, Nancy, who is amenable and complicit. However, the immigration official interviewing Xavier and Nancy is not entirely convinced of the legitimacy of their marriage. Meanwhile, Xavier's French ex-girlfriend, Martine, visits him while on a business trip and returns a second time with her own two children on spring break. Xavier and Martine briefly attempt to rekindle their relationship.

Sometime after giving birth, Isabelle reveals to Xavier that she has been cheating on Ju with their newly hired Belgian babysitter, also named Isabelle. Although stunned by Isabelle's confession, Xavier allows her to use his apartment for a tryst with her namesake one day. Shortly afterwards, Ju calls to inform Xavier that immigration officials will conduct a surprise inspection of his apartment in half an hour, telling him to meet her there. Just before Ju arrives at the apartment, Xavier rushes over in time and urges the two Isabelles to sneak out the window. Xavier and the arriving Nancy successfully convince the immigration officials that they live together in the apartment.

As Martine sets out to return to Paris with her children, Xavier races to her shuttle bus, confesses his love, and asks her to stay and live with him. She agrees, and they kiss. During a video call with Xavier, his editor criticises his finished novel's happy ending. While Martine chafes at the editor's remarks, Xavier explains that "when you find happiness, there's nothing more to say." When the editor asks if he is referring to life or the novel, Xavier and Martine simply smile.

Xavier, Martine and their respective children, along with Isabelle, Ju and Nancy, happily walk in a celebratory parade down a Chinatown street.

== Cast ==
- Romain Duris as Xavier Rousseau
- Audrey Tautou as Martine
- Cécile de France as Isabelle
- Kelly Reilly as Wendy
- Sandrine Holt as Ju
- Flore Bonaventura as Isabelle, the babysitter
- Jochen Hägele as Hegel
- Benoît Jacquot as Xavier's father
- Pablo Mugnier-Jacob as Tom
- Margaux Mansart as Mia
- Li Jun Li as Nancy
- Peter McRobbie as the immigration office agent
- Jason Kravits as Xavier's lawyer
- Peter Hermann as John
- Martine Demaret as Xavier's mother
- Vanessa Guide as the nurse
- Dominique Besnehard as the editor
- Zinedine Soualem as Mr. Boubaker
- Kyan Khojandi as Antoine Garceau
- Adrian Martinez as the courier boss
- Larry Fessenden as rocker #1

== Reception ==
The film garnered favourable reviews. On the review aggregator website Rotten Tomatoes, the film holds an approval rating of 79% based on 67 reviews, with an average rating of 6.5/10. The website's critics consensus reads, "Pleasantly easygoing and consistently funny, Chinese Puzzle offers a suitably endearing conclusion to Cédric Klapisch's Trilogy of Xavier." Metacritic, which uses a weighted average, assigned the film a score of 64 out of 100, based on 24 critics, indicating "generally favorable" reviews.

The film was nominated for Best Music Written for a Film at the 39th César Awards, and came second for the Audience Award for Best Narrative Feature at the 57th San Francisco International Film Festival.
