= Carlton Livingston =

Jamaican singer

Carlton Livingston (born September 19, 1954) is a Jamaican reggae vocalist, known for his 1984 hit "100 Weight of Collie Weed".

== Early life ==
Livingston was born in St. Mary, Jamaica. He grew up singing in church. In high school at Trenchtown Cooperative, he heard Bob Marley perform. He started a sound system "Fantastic Three" with Lone Ranger. Tony Walcott discovered the sound system and invited Livingston and Lone Ranger to record with him.

== Career ==
Livingston's recording career began in 1978 with his first recording at Joseph Hoo Kim's Channel One recording studio. This was the album "The Tale of Two Cities." He has recorded with producers including Coxone Dodd, Winston Riley, Sly& Robbie, Clive Jarrett, and King Jammy. Livingston made his breakthrough in 1981 with his conscious roots reggae vocal and dub discomix, Trodding Through The Jungle recorded with Flabba Holt of the Roots Radics, then gaining further success with his 1984 hit 100 Weight of Collie Weed. In the 1990s, he recorded Rumors with Shabba Ranks, produced by Bobby Digital. Livingston moved to Brooklyn in the 1980s, where he lives to this day.

Livingston's music has been covered by Gregory Isaacs, Dennis Brown, Sanchez, Carl Meeks, Shinehead and Sublime.
