= Lone Ranger (musician) =

Jamaican reggae deejay (born 1958)

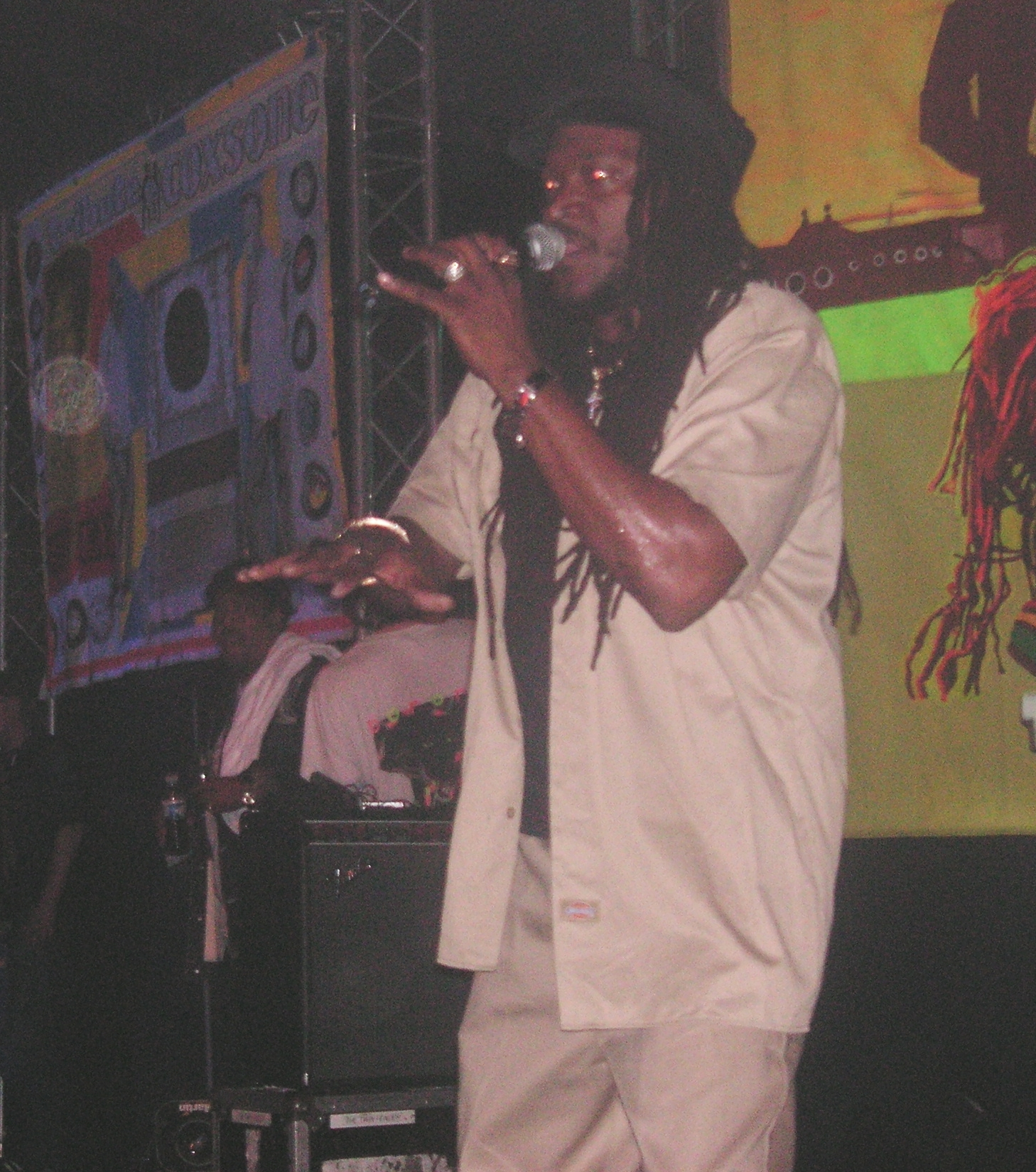
- Lone Ranger in concert in Chartres (France) on 21 October 2006

Background information
- Born: Anthony Alphanso Waldron; 2 November 1958 (age 67)
- Origin: Kingston, Jamaica
- Genres: Reggae, dancehall
- Years active: Late 1970s–mid-1980s; late 1990s–present

Lone Ranger (born Anthony Alphanso Waldron, 2 November 1958) is a Jamaican reggae deejay who recorded nine albums between the late 1970s and mid-1980s.

== Biography ==
Waldron spent much of his youth in Tottenham, United Kingdom, before returning to Jamaica in 1971. He began his recording career with Clement "Coxsone" Dodd's Studio One label. He initially worked as a duo with Welton Irie, but soon began recording solo, having a big hit in Jamaica with "Love Bump". He also worked on the Virgo Sound sound system. He had a number one UK reggae chart album in 1980 with Barnabas Collins. He is regarded as one of the most lyrically inventive deejays of his era, and was a major influence on British deejays of the early 1980s. He relocated to the United States in the mid-1980s, but returned to Jamaica in 1998, and began performing on sound systems once again.

== Discography ==
=== Albums ===
- On the Other Side of Dub (1977) Studio One (reissued (1991 & 2007) Heartbeat
- Barnabas in Collins Wood (aka Barnabas Collins) (1979) GG's
- Rosemarie (1981) Black Joy (UK indie No. 29)
- Badda Dan Dem (1982) Studio One
- Hi-Yo, Silver, Away! (1982) Greensleeves (UK indie No. 19)
- M-16 (1982) Hitbound/J&L
- Dee Jay Daddy (1984) Techniques
- Learn to Drive (1985) Bebo's
- Top of the Class (2002) Studio One
- Kulchaklash (2005) T.I.M.E.C. (with Grant Phabao)
- Sweet Talking (2010) T.I.M.E.C./Colored-Inc. (with Grant Phabao)
- Dancehall Vibe EP (2017) Caribic Night Records/VPAL Music (with Carlton Livingston & Tandaro)

=== Compilation albums ===
- Collections (1994) Grapevine
- Rosemarie Meet DJ Daddy (2005) Techniques
- Dub Salvador (2006) T.I.M.E.C./Paris DJs
