= Raymonde Guyot =

French film editor

Raymonde Guyot (4 January 1935 – 18 March 2021) was a French film editor. She won the César Award for Best Editing in 1979 and 1986.
