= L'Auberge espagnole =

2002 film by Cédric Klapisch

- French theatrical release poster
- Directed by: Cédric Klapisch
- Written by: Cédric Klapisch
- Produced by: Bruno Levy
- Starring: Romain Duris; Judith Godrèche; Audrey Tautou; Cécile de France; Kelly Reilly; Cristina Brondo; Kevin Bishop; Barnaby Metschurat; Federico D'Anna; Iddo Goldberg; Christian Pagh
- Cinematography: Dominique Colin
- Edited by: Francine Sandberg
- Music by: Loïk Dury a.k.a. Kouz 1
- Production companies: Ce qui me meut; StudioCanal; France 2 Cinéma; BAC Films; Mate Productions; Castelao Producciones
- Distributed by: Mars Distribution (France); Filmax (Spain)
- Release dates: 17 May 2002 (Cannes); 19 June 2002 (France); 22 November 2002 (Spain)
- Running time: 122 minutes
- Countries: France; Spain
- Languages: French; English; Catalan; Spanish
- Budget: €5 million
- Box office: $33.3 million

L'Auberge espagnole (French: [lobɛʁʒ ɛspaɲɔl], lit. 'The Spanish Inn'), released in English as The Spanish Apartment and Pot Luck, is a 2002 romantic comedy-drama film written and directed by Cédric Klapisch. A co-production between France and Spain, the film stars Romain Duris, Judith Godrèche, Audrey Tautou, Cécile de France, Kelly Reilly, Cristina Brondo, Kevin Bishop, Barnaby Metschurat, Federico D'Anna, Iddo Goldberg and Christian Pagh.

The film follows Xavier, an economics graduate student from France who spends a year in Barcelona to study through the Erasmus Programme, sharing an apartment with fellow Erasmus students from all over Western Europe. The dialogue is mainly in French, English, Catalan and Spanish, while featuring Danish, German and Italian as additional languages.

It is the first instalment in the "Spanish Apartment" trilogy, which also includes Russian Dolls (2005) and Chinese Puzzle (2013). A television series sequel to the trilogy, Greek Salad, was released on Amazon Prime Video in 2023.

== Plot ==
Xavier, a 24-year-old economics graduate student and aspiring writer from Paris, embarks on a year-long Erasmus exchange to Barcelona to study economics, as well as to learn Spanish in order to qualify for a prospective job at the French Ministry of Finance, much to the dismay of his girlfriend Martine. Upon arrival in Barcelona, Xavier meets a married couple from France at the airport, a friendly neurologist named Jean-Michel and his shy wife Anne-Sophie. They invite him to stay in their home until he finds a place to live.

Xavier eventually finds a shared apartment with other students from all over Western Europe: Soledad from Catalonia and her boyfriend, Lars from Denmark; Wendy from England; Alessandro from Italy; and Tobias from Germany. The flatmates develop a companionship as they struggle with their different languages and cultures. When the landlord raises the rent, Xavier invites Isabelle, a Belgian lesbian he befriended in his economics class at the University of Barcelona, to move into the apartment.

By the time Martine visits Xavier in Barcelona, their relationship has become strained. Xavier soon begins an affair with Anne-Sophie, using seduction tips that he learned from Isabelle. When Wendy's younger brother William comes from England to stay in the apartment for a while, he creates tension due to his abrasive manner and culturally insensitive comments about the nationalities of the flatmates. Later, when Xavier visits Paris for a day, Martine breaks up with him, accusing him of only caring about himself, his studies and his career.

Back in Barcelona, Xavier becomes depressed over the breakup and has visions of Dutch humanist Erasmus. He seeks Jean-Michel's advice, but he tells Xavier that Anne-Sophie has confessed to the affair, and orders him to stop seeing her. When Wendy's boyfriend Alistair arrives for a surprise visit while she is in bed with Bruce, an American she met during a night out, the flatmates work together to help Wendy cover up her affair, with William pretending to be Bruce's lover.

After saying goodbye to his new friends at his farewell party, Xavier returns to Paris, where he meets with Martine one last time before they part amicably. On his first day on the job at the Ministry of Finance, Xavier impulsively runs away and pursues his dream of becoming a writer, recounting his experiences in Barcelona in a story titled The Spanish Inn.

== Cast ==
- Romain Duris as Xavier
- Judith Godrèche as Anne-Sophie
- Audrey Tautou as Martine
- Cécile de France as Isabelle
- Kelly Reilly as Wendy
- Cristina Brondo as Soledad
- Federico D'Anna as Alessandro
- Barnaby Metschurat as Tobias
- Christian Pagh as Lars
- Kevin Bishop as William
- Xavier de Guillebon as Jean-Michel
- Wladimir Yordanoff as Jean-Charles Perrin
- Irene Montalà as Neus
- Javier Coromina as Juan
- Iddo Goldberg as Alistair
- Martine Demaret as Xavier's mother
- Olivier Raynal as Bruce
- Paulina Gálvez as the flamenco teacher
- Jacno as Xavier's father
- Zinedine Soualem as the barman

== Title ==
The phrase auberge espagnole is a French idiom, literally translated as "Spanish inn" or "Spanish hotel". It describes a place where customers can eat what they bring – by extension, that one must be independent.

Another French interpretation is what in English is known as "Going Dutch" or "potluck", hence its English title.

A third meaning of auberge espagnole is a common resting area for travellers from a variety of different cultures and regions.

== Soundtrack ==
- Radiohead – "No Surprises"
- Daft Punk – "Aerodynamic"
- Sonia & Selena – "Que Viva La Noche"
- Marc-Antoine Charpentier – "Te Deum"
- Ali Farka Touré – "Ai Du"
- Frédéric Chopin – "Opus 64 No 2 Waltz in C sharp minor"
- Africando All Stars – "Betece"
- Mala Rodriguez – "La Cocinera"

== Reception ==
=== Critical response ===
On the review aggregator website Rotten Tomatoes, the film holds an approval rating of 76% based on 92 reviews, with an average rating of 6.8/10. The website's critics consensus reads: "This multicultural comedy captures the chaos and excitement of being young." Metacritic, which uses a weighted average, assigned the film a score of 65 out of 100, based on 31 critics, indicating "generally favorable" reviews.

=== Accolades ===
Awards and nominations for L'Auberge espagnole
Award	Category	Recipient	Result
Brisbane International Film Festival	Audience Award	L'Auberge espagnole	Won
César Awards	Best Film	L'Auberge espagnole	Nominated
César Awards	Best Director	Cédric Klapisch	Nominated
César Awards	Best Supporting Actress	Judith Godrèche	Nominated
César Awards	Most Promising Actress	Cécile de France	Won
César Awards	Best Original Screenplay or Adaptation	Cédric Klapisch	Nominated
César Awards	Best Editing	Francine Sandberg	Nominated
European Film Awards	People's Choice Award for Best European Film	L'Auberge espagnole	Nominated
Karlovy Vary International Film Festival	Audience Award	L'Auberge espagnole	Won
Lumière Awards	Best Screenplay	Cédric Klapisch	Won
Lumière Awards	Most Promising Actress	Cécile de France	Won
Sydney Film Festival	Audience Award	L'Auberge espagnole	Won
Vancouver Film Critics Circle Awards	Best Foreign Language Film	L'Auberge espagnole	Nominated
