= Riens du tout =

Riens du Tout
- Film poster
- Directed by: Cédric Klapisch
- Written by: Cédric Klapisch; Jackie Berroyer
- Produced by: Adeline Lecallier
- Starring: Fabrice Luchini; Daniel Berlioux
- Cinematography: Dominique Colin
- Edited by: Francine Sandberg
- Music by: Jeff Cohen
- Distributed by: MKL Distribution
- Release date: 11 November 1992
- Running time: 95 minutes
- Country: France
- Language: French
- Box office: $3.7 million

Riens du tout (English: Little Nothings) is a 1992 French film directed by Cédric Klapisch and written by him with Jackie Berroyer. Featuring Fabrice Luchini and an ensemble cast, in many often humorous cameos it explores the effects on the staff of a revival plan for a failing department store in Paris.

== Plot ==
After 100 years, the Grandes Galeries department store in Paris is sinking: staff are listless, customers staying away, and profits vanishing. The board hire Mr Lepetit, giving him one year to turn it round or else it will close. They are in talks with Japanese investors who want the site for a luxury hotel.

His plan starts with the staff who, he argues, need to believe in themselves, believe in each other, and transmit that belief to customers. A huge programme of activities commences, to build up the individuals and build a team spirit. Human nature being what it is, and the French being who they are, there are difficulties and there are failures. Overall, by the end of the year the remaining staff are well motivated, the store is well thought of, and profits have boomed.

The board thank Lepetit, sack him, and close the store down. His efforts, and those of all the staff who believed in him, have doubled the price the Japanese are willing to pay.

== Cast ==
- Fabrice Luchini as Lepetit
- Daniel Berlioux as Jacques Martin
- Marc Berman as Pizzuti
- Olivier Broche as Lefèvre
- Antoine Chappey as François
- Jean-Pierre Darroussin as Domrémy
- Aurélie Guichard as Vanessa
- Billy Komg as Mamadou
- Odette Laure as Madame Yvonne
- Elisabeth Macocco as Madame Dujardin
- Marc Maury as Johnny Bonjour
- Pierre-Olivier Mornas as Roger
- Jean-Michel Martial as Hubert
- Maïté Nahyr as La directrice de coordination
- Fred Personne as Monsieur Roi
- Lucette Raillat as Micheline
- Eric Forterre as Fred
- Nathalie Richard as Claire
- Marie Riva as Zaza
- Sophie Simon as Pat
- Zinedine Soualem as Aziz
- Marina Tomé as Monitrice sourire
- Karin Viard as Isabelle
- Coraly Zahonero as Véronique
- Simon Abkarian as Le danseur grec
- Olivier Rabourdin as Chanteur métro

== About the film ==
In this first film Klapisch's main purpose was to show the difference between the behavior of a person when he is alone and when he is in a group. In order to show this, he filmed the employees during their commute, at work and in other scenes of daily life, which made Klapisch style's reputation. This topic will become recurrent in many of his films.
