= Romain Duris =

French actor (born 1974)

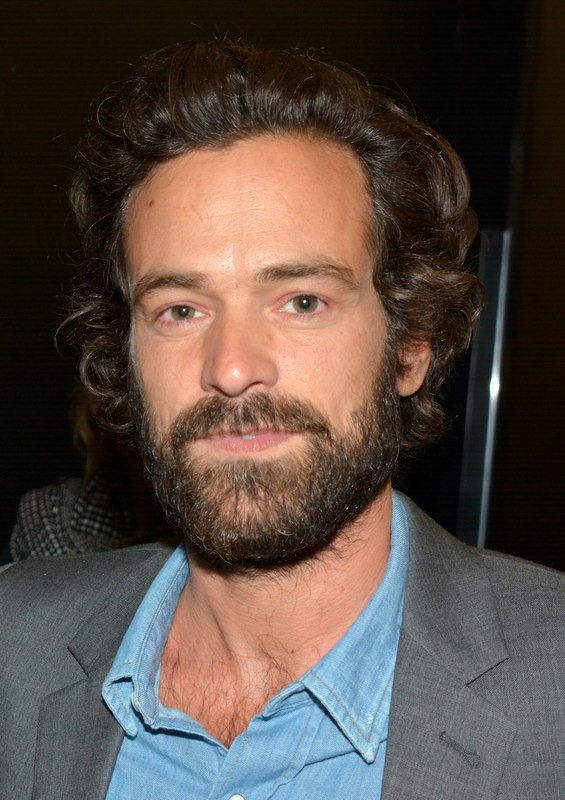
- Duris in 2014
- Born: 28 May 1974 (age 52); Paris, France
- Occupation: Actor
- Years active: 1993–present
- Partner: Olivia Bonamy
- Children: 2

Romain Duris (French pronunciation: [ʁɔmɛ̃ dyʁis]; born 28 May 1974) is a French actor.

== Personal life and education ==
Duris was born in Paris, son of a father who is an engineer-architect and a mother who is a dancer. His father is related to Armand-Gaston Camus, an archivist who founded the Archives nationales. His mother is a descendant of 18th-century Swedish painter Alexander Roslin and his wife. Duris has a sister, pianist Caroline Duris, who played on the soundtrack of the film The Beat That My Heart Skipped (2005), in which he acted.

Duris studied arts at university but first decided to follow a career in music, forming a jazz-funk band. Music remains a major interest. Before going into acting, he started an acid-jazz band in which he was a drummer. In 1995, he was featured in a pop video for singer Princess Erika, "Faut qu'j'travaille" (I Need To Work), where he played the role of a small-time gangster.

Duris lives in Paris near La Bastille, with his actress girlfriend Olivia Bonamy. They have two sons.

== Film career ==
In 1993, Duris was noticed by a casting director who saw him waiting in a queue. He offered the younger man a part in the Cédric Klapisch film Le péril jeune (1994).

Duris's additional collaborations with Klapisch include the Spanish Apartment Trilogy (L'Auberge Espagnole, The Russian Dolls, and Chinese Puzzle). He played a French exchange student Xavier Rousseau, which was one of his best-known roles because of the trilogy.

Duris gained international recognition for his performance in the film The Beat That My Heart Skipped (2005), directed by Jacques Audiard. He won the Lumière Award for Best Actor and received his first nomination for the César Award for Best Actor.

He has since gone onto become a major star in the French film industry and has starred in many successful and critically acclaimed films: Dans Paris (2006), Paris (2008), Heartbreaker (2010), The Big Picture (2010), Populaire (2012), Mood Indigo (2013), The New Girlfriend (2014), All the Money in the World (2017), The Animal Kingdom (2023), The Three Musketeers: D'Artagnan (2023) and The Three Musketeers: Milady (2023).

His roles have ranged from gangsters, as in Dobermann through romantic leads as in Heartbreaker, to action heroes as in Arsène Lupin.

== Filmography ==
Year	Title	Role	Notes	Source
1994	Le péril jeune	Tomasi		
1994	Frères: La roulette rouge	Marco		
1996	56 fois par semaine		Short film	
1996	Mémoires d'un jeune con	Luc		
1996	When the Cat's Away	Le joueur de batterie		
1997	Dobermann	Manu		
1997	Gadjo dilo	Stéphane	Nominated – Acteurs à l'Écran for Best Actor; Nominated – César Award for Most Promising Actor	
1998	Déjà mort	Romain		
1998	Les Kidnappeurs	Zero		
1999	Peut-être	Arthur	Lumière Award for Most Promising Actor; Nominated – César Award for Most Promising Actor	
1999	Je suis né d'une cigogne	Otto		
2001	CQ	Hippie Filmmaker		
2001	Le Petit poucet	Un garde de la reine		
2001	Being Light	Maxime Lecocq		
2002	Filles perdues, cheveux gras	Mathieu		
2002	The Spanish Apartment	Xavier Rousseau		
2002	17 fois Cécile Cassard	Matthieu		
2002	Adolphe	D'Erfeuil		
2003	Pas si grâve	Léo		
2003	Osmose	Rémi		
2003	Schimkent Hotel	Romain		
2003	Le Divorce	Yves		
2003	Les Clefs de bagnole			
2004	Exils	Zano		
2004	Arsène Lupin	Arsène Lupin		
2005	The Beat That My Heart Skipped	Thomas Seyr	Lumière Award for Best Actor; Globes de Cristal Award for Best Actor; Nominated – César Award for Best Actor; Nominated – European Film Award for Best Actor; Nominated – NRJ Ciné Award for Actor of the Year	
2005	The Russian Dolls	Xavier Rousseau		
2006	Dans Paris	Paul		
2007	Molière	Molière	Globes de Cristal Award for Best Actor	
2007	L'âge d'homme... maintenant ou jamais!	Samuel / Leonardo da Vinci		
2008	Paris	Pierre		
2008	Afterwards	Nathan Del Amico		
2009	Persécution	Daniel		
2010	Heartbreaker	Alex Lippi	Nominated – César Award for Best Actor; Nominated – Satellite Award for Best Actor – Motion Picture Musical or Comedy; Nominated –Globes de Cristal Award for Best Actor	
2010	The Big Picture	Paul Exben		
2010	Tangled	Eugene "Flynn Rider" Fitzherbert	French dub	
2012	Populaire	Louis Échard		
2013	Mood Indigo	Colin		
2013	Casse-tête chinois	Xavier Rousseau		
2014	Démons	Franck	TV movie	
2014	The New Girlfriend	David / Virginia	Nominated—César Award for Best Actor; Nominated—Lumière Award for Best Actor	
2016	Odd Job	Jacques		
2016	Ceasefire	Georges Laffont		
2017	The Confession	Father Léon Morin		
2016	Iris	Max Lopez		
2017	Madame Hyde	Le proviseur		
2017	All the Money in the World	Cinquanta		
2018	Isle of Dogs	Rex	French voice	
2018	Just a Breath Away	Mathieu		
2018	Black Tide	Yann Bellaile		
2018	Our Struggles	Olivier	Nominated - César Award for Best Actor; Nominated—Lumière Award for Best Actor	
2021	Eiffel	Gustave Eiffel		
2022	Final Cut	Rémi		
2022	Waiting for Bojangles	Georges Fouquet		
2023	The Three Musketeers: D'Artagnan	Aramis		
2023	The Animal Kingdom	François		
2023	Daaaaaalí!	editor		
2023	The Three Musketeers: Milady	Aramis		
2024	Night Call	Yannick		
2024	A Missing Part	Jay		
2027	Fantômas: The New World	Juve	Filming	
