= Noëlle Boisson =

French film editor (born 1944)

- Born: 1 December 1944 (age 81)
- Occupation: Film editor
- Children: Lola Doillon

Noëlle Boisson (born 1 December 1944) is a French film editor. She was Academy Award-nominated in 1989 for The Bear, and she has won the César Award for Best Editing in 1991 for Cyrano de Bergerac, and Two Brothers in 2005. She is a frequent collaborator with Jean-Jacques Annaud and Jean-Paul Rappeneau.

== Selected filmography (as editor) ==
- The Bear (1988)
- Cyrano de Bergerac (1990)
- The Lover (1992)
- The Horseman on the Roof (1995)
- Seven Years in Tibet (1997)
- Two Brothers (2004)
