= Hypnotized and Hysterical (Hairstylist Wanted) =

- Film poster
- Filles perdues, cheveux gras
- Directed by: Claude Duty
- Written by: Jean-Philippe Barrau; Claude Duty; Pascale Faure
- Produced by: Bruno Levy
- Starring: Amira Casar; Marina Foïs; Olivia Bonamy; Charles Berling; Sergi López
- Cinematography: Bruno Romiguière
- Edited by: Agnès Mouchel
- Music by: Valmont
- Distributed by: Mars Distribution
- Release dates: 17 May 2002 (Cannes); 10 September 2002 (France)
- Running time: 100 minutes
- Country: France
- Language: French
- Budget: $2.8 million
- Box office: $1.3 million

Hypnotized and Hysterical (Hairstylist Wanted) (original title: Filles perdues, cheveux gras English: Lost Girls, Greasy Hair) is a 2002 French musical comedy-drama film about the crossing paths of three lost young women. It was directed by Claude Duty.

The film premiered at the Cannes Film Festival on 17 May 2002.

== Plot ==
Three lost women cross paths and help each other. Elodie (Olivia Bonamy) wants her daughter back, Natacha (Marina Foïs) wants her cat back, and Marianne (Amira Casar) wants her soul back.

== Cast ==
- Amira Casar as Marianne
- Marina Foïs as Natacha
- Olivia Bonamy as Élodie
- Charles Berling as Arnaud
- Sergi López as Philippe
- Léa Drucker as Coraline
- Esse Lawson as Cindy
- Margot Abascal as Corine
- Evelyne Buyle as Madame Pélissier
- Judith El Zein as Marianne's Mother
- Béatrice Costantini as Natasha's boss
- Amadou Diallo as Kirikou
- Jean-François Gallotte as Jean-François
- Amelle Chahbi as Karine
- Lorella Cravotta as Chief Nurse
- Lise Lamétrie as Elodie's colleague

== Accolades ==
Award / Film Festival	Category	Recipients and nominees	Result
Cannes Film Festival	International Critics' Week - Grand Rail d'or		Won
César Awards	Best First Feature Film		Nominated
César Awards	Most Promising Actress	Marina Foïs	Nominated
Deauville American Film Festival	Prix Michel d'Ornano		Won
