= Cédric Klapisch =

French filmmaker

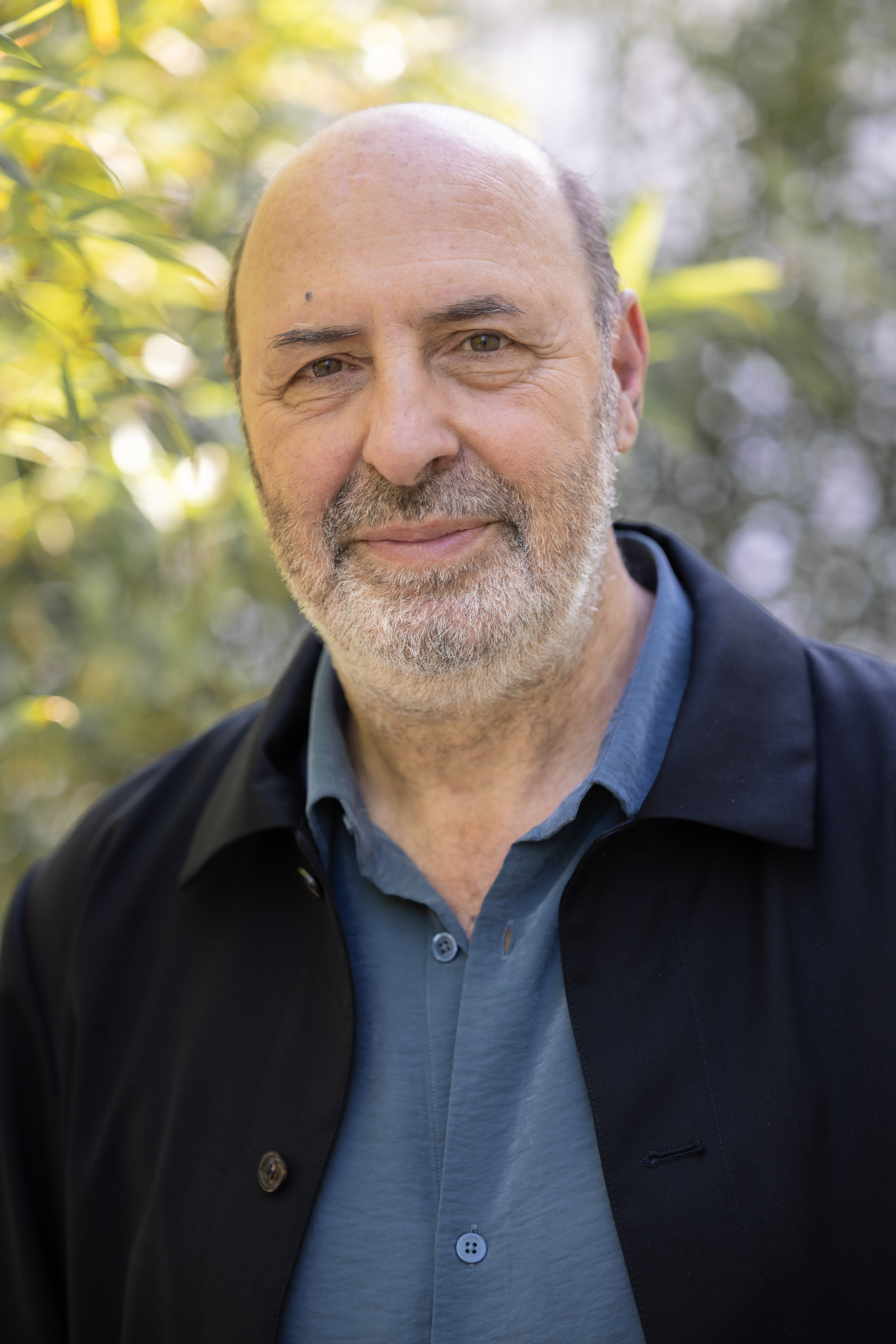
- Klapisch at the 2025 Cannes Film Festival
- Born: 4 September 1961 (age 65); Neuilly-sur-Seine, France
- Occupations: Film director, screenwriter, producer
- Years active: 1986–present
- Spouse: Lola Doillon
- Children: 1
- Website: cedric-klapisch.com

Cédric Klapisch (French: [se.dʁik kla.piʃ]; born 4 September 1961) is a French film director, screenwriter and film producer.

== Life and career ==
Klapisch was born in Neuilly-sur-Seine, Hauts-de-Seine. He is from a Jewish family; his maternal grandparents were deported to Auschwitz. He studied cinema at the University of Paris III: Sorbonne Nouvelle as well as at the University of Paris VIII. He was rejected on two occasions by the French film school Institut des hautes études cinématographiques (IDHEC), now known as La Fémis. He later attended the film school at New York University from 1983 to 1985. During the 1980s, he started to shoot short films such as In transit or Ce qui me meut. He subsequently worked as a scriptwriter and he became a director for feature films. He has also directed a nature documentary for French television.

In 1992, Klapisch shot his first feature film, Riens du tout. A year later, a TV channel asked him to make a film about high school life, set in 1975, Le péril jeune. The film had a very small budget and featured Romain Duris and Vincent Elbaz, who would become two of his favourite actors. Due to its success when broadcast on TV, the film was released in the theaters two years later. During the 1990s, Klapisch made three short films to encourage the use of condoms in combatting AIDS: La chambre, Le Poisson Rouge and Le Ramoneur des Lilas.

In 1996, Klapisch gained greater international recognition after he directed two divergent films, Chacun cherche son chat (When the Cat's Away), and an adaptation of the French theatre comedy Un air de famille. Agnès Jaoui and Jean-Pierre Bacri, the two scriptwriters and main actors, asked him to adapt the play into a film. The film received César Awards for the script and for the female and male supporting roles, Catherine Frot and Jean-Pierre Daroussin. His next film, Peut-être (Maybe), from 1999, featured Jean-Paul Belmondo, Duris and Elbaz.

Klapisch's next film, Ni pour, ni contre (bien au contraire), had its production delayed for 4 months. During this period, he devised a new, low-budget product, which became L'Auberge Espagnole (The Spanish Apartment). Shot in Spain, this film became his greatest box-office success, and he planned three parts to what became known as his Spanish Apartment Trilogy. In 2005, he filmed a sequel to L'Auberge Espagnole, Les Poupées Russes (Russian Dolls), with many of the same actors from L'Auberge Espagnole. His film Paris was released in February 2008, and Ma part du gâteau in 2011. In 2012, Klapisch filmed Casse-tête chinois (Chinese Puzzle). The third installment in the Spanish Apartment Trilogy and the sequel to Les Poupées Russes was released in 2013.

In 2015, he co-founded LaCinetek alongside directors Pascale Ferran and Laurent Cantet. LaCinetek is a streaming platform dedicated to the world's greatest films, selected by filmmakers from all around the globe.

In November 2023, he directed a "wackily updated" production of Mozart's Die Zauberflöte at the Théâtre des Champs-Élysées in Paris.

== Filmography ==
=== Feature film ===
Year	English title	Original title	Director	Writer	Actor	Notes
1992	Little Nothings	Riens du tout	Yes	Yes	Yes	
1994	The Good Old Daze	Le Péril jeune	Yes	Yes	Yes	
1996	When the Cat's Away	Chacun cherche son chat	Yes	Yes	Yes	
1996	Family Resemblances	Un air de famille	Yes	Yes	Yes	
1999	Lila Lili		No	No	Yes	
1999	Maybe; Perhaps	Peut-être	Yes	Yes	Yes	
2002	The Spanish Apartment	L'Auberge espagnole	Yes	Yes	Yes	
2003	Not For, or Against	Ni pour, ni contre (bien au contraire)	Yes	Yes	Yes	
2005	Russian Dolls	Les Poupées russes	Yes	Yes	Yes	
2008	Paris		Yes	Yes	Yes	Also as associate producer (uncredited)
2011	De force		No	No	Yes	Cameo
2011	My Piece of the Pie	Ma part du gâteau	Yes	Yes	Yes	
2013	Chinese Puzzle	Casse-tête chinois	Yes	Yes	Yes	Also as producer
2017	Back to Burgundy	Ce qui nous lie	Yes	Yes	Yes	
2019	Someone, Somewhere	Deux moi	Yes	Yes	Yes	
2022	Rise	En corps	Yes	Yes	Yes	
2025	Colours of Time	La Venue de l'avenir	Yes	Yes	No	
TBA		S'aimer sur Mars	Yes	Yes	TBA	Post-production

=== Short film ===
Year	Title	Director	Writer	Actor
1986	In Transit	Yes	Yes	Yes
1989	Ce qui me meut	Yes	Yes	Yes
1998	Le Ramoneur des Lilas	Yes	Yes	Yes
2013	La Chose sûre	Yes	Yes	

=== Documentary films ===
Year	Title	Director	Writer	Notes
1995	Lumière and Company	Yes		Omnibus documentary
2010	Aurélie Dupont, l'espace d'un instant	Yes		Also cinematographer
2013	La Jeunesse a-t-elle une histoire?		Yes	

=== Television ===
Year	Title	Director	Writer	Notes
1994	3000 scénarios contre un virus	Yes	Yes	2 episodes
2015	Call My Agent!	Yes		2 episodes (including the series first)
2023	Greek Salad	Yes		Directed 3 episodes; Also creator

=== Other credits ===
Year	Title	Notes
2020	Cartier: How Far Would You Go for Love	Advertisement
2020	Quatre chorégraphes d'aujourd'hui à l'Opéra de Paris: Thierrée/Shechter/Pérez/Pite	Filmed opera

In addition to his filmography, in 2023, he has also directed the French music video “Avant Elle” (Before Her) by Aliocha Schneider.

== Awards and nominations ==
Short film

Year	Title	Awards and nominations
1986	In Transit	Clermont-Ferrand International Short Film Festival - Special Jury Award
1989	Ce qui me meut	Clermont-Ferrand International Short Film Festival - Special Jury Award; French Syndicate of Cinema Critics - Best Short Film; Nominated—César Award for Best Fiction Short
1998	Le Ramoneur des Lilas	Sarajevo Film Festival - Audience Award

Feature film

Year	Title	Awards and nominations
1992	Riens du tout	Bogota International Film Festival - Bronze Precolumbian Circle; Nominated—César Award for Best First Feature Film
1994	Le Péril jeune	Festival du Film de Paris - Public Prize; Festival International de Programmes Audiovisuels - Golden FIPA (Fiction)
1996	When the Cat's Away	1996 Berlin International Film Festival - FIPRESCI Prize (Panorama)
1996	Family Resemblances	César Award for Best Writing; Lumières Award for Best Director; Lumières Award for Best Screenplay; Montreal World Film Festival - Special Grand Prize of the Jury; Montreal World Film Festival - People's Choice Award; Nominated—César Award for Best Film; Nominated—César Award for Best Director
2002	L'Auberge Espagnole	Brisbane International Film Festival - Audience Award; Karlovy Vary International Film Festival - Audience Award; Lumières Award for Best Screenplay; Sydney Film Festival - Audience Award; Sydney Film Festival - Prix UIP; Nominated—César Award for Best Film; Nominated—César Award for Best Director; Nominated—César Award for Best Writing; Nominated—European Film Academy People's Choice Award for Best European Film
2005	Russian Dolls	Nominated—Globes de Cristal Award for Best Film
2008	Paris	Nominated—César Award for Best Film
2013	Chinese Puzzle	San Francisco International Film Festival - Audience Award (2nd place)
