= De l'autre côté =

2002 film by Chantal Akerman

- Directed by: Chantal Akerman
- Release date: 2002
- Running time: 103 minutes
- Countries: Australia; Belgium; Finland; France

De l'autre côté (English: From the Other Side) is a 2002 independent documentary art film directed by Chantal Akerman.

== Reception ==
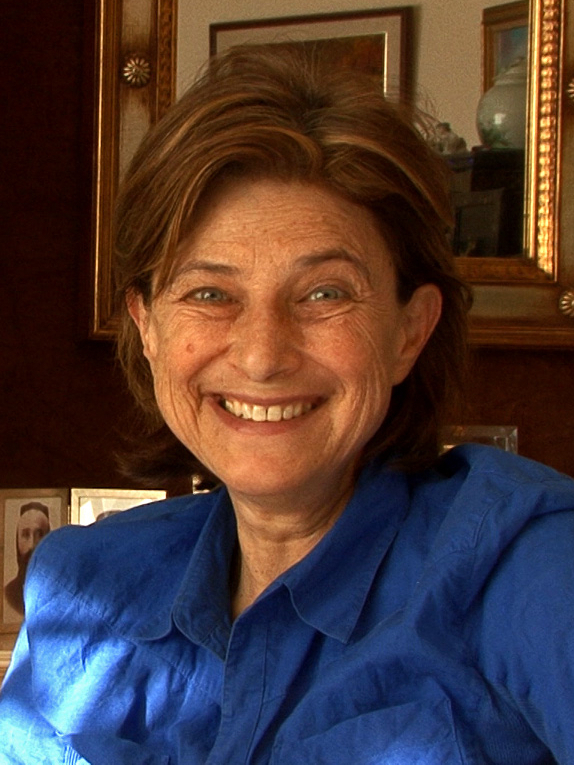
Chantal Akerman in 2012

The film, which premiered at the 2002 Cannes Film Festival and was released on DVD in 2016 as part of a boxset also containing D'Est (1993), Sud (1999), and Down There (2006), looks at the fate of Mexicans who cross the border into the United States. Edited by Claire Atherton, distributed by Shellac and First Run Features, financed by the Ministry of Transport and Communications's Yle TV2-Yle, Special Broadcasting Service, RTBF, and Arte France, and featuring music by Claudio Monteverdi and Frédéric Chopin performed by Natalia Shakhovskaya, it was included (as the fourth place) in the 2002 Cahiers du cinéma annual top ten list, and was also shown at the 2002 Terra di Siena Film Festival, at the 2002 Flanders International Film Festival Ghent (where it was nominated for the Joseph Plateau Award), at the 2002 and 2011 Vienna International Film Festival, at the 2003 International Film Festival Rotterdam, at the 2003 Wisconsin Film Festival, and at the French Institute Alliance Française in 2015.
