= Hotel Monterey =

1972 film by Chantal Akerman

- Poster used for the Criterion Collection release
- Directed by: Chantal Akerman
- Written by: Chantal Akerman
- Produced by: Chantal Akerman
- Cinematography: Babette Mangolte
- Edited by: Geneviève Luciani
- Release date: 11 June 1989 (U.S.)
- Running time: 62 minutes
- Countries: Belgium; U.S.
- Language: Silent

Hotel Monterey is a 1972 American silent documentary structural film directed by Chantal Akerman. It is Akerman's first feature film.

== Synopsis ==
The film consists of a series of silent long takes shot in a hotel in New York City. Shots are meticulously staged to create visual patterns and optical illusions as the film slowly explores several different parts of the hotel, ranging from austere and claustrophobic basement corridors to hotel rooms—some occupied, some not—to skylines of neighboring building roofs and water towers shot from the rooftop.

== Location and production ==
The hotel, located at 215 West 94th Street in Manhattan, opened in 1914 as the Hotel Apthorp. In 1916, the name changed to Hotel Monterey, which it retained until 1976. By 2008, it had become Days Hotel, part of the Days Inn/Quality Inn chain.

Akerman funded the film (and an additional short film, La Chambre) using money that she stole from box office sales of L.A. Plays Itself at the 55th Street Playhouse theater in New York City, where she worked in the ticket booth.

== Release and re-release ==
The Criterion Collection released it through their Eclipse series in 2010, as part of a set titled Chantal Akerman in the Seventies that included four feature films Akerman directed in the 1970s as well as a number of short films, and again in 2024 as part of the set Chantal Akerman Masterpieces, 1968–1978.

In 2013, Akerman introduced Hotel Monterey, along with two other films, La Chambre and News from Home, at the 11th annual "Save and Project" film series at the New York Museum of Modern Art.
