= Sud (1999 film) =

- Directed by: Chantal Akerman
- Produced by: Iikka Vehkalahti
- Edited by: Claire Atherton
- Release date: 1999
- Running time: 71 minutes
- Countries: Belgium; Finland; France
- Language: English

Sud (English: South) is a 71-minute 1999 Belgian-Finnish-French English-language independent documentary art film directed by Chantal Akerman. It deals with the 1998 lynching of James Byrd Jr. in Jasper, Texas, and its aftermath.

== Reception ==
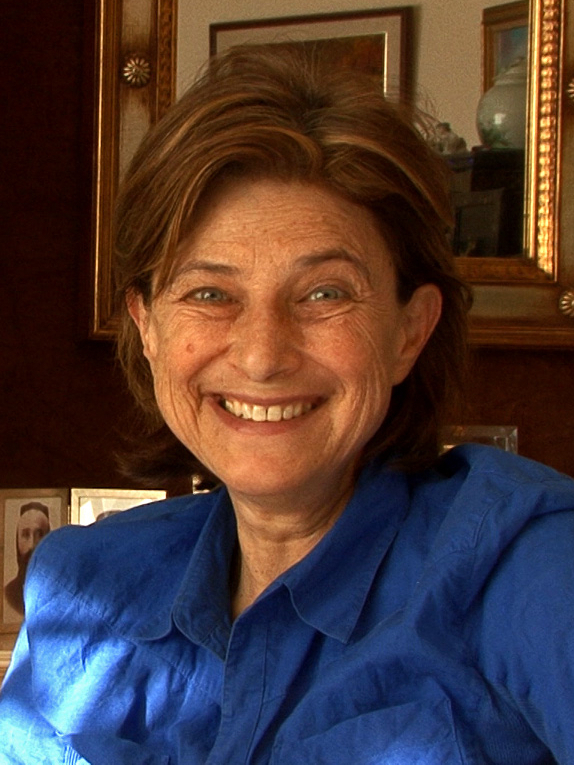
Chantal Akerman in 2012

The film premiered at the 1999 Cannes Film Festival (where it was nominated for the International Confederation of Art Cinemas Award) and was released on DVD in 2016 as part of a boxset also containing D'Est (1993), De l'autre côté (2002), and Down There (2006). Sud examines the effect of the dragging death of James Byrd Jr. on the residents in Jasper, Texas. It was financed by Institut national de l'audiovisuel, La Sept-Arte, RTBF, and the Ministry of Transport and Communications's Yle, produced by Iikka Vehkalahti, and edited by Claire Atherton. It was also shown at the 2000 Thessaloniki International Film Festival, at the 2000 International Film Festival Rotterdam, at the 2000 Thessaloniki Documentary Festival, at the 2001 Nuremberg International Human Rights Film Festival (where it won the Nuremberg International Human Rights Film Award – Special Mention), at the 2006 Buenos Aires International Festival of Independent Cinema, at the 2011 Vienna International Film Festival, and at the 2018 Jerusalem Film Festival.
