= Down There (film) =

2006 film by Chantal Akerman

DVD cover

Down There is a 78-minute 2006 Belgian-French English- and French-language independent documentary art film directed by Chantal Akerman.

== Description and synopsis ==
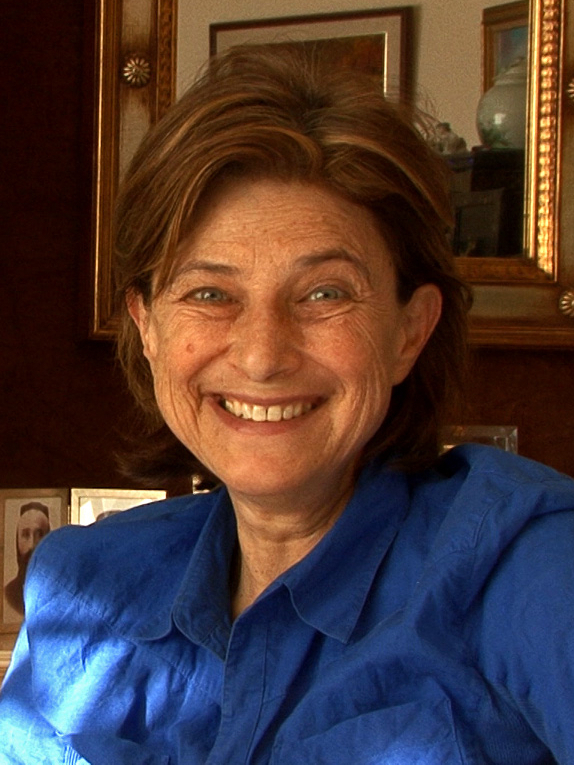
Chantal Akerman in 2012

The film, which premiered at the 56th Berlin International Film Festival and was released on DVD in 2016 as part of a boxset also containing D’Est (1993), Sud (1999), and De l’autre côté (2002), documents Akerman's spending of a month in Tel Aviv-Yafo, in an apartment by the sea, contemplating her family, her Jewish identity, and her childhood. Edited by Claire Atherton, financed by Le Fresnoy, and distributed by Shellac, it was also shown at the 2006 Marseille Festival of Documentary Film (where it won the Grand Prix of the International Competition), at the 2006 Jihlava International Documentary Film Festival (where it was nominated for the Best World Documentary), at the 2006 and 2011 Vienna International Film Festival, at the 2007 Mar del Plata International Film Festival, at the 2018 Jerusalem Film Festival, and at the 2019 International Film Festival Rotterdam, and was nominated for the César Award for Best Documentary Film at the 2007 César Awards.
