= It's a Man's Man's Man's World =

1966 single by James Brown

Single by James Brown

from the album It's a Man's Man's Man's World
- B-side: "Is It Yes or Is It No?"
- Released: April 1966
- Recorded: February 16, 1966
- Studio: Talent Masters, New York City
- Genre: Rhythm and blues, soul
- Length: 2:52
- Label: King
- Songwriters: James Brown; Betty Jean Newsome
- Producer: James Brown

James Brown singles chronology
"Ain't That a Groove Part 1" (1966)	"It's a Man's Man's Man's World" (1966)	"Money Won't Change You" (1966)

Music video
- "It's A Man's Man's Man's World" on YouTube

"It's a Man's Man's Man's World" is a song written by James Brown and Betty Jean Newsome. Brown recorded it on February 16, 1966, in a New York City studio and released it as a single later that year. It reached No. 1 on the Billboard R&B chart and No. 8 on the Billboard Hot 100. Its title is a word play on the 1963 comedy film It's a Mad, Mad, Mad, Mad World.

== Song ==
The song is written in the key of E-flat minor. The lyrics, which Rolling Stone characterized as "biblically chauvinistic", attribute all the works of modern civilization — the car, the train, the boat ("Like Noah made the ark"), and the electric light — to the efforts of men, but claim that it all would "mean nothing without a woman or a girl". The song also states that men made toys for the baby boys and girls, and comments about the fact that "Man makes money" to buy from other men. Before the song's fade, Brown states that man is lost in his bitterness and in the wilderness. Brown's co-writer and onetime girlfriend, Betty Jean Newsome, wrote the lyrics based on her own observations of the relations between the sexes. Newsome claimed in later years that Brown did not write any part of the song, and she argued in court that he sometimes forgot to pay her royalties. In May 1966, Record World magazine reported that Brown, King Records and Dynatone Publishing were being sued by Clamike Records for alleged copyright infringement of the Betty Newsome song "It's a Man's World (But What Would He Do Without a Woman)".

The composition of "It's a Man's Man's Man's World" developed over a period of several years. Tammy Montgomery, better known as Tammi Terrell, recorded "I Cried", a Brown-penned song based on the same chord changes, in 1963. Brown himself recorded a demo version of the song, provisionally entitled "It's a Man's World", in 1964. This version later appeared on the CD compilations The CD of JB and Star Time. Les Buie (guitar) and Bernard Odum (bass) performed on the 1964 song.

The released version of "It's a Man's Man's Man's World" was recorded quickly, in only two takes, with a studio ensemble that included members of Brown's touring band and a string section arranged and conducted by Sammy Lowe. A female chorus was involved in the recording sessions, but their parts were edited out of the song's final master.

"It's a Man's Man's Man's World" became a staple of Brown's live shows for the rest of his career. Its slow, simmering groove and declamatory vocal line made it suitable for long, open-ended performances incorporating spoken ruminations on love and loss and sometimes interpolations from other songs. It appears on almost all of Brown's live albums starting with 1967's Live at the Garden. Brown also recorded a big band jazz arrangement of the song with the Louie Bellson Orchestra for his 1970 album Soul on Top.

Cash Box described the song as a "slow-shufflin' emotion-charged item which points out that men are quite incomplete without women to love 'em."

Brown would later duet on the song with opera star Luciano Pavarotti at a 2002 Pavarotti & Friends concert benefiting Angolan refugees. While Brown sang the original lyrics, Pavarotti sang a new verse of related lyrics, written in Italian.

In 2004, "It's a Man's Man's Man's World" was ranked number 123 on Rolling Stone magazine's list of the 500 greatest songs of all time.

In 2010, the 1966 James Brown recording was inducted into the Grammy Hall of Fame.

== Personnel ==
- James Brown – lead vocal

with studio band:

- Dud Bascomb – trumpet
- Waymon Reed – trumpet
- Lamarr Wright – trumpet
- Haywood Henry – baritone saxophone
- Ian Bridle – piano
- Billy Butler – guitar
- Bernard "Pretty" Purdie – drums

Other players, including trombone, bass and strings, unknown

Arranged and conducted by Sammy Lowe

== Chart positions ==
Chart (1966)	Peak position
Belgium (Ultratop 50 Flanders)	14
Canada Top Singles (RPM)	25
France (SNEP)	49
Spanish Singles Chart	5
UK Singles (Official Charts)	13
US Billboard Hot 100	8
US R&B Singles (Billboard)	1

== Certifications ==
Region	Certification	Certified units/sales
New Zealand (RMNZ)	Gold	15,000^{‡}
^{‡} Sales+streaming figures based on certification alone.

== Renée Geyer version ==
"It's a Man's Man's World"

Single by Renée Geyer

from the album It's a Man's Man's World
- A-side: "It's a Man's Man's Man's World"
- B-side: "Once in a Lifetime Thing"
- Released: November 1974
- Recorded: August 1974
- Studio: Bill Armstrong Studios, Melbourne, Australia
- Genre: Soul
- Length: 3:42
- Label: RCA Records
- Songwriters: James Brown; Betty Jean Newsome
- Producer: Tweed Harris

Renée Geyer singles chronology
"What Do I Do On Sunday Morning?" (1974)	"It's a Man's Man's World" (1974)	"Take Me Where You Took Me Last Night" (1975)

Australian musician Renée Geyer recorded a version in 1974. The song was released in November 1974 as the second single from her second studio album, It's a Man's Man's World. The song peaked at number 44 on the Australian Kent Music Report, becoming her first Australian top 50 single.

=== Track listing ===
Australian 7" Single

- Side A "It's a Man's Man's Man's World" – 3:30
- Side B "Once in a Lifetime Thing" – 3:30

=== Charts ===
Chart (1974/75)	Peak position
Australia (Kent Music Report)	44

== Other cover versions ==
The song has been recorded by many artists in various idioms over the years.

- The Grateful Dead have occasionally covered the song, with Ron "Pigpen" McKernan singing the lead vocal.
- American band The Residents recorded many covers of the song since 1984, and until 2020, performed the piece in many of their concerts.
- British band Brilliant recorded a cover of the song in 1985, peaking at No. 58 in the UK.
- Christina Aguilera performed a critically acclaimed rendition of the song as a posthumous tribute to James Brown at the 2007 Grammy Awards. Her performance has been voted as the 3rd Most Memorable Grammy Performance of all time, as presented in the 2007 CBS television special My Night at the Grammys. Later, in 2021, she performed the song for two nights at the Hollywood Bowl with Gustavo Dudamel and the Los Angeles Philharmonic.
- British soul singer Joss Stone released a live version (recorded at Kennedy Center, Washington, D.C., December 7, 2003) in 2004 as both a vinyl and CD B-side of the A-side single, "Super Duper Love". It was included in a commercial for Chanel's Coco Mademoiselle in 2012 starring Keira Knightley.
- The cast of Glee featuring actress/singer Dianna Agron as her character Quinn Fabray covered the song during the twenty-first episode, entitled "Funk", and released it as a single. The song charted in the Canadian Hot 100 chart at 73, UK Singles Chart at 94 and in the Billboard Hot 100 chart at 95.
- British singer Louisa Johnson performed the song during the semi-final of the twelfth series of The X Factor in 2015. After Johnson advanced to the final, it was selected as her "Song of the Series", which she performed again before going on to win the competition.
- Ventriloquist, Darci Lynne performed a cover with Petunia, her puppet, in Season 14 of America's Got Talent as a guest performer. Petunia dedicated the song to Preacher Lawson.
- British artist RAYE performed and subsequently released a live version of the song from her July 18, 2024, performance at the Montreux Jazz Festival. The cover was a part of RAYE's second live album and was accompanied by 6 other songs.

== Sampling ==
- The song is sampled on Guilty Simpson's song "Man's World" produced by J Dilla.
- The song is sampled by Agust D with his self-produced song "Agust D".

== Answer songs ==
- Neneh Cherry released the answer song "Woman" on her 1996 album Man in response to the chauvinism of the original.
- The band Napalm Death released the song "It's a M.A.N.S World!", which attacks and parodies the ideas of chauvinism and patriarchy ideas. This was on their 1988 album From Enslavement to Obliteration.

== Uses in popular culture ==
- The song was featured in the 1993 film A Bronx Tale, which starred actor Robert De Niro, who also directed the film.
- The song was featured in the 1993 television film Portrait of a Young Girl at the End of the 60s in Brussels, directed by Chantal Akerman.
- The song was also featured in the 2000 Liam Neeson/Sandra Bullock action comedy Gun Shy.
- The song appeared in the opening of the 2012 comedy hit Think Like a Man, starring Kevin Hart, Gabrielle Union and Taraji P. Henson.
- The song was featured in the 2014 James Brown biopic Get On Up, starring Chadwick Boseman, Dan Aykroyd, and Viola Davis.
- The song was featured in the 2019 film The Kitchen.
- The song was featured in the 2020 film Birds of Prey, starring Margot Robbie, Jurnee Smollett, and Ewan McGregor.
- The ending song in The Godfather II.
- The song is featured in the video game MLB The Show 24.
