= Claire Atherton =

American film editor

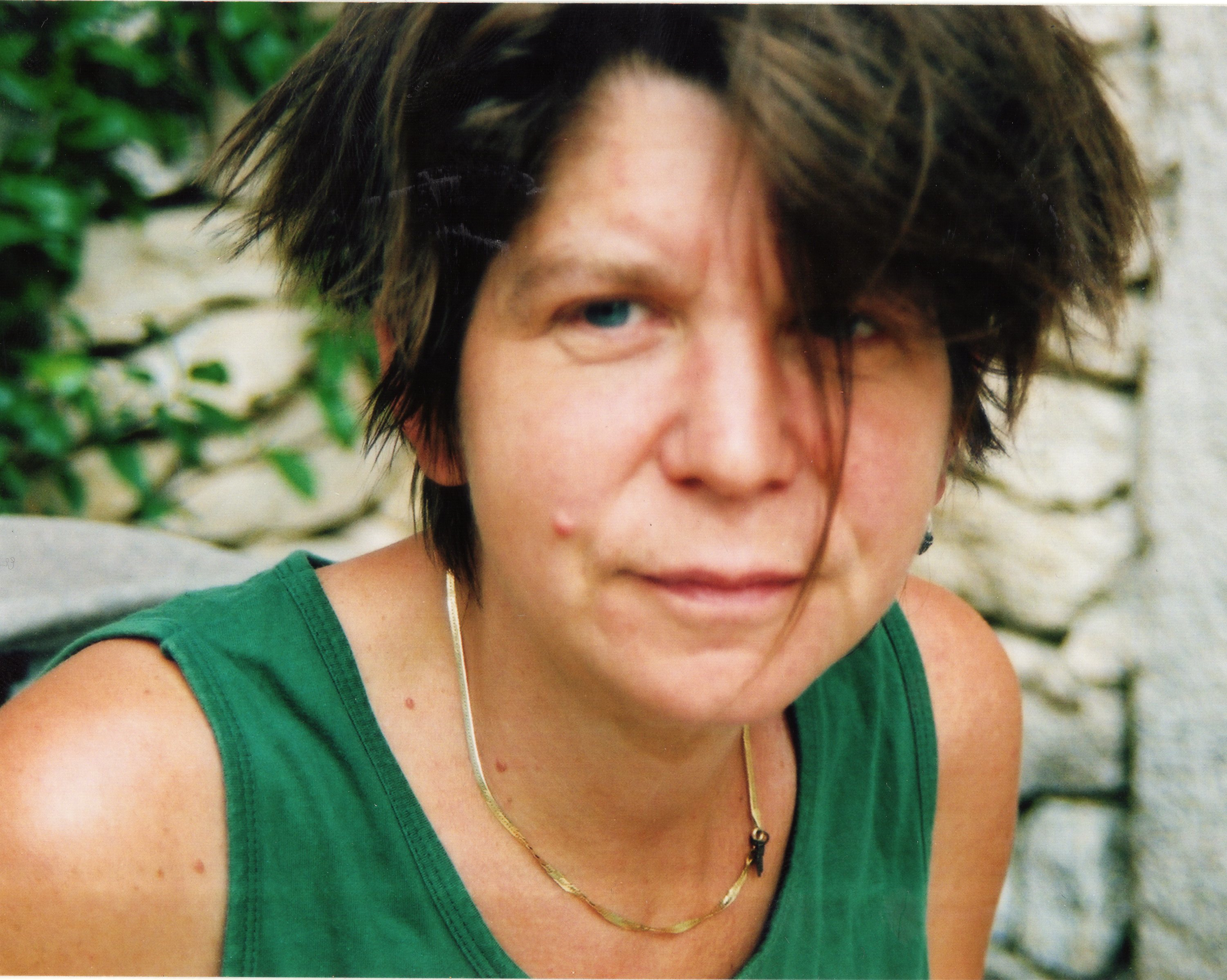
- Claire Atherton in 2005
- Born: 1963 (age 62–63); San Francisco, US
- Education: Institut national des langues et civilisations orientales, Paris Institute of Foreign Language, Beijing École nationale supérieure Louis-Lumière, Paris
- Occupations: Film editor, conception of video installations
- Awards: Vision Award Ticinomoda 2019

Claire Atherton is a film editor who was a close collaborator of Chantal Akerman since the mid-1980s. Over the years, she has also worked with a wide range of international filmmakers. In 2019, she was honored with the Vision Award Ticinomoda at the 72nd Locarno International Film Festival, becoming the first woman to receive this distinction.

== Biography ==
=== Early life and education ===
Born in 1963 in San Francisco, U.S., Atherton grew up in New York and later in Paris. She now lives and works in France. Her parents are Ioana Wieder, a French filmmaker of Romanian Jewish origin, and John Atherton, an American academic. Her sister is the cellist Sonia Wieder-Atherton.

Drawn early on to Taoist philosophy and Chinese ideograms, she spent several months in China in 1980, studying at the Institute of Foreign Languages in Beijing. Upon returning to France, she enrolled at the National Institute for Oriental Languages and Civilizations in Paris.

Her first professional experience came in 1982 at the Centre Audiovisuel Simone de Beauvoir in Paris, where she worked as a video technician. In 1984, she entered the professional program at the École Nationale Supérieure Louis-Lumière in Paris, graduating in 1986. Soon after, she began working with both sound and image, collaborating notably with Delphine Seyrig and Carole Roussopoulos on projects for the Centre Simone de Beauvoir, among others. From the 1990s onwards, her focus shifted primarily to film editing.

=== Encounter and collaboration with Chantal Akerman ===
Claire Atherton met Chantal Akerman in 1984 during the stage adaptation of Letters Home: Correspondence 1950-1963 by Sylvia Plath, performed by Delphine Seyrig at the Théâtre Moderne de Paris. At the time, Seyrig—then President of the Centre Audiovisuel Simone de Beauvoir—invited Akerman and Atherton to film the production.

"I quickly sensed, when we began editing, that it would be the beginning of a long story between Claire and me," Akerman later recalled.

That encounter marked the start of a creative partnership that would span over three decades. In 2007, Chantal Akerman spoke openly about the deep creative connection she shared with Claire Atherton in the editing room:

"We're in such osmosis that sometimes we don't even need to talk to each other. (...) For example, a shot—the length of a shot. We look at it and both tap the table at the same moment: we see the same things, we know when to stop. (...) There's nothing logical about the length of a shot. It's all about feeling. And it's a miracle to find someone who feels the way you do."

Their collaboration extended beyond cinema into the realm of video installations, a medium Akerman began exploring in 1995. Atherton played a central role in shaping these works, helping to develop an editing approach that was "not only temporal but also spatial". Today, she continues to oversee the conception and spatial design of Chantal Akerman’s installations, which are still exhibited in France and internationally.

Atherton contributed to nearly all of Akerman’s major works—documentaries, fiction films, and installations—up until No Home Movie and NOW, the latter presented at the 2015 Venice Biennale in 2015.

On November 16, 2015, ahead of the premiere of No Home Movie at the Cinémathèque française in Paris, Atherton paid tribute to her late collaborator by reading a personal text she had written in Akerman’s honor.

=== Film editing: fiction, documentaries, video installations ===
In addition to her long-standing collaboration with Chantal Akerman, Claire Atherton has worked with a wide range of filmmakers and artists, both in France and internationally. Since the 1980s, she has edited more than 80 works—including short and feature films, art films, experimental pieces, documentaries, and video installations—spanning projects from cinema to contemporary art exhibitions.

In 2000, she met Luc Decaster for the editing of Rêve d’usine, and has edited all his films since.

In 2023, Noëlle Pujol spoke about their regular collaboration since 2007:

"Claire Atherton edits fiction films, documentaries and video installations. That’s why I wanted to work with her. We’ve been working together since 2007. Claire often compares the act of editing to that of sculpting. Far from using images and sounds to serve a message, she listens to them and shapes them to give birth to the film. Claire places questioning and movement at the heart of her work. She is not so much interested in providing answers as in asking questions to keep cinema alive."

After the death of Chantal Akerman, she met Éric Baudelaire, an artist and filmmaker with whom she began a particularly rich collaboration starting in 2015. From then on, she became the editor of all his films, and it was with her that he began creating his first video installations.

Among some of the other projects she has worked on are Mafrouza, a multi-part documentary by Emmanuelle Demoris for which she edited the segments Cœur and Oh la nuit in 2007, and Au Monde by Christophe Bisson in 2013. More recently, in 2023, Atherton edited Man in Black, a film by Wang Bing selected for the Official Competition at the Cannes Film Festival. She also worked on The Vanishing Point by Bani Khoshnoudi, which received the Burning Lights Competition Award at the Visions du Réel Festival (Nyon International Film Festival) in 2025.

=== Work beyond editing ===
Atherton is regularly invited to lead masterclasses and workshops for emerging filmmakers, both in France and internationally, at institutions such as La Fémis (Paris), HEAD – Haute école d'art et de design (Geneva), Elías Querejeta Zine Eskola (San Sebastián) or EICTV—La Escuela Internacional de Cine y TV (San Antonio de Los Baños, Cuba). She frequently contributes essays published in specialized books and occasionally online. Her essay “The Art of Editing” is featured in the anthology Montage, co-published by HEAD and MAMCO.

In November 2023, she was invited to curate an exhibition of works by Chantal Akerman at La Virreina Centre de la Imatge in Barcelona. Facing The Image, her first curatorial project, was later presented at Artium Museoa in Vitoria-Gasteiz in May 2025.’

=== Commitment to Feminism ===
In the late 1970s, she took part in the collective Les Répondeuses (1977–1984), which broadcast a daily feminist news bulletin via a telephone answering machine, based on messages left on a dedicated phone line. The messages included practical information such as meeting schedules and drop-in hours at feminist support centers and advocacy organizations, calls for demonstrations, classified ads, or testimonies from women who had experienced violence.

In 1982, she participated in the creation of the Centre Audiovisuel Simone de Beauvoir, “a feminist audiovisual center for archiving and production,” chaired by Delphine Seyrig. She served as the Centre’s technical video manager, overseeing equipment maintenance, copy management, and format transfers. She contributed to the Centre’s productions, accompanied filmmakers on shoots—particularly Carole Roussopoulos—handled sound recording, and began working as a film editor. She also led introductory video workshops for women. In 1985, she co-directed a self-portrait of the Centre with Fani Adam and Nadja Ringart.

=== Recognition ===
In 2013, her work has been honoured with a comprehensive retrospective at the Grenoble Cinémathèque (France) — an unprecedented tribute to the body of work of an editor.

In 2019, Atherton was awarded the Vision Award Ticinomoda at the 72nd Locarno International Film Festival,’ becoming the first woman to receive the honor. Since its inception in 2013, the award "both highlights and pays tribute to someone whose creative work behind the scenes, as well as in their own right, has contributed to opening up new perspectives in film".

== Filmography ==
=== Films (editing) ===
- 1984: Le Centre Flora Tristan by Hélène Bourgault
- 1986: Letters Home by Chantal Akerman
- 1986: Rue Mallet-Stevens by Chantal Akerman
- 1986: Le Marteau [The Hammer] by Chantal Akerman
- 1989: Marguerite Paradis by Chantal Akerman
- 1992: Igor by Jean-François Gallotte
- 1992: Le cinéma est mort vive le cinéma by Emilio Pacull
- 1993: D'Est [From the East] by Chantal Akerman
- 1993: Les Profiteroles, couples mixtes à Cuba by Emilio Pacull
- 1994: Le Gamelan by Alain Jomy
- 1994: Les Colonnes d'Hercule d'Emilio Pacull
- 1994: Le Cinéma européen by Emilio Pacull
- 1996: Un divan à New York [A couch in New York] by Chantal Akerman
- 1996: Chantal Akerman par Chantal Akerman, in the collection "Cinéma de notre temps"
- 1996: Les Collèges en Seine Saint-Denis by Emilio Pacull
- 1997: Héros désarmés by Béatrice Kordon and Sylvie Ballyot
- 1997: Le jour où... by Chantal Akerman
- 1997: Ouganda, l'enfance kidnappée by Emilio Pacull
- 1997: L'Épousée by Françoise Grandcolin
- 1998: Emma, tribu kanak d'aujourd'hui by Emilio Pacull
- 1999: Sud [South] by Chantal Akerman
- 1999: Km 250 by Anne Faisandier
- 2000: La Captive by Chantal Akerman
- 2001: Rêve d'usine by Luc Decaster
- 2001: Filles de nos mères by Séverine Mathieu
- 2002: De l'autre côté [From the Other Side] by Chantal Akerman
- 2002: Avec Sonia Wieder-Atherton by Chantal Akerman
- 2003: Demain on déménage by Chantal Akerman
- 2004: Opération Hollywood by Emilio Pacull
- 2004: Autour d'hier, aujourd'hui et demain by Chantal Akerman
- 2005: Là-bas by Chantal Akerman
- 2005: Héros fragiles by Emilio Pacull
- 2006: Portrait de Pascale, menuisière by Séverine Mathieu
- 2006: Rien n'a été fait by Noëlle Pujol and Ludovic Burel
- 2006: Du sucre et des fleurs dans nos moteurs by Jean-Michel Rodrigo
- 2007: Entretiens avec Babette Mangolte, Natalia Akerman, Aurore Clément, DVD set « Chantal Akerman les années 70 »
- 2007: Mafrouza « Cœur », « Oh la nuit » by Emmanuelle Demoris
- 2008: Mr President by Emilio Pacull
- 2008: L'Écume des mères by Séverine Mathieu
- 2008: Tous les enfants sauf un by Noëlle Pujol and Andreas Bolm
- 2008: Fantaisie pour un château d'eau by Noëlle Pujol
- 2008: A l'Est avec Sonia Wieder-Atherton by Chantal Akerman
- 2009: Tombée de nuit sur Shanghai [Falling Night in Shanghai] by Chantal Akerman
- 2009: Petites Histoires de mères by Séverine Mathieu
- 2009: Dieu nous a pas fait naître avec des papiers by Luc Decaster
- 2009: Ceux de Primo Levi by Anne Barbé
- 2010: Histoire racontée par Jean Dougnac by Noëlle Pujol
- 2010: Sorcières mes sœurs by Camille Ducellier
- 2010: Detroit ville sauvage by Florent Tillon
- 2010: On est là by Luc Decaster
- 2011: La vie est ailleurs [Life is on the Other Side] by Elsa Quinette
- 2011: La Folie Almayer [Almayer's Folly] by Chantal Akerman
- 2011: Die Wiedergänger [The Revenants] by Andreas Bolm
- 2011: Avenue Rivadavia by Christine Seghezzi
- 2012: Noctambules by Ilham Maad
- 2012: Video design for La Jungle des villes by Bertolt Brecht (Roger Vontobel)
- 2012: Hungry Man by Philippe Martin
- 2013: Au monde by Christophe Bisson
- 2013: Effacée by Anna Feillou
- 2013: Si j'existe je ne suis pas un autre by Marie Violaine Brincard and Olivier Dury
- 2014: Qui a tué Ali Ziri ? by Luc Decaster
- 2014: Histoires de la plaine by Christine Seghezzi
- 2015: No Home Movie by Chantal Akerman
- 2015: Aux Capucins by Anna Feillou
- 2016: Jumbo Toto histoires d'un éléphant by Noëlle Pujol
- 2016: Le Juge by Andreas Bolm
- 2016: Silêncio by Christophe Bisson
- 2016: Danse avec l'écume by Luc Decaster
- 2017: Also Known As Jihadi by Éric Baudelaire
- 2018: Walked the Way Home by Éric Baudelaire
- 2018: Les cavaliers fantômes by Christine Seghezzi
- 2018: Altérations / Kô Murobushi by Basile Doganis
- 2019: Un film dramatique by Éric Baudelaire
- 2020: The Glove (short film) by Éric Baudelaire
- 2020: Le chant des oubliés by Luc Decaster
- 2021: When There Is No More Music to Write by Éric Baudelaire
- 2021: Une Fleur à la Bouche [A Flower in the Mouth] by Éric Baudelaire
- 2020: Les lettres de Didier [Didier's Letters] by Noëlle Pujol
- 2022: Un souvenir d'archives by Christophe Bisson
- 2022: Intermède by Maria Kourkouta
- 2023: Man in Black by Wang Bing (Cannes Film Festival, Official Selection 2023)
- 2024: Fogo do Vento by Marta Mateus
- 2024: Sob a chama da candeia by André Gil Mata
- 2025: Regarde avec mes yeux et donne-moi les tiens [Look Through My Eyes and Give Me Your Own] by Noëlle Pujol
- 2025: The Vanishing Point by Bani Khoshnoudi

=== Films (photography) ===
- 1986: Femmes et Musique, production of Centre audiovisuel Simone de Beauvoir (first assistant camera)
- 1986: Rue Mallet-Stevens by Chantal Akerman (director of photography)
- 1986: Le Marteau by Chantal Akerman (director of photography)
- 1988: Histoires d'Amérique by Chantal Akerman (first assistant camera)
- 1988: L'institut du monde Arabe (first assistant camera)
- 1988: Marguerite Paradis by Chantal Akerman (director of photography)
- 1988: Notes pour Debussy by Jean-Patrick Lebel (first assistant camera)
- 1990: Igor by Jean-François Gallotte (director of photography)
- 2007: Entretiens avec Babette Mangolte, Natalia Akerman, Aurore Clément, DVD set « Chantal Akerman les années 70 »

=== Installations (editing and spatial design) ===
- 1995 : D’Est, au bord de la fiction by Chantal Akerman
- 1995 : Le 25e écran by Chantal Akerman
- 1998 : Selfportrait / Autobiography: A Work in Progress by Chantal Akerman
- 2001 : Woman Sitting After Killing by Chantal Akerman
- 2002 : From the Other Side by Chantal Akerman
- 2002 : A voice in the Desert by Chantal Akerman
- 2003 : From the Other Side, Fragment by Chantal Akerman
- 2004 : Marcher à côté de ses lacets dans un frigidaire vide by Chantal Akerman
- 2007 : La Chambre by Chantal Akerman
- 2007 : Je tu il elle by Chantal Akerman
- 2007 : In the Mirror by Chantal Akerman
- 2008 : Femmes d’Anvers en Novembre by Chantal Akerman
- 2008 : Décor vidéo de Chantal Akerman pour I am a mistake de Jan Fabre
- 2009 : Maniac Summer by Chantal Akerman
- 2009 : Tombée de nuit sur Shanghai by Chantal Akerman
- 2012 : Maniac Shadows by Chantal Akerman
- 2010 : My Mother Laughs, Prelude by Chantal Akerman
- 2014 : De la mèr(e) au désert by Chantal Akerman
- 2015 : NOW, Chantal Akerman by Chantal Akerman
- 2019 : Tu peux prendre ton temps by Éric Baudelaire
- 2021 : This Flower in My Mouth by Éric Baudelaire

== See also ==
=== Published texts ===
- 2015: Tribute to Chantal Akerman.

A text written and read by Claire Atherton during the tribute to Chantal Akerman at the Cinémathèque française in Paris on November 16, 2015, before the premiere of No Home Movie. An English translation by Felicity Chaplin was published online in 2020 by the journal Sabzian. The piece also appeared in the Senses of Cinema issue "Chantal Akerman: An Intimate Passion” and in Camera Obscura: Feminism, Culture, and Media Studies. The text was also featured as an installation in the exhibition Facing the Image in 2023 at La Virreina Centre de la Imatge in Barcelona and in 2025 at Artium Museoa in Vitoria-Gasteiz.

- 2018: The Art of Editing.

In May 2025, Basque, Spanish, and English versions of the original text were published on AMAonline (the digital editorial platform of Artium Museoa). In November 2025, the English version, illustrated with additional images, was published on e-flux.

- 2018: Can we be in touch with what is?

This text was originally written for the publication of What is Real? Filmmakers weigh in (2018), a bilingual, illustrated volume, published to mark the 40th anniversary of the Cinéma du Réel festival and edited by Andréa Picard. It was later published online in 2020 by the journal Sabzian.

- 2019: Living Matter.

An English translation by Nicholas Elliott appeared in the Summer 2019 issue of BOMB Magazine and was also published online in 2020 by the journal Sabzian. Excerpts from the text were featured under the title “About D’Est. Editing Chantal Akerman’s Film” on Versopolis, November 4, 2019.

=== Interviews ===
- 2016: 'Interview with Tina Poglajen', Film Comment.
- 2017: 'Our Way of Working: A Conversation with Claire Atherton about Chantal Akerman', interview with Ivone Margulies, Camera Obscura n°100, pp 13–28.
- 2018: 'A conversation with Claire Atherton', by Roger Crittenden, Fine Cuts: Interview on the Practice of European Film Editing, New-York: Routledge, 2018.
- 2019: 'On Chantal Akerman', News From Home: The Films of Chantal Akerman (catalogue published on the occasion of Akeman's retrospective organized as part of the Toronto International Film Festival).
- 2019: 'The Art of Living', interview with Yaniya Lee, canadianart, 1er mars 2019.
- 2019: 'Listening to Images: A conversation with Editor Claire Atherton’, Laura Davis, Mubi notebook.
- 2019: '"Not Knowing Where You're Going": How Claire Atherton Edits Movies', Justine Smith, Hyperallergic.
- 2019: 'Life needs editing', Lorenzo Buccella, News from the Locarno Festival (web).
- 2023 : 'Conversation between Claire Atherton and Valentín Roma', at La Virreina in Barcelona on the occasion of the exhibition Facing the Image.

=== Talks and Masterclasses (in English / Spanish) ===
- 2016: "Editing, A Composition", Jihlava International Film Festival
- 2016: "The Art of Editing": Tel Aviv International Student Films Festival
- 2016: "Introduction to the screening of Akerman’s «Là bas»", C. Akerman International Symposium, Basel
- 2017: "Fluidity of Identity : Conference with Rania Stefan", Art Basel
- 2018: "Das Kino von Chantal Akerman", Frankfurt Univ., Masterclass/presentation of D'est by C. Akerman
- 2020: "Spatializing Cinema", Eye Museum, Amsterdam
- 2020: ''Interview Claire Atherton by Anna Abraham », about the exhibition Chantal Akerman – Passages, Eye Museum, Amsterdam
- 2021: "Claire Atherton: Editing, a composition", Thessaloniki International Film Festival, Focus "The Art of Editing"
- 2023: "Claire Atherton, Diàlegs amb una montadora", Dones Visuals, Barcelone (Spanish)
- 2024: "Chantal Akerman: encarar la imagen", Filmtopia (English with Spanish subtitles)
