= Là-bas =

Là-bas may refer to:

- Là-bas (novel), 1891 novel by French writer Joris-Karl Huysmans
- "Là-bas" (song), 1987 song by Jean-Jacques Goldman
- Là-bas (film), 2006 documentary film by director Chantal Akerman

== See also ==
- "Il doit faire beau là-bas", French entry in the Eurovision Song Contest 1967, performed by Noëlle Cordier
