= Sois belle et tais-toi =

Sois belle et tais-toi may refer to:

- Sois belle et tais-toi (1958 film), a film by French director Marc Allégret, known as Be Beautiful But Shut Up in the US and Blonde for Danger in the U.K.
- Sois belle et tais-toi (1981 film), a documentary film by French actress and director Delphine Seyrig
- "Sois belle et tais-toi!" (literally: "Be beautiful and be quiet!"), the French name for the episode "The President Wore Pearls" of The Simpsons (season 15)
- "Sois belle et tais-toi!" a 1959 song written and composed by Serge Gainsbourg
