= Portrait of a Young Girl at the End of the 60s in Brussels =

1994 film by Chantal Akerman

- Written by: Chantal Akerman
- Directed by: Chantal Akerman
- Starring: Circe Lethem; Julien Rassam
- Country of origin: France
- Original language: French

Production
- Cinematography: Raymond Fromont
- Editor: Martine Lebon
- Running time: 63 mins
- Production companies: Arte; Sony Music Entertainment

Original release
- Network: Arte
- Release: 4 November 1994

Portrait of a Young Girl at the End of the 60s in Brussels (French: Portrait d'une jeune fille de la fin des années 60 à Bruxelles) is a 1994 television film by Belgian feminist and avant-garde filmmaker Chantal Akerman. It is a semi-autobiographical coming-of-age story with feminist and LGBT themes.

The film was created for Arte's nine-part series Tous les garcons et les filles de leur âge (All the Boys and Girls of Their Age). The series, which belongs to le jeune cinéma français (the Young French Cinema) movement of the 1990s, has been described as "'enormously influential" by the British Film Institute's Sight & Sound magazine.

== Plot ==
The film follows 15-year-old Michele (Circe Lethem), her best friend Danielle (Joelle Marlier), and the army deserter Paul (Julien Rassam) in Brussels, April 1968. After dropping out of school one day, Michele meets Paul at the cinema, and they kiss. Afterwards, they wander the streets, discussing love, sexuality, politics and philosophy. Michele reveals to Paul that she kissed him to tell someone else about it, and make them "suffer". Later, she leaves Paul to meet with her friend Danielle, to whom she tells the story of kissing him. Danielle remarks that Michele is in a strange mood. They make plans to go to a party together that night, and Michele returns to Paul. They resume their wandering around Brussels. Having originally claimed to be in Brussels to meet a lover, Paul eventually reveals that he has deserted the army. He and Michele have her first sexual encounter after dancing together to Suzanne at her cousin's empty apartment.

By the end of their day together, Michele has decided that Paul would be a better match for Danielle. They make plans to meet later in the evening, after Danielle and Michele attend the party. At the party, Michele and Danielle dance together in the middle of a dance circle to La Bamba. Danielle moves to the outside of the circle, and Michele is supposed to choose a new partner to bring inside the ring. Instead, she chooses Danielle again. When the song changes and the circle breaks apart, Danielle dances closely with a boy, and Michele watches with an expression of yearning. She leaves the party and Danielle follows her outside. The film ends with Danielle and Michele walking away from the party, holding hands, to meet with Paul. As they approach him, Danielle continues alone presumably towards him, while Michele turns back on her own.

== Cast ==
- Circe Lethem as Michele
- Joelle Marlier as Danielle
- Julien Rassam as Paul
- Cynthia Rodberg as Mireille

== Production ==
Portrait of a Young Girl was one of nine films commissioned by Arte for its series Tous les garcons et les filles de leur âge. The series also includes works by André Téchiné, Olivier Assayas, Claire Denis, Olivier Dahan, Émilie Deleuze, Laurence Ferreira Barbosa, Cédric Kahn and Patricia Mazuy. Three of the films in the series later received expanded theatrical releases: Assayas' Cold Water, Kahn's Trop de bonheur and Téchiné's Wild Reeds.

Certain elements were required of all the films in the series: adolescence as a subject matter, the inclusion of popular songs from the filmmakers' youth, and a party scene. The films are autobiographical or semi-autobiographical in nature. This is reflected in Portrait of a Young Girl's casting: film scholar Patricia White suggests that protagonist Michelle is a stand-in of-sorts for Akerman, noting that Circe Lethem physically resembles a young Akerman "in stance and presence."

=== Music ===
Portrait of a Young Girl makes prominent use of diegetic music, with the songs of the 60s featuring in dance and party scenes. Songs featured in Portrait of a Young Girl include:

- Suzanne, written and performed by Leonard Cohen
- It's a Man's Man's Man's World, written and performed by James Brown
- La Bamba (song), performed by Trini Lopez
- Noir, C'est Noir, performed by Johnny Hallyday

== Cinematic style ==
=== Anachronisms ===
The film is set 25 years in the past but contains undisguised anachronisms, like modern cars on the streets of Brussels and contemporary CD stores. According to Variety critic David Rooney, the film "thumbs [its] nose at period authenticity." New Yorker critic Richard Brody states that these anachronisms "mark the contemporary world with the buried feelings of [Akerman's] youth, as if to prove Faulkner's dictum, 'The past is not dead. In fact, it's not even past.'' French cinema scholar Nicoleta Bazgan states that the film's refusal of period authenticity has thematic resonances, stating that it has the effect of destabilising "dichotomies such as private and public, authentic and clichèd, past and present."

=== Relationship to French New Wave ===
Nicoleta Bazgan states that Portrait of a Young Girl exists in "direct conversation" with the French New Wave cinematic movement of the 1950s and 60s. Both the film's settings - "record stores, bookstores, cafes and restaurants" - and cinematic style - the "use of authentic urban settings without any extras and iconic jump cuts" - are reminiscent of New Wave films. However, Bazgan also sees the film's emphasis upon its young heroine's emotional fragility and subjectivity as a departure from the New Wave, whose (typically male) protagonists are cool, dispassionate and detached. According to Bazgan, by ''emphasising ... the haptic and emotional quality of [Michelle's] journey, and the focus on emphatic connection, Akerman deviates, in a fundamental way, from the aesthetic codes of the New Wave she is revisiting."

Feminist film scholar Patricia White also suggests that Portrait of a Young Girl is addressing the French New Wave. She writes that the film's setting, Brussels, April 1968, calls to mind the Paris, May 68 worker-student strikes, which "function as a mythical origin story in the narratives of the new left, Post-structuralist theory and film culture." By "virtue of being not quite Paris, not yet May," White says, Portrait of a Young Girl suggests that its story is "not given meaning by the heroic (male) politics that would require historical authenticity."

== Themes ==
=== LGBT themes ===
French film scholar Judith Mayne sums up Portrait of a Young Girl as an adolescent Coming out narrative, where the heterosexual romance between Paul and Michelle is a "pretext" for the relationship between Michelle and Danielle. As a teenage girl, says Mayne, Michelle is expected to abide by "the conventions and codes of heterosexuality," but is only performing heterosexual desire for Danielle's benefit. Paradoxically, says Mayne, sharing in the language of heterosexuality, or "girl talk," [156] is how Michelle relates to her friend and homosexual love interest. In her analysis, Mayne also compares the heteronormative pressures of girlhood to those of mainstream cinema: Michelle's "desire to desire" a conventional heterosexual romance, writes Mayne, is comparable to "the woman's simultaneous exclusion from, yet desire to participate in, the narrative and scopic regimes of the classical Hollywood cinema."

==== Portrait of a Young Girl as minor cinema ====
Feminist film scholar Patricia White cites Portrait of a Young Girl as an example of Gilles Deleuze and Félix Guattari's "minor literature:" literature which "doesn't come from a minor language; it is rather that which a minority constructs within a major language." White writes that "queer experimental cinema's challenge to majoritarian film language, narrative patterns and conditions of production" makes it a "minor" cinema. She states that Portrait of a Young Girl is characterised by a sparseness or "poverty" – evident in its plain language, uneventful plot and simple sets – which "deflect[s] audience demand for familiar stories, happy endings, repeatable pleasures, identity assurances."

=== Feminist themes ===
French cinema scholar Nicoleta Bazgan writes that Portrait of a Young Girl represents a feminist urban geography. She explains that feminist geographers encourage "incorporating emotion and the body" into the study of geography. By highlighting "the connection between Michelle and the urban space through which she travels," writes Bazgan, Akerman mirrors ideas like Donna Haraway's theory of Situated Knowledges. This theory states that knowledge cannot be wholly objective or neutral: instead, all knowledge is necessarily "situated" in a particular context, space, body or point of view. By showing viewers the city of Brussels through Michelle's eyes, Bazgan writes, the film "reflects the contemporary emphasis on female subjectivity, connection between body and space, exterior and interior, and haptic visuality."

== Relationships to other Akerman films ==
=== Saut ma Ville (1968) ===
Film scholar Patricia White links Portrait of a Young Girl to Akerman's debut short film, Saut ma Ville (English: Blow Up My Town), calling the former film a "kind of remake" of the latter. According to White, both films share a common setting and an autobiographical remit. In Saut ma Ville, Akerman appears as a "manic young woman" who deliberately blows up herself and her apartment. White states that Portrait of a Young Girl is a "less fatalistic revision of that first portrait [Saut ma Ville] of a young girl at the end of the 1960s in Brussels."

=== Je Tu Il Elle (1974) ===
White also connects Portrait of a Young Girl to Akerman's 1974 feature film Je Tu Il Elle. "With its lovesick lesbian protagonist," she writes, Portrait of a Young Girl is "a (less sexually explicit) revision of Je Tu Il Elle, made when Akerman was in her early twenties." White states that Je Tu Il Elle features Akerman in an explicit and "still remarkable lesbian sex scene," about which the director has said: "When I did it... I didn't have a relation with the public ... I wouldn't dare do that again. I was completely unaware of how strong it would appear." According to White, "Portrait of a Young Girl finds a way to 'do it again,' but differently." She writes that Michelle's adolescent yearning for Danielle offers another mode of "'strong' lesbian representation."

Film scholar Maureen Turin also relates Portrait of a Young Girl to Akerman's 1974 film, classifying both films as "personal pronouncements" which "conjoin autobiography and enunciation to point towards a revelation of the intimate." According to Turin, both films appear to read as Akerman speaking in the first person, whilst resisting the straightforward classification of autobiography.

== Reception and influence ==
At the time of its release, David Rooney of Variety called the film a work "of surprising subtlety, intimacy and economy" and praised the actors performances. He stated that Circe Lethem's Michelle was played with "effortless precision," her "youthful coolness" balanced "with unstoppable sincerity and a melancholy undertow." French film magazine Cahiers du cinéma also wrote that Akerman's film was a "priority" amongst the "unique" films in the Arte series.

Portrait of a Young Girl has been revisited at international film festivals and retrospectives of Akerman's work. It was screened at the Museum of Modern Art in 2008 and Toronto International Film Festival in 2019. In response to the screening at the Museum of Modern Art, Dave McDougall wrote for Mubi that the film "moves beyond being one of the great coming-of-age films; it is simply one of the great films. A moving, multifaceted, and magical hour, presented with honesty and subtle artistry." Similarly, Richard Brody of The New Yorker has praised the film, stating that its final scene "'searingly recalls the mingled ecstasies and bewilderments of youth, the sudden chill of loneliness in a crowd that is the curse and the pride of a sensitive, yearning soul." Patricia White also praised the film's final sequence, stating that "not since Max Ophüls's films has la ronde or the relay of desire and lack been so dizzyingly or economically rendered."

Writing about the Arte series as a whole, Ginette Vincendeau of Sight & Sound has called Tous les garcons et les filles de leur âge (All the Boys and Girls of Their Age) a "landmark" work. According to Vincendeau, Tous les garcons et les filles was "extremely influential" on le jeune cinéma français (the Young French Cinema) movement of the 1990s. Vincendeau divides le jeune cinéma français into two broad trends: autobiographical works "descended from the New Wave ethos of a cinema ‘in the first person,’" and works taking a "political turn." Young French Cinema of the autobiographical variety, Vincendeau writes, was "epitomised – and encouraged – by the Arte series."
