= News from Home =

1976 film by Chantal Akerman

- Promotional release poster
- Directed by: Chantal Akerman
- Written by: Chantal Akerman
- Based on: Letters by Natalia Akerman
- Produced by: Alain Dahan
- Starring: Chantal Akerman
- Cinematography: Babette Mangolte; Jim Asbell
- Edited by: Francine Sandberg
- Production companies: Institut national de l'audiovisuel; Paradise Films; Unité Trois; ZDF
- Release dates: 1976; 8 June 1977 (France)
- Running time: 88 minutes
- Countries: France; Belgium
- Language: French

News from Home is a 1976 French-language avant-garde documentary film directed by Chantal Akerman. The film consists of long takes of locations in New York City set to Akerman's voice-over as she reads letters that her mother sent her between 1971 and 1973 when Akerman lived in the city. Despite being relatively obscure, it has been featured in both Sight and Sound's director's and critic's poll to determine the greatest films of all time.

== Production ==
In November 1971, at the age of 21, Belgian film director Chantal Akerman moved to New York City. There she took petty jobs, made films and befriended filmmakers such as Jonas Mekas and the cinematographer Babette Mangolte, who became one of her recurring collaborators. According to Akerman, she spent the period living "like a vagabond." Principal photography for News from Home took place in the summer of 1976, three years after Akerman had returned to Belgium and after she had achieved critical success with the 1975 film Jeanne Dielman, 23 quai du Commerce, 1080 Bruxelles. Locations chosen for News from Home correspond to the areas where Akerman used to take walks, which include the Times Square subway station and a long shot driving up Tenth Avenue from 30th to 49th Streets in Hell's Kitchen. Other scenes were filmed in Tribeca and on the Staten Island Ferry. The sound was not recorded along with the images, but was added later.

== Home media ==
News from Home was released on DVD in France through Carlotta Films on 18 April 2007. In 2010, The Criterion Collection released the film on DVD through its "Eclipse" series, as part of a set called Chantal Akerman in the Seventies. The set includes four feature films that Akerman directed in the 1970s as well as a number of short films. News from Home is included on the first disc of the set, called The New York Films.

On 23 January 2024, The Criterion Collection released News from Home, along with eight other works by Akerman, on Blu-ray as part of the box set Chantal Akerman Masterpieces (1968–1978).

== Reception ==
News from Home has been met with highly positive critical reception, especially for its depiction of alienation. The film has a 100% rating on Rotten Tomatoes, based on 8 reviews. In the Chicago Reader, Jonathan Rosenbaum called it "one of the best depictions of the alienation of exile that I know." As appreciation of Chantal Akerman's films increased, News from Home gained stature among critics.

In the 2022 Sight and Sound critic's poll, the film received 45 votes from critics and was ranked in 52nd place, tying with Ali: Fear Eats the Soul. In the 2022 Sight and Sound director's poll, the films received 10 votes from directors and was ranked in 72nd place, tying with Shoah, The Searchers, Modern Times, Touki Bouki, Sans Soleil, The Spirit of the Beehive, The Seventh Seal, The Red Shoes, Chinatown, Ikiru, L'Argent, The Conversation, Kes, A Separation, Salo, or the 120 Days of Sodom, Where is the Friends House, and A Brighter Summer Day.

On the website They Shoot Pictures Don't They, which aggregates film polls to determine the most acclaimed films of all time, News From Home is ranked at 207th place, before The Thing and after A City of Sadness.
