= Babette Mangolte =

French cinematographer and director

- Born: 1941 (age 84–85)
- Education: École Nationale de la Photographie et de la Cinematographie
- Known for: Cinematographer, film director
- Website: http://www.babettemangolte.org/

Babette Mangolte (born 1941) is a French cinematographer, film director, and photographer who has lived and worked in the United States since 1970.

== Life and career ==
Mangolte was born and raised in France and moved to New York City in 1970. She attended L'Ecole Nationale de la Photographie et de la Cinematographie, graduating in 1966. Her move to New York was prompted by a disillusionment with the French film industry's male dominated climate, and an interest in experimental works by American filmmakers such as Jonas Mekas and Stan Brakhage. In the 1970s she began documenting the performance works of notable choreographers such as Trisha Brown, Lucinda Childs, David Gordon, and Yvonne Rainer. During this time, she also collaborated with director Chantal Akerman. Together they made several films, the most notable of which are Jeanne Dielman, 23 quai du Commerce, 1080 Bruxelles (1975) and News from Home (1976). Mangolte shot her first feature, L'Automne, in 1970, which was directed by Marcel Hanoun.

Mangolte credits Dziga Vertov's Man with a Movie Camera (1929) as the film that made her decide to become a cinematographer.

Seeing the film several times between 1961 and 1964 led me to apply to film school, giving up on the predictability of an academic life in mathematics for a life of uncertainty and adventure. In the 1960s, women and film cameras just didn't mix and I was warned against pursuing my dream. But Utopia and joie de vivre were at the core of Man with a Movie Camera and I was unafraid.

— Babette Mangolte, "Life in Film: Babette Mangolte"

She is known for her experimental film-making, which is influenced by the French New Wave and Structural film. She has made many films of dancers and performance artists, along with several documentaries and narrative films. Her films include both short and feature length. One of her best-known films is Seven Easy Pieces, a documentary of the performance artist Marina Abramović. Her most recent film is Calamity Jane & Delphine Seyrig: A Story, which is a homage to the actress and her fascination for the book Calamity Jean's Letters to her Daughter.

She is a professor at the University of California, San Diego.

== Filmography ==
Directed, produced, photographed or edited by Babette Mangolte

- 1975 What Maisie Knew 58 min. 16mm B&W
- 1976 (Now) (Maintenant entre parentheses) 10 min. 16mm color
- 1977 The Camera: Je (La Camera: I) 88 min. 16mm Color
- 1978 Water Motor 9min. 16mm B&W - Choreography: Trisha Brown
- 1979 There? Where? 8min. 16mm Color
- 1980 The Cold Eye (My Darling be Careful) 90min. 16mm B&W
- 1982 The Sky on Location 78min. 16mm Color
- 1991 Visible Cities 31 min. 16mm Color
- 1993 Four Pieces by Morris 94 min. 16mm Color - Choreography: Robert Morris
- 1995-99 Dismantle (an essay on photography) 16mm Color in progress
- 2000 Homemade, 6 min. Super 8mm/Digi Beta Choreography: Trisha Brown
- 2003 Les Modèles de Pickpocket, 89 minutes Digi Beta PAL 16:9
- 2004 Roof and Fire Piece, 31 minutes, Choreography: Trisha Brown 1973, DVD, ArtPix
- 2007 Seven Easy Pieces by Marina Abaramović
- 2007 Yvonne Rainer's AG Indexical with a little help from H.M.
- 2008 Yvonne Rainer's RoS Indexical 2010 Slide Shoq
- 2012 Roof Piece on the High Line
- 2012 Patricia Patterson Paintings
- 2012 Edward Krasiński's Studio
- 2012 Homemade (choreography Trisha Brown, danced by Vicki Shick)
- 2013 Staging "Lateral Pass (Shot in 1985, Edited in 2013)
- 2014 Steve Paxton at Dia:Beacon
- 2014 Je, Nous, I or Eye, Us
- 2016 Work, Travail, Arbeid
- 2018 IDIR
- 2019/202 Calamity Jean & Delphine Seyrig: A Story

== Writings ==
- Selected Writings, 1998–2015, London: Sternberg Press 2018
