= Hanging Out Yonkers =

Hanging Out Yonkers is an unfinished 1973 Belgian-American documentary movie by Chantal Akerman.

The movie was shot at the request of a welfare organisation. It follows a rehabilitation program of juvenile delinquents. Akerman recorded many hours of interviews.
