= Les Rendez-vous d'Anna =

1978 film by Chantal Akerman

- French theatrical release poster
- Directed by: Chantal Akerman
- Written by: Chantal Akerman
- Produced by: Alain Dahan
- Starring: Aurore Clément; Jean-Pierre Cassel; Helmut Griem; Lea Massari; Magali Noël; Hanns Zischler
- Cinematography: Jean Penzer
- Edited by: Francine Sandberg
- Production companies: Hélène Films; Unité Trois; Paradise Films; ZDF
- Distributed by: Gaumont Distribution
- Release dates: 9 October 1978 (Festival du Film de Paris); 8 November 1978 (France)
- Running time: 127 minutes
- Countries: Belgium; France; West Germany
- Language: French

Les Rendez-vous d'Anna (known in English as The Meetings of Anna and Meetings with Anna) is a 1978 drama film written and directed by Chantal Akerman.

== Plot ==
Anne Silver, a Belgian filmmaker, is travelling through West Germany, Belgium, and France to promote her new film. Along the way she meets with strangers, friends, former lovers, and family members, all the while traversing an isolating and increasingly homogeneous Western Europe. Among the people she meets is her own mother, with whom she talks about falling in love with an Italian woman. At the end she is back in her apartment, listening to messages on her answering machine, alone as ever. The calls are from various friends and/or lovers, who express frustration at her unavailability, and also a manager who wants to make sure she shows up for all of her promotional appearances. The last message is from her female lover, who is wondering where she is. Anne does not call anyone back.

== Cast ==
- Aurore Clément as Anne Silver
- Jean-Pierre Cassel as Daniel
- Magali Noël as Ida
- Helmut Griem as Heinrich
- Hanns Zischler as Hans
- Lea Massari as Anne's mother

== Critical reception ==
The movie initially was not well received, though it has since risen in prestige. Many critics found fault with what they perceived as a "scaling-back of the stylistic and thematic radicalism" to be found in Akerman's Jeanne Dielman, 23 quai du Commerce, 1080 Bruxelles (1975). On the review aggregator website Rotten Tomatoes, the film holds an approval rating of 71% based on reviews from 7 critics, with an average rating of 8.0/10. It received the André Cavens Award for Best Film given by the Belgian Film Critics Association (UCC).
