= Dis-moi =

Dis-Moi
- Directed by: Chantal Akerman
- Written by: Chantal Akerman
- Produced by: Chantal Akerman
- Release date: 1980
- Running time: 45 minutes
- Country: France
- Language: French

Dis-moi ([di.mwa], "Tell Me") is a 1980 documentary film directed by Chantal Akerman. It was commissioned for French TV. Akerman interviews elderly ladies, who are Jewish survivors of the Holocaust.
