= Sophie Delaporte =

French visual artist, photographer and director

- Born: 1971 (age 54–55); France
- Education: École nationale supérieure Louis-Lumière; Paris VIII University; École du Louvre
- Known for: Fashion photography; Visual arts; Directing
- Notable work: Needlework; Nudes; Postmodern Mysteries
- Movement: Surrealism (influence), Postmodernism
- Awards: Grand Prix Photography and Sustainability (2019)
- Website: www.sophiedelaporte.com

Sophie Delaporte, born in 1971, is a French visual artist, photographer and director who began her career in the early 2000s by publishing her first fashion series in the British press, and especially in iD Magazine.

Noticed for her research around color and movement, Sophie Delaporte takes an early interest on the issue of women’s representation. She was invited in June 2019 for the Dora Maar exhibition by the centre Georges Pompidou in Paris, to take part in a « table ronde » about women’s place and inclusion in Art, and their representation in the women’s Press Magazine ( with Sacha Van Dorssen and Mathieu Meyer).

== Biography ==
After a scientific High School Diploma and mathematics studies at Jussieu, Sophie Delaporte passed the examination for l’École Nationale Supérieure Louis Lumière (ENSLL). Graduated from the ENSLL, Sophie Delaporte studied Photography History at Paris VIII University and at l’École du Louvre.

After graduating she moved to London and began working for the English press. Very soon Terry Jones, artistic director of i-D magazine, entrusted her with her first fashion series. (Fashion Now 2)

Her photos were exhibited as early as 2002 at the Marion Meyer Gallery during the Month of Photography in Paris (introduction text by Martin Harrison).

Franca Sozzani of Italian Vogue asked her to do her first beauty series (Water Therapy) for the magazine, with which she will collaborate regularly.

Her photographs appeared in magazines such as Vogue Italia, Uomo Vogue, Vogue Portugal, Vogue Deutschland, Vogue Turkey, Vogue Japan, I-D magazine, Another Magazine and Interview in the United States.

She collaborates with houses such as Hermès (Hermès Missy Rayder), Lancôme, Balenciaga, Courrèges (Eau Hyper Fraîche), John Galliano, Le Bon Marché or Astier de Villatte (Astier de Villatte, Lou Doillon).

Her work has been the subject of numerous solo exhibitions around the world, notably in New York (SLE Gallery in 2009, 2011 and 2016), Tokyo (at Gallery 21 in 2010) and London (Scream Gallery, 2008) and at many international fairs (such as Palm Beach Modern + Contemporary Art Fair, Miami in 2019 and 2020).

Historian and photography critic Vicki Goldberg wrote about her in September 2011, on the occasion of the Nudes exhibition in New York: “Sophie Delaporte is a French photographer who is on permanently good terms with fantasy and a cheerfully offbeat approach. She has a distinctive sense of color, a fabulist’s imagination, an edge of surrealism, and a knack for ambiguous narrative”.

Tim Newman asked her to think about a concept and to realize fifty small short films for France Télévision, about creation in France.

In March 2015, Sophie Delaporte exhibited “True Colors” at the Joseph Gallery, a set of videos and photographs dealing with issues such as air pollution and the presence of chemical dyes in the food industry with the performer Melissa Mourer Ordener. These videos were selected and shown at video Art festivals such as Les Instants Vidéos (Marseille) and the Traverse Video Festival at a screening that closed the festival at the Musée des Abattoirs in Toulouse.

In May 2016, Sophie Delaporte exhibited "Post Modern Mysteries" in New York at the SLE Gallery, accompanied by an Artist Talk with the American photography historian Vicki Goldberg.

Some of Sophie Delaporte’s photographs for Comme des Garçons appears in the book “Fashion Game Changers, Reinventing the 20th Century Silhouette”, published in May 2016 at Editions Bloomsbury and on the occasion of an exhibition at MoMU, Antwerp Museum early 2016.

In March 2018, Sophie Delaporte directed the Balenciaga SS 2018 Digital Campaign for which Demna Gvasalia proposes her to take over and continue a series inspired by the Land Art she made in the early 2000s for i-D magazine.

Invited for the third edition of the Fashion Forum in November 2018, Sophie Delaporte participates in the round table “France térritoire de créativité mondiale” next to Christelle Kocher, Kate Fishard, Isaac Reina, Olivier Verrièle and Floriane de Saint Pierre.

In June 2019, on the occasion of the Dora Maar exhibition, she was invited in June 2019 for the exhibition Dora Maar by the Centre Georges Pompidou, to take part in a round table on women’s place and inclusion in art, and on their representation in the women’s Press Magazine (with Sacha Van Dorssen and Mathieu Meyer).

The Grand Prix “Photography and Sustainability” organized by Paris Good Fashion and Eyes on Talents is awarded to her in November 2019 for her “Fragile Landscape” series, on the impact of the fashion industry on the environment and in particular water pollution by chemical dyes. Her photographs were shown on the gates of the Hotel de Ville de Paris, from 6 November to 3 December 2019, alongside to the other winners Andrew Nuding, Romain Roucoules, Kateryna Snizhko et Amir Tikriti.

== Exhibitions ==
- Grand Prix Photography and Sustainability, Hotel de Ville de Paris, rue de Rivoli, November 6 to December 5, 2019
- Art Miami 2019, Miami, December 2019
- Aipad Photography 2019, New York, April 2019
- Aipad Photography 2018, New York, April 2018
- Art Miami 2018, Miami, December 2018
- Post Modern Mysteries (solo show & Artist Talk with Vicki Goldberg), SLE Gallery, New York, May 2016
- Traverse Vidéo, Musée des Abattoires de Toulouse, April 2016
- True Colors, Galerie Joseph, March 2015
- "SFE TV party", 3 videos by Sophie Delaporte, Palais de Tokyo, Paris, Mars 2014.
- Border Body - Mixing Identities, Mediterraneo Centro Artistico, Almeria, Spain, February 2014
- Border Body - Mixing Identities, Palazzo Barone Ferrara, Bari, Italy, February 2014
- Context Art Miami, Sous Les Etoiles Gallery, December 2013
- "Mois de la photo", Espace Pierre Cardin, Paris (solo show), October 2012
- "Needlework", HPGRP gallery, NY (solo show), March 2012.
- "Nudes" Sous Les Etoiles Gallery, NY (solo show), 2011
- "Sophie Delaporte & Astier de Villatte", Paris (solo show), 2011
- "Early Fashion Work", Gallery 21, Tokyo, 2010
- "Sophie Delaporte & Astier de Villatte", HP, Tokyo (solo show), 2010
- A Shaded View On Fashion Film, Milan, 2010
- "Early Fashion Work", Sous Les Étoiles Gallery, New York (solo show), 2009
- "Needlework", Scream Gallery, London (solo show), 2008
- Work on Paper, Marion Meyer Gallery, New York, 2007 and in 2005
- "Who’s that girl ?", Vanina Holasek Gallery, New York (group show), 2006
- Start’05, international art fair, Strasbourg, France, 2005
- "The Abused Eye", Marion Meyer Gallery, Paris (solo show), 2004
- Art Chicago, USA, Marion Meyer Gallery, 2004
- Art Paris, Marion Meyer Gallery, 2003
- Le Mois de la Photo, Marion Meyer, Paris Gallery (solo show), 2002
- Biennale of Firenze, Italy, 1998
- Jeremy Scott at Colette, Paris (group show), 1997
- "50 years of la maison Saint Laurent”, NY (group show), 1997
- FPIM, Biaritz (group show), 1996
- FPIM, Carrousel du Louvre, Paris (group show), 1996

== Books ==
- Sophie Delaporte & Astier de Villatte edited by Astier de Villatte & HP France, 2010
- 100 Contemporary Fashion designers, directed by Terry Jones, Editions Tashen, ISBN 978-3-8365-1686-0
- FASHION NOW 2, directed by Terry Jones, Editions Taschen, 2005, p. 87, p. 495 ISBN 3-8228-4241-9
- FASHION NOW 1, directed by Terry Jones, Editions Taschen, 2003, p. 90, p. 138, p. 148, p. 206, p. 274, p. 462, p. 485, p. 548 ISBN 3-8228-2187-X
- Men in skirts, V&A publications, 2003, p. 116-117 ISBN 1-85177-340-1
- Mois de la photo à Paris, 2002, texte de Martin Harrison, p. 158-159, ISBN 2-914426-18-6
- Red, Editions Assouline, 2000, p. 75, 97, 129 ISBN 2-84323-221-X
- Strip, Editions Steidl, 1998, p. 20-21 ISBN 3-88243-548-8
