= No Home Movie =

2015 French-Belgian documentary film by Chantal Akerman

- Film poster
- Directed by: Chantal Akerman
- Written by: Chantal Akerman
- Produced by: Chantal Akerman; Patrick Quinet; Serge Zeitoun
- Starring: Chantal Akerman; Natalia Akerman
- Cinematography: Chantal Akerman
- Edited by: Claire Atherton
- Production companies: Liaison Cinématographique; Paradise Films
- Distributed by: Zeugma Films (France)
- Release dates: 10 August 2015 (Locarno); 24 February 2016 (France)
- Running time: 115 minutes
- Countries: France; Belgium
- Languages: French; Spanish; English

No Home Movie is a French-Belgian 2015 documentary film directed by Chantal Akerman, focusing on conversations between the filmmaker and her mother just months before her mother's death. The film premiered at the Locarno Film Festival on 10 August 2015. It is Akerman's last film before she died by suicide.

== Synopsis ==
The documentary consists of conversations in person and over Skype between Akerman and her mother, Natalia, who was a survivor of Auschwitz. Halfway through the film, Akerman cuts to a succession of traveling shots of a desert, which "cleave(s) the movie in two."

== Production ==
Filming ran for several months. Her mother died shortly after filming ended, at the age of 86, in April 2014. Akerman edited around forty hours' worth of footage to 115 minutes; she used small handheld cameras and her BlackBerry to film. "I think if I knew I was going to do this, I wouldn’t have dared to do it," she said. Akerman died on 5 October 2015 in Paris. Le Monde reported that she took her own life.

== Release ==
The film premiered in the United States at the New York Film Festival on 7 October 2015, where it was described as "an extremely intimate film but also one of great formal precision and beauty, one of the rare works of art that is both personal and universal, and as much a masterpiece as her 1975 career-defining Jeanne Dielman, 23, quai du Commerce, 1080 Bruxelles." One scene, in particular, where the two "sit at the kitchen table, eating potatoes that Ms. Akerman has prepared, telling her mother that even she, the peripatetic artist, has mastered a few domestic skills" is, one New York Times reviewer suggested, "a reference to a memorable potato-peeling scene" from Jeanne.
