= Les trois dernières sonates de Franz Schubert =

1989 film by Chantal Akerman

- Directed by: Chantal Akerman
- Written by: Chantal Akerman
- Release date: 1989
- Running time: 49 minutes
- Country: France
- Language: French

Les trois dernières sonates de Franz Schubert is a French 1989 documentary film directed by Chantal Akerman, focusing on Franz Schubert’s last three piano sonatas. In the movie pianist Alfred Brendel plays and talks on sonatas.
