= Vision Award (Locarno Film Festival) =

Life's work achievement award at the Locarno Film Festival

Vision Award Ticinomoda
- Awarded for: For creative work behind the scenes
- Country: Switzerland
- Presented by: Locarno International Film Festival
- First award: 2013
- Final award: 2025
- Currently held by: Milena Canonero

The Vision Award Ticinomoda (previously known as the Vision Award - Nescens) is awarded by the Locarno Film Festival to pay tribute to someone whose creative work behind the scenes, as well as in their own right, has contributed to opening up new perspectives in film. The inaugural award was bestowed on Douglas Trumbull in 2013. The award's name has changed over the years due to its awarding sponsor.

== Honorees ==
- 2013: Douglas Trumbull
- 2014: Garrett Brown
- 2015: Walter Murch
- 2016: Howard Shore
- 2017: Jose Luis Alcaine
- 2018: Kyle Cooper
- 2019: Claire Atherton
- 2020: Ryuichi Sakamoto
- 2021: Phil Tippett
- 2022: Laurie Anderson
- 2023: Pietro Scalia
- 2024: Ben Burtt
- 2025: Milena Canonero
- 2026: Rick Baker
