= Jeanne Dielman, 23 quai du Commerce, 1080 Bruxelles =

1975 film by Chantal Akerman

- Theatrical release poster
- Directed by: Chantal Akerman
- Written by: Chantal Akerman
- Produced by: Corinne Jénart; Evelyne Paul
- Starring: Delphine Seyrig; Jan Decorte; Henri Storck; Jacques Doniol-Valcroze; Yves Bical
- Cinematography: Babette Mangolte
- Edited by: Patricia Canino
- Production companies: Paradise Films; Unité Trois
- Distributed by: Olympic Films (France)
- Release dates: 22 May 1975 (Cannes); 21 January 1976 (France)
- Running time: 201 minutes
- Countries: Belgium; France
- Language: French
- Budget: $120,000

Jeanne Dielman, 23 quai du Commerce, 1080 Bruxelles (Note: French pronunciation: [ʒan dilman vɛ̃ntʁwɑ kɛ dy kɔmɛʁs milkatʁəvɛ̃ bʁysɛl], lit. "Jeanne Dielman, 23 Commerce Quay, 1080 Brussels", often referred to simply as Jeanne Dielman.) is a 1975 art film written and directed by Chantal Akerman, and starring Delphine Seyrig. Distinguished by its long takes, static camerawork, and slice-of-life depiction of domestic labor, the film follows the routine of a widowed mother (Seyrig) over three days.

Jeanne Dielman was shot over five weeks on location in Brussels, and financed through a $120,000 grant awarded by the Belgian government. It had its world premiere at the Directors' Fortnight section of the 1975 Cannes Film Festival on 22 May, and it was theatrically released in France on 21 January 1976, where it was met with polarized reviews.

In the following decades, Jeanne Dielman gained exposure and reappraisal alongside Akerman’s body of work, becoming a cult classic. Labelled as a feminist film and an early example of the slow cinema genre, it is now considered to be one of the greatest films ever made. In 2022, it placed first in the decennial critics' poll published by the British Film Institute's magazine Sight and Sound.

== Plot ==
Jeanne Dielman is a widowed woman living with her teenage son, Sylvain. Her days are filled with meticulous routine: cooking, cleaning, running errands, and taking care of her son. Their conversations are minimal, and their relationship appears distant but structured by habit.

Over the course of three afternoons, Jeanne receives a man in her home for a brief, silent sexual encounter. She hides the money that the men give her in a soup tureen, maintaining an almost ritualistic order to her life. Everything unfolds with quiet precision, reflecting her control over her environment.

After her second-day encounter, small disruptions begin to appear: overcooked potatoes, a dropped brush, an unbuttoned robe, a malfunctioning stamp machine. These seemingly minor hiccups in her routine signal an internal unraveling. Jeanne becomes increasingly unsettled, unable to maintain the precision that once defined her existence. (Note: According to Chantal Akerman, the disruptions occur because Jeanne had an orgasm, which disrupted her sense of order.)

On the final day, after a sexual encounter where she shows signs of emotional disturbance, Jeanne calmly stabs the client in the neck with a pair of scissors. She sits alone at the dining table, motionless, her blouse and hand stained with blood.

== Cast ==
- Delphine Seyrig as Jeanne Dielman
- Jan Decorte as Sylvain Dielman
- Henri Storck as the first client
- Jacques Doniol-Valcroze as the second client
- Yves Bical as the third client
- Chantal Akerman as the voice of a neighbour in the hallway

== Production ==
After establishing herself as a major film director in 1974 with Je, tu, il, elle, Akerman said that she "felt ready to make a feature with more money" and applied for a grant from the Belgian government for financial support, submitting a script that Jane Clarke described as portraying "a rigorous regimen [constructed] around food ... and routine bought sex in the afternoon". This script would only be the rough basis for Jeanne Dielman, 23 quai du Commerce, 1080 Bruxelles because after Akerman received the government grant of $120,000 ($717,996 in 2025) and began production, she threw the script out and began a new film instead. Akerman also explained that she was able to make a female-centric film because "at that point everybody was talking about women" and that it was "the right time".

Shooting Jeanne Dielman, 23 quai du Commerce, 1080 Bruxelles took five weeks. Akerman called it "a love film for my mother. It gives recognition to that kind of woman." Akerman used an all-female crew for the film, which she later said "didn't work that well – not because they were women but because I didn't choose them. It was enough just to be a woman to work on my film ... so the shooting was awful." Akerman further stated that the film is a reaction to "a hierarchy of images" in cinema that places a car accident or a kiss "higher in the hierarchy than washing up ... And it's not by accident, but relates to the place of woman in the social hierarchy ... Woman's work comes out of oppression and whatever comes out of oppression is more interesting. You have to be definite. You have to be."

The film depicts long moments of the life of Jeanne Dielman in real time, which Akerman said "was the only way to shoot the film – to avoid cutting the action in a hundred places, to look carefully and to be respectful. The framing was meant to respect her space, her, and her gestures within it." The long static shots ensure that the viewer "always knows where I am".

== Reception and legacy ==
=== Initial release ===
Jeanne Dielman, 23 quai du Commerce, 1080 Bruxelles premiered in the Directors' Fortnight of the 1975 Cannes Film Festival. It was initially met with mixed critical reception; many criticized it as a boring or meaningless exercise in minimalism, while others praised its visuals and use of time. The film's exposure and financial success in Europe helped Akerman to obtain funding for her 1978 film Les Rendez-vous d'Anna. Jeanne Dielman was not released in the United States until 1983.

Upon its release, critic Louis Marcorelles called it the "first masterpiece of the feminine in the history of the cinema". Jonathan Rosenbaum defended the film's length and pace, saying that it "needs its running time, for its subject is an epic one, and the overall sweep ... trains one to recognize and respond to fluctuations and nuances. If a radical cinema is something that goes to the roots of experience, this is at the very least a film that shows where and how some of these roots are buried". Critic Gary Indiana said that "Akerman's brilliance is her ability to keep the viewer fascinated by everything normally left out of movies". B. Ruby Rich said that "never before was the materiality of woman's time in the home rendered so viscerally ... She invents a new language capable of transmitting truths previously unspoken". Marsha Kinder called it "the best feature that I have ever seen made by a woman". Akerman was reluctant to be seen as a feminist filmmaker, stating that "I don't think woman's cinema exists".

The film has been characterized as an exemplar of the slow cinema genre, in which time is foregrounded and narrative action is downplayed. Critic Richard Brody called it a "tour de force of cinematic modernism [that] puts time onscreen as it was never seen before". Critic Jessica Winter wrote that "the film's strength derives in significant part from its austerity, patience, and extreme discipline", calling attention to its use of fixed shots, long takes, and absence of closeups or reaction shots. Winter asserted that "as the minutes and hours pass, Akerman rewards the viewer's attention by recalibrating it". In a 2009 essay, Ivone Marguilies observed that the film was "fully in tune" with the European women's movement of the time, and that feminist critics welcomed its "rigorous alignment of sexual/gender politics with a formal economy—showing cooking and hiding sex—... as an impressive alternative to well-intentioned but conventional political documentaries and features".

Jeanne Dielman, 23 quai du Commerce, 1080 Bruxelles has garnered a cult following and praise from the film community with filmmakers Todd Haynes, Gus Van Sant, and Céline Sciamma among those who have drawn explicit influence from the film; Van Sant named it an inspiration for his own similar films Gerry (2002) and Elephant (2003). The film has also been subject to spoofs and parodic versions. With the release of the DVD edition by The Criterion Collection in 2009, the company held a contest that invited fans to create cooking videos inspired by the film, and to post them on YouTube. On the review aggregator website Rotten Tomatoes, 95% of 64 critics' reviews are positive, with an average rating of 9/10. The website's consensus reads: "Jeanne Dielman, 23 Quai du Commerce, 1080 Bruxelles offers a lingering, unvarnished, and ultimately mesmerizing look at one woman's existence." Metacritic, which uses a weighted average, assigned the film a score of 94 out of 100, based on 16 critics, indicating "universal acclaim".

=== Accolades ===
The film was named the 19th greatest film of the 20th century in a critics' poll conducted by The Village Voice in 2000. It was rated 35th in the 2012 Sight & Sound "Greatest Films of All Time" critics' poll, and not rated in the top 100 of the 2012 directors' list. In 2022, the film was given the distinction of being voted as Sight & Sound's "greatest film of all time". The film ranked number 1 on the critics' poll, and tied for 4th place in the directors' poll. It is the fourth film to top the critics' poll after Bicycle Thieves, Citizen Kane, and Vertigo, and the first directed by a woman to do so.

== See also ==
- List of films voted the best
- List of cult films
