= Sois belle et tais-toi (1981 film) =

French feminist documentary

Sois belle et tais-toi (Be Pretty and Shut Up) is a feminist documentary film by French actress and director Delphine Seyrig, shot in 1976 and released in 1981. It is available at the Centre audiovisuel Simone de Beauvoir in Paris.

The film is a series of interviews with various well-known film actresses, including Jenny Agutter, Maria Schneider, and Jane Fonda. The title, which is borrowed from a 1958 film with the same name by Marc Allégret, refers to the sense the actresses have of what is expected of them by the film industry.
