= The Sight and Sound Greatest Films of All Time 2022 =

Opinion poll by the British Film Institute

The "Top 100 Greatest Films of All Time" is a list published every ten years by Sight and Sound according to worldwide opinion polls they conduct. They published the critics' list, based on 1,639 participating critics, programmers, curators, archivists and academics, and the directors' list, based on 480 directors and filmmakers. Sight and Sound, published by the British Film Institute (BFI), has conducted a poll of the greatest films every 10 years since 1952.

== Critics' poll ==
In the 2022 critics' poll, Jeanne Dielman, 23 quai du Commerce, 1080 Bruxelles was ranked first, replacing Vertigo from 2012, and Citizen Kane, which held the top spot in the five critics' polls before that. The film magazine described Jeanne Dielman as a "landmark feminist film", and stated that the 2022 list "shakes a fist at the established order". Jeanne Dielman is the first film directed by a woman to top the list and, together with Beau Travail, one of the first two such films to appear in the top 10.

Besides Jeanne Dielman and Beau Travail, two other films had never appeared in the top 10 previously: In the Mood for Love (2000); and Mulholland Drive (2001). Nine of the 100 films on the 2022 list were released in the 21st century, up from two in the 2012 list.

The top 10 from the critics' list are:

1. Jeanne Dielman, 23 quai du Commerce, 1080 Bruxelles (Chantal Akerman, 1975, Belgium/France) (215 votes, 13.1%)
2. Vertigo (Alfred Hitchcock, 1958, USA) (208 votes, 12.7%)
3. Citizen Kane (Orson Welles, 1941, USA) (163 votes, 9.9%)
4. Tokyo Story (Ozu Yasujiro, 1953, Japan) (144 votes)
5. In the Mood for Love (Wong Kar Wai, 2000, Hong Kong/France) (141 votes)
6. 2001: A Space Odyssey (Stanley Kubrick, 1968, UK/USA) (130 votes)
7. Beau Travail (Claire Denis, 1998, France) (106 votes)
8. Mulholland Drive (David Lynch, 2001, USA) (105 votes)
9. Man with a Movie Camera (Dziga Vertov, 1929, USSR) (100 votes)
10. Singin' in the Rain (Stanley Donen & Gene Kelly, 1952, USA) (99 votes)

== Directors' poll ==
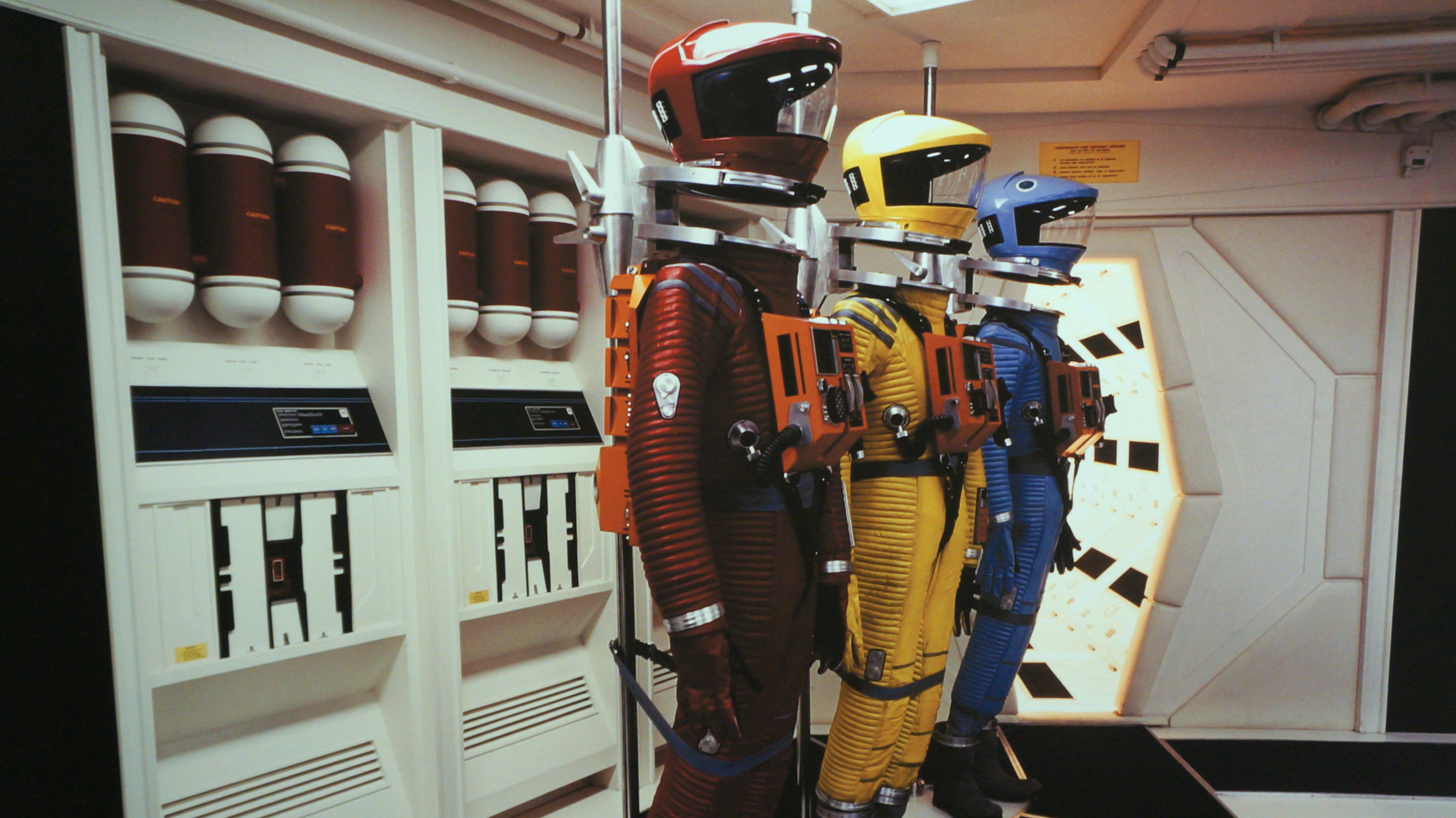
Props of 2001, A Space Odyssey

In the 2022 directors' poll, 2001: A Space Odyssey was ranked first, replacing Tokyo Story from 2012 and Citizen Kane, which held the top spot in both of the directors' polls previous to that.

The top 10 from the directors' list are:

1. 2001: A Space Odyssey (Stanley Kubrick, 1968)
2. Citizen Kane (Orson Welles, 1941)
3. The Godfather (Francis Ford Coppola, 1972)
4. Jeanne Dielman, 23 quai du Commerce, 1080 Bruxelles (Chantal Akerman, 1975)
4. Tokyo Story (Ozu Yasujiro, 1953)
6. Vertigo (Alfred Hitchcock, 1958)
6. 8½ (Federico Fellini, 1963)
8. Mirror (Andrei Tarkovsky, 1975)
9. Close-up (Abbas Kiarostami, 1989)
9. In the Mood for Love (Wong Kar Wai, 2000)
9. Persona (Ingmar Bergman, 1966)

== Reception ==
The critic's poll selection of Jeanne Dielman, 23, quai du Commerce, 1080 Bruxelles as the greatest film of all time drew strong reactions from journalists, critics, and filmmakers.

Peter Bradshaw of The Guardian praised the selection, writing that it is "high time a woman won Sight and Sound's all-time vote."

Armond White of conservative magazine National Review criticized the choice, describing the film as "a dull Marxist-feminist token" and alleging it was chosen for political reasons. Filmmaker Paul Schrader also attacked the list, writing that "The sudden appearance of Jeanne Dielman in the number one slot undermines the S&S poll's credibility ... this year's S&S poll reflects not a historical continuum but a politically correct rejiggering. Akerman's film is a favorite of mine ... but its unexpected number one rating does it no favors. Jeanne Dielman will from this time forward be remembered not only as an important film in cinema history but also as a landmark of distorted woke reappraisal."

Richard Panek of Observer questioned the very usefulness of the S&S poll itself, noting that "expressions of personal opinions, even in the aggregate, are by definition subjective".

Victoria Oliver Farner, on her video essay Sound & Sight & Time for MUBI, stated that:

In the eagerness to classify cinema, lists of the greatest films of all time have been created, which perhaps tell much more about the society that compiles them than about cinema itself. In the same way, Sound & Sight & Time perhaps speaks more about me than about Citizen Kane, Vertigo, or Jeanne Dielman.

== See also ==
- The Sight & Sound Greatest Films of All Time 2012
