= Carole Roussopoulos =

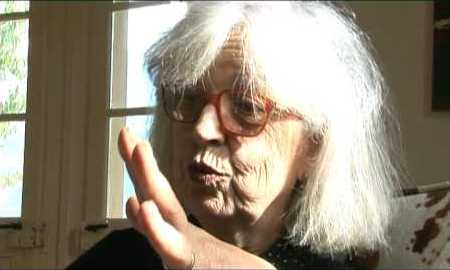
- Born: Carole de Kalbermatten; 25 May 1945; Lausanne, Switzerland
- Died: 22 October 2009 (aged 64)
- Spouse: Paul Roussopoulos

Carole Roussopoulos (25 May 1945 – 22 October 2009) was a Swiss film director and feminist who was primarily known for her pioneering early documentary films of the Women's liberation movement in France. She made approximately 150 documentaries during the course of her career.

== Early life ==
Carole de Kalbermatten was born 25 May 1945 in Lausanne, Switzerland. She grew up in Sion, Switzerland in the canton of Valais.

== Career ==
In 1969 Roussopoulos and her husband, Paul, created a film collective called Video Out. In 1970, at the urging of her friend the author Jean Genet, she purchased a light-weight Sony Portapak camera and began to make documentaries. It is believed that she is the first woman in France to buy a video camera. That same year she made the documentary film Genet parle d'Angela Davis (known in English as Angela Davis Is at Your Mercy) about the American political activist Angela Davis. During her early career, Roussopoulos also witnessed and filmed key events in the human rights crusades in Paris. For instance, her 1971 film FHAR (Front Homosexuel d'Action Révolutionnaire) documents the very first gay rights parade in Paris.

In 1976 Roussopoulos began collaborating with the French actress Delphine Seyrig. Together they directed the 1976 documentary on women's rights entitled SCUM Manifesto, based on the SCUM Manifesto written by the radical feminist Valerie Solanas. In 1982, Roussopoulos, Seyrig and Ioana Wieder founded the Simone de Beauvoir Audiovisual Center—named after the prominent French feminist author and philosopher—to document the women's rights movement.

In 1995 she moved back to Switzerland to document Swiss subjects that she felt were not receiving enough attention. During this time she made a series of films about healthcare, disease, aging, and death.

== Les Insoumuses ==
Roussopoulos, Seyrig, and translator Ivana Wieder formed the feminist collective video Les Insoumuses in 1975 after meeting at a video-editing workshop that Roussopoulos organized in her apartment. The name, Les Insoumuses, is a neologism combining "insoumise" (disobedient) and "muses." The collective produced several videos together, focusing on representations of women in the media, labour, and reproductive rights.

=== Select filmography ===
- LIP (series of six videos, 1973–1976)
- Y'a qua pas baiser (1973)
- Les Prostituées de Lyon parlent (1975)
- Maso et Miso vont en bateau (1975)
- SCUM Manifesto (1976)
- Debout! Une histoire du mouvement de libération des femmes (1999)
- Cinquantenaire du deuxième sexe: 1949-1999 (2001)

== Death ==
Roussopoulos died on 22 October 2009 in Molignon, Switzerland.

== Recognition ==
In 2001 Roussopoulos was named a Knight (or Chevalier) of the Legion of Honor in France for her thirty-two years of service to film.

== Legacy ==
In 2008 Tristan Aymon did the documentary film C comme Carole, and in 2011 the Swiss filmmaker Emmanuelle de Riedmatten made a documentary about Roussopoulos's life called Carole Roussoupolos, une femme à la caméra.
