= École nationale supérieure Louis-Lumière =

Postgraduate establishment serving the French audiovisual industry

- Other names: ENS Louis-Lumière
- Former names: École technique de photographie et de cinéma (ETPC; 1926–1964); École nationale de photographie et cinématographie (ENPC; 1964–1991)
- Type: EPIC
- Established: 1926; 100 years ago
- Founders: Louis Lumière; Léon Gaumont; Paul Montel
- Director: Vincent Lowy
- Students: 150
- Location: Paris, France; 48.9222°N 2.3356°E
- Campus: Urban
- Website: www.ens-louis-lumiere.fr

The École nationale supérieure Louis-Lumière (French pronunciation: [ekɔl nɑsjɔnal sypeʁjœʁ lwi lymjɛʁ]; ENS Louis-Lumière) is a film school located in Paris, France. It offers theoretical, practical as well as technical and artistic education and training for those wishing to go into the various branches of the audiovisual industry in France.

Run under the auspices of the Ministry of Higher Education, it offers a state-funded course at postgraduate level leading to a nationally recognised diploma equivalent to a Master's degree.

== History ==
The second film school in history, it was founded in 1926 as l'Ecole Technique de Cinématographie et de Photographie on the rue de Vaugirard, under the leadership of personalities such as Louis Lumière and Léon Gaumont. In 2012, the school moved to the Cité du Cinéma in Saint-Denis.

== Notable alumni ==
- Claire Atherton
- Fred Zinnemann (1926)
- Pierre Lhomme
- Gaspar Noé
- Claire Mathon
- Euzhan Palcy
- Michel Houellebecq (1981)
- Parviz Kimiavi
- Taïeb Louhichi
- Philippe Rousselot
- Eduardo Serra
- Bob Swaim
- Jaco Van Dormael
- Trần Anh Hùng
- Jean-Jacques Annaud
- Claude Zidi
- Benoît Delhomme
- Sophie Delaporte
- Laetitia Colombani (1998)
