= Delphine Seyrig =

French actress and director (1932–1990)

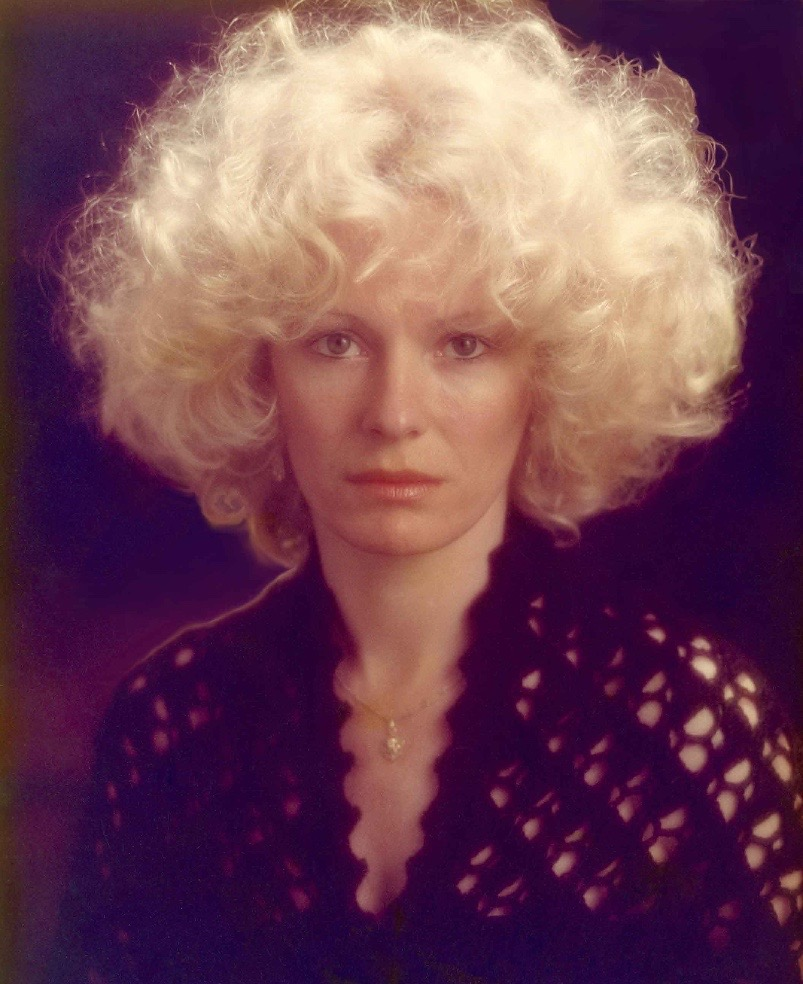
- Seyrig in 1972
- Born: Delphine Claire Beltiane Seyrig; 10 April 1932; Beirut, Lebanon
- Died: 15 October 1990 (aged 58); Paris, France
- Occupation: Actress
- Years active: 1952–1989
- Spouse: Jack Youngerman (divorced)
- Children: 1
- Parent(s): Henri Seyrig (father); Hermine de Saussure (mother)

Delphine Claire Beltiane Seyrig (French: [sɛʁiɡ]; 10 April 1932 – 15 October 1990) was a Lebanese-born French actress and film director. She came to prominence in Alain Resnais's 1961 film Last Year at Marienbad, and later acted in films by Chantal Akerman, Luis Buñuel, Jacques Demy, Marguerite Duras, Ulrike Ottinger, François Truffaut, Joseph Losey, and Fred Zinneman. She directed three films, including the documentary Sois belle et tais-toi (1981).

== Early life ==
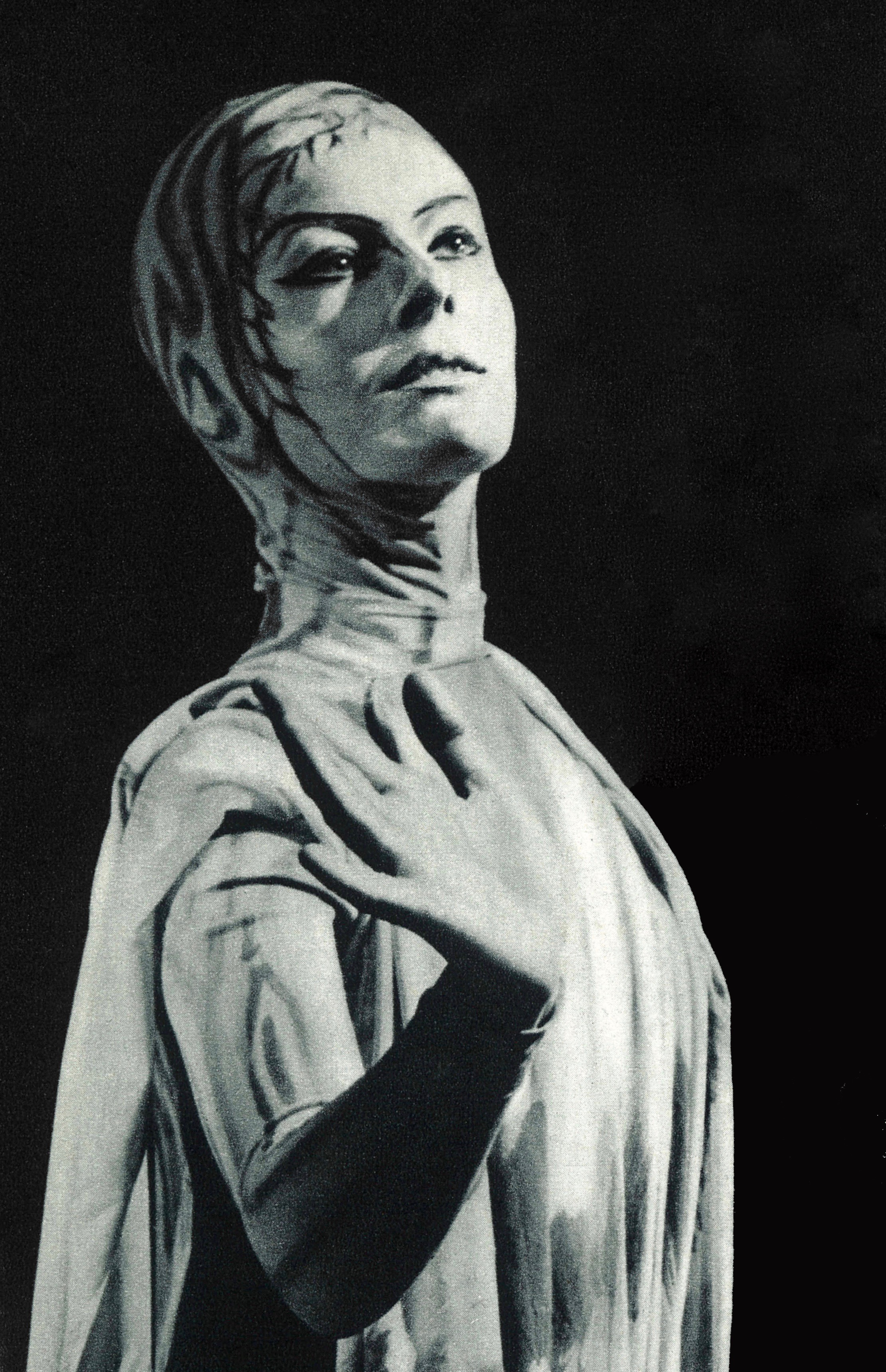
Seyrig as Ariel in Shakespeare's The Tempest in 1955

Seyrig was born into an intellectual Protestant family. Her Alsatian father, Henri Seyrig, was the director of the Beirut Archaeological Institute and later France's cultural attaché in New York during World War II. Her mother, Hermine de Saussure, was Swiss, and the niece of linguist/semiologist Ferdinand de Saussure.

Delphine was the sister of composer Francis Seyrig. Her family moved from Lebanon to New York City when she was ten. When the family returned to Lebanon in the late 1940s, she was sent to school at the Collège Protestant de Jeunes Filles, which had been founded by Protestant pacifists and social justice activists in 1938. She attended the school from 1947 to 1950.

== Career ==
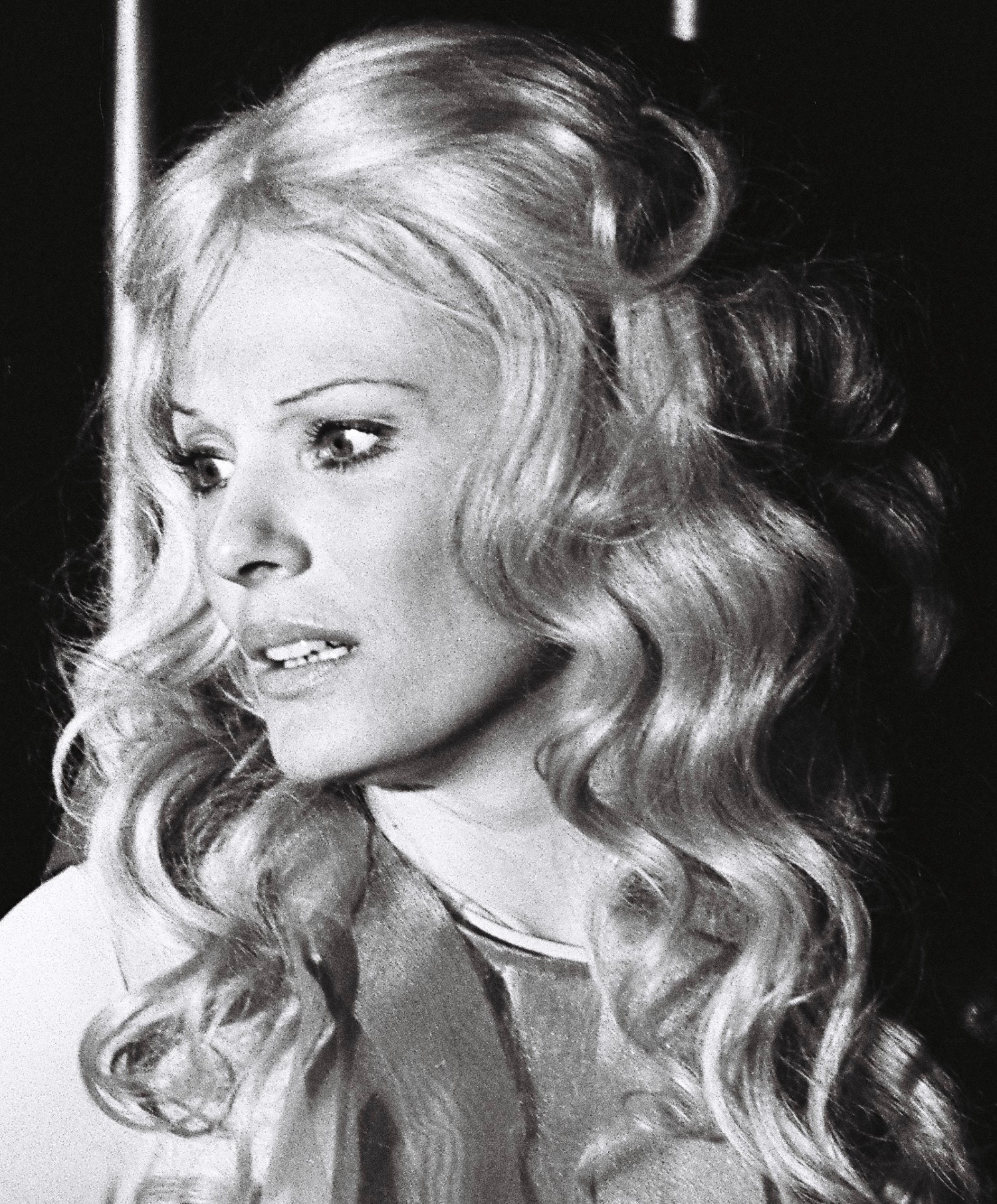
Seyrig in Fernando Arrabal's 1968 play Le jardin des délices

As a young woman, Seyrig studied acting at the Comédie de Saint-Étienne, training under Jean Dasté, and at Centre Dramatique de l'Est. She appeared briefly in small roles in the 1954 TV series Sherlock Holmes. In 1956, she returned to New York and studied at the Actors Studio. In 1959, she appeared in her first film, Pull My Daisy (short). In New York she met director Alain Resnais, who asked her to star in his film Last Year at Marienbad (1961). Her performance brought her international recognition and she moved to Paris. Among her roles of this period is the older married woman in François Truffaut's Stolen Kisses (1968).

During the 1960s and 1970s, Seyrig worked with directors including Truffaut, Luis Buñuel, Marguerite Duras, and Fred Zinnemann, as well as Resnais. She achieved recognition for both her stage and film work, and was named best actress at the Venice Film Festival for her role in Resnais' Muriel (1963). She played many diverse roles, and because she was fluent in French, English and German, she appeared in films in all three languages, including a number of Hollywood productions.

Seyrig is most widely known for her role as Colette de Montpellier in Zinnemann's 1973 film The Day of the Jackal. In turn, her most demanding role was in Chantal Akerman's 1975 film Jeanne Dielman, 23 quai du Commerce, 1080 Bruxelles, in which she was required to adopt a restrained and minimalistic mode of acting to convey the mindset of the title character.

She also contributed to music recordings, as a reciter, for example with the Nash Ensemble in Debussy's "Les chansons de Bilitis" (Virgin Classics recording, 1991, VC 7 91148-2).

Seyrig was a major feminist figure in France. Throughout her career, she used her celebrity status to promote women's rights. The most important of the three films she directed was the 1977 Sois belle et tais-toi (Be Pretty and Shut Up), which included actresses Shirley MacLaine, Maria Schneider, and Jane Fonda, speaking frankly about the level of sexism they had to deal with in the film industry. She also directed with Carole Roussopoulos an adaptation of the SCUM Manifesto by Valerie Solanas.

== Les Insoumuses ==
Seyrig, Carole Roussopoulos, and translator Ioana Wieder, formed the feminist video collective Les Insoumuses in 1975, after meeting at a video-editing workshop that Roussopoulos organized in her apartment. The name Les Insoumuses is a neologism combining "insoumise" (disobedient) and "muses". The collective produced several videos together, focusing on representations of women in the media, labour, and reproductive rights.

In 1982, Seyrig was a key member of the group that established the Paris-based Centre audiovisuel Simone-de-Beauvoir, which maintains a large archive of women's filmed and recorded work and produces work by and about women. In 1989, Seyrig was given a tribute at the Créteil International Women's Film Festival.

== Personal life ==
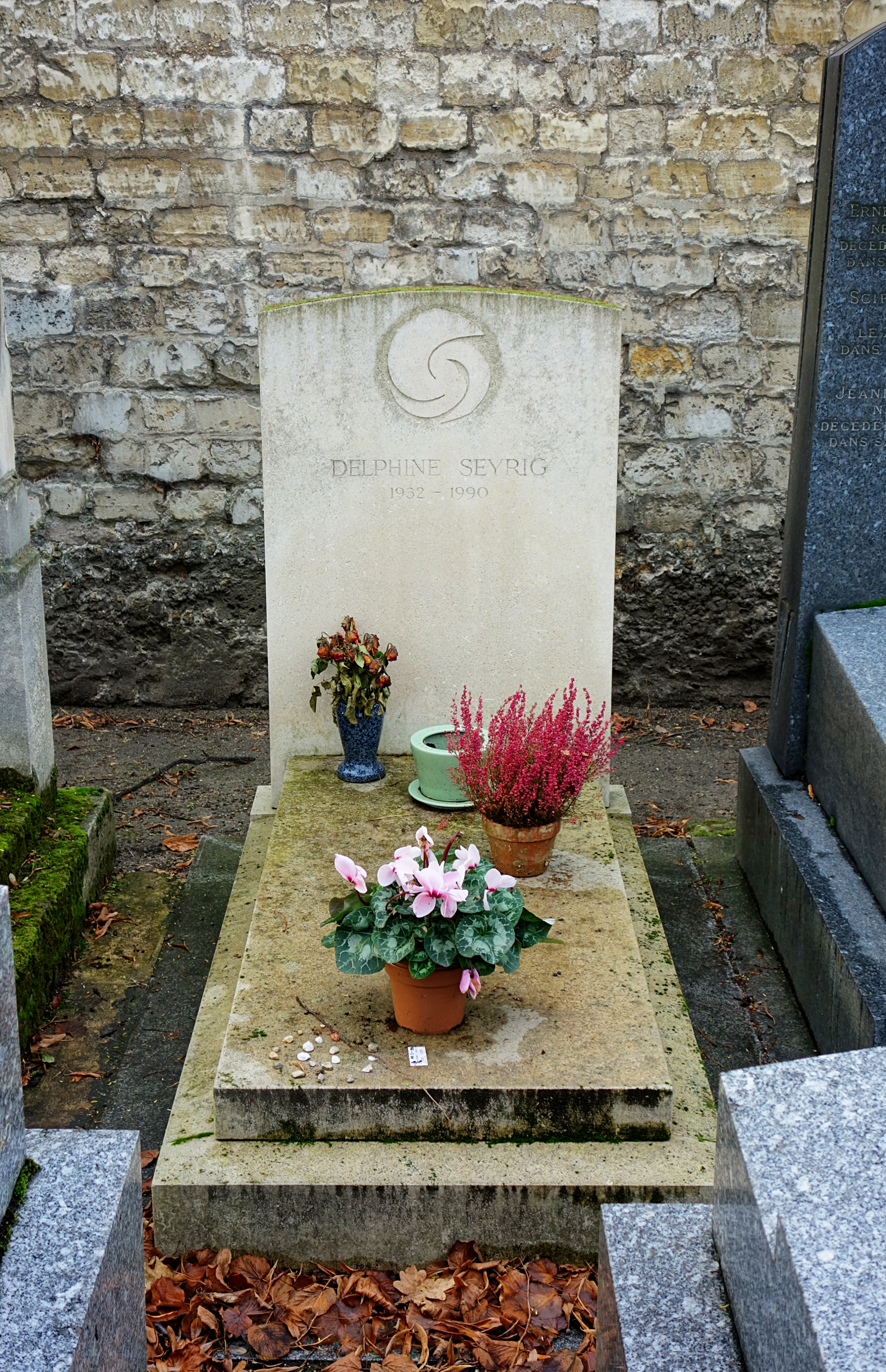
Grave of Seyrig in Montparnasse Cemetery (division 15), Paris

Seyrig married (and was later divorced from) American painter Jack Youngerman (1926–2020), who had studied at the École des Beaux-Arts in Paris.

In 1971, Seyrig signed the Manifesto of the 343, publicly declaring she had had an illegal abortion. She was the unrequited love of Anglo-French actor Michael Lonsdale.

Seyrig died in a Paris hospital on October 15, 1990, from lung cancer, aged 58.

== Select filmography ==
=== As actress ===
- 1954 Sherlock Holmes in "The Mother Hubbard Case", "The Case of the Singing Violin"
- 1959 Pull My Daisy, as the wife of Milo
- 1961 Last Year at Marienbad, as A – La femme brune
- 1963 Muriel, as Hélène Aughain
- 1966 Who Are You, Polly Magoo?, as a journalist
- 1967 Accident, as Francesca
- 1968 Stolen Kisses, as Fabienne Tabard
- 1969 Mr. Freedom, as Marie-Madeleine
- 1969 The Milky Way, as La prostituée
- 1970 Le Lys dans la vallée (TV), as Mme de Mortsauf
- 1970 Donkey Skin, as La fée des Lilas (The Lilac Fairy)
- 1971 Daughters of Darkness (Le rouge aux lèvres), as Countess Bathory
- 1971 Tartuffe (TV), as Elmire
- 1972 The Discreet Charm of the Bourgeoisie, as Simone Thévenot
- 1973 The Day of the Jackal, as Collette de Montpellier
- 1973 A Doll's House, as Kristine Linde
- 1974 The Black Windmill, as Celi Burrows
- 1974 The Heart's Cry, as Mme Bunkermann
- 1975 Aloïse, as Aloïse adulte
- 1975 The Last Word, as Simone
- 1975 Le Jardin qui bascule, as Kate
- 1975 Jeanne Dielman, 23 quai du Commerce, 1080 Bruxelles, as Jeanne Dielman
- 1975 India Song, as Anne-Marie Stretter
- 1976 Caro Michele, as Adriana Vivanti
- 1976 Son nom de Venise dans Calcutta désert, as Anne-Marie Stretter
- 1977 Baxter, Vera Baxter, as L'inconnue
- 1977 Repérages, as Julie
- 1979 Utkozben, as Barabara
- 1980 Le Chemin perdu, as Mathilde Schwarz
- 1980 Chère inconnue, as Yvette
- 1981 Freak Orlando as Helena Müller, as Lebensbaumgöttin, Kaufhausonsängerin, Mutter der Wundergeburt
- 1981 Le Petit Pommier (TV), as La mère
- 1981 The Man of Destiny (TV), as The Lady
- 1983 Le Grain de sable, as Solange
- 1984 Dorian Gray in the Mirror of the Yellow Press, as Dr. Mabuse
- 1986 Seven Women, Seven Sins (segment "Pride")
- 1986 Golden Eighties, as Jeanne Schwartz
- 1986 Les Étonnements d'un couple moderne (TV), as Marie-Claude Poitevin
- 1986 Letters Home, as Aurelia Plath
- 1989 Johanna D'Arc of Mongolia, as Lady Windermere

=== As director ===
- 1975 Maso et Miso vont en bateau
- 1976 Scum Manifesto
- 1981 Sois belle et tais-toi

== Sources ==
- François Poirié. Comme une apparition: Delphine Seyrig, portrait, Actes Sud, 28 February 2007 (paperback); ISBN 978-2-7427-6673-4
