= Je Tu Il Elle =

- French theatrical release poster
- Directed by: Chantal Akerman
- Written by: Chantal Akerman; Eric de Kuyper; Paul Paquay
- Produced by: Chantal Akerman
- Starring: Chantal Akerman; Niels Arestrup; Claire Wauthion
- Cinematography: Bénédicte Delesalle; Renelde Dupont; Charlotte Szlovak
- Edited by: Luc Fréché; Geneviève Luciani
- Production company: Paradise Films
- Distributed by: Unité Trois; Olympic Films
- Release dates: 19 November 1974 (Belgium); 17 November 1976 (France)
- Running time: 86 minutes
- Countries: Belgium; France
- Language: French

Je Tu Il Elle ([ʒə ty il ɛl]; English: "I You He She") is a 1974 drama film produced and directed by Chantal Akerman, co-written by Akerman, Eric de Kuyper and Paul Paquay. Starring Akerman, Niels Arestrup and Claire Wauthion, it follows the depressed lesbian Julie following a breakup with her lover.

The film was originally received with mixed reviews, for its slow pace and explicit lesbian sex scene (a first for a mainstream feature film). In the following decades, it gained reappraisal alongside Akerman’s body of work, becoming a cult classic. It has been labelled as a feminist film and an early example of the slow cinema genre.

== Plot ==
Julie is a depressed young woman who locks herself alone in her home after a painful breakup with her unnamed lover. For the first third of the film, she rearranges her furniture, writes letters, lounges naked, and eats sugar out of a paper bag.

She eventually leaves her room and hitchhikes with a young male truck driver. They make stops at a restaurant, a bar, and a restroom. She gives him a handjob and he discusses his family life in a long monologue, before they part ways.

She then visits a woman, her ex-lover, who makes Julie sandwiches and a drink. Julie suggestively begins to undress the woman, who tells her to only leave in the morning, and they have sex. As dawn breaks, Julie leaves.

== Cast ==
- Chantal Akerman as Julie
- Niels Arestrup as the driver
- Claire Wauthion as the woman

== Production ==
Akerman wrote the story for the film a few years prior to filming that she described once as both very personal along with not autobiographical due to its structure that mixes with her experiences as a teenager. The sex scene between Julie and her ex-lover is the first graphic lesbian sex scene in mainstream cinema, and one of the longest lesbian sex scenes in film.

== Release ==
To celebrate the 30th anniversary of the Teddy Awards, the film was selected to be shown at the 66th Berlin International Film Festival in February 2016.

=== Critical reception ===
The movie was well received by critics. On review aggregator Rotten Tomatoes, the film has a 100% rating based on reviews from 8 critics, and an average rating of 7.80/10.

Feminist and queer film scholar B. Ruby Rich believed that Je Tu Il Elle can be seen as a "cinematic Rosetta Stone of female sexuality".

As appreciation grew for Ankerman's films, the film was placed in 225th place in the 2022 Sight and Sound poll, tying with films like Napoleon, Petite Maman, The Crowd, Happy Together, and Grave of the Fireflies.
