= D'Est =

- Directed by: Chantal Akerman
- Written by: Chantal Akerman
- Produced by: Loudmila Priciajnaia
- Cinematography: Rémon Fromont; Bernard Delville
- Edited by: Claire Atherton; Agnès Bruckert
- Production companies: Lieurac Productions; Paradise Films; Rádio e Televisão de Portugal
- Distributed by: Icarus Films
- Release date: August 1993
- Running time: 107 minutes
- Countries: Belgium; France; Portugal
- Languages: German; Polish; Russian

D'Est [dɛst], translated into English as From the East, is a 16-mm experimental documentary film, shot in Poland, Ukraine, Russia and the former East Germany. The film investigates the stories of people’s lives in an unstable time after the collapse of the Eastern Bloc through the idea of memory. The film has no commentary or dialogue and instead documents landscapes and residents in an observational manner. Okwui Enwezor, curator, art critic and writer, describes the characters in the film as “bewildered, anachronistic and depthless in the harsh flare of history”.

== Plot ==
The travelogue format of the film documents the crumbling of the Soviet Bloc in Eastern Europe. The film was conceived “in the aftermath of impressions, memories, and emotions” which Akerman brought back following a research trip for a film about the Russian poet Anna Akhmatova, whom Akerman cites as a great influence. The structure of D’Est is characterized by its sobriety and rigour, used to articulate the film’s expressiveness. The film utilizes an obsessive, asynchronous rhythm of repetitions and looping. Characters and locations within the film are meticulously examined but their consequent fates are never resolved. The film's long, meditative shots emphasize the circularity of connections between personal and collective histories. The film presents a complex assemblage of images, sounds and connected fragments, which results in a “hypnotic inventory of people and landscapes.”

== Cinematography ==
The cinematography of D’Est uses only available light and is executed through long, real-time shots, contributing to the genuine and unstaged nature of the film. Akerman uses two main filming approaches: the stationary fixed perspective, with figures flowing towards the camera, and the tracking shot, with the camera moving slowly along streets and paths. The film also includes examples of the panning shot, where the camera rotates around a central point. The moving shots convey a sense of anxiety and vertigo. The stalking nature of the shots reveals the inhumanity of the camera.

The film does not make a claim to realism or objective expertise regarding the collapse of Communism but instead examines the individual stories of characters in intimate ways, surveying their fear of the surrounding political opacity. Akerman presents a continuous, nonsynchronous montage of images and sounds, provoking unfiltered optical and auditory impressions. The smoothness of the visual continuity is used as a tactic to accentuate the effects of narrative disjunction and discontinuity.

== Iterations of the film ==
D’Est has had several iterations of presentation. Akerman originally showed the film in a traditional format, and later expanded into a multi-media installation. The installation was a part of a discourse about Eastern European identity at the Walker Art Center in Minneapolis in 1991. Kathy Halbreich, executive director of MoMA, describes the exhibition as a deconstructive tour of the production process, examining the nature of filmmaking in reverse. The museum installation was segmented into three viewing chambers. In the first gallery, the film plays in a dark theatre space on a continuous loop. In the second gallery, eight triptychs of video monitors show short sequences from the film simultaneously. In the third gallery, a single video monitor shows Akerman reciting two texts: a biblical passage in Hebrew and a selection from her own writing on the film. Based on the performativity of Akerman’s work, Hans Ulrich Obrist, critic, curator and art historian, points to the artist’s occupation of a unique space between the cinema movie and the art installation.
