= Chantal Akerman =

Belgian film director, screenwriter, and educator (1950–2015)

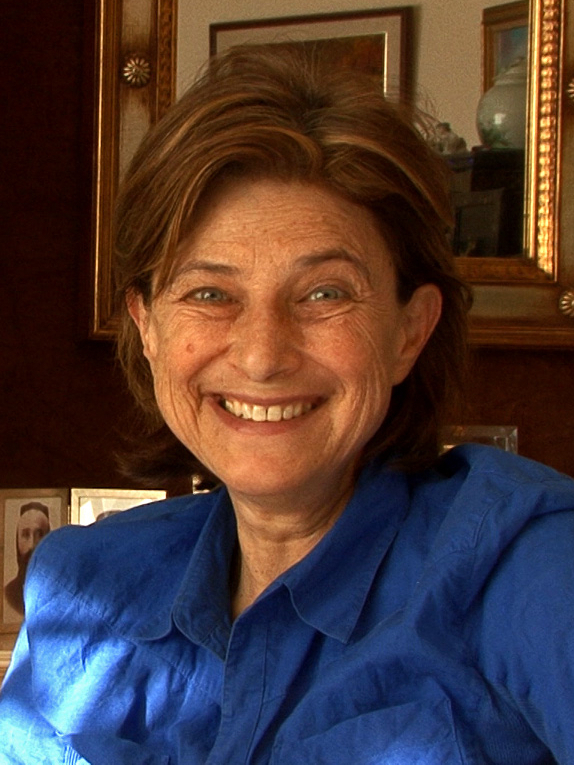
- Akerman in 2012
- Born: Chantal Anne Akerman; 6 June 1950; Brussels, Belgium
- Died: 5 October 2015 (aged 65); Paris, France
- Burial place: Père Lachaise Cemetery
- Occupations: Film director, screenwriter, artist, and film professor
- Years active: 1968–2015
- Notable work: Jeanne Dielman, 23 quai du Commerce, 1080 Bruxelles; Je Tu Il Elle; Les Rendez-vous d'Anna; News from Home
- Partner: Sonia Wieder-Atherton

Chantal Anne Akerman (French: [ʃɑ̃tal akɛʁman]; 6 June 1950 – 5 October 2015) was a Belgian filmmaker, artist, and film professor at the City College of New York (2011–2015).

Akerman is best known for her films Je Tu Il Elle (1974), Jeanne Dielman, 23 quai du Commerce, 1080 Bruxelles (1975), and News from Home (1976). The second of these was ranked the greatest film of all time in Sight & Sound magazine's 2022 "Greatest Films of All Time" critics poll, making her the first woman to top the poll. The other two films also appeared in the same poll.

== Early life and education ==
Akerman was born in Brussels, Belgium, to Polish-Jewish parents and émigres, both of whom were Holocaust survivors from Nazi Germany. She was the older sister of Sylviane Akerman, her only sibling. Her mother, Natalia (Nelly), survived for years at Auschwitz, where her own parents were murdered. From a young age, Akerman and her mother were exceptionally close, and her mother encouraged her to pursue a career rather than marry young.

At age 18, Akerman entered the Institut national supérieur des arts du spectacle et des techniques de diffusion, a Belgian film school. She dropped out during her first term to make the short film Saute ma ville, funding it by trading diamond shares on the Antwerp stock exchange.

== Work ==
=== Early work and influences ===
At age 15, Akerman's viewing of Jean-Luc Godard's Pierrot le fou (1965) inspired her to become a filmmaker. Akerman's first short film, Saute ma ville (1968), premiered at the International Short Film Festival Oberhausen in 1971. That year, she moved to New York City, where she would stay until 1972. She considered her time there to be a formative experience, becoming exposed to the works of Andy Warhol, Jonas Mekas, and Michael Snow, with the latter's film La région centrale leading to her view of "time as the most important thing in film." Also during this period, she would begin her long collaboration with cinematographer Babette Mangolte.

Her first feature film, the documentary Hotel Monterey (1972), along with the short films La Chambre 1 and La Chambre 2, use long takes and structuralist techniques that would become trademarks of her style.

=== Critical recognition ===
Akerman then returned to Belgium, and in 1974 received critical recognition for her first fiction feature Je, Tu, Il, Elle (I, You, He, She), notable for its depiction of women's sexuality, a theme which would appear again in several of her films. Feminist and queer film scholar B. Ruby Rich believed that Je Tu Il Elle can be seen as a "cinematic Rosetta Stone of female sexuality".

Akerman's most critically-acclaimed film, Jeanne Dielman, 23 Quai du Commerce, 1080 Bruxelles, was released in 1975, and presents a largely real-time study of a middle-aged widow's routine of domestic chores and prostitution. Upon the film's release, Le Monde called Jeanne Dielman the "first masterpiece of the feminine in the history of the cinema". Scholar Ivonne Margulies says the picture is a filmic paradigm for uniting feminism and anti-illusionism. The film was named the 19th greatest film of the 20th century by J. Hoberman of the Village Voice. In December 2022, Jeanne Dielman was awarded first place by Sight & Sound magazine's "Top 100 Greatest Films of All Time" list, as voted by critics, becoming the fourth film to do so after Bicycle Thieves, Citizen Kane, and Vertigo. Jeanne Dielman, 23 Quai du Commerce, 1080 Bruxelles thus became the first film directed by a woman to top the list and, together with Beau Travail, one of the first two such films to appear in the top 10.

=== Feminism ===
Akerman has used the setting of a kitchen to explore the intersection between femininity and domesticity. The kitchens in her work provide intimate spaces for connection and conversation, functioning as a backdrop to the dramas of daily life. The kitchens, alongside other domestic spaces, act as self-confining prisons under patriarchal conditions. In Akerman's work, the kitchen often acts as a domestic theatre.

Akerman is usually grouped within feminist and queer thinking, but she articulated her distance from an essentialist feminism. Akerman resisted labels relating to her identity like "female", "Jewish" and "lesbian", choosing instead to immerse herself in the identity of being a daughter; she said she saw film as a "generative field of freedom from the boundaries of identity". She advocated for multiplicity of expression, explaining, "when people say there is a feminist film language, it is like saying there is only one way for women to express themselves". For Akerman, there are as many cinematic languages as there are individuals.

Margulies argues that Akerman's resistance to categorization is in response to the rigidity of cinema's earlier essentialist realism and "indicates an awareness of the project of a transhistorical and transcultural feminist aesthetics of the cinema".

Akerman works with the feminist motto of the personal being political, complicating it by an investigation of representational links between private and public. In Jeanne Dielman, the protagonist does not supply a transparent, accurate representation of a fixed social reality. Throughout the film, the housewife and prostitute Jeanne is revealed to be a construct, with multiple historical, social, and cinematic resonances.

Akerman engages with realist representations, a form historically grounded to act as a feminist gesture and simultaneously as an "irritant" to fixed categories of "woman".

=== Later career ===
Akerman's later films experimented with differing genres and tempos, including the comedy Golden Eighties (1986), and several documentaries. In 2013, she published Ma mère rit ("My Mother Laughs"), a memoir about the last years of her mother's life. It was published in English, translated by Daniella Shreir, in 2019. Her final film, No Home Movie, was released in 2015.

In 1991, Akerman was a member of the jury at the 41st Berlin International Film Festival. In 2011, she joined the full-time faculty of the MFA Program in Media Arts Production at the City College of New York as a distinguished lecturer and the first Michael & Irene Ross Visiting Professor of Film/Video & Jewish Studies. Akerman was also Professor of Film at The European Graduate School.

== Exhibitions ==
Solo exhibitions of Akerman's work have been held at the Museum for Contemporary Art, Antwerp, Belgium (2012), MIT, Cambridge Massachusetts (2008), the Tel Aviv Museum of Art, Israel (2006); Princeton University Art Museum, Princeton, NJ (2006); and the Centre Georges Pompidou, Paris (2003). Akerman participated in Documenta XI (2002) and the Venice Biennale (2001).

In 2011, a film retrospective of Akerman's work was shown at the Austrian Film Museum.

The 2015 Venice Biennale included her final video installation, Now, an installation of interspersed parallel screens displaying the landscape-in-motion footage that would appear in No Home Movie. In 2018, the Manhattan Jewish Museum presented the installation in the exhibition Scenes from the Collection, and acquired her work for the collection. Marian Goodman Gallery in Paris featured From the Other Side (2002) and Je tu il elle, l'installation (2007) in early 2022.

== Style ==
Akerman's filming style relies on capturing ordinary life. By encouraging viewers to have patience with a slow pace, her films emphasize the humanity of the everyday. Art curator Kathy Halbreich writes that Akerman "creates a cinema of waiting, of passages, of resolutions deferred".

Many of Akerman's films portray the movement of people across distances or their absorption with claustrophobic spaces. Curator Jon Davies writes that her domestic interiors "conceal gendered labour and violence, secrecy and shame, where traumas both large and small unfold with few if any witnesses". Akerman addresses the voyeurism that is always present within cinematic discourse by often playing a character within her films, placing herself on both sides of the camera simultaneously. She used the boredom of structuralism to generate a bodily feeling in the viewer, accentuating the passage of time.

Akerman was influenced by European art cinema as well as structuralist film. Structuralist film used formalist experimentation to propose a reciprocal relationship between image and viewer. Akerman cites Michael Snow as a structuralist inspiration, especially his film Wavelength, which is composed of a single shot of a photograph of a sea on a loft wall, with the camera slowly zooming in. Akerman was drawn to the perceived dullness of structuralism because it rejected the dominant cinema's concern for plot. As a teenager in Brussels, Akerman skipped school to see movies, including films from the Knokke-Le-Zoute Experimental Film Festival.

Art historian Terrie Sultan writes that Akerman's "narrative is marked by an almost Proustian attention to detail and visual grace". Similarly, Akerman's visual language resists easy categorization and summarization: she creates narrative through filmic syntax instead of plot development.

Many directors have cited Akerman's directorial style as an influence on their work. Kelly Reichardt, Gus Van Sant, and Sofia Coppola have noted their exploration of filming in real time as a tribute to Akerman. Artist Tacita Dean in conversation with artist Amadour called Jeanne Dielman an "absolute masterpiece," they shared their mutual respect for Akerman's work and the impact of her work on art history.

== Family and Relationships ==
Akerman had an extremely close relationship with her mother, Natalia Akerman, which was captured in several of her films. In News from Home (1976), Akerman's mother's letters outlining mundane family activities are read aloud throughout the film. Dis-moi from 1980 is a portrait of Akerman's mother in Brussels, exploring her mother's refusal to speak about her experiences during the Holocaust. Her 2015 film No Home Movie centers on mother-daughter relationships, is largely situated in her mother's kitchen, and was filmed in the final months before her mother's death in 2014. The film explores issues of metempsychosis, the last shot of the film acting as a memento mori of the mother's apartment. Akerman's 1986 film Letters Home similarly explores the relationship between Sylvia Plath and her mother Aurelia.

Akerman acknowledged that her mother was at the center of her work and admitted to feeling directionless after her death. The maternal imagery can be found throughout all of Akerman's films as an homage and an attempt to reconstitute the image and voice of the mother. In her autobiographical book Family in Brussels, Akerman narrates the story, interchanging her own voice with her mother's.

Akerman had a long-term relationship with cellist Sonia Wieder-Atherton who also collaborated on a number of the director's projects.

== Death ==
Akerman died by suicide on 5 October 2015 in Paris, at the age of 65. Her last film was the documentary No Home Movie, a series of conversations with her mother shortly before her mother's death. Of the film, she said, "I think if I knew I was going to do this, I wouldn't have dared to do it."

According to Akerman's sister, she had been hospitalized for depression and then returned home to Paris ten days before her death.

== Filmography ==
=== Feature films ===
Year	Original Title	English title	Role	Notes
1974	Je Tu Il Elle	I You He She	Julie	Director & Writer
1975	Jeanne Dielman, 23 Quai du Commerce, 1080 Bruxelles	Jeanne Dielman	The voice of a neighbour in the hallway	Director & Writer
1978	Les rendez-vous d'Anna	Meetings with Anna		Director & Writer
1982	Toute une nuit	All Night Long		Director & Writer
1986	Golden Eighties			Director
1986	Letters Home			Director Telefilm
1989	Histoires d'Amérique	American Stories: Food, Family and Philosophy		Director & Writer 39th Berlin International Film Festival
1991	Nuit et jour	Night and Day		Director & Writer 48th Venice International Film Festival
1996	Un divan à New York	A Couch in New York		Director & Writer
2000	La captive	The Captive		Director & Writer
2004	Demain on déménage	Tomorrow We Move		Director & Writer
2011	La folie Almayer	Almayer's Folly		Director & Writer

=== Short films ===
Year	Title	Role	Notes
1968	Saute ma Ville (Blow Up My Town)		
1971	L'enfant aimé ou Je joue à être une femme mariée (The Beloved Child, or I Play at Being a Married Woman)		
1972	La Chambre 1 (The Room 1)		Also editor
1972	La Chambre 2 (The Room 2)		Also editor
1973	Le 15/8		Co-directed by Samy Szlingerbaum; Akerman was also joint cinematographer and film editor
1982	Hôtel des Acacias		Co-directed by Michèle Blondeel and the students of INSAS (Yves Hanchar, Pierre Charles Rochette, François Vanderveken, Isabelle Willems)
1983	L'homme à la valise (The Man With the Suitcase)		Episode of Télévision de chambre
1984	J'ai faim, j'ai froid (I'm Hungry, I'm Cold)		Segment of Paris vu par, 20 ans après
1984	New York, New York bis		Lost film
1986	La paresse (Sloth)		Segment of Seven Women, Seven Sins
1986	Le marteau (The Hammer)		
1986	Mallet-Stevens		
1992	Le déménagement (Moving In)		
1992	Pour Febe Elisabeth Velásquez, El Salvador (For Febe Elisabeth Velásquez, El Salvador)		Segment of Contre l'oubli (Lest We Forget)
1994	Portrait d’une jeune fille de la fin des années 60 à Bruxelles (Portrait of a Young Girl at the End of the 1960s in Brussels)		Episode of Tous les garçons et les filles de leur âge... (All the Boys and Girls of their Time...)
2007	Tombée de nuit sur Shanghaï		Segment of O Estado do Mundo

=== Documentaries ===
Year	Title	Role	Notes
1972	Hotel Monterey		
1973	Hanging Out Yonkers		unfinished
1976	News from Home		
1980	Dis-moi (Tell Me)		
1983	Les Années 80 (The Eighties)		
1983	Un jour Pina à demandé (One Day Pina Asked Me / On Tour with Pina Bausch)		
1984	Lettre d'un cinéaste (Letter from a Filmmaker)		
1989	Les trois dernières sonates de Franz Schubert (Franz Schubert's Last Three Sonatas)		
1989	Trois strophes sur le nom de Sacher (Three Stanzas on the Name Sacher)		
1993	D'Est (From the East)		
1997	Chantal Akerman par Chantal Akerman		
1999	Sud (South)		
2002	De l'autre côté (From the Other Side)	Director, Cinematographer	
2003	Avec Sonia Wieder-Atherton		
2006	Là-bas (Down There)	Director, Cinematographer	
2009	À l'Est avec Sonia Wieder-Atherton		
2015	No Home Movie	Director, Cinematographer	

== See also ==
- List of female film and television directors
- List of lesbian filmmakers
- List of LGBT-related films directed by women
