= Doillon =

Doillon is a surname. Notable people with the surname include:

- Jacques Doillon (born 1944), French film director
- Lola Doillon (born 1975), French director and screenwriter, daughter of Jacques
- Lou Doillon (born 1982), French singer-songwriter, artist, actress and model, daughter of Jacques
