= Sophie Marceau =

French actress (born 1966)

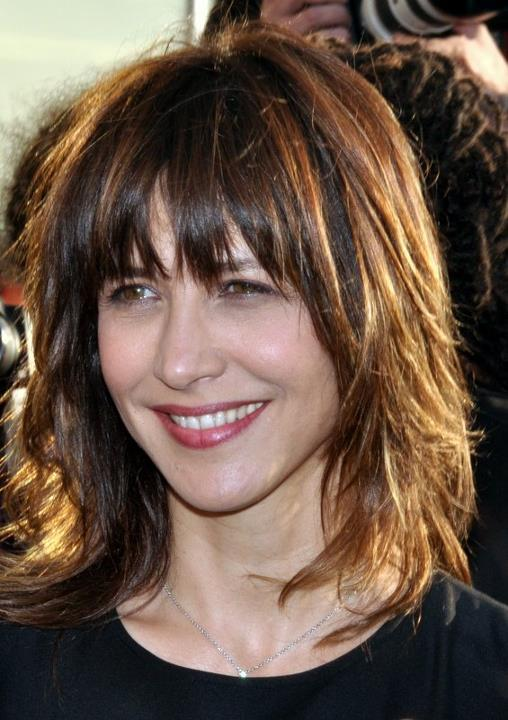
- Marceau at the 2012 Cabourg Film Festival
- Born: Sophie Danièle Sylvie Maupu; 17 November 1966 (age 60); Paris, France
- Occupation: Actress
- Years active: 1980–present
- Partner(s): Andrzej Żuławski (1985–2001); Christopher Lambert (2007–14)
- Children: 2
- Awards: See below

Sophie Marceau (French: [sɔfi maʁso]; born Sophie Danièle Sylvie Maupu, 17 November 1966) is a French actress. As a teenager, she achieved popularity with her debut films La Boum (1980) and La Boum 2 (1982), receiving a César Award for Most Promising Actress. She became a film star in Europe with a string of successful films, including L'Étudiante (1988), Pacific Palisades (1990), Fanfan (1993) and Revenge of the Musketeers (1994). She became an international film star with her performances in Braveheart (1995), Firelight (1997), Anna Karenina (1997) and as Elektra King in the 19th James Bond film The World Is Not Enough (1999). Some of her later films tackle critical social issues such as Arrêtez-moi (2013), Jailbirds (2015) and Everything Went Fine (2021).

Marceau has appeared on more than 300 magazine covers worldwide and been the face of numerous luxury brands. She was made Officer (Officier) in the Ordre des Arts et des Lettres by the Minister of Culture of France in 2003, and in 2015 she revealed that she had declined the Legion of Honour (Ordre national de la Légion d'honneur).

== Early life ==
She was born 17 November 1966 in Paris, the second child of Simone (née Morisset), who was a shop assistant, and Benoît Maupu, a truck driver. Her parents divorced when she was nine years old.

== Film career ==
In February 1980, Marceau and her mother came across a model agency looking for teenagers. Marceau had photos taken at the agency, but did not think anything would come of it. At the same time, Françoise Menidrey, the casting director for Claude Pinoteau's La Boum (1980), asked modeling agencies to recommend a new teenager for the project. After viewing the rushes, Alain Poiré, the director of the Gaumont, signed Marceau to a long-term contract. La Boum was a hit film, with 4,378,500 tickets sold in France. In 1981, Marceau made her singing debut with French singer François Valéry on record "Dream in Blue", written by Pierre Delanoë. She rejected the main role in a soon-to-be controversial film, Beau-père, in which she would have played as a teenage girl who seduces her step-father for a sexual relationship. The role was eventually played by Ariel Besse. In 1982, at age 16, Marceau bought back her contract with Gaumont for one million French francs. She borrowed most of the money.

After starring in the sequel film La Boum 2 (1982), Marceau focused on more dramatic roles, including the historical drama Fort Saganne in 1984 with Gérard Depardieu and Catherine Deneuve, Joyeuses Pâques (Happy Easter) in 1984, L'amour braque and Police in 1985, and Descente aux enfers (Descent into Hell) in 1986. In 1988, she starred in L'Étudiante (The Student) and the historical adventure film Chouans!. That year, Marceau was named Best Romantic Actress at the International Festival of Romantic Movies for her role in Chouans!

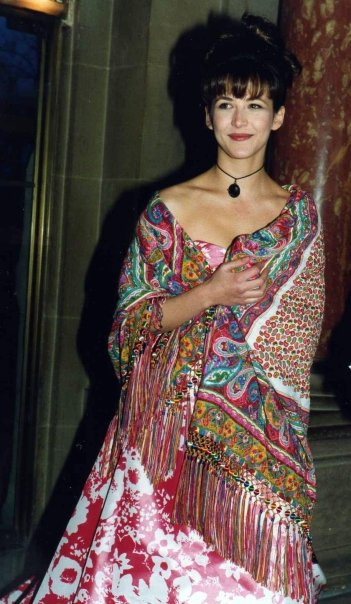
Marceau, at the Molière Awards, 1993

In 1989, Marceau starred in My Nights Are More Beautiful Than Your Days, which was directed by her long-time partner Andrzej Zulawski. In 1990, she starred in Pacific Palisades and La note bleue, her third film directed by her companion. In 1991, she ventured into the theater in Eurydice, which earned Marceau the Moliere Award for Best Female Newcomer. Throughout the 1990s, Marceau began making less-dramatic films, such as the comedy Fanfan in 1993 and Revenge of the Musketeers (La fille de d'Artagnan) in 1994—both popular in Europe and abroad. That year, she returned to the theatre as Eliza Doolittle in Pygmalion.

Marceau achieved international recognition in 1995 playing the role of Princess Isabelle in Mel Gibson's Braveheart. That year, she was part of an ensemble of international actors in the French film Beyond the Clouds, directed by Michelangelo Antonioni and Wim Wenders. In 1997, she continued her string of successful films with William Nicholson's Firelight, filmed in England, Véra Belmont's Marquise, filmed in France, and Bernard Rose's Anna Karenina, filmed in Russia. In 1999, she played Hippolyta in A Midsummer Night's Dream, and the villainous Bond girl Elektra King in The World Is Not Enough. In 2000, Marceau teamed up again with her then-partner Andrzej Zulawski to film Fidelity, playing the role of a talented photographer who takes a job at a scandal-mongering tabloid and becomes romantically involved with an eccentric children's book publisher.

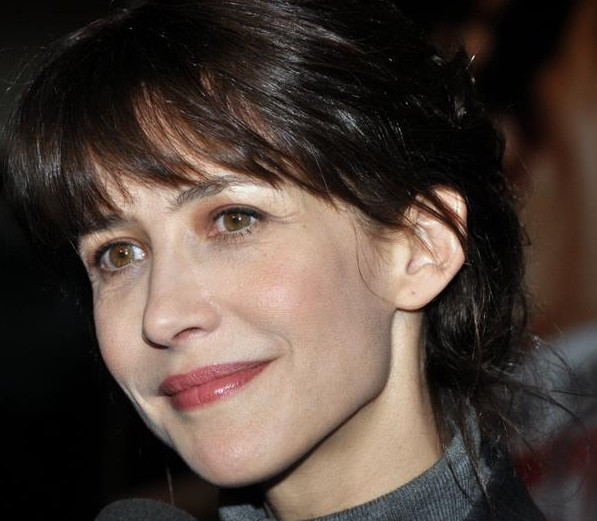
Marceau at the premiere of Arrêtez-moi, 2013

Since the early 2000s, Marceau has continued to appear in a wide variety of roles, mainly in French films, playing a widowed nurse in Nelly (À ce soir) in 2004, an undercover police agent in Anthony Zimmer in 2005, and the troubled daughter of a murdered film star in Trivial in 2007. In 2008, Marceau played a member of the French Resistance movement in Female Agents, and a struggling single mother in LOL (Laughing Out Loud). In 2009, she teamed up with Monica Bellucci in Don't Look Back about the mysterious connection between two women who have never met. In 2010, Marceau played a successful business executive forced to confront her unhappy childhood in With Love... from the Age of Reason (L'âge de raison).

In 2012, Marceau played a 40-something career woman who falls in love with a young jazz musician in Happiness Never Comes Alone. In 2013, she appeared in Arrêtez-moi (Arrest Me) as a woman who shows up at a police station and confesses to the murder of her abusive husband several years earlier.

She was selected to be on the jury for the main competition section of the 2015 Cannes Film Festival.

== Author and director ==
In 1996, Marceau published the semi-autobiographical novel, Menteuse (the English translation, Telling Lies, was published in 2001). Marceau's work was described as "an exploration of female identity".

In 2002, Marceau made her directorial debut in the feature film Speak to Me of Love, for which she was named Best Director at the Montreal World Film Festival. The film starred Judith Godrèche. It was her second directorial effort, following her nine-minute short film L'aube à l'envers in 1995, which also starred Godrèche. In 2007, she directed Trivial, her second feature film and in 2018 Mrs Mills.

== Advertising ==
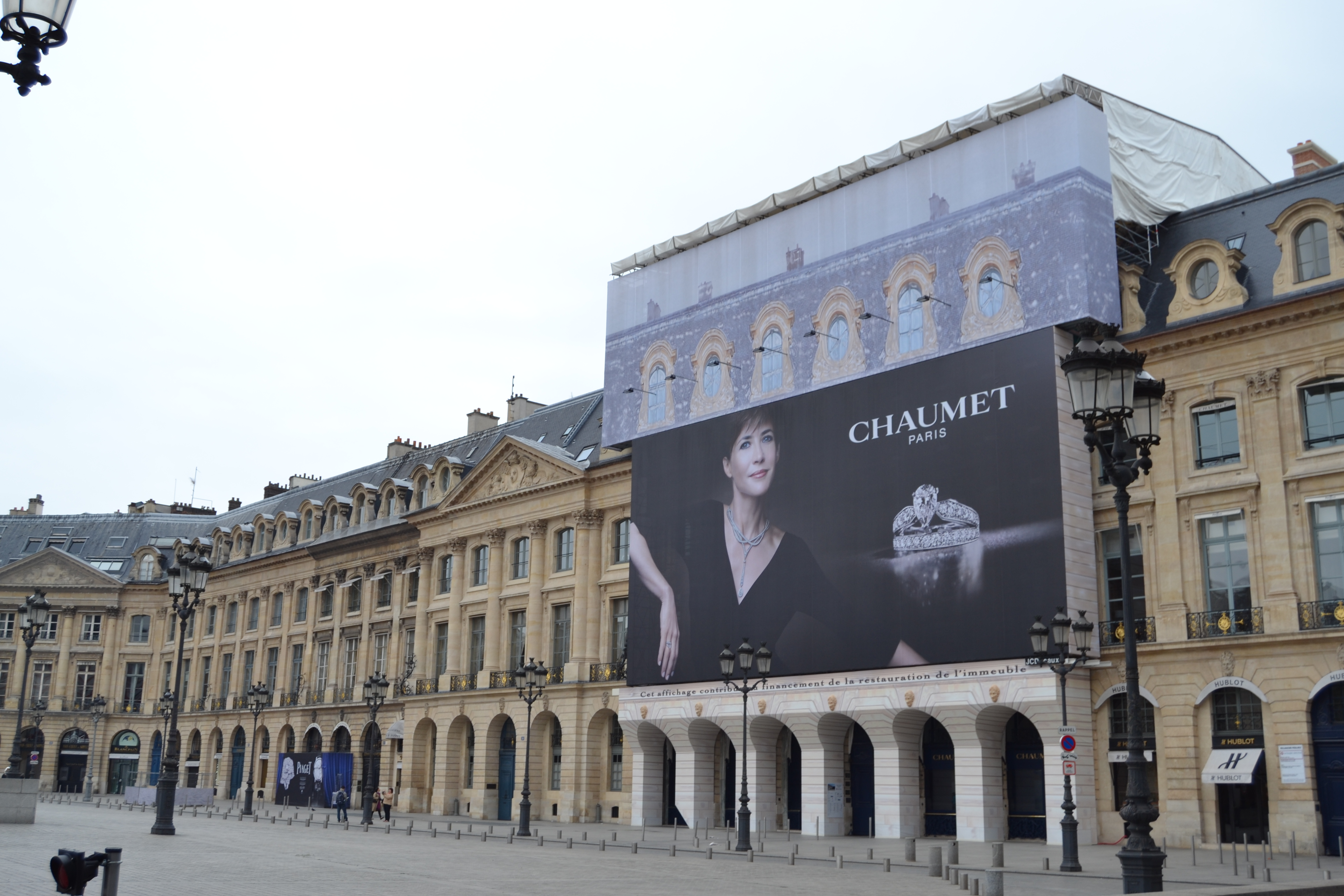
Place Vendôme, Chaumet showing Marceau in 2013

In the early stages of her career, she shot around a dozen television commercials and numerous national magazine covers in Japan and South Korea where she is famous since La Boum. Since 2008, Marceau is an international ambassador for high-end jeweller Chaumet based in Paris. Since 2014, she has been the ambassador of the DS 4, DS 5 and DS 6 cars (2010–2016) of the PSA Group with billboards and television commercials throughout Asia and especially in China.

== Personal life ==
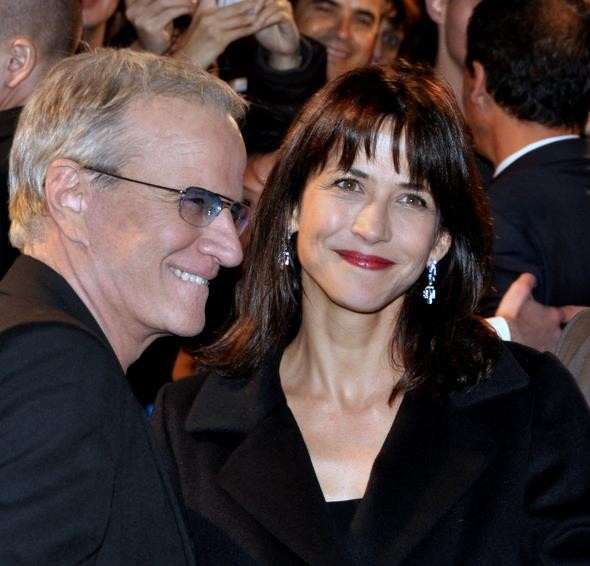
With her then-partner Christopher Lambert at the Skyfall Paris premiere in 2012

From 1985 to 2001, Marceau was in a relationship with Polish director Andrzej Żuławski. They have a son, born in 1995. In 2001, Marceau separated from Żuławski and began a six-year relationship with American producer Jim Lemley. They have a daughter, born in 2002.

Marceau also had a relationship with actor Christopher Lambert beginning in 2007, with whom she appeared in the films Trivial and Cartagena. They separated in July 2014. In 2016, for about 10 months, Marceau was in a relationship with the chef and restaurant owner Cyril Lignac. Marceau got together with theater director Richard Caillat in 2019, but their relationship ended in 2022.

Marceau is a classically trained cellist, as seen in the 1999 film Lost and Found. She is bilingual (French and English). She considers herself sapiosexual.

== Honours and awards ==
- 1983 César Award for Most Promising Actress for La Boum 2
- 1988 Cabourg Award for Best Actress for Chouans!
- 1988 Jupiter Award as best actress for Descente aux enfers
- 1991 Molière Award (theater) as best newcoming actress for Eurydice
- 2000 Cabourg Award for Best Actress for La fidélité
- 2000 Goldene Kamera for Film International
- 2000 Blockbuster Entertainment Award for Favorite Supporting Actress for The World Is Not Enough
- 2002 Montréal World Film Festival Award for Best Director for Speak to Me of Love
- 2002 Montréal World Film Festival Grand Prix Special des Amériques Nomination
- 2007 Montréal World Film Festival Grand Prix Special des Amériques
- 2008 Monte-Carlo Comedy Film Festival Jury Prize for LOL (Laughing Out Loud)

== Decorations ==
After having been made a Knight (French: Chevalier), Marceau was promoted to Officer (French: Officier) in the Ordre des Arts et des Lettres by the Minister of Culture of France in 2003. She received the rosette from the hands of Jean-Jacques Aillagon who declared:

"Female conqueror and ambitious actress. For millions of spectators, you embody freedom and revolt. Your career is part of the tradition of the greatest French actors, in the wake of Catherine Deneuve, Gérard Depardieu, Philippe Noiret or Jean-Paul Belmondo. You are a role model in our country and, abroad, you embody the image of the perfect French woman and for that you deserve the gratitude of the Republic".

In March 2016, she revealed that she had refused the Legion of Honour (French: Ordre national de la Légion d'honneur). Marceau reacted to then president François Hollande giving it to the then Crown Prince of Saudi Arabia Muhammad bin Nayef. In a tweet posted on 8 March 2016, Marceau wrote "This is why I refused the Legion of honour" with a link to an article from Le Monde titled "Saudi Arabia: Legion of Honour and Beheadings" which denounced the Wahhabi kingdom's repeated violations of numerous human rights such as the 70 executions carried out since the start of that year and its contempt for women's rights. Every year a few recipients decline the award, as Brigitte Bardot, Gustave Courbet, Guy de Maupassant, Jean-Paul Sartre, Georges Brassens and Maurice Ravel all did. However, even if they refuse to accept it, they are still automatically included in the order's official membership.

== Public image ==
Marceau is one of the most well-known Western actors in Asian countries such as Japan, South Korea and most importantly China, owing to her films, her countless local advertising campaigns and her role as a cultural ambassador of France in these countries since the 1980s. Marceau was invited to sing "La Vie en rose" in China in a duet with Liu Huan for the 2014 CCTV's New Year gala which was watched by over 700 million people ushering in the nation's week-long holiday. As of 2020 and since the 1990s, the circumlocution "the French people's favourite actress" (French: actrice préférée des Français) became a synonym for Marceau in media and the press as she has regularly topped most annual surveys and opinion polls determining it during that period.

== Filmography ==
=== Actress ===
Year	Title	Role	Notes
1980	La Boum	Vic Beretton	The Party
1982	La Boum 2	Vic Beretton	The Party 2
1984	Fort Saganne	Madeleine de Saint-Ilette	
1984	Happy Easter	Julie	Joyeuses Pâques
1985	L'amour braque	Mary	Mad Love
1985	Police	Noria	
1986	Descente aux enfers	Lola Kolber	Descent into Hell
1988	L'Étudiante	Valentine Ezquerra	The Student
1988	Chouans!	Céline	
1989	My Nights Are More Beautiful Than Your Days	Blanche	Mes nuits sont plus belles que vos jours
1990	Pacific Palisades	Bernardette	
1991	Pour Sacha	Laura	For Sacha
1991	La note bleue	Solange Sand	The Blue Note
1993	Fanfan	Fanfan	Fanfan & Alexandre
1994	Revenge of the Musketeers	Eloïse d'Artagnan	La fille de d'Artagnan; D'Artagnan's Daughter
1995	Braveheart	Isabella of France	
1995	Beyond the Clouds	The Girl in Portofino	Al di là delle nuvole
1997	Anna Karenina	Anna Karenina	
1997	Marquise	Marquise du Parc	
1997	Firelight	Élisabeth Laurier	
1999	Lost & Found	Lila Dubois	
1999	A Midsummer Night's Dream	Hippolyta	
1999	The World Is Not Enough	Elektra King	
2000	Fidelity	Clélia	La fidélité
2001	Belphegor, Phantom of the Louvre	Lisa	Belphégor – Le fantôme du Louvre
2003	Alex & Emma	Polina Delacroix	
2003	I'm Staying!	Marie-Dominique Delpire	
2003	Les clefs de bagnole	La clapman	The Car Keys
2004	Nelly	Nelly	À ce soir
2005	Anthony Zimmer	Chiara Manzoni	
2007	Trivial	Lucie / Victoria	La disparue de Deauville
2008	Female Agents	Louise Desfontaines	Les femmes de l'ombre
2008	LOL (Laughing Out Loud)	Anne	
2008	De l'autre côté du lit	Ariane Marciac	Changing Sides
2009	Don't Look Back	Jeanne No. 1	Ne te retourne pas
2009	Cartagena	Muriel	L'homme de chevet
2010	With Love... from the Age of Reason	Marguerite alias Margaret Flore	L'âge de raison
2012	Happiness Never Comes Alone	Charlotte	Un bonheur n'arrive jamais seul
2013	Arrêtez-moi	La coupable	Stop Me
2014	Quantum Love	Elsa	Une rencontre
2014	The Missionaries	Judith Chabrier	Tu veux ou tu veux pas Sex, Love & Therapy
2015	Jailbirds	Mathilde Leroy	La Taularde
2015	A Spiritual Matter	Viktoria	Une histoire d'âme
2018	Mrs. Mills	Helene	Madame Mills, une voisine si parfaite
2021	Everything Went Fine	Emmanuèle	Tout s'est bien passé
2022	I Love America	Lisa	
2022	Une femme de notre temps		Juliane Verbeeck

=== Director and writer ===
Year	Title	Notes
1995	L'aube à l'envers	
2002	Speak to Me of Love	Parlez-moi d'amour
2007	Trivial	La disparue de Deauville
2018	Mrs. Mills	Madame Mills, une voisine si parfaite
