= Lola Doillon =

French director and screenwriter

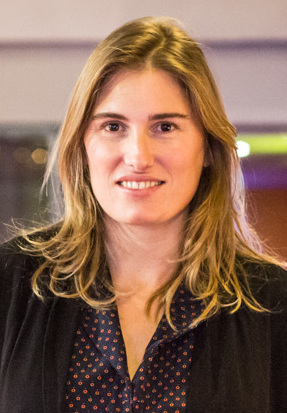
- Doillon in 2013
- Born: 9 January 1975 (age 51); Charenton-le-Pont, France
- Occupations: Director; screenwriter; actress
- Years active: 1979–present
- Spouse: Cédric Klapisch
- Children: 1
- Parents: Jacques Doillon (father); Noëlle Boisson (mother)
- Relatives: Lou Doillon (half-sister)

Lola Doillon (born 9 January 1975) is a French director and screenwriter.

== Biography ==
She has been very close to the film industry since her childhood, making her debut onscreen in her father's film La Femme qui pleure, and later working as a unit photographer on Le Jeune Werther. As an assistant director, she worked on the films Petits Frères, Carrément à l'ouest, and Raja, as well as on Cédric Klapisch's L'Auberge Espagnole in 2002.

After directing Et toi, t'es sur qui ? (released internationally as Just About Love) in 2007, her second feature film Contre toi (released internationally as In Your Hands), starring Kristin Scott Thomas and Pio Marmaï, was theatrically released in February 2011. The film is a chamber piece centered around Stockholm syndrome. On 26 July 2014, she married Cédric Klapisch. They have a son named Émile, born in 2007.

== Personal life ==
Doillon is the daughter of director Jacques Doillon and film editor Noëlle Boisson.

She is married to director Cédric Klapisch. They have a son, Émile, born in 2007.

== Filmography ==
Year	Title	Credited as			Notes
Year	Title	Director	Screenwriter	Other	Notes
1979	The Crying Woman			Yes	Actress
1983	Monsieur Abel			Yes	Telefilm; actress
1994	3000 scénarios contre un virus			Yes	Actress
1994	Du fond du cœur			Yes	Still photographer
1995	Noir comme le souvenir			Yes	Editor
1996	Le Vide dedans moi	Yes	Yes	Yes	Short film; also editor and actress
1996	Tout va mal			Yes	Short; still photographer
1996	Mieux vaut s'en aller la tête basse que les pieds devant			Yes	Short; still photographer
1996	Ponette			Yes	Casting director
1998	Jacques Doillon - Les mots, l'émotion			Yes	TV documentary; still photographer
1999	Petits Frères			Yes	First assistant director and casting director
1999	La Fatigue			Yes	Short film; actress
2001	Carrément à l'Ouest			Yes	First assistant director and casting director
2002	L'Auberge Espagnole			Yes	First assistant director
2003	Raja			Yes	First assistant director
2003	Not For, or Against (Quite the Contrary)			Yes	First assistant director
2005	Une majorette peut en cacher une autre	Yes	Yes		Short film
2005	L'Habit ne fait pas la majorette	Yes	Yes	Yes	Short film; also editor
2005	Faire contre mauvaise fortune, bonne majorette	Yes	Yes		Short film
2006	2 filles	Yes	Yes		Short film
2007	Et toi, t'es sur qui ?	Yes	Yes		Ljubljana International Film Festival - FIPRESCI Prize; Nominated—Cannes Film Festival - Prix Un Certain Regard; Nominated—Cannes Film Festival - Caméra d'Or; Nominated—César Award for Best First Feature Film
2008	X Femmes	Yes	Yes		TV series; episode "Se faire prendre au jeu"
2010	In Your Hands	Yes	Yes		
2015	Dix pour cent	Yes			TV mini-series; 2 episodes
2016	Fanny's Journey	Yes	Yes		
2023	Greek Salad	Yes	Yes		TV mini-series
