= L'Étudiante =

L'Étudiante may refer to:

- L'Étudiante (novel), a 1993 novel by Vanessa Duriès
- L'Étudiante (film), a 1988 film directed by Claude Pinoteau
