= Fanfan =

1993 French film by Alexandre Jardin

- Theatrical release poster
- Directed by: Alexandre Jardin
- Screenplay by: Alexandre Jardin
- Based on: Fanfan by Alexandre Jardin
- Produced by: Alain Terzian
- Starring: Sophie Marceau; Vincent Perez
- Cinematography: Jean-Yves Le Mener
- Edited by: Joëlle Hache; Claire Pinheiro
- Music by: Nicolas Jorelle
- Production companies: Gaumont; Alter Films; Canal+
- Distributed by: Gaumont Buena Vista International
- Release date: 16 June 1993 (France)
- Running time: 85 minutes
- Country: France
- Language: French

Fanfan (Fanfan & Alexandre) is a 1993 French romantic comedy film written and directed by Alexandre Jardin and starring Sophie Marceau and Vincent Perez. This film is based on the director's best-selling 1990 novel, which was translated into almost two dozen languages.

== Plot ==
Alexandre feels disillusioned with his fiancée, Laure, whose idea of romance is a pair of slippers for Valentine's Day. Their once passionate relationship has settled into monotony. To clear his mind, Alexandre visits the beach cottage of his friends Ti and Maude, where he meets Fanfan, Maude's granddaughter, a student studying to become a perfumer. Though they sleep in the same bed that night, Alexandre avoids any physical contact.

As the days pass, Alexandre and Fanfan grow closer. Fanfan takes him to an abandoned house where they share intimate conversations. Back at his apartment, Laure tries to reignite their relationship by dressing as an Italian call girl, but the attempt falls flat. Laure's father's gloomy talk of Alexandre joining the funeral business and the bleak future of marriage discourages him further.

Fanfan confesses to a friend that she's in love with Alexandre, but for him, things are more complex. He confides in Ti that all his relationships lose their magic once sex is involved. He proposes a solution: Platonic love. To preserve the excitement of unfulfilled desire, Alexandre vows to court Fanfan forever without revealing his feelings or engaging physically. He decides to stay with Laure physically while remaining emotionally connected to Fanfan.

Alexandre and Fanfan share a romantic evening, but when the owner of the apartment they’re using returns, they narrowly escape. Alexandre then creates a magical experience for Fanfan at a television studio, dancing with her in an 1813 Vienna set. However, when he toasts to their "friendship," Fanfan is disappointed and leaves to meet her friend Paul, a sculptor doing a nude study of her.

At home, Laure suspects Alexandre of seeing someone else. He admits it, but insists nothing will come of it. Laure begins planning their wedding, but Alexandre envisions them turning into her parents. Meanwhile, Fanfan, frustrated with Alexandre’s behavior, confronts him. She gives him an ultimatum: choose between her and Laure. Though Alexandre claims to want only friendship, Fanfan knows he is attracted to her.

One evening, Alexandre secretly adds sleeping powder to Fanfan's drink, and while she sleeps, he sensually applies sunscreen on her back. Just as he is about to kiss her, Laure arrives, announcing she is pregnant and the wedding plans are set. Disgusted, Fanfan leaves.

Later, Alexandre discovers that Laure lied about being pregnant, and they break up. He spots Fanfan boarding a bus to Italy but doesn’t chase after her. Ti warns him that Fanfan won’t wait forever. Determined, Alexandre rents the apartment next to hers and installs a two-way mirror to secretly watch her.

Back from Italy, Fanfan surprises Alexandre by bringing Paul along on a weekend trip, making him jealous. Alexandre admits that Laure's pregnancy was a lie, but Fanfan says it’s too late. She pretends to be marrying Paul to provoke Alexandre. He discovers the truth through the two-way mirror—Fanfan is still in love with him.

Fanfan confronts Alexandre, and he confesses that he didn’t chase the bus because he knew their relationship would eventually lose its spark. Fanfan gives him one last chance, telling him to come to her room by 10:00 pm or lose her forever. When he doesn't show up, she moves out, leaving a note that she’s going to see her sister. Alexandre is devastated when he learns from Maude that Fanfan’s sister is dead, implying Fanfan may be contemplating suicide. Just then, the mirror between them cracks, and Fanfan breaks through the barrier. They kiss, and Fanfan gives Alexandre until morning to win her back.

== Cast ==
- Sophie Marceau as Fanfan
- Vincent Perez as Alexandre
- Marine Delterme as Laure
- Gérard Séty as Ti
- Bruno Todeschini as Paul
- Micheline Presle as Maude
- Gérard Caillaud as Le père de Laure
- Thierry Lhermitte

== Reception ==
=== Box office ===
The film topped the box office on its opening weekend in France, playing at 204 screens and selling 188,577 admissions. In its opening week it grossed 6,341,843 French franc ($1.1 million). In total the film sold 1,020,679 tickets after its run in French theaters.

=== Critical response ===
Fanfan received mixed reviews. In his review in Films de France, James Travers found the first half of the film "unconvincing and painfully superficial in places," but thought the film improved significantly in the second half:

Compelling performances from Vincent Perez and Sophie Marceau transform what looks at first like a routine romantic comedy into something far richer, far more compassionate. The second part of the film also contains some moments of artistic brilliance, notably the Cocteau-esque sequence in which the two lovers attempt to make contact through a mirrored partition. Although there are a few unexplained gaps in the narrative—some more back story about Alexandre might have helped—writer-director Alexandre Jardin succeeds in weaving a tender love story that is both original and hauntingly poetic.
