= Beau Pere =

- French film poster, which caused controversy upon the film's release.
- Directed by: Bertrand Blier
- Written by: Bertrand Blier
- Produced by: Alain Sarde
- Starring: Patrick Dewaere; Ariel Besse; Nathalie Baye; Nicole Garcia; Maurice Ronet
- Cinematography: Sacha Vierny
- Edited by: Claudine Merlin
- Music by: Philippe Sarde
- Distributed by: Parafrance Films
- Release date: 16 September 1981
- Running time: 123 minutes
- Country: France
- Language: French

Beau Pere (French: Beau-père), also known as Stepfather, is a 1981 French comedy-drama film directed by Bertrand Blier, based on his novel of the same name. It stars Patrick Dewaere, Ariel Besse and Maurice Ronet and is about a 30-year-old pianist who has an affair with his 14-year-old stepdaughter after her mother dies in a car accident.

The film played at the 1981 Cannes Film Festival and had an international release. It received some positive reviews in spite of its controversial subject.

== Plot ==
Rémi is a struggling pianist with a wife, Martine, a model who is getting too old to find desirable work, and a 14-year-old stepdaughter, Marion. When Martine is killed in a car crash, Marion expresses her desire to stay with Rémi in their apartment, but is taken away by her father Charly, an alcoholic who dislikes Rémi. Marion comes back, much to her father's disapproval, and takes up babysitting to help make ends meet while Rémi gives piano lessons. Soon, Marion tells Rémi she is physically attracted to him, but he resists her advances because of her young age.

When Marion proves to be anemic, she is sent to the mountains with her father while Rémi loses his apartment and moves in with friends Simone and Nicolas. A broken man, he meets with Marion and they have sex in a hotel. She comes back to live with him in a run-down and condemned house, and although he first resists any more sex, gradually gives in. During a surprise visit, Charly at one point sees the two embrace. He asks them if they are having an affair, but when Rémi objects, Charly apologizes and leaves.

While babysitting a little girl, Nathalie, Marion finds she has developed the flu and rushes to Rémi for help. Rémi borrows money for the medicine, and while seeing the physician, meets Nathalie's mother, Charlotte. Rémi takes interest in Charlotte, who is also a skilled piano player, and begins pursuing her. Marion is disheartened as she wanted to stay with Rémi as her lover. Marion packs her belongings and leaves Rémi's place as she tells Charly that she intends to move back in with him. Although in emotional anguish over losing Marion, Rémi visits Charlotte in her apartment, and they have sex. They are unaware that Nathalie sees them.

== Cast ==
- Patrick Dewaere as Rémi
- Ariel Besse as Marion
- Nathalie Baye as Charlotte
- Nicole Garcia as Martine
- Maurice Ronet as Charly
- Geneviève Mnich as Simone
- Maurice Risch as Nicolas
- Macha Méril as Birthday Hostess
- Rose Thiéry as Mme Doullens, Landlord's wife
- Pierre Le Rumeur as Pediatrician
- Yves Gasc as M. Doullens, Landlord
- Michel Berto as Professor
- Catherine Alcover as Emergency Doctor
- Henri-Jacques Huet as Restaurant manager
- Jacques Rispal as Taxi driver
- Maurice Biraud as Truck driver, accident witness
- Joseph Michael Roth as Marion's friend (uncredited)
- Sandy Whitelaw as The father of the young girl (birthday) (uncredited)

== Themes ==
Author Rémi Fournier Lanzoni remarked on Blier's filmography generally taking the position of "a very conscientous [sic] observer of psychological conflicts". Lanzoni found traces of Blier's "confrontational" style in Beau Pere. Critic Peter Cowie wrote it displayed exploration of "Blier's recurrent theme of a free, guiltless sexuality in which the men are finally found wanting". The element of incest in a 14-year-old girl seducing her stepfather also raises questions of immorality.

Film Professor Sue Harris wrote Beau Pere features Blier's experimentation with fourth wall-breaking monologues from characters, with Rémi giving a lengthy address to the audience in an ironic tone reminiscent of film noir. The monologue offers omniscience, and conflicts with narrative. Harris added the way Rémi also identifies himself as "le pianist" fits Blier's tendency to identify characters in flat ways, creating expectations from the audience.

== Production ==
=== Development ===
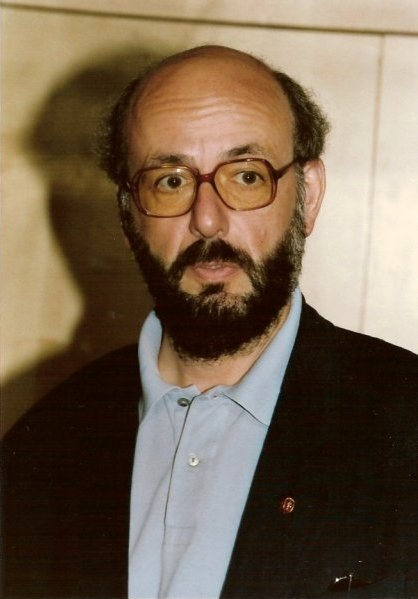
Director Bertrand Blier based his film on his novel of the same name.

Writer and director Bertrand Blier declared Beau Pere was intended as "an ode to the fair sex and to womanhood in its purest form". Like Blier's earlier film Going Places (1974), he based it on a novel he had written, also titled Beau-père.

The film was shot in Sèvres and Ville-d'Avray. The bass played by Maurice Risch's character is performed by musician Stéphane Grappelli.

=== Casting ===
The film stars Patrick Dewaere, and is one of his last films. He had appeared in Blier's films before, though never without Gérard Depardieu. Actress Nathalie Baye described her role as small, but said working with Blier and producer Alain Sarde was educational, and Blier managed to both listen to others while having a vision of what he wanted to shoot.

Beau Pere also stars Ariel Besse in her first film role, and she was 15 at the time. Although she is nude in the film, her parents gave approval, saying she was treated sensitively. Besse secured the role after Sophie Marceau turned it down.

=== Filming ===
The scene in which Besse had to walk around naked, showing her buttocks, was not included in the script. At first, she did not want to play it, but in the end, she agreed, on the condition that Blier let the whole crew out.

== Release ==
The film was entered into the Cannes Film Festival in May 1981. It had a total of 1,197,816 admissions in France, with Blier claiming the poster chosen by the distributor was awkward and discouraged the public from seeing the film. Besse's parents sued the distributors and producers over the poster, which shows Besse's breasts, as it was placed on billboards around France without their permission. The judge favoured the producers, saying the film was more revealing than the poster. Beau Pere was among Blier's least commercially successful films.

The film played at the New York Film Festival in October 1981. The film was released in the U.K. as Stepfather and in the U.S. as Beau Pere. In Canada, the film was banned in the province of Ontario but approved for Quebec and British Columbia, and was a particularly controversial case concerning censorship and community standards.

== Reception ==
=== Critical reception ===
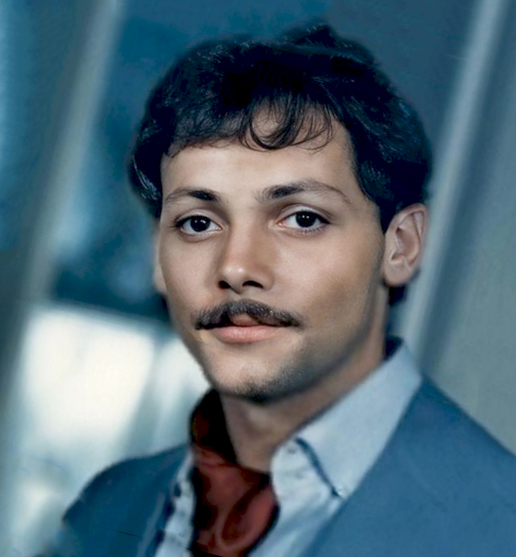
Critics praised the performances of Ariel Besse and Patrick Dewaere, who was nominated for the César Award for Best Actor.

The film has received positive reviews. Dave Kehr of the Chicago Reader observes similarities to Lolita and says Beau Pere "has enough of Blier's customary taboo-busting vigor to provide a reasonably unsettling good time". Janet Maslin of The New York Times wrote in 1981 that despite the objectionable subject matter, "Mr. Blier tells this story very gently, with as much attention to the humor of the situation as to its eroticism". She also stated Besse played the character as an "extremely changeable creature, childish one minute and precocious the next". People called the film convincing and touching, and in spite of the topic, not pornographic. Lloyd Paseman, writing for The Register-Guard, compared the film to Blier's earlier Get Out Your Handkerchiefs in its subject matter, but said Beau Pere was better, with Dewaere being "excellent" and Besse being "The main reason to see Beau Pere", comparing her to Brooke Shields. Conversely, David Denby of New York magazine panned the film as "heavy-handed and sluggish".

In his 2002 Movie & Video Guide, Leonard Maltin gives the film three and a half stars and calls it thoughtful and sensitive. James Berardinelli of ReelViews credits the film with a "provocative script featuring well-defined characters and a pair of powerful performances". Time Out dismissed the film as "polite porn", while Voir magazine notes the film may be shocking decades later. Rotten Tomatoes counted four favourable reviews out of five.

=== Accolades ===
Beau Pere competed for the Palme d'Or at Cannes, but did not win. Lanzoni highlighted Beau Pere and Série noire in noting Dewaere never received the César Award for Best Actor.

Award	Date of ceremony	Category	Recipient(s)	Result	Ref(s)
Boston Society of Film Critics	29 January 1982	Best Foreign Language Film	Beau Pere, shared with Taxi zum Klo	Won	
César Awards	27 February 1982	Best Actor	Patrick Dewaere	Nominated	
