= The Disenchanted (film) =

- Directed by: Benoît Jacquot
- Written by: Benoît Jacquot; Judith Godrèche
- Produced by: Laurent Pétin; Michèle Pétin
- Starring: Judith Godrèche; Ivan Desny
- Cinematography: Benoît Delhomme
- Edited by: Dominique Auvray
- Music by: Jorge Arriagada
- Distributed by: ARP Sélection
- Release date: 1990
- Running time: 78 minutes
- Country: France
- Language: French

The Disenchanted is a 1990 French drama film about a college student who, feeling dissatisfied with her mother and no good boyfriend, enters into a relationship with a married older man
