= Taïro =

French singer, songwriter of dancehall reggae

- Born: Ismaël Jolé-Ménébhi; 5 February 1978 (age 48); Paris, France
- Genres: Dancehall, Reggae
- Years active: 2005–present
- Member of: Youthmen Ten

Ismaël Jolé-Ménébhi better known by the stage name Taïro (born in Paris on 5 February 1978), is a French singer, songwriter of dancehall reggae. He has released three albums, Chœurs et âme in 2009, Ainsi soit-il in 2013, and Reggae Français in 2016, in addition to 4 street tapes.

He was born of in Paris in 1978. After his parents divorced, he went on to live with his mother in the Xe arrondissement. His first artistic role was in the 1991 film Le Jeune Werther directed by Jacques Doillon when he was just 13. He was also exposed to reggae music at school and he embraced the trend and performed in school events and in 1993 formed his band Youthmen Ten taking the stage name Taïro ("Tyro") meaning a novice or beginner. In 1996, he appeared under the pseudonym Wicked Dread, in the track "Quel F*cky" by the group Section Fu on the EP Mortal Kombat. Beginning of the 2000s, Yothmen Ten disbanded.

in 2000, he was released the single "Millénaire featuring One Shot. It reached number 35 in France. He gained critical acclaim through his interpretation of Herbie Hancock's "Watermelon Man". He collaborated with Faf Larage in "Mea Culpa" also in 2000. In addition, he sang a number of Jamaican traditional hits. Through the support of Akhenaton, his music found its way in the soundtrack for Taxi 2. Other collaborations include tracks on albums by Nuttea, Assassin, Faf Larage in the album Rap Stories, Bakar in his album Rose de betton, he was featured on German rap group Massive Töne's track "Geld oder Liebe" (DE #45) and a joint single with Flya in "Elle veut". He was famous for "J'irai cracher sur ta tombe" with Disiz la Peste.

In 2009, Taïro released his own debut studio album Chœurs et Âme. The track "Mama" was dedicated to his mother and her sacrifices for him.

== Discography ==
=== Albums ===
Year	Album	Peak positions	Certifications
Year	Album	FRA	Certifications
2009	Chœurs et âme	56	
2013	Ainsi soit-il	17	
2016	Reggae Français	33	
2017	Summer Tape	115	

=== Street tapes ===
Year	Title	Peak positions	Certifications
Year	Title	FRA	Certifications
2007	Street Tape	—	
2011	Street Tape Vol. 2	174	
2012	Street Tape Vol. 3	136	

=== Singles ===
Year	Single	Peak positions	Album
Year	Single	FRA	Album
2000	"Millénaire" (featuring One Shot)	35	

== Filmography ==
- 1991: Le Jeune Werther as Ismaël (credited as Ismaël Jolé-Ménébhi, his birth name)
