= Christopher Lambert =

American actor (born 1957)

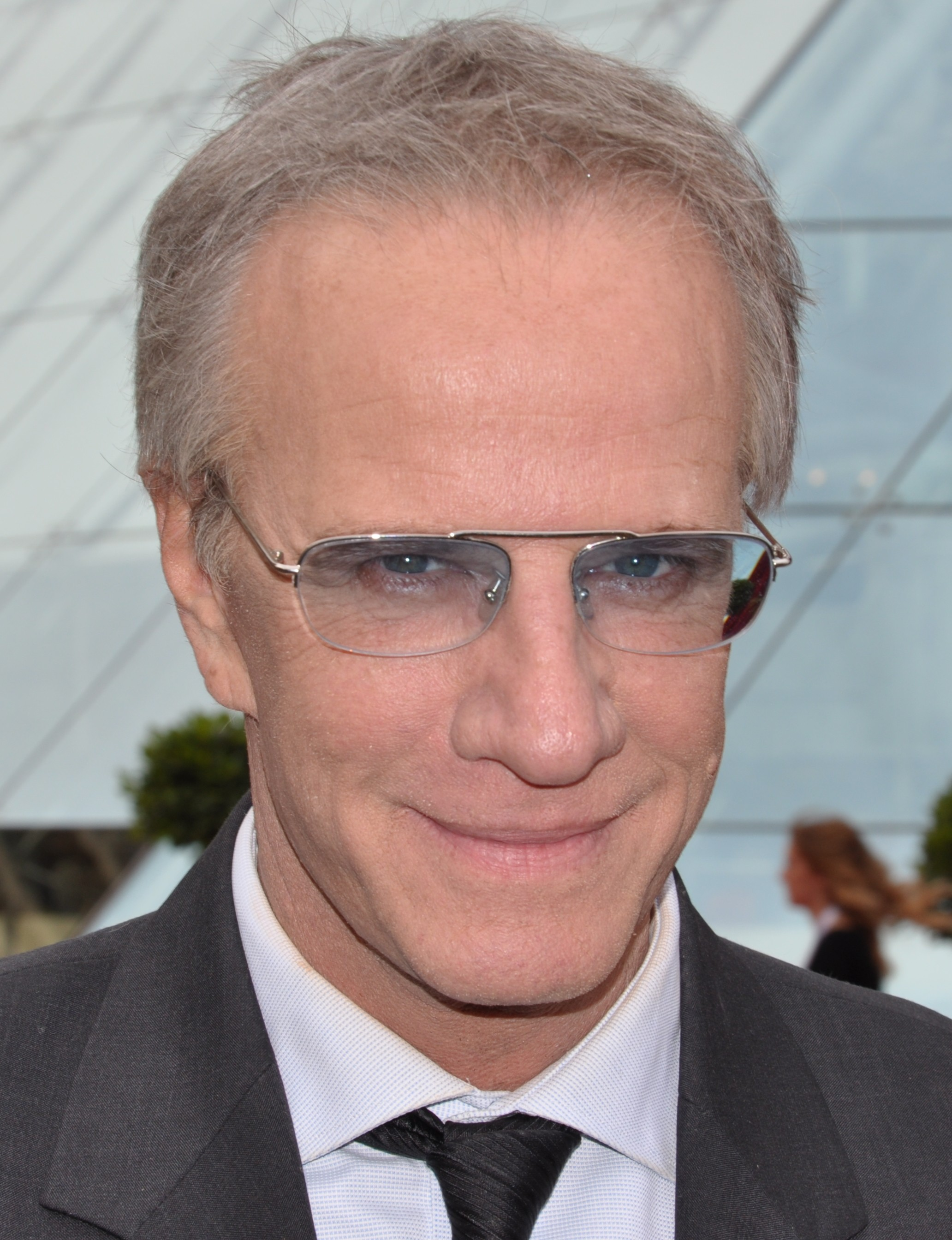
- Lambert in 2013
- Born: Christophe Guy Denis Lambert; March 29, 1957 (age 69); Manhasset, New York, U.S.
- Occupations: Actor; producer; writer
- Years active: 1979–present
- Spouses: Diane Lane (m. 1988; div. 1994) Jaimyse Haft (m. 1999; div. 2000)
- Partner: Sophie Marceau (2007–2014)
- Children: 1

Christophe Guy Denis Lambert (/ˈlæmbərt/; French: [lɑ̃bɛʁ]; born March 29, 1957), often credited as Christopher Lambert, is an American actor and film producer. He started his career playing supporting parts in several French films, and became internationally famous for portraying Tarzan in Greystoke: The Legend of Tarzan, Lord of the Apes (1984). For his performance in the film Subway (1985), he received the César Award for Best Actor. He is known for his role as Connor MacLeod in the adventure-fantasy film Highlander (1986) and the subsequent television and film franchise of the same title, Raiden in Mortal Kombat (1995), Methodius in Ghost Rider: Spirit of Vengeance (2011), and Arne Seslum in Hail, Caesar! (2016). He also served as executive producer for Nine Months (1995).

== Early life ==
Christophe Guy Denis Lambert was born in Great Neck, New York, on March 29, 1957, the son of Yolande Agnès Henriette and Georges Lambert-Lamond, a French diplomat at the United Nations. His father was Jewish. Due to his father's work, Lambert moved with his parents to Switzerland at the age of two, and was raised in Geneva, where he attended the International School of Geneva and the Institut Florimont until his teenage years, when the family moved to France and settled in Paris. Lambert's debut in acting was in a school play age 12.

== Career ==
Director Hugh Hudson and Warner Brothers chose Lambert, wanting an unknown actor to play Tarzan, a human raised by apes in the jungle. Lambert got the role beating out Viggo Mortensen partly thanks to his myopia, because when he took off his glasses it seemed he was always looking into the distance. Released in 1984, Greystoke: The Legend of Tarzan, Lord of the Apes, was nominated for many awards. Also that year, Lambert starred opposite Catherine Deneuve in Love Songs.

He played the lead in Luc Besson's stylistic film Subway (1985), about a man being hunted in the underground subways of Paris.

In 1986, Lambert appeared in Highlander the role for which he would be best known. In the film, Lambert starred as Connor MacLeod, an immortal warrior who could be killed only by decapitation. Lambert was cast in the role after Kurt Russell dropped out of the film and after director Russell Mulcahy saw a picture of him in a magazine. Despite barely speaking English, Lambert spent weeks learning the language before filming with a dialect coach. The film became a cult hit and was an international box-office success, rock group Queen composed and performed the soundtrack, and Lambert also appeared as MacLeod in the music video for Queen's "Princes of the Universe". In 1987, Lambert played the leading role of Salvatore Giuliano in The Sicilian, directed by Michael Cimino. In 1988, he starred in Agnieszka Holland's To Kill a Priest, in which he played a character based on Jerzy Popiełuszko and his murder under the Polish communist regime.

In 1991, Highlander II: The Quickening premiered, reuniting Lambert with director Russell Mulcahy and fellow actor Sean Connery. Shot in Argentina (which was going through a financial crisis) to reduce production costs, much of the script was not filmed and the final result was a patchwork. It was said Lambert threatened to walk out of the project when it was nearing fruition. However, due to contractual obligations, he reconsidered. In 1992, he appeared in three projects. He appeared in the first episode of the television show Highlander: The Series, passing on the lead role to actor Adrian Paul. He also appeared in the French crime thriller Max et Jérémie, co-starring Philippe Noiret and Jean-Pierre Marielle.

In 1993, Carl Schenkel's suspense thriller Knight Moves premiered, in which Lambert was both an executive producer and the lead. Lambert plays a chess grandmaster suspected of murder. Later that year, Stuart Gordon's science fiction film Fortress premiered, with Lambert playing the lead. The story takes place in a dystopian future where a man and his wife are sent to a maximum-security prison because they are expecting a second child, which is against the strict one-child policy.

1994 saw the release of two collaborations with actor Mario Van Peebles. They played the side by side leads in the action film Gunmen, and Van Peebles was the main villain in Highlander III: The Sorcerer. In this third installment of the franchise, Connor MacLeod is forced to face a new, dangerous enemy, a powerful sorcerer known as Kane who wants to gain world domination. Lambert also starred in the action film Roadflower. In France, he produced his second Patrick Braoudé film called Neuf mois, which was nominated for two Césars.

In 1995, he played the role of the thunder god Raiden in the Paul W. S. Anderson's movie adaptation of the popular video game series Mortal Kombat. The plot of the film follows the warrior monk Liu Kang, the actor Johnny Cage, and the soldier Sonya Blade, all three guided by the god Raiden, on their journey to combat the evil sorcerer Shang Tsung and his forces in a tournament to save Earth. Lambert later reprised the role in the MK Movie Skin Pack in the 2020 game Mortal Kombat 11. Also that year, he also starred in the American-Japanese martial arts action film The Hunted, directed by J. F. Lawton, with a cast that included John Lone, Joan Chen, Yoshio Harada, and Yoko Shimada, and produced Xavier Beauvois's Don't Forget You're Going to Die, which won the Special Jury Award at the Gijón International Film Festival, won the Prix Jean Vigo, won the Jury Prize and was nominated for the Palme d'Or at the Cannes Film Festival. Lambert was also an executive producer on Chris Columbus' Nine Months, an English-language remake of Neuf mois.

In 1996, Lambert was an executive producer and the lead in Nils Gaup's western film North Star, co-starring James Caan. The same year he was a producer of When Saturday Comes, a football sport drama starring Sean Bean. In 1997, he starred in Gabriele Salvatores' cyberpunk science fiction film Nirvana. The film tells the story of a virtual reality game designer, played by Lambert, who discovers that the main character of his game has achieved sentience due to an attack by a computer virus. The film was screened out of competition at the Cannes Film Festival. The same year, he also co-lead with Ice-T in the action film Mean Guns, and starred in the French film Arlette by Claude Zidi.

In 1998, he produced and starred in Operation Splitsville, a remake of Génial, mes parents divorcent, which he produced several years earlier. The same year, he produced and played a man with a mental disability, who moved into a nursing home, in the film Gideon. In 1999, he produced and starred in Russell Mulcahy's Resurrection, where he plays a detective who is assigned to investigate the savage murder of a man who has bled to death from a severed arm. He also starred in science fantasy-action film Beowulf. In 2000, he played in the fourth installment of the Highlander franchise, Highlander: Endgame. The film reunited him with Adrian Paul, and would be last sequel Lambert appeared in. The same year, he was still on the run from authorities in the sequel Fortress 2: Re-Entry.

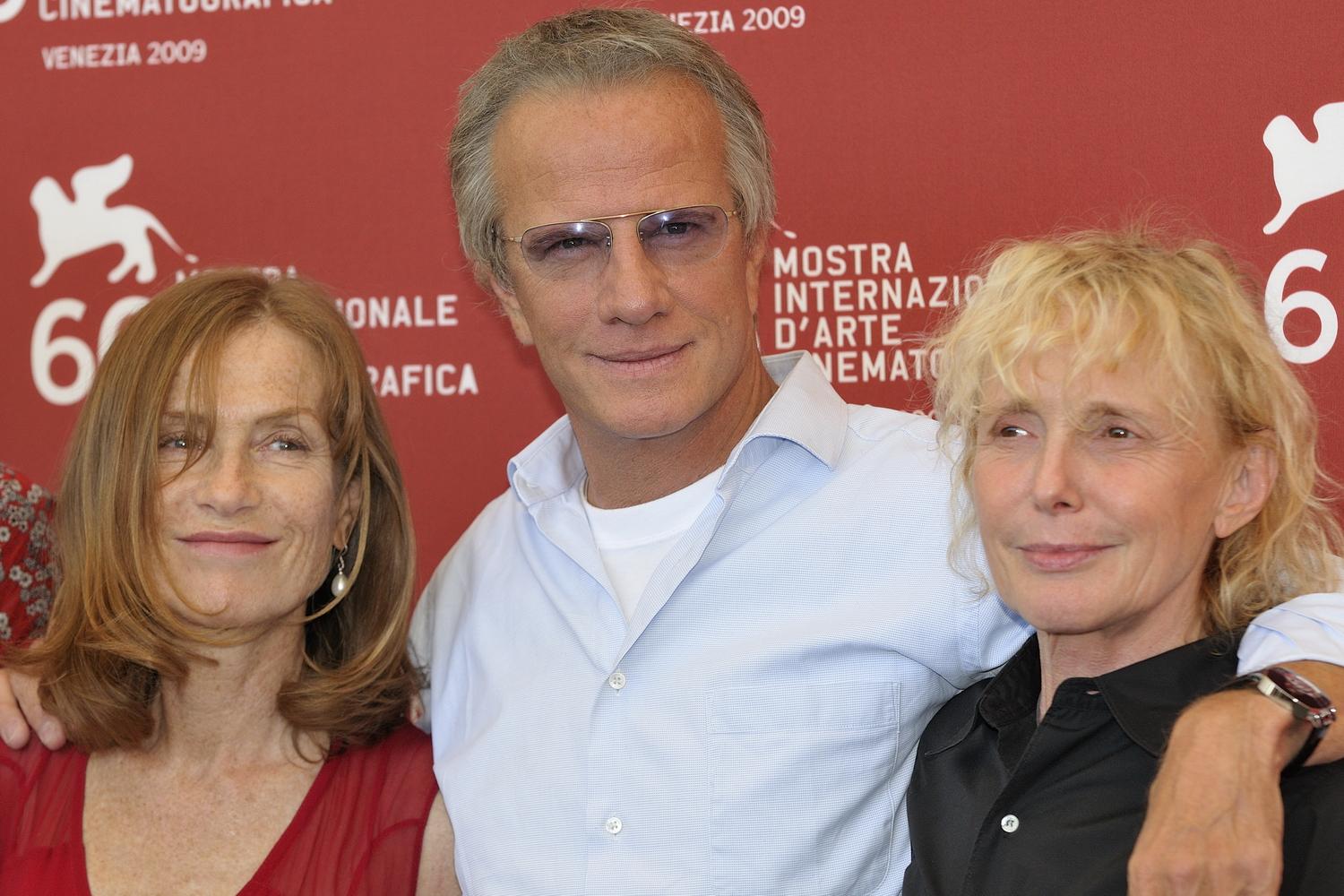
Lambert, Isabelle Huppert, and Claire Denis at the 66th Venice Film Festival 2009

He also starred in John Glen's The Point Men, about a team of Israeli agents being killed off one-by-one after a botched anti-terrorist operation. In 2003, he played in Absolon, a post-apocalyptic science fiction thriller film. He was an executive producer on the film The Confessor (also known as The Good Shepherd) starring Christian Slater, Molly Parker, and Stephen Rea. In 2006, he was an executive producer and star on the film Day of Wrath. He also played a supporting role in Richard Kelly's Southland Tales.

In 2007, he starred in the vampire film Metamorphosis. He starred in the Sophie Marceau directed French film Trivial. In 2009, Lambert was a lead in Claire Denis' White Material; both the film and Lambert's performance received critical acclaim. The film stars Isabelle Huppert as a struggling French coffee producer in an unnamed French speaking African country, who decides to stay at her coffee plantation in spite of an erupting civil war. The film has appeared on a number of critics' top ten lists of the best films of 2010. That year, he also acted in Cartagena, with Sophie Marceau starring as a beautiful, free-spirited woman who becomes bedridden following a terrible accident. Against her better judgement, she hires a drunk middle-aged former boxer (Lambert) to cook and care for her. Although unqualified for the position, he is desperate for work, and slowly he wins the trust of the woman, who teaches him how to read. The film also won several awards in France.

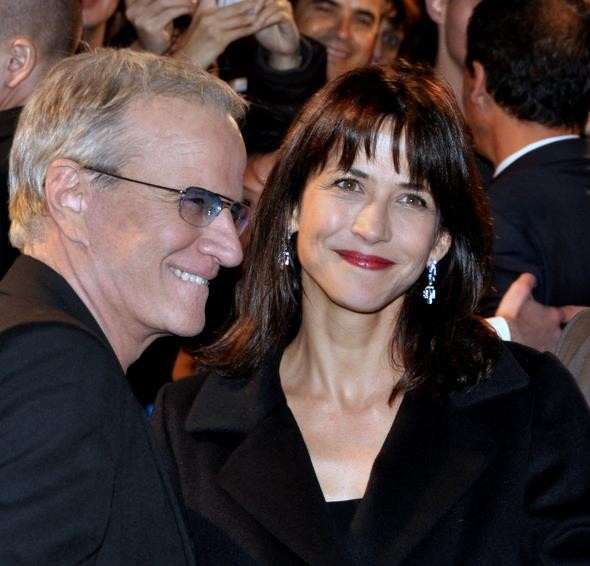
Lambert with Sophie Marceau in October 2012

In 2011, Lambert starred as the villainous head monk Methodius in the Ghost Rider sequel Ghost Rider: Spirit of Vengeance, starring Nicolas Cage, in 2011. He underwent sword training for three months and shaved his head. The film made $132.6 million worldwide. Shortly afterwards, he got the role of Marcel Janvier (alias "The Chameleon"), a recurring villain in award-winning hit police crime TV drama NCIS: Los Angeles. His character was in six episodes from 2012 to 2013 – the two highest-rated seasons of the show.

In 2014, he played in the biographical crime drama film Electric Slide, about the Los Angeles-based bank robber Eddie Dodson. In 2015, he co-starred in Claude Lelouch's Un plus une, a French romantic comedy film. He also co-starred in the biographical film 10 Days in a Madhouse, about the experiences of undercover journalist Nellie Bly. In 2016 he co-starred in Hail, Caesar!, a comedy film written, produced, edited, and directed by Joel and Ethan Coen. It is a fictional story that follows the real-life "fixer" Eddie Mannix (Josh Brolin) working in the Hollywood film industry in the 1950s, trying to discover what happened to a cast member who vanished during the filming of a biblical epic. That year, he cameoed as a French Army Captain in La folle histoire de Max et Léon, a French World War II comedy film. He also had a recurring role in the Russian-Portuguese biographical television show Mata Hari. That year, he also played the lead villain in the martial arts film Kickboxer: Retaliation.

Lambert plays the role of SS officer Karl Frenzel in the Russian film Sobibor by director Konstantin Khabensky, which was released in 2018. The film is a World War II drama about the only successful uprising in a Nazi death camp. It was selected as the Russian entry for the Best Foreign Language Film at the 91st Academy Awards. Lambert received high praise for "an outstanding and nuanced performance; he is unrecognisable as Frenzel, a demonic, fractured character".

Lambert was part of the ensemble cast of Bel Canto from director Paul Weitz, an adaptation of the 2002 novel of the same name, by Ann Patchett. Lambert played the role of a French ambassador who was part of the Japanese embassy hostage crisis (also called the Lima Crisis) of 1996–1997 in Lima, Peru. Lambert received praise, along with the rest of the cast, for "performances [that] are uniformly excellent".

== Other ventures ==
Lambert has written two novels: La fille porte-bonheur in 2011 and Le juge in 2015.

Along with owning a mineral water business and food processing plant, Lambert produces Côtes du Rhône wines with his business partner Eric Beaumard at a vineyard in Sainte-Cécile-les-Vignes. The label, Les Garrigues de Beaumard-Lambert, tops out at 4,000 cases and is sold mostly in Europe. Beaumard has primary creative control of the winery, but Lambert conducts barrel tests and monitors the various stages of the wine's evolution.

== Personal life ==
Lambert was married to American actress Diane Lane from 1988 until their divorce in 1994. Their daughter was born in 1993. They starred together in 1992 film Knight Moves. Lambert married American actress Jaimyse Haft in 1999, and they divorced in 2000. From 2007 to 2014, he dated French actress Sophie Marceau.

Lambert has severe myopia and cannot see without his glasses. He cannot wear contact lenses and often has to perform while virtually blind, which has led to injuries while performing his own stunts.

== Filmography ==
Year	Title	Role	Language	Notes
1979	Ciao, les mecs	Thug at the dance party	French	Credited as Christophe Lambert
1980	The Telephone Bar	Paul "Bébé" Franchi	French	as Christophe Lambert
1981	Douchka		French	TV film
1981	Asphalte	Un médecin à l'hôpital / The doctor	French	as Christophe Lambert
1981	Une sale affaire	Mullard	French	as Christophe Lambert
1981	Putain d'histoire d'amour	Inspecteur de police	French	as Christophe Lambert
1982	Légitime violence	Jockey	French	as Christophe Lambert
1982	Cinéma 16: La Dame de cœur	Marcel	French	TV series episode
1984	Greystoke: The Legend of Tarzan, Lord of the Apes	John Clayton / Tarzan	English	
1985	Paroles et Musique	Jeremy	French	as Christophe Lambert
1985	Subway	Fred	French	César Award for Best Actor as Christophe Lambert
1986	Highlander	Connor MacLeod	English	
1986	I Love You	Michel	French	as Christophe Lambert
1987	The Sicilian	Salvatore Giuliano	English	
1988	Priceless Beauty (a.k.a. Love Dream)	Menrou	English	
1988	To Kill a Priest	Father Alek	English	
1990	Why Me?	Gus Cardinale	English	
1991	Highlander II: The Quickening	Connor MacLeod	English	
1992	Knight Moves	Peter Sanderson	English	
1992	Highlander: The Series	Connor MacLeod	English	TV (one episode)
1992	Max et Jérémie	Jeremie Kolachowsky	French	as Christophe Lambert
1992	Fortress	John Henry Brennick	English	
1993	Loaded Weapon 1	Man with Car Phone	English	Deleted scene, uncredited
1994	Gunmen	Dani Servigo	English	
1994	Roadflower	Jack	English	
1994	Highlander III: The Sorcerer	Connor MacLeod / Russell Nash	English	
1995	The Hunted	Paul Racine	English	
1995	Nine Months	—	English	Executive producer
1995	Mortal Kombat	Raiden	English	
1996	North Star	Hudson Saanteek	English	as Christophe Lambert
1996	Adrenalin: Fear the Rush	Lemieux	English	
1996	Hercule et Sherlock	Vincent	French	as Christophe Lambert
1997	Nirvana	Jimi Dini	Italian	
1997	Arlette	Frank Martin	French	as Christophe Lambert
1997	Mean Guns	Lou	English	
1999	Operation Splitsville	Max, P.E. Teacher	English	
1999	Resurrection	John Prudhomme	English	also writer
1999	Beowulf	Beowulf	English	
1999	Gideon	Gideon Oliver Dobbs	English	
2000	Fortress 2: Re-Entry	John Henry Brennick	English	
2000	Highlander: Endgame	Connor MacLeod	English	
2001	Aparté			Short film
2001	Druids	Vercingetorix	English	as Christophe Lambert
2001	Mazinkaiser	Additional Voices		Video game
2001	The Point Men	Tony Eckhardt	English	
2002	King of Bandit Jing	Additional Voices		TV miniseries, credited as Chris Lambert
2002	The Piano Player	Alex Laney	English	
2003	Absolon	Detective Norman Scot	English	
2003	Janis and John	Léon	French	
2004	À ton image	Thomas	French	
2005	Dalida	Richard Chanfray, Comte de Saint-Germain	French	TV miniseries
2006	Day of Wrath	Ruy de Mendoza	English	
2006	Southland Tales	Walter Mung	English	
2006	Le Lièvre de Vatanen	Tom Vatanen	French	as Christophe Lambert
2007	Metamorphosis	Constantine Thurzo	English	
2007	Trivial	Jacques	French	as Christophe Lambert
2008	The Chauffeur (Kierowca)	Devereaux	Polish	
2009	White Material	Andre Vial	French	as Christophe Lambert
2009	Les Associés	Philippe Kaminski	French	TV film, credited as Christophe Lambert
2009	Cartagena	Leo	French	as Christophe Lambert
2010	Das Geheimnis der Wale	Chris Cassell	German	TV film
2011	Ghost Rider: Spirit of Vengeance	Methodius	English	
2013	Blood Shot	The President	English	
2012–2013	NCIS: Los Angeles	Marcel Janvier / The Chameleon	English	TV series (6 episodes)
2014	Electric Slide	Roy Fortune	English	
2015	Un plus une	Samuel Hamon	French	
2016	Hail, Caesar!	Arne Slessum	English	
2016	La folle histoire de Max et Léon	Captain Lassard	French	Also co-produced
2017	Mothers		English	Film
2017	Mata Hari	Gustav Kramer	Russian	TV miniseries
2017	Everyone's Life	Antoine de Vidas	French	
2017	Call My Agent!	Himself	French	TV series (1 episode)
2018	Kickboxer: Retaliation	Thomas Moore	English	
2018	Sobibor	Karl Frenzel	Russian	Russian Holocaust film
2018	Bel Canto	Simon Thibault	English	
2019	The Blacklist	Bastien Moreau / The Corsican	English	TV series
2019	Dottoressa Giò	Sergio Monti	Italian	TV series
2020	Capitaine Marleau	Thierry Bégodeau	French	TV series
2024	Falla Girare 2: Offline		Italian	
2025	The Creeps		English	

=== Video games ===
Year	Title	Role	Language	Notes
2020	Mortal Kombat 11	Raiden ("Earthrealm")	English	Voice and model based on his past performance as the character in the 1995 live action film
