= In Your Hands (2010 film) =

- Film poster
- French: Contre toi
- Directed by: Lola Doillon
- Starring: Kristin Scott Thomas; Pio Marmaï
- Release date: 23 October 2010 (BFI London Film Festival)
- Running time: 81 minutes
- Country: France
- Language: French

In Your Hands (French: Contre toi) is a 2010 French drama film directed by Lola Doillon. The film premiered at the 2010 BFI London Film Festival.

== Synopsis ==
A young man kidnaps and holds captive the obstetrician-gynecologist who, two years earlier, performed a cesarean section on his wife, who did not survive. An ambiguous relationship develops between them.

== Cast ==
- Kristin Scott Thomas as Anna Cooper
- Pio Marmaï as Yann
- Jean-Philippe Écoffey as Policier déposition
- Marie-Sohna Condé as Caroline
- Marie-Christine Orry as Concierge
- Vinciane Millereau as Milène
- Jean-Louis Tribes as Michel
