= Max et Jérémie =

1992 film by Claire Devers

- Directed by: Claire Devers
- Screenplay by: Teri White (novel Max Trueblood and the Jersey Desperado); Claire Devers; Bernard Stora
- Produced by: Alain Sarde
- Starring: Christopher Lambert; Philippe Noiret
- Cinematography: Bruno de Keyzer
- Edited by: Marie Castro-Vasquez
- Music by: Philippe Sarde
- Distributed by: AMLF
- Release date: 1992
- Running time: 115 minutes
- Country: France
- Language: French
- Budget: $7.6 million
- Box office: $4.7 million

Max et Jérémie (also known as Max and Jeremy) is a 1992 film starring Christopher Lambert and Philippe Noiret.

== Plot ==
Jeremie is a small time crook who blows up places and people for Paris mobsters. He gets his chance to move up in the underworld when he is hired to kill a retired hitman, Max, who knows too much to be left alive. But Jeremie is unable to kill Max who unexpectedly develops a fondness for him.

== Cast ==
- Philippe Noiret as Robert 'Max' Maxendre
- Christopher Lambert as Jeremie Kolachowsky
- Jean-Pierre Marielle as Almeida
- Abdelhak Bouhout as Boy
- Feodor Chaliapin Jr. as Sam Marberg
- Jean-Pierre Miquel as Maubuisson
- José Quaglio as Eugène Agopian
- Michèle Laroque as Suzanne
- Christophe Odent as Jacky Cohen
- Thierry Gimenez as Richard
- Christine Dejoux as Lisa
- Patrick Aurignac as Éric
- Charles Assas as Nick Costa
- Christophe Maratier as Pascal
- Karin Viard as The girl
