= Brigitte Chamarande =

French actress (1953–2022)

Brigitte Chamarande (1953 – 14 March 2022) was a French actress. She was known for her roles in Subway, L'Étudiante, and Betty. She was the daughter of French actress and singer Marie-Louise Lucie Chamarande, known as Amarande (1953–2022), the great granddaughter of football referee Thomas Balvay (1888–1945), and the brother of French actor Sylvain Green (b. 1954).
