= Too Much (Little) Love =

1998 film

- Directed by: Jacques Doillon
- Written by: Brune Compagnon; Jacques Doillon
- Produced by: Alain Sarde
- Starring: Lou Doillon
- Cinematography: Christophe Pollock
- Edited by: Catherine Quesemand
- Distributed by: BAC Films
- Release date: 25 March 1998
- Running time: 119 minutes
- Country: France
- Language: French

Too Much (Little) Love (French: Trop (peu) d'amour) is a 1998 French film directed by Jacques Doillon. It was entered into the 48th Berlin International Film Festival.

== Cast ==
- Lou Doillon as Camille
- Jérémie Lippmann as David
- Elise Perrier as Emma
- Alexia Stresi as Margot
- Lambert Wilson as Paul
