= Arrêtez-moi =

- Theatrical release poster
- Directed by: Jean-Paul Lilienfeld
- Screenplay by: Jean-Paul Lilienfeld; Jean Teulé
- Produced by: Jesus Gonzalez-Elvira; Jean-Michel Rey; Nicolas Steil
- Starring: Sophie Marceau; Miou-Miou; Marc Barbé
- Cinematography: Pascal Rabaud
- Edited by: Aurique Delannoy
- Music by: Matthieu Gonet
- Production companies: Iris Productions; Rézo Productions
- Distributed by: Rézo Films
- Release date: 6 February 2013 (France)
- Running time: 100 minutes
- Country: France
- Language: French
- Budget: $5 million
- Box office: $815,000

Arrêtez-moi (Stop Me) is a 2013 French thriller film directed by Jean-Paul Lilienfeld and starring Sophie Marceau, Miou-Miou, and Marc Barbé. Written by Jean-Paul Lilienfeld and Jean Teulé, the film is about a woman who shows up at a police station and confesses to the murder of her abusive husband several years earlier. The female police officer who interviews her cannot understand why this woman who was never a suspect has come forward after all this time. The more she learns about the woman's life, the less she wants to arrest her. Arrêtez-moi was released on 6 February 2013 in France.

== Cast ==
- Sophie Marceau as La coupable
- Miou-Miou as Pontoise
- Marc Barbé as Jimmy
- Yann Ebonge as Joliveau
- Valérie Bodson as Madeleine
- Julie Maes as Brigitte
- Arthur Buyssens as Cédric (17 ans)
  - Vadim Goudsmits as Cédric (7 ans)
- Thomas Coumans as Pontoise's friend
- Eric Godon as The guardian

== Production ==
Arrêtez-moi was filmed on location in Dunkirk, France.

== Reception ==
=== Accolades ===
The film received a Lumière Awards nomination for Best Screenplay (Jean-Paul Lilienfeld).
