= Jean-Roger Milo =

French actor (1957–2023)

- Born: June 5, 1957; France
- Died: October 12, 2023 (aged 66); France
- Occupation: Actor

Jean-Roger Milo (5 June 1957 – 12 October 2023) was a French actor.

== Biography ==
After learning his craft at the theatre with Sacha Pitoëff, Jean-Roger Milo was noticed by the cinema. He appeared in the 1982 movie Ace of Aces alongside Jean-Paul Belmondo. In 1993, he was nominated for a César Award for Best Supporting Actor for the role of Chaval in the film Germinal. He played a cop in L.627. In addition to blockbusters, he has also held roles in more modest productions such as Prison at home or the Sagards movie.

Milo's earliest works were minor appearances in The Key to the Door (1978), Rosy the Gale (1979), and Mario Monicelli and the Band of Rex (1980). In 1980 he played the role of a criminal in The Woman Cop.

Milo worked with renowned directors like Bertrand Tavernier in films like A Sunday in the Country (1984) and The Life And Nothing Other (1989). Claude Berri cast Milo in Germinal (1993).

Jean-Roger Milo died on 12 October 2023, at the age of 66.

== Selected filmography ==
- 1980: The Woman Cop
- 1982: Ace of Aces
- 1982: Toutes griffes dehors (TV Mini-Series)
- 1983: Le Marginal
- 1984: Dog Day
- 1984: A Sunday in the Country
- 1985: Among Wolves
- 1986: Sarrounia
- 1992: L.627
- 1993: Germinal
- 2004 : San-Antonio
