= Knight Moves (film) =

1992 film by Carl Schenkel

- German theatrical release poster
- Directed by: Carl Schenkel
- Written by: Brad Mirman
- Produced by: Jean-Luc Defait; Ziad El Khoury; Dieter Geissler; Guy Collins; Gordon Mark
- Starring: Christopher Lambert; Diane Lane; Tom Skerritt; Daniel Baldwin
- Cinematography: Dietrich Lohmann
- Edited by: Norbert Herzner
- Music by: Anne Dudley
- Production companies: Knight Moves Productions; Republic Pictures
- Distributed by: CineVox Film Gmbh (through Warner Bros.; Germany); Columbia TriStar Film Distributors International (France); InterStar Releasing (North America)
- Release dates: January 22, 1992 (Germany); January 22, 1993 (U.S.)
- Running time: 116 minutes
- Countries: Germany; France; United States
- Language: English
- Budget: $9 million
- Box office: $31.5 million

Knight Moves is a 1992 thriller film, directed by Carl Schenkel and written by Brad Mirman, about a chess grandmaster who is accused of several grisly murders.

== Plot ==
In 1972 David and Peter face each other in a chess match. David, the loser, stabs the winner Peter with a fountain pen. The loser's savage attack on his childhood opponent after his public humiliation and defeat lead to the dissolution of his parents' marriage. His father leaves forever, and the boy finds his mother dying from suicide from a slashed wrist, yet he ignores her and retrieves his locked-away chessboard. The boy spends the next twenty years in and out of asylums and foster care and is never seen again.

In the meantime, Peter becomes one of the youngest, most successful chess grandmasters in history. A brilliant yet troubled widower with a beloved daughter, he suddenly finds himself a suspect in his casual lover's murder. When more homicides occur, newly appointed Police Captain Frank Sedman and his partner Detective Andy Wagner determine that a serial killer is at work. As the chess master becomes more and more connected to the deaths, psychologist Kathy Sheppard is brought in to figure out if the chess prodigy is as innocent as he claims to be.

== Cast ==
- Christopher Lambert as Peter Sanderson
- Diane Lane as Kathy Sheppard
- Tom Skerritt as Captain Frank Sedman
- Daniel Baldwin as Detective Andy Wagner
- Katharine Isabelle as Erica Sanderson
- Charles Bailey-Gates as David Willerman
- Blu Mankuma as Steve Nolan
- Ferdy Mayne as Jeremy Edmonds
- Elizabeth Baldwin as Christie Eastman
- Rachel Hayward as Last Victim
- Megan Leitch as Mother
- Codie Lucas Wilbee as David at nine
- Don Thompson as Father
- Joshua Murray as Peter at fourteen
- Alex Diakun as Grandmaster Lutz
- Arthur Brauss as Viktor Yurilivich
- Elizabeth Barclay as Loraine Olson
- Aundrea MacDonald as Mary Albert
- Sam Malkin as Doctor Fulton
- Kymberly Sheppard as Detective Janet McLellan
- Deryl Hayes as Officer Harton
- Kehli O'Byrne as Debi Rutlege
- Monica Marko as Miss Greenwell

== Production ==
Filming took place on location in Victoria, British Columbia, Canada. The exterior of the hotel is actually Hatley Castle which is part of the Hatley Park National Historic Site. The interiors were filmed in a German studio as well as the Tea Lobby of the Fairmont Empress Hotel in Victoria.

Lambert and Lane were married in real life during the production, having been married from 1988 to 1994.

== Reception ==
=== Box office ===
The film was a modest financial success in the United States, grossing $560,580 and finishing at 15th in its opening week, it had a total gross of $853,554. In Germany, the film had almost two million viewers. It became Carl Schenkel's most commercially successful movie.

=== Critical response ===
On Rotten Tomatoes the film has an approval rating of 17% based on reviews from six critics.

== Cancelled sequel ==
After the financial success of the film, a script was commissioned for a sequel with Karl Stange and Sigrid Ann Davison brought in to pen the follow-up. They submitted their draft entitled Knight Moves II to the producer in January 1994, but the film was never made.
