= List of 1993 box office number-one films in France =

This is a list of films which have placed number one at the weekly box office in France during 1993. Amounts are in French franc.

== Number-one films ==
†	This implies the highest-grossing movie of the year.

#	Week ending	Film	Box office	Notes	Ref
1	5 January 1993	Home Alone 2: Lost in New York	€13,848,278		
2	12 January 1993	The Bodyguard	€8,886,411	The Bodyguard reached number one in its fifth week of release	
3	19 January 1993	Bram Stoker's Dracula	€31,254,800		
4	26 January 1993	Bram Stoker's Dracula	€23,033,747		
5	2 February 1993	Les Visiteurs †	€17,604,374		
6	9 February 1993	Les Visiteurs †	€22,722,430		
7	16 February 1993	Les Visiteurs †	€22,001,323		
8	23 February 1993	Les Visiteurs †	€23,519,584		
9	2 March 1993	Les Visiteurs †	€25,381,824		
10	9 March 1993	Les Visiteurs †	€22,418,363		
11	16 March 1993	Les Visiteurs †	€16,926,202		
12	23 March 1993	Les Visiteurs †	€13,203,490		
13	30 March 1993	Les Visiteurs †	€11,787,586		
14	6 April 1993	Les Visiteurs †	€10,884,384		
15	13 April 1993	The Jungle Book (reissue)	€14,055,941	The Jungle Book reissue reached number one in its third week of release	
16	20 April 1993	The Jungle Book (reissue)	€12,032,879		
17	27 April 1993	The Jungle Book (reissue)	€12,596,650		
18	4 May 1993	Les Visiteurs †	€9,869,677	Les Visiteurs returned to number one in its 14th week of release	
19	11 May 1993	Les Visiteurs †	€12,137,585		
20	18 May 1993	Indecent Proposal	€10,643,119		
21	25 May 1993	Les Visiteurs †	€10,855,166	Les Visiteurs returned to number one in its 17th week of release	
22	1 June 1993	The Piano	€10,891,638	The Piano reached number one in its second week of release	
23	8 June 1993	The Piano	€8,735,688		
24	15 June 1993	The Piano	€10,258,196		
25	22 June 1993	Fanfan	€6,341,843		
26	29 June 1993	Made in America	€16,376,396		
27	6 July 1993	Made in America	€6,723,743		
28	13 July 1993	RoboCop 3	€9,611,927		
29	20 July 1993	Les Visiteurs †	€6,427,299	Les Visiteurs returned to number one in its 25th week of release	
30	27 July 1993	Les Visiteurs †	€6,670,194		
31	3 August 1993	Les Visiteurs †	€6,206,322		
32	10 August 1993	Les Visiteurs †	€5,272,409		
33	17 August 1993	Last Action Hero	€21,416,522		
34	24 August 1993	Last Action Hero	€13,842,587		
35	31 August 1993	Hot Shots! Part Deux	€19,893,379		
36	7 September 1993	The Fugitive	€21,291,620		
37	14 September 1993	The Fugitive	€16,254,690		
38	21 September 1993	The Fugitive	€11,881,781		
39	28 September 1993	The Fugitive	€11,707,987		
40	5 October 1993	Germinal	€29,649,895		
41	12 October 1993	Germinal	€36,778,851		
42	19 October 1993	Germinal	€35,273,599		
43	26 October 1993	Jurassic Park	75,921,710	Jurassic Park set a record opening	
44	2 November 1993	Jurassic Park	€63,131,611		
45	9 November 1993	Jurassic Park	€23,489,086		
46	16 November 1993	Jurassic Park	€22,080,850		
47	23 November 1993	Jurassic Park	€10,433,023		
48	30 November 1993	Aladdin	€27,558,906	Aladdin reached number one in its third week of release	
49	7 December 1993	Aladdin	€29,196,386		
50	14 December 1993	Aladdin	€26,566,520		
51	21 December 1993	Aladdin	€28,016,073		
52	28 December 1993	Aladdin	€41,504,830		

== See also ==
- List of French films of 1993
- Lists of box office number-one films
