= Germinal (1993 film) =

- Film poster
- Directed by: Claude Berri
- Screenplay by: Claude Berri; Arlette Langmann
- Based on: Germinal by Émile Zola
- Produced by: Claude Berri; Pierre Grunstein; Bodo Scriba
- Starring: Renaud; Miou-Miou; Jean Carmet; Judith Henry; Jean-Roger Milo; Gérard Depardieu
- Cinematography: Yves Angelo
- Edited by: Hervé de Luze
- Music by: Jean-Louis Roques
- Distributed by: AMLF
- Release date: 29 September 1993 (France)
- Running time: 160 minutes
- Country: France
- Language: French
- Budget: €27.4 million
- Box office: $36.1 million

Germinal is a 1993 French-Belgian epic film based on the 1885 novel by Émile Zola. It was directed by Claude Berri, and stars Renaud, Miou-Miou and Gérard Depardieu. At the time it was the most expensive movie ever produced in France. It was the fourth most attended film of the year in France.

It won the César Award for Best Cinematography and Best Costume Design, and was nominated for Best Film, Best Actress, Best Supporting Actor, Best Supporting Actress, Best Director, Best Original Screenplay or Adaptation, Best Sound, Best Editing, Best Music and Best Production Design. The film was selected as the French entry for the Best Foreign Language Film at the 66th Academy Awards, but was not accepted as a nominee.

The film, set in the nineteenth century, closely follows the plot of the novel, which is a realistic story of a coalminers' strike in northern France in the 1860s.

== Synopsis ==
The film takes place in Northern France in a coal mining town during the mid-nineteenth century. The film begins with Étienne Lantier, an unemployed engineer, arrives at a coal mine named "Le Voreux" seeking work. He is ignored by each over-worked, tired miner until Maheu learns that one of his team members has died and must find a replacement. Maheu is the father of eight children some of whom work in the mines. Catherine is on her father's mining team and becomes interested in Étienne Lantier when he begins working with them. Later, he moves in with them because the Maheu family needs the rent money he provides after their eldest son, Zacharie, marries the girl he impregnated.

The main action of the film occurs after a cave-in in the mines due to insufficient timbering. The director of Voreux, Philippe Hennebeau, lowered the price of each coal cart to encourage the miners to spend more time timbering after the costly accident. Étienne who arrived at "Le Voreux" after punching his former boss and getting fired, had already been encouraging workers to go on strike. His lively conversations with Rassneur (who possesses socialist views) and Souvarine (who possesses anarchist views) about going on strike and earning better working conditions for the miners occur throughout the film. The workers go on strike led by Maheu and Étienne; however, Catherine, influenced by her possessive lover, Chaval, goes to work at Jean Bart, another mine in the area. Maheude, Catherine's mother and Maheu's wife, kicks her out of the house, and she is forced to live with the emotionally abusive Chaval, while Etienne pines for her.

As the strike progresses, soldiers are sent to Voreux to protect the mine and keep the town in check. Maheu and Etienne host a rally one night and Chaval appears, claiming allegiance to the cause. The next day, he arrives at Jean Bart to stop work. However, he is unsuccessful; even Catherine is against him, and the miners return to work after a minor interruption until Maheu and Étienne arrive at Jean Barts.

At the height of the strike, the workers of Voreux march on the factory, which is protected by soldiers, and demand they stand down. The workers who brought women and children, including Maheude and her infant, were emboldened to destroy the mine. After a brief standoff, Maheu is shot and killed and the strike comes to a halt.

The following day, the workers return to Voreux, but Souvarine, the anarchist, sabotages the mine so that it would flood. The workers return as Souvarine leaves, and Étienne, Chaval, and Catherine are trapped in the mine when it fills with water and the mine shaft collapses. Chaval tries to attack Catherine after accusing her of cheating on him with Étienne, so Étienne defends her by killing Chaval. The two lovers are finally together for a brief moment before Catherine dies in the mine. Zacharie and several other miners enter the mine at another point to save Catherine and Étienne but is killed by an explosion from his lantern. Étienne makes it out of the mine alive and leaves Voreux for good in the final scene after saying goodbye to Maheude, who is seen descending into the mine with the other workers.

While the strike occurs, the audience receives glimpses into the lives of the Director (Hennebeau) of mines and his family. Hennebeau's nephew, Paul Négrel, is the engineer at Voreux. He is engaged to Cécile Gregoire, the daughter of, Voreux's owner Léon Gregoire. However, Paul is having an affair with this aunt, Madame Hennebeau.

== Historical Context ==
Émile Zola wrote Germinal as the thirteenth novel of part of a twenty-part series titled Les Rougon-Macquart, which focuses on themes of Naturalism which Zola heavily endorsed throughout his life. The novel deals with themes of family, Marxism, labor relations, class relations, and poverty. Zola wrote the novel after spending about a week with miners on strike in northeastern France. He took a thousand pages of notes and released the novel in 1884. Zola named the novel after the spring month of the French Republican Calendar as a metaphor for the growth or rebirth of people as they realize they no longer have to face exploitation. In fact, at the time of its publishing, the French population was mostly unaware of the poor working conditions of miners and horrified by this revelation as well as shocked by the idea that they might unite. The themes in Germinal were very fitting for the time, during which labor relations were strained and the proletariat workforce was heavily exploited as a result of the Industrial Revolution in France. In 1892 alone French workers went on strike 261 times and working conditions did not improve for most.

== Cast ==
- Renaud : Étienne Lantier
- Miou-Miou : La Maheude
- Gérard Depardieu : Toussaint Maheu
- Jean Carmet : Vincent Maheu dit Bonnemort
- Judith Henry : Catherine Maheu
- Jean-Roger Milo : Antoine Chaval (Called Chaval in the novel, the name Antoine is from the files of Emile Zola)
- Laurent Terzieff : Souvarine
- Bernard Fresson : Victor Deneulin
- Jean-Pierre Bisson : Rasseneur
- Gérard Croce : Maigrat
- Jacques Dacqmine : Philippe Hennebeau
- Anny Duperey : Madame Hennebeau
- Frédéric van den Driessche : Paul Négrel
- Annick Alane : Madame Grégoire
- Pierre Lafont : Léon Grégoire
- Yolande Moreau : La Levaque
- Thierry Levaret : Zacharie Maheu
- Albano Guaetta : Jeanlin Maheu
- Séverine Huon : Alzire Maheu
- Jessica Sueur : Léonore Maheu
- Mathieu Mathez : Henri Maheu
- Alexandre Lekieffre : Maxime Maheu (Estelle Maheu in the novel)
- Georges Staquet : Levaque
- Sabrina Deladerière : Philomène Levaque
- Maximilien Reggiani : Pierron
- Joël Petit : Bébert
- Anne-Marie Pisani : La Mouquette
- André Julien : Mouque
- Yvette Petit : La veuve Désir
- Solenn Jarniou : Madame Rasseneur
- Fred Personne : Pluchart
- Cécile Bois : Cécile Grégoire
- Delphine Quentin : Lucie Deneulin
- Alexandrine Loeb : Jeanne Deneulin
- Fred Ulysse : Dansaert
- Frédérique Ruchaud : Honorine
- Maryse Moutier : Mélanie
- Jenny Clève : Rose
- Nathalie Hequet : Amélie
- Bruno Tuchszer : Captain of the Guards
- Fernand Kindt : Company Secretary
- André Chaumeau : Company Cashier
- Philippe Desboeuf : The Doctor

== Reception ==
=== Critical reception ===
The movie was well-received by the critics. Review aggregator Rotten Tomatoes reports that 75% of 12 critics gave the film a positive review, for an average rating of 6.9/10.

=== Box office ===
The film opened at number one at the French box office with a gross of 29.6 million French francs ($5.2 million) from 314 theatres in its opening week. It expanded to 456 theatres in its second week and remained at number one with a gross of 36.8 million francs ($6.5 million) and stayed there for a third week. The film had 6,161,776 admissions in France making it the fourth most attended film of the year. The film grossed $36.1 million worldwide.

== See also ==
- List of submissions to the 66th Academy Awards for Best Foreign Language Film
- List of French submissions for the Academy Award for Best Foreign Language Film
- Germinal (1963)
