= Cartagena (film) =

- Theatrical release poster
- Directed by: Alain Monne
- Screenplay by: Alain Monne; Nathalie Vailloud
- Based on: L'Homme de chevet by Eric Holder
- Produced by: Pierre Forette; Christine Gozlan; Thierry Wong
- Starring: Sophie Marceau; Christopher Lambert; Margarita Rosa de Francisco
- Cinematography: Antoine Roch
- Edited by: Catherine Schwartz
- Music by: Florencia Di Concilio
- Production companies: Ciné Nominé; Thelma Films; Arte France Cinéma
- Distributed by: Rézo Films
- Release date: 18 November 2009 (France)
- Running time: 92 minutes
- Country: France
- Language: French

Cartagena (French: L'homme de chevet) is a 2009 French drama film directed by Alain Monne and starring Sophie Marceau, Christopher Lambert, and Margarita Rosa de Francisco. Based on the novel L'Homme de chevet by Eric Holder, with a screenplay by Alain Monne and Nathalie Vailloud, the film is about a beautiful, free-spirited woman who becomes bedridden following a terrible accident. Against her better judgement, she hires a drunk middle-aged former boxer to cook and care for her. Although unqualified for the position, he is desperate to work, and slowly he wins the trust of the woman, who teaches him how to read by introducing him to the works of Charles Bukowski. Through his help, she is forced to consider the potential happiness that awaits her in the outside world.

Cartagena was filmed on location in Cartagena, Bolívar, Colombia. The actor Christopher Lambert spent six months in Cartagena training with coach Anibal Gonzalez during his preparation for the role.

== Cast ==
- Sophie Marceau as Muriel
- Christopher Lambert as Léo
- Margarita Rosa de Francisco as Lucia
- Rodolfo De Souza as Valdes
- Linett Hernandez Valdes as Lina
- Salvatore Basile as Le kinésithérapeute
- Elizabeth del Carmen Bonilla Isaza as Infirmière remplaçante
- Yamile Cardenas Moreno as Fille blonde coup de poing
- Hancel Gonzalez Forero as L'enfant rêve
- Anibal Gonzalez Parra as Ami Léo
- Diogenes Guerra Miranda as Ecrivain public
- Julian Iragorri as Homme bagarre
- Juliana Morales Uribe as Fille blonde
- Nelson Pallares Narvaez as L'enfant crocodiles
- Alberto Thiele Cenzato as Homme bagarre
- Angelica Vargas as Fille blonde
- Eparkio Vega as Vendeur de livres
