= The 15 Year Old Girl =

1989 film

- Directed by: Jacques Doillon
- Written by: Jacques Doillon
- Produced by: Yannick Bernard
- Starring: Judith Godrèche
- Cinematography: Caroline Champetier
- Edited by: Catherine Quesemand
- Distributed by: Pari Films
- Release date: 13 September 1989
- Running time: 86 minutes
- Country: France
- Language: French

The 15 Year Old Girl (French: La Fille de 15 ans) is a 1989 French drama film directed by Jacques Doillon. The plot is about a teenage girl falling in love with the father of her boyfriend. It was entered into the 16th Moscow International Film Festival.

== Cast ==
- Judith Godrèche as Juliette
- Melvil Poupaud as Thomas
- Jacques Doillon as Willy

== Sexual misconduct allegations ==
In 2024, Judith Godrèche pressed charges against Jacques Doillon for sexually assaulting her while working on this film, first when they met at his home during pre-production, then on the set while filming an intimate scene between their two characters.
