= Firelight =

- Theatrical release poster
- Directed by: William Nicholson
- Written by: William Nicholson
- Produced by: Brian Eastman
- Starring: Sophie Marceau; Stephen Dillane; Kevin Anderson; Lia Williams; Dominique Belcourt; Joss Ackland
- Cinematography: Nic Morris
- Edited by: Chris Wimble
- Music by: Christopher Gunning
- Production companies: Hollywood Pictures; Wind Dancer Productions; Carnival Films
- Distributed by: Buena Vista Pictures Distribution (Note: Co-distributed with Miramax Films in the United States and Canada.) (United States, Canada, United Kingdom, Ireland, Germany, Austria, Italy and Spain); Eurozoom (France)
- Release dates: 14 September 1997 (Deauville); 4 September 1998 (USA)
- Running time: 107 minutes
- Countries: Canada; France; United States
- Languages: English; French
- Box office: $795,973 (worldwide $3,136,765)

Firelight is a 1997 period romance film written and directed by William Nicholson and starring Sophie Marceau and Stephen Dillane. The film is about a woman who agrees to bear the child of an anonymous English landowner in return for payment to resolve her father's debts. When the child is born, the woman gives up the child as agreed. Seven years later, the woman is hired as a governess to a girl on a remote Sussex estate. The girl's father is the anonymous landowner. Filmed on location in Firle, England and Calvados, France, the film premiered at the Deauville American Film Festival on 14 September 1997. Firelight was Nicholson's first film as a director.

== Plot ==
In 1837, French-speaking Swiss governess Elisabeth Laurier agrees to bear a child for an anonymous English landowner in return for money (£500) needed to pay her father's debts. They meet over three nights at a coastal hotel and have sex. Despite their wish for detachment, they develop a deeply passionate connection during their lovemaking by firelight. Their feelings grow after they converse on the beach and at the hotel. Nine months later (10 August 1838), Elisabeth gives birth to a girl, and as agreed, gives up her daughter to the care of the father. Over the coming years, Elisabeth never forgets her child. She begins to keep a journal of watercoloured flowers and plants, adding a page for each of the holidays and her daughter's birthdays which occur while they are apart.

The anonymous Englishman is Charles Godwin, a landowner and struggling sheep farmer, who can barely keep the creditors of his philandering father, Lord Clare, at bay. Charles's wife, Amy Godwin, is paralysed and catatonic due to a horseriding accident. Amy's sister, Constance, runs the Godwin household.

Seven years after giving up her daughter, Elisabeth gains employment as the new governess for the child, who is named Louisa. She has done so knowing that Louisa is her daughter. Initially, Charles rejects Elisabeth, and demands that she leave immediately. However, Constance insists that he should give the new governess a month to find a new situation. Showing Elisabeth his wife, Charles makes Elisabeth swear never to reveal to Louisa or anyone else the nature of their previous relationship.

Louisa is a spoiled, ignorant and wilful child, unloved by anyone except her father. Though she acknowledges the father's loving relationship with his daughter, Elisabeth is appalled by the lack of control Charles has over the girl. He refuses to use any form of discipline in her upbringing. Unable to keep Louisa at her lessons, Elisabeth locks the child in the classroom. When he discovers this, Charles is furious and roughly manhandles Elisabeth in an effort to extract the key to the schoolroom. While Charles wants his daughter to enjoy life as much as she can, Elisabeth is determined to teach her daughter how to behave in order to be loved by others, and to be educated so she can determine her own path in the world. To convince Charles to support her approach, Elisabeth promises she will never harm the girl, and whatever she does to Louisa she will also do to herself. While this is happening, Elisabeth receives but rejects a marriage proposal from an American rancher who is staying with Godwin.

Outside of class, Louisa spends all of her spare time in the lakehouse, a small belvedere on the estate in the middle of a lake, which can only be reached by boat. Here, Louisa pretends she has a mother. At first, Elisabeth watches clandestinely from the jetty while Louisa is in the lakehouse. However, when she finds out that Charles swims naked there in the morning, she begins to go to watch Charles too, leaving before he can see her. In the classroom, Elisabeth paints picture cards to teach the seven-year-old how to read. She also tells Louisa a tale about the firelight:

It's a kind of magic. Firelight makes time stand still. When you put out the lamps and sit in the firelight's glow there aren't any rules any more. You can do what you want, say what you want, be what you want, and when the lamps are lit again, time starts again, and everything you said or did is forgotten. More than forgotten it never happened.

Elisabeth finds that this helps Louisa concentrate on her lessons, knowing there is a time at the end of the day when there are no rules.

Increasingly attracted to Elisabeth, Charles asks her to promise him that they can never be close like they once were. But Elisabeth does not answer. They begin a sexual relationship. Charles even talks about the three of them leaving together, but Elisabeth says she knows it is impossible, as he has obligations to his estate, family, and wife. Charles suddenly announces that the entire estate is being appraised for sale, purportedly to cover his overwhelming debts. On a bitterly cold night, Charles consults his conscience as to whether his wife, Amy, would want him to release her from her catatonic prison of ten years. He opens the windows of her bedroom, removes her covers, and allows the fire in her room to go out, leaving her to die of exposure. With Amy's death, her sister Constance admits that she has grown close to Charles, although they cannot marry. However, she concedes defeat when, at Amy's funeral, she realises Charles's depth of feeling toward Elisabeth. Elisabeth confronts Charles and asks him if he killed Amy, which he admits. They both feel strong guilt, but no regret.

Soon after, Louisa looks through Elisabeth's room and discovers the illustrated journal dedicated to "My English Daughter". Louisa confronts Elisabeth, who confirms that she is her mother. After the sale of the Godwin estate, Charles, Elisabeth, and Louisa leave on a snowy day to begin their new lives together as a family.

== Cast ==
- Sophie Marceau as Elisabeth Laurier
- Stephen Dillane as Charles Godwin
- Kevin Anderson as John Taylor
- Lia Williams as Constance
- Dominique Belcourt as Louisa Godwin
- Joss Ackland as Lord Clare
- Sally Dexter as Molly Holland
- Emma Amos as Ellen
- Maggie McCarthy as Mrs Jago
- Wolf Kahler as Sussman
- Annabel Giles as Amy Godwin
- John Flanagan as Robert Ames
- Valerie Minifie as Hannah
- Diana Payan as Mrs. Maidment
- John Hodgkinson as Carlo

== Production ==
=== Filming locations ===
- Calvados, France
- Firle Place, West Firle, East Sussex, England
- Pinewood Studios, Iver Heath, Buckinghamshire, England (studio interiors)

== Reception ==
The review aggregator website Rotten Tomatoes gives Firelight an approval rating of 41%, based on 17 reviews. The website's consensus reads, "Predictable and dull."

=== Awards and nominations ===
- 1997 British Society of Cinematographers Award for Best Cinematography (Nic Morris) Won
- 1997 San Sebastián International Film Festival Prize of the Jury for Best Cinematography (Nic Morris) Won
- 1997 San Sebastián International Film Festival Golden Seashell Award (Nic Morris) Won
