= Absolon (film) =

2003 film directed by David Barto

- Promotional film poster
- Directed by: David Barto
- Written by: Brad Mirman
- Produced by: Jamie Brown
- Starring: Christopher Lambert; Lou Diamond Phillips; Kelly Brook; Ron Perlman; Roberta Angelica
- Cinematography: Unax Mendía; Curtis Petersen
- Edited by: Evan Landis
- Music by: Gary Koftinoff
- Production companies: GFT Absolon Films, Inc.; Studio Eight Absolon Films, Ltd.
- Distributed by: Lions Gate
- Release date: 16 December 2003
- Running time: 96 minutes
- Countries: Canada; United Kingdom
- Language: English
- Budget: $8 million
- Box office: $7,016

Absolon is a 2003 post-apocalyptic science fiction thriller film directed by David Barto and starring Christopher Lambert, Lou Diamond Phillips, and Kelly Brook. The plot concerns a future society where the only hope for survival from a deadly virus is a drug called Absolon.

== Plot ==
In 2010, a deadly virus infected everyone on the planet, wiping out 50% of the population. Absolon is a drug regimen that everyone must now take to stay alive. One corporation controls the drug and Murchison (Ron Perlman) is its leader.

A corporate scientist, who was researching the virus, is found murdered. Norman Scott (Christopher Lambert) is the policeman assigned to investigate the crime. He eventually uncovers a conspiracy involving the scientist. He is given a partial dosage of the cure the scientist had been working on, but soon realizes that he is being hunted by an assassination team. Scott goes on the run with Claire (Kelly Brook), one of the murdered scientist's colleagues. They find out that the assassins are employed by Murchison.

Scott discovers that he is being chased down for the cure in his bloodstream. Eventually, he finds out that the cure he was carrying was not for the original virus, which had died out years ago, but for the worldwide dependence on the addictive Absolon drug itself, which had changed everyone's body chemistry to the point that they could not live without it.

== Cast ==
- Christopher Lambert as Det. Norman Scott
- Lou Diamond Phillips as Agent Walters
- Kelly Brook as Dr. Claire Whittaker
- Ron Perlman as Murchison
- Roberta Angelica as Det. Ruth Bryant
- Trevor Smith as Vasquez
- James Kidnie as Doc
- Neville Edwards as Harris
