= Speak to Me of Love =

- Theatrical release poster
- Directed by: Sophie Marceau
- Written by: Sophie Marceau
- Produced by: Alain Sarde
- Starring: Judith Godrèche; Niels Arestrup; Anne Le Ny
- Cinematography: Emmanuel Machuel
- Edited by: Claudine Merlin
- Music by: Éric Neveux
- Distributed by: Mars Distribution
- Release date: 29 August 2002
- Running time: 98 minutes
- Country: France
- Language: French
- Budget: $3.4 million
- Box office: $240.000

Speak to Me of Love (French: Parlez-moi d'amour) is a 2002 French drama film written and directed by Sophie Marceau and starring Judith Godrèche, Niels Arestrup, and Anne Le Ny. The first feature-length motion picture directed by actress Sophie Marceau, the film is about the breakup of a long-term relationship. Speak to Me of Love was filmed on location in New York City and Paris. In 2002, the film received the Montréal World Film Festival Award for Best Director (Sophie Marceau) and was nominated for the Grand Prix des Amériques.

== Plot ==
Justine and Richard's fifteen-year relationship ends in separation due to irreconcilable differences with Justine maintaining custody of their three boys. Her new life means having to deal with being a single parent but at the same time, she comes to terms with her own parents' divorce and finds a common bond with her long-suffering mother. Richard, a renowned author, deals with the situation by devoting all his attention to his writing. Both are forced to confront their uncertain futures, while examining what led to the breakdown of their marriage.

== Cast ==
- Judith Godrèche as Justine
- Niels Arestrup as Richard
- Anne Le Ny as Amélie
- Laurence Février as Justine's mother
- Jean-Marie Frin as Justine's father
- Aurélien Wiik as William
- Daniel Isoppo as Hubert
- Christelle Tual as Josée
- Chantal Banlier as Christine
- Isabelle Olive as Carole
- Jimmy Baudrand as Constantin
- Louis-Alexandre Lucotte as Jérémy
- Jules Boudier as Jacob
- Ariane Seguillon as Corinne
- Léa Unglick as Justine (5 years old)
- Lilly-Fleur Pointeaux as Justine (9–12 years old)
- Nastasia Demont as Clémentine (8 years old)
- James Gorter as Clément (8 years old)
- Annelise Hesme as Elsa
- Julien Marion as Justine's brother (14 years old)

== Awards and nominations ==
- 2002 Montreal World Film Festival Award for Best Director (Sophie Marceau)
- 2002 Montreal World Film Festival Award Nomination for Grand Prix des Amériques (Sophie Marceau)
