= Trivial (film) =

- Theatrical release poster
- Directed by: Sophie Marceau
- Written by: Sophie Marceau; Gianguido Spinelli; Jacques Deschamps
- Produced by: Ariane Guez; Oury Milshtein
- Starring: Christopher Lambert; Sophie Marceau; Nicolas Briançon
- Cinematography: Laurent Dailland
- Edited by: Laurent Roüan
- Music by: Franck Louise
- Distributed by: SND (France)
- Release date: 23 May 2007 (France)
- Running time: 103 minutes
- Country: France
- Language: French
- Budget: $5.2 million
- Box office: $1.5 million

Trivial (French: La disparue de Deauville) is a 2007 French crime drama film directed by Sophie Marceau and starring Christopher Lambert, Sophie Marceau, and Nicolas Briançon. Written by Marceau, Gianguido Spinelli, and Jacques Deschamps, the film is about a police inspector, struggling with depression following his wife's death, who investigates a suspicious missing person's case at the request of a mysterious woman. Filmed on location in Normandy, France, Trivial is the second feature-length motion picture directed by actress Sophie Marceau.

== Plot ==
Lt. Jacques Renard (Christopher Lambert) is struggling with depression following the untimely death of his beloved wife, Chloé. After six months in a mental hospital following a suicide attempt, the disheveled and lonely Le Havre police lieutenant is still haunted by visions of his wife. One day, Renard finds a mysterious woman (Sophie Marceau) waiting for him in his car. She implores him to visit the manager of the Hotel Normandy, Antoine Bérangère (Robert Hossein), in nearby Deauville in Room 401. She insists that only Renard can help her, and then leaves.

Renard drives to Deauville to the luxury hotel where he meets Bérangère's thirty-nine-year-old son, Camille (Nicolas Briancon), and learns that Bérangère, who worked as manager of the Hotel Normandy for nearly four decades, vanished forty-eight hours earlier under suspicious circumstances. Without identification or money, he took his Mercedes, which he hadn't driven in years, and simply vanished, leaving everything behind except his hunting rifle. When Renard asks about Room 401, Camille insists there is no such room at the hotel.

While searching Bérangère's room, Renard discovers a key to Room 401. After a quick search, he finds the room which is decorated with old framed photographs, portraits, and mementos of Bérangère's deceased first wife—a film actress who looks like the mysterious woman he met in his car. Old newspaper clippings reveal that the actress, Victoria Benutti (Sophie Marceau), died in a car accident in 1970, exactly 36 years ago to the day of Bérangère's disappearance. Camille is annoyed by Renard's presence and inquiry, and Renard's partner Pierre (Simon Abkarian) is convinced that this is a simple suicide case. Renard, however, believes that something far more sinister is happening, and the suspicious actions of Antoine's second wife, Mélanie (Marie-Christine Barrault), convinces Renard that foul play has occurred.

At the hotel, Renard meets a Duchess (Judith Magre) who tells him how the "ghost of Victoria" still haunts the hotel after all these years. Soon after, he sees the mysterious woman and chases her through the hotel and onto the roof, but she eludes him. Shortly after the police discover Bérangère's car abandoned on the cliffs at Deauville, a body presumed to be that of Antoine Bérangère turns up in the city morgue, the skull and face obliterated by a gunshot blast from Bérangère's rifle. While investigating the crime scene at the foot of the cliffs, Renard spots the mysterious woman watching from a distance, and chases after her following her Volvo. After losing her trail, he stops at a gas station inquiring about her car, and by chance learns that shortly after Victoria's car accident in 1970, a man in a Mercedes stopped at the station and called for an ambulance. Renard suspects it was Bérangère.

Renard drives to the cemetery where Victoria (and his wife) are buried and finds the mysterious woman's Volvo with a DVD inside labeled "Lucie 1982". Later he watches the DVD of home movies of a teenager—scenes of her undressing and being molested—taken by Bérangère. In search of Lucie's identity, Renard goes back to the mental hospital where he is still being treated and the head nurse confirms that Lucie was indeed treated at the hospital while he was there following her own attempted suicide. Initially Renard has no memory of her, but later he remembers her and understands that the mysterious woman he's been pursuing is Lucie, the daughter of Victoria. Looking for Lucie's address, Renard steals the hospital computer containing patient records and goes out searching for her, with his partner Pierre in hot pursuit. Renard is eventually captured and taken to jail. Pierre and his colleagues believe he is mentally unstable.

Camille visits Renard in jail and tells him about his nanny, Evelyne (Brigitte Damiens), who disappeared after the crash. Camille remembers being in the car with his mother Victoria and her new lover, Albert, when Bérangère ran them off the road in 1970. Later at the hotel, Camille confronts his stepmother, Mélanie, who reveals that Victoria and her new lover were taking Camille away from Bérangère. Camille then remembers that at the crash site, Bérangère left Camille in the car while taking the baby Lucie with him. Bérangère later entrusted the baby's care and upbringing to Camille's former nanny, Evelyne. Camille eventually finds Evelyne's apartment where he discovers a DVD of home movies showing her being molested by Bérangère.

Meanwhile, Lucie visits Bérangère who was wounded by the tramp he killed—the same tramp his family was planning to cremate. Obsessed with the memory of Victoria, and after years of molesting Lucie, Bérangère staged his own death so that he and Lucie could run away together. Traumatized by years of abuse, Lucie tried but was unable to kill Bérangère.

After Pierre bails him out of jail, Renard goes back to the morgue convinced that the body belongs to some tramp, not Bérangère whom he now knows has been molesting Lucie and controlling her for years. Renard learns from Mélanie that Bérangère might be hiding on the family yacht, Victoria. At the yacht, Renard discovers Bérangère preparing to escape with a bag full of money. As Renard is about to arrest him, Lucie steps forward with a gun and ties up the surprised lieutenant. Once out to sea, Bérangère prepares to kill Renard, but Lucie lets go of the mast which knocks Bérangère into the ocean where he perishes. She unties Renard and they return to Deauville. Sometime later, Lucie meets Renard on the cliffs at Deauville, and they embrace and kiss.

== Cast ==
- Christopher Lambert as Jacques Renard
- Sophie Marceau as Victoria / Lucie
- Nicolas Briançon as Camille Bérangère
- Simon Abkarian as Pierre
- Robert Hossein as Antoine Bérangère
- Marie-Christine Barrault as Mélanie Bérangère
- Judith Magre as La duchesse
- Marilou Berry as Fred
- Magali Woch as Constance
- Jacques Boudet as Le commissaire Penaud
- Laure Duthilleul as Marilou
- Firmine Richard as The nurse
- Samir Guesmi as The medical student
- Valérie Tréjean as Chloé Renard
- Georges Benoît as Georges
- Denis Menochet as Jean-Luc
- Jean-Paul Bonnaire as Mario
- Guillaume Gouix as Young cashier
- Ahcène Nini as Momo
- Brigitte Damiens as Evelyne
- Sébastien Seveau as Albert Brieuc
