= Jacques Doillon =

French film director (born 1944)

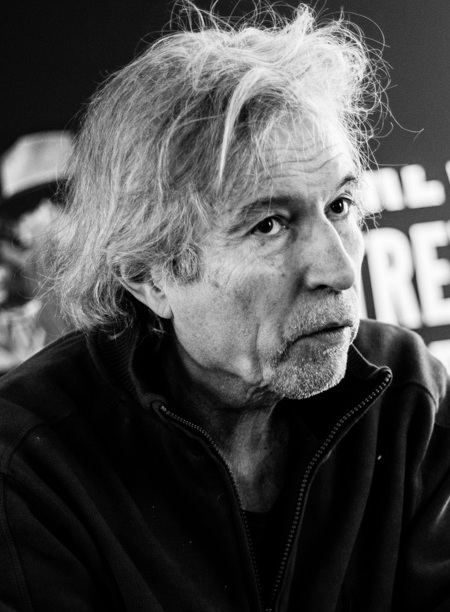
- Doillon in 2013
- Born: 15 March 1944 (age 82); Paris, France
- Occupations: Film director; screenwriter
- Years active: 1969–present
- Partner(s): Jane Birkin (c. 1980; sep. 1991); Joe Rohanne (c. 2009; sep. 2012)
- Children: 5, including Lola and Lou

Jacques Doillon (French: [ʒak dwajɔ̃]; born 15 March 1944) is a French film director and screenwriter.

== Early life and education ==
Doillon was born in Paris and attended the Lycée Voltaire.

== Career ==
His 1989 film The 15 Year Old Girl was entered into the 16th Moscow International Film Festival. His La vengeance d'une femme (1990) was entered into the 40th Berlin International Film Festival. The following year, his film Le Petit Criminel won an Honourable Mention at the 41st Berlin International Film Festival.

In 1993, his Le Jeune Werther won the Blue Angel Award at the 43rd Berlin International Film Festival. In 1998, his Trop (peu) d'amour was entered into the 48th Berlin International Film Festival.

== Personal life ==
He has two daughters: Lola Doillon (born 1975), whose mother is film editor Noëlle Boisson, and Lou Doillon (born 1982), from his relationship with English actress Jane Birkin in the 1980s. He has three other children named Lili, Lina, and Lazare.

=== Sexual abuse allegations ===
In February 2024, Judith Godrèche filed a criminal complaint which accused Doillon of rape during the filming of The 15 Year Old Girl when she was 15. As a result of the accusation, the Tours film festival cancelled its invitation to Doillon to chair its 2024 jury. Shortly thereafter, actresses Isild Le Besco and Anna Mouglalis joined Godrèche in accusing Doillon of sexual abuse. Le Besco has claimed Doillon made advances during work sessions and tried to sexually blackmail her in 2000 while she was auditioning for his film Carrément à l'Ouest. Mouglalis alleged that he forcefully kissed her in the summer of 2011 when her then-partner Samuel Benchetrit was appearing in Doillon's film Un enfant de toi. His upcoming film CE2 was postponed as the lead actors refused to promote the film.

On July 1, 2024, Doillon, along with director Benoit Jacquot, were both questioned by police over Godrèche's rape allegation. The two directors were also taken into custody by the Juvenile Protection Brigade. On July 2, Doillon was released without charge after spending forty eight hour (two days) in a Paris police station jail cell. It was stated that Doillon had been released from prison for medical reasons.

Shortly after his release, it was revealed that since February 2024, three additional criminal complaints had been filed against Doillon. The three women who filed these complaints were identified as Joe Rohanne, Hélène M. and Aurélie Le Roc'h. Rohanne, who filed her criminal complaint in February 2024, alleged three acts of rape, assault and battery, and psychological violence which she alleged were committed against her by Dollion during their romantic relationship. Rohanne's relationship with Doillon lasted between 2009 and 2012 and resulted in them conceiving a daughter who Rohanne claimed she got pregnant with during an occasion where Doillon raped her when she was taking sleeping pills. Hélène M., who alleged she first met Doillon when she was 15 years old, said Dollion "sodomized" her for the first time when she was 16 years old. In her complaint, Le Roc'h, a French actress, alleged that Doillon committed "attempted rape" when she working on his film Petits Frères in 1998. According to La'Roch, Doillon tried to force her into having a sexual relationship with him. These three complaints had served as the basis for his forty-eight hour stay in police custody.

Despite no charges being brought at the time of his release, and Rohanne's case being outside the statute of limitation, the criminal investigation against Doillon would continue, with the Paris prosecutor's office reserving the right to "assess the scope and terms of the follow-up" to the criminal complaints made against him.

== Filmography ==
=== Feature films ===
Year	English title	Original title	Notes
1973	The Year 01	L'An 01	Co-directed by Alain Resnais and Jean Rouch; Written by Gébé
1974	Touched in the Head	Les Doigts dans la tête	
1975	A Bag of Marbles	Un sac de billes	
1979	The Hussy	La Drôlesse	
1979	The Crying Woman	La Femme qui pleure	
1981	The Prodigal Daughter	La Fille prodigue	
1984	The Pirate	La Pirate	
1985	The Temptation of Isabelle	La Tentation d'Isabelle	
1985	Family Life	La Vie de famille	
1986	The Prude	La Puritaine	
1987	Comedy!	Comédie !	
1988	—N/a	L'Amoureuse	
1989	The 15 Year Old Girl	La Fille de 15 ans	
1990	The Little Gangster	Le Petit Criminel	
1990	A Woman's Revenge	La Vengeance d'une femme	
1992	Lover	Amoureuse	
1993	Young Werther	Le Jeune Werther	
1994	—N/a	Du fond du cœur	
1996	Ponette		
1998	Too Much (Little) Love	Trop (peu) d'amour	
1999	Little Brothers	Petits Frères	
2001	—N/a	Carrément à l'Ouest	
2003	Raja		
2008	Just Anybody	Le Premier venu	
2010	The Three-Way Wedding	Le Mariage à trois	
2012	A Child of Yours	Un enfant de toi	
2013	Love Battles	Mes séances de lutte	
2017	Rodin		
2021	Third Grade	CE2	

=== Short films ===
Year	Title	Notes
1969	Trial	Documentary
1970	La Voiture électronique	Documentary
1970	Vitesse oblige	Documentary
1971	Tous risques	Documentary
1971	On ne se dit pas tout entre époux	
1971	Bol d'or	Documentary
1973	Laissés pour compte	Documentary
1973	Les Demi-jours	Documentary
1973	Autour des filets	Documentary
1991	Contre l'oubli	Segment: Pour Anstraum Aman Villagran Morales, Guatémala

=== Television ===
Year	Title	Notes
1982	L'Arbre	TV movie
1983	Monsieur Abel	TV movie
1985	Mangui, onze ans peut-être	TV documentary
1990	Pour un oui ou pour un non	TV movie
1993	Un homme à la mer	TV movie
1995	Un siècle d'écrivains : Nathalie Sarraute	TV documentary

=== Acting ===
Year	Title	Role	Notes
1979	The Crying Woman	Jacques	
1985	She Spent So Many Hours Under the Sun Lamps	—N/a	
1989	The 15 Year Old Girl	Willy	
2005	A Perfect Couple	Jacques	
2012	Headfirst	Writer	
