= Ariel Besse =

French actress (1965–2022)

- Born: 7 October 1965
- Died: 29 May 2022 (aged 56); Flayosc, Var, France
- Occupation: Actress
- Years active: 1981–1982
- Children: 3

Ariel Besse or Ariel Besse-Atanoux (7 October 1965 – 29 May 2022) was a French actress.

Her first film role was a starring part in Bertrand Blier's 1981 film Beau Pere, when she was 15. Besse's parents sued the distributors for the poster, which shows her breasts, as it was exhibited on billboards around France without their permission, losing the case.

She is also noted for playing Aline in the film Mora (1982). After three films, she quit acting and became a mail carrier for La Poste, and had three children. In 2004, she made a minor screen acting comeback, appearing in one episode of the French television series La Crim'.

Besse died at 56 on 29 May 2022, at her home in Flayosc, Var.

== Filmography ==
Year	Title	Role	Notes
1981	Beau Pere	Marion	
1982	On s'en fout... nous on s'aime	Nathalie	
1982	Mora	Aline	
