= L'Étudiante (film) =

1988 film by Claude Pinoteau

- Theatrical release poster
- Directed by: Claude Pinoteau
- Screenplay by: Danièle Thompson; Claude Pinoteau
- Dialogue by: Danièle Thompson
- Produced by: Alain Poiré
- Starring: Sophie Marceau; Vincent Lindon; Élisabeth Vitali; Jean-Claude Leguay
- Cinematography: Yves Rodallec
- Edited by: Marie-Josèphe Yoyotte
- Music by: Vladimir Cosma
- Production companies: Gaumont; TF1 Films Production; Cecchi Gori Group Tiger Cinematografica
- Distributed by: Gaumont Distribution (France); Columbia TriStar Films Italia (Italy)
- Release dates: 5 October 1988 (France); 23 December 1988 (Italy)
- Running time: 103 minutes
- Countries: France; Italy
- Language: French

L'Étudiante (lit. 'The Student') is a 1988 romantic comedy-drama film directed by Claude Pinoteau, who co-wrote the screenplay with Danièle Thompson, and starring Sophie Marceau, Vincent Lindon, Élisabeth Vitali and Jean-Claude Leguay. An international co-production between France and Italy, the film follows an ambitious teaching student, busy preparing for her final exams, whose studies are interrupted by a passionate affair with a musician. The film was released in French theaters on 10 October 1988 and recorded 1,583,067 admissions in France.

== Plot ==
Valentine Ezquerra is a smart, ambitious 21-year-old Classics student at Sorbonne University and part-time schoolteacher who is busy preparing for the Agrégation de Lettres classiques. Three months before her final exams, Valentine meets Édouard Jansen, a 28-year-old aspiring composer and member of a jazz rock band, on a ski trip. Smitten with Valentine, Édouard follows her to the Gare de Lyon, and she agrees to a date with him, initially looking for a one-night stand as she has no time for romance. However, as they become acquainted on their first date, Valentine realizes that Édouard is not as shallow as she thought, and they end up sleeping together.

The next day, Édouard leaves on a tour of France with his band, and Valentine moves into a shared apartment. Valentine and Édouard meet again, and they soon begin a passionate relationship, talking regularly on the phone whenever they are apart. Whenever Édouard finds time between live gigs and studio recordings, he meets with Valentine, who, in turn, stays awake all night waiting for Édouard's calls or takes the train from Paris to Dijon to see him. The pair's conflicting schedules—Valentine is studying for her written exam, while Édouard is composing a film score theme—make it increasingly difficult for them to be together. Édouard also cheats on Valentine with his bandmate Patricia.

On the evening Valentine celebrates passing her written exam, the two argue bitterly after an encounter with Édouard's ex-wife makes Valentine jealous, and accuse each other of selfishness, leading Édouard to admit he has been suffering a creative block. A few days later, when Édouard asks Valentine to move in with him, she happily accepts. However, when she discovers Édouard's infidelity—he had accidentally recorded a conversation with his bandmate on the answering machine in which he both recounts his affair with Patricia and questions his relationship with Valentine—Valentine angrily breaks up with him. Édouard also learns that he has been passed over for the film score in favor of another composer.

On the day of Valentine's oral exam at the Sorbonne, Édouard bursts into the lecture hall and attempts to reconcile with Valentine just before she is due to take her exam. During her exam, Valentine breaks down in tears as she draws parallels between her dissertation of Molière's The Misanthrope and her relationship with Édouard, sending him a message: "If you love me, accept me as I am. I will not change. Accept me as I am, and I'll accept you as you are." Afterwards, Valentine and Édouard kiss and embrace outside the Sorbonne.

== Cast ==
- Sophie Marceau as Valentine Ezquerra
- Vincent Lindon as Édouard Jansen
- Élisabeth Vitali as Céline Jolivet
- Jean-Claude Leguay as Charly
- Elena Pompei as Patricia
- Roberto Attias as Philippe
- Brigitte Chamarande as Claire
- Christian Pereira as Serge
- Beppe Chierici as the apparitor
- Nathalie Mann as Alexandra
- Anne Macina as Laura
- Janine Souchon as the lady with the dog
- Jacqueline Noëlle as the supervisor
- Marc-André Brunet as Victor
- Marie-Christine Barrault as herself (uncredited)
- Élie Chouraqui as himself (uncredited)

== Production ==
The film was shot primarily in Paris, with locations including Sorbonne University, the Pont Neuf, the Place Georges-Mulot and the Centre Pompidou. Filming also took place in Dijon, at the Dijon-Ville station, the Théâtre des Feuillants and the Place François-Rude. The meeting between Valentine and Édouard took place at the Méribel ski resort in the French Alps.
