= Judith Godrèche =

French actress and author (born 1972)

- Judith Godrèche, director, at the 2026 Busan International Film Festival (BIFF) in Busan, South Korea for "A Girl's Story".
- Born: 23 March 1972 (age 54); Paris, France
- Occupations: Actress, author, film director, screenwriter, activist
- Years active: 1985–present
- Spouses: Philippe Michel (m. 1996; div. 1996) Dany Boon (m. 1998; div. 2002)
- Partner: Maurice Barthélemy (2004–2014)
- Children: 2

Judith Godrèche (French pronunciation: [ʒydit ɡɔdʁɛʃ]; born 23 March 1972 in Paris) is a French actress, author and feminist activist, who has appeared in more than 30 films.

== Early life ==
Judith Godrèche was born in the 17th arrondissement of Paris. Her father is a psychoanalyst, and her mother a child therapist. Her parents separated when she was eight years old. Her father is Jewish; his parents were Holocaust survivors from Poland and Russia who changed their surname from Goldreich. After being discovered for her first role at the age of 14, Godrèche left school and moved away from her parents to begin her acting career. In 1987, at the age of 14, she was in a relationship with director Benoît Jacquot, 25 years her senior, who first directed her in the film Les mendiants and later made The Disenchanted with her. In later years, Godrèche would accuse Jacquot of grooming and sexually abusing her.

== Career ==
Her early work included commercial modeling for a Japanese chocolate maker, as well as a teen magazine. Her first film appearance was as Claudia Cardinale's daughter in L'été prochain. At 14, she obtained her first major role, in Jacquot's Les mendiants, with Dominique Sanda.

In 1989, Godrèche starred in Jacques Doillon's The 15 Year Old Girl with Melvil Poupaud, which brought her fame. The following year, she turned to a full-time career in film. In 1990, she was nominated for the César Award for Most Promising Actress for her performance in Jacquot's La désenchantée.

In 1991, she was a member of the jury at the 41st Berlin International Film Festival.

In 1995, her novel Point de côté was published in France by Broché Publishers to good reviews.

Godrèche was not well known to American audiences until Patrice Leconte's Ridicule was released in 1996. The film introduced her to Americans in the role of Mathilde de Bellegarde. In 1998 she starred with Leonardo DiCaprio and Jeremy Irons in The Man in the Iron Mask.

Godrèche was nominated for a 2002 César Award for Best Supporting Actress for her performance in the surprise European hit, L'Auberge espagnole.

Her first record inspired from the film Toutes les filles pleurent was released by Because Music.

In 2012, she began playing the continuing character of Claudette Von Jurgens in season 3 of Royal Pains.

Godrèche's performance as Charlotte in the film The Overnight has led to her being called a "breakout" star of 2015. She is also starring in an upcoming HBO comedy about a French actress who moves to Los Angeles.

== Personal life ==
Godrèche had a long-term relationship since 1987 with Benoît Jacquot who was 25 years her senior. She was briefly married to Philippe Michel, an architect, in 1996. She was later married to comedian Dany Boon from 1998 to 2002. Together they have a son, Noé, born 4 September 1999. In 2004, she began a relationship with actor and director Maurice Barthélemy, who is the father of her daughter, Tess, born 19 April 2005. The couple split in 2014.

Godrèche has considered formally converting to Judaism as an adult, which she attributed to her close relationship with her paternal grandparents.

=== Sexual violence charges against Benoît Jacquot and Jacques Doillon ===
In February 2024, Godrèche filed police charges against Jacques Doillon and Benoît Jacquot for sexual assault committed in the 1980s when she was a minor. At the 49th César Awards on 23 February 2024, Godrèche gave a speech on sexual violence and addressed France's omertà around #MeToo. In May 2024, Godrèche was added to the Official Selection at the 77th Cannes Film Festival, where she presented her short film Moi aussi (Me Too). The film highlights the stories of victims of sexual violence. It was created after Godrèche made a public appeal through her Instagram account, after which around 6,000 people replied. It was screened during the opening ceremony of the festival's Un Certain Regard section and free to the public on 15 May as part of the Cinéma de la Plage program.

On 1 July 2024, Jacquot and Doillon were each questioned over Godrèche's rape and sexual assault claim. The two directors would also be taken into custody by the Juvenile Protection Brigade. On 3 July 2024, Jacquot was criminally charged with raping two other actresses.

== Filmography ==
=== Actress ===
==== Film ====
Year	Title	Role
1985	L'été prochain	Nickie
1987	Les mendiants	Catherine
1987	Les saisons du plaisir	Ophélie
1988	La méridienne	Stéphanie
1988	Un été d'orages	Laurence
1989	Sons	Florence jr.
1989	The 15 Year Old Girl	Juliette
1990	The Disenchanted (La désenchantée)	Beth
1991	Ferdydurke	Zoo
1991	Paris Awakens (Paris s'éveille)	Louise
1992	Emma Zunz TV	Emma Zunz
1993	Tango	Madeleine
1993	Une nouvelle vie	Lise
1994	Grande petite	Bénédicte
1995	L'aube à l'envers	
1995	Beaumarchais, l'insolent	Marie-Antoinette
1995	Ridicule	Mathilde
1997	Le rouge et le noir	Mathilde de La Mole
1998	The Man in the Iron Mask	Christine Bellefort
1998	Bimboland	Cécile Bussy
1999	Entropy	Stella
2001	South Kensington	Susanna
2002	L'auberge espagnole	Anne-Sophie
2002	Parlez-moi d'amour	Justine
2002	France Boutique	Estelle
2003	Quicksand	Lela Forin
2004	Tu vas rire mais je te quitte	Elise Vérone
2004	Tout pour plaire	Marie
2004	Papa	Maman
2006	Human Bomb	
2007	Je veux pas que tu t'en ailles	Carla
2008	Home Sweet Home	
2009	Fais-moi plaisir!	Claire
2010	Potiche	Elisabeth
2010	Holiday	Nadine Trémois
2011	The Art of Love (L'art d'aimer)	Amélie
2013	Stoker	Doctor Jacquin
2015	The Overnight	Charlotte
2018	Under the Eiffel Tower	Louise
2019	The Climb	Ava

==== Television ====
Year	Title	Role	Notes
2020	Medical Police	Anaïs Desjardins	Netflix series
2023	Icon of French Cinema	Herself	Television miniseries
2025	Des gens bien ordinaires		Television miniseries

=== Director and writer ===
==== Film ====
Year	Title
2010	Toutes les filles pleurent
2024	Moi aussi
2026	A Girl's Story

==== Television ====
Year	Title	Notes
2023	Icon of French Cinema	Television miniseries
