= Carrément à l'Ouest =

- Directed by: Jacques Doillon
- Written by: Jacques Doillon
- Produced by: Richard Djoudi; Marin Karmitz (uncredited)
- Cinematography: Caroline Champetier
- Edited by: Catherine Quesemand
- Music by: Dom Farkas; Dom Lemou; Jean Lemou
- Production companies: Diba Films; France 3 Cinéma
- Distributed by: Les Films du Losange
- Release date: May 23, 2001
- Running time: 99 minutes
- Country: France
- Language: French

Carrément à l'Ouest is a 2001 French comedy drama directed and written by Jacques Doillon. It was screened in the Un Certain Regard section at the 2001 Cannes Film Festival.

== Cast ==
- Lou Doillon as Fred
- Caroline Ducey as Silvia
- Guillaume Saurrel as Alex
- Camille Clavel as François, the student
- Xavier Villeneuve as Xavier, Alex's brother
- Hafed Benotman as Ben, François's friend
- Joshua Phillips as Hotel clerk
- Antoine Chain as Customer
- Arthur Chain as Hotel bellboy
- Aurore Giradolle as Girl in night-club
- Hervé Duhamel as Cash machine customer
- Hassan Dramé as 18 Arrondissement boy

== Islid Le Besco controversy ==
In February 2024, French actress Isild Le Besco alleged that while she was trying to star in the film in the year 2000, Carrément à l'Ouest director Jacques Doillon attempted to sexually blackmail her.
