= Le Jeune Werther =

1993 film

- DVD cover
- Directed by: Jacques Doillon
- Written by: Jacques Doillon
- Produced by: Alain Sarde
- Starring: Ismaël Jolé-Ménébhi
- Cinematography: Christophe Pollock
- Edited by: Nicole Lubtchansky
- Music by: Philippe Sarde
- Distributed by: Pan-Européenne Distribution
- Release date: 31 March 1993
- Running time: 94 minutes
- Country: France
- Language: French

Le Jeune Werther is a 1993 French drama film directed and written by Jacques Doillon. It was entered into the 43rd Berlin International Film Festival, where it won the Blue Angel Award.

== Cast ==
- Ismaël Jolé-Ménébhi as Ismael
- Faye Anastasia as Faye
- Jessica Tharaud as Jessica
- Mirabelle Rousseau as Mirabelle
- Miren Capello as Miren
- Pierre Mezerette as Pierre
- Simon Clavière as Simon
- Sunny Lebrati as Sunny
- Thomas Brémond as Theo
- Pierre Encrèvé as Headmaster
- Margot Abascal as Guillaume's Sister
- Hervé Duhamel as French Teacher
- Marie de Laubier as Maths Teacher
- Ève Guillou as History Teacher
