= Barr, Bas-Rhin =

Barr
- Commune
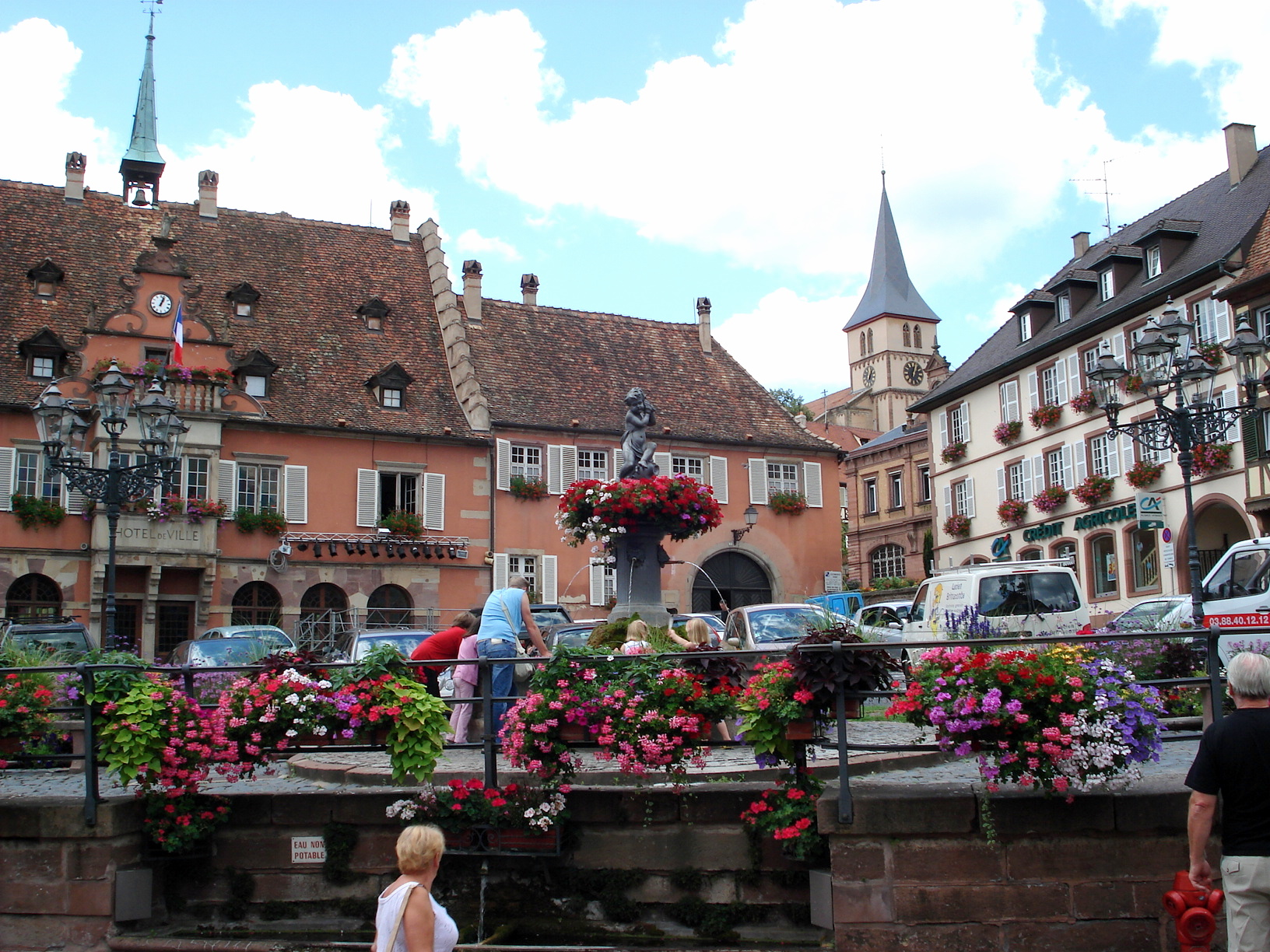
- Town square

- Coat of arms
- Location of Barr
- Location within France Location within Grand Est
- Coordinates: 48°24′32″N 7°27′02″E
- Country: France
- Region: Grand Est
- Department: Bas-Rhin
- Arrondissement: Sélestat-Erstein
- Canton: Obernai

Government
  - Mayor (2020–2026): Nathalie Ernst
- Area^{1}: 20.61 km^{2} (7.96 sq mi)
- Highest elevation: 971 m (3,186 ft)
- Lowest elevation: 176 m (577 ft)
- Population (2023): 7,057
  - Density: 342.4/km^{2} (886.8/sq mi)
- Time zone: UTC+01:00 (CET)
  - Summer (DST): UTC+02:00 (CEST)
- INSEE/Postal code: 67021 /67140
- ^{1} French Land Register data, which excludes lakes, ponds, glaciers > 1 km^{2} (0.386 sq mi or 247 acres) and river estuaries.

Barr (French pronunciation: [baʁ]; in Alsatian Borr) is a commune in the Bas-Rhin department in the Alsace region of north-eastern France.

The inhabitants of the commune are known as Barrois or Barroises.

The commune has been awarded "three flowers" by the National Council of Towns and Villages in Bloom in the Competition of cities and villages in Bloom.

== Geography ==
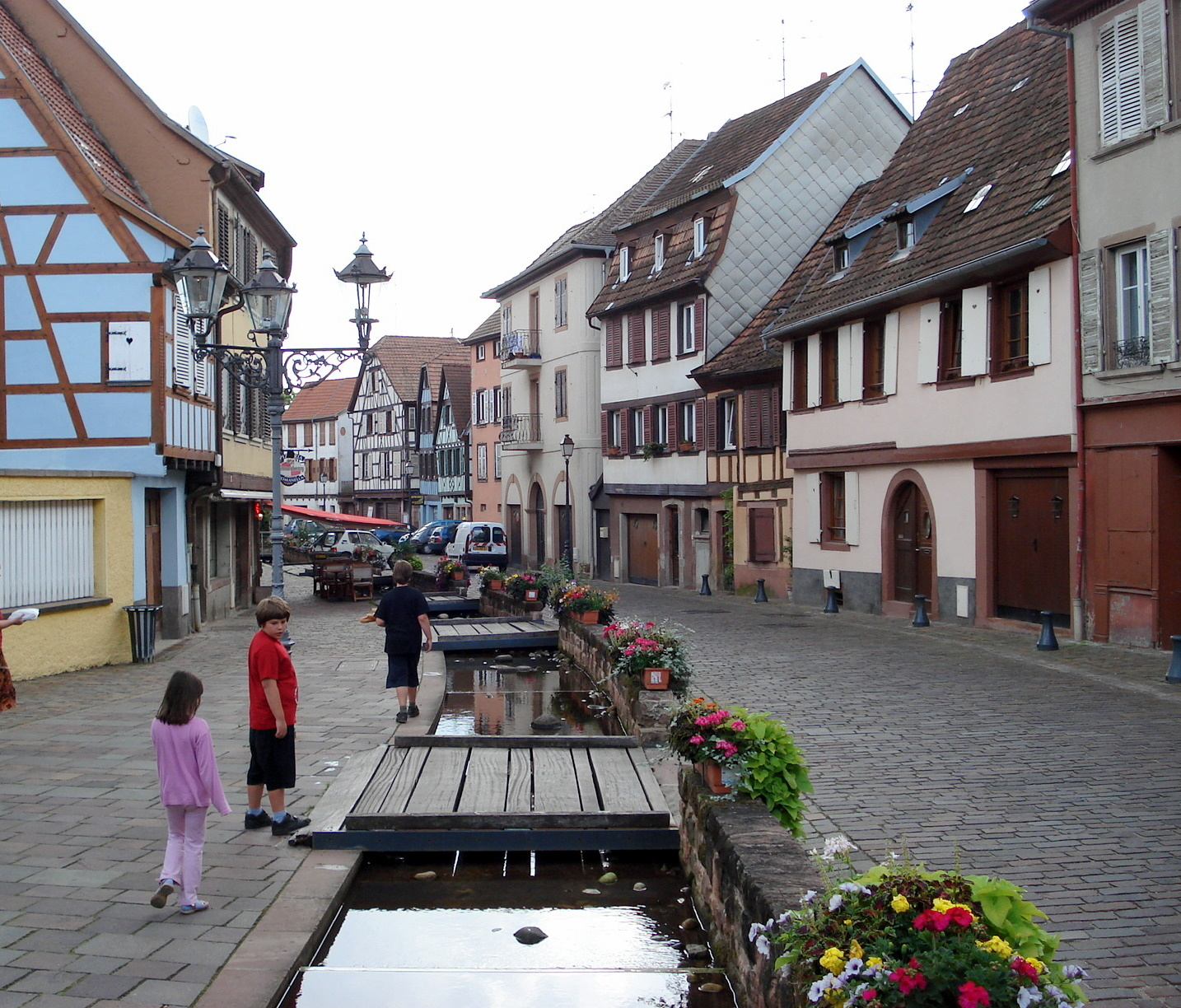
A typical street in Barr

Barr lies in the foothills of the Vosges Mountains at the foot of Mont Sainte-Odile some 25 km (15 miles) south-west of Strasbourg and 5 km (3 miles) north of Epfig. The A35 autoroute passes through the eastern tip of the commune from north to south and Exit 13 lies in the tip of the commune. The D62 runs west through the commune from the exit to Andlau. Access to Barr town is by the D362 from Mittelbergheim in the south, by the D35 from Heiligenstein in the north, and by the D42 which branches from the D1422 north of Gertwiller. The D1422 from Gertwiller in the north runs from north to south through the east of the commune and continues to Saint-Pierre. The D854 goes from the town west through the length of the commune then north to join the D426 in the west. The D426 continues through the western part of the commune to Le Hohwald. The D109 comes from Saint-Nabor in the north to join the D854 in the west of the commune. The D130 branches off the D426 in the west of the commune and goes west to join the D214 at Rothlach. There is also Barr railway station in the town with the railway going north to Gertwiller station and south to Eichhoffen station.

Barr is the wine capital of Alsace with the oldest Alsace wine fair (over 100 years) and an historical "Harvest Festival" which is traditionally held the first weekend of October.

La Kirneck river rises in the west of the commune and flows eastwards through the town and continues east to join the Andlau.

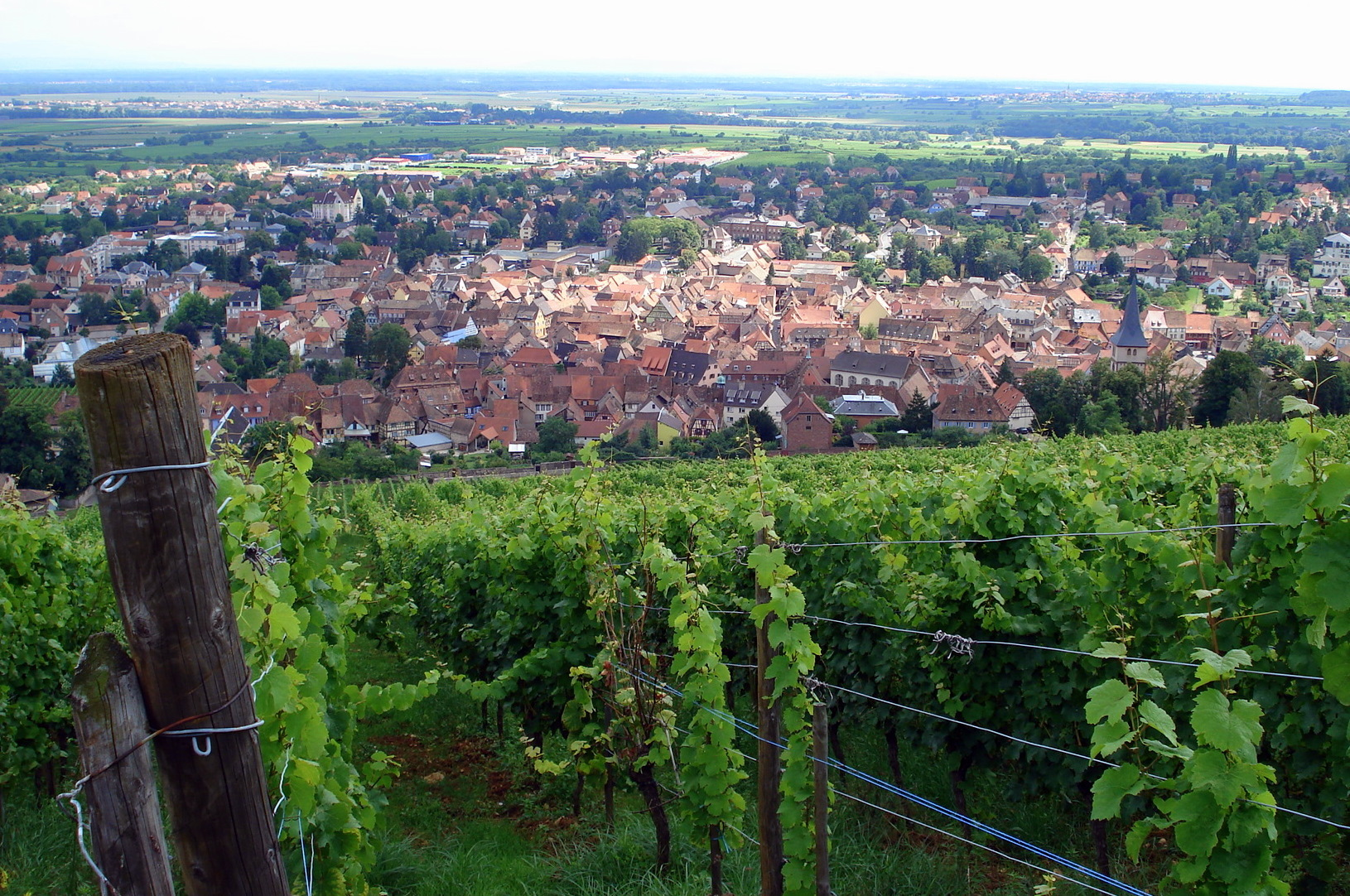
A view over Barr

=== Transport and communication routes ===
- There is a half-hourly TER Grand Est railway service from Barr station.
- The Alsatian Vineyards cycle route (EuroVelo 5) passes through the town.
- The town is included in the Vosges part of the GR 5 hiking trail and E2 European path.
- From 1889 to 1906 the Forest Railway Welschbruch was a narrow-gauge railway along the river Kirneck.

=== Environment ===
Part of the "forest of Landsberg" is located in the commune. This forest has been owned by a forestry group run by six managers since 1800. The forest covers 158 hectares (390 acres) (nearly 25 ha; 60 acres unproductive) spread over 3 communes (Heiligenstein, Barr, and Obernai). It is the subject of a "close to nature forestry" management according to the principles recommended by Prosilva with no clear-felling. It was certified by the Forest Stewardship Council (FSC) in December 2000 and by the Programme for the Endorsement of Forest Certification (PEFC) in December 2002.

== History ==
Although the first written records mentioning the village of Barr as Barru dates from the year 788, historians believe that the site was occupied long before as evidenced by many prehistoric remains of the Iron Age and Bronze Age discovered in the area.

Barr was originally an imperial property, but in 1522 the Habsburgs leased it to Nicolas Ziegler, and converted into Allod or freehold three years later. His son later sold it to the city of Strasbourg. This led to Barr being involved in the Bishop's War of Strasbourg (1592–1604) against the Catholics of Lorraine, which resulted in Barr's castle and many of its houses being razed to the ground in 1592.

During the Thirty Years War it suffered from the Holy Roman Empire, the Swedes, and the French but less than the surrounding villages. During the conflict with Louis XIV in Strasbourg, the town was occupied by the French: the murder of an officer by a resident brought about the burning of the town in retaliation.

Rebuilding was rapid and thereafter Barr had no further disasters although it had to endure the passage of troops that had to be fed.

In the 18th century there was a legal process that lasted nearly a century opposing the ceding of the localities of the Lordship of Barr to the city of Strasbourg, their suzerain, who claimed all the forests of its vassal. In 1763 a first decision attributed the lands to Strasbourg; there was an appeal and it was not until 1836, under the July Monarchy, that the verdict was definitively confirmed.

=== Heraldry ===
Arms of Barr	Blazon: Argent, a portcullis of Sable.

The portcullis in the arms symbolizes the ancestral role of this city as the last barrier on the way to the Mont Sainte-Odile, formerly a sacred place occupied by the Druids.

== Administration ==
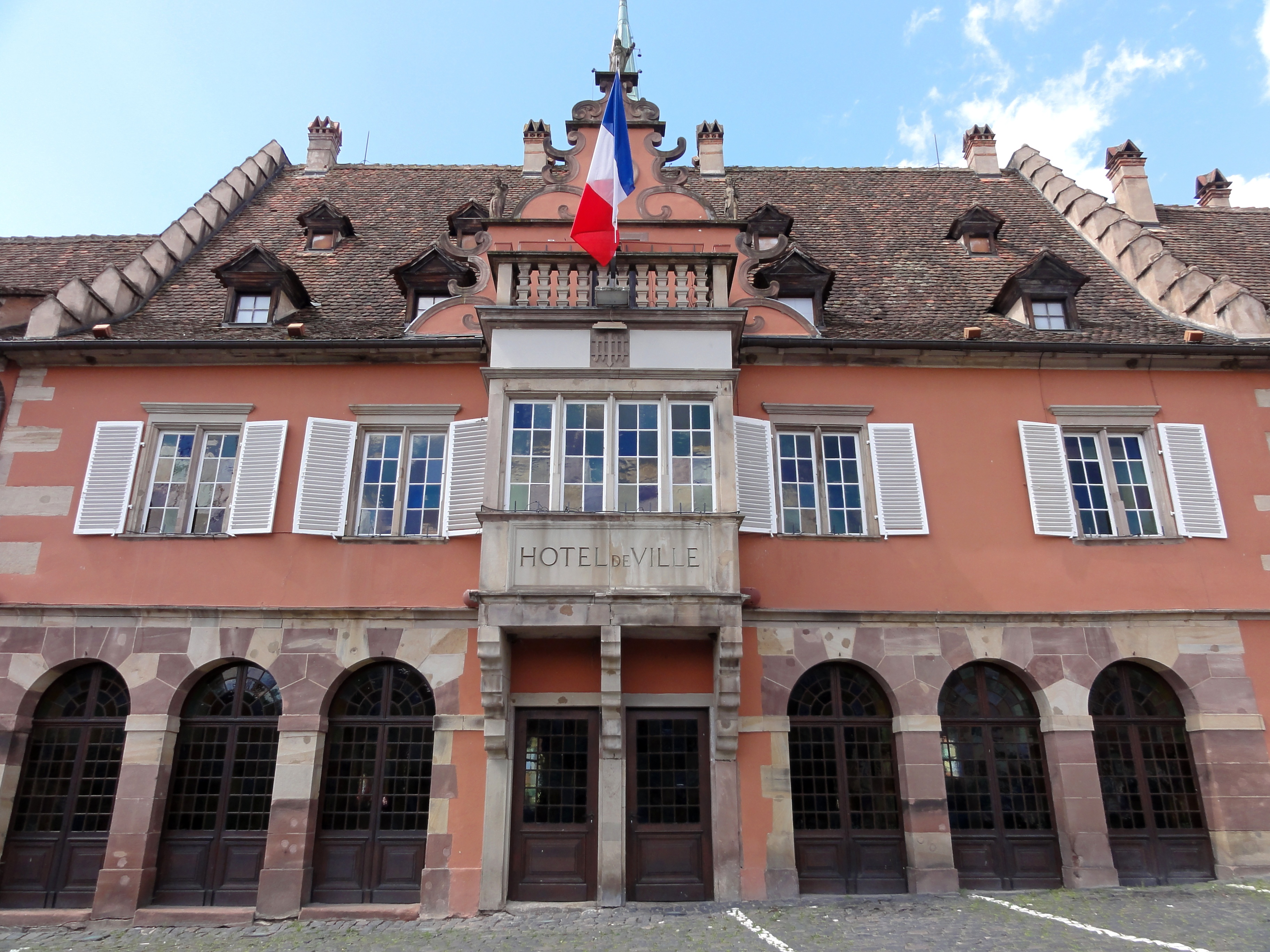
The Town Hall

List of Successive Mayors

From	To	Name	Party	Position
1815		Jacques Dietz		
1962	1971	Louis Klipfel		Farmer
1971	1989	Marcel Krieg		Doctor
1989	1995	Michel Schwanger		
1995	2020	Gilbert Scholly	UMP	VP of Regional Council of Alsace since 1998
2020	2026	Nathalie Ernst		

=== Twinning ===
Barr has twinning associations with:

- Trier (Germany) since 1961.
- Kolda (Senegal) since 1998.

== Demography ==
Historical population

Year	Pop.	±% p.a.
1793	3,771	—
1800	3,996	+0.83%
1806	4,143	+0.60%
1821	4,091	−0.08%
1831	4,324	+0.56%
1836	4,521	+0.90%
1841	4,095	−1.96%
1846	4,185	+0.44%
1851	4,345	+0.75%
1856	4,737	+1.74%
1861	4,877	+0.58%
1866	5,082	+0.83%
1871	5,655	+2.16%
1875	5,945	+1.26%
1880	5,857	−0.30%
1885	5,646	−0.73%
1890	5,678	+0.11%
1895	5,576	−0.36%
1900	5,243	−1.22%

Year	Pop.	±% p.a.
1905	5,022	−0.86%
1910	4,934	−0.35%
1921	4,176	−1.50%
1926	4,185	+0.04%
1931	4,278	+0.44%
1936	4,389	+0.51%
1946	4,430	+0.09%
1954	4,322	−0.31%
1962	4,207	−0.34%
1968	4,268	+0.24%
1975	4,157	−0.38%
1982	4,511	+1.17%
1990	4,839	+0.88%
1999	5,892	+2.21%
2007	6,705	+1.63%
2012	7,052	+1.01%
2017	7,238	+0.52%
2023	7,057	−0.42%

Source: EHESS and INSEE

== Culture and heritage ==
Barr has a very large number of buildings and sites that are registered as historical monuments.

Highlights of some of the sites are:

- The Protestant Church of Saint Martin
- The Protestant and Catholic cemeteries
- Barracks, Saint Martin church - school and organ. The based was built by Stiehr Mockers and the instrument designed by Kriess.
- The old synagogue had to be destroyed in 1982 following the collapse of a corner pillar, but the windows of the synagogue were reused for the benefit of the Meinau oratory and some stones including the Tablets of Stone are displayed in the park of the Elisa Foundation in Strasbourg.
- The Town Hall
- A Coaching Inn
- The Museum of the Folie Marco

The commune has over 500 items that are registered as historical objects.

=== Picture gallery ===
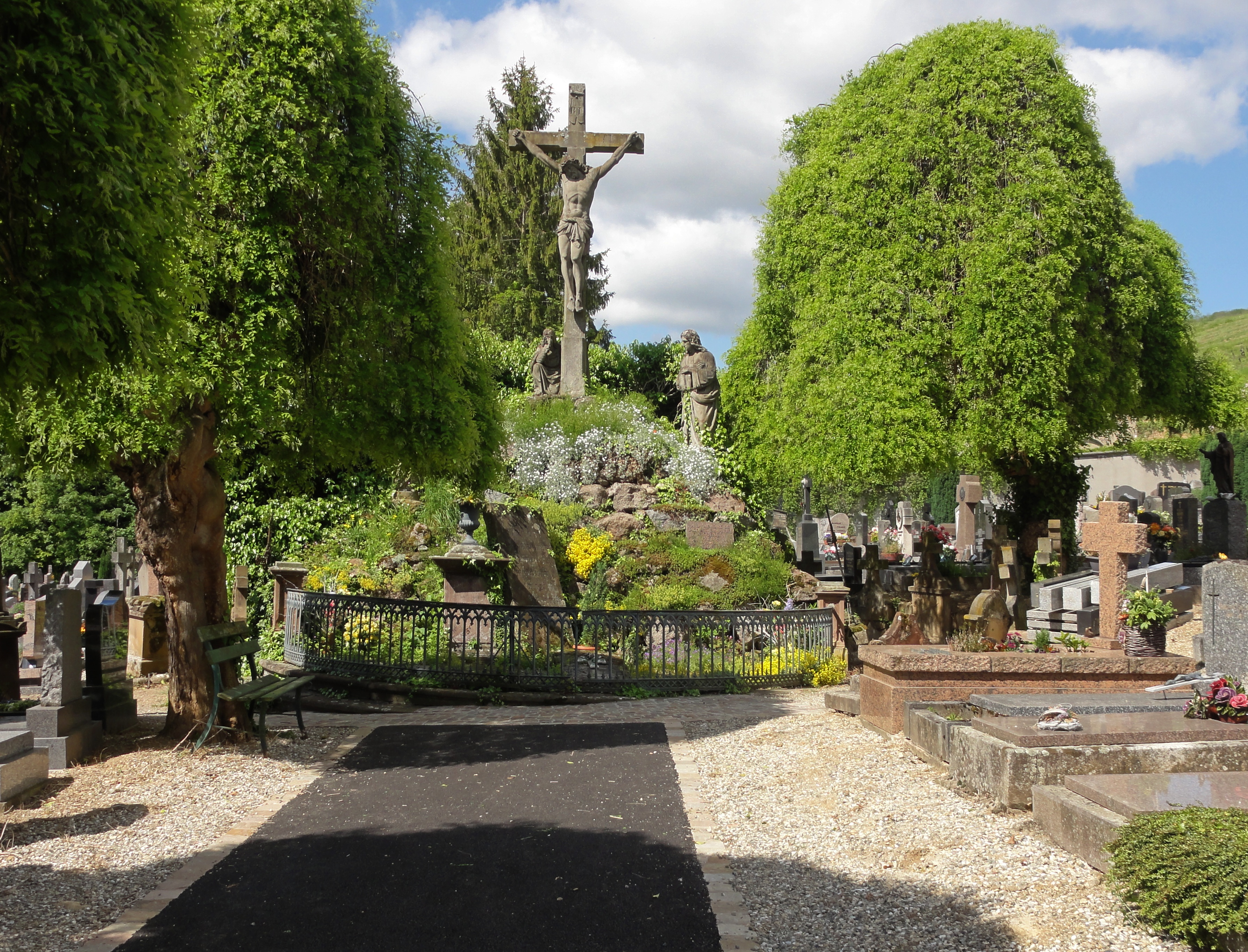
Catholic Cemetery

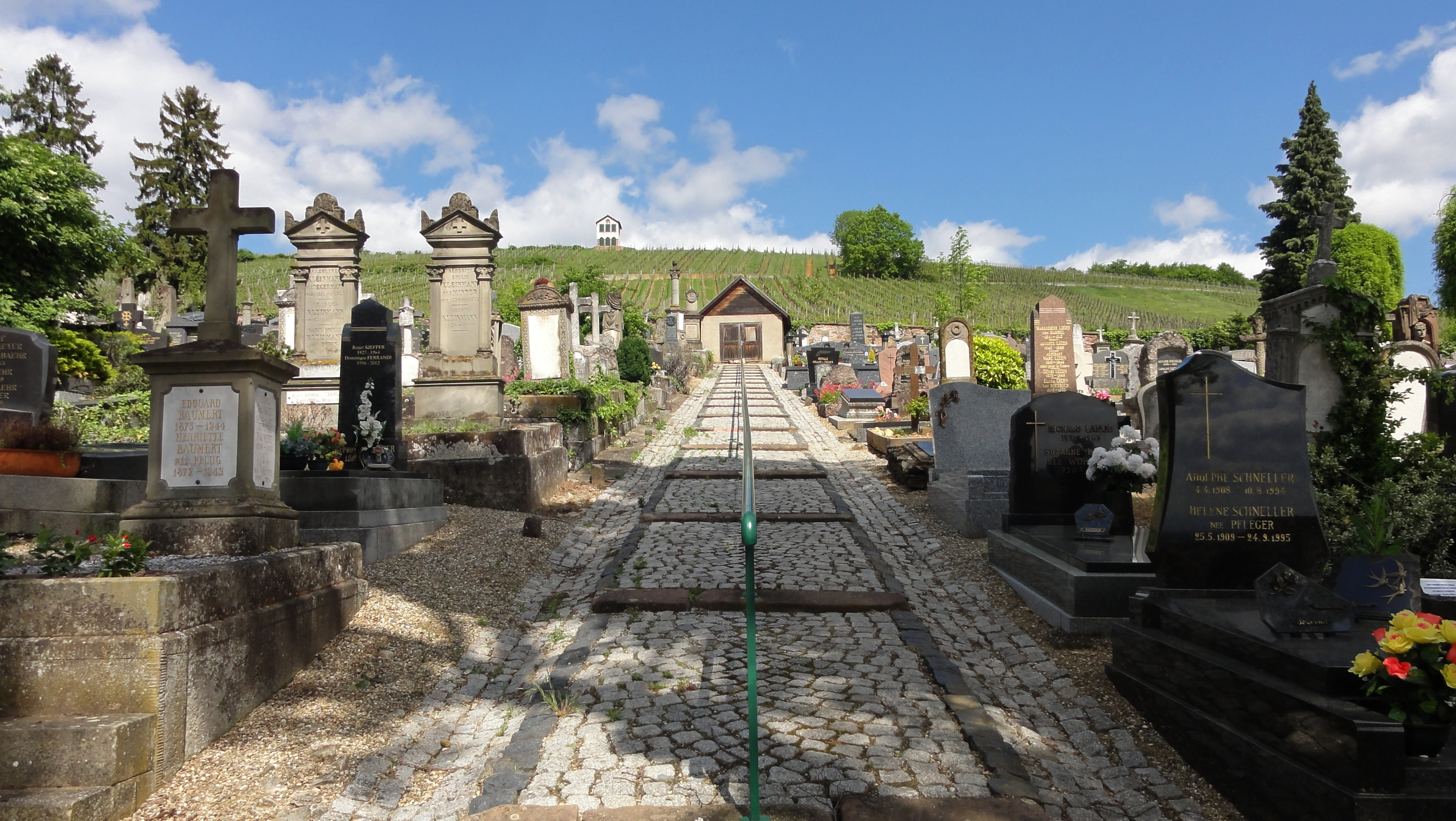
Protestant Cemetery

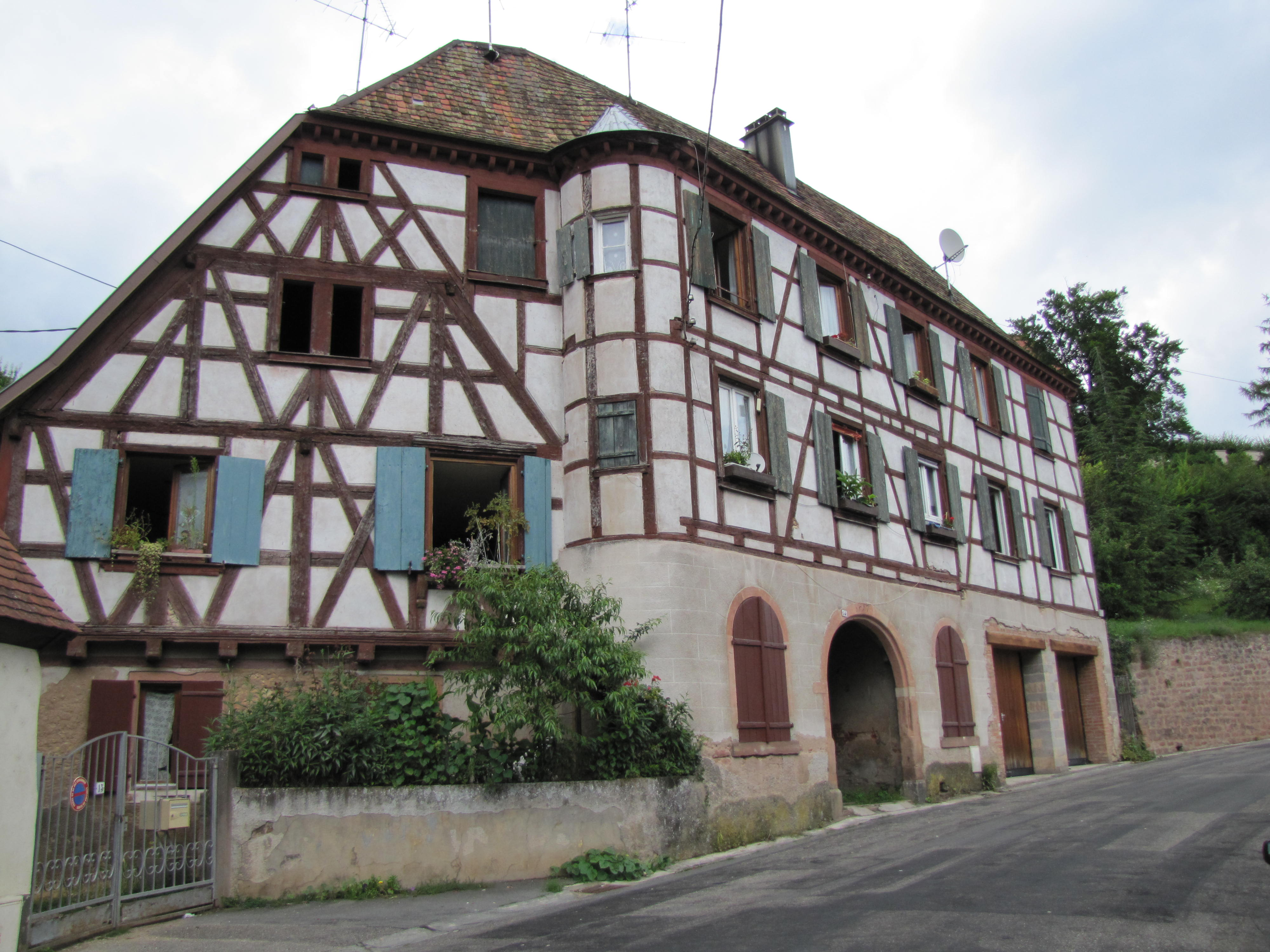
3 Rue de la Stey

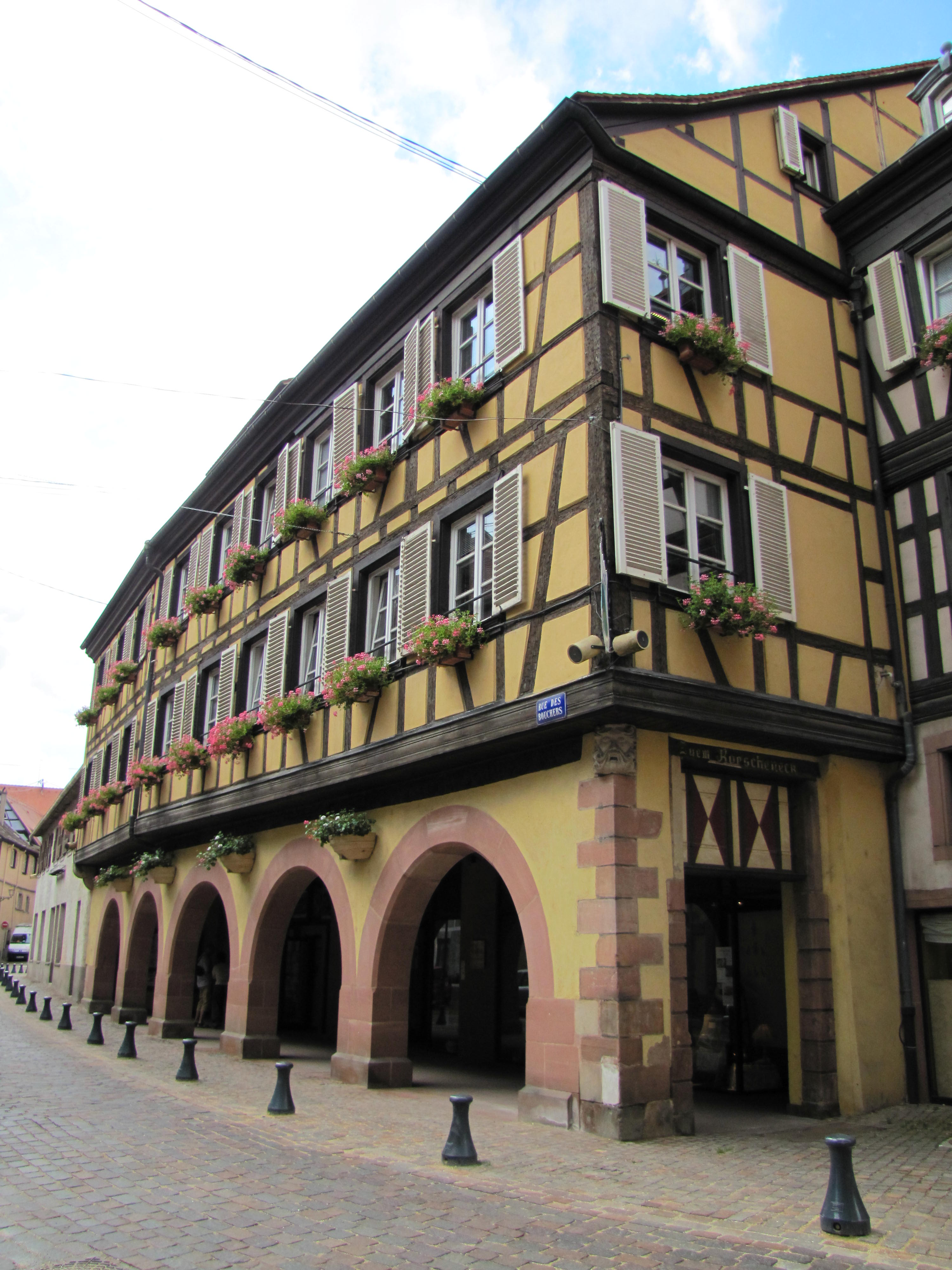
House in the Town Square

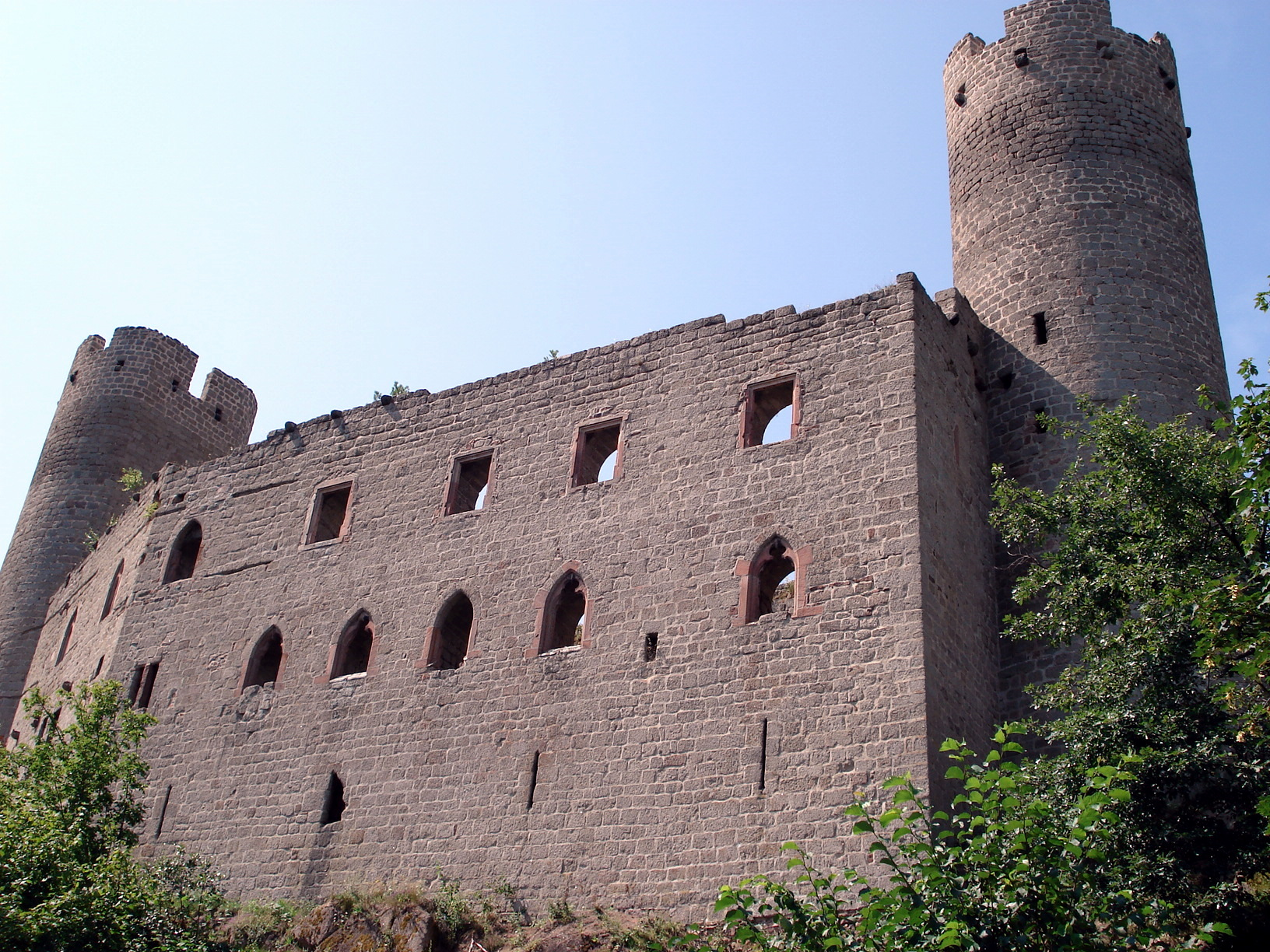
Ruined Chateau

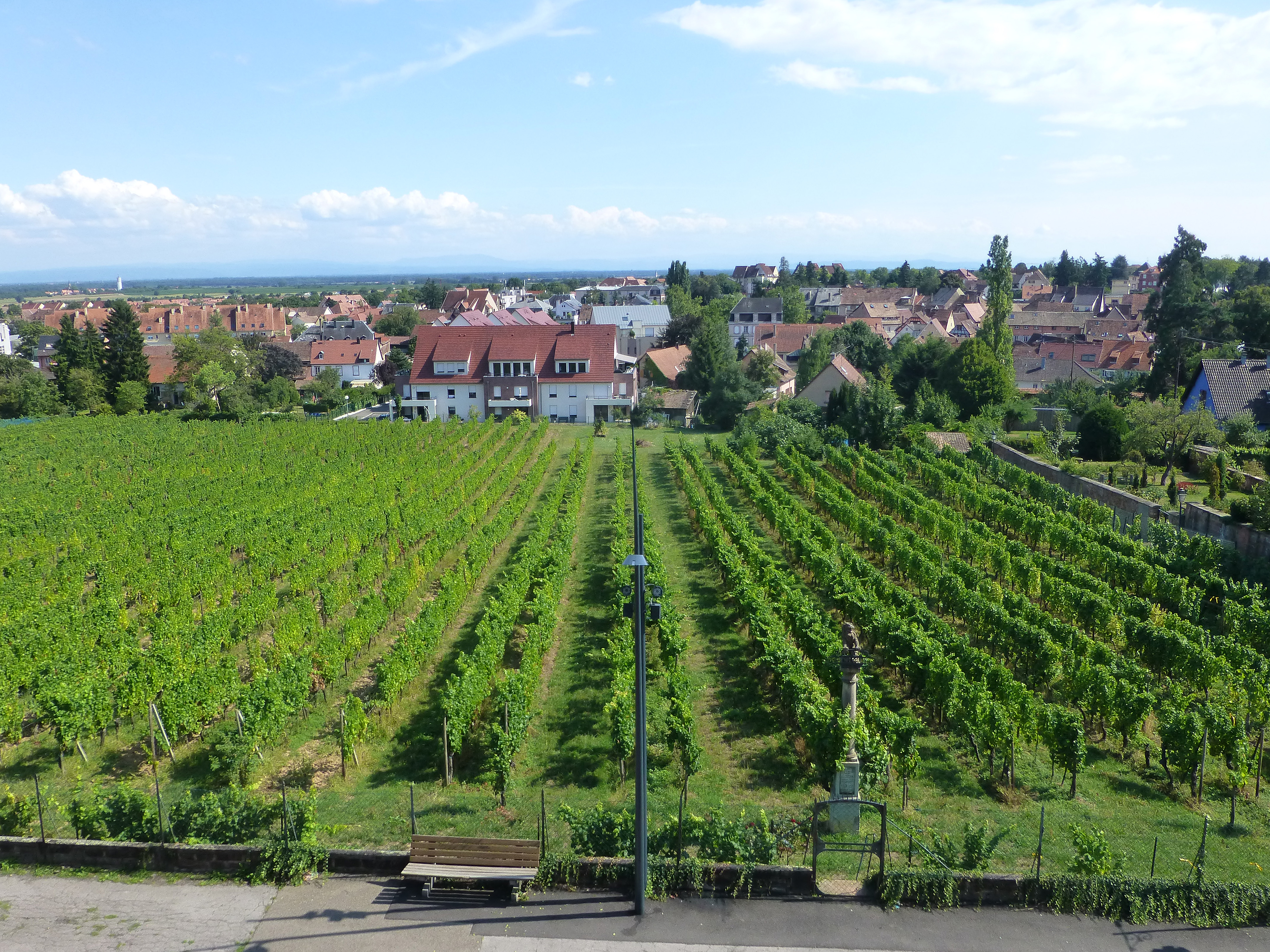
Folie Marco Vineyards

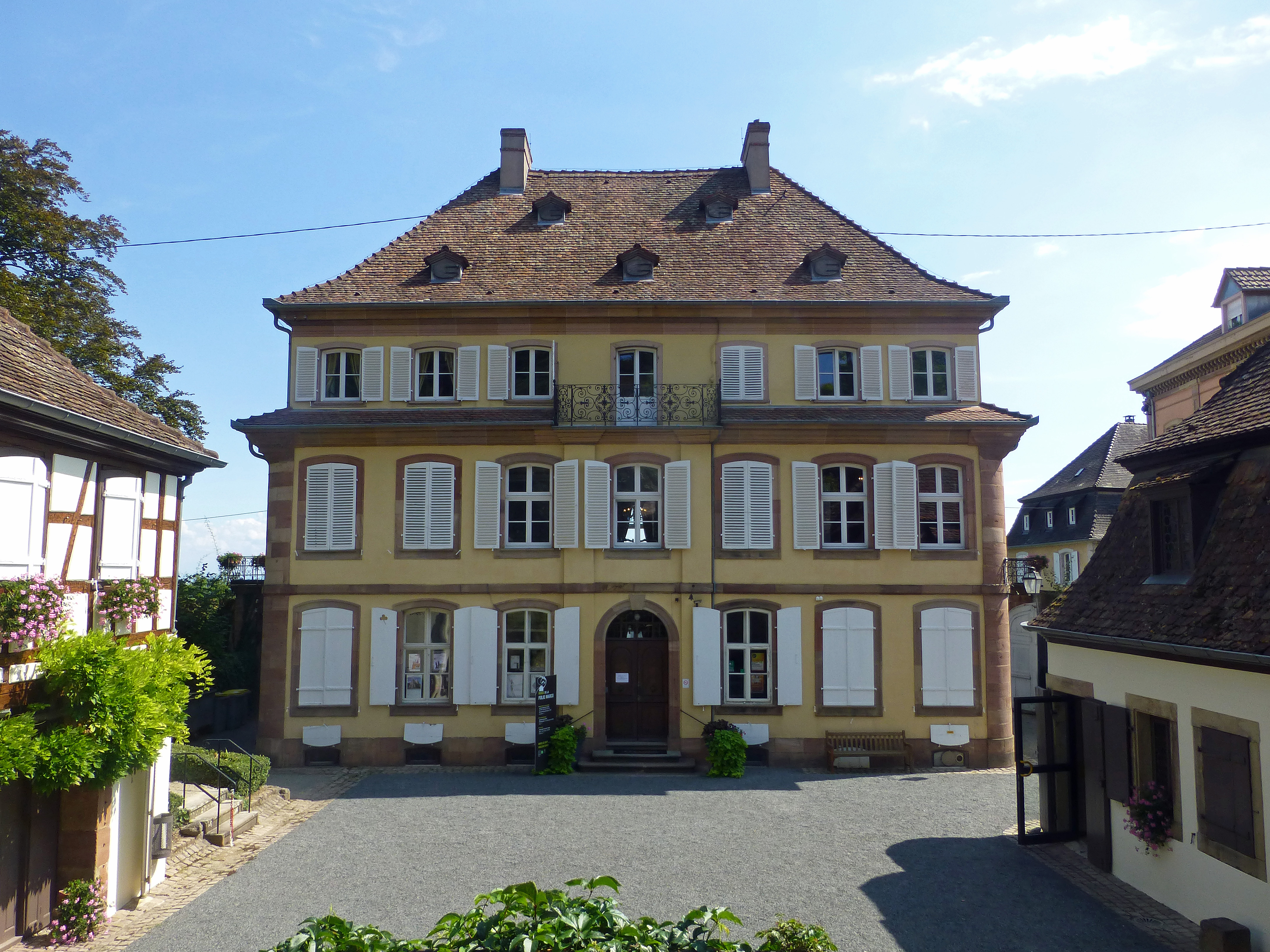
Musée de la Folie Marco

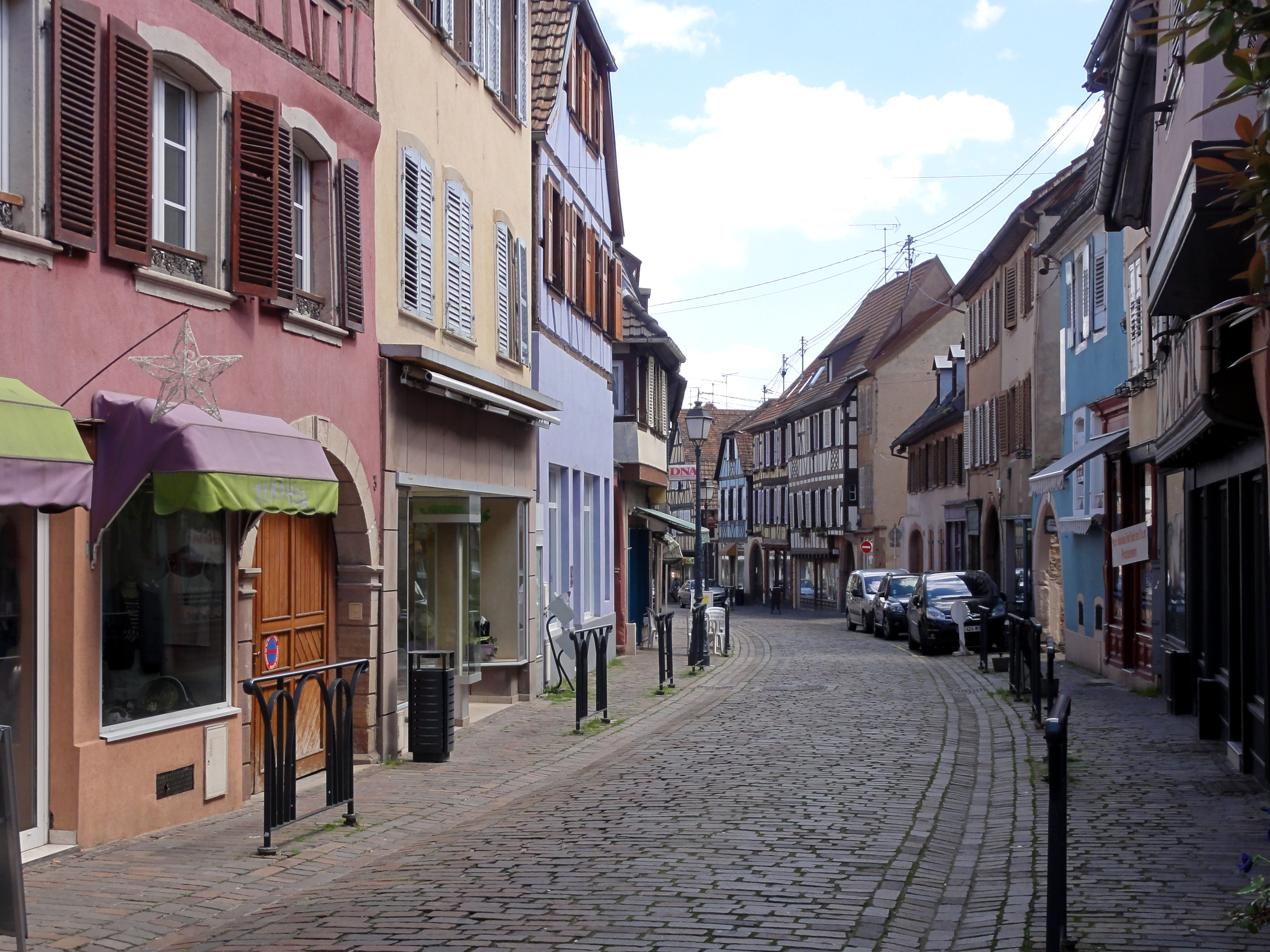
The Main Street

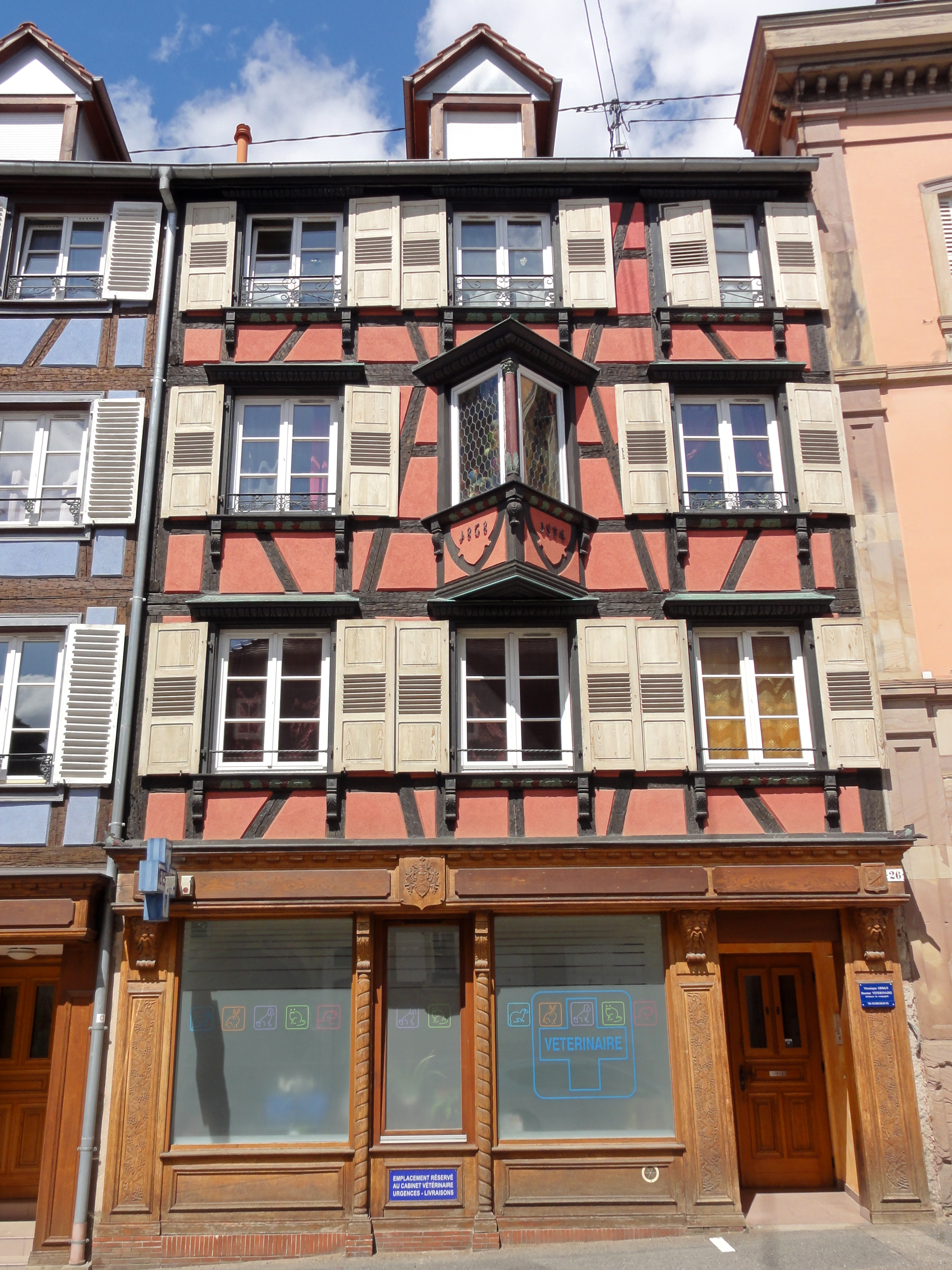
26 Rue du Docteur-Sultzer

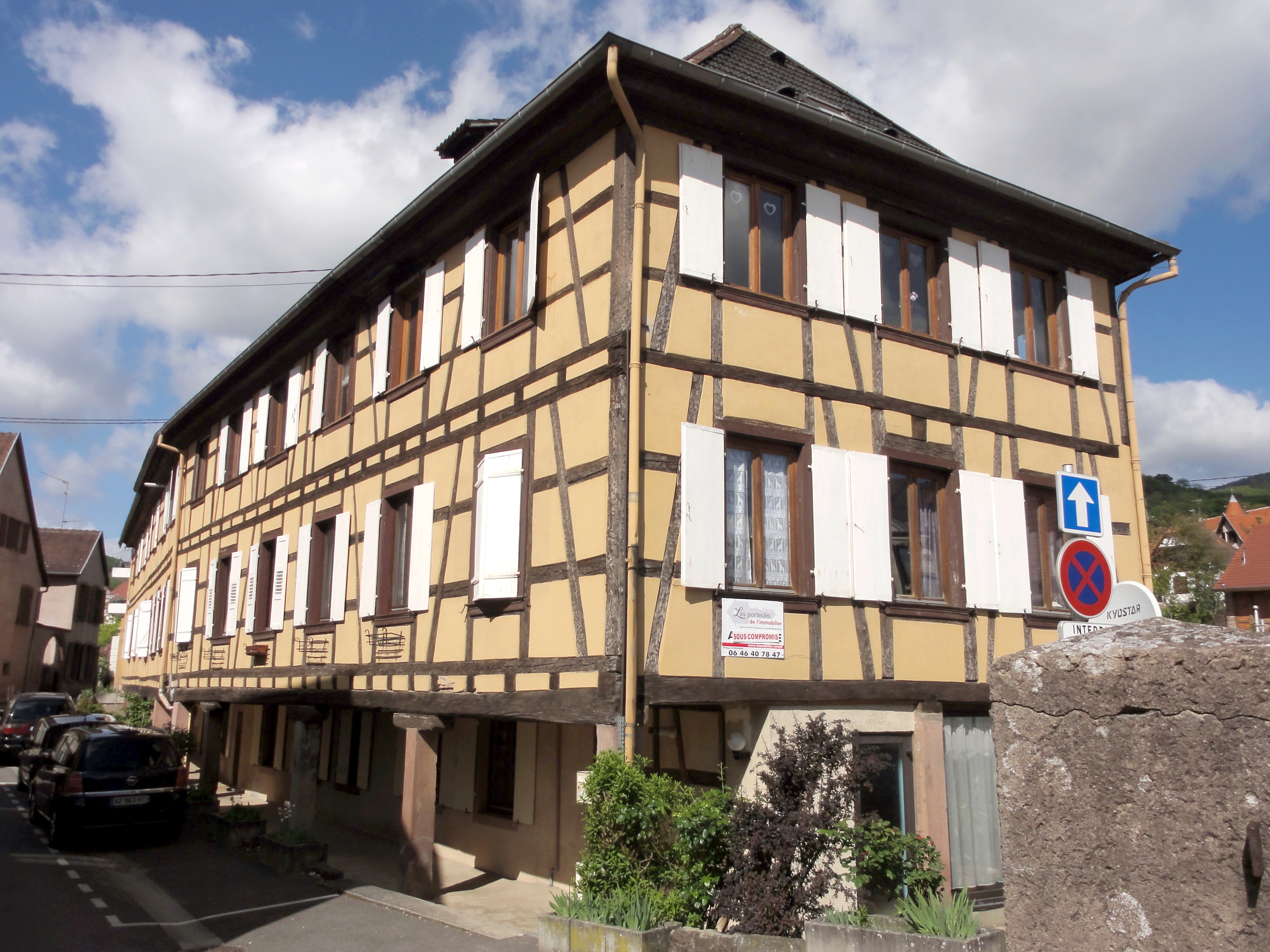
Old shoe factory

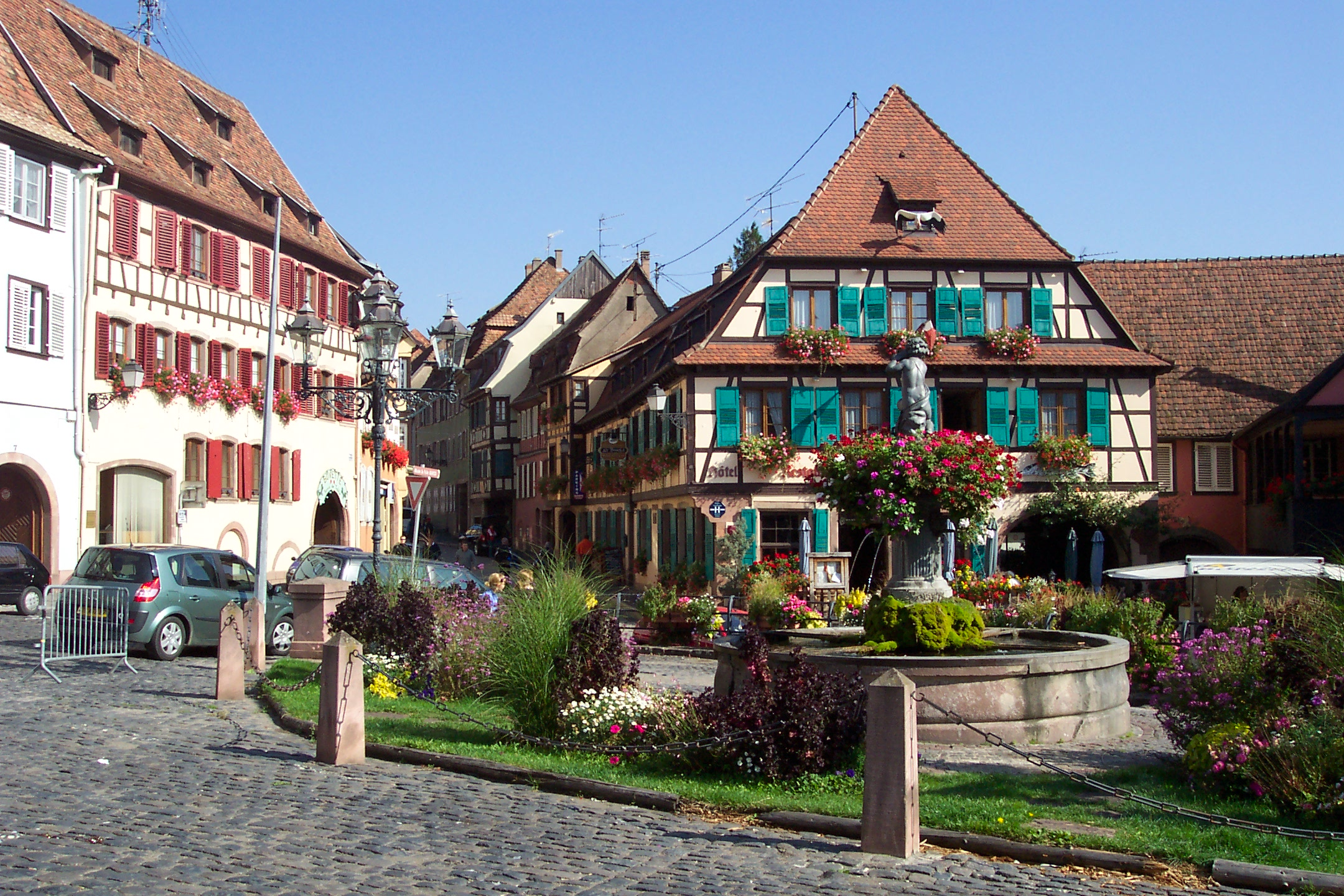
Barr

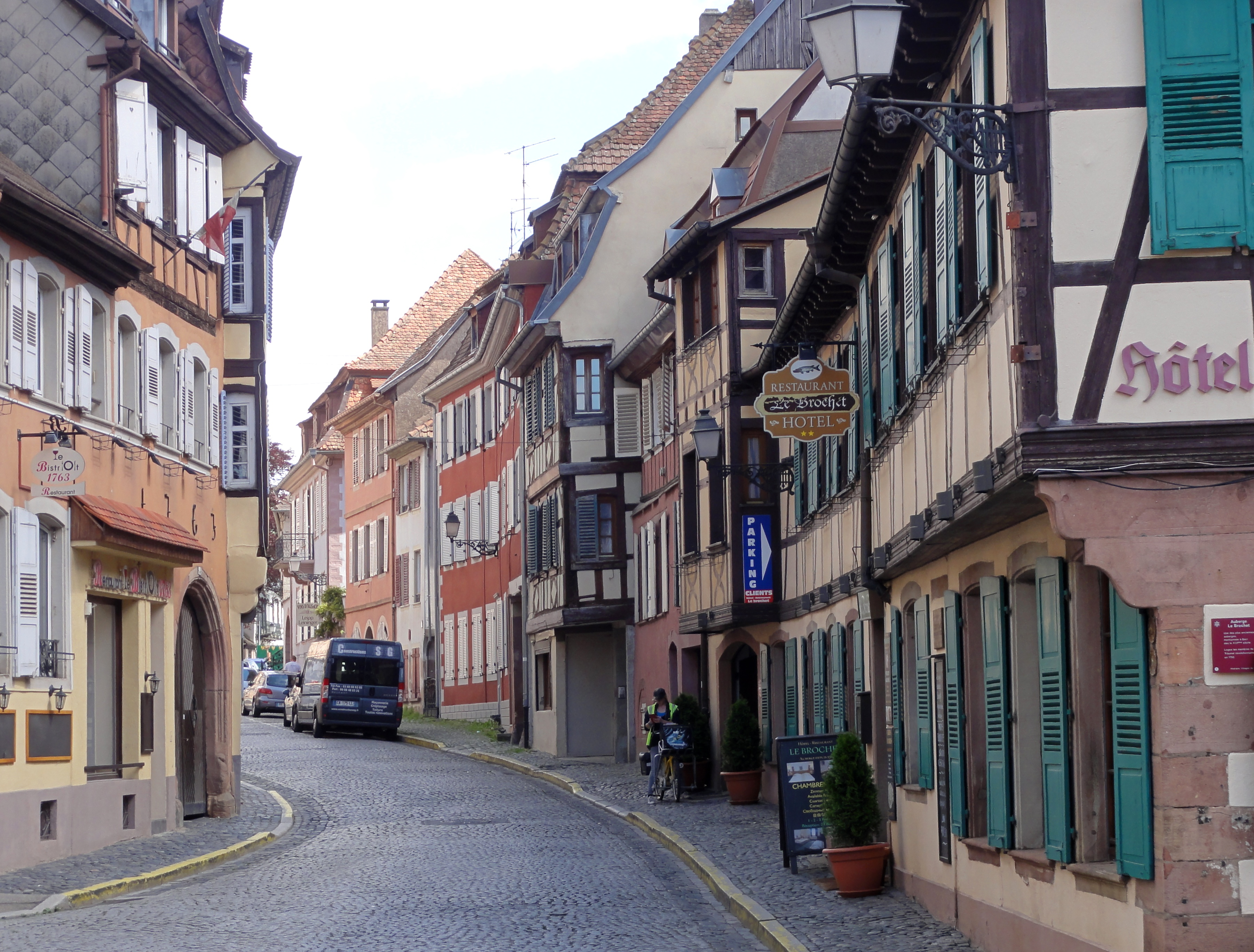
Rue du Docteur-Sulzer

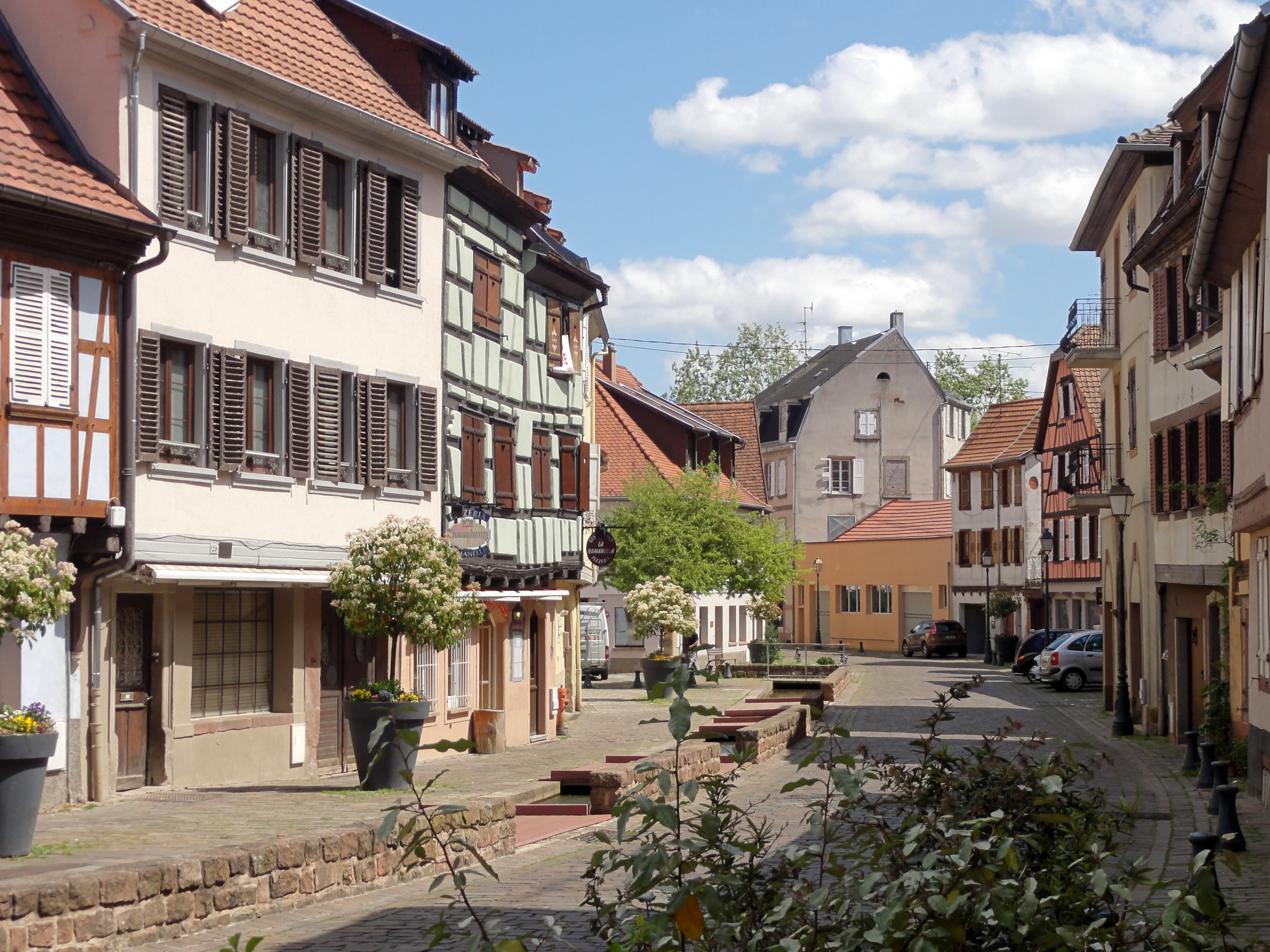
Rue de la Kirneck

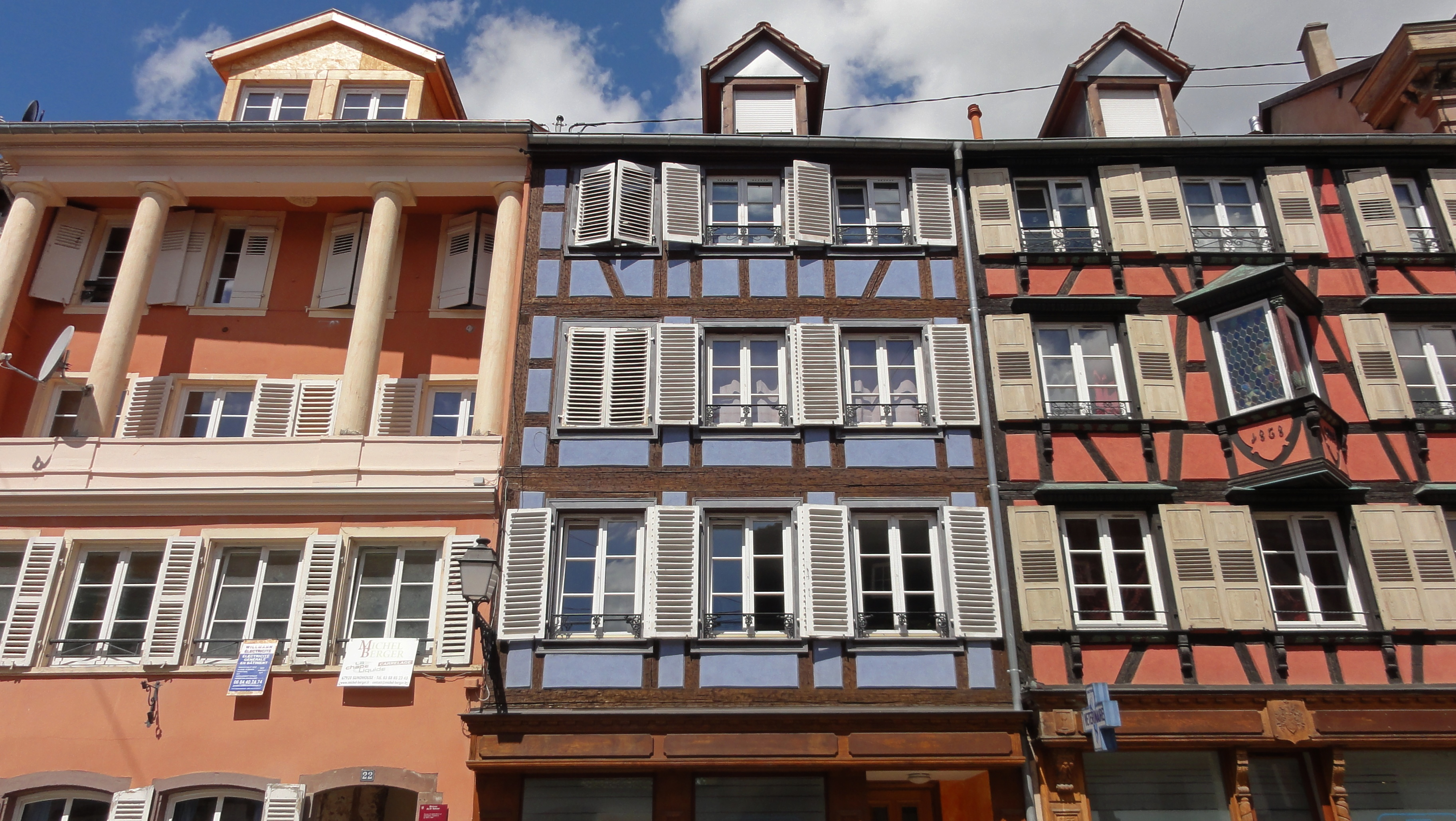
A row of houses

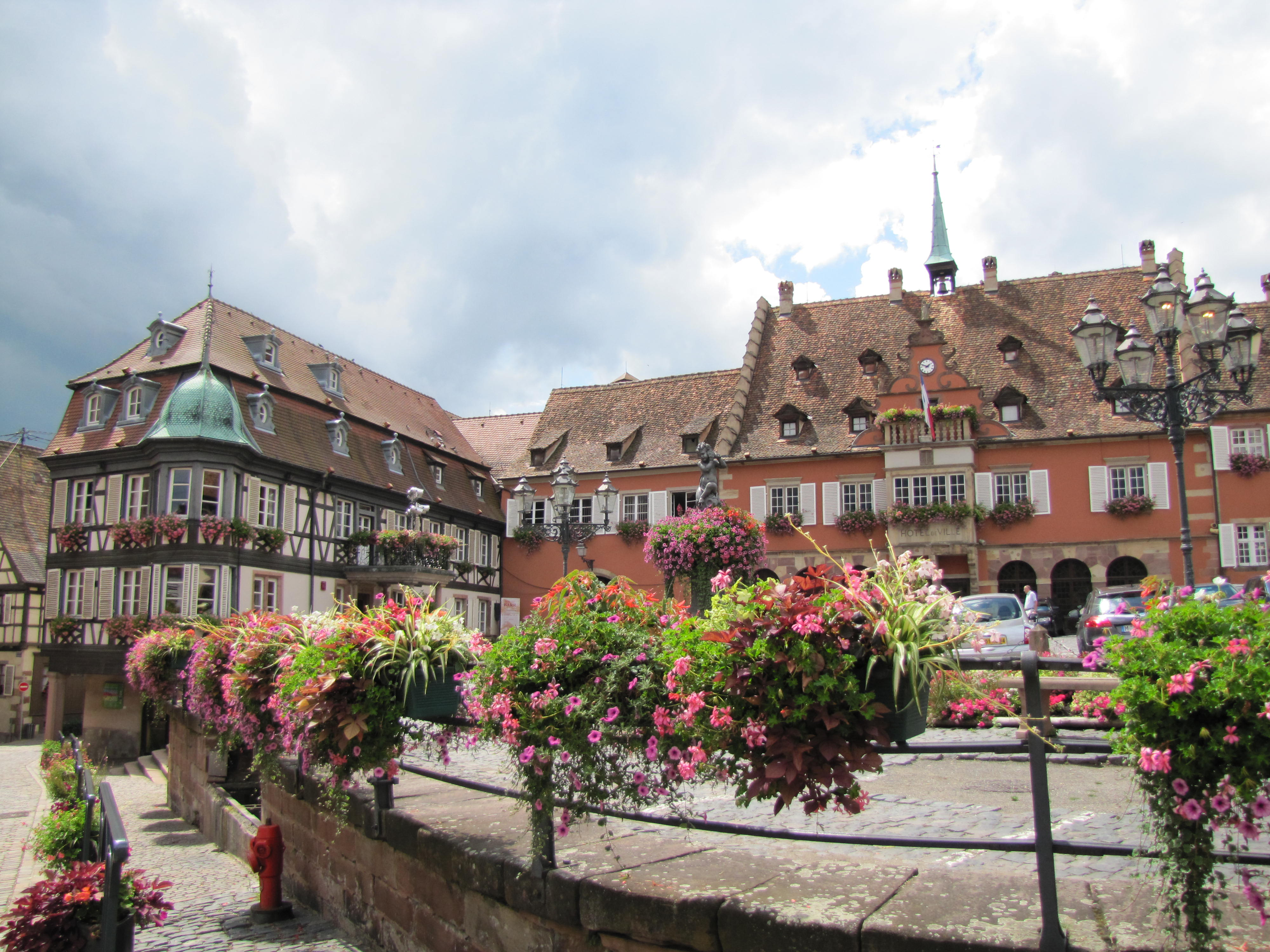
Town Hall

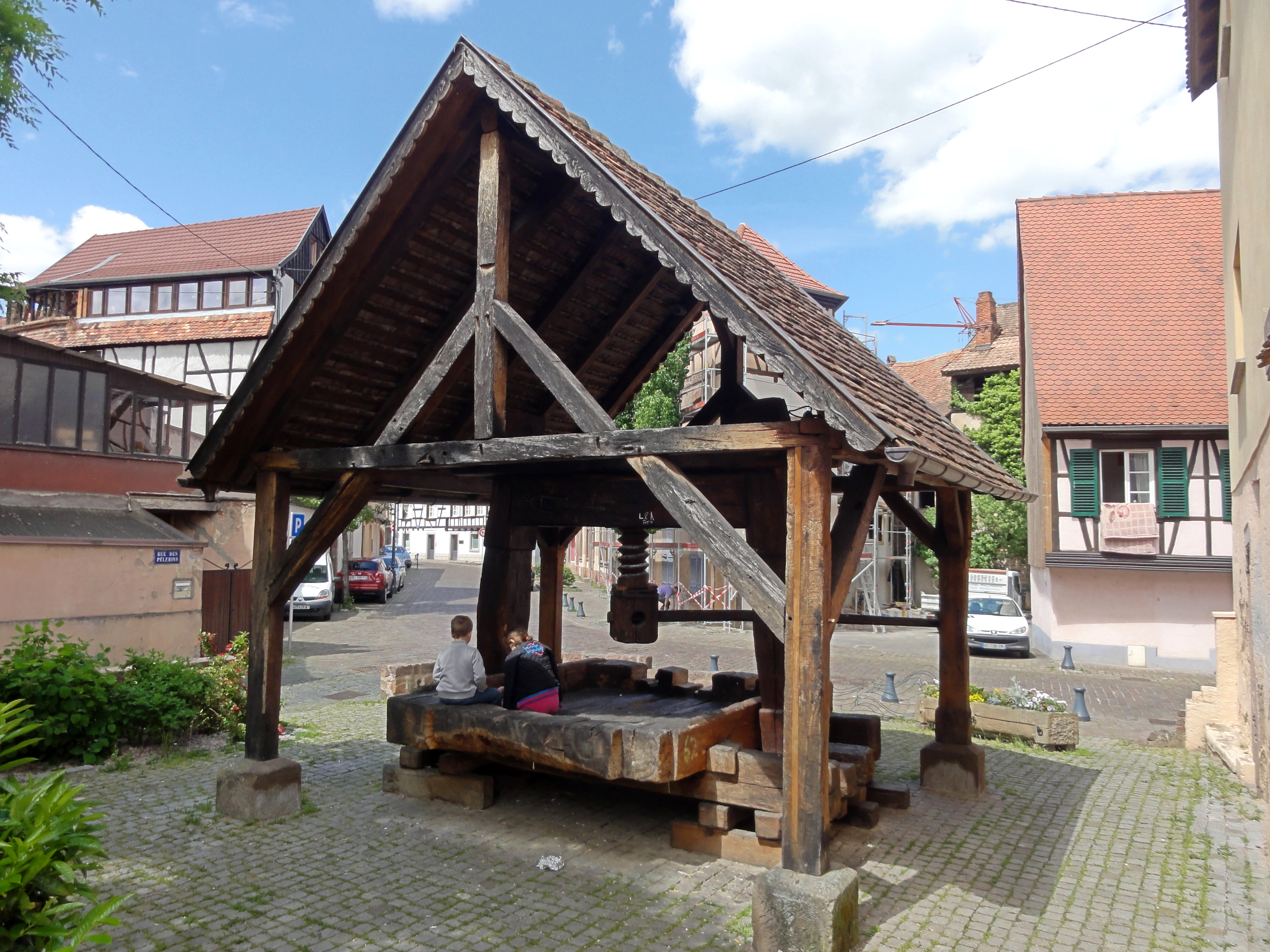
Old grape press

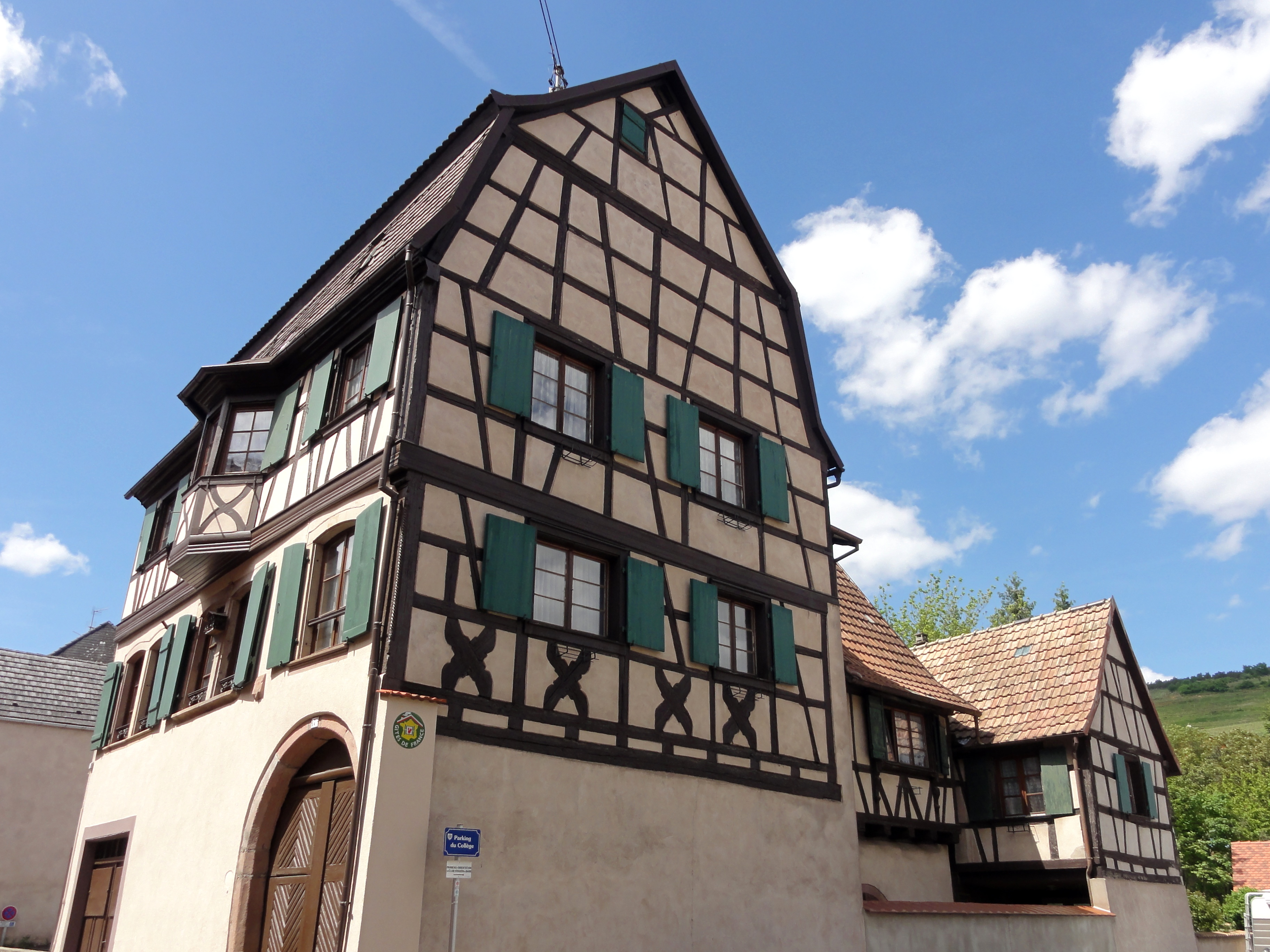
17 Rue College

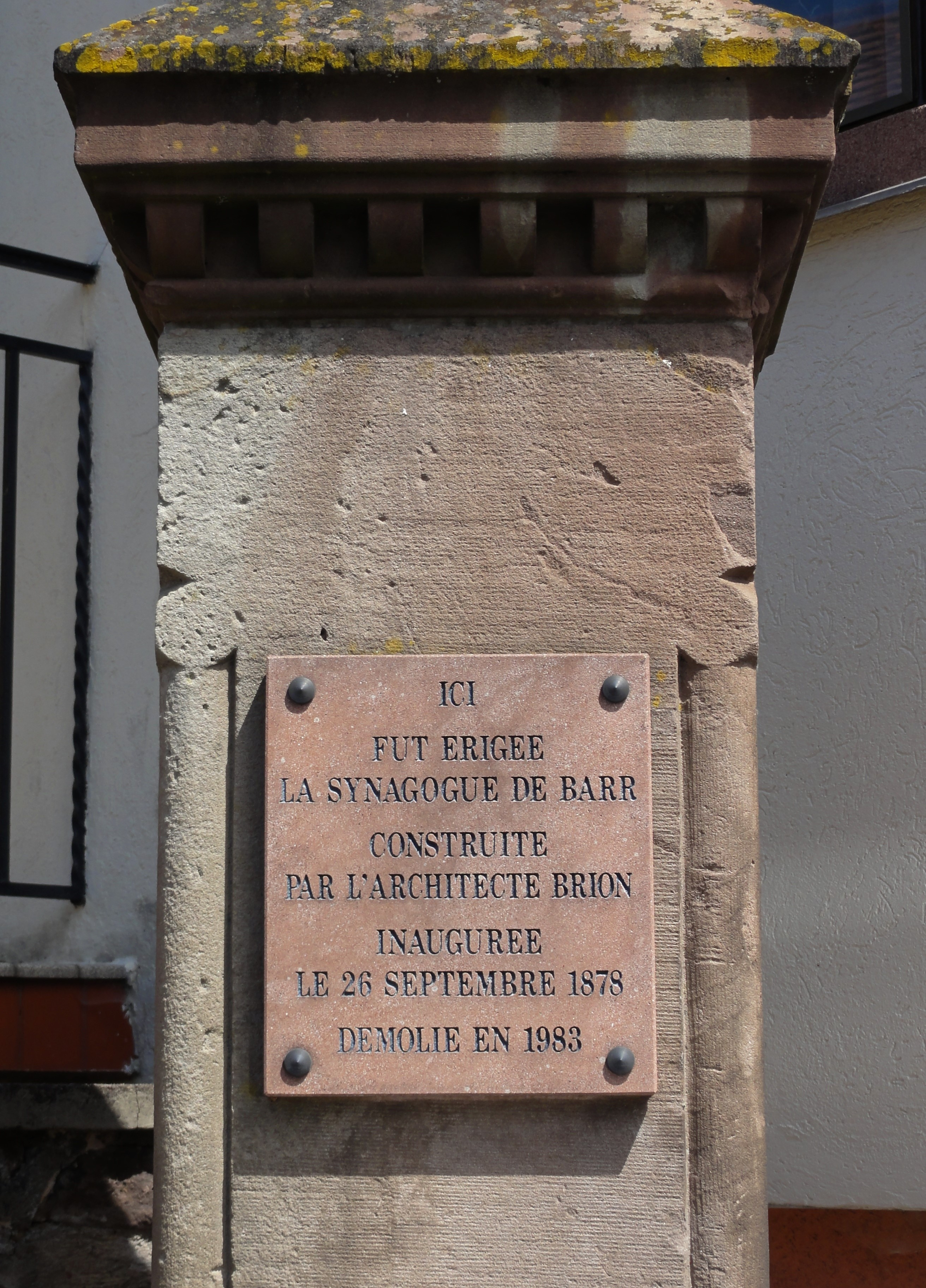
Location of the old synagogue

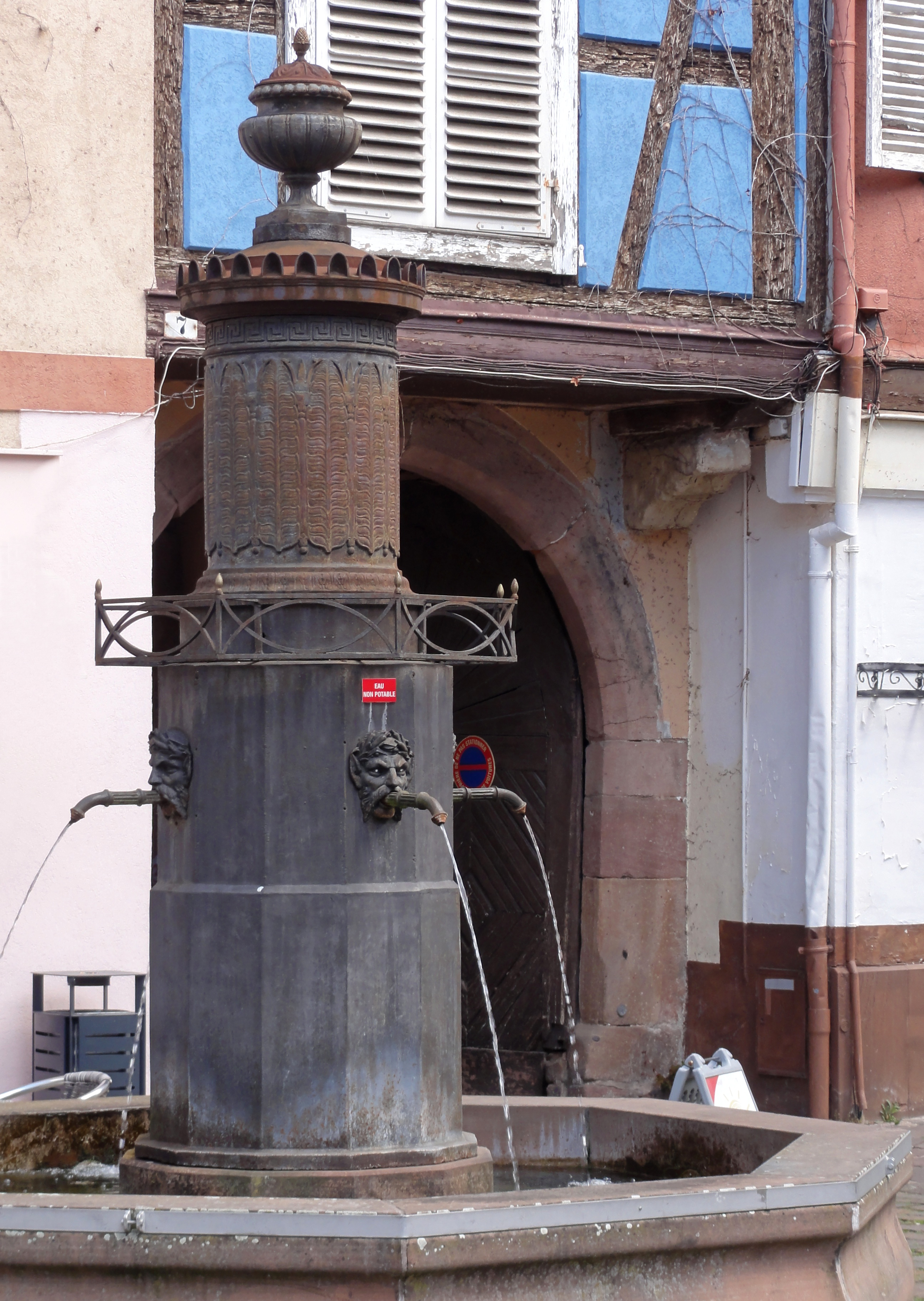
Old water pump

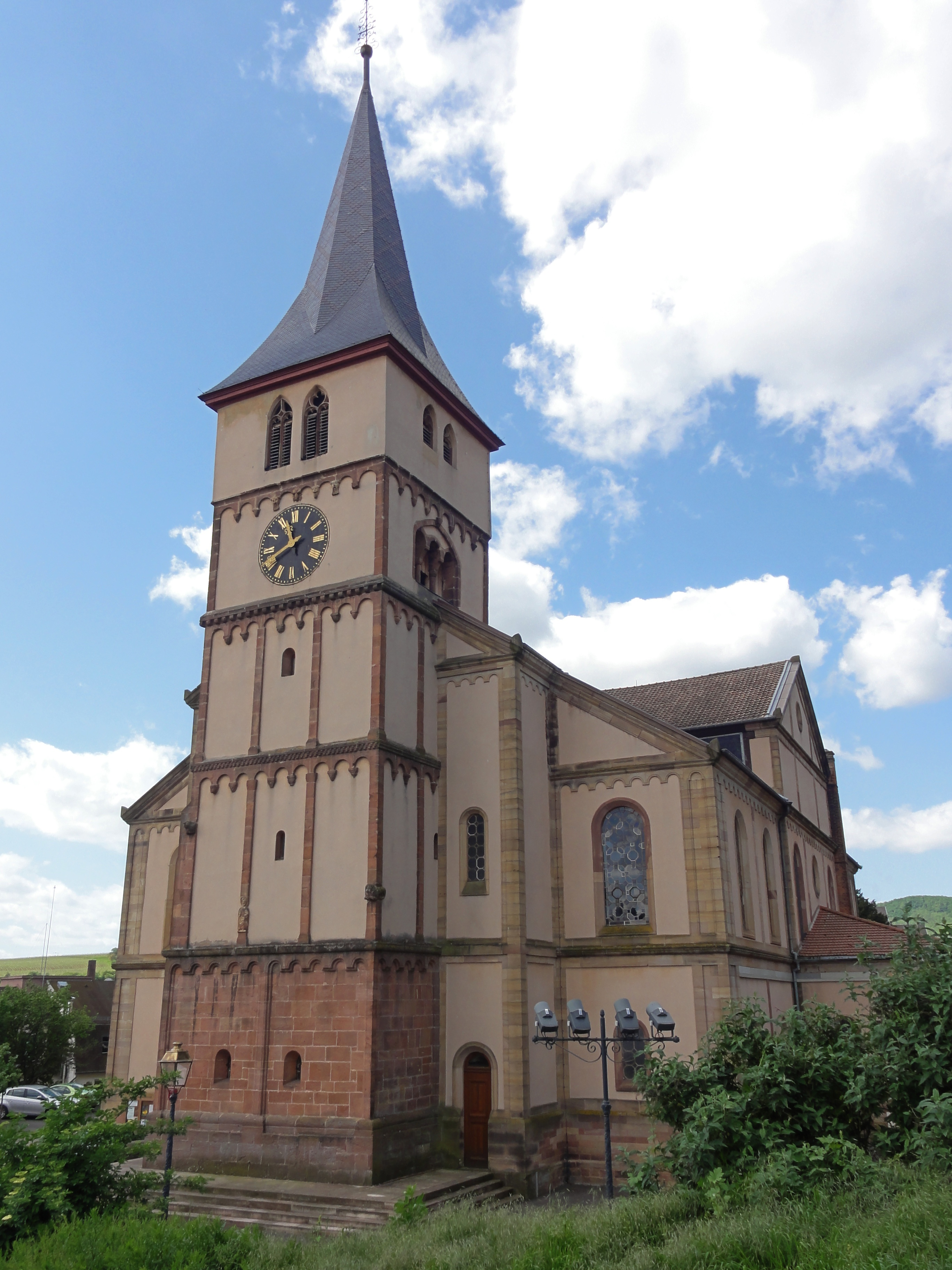
The Protestant Church

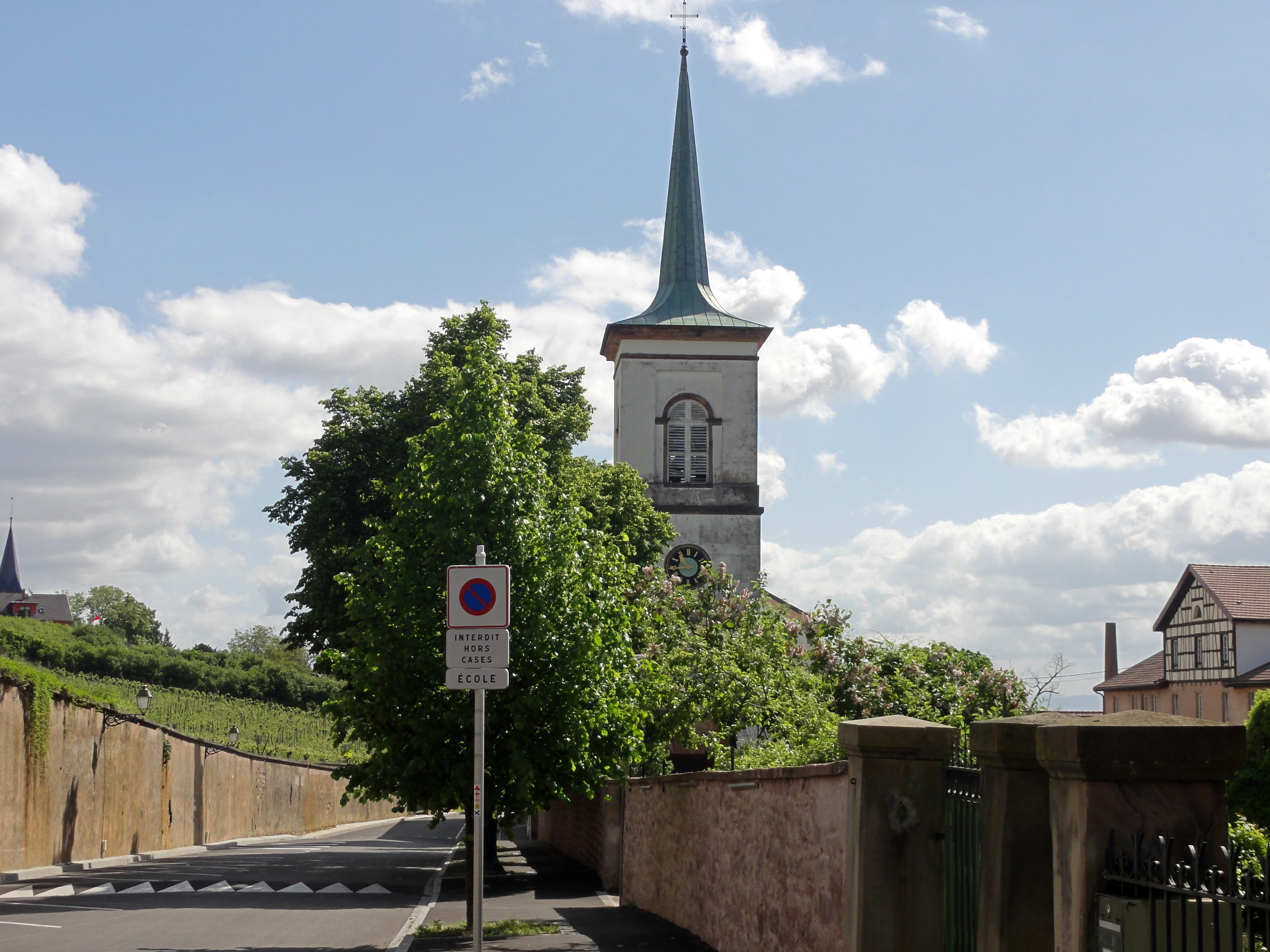
Catholic Church

=== Culture ===
- The Municipal band Union of Barr has existed since 1863.
- The film by Tony Gatlif, Je suis né d'une cigogne (1999), with Romain Duris and Rona Hartner shot some scenes with the landscape of Barr

== Notable people linked to the commune ==
- Richard Hartmann, native of Barr, locomotive manufacturer who founded a large factory in Chemnitz
- Édouard Schuré, esoteric writer
- Jean Hermann (1768–1793), doctor and naturalist whose natural history gave birth to the Musée zoologique de la ville de Strasbourg.
- Jean-Frédéric Hermann (1743-1820), brother of Jean, MP for Bas-Rhin and Mayor of Strasbourg.
- Martin von Feuerstein, artist and painter, born on 6 January 1856 in Barr and died 13 February 1931 at Munich.
- Paul Schmitthenner, German architect and University professor.
- Albert Wolff (1906–1989), French-born American Olympic fencer
- Catherine Poulain, (1960-), writer.

== See also ==
- Communes of the Bas-Rhin department

=== Bibliography ===
- "Alternative and simultaneum in the Bailiwick of Barr: a new balance between Lutherans and Catholics, 1681-1789", in Yearbook of the Society of History and Archaeology of Dambach-la-Ville, Barr, Obernai, 2013, No. 47, p. 115-130 (in French)
- Meryem Grifty, Barr, for a history of past times or The history of urban development of the barroise city, M. Grifty, Strasbourg, 1998, 100 p. (in French)
- Friedrich Hecker, Die Stadt Barr von der französischen Revolution bis auf unsere Tage, Strassburger Druckerei, 1911, 354 p. (in German)
- Anémone Koffel, "Viticulture and wine producers in Barr 1815-1939", in Historic Buildings in Alsace, 1998 No. 1, p. 153-160 (in French)
- Jean-Marie Le Minor, "Surgeons, barbers, and swimmers in Barr from the 16th to the 18th century", in Yearbook of the Society of History and Archaeology of Dambach-la-Ville, Barr, Obernai, 2004, No. 38, p. 109-136 (in French)
- Claude Muller, From lived history: a barroise chronicle of Jacques Frey (1820-1898)", in Yearbook of the Society of History and Archaeology of Dambach-la-Ville", Barr, Obernai, 2011 No. 45, p. 8-12 (in French)
- Renée Schneider, "Schools in Barr in the 20th century", in Yearbook of the Society of History and Archaeology of Dambach-la-Ville, Barr, Obernai, 2007, No. 41, p. 81-122 (in French)
- Renée Schneider, "Industry in the 19th century: the family of Moses Barr", in Yearbook of the Society of History and Archaeology of Dambach-la-Ville, Barr, Obernai, 2010, No. 44, p. 27-58 (in French)
- Renée Schneider, "From Alsace to America: the family Bartholmé Barr", in Yearbook of the Society of History and Archaeology of Dambach-la-Ville, Barr, Obernai, 2010, No. 44, p. 113-132 (in French)
- Régine Philippe Schultz and Schultz, Once upon a time ... es war einmal ... Barr: a page of Alsatian history between 1870 and 1918, Ed Alsace, Colmar, 1993, 96 p.
- Emmanuel Solère Stintzy, "Barr: the authentic, not kitsch!", in In Alsace, 2005, No. 39, p. 54-68 (in French)
