= Exils =

- Directed by: Tony Gatlif
- Written by: Tony Gatlif; Lubna Azabal
- Produced by: Tony Gatlif; Matilde Rubio
- Starring: Romain Duris
- Cinematography: Céline Bozon
- Edited by: Monique Dartonne
- Music by: Tony Gatlif; Delphine Mantoulet; Leila Makhlouf; Habib Cheik; Zouhir Gacem
- Distributed by: Home Vision Entertainment
- Release date: 25 August 2004
- Running time: 104 minutes
- Country: France
- Languages: Romani; French; Arabic; Spanish

Exils is a 2004 French film by Tony Gatlif. The film follows two young bohemians, Zano and Naima. After having sex, the two spontaneously decide that they will travel to Algeria, where Naima's parents come from, and where Zano's (Romain Duris) pied-noir parents were once exiled. Their adventurous journey to Algiers is full of character exploration, relationship hiccups and imagery. The film was also a homecoming for Gatlif himself, seeing him return to Algeria 43 years after he left.

== Plot ==
Zano and Naima travel from France, down through Spain toward Algeria but get lost many times along the way. They work as fruit pickers for a while.

== Cast and characters ==
- Romain Duris : Zano
- Lubna Azabal : Naima
- Leila Makhlouf : Leila
- Habib Cheik : Habib
- Zouhir Gacem : Said

== Awards ==
Gatlif won the award for Best Director at the 2004 Cannes Film Festival.

== Music ==
The film features original music by Tony Gatlif and vocals by Rona Hartner, who also performed in Gatlif's movie Gadjo dilo.
