= Tchavolo Schmitt =

French Romani jazz guitarist

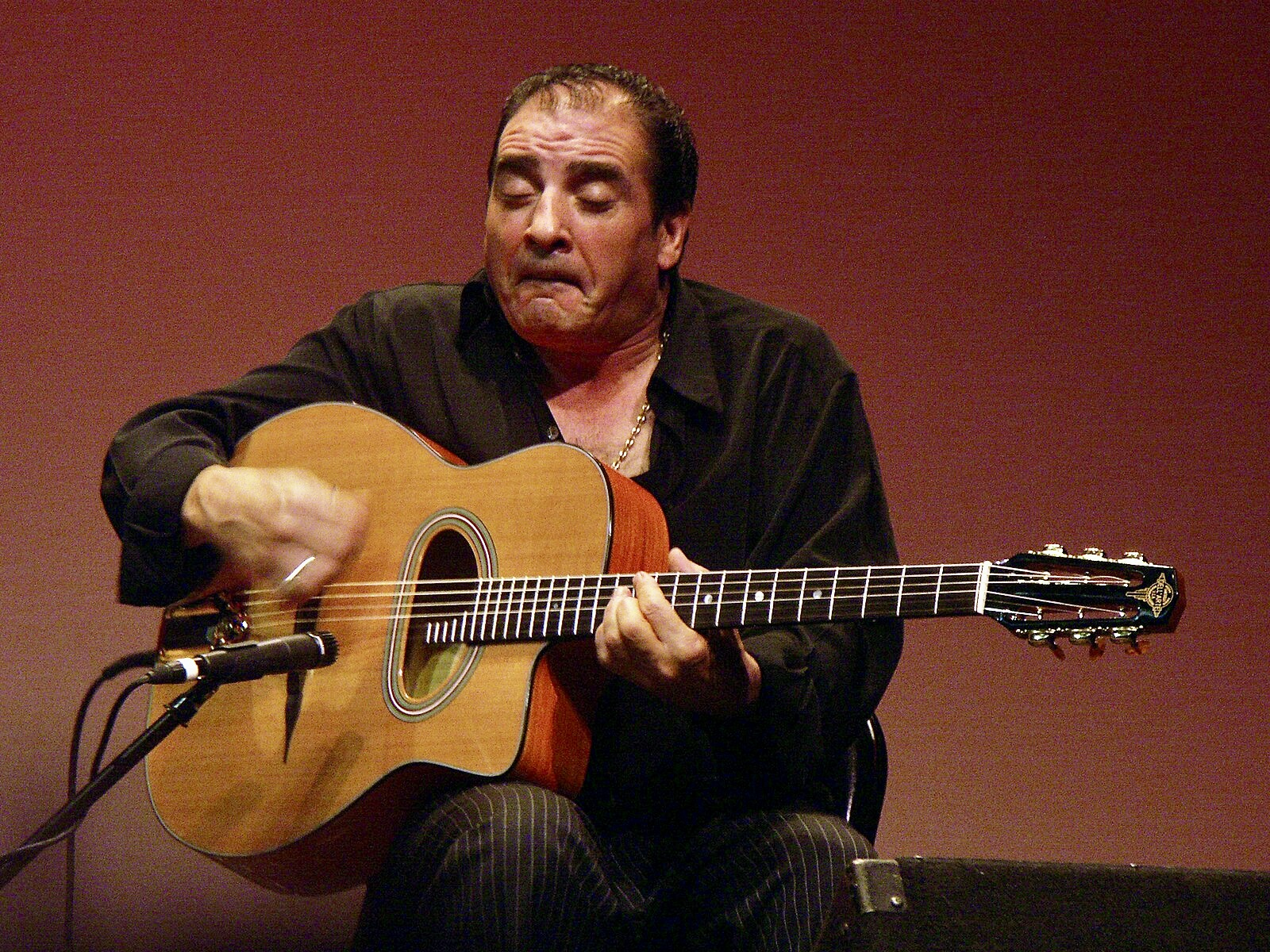
- Schmitt at Djangofest, Northwest South Whidbey High School, September 30, 2006, Langley, Whidbey Island, Washington

Background information
- Born: 1954 (age 70–71); Paris, France
- Genres: Jazz
- Occupation: Musician
- Instrument: Guitar

Tchavolo Schmitt (born 1954 in Paris) is a Romani jazz guitarist. Schmitt performed as a member of various ensembles in the 1970s. Then he settled in Strasbourg and left the professional circuit for a time, releasing solo albums in 2000. He played Miraldo in the Tony Gatlif film Swing.

== Biography ==
Tchavolo Schmitt was introduced to the guitar at the age of 6 by his mother; his father played the violin. He developed a virtuosity in the manouche style (gypsy jazz) and his renown rapidly exceeded the limits of Alsace, his ancestral region. He became influential among his peers, in particular at Porte de Montreuil or Chope des Puces in Saint-Ouen, homes of tavolo-manouche swing.

In 1979, he became a professional musician, and after leaving Paris to return to his Alsatian roots, he joined the band Hot Club da Sinti, which included violinist Wedeli Köhler, guitarist Schmeling Lehmann, and bassist Jani Lehmann. A single LP recording (now a collector's item) was released in 1981. While his career paused during the 1980s, in 1993 he joined the band Gypsy Tavolo Reunion with, among others, Dorado Schmitt, Patrick Saussois and Gino Reinhardt.

In 2000, he released the first album under his own name, titled Alors?...Voilà!. This album was followed in 2001 by Miri Familia. In 2002, he released the original soundtrack to Swing, a movie directed by Tony Gatlif where Tchavolo Schmitt played the role of Miraldo, a guitar teacher. In 2004, Angelo Debarre joined him to produce a tribute record to Django Reinhardt called Mémoires. In 2005 he released a solo album called Loutcha.

== Family ==
His cousin Dorado Schmitt is also a gypsy jazz guitarist, as are Dorado's sons Samson, Bronson and Amati.

== Discography ==
- Alors? ... Voila! (Iris Music, 2000)
- Miri Familia (Djaz, 2001)
- Memoires with Angelo Debarre (Le Chant du Monde, 2004)
- Loutcha (Le Chant du Monde, 2005)
- Seven Gypsy Nights (Le Chant du Monde, 2007)
- Live in Paris (Le Chant du Monde, 2010)
- Nouvelle Vague (Ouest, 2013)
- Melancolies D'Un Soir (Ouest, 2014)
- Miri Chterna (Mambo Productions, 2022)

== Filmography ==
- 1992 : Latcho Drom, directed by Tony Gatlif
- 2001 : Swing, directed by Tony Gatlif (DVD and VHS, Montparnasse)
