= Monique Dartonne =

- Occupations: Film editor, sound editor, director
- Years active: 1979–present

Monique Dartonne is a French film editor, sound editor and director who has worked in both French and Quebec films.

== Career ==
As a director, she made the film High Speed, which was presented at the 1986 Cannes Film Festival. There, she shared the Award of the Youth (Prix de la jeunesse) with co-director Michel Kaptur, tied with Spike Lee for She's Gotta Have It. As an editor, she is known for working with director Tony Gatlif.

In planning the 2010 film Incendies, Canadian director Denis Villeneuve met over 12 candidates to edit the film, ultimately hiring Dartonne. For Incendies, she won the Genie Award for Best Editing, as well as the Jutra Award for Editing. Being in Quebec to work on a film, Dartonne was able to attend the 31st Genie Awards and Jutra Awards ceremonies.

== Filmography ==
Her films include:

- Gadjo dilo (1997)
- Je suis né d'une cigogne (1998)
- Exils (2004)
- Transylvania (2006)
- Korkoro (2010)
- Incendies (2010)
