= Dorado Schmitt =

French guitarist and violinist

- Born: 29 May 1957 (age 67); Saint-Avold, France
- Genres: Gypsy jazz
- Occupation: Musician
- Instrument: Guitar
- Website: Official site

Dorado Schmitt (born 29 May 1957) is a French guitarist and violinist in Gypsy jazz.

== Biography ==
Schmitt was born in Saint-Avold, Lorraine, France on 29 May 1957. He started playing guitar at the age of seven with his father as his teacher. His father also introduced him to violin. Schmitt composed his own pieces, incorporating improvisation and challenging techniques, among which Bossa Dorado which has become a jazz standard. He eventually became as comfortable with swing and gypsy waltz as with bossa nova and flamenco.

He established the Dorado Trio in 1978 with Gino Reinhardt on double bass and Hono Winterstein on rhythm guitar. Later, guitarist Claudio Favari joined the group and performed at the Burghausen Jazz Festival in 1983. He recorded the albums Hommage a la Romenes and in 1984 Notre Histoire. The first remained a jazz best-seller for several weeks in Germany.

Schmitt was in a car crash in 1988, leaving him in a coma for eleven days. He spent two years in rehabilitation before he could return to the trio, which recorded Gypsy Reunion in 1993 and Parisienne in 1994. He dropped out of music again in 1997 when Gino Reinhardt died. Two years passed before he assembled another group, in which he played often with his son, Samson Schmitt, and with Christian Escoudé and Babik Reinhardt, the son of Django Reinhardt. He has also worked with Angelo Debarre, Boulou Ferré and his brother Elios Ferré, James Carter, Paquito D'Rivera, Biréli Lagrène, and a Django Reinhardt tribute band led by Brian Torff. Schmitt had a role in Latcho Drom, a documentary about gypsies for which he composed the soundtrack.

== Family ==
His cousin Tchavolo Schmitt is also a gypsy jazz guitarist, as are his sons Samson, Bronson, and Amati.

== Discography ==
=== As leader ===
- Hommage a La Romenes with Claudio Favari (Leico, 1983)
- Notre Histoire with Claudio Favari (Blue Flame, 1986)
- Parisienne (Djaz, 1995)
- Rendez-Vous with Pierre Blanchard (Le Chant du Monde, 2004)
- Dorado Sings (EMD, 2005)
- Live at the Kennedy Center (SP, 2008)
- Family (Dreyfus/Sony, 2009)
- Live with Amati Schmitt (Stunt, 2014)
- Sinti du Monde with Amati Schmitt (Stunt, 2016)
- Entre Plusieurs Couleurs (Fremeaux, 2016)
- Clair de Lune (Stunt, 2018)

=== As sideman ===
- Samson Schmitt, Djieske (EMD, 2002)
- Tchavolo Schmitt, Live in Paris (Le Chant du Monde, 2010)

== Concerts ==
- 2008: Alhambra Theatre; Sweet Georgia Brown, playing violin with Dorado Schmitt on YouTube
