= Forest Railway Welschbruch =

Coordinates: 48.415025°N 7.350090°W

Forrest Railway Welschbruch
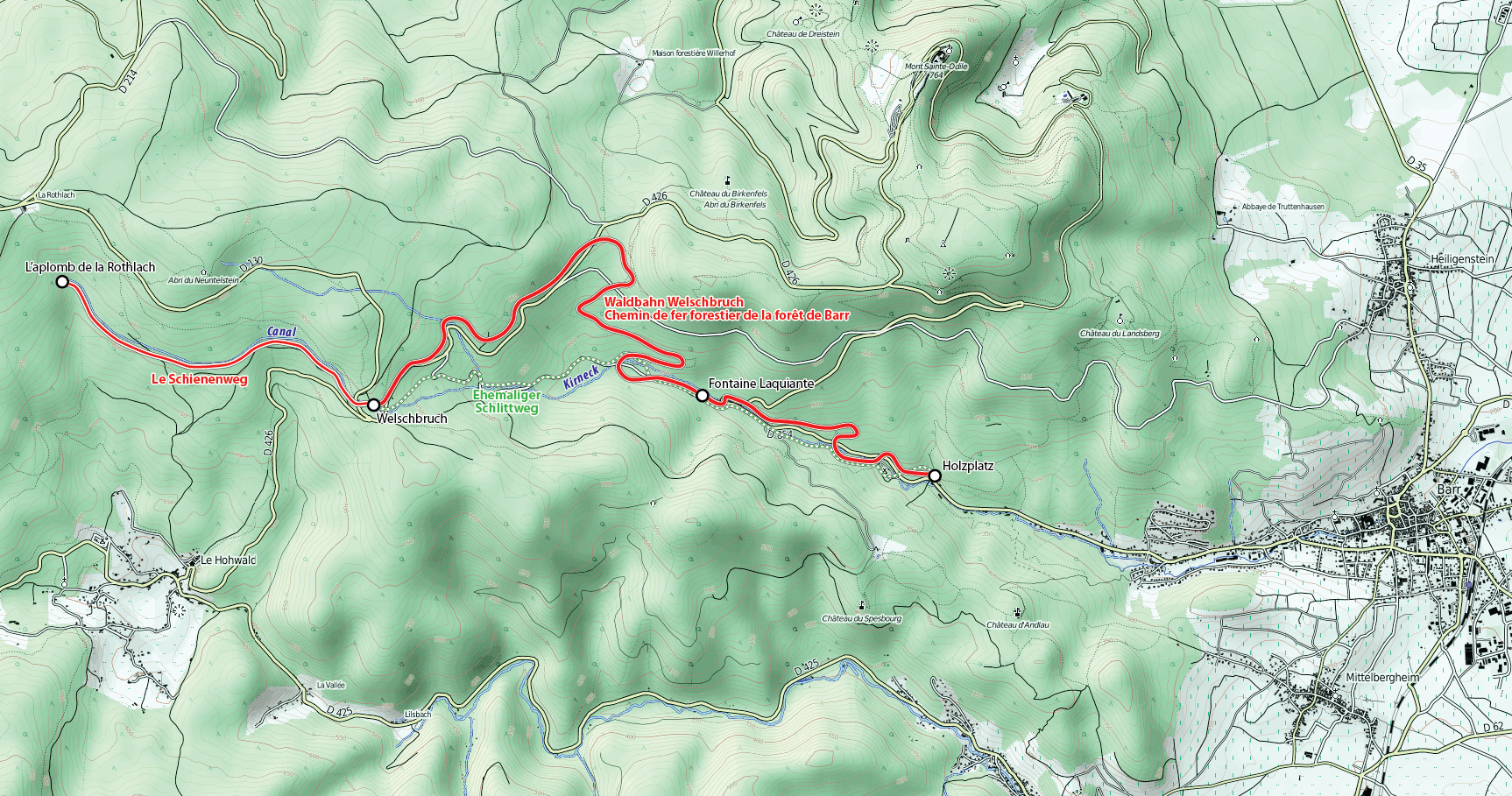
- Map of the Waldeisenbahn Welschbruch

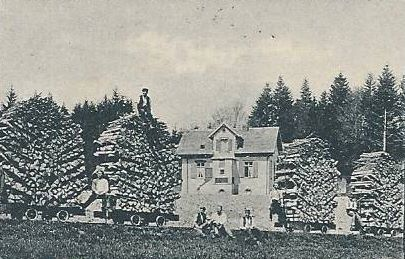
- Four trucks at the Welschbruch forester's house

Overview
- Locale: Near Barr
- Dates of operation: 1889–1906

Technical
- Length: 6.3 km (3.9 mi)

The Forest Railway Welschbruch (French: Le chemin de fer forestier de la forêt de Barr, German: Waldeisenbahn Welschbruch) was a narrow gauge forest railway near Barr in the Bas-Rhin department of France.

== Geography ==
The 6,3 km (3.9 mi) long track started at the Welschbruch forester's house and lead with an average gradient of 7% through several hairpin turns and along the river Kirneck via Fontaine Laquiante to the logging siding 445 m below. From there the logs were transported by oxcarts to the nearby railway station of Barr.

== Rolling stock ==
Initially six trucks with wooden frames were used, which could transport up to 30 m long logs or up to four cubic metres of cut logs. 1887 the number of trucks was increased to 16. Empty trucks were hauled by horses from the logging siding to the forester's house. After loading they descended by gravity within 30 min to the valley controlled by a brake operator.

== History ==
The transport of logs by sledges along the steep sledge path (Schlittweg) along the river Kirneck was dangerous and could only be done in winter. Therefore, the councils of Barr, Bourgheim, Gertwiller, Goxwiller and Heiligenstein decided to build a railway, as recommended by chief forester Rebmann, who was also the president of the Vosges-Club.

The construction of the track from the logging siding to Pfostenhiesel began in 1887. The track was extended to the forester house Welschbruch in 1888. It was connected to a section of 'le Schienenweg' over the river Rothlach. The track was officially opened on 16 July 1889 with celebrations as big as never before.

The construction costed more than 100,000 Mark, much more than the estimate of 63,000 Mark, so that its profitability was often doubtful. After only 20 years of operation, the railway was taken out of use in 1906.
