= Je suis né d'une cigogne =

- Directed by: Tony Gatlif
- Written by: Tony Gatlif
- Produced by: Tony Gatlif
- Starring: Romain Duris; Rona Hartner; Ouassini Embarek; Suzanne Flon
- Cinematography: Claude Garnier; Éric Guichard
- Edited by: Monique Dartonne
- Music by: Marc Nouyrigat
- Production company: Production Princes
- Distributed by: Mondo Films
- Release date: 24 November 1999
- Running time: 80 minutes
- Country: France
- Language: French

Je suis né d'une cigogne (English: Children of the Stork) is a 1999 French road movie directed by Tony Gatlif, starring Romain Duris, Rona Hartner, Ouassini Embarek, and Suzanne Flon. The film deals with themes like social exclusion and illegal immigration, along with references to the Romani, as in the other films by the director. Gatlif has also employed the French director Jean-Luc Godard's New Wave techniques in this film.

It was nominated for a Golden Bayard at the Festival International du Film Francophone de Namur in Namur, Belgium, but following its French release, it received mixed reviews.

== Plot ==
Two French pals, one an unemployed young man named Otto living with his mother in state housing, and the other his girlfriend Louna, who is a hairdresser and has the bailiffs after her, reflect on the lack of meaning in their lives, their society and the system. In a spirit of rebellion against everything, they hit the road and what follows is an anarchic adventure. A teenage Arab immigrant named Ali enters the story. Ali's family tries to hide its ethnic origins by going to extreme measures in switching to French customs.

The trio start wreaking havoc, robbing shops and stealing cars. On their way, they come across an injured stork with a broken wing. The stork speaks to them and says that it is an Algerian refugee, on its way to Germany to reunite with its family. The trio adopt the stork as their father, name it Mohammed, and forge a passport to enable the stork to cross the French–German border.

== Casting and characterisation ==
The film's four main characters represent the "most vulnerable sections" of society, in tune with Gatlif's earlier films portraying "social outcasts and racial minorities". Otto represents the section of unemployed youth who are neither rich nor qualified, with no hopes for a job in the future. Louna represents the underpaid who are exploited by their employers. The above characters are played by the same duo, Romain Duris and Rona Hartner, who played the leading roles in Gatlif's previous film, Gadjo dilo. The third character, the Arab immigrant, Ali (played by Ouassini Embarek), is going through an identity crisis and has run away from his family, who are trying to distance themselves from their ethnic origins by, for example, adopting French names. Ali is shown to be interested in current affairs and is also shown reading Karl Marx. The other character, the stork, represents illegal immigrants.

The film encountered production problems due to a quarrel between Rona Hartner and Gatlif which led to her walking out midway. This resulted in her abrupt disappearance from the plot in the middle until they patched up much later.

== Themes and analysis ==
The film adopts the "New Wave" technique of early films by Godard, to explore themes of border crossings and social alienation. The film deals with themes like social exclusion and illegal immigration, along with references to the Romani, as in the other films by the director.

=== Gatlif's take on the New Wave ===
The reviewer in Film de France remarked that with its themes like absurdity and nonconformity, making use of characters like a speaking stork, and also its filming techniques like jump cuts and multiple exposures, the film feels like "a blatant homage to the works of Jean-Luc Godard", and the plot "looks like a crazy mélange of Godard's À bout de souffle, Pierrot le Fou and Weekend". In the reviewer's opinion, Gatlif has overdone these techniques, leading to the film's ending up "far more substantial and worthy than a shameless appropriation of another director's technique". ACiD remarked that with his boldness and unconventional style, Gatlif has started a new New Wave trend, which would serve as a notice for both amateur filmmakers and professional film-makers. Chronic'art remarked that the film can be placed between the worse and the better among the works inspired by Godard. Though the filming techniques are similar to Godard's, the film falls short in its dealing with the unconventional themes, avoiding providing solutions, and rather ending up being a mere "passive acquiescence" reflecting on the works of revolutionaries of the era, which is far from rising up to revolt as one would expect in a Godard movie. Time Out London was also critical of Gatlif's attempts at Godard, calling it "offbeam".

=== Satirical elements ===
The film is packed with a number of references to "social issues and political theory", especially on the border crossings. Yet a reviewer for Films de France found it to be not so "heavy", thanks to the unintentional flaws in the techniques used. He observed that the film treats them using "black comedy and surrealism". The stork character is a "metaphorical stand-in" for the illegal immigrant, he added. "While birds can cross international borders at ease, human beings generally cannot": Tony Gatlif deals with this lesser freedom that human beings possess with his "well intended irony", using the stork. On forging the passports for the stork and the need for 'papers' while crossing borders, Gatlif said mockingly in an interview that "in France there are 1.5 million birds and 1.5 million foreigners. The difference is that the bird is free, because he has no ID. He flies to Africa, to the wealthy countries and to developing countries. It makes no difference to him. He is an alien everywhere". ACiD called this "poetic" while Time Out London found it "woolly and unilluminating". The word cigogne is pronounced very similarly to tsigane which is one of the words used for Romani people. There are also a number of "in-jokes and references to French cinema" which a viewer might miss in the first viewing, observed Films de France, citing scenes such as one which is a parody on an awards ceremony and one of an austere reviewer "rubber stamping films with trite stock phrases". Chronic'art found these scenes heavy because of the limitations of a work in which the director "at his pleasure distills his personal tastes".

=== Political alienation ===
The film's references to revolutionaries like Karl Marx, Che Guevara and Guy Debord coupled with Godard's techniques give it a 1970s feel, observed a reviewer for Télérama. Though it re-lives the avant-garde of the past, it is a bit retro for the current times, which bores its viewers, he added. Les Inrockuptibles also found the theme "dated", adding that it could very well have been a documentary by some non-profit organisation like GISTI. Chronic'art remarked that mere quoting of Marx or Che Guevera would not make the film, with its rather common theme of socially disillusioned, unemployed youth in revolt, achieve anything. It also called the depictions of idiotic CRS personnel and militant NF activists clichéd.

== Release ==
The film was screened at the 1999 Festival International du Film Francophone de Namur in Namur, Belgium, competing against films from Québec, France, Vietnam, Belgium, Sénégal, and Egypt for the Golden Bayard award in the Best Film category, which was won by Christine Carrière's Nur der Mond schaut zu. The film received rave reviews for its rare courage in presenting disconcerting themes such as unemployment and illegal immigration. In 2000, it was screened at the International Film Festival Rotterdam in the official section and received praise for its unconventional elements, such as the talking stork.

The Festival Internacional de Cine de Río de Janeiro screened the film in the non-competitive Panorama du cinéma mondial section, along with 27 other films from around the world. In 2008, the film was screened at L'Alternativa, Festival de Cine Independiente de Barcelona in the parallels section, La pasión gitana, along with a selection of other films directed by Tony Gatlif with Romani themes.

== Reception ==
=== Critical reception ===
Time Out London called it "far more fanciful and pretentious" than Gatlif's earlier films, and also regarded Gatlif's treatment of Godard as a failure. ACiD gave it a positive review, lauding Gatlif's bold depiction of absurdity. Romain Duris and Rona Hartner's performance was described as "beautiful" and as complemented by Ouassini Embarek's, which was described as "brilliant". In summary, the reviewer suggested the film be called "The Good, the Bad and the Ugly", citing the mixed topics dealt with, and added that it takes the viewers "beyond the real, beyond the borders and everything one can imagine".

A review by James Travers for Films de France called it the "most unconventional" of all road movies, with its "insanely anarchic portrait of adolescent rebellion", adding that it is an "ingenious parable of social exclusion and immigration in an uncaring society". Travers also wrote that the film's editing and narrative techniques turn into a plus, making it "refreshingly fresh and original", adding that the "patchwork narrative style" suits the rebellious nature of the characters very well. Owing to the unconventionality of the film, Louna's disappearance from the plot in the middle does not look very obvious, he added. Les Inrockuptibles called it a "tragicomic fable on the notions of borders and free movement of people" and added that the film's use of comedy and disjunctive narrative style is only partially successful. Though not conventionally beautiful, the film impresses the viewers with its "energy, boldness and humor in places when it doesn't leave them stranded", the reviewer concluded.
