= Swing (2002 film) =

2002 French film by Tony Gatlif

- Directed by: Tony Gatlif
- Screenplay by: Tony Gatlif
- Release date: 2002
- Country: France

Swing is a French film by Tony Gatlif, released in 2002.

== Synopsis ==
In a suburb of Strasbourg, Alsace, France, ten-year-old boy, Max, spends his summer vacation with his grandmother. He hears Manouche gypsy Romani music being played in a local bar, and loves it. He goes to visit the gypsies in search of a guitar, where he meets a young Romani tomboy, 'Swing'. She introduces Max to her gypsy community who live in caravans and down-at-heel public housing. Over several days, Max is taken into the community to witness Romani lifestyle, traditions, knowledge of plants, and particularly their Manouche music. Max is particularly fascinated by Miraldo, the Romani guitarist he first heard in the bar, and asks to take guitar lessons with him (Miraldo is played by one of the greatest guitarists of gypsy jazz, Tchavolo Schmitt).

Max and Swing develop a close bond, set to many strong and catchy musical moments (some featuring the music of Django Reinhardt). Max hears from a chainsmoking grandmother (played by Helene Mershtein) how she and one other child were the sole survivors of a group or Romani interred and shot during the Second World War. The mixed Algerian/Romany heritage of the Director is given homage by featuring a musical jam session with Miraldo and Khalid, played by Abdellatif Chaarani.

The film comes to a climax as Max finally learns to play a gypsy tune during his lesson, but just as we surmise Miraldo has succeeded in teaching him, he suffers a heart attack outside his caravan and dies. Following Romany tradition, Miraldo's caravan and personal effects are burned. Max's holiday comes to an end, and Max and Swing part company with sadness. The implication is that Max's Gadjo status (a Romani term designating those who are not of that ethnic group) is a gulf between them.

== Details ==
- Title: Swing
- Director: Tony Gatlif
- Screenplay: Tony Gatlif
- Cinematography: Claude Garnier
- Original Music: Mandino Reinhardt, Tchavolo Schmitt, Abdellatif Chaarani, Tony Gatlif
- Release date: 20 March 2002
- French and Romany with English subtitles
- Genre: Dramatic comedy
- Duration: 87 min.

== Cast ==
- Oscar Copp: Max
- Lou Rech: Swing
- Tchavolo Schmitt: Miraldo
- Mandino Reinhardt: Mandino
- Abdellatif Chaarani: Khalid
- Fabienne Mai: Max's grandmother
- Ben Zimet: Doctor Liberman
- Colette Lepage: Miraldo's wife
- Marie Genin: Max's mother
- Helene Mershtein: the grandmother

== Critical appreciation ==
In director Tony Gatlif's own words, "Music is the liberty that inspires me when I make my films, and gives me the energy to go out and meet people throughout the world. The film could not be made without music." "Swing is undeniably loose, a drawback in a thriller, probably, but an advantage for a film that tries to capture a fleeting moment as delicate as light on a pond," remarked Rick McGinnis, who gave the film four stars.
