= Rona Hartner =

Romanian actress, painter and singer (1973–2023)

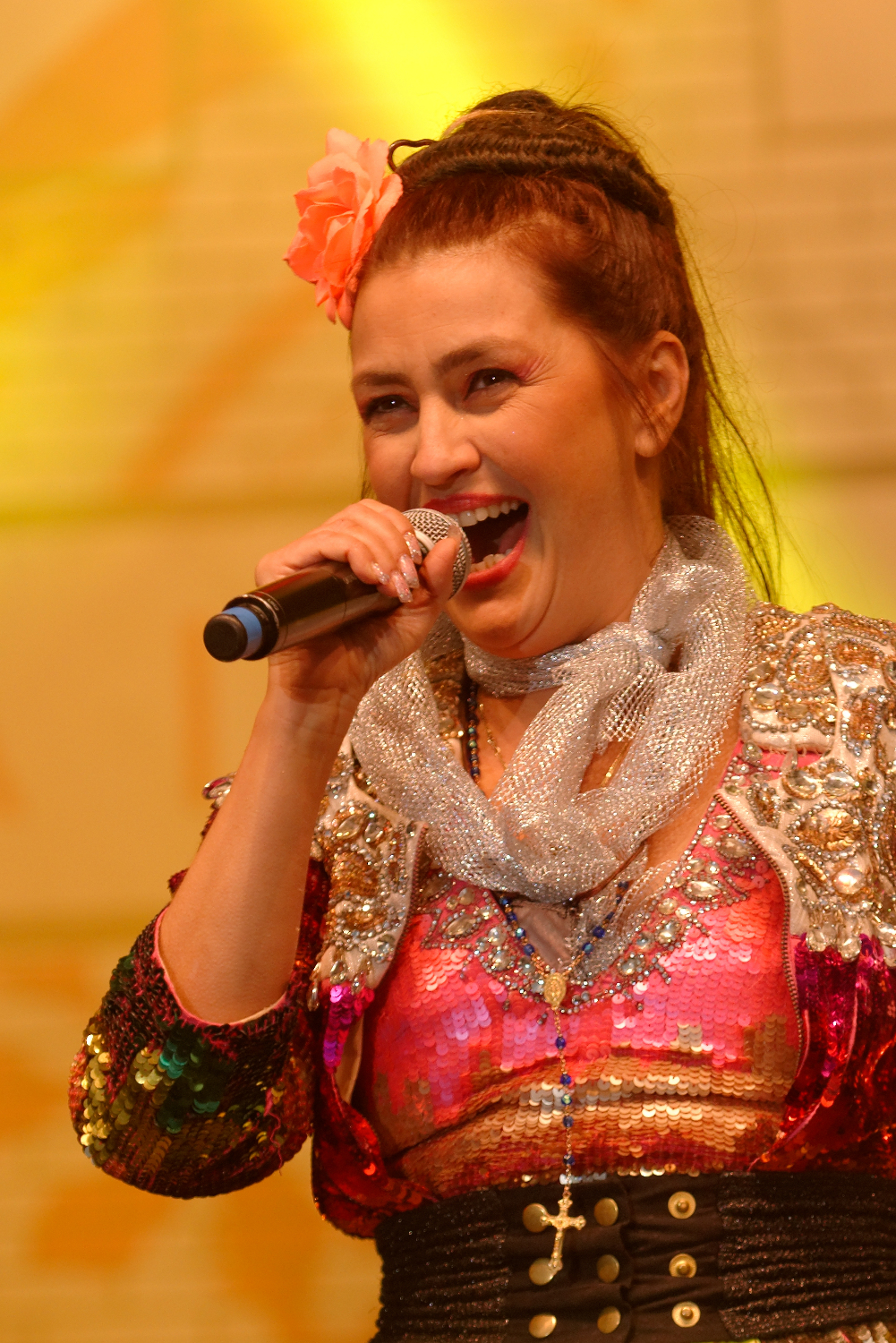
Hartner in 2013

Rona Hartner (9 March 1973 – 23 November 2023) was a French-Romanian actress, painter and singer who was born in Bucharest. She was of German descent. As an actress, she was best known for her role in Tony Gatlif's film Gadjo dilo. Hartner focused on her music career, specializing in Gypsy music. She died of lung and brain cancer in Toulon on 23 November 2023, at the age of 50. She had lived in France for over two decades at the time of her death.

== Filmography ==
- 1994: Trancers 4: Jack of Swords by David Nutter
- 1994: Trancers 5: Sudden Deth by David Nutter
- 1996: Asphalt Tango by Nae Caranfil
- 1997: Gadjo dilo by Tony Gatlif
- 1999: Children of the Stork by Tony Gatlif
- 2000: Sauve-moi by Christian Vincent
- 2003: Time of the Wolf by Michael Haneke
- 2003: Le Divorce by James Ivory
- 2003: Maria by Călin Peter Netzer
- 2011: Chicken with Plums by Marjane Satrapi
- 2021: A la rencontre de l'âme roumaine by Geoffroy de La Tullaye
