= The Crazy Stranger =

1997 French-Romanian film

- Film poster
- Directed by: Tony Gatlif; Mihai Iacob
- Written by: Tony Gatlif; Jacques Maigre; Kits Hilaire; Mihai Iacob
- Produced by: Doru Mitran
- Starring: Romain Duris; Rona Hartner; Izidor Serban; Ovidiu Balan
- Cinematography: Eric Guichard
- Edited by: Monique Dartonne
- Music by: Tony Gatlif
- Production companies: CNC; Princess Films; Canal+
- Distributed by: AFMD
- Release dates: August 1997 (MWFF); 8 April 1998 (France)
- Running time: 102 minutes
- Countries: Romania; France
- Languages: Romani; Romanian; French
- Box office: $673,153 (US)

The Crazy Stranger (original title: Gadjo dilo – Romanes for "Crazy Gadjo") is a 1997 French-Romanian film directed and written by Tony Gatlif & Mihai Iacob. Most of the film was shot at the village of Crețulești, some kilometers from Bucharest, and some of the actors are local Romani people.

== Plot ==
Stéphane, a young French man from Paris, travels to Romania. He is looking for the singer Nora Luca, whom his father had heard all the time before his death. Wandering along a frozen road, he meets old Izidor, a Rom and tries to tell him of Nora Luca. Drunken Izidor only hears the handful of Romani words and takes Stéphane to his village, determined to teach the boy the Romani language. Stéphane believes that Izidor will take him to Nora Luca when the time has come, so he lives in the Roma village for several months in Izidor's house, as Izidor's son Adriani has been arrested. Izidor is happy to have him as a guest, calling him "his Frenchman" and fixing the young wanderer's worn-out shoes. The other Roma dislike Stéphane at first, insulting him in their language and believing him to be a lunatic, tricking him into saying rude words and even into entering a tent where women are bathing. Stéphane gradually wins them over by showing his respect for their music and culture and is rewarded with an intimate look into every aspect of Roma life, from a raucous wedding to a bittersweet funeral. The only person in the village who speaks any French is the young Sabina, a divorced Romani dancer who is blatantly hostile towards him at first, but the pair eventually bond through a series of trips across the countryside to record traditional Romani music.

One day, just as the pair are beginning to make love for the first time, Adriani returns after many months in jail. The village rejoices, but the men soon have to leave to work at a performance and the two lovebirds sneak off to be together. While they are away, Adriani goes to the local bar, where he murders a man that he accuses of being responsible for his imprisonment. Adriani escapes, but a mob follows him and burns the village to the ground, killing him. Stéphane and Sabina return to find the smoldering ruins and are both devastated. They hurry to the concert venue and tell Izidor, who races outside and begs the earth to open and reunite him with his son.

Stéphane leaves the village and drives to the mile marker where the film opened. Grief-stricken, he smashes all the tapes he recorded during his travels with Sabina on the stone marker and buries them. He then drinks from a vodka bottle, spills some on the "grave" of the tapes, lays the bottle of the "grave" and then dances as Izidor did at his brother's funeral. A shot of the back of the car reveals Sabina sleeping in the back seat. She wakes up, notices the impromptu "funeral" that Stéphane is holding and smiles before the screen fades to black.

== Cast ==
- Romain Duris as Stéphane
- Rona Hartner as Sabina
- Izidor Serban as Izidor
- Ovidiu Balan as Sami
- Naomy as Adriani
- Adrian Simionescu as the child prodigy
- Angela Serban as Angela
- Mónika Juhász Miczura provides the voice of Nora Luca (unseen in the film)

== Themes ==
Prejudice and racism is a major theme in The Crazy Stranger. The Romani people, so often accused of numerous crimes and demonized by outsiders, are shown as predominantly positive, yet wronged figures. They at first fear Stéphane, accusing him much in the way they themselves are accused by the local non-Roma, fearing he will steal from them or kidnap the children (both are racist stereotypes falsely associated with Romani people). Initially, their fears seem absurd, yet it becomes clear that these are the very prejudices that Romani people must endure every day.

Music plays another major role in the film, echoing Gatlif's magnum opus, Latcho Drom. Stéphane cannot communicate with the Roma without help and vice versa, but his passion for their music helps the lack of communication and aids in healing their prejudices.

== Accolades ==
- Locarno International Film Festival in 1997: Silver Leopard for best movie, bronze Leopard and special prize to Rona Hartner
- Nominated for César Award for Most Promising Actor (Romain Duris) and César Award for Most Promising Actress (Rona Hartner) and won César Award for Best Original Music at the 24th César Awards in 1999
- In Thessaloniki, Greece, the film, translated in Greek as Gadjo Dilo: There still are smiling Gypsies won a prize in the 41st Thessaloniki Film Festival in 1998.
- Tromsø International Film Festival – Audience Award

== Connections ==
In 2006, Gatlif directed Transylvania. This time it is an Italian woman who travels from France to Romanian Transylvania to find her lover, a Romani musician.
