= Latcho Drom =

- Directed by: Tony Gatlif
- Written by: Tony Gatlif
- Produced by: Michèle Ray-Gavras
- Cinematography: Eric Guichard
- Edited by: Nicole Berckmans
- Release date: 21 May 1993
- Running time: 103 minutes
- Country: France
- Language: French

Latcho Drom ("safe journey") is a 1993 French film directed and written by Tony Gatlif. The movie is about the Romani people's journey from north-west India to Spain, consisting primarily of music. The film was screened in the Un Certain Regard section at the 1993 Cannes Film Festival.

== Plot ==
The film contains very little dialogue and captions; only what is required to grasp the essential meaning of a song or conversation is translated. The film begins in the Thar Desert in Northern India and ends in Spain, passing through Egypt, Turkey, Romania, Hungary, Slovakia, and France. All of the Romani portrayed are actual members of the Romani community.

- India—Kalbelia people gather in celebration.
- Egypt—Ghawazi people sing and dance while children observe and begin to learn the artistic traditions.
- Turkey—Turkish Roma in Istanbul sell flowers and play their music in cafes while their children observe and learn.
- Romania—A young Roma boy listens to Roma musicians sing about the horrors of Nicolae Ceausescu and his reign before returning to his village, where the musicians from earlier begin a semi-spontaneous and joyous music session.
- Hungary—A Roma family on the train sing of their rejection by non-Romani people. The scene cuts to the train station ahead, where the waiting family set up a fire as they wait across the tracks from the train station while a Hungarian woman and her young son wait on a bench. The boy, seeing that his mother is sad and cold, ventures over to the Roma, who strike up the music and cheer the woman up before their family on the train arrive and they walk away singing.
- Slovakia—The train screeches along a barbed wire fence as an old woman sings a song about Auschwitz and the camera pans down to reveal her imprisonment tattoo from her time in the concentration camp. A series of shots show a winter camp before the occupants return to the road.
- France—French Romani set up camp with their metal vardos in a summer field and briefly go about their business, making baskets and other crafts before being driven off by landlords. They leave behind clues that a fellow Romani musician Tchavolo Schmitt uses to find them. They all meet up for the celebration in Saintes-Maries-de-la-Mer and celebrate the festival of Saint Sarah, patron saint of the Romani.
- Spain—Latcho Drom closes in Spain, showing flamenco puro performed by local "Gitanos". The famous "gitana" singer La Caita sings mournfully of the centuries of persecution, repeatedly imploring "Why do you spit in my face?" as her query echoes out over the town.

== Music ==
The use of music in the film is highly important. Although Latcho Drom is a documentary, there are no interviews and none of the dialogue is captioned. Few of the lyrics are captioned. The film relies on music to convey emotion and tell the story of the Romani. Musicians include the Romanian group Taraf de Haïdouks, La Caita (Spain), Remedios Amaya and gypsy jazz guitarist Tchavolo Schmitt.

The soundtrack was composed by Dorado Schmitt, who appears in the film.

== Reception ==
On review aggregator website Rotten Tomatoes, the film holds an approval rating of 86% based on 7 reviews, with an average rating of 7.4/10.
