= Tony Gatlif =

French film director (1948–2026)

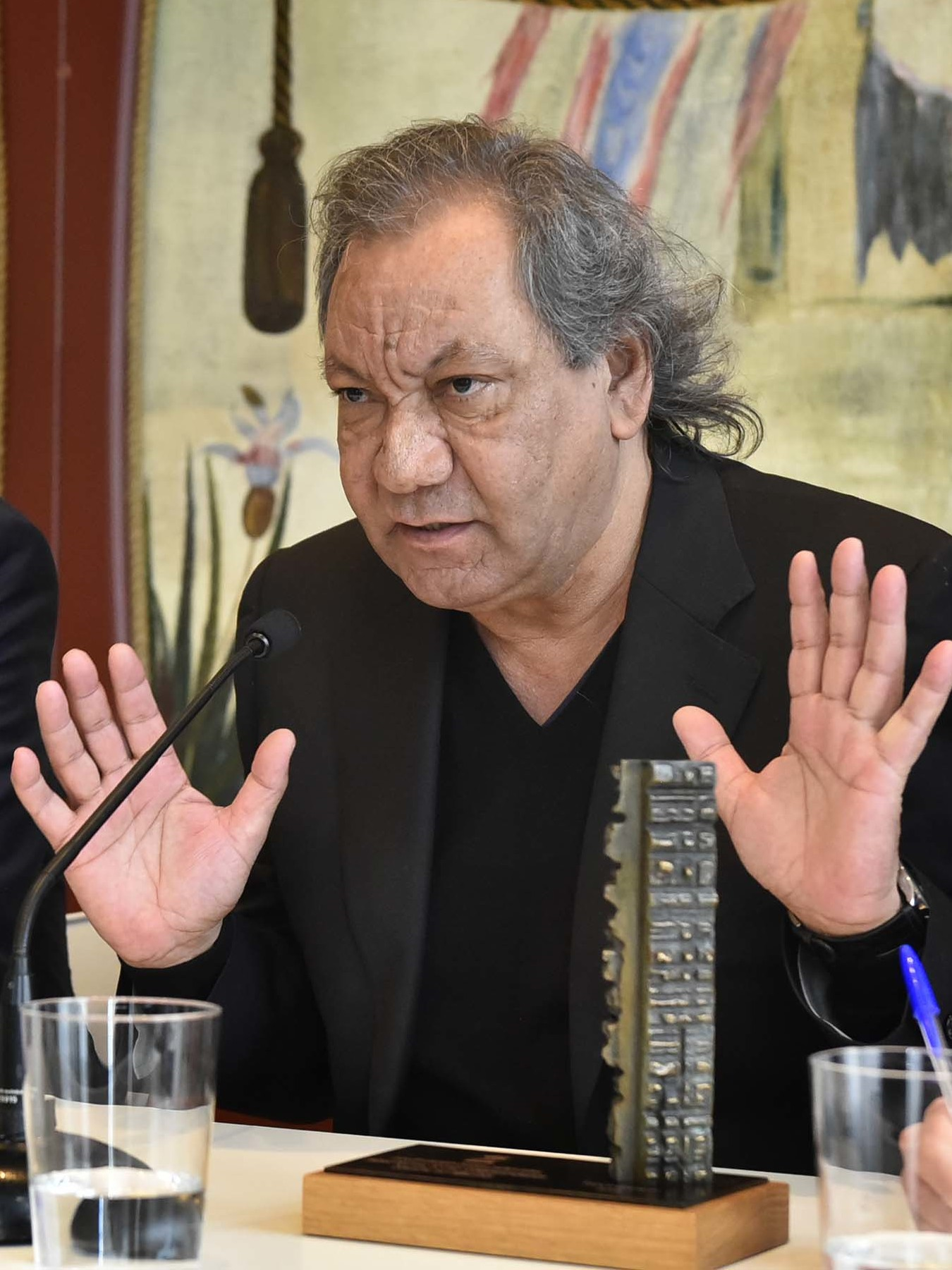
- Tony Gatlif in 2016
- Born: Michel Dahmani; 10 September 1948; Algiers, French Algeria
- Died: 2 September 2026 (aged 77); Arles, France
- Occupations: Film director, producer, screenwriter, actor, composer

Tony Gatlif (born Michel Dahmani; 10 September 1948 – 2 September 2026) was a French film director who also worked as a screenwriter, composer, actor and film producer.

== Early life ==
Born as Michel (Boualem) Dahmani on 10 September 1948 in Algeria, then officially part of France, to a Berber (Kabyle) father and an Andalusian-Romani mother, Gatlif's cultural background is fairly complex. He was of pied noir ancestry. After his childhood there, Gatlif arrived in France in 1960 following the Algerian War of Independence.

== Career ==
Gatlif struggled for years to break into the film industry, playing in several theatrical productions until directing his first film, La Tête en ruine, in 1975. He followed it with the 1979 La Terre au ventre, a story of the Algerian War of Independence.

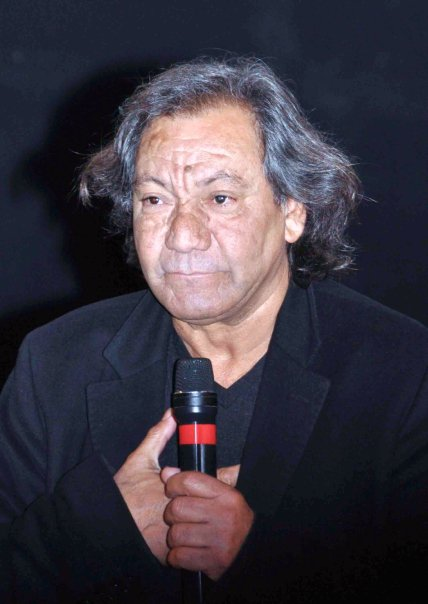
Tony Gatlif in 2010

Since the 1981 film Corre, gitano, Gatlif's work focused on the Romani people of Europe, from whom he partially traces his descent.

After making Gaspard et Robinson in 1990, Gatlif spent 1992 and 1993 shooting Latcho Drom, which was awarded numerous prizes. This feature-length musical film, often mislabelled as a documentary, deals with Romani culture throughout the world around the theme of their music and dance. For Vincent Ostria, then journalist at the Cahiers du Cinéma, it was "the most genuine film of the year (1993 editor's note)." A year later, Gatlif brought the world of the author J. M. G. Le Clézio to the screen in Mondo (1994).

His 2004 film Exils won the Best Director Award at the 2004 Cannes Film Festival. His film Transylvania also premiered at Cannes in May 2006. He was awarded the 'Itinérances' prize in 2022 by the Alès Film Festival – Itinérances.

== Death ==
Gatlif died in Arles, South of France, on 2 September 2026, at the age of 77.

== Filmography ==
=== Screenwriter ===
- La Rage au poing (1975)

=== Director and screenwriter ===
- La Tête en ruine (1975)
- La Terre au ventre (1978)
- Corre gitano (1981)
- Canta gitano (1981)
- Les Princes (1982)
- Rue du départ (1985)
- Pleure pas my love (1989)
- Gaspard et Robinson (1990)
- Latcho Drom (1993)
- Mondo (1995)
- Gadjo dilo (1997)
- Je suis né d'une cigogne (1998)
- Vengo (2000)
- Swing (2002)
- Exils (2004)
- Transylvania (2006)
- Korkoro (2009)
- Indignados (2012)
- Geronimo (2014)
- Djam (2017)
- Tom Medina (2021)
- Ange (2025)
