= Costa-Gavras filmography =

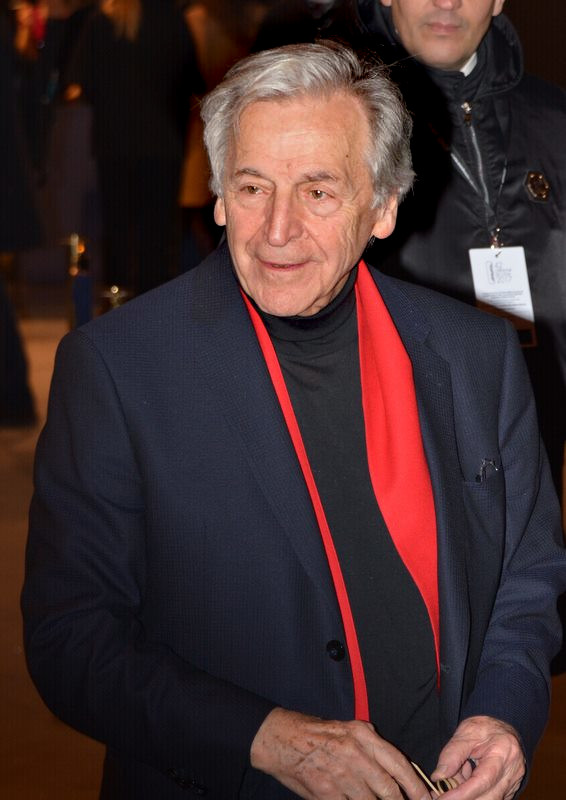
Costa-Gavras at the 2017 César Awards

Costa-Gavras is a Greek-French film director, screenwriter and producer. Most of Gavras' films have been made in French; however, six of them were made in the English language.

== Films ==
Year	English title	Director	Writer	Producer	Original title
1965	The Sleeping Car Murders	Yes	Yes	No	Compartiment tueurs
1967	Shock Troops	Yes	Yes	Yes	Un homme de trop
1969	Z	Yes	Yes	No	Z
1970	The Confession	Yes	No	No	L'Aveu
1972	State of Siege	Yes	Yes	No	État de siège
1975	Special Section	Yes	Yes	Yes	Section spéciale
1979	Womanlight	Yes	Yes	No	Clair de femme
1982	Missing	Yes	Yes	No	missing.
1983	Hanna K.	Yes	Yes	No	Hanna K.
1986	Family Business	Yes	Yes	No	Conseil de famille
1988	Betrayed	Yes	No	No	Betrayed
1989	Music Box	Yes	No	No	Music Box
1993	The Little Apocalypse	Yes	Yes	No	La Petite Apocalypse
1997	Mad City	Yes	No	No	Mad City
2002	Amen.	Yes	Yes	No	Amen.
2005	The Axe	Yes	Yes	No	Le Couperet
2006	The Colonel	No	Yes	Yes	Mon colonel
2009	Eden Is West	Yes	Yes	Yes	Eden à l'ouest
2012	Capital	Yes	Yes	No	Le Capital
2019	Adults in the Room	Yes	Yes	No	Ενήλικοι στην Αίθουσα
2024	Last Breath	Yes	Yes	No	Le dernier souffle

== Short films ==
Year	Title	Director	Writer	Notes
1958	Les Ratés	Yes	Yes	
1991	Pour Kim Song-Man	Yes	—N/a	Part of Contre l'Oubli film compilation
1995	Lumière and Company	Yes	—N/a	Original title: Lumière et Compagnie
1995	À propos de Nice, la suite	Yes	Yes	Segment: "Les Kankobals"

== As a producer ==
Year	Title	Notes
1969	Ce n'est pas que le début	Short documentary Credited as Kostas Gavras
1985	Tea in the Harem	Also photographer
1989	Pleure pas my love	
2016	I Still Hide to Smoke	Uncredited

== Additional credits ==
Year	Title	Credit(s)
1960	Croesus	Assistant director
1961	All the Gold in the World	Assistant director
1962	A Monkey in Winter	Assistant director
1963	Bay of Angels	Assistant director
1963	The Day and the Hour	Assistant director
1964	Joy House	Assistant director
1964	Backfire	Assistant director
1997	Mad City	Songwriter: "Cliff's Theme Song"
2009	Home	Advisor
2018	Les Bonnes Conditions	Photographer
2018	The Other Side of the Wind	Archival consultant
2019	Adults in the Room	Editor

== Acting appearances ==
Year	Title	Role	Notes
1971	On vous parle de Prague	Himself	Short documentary
1975	Special Section	Militiaman	Uncredited
1977	Madame Rosa	Doctor Ramon	
1985	Spies Like Us	Tadzhik Highway Patrol	
1996	The Stupids	Gas Station Guy	
2010	Burke & Hare	French Family	

== See also ==
- List of awards and nominations received by Costa-Gavras

== Sources ==
- Costa-Gavras filmography at IMDb
- Costa-Gavras at UniFrance (in French)
- Costa-Gavras at AlloCiné (in French)
