= List of awards and nominations received by Costa-Gavras =

The following is a list of awards and nominations received by Greek-French filmmaker Costa-Gavras.

== Academy Awards ==
Year	Category	Nominated work	Result	Ref.
1970	Best Director	Z	Nominated	
1970	Best Adapted Screenplay	Z	Nominated	
1983	Best Adapted Screenplay	Missing	Won	

== Amandaprisen ==
Year	Category	Nominated work	Result	Ref.
2006	Film DVD	The Ax	Nominated	

== Athens International Film Festival ==
Year	Category	Nominated work	Result	Ref.
2019	Honorary Award	Himself	Won	

== Berlin Film Festival ==
Year	Category	Nominated work	Result	Ref.
1990	Golden Bear	Music Box	Won	
1990	Jury Prize	Music Box	Nominated	
1990	Best Director	Music Box	Nominated	
1993	Golden Bear	The Little Apocalypse	Nominated	
2002	Golden Bear	Amen.	Nominated	
2002	Berlinale Camera	Himself	Won	

== British Academy Film Awards ==
Year	Category	Nominated work	Result	Ref.
1970	Best Film	Z	Nominated	
1970	Best Screenplay	Z	Nominated	
1970	United Nations Award	Z	Nominated	
1971	United Nations Award	The Confession	Nominated	
1974	United Nations Award	State of Siege	Won	
1983	Best Film	Missing	Nominated	
1983	Best Direction	Missing	Nominated	
1983	Best Screenplay	Missing	Won	

== Cannes Film Festival ==
Year	Category	Nominated work	Result	Ref.
1969	Grand Prix	Z	Nominated	
1969	Jury Prize	Z	Won	
1969	Best Director	Z	Nominated	
1975	Palme d'Or	Section spéciale	Nominated	
1975	Grand Prix	Section spéciale	Nominated	
1975	Best Director	Section spéciale	Won	
1975	Prize of the Ecumenical Jury	Section spéciale	Nominated	
1982	Palme d'Or	Missing	Won	
1982	Grand Prix	Missing	Nominated	
1982	Best Director	Missing	Nominated	
1982	Prize of the Ecumenical Jury	Missing	Nominated	
1982	Best Artistic Contribution Prize	Missing	Nominated	
1982	Award of the Youth	Missing	Nominated	

== Catalonia International Prize ==
Year	Category	Nominated work	Result	Ref.
2017	Catalonia International Prize	Himself	Won	

== César Awards ==
Year	Category	Nominated work	Result	Ref.
1980	Best Film	Womanlight	Nominated	
1980	Best Director	Womanlight	Nominated	
2003	Best Film	Amen.	Nominated	
2003	Best Director	Amen.	Nominated	
2003	Best Original Screenplay or Adaptation	Amen.	Won	
2006	Best Adaptation	The Ax	Nominated	
2020	Best Adaptation	Adults in the Room	Nominated	
2025	Honorary César	Himself	Honored	

== CinEuphoria Awards ==
Year	Category	Nominated work	Result	Ref.
2020	Freedom of Expression - Honorary Award	Adults in the Room	Won	

== Cineuropa ==
Year	Category	Nominated work	Result	Ref.
2017	Premio Cineuropa	Himself	Won	

== COLCOA ==
Year	Category	Nominated work	Result	Ref.
2009	Critics' Award	Eden Is West	Won	

== Copenhagen International Film Festival ==
Year	Category	Nominated work	Result	Ref.
2005	Lifetime Achievement Award	Himself	Won	

== David di Donatello Awards ==
Year	Category	Nominated work	Result	Ref.
1983	Best Foreign Film	Missing	Nominated	
1983	Best Foreign Director	Missing	Nominated	
1983	Best Foreign Screenplay	Missing	Nominated	

== Directors Guild of America Awards ==
Year	Category	Nominated work	Result	Ref.
1969	Outstanding Directing – Feature Film	Z	Nominated	

== Edgar Allan Poe Awards ==
Year	Category	Nominated work	Result	Ref.
1967	Best Motion Picture Screenplay	The Sleeping Car Murders	Nominated	
1970	Best Motion Picture Screenplay	Z	Won	

== Efebo d'oro ==
Year	Category	Nominated work	Result	Ref.
2021	Life Achievement Award	Himself	Won	

== European Film Awards ==
Year	Category	Nominated work	Result	Ref.
2018	Honorary Award	Himself	Won	
2020	Best Screenwriter	Adults in the Room	Nominated	

== Festival Internacional de Cine de Huesca ==
Year	Category	Nominated work	Result	Ref.
2017	Premio Luis Buñuel	Himself	Won	

== Festival Internacional de Cine de San Cristóbal de las Casas ==
Year	Category	Nominated work	Result	Ref.
2015	Premio Ámbar	Himself	Won	

== Film by the Sea ==
Year	Category	Nominated work	Result	Ref.
2005	Film and Literature Award	The Ax	Won	

== FIPRESCI ==
Year	Category	Nominated work	Result	Ref.
2015	FIPRESCI Platinum Award	Himself	Won	

== Flaiano Prizes ==
Year	Category	Nominated work	Result	Ref.
2003	Career Award (Cinema)	Himself	Won	

== Francophone Film Festival of Greece ==
Year	Category	Nominated work	Result	Ref.
2009	Prix d'honneur	Himself	Won	

== Globo d'oro ==
Year	Category	Nominated work	Result	Ref.
2002	Best European Film	Amen.	Won	

== Golden Globe Awards ==
Year	Category	Nominated work	Result	Ref.
1970	Best Foreign Film	Z	Won	
1971	Best Foreign Film	The Confession	Nominated	
1974	Best Foreign Film	State of Siege	Nominated	
1976	Best Foreign Film	Special Section	Nominated	
1983	Best Motion Picture – Drama	Missing	Nominated	
1983	Best Director	Missing	Nominated	
1983	Best Screenplay	Missing	Nominated	

== Gopo Awards ==
Year	Category	Nominated work	Result	Ref.
2007	Best European Film	The Ax	Nominated	

== Havana Film Festival ==
Year	Category	Nominated work	Result	Ref.
2003	Premio Coral de Honor	Himself	Won	

== Hellenic Film Academy Awards ==
Year	Category	Nominated work	Result	Ref.
2014	Honorary Award	Himself	Won	

== Human Rights Watch Film Festival ==
Year	Category	Nominated work	Result	Ref.
1995	Lifetime Achievement Award	Himself	Won	

== IFG Awards ==
Year	Category	Nominated work	Result	Ref.
2016	Arts and Letters	Himself	Won	

== Istanbul Film Festival ==
Year	Category	Nominated work	Result	Ref.
2013	Lifetime Achievement Award	Himself	Won	

== Italian National Syndicate of Film Journalists ==
Year	Category	Nominated work	Result	Ref.
1970	Best Foreign Director	Z	Nominated	
1971	Best Foreign Director	The Confession	Won	
1983	Best Foreign Director	Missing	Nominated	

== Kansas City Film Critics Circle ==
Year	Category	Nominated work	Result	Ref.
1971	Best Foreign Film	Z	Won	

== LiberPress ==
Year	Category	Nominated work	Result	Ref.
2005	LiberPress Cinema Award	Himself	Won	

== Lisbon & Estoril Film Festival ==
Year	Category	Nominated work	Result	Ref.
2019	Tribute Award	Himself	Won	

== Locarno Film Festival ==
Year	Category	Nominated work	Result	Ref.
2022	Leopard Career Award	Himself	Won	

== London Film Critics' Circle ==
Year	Category	Nominated work	Result	Ref.
1983	Film of the Year	Missing	Won	
1983	Director of the Year	Missing	Won	
1983	Screenwriter of the Year	Missing	Won	

== Louis Delluc Prize ==
Year	Category	Nominated work	Result	Ref.
1972	Best Film	State of Siege	Won	

== Lumière Awards ==
Year	Category	Nominated work	Result	Ref.
2003	Best Film	Amen.	Won	
2020	Lumière d'honneur	Himself	Won	

== Magritte Awards ==
Year	Category	Nominated work	Result	Ref.
2013	Magritte d'honneur	Himself	Won	

== Monte-Carlo Film Festival ==
Year	Category	Nominated work	Result	Ref.
2017	Career Award	Himself	Won	

== Moscow International Film Festival ==
Year	Category	Nominated work	Result	Ref.
1967	Grand Prix	Shock Troops	Nominated	
2013	Special Prize for An Outstanding Contribution to Cinema		Won	

== Mostra de València ==
Year	Category	Nominated work	Result	Ref.
2009	Critics' Award	Eden Is West	Won	
2009	Special Jury Award	Eden Is West	Won	

== Mumbai International Film Festival ==
Year	Category	Nominated work	Result	Ref.
2013	Lifetime Achievement Award	Himself	Won	

== Munich International Film festival ==
Year	Category	Nominated work	Result	Ref.
2013	Best International Film	Capital	Nominated	

== National Board of Review ==
Year	Category	Nominated work	Result	Ref.
1966	Best Foreign Film	The Sleeping Car Murders	Won	
1966	Top Foreign Films	The Sleeping Car Murders	Won	
1970	Top Foreign Films	The Confession	Won	
1975	Top Foreign Films	Special Section	Won	
1982	Top Ten Films	Missing	Won	

== National Society of Film Critics Awards ==
Year	Category	Nominated work	Result	Ref.
1969	Best Film	Z	Won	
1969	Best Director	Z	Nominated	
1969	Best Screenplay	Z	Nominated	

== New York Film Critics Circle ==
Year	Category	Nominated work	Result	Ref.
1969	Best Film	Z	Won	
1969	Best Director	Z	Won	
1972	Best Film	State of Siege	Nominated	
1972	Best Director	State of Siege	Nominated	
1972	Best Screenplay	State of Siege	Nominated	
1982	Best Film	Missing	Nominated	
1982	Best Screenplay	Missing	Nominated	

== Online Film & Television Association ==
Year	Category	Nominated work	Result	Ref.
2019	OFTA Film Hall of Fame	Z	Won	

== Premios ASECAN ==
Year	Category	Nominated work	Result	Ref.
1983	Best Foreign Film	Missing	Won	

== Prix France Culture Cinéma ==
Year	Category	Nominated work	Result	Ref.
2017	Prix France Culture Cinéma Consécration	Himself	Won	

== Prix Jean-Zay ==
Year	Category	Nominated work	Result	Ref.
2021	Prix Jean-Zay	Himself	Won	

== Pune International Film Festival ==
Year	Category	Nominated work	Result	Ref.
2007	Best International Director	The Axe	Won	
2020	Best International Film	Himself	Nominated	

== SACD Awards ==
Year	Category	Nominated work	Result	Ref.
2002	Grand Prize	Himself	Won	

== San Sebastián Film Festival ==
Year	Category	Nominated work	Result	Ref.
2012	Golden Shell	Capital	Nominated	
2012	Silver Shell for Best Director	Capital	Nominated	
2012	Special Jury Prize	Capital	Nominated	
2012	Solidarity Award	Capital	Won	
2019	Donostia Award	Himself	Won	

== Sant Jordi Awards ==
Year	Category	Nominated work	Result	Ref.
1971	Best Foreign Film	The Confession	Won	

== Sofia International Film Festival ==
Year	Category	Nominated work	Result	Ref.
2013	Sofia Prize	Himself	Won	

== Terenci Moix International Award ==
Year	Category	Nominated work	Result	Ref.
2010	Film Prize	Himself	Won	

== Trophées du Film français ==
Year	Category	Nominated work	Result	Ref.
2012	Trophée d'honneur	Himself	Won	

== Turkish Film Critics Association ==
Year	Category	Nominated work	Result	Ref.
2003	Best Foreign Film	Amen.	Nominated	

== Valladolid International Film Festival ==
Year	Category	Nominated work	Result	Ref.
1986	Golden Spike (Best Film)	Family Business	Nominated	

== Venice Film Festival ==
Year	Category	Nominated work	Result	Ref.
1983	Golden Lion	Hanna K.	Nominated	
2019	Glory to the Filmmaker Award		Won	

== Writers Guild of America Awards ==
Year	Category	Nominated work	Result	Ref.
1983	Best Adapted Screenplay	Missing	Won	

== Zurich Film Festival ==
Year	Category	Nominated work	Result	Ref.
2008	Tribute Award	Himself	Won	
