= Gavras =

Gavras (Greek: Γαβράς), also transliterated Gabras or Gauras, is a Greek surname. It can refer to:

- Gabras, a Byzantine noble family with which the surname originated
- Costa-Gavras (born 1933), Greek-French filmmaker
- Alexandre Gavras (born 1969), French producer
- Julie Gavras (born 1970), French filmmaker
- Romain Gavras (born 1981), French filmmaker
