= Michèle Ray-Gavras =

French film producer and journalist

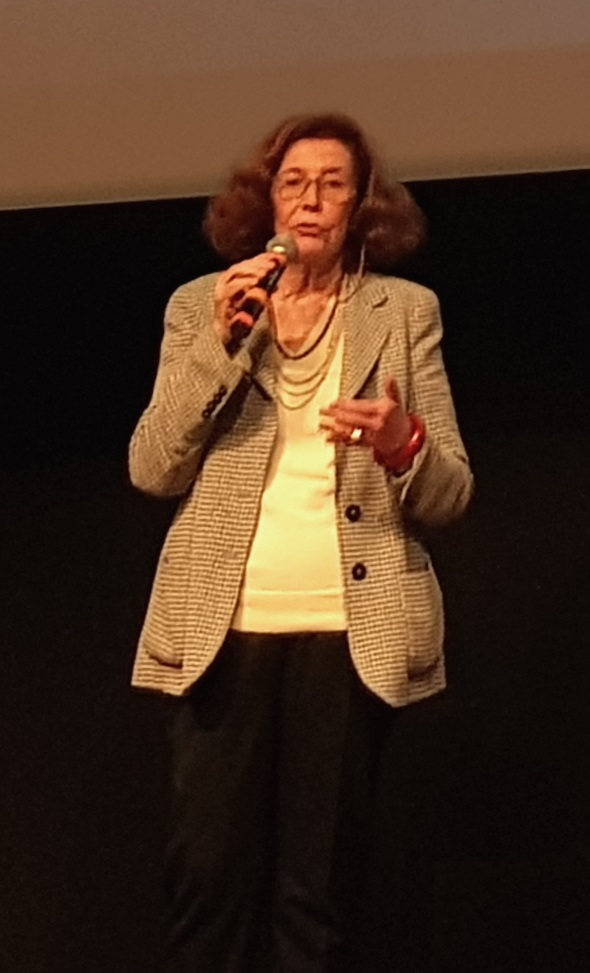
- Michèle Ray-Gavras in 2019
- Born: Michèle Suzanne Ray; 1939 (age 86–87); Paris, France
- Occupations: Journalist, film producer
- Spouse: Costa-Gavras
- Children: Alexandre Gavras; Julie Gavras; Romain Gavras

Michèle Suzanne Ray (born 1939), better known as Michèle Ray-Gavras, is a French film producer and journalist.

== Career ==
As an independent journalist between 1963 and 1977, Michèle Ray covered struggles in Vietnam and Bolivia for multiple French media.

Between April 1966 and February 1967, while reporting on the Vietnam War, Michèle Ray traveled in South Vietnam among the American GI forces. She then continued to the communist north and was captured by the Vietcong on 17 January 1967. She was liberated on 6 February after falling sick. She brought back a special report published in the Nouvel Observateur, a film that was used in the documentary Far from Vietnam, and she published a book, The Two Shores of Hell.

She traveled to Bolivia in 1967 to report on the capture and death of Che Guevara, publishing an article in Paris Match before being expelled from the country. In 1971, Michèle Ray was covering the Uruguayan general election for French television and radio, when she was kidnapped by the anarchist group OPR-33 and held for 3 days, between 29 November and 3 December before being released. Costa Gavras was in Uruguay at the time, preparing his film State of Siege.

=== Producer ===
- 1978 : The Recourse to the Method (El recurso del método) by Miguel Littín
- 1983 : Hanna K. by Costa-Gavras
- 1985 : Le Thé au harem d'Archimède by Mehdi Charef
- 1986 : Conseil de famille by Costa-Gavras
- 1987 : Miss Mona by Mehdi Charef
- 1988 : Camomille by Mehdi Charef
- 1993 : Latcho Drom by Tony Gatlif
- 1993 : La Petite Apocalypse by Costa-Gavras
- 1994 : En attendant les barbares (ou Loin des barbares) by Liria Bégéja
- 1996 : Pereira prétend (Sostiene Pereira) by Roberto Faenza
- 1996 : Mondo by Tony Gatlif
- 1996 : Rainbow pour Rimbaud by Jean Teulé
- 2002 : Le Corsaire, le magicien, le voleur et les enfants (documentaire) by Julie Gavras
- 2002 : Amen. by Costa-Gavras
- 2005 : Le Couperet by Costa-Gavras
- 2006 : Mon colonel by Laurent Herbiet
- 2007 : Cartouches gauloises by Mehdi Charef
- 2012 : Avant que de tout perdre by Xavier Legrand
- 2015 : Maintenant ils peuvent venir by Salem Brahimi
- 2015 : Graziella by Mehdi Charef
- 2017 : À mon âge je me cache encore pour fumer by Rayhana (Obermeyer)
- 2019 : Adults in the Room by Costa-Gavras
- 2025 : No Other Choice by Park Chan-wook

== Personal life ==
Ray married Costa Gavras in 1968, on the set of Z. They have 3 children, Alexandre Gavras, Julie Gavras, and Romain Gavras. She is also the mother of Patrick Maffone, from an earlier union.
