= Françoise Bonnot =

French film editor (1939–2018)

- Born: 17 August 1939; Bois-Colombes, France
- Died: 9 June 2018 (aged 78); Paris, France
- Occupation: film editor
- Spouse: Henri Verneuil
- Parent: Monique Bonnot

Françoise Bonnot (French: [fʁɑ̃swaz bɔno]; 17 August 1939 – 9 June 2018) was a French film editor with more than 40 feature film credits.

== Biography ==
Bonnot was the daughter of Monique Bonnot, a film editor noted for several films directed by Jean-Pierre Melville. In her first film credit, Françoise Bonnot was the assistant to her mother on Melville's 1959 film, Two Men in Manhattan (1959). She and her mother co-edited the 1962 film, A Monkey in Winter, that was directed by Henri Verneuil. At about this time Bonnot married Verneuil; she edited three more of his films in the 1960s. Bonnot edited Melville's 1969 film, Army of Shadows, when her mother became unavailable. This film is about the French resistance fighters during the Second World War, and was a departure from Melville's more characteristic crime and detective films. Bonnot later remarked that Melville “... had known me since I was eight years old. It was like working with my big brother. He was a character––fascinating, charming, fun and tyrannical.”

By 1968, Bonnot had commenced her notable collaboration with director Costa-Gavras that extended over eight films and nearly 30 years. Their first film together was Z (1969); James Berardinelli has written recently that, "Z was the third feature film from Greek-born Costa-Gavras, but it is the movie that captured him to the world's attention, winning a Best Foreign Language Film Oscar. It introduced the director's signature approach of combining overt political messages with edge-of-the-seat tension." After Z, their most widely recognized film together is probably Missing (1982). Their last film together was Mad City (1997).

Throughout her life, Bonnot edited the films directed by Julie Taymor, who had been known primarily as a stage director. Their films include Frida (2002) and The Tempest (2010).

Bonnot won the Academy Award for Film Editing for Z (1969), and the BAFTA Award for Best Editing for Missing (1982). She was nominated three times for the César Award for Best Editing (for The Simple Past (1977), Hannah K. (1983) and Place Vendôme (1998)). She had been elected to membership in the American Cinema Editors.

Bonnot and Henri Verneuil had two children. Their son, Patrick Malakian, is a film director; Bonnot edited his 1994 French-language film Pourquoi maman est dans mon lit?. Bonnot died on 9 June 2018 in Paris, France aged 78.

== Filmography ==
- 1962 : Un singe en hiver (dir. Henri Verneuil)
- 1963 : Mélodie en sous-sol (dir. Henri Verneuil)
- 1967 : La Vingt-cinquième Heure (dir. Henri Verneuil)
- 1968 : La Bataille de San Sebastian (dir. Henri Verneuil)
- 1969 : Z (dir. Costa-Gavras)
- 1969 : L'Armée des ombres (dir. Jean-Pierre Melville)
- 1970 : L'Aveu (dir. Costa-Gavras)
- 1971 : Four Flies on Grey Velvet (4 mosche di velluto grigio) (dir. Dario Argento)
- 1972 : Beau Masque (dir. Bernard Paul)
- 1972 : State of Siege (État de siège) (dir. Costa-Gavras)
- 1973 : Massacre in Rome (Rappresaglia) (dir. George Cosmatos)
- 1974 : Grandeur nature (dir. Luis García Berlanga)
- 1975 : Section spéciale (dir. Costa-Gavras)
- 1975 : Le Futur aux trousses (dir. Dolorès Grassian)
- 1976 : The Tenant (Le Locataire) (dir. Roman Polanski)
- 1976 : La Victoire en chantant (ou Noirs et blancs en couleur) (dir. Jean-Jacques Annaud)
- 1976 : The Cassandra Crossing (dir. George Cosmatos) (uncredited)
- 1977 : The Simple Past (dir. Michel Drach)
- 1978 : Le Dernier Amant romantique (dir. Just Jaeckin)
- 1978 : Judith Therpauve (dir. Patrice Chéreau)
- 1979 : Clair de femme (dir. Costa-Gavras)
- 1980 : Chère inconnue (dir. Moshé Mizrahi)
- 1981 : Une sale affaire (dir. Alain Bonnot)
- 1982 : Missing (dir. Costa-Gavras)
- 1983 : Hanna K. (dir. Costa-Gavras)
- 1984 : Un amour de Swann de Volker Schlöndorff
- 1984 : Top Secret! (dir. Zucker, Abrahams and Zucker)
- 1984 : Liste noire (dir. Alain Bonnot)
- 1985 : Year of the Dragon (dir. Michael Cimino)
- 1987 : The Sicilian (dir. Michael Cimino)
- 1989 : Fat Man and Little Boy (dir. Roland Joffé)
- 1991 : The Plant (dir. Alexandre Gavras) (short film)
- 1992 : 1492: Conquest of Paradise (dir. Ridley Scott)
- 1994 : Pourquoi maman est dans mon lit ? (dir. Patrick Malakian)
- 1996 : L'Appartement (The Apartment) (dir. Gilles Mimouni)
- 1997 : Mad City (dir. Costa-Gavras)
- 1998 : Place Vendôme (dir. Nicole Garcia)
- 1999 : Titus (dir. Julie Taymor)
- 2000 : Disappearing Acts (dir. Gina Prince-Bythewood) (TV film)
- 2002 : Frida (dir. Julie Taymor)
- 2004 : Around the Bend (dir. Jordan Roberts)
- 2007 : Across the Universe (dir. Julie Taymor)
- 2010 : The Tempest (dir. Julie Taymor)
- 2010 : Un balcon sur la mer (dir. Nicole Garcia)
- 2011 : El Gusto (dir. Safinez Bousbia)

== See also ==
- List of film director and editor collaborations
