= 28th César Awards =

2003 French film awards ceremony

- Date: 22 February 2003
- Site: Théâtre du Châtelet, Paris, France
- Hosted by: Géraldine Pailhas

Highlights
- Best Film: The Pianist
- Best Actor: Adrien Brody; The Pianist
- Best Actress: Isabelle Carré; Beautiful Memories

Television coverage
- Network: Canal+

The 28th César Awards ceremony, presented by the Académie des Arts et Techniques du Cinéma, honoured the best films of 2002 in France and took place on 22 February 2003 at the Théâtre du Châtelet in Paris. The ceremony was hosted by Géraldine Pailhas. The Pianist won the award for Best Film.

== Winners and nominees ==
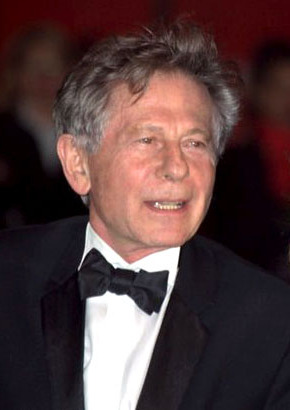
Roman Polanski, Best Film and Best Director winner

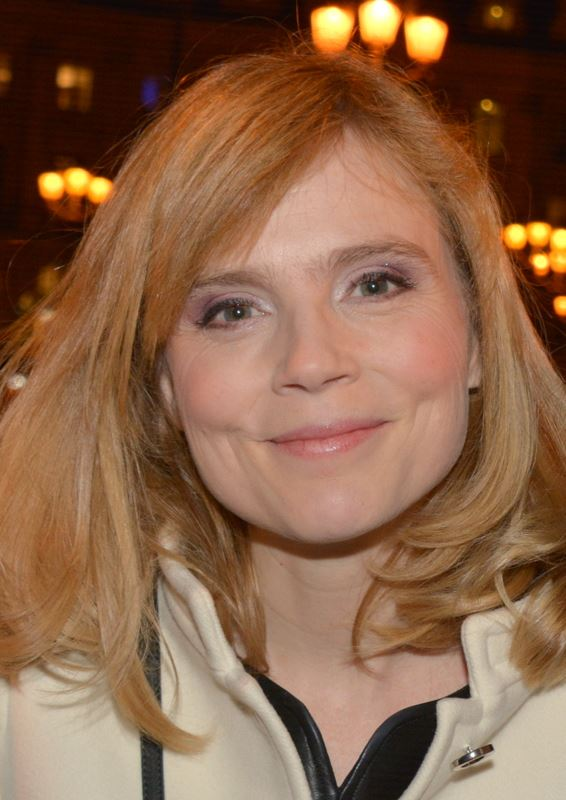
Isabelle Carré, Best Actress winner

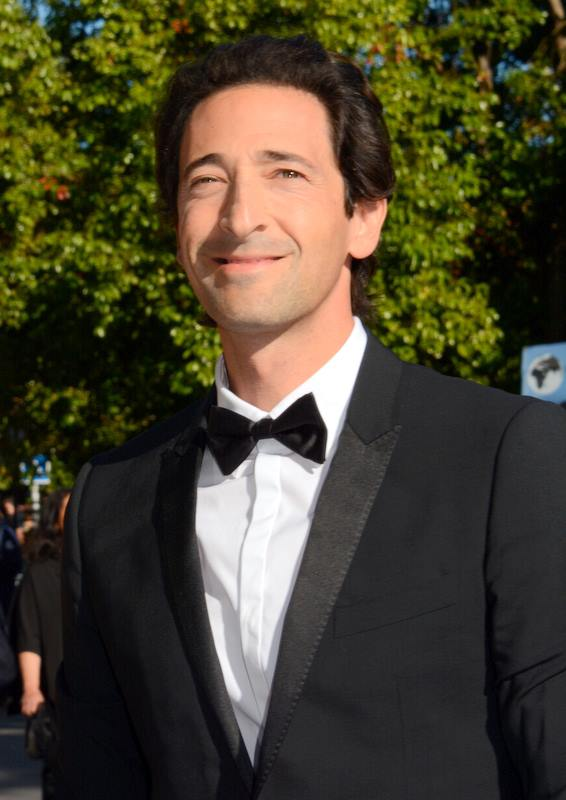
Adrien Brody, Best Actor winner

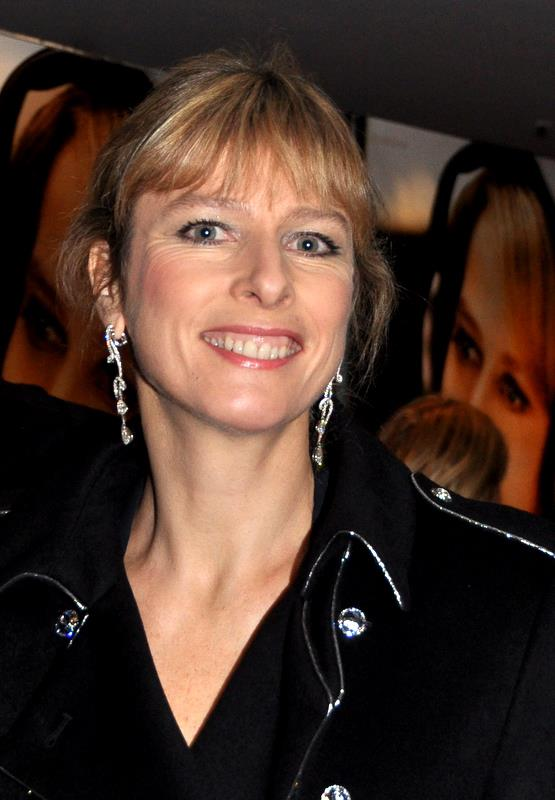
Karin Viard, Best Supporting Actress winner

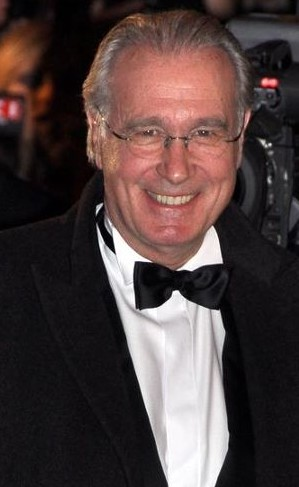
Bernard Le Coq, Best Supporting Actor winner

Best Film The Pianist: 8 Women; Amen.; L'Auberge Espagnole; To Be and to Have	Best Director Roman Polanski – The Pianist: François Ozon – 8 Women; Costa-Gavras – Amen.; Cédric Klapisch – L'Auberge Espagnole; Nicolas Philibert – To Be and to Have
Best Actor Adrien Brody – The Pianist: Daniel Auteuil – The Adversary; François Berléand – Whatever You Say; Bernard Campan – Beautiful Memories; Mathieu Kassovitz – Amen.	Best Actress Isabelle Carré – Beautiful Memories: Fanny Ardant – 8 Women; Ariane Ascaride – Marie-Jo and Her Two Lovers; Juliette Binoche – Jet Lag; Isabelle Huppert – 8 Women
Best Supporting Actor Bernard Le Coq – Beautiful Memories: François Cluzet – The Adversary; Gérard Darmon – Asterix & Obelix: Mission Cleopatra; Jamel Debbouze – Asterix & Obelix: Mission Cleopatra; Denis Podalydès – Summer Things	Best Supporting Actress Karin Viard – Summer Things: Dominique Blanc – Special Delivery; Danielle Darrieux – 8 Women; Emmanuelle Devos – The Adversary; Judith Godrèche – L'Auberge Espagnole
Most Promising Actor Jean-Paul Rouve – Monsieur Batignole: Lorànt Deutsch – Shooting Stars; Morgan Marinne – The Son; Gaspard Ulliel – Summer Things; Malik Zidi – A Moment of Happiness	Most Promising Actress Cécile de France – L'Auberge Espagnole: Émilie Dequenne – A Housekeeper; Mélanie Doutey – The Warrior's Brother; Marina Foïs – Hypnotized and Hysterical (Hairstylist Wanted); Ludivine Sagnier – 8 Women
Best Original Screenplay or Adaptation Amen. – Costa Gavras and Jean-Claude Grumberg: 8 Women – François Ozon and Marina de Van; L'Auberge Espagnole – Cédric Klapisch; Summer Things – Michel Blanc; The Pianist – Ronald Harwood	Best Film from the European Union Talk to Her: 11'09"01 September 11; Gosford Park; The Man Without a Past; Sweet Sixteen
Best First Feature Film Beautiful Memories: Carnage; Hypnotized and Hysterical (Hairstylist Wanted); Irène; Whatever You Say	Best Cinematography Paweł Edelman – The Pianist: Jeanne Lapoirie – 8 Women; Patrick Blossier – Amen.
Best Editing Nicolas Philibert – To Be and to Have: Francine Sandberg – L'Auberge Espagnole; Hervé de Luze – The Pianist	Best Sound Gérard Hardy, Jean-Marie Blondel and Dean Humphreys – The Pianist: Pierre Gamet, Jean-Pierre Laforce and Benoît Hillebrant – 8 Women; Dominique Gaborieau, Francis Wargnier and Pierre Gamet – Amen.
Best Original Music Wojciech Kilar – The Pianist: Krishna Levy – 8 Women; Armand Amar – Amen.; Antoine Duhamel – Safe Conduct	Best Costume Design Tanino Liberatore, Philippe Guillotel and Florence Sadaune – Asterix & Obelix: Mission Cleopatra: Pascaline Chavanne – 8 Women; Anna B. Sheppard – The Pianist
Best Production Design Allan Starski – The Pianist: Arnaud de Moleron – 8 Women; Hoang Thanh At – Asterix & Obelix: Mission Cleopatra; Emile Ghigo – Safe Conduct	Best Short Film Peau de vache: Candidature; Ce vieux rêve qui bouge; Squash
Best Foreign Film Bowling for Columbine: Chi-hwa-seon; Minority Report; Ocean's Eleven; Spirited Away
Honorary César Bernadette Lafont; Spike Lee; Meryl Streep

== See also ==
- 75th Academy Awards
- 56th British Academy Film Awards
- 15th European Film Awards
- 8th Lumière Awards
