= Julie Gavras =

French film director and screenwriter

- Born: Eléna Julie Gavras; Paris, France
- Occupations: Director, screenwriter
- Years active: 1994–present
- Parents: Costa-Gavras (father); Michèle Ray-Gavras (mother)
- Relatives: Alexandre Gavras (brother); Romain Gavras (brother)

Julie Gavras is a French film director and screenwriter. She is known for her film Blame It on Fidel (2006).

== Life and career ==
Gavras started as an assistant director in Italy and France on commercials, television movies and feature films. She worked with directors such as Robert Enrico, Claire Devers, Jacques Nolot, Alexandre Jardin, Camille de Casabianca, Roberto Faenza and Michele Soavi. She also worked with her father Costa-Gavras on his 2002 World War II drama Amen., on which she served as an assistant director.

In 1998, she directed a short film called Oh les beaux dimanches! produced in Marseille by Comic Strip. Two years later, she directed her first documentary, From Dawn to Night: Songs by Moroccan Women. It was based on a play by Alain Weber mounted at the Bouffes du Nord theater in Paris during the Festival d'Automne. It was broadcast on Arte. In 2002, her second documentary film was released theatrically in France: The Pirate, the Wizard, the Thief and the Children. The film looks at a class of nine-year-olds who make a film at school.

Her first fiction feature film, Blame It on Fidel, premiered at the Deauville American Film Festival in 2006. It was followed by Late Bloomers, a romantic comedy film starring Isabella Rossellini and William Hurt, which was screened at the 61st Berlin International Film Festival.

== Filmography ==
Year	Film	Role(s)
2002	The Pirate, the Wizard, the Thief and the Children	Director, cinematographer
2006	Blame It on Fidel	Director, writer
2011	Late Bloomers	Director, writer
2018	Les Bonnes Conditions	Director, writer, cinematographer
