= Last Breath (2024 film) =

2024 French film by Costa-Gavras

- Poster
- French: Le Dernier Souffle
- Directed by: Costa-Gavras
- Screenplay by: Costa-Gavras
- Based on: Le dernier souffle: Accompagner la fin de vie by: Régis Debray; Claude Grange
- Starring: Denis Podalydès; Kad Merad; Marilyne Canto
- Cinematography: Nathalie Durand; Olivier Rostan
- Music by: Armand Amar
- Release dates: September 2024 (San Sebastián); 12 February 2025
- Running time: 97 minutes
- Country: France
- Language: French

Last Breath (French: Le Dernier Souffle) is a 2024 drama film directed by Costa-Gavras. It stars Denis Podalydès, Kad Merad, Marilyne Canto and Ángela Molina.

== Plot ==
Fabrice Toussaint, a philosopher and author, undergoes an MRI and is diagnosed with cancer. He meets doctor Augustin Masset, who is in charge of a palliative care unit. They both speak about the end of life and reflect on their own lives. Toussaint also visits some of Masset's patients and analyses how they face their last days in order to write a book about it.

== Cast ==
- Denis Podalydès as Fabrice Toussaint
- Kad Merad as Augustin Masset
- Marilyne Canto
- Ángela Molina as Estrella
- Charlotte Rampling
- Hiam Abbass
- Karin Viard
- Agathe Bonitzer

== Production ==
Costa-Gavras wrote the script, based on the actual book the philosopher Régis Debray wrote alongside doctor Claude Grange. His wife, Michèle Ray-Gavras, and their son, Alexandre Gavras, were producers.

== Release ==
Last Breath had its world premiere in the official competition of the 72nd San Sebastián International Film Festival. The film was pre-released on 10 February 2025 in Versalles. It was released theatrically in France on 12 February 2025.

== Reception ==
Carlos Boyero, writing for El País, stated that the film is "didactic and honest".

== See also ==
- List of French films of 2024
