= Mad City (film) =

1997 film by Constantin Costa-Gavras

- Theatrical release poster
- Directed by: Costa-Gavras
- Screenplay by: Tom Matthews
- Story by: Tom Matthews; Eric Williams
- Produced by: Arnold Kopelson; Anne Kopelson
- Starring: Dustin Hoffman; John Travolta; Alan Alda; Mia Kirshner; Ted Levine; Robert Prosky; Blythe Danner
- Cinematography: Patrick Blossier
- Edited by: Françoise Bonnot
- Music by: Thomas Newman
- Production companies: Arnold Kopelson Productions; Punch Productions
- Distributed by: Warner Bros.
- Release date: November 7, 1997
- Running time: 114 minutes
- Country: United States
- Language: English
- Budget: $50 million
- Box office: $10.5 million

Mad City is a 1997 American thriller drama film directed by Costa-Gavras, written by Tom Matthews based on a story by Matthews and Eric Williams, and starring Dustin Hoffman and John Travolta, with a supporting cast featuring Mia Kirshner, Alan Alda, Blythe Danner, Ted Levine, Raymond J. Barry and Larry King. This is Costa-Gavras's first English-language film since Music Box. The title comes from a nickname of Madison, Wisconsin, where the film was originally going to be set and was used for its multiple meanings.

== Plot ==
After being sacked from his job at a museum, former security guard Sam Baily returns to the place with a shotgun and dynamite and takes his former boss Mrs. Banks and a number of children (at the museum on a school field trip) as hostages. Local television journalist Max Brackett is in the museum using the restroom after an interview with the curator about financial difficulties. He becomes directly involved in the hostage situation, acting as Baily's intermediary to the outside world and the police.

Baily accidentally shoots a friend of his, Cliff Williams, who's still working there as a security guard, sending him to the hospital. He later fires the weapon again, frightening the children and becoming increasingly unstable as he takes caffeine pills to stay awake. Along with the young intern coworker Laurie Callahan among the growing media circus outside, Brackett reports the inside story exclusively on television, reviving his career. By being free to come and go, he negotiates with a national network and its star news anchorman, Kevin Hollander, with whom Brackett has an unhappy history.

Baily wants the police to let him return home to his wife Jenny and kids, refusing to accept that he's going to jail. Brackett, on the other hand, makes a deal rather than let Hollander have the story, prompting Hollander to publicly accuse Brackett of prolonging the crisis and endangering the children. Laurie then betrays Brackett, proving that, like him, she's willing to do whatever it takes to further her own career.

When his friend Cliff dies, Baily starts to realize he's lost everything. Baily and Brackett allow the situation to worsen until the police finally have had enough, issuing a five-minute ultimatum to Baily for release of the hostages. Baily lets the children and Mrs. Banks go. He also sends out Brackett to try to convince the police to put down their guns so he could personally usher out Baily. But rather than face prison and Jenny, Baily locks the museum doors on Brackett, who's outside trying to get the police to listen.

Brackett tries to get him to come out, but Baily ignores him. Brackett is unaware that Baily has decided to set off his explosives, committing suicide. The blast knocks Brackett off his feet and into the parking lot, sending debris everywhere. As reporters surround Brackett to ask about Baily, all he can say is, "We killed him," referring to how the media handled the situation.

== Cast ==
- John Travolta as Sam Baily
- Dustin Hoffman as Max Brackett
- Alan Alda as Kevin Hollander
- Mia Kirshner as Laurie Callahan
- William Atherton as Dohlen
- Raymond J. Barry as Agent Dobbins
- Ted Levine as Chief Alvin Lemke
- Robert Prosky as Lou Potts
- Blythe Danner as Mrs. Banks
- Akosua Busia as Diane
- Randall Batinkoff as Executive
- Lucinda Jenney as Jenny Baily
- William O'Leary as Executive
- Tammy Lauren as Miss Rose
- Ebbe Roe Smith as Bartholomew
- Kyla Pratt as Kid
- John Landis as Doctor
- Julio Oscar Mechoso as Sergeant
- David Clennon as Street Preacher
- Jay Leno as Himself
- Richard Portnow as Agent
- Bill Rafferty as Bill Gottsegen
- Sean O'Kane as Assistant
- Patricia Smith as Jenny's Mother
- Dirk Blocker as Bowler
- Bill Nunn as Cliff Williams (uncredited)
- Larry King as Himself (uncredited)

== Production ==
In April 1994, it was announced Universal had purchased a spec script titled Mad City written by Tom Matthews from a story co-authored by Matthews and Eric Williams. The script eventually went into turnaround, where it ended up at Warner Bros.

== Release ==
=== Box office ===
In the United States, Mad City opened at #6 at the box office, with an opening weekend gross of $4.6 million. It went on to gross $10.5 million, but when compared to its $50 million budget, Mad City was a box-office bomb.

=== Critical reception ===
The film has a score of 32% on Rotten Tomatoes, based on 31 reviews. On Metacritic, the film has a score of 45 out of 100 (mixed or average), based on 23 reviews. Audiences polled by CinemaScore gave the film an average grade of "B−" on an A+ to F scale. Film critic Roger Ebert of the Chicago Sun-Times noted Mad City is inspired by the film Ace in the Hole, and gave the movie two stars of four, writing, "The movie knows what it wants to do, but lacks the velocity for lift-off."

At the 1997 Stinkers Bad Movie Awards, John Travolta was nominated for Worst Actor, but lost to Tom Arnold for McHale's Navy.

== See also ==
- Gladbeck hostage crisis
