= Late Bloomers (2011 film) =

- Theatrical release poster
- French: Trois fois 20 ans
- Directed by: Julie Gavras
- Written by: Julie Gavras; Olivier Dazat
- Produced by: Sylvia Pialat; Bertrand Faivre
- Starring: William Hurt; Isabella Rossellini; Doreen Mantle; Kate Ashfield; Aidan McArdle; Arta Dobroshi; Luke Treadaway; Leslie Phillips; Hugo Speer; Joanna Lumley; Simon Callow
- Cinematography: Nathalie Durand
- Edited by: Pierre Haberer
- Music by: Sodi Marciszewer
- Production companies: Les Films du Worso; The Bureau; Gaumont; Be-Films
- Distributed by: Gaumont
- Release dates: 18 February 2011 (Berlin); 13 July 2011 (France)
- Running time: 95 mins
- Countries: France; Belgium; United Kingdom
- Languages: English; Italian
- Box office: $1.4 million

Late Bloomers (French: Trois fois 20 ans) is a 2011 romantic comedy-drama film directed by Julie Gavras and starring William Hurt and Isabella Rossellini. The film premiered on 18 February 2011 at the 61st Berlin International Film Festival. It was released theatrically in France on 13 July 2011 by Gaumont.

== Plot ==
A couple, Adam (William Hurt) and Mary (Isabella Rossellini), are both heading into their sixties, but react to this differently. A retired teacher, Mary begins to make adjustments to their home to make it more practical for their age. Adam is defensive to any changes and fiercely defends his progression as an architect. They live in London, next door to Mary's mother, Nora, who raised her daughter in Italy. Mary worries about an incident of memory loss and her doctor prescribes her to keep active. Adam, insulted by an offer to design a retirement home, instead turns his attention to the proposal of a young associate, Maya (Arta Dobroshi), to participate in a competition to design a new museum. Adam becomes nocturnal, working on the project overnight with young associates. Mary becomes used to an increasingly empty home, but attracts an admirer at the gym.

== Cast ==
- William Hurt as Adam
- Isabella Rossellini as Mary
- Doreen Mantle as Nora
- Kate Ashfield as Giulia
- Arta Dobroshi as Maya
- Luke Treadaway as Benjamin
- Leslie Phillips as Leo
- Hugo Speer as Peter
- Joanna Lumley as Charlotte
- Simon Callow as Richard
- Aidan McArdle as James

== Reception ==
Late Bloomers has received mixed reviews from critics. Rotten Tomatoes gave the film a score of 43%, based on 14 reviews. Metacritic gave the film a rating of 53/100, based on 10 reviews.
