= Eden Is West =

- Directed by: Costa-Gavras
- Written by: Costa-Gavras; Jean-Claude Grumberg
- Produced by: Michele Ray-Gavras; Manos Krezias
- Starring: Riccardo Scamarcio; Ulrich Tukur; Juliane Köhler; Éric Caravaca; Jean-Christophe Folly; Anny Duperey; Ieroklis Michailidis
- Cinematography: Patrick Blossier
- Edited by: Yannick Kergoat
- Music by: Armand Amar
- Distributed by: Pathé
- Release dates: 11 February 2009 (France); 19 February 2009 (Greece)
- Running time: 110 minutes
- Countries: France; Greece
- Languages: French; Greek; English

Eden Is West (French: Eden à l'ouest) is a 2009 adventure drama film by Greek-French director Costa-Gavras about an illegal immigrant called Elias who tries to get to Paris. The original title in Greek is "Paradissos sti Dysi" ("Paradise in West").

The nationality of the main character hero is not disclosed during the film, Gavras wanted to make a point about illegal immigrants of any nationality, since he himself was an immigrant.

The film had its world premiere out of the competition at the 59th Berlin International Film Festival.

== Plot ==
Elias (Riccardo Scamarcio) is an immigrant in his twenties who tries to get to Europe by a boat along with other illegal immigrants. When the boat is near the Greek shores and they hope they will soon disembark, a marine patrol approaches and Elias jumps into the sea in order to avoid arrest. So do the other people in the boat. He wakes up next morning in a shore with nudists, which is not so bad after all, since he has lost some of his clothes while he was swimming for quite a few hours. He pretends to be a nudist himself, steals some clothes and he pretends he is an employee of the hotel "Eden Club-Paradise". Some residents consider him to be an employee and some others a client like themselves. He meets a magician (Ulrich Tukur) who hires him for a few tricks and since Elias is fairly good, Nick Nickelby, as the magician is called in the movie, tells him "if you find yourself in Paris, come and find me". Elias considers it an invitation and a great opportunity. Going to Paris becomes an obsession.

In the meantime nasty things happen to him: he is raped by the manager of the hotel and in another occasion he is obliged to clean a toilet with his hands because a tenant considers him to be a plumber. He also happens to witness the arrest of a friend of his, an illegal immigrant, who is discovered hiding near the hotel. He also sees the dead bodies of two immigrants who didn't make it and drowned trying to swim to shore.

A middle-aged German woman named Christina (Juliane Köhler) wants him as her lover and offers him refuge in her room. She also gives him money. He leaves the "Eden Club" and tries to travel to Paris by hitch-hiking, without realising how far it is. A man takes advantage of his ignorance and says he will take him to Paris as long as he shares the expenses. Elias wants to prove he can afford it and shows an envelope where he keeps his money. The man steals his money and leaves. A peasant woman passes by with her tractor and takes Elias to her home; there he helps her sell birds and is friendly with her children. Soon after that, he leaves.

The other day he continues his hitchhiking and a couple of Greeks with a Mercedes help him, but some time later they disagree concerning his presence, quarrel and abandon him in snowy mountains. A German truck driver stops and picks him up –he also gives him a jacket. Then he finds a job in a factory, but he realises that his employer is not going to keep his promise and take care of the immigration process. Also, when he tries to eat in the same restaurant with the local employees he is pushed back and this racist episode compels him to run away again.

He ends up in a village hungry and without proper clothes. He steals a jacket but he is found out and is again on the run while somebody cries "damned gypsies". Some gypsies think he is a gypsy and they help him picking him up with their truck. They show him the way for Paris laughing at him for his dream. When he leaves he sees two other trucks approaching the encampment and questioning the gypsies where the thief they've just helped is hiding. They are friends of the man from whom he had stolen the jacket. They leave after they throw a petrol bomb in one of their trailers.

Elias, on the run again, finds himself in a village where he meets a compatriot. This is the only time that his mother language is heard. The other immigrant is disillusioned from the "West" and says he is heading back to his country, because there are no jobs in Paris, he does not have any savings, and life back home seems better. He sleeps in a refuge with other homeless people, who steal his jacket. The next day he is heading for Paris and finds club "Lido".

Finally he finds the magician giving a performance from a beautiful, red Citroen DS cabriolet in the street. He approaches him full of expectations and he thinks the magician recognises him. But when the show ends, the magician leaves. Elias runs after the magicians car and cries "Mister" and when the magicians driver stops, the young immigrant tells him "don't you recognise me? You once told me that if I found myself in Paris, I should come and see you". The magician stares at him and says "Aha, so you've done both. You came in Paris and you also saw me". He then gives him a small toy magic wand and leaves. Elias, embarrassed, points the wand awkwardly toward the Eiffel Tower and by chance the lights on the Tower are lit. Thus, he thinks that indeed this is a magic wand. When many police officers appear, he is scared. He points the magic wand at them, but nothing happens. He puts the wand in his pocket and starts walking toward the gleaming Eiffel Tower.

== Cast ==
- Riccardo Scamarcio as Elias
- Juliane Köhler as Christina
- Ulrich Tukur as Nick Nickleby
- Anny Duperey as Nice woman
- Mona Achache as Marie-Lou
- Bruno Lochet as Yann
- Antoine Monot, Jr. as Karl
- Eric Caravaca as the assistant manager of the hotel
- Jean-Christophe Folly as Le chanteur / musicien
- Ieroklis Michailidis as L'homme du couple dans la Mercedes
- Michel Robin as The Lido's doorman
- Konstantinos Markoulakis as Yvan
- David Lowe as Fred
- Tasos Kostis as Le chauffeur voleur

== Production ==
The language spoken by the immigrants was invented by screenwriters Jean-Claude Grumberg and Costa-Gavras so that the main character's nationality could not be guessed. Costa-Gavras explained: "We reversed French words! A linguist friend listened to the result and told us: 'It sounds like a Semitic language, but the structure is French'… he had us make corrections to make it sound more like it came from 'over there'… a distant 'over there'".

Filming locations included Hautes-Alpes Seine-et-Marne, Essonne, Paris, and Greece (mostly in Crete).

== Release ==
The film had its world premiere at the 2009 Berlinale. It won the critics award in the festival of City of Lights, City of Los Angeles.

== Reception ==
On the review aggregator website Rotten Tomatoes, 88% of 8 critics' reviews are positive.
