= Blame It on Fidel =

- Theatrical release poster
- French: La Faute à Fidel
- Directed by: Julie Gavras
- Screenplay by: Julie Gavras
- Based on: Tutta colpa di Fidel by Domitilla Calamai
- Produced by: Sylvie Pialat; Mathieu Bompoint
- Starring: Nina Kervel-Bey; Julie Depardieu; Stefano Accorsi
- Cinematography: Nathalie Durand
- Edited by: Pauline Dairou
- Music by: Armand Amar
- Production companies: Canal+ CineCinema; France 3 Cinéma
- Distributed by: Gaumont Columbia TriStar Films
- Release date: 26 November 2006
- Running time: 98 minutes
- Countries: France; Italy
- Language: French
- Box office: $1,360,243

Blame It on Fidel (French: La Faute à Fidel) is a 2006 French-Italian drama film directed by Julie Gavras. The screenplay, written by Gavras, is based on Domitilla Calamai's Italian novel of the same name. The film stars Nina Kervel-Bey, Julie Depardieu, and Stefano Accorsi.

The film covers an array of philosophy and ideology - everything from Communism to Catholicism to Greek and Asian mythology - which the protagonist must reconstruct from confusion into her own set of beliefs.

== Plot ==
Nine-year-old Anna de la Mesa weathers big changes in her household as her parents become radical political activists in 1970-71 Paris. Her Spanish-born lawyer father Fernando is inspired by his sister's opposition to Franco and by Salvador Allende's victory in Chile; he quits his job and becomes a liaison for Chilean activists in France. Her mother, Marie, a Marie Claire journalist-turned-writer documenting the stories of women's abortion ordeals, supports her husband and climbs aboard the ideological bandwagon. As a result, Anna's French bourgeois life is over. She must adjust to refugee nannies, international cuisine, and a cramped apartment full of noisy revolutionaries.

== Cast ==
- Nina Kervel-Bey as Anna de la Mesa
- Julie Depardieu as Marie de la Mesa
- Stefano Accorsi as Fernando de la Mesa
- Benjamin Feuillet as François de la Mesa
- Marie Kremer as Isabelle
- Raphaël Personnaz as Mathieu
- Carole Franck as Sister Geneviève
- Martine Chevallier as Bonne Maman
- Olivier Perrier as Bon Papa

== Release ==
Blame It on Fidel premiered at the Deauville American Film Festival on 10 September 2006 and opened theatrically in France on 29 November that year. It opened in North American release on 3 August 2007.

=== Box office ===
The film earned $9,004 in its opening weekend, ranking number 64 in the domestic box office. It went on to gross $168,065 domestically and $1,192,178 overseas for a worldwide total of $1,360,243.

=== Critical reception ===
The film holds a 93% approval rating on review aggregator website Rotten Tomatoes based on 45 critics. On Metacritic, the film has a 74/100 rating, indicating "generally favorable reviews".
