= The Colonel (2006 film) =

- Film poster
- Mon colonel
- Directed by: Laurent Herbiet
- Screenplay by: Costa-Gavras; Jean-Claude Grumberg; Laurent Herbiet
- Based on: Mon colonel by Francis Zamponi
- Produced by: Salem Brahimi; Costa-Gavras; Jean-Pierre Dardenne; Luc Dardenne; Michèle Ray-Gavras
- Starring: Olivier Gourmet; Robinson Stévenin; Cécile de France
- Cinematography: Patrick Blossier
- Edited by: Nicole Berckmans
- Music by: Armand Amar
- Production companies: K.G. Productions; Les Films du Fleuve
- Distributed by: Pathé
- Release dates: 11 September 2006 (TIFF); 5 November 2006 (France)
- Running time: 110 minutes
- Countries: France; Belgium
- Language: French
- Budget: € 5.2 million

The Colonel (French: Mon colonel) is a 2006 French-Belgian film directed by Laurent Herbiet, based on a novel by Francis Zamponi.

== Plot ==
France, 1993. The retired Colonel Raoul Duplan is shot in his home. As the police are baffled, young army officer Galois is brought to help the investigation. Shortly thereafter she receives a letter containing some diary pages of a lieutenant Guy Rossi who served in 1955 in the Algerian war under the command of Duplan and disappeared in 1957 under mysterious circumstances. Every day Galois receives a continuation of the diary in which Rossi describes in detail his ambivalent relationship to Duplan and his dirty methods. As she reads the diary the film flashes back to black-and-white scenes of Rossis' experiences. Rossi witness torture and public executions, and finds himself torn between wanting peace and disgust at the brutal methods being employed to secure it. Rossi inadvertently reveals information to a friend sympathetic to the rebels which may have led to the murder of a shopkeeper who was providing information to the French army. Ordered by Duplan to command a firing squad, he resolves to disobey his superior's orders. It is revealed he left the diary with the friend with the intended final recipient being his father because he feared for his life. A recent appearance on TV of Col. Duplan prompted his friend to finally deliver the letter to Rossis' father, who, when confronted by Galois readily reveals he has been the one sending the diary and that he committed the murder because Duplan expressed no remorse for his son's murder, Duplan justifying himself by saying Rossi was a traitor. The film ends somewhat ambiguously as Galois, as an army officer, lacks the authority to arrest the elder Rossi, and while driving back from the interview, seems moved by the experience and decides to get lunch with her commanding officer instead of immediately returning to the office.

== Cast ==
- Olivier Gourmet : Colonel Raoul Duplan
- Robinson Stévenin : Lieutenant Guy Rossi
- Cécile de France : Lieutenant Galois
- Charles Aznavour : Father Rossi
- Bruno Solo : Commandant Reidacher
- Eric Caravaca : René Ascensio
- Guillaume Gallienne : The sub-prefect
- Georges Siatidis : Captain Roger
- Thierry Hancisse : Commissaire Quitard
- Jacques Boudet : The Senator-Mayor
- Wladimir Yordanoff : The Chief of Staff
- Bruno Lochet : Schmeck
- Hervé Pauchon : Commandant de Villedieu
- Christophe Rouzaud : General Bibendum
- Philippe Chevallier : The director
- Abdelmalek Kadi : Inspector Belkacem
- Olga Grumberg : Françoise
- Samir Guesmi : Ali
- Ahmed Benaissa : Ben Miloud
- Xavier Maly : Father Jeantet
- Marie Kremer : Thérèse
- Franck Pitiot : Caporal Arnoul
- Alexandre Gavras : Inspector Bayard
- Rabah Loucif : Omar Bouamari
