= Capital (film) =

2012 film by Costa-Gavras

- Film poster
- French: Le capital
- Directed by: Costa-Gavras
- Written by: Karim Boukercha; Costa-Gavras; Jean-Claude Grumberg
- Based on: Le Capital by Stéphane Osmont
- Produced by: Michèle Ray-Gavras
- Starring: Gad Elmaleh; Gabriel Byrne; Natacha Régnier; Céline Sallette; Liya Kebede; Hippolyte Girardot; Daniel Mesguich; Olga Grumberg; Bernard Le Coq
- Cinematography: Éric Gautier
- Edited by: Yannick Kergoat; Yorgos Lamprinos
- Music by: Armand Amar
- Production company: K.G. Productions
- Distributed by: Mars Distribution
- Release dates: 8 September 2012 (TIFF); 14 November 2012 (France)
- Running time: 114 minutes
- Country: France
- Languages: French; English

Capital (French: Le capital) is a 2012 French drama film directed by Costa-Gavras, about ruthless ambition, power struggle, greed and deception in the international world of finance.

== Plot ==
The film follows an executive who is appointed the new CEO of a large French bank, and upsets the bank's board of directors when he begins to take unilateral control of the bank, laying off a large number of employees and making a corrupt deal with the head of an American hedge fund.

== Main cast ==
- Gad Elmaleh as Marc Tourneuil
- Gabriel Byrne as Dittmar Rigule
- Natacha Régnier as Diane Tourneuil
- Céline Sallette as Maud Baron
- Liya Kebede as Nassim
- Hippolyte Girardot as Raphaël Sieg
- Daniel Mesguich as Jack Marmande
- Olga Grumberg as Claude Marmande
- Bernard Le Coq as Antoine de Suze
- Yann Sundberg as Boris Breton
- Claire Nadeau as Marc's mother
- Marie-Christine Adam as Diane's Mother
- Astrid Whettnall as Marilyne Gauthier
- Vincent Nemeth as Alain Faure

== Reception ==
Capital received slightly above average reviews during its initial appearance at various film festivals.

On the review aggregator website Rotten Tomatoes, 56% of 32 critics' reviews are positive. Metacritic, which uses a weighted average, assigned the film a score of 56 out of 100, based on 18 critics, indicating "mixed or average" reviews.

It was the closing film at the Festival international du film indépendant de Bordeaux in Bordeaux, France. It was nominated for the Golden Shell for best film, the Silver Shell for Best Director and the special jury prize at the 2012 San Sebastián International Film Festival and a FIPRESCI prize at the 2012 Toronto International Film Festival.

The film was screened at 36th annual Mill Valley Film Festival on 4 October 2013. Costa-Gavras was present and answered questions at a Q&A conducted by Peter Coyote.

The film was released in cinemas on 14 November 2012.
