= Patrick Blossier =

French cinematographer

- Born: 23 September 1949 (age 76); Paris, France
- Occupation: Cinematographer
- Years active: 1971–present
- Spouse: Mona Achache (–present)

Patrick Blossier (born 23 September 1949) is a French cinematographer. He contributed to more than seventy films since 1976.

== Personal life ==
Blossier converted to Islam to marry French-Moroccan director Mona Achache.

== Selected filmography ==
Year	Title	Notes
1982	The Roaring Forties	
1985	Vagabond	
1987	Miss Mona	Nominated - César Award for Best Cinematography
1987	The Veiled Man	
1987	The Ghost Valley	
1988	Betrayed	
1989	Music Box	
1989	My Nights Are More Beautiful Than Your Days	
1990	A Woman's Revenge	
1991	Out of Life	
1991	Jacquot de Nantes	
1991	My Father the Hero	
1993	Libera me	
1993	The Little Apocalypse	
1994	Revenge of the Musketeers	
1995	Innocent Lies	
1995	L'aube à l'envers	Short
1997	Mad City	
1997	The Chambermaid on the Titanic	Nominated - Goya Award for Best Cinematography
2000	Fidelity	
2002	Amen.	Nominated - César Award for Best Cinematography
2002	Jet Lag	
2003	Father and Sons	
2004	The Light	
2004	Red Lights	
2005	The Axe	
2005	The Moustache	
2006	The Colonel	
2006	Days of Glory	Nominated - Camerimage - Golden Frog - Main Competition; Nominated - César Award for Best Cinematography
2007	Those Who Remain	
2008	The Girl from Monaco	
2009	Eden Is West	
2009	The Hedgehog	
2010	My Father's Guests	
2011	The Monk	
2012-2014	Mafiosa	TV series (16 episodes)
2012-2015	The Returned	TV series (16 episodes)
2014	Les Gazelles	
2018	Bécassine	
