= Franco Solinas =

Italian novelist and screenwriter (1927–1982)

- Born: 19 January 1927; Cagliari, Kingdom of Italy
- Died: 14 September 1982 (aged 55); Fiumicino, Italy
- Occupation: Screenwriter
- Years active: 1951–1982

Franco Solinas (19 January 1927 – 14 September 1982) was an Italian writer and screenwriter. He is best known for the screenplays of The Battle of Algiers, which was nominated for three Academy Awards, and State of Siege. He also wrote the 1969 historical drama ¡Queimada!, starring Marlon Brando. Both films were directed by Gillo Pontecorvo.

Solinas is also credited with writing several notable Zapata westerns, including Tepepa, The Mercenary, A Bullet for the General, and The Big Gundown.
