= Just Before Losing Everything =

2013 short film by Xavier Legrand

- Film poster
- Directed by: Xavier Legrand
- Written by: Xavier Legrand
- Produced by: Xavier Legrand; Alexandre Gavras
- Starring: Léa Drucker
- Cinematography: Nathalie Durand
- Edited by: Yorgos Lamprinos
- Release date: 23 January 2013 (France)
- Running time: 29 minutes
- Country: France
- Language: French

Just Before Losing Everything (original title Avant que de tout perdre) is a 2013 short film by French film maker Xavier Legrand. It was nominated for an Academy Award for Best Live Action Short Film. The film follows the day in the life of a woman who has decided to leave her abusive husband. The story was continued (with the same actors playing the mother, father, and daughter) in Legrand's feature-length follow-up, Custody.

== Plot ==
A small boy (Julien) leaves his house and walks down the street. He runs into his teacher and tells her he is going to pick up cigarettes for his Dad. The teacher reminds him of the teacher conferences tomorrow. The boy walks down the street and goes under a bridge. His mother (Miriam) picks him up. They drive to a bus stop and pick up his crying sister (Josephine).

They drive to Miriam's work at a Wal-Mart like store. She leaves her kids with a co-worker and speaks with her boss. She informs him that she needs to leave tonight. He asks if she is going to file charges against her husband and Miriam states that there is no time. The boss agrees to fire her so she can receive a severance package.

Before they can leave the store, Miriam's husband Antoine comes to talk to her. Julien and Josephine cry and beg her not to talk to him. Miriam changes out of her regular clothes to her store uniform revealing cuts and bruises on her body. He asks for the check book, apparently unaware of Miriam's plan. She gives it to him and walks away.

She and her children leave the store to meet her sister and her sister's husband. They see Antoine in the parking lot and hide from him behind the other cars. He drives away, and they run across the parking lot to Miriam's sister's car.

In the last shot, a car which may or may not be Antoine's turns to follow them.

== Cast ==
- Léa Drucker as Miriam
- Anne Benoît as Gaelle
- Denis Ménochet as Antoine
- Milgan Chatelain as Julien
- Mathilde Auneveux as Josephine
- Émilie Gavois-Kahn as Sylvie

== Accolades ==
Awards
Award	Date of ceremony	Category	Recipients and nominees	Result
Academy Award	2 March 2014	Best Live Action Short Film	Xavier Legrand; Alexandre Gavras	Nominated
Aix-en-Provence International Short Film Festival		Grand Prix Best Short Film	Xavier Legrand	Nominated
Angers European First Film Festival		Audience Award Short Film		Won
Clermont-Ferrand International Short Film Festival		Grand Prix	Xavier Legrand	Won
Grenoble Outdoor Short Film Festival		Best Screenplay	Xavier Legrand (writer)	Won
Leeds International Film Festival		Prix Louis Le Prince		Won
Uppsala International Short Film Festival		Honorable Mention	Xavier Legrand (director)	Won
