= Family Business (1986 film) =

- Theatrical release poster
- Directed by: Costa-Gavras
- Written by: Costa-Gavras (scenario); Francis Ryck (novel)
- Produced by: Michèle Ray-Gavras
- Starring: Johnny Hallyday
- Cinematography: Robert Alazraki
- Edited by: Marie-Sophie Dubus
- Music by: Georges Delerue
- Distributed by: Gaumont Distribution
- Release date: 19 March 1986 (France)
- Running time: 98 minutes
- Country: France
- Language: French
- Box office: $7 million

Family Business (French: Conseil de famille) is a 1986 French comedy film directed by Costa-Gavras.

== Plot ==
A convicted thief just released out of jail begins stealing again to provide for his family. After some successful jobs, he decides to bring his son into the family business.

== Cast ==
- Johnny Hallyday as the father
- Fanny Ardant as the mother
- Guy Marchand as Maximilien Faucon
- Laurent Romor as François as a child
- Rémi Martin as François
- Juliette Rennes as Martine as a child
- Caroline Pochon as Martine
- Ann-Gisel Glass as Sophie
- Fabrice Luchini as the shady lawyer
- Françoise Bette as the sister-in-law
- François Levantal
