= Mondo (film) =

- Directed by: Tony Gatlif
- Screenplay by: Tony Gatlif
- Based on: Mondo by Jean-Marie G. Le Clezio
- Produced by: Michèle Ray-Gavras
- Starring: Ovidiu Balan; Philippe Petite; Pierrette Fesch; Jerry Smith; Schahla Aalam
- Cinematography: Eric Guichard
- Edited by: Nicole D. V. Berckmans
- Music by: Alain Weber
- Production companies: Canal+ Centre National de la Cinématographie (CNC); K.G. Productions
- Distributed by: Canal+ (France); Shadow Distribution (US)
- Release date: 17 April 1996 (France)
- Running time: 80 minutes
- Country: France
- Languages: French, English

Mondo is a 1995 French drama film written and directed by Tony Gatlif based upon the short story by J. M. G. Le Clézio. The film debuted at the Unifrance French Film Festival in Japan 1995, and premiered in France April 17, 1996.

== Background ==
The film's star, Ovidiu Balan, was 11 when the film was shot. He is a Romanian Gypsy who was taken under the director's wing with help of the French government.

Gatlif created the film as a work on the themes of the "restless and free" gypsy, in contrast to the notion of settlements proposed for Sinti and Roma populations in the EU. Unlike similar films about street children, such as Salaam Bombay or Pixote, this film was intended as a fairy tale of sorts of a mythical spirit who touches the lives of outcast people in a society filled with prejudice against the gypsies.

== Synopsis ==
The movie follows an orphan boy surviving in Nice through the kindness of strangers and his own ingenuity. One day Mondo (Ovidiu Balan) appears on the streets of Nice. He has no family, no possessions, no schooling, but shares a brilliant smile and good spirit. Being more at home in the city's gardens, fields, and seashore, the bustle of the city seems to overwhelm him. He has good survival instincts, avoiding police and threatening adults in his search for a family.

== Cast ==
- Ovidiu Balan as Mondo
- Philippe Petit as The Magician
- Pierrette Fesch as Thi Chin
- Jerry Smith as Dadi
- Schahla Aalam as The Magician's Friend
- Maurice Maurin as Giordan the fisherman
- Catherine Brun as Church Soloist
- Ange Gobbi as The Postman
- Jean Ferrier as The Chief of Police
- Marcel Lemuet as The Birdman
- Nadia Cutaia as The Baker Woman
- Pierre Klouman as The Popcorn Man

== Recognition ==
=== Awards and nominations ===
- 1998, Adult's Jury Award Certificate of Merit for 'Feature Film and Video' at Chicago International Children's Film Festival

== Reception ==
Gatlif's earlier film Latcho Drom presented a romantic portrait of Gypsy music and culture. He brings the same sensibility to this lyrical Mondo, a sad-eyed image of the universal outsider, France's most unwanted. Mondo is described to be visually reminding one of those rare days when the world used to sparkle as though it were brand new, set in the streets and docks of the French port city of Nice.
