= State of Siege =

1972 film by Costa-Gavras

State of Siege; État de siège
- Directed by: Costa-Gavras
- Written by: Franco Solinas; Costa-Gavras
- Produced by: Jacques Perrin
- Starring: Yves Montand; Renato Salvatori; O. E. Hasse; Jacques Weber
- Cinematography: Pierre-William Glenn
- Edited by: Françoise Bonnot
- Music by: Mikis Theodorakis
- Distributed by: Valoria Films (France); Constantin Film (Germany)
- Release dates: 30 December 1972 (Germany); 8 February 1973 (France); April 1973 (US)
- Running time: 121 minutes
- Countries: France; Italy; West Germany
- Languages: French; English

State of Siege (French: État de siège) is a 1972 French–Italian–West German political thriller film directed by Costa-Gavras starring Yves Montand and Renato Salvatori. The story is based on the kidnapping and killing of Dan Mitrione, a USAID official, by Uruguayan Tupamaros in 1970.

== Plot ==
After an extensive military and police operation, a body is found shot in a car. The deceased is Philip Michael Santore, an employee of the United States Agency for International Development. Santore, killed by the Tupamaros, is eulogized as an advocate for the poor at his state funeral. A tenacious leftist journalist, Carlos Ducas, wonders why the "communications consultant" Santore was targeted alongside higher-value victims.

In an extended flashback, Tupamaro guerrillas hijack several cars in order to kidnap the second secretary of the American Embassy (who is released), the Consul of Brazil, and Santore. Santore is treated well by his masked captors, who reveal through a calm interrogation that Santore actually worked as a sophisticated instructor of state terrorism and torture to officers of the Uruguayan, Brazilian, and Dominican dictatorships and acted as a liaison with anti-leftist death squads. Despite a massive operation, the Uruguayan military and police are unable to find the captives, and the government refuses a proposed prisoner exchange which would free them in return for the release of political prisoners.

After a large number of Tupamaros are captured by the police and their ultimatum goes unanswered, Santore's captors decide to kill him. Santore agrees, saying he is worth more to the US dead than alive. In the final scene, porters at the airport wryly watch the arrival of a new American official, Santore's replacement.

== Cast ==
- Yves Montand as Philip Michael Santore
- Renato Salvatori as Captain Lopez
- O. E. Hasse as Carlos Ducas
- Jacques Weber as Hugo
- Jean-Luc Bideau as Este
- Maurice Teynac as Minister of Internal Security
- Yvette Etiévant as Woman Senator
- Evangeline Peterson as Mrs. Santore
- Harald Wolff as Minister of Foreign Affairs
- Nemesio Antúnez as President Jorge Pacheco Areco
- Mario Montilles as Assistant Commissioner Fontant
- André Falcon as Deputy Fabbri
- Jacques Perrin as Telephone operator
- Juan Guzmán Tapia as Journalist (uncredited)

== Production ==
Though the setting of State of Siege is never explicitly named, signages throughout the film refer to Montevideo, and the Tupamaros are mentioned by name. Costa-Gavras, living in Paris at the time and preparing his film The Confession, had learned of Mitrione's case in French newspaper Le Monde and decided to make further investigations in Uruguay himself, accompanied by screenwriter Franco Solinas (The Battle of Algiers). The film was shot in Chile during the brief democratic socialist rule of Salvador Allende, just before the 1973 Chilean coup d'état, which Costa-Gavras would dramatise in his later film Missing. Although Allende supported Costa-Gavras' project, the director faced opposition both from Chilean Communist Party members and the conservative mayor of Santiago Province commune Las Condes during filming.

The role of the government's president is played by Chilean painter Nemesio Antúnez.

== Release and reception in the US ==
State of Siege became the subject of controversial discussions upon its US release. Smith Hempstone claimed the film falsely indicted the US and Ernest W. Lefever wrote that it presented a "profoundly fraudulent" portrait of Mitrione. A planned screening during a festival organised by the American Film Institute in the John F. Kennedy Center, Washington, D.C., in April 1973, was cancelled by the AFI's director George Stevens, who argued that the film "rationalizes an act of political assassination". Protesting Stevens' decision, twelve filmmakers, including François Truffaut, withdrew their films from the festival. Writing in the New York Times, John F. Kennedy's former staff member Theodore Sorensen described State of Siege as a simplistic but "important film", which he hoped would awaken viewers from their "slumbering indifference" to Latin America. Mark Danner notes the contradiction between Montand's depiction of Santore as a "highly polished cold war dialectician", which he views as crucial to the film, and Mitrione's rustic character; Danner also states that the film's revolutionary ethics have gone unfulfilled in South America, despite the institutionalization of former leftist guerrillas (e.g. Pepe Mujica) in the region.

For The New Yorker, Pauline Kael wrote that the film was a "political argument on a conscious level" where "the youthful, idealistic Tupamaros and the old fat-cat government men and businessmen are almost cartoons of good and evil." On the review aggregator website Rotten Tomatoes, 78% of 9 critics' reviews are positive.

== Awards ==
- Prix Louis-Delluc 1972
