= Yannick Kergoat =

French film editor

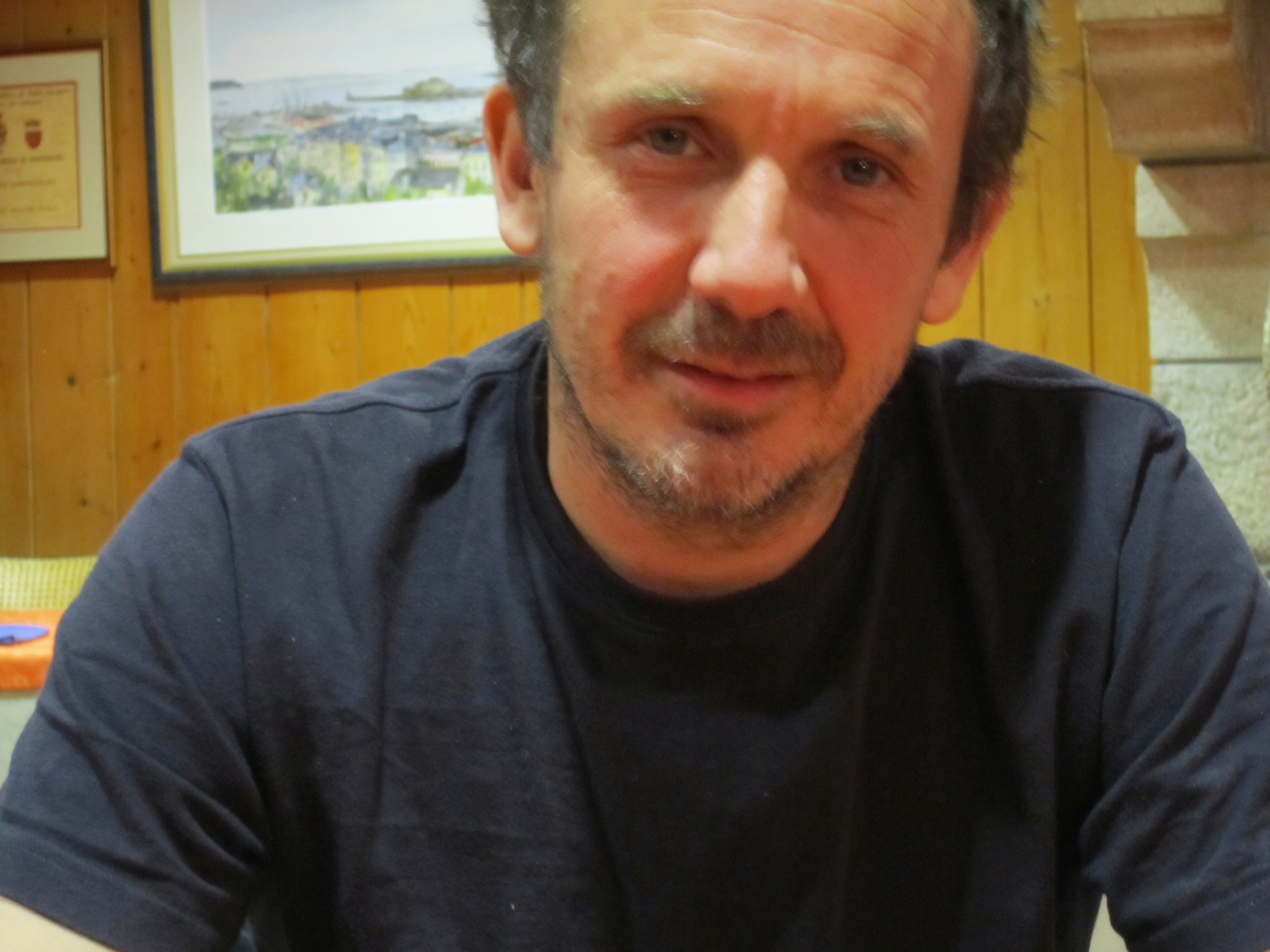
- Yannick Kergoat
- Occupation: Film editor

Yannick Kergoat is a film editor. He has edited such films as Indigènes, Gothika, Not For, or Against (Quite the Contrary) and Le Couperet.

He won a César Award in the Best Editing category for his work on Harry un ami qui vous veut du bien.

== Decorations ==
- Chevalier of the Order of Arts and Letters (2016)
