= Alexandre Gavras =

French film producer (born 1969)

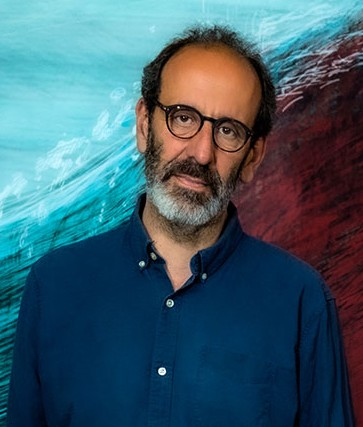
- Born: August 23, 1969 (age 56); Paris, France
- Occupations: Producer, director, screenwriter
- Years active: 1991–present
- Parent(s): Costa-Gavras (father); Michèle Ray-Gavras (mother)
- Relatives: Julie Gavras (sister); Romain Gavras (brother)

Alexandre Gavras (born August 23, 1969) is a French film producer.

== Filmography ==
=== As a director ===
Year	Title	Credit(s)	Notes
1991	The Plant	Direction and screenplay	Short film
1993	Latcho Drom	Assistant director	Documentary
1995	Mondo	Assistant director	
1998	Tueurs de petits poissons	Direction and screenplay	Brest European Short Film Festival: French Grand Prix; Clermont-Ferrand International Short Film Festival: Canal+ Award; Nominated – César Award for Best Short Film; Nominated – Molodist International Film Festival: Best Film Award

=== As a producer ===
Year	Title	Credit(s)	Notes
2012	Capital	Production	
2013	Just Before Losing Everything	Production	César Award for Best Short Film; Nominated – Academy Award for Best Live Action Short Film
2016	Blaise	Production	TV series
2017	Custody	Production	César Award for Best Film; Prix Luigi De Laurentiis
2018	Touiza	Production	Short film
2018	Les Bonnes Conditions	Production	Documentary
2019	Adults in the Room	Production	
2019	Alice	Production	Short film
2021	Les Intranquilles	Production	
