= Jean-Claude Grumberg =

French playwright and author

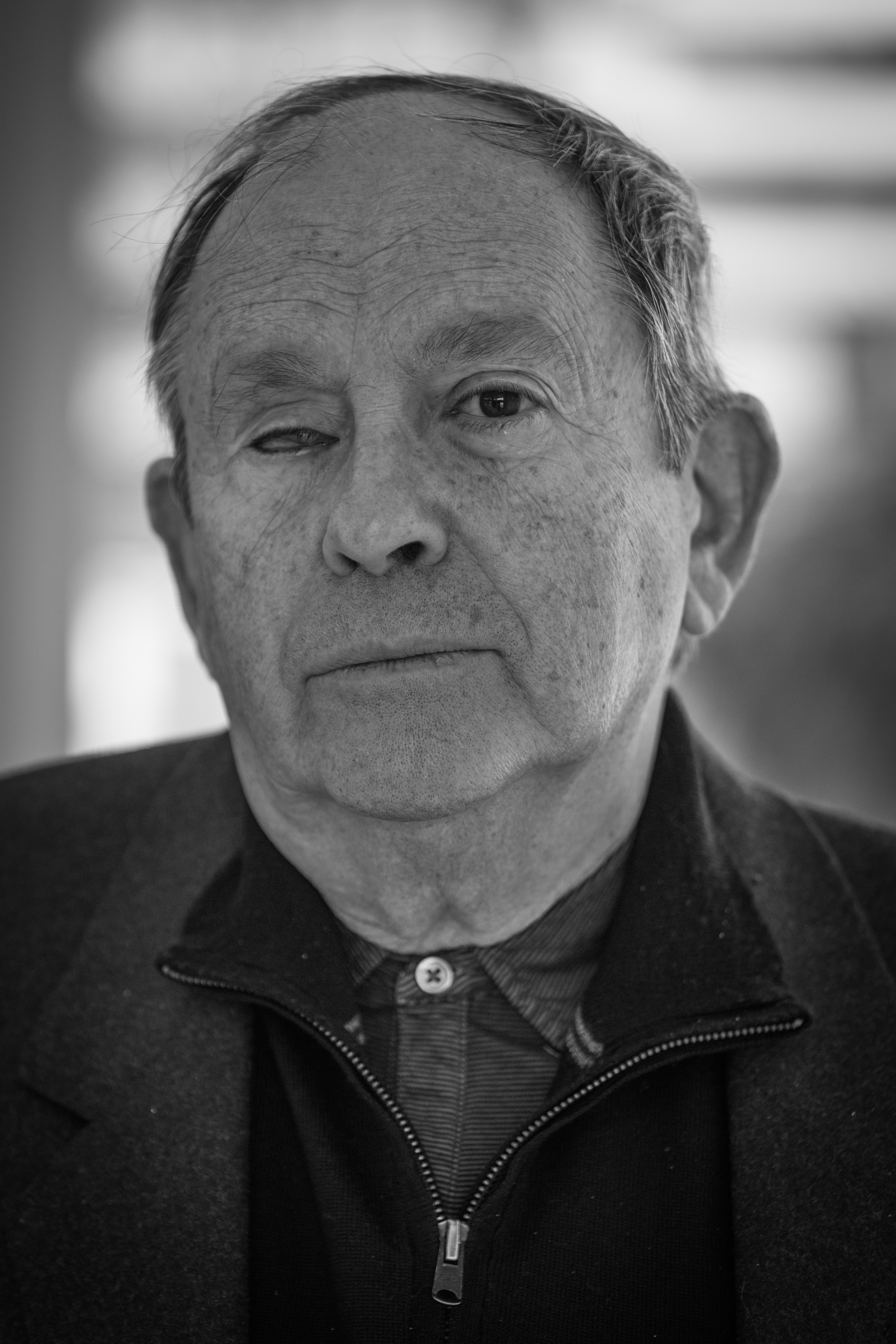
- Jean-Claude Grumberg (November 2013)
- Born: 1939 (age 86–87); France
- Children: Olga Grumberg
- Writing career
- Notable awards: 1999 Molière for best play

Jean-Claude Grumberg (born 1939) is a French playwright and author of children's books.

== Early life ==
Before becoming a playwright, Jean-Claude Grumberg held several jobs, including working as a tailor. This work provided the setting for his best-known play, L'Atelier. He discovered drama as an actor in a theatrical company. His career as a writer began in 1968 with Demain, une fenêtre sur rue, and short theatrical pieces such Rixe, which was staged at the Comédie-Française. In several of his works, he has written about what has haunted him since childhood: the death of his father in the Nazi death camps: Maman revient pauvre orphelin, Dreyfus (1974), L'Atelier (1979) and Zone libre (1990).

After his father and grandparents had been rounded up and deported to Auschwitz in 1942, three-year old Jean-Claude Grumberg and his seven-year old brother, Maxime, were sent by their mother to the Jewish Children's Home in Moissac. The home was run by the Jewish Scouts of France. When the risk of round-ups in the Moissac region became too high for Jewish refugees in 1943, he was hidden with a family in the Vercors region of France.

In 1998, L'Atelier returned to Théâtre Hébertot in Paris, achieved great success, and won the 1999 Molière for best play direction.

His screenplay credits include, Les Années Sandwiches, coauthor with François Truffaut of The Last Metro, La Petite Apocalypse of Costa-Gavras, Le Plus Beau Pays du monde by Marcel Bluwal (1999), Fait d'hiver Robert Enrico (1999). For television, he wrote the teleplays for Thérèse Humbert, Music Hall, by Marcel Bluwal, Les Lendemains qui chantent, by Jacques Fansten et Julien l'apprenti, by Jacques Otmezguine.

He is one of the few living contemporary French playwrights whose work is studied in schools (including L'Atelier). Jean-Claude Grumberg received the Grand Prize of the Académie française in 1991 and SACD Prize in 1999 for lifetime achievement; the Molière's best playwright in 1991 for Zone libre and in 1999 for L'Atelier.

Jean-Claude Grumberg is also the father of the actress Olga Grumberg.

== Actor ==
- 1963: La Grande Oreille by Pierre-Aristide Breal, directed Jacques Fabbri, Théâtre de Paris
- 1964: L'Aquarium d'Aldo Nicolai, directed Jacques Fabbri, Théâtre de Paris
- 1965: La Grande Oreille by Pierre-Aristide Breal, directed Jacques Fabbri, Théâtre de Paris
- 1965: L'Envers d'une conspiration by Alexandre Dumas, directed Jacques Fabbri, Théâtre de Paris
- 1973: En r'venant de l'expo Jean-Claude Grumberg, directed Jean-Pierre Vincent Théâtre Ouvert, Festival d'Avignon Odéon Theatre, Théâtre National de Strasbourg
- 1982: Night and Day by Tom Stoppard, directed Jacques Rosner, House of Culture André Malraux Reims, Nouveau Théâtre de Nice
- 1990: Zone libre by Jean-Claude Grumberg, directed Maurice Benichou Théâtre national de la Colline

== Works ==
Plays

- Sortie au théâtre
- L'Atelier
- Les Vacances
- Rixe
- Les Rouquins
- À qui perd gagne
- Adam et Ève
- Le Duel (after Chekhov)
- Conversation avec mon père
- Amorphe d'Ottenburg
- Linge sale
- Rêver peut-être
- Demain une fenêtre sur rue
- En r'venant d'l'expo
- L'Indien sous Babylone
- Maman revient, pauvre orphelin
- Quatre commémorations
- Dreyfus (1974), interprété par Maurice Chevit et Claude Dauphin
- Zone libre
- Michu
- La Vocation
- Pinok et Barbie
- Marie des grenouilles
- Iq et Ox
- Mon Père. Inventaire
- Une leçon de savoir-vivre
- L'Enfant Do
- Les Courtes
- La Nuit tous les chats sont gris
- Quatre Pièces courtes
- Le Petit Violon
- Chez Pierrot
- Les Autres
- Ca va ?
- Vers Toi Terre promise, Tragédie dentaire
- Moi je crois pas !

Scenarios

- 1970: Too Small Ticky by Eddy Matalon
- 1975: Le Petit Marcel by Jacques Fansten
- 1980: The Last Metro by François Truffaut
- 1988: Les Années Sandwiches by Pierre Boutron
- 1993: La Petite Apocalypse of Costa Gavras
- 1999: Le Plus Beau Pays du monde by Marcel Bluwal
- 1999: Fait d'hiver by Robert Enrico
- 2002: Amen. of Costa Gavras
- 2005: The Axe of Costa Gavras
- 2015: The Art Dealer of François Margolin

Pieces for Children

- Le Petit Violon
- Marie des grenouilles
- Pinok et Barbie
- Iq et Ox
- Le Petit Chaperon Uf
- Mange ta main

Novels'

- 1987: La Nuit tous les chats sont gris, Calmann-Lévy
- 2010: Pleurnichard, Seuil
- 2019: The Most Precious of Cargoes, Seuil

== Awards ==
- Molières
  - 1988 Molière adapter for Death of a Salesman
  - 1991 Molière author for Free zone
  - 1995 Molière adapter for Another Love Story
  - 1998 nomination Molière author for Adam and Eve
  - 1999 Molière author for The Workshop
  - 1999 Molière for best play directory L'Atelier
  - 2002 nomination Molière adapter for Conversations avec mon père
  - 2009 Molière author for To you promised land
- Award Union criticism 1974 (best creation of a play in French), Price of Pleasure SACD and Price's Theater Dreyfus.
- Award Union criticism 1979 (best creation of a play in French) and Ibsen Prize for L'Atelier.
- Award Union criticism 1999 (best creation of a play in French) for Rêver peut-être
- Award Union criticism 2009 (best creation of a play in French) for Vers toi terre promise, tragédie dentaire
- 1991 Grand Prix du Théâtre de l’Académie française for Zone libre
- 1999 SACD Prize for all of his work
- César Awards 2003 César Award for Best Original Screenplay or Adaptation for Amen. of Costa Gavras
