= Alain Weber =

French composer and music educator (1930–2019)

Alain Weber (8 December 1930 — 14 November 2019) was a French composer and music educator.

== Training and activities ==
Born in Château-Thierry, Weber began his studies at the Conservatoire de Paris in 1941. First Grand Prix de Rome in 1952, he won the same year the Sogeda Prize for his ballet Le Petit Jeu. Lecturer at the Conservatoire de Paris since 1957, he taught preparation for the teaching profession, solfège and counterpoint, then in 1970 he assumed the function of professor advisor to studies.

The Grand Prix du disque français was awarded to him in 1982 for his television work La Rivière Perdue. President of many juries, he was also a member of the symphonic commission of the SACEM (1980–83), then of the reading committee of Radio France. He carried out numerous educational missions abroad (Tunisia, Canada, Yugoslavia, Taiwan...). Alain Weber was an officer of the Ordre national du Mérite.

== Technique and aesthetics ==
Weber's work focuses on an exploration of forms of writing that are constantly being renewed. Parallel to some serials works freely treated (Variations pour dixtuor, 1965 - Synecdoque pour hautbois, 1970), he developed a writing in quarter tones (Saxophone Quartet, 1984 - Constellaire, 1994). He also employed various techniques of indeterministic composition, such as certain uses of transparent sheets, which, seen from different angles, generate transformations of pre-established melodic and harmonic propositions (Linear I, II, III, respectively for saxophone and orchestra, for octet, and for sextet of ondes Martenot, 1973–77). Fascinated by poetic forms, he knows how to reconnect with the spirit of the pantoum (Strophes, 1965), and acrostic (Études Acrostiches, 1973), also inspired by the phonemes of Jean Cocteau's Poème de l'Étoile to create a vocal expression in onomatopoeias (Phonèminie, 1983 - Le "Chan" du Potager, 1984). He composed a musical tale for children (Le rusé petit Jean, 1984), but also instrumental works: his pedagogical research led him to use random, a rather flexible technique, assimilable by young performers (Concertante for guitar and guitars, 1993). Each work poses a different musical problem, however, Weber's compositions evolve through a certain unity, never revealing a real break.

== Selected works ==
- Variations (1965), for tentet, piano and percussion, édition Leduc.
- Strophes (1966), for trumpet, string orchestra and percussions, édition Leduc.
- D'Après Wols (1969), 3 watercolours for cello and orchestra, édition Billaudot.
- Synecdoque (1970), for solo oboe, édition Leduc.
- Études Acrostiches en forme de variations (1970), for piano, édition Leduc.
- Epitome (1972), for solo cello, édition Billaudot.
- Linéaire I (1973), for alto saxophone and orchestra, édition Billaudot.
- Projections (1974), for percussion ensemble, édition Leduc.
- Mantra (1974), for oboe and celtic harp, unpublished.
- Ricordarsi (1975), for string ensemble, unpublished.
- Linéaire II (1977), for Octet, unpublished.
- Syllepse (1977), for piano, percussion, ondes Martenot, unpublished.
- La Rivière Perdue (1982), for nine instruments and string orchestra, unpublished.
- Phonèminie (1983), for mixed choir and instrumental ensemble, unpublished.
- Quatuor de saxophones (1984), quarter-tone piece, unpublished.
- Concertante for guitare and guitares (1993), an unpublished work of an educational nature.
- Concert des Mille: "Concerto pour un conservatoire" (1998), for the thousand students performing of the conservatoire à rayonnement régional de Cergy-Pontoise, unpublished.

== Selected discography ==
- Concertino for French horn and orchestra, Disque Magic Horn DC 191110(1), 1958.
- D'après Wols, unpublished ORTF, Barclay 995040, 1969.
- Bruissement, Verseau M.10044, 1979.
- Cantus, Quantum SM 61, 1990.
- Chant de Biwa, BB-Music LC 9161, 1994.
- Musique de chambre, REM 311318, 1998.
- Cadentiel, FDS 57926, 1998.
