= Romain Gavras =

French filmmaker (born 1981)

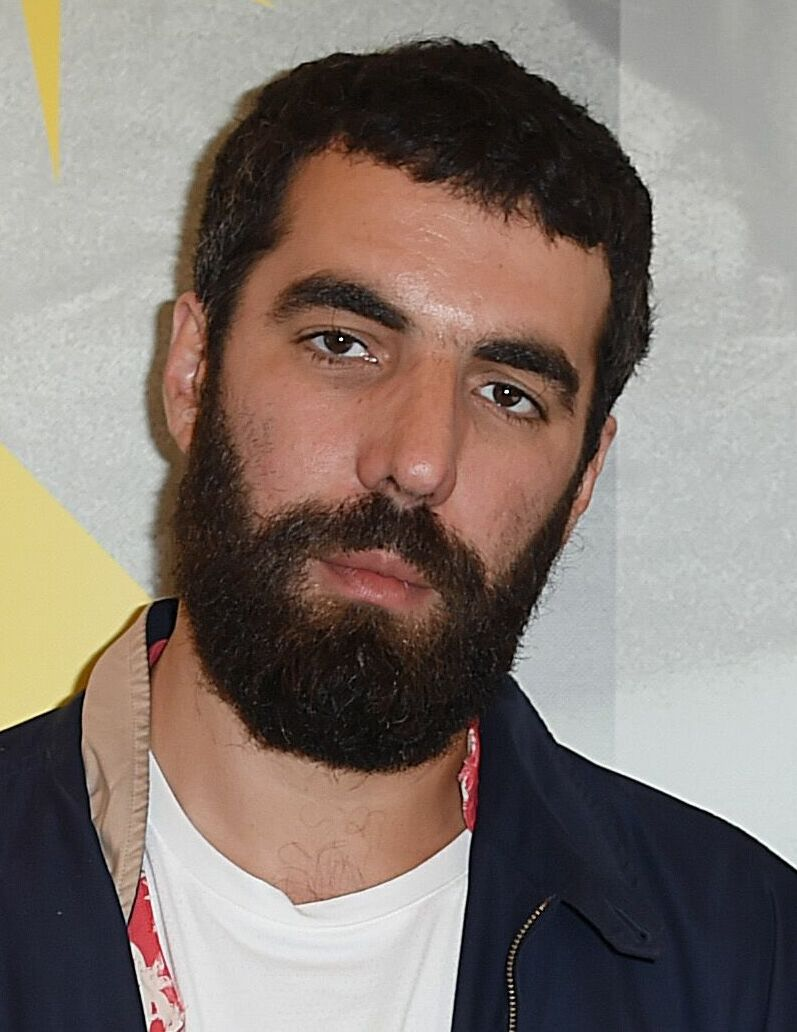
- Gavras in 2018
- Born: 4 July 1981 (age 45); Paris, France
- Occupations: Director; screenwriter
- Years active: 2000–present
- Parents: Costa-Gavras; Michèle Ray-Gavras
- Relatives: Julie Gavras (sister); Alexandre Gavras (brother)

Romain Gavras (French: [ʁɔmɛ̃ ɡavʁas]; born 4 July 1981) is a French film director. He is known for directing M.I.A.'s videos "Bad Girls" and "Born Free", Kanye West and Jay-Z's video "No Church in the Wild" and Jamie xx's video "Gosh". He also directed Justice's "Stress".

His second film The World Is Yours was screened at the Directors' Fortnight during the 2018 Cannes Film Festival. His third film Athena (2022) had its premiere at the 79th Venice International Film Festival. Sacrifice (2025) is the filmmaker's English-language debut.

== Biography ==
Gavras is the son of Greek-French film director Costa-Gavras. He is part of the film group Kourtrajmé with Kim Chapiron, Ladj Ly and Toumani Sangaré.

== Filmography ==
=== Film ===
Year	Title	Notes
2001	The Funk Hunt	Short film
2002	La Barbichette	Short film
2002	Easy Pizza Riderz	Short film
2008	Les Mathématiques du Roi Heenok	Short film
2008	A Cross the Universe	Documentary; Nominated – CPH:DOX Sound & Vision Award
2010	Our Day Will Come (Notre jour viendra)	Nominated – CPH PIX: New Talent Grand Pix; Nominated – SXSW Film Festival Audience Award: Emerging Visions; Nominated – Off Camera International Festival of Independent Cinema: Kraków Film Award
2018	The World Is Yours (Le Monde est à toi)	Nominated – Quinzaine des Réalisateurs: Europa Cinemas Label; Nominated – Quinzaine des Réalisateurs: Art Cinema Award; Nominated – Quinzaine des Réalisateurs: SACD Award
2022	Athena	Nominated – Golden Lion
2025	Sacrifice	

=== Music video ===
Year	Title	Artist
2003	"Pour ceux"	Mafia K1 Fry
2004	"Y'en a des biens"	Didier Super
2007	"Trankillement"	Fatal Bazooka
2007	"I Believe"	Simian Mobile Disco
2007	"Signatune"	DJ Mehdi
2008	"Stress"	Justice
2008	"The Age of the Understatement"	The Last Shadow Puppets
2010	"Born Free"	M.I.A.
2012	"Bad Girls"	M.I.A.
2012	"No Church in the Wild"	Jay-Z and Kanye West
2016	"Gosh"	Jamie xx
2021	"Neo Surf"	Gener8ion and 070 Shake
2026	"Storm"	Gener8ion and Yung Lean

== Personal life ==
Gavras was in a relationship with English singer Rita Ora from 2020 to 2021. In 2023, he dated English singer Dua Lipa. Since February 2026, he has been dating model and actress Emily Ratajkowski.
