= The Little Apocalypse (1993 film) =

1993 film

- Directed by: Costa-Gavras
- Written by: Costa-Gavras; Jean-Claude Grumberg adapted from a novel by Tadeusz Konwicki
- Produced by: Michèle Ray-Gavras
- Starring: André Dussollier
- Cinematography: Patrick Blossier
- Edited by: Joële Van Effenterre
- Music by: Philippe Sarde
- Distributed by: AFMD
- Release date: 10 February 1993
- Running time: 110 minutes
- Country: France
- Language: French
- Box office: $390.000

The Little Apocalypse (French: La petite apocalypse) is a 1993 French comedy film adapted from the novel by Tadeusz Konwicki and directed by Costa-Gavras. It was entered into the 43rd Berlin International Film Festival.

== Plot ==
Stan has been living in the attic apartment of his ex-wife's home, which he shares with a journalist friend. One day, he has an accident which convinces his ex-wife and her current husband that he's suicidal, and they hastily contact a media representative to see if some sort of publicity can't be arranged so that Stan's work can be published and they can benefit, if not from the money, then from their association with him. The organization they contact says that they will be happy to publish his writings, if he will commit suicide live, on television, in St. Peter's square, while the Pope is delivering an address.

== Cast ==
- André Dussollier as Jacques
- Pierre Arditi as Henri
- Jirí Menzel as Stan
- Anna Romantowska as Barbara
- Maurice Bénichou as Arnold
- Henryk Bista as Yanek
- Enzo Scotto Lavina as Luigi
- Jan Tadeusz Stanislawski as Pitchik
- Beata Tyszkiewicz as Madame Pitchik
- Thibault de Montalembert as Arnold's assistant
- Chiara Caselli as Luigi's Daughter
- Jacques Denis as Doctor
- Olga Grumberg as Doctor's assistant
- Carlo Brandt as The kine
