= Adults in the Room =

2019 film by Costa-Gavras

- Greek film poster
- Greek: Ενήλικοι στην αίθουσα
- Directed by: Costa-Gavras
- Written by: Costa-Gavras
- Based on: Adults in the Room by Yanis Varoufakis
- Produced by: Alexandre Gavras; Manos Krezias; Michèle Ray-Gavras
- Cinematography: Giorgos Arvanitis
- Edited by: Costa-Gavras; Lambis Haralambidis
- Music by: Alexandre Desplat
- Production companies: K.G. Productions; Wild Bunch; Elle Driver; France 2 Cinéma; Odeon
- Release date: 31 August 2019 (Venice)
- Running time: 124 minutes
- Countries: France; Greece
- Languages: French; German; English; Greek
- Box office: $1 million

Adults in the Room (Greek: Ενήλικοι στην αίθουσα, romanized: Enílikoi stin aíthousa) is a 2019 French-Greek political film directed by Costa-Gavras. It is based on the book Adults in the Room: My Battle with Europe's Deep Establishment by Yanis Varoufakis about the 2015 Greek bailout. It is Gavras' first feature film that was shot in Greece.

== Plot ==
In 2015, following Syriza's victory in that year's Greek parliamentary election, Minister of Finance Yanis Varoufakis is tasked by Prime Minister Alexis Tsipras to negotiate a new deal on the memorandum of understanding signed by previous government with the Troika in order to avoid facing another inevitable debt crisis in the country months later. However, throughout successive meetings of the Eurogroup, Varoufakis' proposals are only met with flat refusals from the Troika. With constant threats from the European institution of an eviction of Greece from the Eurozone if their demands are not met, Tsipras is forced to sign the MoU, going against the 62% of the population that rejected the bailouts by voting "No" in the 2015 Greek bailout referendum. Varoufakis then resigns, five months after taking office.

== Cast ==
- Christos Loulis: Yanis Varoufakis
- Alexandros Bourdoumis: Alexis Tsipras
- Ulrich Tukur: Wolfgang Schäuble
- Daan Schuurmans: Jeroen Dijsselbloem
- Dimitris Tarloou: Euclide Tsakalotos
- Josiane Pinson: Christine Lagarde
- Valeria Golino: Danae Stratou
- Aurélien Recoing: Pierre Moscovici
- Vincent Nemeth: Michel Sapin
- Francesco Acquaroli: Mario Draghi
- George Lenz: Head of the Troika
- Philip Schurer: George Osborne
- Damien Mougin: Emmanuel Macron
- Alexandros Logothetis: Mános
- Christos Stergioglou: Sákis
- Cornelius Obonya: Wims
- Thanos Tokakis: Yórgos
- Maria Protopappa: Elena
- Themis Panou: Siágas
- Kostas Antalopoulos: press contact for Wolfgang Schäuble
- Skyrah Archer: Eurogroup secretary
- Marina Argyropolo: Fenia
- Georges Corraface: Greek ambassador to France
- Giannis Dalianis
- Adrian Frieling: Lithuanian minister of Finances

== Release ==
The film was selected to play out of competition at the 76th Venice International Film Festival.

== Reception ==
Jessica Kiang of Variety wrote, "Far too many adults, in far too many rooms, have far too many repetitive conversations about the arcane ins-and-outs of EU policymaking in Costa-Gavras’ maddeningly unfocused 'Adults in the Room.'"

Jordan Mintzer of The Hollywood Reporter wrote, "For those interested in how the EU sausage is made — a process that Costa-Gavras mines both for its theatricality and seeming inanity — the film can be a gripping piece of infotainment, even if it runs long at 124 minutes. Others may shy away from so many administrative details, but they will be missing out on a movie that tries to cut through all the red tape and explore the human travails behind the protocols."
