= The Axe (film) =

2005 film by Costa-Gavras

- Original French poster
- French: Le Couperet
- Directed by: Costa-Gavras
- Written by: Jean-Claude Grumberg; Costa-Gavras
- Based on: The Ax by Donald E. Westlake
- Produced by: Michèle Ray-Gavras
- Starring: José Garcia
- Cinematography: Patrick Blossier
- Music by: Armand Amar
- Production companies: K.G. Productions; StudioCanal; France 2 Cinéma; Les Films du Fleuve; RTBF; Wanda Visión
- Distributed by: Mars Distribution (France); Cinéart (Belgium); Wanda Visión (Spain)
- Release dates: 2 March 2005 (France); 9 March 2005 (Belgium); 26 October 2005 (Spain)
- Running time: 162 min
- Countries: France; Belgium; Spain
- Language: French
- Budget: $5.4 million
- Box office: $4.9 million

The Axe (French: Le Couperet, released in the United States as The Ax) is a 2005 black comedy thriller film directed and co-written by Costa-Gavras, and starring José Garcia, Karin Viard and Olivier Gourmet. Based on the 1997 novel The Ax by Donald E. Westlake, the film follows the attempts by a laid-off employee (Garcia) to get back on his feet. He eventually becomes so desperate that he is prepared to kill his job competitors.

The film is a co-production between French, Belgian, and Spanish companies. It was released in France on 2 March 2005, and had a positive response from critics. At the 31st César Awards, the film was nominated for Best Actor (for Garcia) and Best Adapted Screenplay.

== Plot ==
The 39-year-old chemist Bruno Davert has been working at a paper mill for 15 years, improving products and saving money for the shareholders. One day, the company announces that it is forced to "downsize", so 600 staff are laid off and many of their jobs are instead outsourced to a company in Romania. The result is a 16% increase in dividends to the company shareholders.

Bruno was one of the 600 laid off and two years later he has still not been able to find another job, in spite of numerous job applications. He has lost his self-esteem and his family has been forced to give up many of its accepted comforts, such as cable TV and the internet, although his wife Marlène has taken two part-time jobs in order to keep them afloat. Bruno concludes that there is too much competition in his sector for the few jobs available and so in desperation he decides to literally eliminate his competitors, by killing those more qualified than him.

== Cast ==
- José Garcia as Bruno Davert
- Karin Viard as Marlène Davert
- Geordy Monfils as Maxime Davert
- Christa Theret as Betty Davert
- Ulrich Tukur as Gérard Hutchinson
- Olivier Gourmet as Raymond Machefer
- Yvon Back as Etienne Barnet
- Thierry Hancisse as Inspector Kesler
- Olga Grumberg as Iris Thompson
- Catherine Salée as Lydia
- Yolande Moreau as Clerk
- Dieudonné Kabongo as Quinlan Longus
- John Landis as Maxime's friend’s father
- Romain Gavras as civil inspector

== Production ==
Shooting took place principally in Liège, Belgium and Val-d'Oise, France. Photographer Oliviero Toscani created the various billboards scene throughout the film.

== Reception ==
=== Critical response ===
The movie was well received by critics. On the review aggregator website Rotten Tomatoes, 80% of 5 critics' reviews are positive, with an average rating of 7.2/10.

=== Awards and nominations ===
Institution	Year	Category	Nominee	Result
César Awards	2006	Best Actor	José Garcia	Nominated
César Awards	2006	Best Adapted Screenplay	Costa-Gavras, Jean-Claude Grumberg	Nominated
Film by the Sea	2005	Film & Literature Award	Costa-Gavras	Won
Globe de Cristal Awards	2006	Best Actor	José Garcia	Nominated
Gopo Awards	2007	Best European Film	Costa-Gavras	Nominated
Pula Film Festival	2006	Best Film	Costa-Gavras	Nominated
