= Hanna K. =

1983 film by Costa-Gavras

- Theatrical release poster
- Directed by: Costa-Gavras
- Written by: Costa-Gavras; Franco Solinas
- Produced by: Bob Cortez; Edward Lewis
- Starring: Jill Clayburgh; Jean Yanne; Gabriel Byrne; Mohammad Bakri; David Clennon; Oded Kotler
- Cinematography: Ricardo Aronovich
- Edited by: Françoise Bonnot
- Music by: Gabriel Yared
- Production companies: Gaumont; K.G. Productions; Films A2
- Distributed by: Gaumont
- Release date: 7 September 1983
- Running time: 111 minutes
- Countries: Israel; France
- Language: English

Hanna K. is a 1983 drama film directed by Costa-Gavras, starring Jill Clayburgh and Gabriel Byrne. The film was an attempt to depict the Palestinian-Israeli conflict in human terms.

== Plot ==
Hanna K. is the story of Hanna Kaufman, a child of Holocaust survivors and an American-Jewish immigrant to Israel, who is a court-appointed lawyer assigned to defend a Palestinian, Salim Bakri, accused of terrorism and infiltration. Salim claims that he was trying to regain possession of his family house. Hanna saves him from a jail sentence, but he is deported to Jordan. Salim eventually returns, is jailed for illegal immigration, and he again asks for her services. Hanna investigates the story and discovered that Salim's family home is now a tourist attraction in Kafr Rimon, a settlement built and lived in by Russian Jews. Bakri's former village of Kufr Rumaneh has disappeared except for a few stones and trees.

The state's attorneys offer Hanna a deal: if she drops the proceedings, they will arrange for Salim to become a South African citizen, and he can then return to Israel and try to get his property back. Hanna is confronted with the fact that one legacy of the Holocaust was the dispossession of the Palestinians while her colleagues attempt to persuade her of the merits of the arrangement for Salim with the argument that Israel must be "defended" even if Palestinians are denied their rights.

== Cast ==
- Jill Clayburgh as Hanna Kaufman
- Jean Yanne as Victor Bonnet
- Gabriel Byrne as Joshua Herzog
- Mohammad Bakri as Salim Bakri
- David Clennon as Amnon
- Oded Kotler as The Stranger
- Shimon Finkel as Professor Leventhal
- Zinedine Soualem as The Sergeant
- Michal Bat-Adam as Russian women

== Reception ==
Pro-Israeli groups were concerned about the film's sympathetic depiction of the Palestinian issue. An internal memorandum was circulated by B'nai B'rith advising members about arguments which can be made against the film.

Hanna K. opened in several American cities and played for a short time to negative reviews, and then was abruptly pulled from circulation by Universal Pictures the American distributor of the film. Costa Gavras personally advertised the film in The New York Times at a cost of $50,000. Universal forbade him to use ads prepared for the film.

Vincent Canby of The New York Times called it a "large, soggy dud" with ill-drawn characters and "dopey dialogue." Edward Said said in a Village Voice review that "as a political as well as cinematic intervention, then Hanna K. is a statement of a great and, I believe, lasting significance."

== Legacy ==
In her 1986 book Israel and the American National Interest, A Critical Examination Cheryl A. Rubenberg said that the film was a departure from the entertainment industry's traditionally sympathetic stance, as found in films and television docudramas such as Exodus, The Chosen, A Woman Called Golda, and Entebbe.
