= The Confession (1970 film) =

- Directed by: Costa-Gavras
- Written by: Jorge Semprún; Artur London (the book L'aveu)
- Produced by: Robert Dorfmann; Bertrand Javal
- Starring: Yves Montand; Simone Signoret; Gabriele Ferzetti
- Cinematography: Raoul Coutard
- Edited by: Françoise Bonnot
- Music by: Giovanni Fusco
- Distributed by: Paramount Pictures
- Release date: 29 April 1970
- Running time: 139 minutes
- Language: French

The Confession (French: L'aveu) is a 1970 French-Italian film directed by Costa-Gavras starring Yves Montand and Simone Signoret.

It is based on the true story of the Czechoslovak communist committed leftist Artur London, a defendant in the Slánský trial. Gavras stated he 'did not intend the film as an anti-communist film but as a plea against totalitarianism and Stalinism'.

== Plot ==
Artur Ludvik, alias Gerard, is a loyal communist and hero of WWII who serves as the vice-minister of Foreign Affairs of Czechoslovakia in 1951. He realizes he is being watched and followed, and meets to discuss this with a group of his friends who have also attained top government positions. They realize they are all being watched, even the chief of the StB, the very secret police force that is carrying out the surveillance. One day, Artur is arrested and jailed by an organization that declares itself "above the ruling party", and put in solitary confinement for months without being told the reason why. His wife Lise and their children are kept in the dark by the government and told to cooperate for their own good; Lise is later removed from her job as a prominent radio news announcer and forced to work in a factory by the party. Though she believes in her husband, she is equally certain in the wisdom and ultimate goodness of the party.

Through brainwashing techniques, including sleep deprivation and being forced to walk back and forth all the time, Artur is slowly pressured into confessing imaginary crimes, including treason, and baited with the prospect of leniency at sentencing if he cooperates. He also learns that his friends have been arrested as well and are implicating him in crimes against the state. Upon finally confessing to his alleged crimes, Artur is then groomed for a public "trial", which will be broadcast live on radio and shown in cinemas. While his captors coach him to memorize prepared answers by rote, he is given robust meals, vitamin injections, and a sunlamp to improve his appearance after years of wasting.

At the trial, Artur and his colleagues faithfully play their parts. Lise, to her shame, is forced to make a recorded statement disavowing her husband and praising the party which airs during the trial. The prisoners are variously sentenced to either death or life imprisonment, with Artur given the latter. When their interrogators do not return to them, the prisoners panic and threaten to appeal, but are told by their court-appointed lawyers that the sentences are only for the party's benefit and will not be enforced if they do not appeal. The convicted men appear in court one final time to accept their sentences and waive their right to appeal.

Afterwards, Artur and some of his colleagues are gradually freed and rehabilitated between 1956 and 1963. However, the rest are executed and cremated, with their ashes scattered along a road. At the same time, a number of the officials behind the ordeal end up facing their own persecutions, including Kohoutek, Artur's own interrogator. Artur later encounters the demoted Kohoutek, who tries to downplay his role in Artur's torment by claiming he only followed orders and never understood what the party wanted.

In 1968, Artur completes his memoirs of his experiences in captivity and returns to Czechoslovakia to have them published. By then, amidst the Prague Spring, the Stalinist elements who had orchestrated the entire affair had been pushed out of power by the party, and Artur believed that the party now desired to expose the truth of what happened during those years as much as Artur himself did. Unfortunately, he arrives in Prague just as the Warsaw Pact invasion of Czechoslovakia begins.

== Cast ==
- Yves Montand – Artur Ludvik
- Simone Signoret – Lise Ludvik
- Michel Vitold – Smola
- Gabriele Ferzetti – Kohoutek
- Jean Bouise – the factory head
- Marcel Cuvelier – Josef Pavel
- Gérard Darrieu – a policeman
- Gilles Segal
- Henri Marteau
- Jean Lescot – a policeman
- Michel Beaune – the lawyer
- Jacques Rispal
- Michel Robin – the prosecutor
- Georges Aubert – Tonda
- Marc Bonseignour
- Thierry Bosc
- André Cellier
- Monique Chaumette
- Marc Eyraud
- Jean-François Gobbi
- Maurice Jacquemont
- William Jacques
- Guy Mairesse
- François Marthouret
- Umberto Raho
- Laszlo Szabo
- Antoine Vitez

== Production ==
It was during the editing of the film Z — specifically at a Christmas dinner — that Claude Lanzmann spoke to Costa-Gavras about Lise and Artur London, the former Deputy Minister of Foreign Affairs of Czechoslovakia and one of the three survivors of the Prague Trials.

=== Filming ===
Filming for the film took place from September 25, 1969, to December 15, 1969, across the departments of Nord, Pas-de-Calais, Seine-Saint-Denis, and Alpes-Maritimes, specifically in Lille, Roubaix, Arras, Théoule-sur-Mer, and Cannes. It was shot almost entirely in chronological order relative to the film's narrative. Yves Montand lost more than 15 kilograms (33 lb) to play his role in order to effectively portray the physical toll inflicted by the mistreatment suffered by the defendants on screen. Montand had been shaken by the 1956 events in Hungary and later said of the film: "There was in what I inflicted upon myself [for this role] something of an act of expiation."

Many scenes were filmed in Lille, notably on the steps of the Chamber of Commerce and Industry and at the Porte de Paris. The confession scene takes place at the Hospice Général (now the IAE). The New Stock Exchange in Lille stands in for a government ministry in Prague; as Gérard (Yves Montand) exits this administrative building, an old Mongy tramcar can be glimpsed. The driving sequences (featuring a Tatra and a Citroën Traction) were filmed in the streets of Roubaix.

Additional scenes were shot in Croix and Tourcoing (at Clémenceau Park), while the meeting between Gérard (Yves Montand) and his former jailer, Vladimír Kohoutek (Gabriele Ferzetti), takes place on the Grand-Place in Arras.

== Reception and awards ==
=== France ===
The French Communist Party, having recently won the cantonal elections, accused Gavras of turning "a communist book [...] into an anti-communist film." Nevertheless, The Confession, released in April 1970, was a resounding success and became a true political and cultural phenomenon, shaking up its era. The film attracted over two million viewers in France. In December 1976, Jean Kanapa, a theorist of the PCF's distancing itself from Moscow, declared after a screening that the film "should have been financed by the Party" and pleaded ignorance. Yves Montand didn't believe him and had several harsh words for him, while Simone Signoret and Chris Marker (author of a documentary about the making of The Confession) saw his remarks as a sign of change on the part of the PCF. In 1977, Georges Marchais, general secretary of the PCF, remained steadfast in his opinion: "The Confession is an anti-communist film."

Costa-Gavras would later recount that he faced significant pressure during the film's production, with several of the film's crew members and actors urging him not to make the movie: "On set, discussions regarding relations with the USSR or the Communist Party were a constant debate. The film crews included communist technicians—really decent guys—but the moment international or social events heated up, we were suddenly labeled 'enemies of the proletariat'!"

In 1981, following the arrest of two French citizens on the Czechoslovak border, Yves Montand and Artur London met at the Maison de la Mutualité in Paris to declare: "Never Again The Confession" in protest.

=== International ===
Vincent Canby in The New York Times in December 1970 did not consider The Confession a better film than Z (1969), but because the subject of this film "is much more complex, much more human, I find it vastly more interesting". It is "a harrowing film of intellectual and emotional anguish, dramatized by the breathless devices of melodrama." Roger Ebert wrote in April 1971: "It is not a thriller like Z, and it couldn't be, because there is no justice to emerge at the end and no scoundrels to unmask." The director, he wrote, "has made a point of insisting that the movie is anti-Stalinist, not anti-Communist." London remained a communist at the time the film was made. Pauline Kael wrote in The New Yorker that the film is a "thoughtful, intelligent demonstration of how strong, idealistic men of character are turned into pawns of history". Although the film is "subdued, Costa-Gavras's work has tremendous zing, but it's not until the movie is almost over that it gains resonance." On the review aggregator website Rotten Tomatoes, 100% of 8 critics' reviews are positive.

Ronald Bergan and Robyn Karney in the Bloomsbury Foreign Film Guide (1988) wrote: "the screenplay's static and wordy nature is not sufficiently tempered by the direction or the playing. However, some of the interrogation scenes which lead to the false confession of the title cannot fail to have an impact."

The film was nominated for the Golden Globes and BAFTA Awards as Best Foreign Language Film.

In France, the movie contributed to the disillusion of French left intellectuals and artists with the French Communist Party and the Soviet Union. In Germany it inspired the singer-songwriter Reinhard Mey to compose his song In Tyrannis (1972) of which he published with a Dutch (De bekentenis) and a French (Tyrannie) version as well.
