= Music Box (film) =

1989 film by Costa-Gavras

- Theatrical release poster
- Directed by: Costa-Gavras
- Written by: Joe Eszterhas
- Produced by: Irwin Winkler
- Starring: Jessica Lange; Armin Mueller-Stahl; Frederic Forrest; Lukas Haas
- Cinematography: Patrick Blossier
- Edited by: Joële Van Effenterre
- Music by: Philippe Sarde
- Production companies: Carolco Pictures; Irwin Winkler Productions
- Distributed by: Tri-Star Pictures
- Release dates: December 8, 1989 (Beverly Hills); January 19, 1990 (United States)
- Running time: 124 minutes
- Country: United States
- Languages: English; Hungarian
- Budget: $18 million
- Box office: $6.3 million

Music Box is a 1989 American legal thriller film by Costa-Gavras that tells the story of a Hungarian-American immigrant who is accused of having been a war criminal. The plot revolves around his daughter, an attorney, who defends him, and her struggle to uncover the truth.

The film was written by Joe Eszterhas and directed by Costa-Gavras. It stars Jessica Lange, Armin Mueller-Stahl, Frederic Forrest, Donald Moffat and Lukas Haas. The film won the Golden Bear at the 40th Berlin International Film Festival.

It is loosely based on the real life case of John Demjanjuk.

According to Joe Eszterhas's book Hollywood Animal, Eszterhas wrote the screenplay for Music Box almost ten years before learning, at age 45, that his father, Count István Esterházy, had concealed his wartime involvement in Hungary's Fascist and militantly racist Arrow Cross Party. According to Eszterhas, his father "organized book burnings and had cranked out the vilest anti-Semitic propaganda imaginable." After this discovery, he severed all contact with his father, never reconciling before István's death.

Eszterhas had given his father a copy of the script to read before the movie was made, never thinking that his life would soon reflect his art.

== Plot ==
Hungarian immigrant Michael J. Laszlo faces a trial and having his U.S. citizenship revoked after being accused of war crimes during the Second World War. Laszlo insists it is mistaken identity. His daughter, Ann Talbot, a defense attorney, resolves to defend her father in court.

Prosecuting attorney Jack Burke of the Office of Special Investigations claims that the supposedly upstanding and affable family man, Laszlo, is "Mishka," the former commander of an Arrow Cross death squad. During the Siege of Budapest, Mishka's unit sadistically tortured, raped, and murdered scores of Hungarian Jews, Roma, and their Gentile protectors. Meanwhile, Laszlo's bank accounts reveal large payments to Tibor Zoldan, a fellow Hungarian immigrant. Laszlo claims these were unpaid loans to a destitute friend who has been recently killed in a hit-and-run car accident.

At the hearings the few survivors give grisly testimony describing the crimes committed by Mishka's unit. All identify Laszlo as their torturer. Equally damning is an authenticated Arrow Cross identification card bearing Laszlo's photograph and the name, "Laszlo Miklos." Laszlo claims it is a frame-up by Hungary's then Communist government and its secret police, the ÁVO. He further claims it is retaliation for his protest against the US tour of a Hungarian dance troupe several years earlier.

Ann locates a Soviet defector who testifies about the KGB's program of flawlessly forging documents to frame anti-Communists in the West. The defector further explains that this technique was shared with every secret police service in the Soviet Bloc. He says that the Hungarian ÁVO was interested in this tactic. This revelation, combined with Ann questioning the reliability of witnesses still living under a police state, throws Burke's case into serious doubt.

Burke announces a witness will testify that Laszlo is "Mishka". The infirm witness is unable to leave Budapest, so Ann, Burke, and Judge Irwin Silver travel to Hungary. Laszlo refuses to go, claiming Communists will assassinate him if he returns. Before Ann's departure her legal assistant provides more details about Tibor and believes he was blackmailing Laszlo.

In Budapest a mysterious man claiming to be Laszlo's friend visits Ann at her hotel and leaves her a folder of documents. The next day, after hearing the witnesses' damning testimony, Ann produces the documents — signed past affidavits in which witnesses identified three different men as "Mishka".

Judge Silver then dismisses the prosecution's case. A dejected Burke says that, while it is too late to save the victims, it is important to remember what happened to them, and claims Ann is denying the truth. He urges her to visit the bridge where Mishka threw his victims into the Danube River. During this time, the Red Army was storming Berlin and the war was effectively over, yet Hungarians were still massacring Jews. Ann reacts angrily to his suggestion.

As Ann is driven back to her hotel, the taxi crosses the Széchenyi Lánchíd bridge, where Mishka's executions took place. Ann asks the driver to stop, then gets out to view the site. Later, she visits Magda Zoldan, Tibor's sister, who lives in Budapest. Magda mentions that the Chicago Police Department sent her Tibor's wallet. She produces a ticket from a pawn shop taken from it and implores Ann to retrieve whatever Tibor pawned and send it to her. Before leaving, Ann notices a photo of young Tibor with a characteristic scar on his left face; she realises he was Mischka's Arrow Cross partner in the atrocities that the witnesses described.

Back in Chicago, Ann goes to the pawn shop to redeem Tibor's music box. Ann switches it on and, as it plays, old black-and-white photographs slowly emerge from the mechanism. The photos depict a youthful Laszlo in an Arrow Cross uniform sadistically torturing and murdering Jews. Ann, visibly sickened by her father's guilt, accuses him of being Mishka and killing Tibor. Laszlo claims the Communists have poisoned Ann against him.

In the film's climax, Ann tells her father that she never wants herself or her son, Mikey, to see him again. Laszlo says Mikey will never believe her, then goes outside to play with his grandson. Ann composes a letter to Burke and encloses Tibor's photographs and the negatives in the envelope. When the news of Laszlo's suspected war crimes is reported in the news, Ann talks to Mikey about his beloved grandfather.

== Cast ==
- Jessica Lange as Ann Talbot
- Armin Mueller-Stahl as Mike Laszlo
- Frederic Forrest as Jack Burke
- Donald Moffat as Harry Talbot
- Michael Rooker as Karchy Laszlo
- Lukas Haas as Mikey Talbot
- James Zagel (credited as J.S. Block) as Judge Silver
- Cheryl Lynn Bruce as Georgine Wheeler
- Ned Schmidtke as Dean Talbot
- Elżbieta Czyżewska as Melinda Kalman
- Sol Frieder as Istvan Boday
- Magda Szekely Marburg as Judit Halla
- Michael Shillo as Giza Vamos
- Mari Törőcsik as Magda Zoldan

== Production ==
This film marked the second collaboration between director Costa-Gavras and screenwriter Joe Eszterhas after 1988's Betrayed. Both Walter Matthau and Kirk Douglas were in talks with Costa-Gavras to play the part of Mike Laszlo. Ultimately, Gavras selected Armin Mueller-Stahl, who had wanted to work with Gavras since being impressed by his craft after seeing Missing. Mueller-Stahl, an East-German defector, had difficulty obtaining a U.S. visa, as he was suspected of ties to the Stasi.

Jessica Lange, usually a devotée of method acting, chose to approach her character in Music Box differently because "there was nothing in my own experiences of betrayal, disappointment and heartbreak that could compare to the character's." Instead, she "tried to approach it as a child approaches a game of make-believe. I did do some research into the character's Hungarian background and I read a lot of books about the Holocaust but ultimately I relied on my own imagination. There was an ease to working this way, an effortlessness."

Principal photography for the film started on location in Chicago, then moved to Budapest because Gavras wanted authenticity in some of the key Hungarian scenes.

The final moments of the film feature a song by Márta Sebestyén, Mária altatója.

== Critical reception ==
Roger Ebert of the Chicago Sun-Times gave the film a lukewarm two star review. Among his complaints were that the film was "not about guilt or innocence; it is a courtroom thriller, with all of the usual automatic devices like last-minute evidence and surprise witnesses" and that "Nazism is used only as a plot device, as a convenient way to make a man into a monster without having to spend much time convincing us of it." Foremost was his frustration that little attempt was made to understand Mike Laszlo, and that "the old man, who should be the central character if this movie took itself seriously, is only a pawn."

Peter Travers of Rolling Stone was critical of the film, doubting that it existed for any purpose other than to get Jessica Lange an Oscar nomination, bluntly stating that "real-life tragedy has been used to hype cheap melodrama. It's more than offensive; it's vile."

Caryn James of The New York Times applauded Jessica Lange's performance, but had to admit that "Ms. Lange comes as close to inventing a character out of thin air as any screen actor can. Nothing in Joe Eszterhas's overblown script or in Costa-Gavras's simplistic direction begins to support it. In the end, not even Ms. Lange's profuse energy and intelligence can redeem the film's unremitting shallowness and mediocrity." James felt that Music Box "finally tells us nothing about wronged innocence or monstrous evil."

Holocaust survivor and Nobel Peace Prize winner Elie Wiesel was complimentary of the film; according to the New York Times he "found it very moving...a welcome addition to the cinematic literature of the Holocaust." Wiesel stated: "The television series Holocaust was kitsch; this is not. This is a good work of art, a good work of sensitizing viewers."

On Rotten Tomatoes, the film holds a rating of 76% from 21 reviews.

== Awards and nominations ==
- Golden Bear winner at the 40th Berlin International Film Festival
- Academy Award for Best Actress – Jessica Lange (nominee)
- Golden Globe for Best Actress – Jessica Lange (nominee)
- Young Artist Award for Best Young Actor Supporting Role in a Motion Picture – Lukas Haas (nominee)

== See also ==
- List of Holocaust films
- Laszlo Csatary
