= Costa-Gavras =

Greek-French film director (born 1933)

- Κώστας Γαβράς
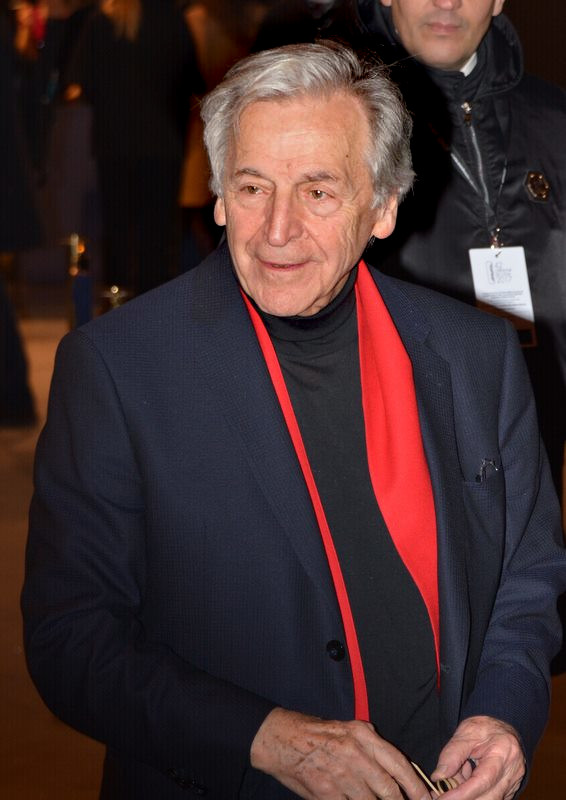
- Costa-Gavras in 2017
- Born: Konstantinos Gavras (Κωνσταντίνος Γαβράς); 12 February 1933 (age 93); Loutra Iraias, Greece
- Education: Institute for Advanced Cinematographic Studies
- Occupation: Filmmaker
- Works: Full list
- Spouse: Michèle Ray (m. 1968)
- Children: Alexandre Gavras; Julie Gavras; Romain Gavras
- Awards: Full list

Konstantinos "Kostas" Gavras (Greek: Κωνσταντίνος "Κώστας" Γαβράς; born 12 February 1933), known professionally as Costa-Gavras, is a Greek-French film director, screenwriter, and producer who lives and works in France. He is known for political films, such as the political thriller Z (1969), which won an Academy Award for Best Foreign Language Film, and Missing (1982), for which he won the Palme d'Or and an Academy Award for Best Adapted Screenplay. Most of his films have been made in French, but six have been in English, including Hanna K.

== Early life ==
Costa-Gavras was born in Loutra Iraias, Arcadia. His family spent the Second World War in a village in the Peloponnese, and moved to Athens after the war. His father had been a member of the Pro-Soviet branch of the Greek Resistance, and was imprisoned during the Greek Civil War. His father's Communist Party membership made it impossible for Costa-Gavras to attend university in Greece or to be granted a visa to the United States, so after high school, he settled in France, where he began studying literature at the Sorbonne in 1951.

== Early career ==
In 1956, he abandoned his university studies to study film at the French national film school, IDHEC. After film school, he apprenticed under Yves Allégret, and became an assistant director for Jean Giono and René Clair. After several further appointments as first assistant director, he directed his first feature film, Compartiment Tueurs, in 1965.

== Selected films ==
His 1967 film Shock Troops (Un homme de trop) was entered into the 5th Moscow International Film Festival.

In Z (1969), an investigating judge, played by Jean-Louis Trintignant, tries to uncover the truth about the murder of a prominent leftist politician, played by Yves Montand, while government officials and the military attempt to cover up their roles. The film is a fictionalised account of the events surrounding the assassination of the Greek politician Grigoris Lambrakis in 1963. It had additional resonance because, at the time of its release, Greece had been ruled for two years by the "Regime of the Colonels". Z won the Oscar for Best Foreign Language Film. Costa-Gavras and co-writer Jorge Semprún won an Edgar Award from the Mystery Writers of America for Best Film Screenplay.

L'Aveu (The Confession, 1970) follows the path of Artur London, a Czechoslovak communist minister falsely arrested and tried for treason and espionage in the Slánský 'show trial' in 1952.

State of Siege (1972) takes place in Uruguay under the civic-military dictatorship of Uruguay in the early 1970s. In a plot loosely based on the case of US police official and alleged torture expert Dan Mitrione, an American embassy official (played by Yves Montand) is kidnapped by the Tupamaros, a radical leftist urban guerilla group, which interrogates him in order to reveal the details of secret American support for repressive regimes in Latin America.

Missing, originally released in 1982 and based on the book The Execution of Charles Horman, concerns an American journalist, Charles Horman (played by John Shea in the film), who disappeared in the 1973 coup d'état led by General Augusto Pinochet in Chile. Horman's father, played by Jack Lemmon, and wife, played by Sissy Spacek, search in vain to determine his fate. Nathaniel Davis, US ambassador to Chile from 1971 to 1973, a version of whose character had been portrayed in the movie (under a different name), filed a US$150 million libel suit, Davis v. Costa-Gavras, 619 F. Supp. 1372 (1985), against the studio and the director, which was eventually dismissed. The film won an Oscar for Best Screenplay Adaptation and the Palme d'Or at the Cannes Film Festival (with Yılmaz Güney's movie Yol).

Betrayed (1988) is roughly based upon the terrorist activities of American neo-Nazi and white supremacist Robert Mathews and his group The Order.

In Music Box (1989), a respected Hungarian immigrant (Armin Mueller-Stahl) is accused of having commanded an Anti-Semitic death squad during World War II. His daughter, a Chicago defence attorney played by Jessica Lange, agrees to defend him at his denaturalization hearing. The film is inspired by the arrest and trial of Ukrainian immigrant John Demjanjuk and screenwriter Joe Eszterhas' realisation that his father had been a member of the Hungarian Arrow Cross Party. The film won the Golden Bear at the 40th Berlin International Film Festival.

La Petite Apocalypse (1993) was entered into the 43rd Berlin International Film Festival. Amen. (2003) was based in part on the highly controversial 1963 play, Der Stellvertreter. Ein christliches Trauerspiel (The Deputy, a Christian Tragedy), by Rolf Hochhuth. The film plot alleges that Pope Pius XII was aware of the plight of the Jews in Nazi concentration camps during World War II, but failed to take public action to publicise or condemn the Holocaust. Gavras won César Award for Best Original Screenplay or Adaptation for this film.

He was president of the Cinémathèque Française from 1982 to 1987, and again from 2007 to 2026.

== Political-commercial film ==
Costa-Gavras is known for merging controversial political issues with the entertainment value of commercial cinema. Law and justice, oppression, legal/illegal violence, and torture are common subjects in his work, especially relevant to his earlier films. Costa-Gavras is an expert in the "statement" picture. In most cases, the targets of Costa-Gavras's work have been right wing or far right movements and regimes, including the Greek military in Z, and right-wing dictatorships that ruled much of Latin America during the height of the Cold War, as in State of Siege and Missing.

In a broader sense, this emphasis continues with Amen. given its focus on the conservative leadership of the Catholic Church during the 1940s. In this political context, L'Aveu (The Confession) provides the exception, dealing as it does with oppression on the part of a Communist regime during the Stalinist period.

== Issues and style ==
Costa-Gavras has brought attention to international issues, some urgent, others merely problematic, and he has done this in the tradition of cinematic storytelling. Z (1969), one of his most well-known works, is an account of the undermining in the 1960s of democratic government in Greece, his homeland and place of birth. The format, however, is a mystery-thriller combination that transforms an uncomfortable history into a fast-paced story. This is a clear example of how he pours politics into plot, "bringing epic conflicts into the sort of personal conflicts we are accustomed to seeing on screen."

His accounts of corruption propagated, in their essence, by European and American powers (Z, State of Siege and Missing) highlight problems buried deep in the structures of these societies, problems which he deems not everyone is comfortable addressing. The approach he adopted in L'Aveu also "subtly invited the audience to a critical look focused on structural issues, delving this time into the opposite Communist bloc."

Until 2019's Adults in the Room, Costa-Gavras had never worked in Greece or made a film in the Greek language.

== Influences ==
When Costa-Gavras was asked about some of his biggest cinematic influences, he replied:

The first movie I saw at the Cinematheque was Erich von Stroheim's Greed, and I was astonished to see you could do long movies with no happy ending. Kurosawa, no doubt, was a big influence. Movies sometimes more than directors have influenced me: The Grapes of Wrath, by John Ford, was an extraordinary discovery. Sergei Eisenstein, of course. Later on, [Ingmar] Bergman.

He also listed René Clément, Jacques Demy, and Gillo Pontecorvo's film The Battle of Algiers as an influence on his filmmaking.

== Legacy and influence ==
Costa-Gavras' films have been a significant influence on political cinema. Wade Major of the Directors Guild of America mentioned that, "With films like Z and Missing, Costa-Gavras almost single-handedly created the modern political thriller". When German Director Wim Wenders paid tribute to him in 2018 at the 31st European Film Awards in Seville, Spain, Wenders called him "One of the greatest filmmakers of our time."

He has influenced directors such as Oliver Stone, William Friedkin, Steven Soderbergh, Rachid Bouchareb, Mathieu Kassovitz, and Ben Affleck.

Stone mentioned that Costa-Gavras "was certainly one of my earliest role models, ... I was a film student at NYU when Z came out, which we studied. Costa actually came over with Yves Montand for a screening and was such a hero to us. He was in the tradition of Gillo Pontecorvo's The Battle of Algiers and was the man in that moment ... it was a European moment."

The American filmmaker William Friedkin listed Z as one of his favourite films and mentioned the film's influence on him when directing his film The French Connection: "After I saw Z, I realized how I could shoot The French Connection. Because he [Costa-Gavras] shot 'Z' like a documentary. It was a fiction film, but it was made like it was actually happening. Like the camera didn't know what was gonna happen next. And that is an induced technique. It looks like he happened upon the scene and captured what was going on as you do in a documentary. My first films were documentaries too. So I understood what he was doing but I never thought you could do that in a feature at that time until I saw Z."

The American filmmaker Steven Soderbergh listed Z as an inspiration on his film Traffic and even stated that he "wanted to make it like [Costa-Gavras's] Z". In 2020, Costa Gavras wrote the preface to the book Opération Condor, by French writer and journalist Pablo Daniel Magee.

The French filmmaker Mathieu Kassovitz listed Costa-Gavras films (such as Z and The Confession) as influential to his work.

The French filmmaker Rachid Bouchareb listed Z as an influence on his film Outside the Law.

The American actor and filmmaker Ben Affleck listed Costa-Gavras's films as influences for his film Argo.

In the television show “Chuck”, season 3 episode 3 “Chuck Versus the Angel de la Muerte” featured the fictional leader Alejandro Goya, who was looking to convert his nation of “Costa Gravis” from communism to democracy. Alejandro’s wife and one of his bodyguards attempt to undermine this effort, seemingly a reference to Costa-Gavras’ movie “Z”.

== Accolades ==
Costa-Gavras's debut film, Compartiment Tueurs, won National Board of Review Award for Best Foreign Language Film and was nominated for the Edgar Award for Best Screenplay in 1967.

The film Z was the first film to be nominated for both the Best Picture and Best Foreign Language Film. It won the latter, as well as the Jury Prize at the Cannes Film Festival, and the Golden Globe Award for Best Foreign Film. Z was also the first foreign-language film to win the Best Film award from the New York Film Critics Circle. Gavras won the Best Director award as well.

Costa-Gavras received an honorary doctorate from the Film School of the Aristotle University in 2013.

He was interviewed extensively by The Times cultural correspondent Melinda Camber Porter and was featured prominently in her book Through Parisian Eyes: Reflections on Contemporary French Arts and Culture (1993, Da Capo Press).

Costa-Gavras received the Magritte Honorary Award in 2013. He was the first filmmaker to receive the Catalonia International Prize (2017).

== Personal life ==
His wife Michèle Ray-Gavras is a film producer and journalist, and his daughter Julie Gavras and his sons Romain Gavras and Alexandre Gavras are also directors. He is the first cousin of Penelope Spheeris, Jimmie Spheeris and Chris Spheeris.

In 2009, Costa-Gavras signed a petition in support of film director Roman Polanski, calling for his release after Polanski was arrested in Switzerland in relation to his 1977 charge for drugging and raping a 13-year-old girl. He argued that "the crime could not be considered rape because the teenage girl was 13 years old but looked 25".

== Filmography ==
=== Films ===
Year	English title	Director	Writer	Producer	Original title
1965	The Sleeping Car Murders	Yes	Yes	No	Compartiment tueurs
1967	Shock Troops	Yes	Yes	Yes	Un homme de trop
1969	Z	Yes	Yes	No	Z
1970	The Confession	Yes	No	No	L'Aveu
1972	State of Siege	Yes	Yes	No	État de siège
1975	Special Section	Yes	Yes	Yes	Section spéciale
1979	Womanlight	Yes	Yes	No	Clair de femme
1982	Missing	Yes	Yes	No	Missing.
1983	Hanna K.	Yes	Yes	No	Hanna K.
1986	Family Business	Yes	Yes	No	Conseil de famille
1988	Betrayed	Yes	No	No	Betrayed
1989	Music Box	Yes	No	No	Music Box
1993	The Little Apocalypse	Yes	Yes	No	La Petite Apocalypse
1997	Mad City	Yes	No	No	Mad City
2002	Amen.	Yes	Yes	No	Amen.
2005	The Axe	Yes	Yes	No	Le Couperet
2006	The Colonel	No	Yes	Yes	Mon colonel
2009	Eden Is West	Yes	Yes	Yes	Eden à l'ouest
2012	Capital	Yes	Yes	No	Le Capital
2019	Adults in the Room	Yes	Yes	No	Ενήλικοι στην Αίθουσα
2024	Last Breath	Yes	Yes	No	Le dernier souffle
