= Amen. =

2002 film by Costa-Gavras

- French theatrical release poster
- Directed by: Costa-Gavras
- Written by: Jean-Claude Grumberg; Costa-Gavras
- Based on: The Deputy by Rolf Hochhuth
- Produced by: Andrei Boncea
- Starring: Ulrich Tukur; Mathieu Kassovitz; Ion Caramitru; Marcel Iureş
- Cinematography: Patrick Blossier
- Edited by: Yannick Kergoat
- Music by: Armand Amar
- Production company: Canal+; K.G. Productions; KC Medien; Renn Productions; TF1
- Distributed by: Pathé (France); Concorde Filmverleih (Germany)
- Release date: 2002
- Running time: 132 minutes
- Countries: France; Germany; Romania
- Language: English
- Budget: €15,700,000
- Box office: €11,217,610 (France)

Amen. is a 2002 English-language historical war drama film directed and co-written by Costa-Gavras. Based on Rolf Hochhuth's 1963 play The Deputy, the film examines the political and diplomatic relationship between the Vatican and Nazi Germany during World War II. It stars Ulrich Tukur, Mathieu Kassovitz, Sebastian Koch, Ulrich Mühe, Ion Caramitru, and Marcel Iureş. It was a co-production between French, German, and Romanian studios.

The film premiered at the 52nd Berlin International Film Festival, where it was nominated for the Golden Bear. It was nominated for seven César Awards, including for Best Film and Best Director, and won the award for Best Original Screenplay or Adaptation (Costa-Gavras and Jean-Claude Grumberg).

== Plot ==
During World War II, Kurt Gerstein, a Waffen-SS officer employed in the SS Hygiene Institute, designs programs for the purification of water and the destruction of vermin. He is shocked to learn that the process he has developed to eradicate typhus, by using a hydrogen cyanide mixture called Zyklon B, is now being used for killing Jews and other "undesirables" in extermination camps. Gerstein attempts to notify Pope Pius XII about the gassings, but is appalled by the lack of response he gets from the Catholic hierarchy. The only person moved is Riccardo Fontana, a young Jesuit priest. Fontana and Gerstein attempt to raise awareness about what is happening to the Jews in Europe but even after Fontana appealing to the pope himself, the Vatican makes only a timid and vague condemnation of Hitler and Nazi Germany.

Eventually Gerstein travels to Rome to speak to the Pope himself but is not allowed. When he arrives the Germans are taking control of Rome and begin rounding up the Italian Jews to be sent to the death camps. Fontana begs the Pope to force the Germans to stop the deportation by appearing at the train station in person but the Pope refuses, saying that doing so will cause hardship for the Christians living under Nazi Germany. In disgust and sorrow Fontana puts the Jewish Star-of- David yellow badge on himself and presents himself to be taken on the train of Jews being deported to the death camps. When he arrives at the camp Fontana is interrogated by the head of the camp, a powerful 'friend' of Kurt Gerstein known simply as the Doctor, who despite knowing that the war is lost and that Fontana is a Catholic priest, allows Fontana to stay with the Jews and work in the crematorium, and eventually orders him gassed.

Gerstein attempts to save Fontana but he will not leave. The Doctor escorts Gerstein out of the camp as Fontana and the remaining Jews continue to be murdered. They drive by German soldiers digging up and burning the bodies of previously murdered Jews in a mass grave near the camp, and the Doctor asks Gerstein if he knows any contacts to help get him out of Germany. Gerstein returns home and gathers all his evidence that documents the Nazi atrocities and takes them to the Allies. Despite accepting his evidence he is still arrested and after reading the charges against him he is found hanged in his cell. Afterward the Doctor is seen speaking to a Cardinal in Rome asking for help leaving the country saying "I'm a doctor, just a physician" and the cardinal agrees to help send him to Argentina.

== Cast ==
- Ulrich Tukur as Kurt Gerstein
- Mathieu Kassovitz as Riccardo Fontana
- Ulrich Mühe as The Doctor
- Michel Duchaussoy as The Cardinal
- Ion Caramitru as Conte Fontana
- Marcel Iureş as Pope Pius XII
- Friedrich von Thun as Ludwig Gerstein
- Antje Schmidt as Elfriede Gerstein
- Hanns Zischler as Ernst-Robert Grawitz
- Sebastian Koch as Rudolf Höss
- Erich Hallhuber as Von Rutta
- Angus MacInnes as Tittman
- Bernd Fischerauer as Bishop von Galen
- Pierre Franckh as Pastor Wehr
- Richard Durden as Ambassador Taylor
- Monica Bleibtreu as Mrs. Hinze
- Justus von Dohnányi as Göran von Otter
- Günther Maria Halmer as F. K. Otto Dibelius
- August Zirner as Ernst von Weizsäcker
- Horațiu Mălăele as Hans Fritzsche
- Ovidiu Cuncea as Štefan Lux
- Markus Hering as Karl
- Susanne Lothar as Alexandra Baltz
- Alex Geringas as Helmut Franz
- Theodor Danetti as Old Cardinal
- Marina Berti as La Principessa
- Michael Mendl as Alois Hudal

== Production ==
The film is based on a 1963 play by Rolf Hochhuth, The Deputy, a Christian Tragedy, which was widely attacked in Catholic and Jewish circles for its portrayal of Pope Pius XII. The German-language version of the film was released under the play's original title Der Stellvertreter.

Since the Holy See did not allow filming in the Vatican, the scenes in the papal palaces were shot in the Palace of the Parliament of Bucharest, Romania.

== Reception ==
On the review aggregator website Rotten Tomatoes, 67% of 49 critics' reviews are positive. The website's consensus reads: "Amen loses some of its impact to a protracted running time and deliberate pace, but Ulrich Tukur's powerful performance helps bring the story's worthy themes to life." Metacritic, which uses a weighted average, assigned the film a score of 57 out of 100, based on 19 critics, indicating "mixed or average" reviews.

== See also ==
- List of Holocaust films
