= RiverRun International Film Festival =

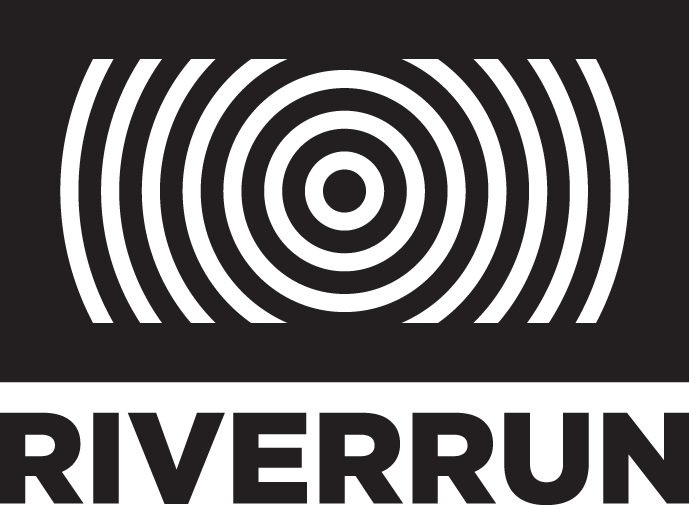
RiverRun official logo

The RiverRun International Film Festival is an annual Oscar-qualifying film festival held each spring in Winston-Salem, North Carolina, United States. The festival is a 501(c)3 non-profit organization and presents a variety of feature-length and short films from all genres, and also presents special events, regional premieres of significant films, celebrity tributes, family events and classic retrospectives as well as panel discussions and parties.

== Jury awards ==
=== Best Narrative Feature ===
Year	Film	Country	Director
2024	Banel & Adama	Senegal	Ramata-Toulaye Sy
2023	Trapped Balloon	Japan	Hiroyuki Miyagawa
2022	You Resemble Me	France / Egypt	Dina Amer
2021	Fires in the Dark	France / Belgium	Dominique Lienhard
2020	De Lo Mio	United States	Diana Peralta
2019	Alice	Australia/France	Josephine Mackerras
2018	Angels Wear White	China	Vivian Qu
2017	After Love	France / Belgium	Joachim Lafosse
2016	The Fits	United States	Anna Rose Holmer
2015	Memories on Stone	Iraq / Germany	Shawkat Amin Korki
2014	Ida	Poland	Paweł Pawlikowski
2013	In the House	France	François Ozon
2012	Found Memories	Argentina / Brazil	Júlia Murat
2011	Bal (Honey)	Turkey / Germany	Semih Kaplanoglu
2010	Katalin Varga	Romania / United Kingdom	Peter Strickland
2009	Three Monkeys	Turkey / France / Germany	Nuri Bilge Ceylan
2008	The Edge of Heaven	Germany / Turkey	Fatih Akin
2007	For the Living and the Dead	Finland	Kari Paljakka
2006	A Wonderful Night in Split	Croatia	Arsen Anton Ostojić
2005	Innocent Voices	Mexico	Luis Mandoki
2004	Dandelion	United States	Mark Milgard
2003	The Truth... Yathharth	India	Rajesh Sheth
2001	Morning ( >$500k budget )	United States	Ami Canaan Mann
2001	Dischord ( <$500k budget )	United States	Mark Wilkinson
2000	The Magic of Marciano ( >$500k budget )	United States	Tony Barbieri
2000	Jacks or Better ( <$500k budget )	United States	Robert Sidney Mellette
1999	Crashing Eden	United States	Dean Alioto
1998	The Legend of Cryin' Ryan	United States	Deanna Shapiro & Julie Smith (St.Claire)

=== Best Documentary Feature ===
Year	Film	Country	Director
2024	Name Me Lawand	UK	Edward Lovelace
2023	Bad Press	US	Rebecca Landsberry-Baker & Joe Peeler
2022	Art & Krimes by Krimes	US	Alysa Nahmias
2021	Sapelo	Switzerland	Nick Brandestini
2020	I Am Not Alone	Armenia / United States	Garin Hovannisian
2019	American Factory	United States	Steven Bognar & Julia Reichert
2018	Minding the Gap	United States	Bing Liu
2017	Quest	United States	Jonathan Olshefski
2016	Salero	Bolivia / United States	Mike Plunkett
2015	The Chinese Mayor	China	Hao Zhou
2014	The Case Against 8	United States	Ben Cotner & Ryan White
2013	I Am Breathing	Denmark / United Kingdom	Emma Davie & Morgan McKinnon
2012	The Boy Who Was a King	Bulgaria/Germany	Andrey Paounov
2011	Armadillo	Denmark	Janus Metz
2010	Last Train Home	Canada / China / UK	Lixin Fan
2009	Unmistaken Child	Israel	Nati Baratz
2008	Up the Yangtze	Canada	Yung Chang
2007	The Rape of Europa	USA	Richard Berge, Bonni Cohen, and Nicole Newnham
2006	Taimagura Grandma	Japan	Yohihiko Sumikawa
2005	Parallel Lines	United States	Nina Davenport
2004	Long Gone	United States	Jack Cahill & David Eberhardt
2003	The Boys of Second Street Park	United States	Ron Berger & Dan Klores
2001	Company Jasmine	Israel	Yael Katzir & Dan Katzir

=== Best Director ===
Year	Film	Country	Director
2024	The Featherweight	US	Robert Kolodny
2023	Know Your Place	US	Zia Mohajerjasbi
2022	The Falconer	Oman	Adam Sjöberg & Seanne Winslow
2021	Fires in the Dark	France	Dominique Lienhard
2020	Asymmetry	Serbia	Maša Nešković
2019	Alice	Australia	Josephine Mackerras
2018	Angels Wear White	China	Vivian Qu
2017	The Ornithologist	Brazil	João Pedro Rodrigues
2016	One Floor Below	Romania	Radu Muntean
2015	Still the Water	Japan	Naomi Kawase
2014	The Summer of Flying	Chile	Marcela Said
2013	La Sirga	Colombia	William Vega
2012	Found Memories	Argentina	Júlia Murat
2011	Uncle Boonmee Who Can Recall His Past Lives	Thailand	Apichatpong Weerasethakul
2010	Dogtooth	Greece	Yorgos Lanthimos
2009	Il Divo	Italy	Paolo Sorrentino
2008	California Dreamin’	Romania	Cristian Nemescu
2007	Son of Man	South Africa	Mark Dornford-May
2006	A Wonderful Night In Split	Croatia	Arsen Anton Ostojic
2005	Symmetry	Poland	Konrad Niewolski
2008	Long Gone	US	Jack Cahill and David Eberhardt
2008	Manhood	US	Bobby Roth

== History ==
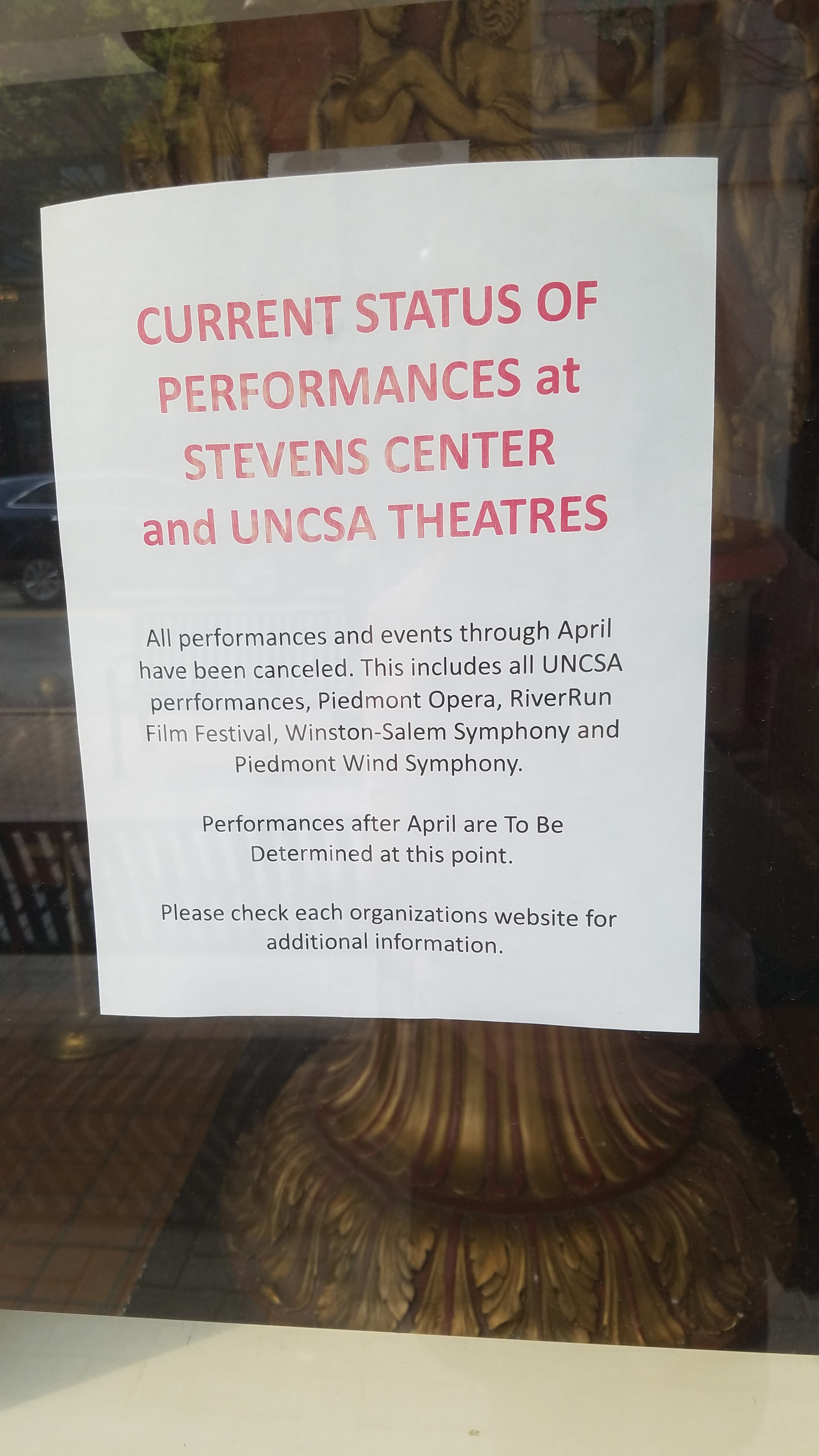
A sign about the closure and cancellation of various events

Founded in 1998 by Gennaro D'Onofrio, Vincent D'Onofrio, and Elizabeth D'Onofrio, the RiverRun International Film Festival got its name from the French Broad River near Brevard, North Carolina, where the festival was originally held. In 2003, Dale Pollock, a former film producer and then-Dean of the School of Filmmaking at the University of North Carolina School of the Arts, moved RiverRun to Winston-Salem, where it resides today as an independent arts organization showing new films from independent, international and student filmmakers.

Since 2014, the festival has been an Oscar-qualifying festival in the Animated short film category.

=== Festival dates and locations ===
Number	Year	Dates	Location
1st	1998	September 25-27	Brevard, North Carolina
2nd	1999	September	Brevard, North Carolina
3rd	2000	September 1-4	Brevard, North Carolina
4th	2001	August 29 - September 3	Brevard, North Carolina
	2002	skipped	
5th	2003	April 24–27	Winston-Salem, North Carolina
6th	2004	April 22–25	Winston-Salem, North Carolina
7th	2005	April 21–24	Winston-Salem, North Carolina
8th	2006	March 16–19	Winston-Salem, North Carolina
9th	2007	April 18–23	Winston-Salem, North Carolina
10th	2008	April 23–28	Winston-Salem, North Carolina
11th	2009	April 22–29	Winston-Salem, North Carolina
12th	2010	April 15–25	Winston-Salem, North Carolina
13th	2011	April 8–17	Winston-Salem, North Carolina
14th	2012	April 13–22	Winston-Salem, North Carolina
17th	2015	April 16–26	Winston-Salem, North Carolina
20th	2018	April 19–29	Winston-Salem, North Carolina
21st	2019	April 4–14	Winston-Salem, North Carolina
22nd	2020	March 26 - April 5 (Note: Original dates for the festival before it was postponed due to the COVID-19 pandemic.)	Winston-Salem, North Carolina
