= 67th Berlin International Film Festival =

2017 film festival in Berlin, Germany

- Festival poster
- Opening film: Django
- Closing film: On Body and Soul
- Location: Berlin, Germany
- Founded: 1951
- Awards: Golden Bear: On Body and Soul
- Festival date: 9–18 February 2017
- Website: www.berlinale.de

Berlin International Film Festival chronology
- 68th 66th

The 67th annual Berlin International Film Festival was held from 9 to 18 February 2017 with Dutch filmmaker Paul Verhoeven as president of the jury.

Django, directed by Etienne Comar, opened the festival. The Golden Bear was awarded to the Hungarian film On Body and Soul directed by Ildikó Enyedi, which also served as closing film of the festival.

== Juries ==
=== Main Competition ===
- Paul Verhoeven, Dutch filmmaker - Jury President
- Olafur Eliasson, Icelandic sculptor
- Dora Bouchoucha Fourati, Tunisian producer
- Maggie Gyllenhaal, American actress
- Julia Jentsch, German actress
- Diego Luna, Mexican actor and filmmaker
- Wang Quan'an, Chinese filmmaker

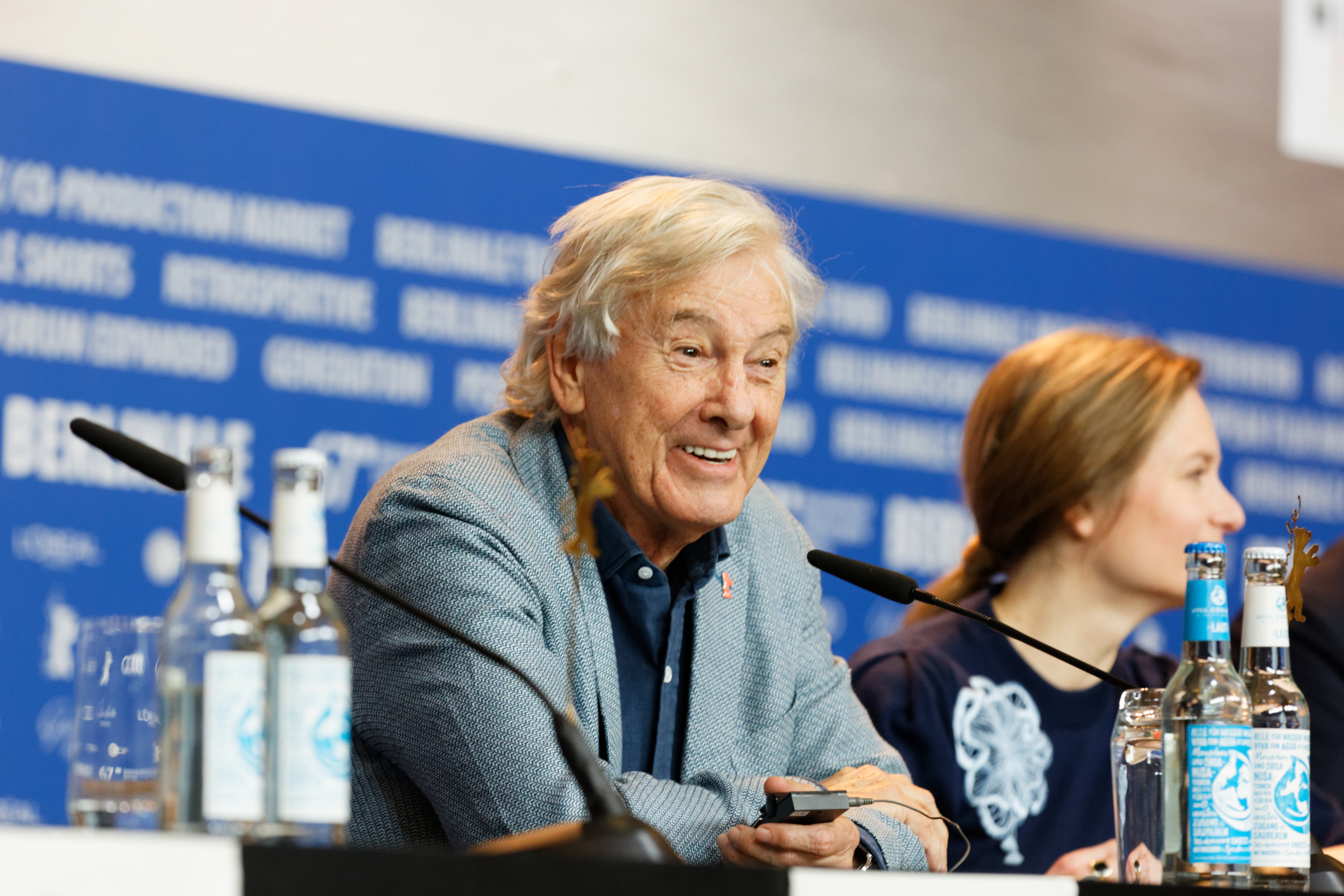
Paul Verhoeven at a press conference at Berlinale 2017

=== Best First Feature Award ===
- Jayro Bustamante, Guatemalan filmmaker
- Clotilde Courau, French actress (France)
- Mahmoud Sabbagh, Saudi filmmaker, producer, and writer

=== Documentary Award ===
- Daniela Michel, Mexican film critic
- Laura Poitras, American filmmaker and producer
- Samir, Iraqi director and producer

=== Short Film Competition ===
- Kimberley Drew, American writer, curator and social media manager
- Christian Jankowski, German artist and filmmaker
- Carlos Nuñez, Chilean film producer

== Official Section ==
=== Main Competition ===
The following films were selected for the main competition for the Golden Bear and Silver Bear awards:

English title	Original title	Director(s)	Production country/region
Ana, mon amour		Călin Peter Netzer	Romania, Germany, France
Beuys		Andres Veiel	Germany
Bright Nights	Helle Nächte	Thomas Arslan	Germany, Norway
Colo		Teresa Villaverde	Portugal, France
The Dinner		Oren Moverman	United States
Django		Étienne Comar	France
A Fantastic Woman	Una mujer fantástica	Sebastián Lelio	Chile, Germany, United States, Spain
Félicité		Alain Gomis	France, Senegal, Belgium, Germany, Lebanon
Have a Nice Day	好极了	Liu Jian	China
Joaquim		Marcelo Gomes	Brazil, Portugal
Mr. Long	ミスター・ロン/ 龍先生	Sabu	Japan, Hong Kong, Germany, China, Taiwan
On Body and Soul	Testről és lélekről	Ildikó Enyedi	Hungary
On the Beach at Night Alone	밤의 해변에서 혼자	Hong Sang-soo	South Korea
The Other Side of Hope	Toivon tuolla puolen	Aki Kaurismäki	Finland
The Party		Sally Potter	United Kingdom
Return to Montauk	Rückkehr nach Montauk	Volker Schlöndorff	Germany, France, Ireland
Spoor	Pokot	Agnieszka Holland	Poland, Germany, Czech Republic, Sweden, Slovakia, France
Wild Mouse	Wilde Maus	Josef Hader	Austria

=== Out of competition ===
The following films were selected to be screened out of competition:

English title	Original title	Director(s)	Production country/region
The Bar	El Bar	Álex de la Iglesia	Spain
Final Portrait		Stanley Tucci	United Kingdom
Logan		James Mangold	United States
The Midwife	Sage femme	Martin Provost	France
T2 Trainspotting		Danny Boyle	United Kingdom
Viceroy's House		Gurinder Chadha	India, United Kingdom

=== Panorama ===
The following films were selected for the Panorama section:

English title	Original title	Director(s)	Production country/region
1945		Ferenc Török	Hungary
Berlin Syndrome		Cate Shortland	Australia, France
Call Me by Your Name		Luca Guadagnino	United States, Brazil, Italy, France
Centaur		Aktan Abdykalykov	Kyrgyzstan, France, Germany, Netherlands
Ciao Ciao	巧巧	Song Chuan	China, France
Close-Knit	彼らが本気で編むときは、	Naoko Ogigami	Japan
Discreet		Travis Mathews	United States
Fluidø		Shu Lea Cheang	Germany
From the Balcony	Fra balkongen	Ole Giæver	Norway
Ghost in the Mountains	空山异客	Yang Heng	China
God's Own Country		Francis Lee	United Kingdom
Headbang Lullaby		Hicham Lasri	Morocco, France, Qatar, Lebanon
Honeygiver Among the Dogs		Dechen Roder	Bhutan
Hostages		Rezo Gigineishvili	Georgia, Russia, Poland
Inflame	Kaygı	Ceylan Özgün Özçelik	Turkey
Insyriated		Philippe Van Leeuw	Belgium, France, Lebanon
Just Like Our Parents	Como Nossos Pais	Laís Bodanzky	Brazil
The King's Choice	Kongens Nei	Erik Poppe	Norway, Sweden, Denmark, Ireland
The Misandrists		Bruce LaBruce	Germany
One Thousand Ropes		Tusi Tamasese	New Zealand
Pendular		Júlia Murat	Brazil, Argentina, France
Requiem for Mrs. J.	Rekvijem za gospodju J.	Bojan Vuletić	Serbia, Bulgaria, Macedonia, Russia, France, Germany
Skins	Pieles	Eduardo Casanova	Spain
The Taste of Betel Nut	槟榔血	Hu Jia	China, Hong Kong
Tiger Girl		Jakob Lass	Germany
Vaya		Akin Omotoso	South Africa
Vazante		Daniela Thomas	Brazil, Portugal
When the Day Had No Name		Teona Strugar Mitevska	Macedonia, Belgium, Slovenia
The Wound		John Trengove	South Africa, Germany, Netherlands, France
Panorama Dokumente
Adriana's Pact	El Pacto de Adriana	Lissette Orozco	Chile
Belinda		Marie Dumora	France
Bones of Contention		Andrea Weiss	United States
Casting JonBenet		Kitty Green	United States
Chavela		Catherine Gund, Daresha Kyi	United States
Dream Boat		Tristan Ferland Milewski	Germany
Erase and Forget		Andrea Luka Zimmerman	United Kingdom
Five Stars	Fünf Sterne	Annekatrin Hendel	Germany
Ghost Hunting	Istiyad Ashbah	Raed Andoni	France, Palestine, Switzerland, Qatar
I Am Not Your Negro		Raoul Peck	France, United States, Belgium, Switzerland
If I Think of Germany at Night	Denk ich an Deutschland in der Nacht	Romuald Karmakar	Germany
In the Intense Now	No Intenso Agora	João Moreira Salles	Brazil
Investigating Paradise	Tahqiq fel djenna	Merzak Allouache	France, Algeria
My Wonderful West Berlin	Mein wunderbares West-Berlin	Jochen Hick	Germany
Politics, Instructions Manual	Política, manual de instrucciones	Fernando León de Aranoa	Spain
Fighting Through the Night	Combat au bout de la nuit	Sylvain L'Espérance	Canada
Revolution of Sound: Tangerine Dream		Margarete Kreuzer	Germany
Small Talk	日常對話	Hui-chen Huang	Taiwan
Strong Island		Yance Ford	United States, Denmark
Tania Libre		Lynn Hershman Leeson	United States
Untitled		Michael Glawogger, Monika Willi	Austria, Germany

=== Perspektive Deutsches Kino ===
The following films were selected for the Perspektive Deutsches Kino section:

English title	Original title	Director(s)
Back for Good	Zurück für Gut	Mia Spengler
The Best of All Worlds	Die beste aller Welten	Adrian Goiginger
Container	Kontener	Sebastian Lang
Dark Blue Girl	Die Tochter	Mascha Schilinski
End of the Season	Zwischen den Jahren	Lars Henning
Final Stage		Nicolaas Schmidt
Gabi		Michael Fetter Nathansky
Ironhead	Eisenkopf	Tian Dong
Mikel		Cavo Kernich
Millennials		Jana Bürgelin
Paths	Ein Weg	Chris Miera
Self-criticism of a Bourgeois Dog	Selbstkritik eines bürgerlichen Hundes	Julian Radlmaier
Tara		Felicitas Sonvilla
We Were Kings	Könige der Welt	Christian von Brockhausen, Timo Großpietsch

=== Berlinale Special ===
The following films were selected for the Berlinale Special section:

English title	Original title	Director(s)	Production country
4 Blocks		Marvin Kren	Germany
Below the Surface		Kasper Barfoed	Denmark, Germany
Black Spot		Mathieu Missoffe	France, Belgium
The Bomb		Kevin Ford, Smriti Keshari, Eric Schlosser	United States
Close-Up	کلوزآپ ، نمای نزدیک	Abbas Kiarostami	Iran
Devil's Freedom	La libertad del diablo	Everardo González	Mexico
Eight Hours Don't Make a Day	Acht Stunden sind kein Tag	Rainer Werner Fassbinder	Germany
In Times of Fading Light	In Zeiten des abnehmenden Lichts	Matti Geschonneck	Germany
Last Days in Havana	Últimos días en La Habana	Fernando Pérez	Cuba, Spain
The Lost City of Z		James Gray	United States
Maudie		Aisling Walsh	Canada, Ireland
Patriot		Steven Conrad	United States
A Prominent Patient	Masaryk	Julius Sevcík	Czech Republic, Slovakia
The Queen of Spain	La reina de España	Fernando Trueba	Spain
The Same Sky	Der gleiche Himmel	Oliver Hirschbiegel	Germany, Czech Republic
SS-GB		Philipp Kadelbach	United Kingdom
The Trial: The State of Russia vs Oleg Sentsov		Askold Kurov	Estonia, Poland, Czech Republic
The Young Karl Marx	Le jeune Karl Marx	Raoul Peck	France, Germany, Belgium

== Official Awards ==
The following prizes were awarded:

=== Main Competition ===
- Golden Bear: On Body and Soul by Ildikó Enyedi
- Silver Bear Grand Jury Prize: Félicité by Alain Gomis
- Alfred Bauer Prize: Spoor by Agnieszka Holland
- Silver Bear for Best Director: Aki Kaurismäki for The Other Side of Hope
- Silver Bear for Best Actress: Kim Min-hee for On the Beach at Night Alone
- Silver Bear for Best Actor: Georg Friedrich for Bright Nights
- Silver Bear for Best Screenplay: Sebastián Lelio and Gonzalo Maza for A Fantastic Woman
- Silver Bear for Outstanding Artistic Contribution: Dana Bunescu for Ana, mon amour (editing)

=== GWFF Best First Feature Award ===
- Estiu 1993 by Carla Simón

=== Short Film Competition ===
- Golden Bear for Best Short Film: Cidade Pequena by Diogo Costa Amarante
- Silver Bear for Best Short Film: Esteban Arrangoiz Julien for Ensueño en la Pradera

=== Panorama ===
==== Panorama Audience Award ====
- 1st Place: Insyriated by Philippe Van Leeuw
- 2nd Place: Close-Knit by Naoko Ogigami
- 3rd Place: 1945 by Ferenc Török

==== Panorama Audience Award – Documentaries (Panorama Dokumente) ====
- 1st Place: I Am Not Your Negro by Raoul Peck
- 2nd Place: Chavela by Catherine Gund and Daresha Kyi
- 3rd Place: Ghost Hunting by Raed Andoni

=== Generation ===
==== Generation 14plus ====
- Best Film: Butterfly Kisses by Rafael Kapelinski
  - Special Mention: Those Who Make Revolution Halfway Only Dig Their Own Graves by Mathieu Denis and Simon Lavoie
- Crystal Bear for Best Short Film: Wolfe by Claire Randall
  - Special Mention Short Film: Snip by Terril Calder

==== Generation KPlus ====
- The Grand Prix of the Generation 14plus International Jury for Best Film: Shkola nomer 3 by Yelizaveta Smith and Georg Genoux
  - Special Mention: Ben Niao by Huang Ji and Ryuji Otsuka
- Special Prize of the Generation 14plus International Jury for the Best Short Film: The Jungle Knows You Better Than You Do by Juanita Onzaga
  - Special Mention Short Film: U Plavetnilo by Antoneta Alamat Kusijanović

== Independent Awards ==
=== Teddy Award ===
- Best Feature Film: A Fantastic Woman by Sebastián Lelio
- Best Documentary-/Essay Film: Small Talk by Hui-chen Huang
- Best Short Film: My Gay Sister by Lia Hietala
- Special Jury Award: Close-Knit by Naoko Ogigami
- Special Teddy Award: Monika Treut

=== FIPRESCI Prize ===
- Competition: On Body and Soul by Ildikó Enyedi
- Panorama: Pendular by Júlia Murat
- Forum: A Feeling Greater Than Love by Mary Jirmanus Saba

=== Prize of the Ecumenical Jury ===
- Competition: On Body and Soul by Ildikó Enyedi
  - Special Mention: A Fantastic Woman by Sebastián Lelio
- Panorama: Investigating Paradise by Merzak Allouache
  - Special Mention: I Am Not Your Negro by Raoul Peck
- Forum: Mama Colonel by Dieudo Hamadi
  - Special Mention: El Mar La Mar by Joshua Bonnetta and J.P. Sniadecki

=== CICAE Art Cinema Award ===
- Panorama: Centaur by Aktan Abdykalykov
- Forum: Newton by Amit V. Masurkar

=== Berliner Morgenpost Readers' Jury Award ===
- On Body and Soul by Ildikó Enyedi

=== Tagesspiegel Readers' Jury Award ===
- Mama Colonel by Dieudo Hamadi

=== Harvey-Manner Readers' Jury Award ===
- God's Own Country by Francis Lee

=== Guild Film Prize ===
- The Party by Sally Potter

=== Caligari Film Prize ===
- El mar la mar by Joshua Bonnetta and J.P. Sniadecki

=== Heiner Carow Prize ===
- Five Stars by Annekatrin Hendel

=== Compass-Perspektive-Award ===
- The Best of All Worlds by Adrian Goiginger

=== Kompagnon-Fellowship ===
- Perspektive Deutsches Kino: White Snail by Levin Peter and Elsa Kremser
- Berlinale Talents: System Crasher by Nora Fingscheidt

=== ARTE International Prize ===
- Lost Country by Vladimir Perišić

=== Eurimages Co-Production Development Award ===
- Razor Film Produktion for The Wife of the Pilot

=== VFF Talent Highlight Award ===
- Nefes Polat for The Bus to Amerika

=== Film Prize of the Robert Bosch Stiftung for International Cooperation Germany / Arab World ===
- Animation Film: Night by Ahmad Saleh
- Short Film: The Trap by Nada Riyadh
- Documentary Film: Behind Closed Doors by Yakout Elhababi

=== Amnesty International Film Prize ===
- Devil's Freedom by Everardo González
