= 75th Locarno Film Festival =

Film festival in Locarno, Switzerland

- Festival poster
- Opening film: Bullet Train
- Closing film: Everything About Martin Suter. Everything but the Truth
- Location: Locarno, Switzerland
- Founded: 1946
- Awards: Golden Leopard: Rule 34
- Hosted by: Associazione Festival del film Locarno
- Artistic director: Giona A. Nazzaro
- No. of films: 226
- Festival date: Opening: 3 August 2022; Closing: 13 August 2022
- Website: 75 Locarno Film Festival

Locarno Film Festival
- 76th 74th

The 75th Locarno Film Festival was held from 3 to 13 August 2022 in Locarno, Switzerland. Swiss producer Michel Merkt was the jury president for the main competition. Brazilian filmmaker Júlia Murat won the Golden Leopard, the festival's top prize, for the drama film Rule 34.

The 75th edition of Locarno Film Festival celebrated as diamond jubilee edition screened 226 films including 105 world premieres and 3 international premieres. It hosted retrospective screenings of Douglas Sirk's films in its Retrospettiva section. On the last day of the festival the Variety Piazza Grande Award went to French film Annie Colère by Blandine Lenoir, and the Prix du Public UBS to Swiss-Belgian film Last Dance by Delphine Lehericey. 128,500 audience watched the screenings during the eleven days of the festival, along with the film professionals.

The festival opened with American action comedy film Bullet Train by David Leitch, and closed with Swiss-German documentary film Everything About Martin Suter. Everything but the Truth by André Schäfer.

== Juries ==
=== International Competition ===
- Michel Merkt, Swiss producer and consultant (Jury President)
- Prano Bailey-Bond, Welsh filmmaker
- Alain Guiraudie, French filmmaker
- William Horberg, American film producer and chair emeritus of the Producers Guild of America
- Laura Samani, Italian director

=== Filmmakers of the Present ===
- Annick Mahnert, film festival curator, film producer and director of programming at Fantastic Fest, programs the Sitges International Fantastic Film Festival
- Gitanjali Rao, Indian theatre actress, animator and filmmaker
- Katriel Schory, producer, senior consultant international co-productions

=== Leopards of Tomorrow ===
- Walter Fasano, Italian film editor and director
- Azra Deniz Okyay, Turkish filmmaker
- Ada Solomon, Romanian producer

=== First Feature ===
- Boo Junfeng, Singaporean filmmaker
- Shahram Mokri, Iranian filmmaker
- Madeline Robert, French producer

=== Green Pardo WWF ===
- Thierry Hugot, responsible for the Sustainability Study Group at Eurimages
- Sonia I. Seneviratne, Swiss climate scientist, professor at the Institute for Atmospheric and Climate Science of the ETH Zurich
- Alessandro Rak, Italian cartoonist, animator and director

== Official Sections ==
=== Piazza Grande ===
The following films were selected to be screened at the Piazza Grande, Locarno's open-air theater that accommodates a nightly audience of up to 8,000 people, competing for Prix du Public UBS:

English Title	Original Title	Director(s)	Production Country
Angry Annie	Annie Colère	Blandine Lenoir	France
Bullet Train (opening film)		David Leitch	United States
Delta		Michele Vannucci	Italy
Everything About Martin Suter. Everything but the Truth (closing film)	Alles über Martin Suter. Ausser die Wahrheit	André Schäfer	Switzerland, Germany
Home of the Brave (1986)		Laurie Anderson	United States
Imitation of Life (1959)		Douglas Sirk	United States
Last Dance		Delphine Lehericey	Switzerland, Belgium
Medusa Deluxe		Thomas Hardiman	United Kingdom
My Neighbor Adolf	השכן שלי אדולף	Leonid Prudovsky	Israel, Poland, Colombia
Paradise Highway		Anna Gutto	United States, Germany, Switzerland
Piano Piano		Nicola Prosatore	Italy
Printed Rainbow (2006)		Gitanjali Rao	India
Semret		Caterina Mona	Switzerland
The Sleeping Car Murders (1965)	Compartiment tueurs	Costa-Gavras	France
A Woman	Une femme de notre temps	Jean Paul Civeyrac	France
You Will Not Have My Hate	Vous n'aurez pas ma haine	Kilian Riedhof	Germany, France, Belgium
Where the Crawdads Sing		Olivia Newman	United States
Pre-Festival
No Dogs or Italians Allowed	Interdit aux chiens et aux Italiens	Alain Ughetto	France, Italy, Belgium, Portugal, Switzerland

=== Main competition ===
The following films were selected to compete for the Golden Leopard:

English Title	Original title	Director(s)	Production Country
The Adventures of Gigi the Law	Gigi la legge	Alessandro Comodin	Italy, France, Belgium
At Night the Cats Are Brown	De noche los gatos son pardos	Valentin Merz	Switzerland
Declaration	Ariyippu	Mahesh Narayanan	India
Fairytale	Сказка	Alexander Sokurov	Belgium, Russia
Human Flowers of Flesh		Helena Wittmann	Germany, France
I Have Electric Dreams	Tengo sueños eléctricos	Valentina Maurel	Belgium, France, Costa Rica
Il Pataffio		Francesco Lagi	Italy
Matter Out of Place		Nikolaus Geyrhalter	Austria
Piaffe		Ann Oren	Germany
Rule 34	Regra 34	Júlia Murat	Brazil
Sermon to the Fish	Balıqlara xütbə	Hilal Baydarov	Azerbaijan, Mexico, Switzerland, Turkey
Saturn Bowling	Bowling Saturne	Patricia Mazuy	France, Belgium
Serviam – I Will Serve	Serviam – Ich will dienen	Ruth Mader	Austria
Stella in Love	Stella est amoureuse	Sylvie Verheyde	France
Stone Turtle		Woo Ming Jin	Malaysia, Indonesia
Tales of the Purple House	Hikayat elbeit elorjowani	Abbas Fahdel	Lebanon, Iraq, France
Tommy Guns	Nação Valente	Carlos Conceição	Portugal, France, Angola

=== Out of Competition ===
The following films were selected to be screened out of competition:

English Title	Original Title	Director(s)	Production Country
Candy Land		John Swab	United States
ERICA JONG - breaking the wall		Kaspar Kasics	Switzerland
Continental Drift (South)	La dérive des continents (au sud)	Lionel Baier	Switzerland, France
Lola		Andrew Legge	Ireland, United Kingdom
Obscure night - Wild leaves (The burning ones, the obstinate)	Nuit obscure - Feuillets sauvages (Les brûlants, les obstinés)	Sylvain George	France, Switzerland
Love Lights	Objectos de Luz	Acácio de Almeida, Marie Carré	Portugal
Where Is This Street? or With No Before And After	Onde Fica Esta Rua? ou Sem Antes Nem Depois	João Pedro Rodrigues, João Rui Guerra da Mata	Portugal, France
Prisma		Ludovico Bessegato	Italy
Prologos		Mantas Kvedaravičius	Lithuania, Greece
W		Anna Eriksson	Finland

=== Filmmakers of the Present Competition ===
The following films were selected to compete for the Golden Leopard – Filmmakers of the Present:

English Title	Original Title	Director(s)	Production Country
A Perfect Day for Caribou		Jeff Rutherford	United States
Arnold Is a Model Student	Arnon pen nakrian tuayang	Sorayos Prapapan	Thailand, Singapore, France, Netherlands, Philippines
Astrakan		David Depesseville	France
Before I Change My Mind		Trevor Anderson	Canada
Fragments From Heaven		Adnane Baraka	Morocco, France
How Is Katia?	Yak Tam Katia?	Christina Tynkevych	Ukraine
It Is Night in America	É Noite na América	Ana Vaz	Italy, France, Brazil
Little Ones	Petites	Julie Lerat-Gersant	France
Love Dog		Bianca Lucas	Poland, Mexico, United States
Matadero		Santiago Fillol	Argentina, Spain, France
Nightsiren	Svetlonoc	Tereza Nvotová	Slovakia, Czech Republic
Our Lady of the Chinese Shop	Nossa Senhora da Loja do Chinês	Ery Claver	Angola
Petrol		Alena Lodkina	Australia
Safe Place	Sigurno mjesto	Juraj Lerotić	Croatia
Sister, What Grows Where Land Is Sick?	Den siste våren	Franciska Eliassen	Norway

=== Leopards of Tomorrow ===
==== International competition ====
The following films were select to the Leopard of Tomorrow International Competition:

English Title	Original Title	Director(s)	Production Country
Airhostess-737		Thanasis Neofotistos	Greece
At Little Wheelie Three Days Ago		Andrew Stephen Lee	United States
Neighbour Abdi	Buurman Abdi	Douwe Dijkstra	Netherlands
Castells		Blanca Camell Galí	France, Spain
Dancing Colors		M. Reza Fahriyansyah	Indonesia
Daron, Daron Colbert		Kevin Steen	United States
Pillow Face	Faccia di cuscino	Saverio Cappiello	Italy
Hardly Working		Total Refusal	Austria
Diamond Kid	L'Enfant au diamant	Pierre Edouard Dumora	France
Shadow of the Butterflies	L'Ombre des papillons	Sofia El Khyari	France, Portugal, Qatar, Morocco
Lake of Fire		NEOZOON	Germany
Balls	Lopte	Gorana Jovanović	Serbia, Slovenia
Moon That Cracks Over the Darkness of My Loneliness	Luna que se quiebra sobre la tiniebla de mi soledad	Lucila Mariani	Argentina
Mother Prays All Day Long	Madar tamame rooz doa mikhanad	Hoda Taheri	Germany
In the Big Yard Inside the Teeny-Weeny Pocket	Mini-mini-pokke no okina niwa de	Yoko Yuki	Japan
Misaligned		Marta Magnuska	Poland, Latvia
Money and Happiness		Ana Nedeljkovic, Nikola Majdak Jr	Serbia, Slovenia, Slovakia
Mulika		Maisha Maene	Democratic Republic of Congo
Sovereign	Soberane	Wara	Cuba
Tiger Stabs Tiger		Jie Shen	China

==== National Competition (Concorso nazionale) ====
The following films were select to the Leopard of Tomorrow Swiss National Competition:

English Title	Original Title	Director(s)	Production Country
Brandon Roi		Romain Jaccoud	Switzerland
The Newt Congress	Der Molchkongress	Matthias Sahli, Immanuel Esser	Switzerland
Euridice, Euridice		Lora Mure-Ravaud	Switzerland
Fairplay		Zoel Aeschbacher	Switzerland
Heart Fruit		Kim Allamand	Switzerland
Heartbeat		Michèle Flury	Switzerland
I'm the Only One I Wanna See		Lucia Martinez Garcia	Switzerland
Gods of the Supermarket	Les Dieux du supermarché	Alberto Gonzalez Morales	Switzerland
Limits	Limites	Simon de Diesbach	Switzerland
Serafina		Noa Epars, Anna Simonetti	Switzerland

==== Competition of Author's Shorts ====
The following films were select to the Leopard of Tomorrow Shorts Competition:

English Title	Original Title	Director(s)	Production Country
Asterión		Francesco Montagner	Czech Republic, Slovakia
At Dusk	Au crépuscule	Miryam Charles	Canada
Big Bang		Carlos Segundo	France, Brazil
Song for the Buried City	Chant pour la ville enfouie	Nicolas Klotz, Elisabeth Perceval	France
Watch the Fire or Burn Inside It	Il faut regarder le feu ou brûler dedans	Caroline Poggi, Jonathan Vinel	France
Paradiso, XXXI, 108		Kamal Aljafari	Palestine, Germany
Poitiers		Jérôme Reybaud	France
Nothing Will Be the Same Again	Rien ne sera plus comme avant	Elina Löwensohn	France
Last Screening	Songy Seans	Darezhan Omirbaev	Kyrgyzstan, Kazakhstan
That's How the Summer Ended	Tako se je končalo poletje	Matjaž Ivanišin	Slovenia, Hungary, Italy

==== Special Events ====
The following films were select to the Leopard of Tomorrow Special Events:

Original Title	Director(s)	Production Country
Let's make something ('Mano destra, Mano sinistra', 'Limes', 'Ci andavo in bicicletta', 'Lorem Ipsum', 'Buio', 'Virilio|Brecht', 'Nido di Pietra', 'La visita', 'Happy Homes', 'Sonnenstube', 'The Fortunates', 'Please make it work')	Younes Ben Slimane, Caterina Biasiucci, Matilde Casari, Ben Donateo, María Silvia Esteve, Antonio Valerio Frascella, Reto Gelshorn, Maria Giménez Cavallo, Agnese Làposi, Davide Palella, Moona Pennanen, Daniel Soares	Switzerland

=== Open Doors Screenings ===
The following films were select to Open Doors Screenings:

English Title	Original Title	Director(s)	Production Country
90 Minutes	90 minutos	Aeden O'Connor Agurcia	Honduras
Ayiti mon amour		Guetty Felin	Haiti, United States
Option Zero	La opción cero	Marcel Beltrán	Brazil, Cuba, Colombia
Medea		Alexandra Latishev Salazar	Costa Rica, Chile
Right Near the Beach		Gibrey Allen	United States, Jamaica
Roza		Andres Rodríguez	Guatemala, Mexico
The Fishes Within	Todos los peces	Brenda Vanegas	El Salvador
A Film About Couples	Una película sobre parejas	Natalia Cabral, Oriol Estrada	Dominican Republic

=== Open Doors Short Films Screenings ===
Original Title	Director	Production Country
Agwe	Samuel Frantz Suffren	Haiti
Black Doll	Akley Olton	Saint Vincent, Grenadines
Hojas de K.	Gloria Carrión	Nicaragua, Costa Rica
Liremu Barana	Elvis Caj Cojoc	Guatemala, Norway
Negra soy'	Laura Bermúdez	Honduras
Out of many	Rebecca Williams	Jamaica
Scars of Our Mothers' Dreams	Meschida Philip	Grenada
Techos Rotos	Yanillys Pérez	Dominican Republic
Tundra	José Luis Aparicio Ferrera	Cuba
Umbra	Daniela Muñoz Barroso	Cuba

=== Histoire(s) du Cinéma ===
The following films were select to the Histoire(s) du Cinéma section:

English Title	Original title	Director(s)	Production Country
Broken Blossoms (1919)		D. W. Griffith	United States
City of Ghosts (2002)		Matt Dillon	United States
Day of Despair (1992)	O Dia do Desespero	Manoel de Oliveira	Portugal, France
Die letzten Heimposamenter		Yves Yersin, Eduard Winiger	Switzerland
Drugstore Cowboy (1989)		Gus Van Sant	United States
Get Out (2017)		Jordan Peele	United States
Heart of a Dog (2015)		Laurie Anderson	United States, France
Meek's Cutoff (2010)		Kelly Reichardt	United States
Night Moves (2013)		Kelly Reichardt	United States
Nocturnal Animals (2016)		Tom Ford	United States
Our Private Lives	Nos vies privées	Denis Côté	Canada
The Panther Women	Las mujeres panteras	René Cardona	Mexico
Pond Life		Bill Buckhurst	United Kingdom
Shock Troops (1967)	Un homme de trop	Costa-Gavras	France, Italy
Split (2016)		M. Night Shyamalan	United States
Tempo d'amarsi		Elio Ruffo	Italy
The Written Face		Daniel Schmid	Switzerland, Japan

=== Retrospective (Retrospettiva) ===
==== Douglas Sirk ====
English Title	Original title	Director(s)	Production Country
3 x Ehe		Douglas Sirk	Germany
A Scandal in Paris		Douglas Sirk	United States
A Time to Love and a Time to Die		Douglas Sirk	United States
Final agreement		IR Bay (Ignacy Rosencranz), Douglas Sirk (uncredited)	France, Switzerland
All I Desire		Douglas Sirk	United States
All That Heaven Allows		Douglas Sirk	United States
April, April!		Douglas Sirk	Germany
Battle Hymn		Douglas Sirk	United States
Boefje		Douglas Sirk	Netherlands
Bourbon Street Blues		Douglas Sirk	Germany
Captain Lightfoot		Douglas Sirk	United States
The Court Concert	Das Hofkonzert	Douglas Sirk	Germany
The Girl from the Marsh Croft	Das Mädchen vom Moorhof	Douglas Sirk	Germany
Der eingebildete Kranke		Douglas Sirk	Germany
Triad	Dreiklang	Hans Hinrich	Germany
Has Anybody Seen My Gal?		Douglas Sirk	United States
Hitler's Madman		Douglas Sirk	United States
Interlude		Douglas Sirk	United States
La Habanera		Douglas Sirk	Germany
Lured		Douglas Sirk	United States
Magnificent Obsession		Douglas Sirk	United States
Meet Me at the Fair		Douglas Sirk	United States
Mystery Submarine		Douglas Sirk	United States
No Room for the Groom		Douglas Sirk	United States
Final Accord	Schlussakkord	Douglas Sirk	Germany
Shockproof		Douglas Sirk	United States
Sign of the Pagan		Douglas Sirk	United States
Silvesternacht - Ein Dialog		Douglas Sirk	Germany
Sleep, My Love		Douglas Sirk	United States
Slightly French		Douglas Sirk	United States
Sprich zu mir wie der Regen		Douglas Sirk	Germany
Pillars of Society	Stützen der Gesellschaft	Douglas Sirk	Germany
Summer Storm		Douglas Sirk	United States
Take Me to Town		Douglas Sirk	United States
Taza, Son of Cochise		Douglas Sirk	United States
The First Legion		Douglas Sirk	United States
The Lady Pays Off		Douglas Sirk	United States
The Tarnished Angels		Douglas Sirk	United States
There's Always Tomorrow		Douglas Sirk	United States
Thunder on the Hill		Douglas Sirk	United States
Written on the Wind		Douglas Sirk	United States
To New Shores	Zu neuen Ufern	Douglas Sirk	Germany
Zwei Windhunde		Douglas Sirk	Germany

==== Homages ====
English Title	Original Title	Director(s)	Production Country
Ali: Fear Eats the Soul	Angst essen Seele auf	Rainer Werner Fassbinder	Germany
Douglas Sirk - Hope as in Despair		Roman Hüben	Switzerland, Germany, France
Far from Heaven		Todd Haynes	United States
Mirage of Life: Portrait of Douglas Sirk	Mirage de la vie	Daniel Schmid	Switzerland
The Vanity Tables of Douglas Sirk		Mark Rappaport	United States, France

=== Locarno Kids ===
English Title	Original Title	Director(s)	Production Country
Bombay Rose		Gitanjali Rao	India, France, United Kingdom, Qatar
I Don't Wanna Dance		Flynn Von Kleist	Netherlands
La freccia azzurra		Enzo D'Alò	Italy, Switzerland, Luxembourg
The Red Balloon	Le Ballon rouge	Albert Lamorisse	France
How I Learned to Fly	Leto kada sam naučila da letim	Radivoje Andrić	Serbia, Croatia, Bulgaria, Slovakia
Omar & Pincette		Julien Sulser	Switzerland
Princesse Dragon		Jean-Jacques Denis, Anthony Roux	France
Sihja, The Rebel Fairy	Sihja - kapinaa ilmassa	Marja Pyykkö	Finland, Netherlands, Norway
Yuku et la fleur d'Himalaya		Arnaud Demuynck, Rémi Durin	Belgium, France, Switzerland

=== International Critics' Week (Semaine de la critique) ===
English Title	Original title	Director(s)	Production Country
Ruthless Times - Songs of Care	Armotonta menoa - Hoivatyön lauluja	Susanna Helke	Finland
Last Stop Before Chocolate Mountain		Susanna della Sala	Italy
The River is not a Border	Maayo Wonaa Keerol (Le fleuve n'est pas une frontière)	Alassane Diago	France, Senegal, Germany
The Visitors		Veronika Lišková	Czech Republic, Norway, Slovakia
Fledglings	Pisklaki	Lidia Duda	Poland
The DNA of Dignity		Jan Baumgartner	Switzerland
The Hamlet Syndrome		Elwira Niewiera, Piotr Rosołowski	Poland, Germany

=== Swiss Panorama (Panorama Suisse) ===
English Title	Original Title	Director	Production Country
Action		Benoît Monney	Switzerland
ALA KACHUU - Take and Run		Maria Brendle	Switzerland
Dans la nature		Marcel Barelli	Switzerland
A Piece of Sky	Drii Winter	Michael Koch	Switzerland, Germany
Hugo in Argentina		Stefano Knuchel	Switzerland
Love Will Come Later		Julia Furer	Switzerland
Loving Highsmith		Eva Vitija	Switzerland

== Official Awards ==
=== International Competition ===
- Golden Leopard: Rule 34 by Júlia Murat
- Special Jury Prize: The Adventures of Gigi the Law by Alessandro Comodin
- Best Direction Award: I Have Electric Dreams by Valentina Maurel
- Best Actor Award: Reinaldo Amien Gutiérrez for I Have Electric Dreams
- Best Actress Award: Daniela Marín Navarro for I Have Electric Dreams

=== Filmmakers of the Present ===
- Golden Leopard - Filmmakers of the Present: Nightsiren by Tereza Nvotová
- Special Jury Prize: How Is Katia? by Christina Tynkevych
- Best Emerging Director: Juraj Lerotić for Safe Place
- Leopard for the Best Actress: Anastasia Karpenko for How Is Katia?
- Leopard for the Best Actor: Goran Marković for Safe Place
- Special Mention: Sister, What Grows Where Land Is Sick? by Franciska Eliassen

=== Leopards of Tomorrow ===
==== International Competition (Concorso Internazionale) ====
- Pardino d'oro SRG SSR for the Best International Short Film:
  - Sovereign by Wara
- Pardino d'argento SRG SSR for the International Competition:
  - Neighbour Abdi by Douwe Dijkstra
- Pardi di domani Best Direction Award – BONALUMI Engineering:
  - Hardly Working by Total Refusal
- Medien Patent Verwaltung AG Award:
  - Mulika by Maisha Maene
- Special Mentions:
  - Mother Prays All Day Long by Hoda Taheri

==== National Competition (Concorso Nazionale) ====
- Pardino d'oro Swiss Life for the Best Auteur Short Film:
  - Euridice, Euridice by Lora Mure-Ravaud
- Pardino d'argento Swiss Life for the National Competition:
  - The Newt Congress by Matthias Sahli, Immanuel Esser
- Best Swiss Newcomer Award:
  - Michèle Flury for Heartbeat

==== Competition of Author's Courts (Concorso Corti d'autore) ====
- Pardino d'oro Swiss Life for the Best Auteur Short Film:
  - Big Bang by Carlos Segundo

=== First Feature ===
- Swatch First Feature Award: Safe Place by Juraj Lerotić
- Special Mention:
  - Love Dog by Bianca Lucas
  - At Night the Cats Are Brown by Valentin Merz

=== Green Pardo WWF ===
- Pardo Verde WWF:
  - Matter Out of Place by Nikolaus Geyrhalter
- Special Mentions:
  - Sermon to the Fish by Hilal Baydarov
  - It Is Night in America by Ana Vaz

=== Piazza Grande ===
- Audience award (Prix du Public UBS):
  - Last Dance by Delphine Lehericey
- Variety Piazza Grande Award:
  - Annie Colère by Blandine Lenoir

== Independent jury awards ==
=== Ecumenical Jury Award ===
- Tales of the Purple House by Abbas Fahdel

=== FIPRESCI Award ===
- Stone Turtle by Ming Jin Woo

=== European Cinemas Label Award ===
- Tommy Guns by Carlos Conceição

=== International Critics' Week ===
- Grand Prix:
  - The Hamlet Syndrome by Elwira Niewiera, Piotr Rosołowsk
- Premio Zonta Club Locarno:
  - Ruthless Times – Songs of Care by Susanna Helke
- Marco Zucchi Award:
  - Fledglings by Lidia Duda

=== Junior Jury Awards ===
- Junior Jury Award: Piaffe by Ann Oren
- Runner-up: Tommy Guns by Carlos Conceição
- Second runner-up: Serviam – Ich Will Dienen by Ruth Mader
- Environment Award: Sermon to the Fish by Hilal Baydarov
- Cineasti del Presente Award: Sister, What Grows Where Land is Sick?, by Franciska Eliassen
- Special Mention: Petites by Julie Lerat-Gersant
- Best International Short Film: Hardly Working by Total Refusal
- Best Swiss Short Film: Fairplay by Zoel Aeschbacher
- Special Mention: Les Dieux du Supermarché by Alberto Gonzalez Morales
- Open Doors Short Award: Techos Rotos by Yanillys Pérez

== Special awards ==
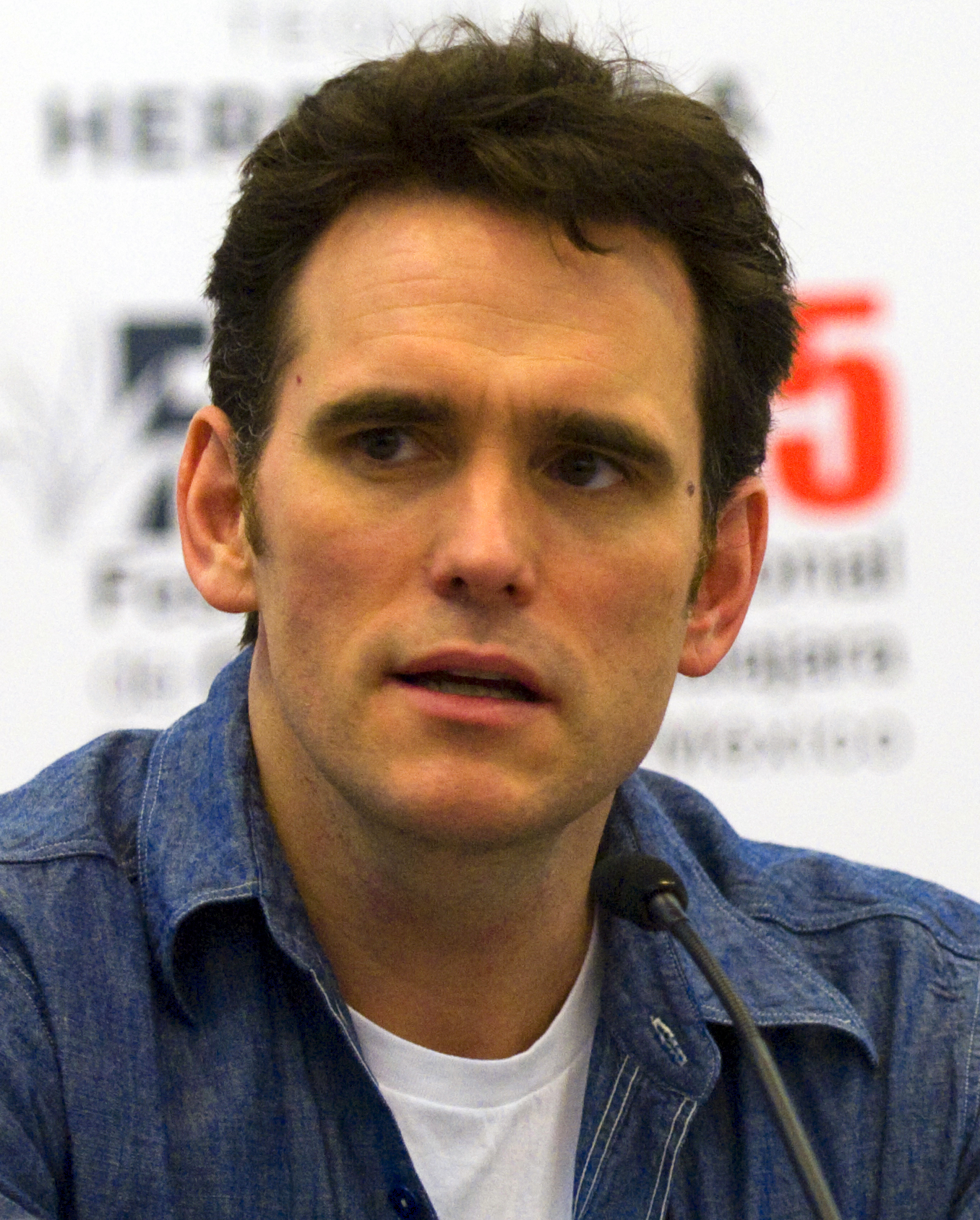
Matt Dillon winner of Leopard of Honour lifetime achievement award

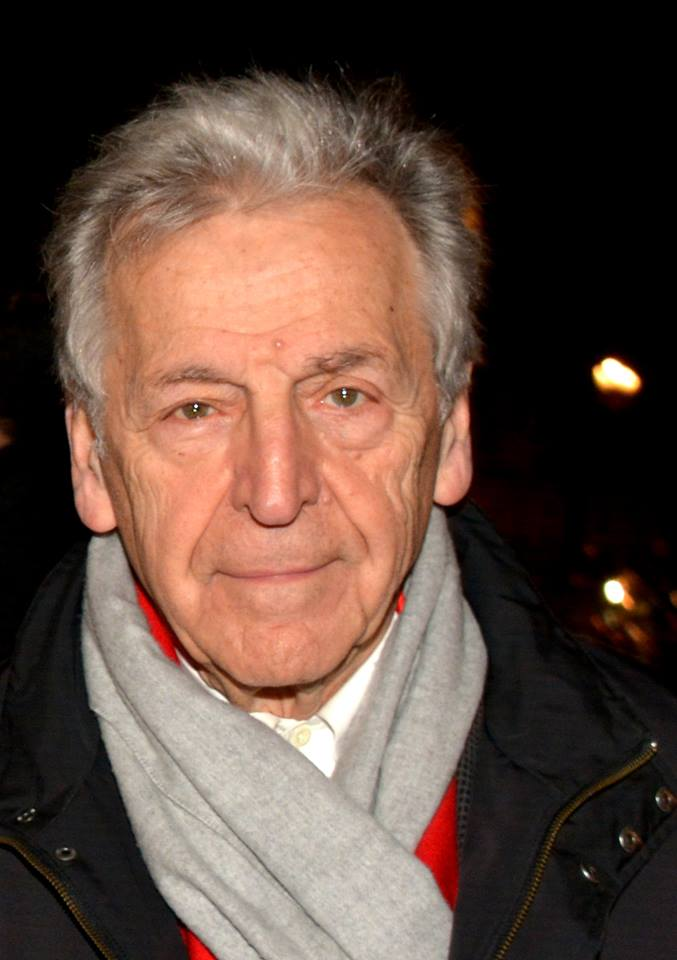
Costa-Gavras winner of Leopard Career Award

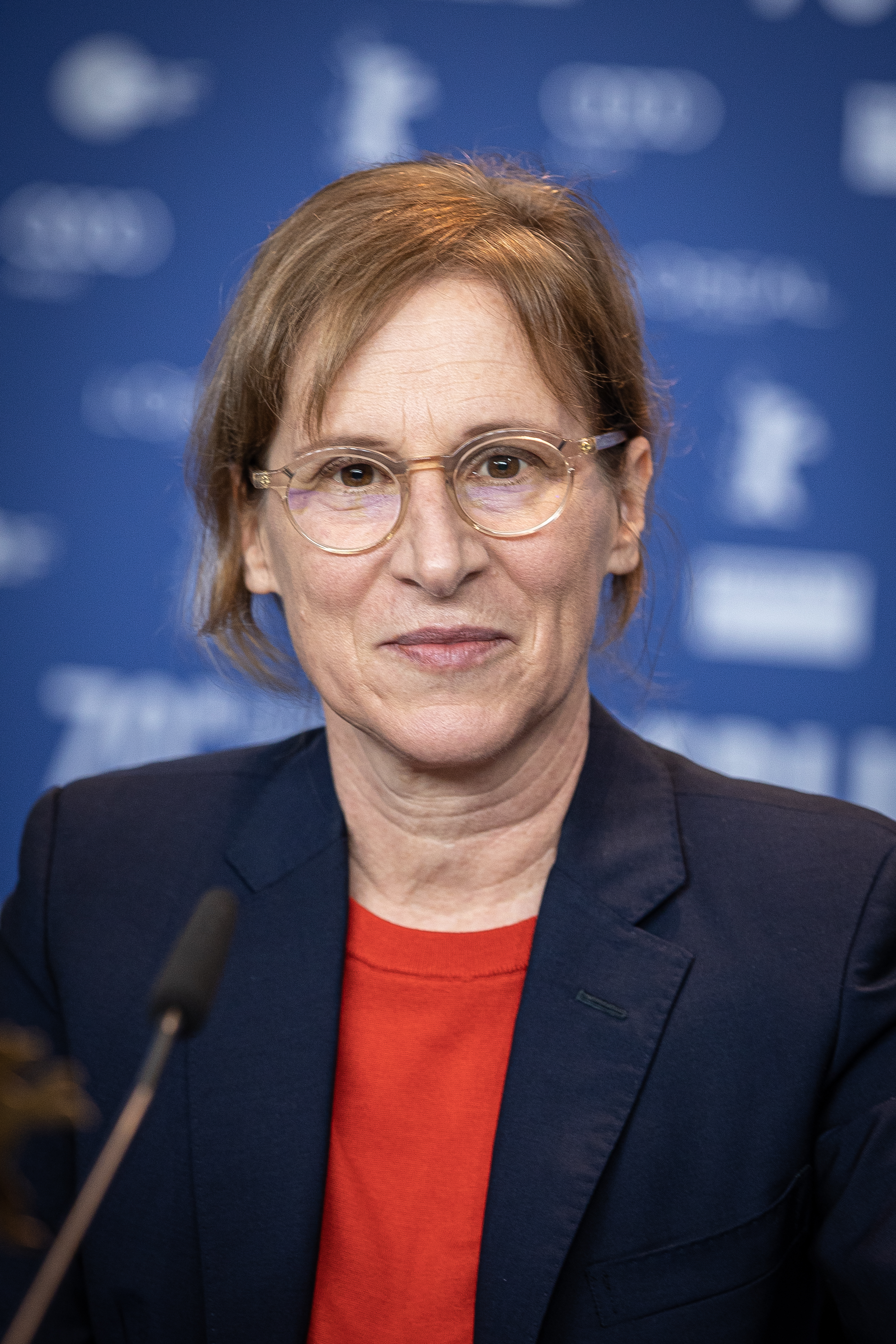
Kelly Reichardt winner of Leopard of Honour

=== Leopard of Honour (Pardo d'onore Manor award) ===
- Matt Dillon
- Kelly Reichardt

=== Locarno Kids Award (la Mobiliare) ===
- Gitanjali Rao

=== Pardo alla carriera (Leopard Career Award) ===
- Costa-Gavras

=== Vision Award Ticinomoda ===
- Laurie Anderson

=== Premio Raimondo Rezzonico ===
- Jason Blum

=== Excellence Award Davide Campari ===
- Aaron Taylor-Johnson

=== Leopard Club Award ===
- Daisy Edgar-Jones

== Events ==
=== Rotonda by la Mobiliare - Come together! ===
This event was held from July 29 to August 14. It is Locarno Film Festival's communal space, featuring a wide range of entertainment and discoveries, open and accessible to all. It constituted following platforms:

- Music
- Art
- Food and beverage

==== VR Experience ====
In collaboration with Geneva International Film Festival (GIFF)
