= Bea Palya =

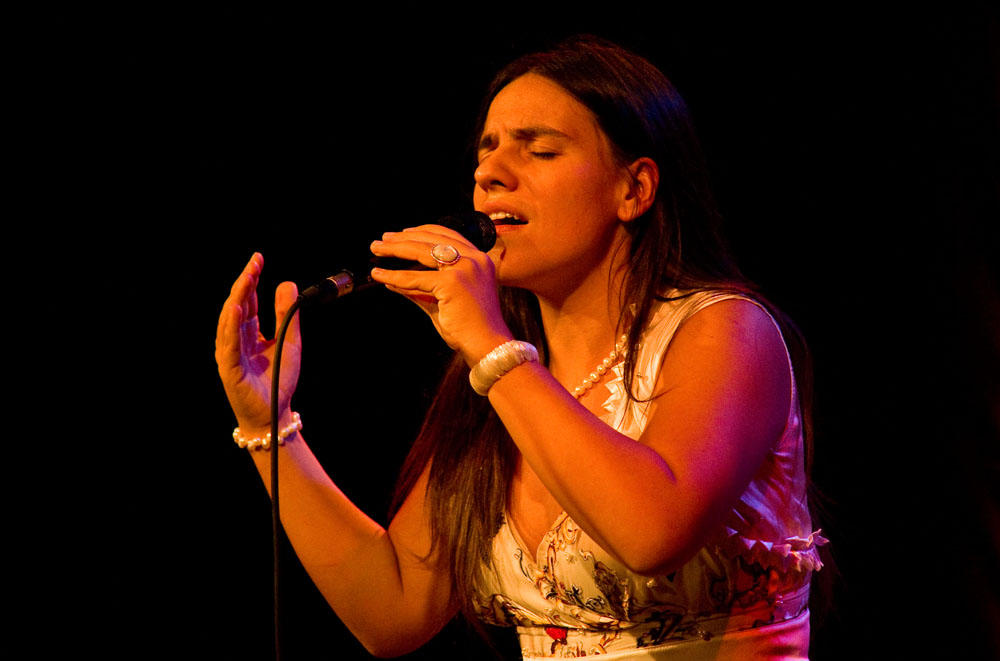
- Bea Palya performing in Budapest (2011)

Background information
- Born: 11 November 1976 (age 49)
- Origin: Hungarian
- Genres: folk music; gipsy music; world music; jazz
- Occupation: Musician
- Instrument: Voice
- Years active: 1994–present
- Website: palyabea.hu

Bea Palya (Hungarian pronunciation: [pɒjɒ bɛ.ɒ]; born Beáta Palya; in Makó, 11 November 1976) is a Hungarian folk and world music singer and songwriter, sometimes appearing in films as an actress or singer.

In her early years she was influenced by Hungarian folk songs, Bulgarian, Jewish and Gypsy music, following her multiple ethnic roots.

Side by side with her musical career, she developed a career in the film industry. She sang the title song for the Hungarian film Portugal (2000). As an amateur actress, Palya appeared in a supporting role in Miklós Jancsó's A mohácsi vész (2004). She played a more important role in French film Transylvania (2006), and sang in Kolorado Kids (2010). In 2017, she made her feature film debut with a leading role in Étienne Comar's biographical film, Django (2017) as the gypsy wife of the title character, guitarist Django Reinhardt.

== Background ==
She grew up in the Hungarian village Bag, where she danced and sang in the local dance-group. She continued her education in Budapest at Apáczai Csere János Gimnázium, than studied ethnography at Eötvös Loránd University. She graduated in 2002.

Initially, she sang in the Hungarian folk music groups Zurgó and Laokoón and began her solo career in 2002. She performs Hungarian and Bulgarian folk music as well as jazz and world music. She also studied both Indian and Persian music.

== Discography ==
- Zurgó: Moldvai csángó népzene (1997)
- Kárpátia: Zene Moldvából (1998)
- Kiss Ferenc: Nagyvárosi bujdosók (1999)
- Balogh Sándor: Dorombér (2000)
- Szőke Szabolcs: Sindbad's songs (2000)
- Chalaban: Moroccan Nomad (2000)
- Cseh Tamás – Péterdi Péter: Magyar katonadalok és énekek... (2000)
- Sebő Együttes: Rejtelmek (2001)
- Folkestra: Mamikám (2001)
- Beáta Palya: Ágról-ágra (tradition in motion) (2003)
- Kárpátia: Vásár (2004)
- Palya Bea: Álom-álom, kitalálom (2004)
- Balázs Elemér Group: Magyar népdalok (2005)
- Kiss Ferenc: Szerelem hava (2005)
- Palya Bea – Weöres Sándor: Psyché (2005)
- Beáta Palya: Adieu les complexes (2008)
- Palya Bea: Egyszálének / Justonevoice (2009)
- Palya Bea: Én leszek a játékszered (2010)
- Palya Bea: Ribizliálom (2011)
- Palya Bea: Ezeregy szefárd éjszaka (live) (2012)
- Palya Bea: Altatok (2012)
- Palya Bea: A nő (2014)
- Palya Bea: Tovább Nő (2016)

== Filmography ==
- Portugál (2000)
- Transylvania (2006) – as La chanteuse du cabaret (as Beáta Palya)
- Kolorádó Kids (2010)
- Django (2017)
