= Found Memories =

2011 film

- Directed by: Júlia Murat
- Written by: Júlia Murat; Maria Clara Escobar; Felipe Scholl
- Starring: Lisa Fávero; Sonia Guedes
- Cinematography: Lucio Bonelli
- Edited by: Marina Meliande
- Music by: Lucas Marcier
- Distributed by: Vitrine Filmes
- Release dates: 2 September 2011 (Venice); 6 July 2012 (Brazil)
- Running time: 98 minutes
- Country: Brazil
- Language: Portuguese

Found Memories (Portuguese: Histórias que Só Existem Quando Lembradas) is a 2011 Brazilian drama film directed by Júlia Murat. It won the Best Narrative Feature Jury Award at the 2012 RiverRun International Film Festival.

== Plot ==
Life in the secluded village of Jotuomba is dictated by the rituals of its aged population. When Rita, a young photographer, comes to town, she disrupts these rituals, awakens this sleepy village, and questions a secret long since locked away in the village cemetery.

== Cast ==
- Lisa Fávero as Rita
- Sonia Guedes as Madalena
- Ricardo Merkin
- Luiz Serra as Antonio
