= Resetting the Table =

Political mediation organization

- Abbreviation: RTT
- Nickname: RTT
- Formation: 2014; 12 years ago
- Founders: Melissa Weintraub, Eyal Rabinovitch
- Region served: USA
- Services: Training and Education Programs Convening and Facilitation Content Creation
- Website: www.resettingthetable.org

Resetting the Table (RTT) is a political mediation organization. RTT uses a transformative mediation methodology to help participants discuss contentious issues, and to teach them to lead discussions about these issues.

Resetting the Table has described its mission as bringing "decades of conflict expertise" toward building "a cohesive, resilient society in the U.S."

== History ==
Resetting the Table was co-founded by Melissa Weintraub, a rabbi and previously founding director of Encounter, a Jewish organization that creates educational programs and experiences to enhance the understanding of the Israeli–Palestinian conflict for Jewish Americans, and Eyal Rabinovitch, former sociology professor at Wesleyan University. RTT was established as an independent organization in 2014.

== Leadership ==
Melissa Weintraub is Co-founder and Co-CEO. She co-founded the initiative with her husband, Eyal Rabinovitch, who also serves as Co-CEO. Leah Reiser is Chief Training Officer. Writer and actress Jen Richards is Resetting the Table's Entertainment Partnerships Director. Seanne Winslow is Senior Advisor of Entertainment.
