= El mar la mar =

- Directed by: Joshua Bonnetta; J.P. Sniadecki
- Release date: February 11, 2017
- Running time: 94 minutes
- Country: United States
- Languages: English; Spanish

El mar la mar is a 2017 American documentary film directed by Joshua Bonnetta and J.P. Sniadecki.

== Production ==
The directors became interested in the subject after meeting a border guard near the Sonoran Desert. They were influenced by Jason De León's book The Land of Open Graves, about the lives and deaths of migrants who cross through the desert. The film takes its name from a poem by Rafael Alberti.

== Release ==
The film premiered on February 11, 2017, at the 67th Berlin International Film Festival, where it won the Caligari Film Prize.

== Reception ==
On the review aggregator website Rotten Tomatoes, 100% of 12 critics' reviews are positive, with an average rating of 7.60/10.
