= Pendular (film) =

Film by Júlia Murat

- Directed by: Júlia Murat
- Written by: Júlia Murat; Matias Mariani
- Produced by: Tatiana Leite; Júlia Murat; Pamela Livia Delgado; Juliette Lepoutre; Andrés Longares; Pierre Menahem; Felicitas Raffo; Julia Solomonoff
- Starring: Raquel Karro; Rodrigo Bolzan
- Cinematography: Soledad Rodríguez
- Edited by: Lia Kulakauskas; Marina Meliande
- Music by: Fabiano Krieger; Lucas Marcier
- Production companies: Esquina Prodoçoes; Bubbles Project; Syndromes Films; Cepa Audiovisual; Still Moving
- Release dates: September 21, 2017 (Brazil); March 24, 2017 (United States); February 11, 2017 (Berlin)
- Running time: 1 hour 48 minutes
- Country: Brazil
- Language: Portuguese

Pendular is a 2017 drama film co-written and directed by Júlia Murat starring Raquel Karro and Rodrigo Bolza. The film centers around an artistic couple, one a dancer the other a sculptor, who live and work together.

It is a Brazilian and French co-production. The film premiered at the 67th Berlin International Film Festival where it won the FIPRESCI Award.

== Plot ==
Part 1: Alice's Arrival

An artist couple, a male sculptor and female dancer, move into a factory loft together. They divide the floor of the empty loft with a roll of tape. One section is for his work, the others for hers.

As they begin to move in they have friends over for soccer, most of them other artists. Throughout the movie the man is show to occasionally play video games online with a female friend with whom he flirts.

Inside their loft, the woman finds a steel cable attached to a pillar labeled "Line Project 2004". She follows it throughout the building to a light post outside, but stops before she finds the end as she isn't wearing any shoes.

Part 2: Impetus

The man asks the woman if he can expand his space into hers as it's "impossible" for him to work without it. She agrees it's okay.

The woman, while reading in a chair, begins balancing on two legs and then balancing between two chairs. This is transformed into a performance at the loft that leads to a party afterwards. The woman dances with friends and kisses one of them in full view of the sculptor. The sculptor sees this and is a little jealous, but she comes over to him. They make out and later have sex.

The dancer receives a bad review on her performance which the man reads to her and she cries. She then begins to practice a new show with a partner in the loft, while the sculptor continues to work on his piece with his female assistant.

Part 3: Action

The couple invites a critic friend, his wife, and their daughter over for dinner. The sculptor says that speaking 'not to the critic, but the friend' he feels lost in his work. The dancer plays with the daughter by dancing.

Later that night, the couple have sex and the man say he wants to give the woman a baby. The woman replies that she doesn't want a baby.

After viewing the sculptor's new pieces, the critic says that he doesn't like them and, as a friend, suggests he find a new project.

The woman searches for inspiration by watching videos, including of Trisha Brown, when she finds a tape labeled "Line Project". She finds out that the cable extends far beyond the city, through the jungle, and to an institution where the sculptor recorded a man singing a song, which the sculptor sings to himself frequently in the present day.

The dancer shows the sculptor bone fragments from a medical condition her father had, and tells him she has never shown them to anyone else. She then asks him to what the steel line connects. The sculptor looks reserved and says it's not important.

The woman leaves the next morning to investigate the line. When she returns late at night, she has a wound on her knee. The sculptor bandages her.

The dancer discovers she's pregnant and gets an abortion without telling the sculptor. When the sculptor finds out by reading post-op paperwork he punches a wall in anger. The dancer sees this and bandages his hand.

Part 4: Contraction

The next scene implies that the two have not seen each other for some time. The woman arrives at a coffee shop and looks around at the seats. She sits down and the man walks up. He asks her how she knew where he was sitting. She says she was watching him and his movements. He says that her ability to absorb movements doesn't mean she understands them. She then shows him a solution to a puzzle he had been trying to solve. The two smile at each other as the woman reaches out and feels his beard.

The next shot is the woman back at the loft. In her space is now a massive sculpture, a giant wood bowl balancing on one point. It's labeled "Holds only one person" and the woman smiles reading it. She climbs onto it and begins to dance, rocking the balancing bowl, calmly and rhythmically, dancing. The film cuts to the exterior of the building, the abandoned industrial factory, the first time it has been seen from the outside.

== Cast ==
- Raquel Karro as She
- Rodrigo Bolzan as He
- Neto Machado as Gal
- Marcio Vito as Rui (as Márcio Vito)
- Felipe Rocha as Donato
- Larissa Siqueira as Luiza
- Martina Revollo as Martina
- Renato Linhares as Leco
- Valeria Barretta as Dolores
- Carlos Eduardo Santos
- Antonio Rabello
- Jorge Alencar

== Release ==
Pendular premiered at the Berlin International Film Festival in 2017. The film also screened at AFI Fest in the New Auteurs and American Independents section in 2017.

== Reception ==
=== Critical response ===
On the review aggregator website Rotten Tomatoes, 67% of 6 critics' reviews are positive. The Hollywood Reporter described the film as different from the comparable movie La La Land because, instead of focusing on making a career, "Murat’s picture revolves around the need to make art, with career an afterthought." A.O. Scott of The New York Times also gave the film a positive review while comparing the film to La La Land saying it is a film "...identical to and the complete opposite of 'La La Land.'"

=== Accolades ===
Won the FIPRESCI Award at the Berlin International Film Festival.
