= Os Dias Com Ele =

2013 film directed by Maria Clara Escobar

- Directed by: Maria Clara Escobar
- Produced by: Paula Pripas
- Edited by: Júlia Murat; Juliana Rojas
- Production company: Filmes de Abril
- Distributed by: Vitrine Filmes
- Release dates: January 24, 2013 (Mostra de Cinema de Tiradentes); February 21, 2014 (Brazil)
- Running time: 107 minutes
- Country: Brazil
- Language: Portuguese

Os Dias Com Ele (English: The days with him) is a 2013 Brazilian documentary film directed by Maria Clara Escobar about her father Carlos Henrique Escobar, who is a philosopher, teacher and playwright that has a history marked by repression suffered during the military dictatorship.
