= Django (2017 film) =

2017 film

- Film poster
- Directed by: Étienne Comar
- Written by: Étienne Comar; Alexis Salatko
- Produced by: Olivier Delbosc; Marc Missonnier; Étienne Comar
- Starring: Reda Kateb; Cécile de France
- Cinematography: Christophe Beaucarne
- Edited by: Monica Coleman
- Music by: Warren Ellis
- Distributed by: Pathé; Under The Milky Way
- Release dates: 9 February 2017 (Berlin); 26 April 2017 (France)
- Running time: 117 minutes
- Country: France
- Language: French

Django is a 2017 French drama film about the life of Django Reinhardt, directed by Étienne Comar. It opened the 67th Berlin International Film Festival. Reinhardt's music is performed in the film by the Rosenberg Trio.

== Cast ==
- Reda Kateb as Django Reinhardt
- Cécile de France as Louise de Klerk
- Bea Palya as Naguine
- Johnny Montreuil as Joseph Reinhardt
- Raphaël Dever as Vola
- Patrick Mille as Charlie Delaunay
- Àlex Brendemühl as Hans Biber
- Ulrich Brandhoff as Hammerstein

== Reception ==
On review aggregator website Rotten Tomatoes, the film holds an approval rating of 61% based on 23 reviews, and an average rating of 5.5/10. On Metacritic, the film has a weighted average score of 49 out of 100, based on 13 critics, indicating "mixed or average reviews".
