= Seanne Winslow =

Seanne Winslow is an American filmmaker, screenwriter, producer, and cultural diplomat. Winslow wrote Netflix’s Nowhere, Netflix's most-viewed non-English title of 2023. She executive produced The Lego Movie. Winslow is the Film Program Director for Transatlantic Stars, an initiative of the European Union Delegation to the U.S.

== Early life ==
Seanne Winslow was born in Germany to American parents and raised across Europe.

== Career ==
=== Film ===
Seanne Winslow has produced and served as project executive on multiple major studio films, including Sherlock Holmes. Winslow held senior creative leadership roles at Lin Pictures (now Rideback), responsible for finding and acquiring material and developing their feature film slate and as executive producer.

While at Lin Pictures, Winslow executive produced The Lego Movie, named by the National Board of Review as one of the top-ten films of 2014, and since named as one of the top animated films of all time. Winslow worked on the Lego Movie for six years, receiving an Executive Producer credit from Warner Bros. Pictures.

Winslow wrote and directed The Falconer, the first international feature ever to be entirely shot in Oman. The film screened at more than twenty U.S. and international festivals, winning 14 awards. The film was released theatrically in the U.S. via Gravitas Ventures in October 2022 and Dubai-based Front Row Filmed Entertainment acquired all Middle East and North Africa rights. As of 2026, The Falconer received a 100% critics rating on Rotten Tomatoes. Among its honors, The Falconer was named a staff pick at the Austin Film Festival won Best Narrative Feature and Best Director at SCAD Savannah Film Festival, and won the jury award for Best Narrative Feature at the Newport Beach Film Festival, where Winslow also won for Best Screenwriter.

The Hollywood Reporter called The Falconer "thoughtful," noting Winslow and Sjoberg for working "hard to meet the region on its own terms," as well as capturing Oman's landscape naturally, rather than the denigratory visual approach common in Western productions set in the region.

Seanne Winslow wrote Netflix's Nowhere, Netflix's most-viewed non-English title of 2023. Netflix fans on social media ranked Nowhere the best survival movie of all time, above films like The Martian, Gravity, and 127 Hours.

Winslow is attached to write and direct Aristides: A Righteous Life, the true-life account of a Portuguese diplomat who saved thousands from the Nazis in WWII, based out of Portugal's consulate in Bordeaux. The project is part of the inaugural slate of Madrid-based N&L Films.

=== Advisory and Coaching ===
Winslow is Senior Advisor of Entertainment to Resetting the Table, a conflict transformation organization specializing in dialogue across viewpoints, that trains leaders, Hollywood storytellers, and executives to help them craft more nuanced, humanizing stories that bridge societal divides, promote pluralism, and reduce polarization through storytelling.

Winslow is a Martha Beck–trained Wayfinder Coach, working with founders, executives, and creatives.

=== Cultural Diplomacy ===
Winslow is the Film Program Director for the Transatlantic Rising Stars Project, known as "Transatlantic Stars", an initiative of the Delegation of the European Union to the U.S, designed to foster creative collaboration between the EU and the United States, and the first formal EU program to bring European artists to the U.S. in a structured, fully funded format, described as "a historic moment in cultural diplomacy." In her role with Transatlantic Stars, Winslow bridges European filmmakers with U.S. audiences and industry partners, drawing on her experience in American film production.

== Honors and awards ==
In 2022, Winslow was named one of Austin Film Festival’s 2022 Screenwriters To Watch List, Presented by MovieMaker Magazine. Winslow has received numerous awards for her work writing and directing The Falconer, among them: Best Film Narrative Feature and Best Screenwriter at the 2021 Newport Beach Film Festival, Best Narrative Feature at the 30th Heartland International Film Festival, Best in Show at the 2022 Santa Fe Film Festival, Best Narrative Feature and Best Director at SCAD Savannah Film Festival, the Special Jury Award for Narrative Filmmaking at the 2022 Florida Film Festival, and The Peter Brunette Award for Best Director at the 2022 RiverRun International Film Festival.
