= Ghost Hunting (film) =

2017 film

- Film poster
- Directed by: Raed Andoni
- Written by: Raed Andoni
- Produced by: Palmyre Badinier
- Starring: Ramzi Maqdisi
- Cinematography: Camille Cottagnoud
- Edited by: Gladys Joujou
- Distributed by: Urban Sales
- Release date: 12 February 2017 (Berlin)
- Running time: 94 minutes
- Countries: Palestine, France, Switzerland, Qatar
- Language: Arabic

Ghost Hunting (Arabic: اصطياد أشباح, romanized: iṣṭiyād ʾašbāḥ) is a 2017 Palestinian documentary film directed by Raed Andoni and starring Ramzi Maqdisi. It was awarded the best documentary at the Berlinale 2017. Also, it was selected as the Palestinian entry for the Best Foreign Language Film at the 91st Academy Awards, but it was not nominated.

== Synopsis ==
Released Palestinian prisoners of Israel relive and recreate harrowing experiences from their time in Israeli detention facilities.

== See also ==
- List of submissions to the 91st Academy Awards for Best Foreign Language Film
- List of Palestinian submissions for the Academy Award for Best Foreign Language Film
