= Nowhere (2023 film) =

Spanish film directed by Albert Pintó

- Promotional release poster
- Directed by: Albert Pintó
- Screenplay by: Ernest Riera; Miguel Ruz; Indiana Lista; Seanne Winslow; Teresa Rosendoy
- Story by: Indiana Lista
- Produced by: Miguel Ruz
- Starring: Anna Castillo; Tamar Novas
- Production companies: Rock & Ruz
- Distributed by: Netflix
- Release date: 29 September 2023
- Running time: 109 minutes
- Country: Spain
- Language: Spanish

Nowhere is a 2023 Spanish survival thriller film directed by Albert Pintó from a screenplay by Ernest Riera, Miguel Ruz, Indiana Lista, Seanne Winslow, and Teresa Rosendoy which stars Anna Castillo alongside Tamar Novas. Taking place in a dystopian setting, the plot follows Mia (Castillo), separated from her husband after a totalitarian government takes over their home country.

== Plot ==
Mia and Nico decide to leave Spain due to a global crisis that has caused a shortage of necessities and the emergence of a tyrannical government which is killing civilians in an attempt to control a resources shortage. The couple fear for their lives and the safety of their unborn child. They had previously lost their firstborn daughter, Uma, whom the military took away from them as part of a genocidal attempt at reducing Spain's population by killing children, the elderly, and pregnant women. She is presumed dead. Mia blames herself for Uma being taken and carries the guilt with her.

Nico's plan is for them to escape to Ireland by being transported on a cargo ship. Ireland is mentioned in a broadcast as one of the few countries, along with Iceland and Norway, left in Europe that has managed to control the resources crisis and maintain a democratic government. The couple get into a container to be carried by a truck. However, the smugglers separate them when Nico is forced out of the container and onto another container. At a military checkpoint, the military kills everyone in the container but Mia, as she hid on top of a stack of crates. Later, Mia tries to phone Nico to warn him of the danger but fails to reach him.

All containers, including Mia's, are loaded onto a ship. Later a storm causes the containers to fall into the ocean. Her container, slowly filling with water, has a cargo of Tupperware household containers, packaged earphones, packaged flatscreen TVs, bottled vodka, and packaged hoodies, all of which she uses to help herself survive, along with a drill, some tape, and a penknife she had managed to salvage from earlier. Upon hearing screams, she looks through a bullet hole and sees another container, filled with people, sinking underwater just a few metres away. After two days in the container, Nico phones her and tells her that he is on his way to rescue her.

That night, Mia gives birth during a storm to a daughter, Noa. Mia becomes determined to fight for their chances of survival despite being severely weakened, having delusions of Uma, and resorting to eating her placenta. As the water level inside the container rises, Mia manages to puncture a hole in the roof using the drill and the penknife, and she climbs with Noa, on top of it. While trying to capture the attention of a passing airplane, Mia severely gashes her leg. She stitches it using parts from the TVs and uses some vodka to sterilize the wound. She later manages to catch fish using a makeshift net.

Nico phones Mia after roughly twenty days, revealing his precarious health condition after being shot and his unlikely chance of survival. Mia is devastated but shares the news of their daughter's birth with Nico in their final conversation. Nico urges Mia to continue fighting and reach Ireland, promising to always be with them in spirit.

Mia constructs a makeshift raft using materials from the container and drifts in the ocean after the container sinks, hoping for a miracle. Eventually, a family on a fishing boat spots Noa on the floating raft. Mia, however, is unconscious and tied to the raft with a rope. They bring her on board their boat and perform CPR, successfully reviving her.

Mia and Noa are rescued and brought to the shores of Ireland.

== Cast ==
- Anna Castillo as Mia
- Tamar Novas as Nico

== Production ==
Based on a story by Indiana Lista, the screenplay was penned by Ernest Riera, Miguel Ruz, Indiana Lista, Seanne Winslow, and Teresa Rosendoy. The film was produced by Miguel Ruz, with Ruz's partner at Rock & Ruz Jordi Roca serving as executive producer. Shooting locations included the port of Tarragona.

== Release ==
Nowhere was made available to stream on Netflix on 29 September 2023. It reportedly commanded substantial attention on the platform, with over 24 million views after three days, and becoming the most viewed non-English language Netflix film of 2023.

== Reception ==
American review aggregator Rotten Tomatoes reports a 64% approval rating based on 14 reviews from critics with an average score of 6.2/10.

Brian Tallerico of RogerEbert.com gave two-and-a-half stars out of four to the film, stating "There are some disappointing choices in the film's directing, but Castillo should make a lot of those easy to overlook." Manuel D'Ocon of Fotogramas gave a rating of three out of four stars, saying "However, the good message of the story remains and leaves a mark: hope always takes one step further than mankind." (Note: This review was originally written in Spanish. Rotten Tomatoes has a version that translates the review to English.)

David Lorao of HobbyConsolas rated the film with 33 points ('bad'), assessing that, as the title hints, it goes nowhere, nor does it have any narrative interest, otherwise singling out the "portentous" performance by Castillo as a positive point.

Belén Prieto of El Español rated the film 3½ out of 5 stars, citing that writing is perhaps the film's weakest part, otherwise writing that "any 'but' that can be put on Nowhere is more than compensated by Anna Castillo".

== See also ==
- List of Spanish films of 2023
