= Fairplay (2022 film) =

2022 short film directed by Zoel Aeschbacher

- Directed by: Zoel Aeschbacher
- Written by: Zoel Aeschbacher; Gania Latroche
- Produced by: Nelson Ghrénassia; Elena Tatti
- Starring: Pierre Gommé; Pascal Tagnati; Dorin Dragos
- Edited by: Youri Tchao Debats
- Music by: Mario Batkovic
- Release date: August 2022
- Running time: 17mn
- Countries: France; Switzerland

Fairplay is a 2022 French-Swiss short film directed by Zoel Aeschbacher. The seventeen-minute short about extreme competition premiered at the 75th Locarno Film Festival. The film has been presented in numerous international film festivals, including the Regard Saguenay International Short Film Festival and the 2023 Clermont-Ferrand Film Festival, where it won the Special Jury Prize. Fairplay was amongst the five shorts nominated for the 2023 Quartz Award (Swiss Film Awards).

== Plot ==
Three characters – a teenager, a blue-collar worker, and a senior executive – take part in competitions hoping to turn their lives around and heading instead towards an inevitable crash.

== Reception ==
Since its launch, the film has been selected in various festivals and academies around the world:

Year	Festivals	Award/Category	Status
2022	Locarno Film Festival	Cinema Youth Jury Award	Won
2022	Festival international du cinema francophone en Acadie	Prix la Vague for Best International Short Film	Won
2022	Festival International de Film Saint-Jean-de-Luz	Young Jury Prize for Best Short Film	Won
2022	Festival International de Film Saint-Jean-de-Luz	Jury Prize for Best Short Film	Won
2023	Swiss Film Awards	Quarz Award for Best Short Film	Nominated
2023	Regard: Saguenay International Short Film Festival	Grand Prix - International Competition	Nominated
2023	Norwegian Short Film Festival	Golden Chair Award for Best International Short Film	Nominated
2023	Clermont-Ferrand International Short Film Festival	Special Jury Prize - National Competition	Won
2023	Cinema Jove - Valencia International Film Festival	Moon of Valencia for Best Short Film	Nominated
2023	Cortisonici Film Festival	Best Short Film	Won
