= Rule 34 (film) =

2022 film by Julia Murat

- Theatrical release poster
- Portuguese: Regra 34
- Directed by: Júlia Murat
- Written by: Gabriela Capello; Julia Murat; Rafael Lessa; Roberto Winter
- Produced by: Julia Murat; Tatiana Leite
- Starring: Sol Miranda; Lucas Andrade; Lorena Comparato; Isabela Mariotto
- Cinematography: Léo Bittencourt
- Edited by: Beatriz Pomar; Julia Murat; Mair Tavares
- Music by: Lucas Marcier; Maria Berlado
- Production companies: Esquina Filmes; Bubbles Project; Still Moving
- Distributed by: Imovision (Brazil); Wayna Pitch (France)
- Release dates: 10 August 2022 (Locarno); 19 January 2023 (Brazil); 7 June 2023 (France)
- Running time: 100 minutes
- Countries: Brazil; France
- Language: Portuguese

Rule 34 (Portuguese: Regra 34) is a 2022 drama film co-written and directed by Júlia Murat and starring Sol Miranda. The film is named after the Internet phenomenon Rule 34. It follows a young law student who develops a passion for defending women in abuse cases. At the same time, her own sexual interests lead her into a world dominated by violence and eroticism.

A co-production between Brazil and France, the film premiered at the 75th Locarno Film Festival on 10 August 2022, where it won the Golden Leopard for Best Film. It was released theatrically in Brazil on 19 January 2023 by Imovision and in France on 7 June 2023 by Wayna Pitch.

== Cast ==
- Sol Miranda as Simone
- Lucas Andrade as Coyote
- Lorena Comparato as Lucia
- Isabela Mariotto as Nat
- Babu Santana as André
- MC Carol as Nill

== Production ==
=== Development ===
Rule 34 is the third feature film by Brazilian director and screenwriter Julia Murat. The film's title refers to the so-called Rule 34, an Internet maxim which asserts that Internet pornography exists concerning every conceivable topic. The project was part of the 2019 Berlinale Co-Production Market. Murat wrote the screenplay along with Gabriela Capello, Rafael Lessa and Roberto Winter.

=== Filming ===
Filming took place in 2019. However, the pandemic caused a 10-month delay in post-production. Lacking the funds to complete the film (due to the cessation of cultural funding under former President Bolsonaro), Murat received a grant in July 2021 as part of the Gothenburg Film Festival. Funding was provided by the festival's Audiovisual Fund, set up at the initiative of the Swedish government to protect democracy around the world. The film was also funded by FSA and Visions Sud Est.

== Release ==
Rule 34 premiered at the 75th Locarno Film Festival on 10 August 2022, where it won the Golden Leopard for Best Film. It was also screened in the World Cinema section of the 27th Busan International Film Festival on 8 October 2022 and at the 28th Kolkata International Film Festival on 22 December 2022. It has been screened at over 50 festivals worldwide, earning more than 10 awards. The film was released theatrically in Brazil on 19 January 2023 by Imovision and in France on 7 June 2023 by Wayna Pitch and in Germany by Busch Media.

== Reception ==
=== Critical response ===
Independent Swiss journalist Michael Sennhauser described Rule 34 as "a playful, cleverly argued film with a clear provocative twist" and commented that, as with the competition entry Tengo sueños eléctricos, which received three awards in Locarno, the film "clearly plays a role" that there is a female director behind the work. "Precisely because it [the film] moves in this area where personal freedom only works as long as they mutually agree that encroachment is negotiable", stated Sennhauser. Neil Young of Screen Daily dubbed it a "surprise winner". It is "a fascinating and ambitious third feature film" and "a sensual, intimate character study" by Murat. Newcomer Sol Miranda put on a "strong central performance" by a "multifaceted black woman [...] in bustling Rio de Janeiro." With her play, she penetrates the didactic tendencies of the screenplay and the theoretical treatises disguised as dialogue. Young, however, criticized the "stylistically conventional" images by cinematographer Leo Bittencourt in comparison to the red-hot topics dealt with, which are kept "pervasively flat in TV style" and would therefore hardly lose their impact on the small screen. Lead actress Miranda shows a "convincing range of emotions" and the close-up is reminiscent of Greta Garbo in Queen Christine (1933), Bob Hoskins in The Long Good Friday (1980) and Mia Farrow in The Purple Rose of Cairo (1985). The French newspaper Le Monde called the film "a complex, powerful and sensual portrait of a woman, the like of which has rarely been seen in cinema".

=== Accolades ===
Year	Award	Category	Recipient(s)	Result	Ref(s)
2022	75th Locarno Film Festival	Golden Leopard	Rule 34	Won	
2022	24th Festival do Rio	Best Director	Julia Murat	Won	
2022	Huelva Ibero-American Film Festival	Best Actress	Sol Miranda	Won	
2022	Festival Internacional del Nuevo Cine Latinoamericano de Habana	Jury Special Prize	Rule 34	Won	
2022	Panorama Coisa de Cinema	Special Mention	Rule 34	Won	
2022	Panorama Coisa de Cinema	APC Jury Special Prize	Rule 34	Won	
2022	Festival des Trois Continents	Special mention to the actress	Sol Miranda	Won	
2022	MixBrasil Festival	Best actress	Sol Miranda	Won	
2023	Zinegoak - Bilbao's International GayLesboTrans Film and Performing Arts Festival	Best actress	Sol Miranda	Won	
2023	Zinegoak - Bilbao's International GayLesboTrans Film and Performing Arts Festival	Best Feature Film	Rule 34	Won	
2023	Mezipatra Queer Film Festival	Main Jury Special Mention	Rule 34	Won	
2023	Queer Lisboa	Best Feature Film	Rule 34	Won	
