= Transylvania (film) =

- Directed by: Tony Gatlif; Mircea Drăgan; Horațiu Mălăele
- Written by: Tony Gatlif
- Produced by: Frank Mancuso Jr. Tara L. Craig; Mircea Drăgan; Mihai Iacob
- Starring: Asia Argento; Amira Casar; Birol Ünel
- Cinematography: Céline Bozon
- Edited by: Monique Dartonne
- Music by: Tony Gatlif; Delphine Mantoulet
- Distributed by: Peccadillo Pictures (UK)
- Release dates: 28 May 2006 (Cannes); 10 August 2007 (UK)
- Running time: 103 minutes
- Country: France
- Languages: Italian; French; Hungarian; Romanian; English

Transylvania is a 2006 French drama film starring Asia Argento. In 2006, Director Tony Gatlif and composer Delphine Mantoulet won the Georges Delerue Prize at Film Fest Gent for the score, and Gatlif was nominated for the Grand Prix award. Transylvania premiered at the 2006 Cannes Film Festival in France on 28 May, and premiered in the United States on 16 March 2007 at the Cleveland International Film Festival and in the United Kingdom at the Cambridge Film Festival on 6 July 2007 (with a later theatrical release on 10 August 2007).

== Plot ==
Zingarina (Asia Argento), a rebellious Italian girl who travels to Transylvania with her best friend Marie (Amira Casar) and a young interpreter, Luminita (Alexandra Beaujard), seeking her fiancee and father of the baby she's expecting, Milan Agustin (Morgan), who has been expelled from France, the country where they had met and fallen in love. She knows he's a travelling musician and plays in a gypsy band. Zingarina finds Milan at the winter "Herod's Carnaval" (Festival of customs and traditions) but he tells her that their love story is over. The girl, angry and crushed, doesn't want to return to France or Italy. Marie is angry too so she fires Luminita because she thinks they have to leave from Transylvania.

Zingarina exploits a temporary absence of Marie (the woman was at a phone-cabine) for running away from her (leaving a note only), in order to go after Vandana, a vagrant little girl. In her aimless travel through the boulevards and the villages, Zingarina meets Tchangalo (Birol Unel), a charming travelling merchant of Turkish descent. Between them there's a kind of comprehension and solidarity; then a love feeling. Even if Tchangalo is a man without borders and without ties, he accepts Zingarina (even the idea of forming a family with her); Tchangalo also accepts Zingarina's baby, even if he's not his natural son.

== Cast ==
- Asia Argento as Zingarina
- Amira Casar as Marie
- Birol Ünel as Tchangalo
- Alexandra Beaujard as Luminitsa
- Marco Castoldi as Milan Agustin
- Bea Palya as the cabaret singer (as Beáta Palya)
- Rares Budileanu as the young musician
- Gabor as Gabor, the peasant at the sled
