= Shine Your Eyes =

2020 drama film

- Film poster
- Portuguese: Cidade Pássaro
- Directed by: Matias Mariani
- Written by: Chika Anadu; Francine Barbosa; Maíra Bühler; Matias Mariani; Júlia Murat; Chioma Thompson; Roberto Winter
- Starring: O.C. Ukeje; Paolo André; Barry Igujie
- Production companies: February Films; MPM Film; Primo Filmes
- Distributed by: Netflix
- Release dates: February 2020 (Berlin); July 29, 2020
- Running time: 102 minutes
- Countries: Brazil; France
- Languages: Igbo; Portuguese; English; Hungarian; Chinese

Shine Your Eyes (Portuguese: Cidade Pássaro, lit. 'Bird City') is a 2020 drama film directed by Matias Mariani written by Chika Anadu, Francine Barbosa, Maíra Bühler, Matias Mariani, Júlia Murat, Chioma Thompson and Roberto Winter and starring O.C. Ukeje, Paolo André and Barry Igujie.

The film premiered in the Panorama portion of the 70th Berlin International Film Festival. As of October 2020, all ten reviews compiled by Rotten Tomatoes are positive, with an average rating of 7.19/10. The film was made available worldwide through the Netflix streaming services.

== Cast ==
- OC Ukeje as Amadi Igbomaeze
- Paolo André as Miro Kuzko
- Barry Igujie
- Chukwudi Iwuji as Ikenna
- Indira Nascimento as Emilia
- Yasmin Thin Qi
- Oula Alsaghir as Aya
- Alassana as Balde
- Hadand Bene
- Gabriel Ebuka
- Mike Indigo
- Max Lund as Emeka Ogboh

== Release ==
Shine Your Eyes was released on July 29, 2020, on Netflix.

== Reception ==
On review aggregator Rotten Tomatoes, the film has an approval rating of 100% based on 10 reviews, with an average rating of 7.2/10. Metacritic, which uses a weighted average, assigned the film a score of 79 out of 100, based on 5 critics, indicating "generally favorable" reviews.
