= Lipowy Dwór =

- Village
- Location within Poland
- Coordinates: 53°57′52″N 21°54′32″E
- Country: Poland
- Voivodeship: Warmian-Masurian
- County: Giżycko
- Gmina: Miłki
- Population: 80

Lipowy Dwór [liˈpɔvɨ ˈdvur] is a village in the administrative district of Gmina Miłki, within Giżycko County, Warmian-Masurian Voivodeship, in northern Poland.

== Notable residents ==
- Paul Gratzik (born 1935), German author
