= Étienne Comar =

French film producer and screenwriter (born 1965)

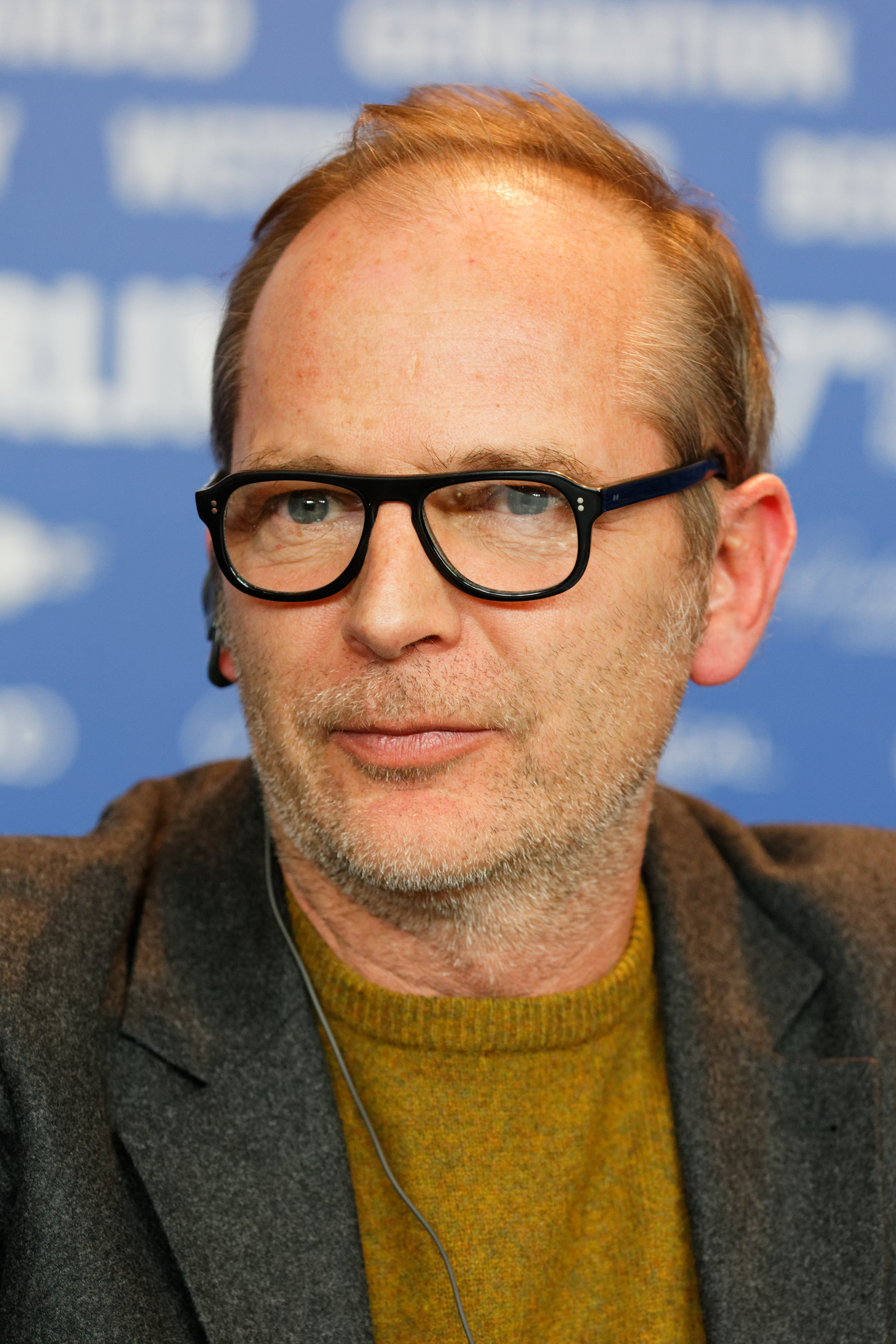
- Born: Étienne Comar in 2017; 25 January 1965 (age 60); Paris, France
- Occupation(s): Film producer, screenwriter, film director
- Years active: 1990–present

Étienne Comar (born 25 January 1965) is a French film producer, screenwriter and film director. He is known for producing the films Of Gods and Men (2010) and Timbuktu (2014), for which he won the César Award for Best Film as producer in 2011 and 2015. In 2017, his directorial debut Django was selected to open the 67th Berlin International Film Festival.

== Filmography ==
Year	Title	Credited as			Notes
Year	Title	Producer	Director	Screenwriter	Notes
1990	Babel	Yes			Short film
1991	Le Fond de l'air est frais	Yes			Short film
1997	Mektoub	Yes			
1998	Zonzon	Yes			
1999	Superlove	Yes			
1999	1999 Madeleine	Yes			
2000	Sur un air d'autoroute	Yes			
2000	Ali Zaoua	Yes			
2001	Gamer	Yes			
2002	24 Hours in the Life of a Woman	Yes			
2003	Dédales	Yes			
2005	Papa	Yes			
2005	Les Parrains	Yes			
2006	Du jour au lendemain	Yes			
2007	The Key	Yes			As associate producer
2008	Les Insoumis	Yes			As associate producer
2010	Of Gods and Men	Yes		Yes	César Award for Best Film; Nominated—César Award for Best Original Screenplay; Nominated—European Film Award for Best Film
2010	The Women on the 6th Floor	Yes			As associate producer
2012	Paris Manhattan	Yes			As associate producer
2012	Haute Cuisine	Yes		Yes	
2014	Timbuktu	Yes			César Award for Best Film
2014	The Price of Fame	Yes		Yes	
2015	Mon Roi	Yes		Yes	As co-producer
2017	Django	Yes	Yes	Yes	
2017	Gauguin			Yes	
