= Matias Mariani =

Brazilian film director, screenwriter, and producer

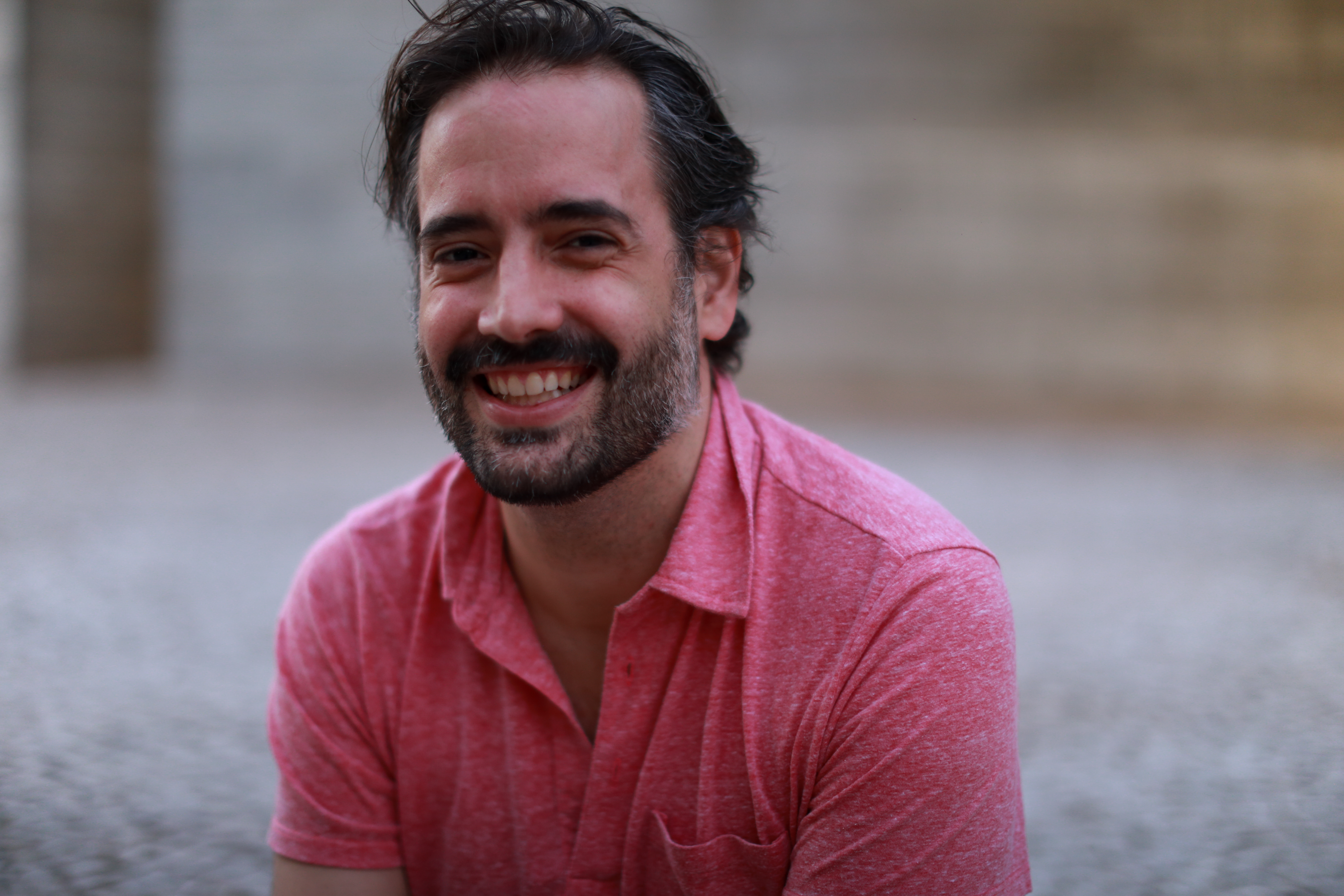
- Born: São Paulo, São Paulo (state), Brazil
- Occupations: Director; screenwriter; producer
- Children: 2

Matias Mariani is a Brazilian film director, screenwriter, and producer. He is best known for his work on the film Shine Your Eyes and documentary I Touched All Your Stuff.

== Life and career ==
Matias graduated from New York University Tisch School Of the Arts. In 2006, he co-founded the production company Primo Filmes. In 2014, he directed the documentary feature I Touched All Your Stuff, premiered at Marseille Festival of Documentary Film and Rio de Janeiro International Film Festival and it was released theatrically both in the US and Brazil. In 2020, his debut feature film Shine Your Eyes, premiered at the Panorama portion of the 70th Berlin International Film Festival and released on Netflix on July 29, 2020.

== Filmography ==
Year	Film	Director	Writer	Producer	Note
2004	O Não de São Paulo	Yes	Yes		Short film
2006	Sonhos de Peixe			Yes	Feature film
2006	Drained			Yes	Feature film
2006	Fabricando Tom Zé			Yes	Documentary
2008	Coda			Yes	Short film
2008	Cotidiano			Yes	Short film
2009	Trago Comigo		Yes	Yes	TV series
2009	O Nome do Gato			Yes	Short film
2010	Rio Sex Comedy			Yes	Feature film
2010	Cavalo			Yes	Short film
2011	Hoje			Yes	Feature film
2011	Fios de Ovos	Yes	Yes	Yes	TV movie
2012	Ela Sonhou que Eu Morri	Yes	Yes	Yes	Documentary
2012	Arapuca			Yes	Short film
2013	A Estrada 47			Yes	Feature film
2013	Enterro de Anão			Yes	Short film
2014	I Touched All Your Stuff	Yes	Yes	Yes	Documentary
2014	Trinta			Yes	Feature film
2014	Que Monstro te Mordeu?			Yes	TV series
2015	The Castle			Yes	Documentary
2015	O Porto do Rio			Yes	Documentary
2015	Marias			Yes	Documentary
2016	Tempero Secreto		Yes	Yes	TV series
2017	Pendular		Yes		Feature film
2018	Freedom is a big word			Yes	Documentary
2019	Feras			Yes	TV series
2020	Shine Your Eyes	Yes	Yes	Yes	Feature film
