= The Falconer (film) =

- Directed by: Adam Sjöberg; Seanne Winslow
- Written by: Adam Sjöberg; Seanne Winslow
- Produced by: Adam Sjöberg; Seanne Winslow; David Jacobson
- Starring: Rami Zahar; Rupert Fennessy
- Cinematography: Nicholas Bupp
- Edited by: Samuel Stewart
- Production company: Required Reading
- Release date: 2021
- Running time: 100 minutes
- Country: Oman
- Language: Arabic

The Falconer is a 2021 Omani adventure drama film written and directed by Adam Sjöberg and Seanne Winslow and starring Rami Zahar and Rupert Fennessy.

== Plot ==
Tariq and Cai are two best friends who work at a zoo. Their friendship deteriorates when Tariq decides to sell animals to the smugglers on whose money he plans to save his sister from an abusive marriage.

== Cast ==
- Rami Zahar as Tariq
- Rupert Fennessy as Cai
- Khamis al-Rawahi as Mohammed
- Noor al-Huda as Alia
- Fouad al-Hinai as Ahmed
- Abu Jinah as Abu Jinah
- Amjad Meer as Faris
- Fatma Mirza as Tutu
- Hilal al-Jabri as Hilal
- Raid al-Amari as Mo

== Reception ==
On Rotten Tomatoes, the film has an approval rating of 100 percent based on reviews from 5 critics, with an average rating of 7.3/10.

Angie Han of The Hollywood Reporter wrote "A thoughtful, if overly restrained, exploration of cultural differences between two friends".

Ali Arkani of Film Threat called it "a relatable experience where compassion and trust become the universal language of the cosmos".
