= J. P. Sniadecki =

American filmmaker (born 1979)

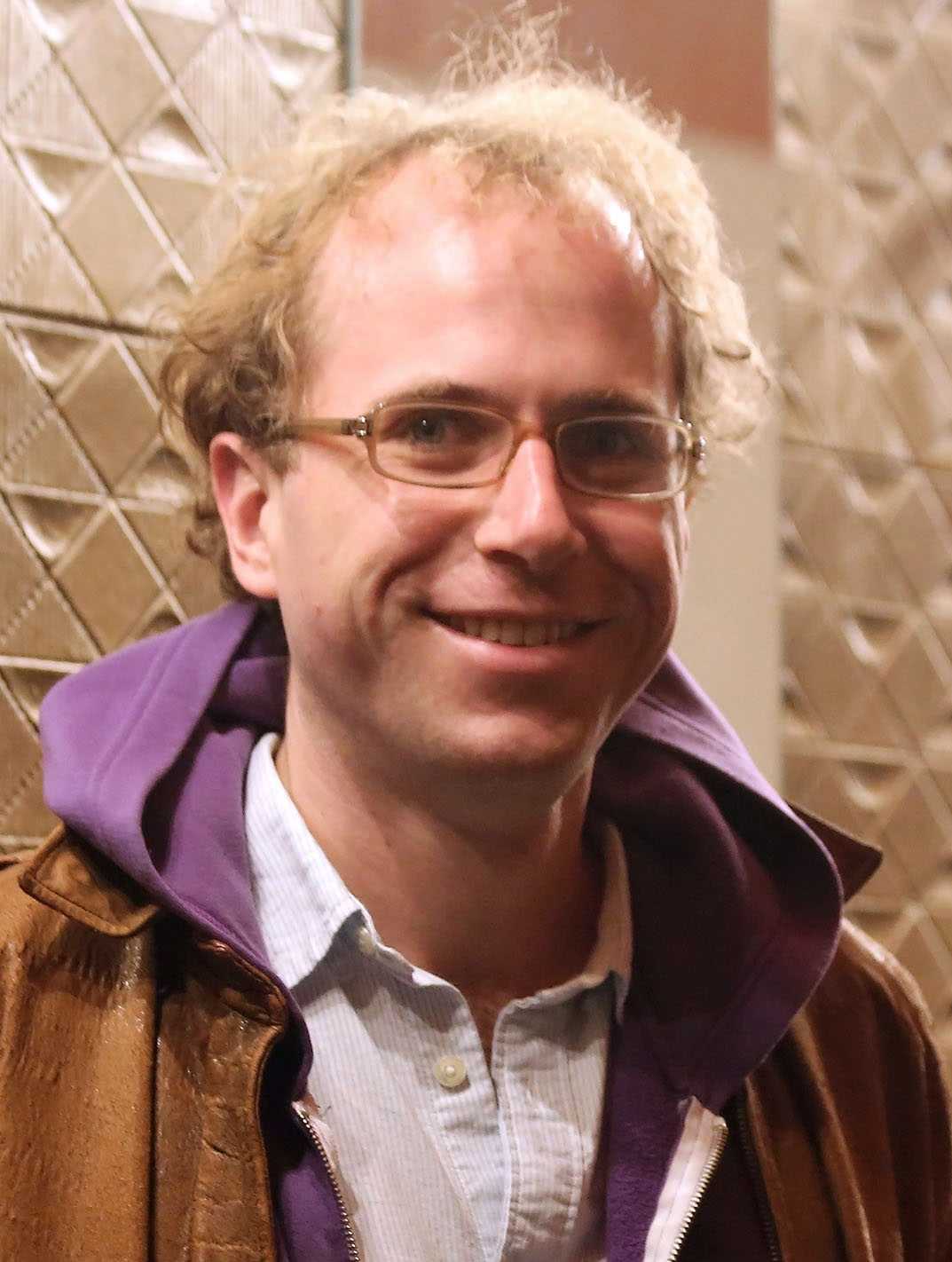
J.P. Sniadecki at the 2012 Viennale

J. P. Sniadecki (born 1979) is an American filmmaker.

== Biography ==
Sniadecki was born in 1979 in Michigan. He became interested in China through reading Chinese philosophy and first traveled there in 1999. He attended Grand Valley State University for his undergraduate studies, completing his Bachelor of Arts in philosophy and communications in 2002.

He began his graduate studies at Harvard University in 2005, where he studied under Lucien Castaing-Taylor and joined the Sensory Ethnography Lab when it was started in 2006. His short film Songhua, shot along the Songhua River a year after the Jilin chemical plant explosions, documents the relationship between local residents and the river. His 2008 film Demolition documents migrant laborers working at a demolition site in Chengdu.

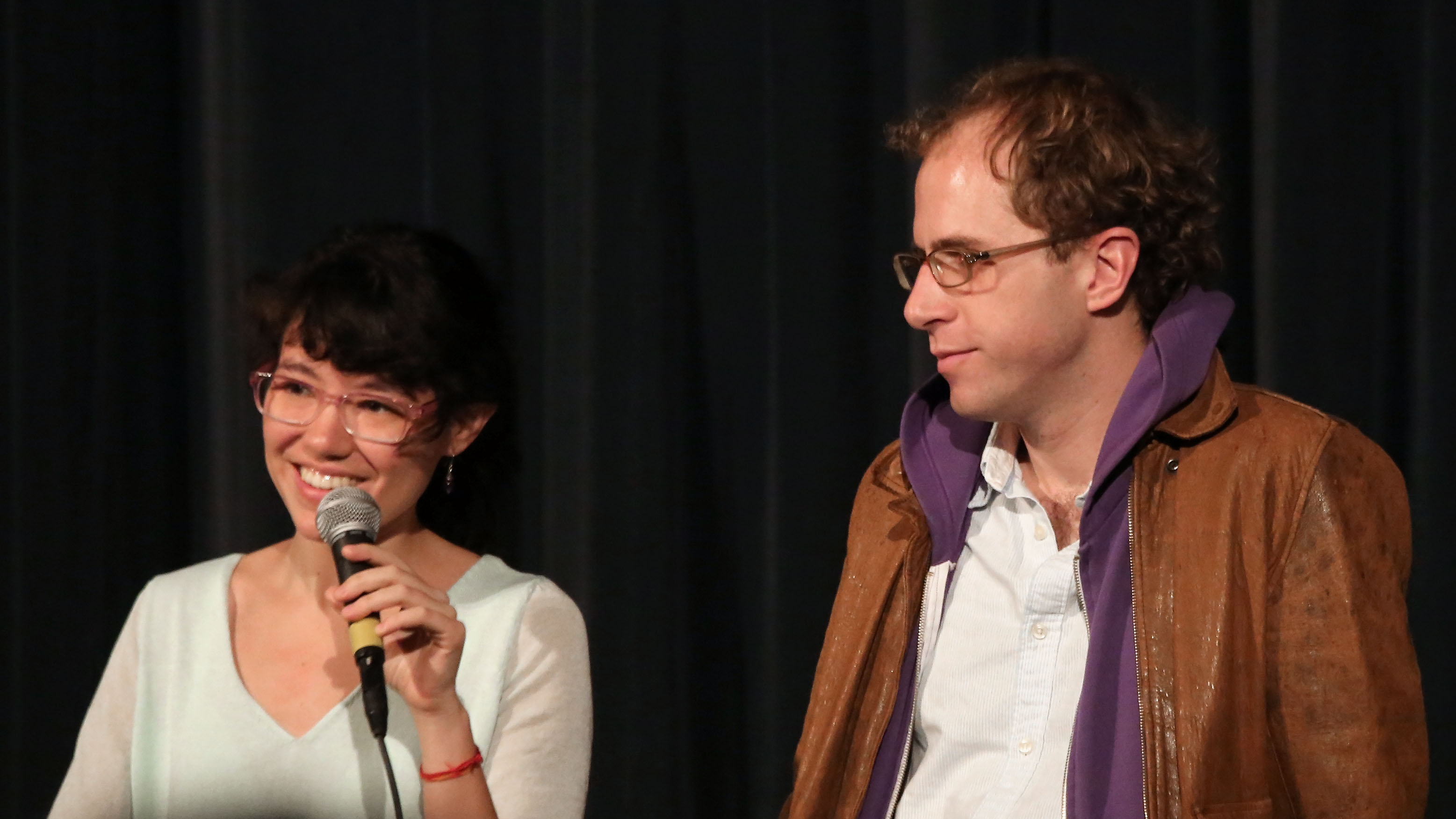
Sniadecki (right) and People's Park co-director Libbie D. Cohn (left) at a 2012 screening

Sniadecki co-directed Foreign Parts (2010) with Véréna Paravel, whose 2008 film 7 Queens informed their work. It chronicles an auto junkyard in Willets Point, Queens. His 2012 film People's Park, consisting of one long tracking shot, captures different types of activities at People's Park in Chengdu.

Sniadecki co-directed El mar la mar (2017) with Joshua Bonnetta. The film looks at the physical traces of human activity in the Sonoran Desert near the Mexico–United States border. Sniadecki was awarded a Guggenheim Fellowship in 2017. His 2020 film A Shape of Things to Come, co-directed with Lisa Malloy, follows a man named Sundog who appears in El mar la mar. It includes thermographic footage from Jason De León of the Undocumented Migration Project.

== Bibliography ==
- Balsom, Erika (2020). "To Narrate or Describe?". In Scheible, Jeff; Redrobe, Karen (eds.). Deep Mediations: Thinking Space in Cinema and Digital Cultures. University of Minnesota Press. ISBN 978-1-5179-0889-8.
- Kara, Selmin (2022). "Across the Sonorous Desert: Sounding Migration in El Mar la Mar". In Burgoyne, Robert; Bayrakdar, Deniz (eds.). Refugees and Migrants in Contemporary Film, Art and Media. Amsterdam University Press. ISBN 978-9-463-72416-6.
- MacDonald, Scott (2013). American Ethnographic Film and Personal Documentary. University of California Press. ISBN 978-0-520-27561-4.
- MacDonald, Scott (2019). The Sublimity of Document: Cinema as Diorama. Oxford University Press. ISBN 978-0-19-005212-6.
