= Paul Gratzik =

German dramatist and novelist

- Born: November 30, 1935; Lindenhof, East Prussia (present-day Lipowy Dwór, Poland)
- Died: June 18, 2018 (aged 82); Germany
- Occupations: Dramatist, novelist

Paul Gratzik (30 November 1935 – 18 June 2018) was a German dramatist and novelist. He came to wider public attention in 2011 as the subject of the documentary film Vaterlandsverräter (English translation: Enemy of the State) by Annekatrin Hendel about his past as a Stasi informer.

== Life and career ==
Gratzik was born in Lindenhof, near Lötzen in East Prussia (modern Poland), the third of six children of a farm worker. His father fell in the first days of the Second World War. Early in 1945 he, his mother, and siblings fled westwards in an ox cart, ending up in Schönberg in Mecklenburg, in what would become East Germany. After completing compulsory education, he undertook a carpentry apprenticeship from 1952 to 1954, and then did manual work in the Ruhr, in Berlin, in Weimar, and later in the brown coal open-cast mine in Schlabendorf in the Lausitz. In Berlin, he tried to complete his Abitur at evening classes.

In Weimar, in 1962, he was an official in the local Free German Youth and decided to collaborate with the Ministry for State Security (MfS or Stasi) as an informer. He also began to write.

From 1963 to 1968, Gratzik studied at the Weimar teacher training institute (de:Institut für Lehrerbildung). His first play was published in 1966. In 1968 he enrolled at the "Johannes R. Brecher" Institute for Literature at Leipzig University, a creative writing school, but after a short time, by almost unanimous vote of faculty and students, he was expelled. He then taught at a children's home in Dönschten in the Osterzgebirge.

In 1971, he began to work as a full-time writer and joined the GDR writer's guild (Deutscher Schriftstellerverband). But in 1974 he began again to work in industry, part-time, at the Dresden transformer factory. From 1977, Gratzik lived in Berlin, employed as playwright by the Berliner Ensemble. He was awarded the Heinrich Mann Prize in 1980.

In 1981, he refused all further cooperation with the MfS and confessed to his friends, amongst them Heiner Müller, that he had informed on them. He was no longer allowed to publish, and many friends shunned him. From 1984, he became an object of observation by the Stasi and experienced harassment by them.

Since the middle of the 1980s, he lived in seclusion in the Uckermark, between Templin and Prenzlau.

Gratzik's work reflects his own experiences as a manual worker under East German socialism. Although a convinced communist, his unadorned realism, and readiness to tackle taboo themes, for example the East German juvenile re-education establishments (Jugendwerkhöfe), brought him into conflict with the censors. In GDR literary circles he was, as a worker who wrote, already unusual, but his gregariousness, charisma, and magnetic effect on women, made him one of the most colourful figures.

Neither the British Library nor the German National Library list any English translations of his work.

== Works ==
(This list is taken from with some publication data added from the German Wikipedia article Paul Gratzik)

- 1965. Unruhige Tage. (Play). Leipzig: Zentralhaus für Kulturarbeit 1966
- 1968. Malwa. (Play after Maxim Gorki). Frankfurt am Main: Verlag der Autoren 1978
- 1969. Warten auf Maria. (Play).
- 1970. Umwege. Bilder aus dem Leben des jungen Motorenschlossers Michael Runna. (Play). Berlin: Henschelverlag 1970
- 1971. Der Kniebist. (Play). Hans Otto Theater, Potsdam 1971
- 1975. Märchen von einem, der auszog das Fürchten zu lernen. (Play).
- 1976. Lisa. Zwei Szenen. (Play). Frankfurt am Main: Verlag der Autoren 1979
- 1976. Handbetrieb. (Play).
- 1977. Paul Gratzik - Stücke. (Collected plays). Rostock: Hinstorff 1977
- 1977. Transportpaule. Monolog. (Novel). Rostock: Hinstorff 1977; Berlin: Rotbuch 1977
- 1980. Tschekisten. (Play).
- 1982. Kohlenkutte. (Novel). Berlin: Rotbuch 1982; Rostock: Hinstorff 1989
- 1984. Die Axt im Haus. (Play)
- 1988. Gabis Ort. (Novel, unpublished)
- 1994. Hans Wurst in Mogadischu. (Play)
- 1996. Tripolis. (Story, filmed as Landleben)
- 1997. Litauische Claviere. (Play after Bobrowski). Theater 89, Berlin 1997
- 1999. Simplizissimus. (Play after Grimmelshausen). Theater 89, Berlin 1999
- 2010. Der Führergeburtstag. (Play)

== Vaterlandsverräter film ==
Vaterlandsverräter is a 97-minute documentary film about Paul Gratzik directed by the German film maker Annekatrin Hendel, who had known Gratzik for twenty years before making the film. It premiered at the Berlinale in 2011. In 2012 it was broadcast by Arte, and in 2013 awarded a Grimme-Preis in the Information category:

Annekatrin Hendel presents her protagonist as a contradictory, sometimes challenging, sometimes repellent character. A protagonist disdaining discretion, pompous, charming, brusque. She allows him no excuses, forces him to confront his past, the while respecting him as a person. It is stimulating, even exciting, and forces the viewer to address this polarising figure, to take a position. There are hundreds of films about the GDR and the Stasi, this is one of the few that do not follow the well-trodden path of self-certainty.

— Jury, Grimme-Preis, 2013

Die Zeit, amongst others, also praised the film:

It concerns a traitor who regrets his treachery, finds the courage to confess to his friends, and now waits out his days in provincial Uckermark. Vaterlandsverräter begins to historicize the Stasi, but also to differentiate its image. It is an important film with a new angle on the subject.

The DVD of Vaterlandsverräter has English subtitles.

== Annekatrin Hendel ==
- Annekatrin Hendel
- "Annekatrin Hendel". AllMovie.
- "Annekatrin Hendel, director, Berlin". Crew United.
- "Hendel, Annekatrin". DEFA Film Library. ecommerce.umass.edu.
- Elstermann, Knut. "Portrait: Annekatrin Hendel". German Films Quarterly. Archived from the original on June 25, 2016.
- James Cleverley. Memories of the GDR (Ph.D. Thesis)
