= Jack Cahill =

Australian rules footballer

Personal information
- Full name: John Thomas Cahill
- Born: 1 June 1895; Goornong, Victoria
- Died: 9 October 1972 (aged 77); Glen Iris, Victoria
- Original team: Williamstown / Brunswick

Playing career^{1}
Years	Club	Games (Goals)
1925	Carlton	4 (3)
- ^{1} Playing statistics correct to the end of 1925.

John Thomas Cahill (1 June 1895 – 9 October 1972) was an Australian rules footballer who played with Carlton in the Victorian Football League (VFL).

Originally from Brunswick, Cahill transferred to Williamstown for the 1923 season and played 10 games without kicking a goal before crossing to Carlton Districts in 1924. From there he was recruited by Carlton the following season.
