= Júlia Murat =

Brazilian film director (born 1979)

Julia Murat
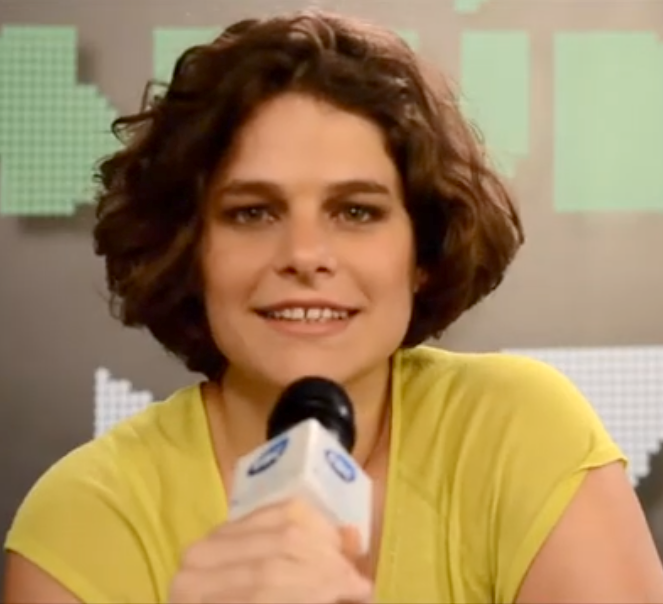
- In an EBC video in 2014
- Born: November 24, 1979 (age 46); Rio de Janeiro, Brazil
- Occupations: Film director; Writer; Film producer; Editor
- Known for: Pendular, Rule 34
- Children: 2
- Mother: Lúcia Murat

Julia Murat (born November 24, 1979) is a Brazilian film director, writer and producer. She a documentarian known for the film Found Memories, which premiered at the Venice Film Festival in 2011.

She is also known for her narrative films, like Pendular, which won the FIPRESCI Award at the Berlin International Film Festival and her film Rule 34 (2022) which won best picture at the Locarno Film Festival.

== Education ==
She attended the Federal University of Rio de Janeiro where she studied graphic design and went on to the Darcy Ribeiro Film School where she studied screenwriting.

== Career ==
Her first documentary was Dia Dos Pais [Father's Day] which she co-directed and produced with Leo Bittencourt in 2008. It premiered at Cinéma du Reel in 2008.

In 2011, she moved into fiction films. She directed and co-wrote her first narrative feature film Found Memories (Portuguese: Histórias que só Existem Quando Lembradas, 2011) in 2011. It premiered at the Venice Film Festival and was reviewed positively by critics. In his review, A.O. Scott of The New York Times described Murat as "an unobtrusive observer with a strong and confident visual sense."

In 2017, she released her second narrative feature film, Pendular, which won the FIPRESCI Award at the Berlin International Film Festival. Murat co-wrote the film with her partner Matias Mariani, about two artists trying to navigate their lives together. The film was praised by The New York Times and the newspaper listed Murat as a filmmaker to watch. That same year, she also released the documentary Law and Order Assurance Operations (Operações de Garantia Da Lei E Da Ordem) (2017).

In 2020, Murat continued her writing collaborations with Matias Mariani, and was a co-writer on his film Shine Your Eyes.

In 2022, she released her feature film Rule 34 (2022) at the Locarno Film Festival where it won the Golden Leopard for best film. Murat sees the film as an interweaving of sex and politics and said she developed the main character, Simone, by listening to former pornographic actress Sasha Grey discuss the risk and limits inherent in making pornography.

== Personal life ==
As of 2017, she was in a six-year relationship with Brazilian filmmaker Matias Mariani. The couple have two children together. Her mother is Brazilian filmmaker, Lúcia Murat.

== Filmography ==
=== Feature films ===
Year	Title	Director	Writer	Editor
2022	Rule 34	Yes	Yes	Yes
2020	Shine Your Eyes	No	Yes	No
2017	Operações de garantia da lei e da ordem	Yes	No	No
2017	Pendular	Yes	Yes	No
2015	O Porto do Rio	No	No	Yes
2013	Satellites	No	No	Yes
2012	Os Dias com Ele	No	No	Yes
2011	Found Memories	Yes	Yes	No
2008	Dia Dos Pais [Father's Day]	Yes	Yes	Yes
2007	Vinícius D'Black and Cristina Lago in Another Love Story	No	No	Yes
2006	Navegaramazônia – Uma Viagem com Jorge Mautner	No	No	Yes
2006	The Foreign Eye	No	No	Yes

=== Short films ===
Year	Title	Director	Writer	Editor
2014	Sobre Papeis (short)	No	No	Yes
2011	Gisela (short)	No	No	Yes
2010	Passeio de Família (short)	No	No	Yes
2009	Pendular (short)	Yes	No	Yes
2007	Ok (short)	No	No	Yes
2004	Ausência (short)	Yes	No	Yes
