= Armand Amar =

French composer

- Born: 1953 (age 72–73); Jerusalem
- Genres: Film score; contemporary classical; world; ambient
- Occupation: Composer
- Years active: 1994–present
- Labels: Naïve; Long Distance; Femios; Universal
- Website: armandamar.com

Armand Amar (born 1953 in Jerusalem (Palestine)) is a French composer, who grew up in Morocco. He won the 2010 César Award for Best Original Music for Le Concert (Radu Mihăileanu).

== Life and career ==
Armand Amar is a French composer living in Paris. In 1968, he began playing the congas. He also practiced the tabla and the zarb in the following years.

In 1976 he met South African choreographer Peter Goss, who introduced him to dance. In the subsequent years, he worked with a number of choreographers in contemporary dance.

His works are focused particularly on Eastern music. He is the author of several ballets and soundtracks films such as The Trail, Days of Glory, Live and Become, The First Cry, Earth from Above, Bab'Aziz and Home. Since Amen., he has also collaborated with Costa-Gavras scoring all of his subsequent films.

He founded the label Long Distance in 1994 with his partners Alain Weber and Peter Gabriel.

== Compositions ==
=== Films ===
- 2002: Amen. by Costa-Gavras
- 2004: Earth from Above by Renaud Delourme
- 2004: Tabous (Zohre & Manouchehr) by Mitra Farahani
- 2005: Live and Become by Radu Mihăileanu
- 2005: The Axe by Costa-Gavras
- 2006: La Piste by Éric Valli
- 2006: Bab'Aziz by Nacer Khémir
- 2006: Days of Glory by Rachid Bouchareb
- 2006: Blame It on Fidel by Julie Gavras
- 2007: Summer of '62 by Mehdi Charef
- 2007: The Colonel by Laurent Herbiet
- 2007: The First Cry by Gilles de Maistre
- 2007: Comme ton père by Marco Carmel
- 2008: La Jeune Fille et les Loups by Gilles Legrand
- 2008: Sagan by Diane Kurys
- 2009: Welcome by Philippe Lioret
- 2009: Eden Is West by Costa-Gavras
- 2009: Moi, Van Gogh by Peter Knapp and François Bertrand
- 2009: Home by Yann Arthus-Bertrand
- 2009: Le Concert by Radu Mihăileanu
- 2009: London River de Rachid Bouchareb
- 2010: Comme les cinq doigts de la main by Alexandre Arcady
- 2010: Ao: The Last Hunter by Jacques Malaterre
- 2010: Outside the Law by Rachid Bouchareb
- 2011: You Will Be My Son by Gilles Legrand
- 2011: Free Men by Ismaël Ferroukhi
- 2011: The Source by Radu Mihăileanu
- 2012: Ce que le jour doit à la nuit by Alexandre Arcady
- 2012: Capital by Costa-Gavras
- 2012: Mon bel oranger by Marcos Bernstein
- 2012: Planet Ocean by Yann Arthus-Bertrand and Michael Pitiot
- 2012: Amazonia Eterna by Belisario Franca
- 2013: For a Woman by Diane Kurys
- 2013: Belle and Sebastian by Nicolas Vanier
- 2013: A Thousand Times Good Night by Erik Poppe
- 2014: Red Line by Andrea Kalinl
- 2014: The Nightingale by Philippe Muyl
- 2014: 24 Days by Alexandre Arcady
- 2014: Cartoonists - Foot Soldiers of Democracy by Stéphanie Valloatto
- 2015: L'Odeur de la mandarine by Gilles Legrand
- 2015: Belle & Sebastian: The Adventure Continues by Christian Dugay
- 2015: Human by Yann Arthus-Bertrand
- 2015: Lake Como by Yann Arthus-Bertrand
- 2016: The History of Love by Radu Mihăileanu
- 2017: L'école buissonnière by Nicolas Vanier
- 2018: Mia and the White Lion by Gilles de Maistre
- 2018: Belle and Sebastien: Friends for Life by Clovis Cornillac

=== Television ===
- 1997: Miracle in the Eldorado (Philippe Niang)
- 2006: Earth from Above (Yann Arthus-Bertrand)
- 2007: Marie Humbert, the secret of a parent (Marc Angelo)
- 2009: Great Reporters (Gilles de Maistre)
- 2009: London River (Rachid Bouchareb)
- 2010: Marion Mazzano (Marc Angelo)
- 2011: Voir le pays du matin calme (Gilles de Maistre)
- 2013: Crime d'état (Pierre Aknine)
- 2014: Ce soir je vais tuer l'assassin de mon fils (Pierre Aknine)
- 2014: Jusqu'au dernier (François Velle)
- 2015: No Second Chance (François Velle)

=== Other creations ===
- 1976 à 1991: musiques de ballet pour le chorégraphe sud-africain Peter Goss
  - 1976: "Entre l'air et l'eau" au théâtre des Champs-Élysées, puis est présentée au Festival d'Avignon et au Festival d'Apt.
  - 1978: "Sable mouvant" est créé au Théâtre des Champs-Élysées.
  - 1979: "A transformation mystery" au Théâtre de la Bastille puis au Festival de Vienne.
  - 1980: "Quatuor et Side by side" au Théâtre Mogador
  - 1981: "Marécage" au Théâtre de la Porte Saint-Martin, Festival de Montpellier, Festival de Toulon, Festival d'Annecy, Festival de la Culture Juive.
  - 1982: "Below and Above"; créé dans le cadre du Festival des Bouffes du Nord.
  - 1983: "L'aube portée par les ailes du vent"; Théâtre de la porte Saint-Martin – Festival de Turin.
  - 1984: "Ties" pour le Théâtre des Amandiers à Nanterre
  - 1985: "Seajoy et Gamos" dans le cadre du Festival d'Automne au Centre Georges Pompidou
  - 1986: "Aller-retour" et "Y"; Festival de Turin, Tournées en Argentine, Espagne, Italie, Allemagne.
  - 1987: "Steellight"; Biennale du Val-de-Marne.
  - 1988: "Le Pouvoir du silence"; Festival Vignale Danza.
  - 1989: "Circumanbulatoire" à Choisy-le-Roi. Tournées en Italie et à la Réunion.
  - 1990: "Le Poids des anges"; Festival de Caseres.
  - 1991: "Arbre de pluie"; Allemagne, Italie, Belgique...
- 1987 à 1998: Musiques pour des spectacles de la Cathédrale d'Images aux Baux-de-Provence (ces 5 spectacles ont été réalisés par Hans-Walter Müller):
  - 1987: Hymne à la Vie
  - 1992: Les Portes de l'Europe
  - 1993: Les Forêts de l'Espoir
  - 1995: L'Or des Alpilles
  - 1997: Images Paroles du Monde
- 1992: "The Other Side" au Conservatoire national supérieur de Paris
- 1994 à 1996: "Nomades Dance" et "Paroles d'Anges" avec les musiciens du Rajasthan et les gitans de Perpignan pour Montpellier danse et la biennale de Lyon
- 1997 à 2001: création pour Philippe Talard au théâtre national de Mannheim
- 2005: Inanna, un ballet de Carolyn Carlson
- 2006: Souviens toi de Marie-Claude Pietragalla et Julien Derouault
- 2009: Marco Polo de Marie-Claude Pietragalla et Julien Derouault
- 2010: Bande annonce du Printemps du cinéma (extrait de la bande son du film The First Cry).
- 2010: Bande annonce de La rentrée du cinéma (extrait de la bande son du film La Jeune Fille et les Loups).
- 2011: Leylâ et Majnűn, ou l'amour mystique; oratorio Mundi pour 40 musiciens et chanteurs. Il est interprété au Festival de Fès des Musiques Sacrées du Monde le 3 juin 2011 et à la Salle Pleyel en avril 2014.
- 2014: Falen pour le Ballet Boy, danse
- 2014: Steel par Russel Maliphant, danse
- 2014: pixel par Mourad Merzouki, danse

== Awards ==
=== Awards ===
- 2009: IFMCA Award for Best Original Score for a Documentary Feature Film for Home (Yann Arthus-Bertrand)
- 2010: Gopo Award for Best Music for Le Concert (Radu Mihăileanu)
- 2010: César Award for Best Original Music for Le Concert (Radu Mihăileanu)
- 2014: Amanda Award for Best Score for A Thousand Times Good Night (Erik Poppe)

=== Nominations ===
- 2003: César Award for Best Original Music for Amen. (Costa-Gavras)
- 2006: César Award for Best Original Music for Live and Become (Radu Mihăileanu)
- 2007: César Award for Best Original Music for Days of Glory (Rachid Bouchareb)
- 2007: IFMCA Award for Best Original Score for a Documentary Feature Film for The First Cry (Gilles de Maistre)
- 2015: IFMCA Award for Best Original Score for a Documentary for Human (Yann Arthus-Bertrand)
