= Human (2015 film) =

- Official Poster
- Directed by: Yann Arthus-Bertrand
- Produced by: Humankind Production
- Edited by: Françoise Bernard; Anne-Marie Sangla
- Music by: Armand Amar
- Release date: 12 September 2015
- Running time: 188 minutes
- Country: France

Human is a 2015 documentary by French environmentalist Yann Arthus-Bertrand. The film is almost entirely composed of exclusive aerial footage and first-person stories told into the camera. It was the first film to premiere in the General Assembly Hall of the United Nations, to an audience of 1,000 viewers, including the UN Secretary General Ban Ki-moon.

The film was financed by the Bettencourt Schueller Foundation, which gave it rights-free to the GoodPlanet Foundation, responsible for driving the project. An extended version of the film is officially freely available on YouTube (in three parts).

== Production ==
Human was produced over a period of three years, with director Yann Arthus-Bertrand and a team of 20 people interviewing more than 2000 people in 60 countries. The crew included five journalists and cameramen with a "fixer" in each location for organizing things and four people responsible for receiving and sorting the material. The aerial crew had 6 people including Arthus-Bertrand.

Each person interviewed was asked the same set of forty questions and was presented on a plain black background without any musical score or any details about their identity and locale. Arthus-Bertrand hoped that removing personal identifiers would draw focus to our similarities, explaining that they "... wanted to concentrate on what we all share. If you put the name of a person, or what country they’re from, you don’t feel that as strongly".

== Distribution and promotion ==
According to the film's website, its distribution is designed to be made under "the freest conditions to the widest possible audience." On 12 September 2015, the film was screened simultaneously at the United Nations, at the Biennale del cinema in Venice and on YouTube. It was also premiered in over 400 screens in France on the same day. Google, the exclusive digital partner of the film, made the film accessible worldwide on YouTube in six languages: English, Russian, Spanish, Portuguese, Arabic and French.

The film was released in 11 different variations, including a theatrical version, a web version in three parts, a music version, TV episodic cuts and behind-the-scenes footage available on YouTube.

== Awards ==
At the 2016 Vancouver International Film Festival, Human won the award for Most Popular International Documentary (based on audience balloting).

== Critical response ==
The film was generally well received by critics who praised its unprecedented scale and coverage of topics such as family, religion, ambition, failure, homosexuality, war and poverty. The film was also praised for the truth and brutal honesty behind the people's stories as well as Arthus-Bertrand's artistry in contrasting the subjects with aerial shots that are infused with motion, color and people. However, film critic Guy Lodge criticized the movie for its arduous three-hour length, saying that "... these stories retain little individual power or resonance, while the pic’s sporadic interludes of lush landscape lensing risk aestheticizing the personal struggles in question".

== See also ==
- Home - a 2009 movie by Yann Arthus-Bertrand
- Planet Ocean - a 2012 movie by Yann Arthus-Bertrand and Michael Pitiot
