= Hana Yoshida =

Japanese figure skater (born 2005)

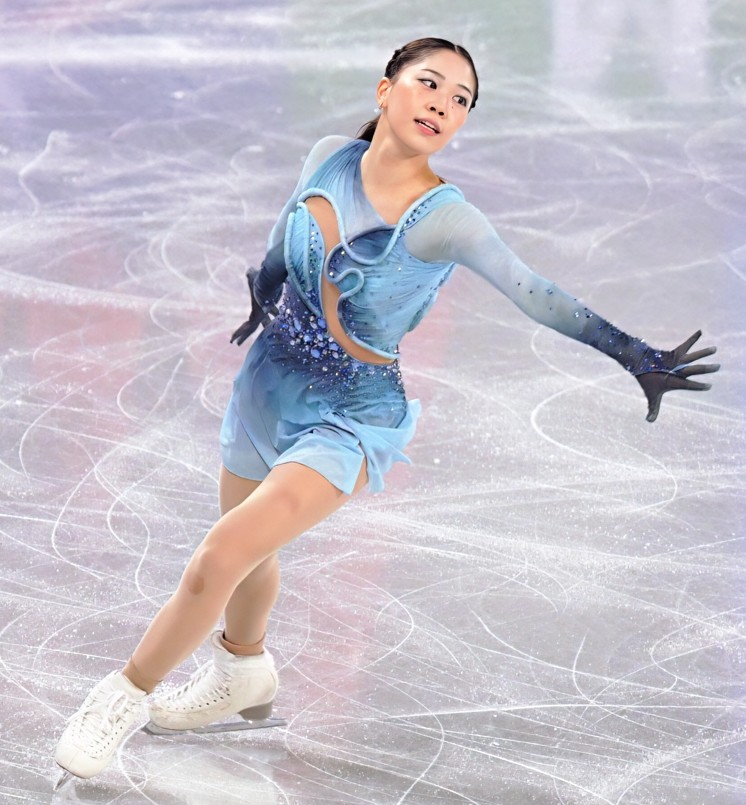
- Yoshida during the short program at the 2024–25 Grand Prix Final

Personal information
- Native name: 吉田 陽菜
- Other names: Hanna
- Born: August 21, 2005 (age 21) Nagoya, Aichi, Japan
- Home town: Uji, Kyoto, Japan
- Height: 1.55 m (5 ft 1 in)

Figure skating career
- Country: Japan
- Discipline: Women's singles
- Coach: Mie Hamada; Hiroaki Sato; Satsuki Muramoto
- Skating club: Kinoshita Academy
- Began skating: 2012
- Retired: March 31, 2026

Medal record
Grand Prix Final
Bronze medal – third place	2023–24 Beijing	Singles

Hana Yoshida (吉田 陽菜, Yoshida Hana; born August 21, 2005) is a Japanese retired figure skater. She is the 2023–24 ISU Grand Prix Final bronze medalist, the 2025 Asian Winter Games bronze medalist, a three-time ISU Grand Prix medalist (2 gold, 1 bronze), and two-time ISU Challenger Series medalist (1 silver, 1 bronze).

At the junior level, she is a two-time ISU Junior Grand Prix gold medalist and a two-time Japanese Junior medalist. Yoshida is the nineteenth woman to successfully land a triple Axel in international competition.

== Personal life ==
Yoshida was born on August 21, 2005, in Nagoya, Aichi, Japan.

As a child, she attended an international school where she learned how to speak English fluently. In 2024, Yoshida graduated from Chukyo High School before enrolling into Doshisha University to study the Faculty of Global and Regional Studies. In addition, she also studies French at the university.

Her figure skating idol is Mao Asada.

== Career ==
=== Early years ===
Yoshida began skating in 2012 after following her older sister into the sport. She placed ninth at the 2015 Japan Novice B National Championships but won the category the next year.

=== 2017–18 season ===
Yoshida won the 2017 Japan Novice National Championships and was invited to compete at the 2017 Japan National Championships. She placed eighth overall. She was also invited to skate in the gala at the 2017 NHK Trophy as the 2017 Japanese national novice champion.

Yoshida was sent to the 2018 Challenge Cup, winning the advanced novice ladies ahead of Alysa Liu of United States.

=== 2018–19 season ===
In August 2018, Yoshida competed at the 2018 Asian Open Trophy. She attempted the triple Axel in the free program but fell, ranking third overall.

=== 2019–20 season ===
Yoshida competed at the 2019 Japan Junior National Championships. She placed tenth in the short program. However, Yoshida landed a clean triple Axel in the free and won the bronze medal. Due to the results, she was invited to compete at the senior division. Yoshida finished in nineteenth place.

=== 2020–21 season ===
The 2020–21 Junior Grand Prix circuit was cancelled due to the COVID-19 pandemic. Yoshida was then invited to compete at the 2020 Japan Open as part of Team Blue. She attempted the triple Axel unsuccessfully. She won the silver medal at the 2020 Japan Junior Nationals behind Rino Matsuike, then placing sixteenth at the senior event.

=== 2021–22 season ===
Yoshida placed fourth at the 2021 Japan Junior National Championships. She was invited to the senior event because the junior champion Mao Shimada was too young to compete. She placed ninth overall.

Yoshida attended the 2022 Bavarian Open to compete in the Junior Women II category. She placed first in the short even though she popped the planned triple flip. Yoshida landed a clean triple Axel in the free skate, becoming the nineteenth woman to land the jump in an international competition successfully. She won over Japan's Rinka Watanabe. Also eligible to compete at the senior level, she was sent to 2022 Egna Spring Trophy. Yoshida landed the triple Axel in the short and another one in the free, but the jump was landed on the quarter. She won by outscoring South Korea's Lee Hae-in by 28.45 points.

=== 2022–23 season: Junior Grand Prix debut ===
In August 2022, Yoshida debuted on the Junior Grand Prix at the 2022 JGP France in Courchevel. In her short program, she underrotated both jumps in her combination but otherwise gave a clean skate which placed her second behind her teammate Ayumi Shibayama and earned her the highest program components score awarded in that segment of the competition. During the free skate, Yoshida successfully landed a triple Axel but stepped out after the landing. Although her triple flip's edge was marked as unclear, and the first jump in her triple Lutz-triple toe combination was underrotated by a quarter, she had no falls, and the program was otherwise clean. She won the event with a lead of 15.13 points over Shibayama, who finished in second place. Yoshida became the first Japanese woman to win a Junior Grand Prix competition since Rika Kihira in 2016. Yoshida was initially scheduled to compete at the Armenian stop on the Junior Grand Prix circuit. However, when that was cancelled due to the September conflict between Azerbaijan and Armenia, she was reassigned elsewhere. Yoshida won a second gold medal at the 2022 JGP Italy, in the process qualifying for the 2022–23 Junior Grand Prix Final.

Yoshida entered the Final in Turin as a medal favourite after winning both of her qualifying events, but she finished sixth of sixth skaters in the short program after falling on her jump combination, which she called "very disappointing." The free skate proved no better, opening with a fall on an underrotated triple Axel and going on to make several other jump errors, including a singled attempt at a triple Lutz. She was again last in the segment and last overall.

Competing at the senior 2022–23 Japan Championships, Yoshida erred on two jumps in the short program, placing fourteenth in that segment. In the free skate she successfully landed a triple Axel and seven other triple jumps, placing third in that segment and rising to sixth overall. She was assigned to compete at the 2023 Four Continents Championships. Yoshida went on to finish eighth at the Four Continents Championships.

=== 2023–24 season: Grand Prix debut and Grand Prix Final bronze medal ===
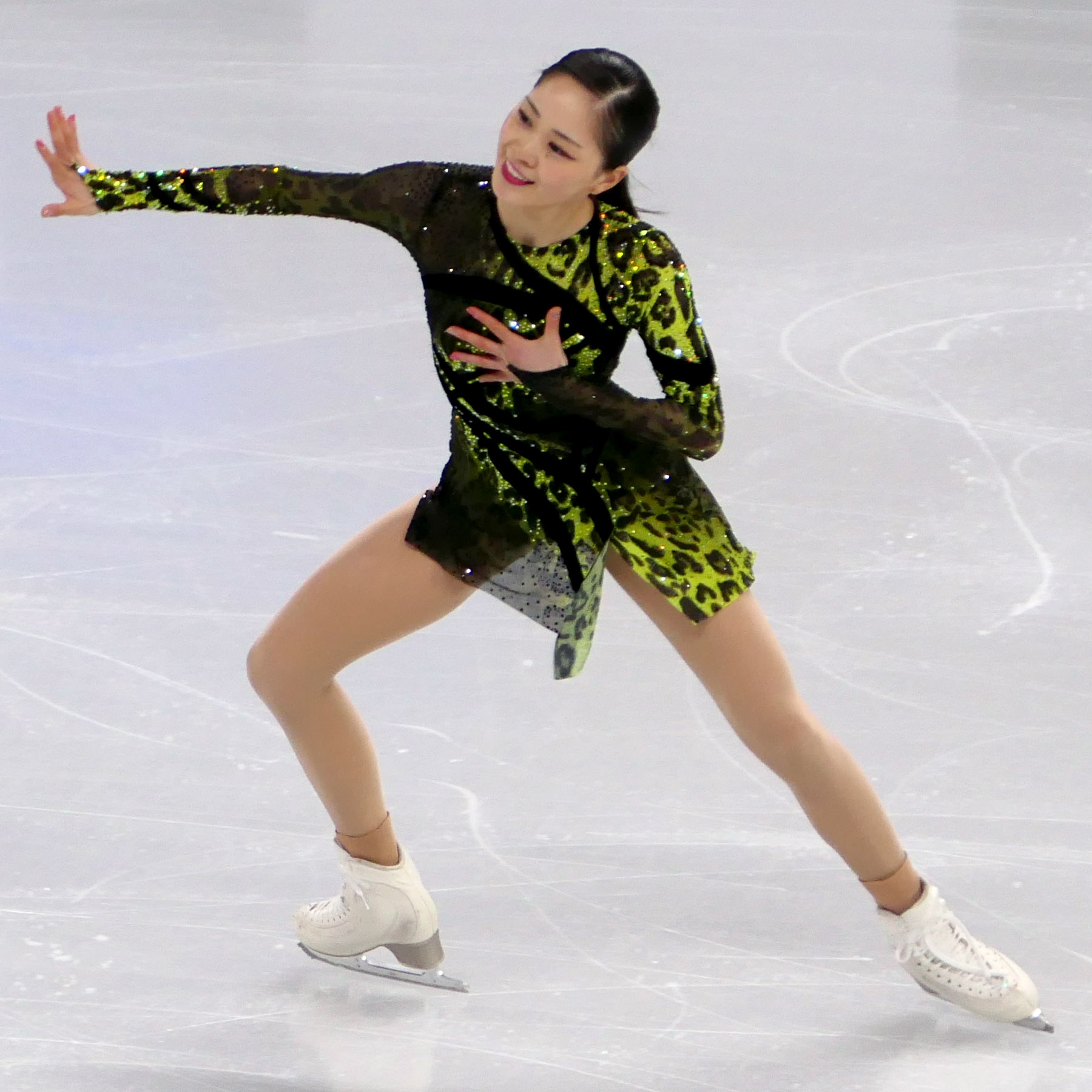
Yoshida performing her short program at the 2024 World Championships

Yoshida made her Challenger debut at the 2023 CS Lombardia Trophy, taking the silver medal. Invited to make her senior Grand Prix debut at the 2023 Skate America, she finished ninth in the short program after singling a planned triple Axel. She stepped out of her triple Axel in the free skate, but performed strongly otherwise and finished third in the segment, rising to fourth place overall. She finished less than four points behind bronze medalist Niina Petrõkina of Estonia. At the 2023 Cup of China, she placed third in the short program after falling on an underrotated triple Axel, but rallied to win the free skate and take the gold medal by 0.75 points over Rinka Watanabe. Yoshida said she was "surprised" to have won, and said she was focused on improving on various jump issues.

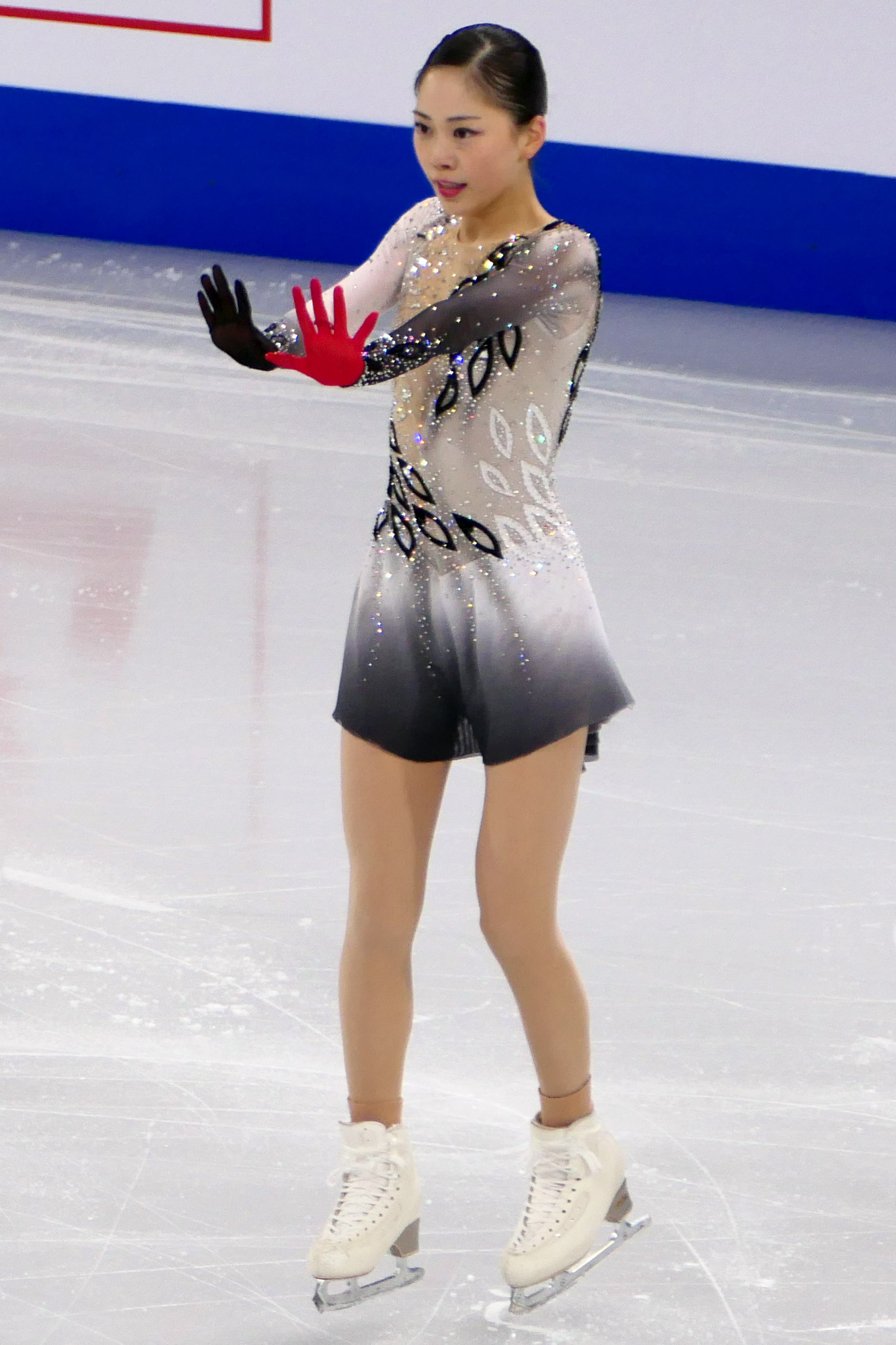
Yoshida performing her free skate at the 2024 World Championships

With Yoshida's results qualifying her for the 2023–24 Grand Prix Final in Beijing, she placed fourth in the short program after falling on both her triple Axel attempt and her jump combination. She rebounded in the free skate, landing a triple Axel and seven other triple jumps, though the triple Axel was deemed a quarter short of rotation. Yoshida was second in that segment with a new personal best score of 142.51 points, rising to the bronze medal. She finished only 0.20 points behind Belgian silver medalist Loena Hendrickx. Yoshida described it as "a dream for me to compete on this stage."

Multiple jump errors in the short program at the 2023–24 Japan Championships saw Yoshida come ninth in that segment. She rose to seventh after the free skate, calling the result "very disappointing."

In February, Yoshida received the Best Newcomer award at the 2024 ISU Skating Awards. She concluded the season in March at the 2024 World Championships, held in Montreal. Yoshida came eighth in the short program after both parts of her jump combination was called a quarter underrotated. She also had several quarter calls in the free skate, including on her triple Axel, finishing sixth in the segment but remaining eighth overall.

=== 2024–25 season ===
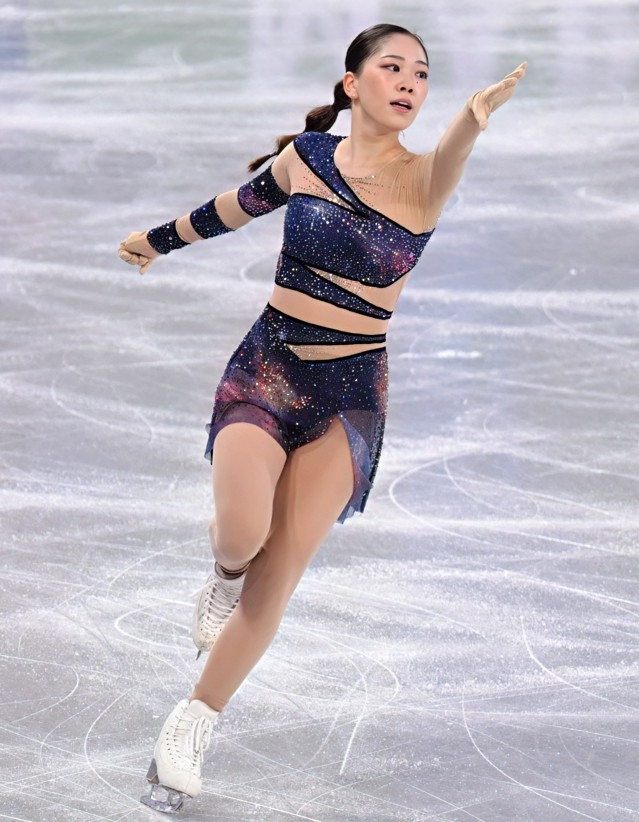
Yoshida during the free skate at the 2024–25 Grand Prix Final

Yoshida started the season by winning bronze at the 2024 CS Nebelhorn Trophy behind American skaters, Elyce Lin-Gracey and Isabeau Levito. Going on to compete on the 2024–25 Grand Prix circuit, Yoshida came fourth in the short program at the 2024 Skate Canada International after underrotating the second part of her jump combination. She was third in the free skate, despite a number of jump errors, and won the bronze medal behind Japanese peers Kaori Sakamoto and Rino Matsuike. Following the event, Christopher Tin, the musician that composed Yoshida's short program music, praised her performance on his social media accounts.

Three weeks later, Yoshida competed at the 2024 Finlandia Trophy. At the event, she won the short program and obtained a new personal best score. In the free skate, Yoshida fell on her opening triple axel but delivered her remaining jumps relatively cleanly. While she placed second in that segment of the competition behind Rino Matsuike, she managed to hold onto the gold medal position overall due to her short program result. “Performance-wise, I know I can do even better, and I hope to do that in the Final," she said. With her Grand Prix results, Yoshida accumulated enough points to qualify for the 2024–25 Grand Prix Final. She reflected on the season so far, and discussed her preparations and goals for the Grand Prix Final.

In December, Yoshida competed at the Grand Prix Final. She placed third in the short program. In the free skate, she began her program with a triple Axel, which was deemed a quarter under-rotated, and finished without making any major mistakes; however, she fell to fifth place overall. Yoshida said that while she did not reach the podium, she was "able to concentrate through the end" despite being nervous about performing directly after three-time World champion Kaori Sakamoto.

Two weeks later, she finished in eleventh place at the 2024–25 Japan Championships and was named as the third alternate for the 2025 World Championship team. The following month, Yoshida competed at the 2025 Winter World University Games in Turin, Italy, where she finished in fourth place.

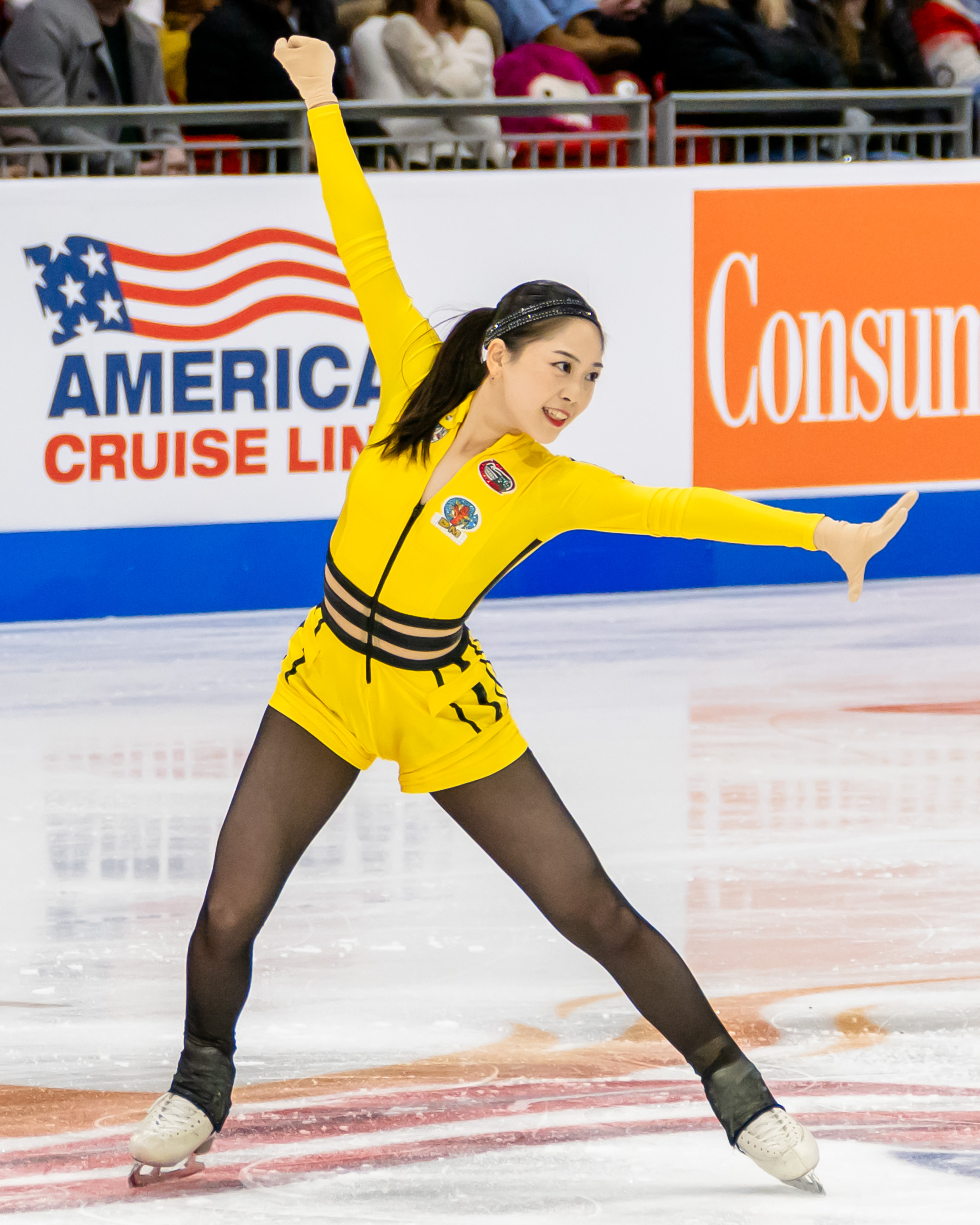
Yoshida performing her short program at 2025 Skate America

In late February, Yoshida won the bronze medal at the 2025 Asian Winter Games in Harbin, China behind Kim Chae-yeon and Kaori Sakamoto. She then finished the season by placing fifth at the 2025 Road to 26 Trophy.

=== 2025–26 season: Struggles & retirement ===
Yoshida opened her season by competing on the 2025–26 Challenge Series, finishing eighth at the 2025 CS Kinoshita Group Cup and at the 2025 CS Nebelhorn Trophy. She then went on to compete on the 2025–26 Grand Prix circuit, finishing tenth at the 2025 Cup of China and ninth at 2025 Skate America.

In December, she competed at the 2025–26 Japan Championships. She placed twenty-eighth in the short program and did not advance to the free skate segment.

On March 31, 2026, Yoshida announced her retirement from competitive figure skating.

== Honors and awards ==
- ISU Skating Awards 2024：Best Newcomer

== Programs ==
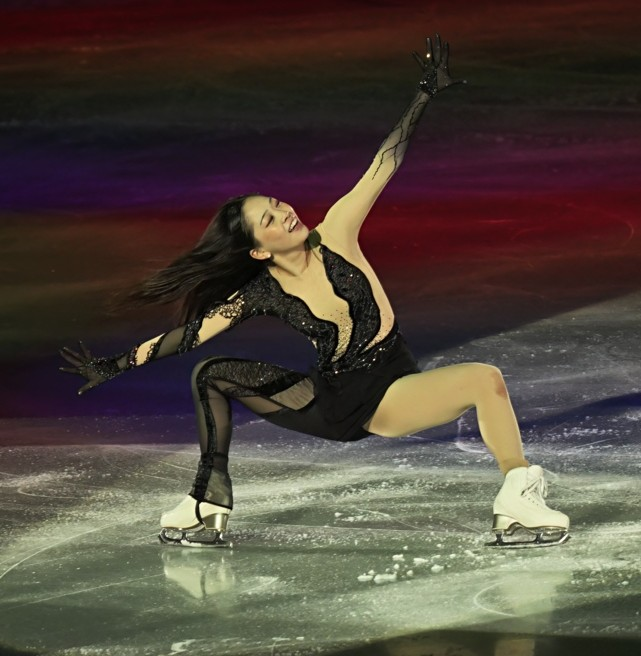
Yoshida performing a Besti squat during her exhibition program at the 2024–25 Grand Prix Final

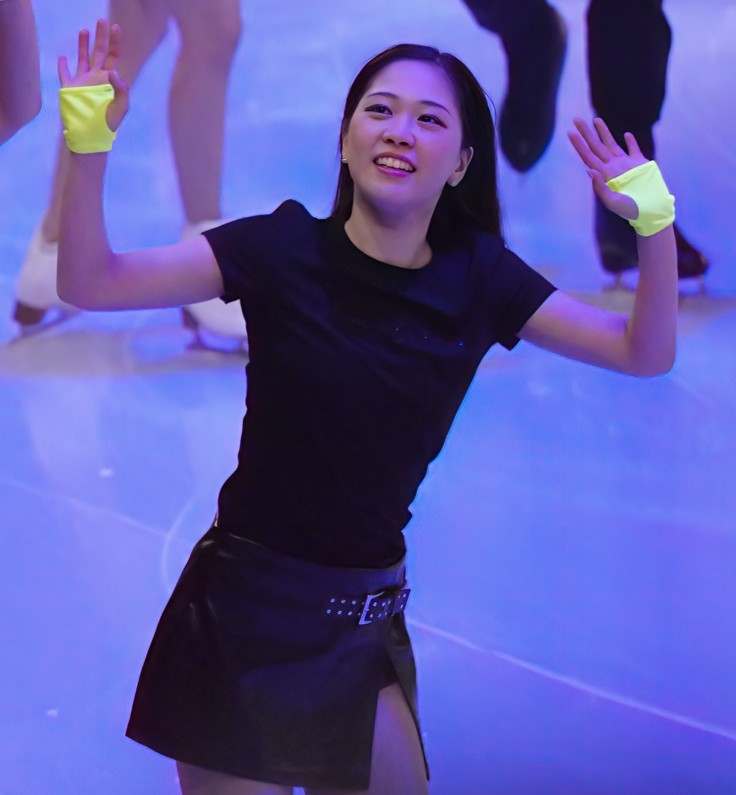
Yoshida during the Gala at the 2024–25 Grand Prix Final

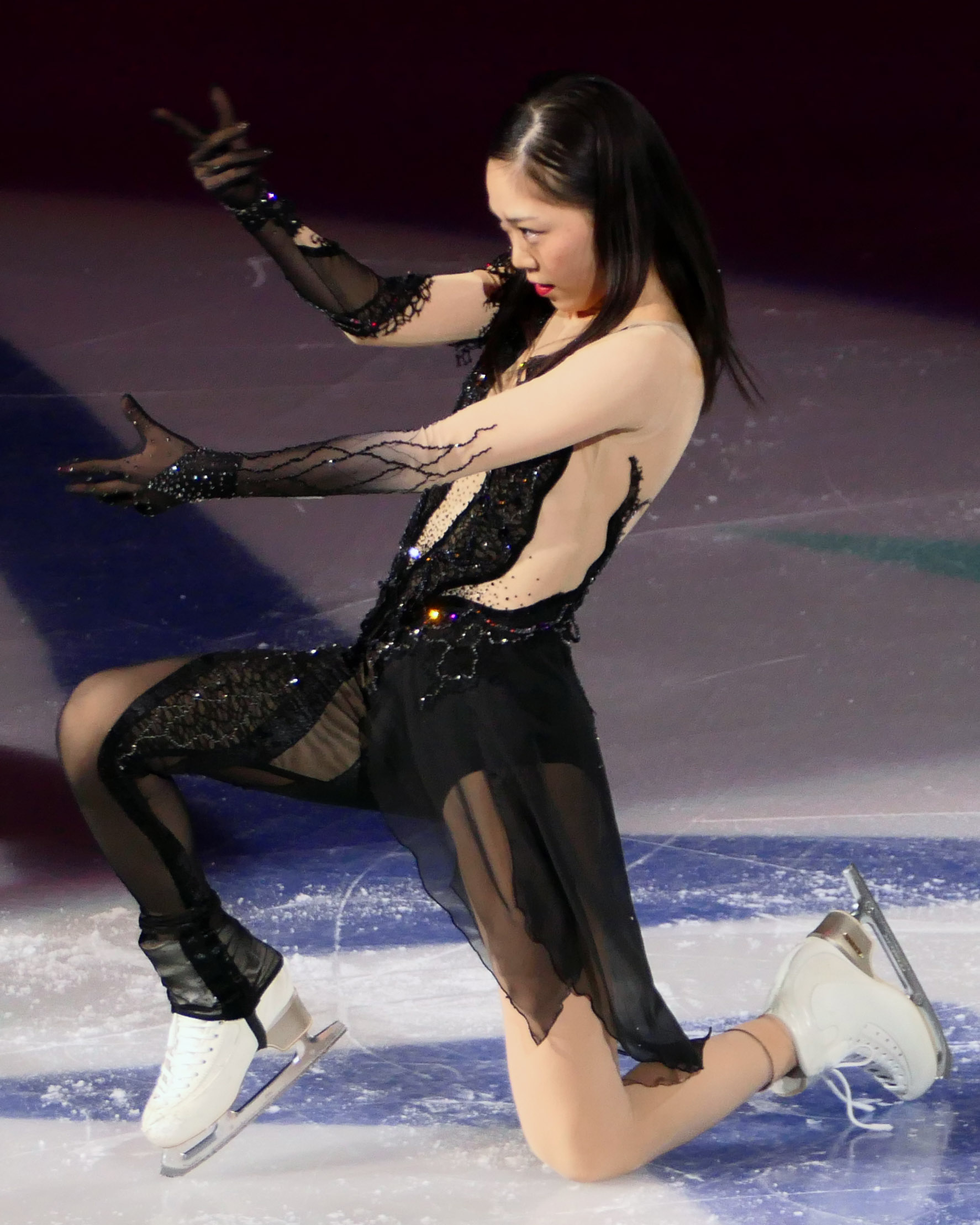
Yoshida during the Gala at the 2024 World Championships

Season	Short program	Free skating	Exhibition
2025–2026	Kill Bill; Twisted Main Title by Bernard Herrmann; Ironside Theme by Quincy Jones; Don't Let Me Be Misunderstood / Esmeralda Suite by Bennie Benjamin performed by Santa Esmeralda & RZA; Battle Without Honor or Humanity by Tomoyasu Hotei choreo. by Benoît Richaud	Shakuhachi (from Human) by Armand Amar & Suizan Lagrost; La terre vue du ciel by Armand Amar choreo. by Lori Nichol; Hana's Odyssey from Sea to Sky by Karl Hugo; The Siren and the Sailor by Jennifer Thomas ft. Alexa Ray choreo. by Lori Nichol	
2024–2025	Temen Oblak (Dark Clouds) by Christopher Tin & Le Mystère des Voix Bulgares choreo. by Benoît Richaud	S.O.S. d'un terrien en détresse (from Starmania) by Michel Berger & Luc Plamondon performed by Ariane Moffatt & Jean-Philippe Goncalves choreo. by Lori Nichol	Godzilla Minus One by Naoki Satō; Dark Horse by Katy Perry performed by Christina Grimmie choreo. by Benoît Richaud; Temen Oblak (Dark Clouds) by Christopher Tin & Le Mystère des Voix Bulgares choreo. by Benoît Richaud
2023–2024	Koo Koo Fun by Major Lazer & Major League Djz choreo. by Kaitlyn Weaver	Shakuhachi (from Human) by Armand Amar & Suizan Lagrost; La terre vue du ciel by Armand Amar choreo. by Lori Nichol	Dark Horse by Katy Perry performed by Christina Grimmie choreo. by Benoît Richaud; High School Musical; Start of Something New; We're All in This Together; High School Musical by the Cast of High School Musical; Return of the Jedi (Interactive Noise Remix) by Darth & Vader; Imperial March (Remix) by John Williams performed by The Selfie King & DENZ1
2022–2023	Dog Days Are Over by Florence and the Machine choreo. by Lori Nichol	6. Uranus, the Magician; 3. Mercury, the Winged Messenger (from The Planets) by Gustav Holst; Princess Leia's Theme (from Star Wars) by John Williams choreo. by Tom Dickson	Return of the Jedi (Interactive Noise Remix) by Darth & Vader; Imperial March (Remix) by John Williams performed by The Selfie King & DENZ1
2021–2022	Shine On You Crazy Diamond (Parts I–V) by Pink Floyd choreo. by Cathy Reed	Planet Ocean Suite by Angèle Dubeau, La Pietà choreo. by Lori Nichol	
2020–2021	The Mission by Ennio Morricone choreo. by Kana Muramoto	Zigeunerweisen by Pablo de Sarasate choreo. by Ernest Martinez	
2019–2020	Planetarium; Mia and Sebastian's Theme; Audition (The Fools Who Dream) (from La La Land) by Justin Hurwitz performed by Emma Stone choreo. by Miki Ando	Andrew Lloyd Webber Trilogy (Instrumental) by John Williams, Boston Pops; Bach Cello Suite No. 1 in G Major, Prelude by Johann Bach performed by Cooper Cannell	
2018–2019	Planetarium; Mia and Sebastian's Theme; Audition (The Fools Who Dream) (from La La Land) by Justin Hurwitz performed by Emma Stone choreo. by Miki Ando	Cats by Andrew Lloyd Webber choreo. by Kenji Miyamoto	
2017–2018	James Bond Theme by Moby	The Pink Panther Theme by Henry Mancini performed by Bobby McFerrin; It Had Better Be Tonight by Henry Mancini	The Pink Panther Theme by Henry Mancini performed by Bobby McFerrin; It Had Better Be Tonight by Henry Mancini; James Bond Theme by Moby

== Competitive highlights ==
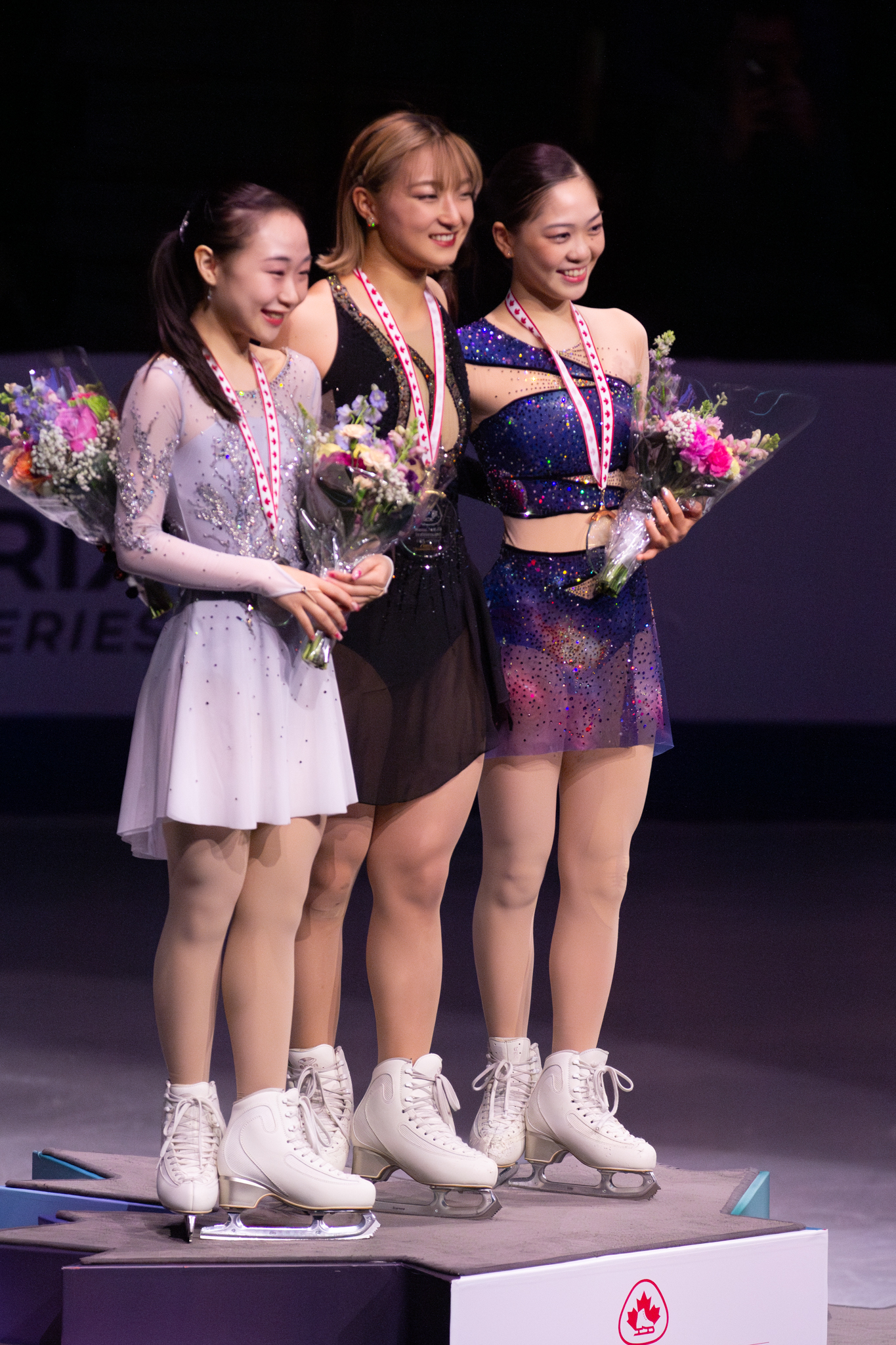
Yoshida (right) on the podium with other medalists at 2024 Skate Canada International

- GP – Event of the ISU Grand Prix Series
- JGP – Event of the ISU Junior Grand Prix Series
- CS – Event of the ISU Challenger Series
- TBD – Assigned
- WD – Withdrew from competition
- Medals at team events are awarded for the team results only. Individual placements at team events are listed in parentheses.

Competition placements at senior level
Season	2019–20	2020–21	2021–22	2022–23	2023–24	2024–25	2025–26
World Championships					8th		
Four Continents Championships				8th			
Grand Prix Final					3rd	5th	
Japan Championships	19th	16th	9th	6th	7th	11th	28th
GP Cup of China					1st		10th
GP Finland						1st	
GP Skate America					4th		9th
GP Skate Canada						3rd	
CS Kinoshita Group Cup							8th
CS Lombardia Trophy					2nd		
CS Nebelhorn Trophy						3rd	8th
Asian Games						3rd	
Egna Spring Trophy			1st				
Japan Open		1st (5th)					
Road to 26 Trophy						5th	
Tallink Hotels Cup					2nd		
Triglav Trophy				1st			
World University Games						4th	

Competition placements at junior level
Season	2017–18	2019–20	2020–21	2021–22	2022–23
Junior Grand Prix Final					6th
Japan Championships	8th	3rd	2nd	4th	
JGP France					1st
JGP Italy					1st
Bavarian Open				1st	

== Detailed results ==
ISU personal best scores in the +5/-5 GOE System
Segment	Type	Score	Event
Total	TSS	208.31	2022 JGP Italy
Short program	TSS	67.87	2024 Finlandia Trophy
Short program	TES	36.95	2022 JGP Italy
Short program	PCS	32.02	2024 Grand Prix de France
Free skating	TSS	142.51	2023–24 Grand Prix Final
Free skating	TES	78.14	2023–24 Grand Prix Final
Free skating	PCS	65.68	2023 Cup of China

=== Senior level ===
Results in the 2024–25 season
Date	Event	SP		FS		Total	
Date	Event	P	Score	P	Score	P	Score
Sep 19–21, 2024	(Germany) 2024 CS Nebelhorn Trophy	7	59.65	3	136.82	3	196.47
Oct 25–27, 2024	2024 Skate Canada International	4	65.32	3	126.05	3	191.37
Nov 15–17, 2024	(Finland) 2024 Finlandia Trophy	1	67.87	2	131.59	1	199.46
Dec 5–8, 2024	(France) 2024–25 Grand Prix Final	3	64.23	5	129.79	5	194.02
Dec 19–22, 2024	2024–25 Japan Championships	9	68.42	13	126.85	11	195.27
Jan 16–18, 2025	(Italy) 2025 Winter World University Games	5	60.48	3	126.95	4	187.43
Feb 11–13, 2025	(China) 2025 Asian Winter Games	3	68.76	3	136.44	3	205.20
Feb 18–20, 2025	(Italy) Road to 26 Trophy	6	53.66	2	130.36	5	184.02

Results in the 2025–26 season
Date	Event	SP		FS		Total	
Date	Event	P	Score	P	Score	P	Score
Sep 5–7, 2025	(Japan) 2025 CS Kinoshita Group Cup	11	55.41	6	125.11	8	180.52
Sep 25–27, 2025	(Germany) 2025 CS Nebelhorn Trophy	11	51.78	8	104.06	8	155.84
Oct 24–26, 2025	2025 Cup of China	11	61.47	9	115.07	10	176.54
Nov 14–16, 2025	(United States) 2025 Skate America	10	57.22	8	113.70	9	170.92
Dec 18–21, 2025	2025–26 Japan Championships	28	49.46	—N/a	—N/a	28	49.46

2023–24 season
Date	Event	SP	FS	Total
March 18–24, 2024	2024 World Championships	8; 64.56	6; 130.37	8; 194.93
February 15–18, 2024	2024 Tallink Hotels Cup	4; 59.02	1; 128.23	2; 187.25
December 20–24, 2023	2023–24 Japan Championships	9; 62.73	6; 131.49	7; 194.22
December 7–10, 2023	2023–24 Grand Prix Final	4; 60.65	2; 142.51	3; 203.16
November 10–12, 2023	2023 Cup of China	3; 64.65	1; 139.32	1; 203.97
October 20–22, 2023	2023 Skate America	9; 59.40	3; 131.58	4; 190.98
September 8–10, 2023	2023 CS Lombardia Trophy	3; 62.54	1; 122.91	2; 185.45
2022–23 season
Date	Event	SP	FS	Total
April 12–16, 2023	2023 Triglav Trophy	1; 69.79	1; 141.67	1; 211.46
February 7–12, 2023	2023 Four Continents Championships	10; 59.82	7; 129.78	8; 189.60
December 21–25, 2022	2022–23 Japan Championships	14; 59.49	3; 137.72	6; 197.21
2021–22 season
Date	Event	SP	FS	Total
April 7–10, 2022	2022 Egna Springs Trophy	1; 73.04	1; 137.73	1; 210.77
December 22–26, 2021	2021–22 Japan Championships	13; 61.35	8; 126.09	9; 187.44
2020–21 season
Date	Event	SP	FS	Total
December 24–27, 2020	2020–21 Japan Championships	19; 58.79	17; 104.99	16; 163.78
October 3, 2020	2020 Japan Open	–	5; 107.56	5P/1T
2019–20 season
Date	Event	SP	FS	Total
December 18–22, 2019	2019–20 Japan Championships	21; 50.96	18; 98.76	19; 149.72

=== Junior level ===
2022–23 season
Date	Event	SP	FS	Total
December 8–11, 2022	2022–23 Junior Grand Prix Final	6; 55.51	6; 102.79	6; 158.30
October 12–15, 2022	2022 JGP Italy	2; 66.89	1; 141.42	1; 208.31
August 24–27, 2022	2022 JGP France	2; 66.56	1; 136.96	1; 203.52
2021–22 season
Date	Event	SP	FS	Total
January 18–23, 2022	2022 Bavarian Open	1; 60.73	1; 133.50	1; 194.23
November 19–21, 2021	2021–22 Japan Junior Championships	3; 62.48	4; 110.07	4; 172.55
2020–21 season
Date	Event	SP	FS	Total
November 21–23, 2020	2020–21 Japan Junior Championships	2; 62.05	2; 127.44	2; 189.49
2019–20 season
Date	Event	SP	FS	Total
November 15–17, 2019	2019–20 Japan Junior Championships	10; 52.75	3; 115.11	3; 167.86
2017–18 season
Date	Event	SP	FS	Total
November 24–26, 2017	2017–18 Japan Junior Championships	12; 54.89	10; 103.15	8; 158.04
