= The Quest of Alain Ducasse =

2017 documentary film directed by Gilles de Maistre

- Film poster
- French: La quête d'Alain Ducasse
- Directed by: Gilles de Maistre
- Written by: Gilles de Maistre; Eric Roux
- Produced by: Vivien Aslanian; Gilles de Maistre; Romain Le Grand; Stéphane Simon
- Starring: Alain Ducasse; François Hollande; Emmanuel Macron; Prince Albert of Monaco; Massimo Bottura
- Cinematography: Gilles de Maistre
- Edited by: Michèle Hollander
- Music by: Armand Amar
- Production companies: Outside Films; Pathé Films; Jouror Productions; Someci; France Télévisions; Centre national du cinéma et de l'image animée
- Distributed by: Pathé
- Release date: November 10, 2017
- Running time: 84 minutes
- Country: France
- Languages: French; English; Japanese; Portuguese; Chinese
- Box office: $35,974

The Quest of Alain Ducasse (French: La quête d'Alain Ducasse) is a 2017 French documentary film written, produced and directed by Gilles de Maistre which follows the "quests" undertaken by renowned chef Alain Ducasse.

== Plot ==
The film follows the travels and events organized by Alain Ducasse, a well-known and successful restaurateur. In doing so, the movie tries to understand and unveil what motivates him in his "quests".

== Cast ==
- Alain Ducasse as himself
- François Hollande as himself
- Emmanuel Macron as himself
- Prince Albert of Monaco as himself
- Massimo Bottura as himself
- Laurent Fabius as himself
- Jacques Toubon as himself
- Donald Trump as himself

== Release ==
=== Reception ===
The review aggregator website Rotten Tomatoes reported a 69% approval rating based on 13 reviews. Glenn Kenny from The New York Times gave the film a bad review, stating: "I found 'The Quest of Alain Ducasse', a near-hagiographic documentary on the celebrated chef, a less than satisfactory experience." Serena Donadoni writing for the Village Voice, said: "De Maistre makes the case that haute cuisine serves the same function as haute couture, creating an indelible experience while encouraging new ideas to filter through the industry." Jordan Mintzer in his review for The Hollywood Reporter wrote: "If Ducasse is somewhat renowned for the simplicity of his dishes, for the way he can blend a few homegrown ingredients to achieve the perfect amalgam, then de Maistre definitely lathers the man with too much sauce." Alissa Simon from Variety called the movie "absorbing and cinematic", stating: "'The Quest of Alain Ducasse' offers the documentary equivalent of a memorable meal at one of the eponymous chef's three Michelin-starred restaurants."
