= List of 2022 box office number-one films in Germany =

This is a list of films which placed number one at the weekend box office for the year 2022.

== Number-one films ==
Week	Weekend End Date	Film	Total weekend gross (Euro)	Weekend openings in the Top 10	Ref.
1	January 2, 2022	Spider-Man: No Way Home	€4,000,000	Berliner Philharmoniker - Silvesterkonzert 2021/22 (#7), MET Opera: Cinderella (Massenet) (#8)	
2	January 9, 2022	Spider-Man: No Way Home	€3,850,000	The King's Man (#2), The 355 (#7)	
3	January 16, 2022	Spider-Man: No Way Home	€2,550,000	Scream (#2), Spencer (#6)	
4	January 23, 2022	Spider-Man: No Way Home	€1,869,000	Sing 2 (#2), Nightmare Alley (#9)	
5	January 30, 2022	Sing 2	€1,740,000	Rigoletto - Verdi (MET 2022) live (#6), Licorice Pizza (#7)	
6	February 6, 2022	Wunderschön	€2,000,000	Around the World in 80 Days (#6), The Sadness (#10)	
7	February 13, 2022	Wunderschön	€1,770,000	Death on the Nile (#2), Moonfall (#3), Marry Me (#6)	
8	February 20, 2022	Uncharted	€3,400,000	Der Pfad (#10)	
9	February 27, 2022	Uncharted	€2,400,000	Belfast (#7), King Richard (#10)	
10	March 6, 2022	The Batman	€4,350,000		
11	March 13, 2022	The Batman	€3,160,000	BTS Permission To Dance On Stage Seoul: Live Viewing (#3), Jackass Forever (#4), Bergen (#6), Parallel Mothers (#10)	
12	March 20, 2022	The Batman	€2,200,000	The Bad Guys (#2), Die Häschenschule - Der große Eierklau (#7), The Wolf and the Lion (#8)	
13	March 27, 2022	The Batman	€1,250,000	Ambulance (#4), Carlos - Verdi (MET 2022) live (#8)	
14	April 3, 2022	Sonic the Hedgehog 2	€1,800,000	Morbius (#2), Jujutsu Kaisen 0 (#5)	
15	April 10, 2022	Fantastic Beasts: The Secrets of Dumbledore	€7,440,000		
16	April 17, 2022	Fantastic Beasts: The Secrets of Dumbledore	€4,700,000		
17	April 24, 2022	Fantastic Beasts: The Secrets of Dumbledore	€3,300,000		
18	May 1, 2022	Fantastic Beasts: The Secrets of Dumbledore	€2,000,000		
19	May 8, 2022	Doctor Strange in the Multiverse of Madness	€7,000,000		
20	May 15, 2022	Doctor Strange in the Multiverse of Madness	€3,600,000		
21	May 22, 2022	Doctor Strange in the Multiverse of Madness	€2,600,000		
22	May 29, 2022	Top Gun: Maverick	€5,600,000		
23	June 5, 2022	Top Gun: Maverick	€4,320,000		
24	June 12, 2022	Jurassic World Dominion	€5,800,000		
25	June 19, 2022	Jurassic World Dominion	€3,330,000		
26	June 26, 2022	Jurassic World Dominion	€2,200,000		
27	July 3, 2022	Minions: The Rise of Gru	€4,200,000		

== See also ==
- Cinema of Germany

Preceded by 2021	2022	Succeeded by 2023
