= Earth from Above =

Ecological project led by Yann Arthus-Bertrand

Earth from Above is a United Nations-supported ecological project conceived and led by Yann Arthus-Bertrand. The project includes a photo essay-style collection of aerial photography produced by Arthus-Bertrand, in which the photographer captured vistas of Earth from various aircraft during a ten-year period. It gave birth to a book also entitled Earth from Above, of which millions of copies were sold.

== Background ==
Arthus-Bertrand founded the Altitude Agency in 1991, the world's first press agency and image bank specializing in aerial photography. The agency holds 350,000 "selected images" taken in more than a hundred countries. With a history of environmental activism, the photographer sought to exhibit his work at the Rio Conference in 1992, and eventually made a decision to document the condition of planet Earth.

== UN sponsorship ==
In 1994, intent on conveying his perspective on environmental sustainability to other humans, Arthus-Bertrand successfully attained sponsorship from the United Nations Educational, Scientific and Cultural Organization (UNESCO) for the purposes of a long-term photographic project entitled, "The Earth From Above, Wild Animals, Horses, and 365 Days".

== Book ==
Following the Rio summit, Arthus-Bertrand subsequently created a picture inventory of landscapes from across the world with each picture, and accompanying text, encouraging the reader to be responsible in their treatment of the earth. The book from the project, Earth from Above (French: La terre vue du ciel), sold several million copies and was translated into over 21 languages.

== Exhibitions ==
As part of a series of outdoor displays, the "Earth from Above" free exhibition was set up at the gates of Jardin du Luxembourg in Paris, whereby the images appeared as big posters. At the conclusion of the first decade of the 21st century, the series of public exhibitions have been seen by over 200 million people.

== Film ==
In 2007, Earth from Above was launched in a film format, broadcast on French national television as a 4-episode, 8-hour television series. The series, presented by Arthus-Bertrand, has been approved for four seasons (15 episodes) and was created over a four-year timespan.

== See also ==
- Environmental art
- Home (2009 film)
- Algeria from above
