= Home (2009 film) =

- French theatrical release poster
- Directed by: Yann Arthus-Bertrand
- Written by: Isabelle Delannoy; Yann Arthus-Bertrand; Denis Carot; Yen le Van
- Produced by: Denis Carot; Luc Besson
- Narrated by: Glenn Close (English); Jacques Gamblin (French); Salma Hayek (Spanish); Mahmood Said (Arabic); Zhou Xun (Mandarin); Aleksandr Gruzdev (Russian); Stephen Chan Chi Wan (Hong Kong); Furkat Usmanov (Uzbek); Zdeněk Svěrák (Czech)
- Cinematography: Michel Benjamin; Dominique Gentil
- Edited by: Yen le Van
- Music by: Armand Amar
- Production company: EuropaCorp
- Distributed by: Europa Corp., with sponsorship from Kering
- Release date: 5 June 2009
- Running time: 90 minutes
- Country: France
- Budget: $12 million

Home is a 2009 French documentary film by Yann Arthus-Bertrand. The film is almost entirely composed of aerial shots of various places on Earth. It shows the diversity of life on Earth and how humanity is threatening the ecological balance of the planet. The English version was read by Glenn Close. The Spanish version was read by Salma Hayek. The Arabic version was read by Mahmood Said.

It was released simultaneously on 5 June 2009, in cinemas across the globe, on DVD, Blu-ray, television, and on YouTube, opening in 181 countries. The film was financed by the luxury group Kering. The concept of the documentary was inspired by the director's book Earth from Above. The film had its world festival premiere at the Dawn Breakers International Film Festival in 2012.

== Production ==
Home was filmed in various stages due to the expanse of the areas portrayed. Taking over eighteen months (1.5 years) to complete the film, director Yann Arthus-Bertrand and a camera man, a camera engineer and a pilot flew in a small helicopter through various regions in over fifty countries.

The filming was done using high-definition "Cineflex" cameras which were suspended from a gyro-stabilized sphere from rails on the base of the helicopter. These cameras, originally manufactured for army firing equipment, reduce vibrations helping to capture smooth images, which appear as if they had been filmed from crane arms or dollies. After almost every flight, recordings were immediately checked to ensure they were usable. Raw footage totaled 488 hours.

=== Filming locations ===
The documentary was filmed in all of the continents of the world, including Antarctica, covering landscapes in 54 countries, which include:

Africa

- Botswana
- Burkina Faso
- Chad
- Gabon
- Gibraltar
- Kenya
- Madagascar
- Mali
- Mauritania
- Mauritius
- Morocco
- Nigeria
- Senegal
- Swaziland
- South Africa
- Tanzania

Asia

- Bangladesh
- China
- India
- Indonesia
- Israel
- Japan
- Jordan
- Kazakhstan
- The Maldives
- Nepal
- Qatar
- Saudi Arabia
- South Korea
- Thailand

Europe

- Denmark
- France
- Germany
- Greece
- Iceland
- Netherlands
- Norway
- Portugal
- Spain
- Ukraine
- Russia

Oceania

- Australia
- Easter Islands
- New Zealand

South America

- Argentina
- Brazil

North America

- Canada: Nunavut
- Costa Rica
- United States

== Distribution and promotion ==
To promote the documentary online, a YouTube channel known as "HomeProject" was created. Uploaded to this were various short clips of filming which took place in different parts of the world including the Arctic Circle, Africa and the large metropolises featured.

On 9 March 2009, a press-conference was held in Paris, France, where Yann Arthus-Bertrand and various producers talked to the media about the issues raised in the film, as well as confirming that Home would be the first film ever to be simultaneously released in theaters, on television, on DVD and on the Internet in five continents.

On 5 May 2009, a second press-conference was held again in Paris, where the same crew members announced that the film's release date would be 5 June 2009, World Environment Day. Here, they also announced that Home would be 100% free for everyone to view, as "The benefits of this film cannot be counted in dollars, but in audience figures." They also revealed that PPR was going to sponsor the film in order to facilitate unavoidable costs.

The film, which was available for free release until 14 June, has been broadcast in 14 languages. The Blu-ray edition was released by 20th Century Fox and features both the English and French versions. It was expected to sell in excess of 100,000 copies. When production costs are met, all proceeds sale takings will go to the GoodPlanet Foundation.

== Copyright and redistribution rights ==
Yann Arthus-Bertrand said in a TED talk that the movie has no copyright: "This film have [sic] no copyright. On the fifth of June, the environmental day, everyone can download the movie on Internet. The film is given for free by the distributor to TV and theater to show it on June 5th." Nevertheless, a copyright notice appears in the final credits.

Several editions of the movie are available for download. Archive.org offer low, medium, and high quality version of the 93-minute movie. They offer both direct downloads and a torrent file.

== Public response ==
The film received a large response upon release, receiving over 400,000 combined views within the first 24 hours on YouTube. As of June 2012, the French, English, German, Spanish, Russian and Arabic versions on YouTube logged a total of more than 32 million views. It was shown to high ratings on channels around the world including the international network National Geographic Channel. France 2 débuted the film to over 8.3 million viewers in France alone. In India, Home was shown exclusively via the STAR World cable network.

== Critical response ==
Generally, the movie was praised for its visuals but received criticism regarding the attitude of the narration and the contradiction between its message and the sponsors' legacy.

Jeannette Catsoulis of The New York Times criticizes the film's narration and Glenn Close, narrator in the English version, both regarding content and style: "We've heard it all before, if not in the schoolmarmish tones of Glenn Close, whose patronizing narration […] makes the film feel almost as long as the life of its subject." Furthermore, she denounces the film's accusations towards the modern "lifestyle that 'destroys the essential to produce the superfluous'—an accusation that the film's bankrollers, led by the corporation behind luxury brands like Balenciaga and Gucci, are probably familiar with…"

Jean-Michel Frodon, a French movie critic, expressed the opinion that "'Home' had many viewers but didn't have much echo" because Arthus-Bertrand's personality, activities and his innovative no-cost concept have captured more attention than the movie itself.

Jason Buchanan, a film critic for AllMovie Guide, expressed the view that "we are afforded the unique opportunity to witness our changing environment from an entirely new vantage point," and that the film was "produced to inspire action and encourage thoughtful debate."

== See also ==
- Planet Earth – a BBC nature documentary series
- Qatsi trilogy – a series of three films by Godfrey Reggio
- Chronos – a film by Ron Fricke that explores the passage of time
- Baraka
- An Inconvenient Truth
- Colombia Magia Salvaje, a 2015 Colombian movie, inspired by this movie
- List of environmental films
