= Dis-moi qui tuer =

- Directed by: Étienne Périer
- Written by: Maurice Fabre; Didier Goulard
- Produced by: Jacques Bar; Pierre Kalfon
- Starring: Michèle Morgan; Paul Hubschmid
- Cinematography: Henri Raichi
- Production companies: Compagnie Internationale de Productions Cinématographiques (CIPRA); Films Number One; Trianon Films
- Release date: 26 November 1965
- Running time: 90 minutes
- Country: France
- Language: French

Dis-moi qui tuer (English title: Tell Me Whom to Kill) is a 1965 French drama mystery film directed by Étienne Périer. The screenplay was written by Maurice Fabre and Didier Goulard, based on a novel by Henri Lapierre. The film stars Michèle Morgan and Paul Hubschmid.

== Plot ==
A couple of children come across evidence of a Nazi treasure in an old hotel.

== Cast ==
- Michèle Morgan as Geneviève Monthannet
- Paul Hubschmid as Reiner Dietrich
- Darío Moreno as Pitou
- Rellys as Le Basta
- Jean Yanne as Federucci
- Jean-Roger Caussimon as Kopf
- Alain Decock as Constantin
- François Leccia as Marc Pestel
- Germaine Montero as Madame Fayard
- Daniel Allier as Machelin
- Yann Arthus-Bertrand as Galland
- Fiona Lewis as Pompon
