= The First Cry =

- Theatrical release poster
- Directed by: Gilles de Maistre
- Written by: Gilles de Maistre; Marie-Claire Javoy
- Starring: Isabella Ferrari
- Cinematography: Romain Hamdane; Martin Blanchard
- Edited by: Marie Quinton
- Music by: Armand Amar
- Production companies: Mai-Juin Productions; M6 Films; Wild Bunch; Canal+; TPS Star
- Distributed by: Buena Vista International
- Release date: 31 October 2007
- Running time: 99 minutes
- Country: France
- Language: French

The First Cry (French: Le Premier Cri) is a 2007 French documentary film directed by Gilles de Maistre.

== Synopsis ==
The film follows 12 women from different parts the world as they prepare for childbirth. They are portrayed during the 24 hours leading up to the birth of their children.

== Reception ==
The film was released in France on 31 October 2007. Isabelle Regnier wrote in Le Monde that it engages in "sacralization of pregnant women, aestheticization of suffering bodies, ritualization of the gift of life". She said it deprives the women of individuality, for example by using a French voiceover. By primarily depicting home births, it seems to Regnier to present a negative view of hospitals.

It was nominated for the César Award for Best Documentary Film.
