= The Wolf and the Lion (film) =

- Original theatrical poster
- French: Le loup et le lion
- Directed by: Gilles de Maistre
- Written by: Gilles de Maistre; Prune de Maistre
- Produced by: Catherine Camborde; Nicolas Elghozi; Jacques Perrin; Valentine Perrin
- Starring: Molly Kunz; Graham Greene; Charlie Carrick
- Cinematography: Serge Desrosiers
- Production companies: M6 Films; Mai Juin Productions; Galatée Films; Transfilm International; Wematin Productions
- Distributed by: StudioCanal
- Release dates: 25 September 2021 (Zurich Film Festival); 13 October 2021 (France)
- Running time: 99 minutes
- Countries: France; Canada
- Languages: English; French
- Box office: $18.5 million

The Wolf and the Lion (French: Le loup et le lion) is a 2021 family adventure film directed by Gilles de Maistre who also wrote the script with his wife Prune de Maistre. The film stars Molly Kunz as Alma, who returns to her late grandfather's cabin and finds herself taking care of a wolf pup and a lion cub who grow up together as brothers. The film premiered on 25 September 2021 at the Zurich Film Festival where it won best children's film. It went on to wide release on 13 October 2021. The film received generally negative reviews from critics.

== Plot ==
After losing her grandfather, Alma Deranquel returns to her childhood home in the Canadian wilderness. In the forest, she comes across the wreckage of a plane that had been destined for a circus with a lion cub poached from its mother in Africa. The cub falls into her hands when a bald eagle knocks it out of the nest it fell into during the crash. She decides not to hand it over to the forest rangers because her grandfather campaigned against the mistreatment of animals in circuses. At the same time, a female wolf who had somewhat befriended Alma's grandfather—perhaps because his cabin was built over the site of the old wolf den where she, herself, was born and raised—comes to find refuge in Alma's house, with her pup, when she is pursued by two scientists. The lion cub and the wolf pup live like brothers; they play together and both are kept well-fed thanks to the she-wolf.

While Alma is off on a 2-day trip involving a classical music audition for the Los Angeles Philharmonic Orchestra, the wolf mother disappears. It turns out that she was hit by a tranquilizer dart fired by one of the two scientists, both of them wishing to transfer her to a breeding facility for the (fictional) endangered wolf species Canis lupus nyx. This leaves Alma the only one available to raise and protect the cubs while the three of them live in peace for a year or two. During that time, she names the wolf pup Mozart and the lion cub Dreamer (in apparent reference to the Ozzy Osbourne song). After Alma has an accident, her Native Canadian godfather Joe must notify the authorities to save her, despite the fact that this separates the trio.

Mozart is reunited with his mother at the rescue facility, where the two zoologists hope he'll breed with the available younger females as soon as possible. Meanwhile, the lion trainer of the circus who bought Dreamer begins showing his classical music-loving son Raphael how to show a lion who is "boss". The brutal methods demonstrated (off-camera) visibly horrify the boy. In the meantime, Alma has left the hospital where she had been recovering from a concussion. With Joe's help, she begins tracking down which particular circus bought Dreamer, as the local forest ranger in charge is also Joe's bitter ex-girlfriend, making her doubly uncooperative.

The circus in question eventually passes by the wolf breeding facility, allowing Mozart to catch his foster brother's scent. Mozart therefore escapes that night by digging a tunnel under the mesh-wire fence. Upon discovering this, Eli (the senior zoologist) has to apologize to Alma for their earlier misunderstanding to get her help in tracking down Mozart. By which point, Mozart has miraculously liberated Dreamer, allowing the two of them to head back towards Alma's island. Unfortunately, their journey does not go unnoticed and the police soon receive multiple phone calls about the two "dangerous" animals.

With Raphael's help, Alma and Eli track down Mozart and Dreamer not far from the child-sized log cabin where Alma used to play as a little girl. Raphael's father tries to take Dreamer back at gunpoint, but Raphael manages to dissuade him just before a police SWAT team arrives on the scene. Alma takes Mozart and Dreamer through a secret tunnel from the play house to a certain hollow tree. From there, she and Mozart swim to the island without Dreamer, who wanders off to divert the SWAT team's attention. Tense moments later, however, it is revealed that Dreamer managed to outwit his hunters.

The movie ends with Alma performing an outdoor concert for the benefit of abused captive wild animals while Mozart and Dreamer play together in the nearby woods.

== Cast ==
- Molly Kunz as Alma
- Graham Greene as Joe
- Charlie Carrick as Eli
- Rhys Slack as Rapha
- Daniel Brochu as Mr. Mitchell
- Frank Schorpion as Pilot
- Rebecca Croll as Ysea
- Paddington as Dreamer
- Walter as Mozart

== Production and release ==
Gilles de Maistre said that during the filming of Mia and the White Lion he had a discussion with wolf trainer Andrew Simpson and lion trainer Kevin Richardson that gave him the idea for the film. He then wrote a script with his wife Prune de Maistre. Paddington (the wolf) and Walter (the lion) were raised together from the age of 5 weeks. Only a few people, including Molly Kunz could approach them; the film crew and the other actors were behind cages. The production adapted to its star animals, which resulted in 16 script revisions. After filming, Paddington and Walter continue to live together in Canada on Andrew Simpson's reservation.

The Wolf and the Lion premiered at the Zurich Film Festival on 25 September 2021, and the wide release began on 13 October 2021. Blue Fox Entertainment obtained the US distribution rights, where it was released on 4 February 2022.

== Reception ==
The film holds a 29% approval rating on Rotten Tomatoes from 21 reviews, with an average rating of 5/10. The film has received praise for the picturesque scenery and the scenes involving the animals, director of photography Serge Desrosiers, but beyond that, it has faced criticism of its feature-length runtime and the aspects of the film that involve the plot and human actors. In his review for the Austin Chronicle, Richard Whittaker enjoyed the sweet return of the recently absent animal-adventure film genre, but he felt the production sent mixed messages about wild animal relationships amongst each other and with humans. For the Los Angeles Times, Kimber Myers called the film "laughably bad", and summed up the general sentiment writing, "The Wolf and the Lion does have impressive scenes of these two animals, first as aww-inducing babies and then as awe-inspiring adults, all shot in the impossibly beautiful Canadian forest. However, it’s strung together with an implausible script, odd framing and nonsensical editing."

=== Accolades ===
After its debut, the film won best children's film at the Zurich Film Festival.
