= 7 Billion Others =

Series of videos by Yann Arthus-Bertrand

- Directed by: Yann Arthus-Bertrand
- Written by: Baptiste Rouget-Luchaire
- Produced by: Florent Gilard; Ulla Lohmann
- Starring: Cristina Frias
- Release date: 2003
- Running time: 78 minutes
- Countries: France, Bangladesh, among many other locations
- Language: English

7 Billion Others (French: 7 milliards d'autres) is a series of videos by Yann Arthus-Bertrand. Each of the videos feature a single person telling the viewer about their life, often in their native language. The project's homepage states that since the project's beginning in 2003, over 5000 individuals have had their testimonials recorded for the project. According to Arthus-Bertrand, the project's aim is to help different people to understand each other through listening. The project was previously called 6 Billion Others, but was later renamed to 7 Billion Others.

The scholar Tiago Luca thought that the work's name reflects apprehensions about the uncontrolled increase in humans. In the journal Open Cultural Studies, Zoë Druick , wrote that "the ambitions of the 7 Billion Others project are, as its title suggests, encyclopaedic and totalizing".

== Reception ==
The author Bruno Rouffaer said 7 Billion Others enables viewers to have "a more transglobal, holistic view of mankind", noting that he frequently "listen[s] in silence and amazement" at the participants' stories".
