= Alain Weber (artistic director) =

French artistic director

- Occupations: Artistic director; musical advisor; producer

Alain Weber is a French artistic director, musical advisor, producer, and stage director. He is the artistic director of several festivals including, Sacred Spirit Festival of Jodhpur and Nagaur, the Fez World Sacred Music Festival, Les Orientales d'Anjou Festival in Saint-Florent le Vieil and Angers and the Al Kamandjati Festival. He is also the artistic director of Zaman Productions, which he set up in 2001 to promote artists and projects. Alain Weber is currently the world music advisor to the Philharmonie de Paris.

== Career ==
Weber began his career in the late 70s with the discovery of the music of Upper Egypt, where he decided to create, with the help of the Ministry of Culture (Egypt), the group, Musicians of the Nile, one of the first traditional Arab music ensembles to tour the world led by Metqal Qenawi Metqal.

He has produced shows and creations in historic venues such as the Opéra Garnier in Paris, the Jardin des Tuileries, Mont Saint Michel, Bâb Makina in Fez, the Mehrangargh Fort in Jodhpur, the Palais de Bettedine in Lebanon, the Carthage Festival, the Palais Hicham in Jericho, the Church of Saint Anne in Jerusalem and the Almaty Opera House in Kazakhstan.

After working as a program producer for Radio France (France-Culture and France Inter) and as a music critic, he turned his attention to discovering other Eastern musical ensembles. After discovering the Roma origins of the musicians of Upper Egypt, he set off on a quest for the origins of "Gypsy" or "Roma" music, which led him to Rajasthan, where he created the Divana ensemble with Gazi Khan Barna and Anwar Khan Manganiyar.

He later initiated the "Les Tsiganes du Monde" project at the Florence Festival (1991) and at the Opéra Garnier as part of the Paris Quartier d'été festival (1992), bringing together Gypsy and Roma ensembles from the Orient to Spain. This project led him to work as a musical advisor on Tony Gatlif's film Latcho Drom and other projects. From 2006 to 2013, he was in charge of the programming of live shows at the musée du quai Branly.

=== Artistic direction of festivals ===
==== Sacred Spirit Festival Jodhpur and Nagaur – Rajasthan ====
Alain Weber is also the artistic director of the Sacred Spirit Festival created by Maharajah Gaj Singh of Jodhpur in 2013, and directed by his daughter, Princess Baijilal Shivranjani Rajye of Marwar and Alexandra de Cadaval.

==== Fez Festival of World Sacred Music ====
Since 2010, Alain Weber has been the artistic director of the Fez Festival of World Sacred Music, where he has introduced works such as "Nuits de la médina". Based on the theme of each year's festival, these Bab Al Makina creations, in a series of scenes illustrated by mapping, put into context the diversity and richness of the world's great traditions. In 2001, The festival has already been recognized by the United Nations as a major cultural event.

==== Les Orientales ====
In 1999, at the instigation of Hervé de Charette, mayor of Saint Florent-le Viel and former Minister of Foreign Affairs, Alain Weber created the Festival des Orientales, dedicated to the great popular traditions of the Orient and Asia.

=== Recording labels ===
In 1994, together with Armand Amar he founded Long Distance recording label.

In 2014, he produced the album "From Another World" for Buda Musique, in which traditional artists from all over the world cover Bob Dylan songs.

=== Cinema and documentaries ===
In 1993, he was the musical advisor on Tony Gatlif's Latcho Drom. In 1997, Tony Gatlif drew inspiration from his life, travels and professional life for his film Gadjo Dilo.

In 2006, he directed a documentary entitled Au coeur du Nil soufi on Sufi music in Egypt.

In 2016, Weber participated as a musical director on the music documentary series Ethnopholia for the Lebanese channel "Al Mayadeen" with Abeer Nehme.

== Works ==
=== Creations and staging ===
- 1997: Les Chants du Nil - Autum Festival - Paris, Bouffes du Nord Theater, Cultural Egyptian Year in France
- 1999: Femmes des plaines et des montagnes, Autum Festival - Paris, Bouffes du Nord Theater, Cultural Moroccan Year in France
- 2008: Poètes et Saltimbanques de l'Inde, Rajasthan Folk traditions Traditions - Cité de la Musique
- 2009: Izlan, Chant des femmes du Maroc, des montagnes aux plaines, du désert à la mer.Théâtre Claude Lévi-Strauss - Quai Branly Museum – Paris
- 2012: Au cœur du Nil soufi - Théâtre Claude Lévi-Strauss - Quai Branly Museum – Paris
- 2012: Prem Sanyas - Light of Asia, ciné - concert with Divana Ensemble
- 2012: From the movie dof Franz Osten and Himansu Rai de 1925
- 2013: On the tracks of Marco Polo, Beittedine Festival of Beyrouth
- 2014: Carthage Festival – Tunisia
- 2016: Almaty - Kazakhstan
- 2018: Bethleem Art Center
- 2015: Léon l'Africain, à la quête de l'Afrique, Fez Festival of World Sacred Music Opening night
- 2016: A Sky full of stars, Fez Festival of World Sacred Music Opening night
- 2017: Spirit on the Water, Fez Festival of World Sacred Music Opening night
- 2018: Masters of Time - Fez Festival of World Sacred Music Opening night
- 2018: Hommage aux grandes Divas - orchestra directioj Ramzi Aburedwan with Abeer Nehme, Mai Farouk, Dalal Abu Amen, Philharmonie de Paris
- 2019: Jerusalem A prophetic city" - Opening of the season "Jerusalem capital of Islamic Culture", Palais Hisham, Jericho, Palestine
- 2020: Ma valise est mon pays - A Tribute to Mahmoud Darwich with Ramzi Aburedwan and Rachida Brakni, Rodolphe Burger, Ghalia Benali, Kamilya Jubran - Philharmonie de Paris
- 2022: Voix et géométries sacrées - Fez Festival of World Sacred Music Opening night - Through stones and sacred symbols, we sail through the great beliefs of Mankind
- 2024: Zyriab ou La Cinquième corde - Fez Festival of World Sacred Music Opening night

=== Thematic ===
- 1987: Les Fleuves du Monde – Festival d'Avignon, Les Tsiganes du Monde
- 1991: Firenze Festival
- 1992: Opéra Garnier - Festival Paris Quartier d'été
- 1993: Opéra Africa – Opéra Garnier - Paris Quartier d'été Festival, creation with Youssou N'Dour and 6 different African countries
- 1994: Les Nuits du Maghreb – Opéra Garnier - Paris Quartier d'été Festival
- 1997: Etoiles du Nil - Tuileries Gardens - Paris Quartier d'été Festival
- 1998: Festival Gypsy nights for Pina Bausch - Tanz Theater - Wurpenthal
- 1998: Program of World Gypsy Music - Lisboa Universal Exhibition
- 2000: Children of Today - Musicians of Tomorrow, 2000 year Célébration - Cité des Enfants à Blois with over 200 children showcasing their rich heritage.
- 2000: In charge of the general Music Program for the Hanover Universal Exhibition
- 2002: Children musicians Festival for Pina Bausch - Tanz Theater Wurpenthal
- 2011-2012: Grand Ramdan Night - Parc de La Villette –lCité de la Musique et du Parc La Villette under the direction of Cultural Minister Frédéric Mitterrand

=== Private events ===
- 2011: Le Rajasthan au Prix de Diane pour Hermès
- 2011: Célébration de la Journée nationale des mémoires de la traite de l'esclavage - Jardin du Luxembourg
- 2012: On the Nile - Hermès International Show in Egypt
- 2014: - Hermès International Show - Mont Saint Michel – France
- 2017: Musical director for the Lalla Salma Princess Foundation Charity Gala
- 2018: Festival Evora Africa
- 2019: Musical Director for Hermès International - Tromso – Norway
- 2022: Musical Program for the exhibition Love Yves Saint Laurent – Palais Cadaval -Evora

== Published works ==
- Weber, Alain (2008). Il viaggio musicale dei gitani. Dall'India all'Andalusia (in Italian). Casa Ricordi. ISBN 978-88-7592-856-8.
