= Michael Pitiot =

French screenwriter and film director (born 1970)

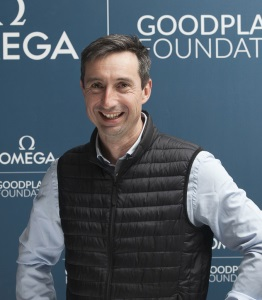
- Goodplanet Foundation, 2016
- Born: 14 July 1970 (age 56); Bagneux (city), France
- Occupations: Film director, screenwriter

Michael Pitiot (born 14 July 1970) is a French screenwriter and film director. He lives and works in France.

== Life and career ==
Michael Pitiot shot his first reportages in Zaïre in 1991. He was then recruited as audiovisual attaché at the French embassy in Vietnam, responsible for cooperation with radio and television in Ho Chi Minh City, a position he occupied from 1993 to 1998.

From 1998 to 2000, he travelled back to France aboard a Chinese junk christened Sao Mai and specially built for the journey, with Marielle Laheurte and a team of 30 volunteers from widely differing backgrounds (including the former naval lieutenant Pierre Guillaume, also known as Crabe-Tambour). He produced a documentary for France2 and wrote two accounts of this expedition.

From 2001 to 2003, alongside senior reporter Arnaud de la Grange, he organised a circumnavigation of Africa with 12 well-known writers including Erik Orsenna, Jean-Marie Gustave Le Clézio and Jean-Christophe Rufin. He also directed a documentary series on this literary and journalistic voyage entitled Portes d’Afrique, for Arte. In 2003, he filmed a road movie through the former Soviet empire in Super8 with Laurent Lepesant that took him to Afghanistan. In 2004 he wrote an account of a voyage to Bhutan to discover its temple carpenter-builders with the illustrator Cloé Fontaine, who later became his wife.

Starting in 2006, he wrote a film script with journalist Daniel Duhand on the forgotten history of the «Poilus d’Alaska» (huskies) in 1915. The same year he joined Tara Expéditions to develop documentaries of its mission. In parallel, in 2009 he published a history of piracy, illustrated by Ségolène Marbach. In 2010, he produced a documentary series in four episodes for France Télévisions on the Tara Oceans mission, co-written with Thierry Ragobert and Frédéric Lossignol and with original music by Gérard Cohen-Tannugi.

Shortly afterwards he met the ecologist and photographer Yann Arthus Bertrand, with whom he co-produced Planet Ocean, a feature-length documentary about man and the ocean. This film, produced thanks to the support of the Omega brand, won the Best Cinematography Award at the Monterey Blue Festival (California, USA). This was the first film produced during a four-year collaboration which also gave birth to three new feature-length documentaries with Yann Arthus-Bertrand: Méditerranée in 2013, which looks at the development of human civilisations in the Mediterranean basin, with the voice of Gérard Darmon and Hiam Abbass; Algérie, an emotional journey to the heart of Algeria, narrated by Jalil Lespert. The film was aired in France and Algeria the same day in July 2015; and TERRA, the sequel of Planet Ocean, a film dedicated to the story of mankind and life, narrated by Vanessa Paradis. Terra was premiered in December 2015 for the COP21 and available worldwide on Netflix by 2016.

In parallel, Michael Pitiot has devoted his time to writing fictional projects.

== Filmography ==
- 2001 : L'Odyssée de Sao Mai, 52 minutes, France 2
- 2003 : Durban Zulu, 26 minutes, Arte
- 2004 : Rivages d’Afrique, Côte Est, 52 minutes, Voyage
- 2005 : Rivages d’Afrique, Côte Ouest, 52 minutes, Voyage
- 2006 : Poilus d’Alaska, 90 mn, with Duhand et Jampolsky, Arte, Radio-Canada
- 2008 : Tara, journey to the climate machine, 90mn, Roblin and Ragobert, Arte
- 2009 : Au cœur d’une expédition polaire, 52 minutes, Planète
- 2010 : The great Bloom, 52 minutes, France3, Pathé
- 2010 : The Sacred Pact, 52 minutes, France3, Pathé
- 2010 : The secret world, 52 minutes, France3, Pathé
- 2011 : A lost Alliance, 52 minutes, France3, Pathé
- 2012 : Tara Ocean, journey to the sources of life, 90 min, France5
- 2012 : Planet Ocean, with Y. Arthus-Bertrand, 90min, France2, Universal Studios
- 2013 : Mediterranean with Gérard Darmon, 90 min, France2, Universal Studios
- 2015 : Algeria, with Y. Arthus-Bertrand, Yazid Tizi, Jalil Lespert, 90min, France2
- 2015 : Thalassa. Le Climat, with Christophe Cousin, 110 min, France3
- 2016 : Terra, with Y. Arthus-Bertrand, Vanessa Paradis, 90 min, France2, Netflix
- 2017 : Maroc vu du ciel, 90 minutes, France Télévision, with Ali Baddou and Yann Arthus-Bertrand, France Télévisions
- 2018 : Orient-Express, (script only) by Louis-Pascal Couvelaire, 90 min, Arte
- 2018 : Men from Earth, with Laurent Stocker, 100 min, BBC, France Televisions
- 2019 : Egypte vue du ciel, 90 min, with Pio Marmaï Yann Arthus-Bertrand, France Televisions
- 2020 : In conversation with Eileen Gray, 24 min, Bard Graduate Center
