= Algeria from Above =

2015 documentary film

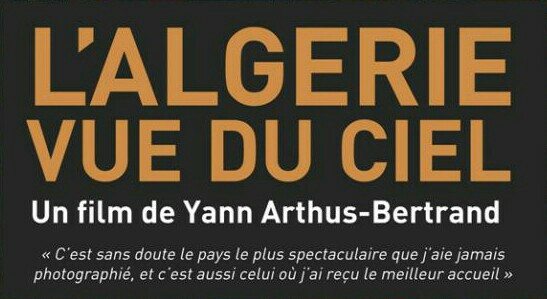
- Film poster
- Directed by: Yann Arthus-Bertrand, Yazid Tizi
- Narrated by: Jalil Lespert
- Production company: Hope Production
- Release date: June 16, 2015 (France)
- Countries: France, Algeria

Algeria from above (French: L'Algérie vue du ciel) is a 2015 French-Algerian documentary film directed by Yann Arthus-Bertrand and Yazid Tizi. The film showcases the beauty and diversity of Algeria, the largest country in Africa and the Mediterranean, through stunning aerial shots. The film was narrated by Jalil Lespert, a French actor and director of Algerian origin, who addresses his brother who stayed in Algeria and tells him about the country's history, culture, and natural wonders.

The film is the first documentary made entirely from the sky on Algeria. It covers various regions and aspects of Algeria, from the bustling coastal cities to the majestic Atlas mountains, from the serene oases of the Sahara to the fertile hills of the Sahel. The film also explores the rich and complex past of Algeria, where different civilizations and influences have left their mark. The film is a tribute to Algeria and its people, and a celebration of their resilience and diversity.

The film was released on June 16, 2015, in France, and received positive reviews from critics and audiences. It was praised for its cinematography, narration, and music. The film was produced by Hope Production, a company founded by Arthus-Bertrand to create documentaries that raise awareness about environmental and social issues. The film was also supported by the Algerian Ministry of Culture and the Algerian National Office of Tourism.
