= GoodPlanet Foundation =

Foundation in France

- Foundation GoodPlanet
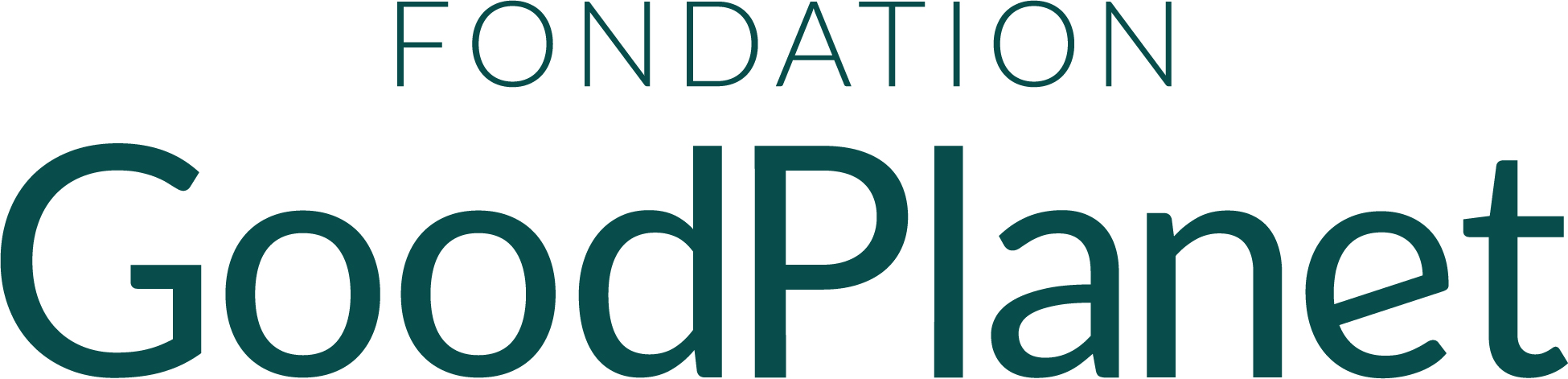
- Formation: 2005; 21 years ago
- Founders: Yann Arthus-Bertrand
- Type: Non-governmental organization
- Purpose: Ecology, Sustainable development
- Headquarters: Paris, France
- Official language: French
- Board of directors: Yann Arthus-Bertrand, Founder and President; Olivier Dulac, representing BNP Paribas; Thierry Lombard, representing Lombard Odier Darier Hentsch & Cie; Olivier Le Grand, representing Cortal Consors
- Website: goodplanet.org

The GoodPlanet Foundation is a non-governmental organization founded by Yann Arthus-Bertrand in 2005, supporting ecology and sustainable development.

== Activities ==
The GoodPlanet Foundation is mainly concerned with the distribution of pedagogic documents and the organization of events for raising awareness of the importance of sustainable development such as the ecology film-festival "GoodPlanet" in Rio de Janeiro, the exhibition "6 billion others", conferences and events for enterprises.

It creates posters for educational institutions about topics such as the Bee Movie development, bio-diversity, and forests. It publishes a catalog of consumer products it considers environmentally responsible.

It also organizes its activities through websites. It leads actioncarbone.org, a stock promotion program aimed at reducing emissions of greenhouse gases, which includes a service offsetting CO_{2} emissions. It also manages the site, goodplanet.info, established in 2009, which is an educational website aimed at informing the public about sustainable development. It finances school projects and environment-conservation projects.

In 2009, the mayor of Bordeaux, Alain Juppé, was elected Vice-President of GoodPlanet. It handled the international distribution of Human which premiered on 12 September 2015.

In 2011, the GoodPlanet foundation was quoted in a parliamentary information report by deputies Geneviève Gaillard and Jean-Marie Sermier, asking for more transparency from environmental associations. They question in particular the fact that the foundation supported Qatar's candidacy for the organization of the 2022 FIFA World Cup.

== See also ==
- Corporate social responsibility
- Philanthropy
