= Mia and the White Lion =

2018 film directed by Gilles de Maistre

- French theatrical release poster
- Directed by: Gilles de Maistre
- Written by: Prune de Maistre; William Davies
- Produced by: Valentine Perrin; Jacques Perrin; Nicolas Elghozi; Gilles de Maistre; Stephane Simon; Catherine Caborde
- Starring: Daniah De Villiers; Mélanie Laurent; Langley Kirkwood
- Cinematography: Brendan Barnes
- Edited by: Julien Rey
- Music by: Armand Amar
- Production companies: Galatée Films; Outside Films; Film Afrika; Pandora Film; M6 Films
- Distributed by: StudioCanal (France)
- Release dates: 26 December 2018 (France); 1 February 2019 (Germany); 12 April 2019 (United States)
- Running time: 98 minutes
- Countries: France; Germany; South Africa
- Languages: English; French
- Budget: €8.7 million
- Box office: $36.4 million

Mia and the White Lion (French: Mia et le lion blanc) is a French-German-South African 2018 family adventure film directed by Gilles de Maistre. The film stars Daniah de Villiers, Mélanie Laurent, and Langley Kirkwood. It was released in France on 26 December 2018 and in the United States on 12 April 2019.

== Plot ==
Ten-year-old Mia Owen has her life turned upside down when her family decides to leave London to manage a lion farm in Africa. When a white lion, Charlie, is born, Mia finds happiness once again and develops a special bond with the growing cub.

When Charlie grows too old to be kept in the house, Mia's father, John, decides to place the growing lion into an enclosure away from all human contact. When Mia's brother, Mick, is injured by Charlie, Mia's parents forbid her from interacting with Charlie, warning her that, if she does, they will sell him for money. Mia defies her father's instructions, and, in retaliation, her father opts to sell Charlie, and Mia is shocked to discover that the farm she lives on is selling lions to be shot by trophy hunters to make money. Determined to save Charlie from this cruel practice, she drives across South Africa with him, intending to release him into the Timbavati Game Reserve, a refuge for the iconic white lions.

However, a trophy hunter named Dirk who does business with John is set on making Charlie his next trophy and sets out across the country to get him. Mia's family also pursue her with the intention of stopping the government from having Mia imprisoned for harboring a dangerous predator.

Mia and Charlie arrive at the Timbavati Game Reserve, where Dirk and his companion ambush them. Charlie manages to attack Dirk and escape with Mia. When Mia's family and the police spot Charlie and Mia entering the game reserve, the police attempt to shoot Charlie but may no longer do so once he is safely inside. Sometime later, Mia and her family revisit the Timbavati Game Reserve and are delighted to see that Charlie has mated with a lioness and has a litter of cubs.

== Cast ==
- Daniah De Villiers as Mia Owen
- Thor as Charlie the lion
- Langley Kirkwood as John Owen
- Mélanie Laurent as Alice Owen
- Ryan Mac Lennan as Mick Owen
- Lionel Newton as Kevin
- Lillian Dube as Jodie
- Brandon Auret as Dirk
- Elvis as Trevor
- Benjamin Garrad as Daniel
- Andrew Stock as Theuns
- Ashleigh Harvey as School Teacher
- David Clatworthy as Mr. Kruger
- Craig Wainwright as Football Coach

== Production ==
Directed by French director Gilles de Maistre, the expansive production was filmed over the course of three years so that the film's young stars Daniah De Villiers and Ryan Mac Lennon could bond and develop real relationships with the lions and other animals that appear in the film. The scenes between the actors and the animals in the film are real and not reliant on CGI. Mélanie Laurent, Langley Kirkwood, Brandon Auret and Lillian Dube also star.

Kevin Richardson, a lion expert also known as the "Lion Whisperer", oversaw the entire production process and all interactions between the lions and the children ensuring the safety of the animals, cast and crew on set.

The film is based on an original story written by de Maistre's wife, Prune de Maistre, after they visited lion-breeding farms in South Africa. The screenplay is written by Prune de Maistre and William Davies. The film is co-produced by Studiocanal, M6 Films, Film Afrika and Pandora film and created in collaboration with Canal+, Cine+, M6, W9 and Film-und Medienstiftung NRW in partnership with Kevin Richardson.

== Reception ==
=== Box office ===
Mia and the White Lion is currently the highest-grossing French production outside France in 2019, accumulating a total of 2.43 million spectators (€13 million in box office revenues) in 25 markets around the world, including 900,000 admissions in Italy (€5.62 million) and 264,000 admissions in Colombia (€625,000).

=== Critical response ===
Reviews were broadly positive. On review aggregator Rotten Tomatoes, the film holds an approval rating of 88% based on 17 reviews, with an average rating of 6.9/10. On Metacritic, the film has a weighted average score of 52 out of 100, based on 6 critics, indicating "mixed or average reviews".
