= Gilles de Maistre =

French journalist and filmmaker

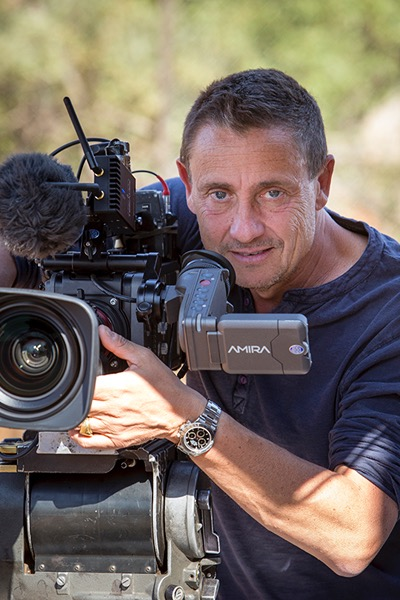
- Born: 8 May 1960 (age 65); Boulogne-Billancourt, France
- Occupations: Screenwriter; film director; film producer; actor; cinematographer; journalist
- Years active: 1988–present

Gilles de Maistre (born 8 May 1960) is a French filmmaker, journalist, and actor who was nominated for a César Award.

== Career ==
Gilles de Maistre graduated with a degree in philosophy from the University of Paris X Nanterre in 1983, and further graduated from the Journalist Training Center in 1985, where he trained as a journalist and image reporter. He began by producing reports and documentaries for television, notably for Sygma Télévision and the CAPA agency. He travels around the world to denounce, alert and inform regarding wars, famines, guerrillas, homelessness, violence or natural disasters.

In order to manage his own films, in 1990 he founded his first production house, Tetra Media, and became director-producer.

== Personal life ==
He is married to screenwriter Prune de Maistre and has six children. He is a half-brother of Patrice de Maistre and is a grand-nephew of the director René Clément. He is a descendant of the philosopher Joseph de Maistre.

== Filmography ==
| Year | Title | Role | Notes |
|---|---|---|---|
| 1988 | Preuve d'amour | Actor | Directed by Miguel Courtois |
| 1990 | J'ai 12 ans et je fais la guerre | Director | TV Movie Documentary; Albert Londres Prize - Audio-Visual; Nominated - CableACE Award for International Informational Special |
| 1994 | Killer Kid | Director, writer & associate Producer | Cinekid Festival - Cinekid Lion - Jury award |
| 1996 | La femme rêvée | Actor | TV Movie directed by Miguel Courtois |
| 1997 | Bouge! | Producer | Directed by Jérôme Cornuau |
| 1998 | Le chant de l'homme mort | Producer & actor | TV Movie directed by Jérôme Cornuau |
| 1999 | Premières neiges | Producer | TV Movie directed by Gaël Morel |
| 1999 | Une journée de merde! | Actor | Directed by Miguel Courtois |
| 2000 | De la lumière quand même | Producer | Documentary directed by Manuel Poirier |
| 2000 | Le lycée | Producer | TV Series (6 episodes) directed by Miguel Courtois |
| 2002 | Féroce | Director, writer & producer | Nominated - Cairo International Film Festival - Golden Pyramid |
| 2002 | Squash | Producer | Short directed by Lionel Bailliu |
| 2003 | Dissonances | Executive Producer | Directed by Jérôme Cornuau |
| 2004 | La citadelle Europe | Director, writer, producer & cinematographer | TV Movie Documentary |
| 2005 | Urgence enfants | Director | TV Movie Documentary |
| 2005 | Les alchimistes aux fourneaux | Director | TV Series Documentary |
| 2005 | Le premier jour | Actor | Short by Luc Saint-Sernin |
| 2007 | The First Cry | Director, writer, producer & cinematographer | Documentary; Nominated - César Award for Best Documentary Film |
| 2009 | Grands reporters | Director, writer & producer | TV Movie |
| 2010 | Empreintes | Director & writer | TV Series Documentary |
| 2011 | Voir le pays du matin calme | Director, producer & cinematographer | TV Movie |
| 2012 | L.A: Gangs de femmes | Producer | TV Movie Documentary directed by Stephanie Lamorre |
| 2013 | Jusqu'au bout du monde | Director & writer | TV Movie |
| 2015 | 3 Mariages et un coup de foudre | Director | TV Movie |
| 2015 | Lundi en histoires | Director & producer | TV Series (1 Episode) |
| 2015 | Le monde en face | Director | TV Series Documentary |
| 2017 | The Quest of Alain Ducasse | Director, writer & producer | Film |
| 2018 | Mia and the White Lion | Director | Film |
| 2019 | Forward: Tomorrow Belongs To Us | Director | Documentary |
| 2021 | The Wolf and the Lion | Director | Film |
| 2024 | Autumn and the Black Jaguar | Director | Film |
| 2025 | Moon the Panda | Director | Film |
