= Yann Arthus-Bertrand =

French photographer (born 1946)

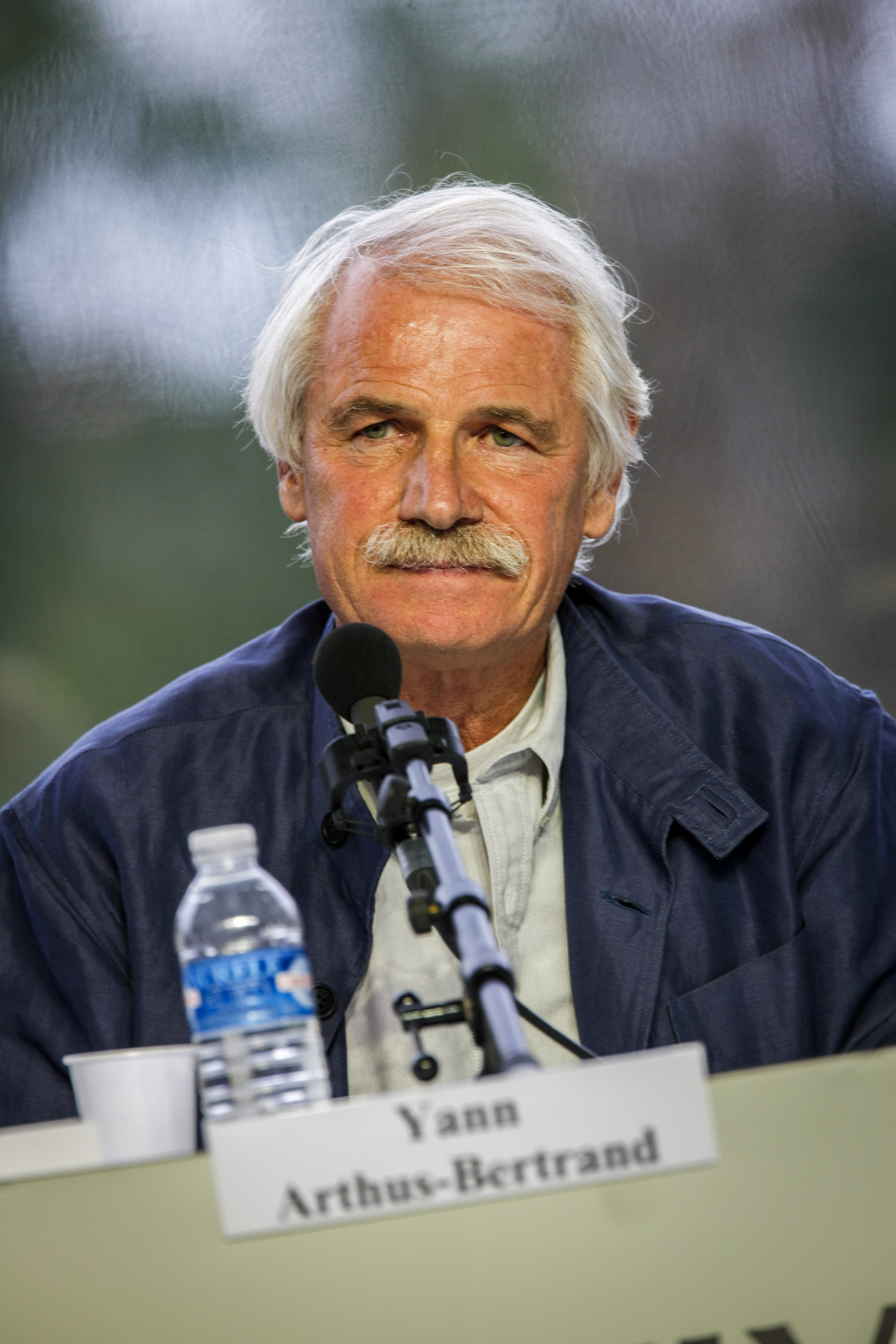
- Arthus-Bertrand in 2009
- Born: 13 March 1946 (age 80); Paris, France
- Occupations: Photographer, journalist, reporter, film director, environmentalist
- Years active: 1963–
- Known for: Earth from Above (1999); Home (2009); Human (2015)

Yann Arthus-Bertrand (French pronunciation: [jan aʁtys bɛʁtʁɑ̃]; born 13 March 1946) is a French environmentalist, activist, journalist and photographer. He has also directed films about the impact of humans on the planet. He is especially well known for his book Earth from Above (1999) and his films Home (2009) and Human (2015). It is because of this commitment that Yann Arthus-Bertrand was designated Goodwill Ambassador for the United Nations Environment Programme on Earth Day (22 April 2009).

== Early life ==
Yann Arthus-Bertrand was born in Paris on 13 March 1946 in a renowned jewellers' family founded in 1803 by Claude Arthus-Bertrand and Michel-Ange Marion. His sister Catherine is one of his closest collaborators. He has been interested in nature and wildlife from an early age.

== First jobs ==
In 1963 when he was 17, he became an assistant director, then an actor in movies. He played alongside famous actors such as Michèle Morgan in Dis-moi qui tuer (1965) by Etienne Perier and in OSS 117 prend des vacances (1970) by Pierre Kalfon.

He gave up the movie industry in 1967 to run the Château de Saint Augustin wildlife park in Château-sur-Allier (centre of France). He then left the country with his wife Anne when he was 30 (1976) to live in Kenya in the Masai Mara National Reserve. He lived amongst the Maasai tribe for 3 years to study the behaviour of a lions' family and took daily pictures of them during those years. He thus discovered a new passion for photography and the beauty of landscapes when observed from above in hot air balloons, and he came to understand how to communicate using these means.

He came back to France in 1981, published a photograph book Lions in 1983, and became an international journalist, reporter and photographer who specialised in documentaries on sports, wildlife and aerial photography for French magazines such as Paris Match and GEO. He photographed ten Paris-Dakar rallies. Every year he published a book on Roland Garros, the tennis French open. He annually took pictures at the Paris International Agricultural Show, and of ethologist Dian Fossey and gorillas in Rwanda.

== Aerial photography ==
He founded the Altitude Agency in 1991, which was the world's first press agency and images bank specialising in aerial photography (500,000 pictures taken in more than 100 countries by more than 100 photographers).

In 1994 Arthus-Bertrand started a thorough study on the state of the Earth sponsored by UNESCO. As part of the study, he made a picture inventory of the world's most beautiful landscapes, taken from helicopters and hot-air balloons. The book from this project, Earth from Above (La Terre vue du ciel) sold over 3 million copies and was translated into 24 languages.

In 2000, his "Earth from Above" free exhibition was set up on numerous big posters on the gates of the Jardins du Luxembourg in Paris. It then travelled worldwide from Lyon to Montreal, to 110 cities and was visited by 120 million people.

In 2008, Earth from Above was released on DVD. However within the film he backed the Moroccan claim to Western Sahara which caused some disquiet.

== Environmental work ==
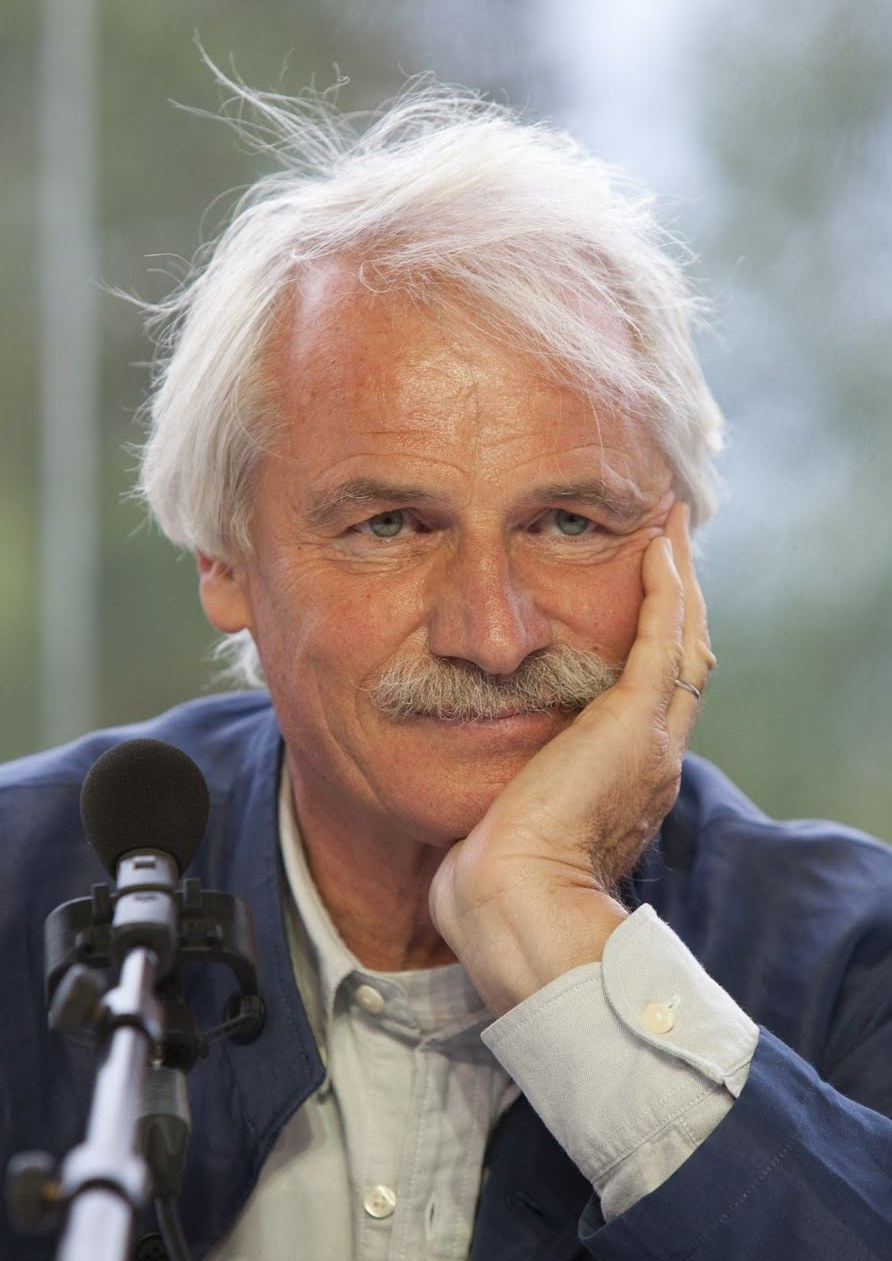
Yann Arthus-Bertrand in 2009

On 1 July 2005, he founded the international environmental organisation GoodPlanet, and set up the programme Action Carbone to offset his own greenhouse gas emissions generated by his helicopter transports. Since then this program has evolved to help people and companies to reduce and offset their climate impact by funding projects on renewable energies, energy efficiency and reforestation.

Since then, the organisation has been involved in several projects:

- School posters: posters are distributed for free in every French school on a different environmental theme each year (sustainable development in 2006, biodiversity in 2007 and energy in 2008).
- 6 billion Others: a video exhibition took place in early 2009 at the Grand Palais in Paris. Over 5,000 videos were shown. They were recorded around the globe showing women and men talking about universal themes such as happiness, sorrow, life, death, love, hatred and so on.
- Alive: a photography exhibition that travels around the world with a text display describing the impact of man on the environment
- Good Planet Info: international news website on the environment
- Good Planet Junior: some holiday trips in protected areas offered to children to teach them how to preserve the environment
- Good Planet Conso: a non-profit website to help people adopt a more environmentally-friendly way of life

Arthus-Bertrand was made a Knight of the Légion d'honneur (national order of the legion of honour) and a Knight of the Ordre du Mérite Agricole (national order of agricultural merit). He was also made Officer of the Ordre National du Mérite (national order of merit) by President Nicolas Sarkozy in June 2008. Moreover, he was elected alongside Lucien Clergue at the Académie des Beaux Arts (academy of fine arts).

In 2006, he launched a series of documentaries called Vu du ciel (Seen from Above) for the French public channels. The 5th episode was aired in December 2007 and was about agriculture. The same year, he published Algeria From Above, which offers a brand-new view of this country.

In April 2007 he started directing a film originally called Boomerang, later re-titled Home. The film was produced by Luc Besson and financed by the PPR group (a French multinational company). It was Arthus-Bertrand's intention to show the state of our planet and the challenges humanity faces. The emissions of greenhouse gases produced by the movie's shooting were offset through Arthus-Bertrand's organisation GoodPlanet and its 'Action Carbone' program. The film was released internationally on 5 June 2009. On the night of its release, many theatres offered screening for free and an open-air screening at the Champ-de-Mars in Paris drew 20,000 spectators. The aerial photography, music score and high post-production values were intended to create a more emotional response than most previous films about the subject. The simultaneous TV broadcast of the film on the France 2 TV channel drew more than 8 million people. The following Sunday, at the European elections, the environmentalist coalition Europe Écologie made an unexpectedly strong showing. On the night of the elections, many political commentators expressed concerns that the film screening may have influenced the result.

Home is available on DVD and via free streaming on the internet (Arthus-Bertrand gave up his author's rights).

On 19 March 2008, he was given the Georges Pompidou Award which rewards a cultural personality each year (2006: painter Pierre Soulages, 2005: orchestra conductor William Christie).

Since 2008, he has participated in the board of directors of the Fondation Chirac, a foundation launched in 2008 by former French President Jacques Chirac in order to promote world peace through five advocacy programmes, two of which deal with environmental issues such as access to fresh water, desertification and deforestation.

A few schools have been named after Yann Arthus-Bertrand (primary schools of Cysoing, Noviant-aux-Prés, Carentoir and Villaines-sous-Bois, nursery schools of Cairanne and Saint-Aignan-de-Cramesnil as well as the Radinghem high school specialised in agriculture). He stated that it was one of the greatest honours he could receive.

In 2008, he launched a project called 6 billion others. It is a video exhibition of people across the world answering the same questions.

On 22 April 2009, he was officially designated as the United Nations Environment Program Goodwill Ambassador (UNEP) and received the "Earth Champion" award for his commitment towards the environment and his work on public environmental awareness.

Arthus-Bertrand also supports the Zeitz Foundation, an organization focused on sustainable development and conservation.

== Awards and honours ==
- 2003: Arthus-Bertrand was awarded an Honorary Fellowship of The Royal Photographic Society. These are awarded to distinguished persons having, from their position or attainments, an intimate connection with the science or fine art of photography or the application thereof.
- 2005: Peintre de la Marine
- 2010: National Outdoor Book Award, Our Living Earth
- 2013: The Royal Geographical Society's Cherry Kearton Medal and Award

== Filmography ==
=== Actor ===
- 1965: Dis-moi qui tuer by Étienne Périer: Galland
- 1970: OSS 117 prend des vacances by Pierre Kalfon: Yann

=== Director ===
- 2003: 7 Billion Others (formerly 6 Billion Others)
- 2004: Earth from Above
- 2009: Home, available on-line.
- 2010: Paris, view from above
- 2012: Planet Ocean
- 2013: Metz and the Messin pays, view from above
- 2014: Switzerland from above for Switzerland Tourism, available on-line.
- 2015: Terra
- 2015: Algeria from above
- 2015: Human, available on-line.
- 2020: Woman
- 2021: Legacy, notre héritage
- 2023: Vibrant (Vivant)
