= Planet Ocean =

2012 film by Yann Arthus-Bertrand

Planet Ocean, 2012, is a documentary film co-directed by Yann Arthus-Bertrand and Michael Pitiot. The documentary is about the history of the organisms that live in the ocean, and the relationships they have with each other and with humans. The film's cinematographers are Yann Arthus-Bertrand, who is known for his aerial photography, and Michael Pitiot.

== Plot ==
In this film composed of aerial and underwater footage, Yann Arthus-Bertrand and Michael Pitiot explore the chain of life in the ocean from its origins to the present day. This ecological journey leads to the heart of the planet 's little-known regions and into the world of the strangest life forms. It explains how everything that lives is interconnected and also leads back to humankind and its precarious existence on an ocean planet that it has come to control. The film addresses, in particular, the issues of industrial fishing, pollution, and environmental impact, while also questioning humanity 's capacity to determine its own destiny.
