= 28th Singapore International Film Festival =

2017 film festival

- Opening film: Angels Wear White by Vivian Qu
- Location: Singapore
- Festival date: 23 November–3 December 2017
- Website: sgiff.com

Singapore International Film Festival
- 29th 27th

The 28th annual Singapore International Film Festival took place from 23 November to 3 December 2017 in Singapore. The festival opened with Vivian Qu's thriller film Angels Wear White.

Drama film Disappearance won the festival's main award Silver Screen Award for Best Asian Film. The Honorary Award was presented to the Indonesian filmmaker Garin Nugroho. Japanese actor Koji Yakusho received the Cinema Legend Award.

== Juries ==
=== Asian Feature Film Competition ===
- Shekhar Kapur – Indian filmmaker – Head of Jury
- Ana Lily Amirpour – American filmmaker
- Mark Peranson – Locarno Film Festival head of programming
- Clara Law – Hong Kong filmmaker

=== Southeast Asian Short Film Competition ===
- Kenji Ishizaka – Tokyo International Film Festival programmer and lecturer – Head of Jury
- K. Rajagopal – Singaporean filmmaker
- Marsha Timothy – Indonesian actress

== Official selection ==
=== Festival Opening and Special Presentation ===
English title	Original title	Director(s)	Production countrie(s)
Opening film
Angels Wear White	嘉年华	Vivian Qu	China
Special Presentation
Oh Lucy!		Atsuko Hirayanagi	Japan, United States
The Song of Scorpions		Anup Singh	Switzerland, France, India, Singapore
The White Girl	白色女孩	Jenny Suen, Christopher Doyle	Hong Kong, Malaysia, Japan

=== Asian Feature Film Competition ===
English title	Original title	Director(s)	Production countrie(s)
Disappearance	ناپدید شدن	Ali Asgari	Iran, Qatar
Dragonfly Eyes	蜻蜓之眼	Xu Bing	China
The Great Buddha+	大佛普拉斯	Huang Hsin-yao	Taiwan
Malila: The Farewell Flower		Anucha Boonyawatana	Thailand
Scaffolding	פיגומים	Matan Yair	
Scary Mother	საშიში დედა	Ana Urushadze	Georgia, Estonia
The Seen and Unseen	Sekala Niskala	Kamila Andini	Indonesia, Netherlands, Australia, Qatar
Shuttle Life	分贝人生	Tan Seng Kiat	Malaysia

=== Southeast Asian Short Film Competition ===
English title	Original title	Director(s)	Production countrie(s)
83 Soi Soonvijai 14	83 ซอยศูนย์วิจัย 14	T-Thawat Taifayongvichit	Thailand
A Bed Without a Guilt		Ivan Tan	United Kingdom, Singapore
Between Us Two		Tan Wei Keong	Singapore
Death of the Sound Man	Awasarn Sound Man	Sorayos Prapapan	Thailand
Ephemera	Muộn	Ho Thanh Thao	Vietnam
Five Trees	五丛树下	Nelson Yeo	Singapore
It's Easier to Raise Cattle	Lagi Senang Jaga Sekandang Lembu	Amanda Nell Eu	Malaysia
Jodilerks Dela Cruz, Employee of the Month		Carlo Francisco Manatad	Philippines
Joko		Suryo Wiyogo	Indonesia
Kampung Tapir		Aw See Wee	Malaysia
The Malediction	Ruah	Makbul Mubarak	Indonesia
Puppy Love	Nung Nawala Ang Aso Ko	Margarita Mina	Philippines
Song X		Mont Tesprateep	Thailand
The Sound of Coins Hitting Brass		Andrew Stephen Lee	Philippines, United States
Suerte		Carlo Fajarda	Philippines

=== Cinema Today ===
English title	Original title	Director(s)	Production countrie(s)
A Skin So Soft	Ta peau si lisse	Denis Côté	Canada
BPM (Beats per Minute)	120 battements par minute	Robin Campillo	France
Call Me by Your Name		Luca Guadagnino	Italy, United States, Brazil, France
Closeness	Теснота	Kantemir Balagov	Russia
Cocote		Nelson Carlo de Los Santos Arias	Dominican Republic, Argentina, Germany, Qatar
Columbus		Kogonada	United States
The Endless		Justin Benson and Aaron Moorhead	United States
The Florida Project		Sean Baker	United States
God's Own Country		Francis Lee	United Kingdom
The Killing of a Sacred Deer		Yorgos Lanthimos	Ireland, United Kingdom
Mutafukaz		Shōjirō Nishimi, Guillaume "Run" Renard	France, Japan
Song of Granite		Pat Collins	Ireland, United Kingdom
The Square		Ruben Östlund	Sweden, Germany, France, Denmark
Sweet Country		Warwick Thornton	Australia
The Venerable W.	Le vénérable W.	Barbet Schroeder	France, Switzerland
The Wound	Inxeba	John Trengove	South Africa, France, Germany, Austria
Zama		Lucrecia Martel	Argentina, Brazil, Spain, France, Netherlands, Mexico, Portugal, United States

=== Asian Vision ===
English title	Original title	Director(s)	Production countrie(s)
Ajji		Devashish Makhija	India
Aqérat (We, The Dead)	阿奇洛	Edmund Yeo	Malaysia
Blank 13		Takumi Saitoh	Japan
The Brawler	Mukkabaaz	Anurag Kashyap	India
Claire's Camera		Hong Sang-soo	South Korea, France
The First Lap	초행	Kim Dae-hwan	South Korea
Flower in the Pocket (2007)	口袋裏的花	Liew Seng Tat	Malaysia
Homogeneous, Empty Time	สุญกาล	Thunska Pansittivorakul, Harit Srikhao	Thailand
In the Claws of a Century Wanting	Sa Palad ng Dantaong Kulang	Jewel Maranan	Philippines, Germany, Qatar
Marlina the Murderer in Four Acts	Marlina si Pembunuh dalam Empat Babak	Mouly Surya	Indonesia, France, Malaysia, Thailand
Mrs. Fang	方绣英	Wang Bing	China, France, Germany
No Date, No Signature	بدون تاریخ، بدون امضاء	Vahid Jalilvand	Iran
Phantom of Illumination	นิรันดร์ราตรี	Wattanapume Laisuwanchai	Thailand
Posesif		Edwin	Indonesia
Radiance		Naomi Kawase	Japan, France
Ryuichi Sakamoto: Coda		Stephen Nomura Schible	Japan, United States
Samui Song	ไม่มีสมุยสำหรับเธอ	Pen-ek Ratanaruang	Thailand, Germany, Norway
Sexy Durga		Sanal Kumar Sasidharan	India

=== Singapore Panorama ===
English title	Original title	Director(s)	Production countrie(s)
Diamond Dogs	钻石狗	Gavin Lim	Singapore
hUSh		Djenar Maesa Ayu, Kan Lumé	Indonesia, Singapore
I Not Stupid (2002)	小孩不笨	Jack Neo	Singapore
I Want to Go Home		Wesley Leon Aroozoo	Singapore, Japan
Shadows of Fiendish Ancestress and Occasionally Parajanov on Durian Cialis (Lesser #9)		Chew Tze Chuan	Singapore, Japan, Philippines
Talking Cock the Movie (2002)		Colin Goh, Woo Yen Yen	Singapore
Shorts
Angel		Don Aravind	Singapore
Areola Borealis		Wee Li Lin	Singapore
Benjamin's Last Day at Katong Swimming Complex		Chai Yee Wei	Singapore
Mei Ling Street		Ric Aw	Singapore
Melodi		Michael Kam	Singapore
Rehearsal		Jonathan Choo, Rachel Liew, Shammini G	Singapore
Return to Sender		Gan Chin Lin	Singapore
Rotan		Hamzah Fansuri	Singapore
Stitches	தையல்	Laavania Krishna	Singapore
White Carnations	康乃馨	Tang Wan Xin	Singapore
Yume	梦	Grace Swee	United States, Japan, Singapore

=== Midnight Mayhem ===
English title	Original title	Director(s)	Production countrie(s)
It Comes at Night		Trey Edward Shults	United States
Jailbreak		Jimmy Henderson	Cambodia
Mayhem		Joe Lynch	United States
Salvage: Malay Wild		Sherad Anthony Sanchez	Philippines

=== Classics ===
English title	Original title	Director(s)	Production countrie(s)
The Hand of Fate (1954)	운명의 손	Han Hyeong-mo	South Korea
The Man from Hong Kong (1975)		Brian Trenchard-Smith	Hong Kong, Australia
The One Armed Executioner (1981)		Bobby A. Suarez	Philippines
Operation Lightning (1966)	Gerak Kilat	Jamil Sulong	Singapore
Operation Lipstick (1966)		Inoue Umetsugu	Hong Kong
Operation Revenge (1967)	ทรชนคนสวย	Ubol Yugala	Thailand

== Awards ==
The following awards were presented at the festival:

=== Asian Film Feature Competition ===
- Best Film: Disappearance by Ali Asgari
  - Special Mention: Scaffolding by Matan Yair
- Best Director: Anucha Boonyawatana for Malila: The Farewell Flower
- Best Performance: Sadaf Asgari for Disappearance

=== Southeast Asian Short Film ===
- Best Southeast Asian Short Film: Jodilerks Dela Cruz, Employee Of The Month by Carlo Francisco Manatad
  - Special Mention: The Malediction by Makbul Mubarak
- Best Director: Sorayos Prapapan for Death of the Sound Man
- Best Singapore Short Film: Between Us Two by Tan Wei Keong

=== Other awards ===
- Youth Jury Prize: Death of the Sound Man by Sorayos Prapapan
- Audience Choice Award: Call Me by Your Name by Luca Guadagnino
- Inspiring Woman in Film Award: Ana Urushadze for Scary Mother

=== Honorary Award ===
- Garin Nugroho

=== Cinema Legend Award ===
- Koji Yakusho
