= Luxembourg City Film Festival =

Film festival in Luxembourg

- 2024 edition poster
- Location: Luxembourg
- Established: 2011
- Most recent: 2026
- Awards: The Grand Prix
- Directors: Georges Santer, Glady Lazareff
- Hosted by: Ministry of Culture and the City of Luxembourg; Luxembourg City Film Festival
- Artistic director: Alexis Juncosa
- Festival date: Opening: 5 March 2026; Closing: 15 March 2026
- Website: https://www.luxfilmfest.lu/

Current: 16th
- 17th 15th

Luxembourg City Film Festival (LuxFilmFest) is an annual film festival in Luxembourg. Supported by the Ministry of Culture and the City of Luxembourg, the Luxembourg City Film Festival is the nation's official festival. The festival showcases contemporary international creations through a selection of fiction and documentaries, special screenings, national productions, and a segment for young audiences.

== Profile ==
Luxembourg City Film Festival was launched in 2011, it is the country's official film festival and is supported by the Ministry of Culture and the City of Luxembourg. From the start, its artistic director was Alexis Junkosa, while Colette Flesch served as chair of the festival's board of directors. She stepped down in 2020 and was succeeded by Georges Santer.

The festival sections include Grand Prix competition with an award coming with a €10000 prize, Documentary Prize competition with a prize of €5000, and an out-of-competition segment Made in Luxembourg. The festival also hosts LUXFILMFEST FABRIC (masterclasses and workshops), LUXFILMFEST CLUB, and Virtual Reality Pavilion. The Crème Fraîche competition targets the audience between 12 and 25 and ultra-short 90-second films and scripts. The winner gets to produce his project under the national youth service. In 2022, with the support of Luxembourg Aid & Development, the 2030 Award was established to honour the films which most powerfully illustrate issues of development or directors linked to the partner countries of the Luxembourg Cooperation.

Apart from the main festival events, the team manages numerous one-off screenings and outside activities, including the Young Audience Award in collaboration with the European Film Academy, the Holocaust Memorial Day, etc. The Industry Days section, dedicated to cinema professionals, offers pitching sessions, workshops and open talks.

In 2018, the festival had record attendance of 30,500 visitors.

In 2022, MovieMaker ranked LuxFilmFest one of the 25 coolest film festivals in the world.

== Editions ==
=== 2021 ===
The 11th edition ran from 4 to 14 March 2021. It was held in a hybrid format amidst the COVID-19 pandemic, more than 4,200 viewers attended the physical screenings while 20,000 more viewers registered on the event's online platform.

=== 2022 ===
The 12th edition ran from 3 to 13 March 2022. The 2030 Award by Luxembourg Aid & Development was launched that year. It is awarded to a work that demonstrates its dedication to the fight against poverty, the elimination of hunger around the world, access to healthcare and education, equality between the sexes and access to clean water worldwide.

=== 2023 ===
The 13th edition took place from 2 to 12 March 2023, featuring 256 screenings. The Fipresci award was established that year. Valentina Maurel's I Have Electric Dreams won the Grand Prix.

=== 2024 ===
In 2024, the festival unspooled from 29 February to 10 March and attracted almost 20,000 visitors. The programm featured a retrospective of Gaspar Noé's films as well as a line-up of 123 movies. Nathalie Hertzberg, Marianne Slot, Vicky Krieps, Damián Szifron, and Sebastian Koch served on the international jury, presided by Ira Sachs. The Grand Prix as well as the FIPRESCI Award went to Terrestrial Verses by Ali Asgari and Alireza Khatami. The Documentary Award was given to Reas by Lola Arias, while the 2030 Award was given to The Echo by Tatiana Huezo. The Audience Award went to Gasoline Rainbow by Ross brothers. Viggo Mortensen was honoured with a lifetime achievement award, he also presented his latest film The Dead Don’t Hurt.

=== 2025 ===
The 15th edition took place from for 6 to 16 March 2025. It attracted 21,000 visitors with Alejandro Amenábar, a Chilean-Spanish film director, screenwriter and composer, and Tim Roth, an English actor and director, appearing as the guests of honour.

=== 2026 ===
The 16th edition ran from 5 to 15 March 2026.

== Awards ==
2024

- Grand Prix: Terrestrial Verses – Ali Asgari, Alireza Khatami (Iran)
- Special Mention for Direction: Luna Carmoon – Hoard, (United Kingdom)
- Special Mention for Performance: Kauan Alvarenga – Toll (Brazil/Portugal)
- Honorary Award: Viggo Mortensen
- Documentary Award: Reas – Lola Arias, (Argentina/Switzerland/Germany)
- Special Mention: Hollywoodgate – Ibrahim Nash’at (Germany/USA)
- FIPRESCI Award: Terrestrial Verses – Ali Asgari, Alireza Khatami
- 2030 Award: The Echo – Tatiana Huezo (Mexico/Germany)
- Audience Award: Gasoline Rainbow – Bill Ross IV, Turner Ross (United States)
- VR Award: Noire, la vie méconnue de Claudette Colvin – Stéphane Foenkinos, Pierre-Alain Giraud (France)
- Special Mention: The Fury – Shirin Neshat (United States)
- Youth Jury Prize: 5 Seasons of Revolution – Lina, (Germany/ Syria/ Netherlands/Norway)
- School Jury Award: Scrapper -Charlotte Regan, (United Kingdom)
- Kids’ Jury Award: The House of the Lost on the Cape – Shin’ya Kawatsura, (Japan)

2025

- Grand Prix: The New Year That Never Came – Bogdan Mureşanu, (Romania/Serbia)
- Special Mention: The Village Next to Paradise – Mo Harawe, (Austria/ France/ Germany/ Somalia)
- Documentary Award: The Landscape and the Fury – Nicole Vögele, (Switzerland)
- FIPRESCI Award: The New Year That Never Came – Bogdan Mureşanu
- 2030 Award: The Village Next to Paradise – Mo Harawe
- Audience Award: Went Up the Hill – Samuel Van Grinsven (New Zealand/ Australia)
- Immersive Experience Award: Champ de bataille/Battlefield – François Vautier, (Belgium/ France/ Luxembourg)
- Special Mention: Ito Meikyū – Boris Labbé (France/Luxembourg)
- Youth Jury Prize: Home Game – Lidija Zelović (Netherlands)
- School Jury Award: Winners – Soleen Yusef (Germany)
- Special Mention: Young Hearts – Anthony Schatteman, (Belgium/ Netherlands)
- Kids’ Jury Award: Greetings from Mars – Sarah Winkenstette (Germany)
