= The Things You Kill =

2025 film by Alireza Khatami

- French theatrical release poster
- Turkish: Öldürdüğün Şeyler
- Directed by: Alireza Khatami
- Written by: Alireza Khatami
- Produced by: Alireza Khatami; Elisa Sepulveda Ruddoff; Cyriac Auriol; Mariusz Włodarski; Michael Solomon
- Starring: Ekin Koç; Erkan Kolçak Köstendil; Hazar Ergüçlü; Ercan Kesal
- Cinematography: Bartosz Swiniarski
- Edited by: Alireza Khatami; Selda Taskin
- Production companies: Fulgurance; Remora Films; Lava Films; Tell Tall Tale; Band With Pictures; Sineaktif
- Distributed by: Bir Film (Turkey); Madness Distribution (Poland); Le Pacte (France); Mongrel Media (Canada)
- Release dates: 24 January 2025 (Sundance); 25 April 2025 (Turkey); 23 July 2025 (France)
- Running time: 114 minutes
- Countries: Canada; Turkey; Poland; France
- Language: Turkish

The Things You Kill (Turkish: Öldürdüğün Şeyler) is a 2025 Turkish-language mystery film written and directed by Alireza Khatami. An international co-production between Canada, Turkey, Poland, and France, the film stars Ekin Koç as a university professor who solicits his gardener to seek vengeance after the suspicious death of his mother. Erkan Kolçak Köstendil, Hazar Ergüçlü, and Ercan Kesal provide supporting roles. Khatami, Elisa Sepulveda Ruddoff, Cyriac Auriol, Mariusz Włodarsk, and Michael Solomon co-produced the movie.

The film had its world premiere in the World Cinema Dramatic Competition section of the 2025 Sundance Film Festival on 24 January. It was selected as Canada's submission for the Best International Feature Film award at the 98th Academy Awards, but it was not nominated.

== Premise ==
Ali, a Turkish university professor, is enraged by the suspicious circumstances of his ailing mother's death. During his grieving process, Ali reveals his resentment for his estranged father and befriends a gardener named Reza whom he enlists to avenge his mother's death.

== Plot ==
Turkish literature professor Ali talks to his wife Hazar about the dream she had; she says in the dream, Ali's father knocked on the door of their home, demanded to come inside, then lay down and asked for the light to be turned off.

Ali visits his mother, who was disabled when Ali's father beat her some years before. He notes that their home is dilapidated, with the indoor toilet broken. He also finds a gun in a bag in the septic tank. When he offers to pay for the toilet to be repaired so that her ailing mother doesn't have to use the outhouse, his father shames him and sends him away. He suffers what he feels are other humiliations: he discovers that he has low fertility − a fact he keeps from his wife − and that his teaching position at a local university may be cut.

Ali's mother dies after being found face-down in her locked home. Ali's father, Hamit, found her body, but took a long time to call the family. Ali remonstrates with his father, who shames him in front of his family. He goes home distraught, and says that the regrets returning to Turkey from the US.

At a farm on the city's outskirts that Ali is attempting to revive, he meets Reza, and hires him as a gardener. Reza is intimidated by Ali's large dog. Reza says that the farm will require a deep well to be made fertile, and that will require machinery and planning permission.

As Ali's stress over his infertility and job insecurity grows, so does his isolation from Hazar. He begins to investigate the circumstances of his mother's death. He discovers that she suffered a fatal blow to the back of the head, despite being found face-down. He comes to believe that his father was responsible.

He and Reza kidnap Hamit and make him dig his own shallow grave in the desert. Ali begins to have second thoughts, but Reza beats Hamit unconscious and tells Ali to fill the grave in. Ali begins to cry, but Reza threatens Ali.

Reza chains up Ali at the farm in the shelter where the dog lived − it has now vanished − and assumes his life. Nobody seems to notice. Ali's wife, sick of being shut out, leaves him. Reza, now working Ali's job at a university, agrees to sleep with a pretty student in exchange for giving her a higher grade, but when he takes her back to Ali's parents' home to have sex, he encounters his father's mistress, whom he berates and sends away.

Reza reports Hamit missing and keeps up the pretence among his family. He bribes a local official and has the well dug out on the farm, with Ali chained away out of sight. He admits to Ali's wife about the infertility, and she agrees to return home. They learn that sperm donors are not allowed in Turkey, and decide to sell Hamit's home to raise the money to seek a donor abroad, which upsets Ali's sister, who still believes Hamit might return.

Reza visits Ali's aunt, Hamit's sister, who is fearful for her missing brother. She tells Reza how Ali's father got a scar above his eye: when she was a little girl, a scorpion stung her; Hamit put her on a horse to take her to the hospital, but on the way they met their abusive father, who was so enraged he threw a stick at Hamit, causing a bloody wound. Reza says Hamit always told him that he got the scar falling off a boat. The aunt says Hamit didn't want to make his cruel father look bad.

Reza returns to Hamit's grave and discovers it is empty. He goes to check Ali's chain. Ali pretends to be unconscious, and when Reza is distracted, he rises up and strangles him to death with the chain. He buries Reza's body on the farm and resumes his life, returning home to make love with Hazar.

Hamit's car is pulled out of a dam by the authorities, who believe his body was washed away. Ali tells Hamit's mistress that he is dead. At the farm, Hazar brings him a puppy. At the university, Ali argues for his job to be saved, and explains how he fled Turkey because he was afraid of his father, but that he is not afraid any more.

With the question of his father's death resolved by police, Ali's parents' house goes up for sale. At night, Ali goes to pack up some things, and lies down to sleep on the floor, but is awoken by a knock at the door. His father, bleeding from a head wound, demands to come inside, just as he had in Hazar's dream. He lies down in the same spot that Ali had lain on, and asks for the light to be turned off. Ali complies. As a chorus of dog barks rises outside, Ali hears another knock at the door.

== Cast ==
- Ekin Koç as Ali, a Turkish university professor teaching in the United States
- Erkan Kolçak Köstendil as Reza, a gardener that Ali befriends
- Hazar Ergüçlü as Hazar, Ali's wife
- Ercan Kesal as Hamit, Ali's father

== Production ==
Iranian filmmaker Alireza Khatami wrote, directed, and co-produced The Things You Kill; it was his third feature film following Oblivion Verses (2017) and Terrestrial Verses (2023, which he co-directed with Ali Asgari). Khatami cited the work of David Lynch as one of his primary inspirations for the movie, saying that he was "in awe" of the types of unorthodox stylistic choices made by Lynch that are uncommon in Eastern filmmaking.

Khatami characterized the script as a work of autofiction, telling Variety that he "[doesn't] even know how to show this to [his] family because 70% of it is based on shared experiences". Khatami also stated that he hoped to undermine "what the audience expects from a 'brown filmmaker' ", calling the first half of the film a Trojan horse.

The film was co-produced by Khatami through the studio Tell Tall Tale, Elisa Sepulveda-Ruddoff from the French studio Fulgurance, Cyriac Auriol of Remora Films (France), Mariusz Włodarski of Lava Films (Poland), and Michael Solomon of Band With Pictures (Canada). Marta Gmosińska, Cenk Ünalerzen, and film star Ekin Koç also contributed to the production through the Turkish studio Sineaktif. The film received support from several institutions: Eurimages, the Polish Film Institute, Telefilm Canada, Arte Cofinova, World Cinema Fund, Torino Feature Lab, and the Île-de-France government.

== Release ==
In May 2024, during post-production, Best Friend Forever acquired the international distribution rights to The Things You Kill, and Le Pacte acquired the rights for distribution in France. The film premiered at the 2025 Sundance Film Festival on January 24 and will make its Sundance digital debut on January 30.

It competed in the 'Progressive Cinema Competition - Visions for the World of Tomorrow' section of the 20th Rome Film Festival in October 2025.

== Reception ==
On the review aggregator website Rotten Tomatoes, 97% of 36 critics' reviews are positive. Metacritic, which uses a weighted average, assigned the film a score of 80 out of 100, based on 13 critics, indicating "generally favorable" reviews.

Carlos Aguilar of Variety gave the film a positive review, calling it an "astutely written exercise in paying attention to how one is perceived and using that knowledge to rewrite one’s own narrative". Ryan Lattanzio of IndieWire gave the film an A− grade, writing that it is "like a bad, sweat-breaking dream that leaves you dazed and feverish — and a black-hearted gaze into the poison patriarchy oozes into men’s veins just as much as women".

Jordan Mintzer of The Hollywood Reporter was critical of the film, calling it "stale" and writing that "there’s something about The Things You Kill that ultimately leaves the viewer cold, even if all the strange and awful stuff Ali goes through leads him to finally open up and, perhaps, lighten up".

The film was named the winner of the Best Canadian Film award at the 2025 Vancouver International Film Festival.

The film was named to the Toronto International Film Festival's annual year-end Canada's Top Ten list for 2025.

== See also ==
- List of submissions to the 98th Academy Awards for Best International Feature Film
- List of Canadian submissions for the Academy Award for Best International Feature Film
