= Talking Cock =

Talking Cock may refer to:

- Talking Cock (comedy show), a stand-up comedy show by Richard Herring
- TalkingCock.com, a Singaporean satirical and humour website
- Talking Cock the Movie, a Singaporean film
