= 27th Singapore International Film Festival =

2016 film festival

- Opening film: Interchange by Dain Iskandar Said
- Location: Singapore
- Festival date: 23 November–4 December 2016
- Website: sgiff.com

Singapore International Film Festival
- 28th 26th

The 27th Singapore International Film Festival took place from 23 November to 4 December 2016 in Singapore. The festival opened with fantasy thriller film Interchange by Dain Iskandar Said.

Biographical war drama film White Sun won the festival's main award Silver Screen Award for Best Asian Film. The Honorary Award was presented to the Hong Kong filmmaker Fruit Chan, meanwhile actor Simon Yam received the Cinema Legend award.

== Juries ==
=== Asian Feature Film Competition ===
- Naomi Kawase, Japanese filmmaker, Jury President
- Herman Yau, Hong Kong film director
- Jocelyne Saab, Lebanese film director
- Sunny Pang, Singaporean actor

=== Southeast Asian Short Film Competition ===
- Mira Lesmana, Indonesian film producer, Jury President
- Anderson Le, program director of Hawaiʻi International Film Festival
- Bertrand Lee, Singaporean filmmaker

== Official selection ==
=== Festival Opening and Special Presentation ===
English title	Original title	Director(s)	Production countrie(s)
Interchange (opening film)		Dain Iskandar Said	Malaysia
Special Presentation
Mrs K		Ho Yuhang	Malaysia, Hong Kong
The Road to Mandalay	再见瓦城	Midi Z	Taiwan, France, Germany, Myanmar
Three Sassy Sisters	Ini Kisah Tiga Dara	Nia Dinata	Indonesia

=== Asian Feature Film Competition ===
English title	Original title	Director(s)	Production countrie(s)
By the Time It Gets Dark	ดาวคะนอง	Anocha Suwichakornpong	Thailand, France, Netherlands, Qatar
Leftovers	Turah	Wicaksono Wisnu Legowo	Indonesia
Live from Dhaka		Abdullah Mohammad Saad	Bangladesh
Nokas		Manuel Alberto Maia	Indonesia
Town in a Lake	Matangtubig	Jet Leyco	Philippines
Verge	Eşi̇k	Erkan Tahhuşoğlu, Ayhan Salar	Turkey
Wandering	ธุดงควัตร	Boonsong Nakphoo	Thailand
White Ant	白蚁	Chu Hsien-Che	Taiwan
White Sun	Seto surya	Deepak Rauniyar	Nepal, United States, Qatar, Netherlands
A Yellow Bird		K. Rajagopal	Singapore, France

=== Southeast Asian Short Film Competition ===
English title	Original title	Director(s)	Production countrie(s)
500,000 Years		Chai Siris	Thailand
Anchorage Prohibited	禁止下锚	Chang Wei Liang	Singapore, Taiwan
Another City	Thanh pho khac	Pham Ngoc Lan	Vietnam
Arnie	阿尼	Rina B. Tsou	Philippines, Taiwan
Demos		Danaya Chulphuthiphong	Thailand
Freeze	冻	Nelicia Low	Singapore, Taiwan
Grandma Loleng	Lola Loleng	Che Tagyamon	Philippines
In the Year of Monkey	Prenjak	Wregas Bhanuteja	Indonesia
A Little Tiger		Nutthapon Rakkatham	Thailand
Lost Wonders	Ilalang Ingin Hilang Waktu Siang	Loeloe Hendra	Indonesia
The Mist		Liao Jiekai	Singapore
On the Origin of Fear		Bayu Prihantoro Filemon	Indonesia
Prelude to the General		Pimpaka Towira	Thailand
Still	Hilom	P. R. Patindol	Philippines
Sugar & Spice		Mi Mi Lwin	Myanmar
Taste	Vi	Le Bao	Vietnam

=== Singapore Panorama ===
English title	Original title	Director(s)	Production countrie(s)
4 Love	爱在小红点	M. Raihan Halim, Sam Loh, Gilbert Chan, Daniel Yam	Singapore
Ariel & Olivia		Kan Lume	Singapore
I'm Coming Up		Min-Wei Ting	Singapore
Siew Lup	烧腊	Sam Loh	Singapore
Shorts
Builders	Kattumaanar	Eysham Ali	Singapore
Dinosaur Rider		Tingerine Liu	Singapore
Durian-Picking		Kray Chen	Singapore
Eclipse		Jerrold Chong	Singapore
Mao Shan Wang		Khym Fong	Singapore

=== Asian Vision ===
English title	Original title	Director(s)	Production countrie(s)
Absent Without Leave	不即不离	Lau Kek-Huat	Taiwan, Malaysia
Ada Apa Dengan Cinta? 2		Riri Riza	Indonesia
Art Through Our Eyes		Joko Anwar, Ho Yuhang, Brillante Mendoza, Apichatpong Weerasethakul, Eric Khoo	Singapore, Malaysia, Indonesia, Thailand, Philippines
Bangkok Nites		Katsuya Tomita	Japan, France, Thailand, Laos
Big Big World	Koca Dünya	Reha Erdem	Turkey
Bitcoin Heist	Siêu Trộm	Ham Tran	Vietnam
The City of Mirrors: A Fictional Biography	Thành Phố Những Tấm Gương	Minh Quý Trương	Vietnam
Dearest Sister	ນ້ອງຮັກ	Mattie Do	Laos, France, Estonia
Diamond Island		Davy Chou	Cambodia, France, Germany, Thailand, Qatar
Don't Look at Me That Way	Schau mich nicht so an	Uisenma Borchu	Germany, Mongolia
A Dragon Arrives!	اژدها وارد می‌شود!	Mani Haghighi	Iran
Headshot		The Mo Brothers	Indonesia
Hema Hema		Khyentse Norbu	Bhutan
Hooly Bible II	神经2	Li Hongqi	China
Khun Pan		Kongkiat Komesiri	Thailand
Ma' Rosa		Brillante Mendoza	Philippines
The Mobfathers	选老顶	Herman Yau	Hong Kong
The Plague at the Karatas Village	Чума в ауле Каратас	Adilkhan Yerzhanov	Kazakhstan
Psycho Raman	Raman Raghav 2.0	Anurag Kashyap	India
Singing in Graveyards		Bradley Liew	Philippines, Malaysia
Voyage to Terengganu	Kisah Pelayaran ke Terengganu	Amir Muhammad, Badrul Hisham Ismail	Malaysia
Walking Street		Lee Sang-woo	South Korea
Wet Woman in the Wind	風に濡れた女	Akihiko Shiota	Japan
Wolf and Sheep		Shahrbanoo Sadat	Denmark, France, Afghanistan, Sweden
A Woman from Java	Nyai	Garin Nugroho	Indonesia
The Woman Who Left	Ang babaeng humayo	Lav Diaz	Philippines
Yamato (California)		Daisuke Miyazaki	Japan
Yourself and Yours	당신자신과 당신의 것	Hong Sang-soo	South Korea

=== Cinema Today ===
English title	Original title	Director(s)	Production countrie(s)
All These Sleepless Nights	Wszystkie nieprzespane noce	Michał Marczak	Poland, United Kingdom
All We Had		Katie Holmes	United States
Baden Baden		Rachel Lang	Belgium, France
Certain Women		Kelly Reichardt	United States
Dark Beast	Oscuro animal	Felipe Guerrero	Colombia, Argentina, Netherlands, Germany, Greece
The Darkness	Las tinieblas	Daniel Castro Zimbrón	Mexico, France
Eternity	Éternité	Tran Anh Hung	France, Belgium
Girl Asleep		Rosemary Myers	Australia
How to Build a Time Machine		Jay Cheel	Canada
I, Daniel Blake		Ken Loach	United Kingdom, France, Belgium
Illegitimate	Ilegitim	Adrian Sitaru	Romania, Poland, France
Kicks		Justin Tipping	United States
LoveTrue		Alma Har'el	United States
My Life as a Courgette	Ma vie de Courgette	Claude Barras	Switzerland, France
Notes on Blindness		Peter Middleton, James Spinney	United Kingdom
Still Life	Gorge coeur ventre	Maud Alpi	France
The Student	Uchenik	Kirill Serebrennikov	Russia
Suntan		Argyris Papadimitropoulos	Greece, Germany
The Teacher	Učiteľka	Jan Hřebejk	Slovakia, Czech Republic
Tickled		David Farrier, Dylan Reeve	New Zealand
Wild		Nicolette Krebitz	Germany
Withered Green	أخضر يابس	Mohammed Hammad	Egypt

=== Imagine ===
English title	Original title	Director(s)	Production countrie(s)
Dead Slow Ahead		Mauro Herce	France
Tales of Two Who Dreamt	Historias de dos que soñaron	Nicolás Pereda, Andrea Bussmann	Canada, Mexico
WINWIN		Daniel Hoesl	Austria

=== Classics ===
English title	Original title	Director(s)	Production countrie(s)
A Fugitive from the Past (1965)	飢餓海峡	Tomu Uchida	Japan
The Emerald Jungle (1934)	မြဂနိုင်	Tin Maung	Myanmar
Santi-Vina (1954)		Khru Marut	Thailand
Three Maidens (1956)	Tiga Dara	Usmar Ismail	Indonesia

=== Focus: Naomi Kawase ===
A special focus program presented the work of Japanese filmmaker, Naomi Kawase.

English title	Original title	Director(s)	Production countrie(s)
Suzaku (1997)	萌の朱雀	Naomi Kawase	Japan
Genpin (2003)		Naomi Kawase	Japan
The Mourning Forest (2007)	殯の森	Naomi Kawase	Japan, France
Still the Water (2014)	2つ目の窓	Naomi Kawase	Japan, France, Spain
Sweet Bean (2015)	あん	Naomi Kawase	Japan, France, Germany

=== Tribute: Fruit Chan ===
A special tribute program presented the work of Hong Kong filmmaker, Fruit Chan.

English title	Original title	Director(s)	Production countrie(s)
Little Cheung (1999)	細路祥	Fruit Chan	Hong Kong
Durian Durian (2000)	榴莲飘飘	Fruit Chan	Hong Kong
Dumplings (2004)	饺子	Fruit Chan	Hong Kong
The Midnight After (2014)	那夜凌晨，我坐上了旺角開往大埔的紅VAN	Fruit Chan	Hong Kong
My City (2015)		Fruit Chan	Hong Kong

== Awards ==
The following awards were presented at the festival:

=== Asian Film Feature Competition ===
- Best Film: White Sun by Deepak Rauniyar
  - Special Mention: Leftovers by Wicaksono Wisnu Legowo
- Best Director: Abdullah Mohammad Saad for Live from Dhaka
- Best Performance: Mostafa Monwar for Live from Dhaka

=== Southeast Asian Short Film Competition ===
- Best Southeast Asian Short Film: In the Year of Monkey by Wregas Bhanuteja
  - Special Mention: On the Origin of Fear by Bayu Prihantoro Filemon
- Best Singapore Short Film: Anchorage Prohibited by Chiang Wei Liang
- Best Director: Liao Jiekai for The Mist

=== Other awards ===
- Audience Choice Award: Absent Without Leave by Lau Kek-Huat
- Youth Jury Prize: Still by P. R. Patindol

=== Honorary Award ===
- Fruit Chan

=== Cinema Legend Award ===
- Simon Yam
