= Until Tomorrow =

Until Tomorrow may refer to:

- Until Tomorrow (TV series), Australian soap opera
- Until Tomorrow (2022 film), Iranian film
- See You (1999 film), also known as Until Tomorrow, Italian film
