= Divine Comedy (2025 film) =

2025 comedy-drama film

- International promotional poster
- Directed by: Ali Asgari
- Written by: Alireza Khatami; Bahman Ark; Ali Asgari
- Produced by: Ali Asgari; Milad Khosravi; Hasan Köroglu
- Starring: Bahman Ark; Sadaf Asgari
- Cinematography: Amin Jafari
- Edited by: Ehsan Vaseghi
- Music by: Hossein Mirzagholi
- Production companies: Seven Springs Pictures; Zoe Films; Salt for Sugar Films; Taat Films
- Release date: 2 September 2025 (Venice)
- Running time: 98 minutes
- Countries: Iran; Italy; France; Germany; Turkey
- Languages: Persian; Azerbaijani

Divine Comedy (Persian: کمدی الهی, romanized: Komedi-e elāhi) is a 2025 comedy-drama film co-written and directed by Ali Asgari. It stars Bahman Ark, Sadaf Asgari, Hossein Soleimani and Mohammad Soori. It follows Bahran, a 40-year-old filmmaker who never had his films officially screened in Iran, due to the country's harsh censorship.

A co-production between Iran, Italy, France, Germany and Turkey, the film had its world premiere at the Orizzonti section of the 82nd Venice International Film Festival.

== Cast ==
- Bahman Ark as Bahram
- Sadaf Asgari as Sadaf
- Hossein Soleimani
- Mohammad Soori
- Amirreza Ranjbaran

== Production ==
A satire of the Iranian censorship system and bureaucracy, the film was produced by Seven Springs Pictures and Taat Films, with Zoe Films, Salt for Sugar, Kadraj and Films Studio Zentral serving as co-producers. It marked the third consecutive collaboration between Asgari and producer Milad Khosravi, following Terrestrial Verses and the documentary Higher than Acidic Clouds.

== Release ==
The film had its world premiere at the 82nd Venice International Film Festival in the Orizzonti sidebar.

== Reception ==
The film was generally well received by critics. Screen International's film critic Wendy Ide praised the film, describing it as "cineliterate, meta-textual and wryly sarcastic, [...] a free-wheeling, sharp-witted satire that unpeels seemingly endless layers of Iranian cultural bureaucracy".

Marc van de Klashorst from International Cinephile Society referred to the film as a "subversive comedy that has Asgari transport Woody Allen to Tehran", and noted that "Its comedy may not always be divine, but Divine Comedy is a further showcase of Asgari's varied talent.".

Max Borg from Next Best Picture described the film as "a sharp, funny, and crowd-pleasing work". Ali Farahmand, the critic of The Brooklyn Rail, noted how "the influence of Swedish filmmaker Roy Andersson is unmistakable", and paired the film to Giuseppe Tornatore's Cinema Paradiso: "If the projectionist in Paradiso sought to give people their share of dreams, Bahram (or Ali Asgari), seeks to awaken them through his realist cinema: an awareness of the “comedy” of a lifeworld whose so-called “divine” order has been emptied of meaning".
