= A Bit of Light =

A Bit of Light may refer to:

- A Bit of Light (2022 film), English-language film directed by Stephen Moyer
- A Bit of Light (2026 film), Persian-language film directed by Ali Asgari
