= Taipei Film Festival =

Taiwanese cultural event

Taipei Film Festival 台北電影節
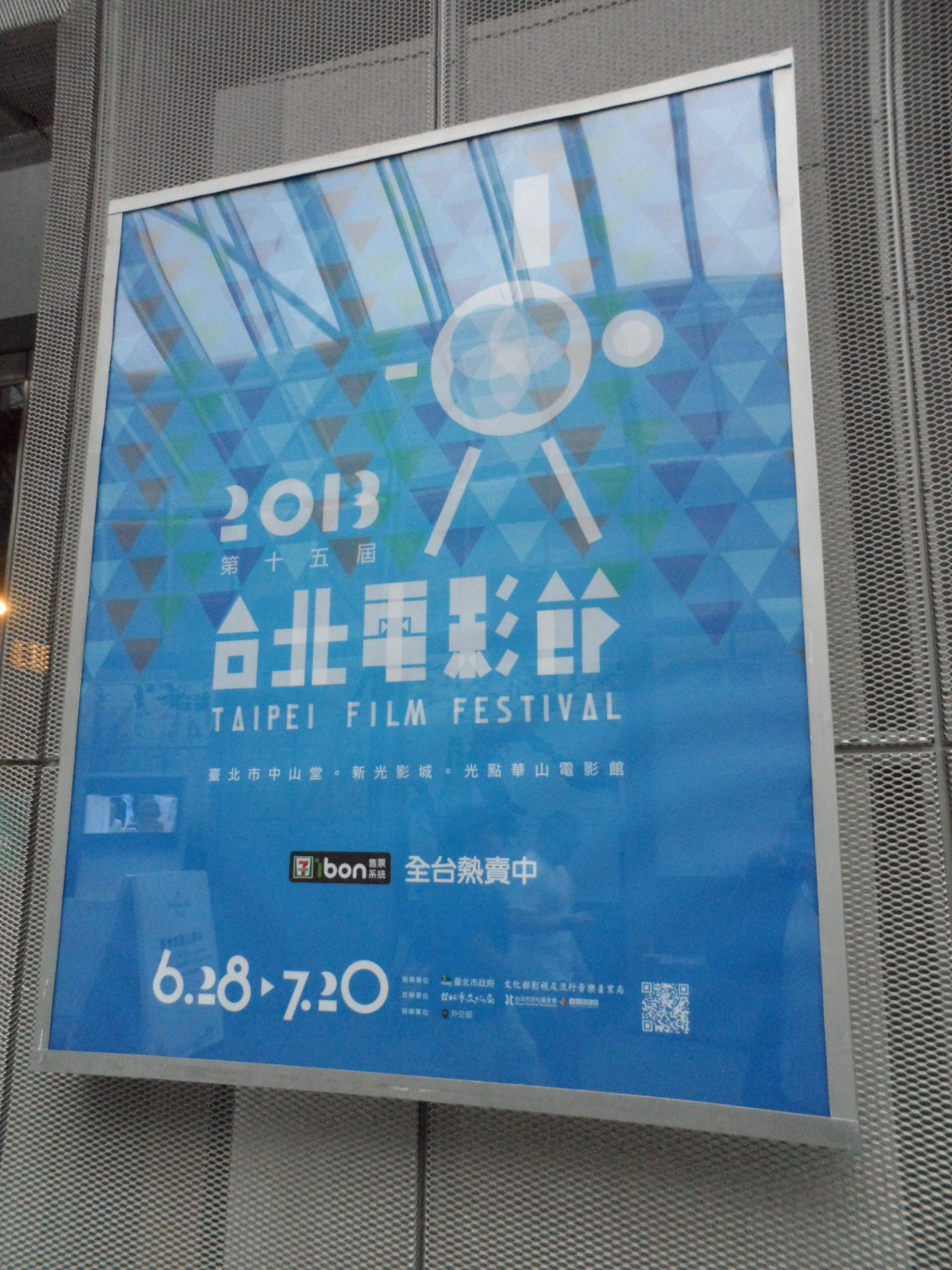
- Poster for the 2013 edition of the Taipei Film Festival
- Location: Taipei City, Taiwan
- Founded: 1998; 28 years ago
- Hosted by: Taipei's Cultural Affairs Department, Taipei Culture Foundation
- Language: International
- Website: www.taipeiff.taipei

The Taipei Film Festival (TFF; Chinese: 台北電影節; pinyin: Táiběi Diànyǐng Jié) is a film festival promoted by the city of Taipei, Taiwan, through the Department of Cultural Affairs of the Taipei City Government. It was first held in 1998, from September 28 to October 5. Currently chaired by cinematographer Mark Lee Ping Bin, Taipei Film Festival is the only festival in Taiwan that offers a New Talent Competition for aspiring directors from around the world and a Taipei Awards competition for Taiwanese filmmakers.

The Festival screens around 200 films from more than 30 countries worldwide. With approximately 100,000 attendants each year, Taipei Film Festival has become one of the most influential film festivals in the Chinese-speaking world.

== History ==
Due to the COVID-19 pandemic the 2020 Taipei Film Festival was the first in-person film festival to be held that year worldwide.

== Competition sections ==
- International New Talent Competition - Films in this section must be a director's first or second feature.
  - Grand Prize
  - Special Jury Prize
  - Audience’s Choice Award
- Taipei Film Awards - Competition for Taiwanese filmmakers.
  - Grand Prize
  - Best Narrative Feature
  - Best Documentary
  - Best Short Film
  - Best Animation
  - Best Director
  - Best Actor
  - Best Actress
  - Best Supporting Actor
  - Best Supporting Actress
  - Best New Talent
  - Best Screenplay
  - Best Music
  - Award for an Outstanding Artistic Contribution
  - Audience Choice Award
  - Outstanding Contribution Award

== International New Talent Competition ==
=== Grand Prize winners ===
Year	Film	Director	Nationality of director
2005	Harvest Time	Marina Razbezhkina	Russia
2006	Cold Showers	Antony Cordier	France
2007	Emma's Bliss	Sven Taddicken	Germany
2008	Le Ring	Anaïs Barbeau-Lavalette	Australia
2009	Disgrace	Steve Jacobs	Australia
2010	Kick Off	Shawkat Amin Korki	Iraq
2011	Familiar Grounds	Stéphane Lafleur	Canada
2012	Hanaan	Ruslan Pak	Uzbekistan
2013	Youth	Tom Shoval	Israel
2014	10 Minutes	Lee Yong-seung	South Korea
2015	The Kindergarten Teacher	Nadav Lapid	Israel
2016	Don't Look at Me That Way	Uisenma Borchu	Germany/Mongolia
2017	The Wound	John Trengove	South Africa
2018	The Nothing Factory	Pedro Pinho	Portugal
2019	System Crasher	Nora Fingscheidt	Germany
2020	This Is Not a Burial, It's a Resurrection	Lemohang Jeremiah Mosese	Lesotho
2021	Taste	Lê Bảo	Vietnam
2022	Softie	Samuel Theis	France
2023	Under the Fig Trees	Erige Sehiri	Tunisia
2024	Who Do I Belong To	Meryam Joobeur	Tunisia
2025	Drowning Dry	Laurynas Bareiša	Lithuania

== Taipei Film Awards ==
=== Grand Prize winners ===
Year	Film	Director	Genre
2002	Summers	Leon Dai	Short Film
2003	Stardust 15749001	Hou Chi-jan	Short Film
2003	Exit	Chen Lung-wei	Animation
2004	Farewell 1999	Wuna Wu	Documentary
2005	Let It Be	Yen Lan-chuan and Juang Yi-tzeng	Documentary
2006	Do Over	Cheng Yu-Chieh	Narrative Feature
2007	I Don't Want to Sleep Alone	Tsai Ming-liang	Narrative Feature
2008	Cape No. 7	Wei Te-sheng	Narrative Feature
2009	Cannot Live Without You	Leon Dai	Narrative Feature
2010	Let the Wind Carry Me	Kwan Pung-leung and Chiang Hsiu-chiung	Documentary
2011	Taivalu	Huang Hsin-yao	Documentary
2011	A Gift for Father's Day-The Tragedy of Hsiaolin Village Part 1	Luo Hsing-chieh	Documentary
2012	Hometown Boy	Yao Hung-I	Documentary
2013	A Rolling Stone	Shen Ko-shang	Documentary
2014	Unveil the Truth II：State Apparatus	Kevin H.J. Lee	Documentary
2015	Thanatos, Drunk	Chang Tso-chi	Narrative Feature
2016	Lokah Laqi	Laha Mebow	Narrative Feature
2017	The Great Buddha+	Huang Hsin-yao	Narrative Feature
2018	On Happiness Road	Sung Hsin-yin	Animation
2019	Last Year When the Train Passed by	Huang Pang-Chuan	Short Film
2020	Detention	John Hsu	Narrative Feature
2021	The Catch	Hsu Che-chia	Documentary
2022	A Holy Family	Elvis Lu	Documentary
2023	Diamond Marine World	Huang Hsiu-Yi	Documentary
2024	From Island to Island	Lau Kek-Huat	Documentary
2025	Island of the Winds	Hsu Ya-Ting	Documentary

== See also ==
Women Make Waves is a longer-established film festival, in Taiwan since 1993, and the largest women's film festival in Asia. Since 2005, there is also an annual Asian Lesbian Film and Video Festival in Taipei City, and since 2014, the annual Taiwan International Queer Film Festival in Taipei City and two other major cities, founded and directed by Jay Lin.

- Culture of Taiwan
- Golden Horse Film Festival and Awards
- Taiwan International Queer Film Festival
- Women Make Waves
