= Sadaf Asgari =

Iranian actress (born 1997)

- صدف عسگری
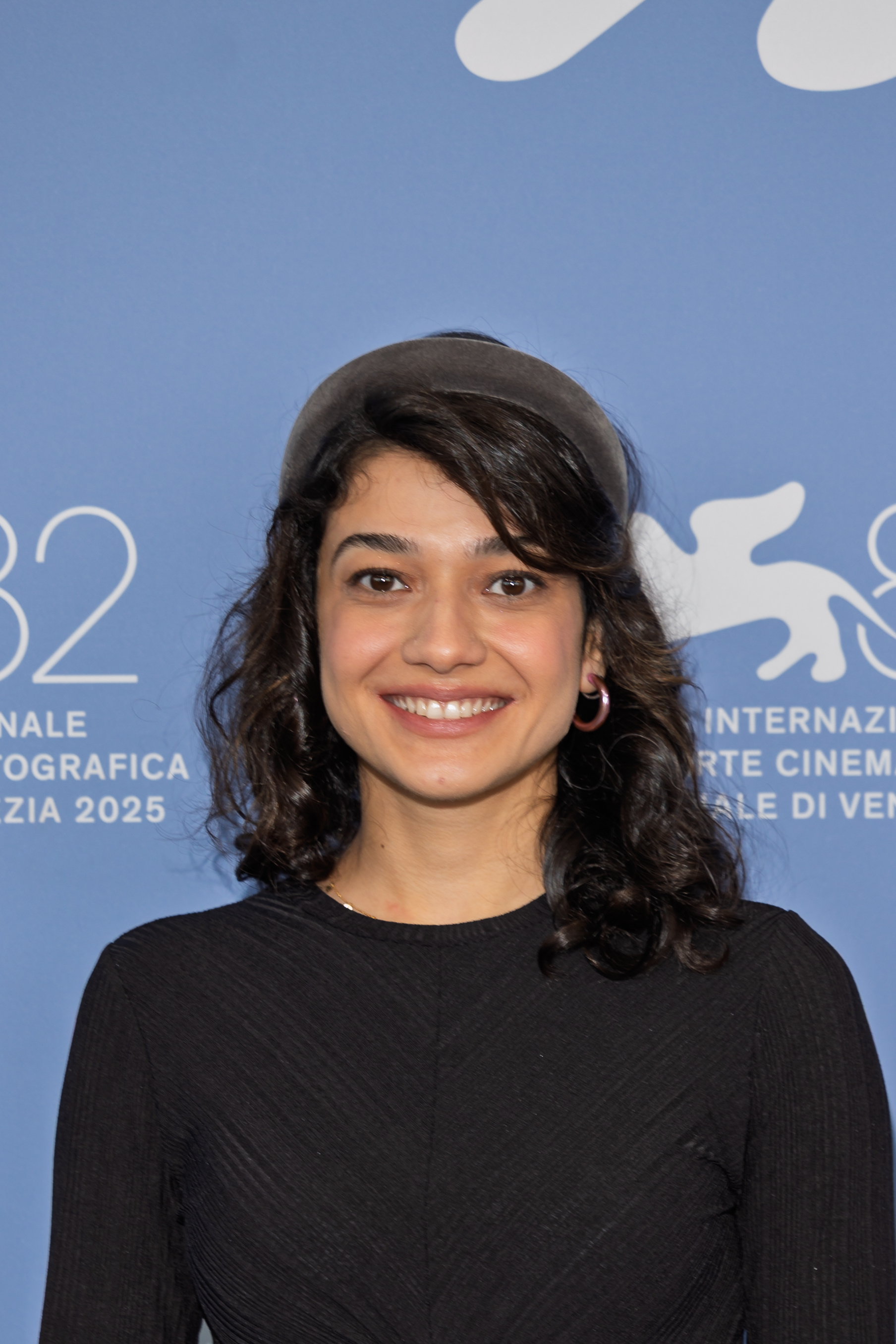
- Asgari at the 2025 Venice International Film Festival
- Born: November 21, 1997 (age 28); Tehran, Iran
- Occupation: Actress
- Years active: 2017–present
- Relatives: Ali Asgari (uncle)

Sadaf Asgari (Persian: صدف عسگری; born November 21, 1997) is an Iranian actress. She is best known for her acting in Disappearance (2017), Yalda, a Night for Forgiveness (2019) and Until Tomorrow (2022). She won the Short Film Special Jury Award for Acting at the 2020 Sundance Film Festival for her performance in Exam (2019).

== Early life ==
Sadaf Asgari was born on November 21, 1997, in Tehran, Iran.

== Filmography ==
=== Film ===
Year	Title	Role	Notes	Ref(s)
2017	Disappearance	Sara		
2018	Orange Days	Maryam		
2018	Delay		Short film	
2019	Yalda, a Night for Forgiveness	Maryam		
2019	Exam	Sadaf	Short film	
2020	Drowning in Holy Water	Rona		
2020	180° Rule	Yasi		
2021	No.3 Azar Shahr. Street			
2022	Squad of Girls	Azar		
2022	Until Tomorrow	Fereshteh		
2023	Terrestrial Verses	Sadaf		
2023	Empty Nets			
2023	Titanic, Suitable Version for Iranian Families		Short film	
2024	Invisible	Zaira	Short film	
2025	Divine Comedy			
2025	Between Dreams and Hope	Nora		
2025	Attitude		Short film	
2025	Born in Tehran		Short film	
2026	A Bit of Light			

== Awards and nominations ==
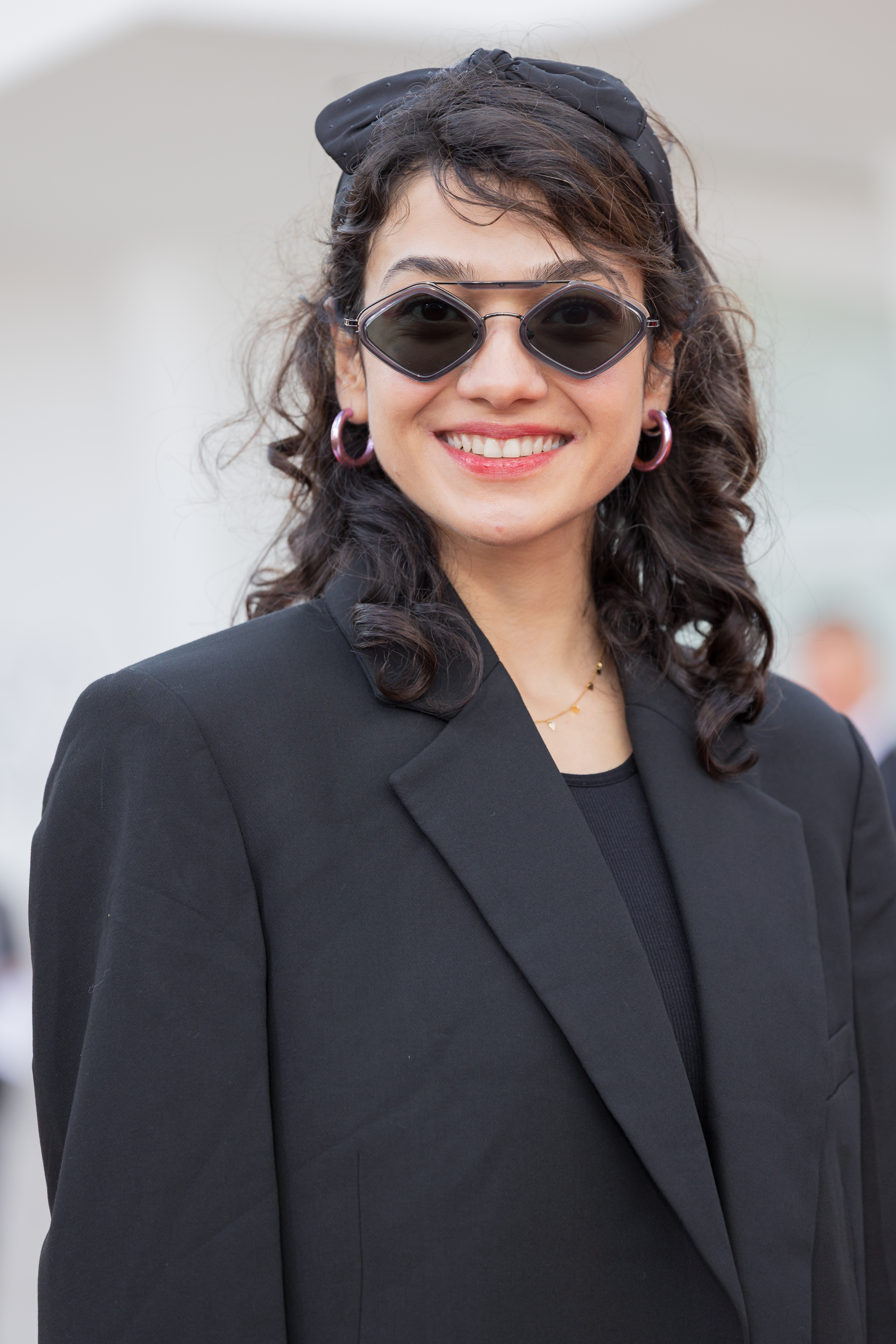
Asgari at the 2025 Venice International Film Festival

Name of the award ceremony, year presented, category, nominee of the award, and the result of the nomination
Year	Award	Category	Nominated Work	Result
2017	Fiumicino Film Festival	Best Actress	Disappearance	Won
2017	Singapore International Film Festival	Best Performance	Disappearance	Won
2020	Sundance Film Festival	Short Film Special Jury Award for Acting	Exam	Won
2020	Corti in Cortile	Best Actress	Exam	Won
2020	Valdarno Cinema Film Festival	Best Actress	Exam	Won
2021	Brussels Short Film Festival	Best Actress	Exam	Won
2021	Ouray International Film Festival	Best Actress	Exam	Won
2022	Iranian Film Festival Australia	Best Actress	Yalda, a Night for Forgiveness	Won

== See also ==
- Iranian women
- Iranian cinema
- Fajr International Film Festival
