= Singapore Dreaming =

2006 Singaporean film by Woo Yen Yen and Colin Goh

- Theatrical promotional poster
- Directed by: Woo Yen Yen; Colin Goh
- Written by: Woo Yen Yen; Colin Goh
- Produced by: Woo Yen Yen; Colin Goh; Woffles Wu
- Starring: Richard Low; Alice Lim; Serene Chen; Yeo Yann Yann; Lim Yu-Beng; Dick Su
- Cinematography: Martina Radwan
- Edited by: Rachel Kittner
- Music by: Sydney Tan
- Release date: 7 September 2006
- Running time: 105 minutes
- Country: Singapore
- Languages: English (Note: The Sunday Times published that the film is "mostly set in Singlish." However, Colin Goh, one of the writers, commented that this "was a very wrong characterisation. The script isn't deliberately in Singlish."); Hokkien; Mandarin
- Budget: S$800,000

Singapore Dreaming (Note: simplified Chinese: 美满人生; traditional Chinese: 美滿人生; pinyin: Měimǎn Rénshēng) is a 2006 Singaporean drama film. It follows the Loh family, a typical Singaporean working-class family, through their aspirations and dreams for a better and affluent life and the reality that would make it difficult for them to fulfill these aspirations.

The film is inspired by a 2000 Singaporean essay titled Paved with Good Intentions, that the writers of the film had written for the Singapore International Foundation. A concatenation of e-mails Singaporeans sent to writers Colin Goh and Woo Yen Yen on their life stories in relation to the Singaporean dream eventually led them to write, produce and direct Singapore Dreaming. The film stars Richard Low as Poh Huat, Alice Lim as Siew Luan, Serene Chen as Irene, Yeo Yann Yann as Mei, Lim Yu-Beng as CK and Dick Su as Seng.

The film was theatrically released on 7 September 2006, and at one time ranked fifth on the Singaporean box office. It has been acclaimed as one of the best Singaporean films of the 2000s. It won the Montblanc New Screenwriters Award at the 54th San Sebastián International Film Festival, and was the first such Singaporean film to receive an IFFPA-recognised international feature film award. Owing to its nature as a local film, Singapore Dreaming received much attention from Singaporean viewers, film critics and public figures alike, including S. R. Nathan, then President of Singapore. It has been praised by local critics as a relatable portrayal of working-class life in Singapore.

== Plot ==
Poh Huat, the father of the Loh family, works as a lawyer's clerk. He is married to Siew Luan, a housewife who likes to brew herbal tea for the family. Poh Huat has a habit of buying lottery tickets in hope of winning and enjoying a better life. He also keeps newspaper cuttings of car models and condominiums and stores them in a box in his room.

The family has one son, Seng, and one daughter, Mei. Despite Mei's superior academic performance, the family has consistently shown favouritism for Seng. Even though he was ostensibly the academically poorer sibling, dropping out of school in Secondary 3, his parents still chose to fund his overseas polytechnic education instead of furthering his sister's education. Seng is due to return after two years at Dubois Polytechnical University (at Idaho). To fund his overseas studies, he had to borrow extra money from his fiancée, Irene, who stays with Seng's parents.

Mei works as a secretary who maintains a friendly working relationship with her boss. She is due for delivery in two months' time, and for maternity leave in a month's time. Her husband, Chin Keong, quit his job in the Singapore Armed Forces a month before and is now selling insurance, though unsuccessfully. He is therefore belittled by Mei. Even though they cannot afford it, they frequently go to a condominium showroom to take a look, revealing their aspirations for a more luxurious lifestyle.

Seng returns from the United States. Tensions escalate in the family between Mei and Seng, due to the family's apparent favouritism for Seng. Seng goes for several job interviews, but is unsuccessful. He becomes immensely disappointed, and lies to his family about the sanguinity of his job prospects.

Poh Huat strikes the Toto lottery, winning S$2 million, and the family is ecstatic. Seng decides that he wants to try starting a business. He gains his father's approval, who gives him effectively unlimited funding through a credit card. Seng also buys a car, without Irene's knowledge. Irene is infuriated when she learns Seng has been overspending without working first.

Initially thrilled by his sudden elevation to the higher social class, Poh Huat dies suddenly of a heart attack while he was at a country club for a membership interview. Siew Luan goes into shock. At the funeral, Seng quarrels with Mei over the funeral expenses. Mei vents her anger on Chin Keong, who shows his displeasure by throwing the carton of drinks on the floor and storming off. Mei is called back to work one afternoon, even though she is still managing the funeral. Chin Keong expresses his outrage at this unreasonable request, but Mei says out of frustration, "Singapore is like that, everywhere is like that, do we have a choice?" and returns to work. At work, Mei's boss, frustrated at the incapable temporary secretary, vents his anger at Mei and demands her to photocopy a stack of documents and brew coffee for him. Mei flips at the triviality of the task.

Back at the funeral, Mei realizes that S$500 has gone missing from the pek kim, (Note: Pek kim: Condolence money given at a funeral) and wrongly accuses her Filipino maid, Pinky, of stealing the money. Chin Keong reveals shortly after that the money is actually with him. Pinky, indignant at the wrong accusation, spits at Mei. Chin Keong goes to a nearby coffee shop for a drink. A beer girl from China approaches him at his table to talk to him, and Chin Keong ends up confiding his worries about life. The girl notes, "You Singaporeans are always complaining. Do you think your life is tough?". During the funeral wake, Seng reveals to his family that he did not graduate. Initially unbeknownst to him, Irene is standing nearby at the door, and hears his confession. Irene is greatly disappointed with Seng, and resolves to leave him.

A few months later, Chin Keong, Seng and Mei, with her newly-born son, are called to a lawyer's office. It is revealed that Poh Huat's will has been found (made before either of them are born): he had left all his assets to his wife Siew Luan. However, the family has chalked up a debt of S$800,000 in sending Seng overseas. Siew Luan is absent from the meeting, so the lawyer announces that, of the remaining S$1, 200,000, Mei is getting S$300,000, while Seng is getting S$1,000. At the movie's end, Siew Luan hands some money over to Poh Huat's mistress and illegitimate son in a show of benevolence, and leaves Seng. Irene decides to go abroad to pursue a degree in photography.

== Cast ==
A team of local actors composed the cast for Singapore Dreaming. Some casting decisions were made when the producers were penning the script in New York while others were made in Singapore.

The characters of the film were based on the experiences of the people around the writers, that of the writers themselves, and on the e-mail responses that they received to their essay.

- Richard Low as Poh Huat: MediaCorp actor Richard Low had a role in one of the MediaCorp productions that was filming during the time Singapore Dreaming was set to film. However, he was not engaged as his character in that production was in coma. In the film, Poh Huat is the patriarch of the Loh family. He persistently favours and sides with his son, Seng over his daughter, Mei. Like the rest of the family, he yearns for a better life and, in particular, for a car and a country club membership.
- Alice Lim as Siew Luan: Alice Lim was one of the actresses that were cast later. She is the first female MC for major events in Singapore, and used to be active in the 1970s. The directors admired her 'beautiful' delivery of Hokkien in the film. In the film, Siew Luan married Poh Huat when she was young and remained a housewife ever since. She is seen to brew bottles of herbal tea perpetually (for members of the family, who, except for Irene, tend to reject them). She shares part of her life story with the audience as the film concludes.
- Serene Chen as Irene: The producers had a good relationship with Serene Chen from their previous work together on an earlier production, 3Meals. They planned to cast Serene Chen early on, during the initial script-writing. In the film, Serene plays the live-in fiancée of Seng, Irene. Irene is deeply attached to Seng and hankers for a marriage with him in the beginning of the film. She, together with Poh Huat, funded his overseas studies. Irene is also very close to Siew Luan.
- Yeo Yann Yann as Mei: Although the producers were unacquainted with Yann Yann, they used her face as a reference when writing for the character, Mei. Back in Singapore, Yann Yann accepted their offer to cast as Mei. In the film, Mei is the underappreciated daughter of the family, married to CK, whom she occasionally henpecks. Indignant that Seng was sent overseas when she was the one whose academic performance was more distinguished, she bears a patent grudge against Seng.
- Lim Yu-Beng as CK: The part of CK was written for Lim Yu-Beng, who agreed to join the film's production. In the film, CK resigned as an army officer and turned to selling insurance, a career at which he does not appear to be successful.
- Dick Su as Seng: Dick Su was involved in the production only after Serene Chen brought him in. In the film, Seng is the son in the family, who failed in graduating from his overseas studies. There were times when he tries to convince his family, especially his father, that he can succeed in life. Unfortunately, his plans never seem to work out and he ends up disappointing the people around him.

== Development ==
=== Conception ===
The development of Singapore Dreaming began in 2000 when New York-based couple Colin Goh and Woo Yen Yen wrote an essay for Singaporeans Exposed, a publication to commemorate the Singapore International Foundation's ten-year anniversary. The 5200-word essay, Paved with Good Intentions, explained the difference between the Singapore Dream and the Singapore Plan, and discussed the source and fashion of many Singaporeans' aspirations. Paved with Good Intentions was later circulated round the Internet, where many Singaporeans read the essay.

Confessional responses the couple received thereafter reached the hundreds. In a podcast with mrbrown, Woo explained the typical reader response was "How is it that I now have a house, I now have a car, a job, why I am still unhappy?" The couple "felt a responsibility to do something", which inspired them to write the film, the original working title of which was The 5Cs.

=== Production ===
The film was a number of firsts in the film industry; Singapore Dreaming was the first Singaporean film to be digitally encoded and projected. It was also the first collaboration between Singaporean and New York film-makers; the Director of photography Martina Radwan, editor Rachel Kittner and sound designer Paul Hsu were based in New York, along with the production staff, while composer Sydney Tan was based in Singapore.

Singapore Dreaming was an independent, low-budget production, costing only S$800 000 in total to produce — 80% of which was raised by Executive Producer Woffles Wu. The film was Woffles Wu's first production, and the Colin Goh–Woo Yen Yen team's second. The rigors of production forced Producer Woo Yen Yen to take a no-pay leave from her job as an assistant professor.

Filming began in August 2005, with the scenes in the house shot in an actual 3-room HDB flat in a bid for authenticity. This led to situations in which the cast and crew had to squeeze into the rooms in the small flat for hours on end. The team also had to endure heat and stuffy conditions, especially during the scene in which the family shared steamboat in the living room.

In an attempt at authenticity and realism, the producers allowed the characters speak in a mix of Hokkien, English and Mandarin, in the typical Singaporean manner. The film would later be subtitled in English and Mandarin during post-production so that the audience would be able to understand the characters' lexicon without knowing how the average Singaporean speaks.

Unlike in larger productions, the team of directors had to assume numerous roles during the independent production, some of which included the transportation of furniture and buying drinking water for the crew during the shoot. Colin Goh and Steven Chin, the assistant director, also had to take the unusual step of staging a fight to distract curious passers-by and prevent them from gathering round when they were shooting a certain scene. After the filming was complete, the movie was digitally encoded in New York and digitally projected at a number of select cinemas.

== Publicity and release ==
=== Premieres ===
Before being commercially released, Singapore Dreaming was screened at two charity premieres. The first, on 12 April 2006 at Lido, was a pre-opener to the Singapore International Film Festival. Tickets were sold at $15 and all proceeds went to the Festival. The tickets were sold out by 6.00 pm on the day they were released. Among the guests were public figures including president Sellapan Ramanathan and wife, Foreign Minister George Yeo and Opposition Member of Parliament Chiam See Tong. Directors like Jack Neo and Eric Khoo also attended this premiere. A total of about 700 people attended the event.

The second charity premiere was on 30 August 2006, and the beneficiary was the Association of Women for Action and Research. The producers organized a Teachers' Day Giveaway, allowing students to nominate teachers for a free screening. In total, 100 pairs of tickets were given away this way. The audience filled up all five cinema halls at GV Grand at Great World City. Like the first premiere, the event was sold-out.

=== Commercial release ===
Sneak previews began on 1 September 2006 while the film was commercially released on 7 September 2006. The film opened on a total of eighteen screens islandwide, which encompasses all GV and Cathay screens and selected Shaw and Eng Wah screens.

The producers were initially concerned about the small independent film lasting in the cinemas with the influx of American blockbusters. Thus, the producers continually urged on the film's blog for those interested to watch the film as early as possible, in case of a short theatrical run. However, the film's theatrical run was to continue for eight weeks; it outlasted all other films that opened in the same week. After a hiatus of a few weeks, the film reopened transiently at GV VivoCity.

In October 2007, the film was screened at the Freer Gallery of Art of the Smithsonian, Washington, DC, as part of the ASEAN Film Festival.

=== Advertising ===
The directors, with their limited funds, put print advertisements in local newspapers to advertise the film. The last print advertisement appeared in local newspapers on 16 September 2006, the tenth day after the release of the film.

Due to the small advertising budget, however, a large part of the film's advertising took place through the Internet. For instance, the film's directors spoke directly to the viewers through their blog to advertise the film through word-of-mouth. In particular, they instructed viewers to tell at least ten friends about the film. The producers also appeared on 6 September 2006 release of the mrbrown show and, in a 31-minute podcast, shared with the audience the production of the film.

As further publicity for the film, Colin Goh uploaded three trailers of the film onto YouTube to raise awareness and interest about the movie. By 15 August 2006, the trailers had 7000 views in total, and one of them had 4000 views. The producers also advertised the film through TalkingCock, a satirical website that they own, by posting articles and updates on the film's development.

== Reception ==
=== Awards ===
Singapore Dreaming competed for two awards in the Zalbaltegi section of the San Sebastián International Film Festival, the first being the Moutblanc New Screenwriter's Award (the third ever awarded in the annual festival), and the second being the Altadis-New Directors Award. This film lost the latter award to Fair Play, but bagged the Moutblanc New Screenwriter's Award. There were eighteen films in competition for the screenwriter's award. The directors did not submit the films directly to San Sebastian at first. Instead, they sent preview screeners to solicit comments on the film from their friends in New York. The film was spread around resulting in it being nominated for the film festival.

The feature film is the first Singaporean film to be in competition for the two awards at the IFFPA-recognized (Note: IFFPA: International Federation of Film Producers Associations.) San Sebastian International Film Festival. Moreover, while other Singaporean films (like those directed by Eric Khoo and Royston Tan) have won awards at other international film festivals before, those are either not recognized by IFFPA, or are categorized by them as "specialized". The "specialized" tag means that, as The Straits Times explains, "they focus on a particular aspect of film or film-making". The film thus has the added honour of being the first Singaporean film to receive an award at an IFFPA-recognised international feature film festival.

On 28 October 2007, Singapore Dreaming snagged the Best Asian/Middle-Eastern Film Award at the 20th Tokyo International Film Festival, and is the first Singapore feature to win this award.

=== Box office and rankings ===
As of 2 October 2006, three and a half weeks after its local commercial release, Singapore Dreaming grossed S$420 000 from the local box office. The producers claim the film to be the highest grossing Singapore film produced in the past eight years not produced by MediaCorp or MediaCorp Raintree Pictures. The film was the fifth at the local box office for the week the film opened. In its second week, the film dropped to the sixth position, and in its third week, to the eighth position. From the fourth week onwards to the end of the film's theatrical run, it ceased to appear in Singapore's top ten charts.

=== Critical reception ===
The film was praised by critics for its technical craftsmanship and strong relatability, with many highlighting its engaging storytelling. Neil Humphreys, in a Today feature of Singapore Dreaming, pointed out that it is untainted by crass sexual themes, unlike 12 Storeys, which featured similar characters. Humphreys wrote, "the characters are immediately identifiable, particularly the women. And depicting such social reality on screen underscores Goh and Woo's bravery." Lin Wenqi, reviewing the film for a Taiwan Film Institute periodical, also found the film to be a captivating and relatable portrayal of Singapore society. According to Lin, unlike the excessively preachy Singaporean film I Not Stupid, Singapore Dreaming was impressive in its ability to weave life lessons into the plot and cinematography. Singaporean critic Vinita Ramani praised the acting, and agreed that many Singaporeans found the film relatable. However, Ramani wrote that the film "falls short of expectations" because it featured platitudes regarding the unsuccessful pursuit of material wealth by unfulfilled HDB heartlanders, a theme already "milked to death" in Singaporean films such as 12 Storeys. The Spanish critic Jonathan Holland, writing for Variety, called the first half of the film "over-stretched, noisy comedy", preferring the portrayal of the funeral proceedings in the second half for its "pleasing lightness of touch" and lyrical music.

== Soundtrack ==
The Singapore Dreaming soundtrack was released by BooBao Records in June 2006. It comprises various songs and tunes that were featured in the movie, most of which were composed by the music director for the film, Sydney Tan. Stephen Hough is also listed as one of the soundtrack's composers. The soundtrack album, containing both emotive and entertaining pieces, shows a variation in the mood of the songs.

Of particular prominence in the soundtrack is the 1933 Taiwanese song Bāng Chhun-hong. Lin Wenqi points out that the song's last phrase, "I was fooled, for it was just the wind", paralleled the characters Poh Huat and Seng's fruitless pursuit of material wealth. As the producers were writing the script in New York, Woo Yen Yen called her mother in Singapore to ask her about the most popular song of her time. Her mother's first suggestion was Bāng Chhun-hong, a song which the producers came to like. The song was later adopted as the opening theme, and the character Siew Luan would hum it again as the film concludes, this time more wistfully as she would recount the days when she was young. Four major and three minor variations of the song were included in the soundtrack. As Moviexclusive describes Sydney Tan's score, "the […] use of pianos and strings is complemented by the occasional wistful accompaniments of the traditional erhu, adding the essential 'Asian touch' to the music." According to Woo, during auditions for the film, several young actors wept upon hearing the song, which reminded them of their youth and parents.

The film's soundtrack also includes two songs by the local band Ronin, "Black Maria" and "Memories". It also includes "Mei Man Ren Sheng", a song that shares its title with the film. The tune was rearranged by Sydney Tan and performed by Nicole Lai, with lyrics in Chinese by Ng King Kang. The film's producer, Woffles Wu, did the backing vocals for the recording.
