= Sven Zellner =

German photographer, cinematographer and documentary filmmaker

Sven Zeller
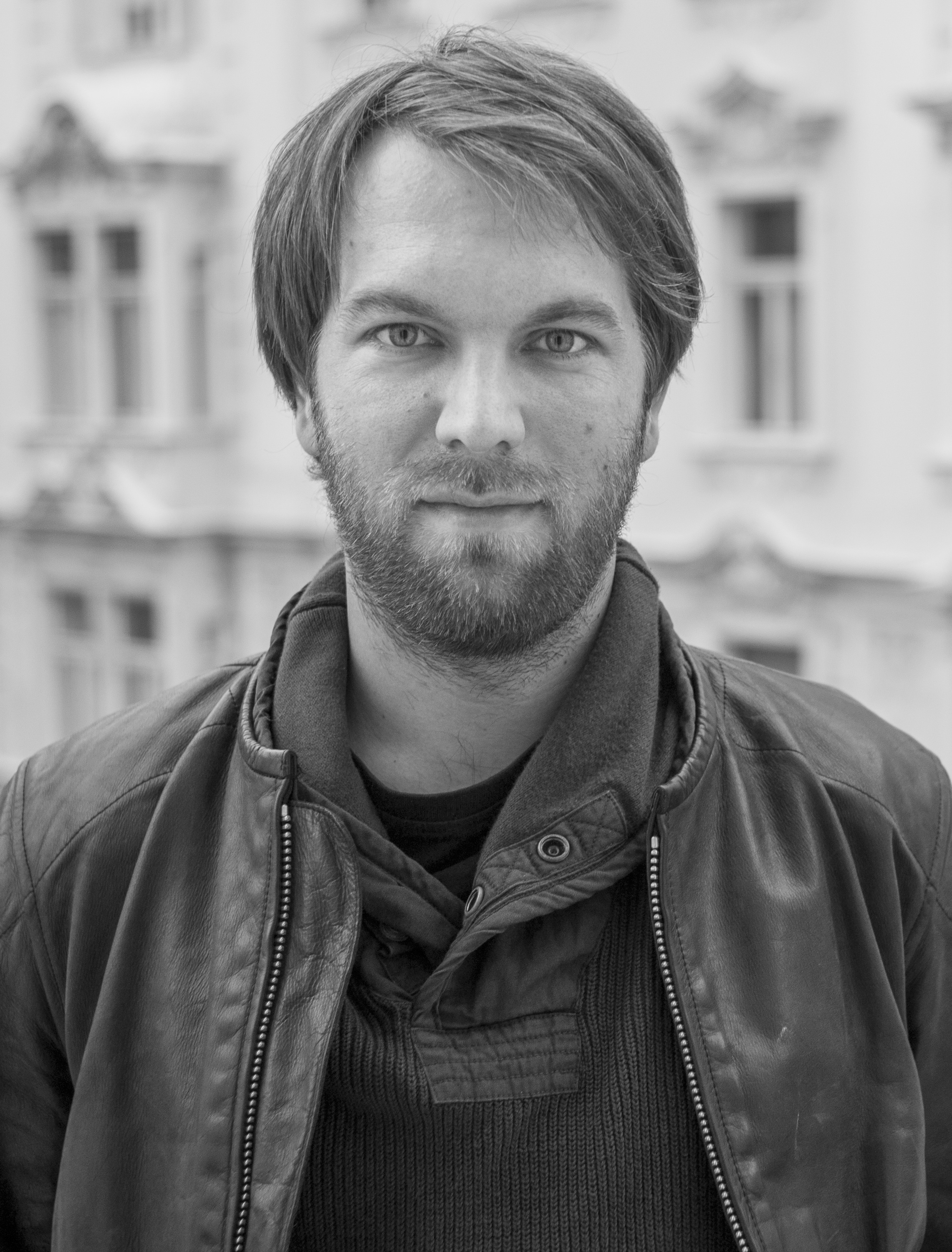
- Born: December 20, 1977 (age 48)
- Education: University of Television and Film Munich
- Occupations: Photographer; cinematographer; Documentary filmmaker
- Awards: Selection of awards
- Website: Official website

Sven Zellner (born December 20, 1977) is a German photographer, camera operator and documentary filmmaker.

== Life ==
Zellner was born on December 20, 1977, in Eckernförde, Schleswig-Holstein, Germany.

From October 2002 to February 2010, he studied camera in the cinema and television film department at the University of Television and Film Munich. He has been a lecturer there since 2009.

== Filmography (selection) ==
- 2010: Die Bumblebee (camera)
- 2012: Preis des Goldes (documentary film: director, camera, editor)
- 2015: Don't Look at Me That Way (cinematography)
- 2020: Walchensee Forever (documentary: cinematography)
- 2020: Black Milk (cinematography, production)

== Awards (selection) ==
- 1995: Second prize at the „BBC Young Wildlife Photographer of the Year“
- 2000: Second prize in the category Landschaft at the „BG Wildlife Photographer of the Year“
- 2009: Third prize for Tsogzol – Goldgräber in der Mongolei (later Preis des Goldes) at the Filmfest München at the Dokumentarfilmwettbewerb by Bayerischer Rundfunk and Telepool
- 2012: ARTE-Dokumentarfilmpreis for his film Preis des Goldes
- 2013: Second prize for Wounded Places at the Filmfest München at the Dokumentarfilmwettbewerb by Bayerischer Rundfunk and Global Screen
- 2015: Honorable Mention of the Manuel Rivera-Ortiz Foundation for Documentary Photography and Film

== Exhibitions ==
- 2012 „NINJAS“ Hochschule für Fernsehen und Film München
- 2013 „NINJAS“ Deutsche Botschaft in Ulaanbaatar
- 2014 „Mongolian Disco“ Leica Fotografie International Galerie, Hamburg
- 2014 „Mongolian Disco“, Radialsystem V (Crossing Identities – Beginners, Experts, Hybrids Urban Nomads // Mongol Citizens // Festival Berlin 2014)
- 2015 „Mongolian Disco“, German House, UN Plaza, New York (DAAD-Ausstellung: WESTALGIA: NOSTALGIA FOR THE WEST)

== Publications ==
- Süddeutsche Zeitung Nr. 133 „Es darf wehtun“ Samstag/Sonntag 11./12. June 2016
- GEO „Zukunft auf Eis“ February 2016
- Delayed Gratification „slowing pains“ January 2016
- Das Magazin „Mongole mit Kohle“ No 10 (August 3–March 14, 2014) (weekly supplement from Tagesanzeiger, Basler Zeitung, Berner Zeitung and the federal government).
- GEO International „Ulan-Bator“ May 2014
- Leica Fotografie International „Mongolen Disko“ February 2014
- Terra Mater „Goldrausch im Wilden Osten“ December 2012
- VIEW „Knallharte Träumer“ April 2014
- Nikon Pro „Risking life and limb“ April 2015
