= Nicole Lai =

Malaysian musician

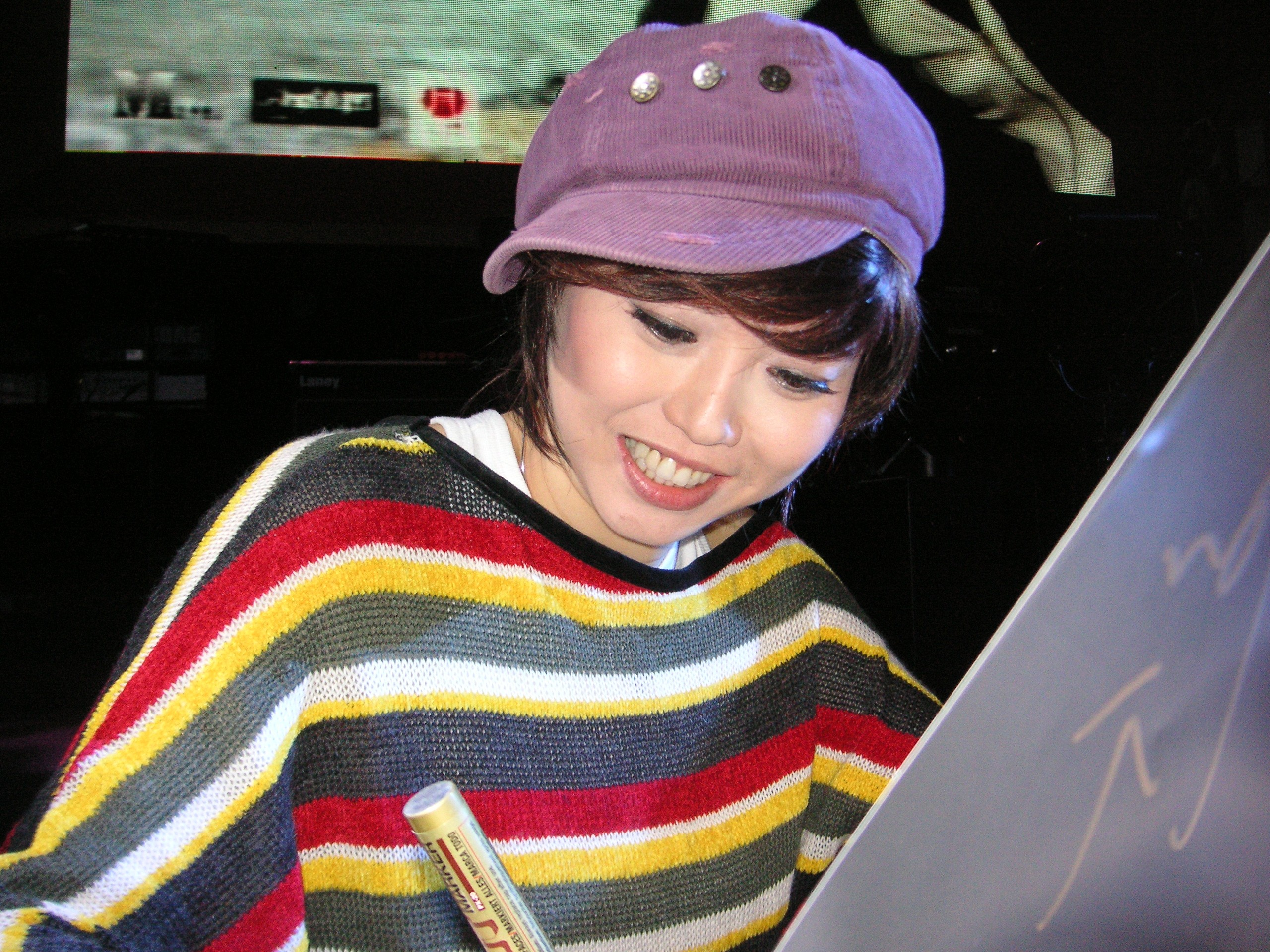
- Born: Lai Pei Yee; 26 February 1974; Penang, Malaysia
- Died: 6 September 2008 (aged 34); Singapore
- Burial place: Christian Columbarium, The Garden of Remembrance, 920 Old Choa Chu Kang Road, Singapore 699815; Niche: 4y02(6)219
- Occupations: Singer-songwriter, Backing vocalist, Vocal Trainer, Performer, Record Producer
- Children: Carmen Ang (Daughter)
- Awards: Xinyao 2003 Competition: Champion – Vocal Performance Category 梦想家; 1st runner-up – Composing Category 梦想家
- Musical career
- Also known as: Niguolai (你过来)
- Origin: Malaysia
- Genre: Mandopop
- Instruments: Piano, Drums, Guitar

Nicole Lai (黎珈仪, 26 February 1974 in Penang – 6 September 2008) was a Singapore-based Malaysian Chinese singer-songwriter, backing vocalist, vocal trainer and performer. Her nickname Niguolai (你过来) was given to her by her good friend and singer-songwriter, Stefanie Sun. This nickname simply means "You! Come over here!" in English.

== Biography ==
=== Professional qualification and training ===
Nicole had London College of Music Grade 8 (Distinction) qualification and also had undergone modelling training at Mannequin Studio and had received a diploma from Plato Make-Up Academy. Nicole studied vocals in Los Angeles under Jodi Sellards, who has taught David Tao, A-mei (Zhang Hui Mei) and Alex To (Du De Wei).

=== Vocal instructor, backing vocalist ===
Nicole has worked with many famous celebrities including Aaron Kwok, Jolin Tsai, Gigi Leung, Sammi Cheng, Jeff Chang, Karen Mok, Na Ying and Stefanie Sun. She has done backup vocals for albums by: Stefanie Sun, Gigi Leung, Sammi Cheng, Aaron Kwok, Jolin Tsai, and also has done live backup vocals for Julia Peng and Eric Moo. Nicole was one of the most experienced instructors in Singapore. Beside being a freelance instructor, she also taught at Lee Wei Song School of Music (李偉菘) and Ocean Butterflies (海蝶音樂). She has taught many famous celebrities, including Stefanie Sun, Niki Wu, Huang Yida, Xiao Su Shen. She was also the vocal coach of MediaCorp Artistes including Zoe Tay, Tay Ping Hui, Christopher Lee and Constance Song.

=== Awards, judges ===
Nicole was a member of the Composers and Authors Society of Singapore (COMPASS). In 2003, she won awards for her own composition "梦想家" ("Dreamer") in the Xinyao Song competition held in Singapore where she was champion in the Vocal Performance Category and 1st runner up in the Composing Category. This song was later featured in the Taiwanese TV series Green Forest, My Home soundtrack album. Nicole also sang on the soundtrack of Singapore's own home-grown movie, Singapore Dreaming "Mei Man Ren Sheng". Nicole also made appearances on television as one of the judges for MediaCorp TV Channel 8's weekend variety show, PSC Nite 2005 and MediaCorp TV Channel U's 2008 S-POP HURRAY song writing competition show.

=== Commercial performer, charity work ===
Nicole was also an avid performer herself, having performed at countless Dinner and Dance events, Family Days, Singapore Town Council events and many other occasions. She has done many jingles including those of Hazeline Snow, Singapore Airlines, McDonald's, Canon, Slimwater and Knife Oil. Under the World Vision Organization child sponsorship programme, Nicole sponsored four kids when she was alive. After her death, her friends launched her EP album at the end of 2008 and proceeds from the CD sales will go to charity and to adopting Nicole's four kids from World Vision.

== Discography ==
=== Songwriter ===
Nicole was also a songwriting enthusiast, and recently had one of her songs published in Stefanie Sun's album. Nicole was also a member of the Composers and Authors Society of Singapore (COMPASS), and had songs published in Stefanie Sun's, Maggie Tang's, Vivian Hsu's, Linda and Taiwanese TV series Green Forest, My Home soundtrack album. Nicole's own composition of "梦想家" title was renamed to "一個人的星光" ("One's Star Light") and sung by William So.

Song	Performer	Description
亲爱的	Vivian Hsu	Co-written with Low Shao Suan
反过来走走	Stefanie Sun	
好久不见	Maggie Tang	
祝我好运	Maggie Tang	
一个人的星光 (梦想家)	William So, Xu Jing Lan	Taiwan TV series – Green Forest, My Home
Another Me	Linda	Taiwan
你我的自由 – Freedom	Nicole Lai	Co-written with Ruth Ling

=== Albums ===
Before her death, she wrote the song "你我的自由 – Freedom" which carries a special messages from her – "Freedom is a choice in life. We are all free to make our choices in life, and even if we decide not to make any choice, that in itself is our freedom to choose" ~~With Love...nL.

Many local singer-songwriters attended her CD launch at Lunar on 23 April 2008. They include Lee Wei Song, Lee Shih Shiong, Jim Lim, Kenn C., Wu JiaMing, Ruth Ling, both Peng ChiSheng and Aaron Lim of Intune Music School, Radio DJ Luo Bang Qiang and many of her vocal students too. The CD was sponsored by Stefanie Sun and was given to friends during her wake. Another remembrance EP album is released in September 2009.

English title	Chinese title	Producer	Arranger	Launch date	Description
Freedom	你我的自由	Jim Lim	Kenn C	(1) 23 April 2008, (2) 6th to 10th Sept 2008 at her wake	1st launch at Lunar, and 2nd launch sponsored by Stefanie Sun.

=== Record producer ===
One of Singapore largest entertainment complex, St James Power Station decided to produce an EP album for their Dragonfly Performers in August 2007. Nicole was consulted for this project. In her own premise at Tiong Bahru, she personally trained the performers to ensure everybody is studio ready. The EP album was released by Sony BMG in October 2007. The song that Nicole produced was one of the best track audience selected.
