= Gasoline Rainbow =

- Theatrical release poster
- Directed by: Bill Ross IV; Turner Ross
- Written by: Bill Ross IV; Turner Ross
- Produced by: Matthew Sargeant; Michael Gottwald; Carlos Zozaya; Lauren Cargo; Jesy Rae Buhl
- Starring: Tony Abuerto; Micah Bunch; Nichole Dukes; Nathaly Garcia; Makai Garza
- Cinematography: Bill Ross IV; Turner Ross
- Edited by: Bill Ross IV; Turner Ross
- Music by: Casey McAllister
- Production companies: Department of Motion Pictures; Mubi; XTR
- Distributed by: Mubi
- Release dates: September 7, 2023 (Venice); May 10, 2024 (United States)
- Running time: 110 minutes
- Country: United States
- Language: English
- Box office: $29,068

Gasoline Rainbow is a 2023 American independent drama film written, directed, shot, and edited by the Ross brothers. It stars Tony Abuerto, Micah Bunch, Nichole Dukes, Nathaly Garcia and Makai Garza.

Gasoline Rainbow had its world premiere at the 80th Venice International Film Festival on September 7, 2023. The film was released in select cinemas on May 10, 2024, before streaming on Mubi on May 31, 2024.

== Plot ==
Five Gen Z teenagers, after the end of their school years, embark on one last adventure to the Pacific Coast, making memories and meeting new people along the way.

== Cast ==
- Tony Abuerto
- Micah Bunch
- Nichole Dukes
- Nathaly Garcia
- Makai Garza

== Production ==
Production took place in late 2021.

== Release ==
The film had its world premiere at the 80th Venice International Film Festival in the Orizzonti section. Prior to that, Mubi, who produced and financed the film, acquired distribution rights to the film. The film was also screened at South by Southwest and the First Look Festival at the Museum of the Moving Image in March 2024.

Gasoline Rainbow had a limited theatrical release in the United States on May 10, 2024, followed by a streaming release on Mubi three weeks later on May 31, 2024.

== Reception ==
=== Critical response ===
On the review aggregator website Rotten Tomatoes, 93% of 44 critics' reviews are positive, with an average rating of 7.8/10. The website's consensus reads: "Gasoline Rainbow takes an honest look at adolescence and - befitting its title - finds arresting beauty in incongruous and unexpected places." Metacritic, which uses a weighted average, assigned the film a score of 80 out of 100, based on 20 critics, indicating "generally favorable" reviews.

=== Accolades ===
The film won the Audience Award at 2024 Luxembourg City Film Festival.
