= Until Tomorrow (2022 film) =

2022 Iranian drama film

- Film poster
- Directed by: Ali Asgari
- Written by: Ali Asgari; Alireza Khatami
- Starring: Sadaf Asgari
- Cinematography: Ashkan Ashkani
- Edited by: Ehsan Vaseghi
- Release date: 12 February 2022 (BIFF)
- Running time: 86 minutes
- Countries: Iran; France; Qatar
- Language: Persian

Until Tomorrow (Persian: تا فردا, Ta Farda) is a 2022 Iranian drama film directed by Ali Asgari. Co‑written with Alireza Khatami, the film follows a young woman in Tehran who must conceal the existence of her infant from her conservative family. It premiered in the Panorama section of the 72nd Berlin International Film Festival.

== Plot ==
Fereshteh, a university student living in Tehran, works at a print shop while secretly raising her newborn child. When her parents unexpectedly announce a visit, she panics: they do not know about the baby, and revealing the truth could have severe social and familial consequences. With only a few hours to spare, she turns to her close friend Atefeh for help.

The two women spend the day searching for someone who can temporarily take care of the child. Their journey leads them through a series of encounters with acquaintances, former partners, and strangers, each revealing different facets of social pressure, judgment, and solidarity. As the day unfolds, Fereshteh is forced to confront the limits of her support network and the emotional cost of secrecy.

== Cast ==
- Sadaf Asgari as Fereshteh
- Amirreza Ranjbaran as Yaser
- Milad Moayeri
- Ghazal Shojaei as Atefeh
- Nahal Dashti as Nadia

== Production ==
The film was developed by Asgari and Khatami, who had previously collaborated on socially focused dramas. Shooting took place on location in Tehran with a cast composed largely of emerging performers.

== Release ==
Until Tomorrow premiered on 12 February 2022 in the Panorama section of the Berlin International Film Festival.

== Reception ==
The film received positive review by International Cinephile Society.

Lee Marshall for Screen International reviewed the film and praised the filming stating "beautifully expressive use of colour".
