= A Bit of Light (2026 film) =

2026 drama film by Ali Asgari

- Persian: کمی نور
- Directed by: Ali Asgari
- Written by: Ali Asgari; Shadmehr Rastin
- Produced by: Milad Khosravi; Afshin Salamian; Lorenzo Cioffi; Sholeh Alemi Fabbri; Giorgio Giampà; Francesco Melzi d'Eril
- Starring: Missagh Zareh; Sadaf Asgari; Forouzan Jamshidnejad; Ramtin Daghigh; Mina Rahimzadeh
- Cinematography: Iman Tahsin
- Edited by: Iman Tahsin
- Music by: Navid Divan
- Production companies: Seven Springs Pictures; Sunny Independent Pictures; Zoe Films; Good Measure Productions; Haurvatat Film
- Distributed by: Teodora Film (Italy)
- Release date: 11 September 2026 (Venice)
- Running time: 87 minutes
- Countries: Iran; Switzerland; Canada; Italy; Turkey
- Language: Persian
- Budget: $500,000 (estimated)

A Bit of Light (Persian: کمی نور, romanized: Kami nour) is a 2026 drama film directed by Ali Asgari, co-written with Shadmehr Rastin. A co-production between Iran, Switzerland, Canada, Italy, and Turkey, it stars Misagh Zareh as Arash, and follows an Iranian doctor contemplating suicide after being wrongfully imprisoned.

The film had its world premiere in the main competition of the 83rd Venice International Film Festival on 11 September 2026, where it will compete for the Golden Lion.

== Synopsis ==
An Iranian doctor plans to die by suicide after his arrest and the closure of his medical practice, but a final day with his family prompts him to reconsider his decision.

== Cast ==
- Misagh Zareh as Arash
- Sadaf Asgari as Mahsa
- Forouzan Jamshidnejad as Massi
- Ramtin Daghigh
- Mina Rahimzadeh

== Production ==
A co-production between Iran, Switzerland, Canada, Italy, and Turkey, the film is lead-produced by Milad Khosravi of Seven Springs Pictures, with co-production by Afshin Salamian of Sunny Independent Pictures, Lorenzo Cioffi and Giorgio Giampà of Zoe Films, Sholeh Alemi Fabbri of Good Measure Productions, Sara Nasrabadi of Haurvatat Film, Francesco Melzi d’Eril and Gabriele Moratti of MeMo Films, and Avantika Singh Desbouvries of Salt for Sugar Films. Odessa Rae and Taika Waititi serve as executive producers.

It marks Asgari's sixth feature, following Divine Comedy, which screened in the Orizzonti section of the 2025 Venice International Film Festival.

== Release ==
A Bit of Light premiered in competition for the Golden Lion at the 83rd Venice International Film Festival on 11 September 2026, marking Asgari's first feature film at the festival's main competition. It also made it to the 'Official Section' slate of the 71st Valladolid International Film Festival.

Salaud Morisset acquired worldwide sales rights. It will be theatrically released in Italy by Teodora Film.
