= 45365 =

- Directed by: Bill Ross IV; Turner Ross
- Produced by: Bill Ross IV; Turner Ross
- Edited by: Bill Ross IV
- Release dates: March 2009 (SXSW); June 18, 2010 (United States)
- Running time: 90 minutes
- Country: United States
- Language: English

45365 is a 2009 American documentary film made by first-time directors the Ross brothers, Bill Ross IV and Turner Ross. The film is about the everyday life of the small town Sidney, Ohio, and the people living in it; the title comes from the town's ZIP Code.

45365 premiered at the 2009 South by Southwest Film Festival, where it won the Grand Jury Prize. It won the Roger and Chaz Ebert Truer than Fiction award at the 2010 Independent Spirit Awards. Jeannette Catsoulis has described the film, "A beguiling slice of Midwestern impressionism, 45365 drops in on the residents of Sidney, Ohio, to observe their lunches and haircuts, trials and transgressions."
