= Bloody Nose, Empty Pockets =

American documentary film

- Film poster
- Directed by: Bill Ross IV; Turner Ross
- Produced by: Turner Ross; Bill Ross IV; Michael Gottwald; Chere Theriot; Jesy Rae Buhl
- Cinematography: Bill Ross IV; Turner Ross
- Edited by: Bill Ross IV
- Production companies: Department of Motion Pictures; Utopia; Concordia Studio; XTR; The Filmmaker Fund; Flies Collective
- Distributed by: Utopia
- Release date: January 24, 2020 (2020 Sundance Film Festival)
- Running time: 98 minutes
- Country: United States
- Language: English
- Budget: $10,000

Bloody Nose, Empty Pockets is a 2020 American documentary film by the Ross brothers that premiered at the 2020 Sundance Film Festival.

== Background ==
It was directed by Bill Ross IV and Turner Ross. It has a 91% rating on Rotten Tomatoes, and critics wondered if it is a true documentary or partly fiction, perhaps as something that is a new genre, but regardless, generally praised the film. It is about a dive bar in Las Vegas named the Roaring 20s, though due to cost restraints (of filming in Las Vegas) it was actually filmed inside a bar in Terrytown, Louisiana. It includes a number of characters at the bar and tells vignettes about them.
