= Black Milk (film) =

2020 film

- Film poster
- German: Schwarze Milch
- Directed by: Uisenma Borchu
- Written by: Uisenma Borchu
- Produced by: Sven Zellner
- Starring: See Cast
- Cinematography: Sven Zellner
- Edited by: Uisenma Borchu Christine Schorr
- Distributed by: Nine Film
- Release date: 21 February 2020 (Berlin)
- Running time: 92 minutes
- Countries: Germany; Mongolia
- Languages: German; Mongolian

Black Milk (German: Schwarze Milch) is a 2020 German-Mongolian drama film directed by Uisenma Borchu. It was selected to be shown in the Panorama section at the 70th Berlin International Film Festival.

== Plot ==
Two sisters meet again after decades of separation. At a young age Wessi moved to Germany, while Ossi stayed in Mongolia. Their world is turned upside down when Wessi returns to the Gobi Desert. Even after all these years the bond between both sisters has remained strong but the culture clash is causing tension. Wessi immediately wants to fully participate in the harsh nomadic life and admires Ossi's everyday skills. Ossi, on the other hand, seems overwhelmed by Wessi's modern attitude towards life and is even more unsettled when she realizes her sister is falling in love with the older neighbor. Wessi is desperate for his love and, as the rebel of the family, does not care about the traditions she didn't grow up with. A fight for love and recognition begins.

== Cast ==
- Gunsmaa Tsogzol as Ossi
- Uisenma Borchu as Wessi
- Franz Rogowski as Franz
- Terbish Demberel as Terbish
- Borchu Bawaa as Boro

== Reception ==
A Mongolian woman disillusioned with the West returns to her native land to visit her sister in Uisenma Borchu's sexually liberated drama of the steppes.

Kaleem Aftab of Cineuropa wrote in the Berlinale Panorama Review on 'Black Milk' that Uisenma Borchu brilliantly deconstructs her life in Germany, the dominance of the male gender, and the almost colonial dismissal of her desire to go and visit her sister in Mongolia, a country she left as a small child. Aftab said Black Milk is a work that confounds expectations and gives insights into the myriad influences that Wessi has. It's a unique perspective in cinema, but one that will be recognised by the very many who feel othered because of their heritage, who have one foot each in two different boats that are seemingly travelling in different directions. On the visual style of the movie Aftab wrote that the cinematography of Sven Zellner captures the vast landscape and beauty, but also offers a darker and more raw view of a land that is so often romanticised on film. Deborah Young of The Hollywood Reporter wrote that the tech work of 'Black Milk' is warm and modern, beginning with DP Sven Zellner's switch-hitting between open air vistas and the dreamlike intimacy of the women indoors and in their fantasies. The use of slight jump cuts speeds things up nicely.
