= XTR (company) =

American film company

- Industry: Film industry
- Founded: 2019
- Founder: Bryn Mooser
- Headquarters: Los Angeles, California, U.S.
- Area served: United States
- Divisions: XTR Film Society
- Website: xtr.com

XTR is an American independent film production company founded in 2019 by Bryn Mooser. The company is best known for producing the films Mucho Mucho Amor: The Legend of Walter Mercado (2020), Bloody Nose, Empty Pockets (2020), The Fight (2020), 76 Days (2020), and Ascension (2021).

== History ==
In September 2019, it was announced that Bryn Mooser had launched XTR, a film and television production company specializing in documentaries. Through XTR Film Society, a non-profit division of the company, XTR offers grants to filmmakers making documentaries with less commercial value.

In October 2020, it was announced that Tony Hsieh had invested $17.5 million dollars in the company, which would be used to finance and produce films, and offer grants to filmmakers.

Documentary+, XTR's free streaming platform for nonfiction film and TV, was launched in January 2021.

In October 2022, XTR Studios opened a 35,000-square-foot production facility and headquarters in Echo Park.

In January 2024, XTR launched a branded-content division led by Kelly Spencer.

XTR has produced the television series They Call Me Magic for Apple TV+, Sasha Reid and the Midnight Order for Freeform, and Trophy Wife: Murder on Safari for Hulu.

== Filmography ==
=== 2020s ===
Release date	Title	Notes
July 8, 2020	Mucho Mucho Amor: The Legend of Walter Mercado	distributed by Netflix
July 10, 2020	Bloody Nose, Empty Pockets	distributed by Utopia
July 31, 2020	The Fight	distributed by Magnolia Pictures
August 28, 2020	You Cannot Kill David Arquette	distributed by Super LTD
August 28, 2020	Feels Good Man	distributed by Independent Lens
December 4, 2020	76 Days	distributed by MTV Documentary Films
March 26, 2021	Miracle Fishing: Kidnapped Abroad	distributed by Discovery+ and Gravitas Ventures
May 14, 2021	Us Kids	distributed by Greenwich Entertainment
June 25, 2021	Rebel Hearts	distributed by Discovery+
July 2, 2021	Kid Candidate	distributed by Gunpowder & Sky
July 23, 2021	Ailey	distributed by Neon
August 6, 2021	Bring Your Own Brigade	distributed by CBSN
August 12, 2021	Homeroom	distributed by Hulu
September 3, 2021	Faya Dayi	distributed by Janus Films
October 8, 2021	Ascension	distributed by MTV Documentary Films
October 22, 2021	At the Ready	distributed by Gravitas Ventures
December 3, 2021	Try Harder	distributed by Greenwich Entertainment
July 27, 2022	We Met in Virtual Reality	distributed by HBO Documentary Films
August 12, 2022	Free Chol Soo Lee	distributed by Mubi
August 19, 2022	The Territory	distributed by National Geographic Documentary Films
September 30, 2022	Sirens	distributed by Oscilloscope
November 4, 2022	Meet Me in the Bathroom	distributed by Utopia and Showtime
January 9, 2023	I Didn't See You There	distributed by POV
May 19, 2023	The Thief Collector	distributed by FilmRise
June 9, 2023	Users	distributed by Icarus Films
July 14, 2023	Lakota Nation vs. United States	distributed by IFC Films
August 25, 2023	Carpet Cowboys	distributed by MEMORY
October 6, 2023	Plan C	distributed by Level 33 Entertainment
October 11, 2023	Reality Winner	distributed by Codebreaker Films
October 20, 2023	We Dare to Dream	distributed by Violet Films
October 25, 2023	Periodical	distributed by MSNBC Films
March 17, 2024	Butterfly in the Sky	distributed by AMC Theatres
May 10, 2024	Gasoline Rainbow	distributed by Mubi
August 14, 2024	Daughters	distributed by Netflix

=== Upcoming ===
Release date	Title	Notes
TBA	Wake Up on Mars	
TBA	Faceless	
