= Ronin (band) =

Singaporean rock band

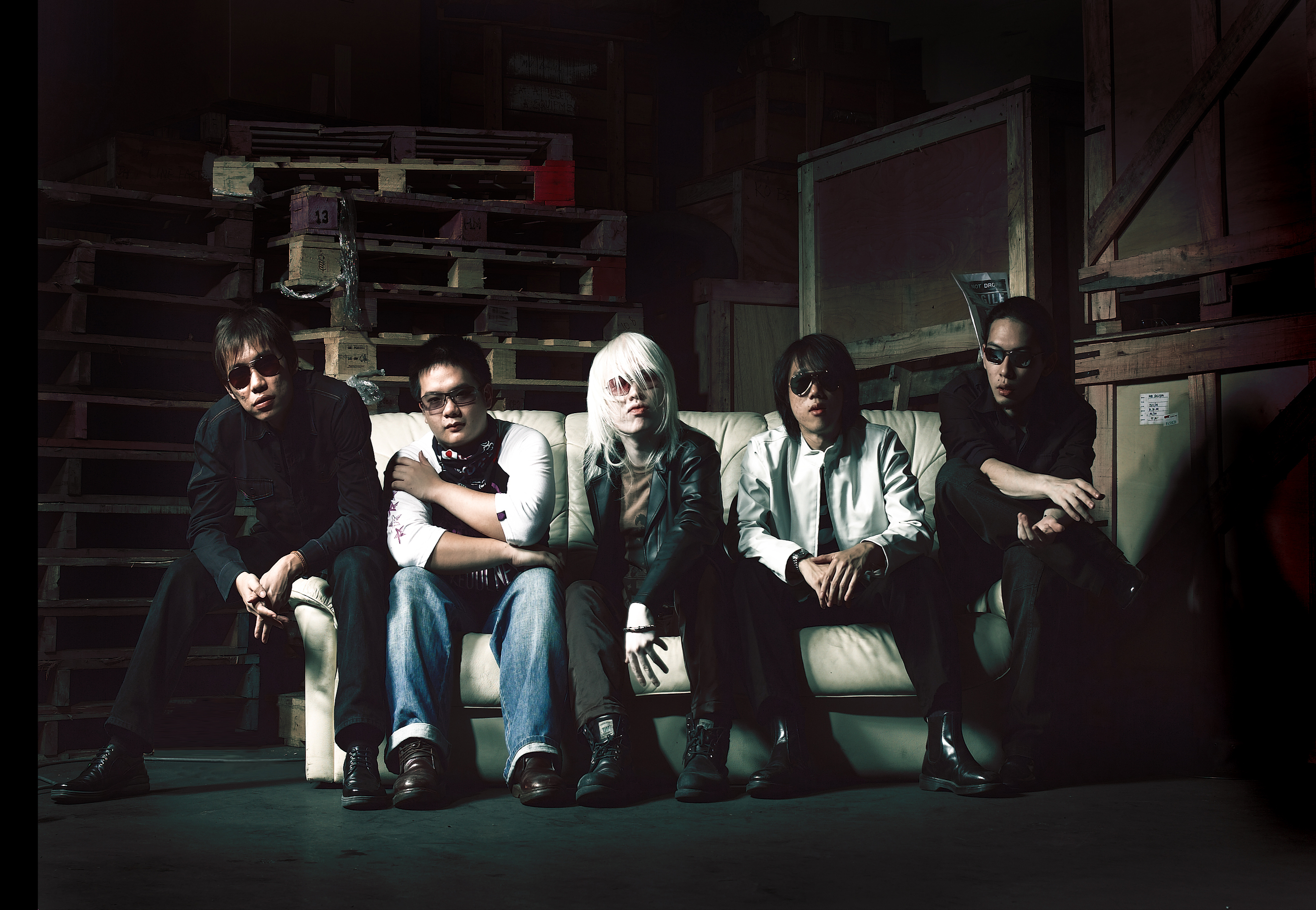
- Ronin Singapore: (left to right) Simon Lee, Bang Ong, Levan Wee, Sean Cheng, Derryn Wong

Background information
- Origin: Singapore
- Genres: Rock
- Years active: 2003–2008
- Label: Universal
- Members: Sean Cheng; Derryn Wong; Simon Lee; Bang Ong
- Past members: Levan Wee

Ronin was a rock band based in Singapore. They were known for their live performances and being one of the few popular bands in the hard/classic rock genre from Singapore. Before their entry to the mainstream market, the band launched a self-released EP which included five songs, and later released an LP which was hugely successful. Their debut album Do or Die received rave reviews by local press, and is one of the top selling English-language albums in Singapore of all time. In 2006, the band collaborated with local Mediacorp artiste Fiona Xie in a love song duet, entitled "Love Will Shine on Through". The song was recorded to raise funds for a cancer project, with a book and a CD recorded together. One of their songs, "One More Moment", was covered by Singaporean artiste Ho Yeow Sun.

The band enjoyed a number one hit on local radio station 98.7, Black Maria in the Singapore charts, the song Crazy Son reached third. Ronin has also written the theme song and title soundtrack 'Memories' for the film Singapore Dreaming.

In June 2007, lead singer Levan Wee performed with the band for the last time, due to a combination of personal issues, as well as differences in musical direction. The band continued for a short while after, but has been inactive as of 2008.

== Members ==
- Sean Cheng: guitar
- Simon Lee: guitar
- Derryn Wong: bass
- Bang Ong: drums

Previous members

- Levan Wee: vocals (left in 2007)

All five members and ex-member of Ronin were students from Victoria School. The band members have cameo appearances in the movie Anna & Anna, starring Karena Lam. They appear as the backing band of the film's lead actor, Tender Huang.

== Discography ==
- The EP – a five-song EP which was self-released in January 2004. It was recorded at Snakeweed Studios, produced by Leonard Soosay and Ronin, and mastered at 301 Studios in Sydney.
- Do or Die – a full-length album released in August 2005 and distributed by Universal Music. Recorded at Snakeweed Studios and produced by Leonard Soosay and Ronin.
