= Ross brothers =

American film directors

Bill and Turner Ross
- Born: Bill Ross IV; Turner Ross; Sidney, Ohio, U.S.
- Occupations: Directors; cinematographers; editors; actors
- Years active: 2009–present
- Website: rossbros.net

Bill Ross IV and Turner Ross, collectively known as the Ross Brothers are an American independent filmmaking duo. They are known for the feature films 45365, Bloody Nose, Empty Pockets and Contemporary Color.

== Early life ==
Bill and Turner were born in Sidney, Ohio, in 1980 and 1982 respectively. The pair eventually moved to New Orleans and began making films as a duo, shooting, editing, directing and conceiving of their projects in tandem.

== Career ==
=== 45365 ===
The first film by The Ross Brothers was their 2009 feature 45365, which explores a day in the life of their hometown, Sidney, Ohio. The title is derived from the zip code of the town. Captured in a stream of consciousness, vérité style, the film functions as a portrait of a city and its people. Roger Ebert called it "an achingly beautiful film". The film went on to win the Grand Jury Prize at SXSW and an Independent Spirit Award.

=== Tchoupitoulas ===
Their sophomore effort was 2012's Tchoupitoulas, which follows a street in New Orleans, Louisiana, United States. Set over the course of a night, the film shows New Orleans from the street level, luxuriating in the idiosyncrasies of the vibrant, complex city as three young brothers wander around after missing the final ferry home. The film was the recipipient of the True Vision Award from the True/False Film Festival.

=== Western ===
Western is the story of two towns beside one another, on either side of the US/Mexico border along the Rio Grande River; Eagle Pass, Texas and Piedras Niegras, Mexico. The film primarily documents the daily activities of Chad Foster, a former mayor and strong opponent to the federal border fence, and Martín Wall, a cattle broker whose business is halted by the government sanctions responding to narco-violence across the border.

=== Contemporary Color ===
In 2015, David Byrne organized a new show titled Contemporary Color. It consisted of two arena concerts in Brooklyn and Toronto, and featured ten musical acts, including Nelly Furtado, Devonte Hynes, Ad-Rock and St. Vincent who teamed up with ten color guard groups from across America. The Ross Brothers came aboard and made a concert documentary about the event.

=== Bloody Nose, Empty Pockets ===
Their most formalistically ambitious film to date, Bloody Nose, Empty Pockets is the tale of a Las Vegas dive bar called the Roaring 20s during its final night before shutting down. In reality, the bar used as a set was actually filmed inside a bar in Terrytown, Louisiana. The film features both actors and real people, filmed together in improvised situations.

The film premiered at the 2020 Sundance Film Festival.

=== Gasoline Rainbow ===
Premiering at the 80th Venice International Film Festival, Gasoline Rainbow is The Ross Brothers' first fully acknowledged, pure fiction film. Utilizing their observational, unscripted style, the film follows five Gen-z teenagers from a small town in Oregon who set out on a great American road trip, in search of "The Party at the End of the World".

=== Future projects ===
In June 2025, the Ross Brothers began production of an as yet untitled film in Magdalena, New Mexico.

== Influences ==
The Ross Brothers have referenced the films of Les Blank, Touki Bouki by Djibril Diop Mambéty and the works of Robert Altman as being major influences in style and storytelling. On Les Blank they've stated "When you watch a Les Blank film, you’re watching him see the world. You see his humanity, and it’s sloppy and messy and sweaty and loving."

== Filmography ==
- 2009: 45365
- 2010: Dinosaur Curtains
- 2012: Tchoupitoulas
- 2013: River
- 2015: Western
- 2016: Contemporary Color
- 2018: No Time to Look Back
- 2020: Bloody Nose, Empty Pockets
- 2021: Second Star to the Right and Straight on 'Til Morning
- 2023: Rose City Hurricane
- 2023: Gasoline Rainbow
