= Talking Cock the Movie =

- Directed by: Colin Goh; Woo Yen Yen
- Cinematography: Colin Cheong
- Distributed by: Shaw Organisation
- Release date: 22 May 2002
- Country: Singapore
- Languages: Singlish, Malay, Tamil, Various Chinese Varieties

Talking Cock the Movie is a Singapore film released in May 2002. It is the brainchild of Colin Goh, founder of Singaporean website, TalkingCock.com, which satirises local current affairs and politics, highlighting the importance of supporting free speech in Singapore.

The film includes the use of Malay, Tamil, various Chinese varieties, as well as the unique blend of vernacular English called Singlish. The film was completely subtitled in English.

== Synopsis ==
The film features four short stories, linked by a series of sketches and animated sequences based on some of TalkingCock.com's most popular characters, such as the Turbanator and Lim Peh. The stories are briefly as follows:

=== eAhLong.com ===
A young polytechnic graduate wants to dotcom his father's loan shark business. A wry look at an old profession's collision with the new economy.

=== Wrong Number ===
It is about a young man who loses his mobile phone in a taxi, and the strange circumstances that ensue when he meets the person who has found it.

=== Steam ===
A young girl working in a dim sum shop decides to woo one of her customers and hid a message within a bun to give to him.

=== Razi Learns To Rock ===
A hard rock band scrambles to find a substitute after losing their lead singer and has to educate him in the art of being cool.

=== Auntie Auntie Power ===
An office worker insults a tea-lady. Unbeknownst to him, the tea-lady has a network of friends, who she enlists to enact revenge. They taint the man's soup with laxatives, pour itching powder on his toilet-paper, and fine him for illegal parking before he can drive off.

== Cast ==
The film stars non-professional locals plucked from the heartland, in several scenes depicting the lives of exaggerated stereotype characters of the heartland.

== Production ==
The film is directed by Colin Goh and Woo Yen Yen.

== Release ==
The film was shown during the 28th Singapore International Film Festival as part of 15th anniversary screening of local films alongside I Not Stupid by Jack Neo.
