= Disappearance (2017 Iranian film) =

2017 film by Ali Asgari

- Film poster
- Directed by: Ali Asgari
- Written by: Ali Asgari; Farnoosh Samadi
- Starring: Sadaf Asgari; Amirreza Ranjbaran; Nazanin Ahmadi
- Cinematography: Ashkan Ashkani
- Edited by: Ehsan Vaseghi
- Release date: 8 September 2017 (Venice)
- Running time: 89 minutes
- Country: Iran
- Language: Persian

Disappearance is a 2017 Iranian drama film directed by Ali Asgari. The film had its world premiere at the 74th Venice International Film Festival in the Orizzonti section and later it was screened in the Discovery section at the 2017 Toronto International Film Festival.

== Cast ==
- Sadaf Asgari
- Amir Reza Ranjbaran
- Nazanin Ahmadi
- Pedram Ansari
- Mohammad Heidari

== Reception ==
On review aggregator Rotten Tomatoes, the film holds an approval rating of 64% based on 11 reviews, with an average rating of 6.1/10.
