= TalkingCock.com =

Singaporean satirical and humour website

TalkingCock.com was a Singaporean satirical and humour website. The website featured various articles and jokes spoofing Singapore current affairs, which occasionally poked fun at world happenings. "Talking cock", which describes the act of engaging in idle banter or perhaps more literally "talking nonsense", is a common phrase in Singlish.

== History ==
Started in August 2000 by Colin Goh, a film director, cartoonist and former lawyer, the website provides commentary and pokes fun at local news and issues, in particular political, with much of its content written by anonymous contributors. It has established notability over the years, with mention given by the Singapore parliament, the foreign media, and Prime Minister Lee Hsien Loong in his 2006 National Day Rally speech. In a country of 4.4 million people (as of 2006), the popular website receives 4 million hits per month.

It is also home of the Coxford Singlish Dictionary, which is the de facto Singlish dictionary frequently quoted off by the local press. It has led a campaign against the government's attempts of discouraging the use of Singlish. Its comic, Alien Talent, is published on tabloid The New Paper daily.

In January 2009, TalkingCock.com initially went on indefinite hiatus. By October 2012, the site had declared itself defunct, citing its mention in the 2006 National Day speech and the popularity of other satire sites in the intervening years.

The website's domain expired in early 2021, and the website has been offline ever since.

== Film ==
The website inspired a movie, Talking Cock the Movie, also directed by Goh.

== See also ==
- Singlish
- Culture of Singapore
