= Uisenma Borchu =

Mongolian-German film director

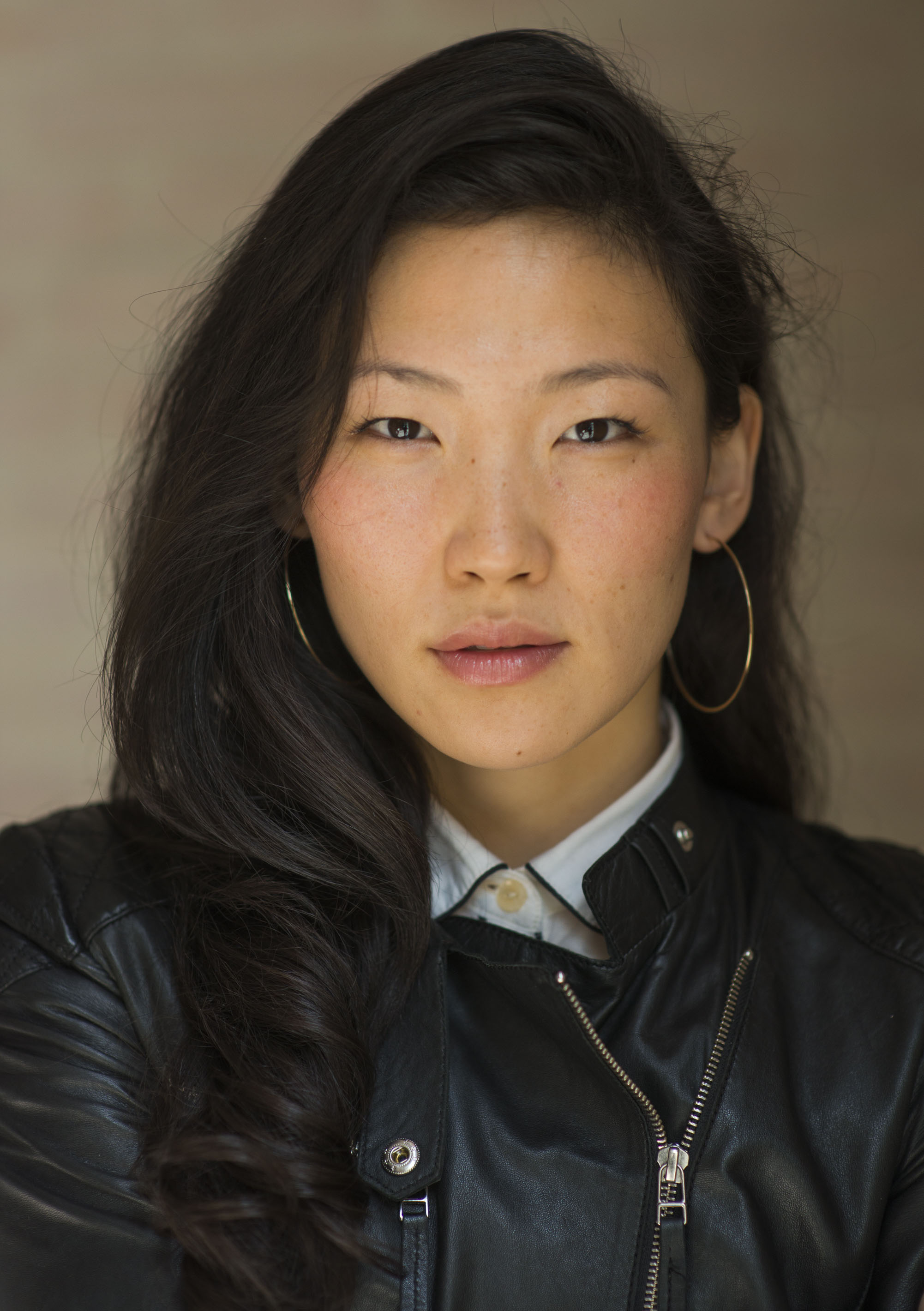
- Borchu in 2016
- Born: Borchüügiin Üizenmaa; 1 June 1984 (age 42); Ulan Bator, Mongolian People's Republic
- Occupations: Actress; Film producer
- Years active: 2007–present
- Awards: See Awards
- Website: Official website

Uisenma Borchu (Mongolian: Борхүүгийн Үйзэнмаа; born Borkhüügiin Üizenmaa; 1 June 1984) is a Mongolian-German film maker and film actress. In 1989, she moved with her family from Communist Mongolia to East Germany—which was on the brink of reunification, where she grew up. During the period of 2006 to 2015 she studied documentary film at the University of Television and Film in Munich.

== Filmography ==
=== Feature films ===
| Year | Title | Director | Writer | Editor | Notes |
|---|---|---|---|---|---|
| 2007 | Donne-moi plus | Yes | Yes | Yes | Short |
| 2011 | Himmel voller Geigen | Yes | Yes | Yes | |
| 2012 | Khuyagaa – Tag im Leben eines Nomadenjungen | Yes | Yes | No | |
| 2012 | Preis des Goldes | No | No | Yes | |
| 2015 | Don't Look at Me That Way | Yes | Yes | No | |
| 2020 | Black Milk | Yes | Yes | Yes | |

=== Acting roles ===
| Year | Title | Role | Ref. |
|---|---|---|---|
| 2015 | Don't Look at Me That Way | Hedi | |
| 2018 | Asphaltgorillas | The Hitman | |
| 2020 | Black Milk | Wessi | |

== Awards and nominations ==
| Year | Award | Category | Project | Result | Ref. |
|---|---|---|---|---|---|
| 2015 | Bayerischer Filmpreis | Best New Director | Don't look at me that way | Won | |
| 2016 | Osaka Asian Film Festival | Most Promising Talent Award | Don't look at me that way | Won | |
| 2015 | Filmfest München | Fipresci Film Critics Prize | Don't look at me that way | Won | |
| 2012 | International Documentary Film Festival Munich | Megaherz Film School Award | Himmel voller Geigen | Won | |
| 2016 | Taipei Film Festival | Grand Prix of the International New Talent Competition | Don't look at me that way | Won | |
| 2016 | Association for the Development of Mongolian Women in Europe | Mongolian Woman of the Year | | Won | |
