= Colin Goh =

Singaporean filmmaker and writer (born 1970)

Colin Goh (simplified Chinese: 吴荣平; traditional Chinese: 吳榮平; pinyin: Wú Róng Píng) is a Singaporean film maker, satirist and cartoonist. He was a former practicing attorney who has turned to full-time writing and illustration, and has been serving as the Director of Advancement at the Intercultural Theatre Institute in Singapore since 2026.

== Early life and education ==
Born in 1970 he was educated at the Anglo-Chinese School. He received a Bachelor of Laws from UCL and a Master of Laws from Columbia Law School in 1999.

== Career ==
Goh first rose to prominence with his comic strip, The Concrete Jungle, which appeared on a regular basis in the Singapore tabloid, The New Paper.

In 1996, his play, The Body Politic, was performed at the Singapore Arts Festival. The play was also performed at the Royal Court Theatre in London. He went on to set up talkingcock.com, a website which poked fun at the various idiosyncratic aspects of what it meant to be a Singaporean. The site's copious use of Singlish and occasional digs at the bureaucracies made it a popular one.

Together with his wife, Joyceln Woo Yen Yen, they made their first full-feature film, Talking Cock (2002). They won the Montblanc award for best new screenwriters at the 54th San Sebastian International Film Festival for their second film Singapore Dreaming (2006). The couple also produce Dim Sum Warriors, a graphic novel and bilingual iPad app series about kung fu-fighting dumplings. Dim Sum Warrior was made into a Chinese musical which was produced by Stan Lai, one of China's most renowned theatre directors, and scored by Pulitzer Prize winning Chinese-born composer Du Yun. The musical debuted on 11 August 2017, to sold-out audiences at Theatre Above in China.

== Personal life ==
He is married to Joyceln Woo Yen Yen. Goh regularly contributes satirical pieces to Singapore's 8 Days magazine. In 2014, Goh contributed a short story to the Singapore Noir anthology.
