= Oblivion Verses =

2017 film

- Directed by: Alireza Khatami
- Screenplay by: Alireza Khatami
- Starring: Juan Margallo
- Cinematography: Antoine Héberlé
- Edited by: Florent Mangeot
- Release date: 2017
- Language: Spanish

Oblivion Verses (French: Les Versets de l'oubli, Spanish: Los versos del olvido) is a 2017 drama film written and directed by Iranian filmmaker Alireza Khatami, in his feature film debut.

A co-production between France, Germany, Netherlands and Chile, the film was entered into the Horizons competition at the 74th edition of the Venice Film Festival, winning the prize for best screenplay.

== Cast ==
- Juan Margallo as the morgue attendant
- Manuel Moron as the hearse driver
- Itziar Aizpuru as the old woman
- Tomás del Estal as the gravedigger
- Julio Jung as the archive man
- Gonzalo Robles as the cemetery administrator

== Reception ==
On the review aggregator website Rotten Tomatoes, 83% of 6 critics' reviews are positive, with an average rating of 6.0/10.
