= Don't Look at Me That Way =

2015 German film

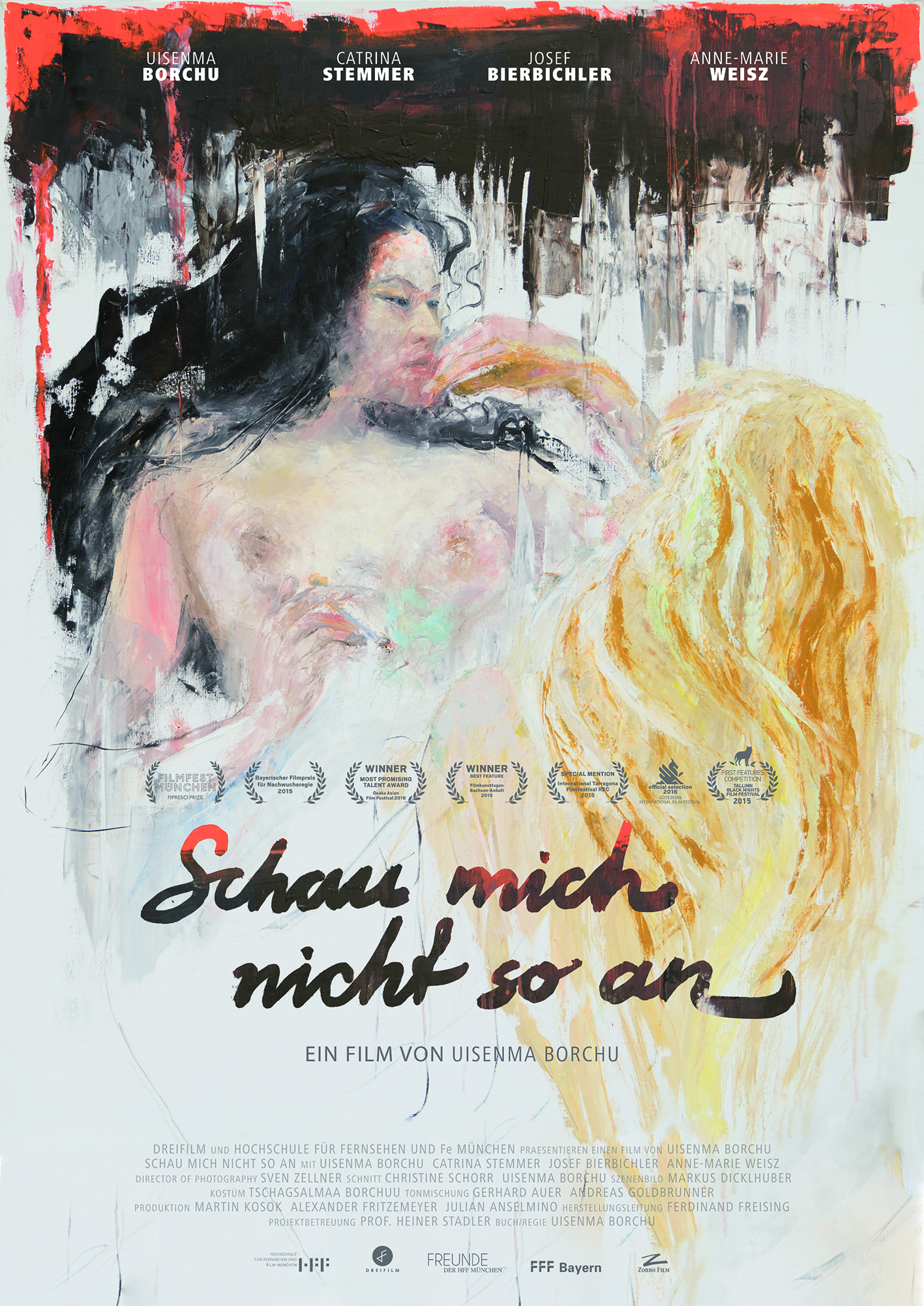
- German movie poster
- German: Schau mich nicht so an
- Directed by: Uisenma Borchu
- Written by: Uisenma Borchu
- Produced by: Martin Kosok
- Starring: Uisenma Borchu; Catrina Stemmer; Josef Bierbichler; Anne-Marie Weisz
- Cinematography: Sven Zellner
- Edited by: Christine Schorr
- Release date: 2015
- Running time: 88 minutes
- Country: Germany
- Languages: German, Mongolian

Don't Look at Me That Way (German original title: Schau mich nicht so an) is a 2015 German feature film directed by Uisenma Borchu, who also wrote the script and starred in the film. The film had its world premiere at the 33rd Filmfest München in the category "Neues Deutsches Kino" ("New German Cinema"). It is considered an overwhelming feature film that provocatively questions gender roles and is about an erotic power struggle between two young city women.

== Plot ==
While looking for 5-year-old Sofia, the single mother Iva meets her neighbor Hedi. A sexual relationship quickly develops between the two. Instead of the longed-for love, however, a one-sided dependency arises, and Sofia and Hedi join forces.

After a long time, Iva's father returns and tries to rebuild the abandoned relationship with his daughter and granddaughter. He and Hedi get dangerously close and the situation escalates when they start an affair.

Dream scenes in which Hedi and Sofia visit Hedi's grandmother in Mongolia are recorded without comment.

== Cast ==
- Uisenma Borchu as Hedi
- Catrina Stemmer as Iva
- Josef Bierbichler as the grandfather
- Anne-Marie Weisz as Sofia

== Production ==
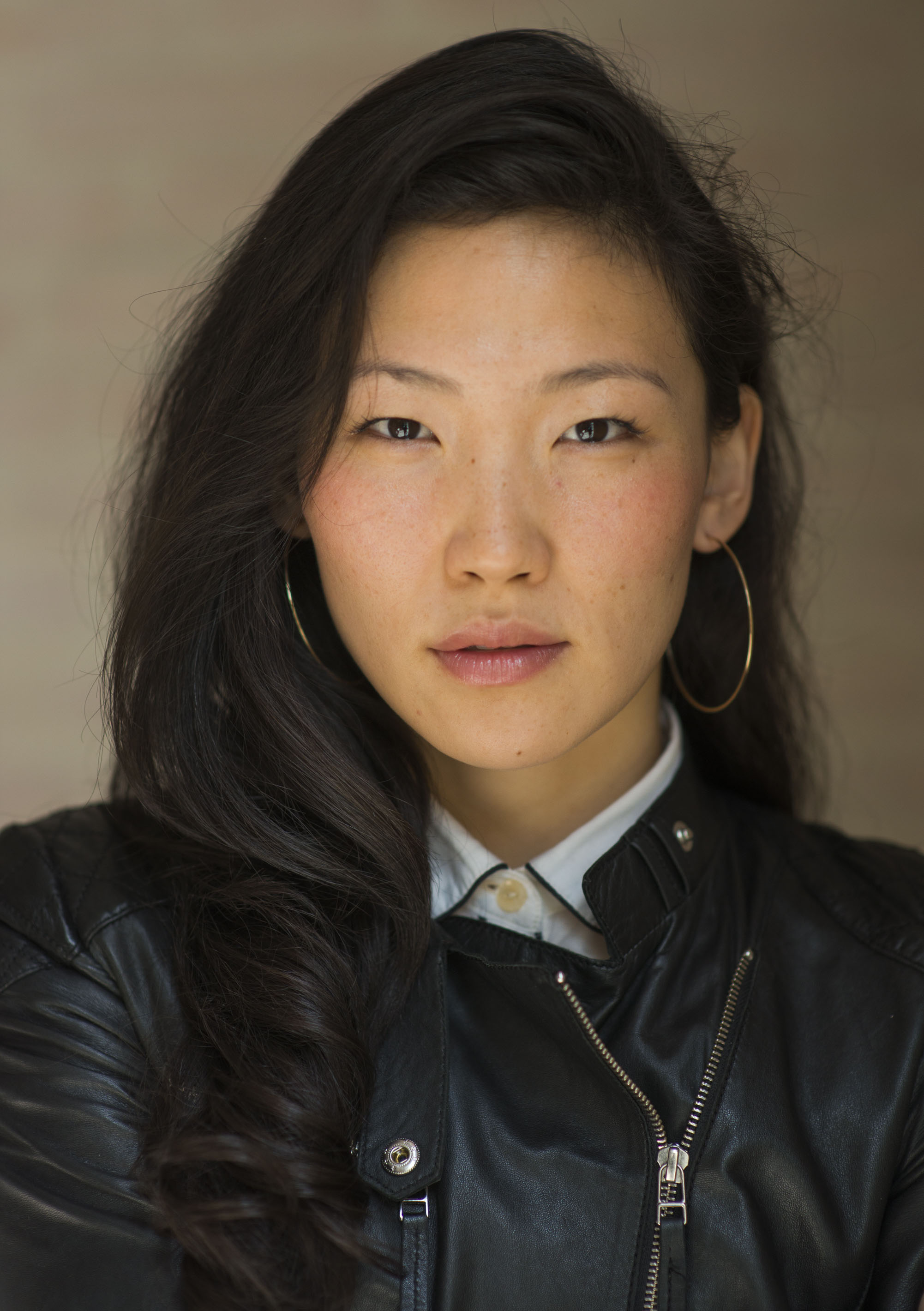
Uisenma Borchu in 2016, leading actress and director

In the film, the director Uisenma Borchu plays a leading role alongside Catrina Stemmer, Josef Bierbichler and Anne-Marie Weisz. The film was rejected by various broadcasters and the film subsidy, and has a very low budget from the University of Television and Film Munich and the Society of Friends and Sponsors of the University of Television and Film in Munich e. V. of €25,000 was made as a diploma film.

== Reception ==
=== Awards ===
- Fipresci Film Critics Prize at the 33rd Filmfest München
- Special Mention at the International Tarragona Filmfestival REC 2015
- Bester Film (Best Film) at the Filmkunsttagen Sachsen-Anhalt 2015
- Bayerischer Filmpreis für Nachwuchsregie 2015
- Most Promising Talent Award 2016 at the Osaka Asian Filmfestival
- Grand Prix at the International New Talent Competition of the 18th Taipei Film Festivals
