= Terrestrial Verses =

- International promotional poster
- Persian: آیه های زمینی
- Directed by: Ali Asgari; Alireza Khatami
- Written by: Ali Asgari; Alireza Khatami
- Produced by: Ali Asgari; Milad Khosravi
- Starring: Sadaf Asgari; Bahram Ark; Ardeshir Kazemi; Gohar Kheirandish; Farzin Mohades; Faezeh Rad; Majid Salehi; Hossein Soleimani
- Cinematography: Adib Sobhani
- Edited by: Ehsan Vaseghi
- Production companies: Cynefilms; Seven Springs Pictures; Taat Films
- Distributed by: Films Boutique (Worldwide)
- Release date: 23 May 2023 (Cannes)
- Running time: 77 minutes
- Country: Iran
- Language: Persian

Terrestrial Verses (Persian: آیه های زمینی) is a 2023 Iranian film written and directed by Ali Asgari and Alireza Khatami.

It had its world premiere at the Un Certain Regard section of the 2023 Cannes Film Festival, on 23 May 2023. The film also had theatrical release in France, where it achieved approximately 100,000 admissions.

== Synopsis ==
The film contains nine vignettes in which ordinary Iranian citizens struggle against the power of religiously-guided authoritarianism in everyday situations.

== Cast ==
- Sadaf Asgari as Sadaf
- Bahram Ark as Bahram
- Ardeshir Kazemi as 100-year-old man
- Gohar Kheirandish as Mehri
- Farzin Mohades as Ali
- Faezeh Rad as Faezeh
- Majid Salehi as Siamak
- Hossein Soleimani as Farbod Akhtari
- Sarvin Zabetian as Aram
- Arghavan Shabani as Selena

== Production ==
Asgari and Khatami worked on the script together, but had difficulty finding a producer and ultimately produced the film at their own expense with financial support from friends. The film was then shot within seven days.

== Release ==
The film premiered on May 23, 2023, in Cannes, after which it was shown on October 4, 2023, at the BFI Film Festival in London, on October 19, 2023, in the USA during the Chicago International Film Festival and at other international film festivals. The cinema release in Germany was April 11, 2024.

== Reception ==
=== Critical response ===
On review aggregator Rotten Tomatoes, the film holds an approval rating of 96% based on 28 reviews, with an average rating of 7.8/10. On Metacritic, the film has a weighted average score of 83 out of 100, based on 11 critics, indicating "universal acclaim".

=== Awards ===
The film won both the Grand Prix and the FIPRESCI Award at 2024 Luxembourg City Film Festival.
