= Alireza Khatami =

Iranian-Canadian filmmaker

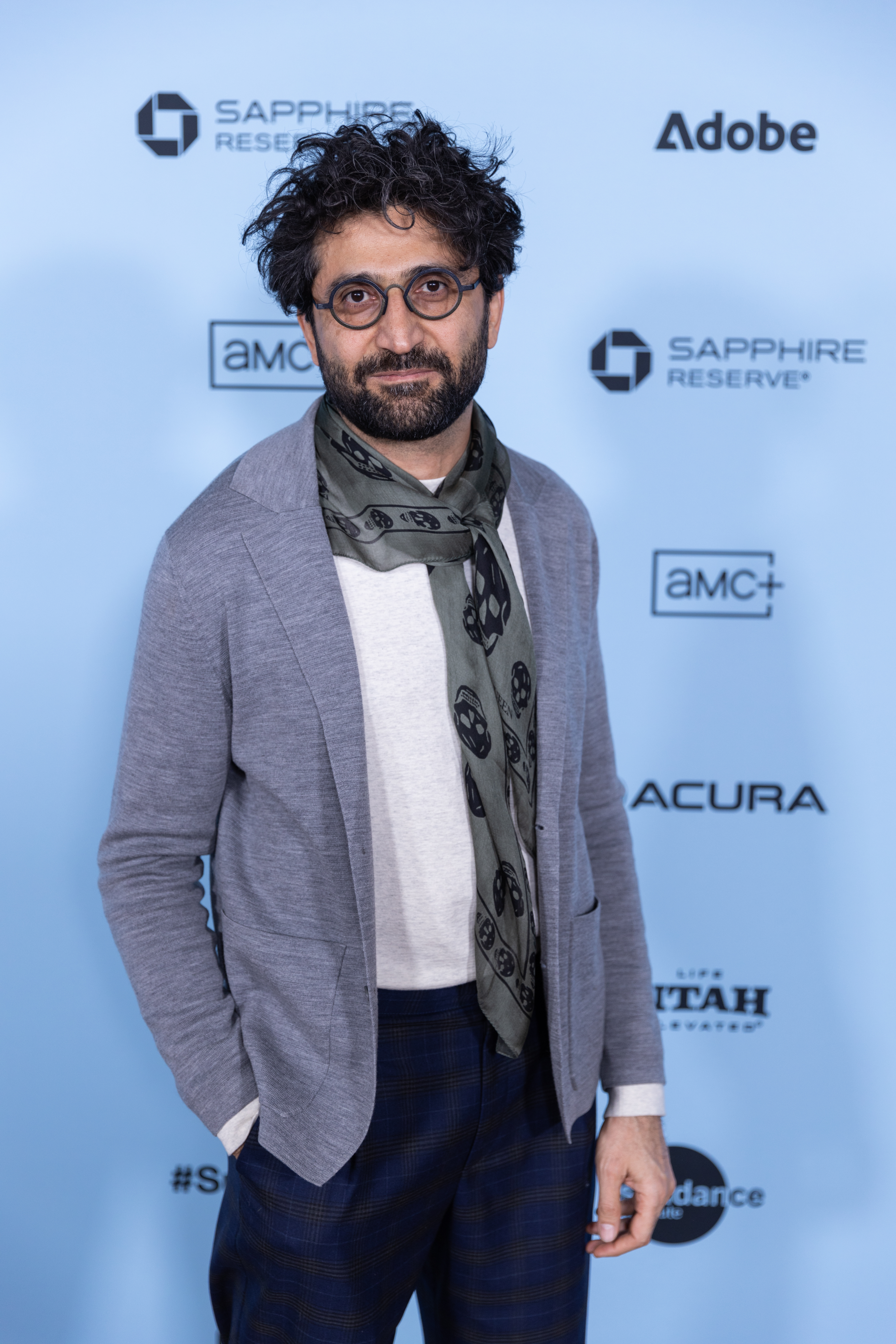
- Born: 1980 (age 45–46); Iran
- Occupations: Film director, screenwriter
- Years active: 2010s–present

Alireza Khatami (born 1980) is an Iranian-Canadian film director and screenwriter. He is most noted for his 2025 film The Things You Kill, which was selected as Canada's submission for the Best International Feature Film award at the 98th Academy Awards.

His debut feature film, Oblivion Verses, debuted in the Orizzonti program at the 74th Venice International Film Festival in 2017, where it won a number of awards including Best Screenplay in the Orrizonti section, the FIPRESCI Award and the Interfilm award.

In 2023, Khatami and Ali Asgari collaborated on Terrestrial Verses, which premiered in the Un Certain Regard section at the 2023 Cannes Film Festival.

The Things You Kill premiered at the 2025 Sundance Film Festival, where it was named the winner of the World Cinema Dramatic Competition.

He is an associate professor of film at Toronto Metropolitan University.

== Filmography ==
- Oblivion Verses - 2017
- Terrestrial Verses - 2023
- The Things You Kill - 2025
