= Ali Asgari (director) =

Iranian film director (born 1982)

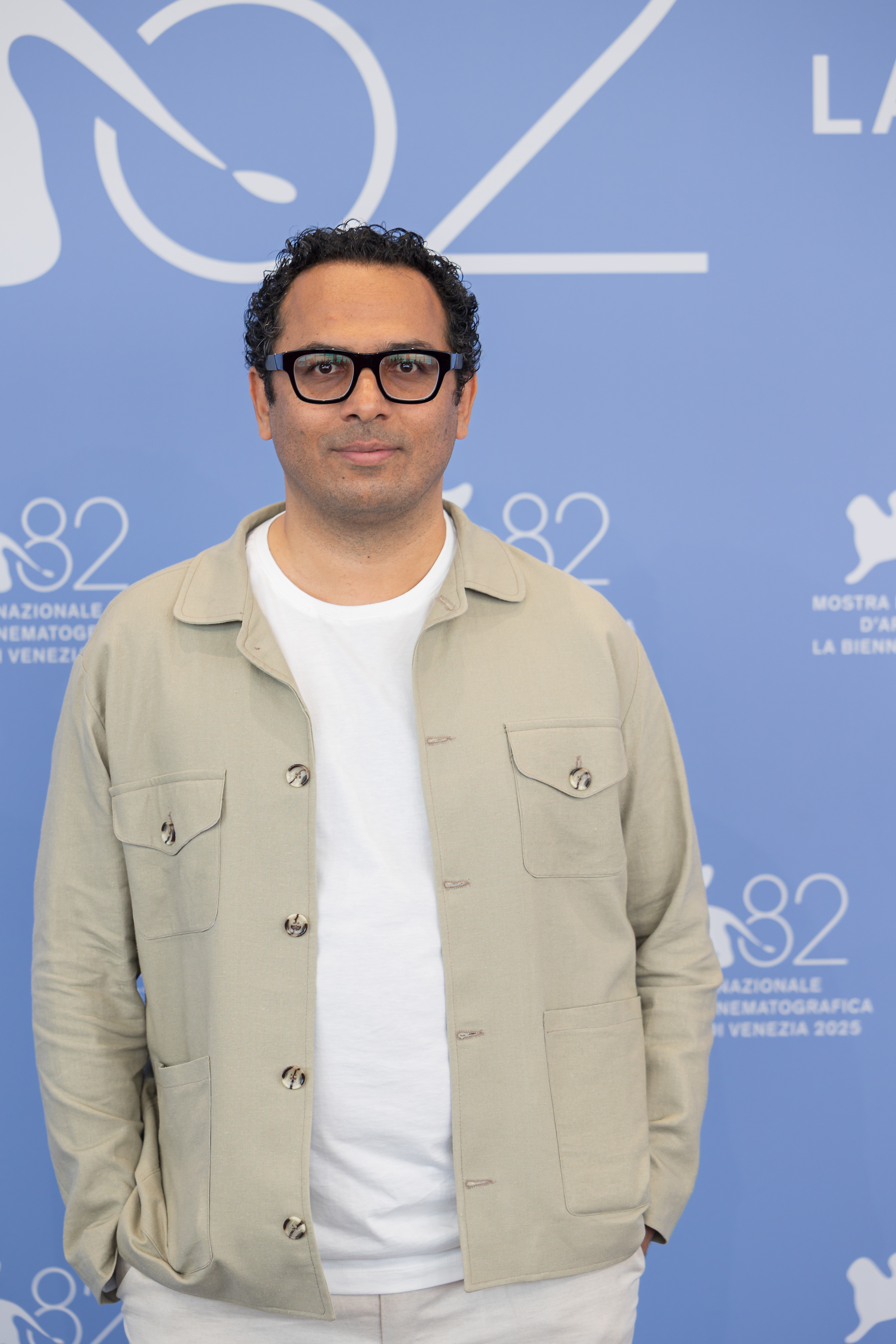
- Asgari in 2025
- Born: 25 July 1982 (age 44); Tehran, Iran
- Occupations: Film director, Screenwriter, Producer

Ali Asgari (Persian: علی عسگری; born 25 July 1982) is an Iranian film director, screenwriter and producer.

== Life and career ==
Born in Tehran, after his 2007 graduation from the Islamic Azad University Asgari went to study cinema in Italy. After directing several shorts, in 2016 he directed a segment of the anthology film In the Same Garden.

Asgari made his solo feature film debut in 2017 with Disappearance, which premiered at the 74th Venice International Film Festival in the Horizons sidebar and was later screened at the 42nd Toronto Film Festival. In 2022, his film Until Tomorrow was screened at the 72nd Berlin International Film Festival. The satirical film Terrestrial Verses he co-directed with Alireza Khatami was entered into the Un Certain Regard section of the 2023 Cannes Film Festival; upon his return in Iran, Asgari got his passport temporarily confiscated and was banned from directing other films. In 2025, Asgari directed Divine Comedy, which was selected for the Orizzonti competition at the 82nd Venice Film Festival.

== Filmography ==
=== Feature films ===
Year	English Title	Original Title	Notes
2016	In the Same Garden		
2017	Disappearance		
2022	Until Tomorrow	تا فردا	
2023	Terrestrial Verses	آیه های زمینی	Co-directed with Alireza Khatami
2024	Higher Than Acidic Clouds		Documentary
2025	Divine Comedy	کمدی الهی	
2026	A Bit of Light	کمی نور	

=== Short films ===
Year	Title	Notes
2011	Tonight Is Not a Good Night for Dying	
2012	Barbie	
2013	More Than Two Hours	
2014	The Baby	
2015	La douleur	
2016	The Silence	Co-directed with Farnoosh Samadi
2018	Delay	
2020	Witness	
2020	Pilgrims	Co-directed with Farnoosh Samadi
2022	Over Mij	
2023	My Name Is Aseman	Co-directed with Gianluca Mangiasciutti

== Jury memberships ==
Asgari has served on the juries of several international film festivals. In 2022, he was a member of the International Competition jury at the 41st Istanbul Film Festival.

In 2024, he served on the international jury of the Feature Film Competition at the Festival del Cinema Africano, d'Asia e America Latina in Milan, the Short Film Competition jury at the 40th Warsaw Film Festival, and the Orizzonti jury at the 81st Venice International Film Festival.

In 2025, he served on the Feature Film Competition jury of the 21st Zurich Film Festival, the Rebels With a Cause Competition jury at the 29th Tallinn Black Nights Film Festival, and the Frontier Competition jury at the 17th DMZ International Documentary Film Festival.

In 2026, he served on the Short Films and La Cinef Jury at the 79th Cannes Film Festival and on the Burning Lights Competition jury at Visions du Réel.
