= 70th Locarno Film Festival =

Film festival in Locarno, Switzerland

- Opening film: Tomorrow and Thereafter directed by Noémie Lvovsky
- Closing film: Gotthard – One Life, One Soul directed by Kevin Merz
- Location: Locarno, Switzerland
- Founded: 1946
- Awards: Golden Leopard: Mrs. Fang directed by Wang Bing
- Hosted by: Associazione Festival del film Locarno
- Festival date: Opening: 2 August 2017; Closing: 12 August 2017
- Website: LFF Website

Locarno Film Festival
- 71st 69th

The 70th Locarno Film Festival was held from 2 to 12 August 2017 in Locarno, Switzerland. The festival's opening film was Tomorrow and Thereafter (Demain et tous les autres jours) directed by Noémie Lvovsky. The closing film was Gotthard – One Life, One Soul directed by Kevin Merz.

The Golden Leopard, the festival's top prize, was awarded to the documentary film Mrs. Fang directed by Wang Bing.

== Juries ==
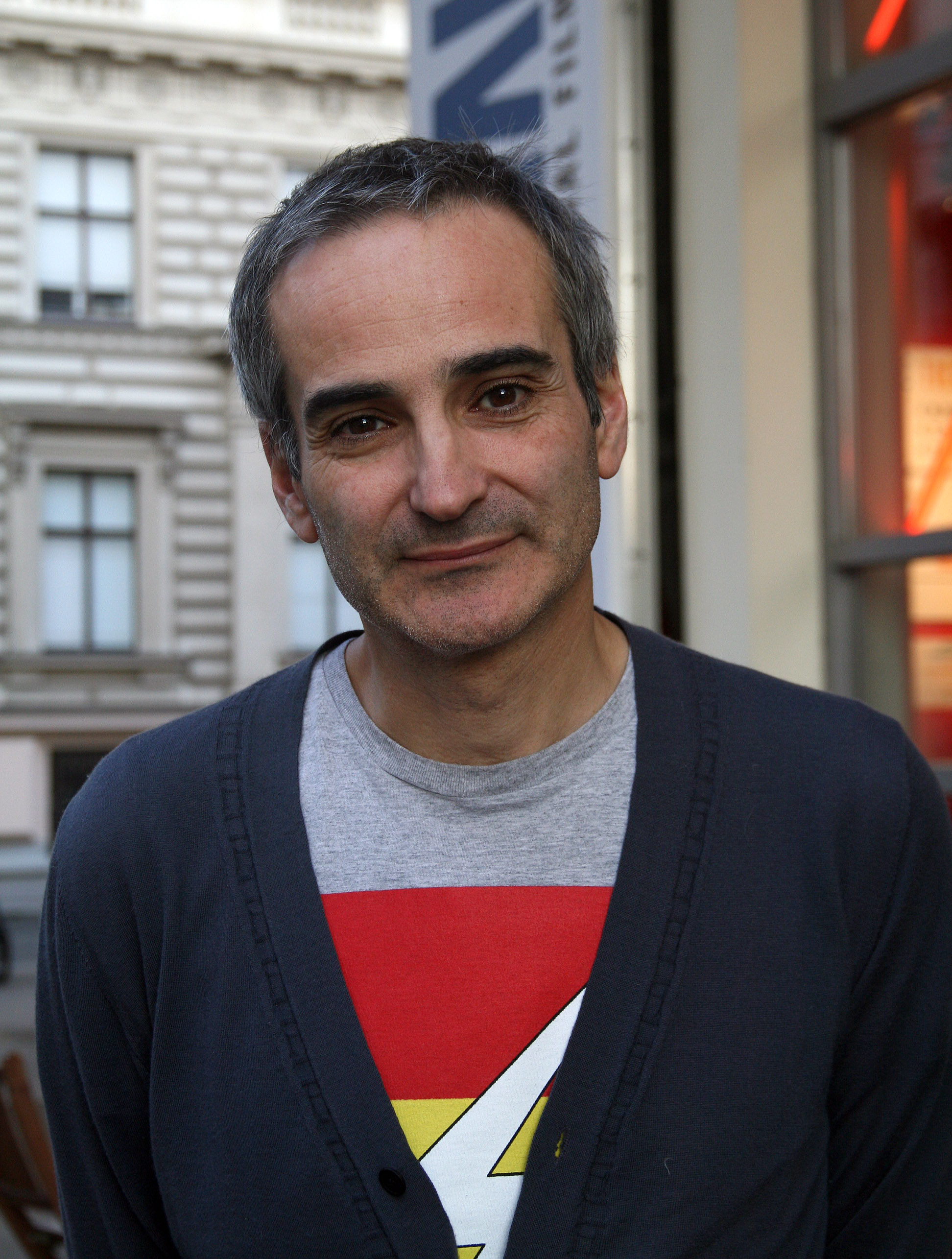
Olivier Assayas, international competition jury president

=== International Competition ===
- Olivier Assayas, French filmmaker and film critic - Jury President
- Jean-Stéphane Bron, Swiss actor and filmmaker
- Miguel Gomes, Portuguese filmmaker
- Christos Konstantakopoulos, Greek producer and writer
- Birgit Minichmayr, Austrian actress

=== Filmmakers of the Present (Concorso Cineasti del presente) ===
- Yousry Nasrallah, Egyptian filmmaker - Jury President
- Matías Piñeiro, Argentinian director
- Katrin Pors, Danish film producer
- Johanna ter Steege, Dutch actress
- Paola Turci, Italian composer

=== Leopards of Tomorrow ===
- Sabine Azéma, French actress and director - Jury President

== Official Sections ==
The following films were screened in the sections below:

Piazza Grande: Prefestival

Original title	English title	Director(s)	Year	Production country
Due Soldati	Two Soldiers	Marco Tullio Giordana	2017	Italy
Goldfinger		Guy Hamilton	1964	United Kingdom
Scarlatti K. 259		Marco Tullio Giordana	2017	Italy

=== Piazza Grande ===
English Title	Original title	Director(s)	Production Country
Atomic Blonde		David Leitch	United States
The Big Sick		Michael Showalter	United States
Dog	Chien	Samuel Benchetrit	France, Belgium
Drei Zinnen		Jan Zabeil	Germany, Italy
Good Time		Ben Safdie and Joshua Safdie	United States
Gotthard - One Life, One Soul		Kevin Merz	Switzerland
I Walked with a Zombie (1943)		Jacques Tourneur	United States
Iceman		Felix Randau	Germany, Italy, Austria
Let the Corpses Tan	Laissez Bronzer Les Cadavres	Hélène Cattet and Bruno Forzani	Belgium, France
Lola Pater		Nadir Moknèche	France, Belgium
Sicilia! (1999)		Jean-Marie Straub and Danièle Huillet	Italy, France, Germany
The Song of Scorpions		Anup Singh	Switzerland, France, Singapore
Sparring		Samuel Jouy	France
Stories of Love That Cannot Belong to This World	Amori Che Non Sanno Stare Al Mondo	Francesca Comencini	Italy
Tomorrow and Thereafter	Demain et Tous les Autres Jours	Noémie Lvovsky	France
What Happened to Monday		Tommy Wirkola	United Kingdom, United States, France, Belgium

=== International Competition (Concorso internazionale) ===
English Title	Original title	Director(s)	Production Country
Charleston		Andreï Cretulescu	Romania, France
Did You Wonder Who Fired The Gun?		Travis Wilkerson	United States
Dragonfly Eyes	Qing Ting Zhi Yan	Xu Bing	China, United States
En el séptimo día		Jim McKay	United States
9 Fingers	9 Doigts	F.J. Ossang	France
Freiheit		Jan Speckenbach	Germany, Slovakia
Gemini		Aaron Katz	United States
Gli Asteroidi		Germano Maccioni	Italy
Goliath		Dominik Locher	Switzerland
Good Luck		Ben Russell	France, Germany
Good Manners	As Boas Maneiras	Juliana Rojas and Marco Dutra	Brazil, France
Lucky		John Carroll Lynch	United States
Madame Hyde		Serge Bozon	France, Belgium
Mrs. Fang	方绣英	Wang Bing	France, China, Germany
A Skin So Soft	Ta peau si lisse	Denis Côté	Canada, Switzerland
Wajib	واجب	Annemarie Jacir	Palestine, Qatar, United Arab Emirates
The Wandering Soap Opera	La telenovela errante	Raúl Ruiz and Valeria Sarmiento	Chile

=== Filmmakers of the Present (Concorso Cineasti del presente) ===
English Title	Original title	Director(s)	Production Country
3/4		Ilian Metev	Bulgaria, Germany
Beach Rats		Eliza Hittman	United States
Damned Summer	Verão Danado	Pedro Cabeleira	Portugal
Distant Constellation		Shevaun Mizrahi	United States, Turkey, Netherlands
Easy		Andrea Magnani	Italy, Ukraine
Farewell To The Parents	Abschied Von Den Eltern	Astrid Johanna Ofner	Austria
The First Lap	초행	Kim Dae-hwan	Korea
Le Fort des Fous		Narimane Mari	France, Qatar
Il Monte Delle Formiche		Riccardo Palladino	Italy
Meteorlar		Gürcan Keltek	Netherlands, Turkey
Person to Person		Dustin Guy Defa	United States
Scary Mother	საშიში დედა	Ana Urushadze	Georgia, Estonia
Sweating the Small Stuff	Edaha No Koto	Ryûtarô Ninomiya	Japan
Those Who Are Fine	Dene Wos Guet Geit	Cyril Schäublin	Switzerland

=== Leopards of Tomorrow (Pardi di domani) ===
==== International competition (Concorso internazionale) ====
Highlighted title indicates Leopard of Tomorrow winner

English Title	Original title	Director(s)	Country
Ella's Men	Agvarim Shel Ella	Oren Adaf	Israel
António E Catarina		Cristina Haneș	Portugal
Armageddon 2		Corey Hughes	Cuba
Boomerang		David Bouttin	France
British By The Grace Of God		Sean Robert Dunn	United Kingdom/USA/UnitedArab Emirates
Crossing River		Yumeng Han	China
Das Satanische Dickicht – Drei		Willy Hans	Germany
Douggy		Matvey Fiks	USA/Russia
Edge Of Alchemy		Stacey Steers	USA
Fine Di Un Amore		Alberto Tamburelli	Italy
Graduation`97	Vypusk ’97	Pavlo Ostrikov	Ukraine
Black Clothes	Haine Negre	Octav Chelaru	Romania
Harbour		Stefanie Kolk	Netherlands
Jeunes Hommes À La Fenêtre		Loukianos Moshonas	France
Kapitalistis		Pablo Muñoz Gomez	Belgium/France
Loop		Matija Gluscevic	Serbia
Los Perros De Amundsen		Rafael Ramírez	Cuba
Gaze	Negah	Farnoosh Samadi	Iran
Nobody Here	Nikog Nema	Jelena Gavrilović	Serbia
Palenque		Sebastián Pinzón Silva	Colombia/USA
Plus Ultra		Helena Girón, Samuel M. Delgado	Spain
Shmama		Miki Polonski	Israel
Signature		Kei Chikaura	Japan
Silica		Pia Borg	Australia/United Kingdom
Song X		Mont Tesprateep	Thailand
Wasteland No. 1: Ardent, Verdant		Jodie Mack	USA
Life Story Of My Friend	Zhizn’ Moego Druga	Alexander Zolotukhin	Russia

==== National competition (Concorso nazionale) ====
Highlighted title indicates Leopard of Tomorrow winner

Original Title	Title	Director(s)	Country
59 Secondes	59 Seconds	Mauro Carraro	Switzerland
A Song from the Future		Tommaso Donati	Switzerland
Kuckuck		Aline Höchli	Switzerland
La Femme Canon	The Canon Woman	David Toutevoix, Albertine Zullo	Switzerland
Les Histoires Vraies	True Stories	Lucien Monot	Switzerland
Les Intranquilles	Intranquilles	Magdalena Froger	Switzerland
Parades		Sarah Arnold	France
Resistance		Laurence Favre	Switzerland
Rewind Forward		Justin Stoneham	Switzerland
Und Alles Fällt	And Everything Falls	Nadine Schwitter	Germany
Villa Ventura		Roman Hüben	Switzerland

=== Signs of Life ===
Original title	English title	Director(s)	Production country
Aliens		Luis López Carrasco	Spain
Cocote		Nelson Carlo De Los Santos Arias	Repubblica Dominicana
Era Uma Vez Brasília	Once Upon a Time Brasilia	Adirley Queirós	Brazil
Filmus	Films	Clément Safra	France
In Praise of Nothing		Boris Mitic	Serbia
Ouroboros		Basma Alsharif	France
Panoptic		Rana Eid	Lebanon
Phantasiesätze	Fantasy Sentences	Dane Komljen	Germany
Surbiles		Giovanni Columbu	Italia
Zirdziņ, Hallo!	Horse, Hallo!	Laila Pakalnina, Laila Pakalniņa	Latvia
Țara Moartă	The Dead Country	Radu Jude	Romania

=== Open Doors Screenings ===
Open Doors Screenings - Features
Original Title	English title	Director(s)	Year	Country
28		Prasanna Jayakody	2014	Sri Lanka
A Girl in the River: The Price of Forgiveness		Sharmeen Obaid-Chinoy	2015	Pakistan/USA
Namai Ba Rahis Gomhor	A Letter To The President	Roya Sadat	2017	Afghanistan
Davena Vihagun	Burning Birds	Sanjeewa Pushpakumara	2016	Sri Lanka/France/Netherlands/Qatar
Earth And Ashes		Atiq Rahimi	2004	Afghanistan/France
Jeewan Hathi	Elephant In The Room	Meenu Gaur & Farjad Nabi	2016	Pakistan/India
Khamosh Pani	Silent Waters	Sabiha Sumar	2003	Pakistan/France/Germany
Osama		Siddiq Barmak	2003	Afghanistan/Japan/Ireland
Sulanga Enu Pinisa (The Forsaken Land)	The Forsaken Land	Vimukthi Jayasundara	2005	Sri Lanka/France
Open Doors Screenings - Shorts
Original title	English title	Director(s)	Year	Country
Amir & Sara		Jalal Hussaini	2014	Afghanistan
Finding Zalmay		Sami Hasib Nabizada	2012	Afghanistan
Home		Zainab Entezar	2015	Afghanistan
Dar Charkha (In Circle)	In Circle	Masooma Ibrahimi	2014	Afghanistan
In Search Of		Daniel Asadi Faezi	2017	Pakistan
Mata Nam Ahuna	While You Slept	Nadya Perera	2015	Sri Lanka
Katada Ayiti	My Mother's Money	Suranga Katugampala	2014	Sri Lanka
Poshak	Facade	Iram Parveen Bilal	2011	Pakistan
Mouna Vizhiththuligal (	Silent Tears	Ilango Ramanathan	2014	Sri Lanka
Swap		Sayed Masood Eslami	2014	Afghanistan
Vice Versa One		Shahrbanoo Sadat	2010	Afghanistan

=== Out of Competition (Fuori Concorso) ===
Out of Competition (Fuori Concorso) – Feature Films
Original Title	English Title	Director(s)	Year	Production country
Acta Non Verba	Not Words	Yvann Yagchi	2017	Switzerland
Anatomia Del Miracolo	Anatomy of the Miracle	Alessandra Celesia	2017	France
Azmaish	Trial	Sabiha Sumar	2017	Pakistan
Choisir À Vingt Ans	Choose at Twenty	Villi Hermann	2017	Switzerland
Contes De Juillet	July Tales	Guillaume Brac	2017	France
Filles Du Feu	Fire Girls	Stéphane Breton	2017	France
Grandeur Et Décadence D'Un Petit Commerce De Cinéma	Greatness and Decadence of a Small Cinema Trade	Jean-Luc Godard	1986	France
Ibi	Place	Andrea Segre	2017	Italia
Le Vénérable W.	The Venerable W.	Barbet Schroeder	2017	France
Nazidanie		Aleksandr Shein, Boris Yukhananov	2017	Russia
Nothingwood		Sonia Kronlund	2017	France
Nous Sommes Jeunes Et Nos Jours Sont Longs	We are Young and Our Days are Long	Cosme Castro, Léa Forest	2017	France
Piazza Grande		Michael Beltrami, Misha Gyorik	2017	Switzerland
Pietra Tenera	Tender Stone	Aurélie Mertenat	2017	Switzerland
Prototype		Blake Williams	2017	Canada
Sand Und Blut	Sand and Blood	Matthias Krepp, Angelika Spangel	2017	Austria
The Reagan Show		Sierra Pettengill, Pacho Velez	2017	USA
Willkommen In Der Schweiz	Welcome to Switzerland	Sabine Gisiger	2017	Switzerland
Shorts - Out of Competition (Fuori Concorso)
Original title	English title	Director(s)	Year	Production country
A Manifesto for the Un-Communal		Syllas Tzoumerkas	2017	Germany
Arrière-Saison	A Great-Season	Jean-Claude Rousseau	2016	France
Granma		Daniele Gaglianone, Alfie Nze	2017	Italia
O Homem De Trás-Os-Montes	The Man from Trás-Os-Montes	Miguel Moraes Cabral	2017	Portugal
Per Una Rosa	For a Rose	Marco Bellocchio	2017	Italia
Scaffold		Kazik Radwanski	2017	Canada
Si Loin, Si Proche	So Far Away, so Close	Jean-Claude Rousseau	2016	France
Tshweesh	Tweesh	Feyrouz Serhal	2017	Lebanon
Out of Competition: Art Basel
Immortality for All: A Film Trilogy on Russian Cosmism		Anton Vidokle		Kazakhstan

=== History (s) of cinema (Histoire(s) du cinéma) ===
==== Pardo d’onore Manor to Jean-Marie Straub ====
Title	Director(s)	Country	Year
Cézanne, Dialogue Avec Joachim Gasquet	Straub–Huillet	France	1989
Dalla Nube Alla Resistenza	Straub–Huillet	Italy/Federal Republic of Germany (FRG)/United Kingdom/France	1979
Der Bräutigam, Die Komödiantin Und Der Zuhälter	Jean-Marie Straub	Federal Republic of Germany (FRG)	1968
En Rachâchant	Straub–Huillet	France	1982
Incantati	Straub–Huillet	France	2003
Klassenverhältnisse	Straub–Huillet	Federal Republic of Germany (FRG)/France	1984
Kommunisten	Jean-Marie Straub	France/Switzerland	2014
L’Aquarium Et La Nation	Jean-Marie Straub	France/ Switzerland	2015
La Guerre D’Algérie!	Jean-Marie Straub	France/Switzerland	2014
Une Visite Au Louvre	Straub–Huillet	France/Germany/Italy	2004
Von Heute Auf Morgen	Straub–Huillet	France/Germany	1996

==== Leopard of Honor to Todd Haynes (Pardo d’onore Manor_ ====
Title	Director(s)	Country	Year
Far from Heaven	Todd Haynes	USA/France	2003
Velvet Goldmine	Todd Haynes	United Kingdom/USA	1998
Wonderstruck	Todd Haynes	USA	2017

==== Locarno70 ====
Locarno70
English title	Original title	Director(s)	Year	Production country
36 Fillette		Catherine Breillat	1988	France
The Night of Counting the Years	Al-Momia	Shadi Abdel Salam	1969	Egypt
The Seventh Continent	Der Siebente Kontinent	Michael Haneke	1989	Austria
El Pisito		Marco Ferreri, Isidoro M. Ferry	1958	Spain
Hallelujah the Hills		Adolfas Mekas	1963	USA
Lion Sign	Le Signe Du Lion	Éric Rohmer	1962	France
The Lonely Voice of a Person	Odinokiy Golos Cheloveka	Alexander Sokurov	1987	ex URSS
Poison		Todd Haynes	1991	USA
San Gottardo		Villi Hermann	1977	Switzerland
Three Sad Tigers	Tres Tristes Tigres	Raúl Ruiz	1968	Chile
I Would Like an Hour	Un'Ora Sola Ti Vorrei	Alina Marazzi	2002	Italia

==== Tributes to ====
Hommage to George Romero
English title	Original title	Director(s)	Year	Production country
Dawn of the Dead		George A. Romero	1978	USA
Hommage to Hans Hurch
Ordet		Carl Theodor Dreyer	1955	Denmark
Hommage to Jeanne Moreau
Jules and Jim	Jules Et Jim	François Truffaut	1962	France
Hommage to Nastassja Kinski
Cat People		Paul Schrader	1981	USA
Paris, Texas		Wim Wenders	1984	Great Britain

==== Award Screenings ====
History (s) of Cinema: Excellence Award Moët & Chandon Mathieu Kassovitz
English title	Original title	Director(s)	Year	Production country
Munich		Steven Spielberg	2005	France
A Very Discreet Hero	Un Héros Très Discret	Jacques Audiard	1996	France
Leopard Club Award Adrien Brody
The Pianist		Roman Polanski	2002	France
The Thin Red Line		Terrence Malick	1998	USA
Raimondo Rezzonico Michel Merkt Award (Premio)
Frost		Šarūnas Bartas	2017	Lithuania
Maps to the Stars		David Cronenberg	2014	Canada
Strong Island		Yance Ford	2017	USA
Ticino Esmé Sciaroni Cinema Award
Crazy Joy	La Pazza Gioia	Paolo Virzì	2016	Italia
Vision Award Ticinomoda José Luis Alcaine
Beautiful Era	Belle Époque	Fernando Trueba	1992	Spain
The Skin I Live	La Piel Que Habito	Pedro Almodóvar	2011	Spain
Women on the Verge of a Nervous Attack	Mujeres Al Borde De Un Ataque De Nervios	Pedro Almodóvar	1988	Spain
	Passion	Brian De Palma	2012	France

=== Locarno Kids ===
Title	Director(s)	Country
Johan Padan A La Descoverta De Le Americhe	Giulio Cingoli	Italy
Zombillénium	Arthur de Pins, Alexis Ducord	France/Belgium

=== Retrospettiva – Jacques Tourneur ===
Title	Director(s)	Year	Country
All That's Not Worth Love (Tout Ça Ne Vaut Pas L’Amour)	Jacques Tourneur	1931	France
Toto	Jacques Tourneur	1933	France
To Be Loved (Pour Être Aimé)	Jacques Tourneur	1933	France
The Concierge's Daughters (Les Filles De La Concierge	Jacques Tourneur	1934	France
Killer Dog	Jacques Tourneur	1936	USA
What Do You Think?	Jacques Tourneur	1937	USA
The Man In The Barn	Jacques Tourneur	1937	USA
The King Without A Crown	Jacques Tourneur	1937	USA
The Grand Bounce	Jacques Tourneur	1937	USA
Romance of Radium	Jacques Tourneur	1937	USA
The Ship That Died	Jacques Tourneur	1938	USA
The Face Behind The Mask	Jacques Tourneur	1938	USA
Yankee Doodle Goes To Town	Jacques Tourneur	1939	USA
They All Come Out	Jacques Tourneur	1939	USA
Nick Carter, Master Detective	Jacques Tourneur	1939	USA
Phantom Raiders	Jacques Tourneur	1940	USA
Doctors Don't Tell	Jacques Tourneur	1941	USA
The Magic Alphabet	Jacques Tourneur	1942	USA
The Incredible Stranger	Jacques Tourneur	1942	USA
Cat People	Jacques Tourneur	1942	USA
The Leopard Man	Jacques Tourneur	1943	USA
Reward Unlimited	Jacques Tourneur	1944	USA
Experiment Perilous	Jacques Tourneur	1944	USA
Days of Glory	Jacques Tourneur	1944	USA
Canyon Passage	Jacques Tourneur	1946	USA
Out of the Past	Jacques Tourneur	1947	USA
Berlin Express	Jacques Tourneur	1948	USA
Easy Living	Jacques Tourneur	1949	USA
The Flame and the Arrow	Jacques Tourneur	1950	USA
Stars in My Crown	Jacques Tourneur	1950	USA
Circle of Danger	Jacques Tourneur	1951	United Kingdom
Anne of the Indies	Jacques Tourneur	1951	USA
Way of a Gaucho	Jacques Tourneur	1952	USA
Appointment in Honduras	Jacques Tourneur	1953	USA
Wichita	Jacques Tourneur	1955	USA
Stranger on Horseback	Jacques Tourneur	1955	USA
Great Day in the Morning	Jacques Tourneur	1956	USA
Nightfall	Jacques Tourneur	1957	USA
Night of the Demon	Jacques Tourneur	1957	United Kingdom
Timbuktu	Jacques Tourneur	1958	USA
The Fearmakers	Jacques Tourneur	1958	USA
The Giant of Marathon (La Battaglia Di Maratona)	Jacques Tourneur, Mario Bava, Bruno Vailati	1959	Italy/France
Frontier Rangers	Jacques Tourneur	1959	USA
The Comedy of Terrors	Jacques Tourneur	1963	USA
The Twilight Zone: Night Call	Jacques Tourneur	1964	USA
War-Gods Of The Deep (City Under The Sea)	Jacques Tourneur	1965	United Kingdom/USA

=== Panorama Suisse ===
Title	English title	Director(s)	Country
A Campaign of Their Own		Lionel Rupp	Switzerland
Airport		Michaela Müller	Switzerland/Croatia
Almost There		Jacqueline Zünd	Switzerland
Das Mädchen Vom Änziloch	The Girl from the Änziloch	Alice Schmid	Switzerland
Die Göttliche Ordnung	The Divine Order	Petra Volpe	Switzerland
Finsteres Glück	Dark Luck	Stefan Haupt	Switzerland
L'Opéra De Paris	The Paris Opera	Jean-Stéphane Bron	France/Switzerland
La Fureur De Voir	The Fury to See	Manuel von Stürler	Switzerland/France
Miséricorde	Mercy	Fulvio Bernasconi	Switzerland/Canada
Unerhört Jenisch	Outrageous Jenisch	Karoline Arn, Martina Rieder	Switzerland

==== Swiss Cinema Rediscovered ====
Swiss Cinema Rediscovered
English title	Original title	Director(s)	Year	Production country
The Congress of the Penguins	Der Kongress Der Pinguine	Hans-Ulrich Schlumpf	1993	Switzerland
Little Freedom	Kleine Freiheit	Hans-Ulrich Schlumpf	1978	Switzerland

== Independent Sections ==
=== Critics Week ===
The Semaine de la Critique is an independent section, created in 1990 by the Swiss Association of Film Journalists in partnership with the Locarno Film Festival.

Original title	English title	Director(s)	Production country
Blood Amber		Yong Chao Lee	Taiwan
Das Kongo Tribunal	Das Congo Tribunal	Milo Rau	Switzerland
Družina	Family	Rok Biček	Slovenia
Favela Olímpica	Olympic Slum	Samuel Chalard	Switzerland
Las Cinéphilas	Cinephilas	María Alvarez	Argentina
Señorita María, La Falda De La Montaña	Miss Maria, the Mountain Skirt	Rubén Mendoza	Colombia
The Poetess		Stefanie Brockhaus, Andreas Wolff	Germany

== Official Awards ==
The following awards were presented for films shown in competition:

=== Concorso internazionale ===
- Pardo d’oro: Mrs. Fang directed by Wang Bing
- Premio Speciale Della Giuria (Special Jury Prize): As Boas Maneiras directed by Juliana Rojas and Marco Dutra, Brazil, France
- Pardo per la Miglior Regia (Best Direction): F. J. Ossang for 9 Doigts, France, Portugal
- Pardo per la Miglior Interpretazione Femminile (Best Actress): Isabelle Huppert for Madame Hyde directed by Serge Bozon, France, Belgium
- Pardo per la Miglior Interpretazione Maschile (Best Actor): Elliott Crosset Hove for Vinterbrødre directed by Hlynur Pálmason, Denmark, Iceland

=== Concorso Cineasti del presente ===
- Pardo d’Oro Cineasti del Presente: 3/4 (Three Quarters) directed by Ilian Metev, Bulgaria, Germany
- Premio Speciale della Giuria Ciné+ Cineasti del Presente (Special Jury Prize): Milla directed by Valerie Massadian, France, Portugal
- Premio per il Miglior Regista Emergente – Città e Regione di Locarno (Prize for the Best Emerging Director): Kim Dae-Hwan for Cho-haeng (The First Lap), South Korea
- Special Mention: Distant Constellation directed by Shevaun Mizrahi, USA, Turkey, Netherlands
- Special Mention: Verão Danado directed by Pedro Cabeleira, Portugal

=== Signs of Life ===
- Signs of Life Award electronic-art.foundation for Best Film: Cocote directed by Nelson Carlo De Los Santos Arias, Dominican Republic, Argentina, Germany, Qatar
- Fondación Casa Wabi – Mantarraya Award: Dane Komljen for Phantasiesätze, Germany, Denmark
- Special Mention: Era uma vez Brasília (Once there was Brazil) directed by Adirley Queirós, Brazil, Portugal

=== First Feature ===
- Swatch First Feature Award (Prize for Best First Feature): Scary Mother directed by Ana Urushadze, Georgia, Estonia
- Swatch Art Peace Hotel Award: Meteorlar (Meteors) directed by Gürcan Keltek, Netherlands, Turkey
- Special Mention: Dene wos guet geit (Those Who Are Fine) directed by Cyril Schäublin, Switzerland

=== Pardi di domani ===
==== Concorso Internazionale ====
- Pardino d’Oro for the Best International Short Film – Premio SRG SSR: António e Catarina directed by Cristina Hanes, Portugal
- Pardino d’Argento SRG SSR for the Concorso Internazionale: Shmama directed by Miki Polonski, Israel
- Locarno Nomination for the European Film Awards – Premio Pianifica: Jeunes Hommes à la Fenêtre (Young Men at their Window) directed by Loukianos Moshonas, France
- Medien Patent Verwaltung AG Award: Kapitalistis directed by Pablo Muñoz Gomez, Belgium, France
- Special Mention: Armageddon 2 directed by Corey Hughes, Cuba

==== Concorso Nazionale ====
- Pardino d’Oro for the Best Swiss Short Film – Premio Swiss Life: Rewind Forward directed by Justin Stoneham, Switzerland
- Pardino d’Argento Swiss Life for the Concorso Nazionale: 59 Secondes directed by Mauro Carraro, Switzerland
- Best Swiss Newcomer Award: Les Intranquilles directed by Magdalena Froger, Switzerland

=== Prix du Public UBS ===
- Prix du Public UBS: The Big Sick directed by Michael Showalter, USA

=== Variety Piazza Grande Award ===
- Variety Piazza Grande Award: Three Peaks directed by Jan Zabeil, Germany, Italy
