= Youth (disambiguation) =

Youth is a period of life. It is also a slang term for an adolescent, especially a boy.

Youth may also refer to:

== Film and television ==
- Youth (1917 film), an American silent drama directed by Romaine Fielding
- Youth (1922 film), a German film directed by Fred Sauer
- Youth (1934 film), a French film directed by Georges Lacombe
- Youth (1977 film), a Chinese film directed by Xie Jin
- Youth (2002 film), an Indian Tamil-language film directed by Vincent Selva
- Youth (2005 film), an Indian Telugu-language film starring Vikram
- Youth (2013 film), an Israeli-German film by Tom Shoval
- Youth (2015 film), a film by Paolo Sorrentino
- Youth (2016 film), an Indian Marathi-language film starring Neha Mahajan
- Youth (2017 film), a Chinese film directed by Feng Xiaogang
- Youth (2026 film), an Indian Tamil-language film directed by Ken Karunas
- Youth, a documentary film trilogy directed by Wang Bing
  - Youth (Spring), 2023
  - Youth (Hard Times), 2024
  - Youth (Homecoming), 2024
- Youth (TV series), a 2026 American television series on HBO by Sharon Horgan
- Begins ≠ Youth, a South Korean series based on BTS
- Youth (Chinese TV series), a 2018 remake of the South Korean series Hello, My Twenties!

== Literature ==
- Youth (Asimov short story), a 1952 science fiction story by Isaac Asimov
- Youth (Conrad short story), an 1898 short story by Joseph Conrad
- Youth, A Narrative; and Two Other Stories, a 1902 story collection by Joseph Conrad
- Youth (Tolstoy novel), an 1857 novel by Leo Tolstoy
- Youth: Scenes from Provincial Life II, a 2002 novel by J. M. Coetzee
- Youth, an 1881 melodrama by Augustus Harris and Paul Meritt
- Youth, a short play by Thornton Wilder
- "Youth", a poem by Samuel Ullman

== Music ==
=== Albums ===
- Youth (BTS album), 2016
- Youth (Citizen album), 2013
- Youth (Collective Soul album), 2004
- Youth (Matisyahu album) or the title song, 2006
- Youth (Tinie Tempah album) or the title song, 2017
- Youth!, by Glen Check, 2013
- Youth, by Wild Cub, 2013

=== EPs ===
- Youth (Dabro EP), 2020
- Youth (Kihyun EP) or the title song, 2022
- Youth (WEi EP), 2022
- Youth, by Luminous, 2021

=== Songs and compositions ===
- Youth (wind sextet), a chamber composition by Leoš Janáček, 1924
- "Youth" (Foxes song), 2013
- "Youth" (Shawn Mendes song), 2018
- "Youth" (Troye Sivan song), 2015
- "Youth", by Band-Maid from Unseen World, 2021
- "Youth", by Daughter from The Wild Youth, 2011
- "Youth", by Feeder from Tallulah, 2019
- "Youth", by Glass Animals from How to Be a Human Being, 2016
- "Youth", by Soft Cell from Non-Stop Erotic Cabaret, 1981
- "Youth", by Stray Kids from Hop, 2024
- "Youth", by Sully Burrows from Somewhere in a Small Town, 2024

== People ==
- Big Youth (born 1949), Jamaican deejay
- Youth (musician) (born 1960), British record producer and musician in the band Killing Joke
- Todd Youth (1970–2018), American guitarist

== Sculpture ==
- Youth (Henrion), or Standing Girl, a 1951 sculpture by Daphne Hardy Henrion in London, United Kingdom
- Youth (Johnson), or The Spirit of Spanish Music, a 1916 sculpture by Burt Johnson at Pomona College, California, U.S.
- Youth (Zet), a 1965 bronze sculpture by Miloš Zet in Prague, Czech Republic

== Sports ==
- Youth (athletics), or Under-18 athletics, an athletics age category
- Youth (horse) (foaled 1973), American-bred French Thoroughbred racehorse

== Other uses ==
- Youth, Georgia, United States
- Youth.gov, the website of the Interagency Working Group on Youth Programs, a U.S. government organization
- Tuổi Trẻ (lit. Youth), a Vietnamese newspaper

== See also ==
- The Youth (disambiguation)
- Index of youth articles
