= The Ditch =

- International promotional poster
- Directed by: Wang Bing
- Written by: Wang Bing
- Based on: Goodbye, Jiabiangou by Yang Xianhui
- Produced by: Wang Bing; Lihong K.; Hui Mao; Francisco Villa-Lobos
- Starring: Ye Lu; Renjun Lian; Cenzi Xu; Haoyu Yang
- Cinematography: Lu Sheng
- Edited by: Marie-Helene Dozo
- Production companies: Wil Productions; Les Films de L'Etranger; Entre Chien et Loup; CineMart; Cinéfondation; Ministere des Affaires Etrangères et Européennes; Ministre de la Culture et de l'Éducation Nationale; Pusan Promotion Plan
- Distributed by: Capricci Films (France)
- Release dates: 6 September 2010 (Venice); 14 March 2012 (France)
- Running time: 112 minutes
- Countries: China; Hong Kong; France; Belgium; South Korea; Netherlands
- Language: Mandarin

The Ditch
- Simplified Chinese: 夹边沟
Transcriptions
Standard Mandarin
- Hanyu Pinyin: Jiā biān gōu

Goodbye Jiabiangou
- Simplified Chinese: 告别夹边沟 / 再见夹边沟
Transcriptions
Standard Mandarin
- Hanyu Pinyin: Gàobié jiā biān gōu/ Zàijiàn jiā biān gōu

The Ditch (also known as Goodbye Jiabiangou) is a 2010 docudrama film produced, written and directed by Wang Bing, based on the novel Goodbye, Jiabiangou by Yang Xianhui. A reenactment of the forced labor camps called Jiabiangou during 1960's Maoist China, it focuses on the suffering of those imprisoned in the Gobi Desert after the Anti-Rightist Campaign, following the prisoners harsh life, who coped with physical exhaustion, extreme cold, starvation and death on a daily basis. It is one of the first films to tackle the subject.

The film had its world premiere at the main competition of the 67th Venice International Film Festival on 6 September 2010 as the film sorpresa, where it was nominated for the Golden Lion. It received positive reviews from critics.

In the following years, Wang Bing released three other documentaries on the subject: Traces (2014), Dead Souls (2018) and Beauty Lives in Freedom (2018), which were also met with critical acclaim.

== Plot ==
The background to the setting is Mao Zedong's disastrous Hundred Flowers Campaign from 1956 to 1957, during which Chinese intellectuals were advised to contribute their opinions on national policy issues. During the campaign, thousands of citizens were branded "right-wing deviants" for their criticism of the Communist Party, and were sentenced to forced labour. One such "deviant" in the film is a self-proclaimed party member since 1938. One professor says he has been imprisoned over semantics: saying he was detained for saying the phrase "dictatorship of the proletariat" was "too narrow" and suggesting it be replaced by "dictatorship of the people".

The basically plot-less story-line is set over a three-month period in 1960, at the Mingshui annex of Jiabiangou Re-education Camp. Most of the film was shot in a simple dugout – referred to as "Dormitory 8" – lined with bedding where the men live; in the daytime, they work on a giant desert project that covers 10,000 acres. They live on gruel, work until exhausted; many then die from the combined effects of extreme physical exhaustion, hostile climate and the great famine sweeping China. A new group of men arrives, are assigned to sleep in a miserable dugout and begin the long, slow process of dying. The work is intense, but dealing with hunger is the prisoners' and the film's main focus: shortage means that even rats are eaten; consumption of human corpses is not unheard of. Desperation drives one man to eat another's vomit. To make room for fresh arrivals, bodies of those who die are dragged out daily, wrapped in their bedclothes, and buried in shallow graves.

== Cast ==
- Ye Lu as Xiao Li
- Renjun Lian
- Cenzi Xu as Gu
- Haoyu Yang as Lao Dong

== Production ==
The film, based on Goodbye, Jiabiangou (English version translated as Woman from Shanghai: Tales of Survival from a Chinese Labor Camp), a book by Yang Xianhui about the life and toil of inmates sent to the Jiabiangou internment camp in the 1950s and 1960s, is one of the first films to deal directly with subject, which remains a political taboo. The director also interviewed camp survivors of Jiabiangou and of the Mingshui camp. The film describes the hunger and back-breaking work of the inmates, most of whom did not survive the internment (out of 3000-plus inmates, 2500 died in the camp). Fearing official prohibition, the film was shot on location in secret and without official authorisation; it was co-produced in Hong Kong, France and Belgium by Wang, K Lihong, Hui Mao, Philippe Avril, Francisco Villa-Lobos, Sebastien Delloye, Dianba Elbaum.

== Critical response ==
- "Lee Marshall of Screen International described the strategy of the drama was to be minimalist, whilst at the same time be "close to melodrama". He said that by "start[ing] off with a terrible situation and make it worse ... it [was] a stark, powerful but also unremittingly bleak work that plumbs the misery of what man can do to man in the name of an ideology."
- Deborah Young of AP, writing in The Hollywood Reporter, said "The filmmaking is most powerful as a document of the nightmarish conditions in the camp, where the starving men are led to the extremes of cannibalism. However, she criticised the film's much weaker dramatic structure, as it is "hard to distinguish individual prisoners, whose terrible stories tend to blend together. Only with the arrival of the wife do a few faces and personalities come into focus."
- Justin Chang of Variety said: "the sense of verisimilitude here is so strong that those walking in unawares may at first think they're watching another piece of [Wang's] highly observant reportage—never mind that no filmmaker would ever have been granted access, just as no humane documentarian could have kept the camera rolling without offering his subjects a scrap of food at the very least.
- Rober Breams at Obsessed With Film praised the film's high-end documentary aesthetic and said: "It is cinematic and classy, like a prestigious and artful documentary film. There is no music and a very realist use of sound design. It all feels authentic. Indeed, I suspect the only reason he made The Ditch as a work of fiction at all is due to the fact the reality is now impossible to film." However, he was critical of how the film dwelled (for 15 minutes) on the scene of a visiting wife who wailed inconsolably upon discovering that her husband had just died a few days before.

== See also ==
- Fengming, a Chinese Memoir
