= Jiabiangou =

Labour camp in Gansu, China

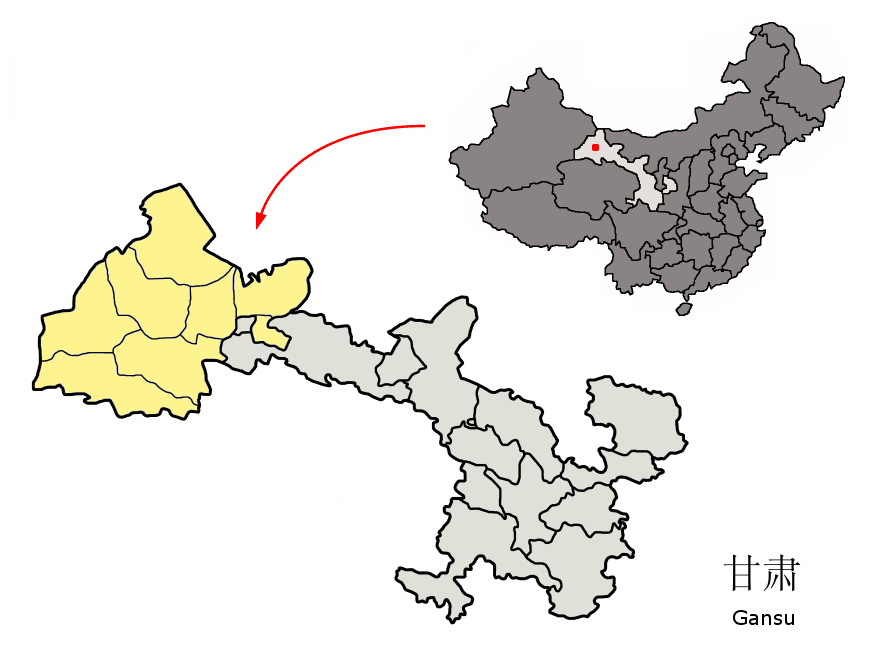
Jiuquan of Gansu Province, where the Jiabiangou labor camp was located.

Jiabiangou Labor Camp (Chinese: 夹边沟; pinyin: Jiābiāngōu; lit. 'wedged between ditches') is a former farm labor camp (laogai) located in the area under the administration of Jiuquan in the northwestern desert region of Gansu Province. The camp was in use during the Anti-Rightist Campaign in the years from 1957 to 1961. During its operation, it held approximately 3,000 political prisoners, of whom about 2,500 died at Jiabiangou, mostly of starvation.

== History ==
Jiabiangou was a camp for "re-education through labor" that was used to imprison intellectuals and former government officials who were declared to be "rightist" in the Anti-Rightist Movement of the PRC and Chinese Communist Party. The camp is located 27 kilometres (17 mi) to the northeast of Jiuquan, on the edge of the Badain Jaran Desert.

Some inmates were sent to Jiabiangou on the grounds that they had relatives who had owned a business or held a position in the Kuomintang government. Originally designed as a prison to hold 40 to 50 criminals, the camp was overcrowded with 3,000 political prisoners. As a consequence, agriculture in the camp area was limited to small patches of grassland in an oasis surrounded by salt marshes and desert. Yet, no external food supplies were offered to the prisoners.

The starvation at Jiabianguo took place during the Great Leap Forward (1958–1961) and the following Great Chinese Famine (1959–1962), which is estimated to have caused many millions of excess deaths. The result was a famine in Jiabiangou that started in the fall of 1960. In order to survive, prisoners ate leaves, tree barks, worms and rats, human and animal waste, and flesh from dead inmates. The bodies of the dead were left unburied on the sand dunes surrounding the camp as the surviving prisoners were too weak to bury them.

In December 1960, senior officials of the Communist Party learned of the situation in the camp and launched an investigation. As a result, amnesties were issued to the survivors and the camp's remaining population evacuated early in 1961. In October 1961, the government ordered the closure of Jiabiangou as well as a cover-up. Authorities in Gansu assigned a doctor to the fabrication of medical records for every dead inmate stating various natural causes of death, but never mentioning starvation.

== Memorial ==
Partially fictionalized accounts of firsthand recollections from 13 survivors of the camp have been presented in the book Woman from Shanghai: Tales of Survival From a Chinese Labor Camp by Yang Xianhui (originally published as "Farewell to Jiabiangou", Chinese: 告别夹边沟; pinyin: Gàobié Jiābiāngōu, translated into English by Wen Huang with support from a 2007 PEN Translation Fund Grant. The book was adapted into Wang Bing's 2010 film The Ditch. Another account based on interviews with survivors is given in The Tragedy at Jiabiangou by Xu Zhao (2008), Laogai Research Foundation Publications (in Chinese).

Remains of the camp, including the graveyards, are unmaintained and heavily guarded to prevent people from visiting. In November 2013, a new monument dictated by families and social workers was quickly destroyed by local authorities. Ai Xiaoming, a professor of Sun Yat-sen University, was briefly detained before released and prevented from photographing in May 2014.

== See also ==
- The Ditch
- Dead Souls
