= Wuhan, I Am Here =

2021 Lan Bo documentary

Wuhan, I Am Here (汉语: 武汉，我在) is a 2021 documentary film directed and written by Lan Bo, and produced by Archibald Pei. It records how a fiction film crew, unexpectedly detained in Wuhan due to the 2020 COVID-19 pandemic outbreak, followed local volunteers to save the non-COVID patients and ordinary citizens.

The film is a development on the director's 2020 short film Wuhan: The Long Night and was screened on Yamagata International Documentary Film Festival (YIDFF) 2021, as that year's only Special Invitation Film.

== Reception ==
"Our daily lives have been forever changed by the realities of the global COVID-19 pandemic. Wuhan, I Am Here sheds light on the reality that continues from 2020 to this day." —YIDFF Official Website
