= Chalam Bennurkar =

Indian film director

- Born: 1950s
- Died: 2017 (aged 62); Bagur, Karnataka
- Spouse: Kalpana Chakravarthy

Chalam Bennurkar (died 2017) was an Indian documentary film maker, film activist and director who is best known for his Tamil documentary film Children of Mini-Japan (Kutty Japanin Kuzhandaigal) which won the Citizens' Prize and Encouragement Prize in Yamagata International Documentary Film Festival and Golden Dove in International Leipzig Festival for Documentary and Animated Film (Germany), in the year 1991.

== Career ==
Chalam was a college drop out who worked as a signboard painter and became part of CIEDS Collective and Vimochana in Bangalore. He had initiated Janamadhyam, a screening network and production infrastructure for grassroots action while he was associated with CIEDS Collective and Vimochana. To encourage the independent documentary film makers in India he created Sakshi a platform for young filmmakers to showcase their work through Bangalore Film Society and Odessa in Kerala.

== Filmography ==
- Children of Mini-Japan
- All About My Famila
- Bishaar Blues
- On Latur
- Naavu Yeravaru

== Accolades ==
Chalam was awarded numerous accolades for his work. The most important ones are:

- Yamagata International Documentary Film Festival - 1991
- International Documentary and Short Film Festival of Kerala
- International Leipzig Festival for Documentary and Animated Film Award
