= Crude Oil (film) =

2008 Chinese film by Wang Bing

- Directed by: Wang Bing
- Edited by: Guo Hengqi
- Distributed by: Wil Productions
- Release date: January 2008 (International Film Festival Rotterdam)
- Running time: 840 minutes
- Countries: China; Netherlands
- Language: Mandarin

Crude Oil (simplified Chinese: 采油日记; traditional Chinese: 採油日記; pinyin: Cǎi yóu rì jì) is a 2008 Chinese documentary film directed by Wang Bing. Filmed in the Inner Mongolian portion of the Gobi Desert, it follows a group of oil field workers as they go about their daily routine.

Like Wang's debut feature—the nine-hour Tie Xi Qu: West of the Tracks—Crude Oil is notable for extreme length, running to 840 minutes (14 hours). The original plan called for a 70-hour film, but Wang felt compelled to exert additional editorial control and reduced the work to its present length. The director himself came down with severe altitude sickness and left the location three days into the one-week shoot; his crew completed the remainder without him.

Crude Oil premiered (in a video installation setting) at the 2008 International Film Festival Rotterdam, where it received a NETPAC "Special Mention" for "its dispassionate expose of the hardship of human labour which is the basis of economic progress." The project was commissioned by the IFFR, with additional support from the Hubert Bals Fund. It had its Asian premiere at the 2008 Hong Kong International Film Festival. Its North American premiere was at The Los Angeles Film Festival in June 2009, with screenings held in Gallery 6 at the Hammer Museum.

== See also ==
- List of longest films by running time
