= Anat Zuria =

Israeli independent film director

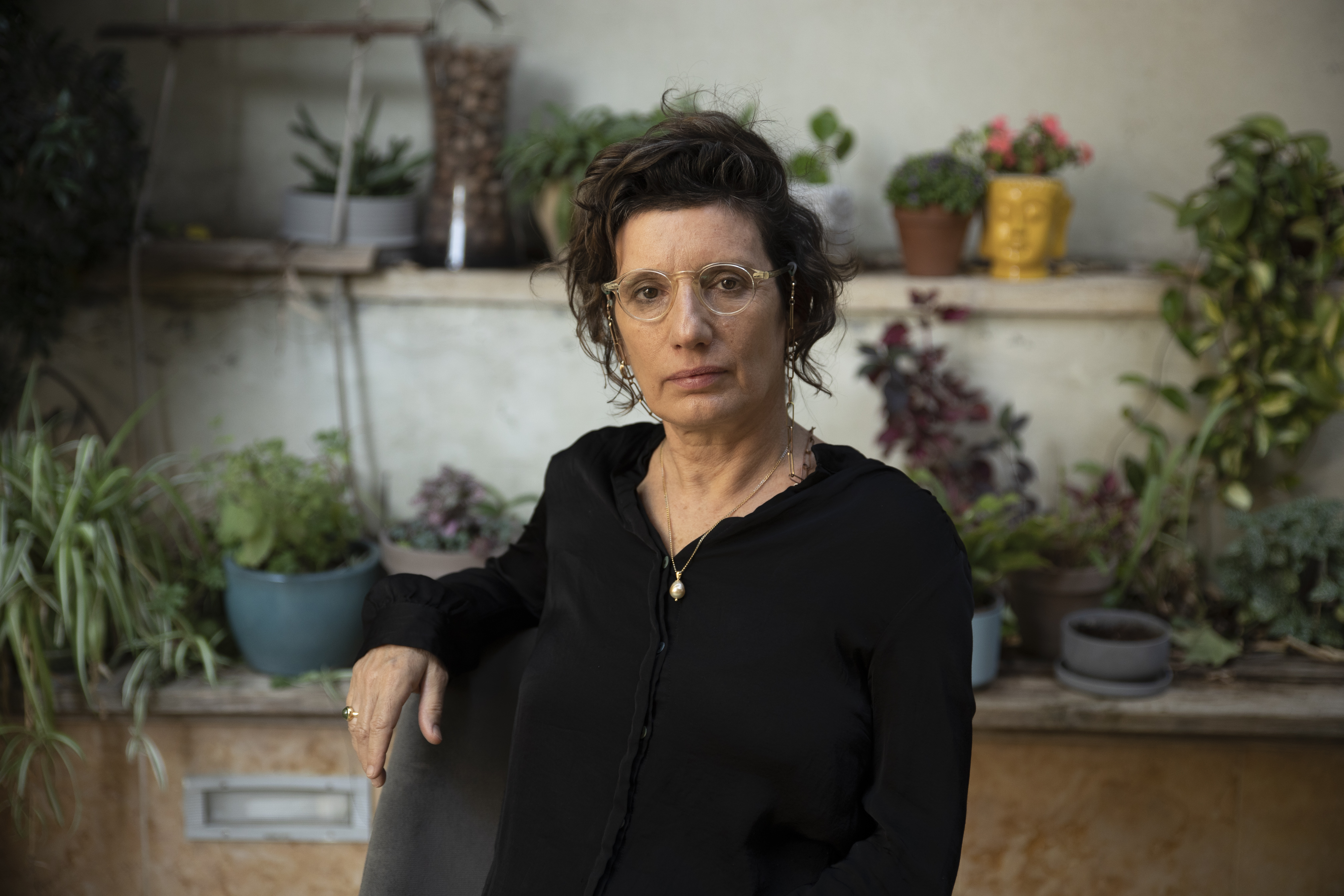
Anat Zuria in 2021.

Anat Zuria (Hebrew: ענת צוריה; born 1961) is an Israeli independent film director, creator of the films Purity, Sentenced to Marriage, Black Bus, The Lesson, Conventional Sins, and Reinvestigation.

== Filmography ==
Between 2002 and 2010 Zuria created a documentary trilogy, dealing with women's stories within the Jewish religious world. The three films all dealt with sexuality, independence and other social taboos which were never before documented in Israeli cinema.

The first film in the trilogy, Purity, tells the story of three religious women whose life and identity were challenged by the purity laws (niddah). The film exposes for the first time a feminist critical viewpoint on sexuality in Orthodox Judaism.

Sentenced to Marriage, the second film in the trilogy, is a documentary courtroom drama which takes place in the rabbinical courts in Israel. The film follows the story of three young women who struggled to get a get, a divorce, from their husbands. Over the span of two years, the film documents the legal drama of divorce in light of the Jewish religious laws.

Black Bus, the third film, documents the phenomenon of gender segregation in Jewish religious society. The film features the story of two young ultra-Orthodox who paid a personal price for their attempts to work against the laws of segregation.

Her current film, The Lesson, follows the story of an Egyptian woman fighting for her independence. The Lesson was shown at Haifa Film Festival in 2012.

== Purity ==
Zuria wrote and directed the film. Its producer was Amit Bruier and editor was Era Lapid. Cinematography was by Nurit Aviv, Tulik Galon, and Shiri Bar-on. It features an original score by Jonathan Bar Giora.

This documentary film broke taboos and examined how the laws of taharat hamishpaha (family purity) shape women’s lives and sexuality within Orthodox Judaism. It won prizes such as:

- Jerusalem International Film Festival, Jerusalem, July 2002: Mayor Award for Best Documentary Film
- YAMAGATA International Documentary Film Festival, Japan, October 2003: Special Prize & Citizens’ Prize
- Société Civile des Auteurs Multimedia (SCAM) Prize for "Discovery of the Year", France, 2004

== Sentenced to Marriage ==
Zuria wrote and directed the film. The producer was Amit Bruier and the executive producer was Sigal Landesberg. Era Lapid was the editor. Cinematography was by Roni Cazanelson. The original score was by Jonathan Bar Giora.

This documentary, which was released in 2004, criticized the rabbinical courts in Israel for the first time. The film is a legal drama following three women whose husbands refuse to grant a divorce to their wives, refuse to pay child support, and attend court only haphazardly due to the rabbinical court's understanding of the Jewish laws. The documentary shows a court system weighted heavily against women's favour. The film caused much discussion in the Israeli media and was shown in the Israeli parliament; a special screening was held as well in the New York Museum of Modern Art. It won the following prizes:

- Hot Docs, Canada, 2005: Best Documentary award
- Jerusalem Film Festival, Israel, 2004: Wolgin Award for Best Documentary

== Black Bus ==
Zuria wrote and directed the film, which was produced along with Sigal Landesberg, and edited by Ara Lapid. Cinematography was by Roni Cazanelson.

The documentary shows the religious segregation within the ultra-Orthodox members of Israel's society. The film depicts the stories of two young women from a Hasidic background who tried to battle for their independence. The film won the First prize at Haifa Film Festival and was shown in the Berlin Film Festival as well as other festivals.

== The Lesson ==
Zuria wrote and directed the film, which was produced together with Sigal Landesberg. It was edited by Ara Lapid. Cinematography was by Roni Cazanelson.

A film between a documentary and fiction, it follows the story of Layla Ibrahim, a Muslim woman learning to drive in the streets of Jerusalem. The film won the "Best documentary" award at Haifa International film festival, 2012.

== Conventional Sins ==
Conventional Sins is a film exposing sexual abuse of children in the ultra-Orthodox community: a decade after he was banished from the Hasidic community he grew up in, Meilech reopens the diary he wrote when he was 15. The diary describes the abuse he went through at the hands of a network of ultra-Orthodox pedophiles. Together with a group of young actors who themselves grew up in the Hasidic community, Meilech attempts to reconstruct parts of the diary and tell his story, which the Hasidic community did everything to silence. It was the Winner of Best Documentary at the Jerusalem Film Festival.
