= Youth (Spring) =

2023 documentary film

- Promotional release poster

Chinese name
- Chinese: 青春：春
Transcriptions
Standard Mandarin
- Hanyu Pinyin: qīng chūn: chūn
- Directed by: Wang Bing
- Produced by: Sonia Buchman; Mao Hui; Nicolas R. de La Mothe; Vincent Wang
- Cinematography: Maeda Yoshitaka; Shan Xiaohui; Song Yang; Liu Xianhui; Ding Bihan; Wang Bing
- Edited by: Dominique Auvray; Xu Bingyuan; Liyo Gong
- Production companies: House on Fire; Gladys Glover; CS Production; Arte France Cinéma; Les Films Fauves; Volya Films; Eastern-Lion Pictures and Culture Media Co.; Beijing Contemporary Art Foundation; Le Fresnoy
- Distributed by: Cinema Delicatessen (Netherlands); Les Acacias (France)
- Release dates: 18 May 2023 (Cannes); 16 November 2023 (Netherlands); 3 January 2024 (France)
- Running time: 212 minutes
- Countries: China; France; Luxembourg; Netherlands
- Language: Mandarin

Youth (Spring) (Chinese: 青春：春, romanized: qīng chūn: chūn; French: Jeunesse (Le Printemps)) is a 2023 documentary film directed by Wang Bing. It is an international co-production between China, France, Luxembourg, and the Netherlands. The film focuses on a group of young textile workers in the Chinese town of Zhili. It is the first entry in a trilogy of films that follow the same characters over an extended period of time.

The film was selected to compete for the Palme d'Or at the 76th Cannes Film Festival, where it had its world premiere on 18 May 2023. It is the first installment in Wang Bing's Youth trilogy, followed by Youth (Hard Times) and Youth (Homecoming) in 2024.

== Synopsis ==
The film focuses on a group of young textile workers in Zhili, a town in the Wuxing District of Huzhou, located 150 kilometres outside of Shanghai. Every year, young people leave their rural villages and migrate to the manufacturing town. The workers are in their twenties, some in their thirties. They sleep upstairs, in dormitories, because they come from far away, sometimes over 2,000 kilometres. Their dialects come from different regions. They work tirelessly with the hope of one day having children, buying a house or starting their own business. Friendships and romances fold and unfold as the seasons pass. Geographical dispersion, financial instability, and economic and family pressures ravish their innocence and youth. Wang Bing will spend a year with them in Zhili: at work, at home, on the Internet, every day of their professional, romantic relationships and friendships.

== Production ==
The film was shot in the Chinese province of Zhejiang, from 2014 to 2019. Wang Bing shot the film in the Zhili, a manufacturing town in Huzhou City. Zhili is the same location where Wang Bing shot his 2016 film Bitter Money. Youth (Spring) also covers the same subject – young workers in the textile workshops. However, the films do not focus on the same people. There were six people shooting, three at the same time, with three cameras, to compensate for the city's sizeable area and the film's many characters. Wang Bing devoted himself to the project, living for several years in a nearby town. He struggled for the first three months, but eventually befriended the local business managers, who were largely preoccupied with their daily lives. Provided the production would not disturb the running of their businesses, they did not object to the film or what would or would not be shown of the working conditions of their employees.

Youth (Spring) the first entry in a trilogy of films that follow the same characters over an extended period of time. Wang Bing filmed the people at their workplace, but also followed some of them in the opposite direction to their province of origin, to celebrate Chinese New Year with their families. In an interview with Cahiers du Cinéma on 30 January 2023, Wang Bing estimated the trilogy would run for approximately nine hours and forty minutes, and assured that 10 hours would be the limit.

The film is produced by House on Fire, Gladys Glover and CS Production, in co-production Arte France Cinéma, Les Films Fauves (Luxembourg), Volya Films (Netherlands), Eastern-Lion Pictures and Culture Media Co., Beijing Contemporary Art Foundation, and Le Fresnoy - Studio national des arts contemporains.

== Release ==
Youth (Spring) was selected to compete for the Palme d'Or at the 2023 Cannes Film Festival, where it had its world premiere on 18 May 2023. It was also invited at the 28th Busan International Film Festival in 'Icon' section and was screened on 5 October 2023.

The film was theatrically released in the Netherlands on 16 November 2023 by Cinema Delicatessen, and in France on 3 January 2024 by Les Acacias. International sales were handled by Pyramide International, who sold the next two parts of the trilogy: Youth (Hard Times) and Youth (Homecoming).

== Reception ==
=== Critical response ===
On Rotten Tomatoes, the film holds an approval rating of 86% based on 35 reviews, with an average rating of 7.2/10. The website's critics consensus reads: "Youth (Spring) presents an earnest and poignant -- if somewhat repetitive -- look at the experiences of Chinese garment workers." On Metacritic, the film has a weighted average score of 74 out of 100, based on 14 critic reviews, indicating "generally favorable" reviews.

=== Accolades ===
Award	Date of ceremony	Category	Recipient(s)	Result	Ref.
Cannes Film Festival	27 May 2023	Palme d'Or	Wang Bing	Nominated	
Cannes Film Festival	27 May 2023	L'Œil d'or	Wang Bing	Nominated	
Golden Horse Awards	25 November 2023	Best Documentary Feature	Youth (Spring)	Won	
Jerusalem Film Festival	23 July 2023	In the Spirit of Freedom Award for Best Documentary Film	Youth (Spring)	Nominated	
Jerusalem Film Festival	23 July 2023	Chantel Akerman Award for Best Experimental Documentary	Youth (Spring)	Nominated	
Los Angeles Film Critics Association Awards	10 December 2023	Douglas Edwards Experimental Film Prize	Youth (Spring)	Won	
Valladolid International Film Festival	28 October 2023	Tiempo de Historia Award	Youth (Spring)	Nominated	
