= Yamagata International Documentary Film Festival =

Biennial film festival in Japan

- Location: Yamagata, Japan
- Founded: 1989
- No. of films: 238
- Language: International
- Website: http://www.yidff.jp/home-e.html

The Yamagata International Documentary Film Festival is a documentary film festival held biennially in Yamagata, Japan (38°15′N 140°20′E).

It was first held in October 1989, which makes it one of the longest-running documentary film festivals in the world and the most distinguished such festival in Asia. Its emphasis is on showcasing the best achievements in documentary filmmaking, as well as promoting and popularizing the genre and documentary filmmaking in the region.

The festival was most recently held in October 2023. 1,633 films from 109 countries were submitted, with 238 films screened as part of the international and regional competitions. The festival attracted an audience of around 23,000 people. Since 2001, the competition has included films shot in DV. In 1991, a Young Asian Talents section was established.

== Awards ==
A number of prizes are awarded at the festival, including:

- For films in the international competition:
  - Robert and Frances Flaherty Prize (The Grand Prize)
  - Mayor's Prize (Prize of Excellence)
  - Special Jury Prize
  - Runner-up Prize
- For films in the regional competition:
  - Shinsuke Ogawa Award, for new up-and-coming Asian filmmakers
- Overall:
  - Citizens' Prize, voted for by the festival audiences

== Award winners ==
=== 1989 YIDFF ===
The first festival edition was held 10–15 October 1989. Along with the competition screenings, the festival hosted a retrospective of films by Robert and Frances Flaherty and a comprehensive screening of Japanese documentaries from the first half of the 20th century. In total, 80 films were seen by an audience of around 12,000.

Award	Film	Director
Robert and Frances Flaherty Prize (The Grand Prize)	The Crossroad Street (Skersiela)	(Soviet Union) Ivars Seleckis
Mayor's Prize (Award of Excellence)	Route One USA	(France) Robert Kramer
Runner-up Prize	The Eye above the Well (Het Oog boven de put); Nobody Listened (Nadie escuchaba); Weapons of the Spirit (Les Armes de l'esprit)	(Netherlands) Johan van der Keuken (Spain) Jorge Ulla, & (Spain) Néstor Almendros (France) Pierre Sauvage
Special Jury Prize	Time Has No Name (Tiden har inget namn)	(Sweden) Stefan Jarl
Encouragement Prize	Over the Threshold	(United Kingdom) Christine Lloyd-Fitt, & (Japan) Yoshi Tezuka
Citizens' Prize	Weapons of the Spirit (Les Armes de l'esprit)	(France) Pierre Sauvage

=== 1991 YIDFF ===
The second festival edition was held 7–13 October 1991. Along with the competition screenings, the festival hosted a program devoted solely to Asian films, as well as a selection of Japanese films from the post-WWII period. In total, 153 films were shown, which attracted an audience of around 14,000.

Award	Film	Director
Robert and Frances Flaherty Prize (The Grand Prize)	Stubborn Dreams	(Hungary) Béla Szobolits
Mayor's Prize (Award of Excellence)	Locked-Up Time (Ha-Behirah V'Hagoral)	(Germany) Sibylle Schönemann
Runner-up Prize	American Dream; OnceThere Were Seven Simeons (Reiz dzīvoja septiņi Simeoni)	(United States) Barbara Kopple (Soviet Union) Herz Frank, & (Soviet Union) Vladimir Eisner
Special Jury Prize	Canticle of the Stones (Le Cantique des pierres)	(Palestine) Michel Khleifi
Encouragement Prize	Children of Mini-Japan (Kutty Japanin Kuzhandaigal)	(India) Chalam Bennurkar
Citizens' Prize	Children of Mini-Japan (Kutty Japanin Kuzhandaigal)	(India) Chalam Bennurkar

=== 1993 YIDFF ===
The third festival edition was held 5–11 October 1993. Along with the competition screenings, the festival hosted a selection of Asian films, as well as a selection of films focusing on native peoples from North and South America, New Zealand, Australia and Japan. The Shinsuke Ogawa Award for most promising Asian film director in the New Asian Currents program was introduced. In total, 139 films were shown. As an illustrative example, one of the official selections, Le pays des sourds (In the Land of the Deaf) focused primarily on Deaf communities in France; but the documentary also featured a brief segment identifying commonalities in French Sign Language and Japanese Sign Language. The event attracted an audience of around 20,000 people.

Award	Film	Director
Robert and Frances Flaherty Prize (The Grand Prize)	Black Harvest	(Australia) Robin Anderson (Australia) Bob Connolly
Mayor's Prize (Award of Excellence)	Zoo	(United States) Frederick Wiseman
Runner-up Prize	Living on the River Agano (Agano ni ikiru); Loss Is to Be Expected (Mit Verlust ist zu rechnen)	(Japan) Makoto Satō (Austria) Ulrich Seidl
Special Jury Prize	Elegy from Russia (Le Cantique des pierres)	(Russia) Aleksandr Sokurov
Shinsuke Ogawa Award	My Time with the Red Guards	(China) Wu Wenguang
Citizens' Prize	In the Name of God (Raam Ke Naam)	(India) Anand Patwardhan

=== 1995 YIDFF ===
The fourth festival edition was held 3–9 October 1995. Along with the competition screenings, the festival hosted a retrospective of films from the early days of cinema in honor of the Lumière brothers' cinematograph centennial. In total, 278 films were shown, which attracted an audience of around 21,000 people.

Award	Film	Director
Robert and Frances Flaherty Prize (The Grand Prize)	Choice and Destiny (Ha-Behirah V'Hagoral)	(Israel) Tsipi Reibenbach
Mayor's Prize (Award of Excellence)	Metal and Melancholy (Metaal en melancholie)	(Netherlands) Heddy Honigmann
Runner-up Prize	Screenplay: The Times (Drehbuch - Die Zeiten); Picture of Light	(Germany) Barbara Junge & (Germany) Winfried Junge (Canada) Peter Mettler
Special Jury Prize	Father, Son, and Holy War (Pitra, Putra Aur Dharamyuddha)	(India) Anand Patwardhan
Shinsuke Ogawa Award	The Murmuring (Najeun moksori)	(South Korea) Byun Young-Joo
Citizens' Prize	Screenplay: The Times (Drehbuch - Die Zeiten)	(Germany) Barbara Junge, & (Germany) Winfried Junge
FIPRESCI Award	The Square (Guang Chang); Last Farewell USSR	(China) Duan Jinchuan, & (China) Zhang Yuan (Ukraine) Oleksandr Rodnyansky
FIPRESCI; Special Mention	Embracing (Ni tsutsumarete)	(Japan) Naomi Kawase
We Love Cinema Award	Last Farewell USSR; Scenes of Violence (Katatsumori)	(Ukraine) Oleksandr Rodnyansky (Japan) Naomi Kawase

=== 1997 YIDFF ===
The fifth festival edition was held 6–13 October 1997. In all competitions and programs 187 films were shown, and attendance was around 23,000.

Award	Film	Director
Robert and Frances Flaherty Prize (The Grand Prize)	Fragments: Jerusalem (Shivrei T'munot Yerushalayim)	(Israel) Ron Havilio
Mayor's Prize (Award of Excellence)	Africa, How Are You with Pain? (Afriques, comment ça va avec la douleur?)	(France) Raymond Depardon
Runner-up Prize	Paper Heads (Papierové hlavy); Tu as crié: Let me go	(Slovakia) Dušan Hanák (Canada) Anne Claire Poirier
Special Jury Prize	La Comédie-Française ou l'amour joué?	(United States) Frederick Wiseman
Shinsuke Ogawa Award	Out of Phoenix Bridge (Hui dao feng huang qiao)	(China) Li Hong
Citizens' Prize	Private Wars	(Philippines) Nick Deocampo
FIPRESCI Award	Homesick Eyes (Wang hsiang)	(Taiwan) Hsu Hsiao-ming
FIPRESCI; Special Mention	London Brief	(United States) Jon Jost
We Love Cinema Award	Out of Phoenix Bridge (Hui dao feng huang qiao); Neon Goddesses	(China) Li Hong (Hong Kong) Yu Lik-wai

=== 1999 YIDFF ===
The sixth festival edition was held 19–25 October 1999. Apart from the usual international and regional competition programs, a retrospective of films by Joris Ivens was shown. In total 188 films were shown, and attendance was around 20,000.

Award	Film	Director
Robert and Frances Flaherty Prize (The Grand Prize)	Images of the Absence (Buenos Aires, meine Geschichte)	(Germany) Germán Kral
Mayor's Prize (Award of Excellence)	Belfast, Maine	(United States) Frederick Wiseman
Runner-up Prize	Sweep It Up, Swig It Down (Kehrein, kehraus); Happy Birthday, Mr. Mograbi (Yom Huledet Same'ach Mar Mograbi)	(Germany) Gerd Kroske (Israel) Avi Mograbi
Special Jury Prize	The Underground Orchestra (Het Ondergrondse orkest)	(Netherlands) Heddy Honigmann
Shinsuke Ogawa Award	Swimming on the Highway (Hui dao feng huang qiao)	(Taiwan) Wu Yao-tung
Citizens' Prize	Living Amongst Lions (Leve blant løver)	(Norway) Sigve Endresen
FIPRESCI Award	Divorce Iranian Style	(United Kingdom) Kim Longinotto (Iran) Ziba Mir-Hosseini
FIPRESCI; Special Mention	The New God (Atarashii kamisama)	(Japan) Yutaka Tsuchiya
NETPAC Award	Shiro the White	(Japan) Katsuyuki Hirano
NETPAC; Special Mention	Annyong-Kimchi; I Love (080)	(Japan) Tetsuaki Matsue (Taiwan) Yang Li-chou

=== 2001 YIDFF ===
The seventh festival edition was held 3–9 October 2001. Apart from the usual international and regional competition programs, retrospectives of films by Robert Kramer and Fumio Kamei were shown. In total 183 films were shown, and attendance was around 18,000.

Award	Film	Director
Robert and Frances Flaherty Prize (The Grand Prize)	The Land of the Wandering Souls (La Terre des âmes errantes)	(Cambodia) Rithy Panh
Mayor's Prize (Award of Excellence)	In Vanda’s Room (No Quarto da Vanda)	(Portugal) Pedro Costa
Runner-up Prize	Mysterious Object at Noon (Dokfa nai meuman); 6 Easy Pieces	(Thailand) Apichatpong Weerasethakul (United States) Jon Jost
Special Jury Prize	A2	(Japan) Tatsuya Mori
Shinsuke Ogawa Award	Soshin: In Your Dreams	(Australia) Melissa Kyu-Jung Lee
Citizens' Prize	A2	(Japan) Tatsuya Mori
FIPRESCI Award	In Vanda’s Room (No Quarto da Vanda); My Friend Su	(Portugal) Pedro Costa (India) Neeraj Bhasin
NETPAC Award	My Migrant Soul	(Bangladesh) Yasmine Kabir
NETPAC; Special Mention	Pansy & Ivy; Mysterious Object at Noon (Dokfa nai meuman)	(South Korea) Kye Un-kyoung (Thailand) Apichatpong Weerasethakul

=== 2003 YIDFF ===
The eighth festival edition was held 10–16 October 2003. In total 177 films were shown, and attendance was around 19,000.

Award	Film	Director
Robert and Frances Flaherty Prize (The Grand Prize)	Tie Xi Qu: West of the Tracks	(China) Wang Bing
Mayor's Prize (Award of Excellence)	Stevie	(United States) Steve James
Runner-up Prize	Gift of Life; S-21: The Khmer Rouge Killing Machine (S-21, la machine de mort Khmère rouge)	(Taiwan) Wu Yii-feng (Cambodia) Rithy Panh
Special Jury Prize	Purity (Tehora)	(Israel) Anat Zuria
Shinsuke Ogawa Award	Wellspring	(China) Qing Sha
Citizens' Prize	Purity (Tehora)	(Israel) Anat Zuria
FIPRESCI Award	Three-Five People	(China) Li Lin
FIPRESCI Award; Special Mention	A Short Journey	(Thailand) Tanon Sattarujawong

=== 2005 YIDFF ===
The ninth festival edition was held 7–13 October 2005. Apart from the usual regional and international competition programs, the festival screened a selection of films about Zainichi Koreans, as well as screenings of personal documentaries in collaboration with Visions du réel. In total 145 films were shown, and attendance was around 20,000.

Award	Film	Director
Robert and Frances Flaherty Prize (The Grand Prize)	Before the Flood (Yan mo)	(China) Yifan Li (China) Yu Yan
Mayor's Prize (Award of Excellence)	Route 181: Fragments of a Journey in Palestine-Israel	(Palestine) Michel Khleifi (Israel) Eyal Sivan
Runner-up Prize	Foreland (Voorland); About a Farm (Hiljainen tila)	(Netherlands) Albert Elings, Eugenie Jansen (Finland) Mervi Junkkonen
Special Jury Prize	Darwin's Nightmare	(Austria) Hubert Sauper
Shinsuke Ogawa Award	The Cheese and the Worms (Chīzu to ujimushi)	(Japan) Haruyo Kato
Citizens' Prize	In the Shadow of the Palms	(Australia) Wayne Coles-Janess
FIPRESCI Award	The Cheese and the Worms (Chīzu to ujimushi)	(Japan) Haruyo Kato
Community Cinema Award	Darwin's Nightmare	(Austria) Hubert Sauper

=== 2007 YIDFF ===
The tenth festival edition was held 4–11 October 2007. Apart from the usual regional and international competition programs, the festival also screened a program devoted to German documentaries focused on German history. In total 238 films were shown, and attendance was around 23,000.

Award	Film	Director
Robert and Frances Flaherty Prize (The Grand Prize)	Fengming, a Chinese Memoir (He Fengming)	(China) Wang Bing
Mayor's Prize (Award of Excellence)	Encounters (Encontros)	(France) Pierre-Marie Goulet
Runner-up Prize	Potosi: The Journey (Potosi, le temps du voyage); M	(Israel) Ron Havilio (Argentina) Nicolás Prividera
Special Jury Prize	Tarachime birth/mother (Tarachime)	(Japan) Naomi Kawase
Shinsuke Ogawa Award	Bingai	(China) Feng Yan
Citizens' Prize	Mr. Pilipenko and His Submarine (Herr Pilipenko und sein U-Boot); Back Drop Kurdistan	(Germany) René Harder, & (Germany) Jan Hinrik Drevs (Japan) Masaru Nomoto
Community Cinema Award	Bingai	(China) Feng Yan

=== 2009 YIDFF ===
October 8–15, 2009

Award	Film	Director
Prizes for the International Competition
Robert and Frances Flaherty Prize (The Grand Prize)	Encirclement—Neo-Liberalism Ensnares Democracy	Richard Brouillette (Canada)
Mayor's Prize	Oblivion	Heddy Honigmann (Netherlands/Germany)
Special Jury Prize	Japan: A Story of Love and Hate	Sean McAllister (UK/Japan)
New Asian Currents Awards
Shinsuke Ogawa Award	American Alley	Kim Dong-ryung (Korea)
Citizens' Prize	Japan: A Story of Love and Hate	Sean McAllister (UK/Japan)
Citizens' Prize	Yuri—About Loving	Azuma Mieko (Germany)
Community Cinema Award	Bilal	Sourav Sarangi (India)
Directors' Guild of Japan Award	Doctor Ma’s Country Clinic	Cong Feng (China)

=== 2011 YIDFF ===
October 6–13, 2011

Award	Film	Director
Prizes for the International Competition
Robert and Frances Flaherty Prize (The Grand Prize)	The Collaborator and His Family	Ruthie Shatz, Adi Barash (USA/Israel/France)
Mayor's Prize	Nostalgia for the Light (Nostalgia de la luz)	Patricio Guzmán (France/Germany/Chile)
Awards of Excellence	Apuda	He Yuan (China)
Awards of Excellence	The Woman with the 5 Elephants (Die Frau mit den 5 Elefanten)	Vadim Jendreyko (Switzerland/Germany)
Special Jury Prize	Distinguished Flying Cross	Travis Wilkerson (USA)
New Asian Currents Awards
Shinsuke Ogawa Award	Yuguo and His Mother	Gu Tao (China)
Citizens' Prize	The Woman with the 5 Elephants (Die Frau mit den 5 Elefanten)	Vadim Jendreyko (Switzerland/Germany)
Citizens' Prize	Iranian Cookbook	Mohammad Shirvani (Iran)
Community Cinema Award	Iranian Cookbook	Mohammad Shirvani (Iran)
Directors' Guild of Japan Award	Prison and Paradise	Daniel Rudi Haryanto (Indonesia)

=== 2013 YIDFF ===
October 10–17, 2013

Award	Film	Director
Prizes for the International Competition
Robert and Frances Flaherty Prize (The Grand Prize)	A World Not Ours	Mahdi Fleifel (Denmark)
Mayor's Prize	The Act of Killing	Joshua Oppenheimer (Denmark)
Awards of Excellence	Revision	Philip Scheffner (Germany)
Awards of Excellence	The Other Day (El otro día)	Ignacio Agüero (Chile)
Special Jury Prize	Tour of Duty	Kim Dong-ryung, Park Kyoung-tae (Korea)
New Asian Currents Awards
Shinsuke Ogawa Award	Mrs. Bua’s Carpet	Dương Mộng Thu (Vietnam)
Awards of Excellence	Raging Land 3: Three Valleys	Chan Yin Kai, Choi Yuen Villagers (Hong Kong)
Awards of Excellence	Mohtarama	Malek Shafi’i, Diana Saqeb (Afghanistan)
Special Mentions	War Is a Tender Thing	Adjani Arumpac (Philippines)
Citizens' Prize	The Punk Syndrome (Kovasikajuttu)	Jukka Kärkkäinen, J-P Passi (Finland)
Citizens' Prize	The Targeted Village	Mikami Chie (Japan)
Community Cinema Award	We Want (U) to Know	Ella Pugliese, Nou Va, The people of Thnol Lok (Germany/Cambodia)
Directors' Guild of Japan Award	The Targeted Village	Mikami Chie (Japan)

=== 2015 YIDFF ===
October 8–15, 2015

Award	Film	Director
Prizes for the International Competition
Robert and Frances Flaherty Prize (The Grand Prize)	Horse Money (Cavalo dinheiro)	Pedro Costa (Portugal)
Mayor's Prize	The Pearl Button (El botón de nácar)	Patricio Guzmán (Chile)
Awards of Excellence	Homeland: Iraq Year Zero	Abbas Fahdel (Iraq)
Awards of Excellence	Silvered Water, Syria Self-Portrait	Ossama Mohammed, Wiam Simav Bedirxan (Syria)
Special Jury Prize	Us Women/Them Women (Nosotras/ellas)	Julia Pesce (Argentina)
New Asian Currents Awards
Shinsuke Ogawa Award	Standing Men (Des hommes debout)	Maya Abdul-Malak (Lebanon)
Awards of Excellence	Snakeskin	Daniel Hui (Singapore)
Awards of Excellence	Each Story	Okuma Katsuya (Japan)
Citizens' Prize	Homeland: Iraq Year Zero	Abbas Fahdel (Iraq)
Directors' Guild of Japan Award	My No-Mercy Home	Aori (Korea)

=== 2017 YIDFF ===
October 5–12, 2017

Award	Film	Director
Prizes for the International Competition
Robert and Frances Flaherty Prize (The Grand Prize)	Communion (Komunia)	Anna Zamecka (Poland)
Mayor's Prize	A Memory in Khaki	Alfoz Tanjour (Syria)
Awards of Excellence	Lone Existence	Sha Qing (China)
Awards of Excellence	I Am Not Your Negro	Raoul Peck (USA)
Special Jury Prize	In the Intense Now (No intenso agora)	João Moreira Salles (Brazil)
New Asian Currents Awards
Shinsuke Ogawa Award	Yellowing	Chan Tze-Woon (Hong Kong)
Awards of Excellence	The Slice Room	Song Yun-hyeok (Korea)
Awards of Excellence	Up Down & Sideways	Anushka Meenakshi, Iswar Srikumar (India)
Special Mentions	Bamseom Pirates, Seoul Inferno	Jung Yoon-suk (Korea)
Special Mentions	City of Jade (Fei cui zhi cheng)	Midi Z (Taiwan)
Citizens' Prize	Sennan Asbestos Disaster	Hara Kazuo (Japan)
Directors' Guild of Japan Award	Up Down & Sideways	Anushka Meenakshi, Iswar Srikumar (India)

=== 2019 YIDFF ===
October 10-17, 2019

Award	Film	Director
Prizes for the International Competition
Robert and Frances Flaherty Prize (The Grand Prize)	Dead Souls	Wang Bing (China)
Mayor's Prize	The Crosses (Las cruces)	Teresa Arredondo, Carlos Vásquez Méndez (Chile)
Awards of Excellence	Midnight Traveler	Hassan Fazili (USA)
Awards of Excellence	Your Turn (Espero tua (re)volta)	Eliza Capai (Brazil)
Special Jury Prize	Monrovia, Indiana	Frederick Wiseman (USA)
New Asian Currents Awards
Shinsuke Ogawa Award	Erased,___Ascent of the Invisible	Ghassan Halwani (Lebanon)
Awards of Excellence	Xalko	Sami Mermer, Hind Benchekroun (Canada)
Awards of Excellence	Exodus	Bahman Kiarostami (Iran)
Citizens' Prize	Dead Souls	Wang Bing (China)
Directors' Guild of Japan Award	Gracefully	Arash Eshaghi (Iran)
