= Children of Mini-Japan =

- Directed by: Chalam Bennurkar
- Release date: 1990
- Running time: 63 minutes
- Country: India
- Language: Tamil

Children of Mini-Japan (Kutty Japanin Kuzhandaigal) is a Tamil-language documentary film directed by Chalam Bennurkar and released in 1990.

== Synopsis ==
The film focuses on the plight of young poverty-stricken children working in Sivakasi in the late 1980s, and the Government's neglect of them.

The children worked in factories famed for producing fireworks and matches. The film takes its name from the nickname of Sivakasi, Mini-Japan, a name given to the town for its high technology and business standards.

== Awards ==
The film has won the following awards since its release:

1991 International Leipzig Festival for Documentary and Animated Film (Germany)

- Won – Golden Dove – Children of Mini-Japan – Chalam Bennurkar

1991 Yamagata International Documentary Film Festival (Japan)

- Won – Citizens' Prize – Children of Mini-Japan – Chalam Bennurkar
- Won – Prize for Encouragement – Children of Mini-Japan – Chalam Bennurkar
