= Fengming, a Chinese Memoir =

Chinese 2007 film

- Film poster
- Directed by: Wang Bing
- Produced by: K. Lihong; Louise Prince
- Starring: He Fengming
- Cinematography: Wang Bing
- Edited by: Adam Kerby
- Production companies: WIL Productions; Aeternam Films; Fantasy Pictures
- Release dates: 18 May 2007 (Cannes); 7 September 2007 (TIFF); 5 October 2007 (YIDFF)
- Running time: 184 minutes
- Countries: China; Hong Kong; Belgium
- Language: Mandarin

Fengming, a Chinese Memoir (simplified Chinese: 和凤鸣; traditional Chinese: 和鳳鳴; pinyin: Hé Fèngmíng), also known as Chronicle of a Chinese Woman, is a 2007 Chinese documentary film directed by Wang Bing. The film consists almost entirely of an interview with the elderly He Fengming, recounting her experiences in post-1949 China.

== Synopsis ==
Caught up the fervor of the Chinese Communist Revolution, she abandoned her plans to study at university and took a job at the Gansu Daily newspaper, the official newspaper of Gansu Provincial Committee of the Chinese Communist Party. Her husband, fellow journalist Wang Jingchao, wrote several critical essays at the height of the Hundred Flowers Campaign. With the launch of the subsequent Anti-Rightist Campaign, Wang was attacked for these statements, and she was condemned by association. The two were sent to separate labor camps, where Wang eventually died. He Fengming was released, briefly imprisoned again during the Cultural Revolution, and finally rehabilitated. In the early 1990s she published a memoir, My Life in 1957.

== Production ==
Wang Bing first met He in 1995 and interviewed her in the course of research for his second feature (after 2002's Tie Xi Qu: West of the Tracks). After receiving a commission from the Kunsten Festival des Arts, Wang decided to record He's story, resulting in a 50- and then a 130-minute film. After the Festival, Wang went back and conducted an additional interview, bringing the film to its final three-hour running time. The director employed an unusually stripped-down style, relying mainly a single camera set-up with only the occasional cut or dissolve.

The full-length version premiered, out of competition, at the 2007 Cannes Film Festival. It subsequently played the international festival circuit, winning the Grand Prize at the 2007 Yamagata International Documentary Film Festival.
