= Three Sisters (2012 film) =

Documentary film by Wang Bing

- 三姊妹
- Directed by: Wang Bing
- Production companies: Album Productions; Chinese Shadows
- Release dates: September 2012 (Venice); 10 May 2013
- Running time: 153 minutes
- Country: China
- Language: Mandarin

Three Sisters (Chinese: 三姊妹; pinyin: Sān Zǐmèi) is a 2012 Chinese documentary film directed by Wang Bing. The film received the Orizzonti Award at the 69th Venice International Film Festival, where it premiered. An abridged version of the film was released under the title Alone in 2013.

== Synopsis ==
The film depicts three sisters (aged between four and ten years old) living in a small village near the Sino-Burmese border. They have been abandoned by their mother while their father seeks work in a nearby city. The girls are seen working in the fields or roaming around in the village. The father eventually returns to the village, with plans to take his daughters with him to the city, but decides to leave the oldest one in the care of the grandfather.

== Reception ==
American film critic J. Hoberman wrote that Three Sisters, is a "magnificent 2012 portrait of young children in a subsistence-level village in Yunnan province, largely fending for themselves after their father has gone to the city to work", and that the documentary is filmed in "a poverty-stricken environment ... but rather than an exposé of poverty, Three Sisters is about the lived experience of the girls existence". Jay Weissberg of Variety Magazine praised the film, stating it is "an unquestionably eye-opening, deeply human, strikingly lensed look at an impoverished family whose rudimentary living conditions are a sharp riposte to the illusion of China's economic boom".

Jeannette Catsoulis wrote in The New York Times that the film "documents extreme poverty in rural China with the compassionate eye and inexhaustible patience of a director whose curiosity about his country's unfortunates never seems to wane". In his three out of four star review for Slant Magazine, Chris Cabin opined that Wang's "no-frills style of documentation visually echoes the preadolescent trio's simple yet unforgiving world and its sense of labor as life".

Steve Erickson stated that Bing's Three Sisters "shows the China left behind in its economic explosion ... and the director's "work challenges the dominant, triumphal narrative about China’s economic rise by focusing on people still damaged by communism and left behind by capitalism". Erickson also noted that while the film is "Wang's most accessible film so far, it’s still challenging. Wang's style of documentary is based around experience, not storytelling; he wants the spectator to feel like they have spent the film’s running time living alongside its subjects".

== See also ==
- Wang Bing filmography
