= 'Til Madness Do Us Part =

- International promotional poster
- Traditional Chinese: 瘋愛
- Simplified Chinese: 疯爱
- Directed by: Wang Bing
- Written by: Wang Bing
- Produced by: Wang Bing; Louise Prince
- Cinematography: Wang Bing; Xianhui Liu
- Edited by: Wang Bing; Adam Kerby
- Production companies: Moviola; Rai Cinema; Y. Production
- Distributed by: Les Acacias (France); Moviola (Japan)
- Release dates: 4 September 2013 (Venice); 11 March 2015 (France)
- Running time: 228 minutes
- Countries: China; Japan; France; Italy
- Language: Mandarin

'Til Madness Do Us Part (simplified Chinese: 疯爱; traditional Chinese: 瘋愛) is a 2013 Chinese cinema verité documentary film directed by Wang Bing. It observes the daily activity on one floor of a Chinese mental institution in Yunnan, Southwest of China.

The film had its world premiere out of competition at the 70th Venice International Film Festival, on 4 September 2013.

== Premise ==
The floor of the Chinese mental institution houses 50 male patients, including individuals who have killed someone, those who committed crimes against public officials, and those with developmental disabilities. It is not clearly stated why the men are in the mental institution, adding to the observational approach of the documentary. The documentary film uses handheld camerawork and digital video to capture the relationship between society and individuals. Towards the end of the film, one of the patients is allowed to return to his home village. It creates a contrast to the isolation and atmosphere of the mental institution.

== Reception ==
Slant Magazine said, "Whether in terms of filmmaking or indeed reality itself, it's hard to think of a more quietly radical proposition than the one Wang is making here: There's compassion to be found in even the harshest of circumstances; it's all about knowing where to look."

== Festivals ==
The documentary was shown at the following festivals

- 2013 Venice Film Festival
- Winner, 2013 Festival des 3 Continents of Nantes
- 2013 Toronto Film Festival
- 2013 Rio Film Festival
- 2013 Busan Film Festival
- 2013 DocLisboa
- 2013 Viennale
- 2013 Golden Horse Festival
- 2014 Rotterdam Film Festival
- 2014 Goteborg Film Festival
- 2014 Hong Kong Film Festival
- 2014 Sydney Film Festival
- 2014 Edinburgh Film Festival
- 2014 Melbourne Film Festival
- 2014 Geneva Film Festival
