= 2023 Los Angeles Film Critics Association Awards =

Annual US film awards ceremony

49th LAFCA Awards
- Date: December 10, 2023

Highlights
- Best Picture: The Zone of Interest

The 49th Los Angeles Film Critics Association Awards, given by the Los Angeles Film Critics Association (LAFCA), honoured the best in film for 2023. The awards were announced on December 10, 2023. The Zone of Interest received the most awards with four wins, including Best Film, Best Director and Best Lead Performance. The winners were honored at the association's annual banquet, which was dedicated to "beloved friends of film Bérénice Reynaud and Doug Jones", in the Los Angeles Millennium Hotels & Resorts on January 13, 2024.

== Winners ==
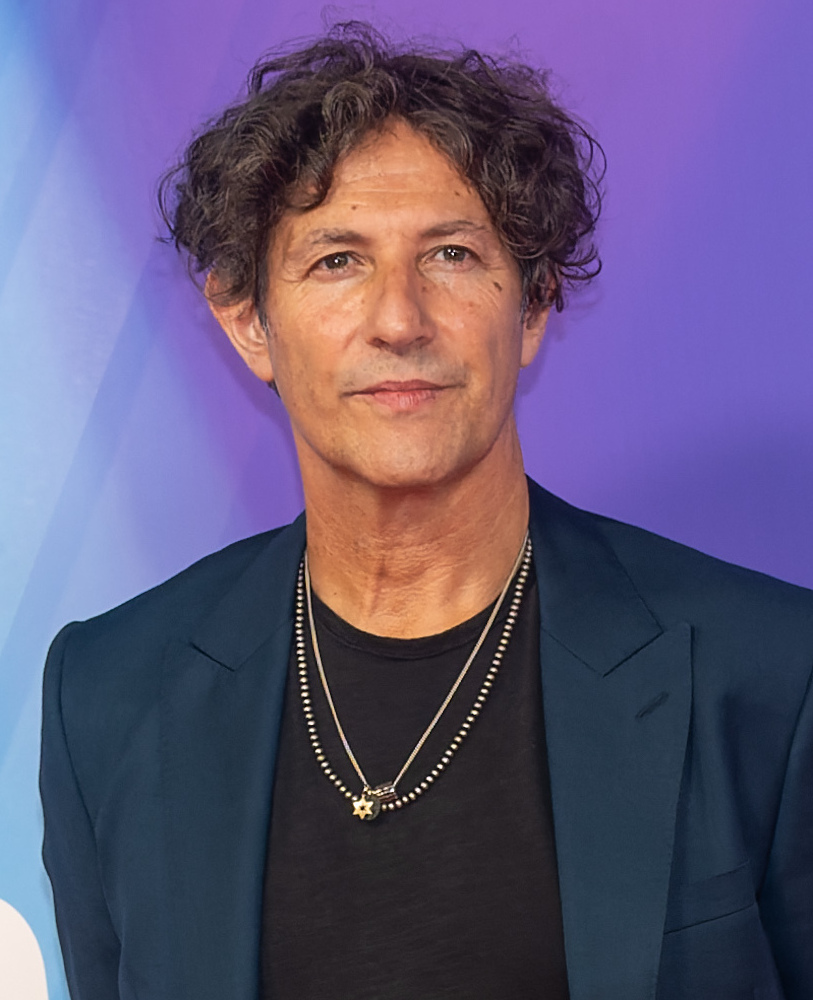
Jonathan Glazer, Best Director winner

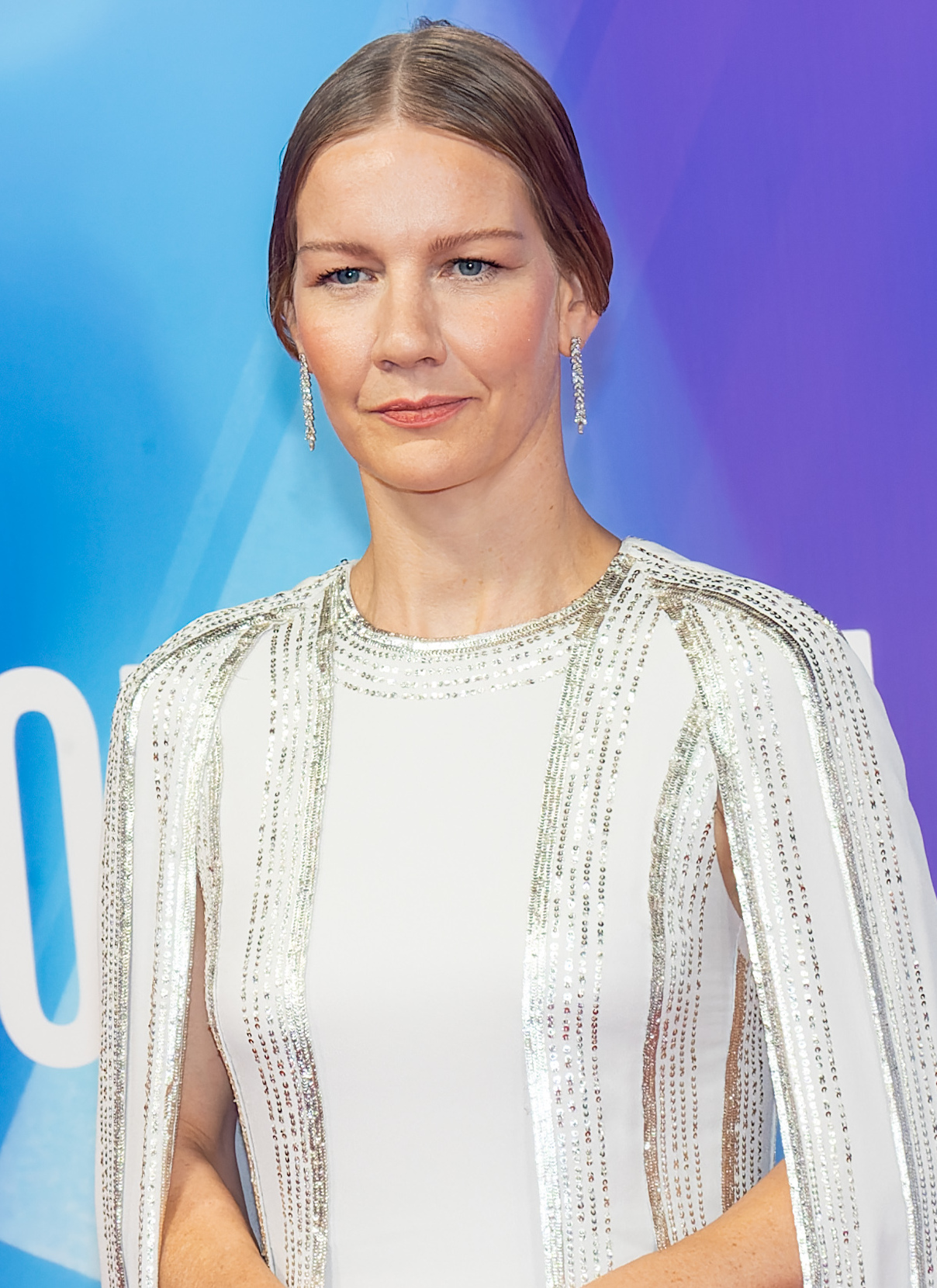
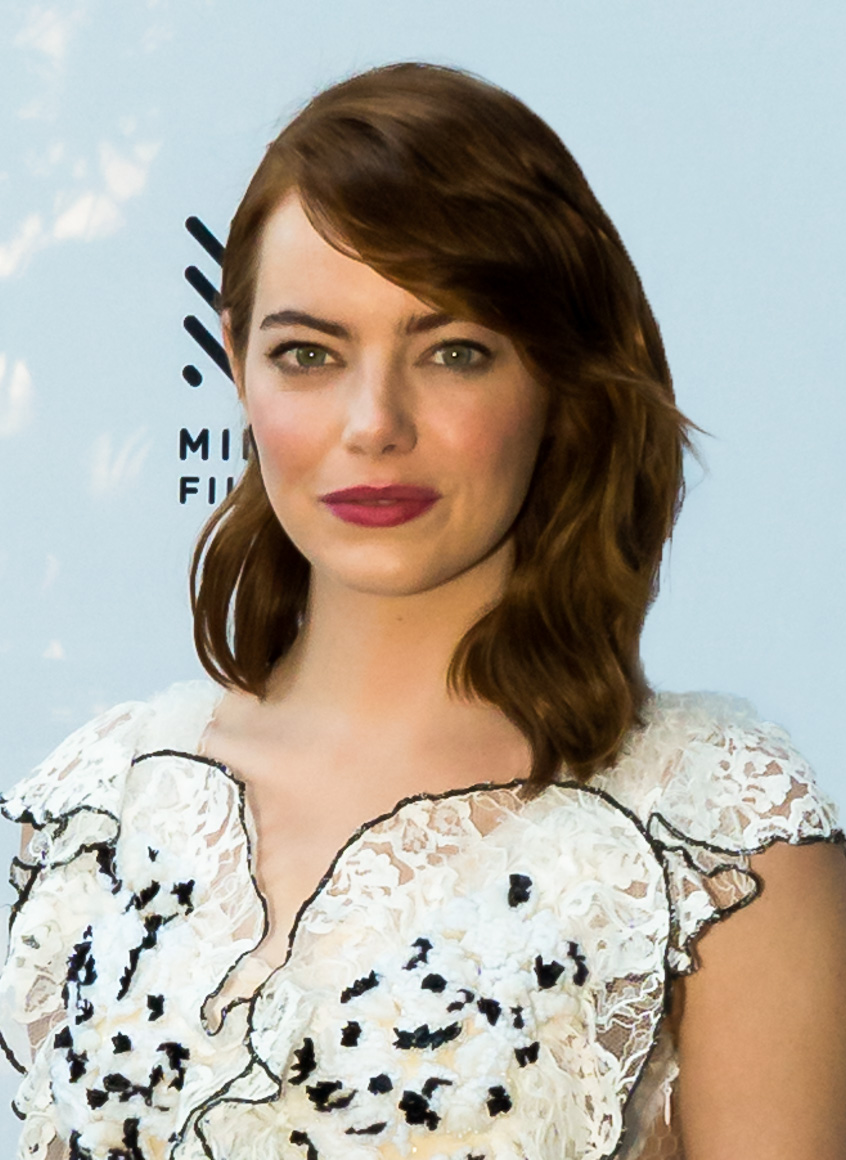
Sandra Hüller and Emma Stone, Best Lead Performance winners
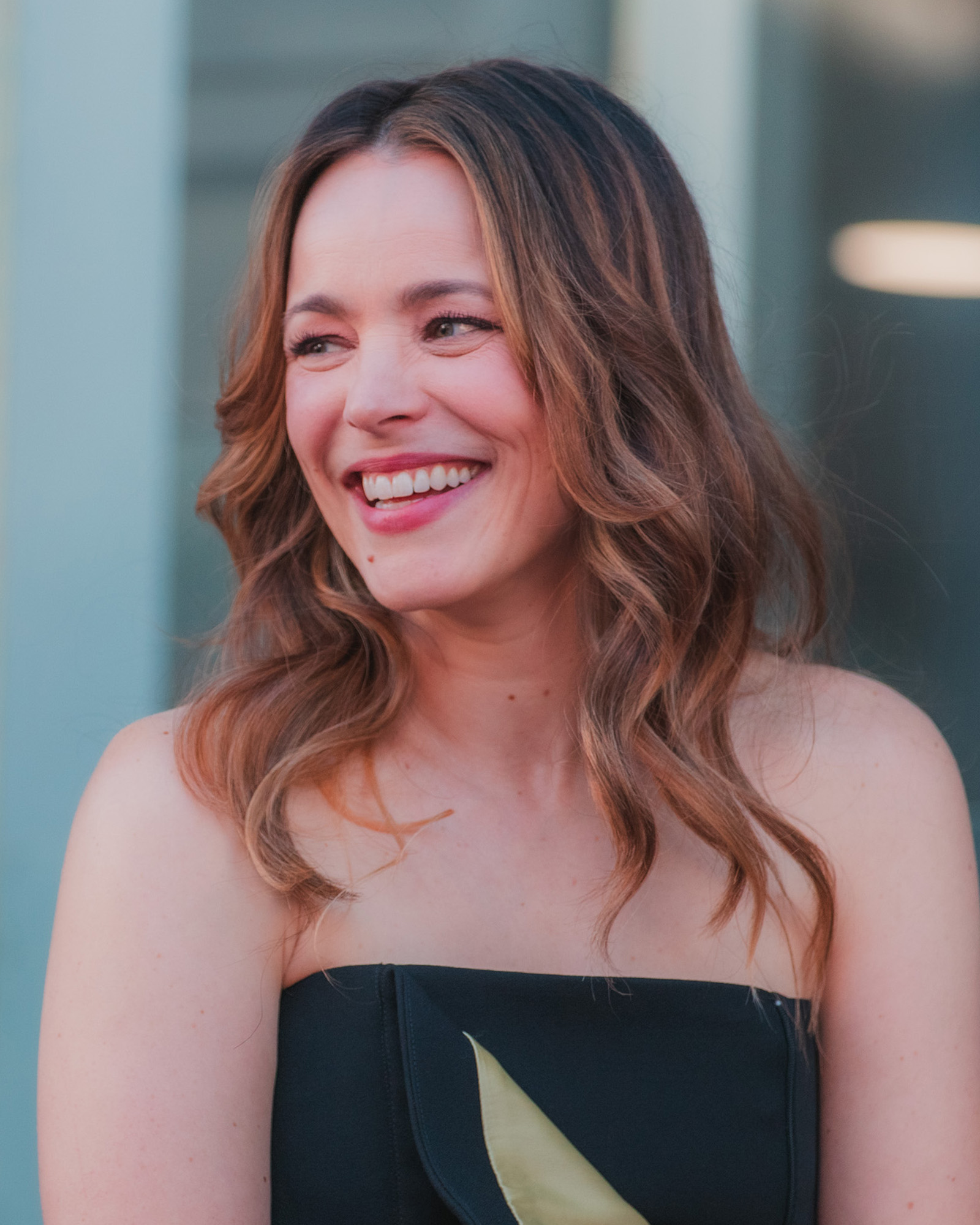
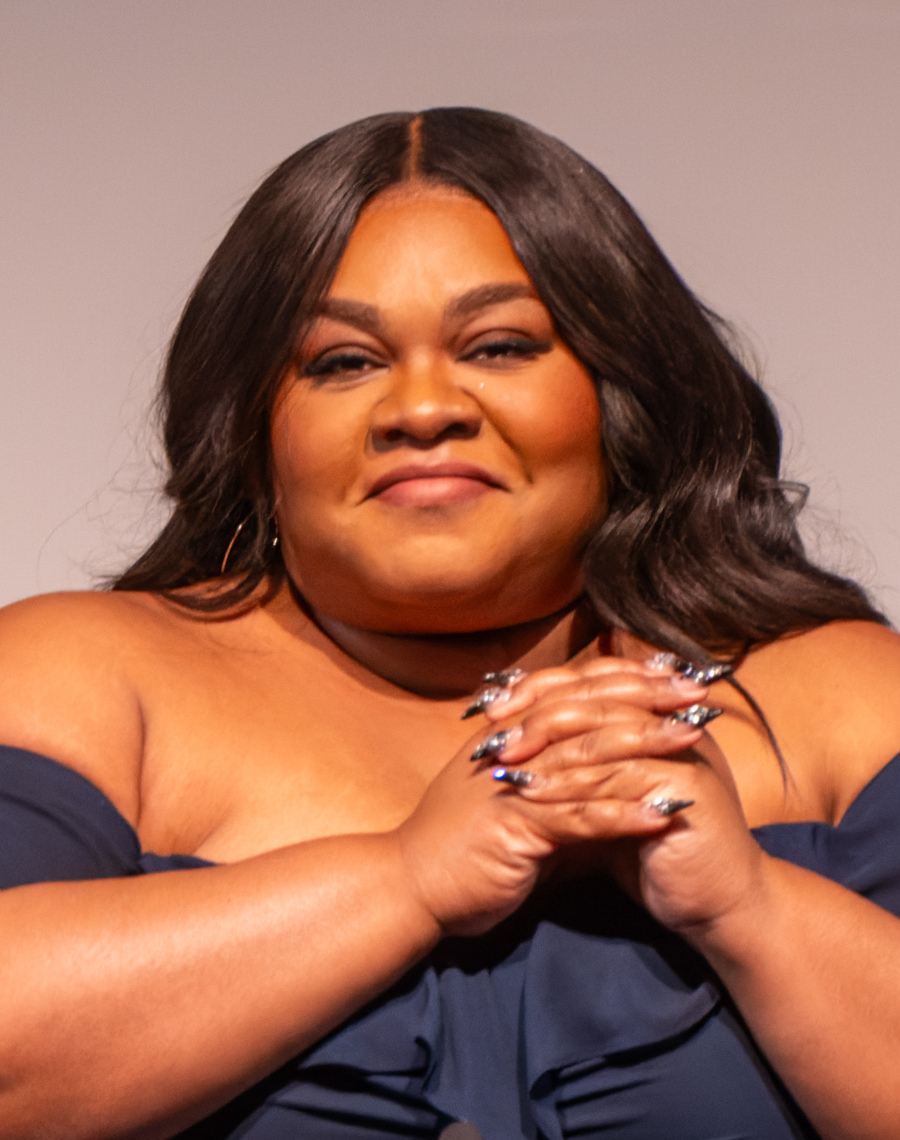
Rachel McAdams and Da'Vine Joy Randolph, Best Supporting Performance winners
- Best Film:
  - The Zone of Interest
    - Runner-up: Oppenheimer
- Best Director:
  - Jonathan Glazer – The Zone of Interest
    - Runner-up: Yorgos Lanthimos – Poor Things
- Best Lead Performance:
  - Sandra Hüller – Anatomy of a Fall and The Zone of Interest
  - Emma Stone – Poor Things
    - Runner-up: Andrew Scott – All of Us Strangers
    - Runner-up: Jeffrey Wright – American Fiction
- Best Supporting Performance:
  - Rachel McAdams – Are You There God? It's Me, Margaret.
  - Da'Vine Joy Randolph – The Holdovers
    - Runner-up: Lily Gladstone – Killers of the Flower Moon
    - Runner-up: Ryan Gosling – Barbie
- Best Screenplay:
  - Andrew Haigh – All of Us Strangers
    - Runner-up: Samy Burch – May December
- Best Cinematography:
  - Robbie Ryan – Poor Things
    - Runner-up: Rodrigo Prieto – Barbie and Killers of the Flower Moon
- Best Editing:
  - Laurent Sénéchal – Anatomy of a Fall
    - Runner-up: Jonathan Alberts – All of Us Strangers
- Best Music Score:
  - Mica Levi – The Zone of Interest (with special recognition of the contribution of sound designer Johnnie Burn)
    - Runner-up: Mark Ronson and Andrew Wyatt – Barbie
- Best Production Design:
  - Sarah Greenwood – Barbie
    - Runner-up: Shona Heath and James Price – Poor Things
- Best Foreign Language Film:
  - Anatomy of a Fall
    - Runner-up: Tótem
- Best Documentary/Non-Fiction Film:
  - Menus-Plaisirs – Les Troisgros
    - Runner-up: The Eternal Memory
- Best Animation:
  - The Boy and the Heron
    - Runner-up: Robot Dreams
- New Generation Award:
  - Celine Song – Past Lives
- Career Achievement Award:
  - Agnieszka Holland
- The Douglas Edwards Experimental/Independent Film/Video Award:
  - Wang Bing's Youth (Spring)
