= The Youth =

The Youth or The Youths may refer to:

- HaTzeirim, an Israeli political faction
- The Youth (band), a Filipino rock band
- Ijahman Levi, a Jamaican reggae singer was originally known by this name
- A song on American musical duo MGMT's first album Oracular Spectacular
- Al-Shabab (disambiguation), "The Youth", Arabic: الشباب
- The Youths (1929 film), a German silent film

== See also ==
- Wexford Youths F.C., an Irish association football club nicknamed "The Youths"
- Youth (disambiguation)
