= Distant Constellation =

Distant Constellation is a 2017 documentary film directed by Shevaun Mizrahi. It was nominated for a 2018 Independent Spirit Award and included in Film Comment's Best Undistributed Films of 2017. The film was produced by Deniz Buga and Shelly Grizim.

== Awards ==
It received many awards both in the US and internationally, including the International Documentary Association Best Cinematography Award. It is also nominated for two Cinema Eye Honor Awards. The details on the awards are below:

=== Viennale (Vienna International Film Festival) - FIPRESCI PRIZE ===
- Won: International Critics Prize Distant Constellation, 2017

=== Seville Film Festival 2017 ===
- Won: New Waves Non-fiction Award Distant Constellation, 2017

=== The 23rd annual Independent Spirit Awards Nomination ===
- Nominated: The 23rd annual Independent Spirit Awards Nomination

=== Best Picture Prize at Jeonju International Film Festival ===
- Won: Best Picture Prize at Jeonju International Film Festival 2018

=== Locarno Festival 2017 ===
- Won: Jury's Special Mention Award, 2017

Some other awards that the documentary won are:

- International Documentary Association Awards, Best Cinematography Award
- International Documentary Association Awards, Best Editing Nominee
- Cinema Eye Honors, Best Debut Film Nominee
- Cinema Eye Honors, Best Cinematography Nominee
- London Film Festival, Best Documentary Nominee
- Tacoma Film Festival, Best Documentary Award
- DokuFest, Best Film Award
- Message to Man, Best Debut Award
- Message to Man, International Federation of Film Societies Prize
- Yerevan Golden Apricot Film Festival, Best Documentary Award

== Press Coverage ==
- Indiewire wrote,

— "Distant Constellation is one of the more exciting achievements in nonfiction cinema in recent memory... Soulful, humorous, visually delicate."

- Hollywood Reporter called it,

— "A quiet gem."

- Slant Magazine wrote,

— "A master class in the art of the portrait."

- Financial Times called it,

— "A dazzling study of age and memory."

- It was Sight & Sound Film of the month. It appeared in the Sight & Sound September 2018 edition. They wrote:

— "Funny, startling and touching... Dreamlike... an unusually warm, complex and illuminating picture."
