= Youth (Henrion) =

Sculpture by Daphne Hardy Henrion

- Standing Girl
- Artist: Daphne Hardy Henrion
- Year: 1951
- Medium: Concrete, experimental medium
- Dimensions: 270 cm (9 ft)
- Location: London Museum, London, United Kingdom

Youth (also known as Standing Girl) is a figurative sculpture by Daphne Hardy Henrion. Commissioned by the architect Leonard Manasseh, it was first exhibited at the Festival of Britain in 1951. The 9ft (2.7m)–tall sculpture was originally modelled on a full-size body cast of the artist. Henrion designed the sculpture to be "a graceful and friendly personality".

Two casts of Youth were made, one from concrete and the other from an experimental material. The concrete cast was exhibited at the Festival of Britain and was later moved to Manasseh's private residence in Hampstead, where it remains. The experimental cast was owned by the Henrion family until 2019, when it was given to the London Museum. This cast remains in storage whilst it is fully restored.

The casts were made from moulds of sections of an original clay sculpture which has not survived. The cast sections were then connected into the two whole figures cast. The artist undertook this work at her Pond Street Studio.

== Exhibition at the Festival of Britain ==
Youth was displayed outside the '51 bar, designed by Manasseh, at the South Bank exhibition alongside three other large, concrete sculptures. Henrion's work was exhibited alongside that of Mitzi Cunliffe, Karel Vogel and Peter Laszlo Peri.
