= Wang Bing (director) =

Chinese film director

- Wang Bing in 2013
- Born: 16 November 1967 (age 58); Xi'an, China
- Occupation: Documentary filmmaker
- Years active: 2001–present

Wang Bing (Chinese: 王兵; pinyin: Wáng Bīng; born 1967) is a Chinese filmmaker, often referred to as one of the foremost figures in documentary film-making. Wang is the founder of his own production company, Wang Bing Studios, which produces most of his documentaries.

Most known for his 9-hour epic documentary Tie Xi Qu: West of the Tracks (2002), his Golden Leopard winner documentary Mrs. Fang (2017) and his Youth trilogy: Spring, Hard Times, and Homecoming (2023–24).

== Career ==
Wang is known for his extreme use of cinema verité. All of his films are documentaries features direct cinema techniques (without any narrator's voice-over or conventional structure), usually with lengthy running times, and following sensitive Chinese societal themes.

His first documentary, Tie Xi Qu: West of the Tracks (2002), a 9-hour epic about late 20th century industrial China, is considered his first major success, the film went on to win the Grand Prix at the Marseille Festival of Documentary Film and was shown at the Punto de Vista International Documentary Film Festival.

Wang followed with Fengming, a Chinese Memoir (2007), a 3-hour documentary about Chinese Communist Revolution aftermath, the film had its world premiere at the 2007 Cannes Film Festival, and was later shown at the 2007 Toronto International Film Festival.

His 2008 Crude Oil, a 14-hour epic documentary about oil field workers in China's Inner Mongolia, the film had its world premiere at the 2008 Rotterdam Film Festival.

His 2010 The Ditch, a 109-minute documentary about labor camps during Maoist China era, had its world premiere at the main competition of the 67th Venice International Film Festival as the film sorpresa. His following documentaries Three Sisters (2012), 'Til Madness Do Us Part (2013) and Bitter Money (2016) also had world premieres at the Venice Film Festival.

French philosopher Georges Didi-Huberman dedicated a long epilogue to Wang Bing in his 2012 book, Peuples exposés, peuples figurants. He reflects on the social fate of images thoroughly analyzing Wang's 2010 Man with No Name, writing that the director, as a humble portrait artist of a single rural worker, manages to represent the whole of China's people (as well as people from all over the World) "not through his past, nor his ideas, nor his name, nor his place in society, but through the simple gestures with which he works at his solitary life", as opposed to the common epic portraits of national identity based on military prowess, war heroes and manifest destinies.

Wang Bing attending the 70th Venice Film Festival in 2013

His 2017's Mrs. Fang had its world premiere at the main competition of the 70th Locarno Film Festival where it won the Golden Leopard.

Wang's Dead Souls (2018), an 8-hour epic about survivors of the labor camps in the Gobi Desert in Gansu, had its world premiere out of competition of 2018 Cannes Film Festival, and was met with widespread critical acclaim.

After a 5-year hiatus, Wang released the Youth trilogy, Spring, Hard Times, Homecoming (2023–2024). The documentaries had its world premiere at the main competition of the 2023 Cannes Film Festival, 77th Locarno Film Festival and 81st Venice International Film Festival, respectively.

== Personal life ==
=== Political views ===
In December 2023, alongside 50 other filmmakers, Wang Bing signed an open letter published in Libération demanding a ceasefire and an end to the killing of civilians amid the 2023 Israeli invasion of the Gaza Strip, and for a humanitarian corridor into Gaza to be established for humanitarian aid, and the release of hostages.

=== Censorship in China ===
Shortly after Wang's Youth (Homecoming) was selected for the main competition section at the 81st Venice International Film Festival, Chinese websites including Douban and Baidu Baike erased Wang's profile page and his entire filmography. News websites such as Sohu had previously reported on Wang's Golden Lion nomination, but the articles were subsequently taken offline. References to Wang on Chinese social media were also censored. At the 62nd New York Film Festival, where both Youth (Hard Times) and Youth (Homecoming) screened in the Main Slate, Wang told the audience that he did not care about China's official censorship. Previously at the 2023 International Documentary Film Festival Amsterdam, where Wang was invited as the Guest of Honor, he stated that "I'm not particularly interested in politics ... I don't want my films to become a political tool", and that he wanted to step away from "the big machine that runs in China, the process of basically making everything propaganda in a way".

== Filmography ==
Year	English Title	Chinese Title	Runtime	Notes
2002	Tie Xi Qu: West of the Tracks	铁西区	551 minutes (9:11)	
2007	Fengming, a Chinese Memoir	和凤鸣	184 minutes (3:04)	Premiered at the 60th Cannes Film Festival; Screened at the 32nd Toronto International Film Festival
2007	Brutality Factory	暴力工厂		Short in the anthology The State of the World
2008	Crude Oil	採油日記	840 minutes (14:00)	Premiered at the 2008 International Film Festival Rotterdam
2009	Coal Money	煤炭，钱	53 minutes	
2010	Man with No Name	无名者	92 minutes	
2010	The Ditch	夹边沟	109 minutes	Premiered at the 67th Venice International Film Festival; Screened at the 35th Toronto International Film Festival
2012	Three Sisters	三姊妹	153 minutes (2:33)	Premiered at the 69th Venice International Film Festival
2013	'Til Madness Do Us Part	瘋愛	228 minutes (3:48)	Premiered at the 70th Venice International Film Festival
2013	Alone	孤独	89 minutes	
2014	Father and Sons	父与子	97 minutes	
2014	Traces	遗址	30 minutes	
2016	Ta'ang	德昂	148 minutes (2:28)	Premiered at the 66th Berlin International Film Festival
2016	Bitter Money	苦錢	152 minutes (2:32)	Premiered at the 73rd Venice International Film Festival
2017	Mrs. Fang	方绣英	86 minutes	Premiered at the 70th Locarno Film Festival
2017	15 Hours	15小时	900 minutes (15:00)	Premiered at the documenta 14
2018	Dead Souls	死灵魂	495 minutes (8:15)	Premiered at the 71st Cannes Film Festival
2018	Beauty Lives in Freedom		330 minutes (5:30)	Premiered at the Asia Society
2023	Youth (Spring)	青春：春	212 minutes (3:32)	Premiered at the 76th Cannes Film Festival
2023	Man in Black	黑衣人	60 minutes	Premiered at the 76th Cannes Film Festival
2024	Youth (Hard Times)	青春：苦	227 minutes (3:47)	Premiered at the 77th Locarno Film Festival
2024	Youth (Homecoming)	青春：歸	152 minutes (2:32)	Premiered at the 81st Venice International Film Festival
TBA	I Come From Ikotun	我来自伊科通	Post-production	

== Awards and nominations ==
Award	Year	Category	Work	Result	Ref.
Asia Pacific Screen Awards	2023	Best Documentary Film	Man in Black	Nominated	
Asia Pacific Screen Awards	2024	Best Documentary Film	Youth (Homecoming)	Nominated	
Cahiers du Cinéma	2004	Annual Top 10 Lists	Tie Xi Qu: West of the Tracks	2th Place	
Cahiers du Cinéma	2010	Best Film of the 2000s	Tie Xi Qu: West of the Tracks	7th Place	
Cannes Film Festival	2018	L'Œil d'or	Dead Souls	Nominated	
Cannes Film Festival	2023	L'Œil d'or	Man in Black	Nominated	
Cannes Film Festival	2023	L'Œil d'or	Youth (Spring)	Nominated	
Cannes Film Festival	2023	Palme d'Or	Youth (Spring)	Nominated	
Doclisboa	2007	Prize IPJ University	Fengming, a Chinese Memoir	Won	
Doclisboa	2012	Grande Prémio Cidade de Lisboa	Three Sisters	Won	
Doclisboa	2014	Grande Prémio Cidade de Lisboa	Father and Sons	Won	
Dubai International Film Festival	2012	Muhr AsiaAfrica Documentary – Best Director	Three Sisters	Won	
El Gouna Film Festival	2017	Bronze Star – Documentary Competition	Mrs. Fang	Won	
Fribourg International Film Festival	2008	Prix Oikocredit Suisse	Fengming, a Chinese Memoir	Won	
Fribourg International Film Festival	2008	Special Mention (Ecumenical Jury)	Fengming, a Chinese Memoir	Won	
Fribourg International Film Festival	2008	Special Mention (FICC)	Fengming, a Chinese Memoir	Won	
Fribourg International Film Festival	2013	Regard d'or	Three Sisters	Won	
Fribourg International Film Festival	2013	Don Quijote Award	Three Sisters	Won	
Fribourg International Film Festival	2013	E-Changer Award	Three Sisters	Won	
Fribourg International Film Festival	2013	Ecumenical Jury Award	Three Sisters	Won	
IndieWire Critics Poll	2012	Best Undistributed Film	Three Sisters	10th Place	
International Cinephile Society	2024	Best Documentary	Youth (Spring)	Nominated	
Kinema Junpo	2012	Best Foreign Language Film Director	The Ditch	Won	
Las Palmas de Gran Canaria International Film Festival	2017	Golden Lady Harimaguada	Bitter Money	Won	
Locarno Film Festival	2017	Golden Leopard	Mrs. Fang	Won	
Locarno Film Festival	2024	Special Mention	Youth (Hard Times)	Won	
Locarno Film Festival	2024	FIPRESCI Prize	Youth (Hard Times)	Won	
Locarno Film Festival	2024	Environment is Quality of Life Prize	Youth (Hard Times)	Won	
Los Angeles Film Critics Association	2023	Douglas Edwards Experimental Film Award	Youth (Spring)	Won	
Marseille Festival of Documentary Film	2003	Grand Prix	Tie Xi Qu: West of the Tracks	Won	
Nantes Three Continents Film Festival	2003	Documentary Montgolfière d’Or	Tie Xi Qu: West of the Tracks	Won	
Nantes Three Continents Film Festival	2012	Montgolfière d’Or	Three Sisters	Won	
Nantes Three Continents Film Festival	2012	Audience Award	Three Sisters	Won	
Nantes Three Continents Film Festival	2013	Montgolfière d’Argent	'Til Madness Do Us Part	Won	
Taipei Golden Horse Awards	2023	Best Documentary Feature	Youth (Spring)	Won	
Taipei Golden Horse Awards	2024	Best Documentary Feature	Youth (Hard Times)	Nominated	
Valladolid International Film Festival	2024	Time of History Grand Prize	Youth (Hard Times)	Won	
Venice Film Festival	2010	Golden Lion	The Ditch	Nominated	
Venice Film Festival	2012	Orizzonti Award for Best Film	Three Sisters	Won	
Venice Film Festival	2016	Orizzonti Award for Best Screenplay	Bitter Money	Won	
Venice Film Festival	2016	Human Rights Film Network Award	Bitter Money	Won	
Venice Film Festival	2024	Golden Lion	Youth (Homecoming)	Nominated	
Yamagata International Documentary Film Festival	2003	Robert and Frances Flaherty Prize	Tie Xi Qu: West of the Tracks	Won	
Yamagata International Documentary Film Festival	2007	Robert and Frances Flaherty Prize	Fengming, a Chinese Memoir	Won	
Yamagata International Documentary Film Festival	2019	Robert and Frances Flaherty Prize	Dead Souls	Won	
Yamagata International Documentary Film Festival	2019	Citizens’ Prize	Dead Souls	Won	
