= Dead Souls (2018 film) =

- Film poster
- Traditional Chinese: 死靈魂
- Simplified Chinese: 死灵魂
- Directed by: Wang Bing
- Written by: Wang Bing
- Produced by: Serge Lalou; Camille Laemmle; Louise Prince; Wang Bing
- Cinematography: Wang Bing; Xiaohui Shan; Yang Song; Liu Xianhui
- Edited by: Catherine Rascon
- Production company: Les Films d’Ici
- Distributed by: Icarus Films; Grasshopper Film
- Release date: 9 May 2018 (Cannes Film Festival)
- Running time: 495 minutes
- Countries: France; Switzerland
- Language: Mandarin

Dead Souls is a 2018 documentary film directed by Wang Bing and documents the testimony of survivors of the hard-labor camp in the Gobi Desert in Gansu, China. The film was shot from 2005 to 2017 and covers most of China's provinces, visiting more than 120 survivors of the Jiabiangou and Mingshui reeducation camps, which were set up by China's Communist regime in the late 1950s. The film premiered at the 2018 Cannes Film Festival.

== Reception ==
On the review aggregator website Rotten Tomatoes, 100% of 21 critics' reviews are positive. The website's consensus reads: "Dead Souls excavates a government's sins with personal accounts that preserve the past while illuminating the problems of the present." Metacritic, which uses a weighted average, assigned the film a score of 89 out of 100, based on nine critics, indicating "universal acclaim".

Owen Gleiberman of Variety wrote, "An eight-hour-and-15-minute documentary is not something you walk into lightly, especially when its subject is the imprisonment and slow-motion murder of human beings. But Wang Bing's Dead Souls is a powerfully sobering and clear-eyed investigation that justifies its length through the gravity and presence of its testimony. Wang, like Claude Lanzmann in Shoah, isn't just making a historical documentary; he's using oral memoir to forge an artifact of history."

Clarence Tsui of The Hollywood Reporter wrote that the film "is thoroughly focused and tightly structured. And it is an immensely perceptive piece about the history of China and its multitude of discontents."

== See also ==
- List of longest films
- Anti-Rightist Movement
- Laogai
- Re-education through labor
