= Youth (Homecoming) =

2024 documentary directed by Wang Bing

- Promotional release poster
- Chinese: 青春：归
- Directed by: Wang Bing
- Produced by: Sonia Buchman; Mao Hui; Nicolas R. de la Mothe; Vincent Wang
- Cinematography: Shan Xiaohui; Song Yang; Ding Bihan; Liu Xianhui; Maeda Yoshitaka; Wang Bing
- Edited by: Dominique Auvray; Xu Bingyuan; Liyo Gong
- Production companies: House on Fire; Gladys Glover; CS Production; Arte France Cinéma; Les Films Fauves; Volya Films; Eastern-Lion Pictures and Culture Media Co.; Beijing Contemporary Art Foundation; Le Fresnoy
- Distributed by: Pyramide (Worldwide)
- Release date: 6 September 2024 (Venice)
- Running time: 152 minutes
- Countries: China; France; Luxembourg; Netherlands
- Language: Mandarin

Youth (Homecoming) (Chinese: 青春：归; pinyin: Qīngchūn: Gui) is a 2024 internationally co-produced documentary film directed by Wang Bing. It's the third installment in the director's Youth trilogy, about young Chinese textile industry workers, following 2023's Youth (Spring) and 2024's Youth (Hard Times).

The film had its world premiere at the 81st Venice International Film Festival, where it was the only documentary competing for the Golden Lion.

== Premise ==
Textile workshops in Zhili slow their operation for the New Year's holiday, with many workers returning home. Shi Wei and Fang Lingping both get married over the break, with the latter's new husband, an information technology specialist, planning to join his new bride in Zhili.

== Release ==
Youth (Homecoming) premiered in September 2024 as a main competition entry at that year's Venice Film Festival. It follows the release of the prior films in the trilogy; Youth (Spring) debuted at the 2023 Cannes Film Festival, while Youth (Hard Times) premiered at the 77th Locarno Film Festival in August 2024.

== Reception ==
=== Critical response ===
On the review aggregator website Rotten Tomatoes, 94% of 17 critics' reviews are positive. Metacritic, which uses a weighted average, assigned the film a score of 81 out of 100, based on 7 critics, indicating "universal acclaim".

=== Accolades ===
Award	Ceremony date	Category	Recipient(s)	Result	Ref.
Venice Film Festival	7 September 2024	Golden Lion	Youth (Homecoming)	Nominated	
Asia Pacific Screen Awards	30 November 2024	Best Documentary Film	Wang Bing, Sonia Buchman, Mao Hui, Nicolas R De La Mothe, Vincent Wang	Nominated	
