= Mrs. Fang =

Chinese name
- Simplified Chinese: 方绣英
Transcriptions
- Directed by: Wang Bing
- Written by: Wang Bing
- Produced by: Pierre-Olivier Bardet, Yang Wang, Kong Lihong
- Cinematography: Wang Bing, Shan Xiaohui, Ding Bihan
- Edited by: Wang Bing, Dominique Auvray
- Release date: 8 August 2017 (Locarno Festival)
- Running time: 86 minutes
- Country: China
- Language: Mandarin

Mrs. Fang is a 2017 documentary film directed by Chinese director Wang Bing. It chronicles the last 10 days of the life of Fang Xiuying, a bedridden 68-year-old woman who has advanced Alzheimer's disease. It won Golden Leopard at the 2017 Locarno Festival.
