= Yang Xianhui =

Chinese novelist

Yang Xianhui (Chinese: 杨显惠; pinyin: Yáng Xiǎnhuì; born 1946) is a contemporary Chinese novelist. His fiction portrays life during the Anti-Rightist Campaign and the Great Chinese Famine. His fiction is constructed from interviews with inhabitants of the Chinese prison system and recollections of his own time as a rusticated youth.

== Major works ==
- Zhe yi pian da hai nan《這一片大海灘》 (The long beach).
- Jia bian gou ji shi《夹边沟记事》 (Memory of Jiabiangou). This documentary novel - often referred to as the "Gulag Archipelago of China," - tells 20 vivid stories from the survivors of the Jiabiangou labor camp, a place full of hunger, suffering, despair, and death. There were approximately 3,000 people detained in 1957; less than half survived until the end of 1960.
- Ding xi gu er yuan ji shi 《定西孤儿院纪事》 (Records of Dingxi Orphanage). The Dingxi District was a disaster area in Gansu Province during the "Great Famine" around 1960. The author painted the tragic scenes of hunger and death faced by young children, emerging through his documentary language and calm tones.
- Gao bie jia bian gou《告別夾邊溝》, translated as "Women from Shanghai".
- Gan nan ji shi《甘南紀事》 (Memory of Gannan).
