= Miki Polonski =

Israeli film director and screenwriter

Miki Polonski (Hebrew: מיקי פולונסקי; born 1982) is an Israeli film director and screenwriter.

Born in Bat Yam, Israel, in 2015 he graduated from the Film Department of Minshar School of Art in Tel Aviv.

Polonski directed a number of internationally awarded short films. His 2015 film Ten Buildings Away was selected for the 68th Festival de Cannes’ Cinéfondation competition. The same year he won the Best Student Film award in DocAviv and Best Student film award in the Israeli Documentary Filmmakers’ Forum competition for documentary film 1 Building and 40 People Dancing. In 2017 his short film Shmama won the Pardino d’argento Award at the 70th Locarno Film Festival, while his first short film, Albina 12, was nominated for the Israeli Academy Awards.
