= Shevaun Mizrahi =

Turkish-American documentary filmmaker

Shevaun Mizrahi is a Turkish-American documentary filmmaker. She received a Jury Special Mention Award at the Locarno Film Festival 2017 for her documentary film Distant Constellation among many other awards including the Best Picture Prize at the Jeonju International Film Festival 2018 and the FIPRESCI Critics Prize at the Viennale (Vienna International Film Festival) 2018. Indiewire wrote, “Distant Constellation is one of the more exciting achievements in nonfiction cinema in recent memory." She was named one of Filmmaker Magazine's 25 New Faces of Film in 2015 and is the recipient of a 2018 Guggenheim Fellowship. In December 2018, she received the Best Cinematography Award from the International Documentary Association.

== Biography ==
Mizrahi grew up in Boston, Massachusetts. She received her undergraduate education in cognitive neuroscience and English literature from the University of Pennsylvania. She graduated in fine arts from the film school at the New York University.

== Awards ==
=== Viennale (Vienna International Film Festival) - FIPRESCI PRIZE ===
- Won: International Critics Prize Distant Constellation, 2017

=== Seville Film Festival 2017 ===
- Won: New Waves Non-fiction Award Distant Constellation, 2017

=== The 22nd annual Truer Than Fiction Award ===
- Nominated: 22nd Jeep Truer Than Fiction Award Distant Constellation, 2018

=== Guggenheim Foundation 2018 Fellow ===
- Won: Guggenheim Foundation 2018 Fellowship under CREATIVE ARTS (Film-video)

=== Best Picture Prize at Jeonju International Film Festival ===
- Won: Best Picture Prize at Jeonju International Film Festival 2018

=== Locarno Festival 2017 Won ===
- Won: Jury's Special Mention Award, 2017

=== Golden Apricot Yerevan International Film Festival ===
- Won: Best Documentary Prize at the Golden Apricot Yerevan International Film Festival.

Some other awards that she won are:

- International Documentary Association Awards, Best Cinematography Award
- International Documentary Association Awards, Best Editing Nominee
- Cinema Eye Honors, Best Debut Film Nominee
- Cinema Eye Honors, Best Cinematography Nominee
- London Film Festival, Best Documentary Nominee
- Tacoma Film Festival, Best Documentary Award
- DokuFest, Best Film Award
- Message to Man, Best Debut Award
- Message to Man, International Federation of Film Societies Prize
- Yerevan Golden Apricot Film Festival, Best Documentary Award

== Filmography ==
- Myanmar Hotel (2009)
- Distant Constellation (2017)
