= Bitter Money =

2016 Chinese documentary film directed by Wang Bing

- Directed by: Wang Bing
- Written by: Wang Bing
- Edited by: Dominique Auvray; Wang Bing
- Release date: 2016
- Running time: 152 minutes
- Country: China
- Language: Chinese

Bitter Money (Chinese: 苦錢) is a 2016 Chinese documentary film directed by Wang Bing.

The film analyzes the lives of migrant workers in Huzhou's clothing factories. It premiered at the 73rd edition of the Venice Film Festival, in the Orizzonti competition, in which it was awarded for best screenplay.

== Plot ==
The film follows two cousins as they leave their rural homes to work in Huzhou, a city with over ten thousand clothing factories. They work long hours in harsh conditions for little money, while living in a cramped dormitory. The documentary captures the cruel reality, showing their daily struggles, unfair working conditions, and dreams of a future.

== Reception ==
On the review aggregator website Rotten Tomatoes, 89% of 9 critics' reviews are positive, with an average rating of 7.9/10. Metacritic assigned the film a score of 75 out of 100, based on 4 critics, indicating "generally favorable" reviews.
