= Bagur, Karnataka =

Coordinates: 13°01′N 76°23′E

Bagur, also known as Sannakki Baguru is a village located in Hosadurga Taluk, Chitradurga district, Karnataka, India.it is one greater in hosadurga taluk In This village have a 101 temples, The village contains 101 wells also, Reddy gownder community people having major population in this village, Sri prasanna Channakeshava temple built by Hoysala emperors is the main attraction of this village.

== History ==
Bagur village has several historical temples (13°49'13"N 76°11'40"E) which are in a state of neglect. It is believed that the village had 101 temples before 20th Century. The village is also known as Sannakki Bagur highlighting the good quality small rice grown in the village with tank water.

== Amenities ==
Bagur village has a post office with pin code 577515. The village has a higher primary school established in 1927 C.E. by Government Departments.
