= Youth (Hard Times) =

2024 documentary directed by Wang Bing

- Promotional release poster
- Chinese: 青春：苦
- Directed by: Wang Bing
- Produced by: Sonia Buchman; Mao Hui; Nicolas R. de la Mothe; Vincent Wang
- Cinematography: Shan Xiaohui; Song Yang; Ding Bihan; Liu Xianhui; Maeda Yoshitaka; Wang Bing
- Edited by: Dominique Auvray; Xu Bingyuan; Liyo Gong
- Production companies: House on Fire; Gladys Glover; CS Production; Arte France Cinéma; Les Films Fauves; Volya Films; Eastern-Lion Pictures and Culture Media Co.; Beijing Contemporary Art Foundation; Le Fresnoy
- Release date: 13 August 2024 (Locarno)
- Running time: 227 minutes
- Countries: China; France; Luxembourg; Netherlands
- Language: Mandarin

Youth (Hard Times) (Chinese: 青春：苦; pinyin: qīng chūn ku) is a 2024 documentary film directed by Wang Bing. It is the second entry in the director's Youth trilogy, about young Chinese textile industry workers, after the 2023 documentary Youth (Spring).

The film had its world premiere at the International Competition of the 77th Locarno Film Festival, where it competed for the Golden Leopard, and was awarded a Special Mention and the FIPRESCI Prize. It was followed by Youth (Homecoming), also released in 2024.

== Premise ==
Tensions surface between workers and factory owners in multiple textile workshops in Zhili.

== Release ==
Youth (Hard Times) premiered on 13 August 2024 at the Locarno Film Festival. The third and final installment in the trilogy, Youth (Homecoming), debuted at the 81st Venice International Film Festival in September 2024.

== Reception ==
=== Critical response ===
On the review aggregator website Rotten Tomatoes, 94% of 16 critics' reviews are positive. Metacritic, which uses a weighted average, assigned the film a score of 84 out of 100, based on 8 critics, indicating "universal acclaim".

=== Accolades ===
Award	Ceremony date	Category	Recipient(s)	Result	Ref.
Locarno Film Festival	17 August 2024	Golden Leopard	Youth (Hard Times)	Special mention	
Locarno Film Festival	17 August 2024	FIPRESCI Prize	Youth (Hard Times)	Won	
Locarno Film Festival	17 August 2024	Junior Jury Award, Environment is Quality of Life Prize	Youth (Hard Times)	Won	
Taipei Golden Horse Awards	23 November 2024	Best Documentary Feature	Youth (Hard Times)	Nominated	
