= Tie Xi Qu: West of the Tracks =

2002 film by Wang Bing

- French release poster
- Traditional Chinese: 鐵西區
- Simplified Chinese: 铁西区
- Literal meaning: district west of the railroad
- Hanyu Pinyin: Tiěxī Qū
- Directed by: Wang Bing
- Produced by: Wang Bing; Zhu Zhu
- Cinematography: Wang Bing
- Edited by: Wang Bing; Adam Kerdy
- Release date: 2002
- Running time: 551 minutes
- Country: China
- Language: Northeastern Mandarin

Tie Xi Qu: West of the Tracks (Mandarin: [tʰjè ɕí tɕʰý], 铁西区, Tiě xī qū) is a 2002 Chinese documentary film by Wang Bing. Over nine hours long, the film consists of three parts: "Rust," "Remnants" and "Rails."

Tie Xi Qu was filmed over the course of two years between 1999 and 2001 and details the slow decline of Shenyang's industrial Tiexi district in the midst of unemployment crisis known as "Xiagang" (meaning to step down from the post). This area was once a vibrant example of China's socialist economy. With the rise of the free market and the move towards other industries, however, the factories of Tiexi have all begun to be closed down, with them much of the district's worker-based infrastructure and social constructs.

Although Tie Xi Qu: West of the Tracks is rarely screened due to its length, many critics have named it one of the best and most important films of the 2000s.

== Synopsis ==
=== "Rust" ===
The first portion, "Rust", follows a group of factory workers in three state-run factories: a smelting plant, an electric cable factory and a sheet metal factory. Workers of all three are hindered by sub-standard equipment, hazardous waste, and a lack of safety precautions. Perhaps even worse, the declining need for heavy industry results in a constant shortage of raw materials, leaving the workers idle and concerned for their future. In Chinese, this section is called 工廠 (gōngchǎng), meaning "factory".

=== "Remnants" ===
The second part, "Remnants", follows the families of many of the workers in an old state-run housing block, "Rainbow Row." In particular, Wang focuses on the teenage children who concern themselves with their own lives but must also cope with their inevitable displacement as Tie Xi's factories continue to close down. In Chinese, this section is called 艳粉街 (Yànfěn Jiē), meaning "Yanfen Street", the name of a street in Tiexi.

=== "Rails" ===
The third part, "Rails", narrows its focus to a single father and son who scavenge the rail yards in order to sell raw parts to the factories. With the factories closing, however, their future suddenly becomes uncertain. In Chinese, this section is called 铁路 (tiělù), meaning "railway."

== Reception ==
In a 2012 poll by the British Film Institute, eight critics named it one of the 10 greatest films ever made. In the 2022 poll, 17 critics ranked it among the top 10 films ever made, putting it at a rank of 157 (tied with several other films) on the 2022 Sight and Sound Critics' poll.

In 2025, the film was showcased in the section 'Decisive Moments in Asian Cinema' at the 30th Busan International Film Festival, as part of the special "Asian Cinema 100", being the signature work of the director Wang Bing.

== See also ==
- List of longest films
