= 25th Busan International Film Festival =

2020 edition of film festival

- Official poster
- Opening film: Septet: The Story of Hong Kong
- Closing film: Josee, the Tiger and the Fish
- Location: Busan Cinema Center
- Founded: 1995
- Awards: New Currents Award: A Balance by Harumoto Yujiro; Three by Pak Ruslan; Kim Jiseok Award: Drowning In Holy Water by Navid Mahmoudi; The Slaughterhouse by Abbas Amini
- No. of films: 192 films from 68 countries
- Festival date: October 21–30, 2020

Busan International Film Festival
- 26th 24th

The 25th Busan International Film Festival took place on October 21 to 30, 2020 at the Busan Cinema Center in Busan, South Korea. A total of 192 films from 68 countries were screened at the festival, the numbers reduced from the previous edition.

The festival was scheduled to be held on October 7–16, 2020, but was postponed due to concern over the spread of COVID-19 after Chuseok holidays. Due to the COVID-19 pandemic, the attendance of BIFF had been downsized and no international guests were invited to the festival. All outdoor events were also cancelled in order to prevent crowds. The screening limit capacity were only up to 50 people. The judging of all films took place online.

The most prestigious awards of the festival, New Currents, were handed to A Balance and Three.

== Juries ==
=== New Currents ===
- Mira Nair, Indian-American director, Head Juror
- Thierry Jobin, Swiss film critic, Fribourg International Film Festival artistic director
- Haegue Yang, South Korean visual artist

=== Kim Jiseok Award ===
- Zhao Tao, Chinese actress
- Jung Sung-il, South Korean film critic and director
- Mouly Surya, Indonesian director

=== BIFF Mecenat Award ===
- Nick Deocampo, Filipino director
- Park Inho, South Korean film critic
- Chalida Uabumrungjit, Thai archive director

=== Sonje Award ===
- Ifa Isfansyah, Indonesian director
- Kim Yi-seok, South Korean film professor
- Sharipa Urazbayeva, Uzbekistani director

=== Actor and Actress of the Year ===
- Chu Sang-mi, South Korean actress and director
- Jung Jin-young, South Korean actor and director

=== FIPRESCI Award ===
- Sanja Struna, Slovenian film critic
- Sung Il-kwon, South Korean film critic
- Alin Taciyan, FIPRESCI deputy secretary

=== NETPAC Award ===
- Riccardo Gelli, Florence Korean Film Festival director
- Kim Kyoung-wook, South Korean film critic
- Hassan Muthalib, Malaysian writer, film critic, and film historian

=== DGK Megabox Award ===
- Kim Ho-jun, South Korean director
- Lee Sang-cheol, South Korean director
- Cho Chang-ho, South Korean director

=== KBS Independent Film Award ===
- Jeong Jae-eun, South Korean director
- Ju Sung-chul, South Korean film critic
- Kwak Sin-ae, South Korean film producer

=== CGK&SamyangXEEN Award ===
- Nam Dong-keun, South Korean cinematographer
- Park Jung-hun, South Korean cinematographer
- Sung Seung-taek, South Korean cinematographer

== Official selection ==
=== Opening and closing films ===
English title	Original title	Director(s)	Production countrie(s)
Josee, the Tiger and the Fish (closing film)	ジョゼと虎と魚たち	Kotaro Tamura	Japan
Septet: The Story of Hong Kong (opening film)	七人樂隊	Ann Hui, Patrick Tam, Yuen Woo-ping, Johnnie To, Ringo Lam, Hark Tsui, Sammo Hung	Hong Kong, China

=== Gala Presentation ===
English title	Original title	Director(s)	Production countrie(s)
In the Mood for Love	花樣年華	Wong Kar-wai	Hong Kong, China
Love After Love	第一爐香	Ann Hui	China
Minari		Lee Isaac Chung	United States
True Mothers	朝が来る	Naomi Kawase	Japan
Wife of a Spy	スパイの妻	Kiyoshi Kurosawa	Japan

=== Icons ===
English title	Original title	Director(s)	Production countrie(s)
A Night in Haifa	Laila in Haifa	Amos Gitai	Israel, France
Another Round	Druk	Thomas Vinterberg	Denmark
City Hall		Frederick Wiseman	United States
Days	日子	Tsai Ming-liang	Taiwan
Dear Comrades!	Дорогие товарищи	Andrei Konchalovsky	Russia
First Cow		Kelly Reichardt	United States
Hopper/Welles		Orson Welles	United States
Minamata Mandala	水俣曼荼羅	Kazuo Hara	Japan
New Order	Nuevo orden	Michel Franco	Mexico, France
Sun Children	خورشید	Majid Majidi	Iran
Swimming Out Till the Sea Turns Blue	一直游到海水变蓝	Jia Zhangke	China
The Salt of Tears	Le Sel des larmes	Philippe Garrel	France, Switzerland
The Woman Who Ran	도망친 여자	Hong Sang-soo	South Korea
Undine		Christian Petzold	Germany, France

=== A Window on Asian Cinema ===
English title	Original title	Director(s)	Production countrie(s)
18 Kilohertz	18 килогерц	Farkhat Sharipov	Kazakhstan
200 Meters	٢٠٠ متر	Ameen Nayfeh	Palestine, Jordan, Qatar, Italy, Sweden
A'hr	കയറ്റം	Sanal Kumar Sasidharan	India
All the Things We Never Said	生きちゃった	Yuya Ishii	Japan
Bittersweet	बिटर स्वीट	Ananth Narayan Mahadevan	India
Captive	नजरबंद	Suman Mukhopadhyay	India
Cleaners		Glenn Barit	Philippines
Coalesce	Les affluents	Jessé Miceli	Cambodia, France
Death of Nintendo		Raya Martin	Philippines, United States
Drowning in Holy Water †	مردن در آب مطهر	Navid Mahmoudi	Afghanistan, Iran
Everyday Is a Lullaby		Putrama Tuta	Indonesia
Farida's 2000 Songs	Фариданинг икки минг қўшиғи	Yalkin Tuychiev	Uzbekistan
Happy Old Year	ฮาวทูทิ้ง..ทิ้งอย่างไรไม่ให้เหลือเธอ	Nawapol Thamrongrattanarit	Thailand
Killer Spider	عنکبوت	Ebrahim Irajzade	Iran
Little Big Women	孤味	Joseph Chen-Chieh Hsu	Taiwan
Living In Your Sky	空に住む	Shinji Aoyama	Japan
Mama	妈妈和七天的时间	Li Dongmei	China, France
Matto's Bicycle	Matto Ki Saikal	M. Gani	India
Milestone	मील पत्थर - Milestone	Ivan Ayr	India
Ora, Ora Be Goin' Alone	おらおらでひとりいぐも	Shuichi Okita	Japan
Sister Sister	Chị Chị Em Em	Kathy Uyen	Vietnam
Soirée	ソワレ	Bunji Sotoyama	Japan
Striding Into the Wind	野马分鬃	Wei Shujun	China
The Disciple		Chaitanya Tamhane	India
The Paper Tigers		Quoc Bao Tran	Vietnam
The Salt in Our Waters	নোনা জলের কাব্য	Rezwan Shahriar Sumit	Bangladesh, France
The Slaughterhouse †	کشتارگاه	Abbas Amini	Iran
There Is No Evil	شیطان وجود ندارد	Mohammad Rasoulof	Iran, Germany
Tiong Bahru Social Club		Bee Thiam Tan	Singapore
Where Is Pinki?	Pinki Elli?	Prithvi Konanur	India
Wind	随风飘散	Dadren Wanggyal	China
Yellow Cat	Сары мысық	Adilkhan Yerzhanov	Kazakhstan
Your Eyes Tell	きみの瞳が問いかけている	Takahiro Miki	Japan

Highlighted titles and daggers (†) indicate Kim Joseok Award winners.

=== New Currents ===
English title	Original title	Director(s)	Production countrie(s)
A Balance †	由宇子の天秤	Yujiro Harumoto	Japan
A Leave	휴가	Lee Ran-hee	South Korea
Bilesuvar		Elvin Adigozel	Azerbaijan, France
Butterfly on the Windowpane	ऐना झ्यालको पुतली	Sujit Bidari	Nepal
Chnchik		Aram Shahbazyan	Armenia, Germany, Netherlands
Harami	हरामी	Shyam Madiraju	India, United States
Money Has Four Legs	ခြေလေးချောင်	Maung Sun	Myanmar
Snowball # ↓	최선의 삶	Lee Woo-jung	South Korea
Summer Blur ‡	汉南夏日	Han Shuai	China
Three †	Tpu	Ruslan Pak	Kazakhstan, South Korea, Uzbekistan

Highlighted titles and daggers (†) indicate New Currents winners.
Highlighted title and double-dagger (‡) indicate FIPRESCI Award winner.
Hashtag (#) indicates KTH Award winner.
Down-arrow (↓) indicates CGK&SamyangXEEN Award winner.

=== Korean Cinema Today ===
==== Panorama ====
English title	Original title	Director(s)	Production countrie(s)
Beasts Clawing at Straws	지푸라기라도 잡고 싶은 짐승들	Kim Yong-hoon	South Korea
CICADA	매미소리	Lee Chung-ryoul	South Korea
Days of Green	청산, 유수	Shin Dong-il	South Korea
Deliver Us from Evil	다만 악에서 구하소서	Hong Won-chan	South Korea
Empty Body	인간증명	Kim Ui-seok	South Korea
Everglow	빛나는 순간	So Joon-moon	South Korea
Me and Me	사라진 시간	Jung Jin-young	South Korea
More Than Family	애비규환	Choi Ha-na	South Korea
Peninsula	반도	Yeon Sang-ho	South Korea
Spring Song	스프링 송	Yoo Jun-sang	South Korea
Steel Rain 2: Summit	강철비 2: 정상회담	Yang Woo-suk	South Korea
The Man Standing Next	남산의 부장들	Woo Min-ho	South Korea
Three Sisters	세자매	Lee Seung-won	South Korea
Time to Hunt	사냥의 시간	Yoon Sung-hyun	South Korea
Vestige	달이 지는 밤	Kim Jong-hwan, Jang Kun-jae	South Korea

==== Vision ====
English title	Original title	Director(s)	Production countrie(s)
And There Was Light	온 세상이 하얗다	Kim Ji-seok	South Korea
Beyond You	그대 너머에	Park Hong-min	South Korea
Fighter †	파이터	Jéro Yun	South Korea
Good Person ‡ §	좋은 사람	Jung Wook	South Korea
Limecrime ↑	라임크라임	Lee Seung-hwan, Yoo Jae-wook	South Korea
Our Joyful Summer Days	기쁜 우리 여름날	Lee Yu-bin	South Korea
Our Midnight	아워 미드나잇	Lim Jung-eun	South Korea
Short Vacation	종착역	Kwon Min-pyo, Seo Han-sol	South Korea
The Slug	태어나길 잘했어	Choi Jin-young	South Korea
Young Adult Matters ‡ #	어른들은 몰라요	Lee Hwan	South Korea

Highlighted title and dagger (†) indicate NETPAC Award winner.
Highlighted titles and double-daggers (‡) indicate DGK MEGABOX Award winners.
Section sign (§) indicates CGV Arthouse Award winner.
Hashtag (#) indicates KTH Award winner.
Up-arrow (↑) indicates KBS Independent Film Award winner.

=== World Cinema ===
English title	Original title	Director(s)	Production countrie(s)
All Hands on Deck	À l'abordage!	Guillaume Brac	France
Ammonite		Francis Lee	United Kingdom, Australia, United States
And Tomorrow the Entire World	Und morgen die ganze Welt	Julia von Heinz	Germany, France
Beginning	Დასაწყისი	Dea Kulumbegashvili	France, Georgia
Berlin Alexanderplatz		Burhan Qurbani	Germany
Death Knell	Hil kanpaiak	Imanol Rayo	Spain
Digger		Georgis Grigorakis	Greece, France
Falling		Viggo Mortensen	Canada, United Kingdom, Denmark
Gagarine		Fanny Liatard, Jérémy Trouilh	France
I Carry You with Me		Heidi Ewing	Mexico, United States
I Met a Girl		Luke Eve	Australia
I Never Cry	Jak najdalej stąd	Piotr Domalewski	Poland, Ireland
Ibrahim		Samir Guesmi	France
In the Dusk	Sutemose	Šarūnas Bartas	Lithuania, France, Czech Republic, Serbia, Portugal, Latvia
La fortaleza		Jorge Thielen Armand	Venezuela, France, Netherlands, Colombia
La Verónica		Leo Medel	Chile
Listen		Ana Rocha de Sousa	United Kingdom, Portugal
Love Affair(s)	Les choses qu'on dit, les choses qu'on fait	Emmanuel Mouret	France
Lowdown Dirty Criminals		Paul Murphy	New Zealand
Mandibles	Mandibules	Quentin Dupieux	France, Belgium
My Favorite War	Mans mīļākais karš	Ilze Burkovska-Jacobsen	Norway, Latvia
My Tender Matador	Tengo miedo torero	Rodrigo Sepúlveda	Chile, Argentina, Mexico
Night of the Kings	La Nuit des rois	Philippe Lacôte	Ivory Coast, France, Canada, Senegal
Nowhere Special		Uberto Pasolini	United Kingdom, Italy, Romania
Padrenostro		Claudio Noce	Italy
Passion Simple		Danielle Arbid	France, Belgium
Preparations to Be Together for an Unknown Period of Time	Felkészülés meghatározatlan ideig tartó együttlétre	Lili Horvát	Hungary
Quo Vadis, Aida?		Jasmila Žbanić	Bosnia and Herzegovina, Austria, Romania, Netherlands, Germany, Poland, France, Norway, Turkey
Rascal	Vaurien	Peter Dourountzis	France
Red Soil	Rouge	Farid Bentoumi	France
Saint-Narcisse		Bruce LaBruce	Canada
She Dies Tomorrow		Amy Seimetz	United States
Shorta		Anders Ølholm, Frederik Louis Hviid	Denmark
Slalom		Charlène Favier	France
Spring Blossom	Seize printemps	Suzanne Lindon	France
Teddy		Ludovic Boukherma, Zoran Boukherma	France
The Best Families	Las mejores familias	Javier Fuentes-León	Peru, Colombia
The Death of Cinema and My Father Too	מותו של הקולנוע ושל אבא שלי גם	Dani Rosenberg	Israel
The Third War	La Troisième Guerre	Giovanni Aloi	France
The Works and Days (of Tayoko Shiojiri in the Shiotani Basin)		C.W. Winter, Anders Edström	United States, Sweden, Japan, United Kingdom
Tragic Jungle	Selva Trágica	Yulene Olaizola	Mexico, France, Colombia
Zanka Contact		Ismaël el Iraki	France, Morocco, Belgium

=== Flash Forward ===
English title	Original title	Director(s)	Production countrie(s)
Beasts	La terre des hommes	Naël Marandin	France
Emptiness	Vacío	Paúl Venegas	Ecuador, Uruguay
Nadia, Butterfly		Pascal Plante	Canada
Palmyra	Пальмира	Ivan Bolotnikov	Russia
Rival	Rivale	Marcus Lenz	Germany
The Art of Dying Far Away	A Arte de Morrer Longe	Júlio Alves	Portugal
The Macaluso Sisters	Le sorelle Macaluso	Emma Dante	Italy
The Predators	I predatori	Pietro Castellitto	Italy, France
Tigers †	Tigrar	Ronnie Sandahl	Sweden, Italy, Denmark
Trouble Will Find Us		Alexander Milo Bischof	United Kingdom

Highlighted title and dagger (†) indicate Flash Forward winner.

=== Wide Angle ===
==== Korean Short Film Competition ====
English title	Original title	Director(s)	Production countrie(s)
Ava from My Class	연극 수업	Kang You-min	South Korea, United States
Georgia †	조지아	Jayil Pak	South Korea
HERO	히로	Jang Jun-young	South Korea
High Surf Expected	울렁울렁 울렁대는 가슴안고	Ahn Jae-hong	South Korea
House of Heeji	희지의 세계	Lee Hyo-jung	South Korea
Peace River	화천	Jang Min-joon	South Korea
Snail	달팽이	Kim Tae-yang	South Korea
The Migration-ship	이주선	Oh Yoo-bin	South Korea
Tree	나무	Cho Hyun-suh	South Korea
Where Does the Wind Come From?	바람 어디서 부는지	Kim Jee-hye	South Korea
Wolves		Lee Seung-wan, Choi Rack-won, Kim Ju-hyeong	South Korea

Highlighted title and dagger (†) indicate Sonje Award winner.

==== Asian Short Film Competition ====
English title	Original title	Director(s)	Production countrie(s)
A Scarecrow		Rajesh Prasad Khatri	Nepal, France, Hong Kong, China
All the Time	هرگز، گاهی، همیشه	Shadi Karamroudi	Iran
Bình		Ostin Fam	Vietnam, South Korea, Singapore, Thailand
How to Die Young in Manila		Petersen Vargas	Philippines
Kanya	கன்யா	Apoorva Satish	India, Czech Republic
Kids on Fire		Kyle Nieva	Philippines
Mountain Cat †	Shiluus	Lkhagvadulam Purev-Ochir	Mongolia, United Kingdom
Sunrise in My Mind	ថ្ងៃរះក្នុងចិត្	Danech San	Cambodia
The Cloud Is Still There	蓝蓝天空	Mickey Lai	Malaysia
Transit		Ariq Anam Khan	Bangladesh, United Kingdom

Highlighted title and dagger (†) indicate Sonje Award winner.

==== Documentary Competition ====
English title	Original title	Director(s)	Production countrie(s)
Children of the Night		Behrouz Nouranipour	Iran
Fear(less) and Dear	誠惶（不）誠恐，親愛的	Anson Hoi Shan Mak	Hong Kong, China
Mishima: The Last Debate	三島由紀夫vs東大全共闘 50年目の真実	Keisuke Toyoshima	Japan
Sasang: The Town on Sand	사상	Park Bae-il	South Korea
School Town King	School Town King แร็ปทะลุฝ้า ราชาไม่หยุดฝัน	Wattanapume Laisuwanchai	Thailand
Self-portrait 2020	셀프-포트레이트 2020	Lee Dong-woo	South Korea
Sewing Sisters	미싱타는 여자들: 전태일의 누이들	Kim Jung-young, Lee Hyuk-rae	South Korea
Sister J †	재춘언니	Lee Soo-jung	South Korea
Song Hae 1927	송해 1927	Jéro Yun	South Korea
The Art of Living in Danger †		Mina Keshavarz	Iran, Germany
The Invisible Shore	无尽的航程	Zhao Qi	China
When a Hen Crows	암탉이 울면	Dabin	South Korea

Highlighted titles and daggers (†) indicate BIFF Mecenat Award winners.

==== Documentary Showcase ====
English title	Original title	Director(s)	Production countrie(s)
A Rifle and a Bag		Cristina Haneș, Isabella Rinaldi, Arya Rothe	India, Romania, Italy, Qatar
Candlelight Revolution	나의 촛불	Kim Eui-sung, Joo Jin-woo	South Korea
City of Outlanders	군산전기	Moon Seung-wook, Yoo Ye-jin	South Korea
Good Light, Good Air	좋은 빛, 좋은 공기	Im Heung-soon	South Korea
Hong Kong Moments		Bing Zhou	China, Germany
Irradiated	Irradiés	Rithy Panh	France, Cambodia
My Body	Il mio corpo	Michele Pennetta	Switzerland, Italy
Notturno		Gianfranco Rosi	Italy, France, Germany
Speed of Happiness	행복의 속도	Park Hyuck-jee	South Korea
The Fight		Eli Despres, Josh Kriegman, Elyse Steinberg	United States
The Mole Agent	El agente topo	Maite Alberdi	Chile, United States, Germany, Netherlands, Spain
The Painter and the Thief	Kunstneren og tyven	Benjamin Ree	Norway
Your Face	니얼굴	Seo Dong-il	South Korea

=== Open Cinema ===
English title	Original title	Director(s)	Production countrie(s)
DAEMUGA	대무가: 한과 흥	Lee Han-jong	South Korea
My Missing Valentine	消失的情人節	Chen Yu-hsun	Taiwan
Soul		Pete Docter, Kemp Powers	United States
Summer of 85	Été 85	François Ozon	France
The Asadas	浅田家!	Ryōta Nakano	Japan
The Ties	Lacci	Daniele Luchetti	Italy

== Awards ==
The following awards were presented at the 25th edition:

- New Currents Award
  - A Balance by Yujiro Harumoto
  - Three by Ruslan Pak
- Kim Jiseok Award
  - Drowning in Holy Water by Navid Mahmoudi
  - The Slaughterhouse by Abbas Amini
- BIFF Mecenat Award
  - The Art of Living in Danger by Mina Keshavarz
  - Sister J by Lee Soo-jung
- Sonje Award
  - Georgia by Jayil Pak
  - Mountain Cat by Lkhagvadulam Purev-Ochir
- Actor & Actress of the Year Award
  - Actor of the Year: Ji Soo for Our Joyful Summer Days
  - Actress of the Year: Lim Seong-mi for Fighter
- Flash Forward Award
  - Tigers by Ronnie Sandahl
- FIPRESCI Award
  - Summer Blur by Han Shuai
- NETPAC Award
  - Fighter by Jéro Yun
- DGK MEGABOX Award
  - Young Adult Matters by Lee Hwan
  - Good Person by Jung Wook
- CGV Arthouse Award
  - Good Person by Jung Wook
- KTH Award
  - Snowball by Lee Woo-jung
  - Young Adult Matters by Lee Hwan
- KBS Independent Film Award
  - Limecrime by Lee Seung-hwan and Yoo Jae-wook
- CGK&SamyangXEEN Award
  - Snowball – Cinematography by Lee Jae-u
