= 70th Berlin International Film Festival =

2020 film festival in Berlin, Germany

- Festival poster
- Opening film: My Salinger Year
- Closing film: There Is No Evil
- Location: Berlin, Germany
- Founded: 1951
- Awards: Golden Bear: There Is No Evil
- Festival date: 20 February – 1 March 2020
- Website: http://www.berlinale.de

Berlin International Film Festival chronology
- 71st 69th

The 70th annual Berlin International Film Festival took place from 20 February to 1 March 2020. It was the first under the leadership of new Berlin Film Festival board: business administration director Mariette Rissenbeek and artistic director Carlo Chatrian.

The festival opening gala was presented by actor Samuel Finzi, followed by the world premiere My Salinger Year, directed by Philippe Falardeau. The Golden Bear was awarded to the Iranian film There Is No Evil, directed by Mohammad Rasoulof.

== Juries ==
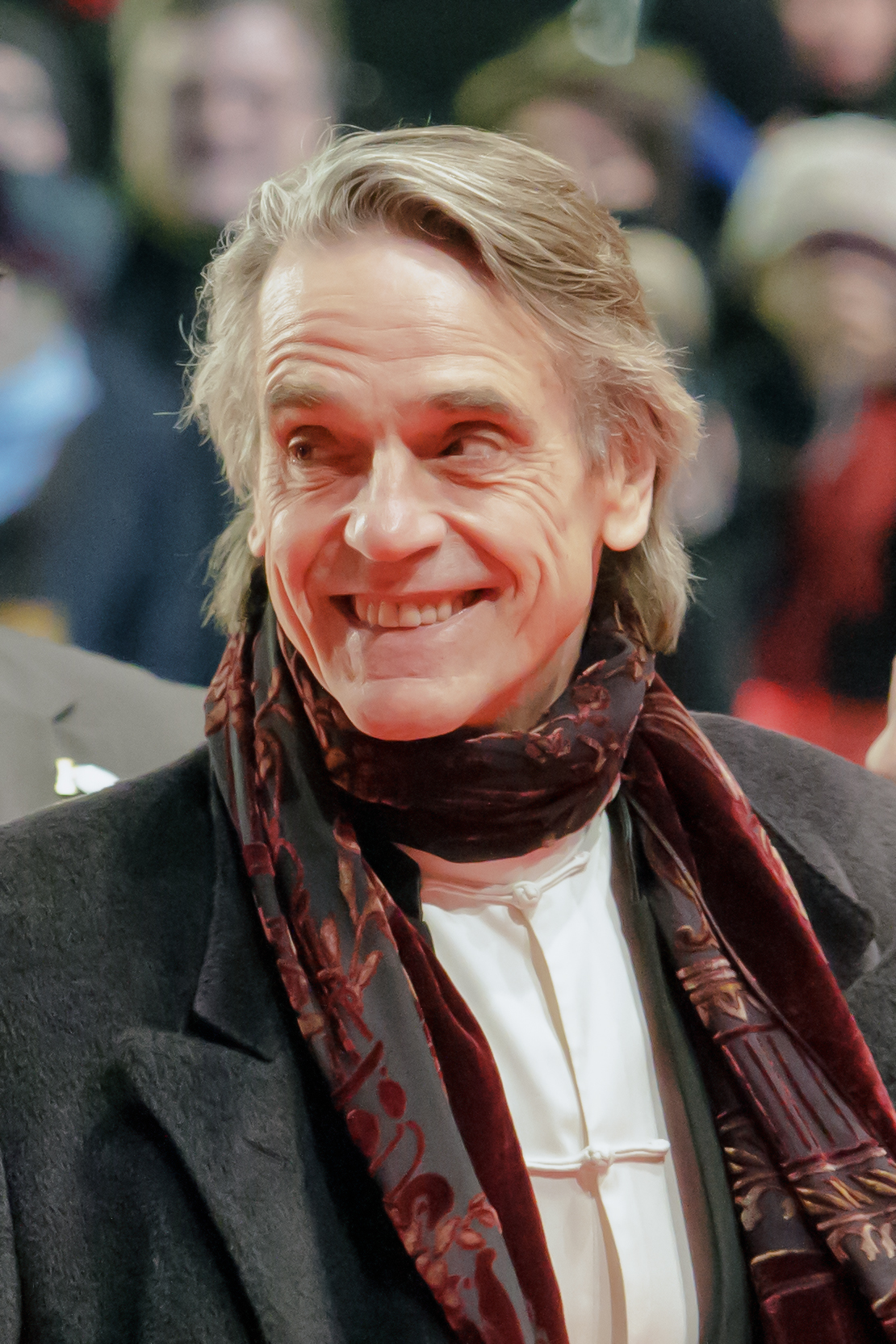
Jeremy Irons, Main Competition Jury President

=== Main competition ===
- Jeremy Irons, British actor - Jury President
- Bérénice Bejo, French actress
- Bettina Brokemper, German producer
- Annemarie Jacir, Palestinian filmmaker and poet
- Kenneth Lonergan, American playwright and filmmaker
- Luca Marinelli, Italian actor
- Kleber Mendonça Filho, Brazilian filmmaker, producer and film critic

=== Encounters ===
- Shōzō Ichiyama, Japanese producer
- Dominga Sotomayor, Chilean filmmaker and producer
- Eva Trobisch, German filmmaker

=== First Feature Award ===
- Ognjen Glavonić, Serbian filmmaker
- Hala Lotfy, Egyptian filmmaker, producer and founder of Hassala Films
- Gonzalo de Pedro Amatria, film scholar

=== Documentary Award ===
- Gerd Kroske, German filmmaker
- Marie Losier, French filmmaker and curator
- Alanis Obomsawin, Canadian filmmaker, singer and artist

=== Short Film Competition ===
- Réka Bucsi, Hungarian filmmaker
- Fatma Çolakoğlu, Turkish curator
- Lemohang Jeremiah Mosese, Sotho filmmaker and artist

== Official Sections ==
=== Main Competition ===
The following films were selected for the main competition for the Golden Bear and Silver Bear awards:

English title	Original title	Director(s)	Production country
All the Dead Ones	Todos os mortos	Caetano Gotardo and Marco Dutra	Brazil, France
Bad Tales	Favolacce	Damiano and Fabio D'Innocenzo	Italy, Switzerland
Berlin Alexanderplatz		Burhan Qurbani	Germany, Netherlands, France
DAU. Natasha		Ilya Khrzhanovskiy and Jekaterina Oertel	Germany, Ukraine, United Kingdom, Russia
Days	日子	Tsai Ming-liang	Taiwan
Delete History	Effacer l'historique	Benoît Delépine and Gustave Kervern	France, Belgium
First Cow		Kelly Reichardt	United States
Hidden Away	Volevo nascondermi	Giorgio Diritti	Italy
The Intruder	El Prófugo	Natalia Meta	Argentina, Mexico
Irradiated	Irradiés	Rithy Panh	France, Cambodia
My Little Sister	Schwesterlein	Stéphanie Chuat and Véronique Reymond	Switzerland
Never Rarely Sometimes Always		Eliza Hittman	United States
The Roads Not Taken		Sally Potter	United Kingdom
The Salt of Tears	Le sel des larmes	Philippe Garrel	France, Switzerland
Siberia		Abel Ferrara	Italy, Germany, Mexico
There Is No Evil	شیطان وجود ندارد	Mohammad Rasoulof	Germany, Czech Republic, Iran
Undine		Christian Petzold	Germany, France
The Woman Who Ran	도망친 여자	Hong Sang-soo	South Korea

=== Out of Competition - Berlinale Special ===
The following films were selected for the Berlinale Special section:

English title	Original title	Director(s)	Production country
The American Sector		Courtney Stephens and Pacho Velez	United States
Charlatan	Šarlatán	Agnieszka Holland	Czech Republic, Ireland, Poland, Slovakia
Curveball		Johannes Naber	Germany
DAU. Degeneration	DAU. Degeneratsia	Ilya Khrzhanovskiy and Ilya Permyakov	Germany, Ukraine, United Kingdom, Russia
Golda Maria		Patrick Sobelman and Hugo Sobelman	France
High Ground		Stephen Maxwell Johnson	Australia
Hillary (series)		Nanette Burstein	United States
Last and First Men		Jóhann Jóhannsson	Iceland
Minamata		Andrew Levitas	United Kingdom
My Salinger Year		Philippe Falardeau	Canada, Ireland
Night Shift	Police	Anne Fontaine	France
Numbers	Nomera	Oleh Sentsov and Akhtem Seitablayev	Ukraine, Poland, Czech Republic, France
The Nutty Professor (1963)		Jerry Lewis	United States
Onward		Dan Scanlon	United States
Paris Calligrammes		Ulrike Ottinger	Germany, France
Persian Lessons	Persischstunden	Vadim Perelman	Russia, Germany, Belarus
Pinocchio		Matteo Garrone	Italy, France, United Kingdom
Speer Goes to Hollywood	שפאר בדרך להוליווד	Vanessa Lapa	Israel
Swimming Out Till the Sea Turns Blue	一直游到海水变蓝	Jia Zhangke	China
Time to Hunt	사냥의 시간	Yoon Sung-hyun	South Korea

=== Encounters ===
The following films were selected for the new Encounters section:

English title	Original title	Director(s)	Production country
Funny Face		Tim Sutton	United States
Gunda		Victor Kossakovsky	Norway, United States
Isabella		Matías Piñeiro	Argentina
Kill It and Leave This Town	Zabij to i wyjedz z tego miasta	Mariusz Wilczyński	Poland
Los Conductos		Camilo Restrepo	Brazil, Colombia, France
The Last City	Die letzte Stadt	Heinz Emigholz	Germany
Malmkrog		Cristi Puiu	Bosnia, North Macedonia, Romania, Serbia, Sweden, Switzerland
The Metamorphosis of Birds	A metamorfose dos pássaros	Catarina Vasconcelos	Portugal
Naked Animals	Nackte Tiere	Melanie Waelde	Germany
Orphea		Khavn and Alexander Kluge	Germany
Servants	Služobníci	Ivan Ostrochovský	Czech Republic, Ireland, Romania, Slovakia
The Shepherdess and the Seven Songs	Laila aur satt geet	Pushpendra Singh	India
Shirley		Josephine Decker	United States
The Trouble with Being Born		Sandra Wollner	Austria, Germany
The Works and Days (of Tayoko Shiojiri in the Shiotani Basin)		Anders Edström and C.W. Winter	Japan, Sweden, United Kingdom, United States

=== Panorama ===
The following films were selected for the Panorama section:

English title	Original title	Director(s)	Production country
All Hands on Deck	À L'abordage	Guillaume Brac	France
Always Amber	Alltid Amber	Lia Hietala and Hannah Reinikainen	Sweden
The Assistant		Kitty Green	United States
Black Milk	Schwarze Milch	Uisenma Borchu	Germany, Mongolia
A Common Crime	Un crimen común	Francisco Márquez	Argentina, Brazil, Switzerland
Digger		Georgis Grigorakis	Greece, France
Dry Wind	Vento Seco	Daniel Nolasco	Brazil
Eeb Allay Ooo!		Prateek Vats	India
Exile	Exil	Visar Morina	Belgium, Germany, Kosovo
Father	Otac	Srdan Golubović	Bosnia and Herzegovina, Croatia, France, Germany, Serbia, Slovenia
Hope	Håp	Maria Sødahl	Norway, Sweden
If It Were Love	Si c'était de l'amour	Patric Chiha	France
Mare		Andrea Štaka	Croatia, Switzerland
Minyan		Eric Steel	United States
Mughal Mowgli		Bassam Tariq	United Kingdom
No Hard Feelings	Futur Drei	Faraz Shariat	Germany
Notes from the Underworld	Aufzeichnungen aus der Unterwelt	Tizza Covi and Rainer Frimmel	Austria
One in a Thousand	Las Mil y Una	Clarisa Navas	Argentina, Germany
One of These Days		Bastian Günther	Germany, United States
Pari		Siamak Etemadi	Bulgaria, France, Greece, Netherlands
Shine Your Eyes	Cidade Pássaro	Matias Mariani	Brazil
Sow the Wind	Semina il vento	Danilo Caputo	France, Greece, Italy
Suk Suk	叔．叔	Ray Yeung	Hong Kong
Surge		Aneil Karia	United Kingdom
Wildland	Kød & Blod	Jeanette Nordahl	Denmark
Panorama Dokumente
Amazon Mirror	O reflexo do lago	Fernando Segtowick	Brazil
Bloody Nose, Empty Pockets		Bill and Turner Ross	United States
Days of Cannibalism		Teboho Edkins	France, Netherlands, South Africa
The Foundation Pit	Kotlovan (Котлован)	Andrey Gryazev	Russia
I Dream of Singapore		Lei Yuan Bin	Singapore, Malaysia, United Kingdom
If It Were Love	Si c'était de l'amour	Patric Chiha	France
Little Girl	Petite fille	Sébastien Lifshitz	France, Belgium
Nardjes A.		Karim Aïnouz	Algeria, Brazil, France, Germany, Qatar
Running on Empty	Jetzt oder morgen	Lisa Weber	Austria
Schlingensief – A Voice That Shook the Silence	Schlingensief – In das Schweigen hineinschreien	Bettina Böhler	Germany
Welcome to Chechnya		David France	United States

=== Berlinale Shorts ===
The following films were selected for the Berlinale shorts section:

English title	Original title	Director(s)	Production country
2008		Blake Williams	Canada
À l'entrée de la nuit		Anton Bialas	France
Aletsch Negative		Laurence Bonvin	Switzerland
Atkūrimas		Laurynas Bareisa	Lithuania
Cause of Death		Jyoti Mistry	South Africa/Austria
A Demonstration		Sasha Litvintseva, Beny Wagner	Germany, Netherlands, United Kingdom
Filipiñana		Rafael Manuel	Philippines, United Kingdom
Foam	Écume	Omar Elhamy	Canada
Genius Loci		Adrien Mérigeau	France
Girl and Body		Charlotte Mars	Australia
Gumnaam Din		Ekta Mittal	India
HaMa'azin		Omer Sterenberg	Israel
How to Disappear		Robin Klengel, Leonhard Müllner, Michael Stumpf	Austria
Huntsville Station		Jamie Meltzer, Chris Filippone	United States
Inflorescence		Nicolaas Schmidt	Germany
It Wasn't the Right Mountain, Mohammad		Mili Pecherer	France
My Galactic Twin Galaction	Мой галактический двойник Галактион	Sasha Svirsky	Russia
Playback	Ensayo de una despedida	Agustina Comedi	Argentina
She Who Wears the Rain	Celle qui porte la pluie	Marianne Métivier	Canada
So We Live		Rand Abou Fakher	Belgium
Stump the Guesser		Guy Maddin, Evan Johnson, Galen Johnson	Canada
T		Keisha Rae Witherspoon	United States
Union County		Adam Meeks	United States
Veitstanz/Feixtanz (1988)		Gabriele Stötzer	East Germany

== Other sections ==
The Berlinale retrospective included more than 30 films by Hollywood filmmaker King Vidor. The homage was dedicated to Helen Mirren, with Mirren awarded with the Honorary Golden Bear. The Berlinale Camera was awarded to Ulrike Ottinger followed by the world premiere of Ottinger's documentary Paris Calligrammes.

The Series section, introduced in 2015, is devoted to longform television series. In 2020, there were two Australian entries: Stateless and Mystery Road Series 2.

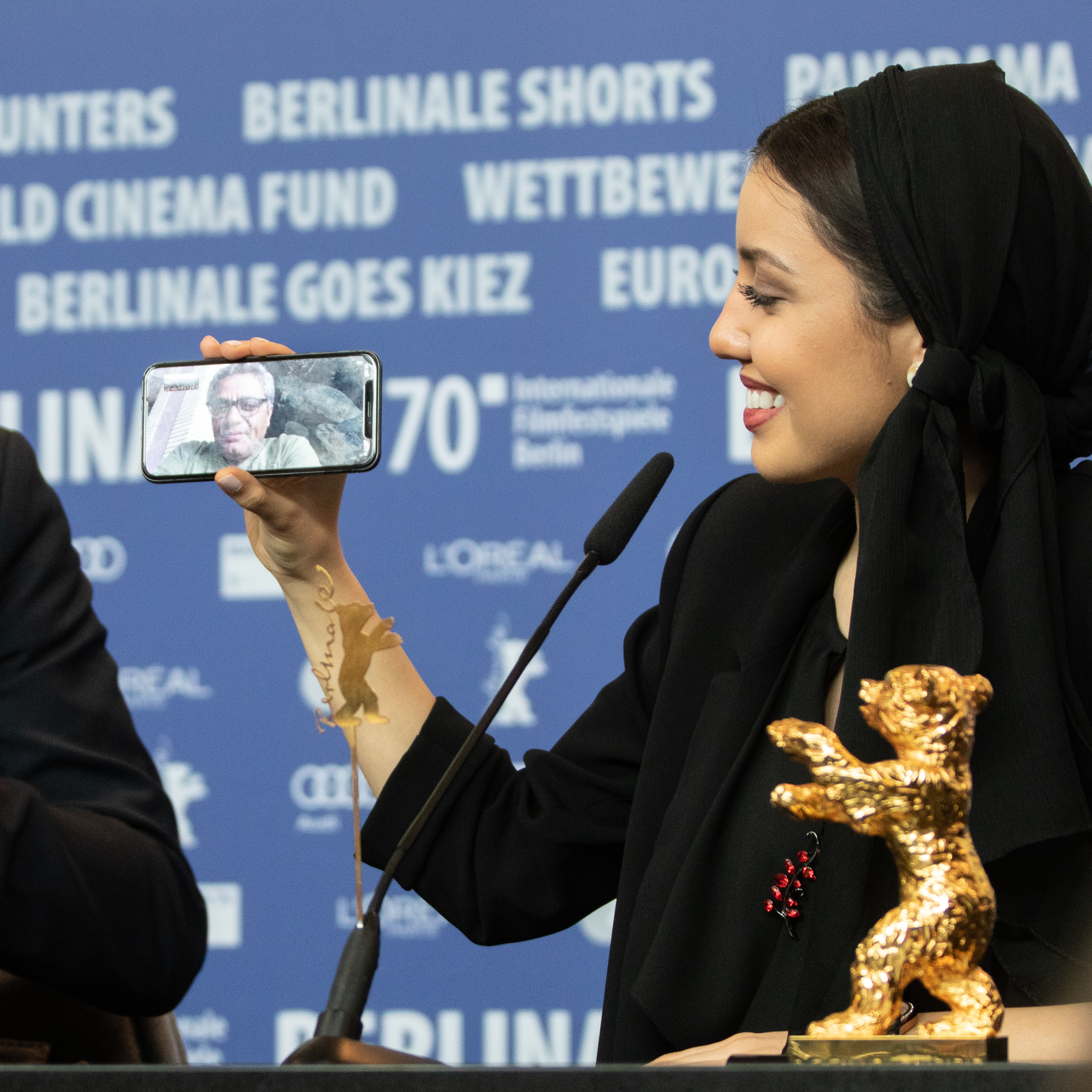
Mohammad Rasoulof, video chatted at the award winners' press conference of the Berlinale

== Official Awards ==
The following prizes were awarded:

=== Main Competition ===
- Golden Bear: There Is No Evil by Mohammad Rasoulof
- Silver Bear Grand Jury Prize: Never Rarely Sometimes Always by Eliza Hittman
- Silver Bear for Best Director: Hong Sang-soo for The Woman Who Ran
- Silver Bear for Best Actress: Paula Beer for Undine
- Silver Bear for Best Actor: Elio Germano for Hidden Away
- Silver Bear for Best Screenplay: Damiano and Fabio D'Innocenzo for Bad Tales
- Silver Bear for Outstanding Artistic Contribution: Jürgen Jürges for DAU. Natasha (cinematography)
- Silver Bear 70th Berlinale: Delete History by Benoît Delépine and Gustave Kervern

=== Short Film Competition ===
- Golden Bear for Best Short Film: Keisha Rae Witherspoon for T

=== Best First Feature ===
- Camilo Restrepo for Los conductos

=== Encounters ===
- Best Film: The Works and Days (of Tayoko Shiojiri in the Shiotani Basin) by C.W. Winter & Anders Edström
- Best Director: Cristi Puiu for Malmkrog
- Special Jury Award: The Trouble with Being Born by Sandra Wollner
  - Special Mention: Isabella by Matías Piñeiro

=== Panorama ===
- Audience Award:
  - 1st Place: Father by Srdan Golubović
  - 2nd Place: No Hard Feelings by Faraz Shariat
  - 3rd Place: Hope by Maria Sødahl
- Audience Award – Documentaries:
  - 1st Place: Welcome to Chechnya by David France
  - 2nd Place: Saudi Runaway by Susanne Regina Meures
  - 3rd Place: Little Girl by Sébastien Lifshitz

=== Generation ===
==== Generation 14Plus ====
- Crystal Bear for the Best Film: Our Lady of the Nile by Atiq Rahimi
  - Special Mention: White Riot by Rubika Shah
- Crystal Bear for the Best Short Film: Mutts by Halima Ouardiri
  - Special Mention: Goodbye Golovin by Mathieu Grimard
- Grand Prix of the Generation 14Plus International Jury for the Best Film: My Name Is Baghdad by Caru Alves de Souza
  - Special Mention: Voices in the Wind by Nobuhiro Suwa
- Special Prize of the Generation 14plus International Jury for the Best Short Film: Mutts by Halima Ouardiri
  - Special Mention: White Winged Horse by Mahyar Mandegar

==== Generation KPlus ====
- Crystal Bear for Best Film: Sweet Thing by Alexandre Rockwell
  - Special Mention: H Is for Happiness by John Sheedy
- Crystal Bear for the Best Short Film: The Name of the Son by Martina Matzkin
  - Special Mention: Miss by Amira Géhanne Khalfallah
- The Grand Prix of the International Jury in Generation Kplus for the Best Film: The Wolves by Samuel Kishi Leopo
  - Special Mention:
    - Cuties by Maïmouna Doucouré
    - Mum, Mum, Mum by Sol Berruezo Pichon-Rivière
- Special Prize of the International Jury in Generation Kplus for the Best Short Film: The Name of the Son by Martina Matzkin
  - Special Mention: The Kites by Seyed Payam Hosseini

== Independent Awards ==
=== Teddy Award ===
- Best Feature Film: No Hard Feelings by Faraz Shariat
- Best Documentary/Essay Film: If It Were Love by Patric Chiha
- Best Short Film: Playback by Agustina Comedi
- Special Jury Award: Days by Tsai Ming-liang

=== FIPRESCI Prize ===
- Competition: Undine by Christian Petzold
- Panorama: Mogul Mowgli by Bassam Tariq
  - Special Mention: All Hands on Deck by Guillaume Brac
- Forum: The Twentieth Century by Matthew Rankin
  - Special Mention: Overtures by The Living and the Dead Ensemble
- Encounters: The Metamorphosis of Birds by Catarina Vasconcelos

=== Prize of the Ecumenical Jury ===
- Competition: There Is No Evil by Mohammad Rasoulof
- Panorama: Father by Srdan Golubović
  - Special Mention: Saudi Runaway by Susanne Regina Meures

=== Caligari Film Prize ===
- Victoria by Sofie Benoot, Liesbeth De Ceulaer and Isabelle Tollenaere

=== Heiner Carow Prize ===
- Garagenvolk by Natalija Yefimkina

=== Compass-Perspektive-Award ===
- Walchensee Forever by Janna Ji Wonders

=== Kompagnon-Fellowship ===
- Perspektive Deutsches Kino: 111 by Hristiana Rykova
- Berlinale Talents: Arctic Link by Ian Purnell
