= Édouard Sulpice =

French actor

- Born: 1995 (age 30–31); Chambéry, France
- Occupation: actor
- Years active: 2020–present

Édouard Sulpice is a French actor born in Chambéry in 1995. He studied at the CNSAD and began his film career by playing the role of Édouard in the film À l'abordage by Guillaume Brac.

== Career ==
Édouard studied at the National Higher Conservatory of Dramatic Art, where he graduated in 2020. In 2020, he obtained his first film role, playing the character of Édouard in the film À l'abordage directed by Guillaume Brac. The same year, he played the role of young Rabut (played by Jean-Pierre Darroussin) at the age of 20, in the film Des hommes, directed by Lucas Belvaux based on the novel of the same name by Laurent Mauvignier. In 2021, he played the role of Patrick in L'Évènement directed by Audrey Diwan. In 2022, he played the role of Anthony in the play Their children after them by Nicolas Mathieu. He is in the UBBA agency, located in Paris.

== Filmography ==
- 2020: À l'abordage of Guillaume Brac: Édouard
- 2020: Home Front of Lucas Belvaux: Rabut à 20 ans
- 2021: L'Évènement of Audrey Diwan: Patrick
- 2021: Annie Colère of Blandine Lenoir: The intern in slip
- 2022: Youssef Salem a du succès de Baya Kasmi: Édouard
- 2022: Les Goûts et les Couleurs of Michel Leclerc: the first pubard
- 2023: Mon crime of François Ozon: André Bonnard
- 2023: Le Théorème de Marguerite of Anna Novion: a student
- 2024: The Quiet Son
