= The Beast in the Jungle (film) =

2023 film by Patric Chiha

- Theatrical release poster
- French: La Bête dans la jungle
- Directed by: Patric Chiha
- Screenplay by: Patric Chiha; Axelle Ropert; Jihane Chouaib
- Based on: The Beast in the Jungle by Henry James
- Produced by: Charlotte Vincent; Katia Khazak; Ebba Sinzinger; Vincent Lucassen
- Starring: Anaïs Demoustier; Tom Mercier; Béatrice Dalle
- Cinematography: Céline Bozon
- Edited by: Karina Ressler; Julien Lacheray
- Music by: Yelli Yelli; Dino Spiluttini; Florent Charissoux
- Production companies: Aurora Films; Frakas Productions; Wildart Film
- Distributed by: Les Films du Losange (France); O'Brother (Belgium)
- Release dates: 17 February 2023 (Berlin Film Festival); 16 August 2023 (France)
- Running time: 103 min
- Countries: France; Belgium; Austria
- Language: French
- Budget: €3 million
- Box office: $54,756

The Beast in the Jungle (French: La Bête dans la jungle) is a 2023 drama film directed by Patric Chiha, from a screenplay by Chiha, Axelle Ropert and Jihane Chouaib, freely adapted from the 1903 novella of the same name by Henry James, and starring Anaïs Demoustier, Tom Mercier and Béatrice Dalle. The film is a co-production between France, Belgium and Austria. It made its world premiere in competition in the Panorama section of the 73rd Berlin Film Festival on 17 February 2023, and was released theatrically in France by Les Films du Losange on 16 August 2023.

== Plot ==
For 25 years, from 1979 to 2004, a man and a woman wait together for a mysterious event in a big nightclub.

== Cast ==
- Anaïs Demoustier as May
- Tom Mercier as John
- Béatrice Dalle as The Physiognomist
- Martin Vischer as Pierre
- Sophie Demeyer as Alice
- Pedro Cabanas as Mr. Pipi
- Mara Taquin as Céline
- Bachir Tlili as Yacine

== Production ==
=== Development ===
In July 2017, it was announced that director Patric Chiha was writing the screenplay for his next film, The Beast in the Jungle, freely adapted from the 1903 novella of the same name by American-British author Henry James. On 15 April 2019, British magazine Screen Daily reported that French actor Gaspard Ulliel had signed on to play the protagonist of the film alongside Luxembourg actress Vicky Krieps as the female lead. The film was originally scheduled to start shooting in Winter 2019 for a 2020 release. Chiha described this film as a "love story" and a "tale of an obsession".

On 24 November 2021, Cineuropa reported that French actress Anaïs Demoustier, Israeli actor Tom Mercier and French actress Béatrice Dalle had been cast for the main roles and that filming would begin on 29 November 2021 in Brussels.

The Beast in the Jungle reunites director Patric Chiha with producer Charlotte Vincent of Paris-based company Aurora Films, who produced his two previous feature films, Domain (2009), and Boys Like Us (2014). Les Films du Losange handled the international pre-sales for the film at the 2019 Cannes Film Festival, and also took the French distribution rights. The film is a co-production between France's Aurora Films, along with Belgium's Frakas Productions and Austria's WILDart Film. The production is 42.49% French, 39.27% Belgian, and 18.24% Austrian, and it had the support of the CNC, the Wallonia-Brussels Federation, Österreichisches Filminstitut, BeTV, Proximus, RTBF, Screen Brussels, Cinémage, Arte/Cofinova, development aid from the CNC, MEDIA and Procirep.

=== Filming ===
Filming took place in Vienna, Austria, and in Brussels, Bruxelles-Ville, and Saint-Josse-ten-Noode in Belgium between 11 November 2021 and 14 January 2022. The club Mirano in Brussels served as the set for the nightclub featured in the film.

== Release ==
The film made its world premiere in the Panorama section of the 73rd Berlin Film Festival on 17 February 2023. It was released theatrically in France on 16 August 2023 by Les Films du Losange, and in Belgium by O'Brother.

== Awards and nominations ==
Year	Award / Festival	Category	Recipient(s)	Result	Ref.
2023	73rd Berlin Film Festival	Panorama Audience Award for Best Feature Film	Patric Chiha	Nominated	
2023	73rd Berlin Film Festival	Teddy Award - Best LGBT Feature Film	Patric Chiha	Nominated	
2023	Diagonale Festival of Austrian Film	Best Costume Design	Claire Dubien	Won	
2023	Prix Louis-Delluc	Best Film	Patric Chiha	Nominated	
2024	Magritte Awards	Most Promising Actress	Mara Taquin	Nominated	

== See also ==
- The Beast (2023), another film based on the Henry James novella
