= Digger (2020 film) =

2020 film

- Official film poster
- Directed by: Georgis Grigorakis
- Written by: Georgis Grigorakis
- Produced by: Athina Rachel Tsangari; Maria Hatzakou; Chrysanthi Karfi Koi
- Starring: Vangelis Mourikis; Argyris Pandazaras; Sofia Kokkali
- Cinematography: Giorgos Karvelas
- Edited by: Thodoris Armaos
- Music by: Michalis Moschoutis
- Production company: Haos Film
- Distributed by: The Match Factory
- Release date: 24 February 2020 (Berlin)
- Running time: 101 minutes
- Country: Greece
- Language: Greek

Digger is a 2020 Greek drama film directed by Greek director and screenwriter Georgis Grigorakis. It had its world premiere screening as part of the Panorama section at the 70th Berlin International Film Festival, where it won the independent jury International Confederation of Art Cinemas Art Cinema Award for Panorama 2020.

The film has been shown and nominated in international festivals around the world, winning 19 awards. It was nominated for 14 awards at the Hellenic Film Academy Awards and won ten awards, including Best Feature Film, Best Director, and Best Cinematography. It was selected as the Greek entry for the Best International Feature Film at the 94th Academy Awards.

== Plot ==
Nikitas is a father who lives in rural northern Greece, where a mining company threatens the natural landscape and disturbs his daily life. His son, Johnny, visits unexpectedly after a 20-year absence, bringing a whole other tension to Nikitas' life, when he discovers his wife has died. His son now demands his half of his inheritance, causing tension.

== Cast ==
- Vangelis Mourikis as Nikitas
- Argyris Pandazaras as Johnny
- Sofia Kokkali as Mary

== Awards ==
Year	Award	Category	Recipient(s) and nominee(s)	Result	Ref.
2020	AFI Fest	Best Film	Digger	Nominated	
2020	70th Berlin Film Festival	CICAE - Art Cinema Award / Panorama	Digger	Won	
2020	70th Berlin Film Festival	FIPRESCI Prize / Panorama	Digger	Nominated	
2020	Angers European First Film Festival	Best Feature Film (European Jury Award)	Digger	Nominated	
2020	Busan International Film Festival	World Cinema	Digger	Nominated	
2020	Edmonton International Film Festival	Best International Dramatic Feature	Digger	Nominated	
2020	Free Zone Film Festival	Balkan Horizons / Best Film Award	Digger	Won	
2020	Göteborg Film Festival	Best International Feature (Dramatic)	Digger	Nominated	
2020	Haifa International Film Festival	Best International Film / Carmel Award	Digger	Nominated	
2020	Hainan International Film Festival	Best Feature Film / Golden Coconut	Digger	Nominated	
2020	Melbourne International Film Festival	Best Film / Grand Prix	Digger	Nominated	
2020	Molodist International Film Festival	Best Feature Film / Scythian Deer	Digger	Nominated	
2020	Philadelphia Film Festival	Best First Feature / Archie Award	Digger	Nominated	
2020	San Francisco Greek Film Festival	Best Film Award	Digger	Nominated	
2020	Sarajevo Film Festival	Best Actor	Vangelis Mourikis	Won	
2020	Sarajevo Film Festival	Best Film / Heart of Sarajevo	Digger	Nominated	
2020	São Paulo International Film Festival	Best Fiction	Digger	Nominated	
2020	Thessaloniki International Film Festival	International Competition (Audience Award)	Digger	Won	
2020	Thessaloniki International Film Festival	Best Debut Film (Greek Film Centre Award)	Digger	Won	
2020	Thessaloniki International Film Festival	Greek Films (J.F.Costopoulos Foundation Award)	Digger	Won	
2020	Thessaloniki International Film Festival	Special Jury Award (Silver Alexander)	Digger	Won	
2020	Thessaloniki International Film Festival	Best Feature Film Award (Youth Jury Award)	Digger	Won	
2020	Thessaloniki International Film Festival	International Competition (Golden Alexander)	Digger	Nominated	
2021	Hellenic Film Academy Awards	Best Film Director	Georgis Grigorakis	Won	
2021	Hellenic Film Academy Awards	Best Newcomer	Georgis Grigorakis	Won	
2021	Hellenic Film Academy Awards	Best Screenplay	Georgis Grigorakis	Won	
2021	Hellenic Film Academy Awards	Best Actor	Vangelis Mourikis	Won	
2021	Hellenic Film Academy Awards	Best Supporting Actor	Argyris Pandazaras	Nominated	
2021	Hellenic Film Academy Awards	Best Supporting Actress	Sofia Kokkali	Nominated	
2021	Hellenic Film Academy Awards	Best Cinematography	Giorgos Karvelas	Won	
2021	Hellenic Film Academy Awards	Best Film Editing	Thodoris Armaos	Nominated	
2021	Hellenic Film Academy Awards	Best Production Design	Dafni Kalogianni	Won	
2021	Hellenic Film Academy Awards	Best Costume Design	Vassilia Rozana	Nominated	
2021	Hellenic Film Academy Awards	Best Make-up	Ioanna Lygizou	Won	
2021	Hellenic Film Academy Awards	Best Special Effects	Matthaios Voulgaris, Dafni Kalogianni, Arnaud Chelet	Won	
2021	Hellenic Film Academy Awards	Best Feature Film	HAOS Film	Won	
2021	Hellenic Film Academy Awards	Best Sound	Leandros Ntounis, François Abdelnour, Simon Apostolou	Won	
2021	Los Angeles Greek Film Festival	Best Feature Film	Digger	Nominated	

== See also ==
- List of submissions to the 94th Academy Awards for Best International Feature Film
- List of Greek submissions for the Academy Award for Best International Feature Film
