= Béatrice Dalle =

French actress

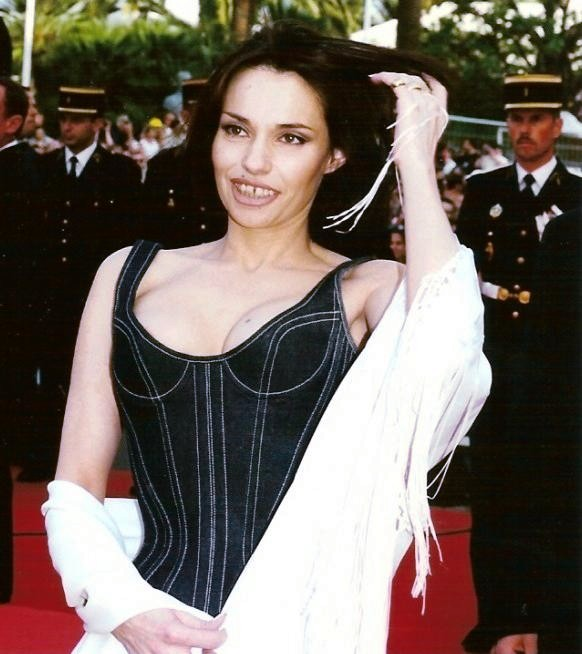
- Dalle in 1999
- Born: Béatrice Cabarrou; 19 December 1964 (age 61); Brest, Brittany, France
- Occupation: Actress
- Years active: 1986–present
- Spouses: Jean-François Dalle (m. 1985; div. 1988) Guénaël Meziani (m. 2005; div. 2014)
- Partner: JoeyStarr (1994–2005)

Béatrice Dalle (born 19 December 1964) is a French actress and model. She has appeared in over fifty films and is best known internationally for her debut role in the 1986 film 37°2 le matin (also released as Betty Blue). Béatrice Dalle is renowned for her intense and unconventional roles, often portraying characters that are both provocative and transgressive.

== Biography ==
Dalle was born in Brest, Finistère, France, as Béatrice Cabarrou. She was raised Catholic and grew up in Le Mans with her mother, father, and an older sister. At age 15, Dalle ran away from home to live in Paris.

== Career ==
Dalle was working as a model when she met filmmaker Jean-Jacques Beineix. Beineix cast her in the lead role of the 1986 film 37°2 le matin (released in the UK and the USA as Betty Blue), which received BAFTA and Oscar nominations for Best Foreign Language Film and made Dalle a star.

She went on to appear in a series of major roles in French films, including the 1989 film Chimère, which was entered into the 1989 Cannes Film Festival.

She featured in the 1987 music video for Buster Poindexter's version of "Oh Me Oh My (I'm fool for you Baby)" and in the 1991 music video for "Move to Memphis" by Norwegian band a-ha.

In 1988, Dalle was interviewed by Clive James in "Postcard from Paris", where she said she was tired of Paris and wanted to move to New York.

She starred in Jim Jarmusch's Night on Earth in 1991.

In 1997, she was cast in The Blackout, her first film made in the United States.

In 2001, Dalle appeared in the controversial film Trouble Every Day, in which she played a compulsive sexual cannibal. She starred in the 2007 film À l'intérieur, in which she played a cruel psychopath stalking a pregnant woman.

== Controversies ==
Dalle has been arrested on several occasions for shoplifting, drug possession and assault. She has had run-ins with the law in France and was arrested for alleged drug possession in America. An investigation into a suspected drug trafficking network led to Dalle being questioned in Paris as a witness in 2005.

Interviewed on the French TV programme Divan in 2016, Dalle stated that when she used to work in a morgue with her friends, they sold body parts of corpses, and while on acid, they ate a dead man's ear.

== Personal life ==
In 1985, she married the painter Jean-François Dalle, whom she divorced in 1988. She kept his patronym.

After her divorce, she had a brief relationship with lawyer Arno Klarsfeld.

In 1994, Dalle met JoeyStarr, a rapper from the French group NTM, and they began a romantic relationship. They remained together for ten tumultuous years. JoeyStarr later said that they had to separate and keep some distance between them because they were a fusional couple. Dalle and JoeyStarr separated in 2005. They remained inseparable afterwards.

In January 2005, while making a film about prison life in Brest, Dalle met Guenaël Meziani, serving a 12-year prison sentence for assaulting and raping his ex-girlfriend. She married him after 24 one-hour visits and spoke on his behalf at hearings for his early release. According to a 2015 profile of Dalle, she said the marriage was "a complete disaster" once Meziani was released from prison. Their divorce was finalised in July 2014.

After her second divorce, Dalle was in a relationship with a man named Eddy, a mixed martial arts (MMA) instructor. She then began a relationship with Paul Bichet-Galaup, 32 years her junior. In February 2026, Dalle said that she and JoeyStarr had not talked for two years.

In a 2018 interview Dalle stated she was a practicing Catholic.

== Filmography ==
Year	Title	Role	Director	Notes
1986	Betty Blue	Betty	Jean-Jacques Beineix	Nominated - César Award for Best Actress
1986	On a volé Charlie Spencer !	The Star	Francis Huster	
1988	The Witches' Sabbath	Maddalena	Marco Bellocchio	
1989	Chimère	Alice	Claire Devers	
1989	Les bois noirs	Violette	Jacques Deray	
1990	A Woman's Revenge	Suzy	Jacques Doillon	
1991	Night on Earth	Blind Woman	Jim Jarmusch	
1992	La Belle Histoire	Odona	Claude Lelouch	
1992	La Fille de l'air	Brigitte	Maroun Bagdadi	
1994	I Can't Sleep	Mona	Claire Denis	
1994	À la folie	Elsa	Diane Kurys	
1996	Désiré	Madeleine	Bernard Murat	
1996	Clubbed to Death	Saida	Yolande Zauberman	
1997	The Blackout	Annie	Abel Ferrara	
1997	Al límite	Elena	Eduardo Campoy	
1999	Toni	Marie	Philomène Esposito	
2000	La vérité vraie	Cathy	Fabrice Cazeneuve	TV movie
2001	Trouble Every Day	Coré	Claire Denis	
2001	H Story	The Actress	Nobuhiro Suwa	
2002	Seventeen Times Cecile Cassard	Cécile Cassard	Christophe Honoré	
2002	Tamala 2010: A Punk Cat in Space	Tatla	Tol	
2002	Les oreilles sur le dos	Monica	Xavier Durringer	TV movie
2003	Time of the Wolf	Lise Brandt	Michael Haneke	
2003	Vendetta	Alice	Richard Aujard	Short
2004	Clean	Elena	Olivier Assayas	
2004	The Gate of Sun	Catherine	Yousry Nasrallah	
2004	The Intruder	Queen of the north	Claire Denis	
2004	Process	The Actress	C.S. Leigh	
2005	Dans tes rêves	Ava	Denis Thybaud	
2006	Tête d'or	The Princess	Gilles Blanchard	
2007	Truands	Béatrice	Frédéric Schoendoerffer	
2007	Inside	The Woman	Julien Maury and Alexandre Bustillo	Fangoria Chainsaw Award for Best Supporting Actress; Fright Meter Award for Best Supporting Actress
2008	Les bureaux de Dieu	Milena	Claire Simon	
2008	New Wave	Anna	Gaël Morel	TV movie
2009	Domain	Nadia	Patric Chiha	
2011	Jimmy Rivière	Gina	Teddy Lussi-Modeste	
2011	De l'encre	Mathilde	Ekoué & Hamé	TV movie
2011	Notre Paradis	Anna	Gaël Morel	
2011	Livid	Lucie's mother	Julien Maury and Alexandre Bustillo	
2012	Bye Bye Blondie	Gloria	Virginie Despentes	
2012	L'étoile du jour	Zohra	Sophie Blondy	
2013	Punk	Teresa	Jean-Stéphane Sauvaire	TV movie
2013	Le renard jaune	Béatrice	Jean-Pierre Mocky	
2013	My Sisters	Mildred	Lars Kraume	
2013	You and the Night	The Commissioner	Yann Gonzalez	
2013	Myster Mocky présente	Henriette	Jean-Pierre Mocky	TV series (1 Episode)
2014	Among the Living	Jeanne Faucheur	Julien Maury and Alexandre Bustillo	
2014	ABCs of Death 2	The Grandmother	Julien Maury	
2014	Rosenn		Yvan Le Moine	
2015	Malaterra	Suzanne Leroy	Jean-Xavier de Lestrade & Laurent Herbiet	TV Mini-Series
2017	Chacun sa vie et son intime conviction		Claude Lelouch	
2018	The Happy Prince	Café Manager	Rupert Everett	
2019	Lux Æterna	Béatrice Dalle	Gaspar Noé	
2023	The Beast in the Jungle	The Physiognomist	Patric Chiha	
2023	Le bonheur est pour demain	Lucie	Brigitte Sy	
2024	The Passion According to Béatrice		Fabrice Du Welz	Docufiction
2024	Maldoror		Fabrice Du Welz	

== Theatre ==
Year	Title	Author	Director
2014	Lucrèce Borgia	Victor Hugo	David Bobée
2019	Elephant Man	Bernard Pomerance	David Bobée

== Music videos ==
Year	Title	Role	Artist	Ref(s)
1990s	"Move to Memphis"	The young woman	A-ha	
2019	"Kimono dans l'ambulance"	One of the characters	Indochine	
2021	"Cold & Distant"	Protagonist	Hangman's Chair	
