= All Hands on Deck =

All Hands on Deck is a boatswain's call for a ship's whole crew to assemble on deck.

All Hands on Deck may also refer to:

- All Hands on Deck (1961 film), a 1961 musical film, or the title song by Pat Boone
- All Hands on Deck (2020 film), a 2020 French film
- All Hands on Deck (play), a 2019 play about the Wrens
- "All Hands on Deck" (song), a 2014 song by Tinashe

== See also ==
- All Hands on Duck
