= EIFF =

EIFF may refer to:

- Edinburgh International Film Festival
- Edmonton International Film Festival
