= Tonnerre (film) =

2013 French drama film

- Film poster
- Directed by: Guillaume Brac
- Written by: Guillaume Brac; Hélène Ruault
- Produced by: Alice Girard
- Starring: Vincent Macaigne; Solène Rigot; Bernard Ménez
- Cinematography: Tom Harari
- Edited by: Damien Maestraggi
- Music by: Rover
- Production company: Rectangle Productions
- Distributed by: Wild Bunch
- Release dates: 12 August 2013 (Locarno); 29 January 2014 (France)
- Running time: 102 minutes
- Country: France
- Language: French

Tonnerre is a 2013 French drama film directed by Guillaume Brac. It stars Vincent Macaigne, Solène Rigot, and Bernard Ménez. Set in Tonnerre, Yonne, it tells the story of a rock musician who moves back in with his father and falls in love with a young girl. The film had its world premiere at the Locarno Festival on 12 August 2013. It was released in France on 29 January 2014.

== Plot ==
A rock musician Maxime moves back from Paris to his hometown of Tonnerre, Yonne. He now lives together with his father and a dog. He is interviewed by a young journalist Mélodie, who wants to write a story about him. The two become a couple, spending a good time together for a while. However, Mélodie suddenly dumps Maxime and makes up with her ex-boyfriend Ivan. Maxime steals a gun and kidnaps her.

== Cast and characters ==
- Vincent Macaigne as Maxime
- Solène Rigot as Mélodie
- Bernard Ménez as Father
- Jonas Bloquet as Ivan

== Release ==
The film had its world premiere at the Locarno Festival on 12 August 2013. It was released in France on 29 January 2014.

== Reception ==
On review aggregator website Rotten Tomatoes, the film holds an approval rating of 83% based on 6 reviews, with an average rating of 7.25/10.

Jordan Mintzer of The Hollywood Reporter wrote, "Tonnerre is at once emotionally succinct and cinematically nonchalant, combining scripted drama with what seem like off-the-cuff scenes where local townfolk serve as bit players." He called the film "an involving character study, with characters that resonate like real people." Ronnie Scheib of Variety commented that Guillaume Brac "shifts tones radically, veering sharply from awkward romantic comedy into psychological-thriller territory, naturalizing his hero's obsessive behavior and downward spiral while leaving room for unexpected side trips."

The film won the Special Mention from the FICC/IFFS Jury at the Locarno Festival. Vincent Macaigne won the Best Actor award at the Mumbai Film Festival.
