= Punto de Vista International Documentary Film Festival =

Coordinates: 42°49′N 1°39′W

Punto de Vista International Documentary Film Festival of Navarra (Spanish: Festival Internacional de Cine Documental de Navarra Punto de Vista) or simply Punto de Vista Festival (Spanish: Festival Punto de Vista) is a film festival created in 2005 and held annually in the city of Pamplona.

It emerged as the heir of the old Certamen de Creación Audiovisual de Navarra. It is promoted by the Department of Culture of the Government of Navarra and organized by NICDO. It takes place every year in March and its main venue is Baluarte, Palacio de Congresos y Auditorio de Navarra.

== History ==
=== Certamen de Creación Audiovisual de Navarra ===
Punto de Vista has an antecedent in the Navarra Audiovisual Creation Festival, a festival celebrating audiovisual creations held from 1993 to 2002. Videos, computer animation, and auteur documentary films had a prominent place in this festival; there even was a competition for them. In 1998, CD-ROM and Internet creations were added to the competition, in an attempt to include the new artistic languages that emerged from the use of new technologies.

The Navarra Audiovisual Creation Festival welcomed artists working in the new media as well as programmers and scholars who reflected about the changes in the industry. In 1996 and 1998, two series of meetings were held -Video Meetings in Pamplona and Video/AlterMedia Meetings in Pamplona-, gathering specialists like Eugeni Bonet, Lourdes Cilleruelo, Marcelo Expósito, Gabriel Villota, Carles Ameller, Laura Baigorri, and María Pallier, among others.

Directed by Ana Herrera, the Festival was under the artistic guidance of Rafael Baliña in its first four editions.

In 2002, the Festival was redesigned and the Punto de Vista project was conceived. The last editions of the Navarra Audiovisual Creation Festival included retrospectives that paved the way for the new Festival to explore the territory where the documentary and the experimental converge. Carlos Muguiro was the curator of the retrospectives dedicated to José Val del Omar (1997) and Alexander Sokurov (1999). In 2000, the Festival focused on Chris Marker, with a retrospective curated by Mercedes Alvarez. Finally, in 2002, the festival introduced in Spain, thanks to Efrén Cuevas, a retrospective dedicated to Alan Berliner.

The year 2005 marked the beginning of a new stage: the Punto de Vista Documentary Film Festival was created. Just like its predecessor, Punto de Vista was sponsored by the Directorate-General for Culture of the Government of Navarra. In the period 2010-2014 was organized by the public foundation INAAC

After the Punto de Vista festival had been held uninterruptedly for seven editions, from 2005 until 2011, it was agreed to make Punto de Vista biennial in subsequent editions. Therefore, the festival would be held every two years. In order not to disappear from the map for 24 consecutive months, the management body of the festival decided to develop seminars every other year (2012 and 2014). In 2015, Punto de Vista will be yearly again in an edition organized by the Government of Navarra until 2018, when it began to be fully organized by NICDO.

=== Jean Vigo ===
The festival takes its name from the "punto de vista documentado" (documented perspective) about which the filmmaker used to talk, and since 2007, we have been presenting the Jean Vigo award to the best director.

On the frontier between silent film and the talkies, at a time when historic vanguards needed renovation so as not to fall into repetitive and academic patterns, outside of artistic circles and movements, and from a strange solitude shared with his wife Lydu Lozinska, Jean Vigo approached cinema with the daring of an amateur.

As Maximilian Le Cain indicates in Senses of Cinema, from the outset his film "was rooted in a documentary practice that simultaneously transcended the documentary". He was perhaps the first person capable of demonstrating, as Miguel Marías wrote, the compatibility "between the two basic trends into which film is artificially split: photographic, objective, neutral, realistic, documentary and non-narrative; and theatrical, subjectivist, fantastical and manipulating, fictional and progressively interested in the dramatic construction of the story and the stylisation of images".

His strived to recapitulate and synthesise what cinema had been up until then. But more than that, his was a labour of the future: in Jean Vigo's cinema, some of the most innovative and vigorous seams that run through film in general and non-fiction in particular can be glimpsed. Jean Vigo filmed the people of his time, but he did it in a way that transcended time. His cinema spans decades, cinematographic movements and generations and strike us every time as a fascinating exercise in modernity.

Jean Vigo shot each film as if it was the last; but at the same time, each of his shots as if it was the first. With the daring and innocence of someone doing it for the first time. That's why whenever we think about Jean Vigo we always imagine the recasting of cinema. In him, thirty years of film flowed together and from him all the later revolutions were born.

In all its editions, the Punto de Vista Festival has shown its interest in supporting documentary films, since its creators consider that they are creations that do not have as much space in other places as auteur cinema. In its first edition, it paid tribute to Jean Vigo with the screening of his complete work, and the presence of Luce Vigo, daughter of the French director and bearer of her father's memory.

== Ideology of the Festival ==
- To Punto de Vista, a documentary is a meeting point. The term documentary refers to the subjective relationship we establish as spectators with a specific audiovisual object. The documentary is, therefore, a meeting place.
- Punto de Vista is a space where encounters occur at different levels, in an innovative, groundbreaking spirit. The International Documentary Film Festival of Navarre, Punto de Vista, is a meeting place on several different levels. Firstly, it is a space for audiences, filmmakers and theorists to relate and interact around the documentary genre and all trans-frontier manifestations and heterodoxies of non-fiction. Secondly, it is a spatial and temporal meeting space. Punto de Vista aims increasingly to become a place where documentary film from all around the world can converge. But it also strives to offer a space for dialogue between the past and future of documentary film. A space where the most diverse traditions in non-fictional film can embrace the most daring and innovative proposals. Punto de Vista, therefore, sees itself as a dialogic space where all these encounters can occur with an ambitious and innovative determination.
- Punto de Vista focuses on those filmmakers who take risks and make bold statements with their work, always on the quest. One of the fundamental aims of the Festival is to attend to audiovisual creators who turn their work into a daring proposal, a kind of search or quest; those who conceive their work as a process of knowing and understanding human beings and their living conditions in specific social contexts; authors who, through their work, reflect on reality and the ethical relationship formed with both the subjects of their formal proposals and their audiences. The Festival aims to be a stopover for filmmakers that will broaden their perception of reality and the ways in which they express it and conceive it through the audiovisual medium. Ultimately, the Festival is open to all documentary films that represent a reflection and an endeavour to understand reality.
- Punto de Vista appreciates filmmakers' moral commitment to the subjects in their films and the audiences that watch them. For Punto de Vista, the essential ethical commitment of the documentary maker to reality passes through the triangular relationship established with the subjects of the works and the audiences through the audiovisual medium.
- The Official Selection of Punto de Vista encourages the understanding of reality and the independent forms of expression. Through its different sections, but especially through its international competition, Punto de Vista raises awareness of films that understand non-fiction as a truly independent and socially necessary means of expression.
- Punto de Vista celebrates non-fiction film. Finally, the aim of the Festival is to foster encounters between filmmakers and audiences through the proposal of shared knowledge represented by their films. The Festival will attempt, at the same time, to spark debate and theoretical reflection. The Festival is a celebration of documentary film and non-fiction in general.

== X Films project ==
Navarre documentary film festival Punto de Vista launched in 2010 a project in order to offer emerging Spanish documentary makers the opportunity to shoot in Navarre an essay-like formaudiovisual creation. X Films Project, initiative of Punto de Vista and the Department of Culture, Sports and Youth of the Government of Navarra, recovers the spirit of the Navarre X Films producer, founded by Juan Huarte in 1963 with the idea of producing films that “show a singular artistic interest or represent special values” andspecialized in risky productions, betting by most innovative, ambitious and experimental films, until 80s, when the film producer disappeared.

The aim of this Project is double: on the one hand, provide directors the possibility to develop new works; on the other hand, year on year those workscreate a group of pieces which means an approach to new voices of the documentary to the people of Navarre. Thus, over time a polyhedral approach to Navarre will be generated and, at the same time, mainly, X Films Project foster no fiction audio-visual creations and Punto de Vista becomes a must in innovative spirit documentary makers’ agenda.

Process:

- Every year, this festival invites three documental film directors – with a suitable profileto the project- to take part of it. Selected artists have to prepare an audio-visual essay project to be shot in Navarre and presented that year during the festival or the seminar Punto de Vista.
- Additionally, a selection committee composed of three experts come from professional fields that are interested in work of this new audiovisual talents is created: producers, programmers, persons in charge of the audio-visual area of museums, directors of film festivals, specialized journalists, etc.
- Directors and experts taking part in this festival are selected by artistic and executive management of Punto de Vista.
- Every director has its own space within the festival or seminar schedule to display an assortment of the last three years of his/her work before the audience and the selection committee.
- Once all participants show their work and audio-visual essay projects, selection committee then decides which project is going to be produced by Punto de Vista film festival.
- The selected director should made an audiovisual essay, a kind of audiovisual writing in first person, which is going to be presented during the next edition of the festival. This piece shall have a minimum duration of 20 minutes.

== Prizes ==
- Punto de Vista Grand Prize for Best Film
- Special Jury Commendation (in the category of Best Film)
- Jean Vigo prize for Best Director
- Prize for Best Short
- Special Jury Commendation (in the category of Best Short)
- Audience's Special Prize for Best Film
- Youth Prize for best Film

== Results ==
15th EDITION. 2021

- Punto de Vista Grand Prize for Best Film The Works and Days (of Tayoko Shiojiri in the Shiotani Basin), by C.W. Winter & Anders Endström. 2020. USA, Sweden, Japan, United Kingdom. 480’.
- Special Jury Commendation (in the category of Best Film) Bicentenario, by Pablo Álvarez Mesa. 2020. Canada, Colombia. 43’
- Jean Vigo prize for Best Director Surviving You, Always, by Morgan Quaintance. 2020. United Kingdom. 18’
- Prize for Best Short Amaryllis – a study, by Jayne Parker. 2020. United Kingdom. 7’
- Special Jury Commendation (in the category of Best Short) Signal 8, by Simon Liu. 2019. Hong Kong, USA 14’
- Audience's Special Prize for Best Film In Ictu Oculi (begiak hesteko artean), by Jorge Moneo Quintana. 2020. Spain. 15’
- Youth Prize for best Film This Day Won't Last, by Mouaad el Salem. 2020. Tunisia, Belgika. 26’

14th EDITION. 2020

- Punto de Vista First Prize ex aequo Un film dramatique, by Eric Baudelaire. 2019. France. 114’. Apiyemiyekî, by Ana Vaz. 2019. Brazil, France, Portugal, Netherlands. 28’
- Prize for the Best Director Jean Vigo Once Removed, by Lawrence Abu Hamdan. 2019. Liban. 29’
- Prize for the Best Short Film Now, at last!, by Ben Rivers. 2019. Brazil, United Kingdom. 39’
- Jury's Special mention Queen, by Kathryn Elkin. 2019. United Kingdom. 13’ Aquí y allá, by Melisa Liebenthal. 2020. Argentina, Francia. 21’.
- The Audience's Special Prize for best Film Overseas, by Sung-A Yoon. 2019. Belgium, France. 90’
- Youth Prize for best Film Queen, by Kathryn Elkin. 2019. United Kingdom. 13’

13th EDITION. 2019

- Punto de Vista First Prize Una Luna de Hierro, by Francisco Rodríguez. Chile, Francia. 2017. 29'.
- Prize for the Best Director Parsi, by Eduardo Williams. Argentina, Francia, Zambia. 2019. 23'.
- Prize for the Best Short Film Mum's Cards, by Luke Fowler. England. 2018. 9'.
- Jury's Special mention Altiplano, by Malena Slzam. Canadá, Chile, Argentina. 2018. 16'.
- Jury's Special mention Vever (for Barbara), by Deborah Stratman. USA. 2019. 12'.
- The Audience's Special Prize for best Film Ojo Guareña, by Edurne Rubio. Belgium, Spain. 2018. 56'.
- Youth Prize for best Film The Sun Quartet, Part 2: San Juan River, by Colectivo Los Ingrávidos. Mexico. 2018. 13'.

12th EDITION. 2018

- Punto de Vista First Prize Flores, by Jorge Jácome. Portugal. 2017. 27'.
- Prize for the Best Director Elohim, or Divine Beings, the Energy of Light as Creation, by Nathaniel Dorsky. USA. 2017. 31'.
- Prize for the Best Short Film Optimism, by Deborah Stratman. USA. 2018. 15'.
- The Audience's Prize Young & Beautiful, by Marina Lameiro. Spain. 2018. 72'.
- Youth Prize Flores, by Jorge Jácome. Portugal. 2017. 27'.

11th EDITION. 2017

- Punto de Vista First Prize The Host, by Miranda Pennell. United Kingdom. 2015. 60'.
- Prize for the Best Director La deixième nuit, by Eric Pauwels. Belgium. 2016. 75'.
- Prize for the Best Short Film Foyer, by Ismaïl Bahri. Tunisia, France. 2016. 31'.
- The Audience's Prize Converso, by David Arratibel. Spain. 2017. 61'.
- Youth Prize 5 October, by Martin Kollar. Slovakia, Czech Republic. 2016. 50'.

10th EDITION. 2016

- Punto de Vista First Prize Oleg y las raras artes, by Andrés Duque. Spain. 2016. 70'.
- Prize for the Best Director Lampedusa in Winter, by Jakob Brossmann. United Kingdom. 2015. 93'.
- Prize for the Best Short Film The Meadow, by Jela Hasler. Switzerland. 2015. 9'.
- Special mention Writing on the City, by Keywan Karimi. Iran. 2015. 60'.
- The Audience's Prize Casa Blanca, by Aleksandra Maciuszek. Poland. 2015. 62'.
- Youth Prize Casa Blanca, by Aleksandra Maciuszek. Poland. 2015. 62'.
- Special mention Among Us, by Guido Hendriks. Netherlands. 2014. 23'.
- Darkness Awards Children, by Marah Al Hassa. Siria. 2015. 5'. Another Kind of Girl, by Khaldiya Jubawi. Siria. 2015. 9'. The Girl, Whose Shadow Reflects The Moon, by Walaa Al Alawi. Siria. 2015. 5'.

9th EDITION. 2015

- Punto de Vista First Prize Echo Chamber, by Guillermo Moncayo. Francia, Colombia. 2014. 19'.
- Prize for the Best Director Huellas, by Diego Gutiérrez, Danniel Danniel. México, Holanda. 2014. 58'.
- Prize for the Best Short Film The Blazing World, by Jessica Bardsley. Estados Unidos. 2013. 19'.
- The Audience's Prize Our Terrible Country, by Mohammad Ali Atassi, Ziad Homsi. Siria, Líbano. 2014. 85'.
- Youth Prize Our Terrible Country, by Mohammad Ali Atassi, Ziad Homsi. Siria, Líbano. 2014. 85'.
- Rencontres Cinématografiques de Cerbère-Portbou Award Before We Go, by Jorge León. Bélgica. 2014. 82'

8th EDITION. 2013

- Punto de Vista First Prize Apuda, de He Yuan. China, 2010. 145'.
- Prize for the Best Director Dad's Stick, de John Smith. United Kingdom, 2012. 5'.
- Prize for the Best Short Film Toma Dos, de Pilar Álvarez. Cuba, 2012. 11'.
- The Audience's Prize A World Not Ours, de Mahdi Fleifel. United Kingdom, Lebanon, Denmark, 2012. 93'.
- Special mention The Florestine Collection, de Paul Gailiunas y Helen Hill. USA, 2010. 31'.
- Special mention El modelo, de Germán Scelso. Spain, 2012. 45'.

7th EDITION. 2011

- Punto de Vista First Prize Foreign Parts, by J. P. Sniadecki & Verena Paravel,. USA, 2010. 80'.
- Prize for the Best Director The Arbor, by Clio Barnard. United Kingdom, 2010. 90'.
- Prize for the Best Short Film Translating Edwin Honig: A Poet's Alzheimer, by Alan Berliner. USA. 2010. 19'.
- The Audience's Prize Color perro que huye, by Andrés Duque. Spain, 2010. 70'.
- Special mention 48, by Susana de Sousa. Portugal, 2009. 93'.
- Special mention Ici Bas, by Comes Chahbazian. Belgium / France, 2010. 55'.

6th EDITION. 2010

- Punto de Vista First Prize Let Each One Go Where He May, by Ben Russell. Suriminam / USA, 2009. 135'.
- Prize for the Best Director Los materiales, by Los hijos. Spain, 2009. 75'.
- Prize for the Best Short Film Amanar Tamasheq, by Lluis Escartin. Spain, 2010. 14'.
- The Audience's Prize Sweetgrass, by Lucien Castaing-Taylor & Ilisa Barbash. France / USA. / United Kingdom, 2009. 101'.
- Special mention Le plein pays, by Antoine Boutet. France, 2009. 58'.
- Special mention The Darkness Of Day, by Jay Rosenblatt. USA, 2009. 26'.

5th EDITION. 2009

- Punto de Vista First Prize Alicia en el País, by Esteban Larrain. Chile, 2008. 86'.
- Prize for the Best Director Olivier Dury, for Mirages. France, 2008. 45'.
- Prize for the Best Short Film Lost World, by Gyula Nemes. Hungary / Finland, 2008. 20'.
- The Audience's Prize Intimidades de Shakespeare y Victor Hugo, by Yulene Olaizola. Mexico, 2008. 83'.
- Special mention Intimidades de Shakespeare y Victor Hugo, by Yulene Olaizola. Mexico, 2008. 83'.

4th EDITION. 2008

- Punto de Vista First Prize Bingai, by Feng Yan. China, 2007. 114'.
- Prize for the Best Director Her Dear Old House, by Tatsuya Yamamoto. Japan, 2006. 80'.
- Prize for the Best Short Film 52 Percent, by Rafal Skalski. Poland, 2007. 20'.
- The Audience's Prizev Tovarisch, I Am Not Dead, by Stuart Urban. United Kingdom, 2007. 85'.
- Special mention Just Read After My Death, by Morgan Dews. USA, 2007. 72'.
- Special mention A Story Of People In War And Peace, by Vardan Hovhannisyan. Armenia, 2007. 70'.

3rd EDITION. 2007

- Punto de Vista First Prize Forever, by Heddy Honigmann. Netherlands, 2006. 95'.
- Prize for the Best Director The Clinic by Tomasz Wolski. Poland, 2006. 30'.
- Prize for the Best Short Film Even If She Had Been a Criminal…, by Jean-Gabriel Périot. France, 2006. 10'.
- The Audience's Prize Radiophobia, by Julio Soto. Spain, 2005. 54'.
- Special mention Our America, by Kristina Konrad. Switzerland, 2005. 84'.
- Special mention Orange Winter, by Andrei Zagdansky. USA / Ukraine, 2006. 72'.

2nd EDITION. 2006

- Punto de Vista First Prize, ex aequo Sonia, by Nathalie Delaunoy (Belgium, 2008. 48'). Melodies, by François Bovy (Switzerland, 2005, 67').
- Prize for the Best Director Melodies, by François Bovy. Switzerland, 2005, 67'.
- Prize for the Best Short Film Le pont sur la Drina, by Xavier Lukomski. Belgium, 2005. 19'.
- The Audience's Prize The Play, by Pelin Esmer Turkey, 2005. 70'.
- Special mention La Casa de mi abuela, by Adán Aliaga. Spain, 2005. 80'.
- Special mention Phantom Limb, by Jay Rosenblatt. USA, 2005. 28'.
- Special mention Tierra negra, by Ricardo Iscar. Spain, 2004. 92'.

1st EDITION. 2005

- Punto de Vista First Prize Checkpoint, by Yoav Shamir. Israel, 2003. 80'.
- Prize for the Best Director Peter Kerekes, for 66 Seasons. Slovakia, 2003. 86'.
- Prize for the Best Short Film Good Times, by Alessandro Cassigoli & Dalia Castel. Italy-Israel, 2004. 31'.
- Prize for the Best Screenplay Mojado-El documental indocumentado, by Arturo Pérez Torres. Canada, 2004. 98'.
- The Audience's Prize Bandits, by Zaza Rusadze. Georgia, 2003. 52'.
- Special mention Platicando, by Mª Luisa Lafuente. Spain, 2004. 25'.
- Special mention Dr Nagesh, by Vicent Detours & Dominique Henry. Belgium, 2004. 51'.

== Sources ==
- Official Site
- Noticia del Premio Jean Vigo al mejor director
- Reportaje sobre la segunda edición de Punto de Vista en Miradas.net
- Reportaje de la primera edición de Punto de Vista en Trendesombras.com Tren de sombras
- Reportaje en el diario El Mundo
- Avance de programación 2007
