= No Hard Feelings (2020 film) =

2020 German drama film

- Film poster
- German: Futur Drei
- Directed by: Faraz Shariat
- Written by: Faraz Shariat; Paulina Lorenz
- Produced by: Paulina Lorenz; Raquel Molt; Faraz Shariat
- Starring: Benjamin Radjaipour; Eidin Jalali; Banafshe Hourmazdi
- Cinematography: Simon Vu
- Edited by: Friederike Hohmuth
- Music by: Jakob Hüffell, SÄYE SKYE
- Release date: 23 February 2020 (Berlin)
- Running time: 92 minutes
- Country: Germany
- Languages: German; Persian

No Hard Feelings (German: Futur Drei) is a German drama film, directed by Faraz Shariat and released in 2020. The film stars Benjamin Radjaipour as Parvis, a confident but immature young man of Iranian descent living in Germany, who commits a minor criminal infraction and is sentenced to perform community service at a refugee detention centre, where he falls in love with newly immigrated Amon (Eidin Jalali).

The film premiered at the 2020 Berlin Film Festival, where it won the Teddy Award for best LGBTQ-themed feature film. At the 2020 Inside Out Film and Video Festival, it was named the winner of the award for Best First Feature Film.

== Plot ==
Parvis is the son of exiled Iranians and lives with his parents in Hildesheim. He enjoys freedoms that many young Germans can only dream of. His parents accept that he's gay, and he enjoys Grindr dates and late club nights. After being shoplifted, he has to do his 120 hours of community service as a translator in a housing project for refugees. There he is initially eyed strangely because he looks strange with his bleached hair and is not very skilful with some tasks. He also takes part in the talks in which decisions are to be made about their further stay, and translates intentionally incorrectly in order to prevent their deportation.

He meets the Iranian refugee Amon, who is waiting there with his sister Banafshe for their residence permits. Amon is asked by the other young men in the project not to have any contact with the oddball. Amon doesn't immediately understand that Parvis isn't a resident of the project, he's only there for his community service. Amon shares a room with his sister, who quickly notices that her brother likes Parvis and helps them get closer. After a night of partying together, the three go to his house together. Amon helps the completely drunk Parvis bathe, and a first kiss follows. Banafshe learns from her mother the background to her flight and what the new start in Germany was like for her back then. Later she tells her son that they set it all up in Germany just for him.

A project worker recommends a protective marriage to Banafshe because she is threatened with deportation and immediately offers to marry her. On the day that Parvis works on the project for the last time, Banafshe is warned that the police are on their way to arrange for her deportation. She wants to leave the project, but Parvis gets her and her brother out of town first.

== Cast ==
- Benjamin Radjaipour as Parvis
- Banafshe Hourmazdi as Banafshe Arezu
- Eidin Jalali as Amon
- Mashid Shariat as Parvis' Mutter(as Mashid)
- Nasser Shariat as Parvis' Vater(as Nasser)
- Maryam Zaree as Mina
- Abak Safaei-Rad as Maretta
- Jürgen Vogel as Jan
- Knut Berger as Robert
