= If It Were Love =

- French: Si c'était de l'amour
- Directed by: Patric Chiha
- Produced by: Charlotte Vincent
- Cinematography: Jordane Chouzenoux
- Edited by: Anna Riche
- Production company: Aurora Films
- Release date: February 22, 2020 (Berlinale)
- Running time: 82 minutes
- Country: France
- Language: French

If It Were Love (French: Si c'était de l'amour) is a French documentary film, directed by Patric Chiha and released in 2020. The film profiles the professional and personal lives of the dancers in Crowd, a touring piece by choreographer Gisèle Vienne about the rave scene of the 1990s.

The film had its theatrical premiere in February 2020 in the Panorama Dokumente stream at the 70th Berlin International Film Festival, where it won the award for Best Documentary from the Teddy Award program for LGBTQ-themed films.

The film had its public theatrical premiere in France in March 2020.
