= Edmonton International Film Festival =

Nine-day film festival

Coordinates: 53°32′37″N 113°29′30″W

- Logo for the Edmonton International Film Festival Festival
- Location: Landmark Cinemas 9 City Centre, Edmonton, Alberta
- Predecessor: Local Heroes Film Festival
- Established: 1986
- Hosted by: Edmonton International Film Festival Group
- No. of films: 100 - 200
- Language: International
- Website: edmontonfilmfest.com

The Edmonton International Film Festival (EIFF) is a nine-day film festival in Edmonton, Alberta, Canada, hosted at Landmark Cinemas at Edmonton City Centre. It is supported by and partnered with Telefilm Canada, Government of Alberta, Alberta Foundation for the Arts, Edmonton City Council, and the Edmonton Arts Council.

The festival schedule consists of over 150 films of various genres, ranging from short to feature-length, domestic to foreign, studio to independent, and from dramatic work to documentary. The EIFF showcases films that are produced within 20 months of each festival, selected on the basis of story, quality, and originality. The Festival also presents, other films that have garnered a 'buzz' around the festival circuit, along with filmmaker talks, Q&As, gala screenings, spotlights on local filmmakers, and shorts with lunch, among others.

EIFF is an Oscar-qualifying festival for short films (live action and animation): winning at this festival can make a film eligible to win an Academy Award. The two short films that win the EIFF Grand Jury Award are chosen by an international jury and of five industry peers, after which they are eligible for Oscar consideration in the accompanying year. Lunchbox Shorts is a series of select EIFF short-film programs (curated from thousands of submissions) that are presented throughout the lunch hour over the festival, with lunch included in its ticket price.

From 2015 through 2017, and in 2019, MovieMaker has listed EIFF as one of "50 film festivals worth the entry fee." The 35th Annual EIFF is scheduled for the week of October 1–10, 2021.

== History ==
It began in 1986 as Local Heroes Film Festival—a smaller, 3-day film festival in March. Over time, the festival grew in size and scope; in 2003, the festival was moved to September, expanded to 9-days, and renamed the Edmonton International Film Festival.

Since its creation, EIFF has welcomed veteran and emerging filmmakers, actors, writers, and producers alike, hosting such talent as Jon Cryer, Thom Fitzgerald, Paul Gross, Werner Herzog, Norman Jewison, Naomi Klein, Jørgen Leth, Avi Lewis, Neil Mandt, Luke Matheny, Albert Maysles, Bruce McDonald, Don McKellar, Deepa Mehta, Molly Parker, Patrick Warburton, John Waters, Shea Whigham, among others.

For the 2010 festival, organizers planned on 55 feature-length and 100 short films, all shown at the Empire Theatres in the Edmonton City Centre.

=== 2020 ===
In 2020, the 34th Edmonton International Film Festival consisted of a program of over 130 short films and 30 feature films. That year, given the COVID-19 pandemic, the EIFF was presented for the first time by subscriber-based Super Channel. Super Channel broadcast 20 short films and 20 feature films, each feature being shown only once over 10 days. From October 1 to 10, EIFF was also hosted at Edmonton City Centre's Landmark Cinemas (at 25% capacity), where 22 short films and all 30 features were projected.

In 2020, the two winners of the Grand Jury Award for Short Film were The Bear and the Beekeeper (live action) and If Anything Happens I Love You (animated).

34th EIFF, select feature films
Film	Director	Country	Genre
Ammonite	Frances Lee	UK/Australia/USA	Drama/Romance
Barefoot Warriors	Kavi Raz	Canada/India	Drama/Sports/Comedy
Balikbayan Project: From Victims to Survivors	Jon Jon Rivero, Rob Hillstead	Canada	Documentary
Black Bear	Lawrence Michael Levine	USA	Drama/Suspense
The Color Rose	Courtney Paige	Canada	Drama/Murder Mystery/Horror/Teen Cult
Digger	Georgis Grigorakis	Greece	Drama/Western
The Father	Florian Zeller	UK	Drama
Fully Realized Humans	Joshua Leonard	USA	Drama/Comedy
Happy Place	Helen Shaver	Canada	Drama/Thriller
How to Be a Good Wife	Martin Provost	France	Comedy
Mogul Mowgli	Bassam Tariq	UK/USA	Drama
My Salinger Year	Philippe Falardeau	Canada	Drama/Comedy
Percy	Clark Johnson	USA	Drama/Biography
Possessor	Brandon Cronenberg	UK/Canada	Sci-Fi/Thriller
The Rose Maker	Pierre Pinaud	France	Drama/Comedy
