= Rover (musician) =

French musician and composer (born 1979)

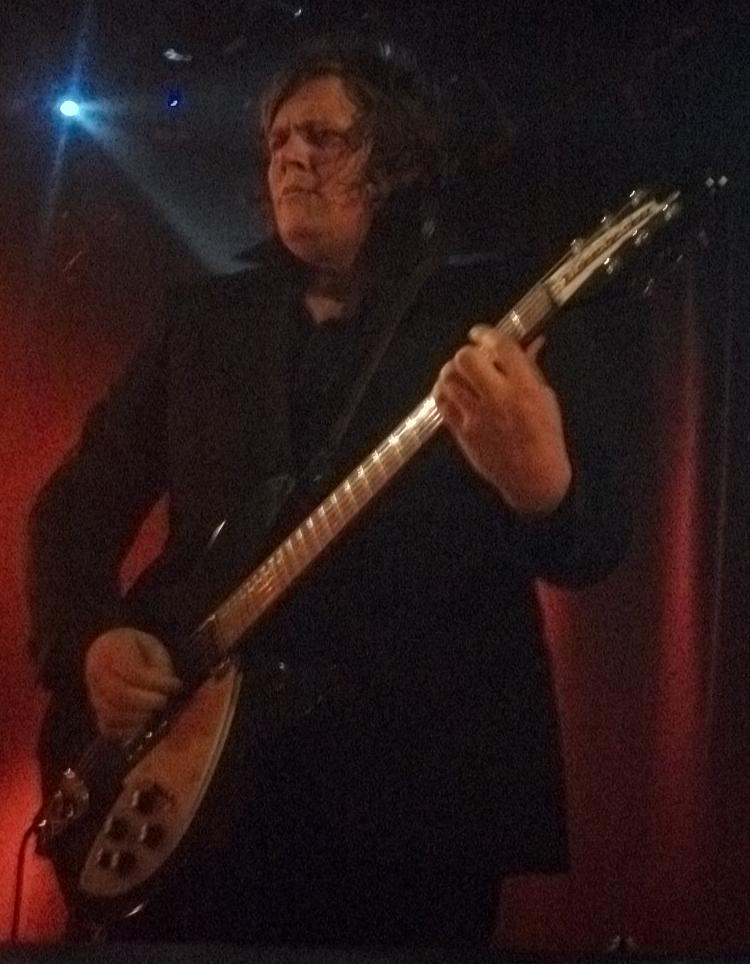
- Rover performing in 2012

Background information
- Birth name: Timothée Régnier
- Born: 24 September 1979 (age 45); Paris, France
- Occupations: Musician; songwriter; composer; actor
- Instruments: Bass; guitar; piano
- Years active: 2005–present
- Labels: Wagram, Cinq7
- Formerly of: The New Government
- Website: rover-music.com

Timothée Régnier, better known by his stage name Rover, is a French musician, composer, and occasional actor from Paris who sings primarily in English. Active since 2005, he has released three studio albums, scored several films, as well as making a number of appearances in television shows and movies.

== Biography ==
=== Early life and career beginnings: 1979–2008 ===
Born on 24 September 1979, Timothée Régnier is the son of expatriates. From the age of seven, he lived in New York City, where he attended the French high school, along with Julian Casablancas and Nikolai Fraiture of the Strokes.

In 2008, after living in Beirut, Lebanon, for three years and playing guitar in the Franco-Lebanese punk rock group the New Government, which also included his brother Jérémie Régnier and Lebanese musician Zeid Hamdan, he was expelled due to issues with his visa.

=== Solo recordings: 2011–present ===
After returning to France, Régnier decided to write and publish his own music, adopting the moniker Rover. He moved to his family's house in Côtes-d'Armor, Brittany, where he recorded the four-track, eponymous EP Rover, on which he played all instruments. Produced by Samy Osta, the record was released in 2011, and a year later, followed by a full-length album of the same name. The 2012 release was nominated for a Victoires de la Musique award in the New Discovery category (Victoire du groupe ou artiste révélation du public), which was ultimately won by C2C. In 2013, the album was re-released with a bonus disc and retitled Reel to Reel.

In November 2015, Rover published his second studio album, Let It Glow. After a hiatus of several years, the musician released his third album, titled Eiskeller.

=== Soundtracks ===
Régnier has contributed music to and scored entire movie soundtracks. His contributions include the 2009 film Montparnasse, in which he also has a small role; 2010's Le Jour de la grenouille, where he appears as the minor character Donald; and one episode of the television series Alex Hugo (2014). He has composed music for the 2010 documentary The Day Before Disclosure and the 2013 drama film Tonnerre.

== Discography ==
Studio albums

- Rover (2012)
- Rover + Reel to Reel (2013 reissue)
- Let It Glow (2015)
- Eiskeller (2021)

EPs

- Rover (2011)
- Anywhere from Now! (2013)

Soundtracks

- Montparnasse (2009)
- Le Jour de la grenouille (2010)
- The Day Before Disclosure (2010)
- Tonnerre (2013)
- Alex Hugo (2014)
- Tom (2022)

== Selected filmography ==
List of film and television appearances, with year, title, and role shown
Year	Title	Role	Notes
2007	Primorose Hill	Marc's friend	
2009	Montparnasse	Jeremy	
2010	Robert Mitchum est mort	Car salesman	
2010	Le Jour de la grenouille	Donald	
2013	Les Yeux fermés		
2016	Orphan		
2019	Mike	Doctor	Television series – 2 episodes
2019	A Bigger World	Studio singer	
