= Three (2020 film) =

2020 film

- Directed by: Ruslan Pak
- Written by: Ruslan Pak; Anna Ovcharov
- Produced by: Ruslan Pak
- Starring: Askar Ilyasov; Igor Savochkin; Samal Yeslyamova
- Cinematography: Kim Hyung-jun
- Edited by: Son Yeon-ji
- Production company: Arslan Film
- Release dates: 25 October 2020 (Busan); 21 April 2022 (South Korea)
- Running time: 101 minutes
- Countries: Kazakhstan; South Korea
- Languages: Kazakh, Russian

Three (Russian: Три) is a 2020 Kazakh-South Korean crime thriller film directed by Ruslan Pak. It is based on the true story of Nikolai Dzhumagaliev. The film stars Askar Ilyasov, Igor Savochkin and Samal Yeslyamova. It was released theatrically on 21 April 2022.

== Cast ==
- Askar Ilyasov as Sher Sadikhov
- Igor Savochkin as Oleg Snegirev
- Samal Yeslyamova as Dina Sadikhov
- Nurzhan Sadybekov as Daniyar
- Zhandos Aibassov as Alik Korazhanov
- Tolganay Talgat as Alina

== Reception ==
=== Accolades ===
Year	Award	Category	Recipient(s)	Result	Ref(s)
2020	25th Busan International Film Festival	New Currents Award	Ruslan Pak	Won	
2021	43rd Moscow International Film Festival	NETPAC Jury Prize	Ruslan Pak	Nominated	
