= Ainaa Jhyal Ko Putali =

2020 Nepalese film written & directed by Sujit Bidari

- Theatrical release poster, designed by Sandeep Badal
- Nepali: ऐना झ्यालको पुतली
- Directed by: Sujit Bidari
- Written by: Sujit Bidari
- Produced by: Prabin Syangbo; Aakash Poudel; Sujit Bidari; Ram Krishna Pokharel
- Starring: Kanchan Chimariya; Dinesh Khatri; Siru Bista; Bisha Chamling Rai
- Cinematography: Amar Maharjan
- Edited by: Kiran Shrestha
- Music by: Sangam Panta
- Production companies: Icefall Productions; Local Cinema
- Release dates: October 2020 (Busan); September 9, 2022 (Nepal)
- Country: Nepal
- Language: Nepali
- Budget: est.रू1.25 crore (US$83,000)
- Box office: रू63.2 lakh (US$42,000)

Ainaa Jhyal Ko Putali (Nepali: ऐना झ्यालको पुतली; transl. Butterfly on the Windowpane) is a 2020 Nepali coming-of-age film written and directed by Sujit Bidari under the banner of Icefall Productions and Local Cinema. The film is Nepal's submission for the 95th Academy Awards for Best International Feature Film. It is the first Nepali film to compete for prize worth of 30,000 US dollars in 25th Busan International Film Festival for the category New Currents in 2020. Bidari also won the best director award in 2022 Dhaka International Film Festival. Released on September 9, 2022, the film stars Kanchan Chimariya, Dinesh Khatri, Siru Bista, and Ashok Shiwakoti, with the first two making their film debuts; similarly it was the first film for most of the actors who worked on it. The title of the film is inspired by a poem of Madhav Prasad Ghimire with the same title.

== Synopsis ==
When he sees that his 13-year-old sister Bidya (Kanchan Chimariya) is losing her strength and becoming less of the strong person with goals she once had, 9-year-old Basanta (Dinesh Khatri) attempts to help her by trying to boost her confidence. The title of the movie alludes to Bidya's situation, in which she is trapped like a butterfly on a windowpane.

== Cast ==
- Kanchan Chimariya as Bidya Adhikari
- Dinesh Khatri as Basanta Adhikari
- Siru Bista as Bidya and Basanta's mom
- Ashok Shiwakoti as Bidya and Basanta's dad
- Umesh Shrestha as Bange
- Bisha Chamling Rai as Bidya's mitini
- Raj Thapa as Tule
- Mallika Shrestha as Paarey
- Prasanna Poudel as Gokul

== Soundtrack ==
Mero Gaun Jyamire was released on August 29, 2022. Title song, Ainaa Jhyal Ko Putali was released on September 7, 2022.

No.	Title	Lyrics	Singer(s)	Length
1.	"Ainaa Jhyal Ko Putali - Title Song"	Hark Saud	Sushant Gautam	3:22
2.	"Mero Gaun Jyamire"	Rambabu Subedi	Temdo Tshering Gurung, Angamu Lama	2:57
Total length:				6:19

== Reception ==
=== Box office ===
According to the Film Development Board, Ainaa Jhyal Ko Putali grossed approximately 63.2 lakh in Nepal, which makes it commercially unsuccessful.

=== Critical response ===
Ainaa Jhyal Ko Putali received mostly positive reviews from critics and the audience.

Diwakar Pyakurel from Online Khabar rated the film 4 out of 5 and mentioned "Even if this has apparent flaws and fails commercially, stakeholders of the Nepali film industry, the audience included, need to give it a sincere look and think about the different messages the film imparts – for both content and presentation."

Rina Moktan from Kantipur wrote "The entry of narrators like director Bidari is a new hope for the film industry. With characters drawn from Nepali society, 'Ainaa Jhyal Ko Putali' can be called a story of Nepali soil. The film sector has got a good storyteller through 'Ainaa Jhyal Ko Putali', which has come close to the recognition of Nepali films."

Bhesraj Karki from Makalu Khabar wrote "Ainaa Jhyal Ko Putali is a story of a village, and it finish there, but it also serves to highlight the issues, charm, and potential of the city. The number of filmmakers in Nepal who use the same technique and original stories has increased over the last few years. It is appreciated, but this time the flavor is sweet and healthy."

== Accolades ==
Year	Awards	Category	Nominee	Result	Ref(s)
2020	25th Busan International Film Festival	New Currents	Ainaa Jhyal Ko Putali	Nominated	
2022	20th Dhaka International Film Festival	Best Director	Sujit Bidari	Won	
2022	Kautik International Student Film Festival	Best Film	Ainaa Jhyal Ko Putali	Won	
2022	Kautik International Student Film Festival	Best Actress	Kanchan Chimariya	Won	
2022	Kautik International Student Film Festival	Best Actor	Dinesh Khatri	Won	
2022	Kautik International Student Film Festival	Best Editor	Kiran Shrestha	Won	
2023	95th Academy Awards	Best International Feature Film	Ainaa Jhyal Ko Putali	Not nominated	
2023	6th Nepal International Film Festival	Best Film	Ainaa Jhyal Ko Putali	Won	
2023	6th Nepal International Film Festival	Best Script	Sujit Bidari	Won	
2023	6th Nepal International Film Festival	Best Director	Sujit Bidari	Won	
