= Home Front (2020 film) =

2020 film

- Film poster
- French: Des hommes
- Directed by: Lucas Belvaux
- Written by: Laurent Mauvignier
- Starring: Gérard Depardieu
- Release date: 31 August 2020 (Angouleme)
- Running time: 101 minutes
- Country: France
- Language: French

Home Front (French: Des hommes; lit. 'Men') is a 2020 French drama film directed by Lucas Belvaux adapted by a novel of Laurent Mauvignier. It was selected to be shown at the 2020 Cannes Film Festival, which was eventually canceled due to the COVID-19 pandemic. The film premiered in August 2020 at the Angoulême Francophone Film Festival and received general theatrical release in June 2021.

== Synopsis ==
They were sent to Algeria in 1960 during the "events". Two years later, Bernard, Rabut, Février, and others returned to France. They remained silent and lived their lives. But sometimes, it takes almost nothing, like a winter birthday or a small gift, for the past to suddenly come back into the lives of those who thought they could deny it, even forty years later.

== Cast ==
- Gérard Depardieu as Bernard, aka Feu-de-Bois
- Catherine Frot as Solange
- Jean-Pierre Darroussin as Rabut
- Yoann Zimmer as young Bernard
- Edouard Sulpice as young Rabut
- Félix Kysyl as Février
- Clotilde Mollet as Nicole
- Amelle Chahbi as Mrs Chefraou

== Release ==
- Label Festival de Cannes 2020
- Angoulême Francophone Film Festival 2020 : out of competition
- Brussels Film Festival 2020 : opening film
- Deauville American Film Festival 2020 : out of competition
- International Historical Fiction Film Festival 2020 : official selection
