= Chimère (film) =

1989 film

- Directed by: Claire Devers
- Written by: Claire Devers; Arlette Langmann
- Produced by: Jean Achache; Philippe Carcassonne
- Starring: Béatrice Dalle
- Cinematography: Renato Berta
- Edited by: Hélène Viard
- Music by: John Surman
- Distributed by: UGC Distribution
- Release date: 31 May 1989
- Running time: 94 minutes
- Country: France
- Language: French

Chimère is a 1989 French drama film directed by Claire Devers. It was entered into the 1989 Cannes Film Festival.

== Cast ==
- Béatrice Dalle - Alice
- Wadeck Stanczak - Léo
- Francis Frappat - Fred
- Julie Bataille - Mimi
- Adriana Asti - Alice's mother
- Pierre Grunstein - Alice's father
- Christophe Odent - Paul
- Toni Cecchinato - Gino
- Isabelle Candelier - The colleague
- Robert Deslandes - The hunter
- Marilyne Even - The doctor
- Isabelle Renauld - The nurse
