= A Common Crime =

2020 film

- Film poster
- Directed by: Francisco Márquez
- Starring: Elisa Carricajo
- Release date: 26 February 2020 (Berlin)
- Running time: 96 minutes
- Country: Argentina
- Language: Spanish

A Common Crime (Spanish: Un crimen común) is a 2020 Argentine drama film directed by Francisco Márquez. It was selected to be shown in the Panorama section at the 70th Berlin International Film Festival.

== Cast ==
- Elisa Carricajo as Cecilia
- Mecha Martinez as Nebe
- Eliot Otazo as Kevin
- Ciro Coien Pardo as Juan
- Cecilia Rainero as Claudia
