= Patric Chiha =

Austrian film director

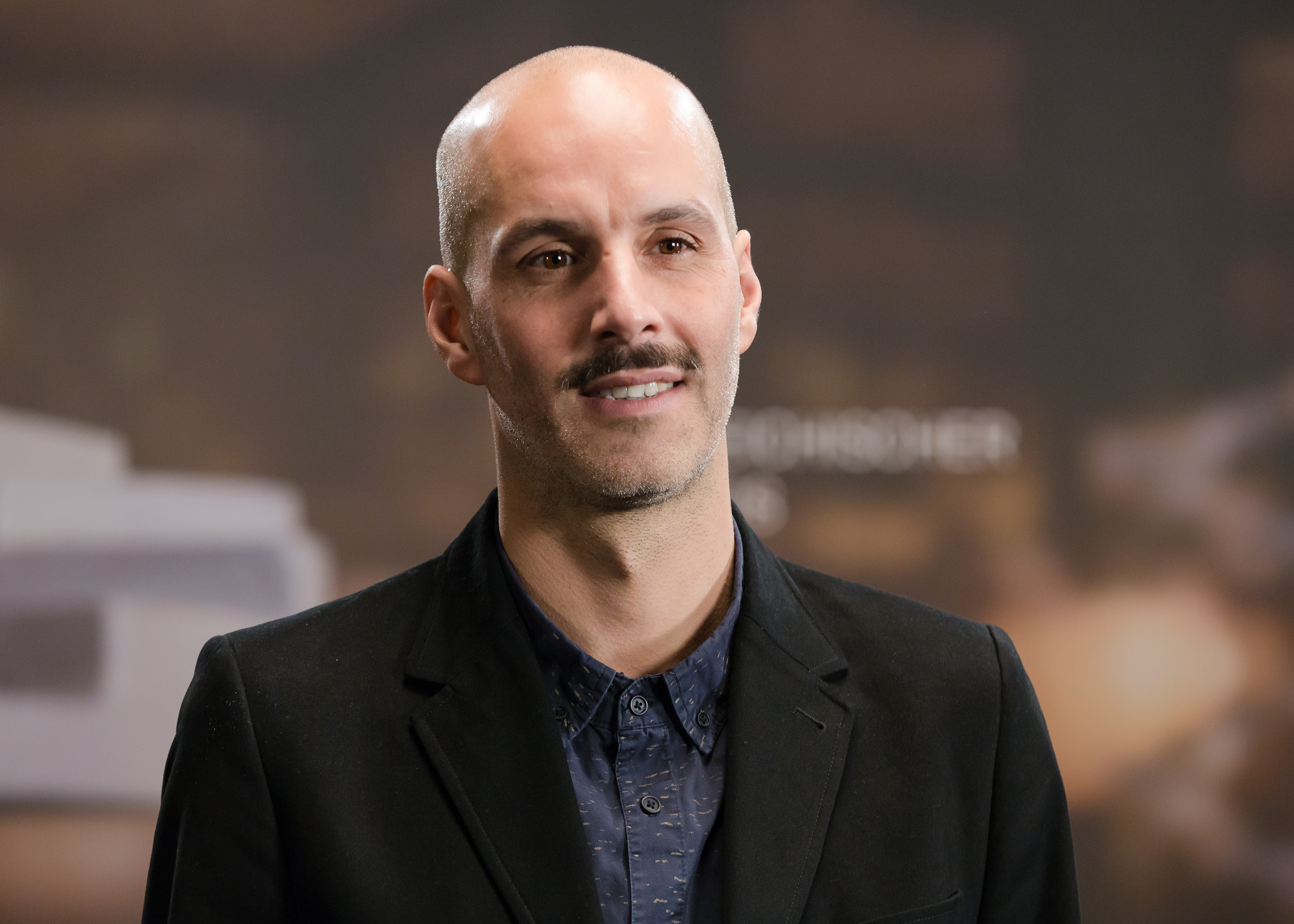
- Chiha in 2017
- Born: 3 March 1975 (age 51); Vienna, Austria
- Occupations: Film director; screenwriter; editor
- Years active: 2000–present

Patric Chiha (born 3 March 1975) is an Austrian film director, screenwriter and film editor of Hungarian and Lebanese origin. After directing several short films and documentaries, his first feature film, Domain (2009), premiered at the 2009 Venice Film Festival. In 2014, he directed his second feature film, Boys Like Us. His documentaries Brothers of the Night (2016), and If It Were Love (2020) were both selected for the Berlin Film Festival. His third feature film, The Beast in the Jungle, was released in 2023.

== Early life ==
Chiha was born in Vienna, Austria on 3 March 1975. He is of Hungarian and Lebanese origin, and has lived in France since the age of 18.

Chiha studied fashion design at ESAA Duperré in Paris and film editing at INSAS in Brussels.

== Career ==
After directing several short films and documentaries, his first feature film, Domain (2009), premiered at the 2009 Venice Film Festival. In 2014, he directed his second feature film, Boys Like Us. His documentaries Brothers of the Night (2016), and If It Were Love (2020) were both selected for the Berlin Film Festival.

His third feature film, The Beast in the Jungle, premiered at the 2023 Berlin Film Festival.

== Filmography ==
Year	Title	Director	Writer	Editor	Notes
2000	Une cicatrice derrière la tête	No	No	Yes	Short film
2003	Bologna centrale	No	No	Yes	Documentary; also cinematographer and assistant director
2004	La visite	No	No	Yes	
2004	La route des hêtres	No	No	Yes	Documentary
2004	Casa Ugalde	Yes	Yes	Yes	Short film
2005	Les messieurs	Yes	No	Yes	Documentary
2006	Home	Yes	Yes	No	Medium-length film
2008	Where Is the Head of the Prison?	Yes	Yes	No	Short film
2009	Domain	Yes	Yes	No	
2014	Boys Like Us	Yes	Yes	No	
2016	Brothers of the Night	Yes	Yes	Yes	Documentary
2020	If It Were Love	Yes	No	No	Documentary
2022	Exalted Mars	No	No	Yes	Short film
2023	The Beast in the Jungle	Yes	Yes	No	
2026	A Russian Winter	Yes	Yes	No	Documentary

== Awards and nominations ==
Athens International Film Festival

Year	Nominated work	Category	Result	Ref
2020	If It Were Love	Golden Athena for Best Documentary	Nominated	

Austrian Film Award

Year	Nominated work	Category	Result	Ref
2017	Brothers of the Night	Best Documentary Film	Nominated	

Berlin Film Festival

Year	Nominated work	Category	Result	Ref
2016	Brothers of the Night	Teddy Award for Best Documentary Film	Nominated	
2020	If It Were Love	Teddy Award for Best Documentary Film	Won	
2023	The Beast in the Jungle	Panorama Audience Award for Best Feature Film	Nominated	

Lumière Awards

Year	Nominated work	Category	Result	Ref
2021	If It Were Love	Best Documentary	Nominated	

Prix Louis-Delluc

Year	Nominated work	Category	Result	Ref
2023	The Beast in the Jungle	Best Film	Pending	

Venice Film Festival

Year	Nominated work	Category	Result	Ref
2009	Domain	International Film Critics' Week Award	Nominated	
2009	Domain	Queer Lion	Nominated	
