= San Francisco Greek Film Festival =

Annual film festival held in San Francisco, USA

- San Francisco Greek Film Festival logo
- Location: San Francisco, United States
- Founded: 2004
- Awards: Jury Awards, The Astron Award, Spyros P. Skouras Lifetime Achievement Award
- Language: Greek
- Website: www.grfilm.com

The San Francisco Greek Film Festival (SFGFF) is a film festival held annually in San Francisco that showcases Greek and Cypriot films and filmmakers from around the world. It is the first and longest-running Greek film festival in the United States. SFGFF is dedicated to recognizing, supporting, and promoting the best film work by Greek and Cypriot filmmakers from around the world. The festival has showcased over 300 movies and hosted 70 filmmakers and more than 15,000 attendees.

== Awards ==
Films at the SFGFF are nominated for the following awards:

- Jury Awards
  - Best Narrative Feature
  - Best Documentary
  - Best Narrative Short
- The Astron Award
  - Awarded annually to the audiences' favourite feature and short films
- Spyros P. Skouras Lifetime Achievement Award
  - Created in 2018, The Spyros P. Skouras Lifetime Achievement Award honors outstanding film industry professionals of Greek descent.

== See also ==
- List of film festivals in North and Central America
- San Francisco
- Cinema of Greece
- Los Angeles Greek Film Festival
- List of Greece-related topics
