= Domain (2009 film) =

- Directed by: Patric Chiha
- Written by: Patric Chiha
- Produced by: Charlotte Vincent
- Starring: Béatrice Dalle
- Cinematography: Pascal Poucet
- Edited by: Karina Ressler
- Music by: Milkymee
- Production companies: Aurora Films; Wildart Film
- Distributed by: Contre-Allée Distribution; Strand Releasing
- Release dates: 5 September 2009 (Venice Film Festival); 14 April 2010 (France)
- Running time: 110 minutes
- Countries: France; Austria
- Language: French
- Budget: $1.5 million
- Box office: $30.000

Domain is a 2009 French film directed by Patric Chiha, starring Béatrice Dalle, Isaïe Sultan, and Alain Libolt. The film has been cited as a favorite by filmmaker John Waters, who presented it as his annual selection within the 2011 Maryland Film Festival.

== Plot ==
A teenage boy is fascinated with his brilliant mathematician and vaguely bohemian aunt, Nadia (Dalle). He becomes drawn to her and her friends, as he also explores his sexuality with an older man in his 20s. Tensions build throughout the film surrounding Nadia's alcoholism and her nephew's own unwillingness to confront it head on, as well as a mysterious much older male acquaintance of Nadia's who seems to have some sinister place in her life and who frequently seems to flirt with her nephew, clearly upsetting her. A crisis leads to her being admitted to a rehab clinic, which her nephew visits to try to maintain their deep connection and help her deal with the confining and frustrating nature of clinical life.

== Reception ==
Beatrice Dalle's performance was described as impressive. On the other hand it was said the film would occasionally repeat itself.
