= Anders Edström =

Swedish film director and photographer

Anders Edström (born 1966) is a Swedish film director and photographer, living in Stockholm, Sweden. His films, made with long-time collaborator C.W. Winter, include The Works and Days (of Tayoko Shiojiri in the Shiotani Basin) (2020).

== Life and work ==
Edström was born in Frösön, Jämtland, Sweden.

In the 1990s he lived in Paris, working as a fashion photographer with Maison Margiela and Purple magazine. He continues to work in fashion.

Edström has had a long-time creative filmmaking collaboration with C.W. Winter. Their feature film The Anchorage (2009) "follows the everyday existence of an elderly woman who lives alone on an island on the Stockholm archipelago." It won the Golden Leopard – Filmmakers of the Present award at the Locarno Film Festival and the Douglas Edwards Experimental/Independent Film/Video Award at the Los Angeles Film Critics Association Awards. Their eight-hour-long fictional film, The Works and Days (of Tayoko Shiojiri in the Shiotani Basin) (2020), is set in the remote rural village of Shiotani, Japan. Edström's photobook, named after the village and published in 2021, documents the literal life of his wife's family there between 1993 and 2015.

== Personal life ==
As of 2009, Edström lived in Tokyo with his wife and two children.

== Films ==
- One Plus One 2 (2003) – with C.W. Winter; starring Derek Bailey
- The Anchorage (2009) – with C.W. Winter
- The Works and Days (of Tayoko Shiojiri in the Shiotani Basin) (2020) – with C.W. Winter

== Publications ==
=== Books by Edström ===
- Waiting Some Birds a Bus a Woman and Spidernets Places a Crew. SteidlMack, 2004. ISBN 978-3865210326.
- Safari. Zurich: Nieves, 2010. ISBN 978-3-905714-58-6.
- Hanezawa Garden. London: Mack, 2015. ISBN 978-1-910164-20-4. With an essay by C.W. Winter in English and Japanese.
- Loops. Estate Of series. London: Antenne, 2020. ISBN 978-1-908806-06-2. In English.
- Shiotani. Japan: AKPE, 2021. ISBN 978-9-151984-33-9. With essays by Jeff Rian and C.W. Winter in English and Japanese.
- Enköping, 1986. AKPE, 2024. With essays by Jeff Rian and C.W. Winter in English and Japanese. ISBN 9789153101963. Edition of 700 copies. Photographs made in and around Enköping, Sweden.

=== Books with others ===
- The Buckshot Lexicon. By Jeff Rian. Paris: Purple Books, 2000. ISBN 9782912684240.
