= The Works and Days =

2020 film

The Works and Days (of Tayoko Shiojiri in the Shiotani Basin)
- French theatrical release poster
- Directed by: C.W. Winter; Anders Edström
- Written by: C.W. Winter
- Produced by: C.W. Winter; Anders Edström; Wang Yue
- Starring: Tayoko Shiojiri
- Cinematography: Anders Edström
- Edited by: C.W. Winter
- Production companies: General Asst.; Silver Salt Films
- Distributed by: Grasshopper Film; Capricci
- Release dates: 21 February 2020 (Berlinale); 16 July 2021 (United States); 22 July 2022 (France)
- Running time: 480 minutes
- Countries: United States; Sweden; Japan; United Kingdom
- Language: Japanese

The Works and Days (of Tayoko Shiojiri in the Shiotani Basin) is a 2020 fiction film directed by C.W. Winter and Anders Edström. It describes life in a farming village, population 47, in the Shiotani basin in the Japanese prefecture of Kyoto. It is the second feature-length collaboration between C.W. Winter and Anders Edström after their 2009 film, The Anchorage.

== Plot ==
The film, which takes its title from Hesiod's Ancient Greek farmer's almanac Works and Days, is presented in five chapters as it examines the daily routine of Tayoko, an elderly woman and farmer who lives in Shiotani. The film follows Tayoko as she cares for and prepares to mourn her husband, Junji, and features excerpts read from Tayoko's real-life diaries.

== Cast ==
- Tayoko Shiojiri as Tayoko
- Hiroharu Shikata as Hiroharu
- Ryo Kase as Ryo Sasaki
- Mai Edström as Mai
- Kaoru Iwahana as Junji
- Jun Tsunoda as Kagawa
- Masahiro Motoki as NPC

== Production ==
The film was inspired by a series of conversations between Winter, Edström, and Tayoko, who is Edström's real life mother-in-law. It was shot for a total of 27 weeks across a 14-month period. At 480 minutes long, it is one of the longest films ever made.

== Release ==
The film had its world premiere at the 2020 Berlin International Film Festival. It had its U.S. theatrical release on July 16, 2021 and its French theatrical release on June 22, 2022.

== Critical response ==
The film received critical acclaim. Mark Peranson for Cinema Scope called the film "an utterly confident, magisterial effort that will stand the test of time." In La Internacional Cinéfila, Agnès Wildenstein called it, "The best movie of the year. A tremendous cinematic pleasure. And a film that will remain in the history of cinema." Jordan Cronk, writing for Artforum, described the film as a "comprehensive look at a vanishing way of life...uncommonly poignant and profound." Writing for Le Monde, Clarise Fabré called the film "a masterpiece."

== Accolades ==
The film won the Encounters Golden Bear for Best Film at the 2020 Berlin International Film Festival. It won Best Independent/Experimental Film of the Year from the Los Angeles Film Critics Association. It also won Best Film prizes at the Punto de Vista International Documentary Film Festival and Black Canvas film festivals.

It made dozens of end of the year Ten Best lists.

== See also ==
- List of longest films
