= Los Angeles Greek Film Festival =

Annual film festival held in Los Angeles, USA

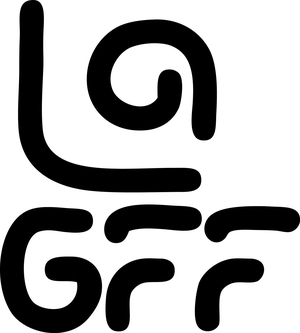
- Los Angeles Greek Film Festival Logo
- Location: Los Angeles, United States
- Founded: 2007
- Awards: Orpheus Awards
- Language: Greek
- Website: www.lagff.org

The Los Angeles Greek Film Festival (LAGFF), is a film festival held annually in Los Angeles, United States which showcases films and filmmakers from Greece, Cyprus and the rest of the world in the US. Since its inception in 2007, LAGFF has screened over 520 films and hosted and supported over 500 filmmakers. LAGFF is a 501(c)(3) organization and in 2021 it was the largest Greek Film Festival outside of Greece, with numerous films making their United States premiere in the festival.

For the 15th iteration of the festival, due to the COVID-19 pandemic LAGFF run its festival online.

== Awards ==
Films are the LAGFF are nominated for the Orpheus Awards in the following categories:

- Best Fiction Feature
- Best Performance
- Special Jury Award for Best Performance
- Best Director
- Best Feature Audience Award
- Best Short Film
- Short Film Audience Award
- Best Documentary Film
- Documentary Special Jury Award
- Documentary Audience Award
- Best Animation Film
- Animation Special Jury Award
- Animation Audience Award

== See also ==
- List of film festivals in North and Central America
- Cinema of Greece
- San Francisco Greek Film Festival
