= Antenne Books =

Distributor of independent art publishers

- Founded: 2010; 15 years ago
- Country of origin: United Kingdom
- Headquarters location: London
- Distribution: Gazelle Book Services
- Publication types: Books
- Nonfiction topics: Art, photography, design, illustration, theory, writing, fashion and culture
- Official website: www.antennebooks.com

Antenne Books is a British distributor for independent publishers and magazines. Antenne Books distributes publications on art, photography, design, illustration, theory, writing, fashion and culture.

== History ==
The company was established in London in 2010.

In the 2010s, independent publishing rapidly grew, with many emerging publishers utilising new technologies and the ability to produce books on small scales and at low costs. Antenne Books was realised as a distribution platform against this background, initiated to support the large growth of these emerging publishers, who at the time had limited means to distribute their work using traditional models of book distribution. Antenne Books began by working with publishers Aki Books, Hassla, Nieves, Seems and The Institute of Social Hypocrisy, introducing retailers to publications that had, until then, rarely been available in Europe.

Antenne Books now represents publishers from the UK, Europe, USA and Japan and distributes to a wide selection of bookshops and specialist retailers worldwide.
