= My Favorite War =

2020 aninmated film by Ilze Burkovska Jacobsen

- Norwegian: Mans mīļākais karš
- Directed by: Ilze Burkovska Jacobsen
- Written by: Ilze Burkovska Jacobsen
- Production companies: Bivrost Film; Ego Media
- Distributed by: Destiny Distribution
- Release date: 2020
- Countries: Norway; Latvia
- Language: 80 minutes

My Favorite War (Latvian: Mans mīļākais karš) is a 2020 Latvian-Norwegian animated documentary, directed and written by Ilze Burkovska-Jacobsen.

== Summary ==
The film tells the story of the director's personal experience of growing up in Soviet Latvia from 1970 to 1990.

== Production ==
The film was co-produced by Ego Media in Latvia and Bivrost Film in Norway. The idea of the making of the film was inspired by Marjane Satrapi's Persepolis and Ari Folman's Waltz with Bashir. Due to a limited budget, the director decided to combine animation with live-action and archival footage and photos. The development of the film started in 2014, and production began late in 2016.

== Accolades ==
The film won the Contrechamp program at the Annecy Festival in France.

== Release ==
The film was released in Latvia on 25 September 2020.
