= Georgis Grigorakis =

Greek film director and screenwriter

- Born: 20 May 1983 (age 43); Athens, Greece
- Occupations: Filmmaker; Screenwriter
- Years active: 2007–present

Georgis Grigorakis (Greek: Τζώρτζης Γρηγοράκης; born 20 May 1983) is a Greek film director and screenwriter. He has received awards at the 70th Berlin Film Festival and the Hellenic Film Academy Awards 2021 for his debut film Digger.

== Career ==
Georgis was born and raised in Athens. He studied psychology in the UK and did a master's degree in film direction (fiction) at the National Film and Television School in Beaconsfield, UK.

He first started making short films in 2007 and his debut feature film, Digger, was premiered at the 70th Berlin Film Festival Panorama programme, winning the CICAE Art Cinema Award.

== Filmography ==
=== Film ===
Year	Title	Director	Writer	Producer	Distribution
2020	Digger	Yes	Yes	No	The Matchbox Factory and JHR Films

=== Short film ===
Year	Title	Director	Writer	Producer	Notes
2007	Vicious Circle	Yes	Yes	Yes	
2009	'N me for myself	Yes	Yes	Yes	8 nominations, 6 awards
2010	Reverse	Yes	Yes	Yes	4 nominations, 2 awards
2011	The Case of Regina Scalici	Yes	No	No	
2011	From Nowhere	Yes	Yes	No	
2012	Revolving	Yes	Yes	No	4 nominations, 2 awards
2013	45 Degrees	Yes	Yes	Yes	9 nominations, 2 awards

=== Videos ===
Year	Title	Director	Writer	Producer	Notes
2012	Xaxakes	Yes	Yes	No	Music video for a punk band
2012	Now What	Yes	Yes	No	A dance video
2012	Celtman	Yes	Yes	Yes	A documentary about the extreme triathlon Celtman! in Scotland; 4 nominations
2013	Unplugged	Yes	Yes	No	Promo video for Zermatt Unplugged festival in Switzerland; 2 nominations
2016	C	Yes	Yes	No	Video for the Goulandris Museum of Cycladic Art, produced by HAOS film

== Awards and nominations ==
Grigorakis' films have been nominated more than 50 times and won more than 30 awards.

His debut feature film Digger won 19 awards, including 10 awards at the Hellenic Film Academy Awards 2021.
