= All Hands on Deck (2020 film) =

2020 film

- Film poster
- Directed by: Guillaume Brac
- Written by: Guillaume Brac; Catherine Paillé
- Produced by: Grégoire Debailly
- Starring: Salif Cissé
- Cinematography: Alan Guichaoua
- Edited by: Héloïse Pelloquet
- Release date: 25 February 2020 (Berlin)
- Running time: 95 minutes
- Country: France
- Language: French

All Hands on Deck (French: À L'abordage) is a 2020 French comedy film directed by Guillaume Brac. It was selected to be shown in the Panorama section at the 70th Berlin International Film Festival.

== Cast ==
- Eric Nantchouang as Félix
- Salif Cissé as Chérif
- Asma Messaoudene as Alma
- Soundos Mosbah
- Benjamin Natchouang
