= Guillaume Brac =

French film director

- Born: 1977 (age 47–48); Paris, France
- Occupation: Film director

Guillaume Brac (born 1977) is a French film director from Paris. He has directed films such as Tonnerre, July Tales, Treasure Island, and À L'abordage.

== Early life ==
Guillaume Brac was born in 1977 in Paris, France. He graduated from La Fémis in 2005.

== Career ==
Guillaume Brac's 2011 film, Un monde sans femmes, was nominated for the César Award for Best Short Film at the 37th César Awards. His debut feature film, Tonnerre, had its world premiere at the 2013 Locarno Festival. It stars Vincent Macaigne, Solène Rigot, and Bernard Ménez. It was nominated for the 2014 Louis Delluc Prize for Best Directorial Debut.

He served as one of the jury members in the Caméra D'or section at the 2017 Cannes Film Festival. His second feature film, July Tales, had its world premiere at the 2017 Locarno Festival. After that, he directed a documentary film, Treasure Island, which had its world premiere at the 2018 Karlovy Vary International Film Festival. In 2020, he returned with a fiction film, À L'abordage, which had its world premiere at the 67th Berlin International Film Festival. It won a special mention from the FIPRESCI jury.

== Filmography ==
=== Feature films ===
- Tonnerre (2013)
- July Tales (2017)
- Treasure Island (2018)
- À L'abordage (2020)

=== Short films ===
- Le Naufragé (2009)
- Un monde sans femmes (2011)
- Le Repos des braves (2016)
