= 2017 Toronto International Film Festival =

Annual Canadian film festival

- Festival poster
- Opening film: Borg McEnroe by Janus Metz Pedersen
- Closing film: C'est la vie! by Éric Toledano and Olivier Nakache
- Location: Toronto, Canada
- Founded: 1976
- Awards: Three Billboards Outside Ebbing, Missouri (People's Choice Award)
- Festival date: September 7 – 17, 2017
- Website: www.tiff.net/tiff/

TIFF chronology
- 2018 2016

The 42nd annual Toronto International Film Festival was held from September 7 to 17, 2017. There were fourteen programs, with the Vanguard and City to City programs both being retired from previous years, with the total number of films down by 20% from the 2016 edition. Borg/McEnroe directed by Janus Metz Pedersen opened the festival.

According to a "fact sheet" released by the Festival before it began, this edition included 255 feature-length films and 84 short films. Of the feature films, 147 are claimed to be world premieres.

The number of Canadian films at the festival (including co-productions) was listed as 28 features and 29 shorts. Christopher Nolan's Dunkirk received a special IMAX 70mm screening at the Cinesphere as part of the main film slate and the 50th anniversary of IMAX, making it the first Nolan film to appear at the festival since Following, nineteen years earlier.

== Awards ==
The festival's final awards were announced on September 17.

Award	Film	Director
People's Choice Award	Three Billboards Outside Ebbing, Missouri	Martin McDonagh
People's Choice Award First Runner Up	I, Tonya	Craig Gillespie
People's Choice Award Second Runner Up	Call Me by Your Name	Luca Guadagnino
People's Choice Award: Documentary	Faces Places	Agnès Varda and JR
People's Choice Award, Documentary First Runner Up	Long Time Running	Jennifer Baichwal and Nicholas de Pencier
People's Choice Award, Documentary Second Runner Up	Super Size Me 2: Holy Chicken!	Morgan Spurlock
People's Choice Award: Midnight Madness	Bodied	Joseph Kahn
People's Choice Award, Midnight Madness First Runner Up	The Disaster Artist	James Franco
People's Choice Award, Midnight Madness Second Runner Up	Brawl in Cell Block 99	S. Craig Zahler
Platform Prize	Sweet Country	Warwick Thornton
Platform Prize, Honourable Mention	Dark River	Clio Barnard
Best Canadian Feature Film	Ravenous (Les Affamés)	Robin Aubert
Best Canadian Feature Film, Honourable Mention	The Little Girl Who Was Too Fond of Matches (La petite fille qui aimait trop les allumettes)	Simon Lavoie
Best Canadian Short Film	Pre-Drink	Marc-Antoine Lemire
Best Canadian Short Film, Honourable Mention	The Tesla World Light	Matthew Rankin
Best Canadian First Feature Film	Luk'Luk'I	Wayne Wapeemukwa
Best Canadian First Feature Film, Honourable Mention	Ava	Sadaf Foroughi
FIPRESCI Discovery Prize	Ava	Sadaf Foroughi
FIPRESCI Special Presentations	The Motive	Manuel Martín Cuenca
Best International Short Film	The Burden	Niki Lindroth von Bahr
Best International Short Film, Honourable Mention	A Gentle Night	Qiu Yang
Netpac Award for World or International Asian Film Premiere	The Great Buddha+	Huang Hsin-Yao

== Juries ==
=== Platform Jury ===
- Chen Kaige
- Małgorzata Szumowska
- Wim Wenders

=== Canadian Feature Film Jury ===
- Ella Cooper
- Mark Adams
- Min Sook Lee

=== Short Cuts Film Jury ===
- Chloé Zhao
- Johnny Ma
- Marit van den Elshout

== Programme ==
The following films were selected:

=== Gala presentations ===
- 55 Steps by Bille August
- Borg McEnroe by Janus Metz Pedersen
- Breathe by Andy Serkis
- C'est la vie! by Éric Toledano and Olivier Nakache
- Chappaquiddick by John Curran
- Darkest Hour by Joe Wright
- Film Stars Don't Die in Liverpool by Paul McGuigan
- Hochelaga, Land of Souls by François Girard
- Kings by Deniz Gamze Ergüven
- The Leisure Seeker by Paolo Virzì
- Long Time Running by Jennifer Baichwal and Nicholas de Pencier
- Mary Shelley by Haifaa al-Mansour
- The Mountain Between Us by Hany Abu-Assad
- Mudbound by Dee Rees
- My Days of Mercy by Tali Shalom Ezer
- Stronger by David Gordon Green
- Three Christs by Jon Avnet
- The Upside by Neil Burger
- The Wife by Björn Runge
- Woman Walks Ahead by Susanna White

=== Special presentations ===
- BPM (Beats per Minute) by Robin Campillo
- A Fantastic Woman by Sebastián Lelio
- A Season in France by Mahamat Saleh Haroun
- Battle of the Sexes by Jonathan Dayton and Valerie Faris
- The Brawler by Anurag Kashyap
- The Breadwinner by Nora Twomey
- Call Me by Your Name by Luca Guadagnino
- The Captain by Robert Schwentke
- Catch the Wind by Gaël Morel
- The Children Act by Richard Eyre
- The Conformist by Cai Shangjun
- The Cured by David Freyne
- The Current War by Alfonso Gomez-Rejon
- Disobedience by Sebastián Lelio
- Downsizing by Alexander Payne
- Dunkirk by Christopher Nolan
- The Escape by Dominic Savage
- Eye on Juliet by Kim Nguyen
- First They Killed My Father by Angelina Jolie
- The Florida Project by Sean Baker
- Foxtrot by Samuel Maoz
- The Guardians by Xavier Beauvois
- Hostiles by Scott Cooper
- The Hungry by Bornila Chatterjee
- I Love You, Daddy by Louis C.K.
- In the Fade by Fatih Akin
- I, Tonya by Craig Gillespie
- Journey's End by Saul Dibb
- The Killing of a Sacred Deer by Yorgos Lanthimos
- Kodachrome by Mark Raso
- Lady Bird by Greta Gerwig
- Lean on Pete by Andrew Haigh
- Loving Pablo by Fernando León de Aranoa
- Manhunt by John Woo
- Mark Felt: The Man Who Brought Down the White House by Peter Landesman
- Marrowbone by Sergio G. Sánchez
- Making of Michael Jackson's Thriller by Jerry Kramer
- Mektoub, My Love: Canto Uno by Abdellatif Kechiche
- Michael Jackson's Thriller 3D by John Landis
- Molly's Game by Aaron Sorkin
- Mother! by Darren Aronofsky
- The Motive by Manuel Martín Cuenca
- Novitiate by Maggie Betts
- Number One by Tonie Marshall
- Omerta by Hansal Mehta
- On Chesil Beach by Dominic Cooke
- Outside In by Lynn Shelton
- Papillon by Michael Noer
- Plonger by Mélanie Laurent
- The Price of Success by Teddy Lussi-Modeste
- Professor Marston and the Wonder Women by Angela Robinson
- Racer and the Jailbird by Michaël R. Roskam
- Radiance by Naomi Kawase
- Redoubtable by Michel Hazanavicius
- The Rider by Chloé Zhao
- Roman J. Israel, Esq. by Dan Gilroy
- The Shape of Water by Guillermo del Toro
- Sheikh Jackson by Amr Salama
- The Square by Ruben Östlund
- Submergence by Wim Wenders
- Suburbicon by George Clooney
- Thelma by Joachim Trier
- Three Billboards Outside Ebbing, Missouri by Martin McDonagh
- Three Peaks by Jan Zabeil
- Unicorn Store by Brie Larson
- Victoria & Abdul by Stephen Frears
- Who We Are Now by Matthew Newton
- You Disappear by Peter Schønau Fog
- Youth by Feng Xiaogang

=== Midnight Madness ===
- Bodied by Joseph Kahn
- Brawl in Cell Block 99 by S. Craig Zahler
- The Crescent by Seth A. Smith
- The Disaster Artist by James Franco
- Downrange by Ryuhei Kitamura
- Great Choice by Robin Comisar
- Let the Corpses Tan by Hélène Cattet and Bruno Forzani
- Mom and Dad by Brian Taylor
- Revenge by Coralie Fargeat
- The Ritual by David Bruckner
- Vampire Clay by Sôichi Umezawa

=== Masters ===
- The Day After by Hong Sang-soo
- Faces Places by Agnès Varda and JR
- First Reformed by Paul Schrader
- Happy End by Michael Haneke
- The House by the Sea by Robert Guédiguian
- Loveless by Andrey Zvyagintsev
- The Other Side of Hope by Aki Kaurismäki
- Our People Will Be Healed by Alanis Obomsawin
- Rainbow: A Private Affair by Paolo and Vittorio Taviani
- The Third Murder by Hirokazu Kore-eda
- Zama by Lucrecia Martel

=== Documentaries ===
- Azmaish: A Journey through the Subcontinent by Sabiha Sumar
- Boom for Real: The Late Teenage Years of Jean-Michel Basquiat by Sara Driver
- The Carter Effect by Sean Menard
- The China Hustle by Jed Rothstein
- Cocaine Prison by Violeta Ayala
- Eric Clapton: Life in 12 Bars by Lili Fini Zanuck
- Ex Libris: The New York Public Library by Frederick Wiseman
- The Final Year by Greg Barker
- The Gospel According to André by Kate Novack
- Grace Jones: Bloodlight and Bami by Sophie Fiennes
- Jim & Andy: the Great Beyond – the story of Jim Carrey & Andy Kaufman featuring a very special, contractually obligated mention of Tony Clifton by Chris Smith
- Jane by Brett Morgen
- The Judge by Erika Cohn
- The Legend of the Ugly King by Hüseyin Tabak
- Living Proof by Matt Embry
- Lots of Kids, a Monkey and a Castle by Gustavo Salmerón
- Love Means Zero by Jason Kohn
- The Other Side of Everything by Mila Turajlić
- Sammy Davis, Jr.: I've Gotta Be Me by Sam Pollard
- Scotty and the Secret History of Hollywood by Matt Tyrnauer
- Silas by Hawa Essuman and Anjali Nayar
- Super Size Me 2: Holy Chicken! by Morgan Spurlock
- There Is a House Here by Alan Zweig

=== Contemporary World Cinema ===
- Alanis by Anahí Berneri
- Ana, mon amour by Călin Peter Netzer
- Angels Wear White by Vivian Qu
- April's Daughter by Michel Franco
- Arrhythmia by Boris Khlebnikov
- Beyond Words by Urszula Antoniak
- The Big Bad Fox and Other Tales... by Benjamin Renner, Patrick Imbert
- Birds Without Names by Kazuya Shiraishi
- Black Kite by Tarique Qayumi
- Breath by Simon Baker
- A Ciambra by Jonas Carpignano
- Dark is the Night by Adolfo Alix Jr.
- Directions by Stephan Komandarev
- Disappearance by Boudewijn Koole
- Don't Talk to Irene by Pat Mills
- Euthanizer by Teemu Nikki
- Félicité by Alain Gomis
- Good Favour by Rebecca Daly
- Hannah by Andrea Pallaoro
- The Insult by Ziad Doueiri
- Insyriated by Philippe Van Leeuw
- The Journey by Mohamed Al-Daradji
- Life and Nothing More by Antonio Méndez Esparza
- The Little Girl Who Was Too Fond of Matches by Simon Lavoie
- The Lodgers by Brian O'Malley
- Longing by Savi Gabizon
- Looking for Oum Kulthum by Shirin Neshat
- Marlina the Murderer in Four Acts by Mouly Surya
- Meditation Park by Mina Shum
- Miami by Zaida Bergroth
- Motorrad by Vicente Amorim
- Nina by Juraj Lehotský
- The Number by Khalo Matabane
- On Body and Soul by Ildikó Enyedi
- Porcupine Lake by Ingrid Veninger
- Public Schooled by Kyle Rideout
- Pyewacket by Adam MacDonald
- Ravenous (Les Affamés) by Robin Aubert
- The Royal Hibiscus Hotel by Ishaya Bako
- Samui Song by Pen-Ek Ratanaruang
- Sergio & Sergei by Ernesto Daranas Serrano
- A Sort of Family by Diego Lerman
- The Summit by Santiago Mitre
- Tulipani, Love, Honour and a Bicycle by Mike van Diem
- Under the Tree by Hafsteinn Gunnar Sigurðsson
- Verónica by Paco Plaza
- Wajib by Annemarie Jacir
- Western by Valeska Grisebach

=== Discovery ===
- 1% by Stephen McCallum
- 3/4 by Ilian Metev
- Ava by Sadaf Foroughi
- All You Can Eat Buddha by Ian Lagarde
- Apostasy by Daniel Kokotajlo
- Black Cop by Cory Bowles
- The Butterfly Tree by Priscilla Cameron
- Cardinals by Grayson Moore and Aidan Shipley
- Disappearance by Ali Asgari
- A Fish Out of Water by Lai Kuo-An
- Five Fingers for Marseilles by Michael Matthews
- The Future Ahead by Constanza Novick
- The Garden by Sonja Kröner
- The Great Buddha+ by Huang Hsin-Yao
- Gutland by Govinda Van Maele
- High Fantasy by Jenna Bass
- Human Traces by Nick Gorman
- I Kill Giants by Anders Walter
- I Am Not a Witch by Rungano Nyoni
- Indian Horse by Stephen Campanelli
- Killing Jesus by Laura Mora
- Kissing Candice by Aoife McArdle
- Luk'Luk'I by Wayne Wapeemukwa
- Mary Goes Round by Molly McGlynn
- Messi and Maud by Marleen Jonkman
- Miracle by Egle Vertelyte
- Montana by Limor Shmila
- Never Steady, Never Still by Kathleen Hepburn
- Oblivion Verses by Alireza Khatami
- Oh Lucy! by Atsuko Hirayanagi
- The Poet and the Boy by Kim Yang-hee
- Princesita by Marialy Rivas
- Ravens by Jens Assur
- Scaffolding by Matan Yair
- Shuttle Life by Tan Seng Kiat
- Simulation by Abed Abest
- Soldiers. Story from Ferentari by Ivana Mladenovic
- Suleiman Mountain by Elizaveta Stishova
- The Swan by Ása Helga Hjörleifsdóttir
- Tigre by Silvina Schnicer and Ulises Porra Guardiola
- Valley of Shadows by Jonas Matzow Gulbrandsen
- Village Rockstars by Rima Das
- Waru by Briar Grace-Smith, Ainsley Gardiner, Renae Maihi, Casey Kaa, Awanui Simich-Pene, Chelsea Cohen, Katie Wolfe and Paula Jones
- Winter Brothers by Hlynur Pálmason
- A Worthy Companion by Carlos Sanchez and Jason Sanchez

=== Platform ===
- Beast by Michael Pearce
- Brad's Status by Mike White
- Custody by Xavier Legrand
- Dark River by Clio Barnard
- The Death of Stalin by Armando Iannucci
- Euphoria by Lisa Langseth
- If You Saw His Heart (Si tu voyais son cœur) by Joan Chemla
- Mademoiselle Paradis (Licht) by Barbara Albert
- Razzia by Nabil Ayouch
- The Seen and Unseen by Kamila Andini
- Sweet Country by Warwick Thornton
- What Will People Say (Hva Vil Volk Si) by Iram Haq

=== Short Cuts ===
- The Argument (with annotations) by Daniel Cockburn
- Bickford Park by Dane Clark and Linsey Stewart
- Bird by Molly Parker
- Charles by Dominic Étienne Simard
- Creatura Dada by Caroline Monnet
- Crème de menthe by Philippe David Gagné and Jean-Marc E. Roy
- The Crying Conch by Vincent Toi
- The Drop In by Naledi Jackson
- For Nonna Anna by Luis De Filippis
- Grandmother by Trevor Mack
- homer_b by Milos Mitrovic and Connor Sweeney
- An Imagined Conversation: Kanye West & Stephen Hawking by Sol Friedman
- Latched by Justin Harding and Rob Brunner
- Lira's Forest by Connor Jessup
- Midnight Confession by Maxwell McCabe-Lokos
- Milk by Heather Young
- Möbius by Sam Kuhn
- Nuuca by Michelle Latimer
- Pre-Drink by Marc-Antoine Lemire
- Rupture by Yassmina Karajah
- Shadow Nettes by Phillip Barker
- Signature by Kei Chikaura
- Stay, I Don't Want to Be Alone by Gabriel Savignac
- The Tesla World Light by Matthew Rankin
- Threads by Torill Kove
- We Forgot to Break Up by Chandler Levack

=== Primetime ===
- Alias Grace by Mary Harron
- Dark by Baran bo Odar
- The Deuce by Michelle MacLaren and Ernest Dickerson
- The Girlfriend Experience by Amy Seimetz and Lodge Kerrigan
- Under Pressure by Andrucha Waddington and Mini Kerti

=== Cinematheque ===
- I've Heard the Mermaids Singing by Patricia Rozema
- North of Superior by Graeme Ferguson
- Picture of Light by Peter Mettler
- Rude by Clement Virgo

=== Wavelengths ===
- Beyond the One by Anna Marziano
- Caniba by Veréna Paravel and Lucien Castaing-Taylor
- Cocote by Nelson Carlo de Los Santos Arias
- Dragonfly Eyes by Xu Bing
- Le fort des fous by Narimane Nari
- Good Luck by Ben Russell
- Heart of a Mountain by Parastoo Anoushahpour, Ryan Ferko and Faraz Anoushahpour
- Jeannette: The Childhood of Joan of Arc by Bruno Dumont
- Mrs. Fang by Wang Bing
- The Nothing Factory by Pedro Pinho
- Occidental by Neil Beloufa
- Palmerston Blvd. by Dan Browne
- Prototype by Blake Williams
- Scaffold by Kazik Radwanski
- A Skin So Soft (Ta peau si lisse) by Denis Côté
- Some Cities by Francesco Gagliardi
- Turtles Are Always Home by Rawane Nassif
- (100ft) by Minjung Kim

== Canada's Top Ten ==
In December, TIFF programmers released their annual Canada's Top Ten list of the films selected as the ten best Canadian films of 2017. The selected films received a follow-up screening at the TIFF Bell Lightbox as a "Canada's Top Ten" minifestival in January 2018, where Unarmed Verses won the People's Choice Award.

=== Features ===
- Adventures in Public School by Kyle Rideout
- Allure by Carlos Sanchez and Jason Sanchez
- Ava by Sadaf Foroughi
- The Little Girl Who Was Too Fond of Matches (La petite fille qui aimait trop les allumettes) by Simon Lavoie
- Luk'Luk'I by Wayne Wapeemukwa
- Never Steady, Never Still by Kathleen Hepburn
- Our People Will Be Healed by Alanis Obomsawin
- Ravenous (Les Affamés) by Robin Aubert
- Rumble: The Indians Who Rocked the World by Alfonso Maiorana and Catherine Bainbridge
- Unarmed Verses by Charles Officer

=== Short films ===
- The Argument (with annotations) by Daniel Cockburn
- The Botanist by Maude Plante-Husaruk and Maxime Lacoste-Lebuis
- The Crying Conch by Vincent Toi
- The Drop In by Naledi Jackson
- Flood by Amanda Strong
- Milk by Heather Young
- Pre-Drink by Marc-Antoine Lemire
- Rupture by Yassmina Karajah
- The Tesla World Light by Matthew Rankin
- Threads by Torill Kove
