= Oh Lucy! =

Oh Lucy! May refer to:

- Oh Lucy! (2014 film), a short film
- Oh Lucy! (2017 film), based on the 2014 film
