= Hirayanagi =

Hirayanagi (written: 平栁) is a Japanese surname. Notable people with the surname include:

- Atsuko Hirayanagi (平栁 敦子), Japanese-American filmmaker
- Genba Hirayanagi (平柳 玄藩, born 1980), Japanese professional wrestler
