= The Tesla World Light =

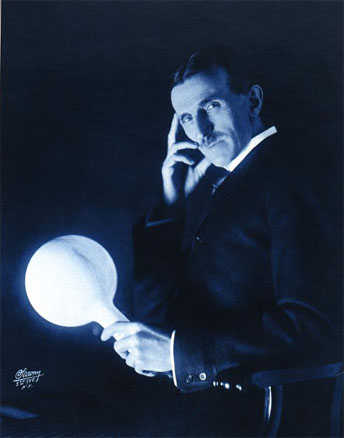
- Directed by: Matthew Rankin
- Produced by: Julie Roy
- Starring: Robert Vilar
- Cinematography: Julien Fontaine
- Edited by: Matthew Rankin
- Music by: Christophe Lamarche-Ledoux
- Production company: National Film Board of Canada
- Release date: May 23, 2017 (Cannes Film Festival)
- Running time: 8 minutes
- Country: Canada

The Tesla World Light (French: Tesla : lumière mondiale) is an 8-minute 2017 black and white avant-garde film by Montreal director Matthew Rankin imagining the latter days of inventor Nikola Tesla in 1905 in New York City. Rankin has stated that he was interested in exploring Tesla's optimistic utopian vision. The film is a fanciful amalgamation of elements from Tesla's life including his 1905 pleadings for J.P. Morgan to continue funding his World Wireless System and his love for a pigeon. Rankin has stated that "everything in the film is drawn from something [Tesla] wrote or said." The film uses excerpts of Tesla's actual letters to Morgan, which the filmmaker found in the Library of Congress; even a reference to Tesla falling in love with an "electric pigeon" was based on an interview with Tesla, according to Rankin. The film is produced by Julie Roy for the National Film Board of Canada.

== Technique ==
To make the film, Rankin combines pixilation with a technique called "light animation," which involves moving a light source in the frame to produce light rays—a technique that he felt suited Tesla and his own experiments with electrical currents. Rankin estimates he used as many as 15,000 sparklers to produce such effects, along with fluorescent lamps, flashlights and LEDs. A shot of Tesla reading in front of his Tesla coil was made with an illuminated windmill, which was spun to create vivid rings of light.

Rankin's avant-garde approach was influenced by what he read in Tesla's autobiography, where the inventor reported seeing abstract shapes of light when feeling strong emotions. This led to Rankin to believe Tesla may have been prone to synesthesia and inspired the filmmaker to adopt a visual music approach, drawing on visual references from such artists as Hans Richter, Viking Eggeling, Walter Ruttmann and Oskar Fischinger.

He worked with sound artist Sacha A. Ratcliffe, who recreated a device of Tesla's known as a Tesla Spirit Radio. "It is a very strange device that can receive and transmit the sound of light waves. The effect is totally fascinating. The intensities and textures of the sound vary according to the light vibrations, and Sacha created much of the background sound in the film with this bizarre machine. So it's a film that's completely composed of light, from the images to the soundtrack," Rankin said.

== Release ==
The Tesla World Light had its world premiere in official competition on May 23 at the 2017 Cannes Film Festival, as part of the Critics' Week. The film has also been selected to the Annecy International Animated Film Festival.

At the 2017 Toronto International Film Festival, the film received an honourable mention in the Best Canadian Short Film category. In December, TIFF named the film to its annual Canada's Top Ten list of the ten best Canadian short films.

The film won the Canadian Screen Award for Best Animated Short Film at the 6th Canadian Screen Awards. It was submitted to the 2018 Academy Awards for the Academy Award for Best Animated Short Film, but was not selected as a finalist.
