= Antonio Méndez Esparza =

Spanish filmmaker (born 1976)

- Born: January 7, 1976 (age 50); Madrid, Spain
- Years active: 2006–present

Antonio Méndez Esparza (Spanish: [anˈtonjo ˈmendeθ esˈpaɾθa]; born 7 January 1976) is a Spanish filmmaker based in the United States. He teaches at the Florida State University College of Motion Picture Arts.

== Life and career ==
Méndez Esparza was born in Madrid, where he obtained a law degree. He studied filmmaking at the University of California, Los Angeles, and at Columbia University, where he received an MFA.

His 2009 short film Time and Again (Una y otra vez) won the narrative short prize at the Los Angeles Film Festival and earned him a Latino filmmaker prize at the Directors Guild of America's Student Film Awards. His first feature, Aquí y allá, premiered in the Critics' Week at the 2012 Cannes Film Festival and won the section's Grand Prize. The film also received a special mention at the 2012 AFI Fest and earned him a nomination for the Gotham Award for Breakthrough Director. Both films depict experiences of Mexican migrants to the United States with non-professional actors.

His second feature, Life and Nothing More, premiered at the 2017 Toronto International Film Festival and won the John Cassavetes Award at the Independent Spirit Awards. Shot in Tallahassee with a small crew and non-professional actors, the film depicts a struggling African-American family in Florida.

His third feature and first documentary, Courtroom 3H, premiered in competition at the 2020 San Sebastián International Film Festival. The film documents proceedings in a Tallahassee family court presided by a judge with whom Méndez Esparza became acquainted while making Life and Nothing More.

In 2022, he directed the comedy thriller Something Is About to Happen, which he co-wrote with Clara Roquet based on the novel Que nadie duerma by Juan José Millás, in Spain.

== Filmography ==
Year	Title	Note
2006	Yanira	Short
2009	Una y otra vez (Time and Again)	Short
2012	Aquí y allá (Here and There)	
2017	Life and Nothing More	
2019	Courtroom 3H	Documentary
2023	Que nadie duerma (Something Is About to Happen)	
