= Chemla =

Chemla is a surname. Notable people with the surname include:

- Joan Chemla (born 1984), French film director
- Judith Chemla (born 1984), French actress
- Karine Chemla (born 1957), French historian of mathematics and sinologist
- Paul Chemla (born 1944), French bridge player
- Lucette Valensi (born 1936), born Chemla
