= If You Saw His Heart =

- Si tu voyais son cœur
- Directed by: Joan Chemla
- Written by: Joan Chemla; Santiago Amigorena
- Based on: Boarding House by Guillermo Rosales
- Produced by: Pierre Guyard
- Starring: Gael García Bernal; Nahuel Pérez Biscayart; Marine Vacth
- Cinematography: André Chemetoff
- Edited by: Béatrice Herminie
- Music by: Gabriel Yared
- Production company: Nord-Ouest Films
- Distributed by: Diaphana Films
- Release date: September 10, 2017 (TIFF)
- Running time: 86 minutes
- Country: France
- Language: French

If You Saw His Heart (French: Si tu voyais son cœur) is a French drama film, directed by Joan Chemla and released in 2017. Based partially on Guillermo Rosales's novel Boarding House, the film stars Gael García Bernal as Daniel, a Roma thief haunted by guilt over the accidental death of his friend Costel (Nahuel Pérez Biscayart).

The film premiered at the 2017 Toronto International Film Festival, in the Platform stream.
