= Aquí y allá =

- Theatrical release poster
- Directed by: Antonio Méndez Esparza
- Written by: Antonio Méndez Esparza
- Produced by: Tim Hobbs; Ori Dov Gratch; Pedro Hernández Santos
- Starring: Pedro De los Santos; Teresa Ramírez Aguirre; Lorena Pantaleón Vázquez; Heidi Solano Espinoza; Néstor Tepetate Medina; Carolina Prado Ángel; Copa Kings
- Cinematography: Barbu Balasoiu
- Edited by: Fillipo Conz
- Music by: Copa Kings
- Production companies: Torch Films; Aquí y Allí Films
- Distributed by: Torch Films (US); Acontracorriente Films (ES); ASC Distribution (FR)
- Release dates: May 22, 2012 (Cannes); December 21, 2012 (United States); January 18, 2013 (Spain)
- Running time: 110 minutes
- Countries: United States; Spain; Mexico
- Language: Spanish

Aquí y allá (English: Here and There) is a 2012 drama film written and directed by Antonio Méndez Esparza. The film follows a Mexican immigrant who returns to his home in a small mountain village in Guerrero, Mexico after years of working in the US. He struggles to rebuild his family and pursue his dream of starting a band called the Copa Kings. The film won the Critics' Week Grand Prize at the Cannes Film Festival.

== Plot ==
Pedro returns to the village of Copanatoyac, the "(Aquí) or Here" of the title, in the Sierra mountains of Guerrero, Mexico. After working in New York for a few years to support his family, he finds his daughters on the verge of adolescence and is unsure of what to expect. The younger of the two, Heidi, is eager to reconnect, while his older daughter, Lorena, is more distant than he imagined. His wife, Teresa, still has the same smile, though she senses he may have had a relationship in the US and is guarded in their intimate moments. Having saved his earnings, Pedro hopes to make a better life at home with his family, without having to leave them again. He plans to pursue his own version of the American Dream by starting a band, the Copa Kings. Only music seems able to diffuse Lorena's resentment toward her father's years of absence.

The villagers anticipate a bountiful crop this year, and there is also work in the growing city of Tlapa an hour away. But the locals are aware of a life of insecurity, and often think of family members or opportunities far away, north of the border. While working, Pedro meets and begins to mentor a teenager, Leo, who dreams of the US. Leo's love of breakdancing helps him win over Karla, a studious girl and a folk dancer performer. Their budding love recalls Pedro's and Teresa's relationship.

Whether consoling the grieving mother of a friend who died inexplicably "over there," or meeting a new nephew being raised by extended family because his parents have emigrated to the US, Pedro feels that "there"—the "(Allá) or There" of the title—is always present.

Teresa soon becomes pregnant with a third child, but complications force Pedro to deal with medical issues and their expense. He also begins to play local concerts and dances with the Copa Kings, singing in his song "Quiero Brindar", "I wanna drink to all I've got and to all I've accomplished."

Earning a living as a band leader and musician proves difficult. Work in the fields depends on a good harvest, and construction work seems determined by economic forces outside of their control. Pedro may be forced to confront the paradox that, "in order to feed their love ones, emigrants have to leave them behind."

== Critical reception ==
Upon the film's premiere at the Cannes Film Festival, the American trade reviews were mostly positive. Johnathan Holland of Variety wrote that the film is a "quietly devastating exploration" of its subject and that "the script is beautifully observant of the stresses immigration places on family and self." However, Neil Young of The Hollywood Reporter wrote that the film "surprisingly says little about the hot-button subjects it ambitiously sets out to explore.". Ryan Lattanzio of Indiewire wrote that "In the vein of Ozu or even Apichatpong Weerasethakul, the film is composed of sublime fragments of life passing by" and concluded, "Peaceful, almost biblical and completely absorbing, this film is a masterpiece."

French critics were overwhelmingly positive. Jacques Mandelbaum of Le Monde wrote that the film is "a remarkable first feature" by the director, and that "the deep love that binds this man and wife, the tricks the father uses to regain the look of his daughters, adolescents who are discreet and facetious in sweetly paying him the suffering of his remoteness, is all rendered with a delicacy and almost miraculous simplicity.". Comparing the film to other Mexican cinema, Bruno Icher of Liberation writes that the film is "a new proposal, delicate and charming in a register intimate and almost quasi-documentary." Telerama noted the film's "humanistic approach, modest and sensitive to the North-South disequilibrium." Film journal Positif noted that the film's "attention to mise en scene makes the most quotidian situations touching.

== Awards ==
2012

- Won - Grand Prize, Critics' Week, Cannes Film Festival
- Nominated - Best Breakthrough Director, Gotham Independent Film Awards
- Won - Best Film (Louve d'Or), Montréal Festival of New Cinema
- Won - Best Director, Thessaloniki International Film Festival
- Won - Best Film, Mumbai Film Festival
- Won - Best Director, Mumbai Film Festival
- Won - Best Film, Lone Star Film Festival
- Won - Jury Special Mention, New Auteurs, AFI FEST
- Won - In Spirit for Freedom Award, Jerusalem Film Festival
- Opening Film, Best of Morelia International Film Festival

The film also participated in the Moscow Film Festival in 2012 (translator Andrey Efremov).
