= 2012 Cannes Film Festival =

65th Cannes Film Festival
- An Official poster of the 65th Cannes Film Festival featuring a photo of American actress Marilyn Monroe
- Opening film: Moonrise Kingdom
- Closing film: Thérèse Desqueyroux
- Location: Cannes, France
- Founded: 1946
- Awards: Palme d'Or: Amour
- Hosted by: Bérénice Bejo
- No. of films: 22 (In Competition)
- Festival date: 16th – 27th of May 2012
- Website: www.festival-cannes.com

Cannes Film Festival
- 2013 2011

The 65th Cannes Film Festival took place from 16 to 27 May 2012. Italian filmmaker Nanni Moretti was the president of the jury for the main competition. Austrian filmmaker Michael Haneke won the Palme d'Or, the festival's top prize, for the drama film Amour.

The official poster of the festival features Marilyn Monroe, to mark the 50th anniversary of her death. French actress Bérénice Bejo hosted the opening and closing ceremonies.

The festival opened with Moonrise Kingdom by Wes Anderson, and the closed with Thérèse Desqueyroux by Claude Miller.

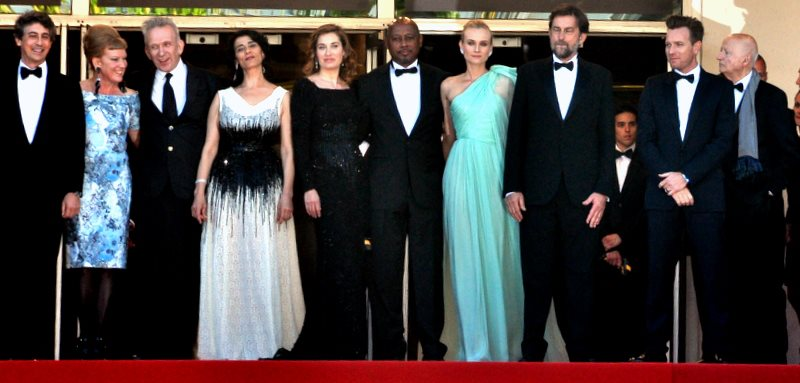
The main competition jury; from left to right: Alexander Payne, Andrea Arnold, Jean Paul Gaultier, Hiam Abbass, Emmanuelle Devos, Raoul Peck, Diane Kruger, Nanni Moretti, Ewan McGregor, and festival president Gilles Jacob

== Juries ==
=== Μain competition ===
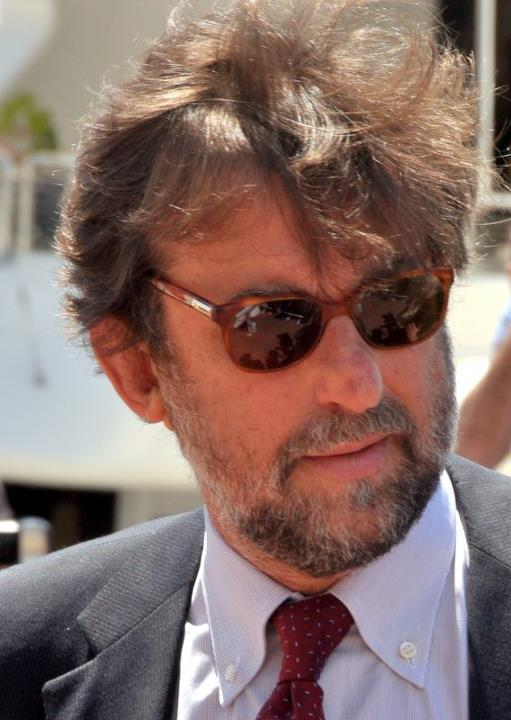
Nanni Moretti, President of the main competition jury

The following people were appointed as the Jury for the feature films of the 2012 Official Selection:

- Nanni Moretti, Italian filmmaker – Jury President
- Hiam Abbass, Palestinian actress and director
- Andrea Arnold, English filmmaker
- Emmanuelle Devos, French actress
- Jean Paul Gaultier, French fashion designer
- Diane Kruger, German actress
- Ewan McGregor, Scottish actor
- Alexander Payne, American filmmaker
- Raoul Peck, Haitian filmmaker

=== Un Certain Regard ===
- Tim Roth, British actor – Jury President
- Leïla Bekhti, French actress
- Tonie Marshall, French actress and filmmaker
- Luciano Monteagudo, Argentine film critic
- Sylvie Pras, French director of the Pompidou Centre and Festival de la Fiction at La Rochelle

=== Caméra d'Or ===
- Carlos Diegues, Brazilian filmmaker – Jury President
- Michel Andrieu, French filmmaker
- Rémy Chevrin, French cinematographer
- Francis Gavelle, French film critic
- Hervé Icovic, French art director
- Gloria Satta, Italian film journalist

=== Cinéfoundation and short films ===
- Jean-Pierre Dardenne, Belgian filmmaker – Jury President
- Karim Aïnouz, Brazilian filmmaker
- Emmanuel Carrère, French novelist and filmmaker
- Arsinée Khanjian, Canadian actress
- Yu Lik-wai, Chinese cinematographer and director

=== Independent juries ===
The following independent juries awarded films in the frame of the Critics' Week.

Nespresso Grand Prize

- Bertrand Bonello, French filmmaker – Jury President
- Francisco Ferreira, Portuguese film critic
- Akiko Kobari, Japanese film and dance critic
- Robert Koehler, American film critic
- Hanns-Georg Rodek, German film critic

France 4 Visionary Award

- Céline Sciamma, French filmmaker – Jury President
- Victor-Emmanuel Boinem, Belgian film student and blogger
- Ryan Lattanzio, American student and lead film critic at The Daily Californian
- Bikas Mishra, Indian founder and editor of DearCinema.com
- Kim Seehe, South Korean student and film critic

Nikon Discovery Award for Short Film

- João Pedro Rodrigues, Portuguese film director – Jury President
- Jakub Felcman, Czech film curator
- Marianne Khoury, Egyptian film director and producer
- Danny Lennon, Canadian film curator
- Kleber Mendonça Filho, Brazilian film director, curator, and critic

== Official Selection ==
The official selection was announced on 19 April at Grand Hôtel in Paris. Among comments after the announcement, journalists noted the unusually high number of Hollywood films in the line-up, the absence of any female director in the main competition, as well as the absence of competing first-time feature film directors. The festival's artistic leader Thierry Frémaux responded that people should not focus only on the competition films: "The selection is an ensemble; you have to consider the whole package."

=== In Competition ===
The following feature films competed for the Palme d'Or:

English Title	Original Title	Director(s)	Production Country
After the Battle	بعد الموقعة	Yousry Nasrallah	Egypt, France
The Angels' Share		Ken Loach	United Kingdom, France, Belgium, Italy
Beyond the Hills	După dealuri	Cristian Mungiu	Romania, France, Belgium
Cosmopolis		David Cronenberg	Canada, France, Italy, Portugal
Holy Motors		Leos Carax	France, Germany
The Hunt	Jagten	Thomas Vinterberg	Denmark, Sweden
In Another Country	다른 나라에서	Hong Sang-soo	South Korea
In the Fog	В тумане	Sergei Loznitsa	Belarus, Germany, Russia, Latvia, Netherlands, United States
Killing Them Softly		Andrew Dominik	United States
Lawless		John Hillcoat	United States
Like Someone in Love	ライク・サムワン・イン・ラブ	Abbas Kiarostami	France, Japan
Amour		Michael Haneke	France, Germany, Austria
Moonrise Kingdom (opening film)		Wes Anderson	United States
Mud		Jeff Nichols	United States
On the Road	Sur la route	Walter Salles	France, Brazil, United Kingdom, United States, Mexico, Canada
The Paperboy		Lee Daniels	United States
Paradise: Love	Paradies: Liebe	Ulrich Seidl	Austria, Germany, France
Post Tenebras Lux		Carlos Reygadas	Mexico, France, Germany, Netherlands
Reality		Matteo Garrone	Italy, France
Rust and Bone	De rouille et d'os	Jacques Audiard	France, Belgium
The Taste of Money	돈의 맛	Im Sang-soo	South Korea
You Ain't Seen Nothin' Yet!	Vous n'avez encore rien vu	Alain Resnais	France, Germany

(CdO) indicates film eligible for the Caméra d'Or as directorial debut feature.

=== Un Certain Regard ===
The following films were screened in the Un Certain Regard section:

English Title	Original Title	Director(s)	Production Country
11/25 The Day Mishima Chose His Own Fate	11・25自決の日 三島由紀夫と若者たち	Kōji Wakamatsu	Japan
7 Days in Havana	7 días en La Habana	Julio Médem, Laurent Cantet, Juan Carlos Tabío, Benicio del Toro, Gaspar Noé, Pablo Trapero and Elia Suleiman	Cuba, Spain, France
After Lucia	Después de Lucía	Michel Franco	Mexico
Antiviral (CdO)		Brandon Cronenberg	Canada, France
Beasts of the Southern Wild (CdO)		Benh Zeitlin	United States
Children of Sarajevo	Djeca	Aida Begić	Bosnia and Herzegovina, Germany, France, Turkey
Confession of a Child of the Century	La confession d'un enfant du siècle	Sylvie Verheyde	France, Germany, United Kingdom
Gimme the Loot (CdO)		Adam Leon	United States
Horses of God	يا خيل الله	Nabil Ayouch	Morocco, Belgium
Le grand soir		Benoît Delépine and Gustave Kervern	France, Belgium
Laurence Anyways		Xavier Dolan	Canada
Miss Lovely (CdO)		Ashim Ahluwalia	India
Mystery	浮城谜事	Lou Ye	China
Our Children	Aimer à perdre la raison	Joachim Lafosse	Belgium, France
The Pirogue	La Pirogue	Moussa Toure	Senegal
La Playa D.C. (CdO)	La Playa	Juan Andrés Arango	Colombia, France, Brazil
Renoir		Gilles Bourdos	France
Student		Darezhan Omirbaev	Kazakhstan
Three Worlds	Trois mondes	Catherine Corsini	France
White Elephant	Elefante blanco	Pablo Trapero	Argentina, Spain, France

(CdO) indicates film eligible for the Caméra d'Or as directorial debut feature.

=== Out of Competition ===
The following films were screened out of competition:

English Title	Original Title	Director(s)	Production Country
Cruel Summer (short film)		Kanye West	United States, Qatar
Hemingway & Gellhorn		Philip Kaufman	United States
Madagascar 3: Europe's Most Wanted		Eric Darnell, Tom McGrath, Conrad Vernon	United States
Me and You	Io e te	Bernardo Bertolucci	Italy
Thérèse Desqueyroux (closing film)		Claude Miller	France
Midnight Screenings
Dracula 3D		Dario Argento	Italy, France, Spain
For Love's Sake	愛と誠	Takashi Miike	Japan
Maniac		Franck Khalfoun	United States, France
The Sapphires (CdO)		Wayne Blair	Australia
65th Anniversary
Film Anniversary: A Special Day	Le Film anniversaire: Une journée particulière: Histoire(s) de festival N°4	Gilles Jacob and Samuel Faure	France

(CdO) indicates film eligible for the Caméra d'Or as directorial debut feature.

=== Special Screenings ===
The following films were screened in the Special Screenings section:

English Title	Original Title	Director(s)	Production Country
The Central Park Five		Ken Burns, Sarah Burns and David McMahon	United States
Les invisibles		Sébastien Lifshitz	France
Journal de France		Claudine Nougaret and Raymond Depardon	France
Mekong Hotel		Apichatpong Weerasethakul	France
The Music According to Antonio Carlos Jobim	A Música Segundo Tom Jobim	Nelson Pereira dos Santos and Dora Jobim	France
The Oath of Tobruk	Le serment de Tobrouk	Bernard-Henri Lévy and Marc Roussel	France
Polluting Paradise	Der Müll im Garten Eden	Fatih Akın	Germany
The Resistance		Peng Zhang Li	China, United States
Roman Polanski: A Film Memoir		Laurent Bouzereau	United Kingdom, Italy, Germany
Trashed		Candida Brady	United States
Villegas (CdO)		Gonzalo Tobal	Argentina, Netherlands, France

(CdO) indicates film eligible for the Caméra d'Or as directorial debut feature.

=== Cinéfondation ===
The Cinéfondation section focuses on films made by students at film schools. The following entries were selected, out of more than 1,700 submissions from 320 different schools:

English Title	Original Title	Director(s)	School
Abigail		Matthew James Reilly	NYU, United States
The Ballad of Finn + Yeti		Meryl O'Connor	UCLA, United States
The Barber	Riyoushi	Shoichi Akino	Tokyo University of the Arts, Japan
Behind Me Olive Trees	Derrière moi les oliviers	Pascale Abou Jamra	ALBA, Lebanon
The Camp in Răzoare	Tabăra din Răzoare	Cristi Iftime	UNATC, Romania
Could See a Puma	Pude ver un puma	Eduardo Williams	UCINE, Argentina
Dog Leash	Resen	Eti Tsicko	TAU, Israel
Head over Heels		Timothy Reckart	NFTS, United Kingdom
The Hosts	Los anfitriones	Miguel Angel Moulet	EICTV, Cuba
Land	Terra	Piero Messina	CSC, Italy
Matteus		Leni Huyghe	Sint-Lukas Brussels, Belgium
The Raptures	Les Ravissements	Arthur Cahn	La Fémis, France
The Road To	Doroga na	Taisia Igumentseva	VGIK, Russia
Slug Invasion		Morten Helgeland	The Animation Workshop, Denmark
Tambylles		Michal Hogenauer	FAMU, Czech Republic

=== Short film Competition ===
Out of 4,500 submissions, the following films were selected for the short film competition:

English Title	Original Title	Director(s)	Production Country
The Chair		Grainger David	United States
Cockaigne		Emilie Verhamme	Belgium
Gasp		Eicke Bettinga	Germany
Herd Leader	Chef de meute	Chloé Robichaud	Canada
My Holy Glance	Mi Santa Mirada	Alvaro Aponte-Centeno	Puerto Rico
Night Shift		Zia Mandivwalla	New Zealand
Silent	Sessiz-Bêdeng	L. Rezan Yesilbas	Turkey
This Way Before Me	Ce Chemin Devant Moi	Mohamed Bourokba	France
Waiting for P.O. Box	Falastein, sandouk al intezar lil burtuqal	Bassam Chekhes	Syria
Yardbird		Michael Spiccia	Australia

=== Cannes Classics ===
The following films were screened in the Cannes Classics section. The Hungarian "montage film" Final Cut: Ladies and Gentlemen, directed by György Pálfi, was selected as the closing film for the Cannes Classics section.

English Title	Original Title	Director(s)	Production Country
Restored Prints
An All-Colored Vaudeville Show (1935)		Roy Mack	United States
The Ballad of Narayama (1958)	楢山節考	Keisuke Kinoshita	Japan
Cleo from 5 to 7 (1962)	Cléo de 5 à 7	Agnès Varda	France, Italy
A Great Day in Harlem (1994)		Jean Bach	United States
The Great Spy Chase (1964)	Les Barbouzes	Georges Lautner	France, Italy
Jammin' the Blues (1944) (short)		Gjon Mili	United States
Jaws (1975)		Steven Spielberg	United States
Journey to Italy (1954)	Viaggio in Italia	Roberto Rossellini	Italy, France
Lawrence of Arabia (1962)		David Lean	United Kingdom
Once Upon a Time in America (1984)	C'era una volta in America	Sergio Leone	Italy, United States
The Ring (1927)		Alfred Hitchcock	United Kingdom
Runaway Train (1985)		Andrei Konchalovsky	United States
Tess (1979)		Roman Polanski	France, United Kingdom
Twenty Years Later (1984)	Cabra Marcado para Morrer	Eduardo Coutinho	Brazil
Xica (1976)	Xica da Silva	Carlos Diegues	Brazil
World Cinema Foundation
After the Curfew (1954)	Lewat Djam Malam	Usmar Ismail	Indonesia
Kalpana (1954)	कल्पना	Uday Shankar	India
Documentaries about Cinema
Claude M Loves the Cinema	Claude Miller, cinéaste de l'intime	Emmanuel Barnault	France
Final Cut: Ladies and Gentlemen	Final Cut: Hölgyeim és uraim	György Pálfi	Hungary
Me and My Dad		Katrine Boorman	United Kingdom, Ireland
Method to the Madness of Jerry Lewis		Gregg Barson	United States
Woody Allen: A Documentary		Robert Weide	United States

=== Cinéma de la Plage ===
The Cinéma de la Plage is a part of the Official Selection of the festival. The outdoors screenings at the beach cinema of Cannes are open to the public.

English Title	Original Title	Director(s)	Production Country
Casino Royale (2006)		Martin Campbell	United Kingdom, United States, Germany, Czech Republic
Diamonds Are Forever (1971)		Guy Hamilton	United Kingdom
Dr. No (1962)		Terence Young	United Kingdom
From Russia with Love (1963)		Terence Young	United Kingdom
The Joker (1960)	Le farceur	Philippe de Broca	France
On Her Majesty's Secret Service (1969)		Peter Hunt	United Kingdom
Project A (1982)	A計劃	Jackie Chan	Hong Kong
Red Tails (2012)		Anthony Hemingway	United States

== Parallel Sections ==
=== Critics' Week ===
The line-up for the Critics' Week was announced on 23 April at the section's website. The feature competition consists entirely of directorial debuts, something the section's artistic director Charles Tesson stressed was not intentional, but only the way it turned out when the submissions had been judged by quality. The following films were selected:

English Title	Original Title	Director(s)	Production Country
In Competition
Beyond the Walls (CdO)	Hors les murs	David Lambert	Belgium, Canada, France
God's Neighbors (CdO)	המשגיחים	Meni Yaesh	Israel, France
Here and There (CdO)	Aquí y allá	Antonio Méndez Esparza	Spain, United States, Mexico
In a Rush (CdO)	Au galop	Louis-Do de Lencquesaing	France
Peddlers (CdO)	Halahal	Vasan Bala	India
Sofia's Last Ambulance (CdO)		Ilian Metev	Germany, Croatia, Bulgaria
The Wild Ones (CdO)	Los Salvajes	Alejandro Fadel	Argentina
Special Screenings
Augustine		Alice Winocour	France
Broken		Rufus Norris	United Kingdom
Maddened by His Absence	J'enrage de son absence	Sandrine Bonnaire	France, Luxembourg, Belgium
Short Films
Circle Line	순환선	Shin Su-won	South Korea
The Dickslap	La Bifle	Jean-Baptiste Saurel	France
Doppelgänger	O Duplo	Juliana Rojas	Brazil
Family Dinner		Stefan Constantinescu	Sweden
Hazara		Shay Levi	Israel
Horizon	Orizont	Paul Negoescu	Romania
It's Not a Cowboy Movie	Ce n'est pas un film de cow-boys	Benjamin Parent	France
Red River, Song Hong	Fleuve rouge, Song Hong	Stéphanie Lansaque & François Leroy	France
A Sunday Morning	Un dimanche matin	Damien Manivel	France
Yeguas y cotorras		Natalia Garagiola	Argentina

(CdO) indicates film eligible for the Caméra d'Or as directorial debut feature.

=== Directors' Fortnight ===
The line-up for the Directors' Fortnight was announced at a press conference on 24 April. The following films were selected:

English Title	Original Title	Director(s)	Production Country
3		Pablo Stoll	Uruguay, Germany, Argentina
Alyah (CdO)		Elie Wajeman	France
Camille Rewinds	Camille redouble	Noémie Lvovsky	France
Clandestine Childhood	Infancia clandestina	Benjamin Ávila	Argentina, Spain, Brazil
Dangerous Liaisons	危險關係	Hur Jin-ho	China, South Korea
Dream and Silence	Sueño y silencio	Jaime Rosales	Spain, France
Ernest & Celestine	Ernest et Célestine	Stéphane Aubier, Vincent Patar and Benjamin Renner	France, Belgium, Luxembourg
Fogo		Yulene Olaizola	Mexico, Canada
Gangs of Wasseypur		Anurag Kashyap	India
Granny's Funeral	Adieu Berthe, l'enterrement de mémé	Bruno Podalydès	France
Hold Back (CdO)	Rengaine	Rachid Djaïdani	France
The King of Pigs (CdO)	돼지의 왕	Yeon Sang-ho	South Korea
Night Across the Street	La noche de enfrente	Raúl Ruiz	France, Chile
No		Pablo Larraín	Chile, United States
Opération Libertad		Nicolas Wadimoff	Switzerland, France
The Repentant	التائب	Merzak Allouache	Algeria
Room 237 (CdO)		Rodney Ascher	United States
Sightseers		Ben Wheatley	United Kingdom
The Towrope (CdO)	La Sirga	William Vega	Colombia, France, Mexico
The We and the I		Michel Gondry	United States
Yek Khanévadéh-e Mohtaram (CdO)		Massoud Bakhshi	Iran
Short Films
The Curse		Fyzal Boulifa	United Kingdom, Morocco
Drawn from Memory	Portret z pamięci	Marcin Bortkiewicz	Poland
Enraged Pigs	Porcos Raivosos	Leonardo Sette and Isabel Penoni	Brazil
Königsberg		Philipp Mayrhofer	France
The Living Also Cry	Os Vivos Tambem Choram	Basil da Cunha	Switzerland, Portugal
The Living Dead	Os mortos-vivos	Anita Rocha da Silveira	Brazil
Rodri		Franco Lolli	France
Tram		Michaela Pavlátová	France, Czech Republic
With Jeff	Avec Jeff, à moto	Marie-Ève Juste	Canada
Wrong Cops		Quentin Dupieux	France

(CdO) indicates film eligible for the Caméra d'Or as directorial debut feature.

== Official Awards ==
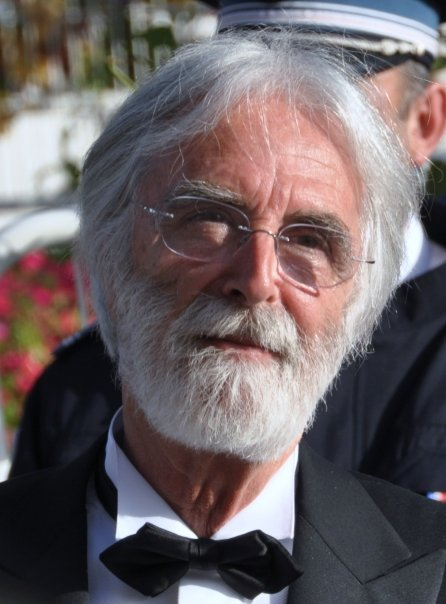
Michael Haneke, winner of the 2012 Palme d'Or

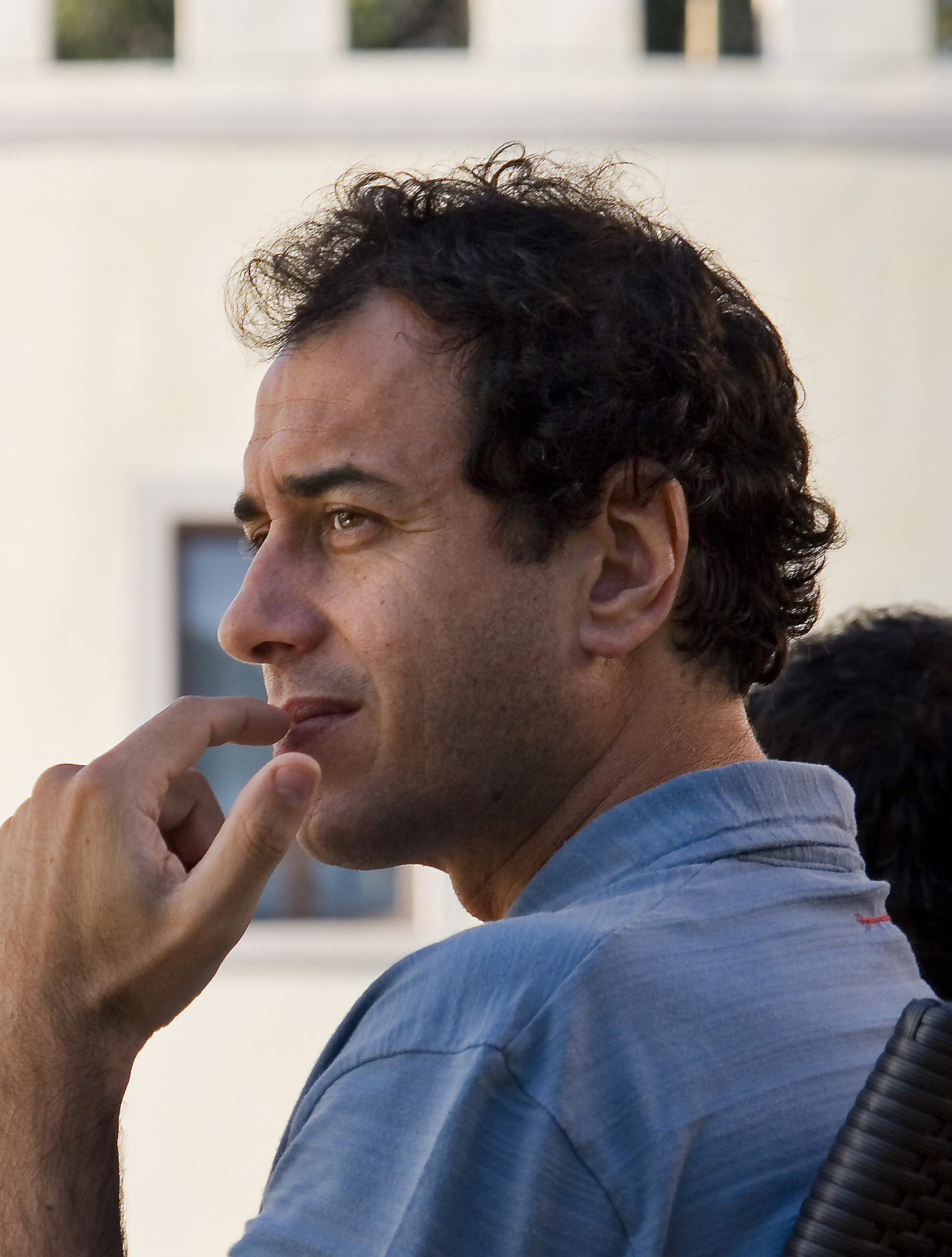
Matteo Garrone, winner of the 2012 Grand Prix

The Palme d'Or was won by the French-language film Amour directed by Michael Haneke. Haneke previously won the award for The White Ribbon in 2009. Love tells the story of an elderly couple preparing for death. During his acceptance speech, the director said "A very, very big thanks to my actors who have made this film. It's their film. They are the essence of this film." Moretti said that none of the winners had been selected unanimously, and described such an outcome as "a middle ground that would have pleased no one". He revealed that Holy Motors, Paradise: Love and Post Tenebras Lux were the entries that most had divided the jury.

The following films and people received the 2012 Official selection awards:

=== In Competition ===
- Palme d'Or: Amour by Michael Haneke
- Grand Prix: Reality by Matteo Garrone
- Best Director: Carlos Reygadas for Post Tenebras Lux
- Best Screenplay: Beyond the Hills by Cristian Mungiu
- Best Actress: Cristina Flutur and Cosmina Stratan for Beyond the Hills
- Best Actor: Mads Mikkelsen for The Hunt
- Jury Prize: The Angels' Share by Ken Loach

=== Un Certain Regard ===
- Prix Un Certain Regard: Después de Lucía by Michel Franco
- Un Certain Regard Special Jury Prize: Le grand soir by Benoît Delépine and Gustave de Kervern
- Un Certain Regard Special Distinction: Children of Sarajevo by Aida Begić
- Un Certain Regard Award for Best Actress:
  - Émilie Dequenne in Loving Without Reason
  - Suzanne Clément in Laurence Anyways

=== Caméra d'Or ===
- Beasts of the Southern Wild by Benh Zeitlin

=== Cinéfondation ===
- 1st Prize: The Road to by Taisia Igumentseva
- 2nd Prize: Abigail by Matthew James Reilly
- 3rd Prize: The Hosts by Miguel Angel Moulet

=== Short Films Competition ===
- Short Film Palme d'Or: Silent by L. Rezan Yesilbas

== Independent Awards ==
=== FIPRESCI Prizes ===
- In the Fog by Sergei Loznitsa (In Competition)
- Beasts of the Southern Wild by Benh Zeitlin (Un Certain Regard)
- Hold Back by Rachid Djaïdani (Directors' Fortnight)

=== Vulcan Award of the Technical Artist ===
- Vulcan Award: Charlotte Bruus Christensen (cinematography) for The Hunt

=== Prize of the Ecumenical Jury ===
- The Hunt by Thomas Vinterberg
  - Special Mention: Beasts of the Southern Wild by Benh Zeitlin

=== Critics' Week ===
- Grand Prix Nespresso: Aquí y allá by Antonio Méndez Esparza
- France 4 Visionary Award: Sofia's Last Ambulance by Ilian Metev
- Prix SACD: God's Neighbors by Meni Yaesh
- ACID/CCAS Prize: The Wild Ones by Alejandro Fadel

=== Directors' Fortnight ===
- Art Cinema Award: No by Pablo Larraín
- Europa Cinemas Label: The Repentant by Merzak Allouache
- Prix SACD: Camille Rewinds by Noémie Lvovsky
  - Special mention Prix SACD: Ernest & Celestine by Stéphane Aubier, Vincent Patar, Benjamin Renner
- Premier Prix Illy for Short Filmmaking: The Curse by Fyzal Boulifa
  - Special mention Prix Illy: The Living Also Cry by Basil da Cunha

=== Prize of the Youth Jury ===
- Prix de la Jeunesse: Holy Motors by Leos Carax
- Prix Regard Jeune: Beasts of the Southern Wild by Benh Zeitlin

=== Prix François Chalais ===
- Horses of God by Nabil Ayouch

=== Queer Palm ===
- Laurence Anyways by Xavier Dolan
- Best Short Film: It's Not a Cowboy Movie by Benjamin Parent

=== Palm Dog Jury ===
- Palm Dog Award: Smurf in Sightseers
- Grand Jury Prize: Billy Bob in Le grand soir
