= The Towrope =

- Film poster
- Spanish: La sirga
- Directed by: William Vega
- Starring: Joghis Seudin Arias; Julio César Roble
- Release date: 19 May 2012 (CFF)
- Running time: 88 minutes
- Countries: Colombia; France; Mexico
- Language: Spanish

The Towrope (Spanish: La sirga) is a 2012 drama film directed by William Vega. The film was screened at the Directors' Fortnight event of the 2012 Cannes Film Festival. It is a co-production between Colombia, France and Mexico.
