= 33rd Independent Spirit Awards =

US film awards ceremony in 2018

- Awarded for: Best in independent film
- Date: March 3, 2018
- Site: Santa Monica Pier; Santa Monica, California, U.S.
- Hosted by: Nick Kroll; John Mulaney

Highlights
- Best Feature: Get Out
- Most awards: Call Me by Your Name, Get Out, I, Tonya, and Three Billboards Outside Ebbing, Missouri (2)
- Most nominations: Call Me by Your Name (6)

Television coverage
- Channel: IFC

The 33rd Film Independent Spirit Awards, honoring the best independent films of 2017, were presented by Film Independent on March 3, 2018. The nominations were announced on November 21, 2017 by actresses Lily Collins and Tessa Thompson. The ceremony was televised in the United States by IFC, taking place inside its usual tent setting on a beach in Santa Monica, California. Nick Kroll and John Mulaney returned to host the ceremony for the second time.

== Winners and nominees ==
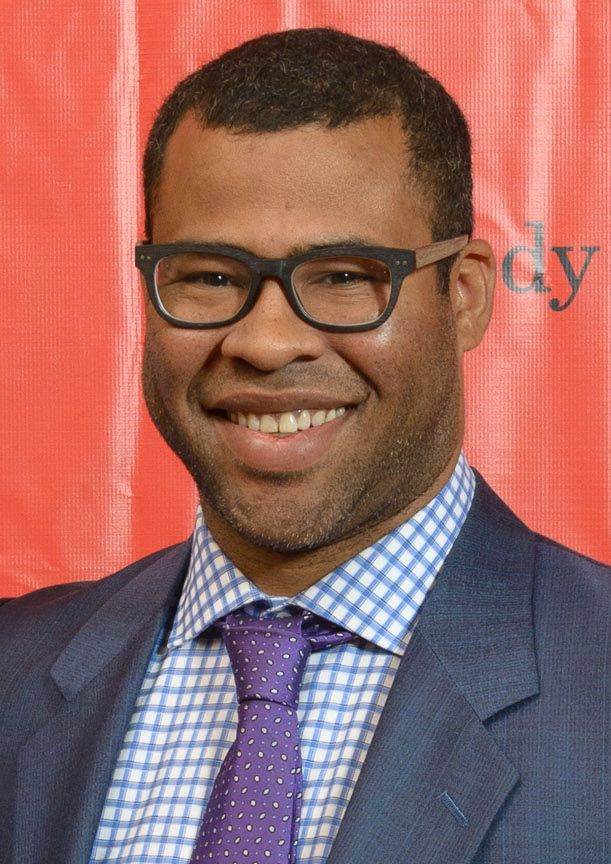
Jordan Peele, Best Director winner

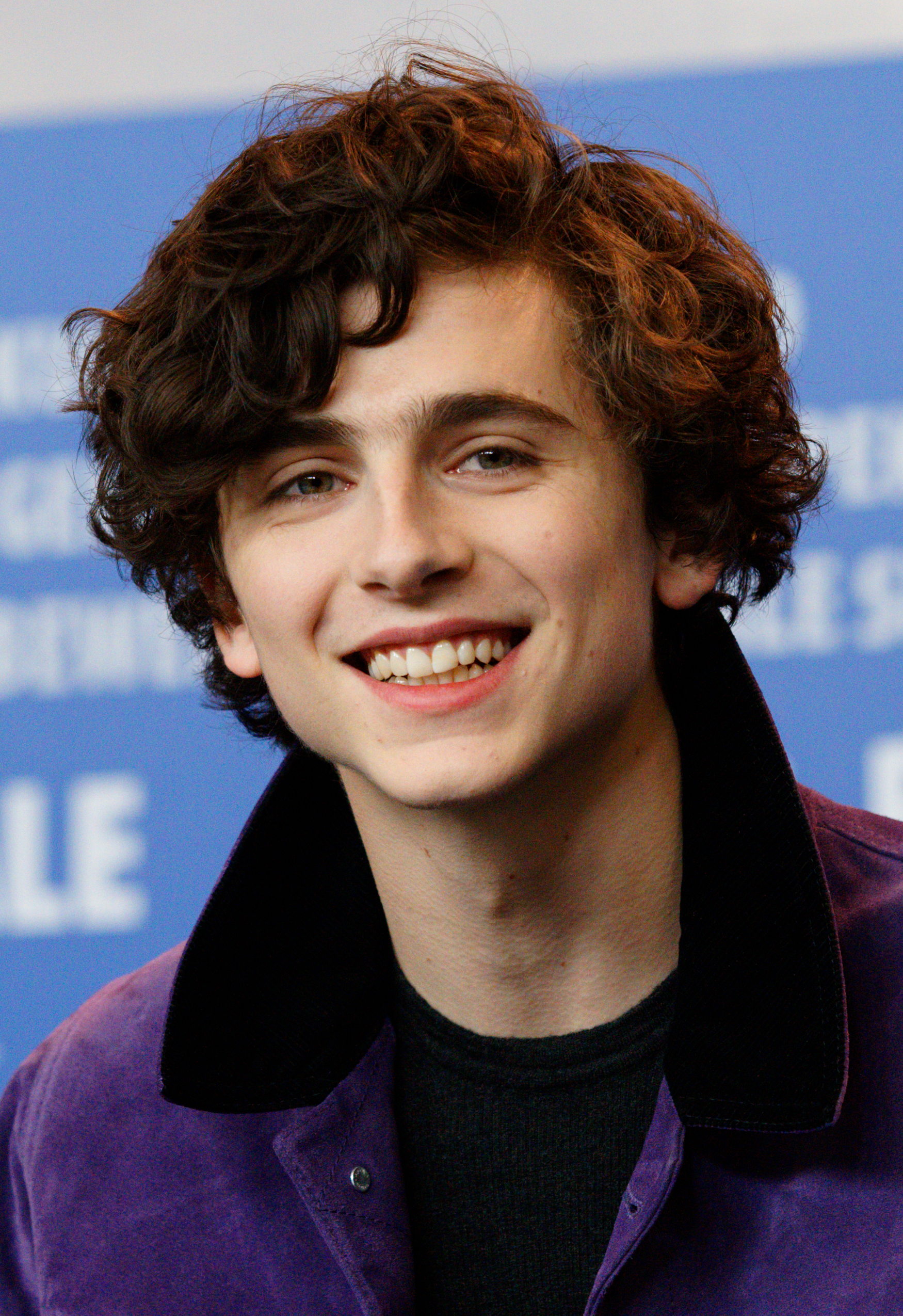
Timothée Chalamet, Best Male Lead winner

Frances McDormand, Best Female Lead winner

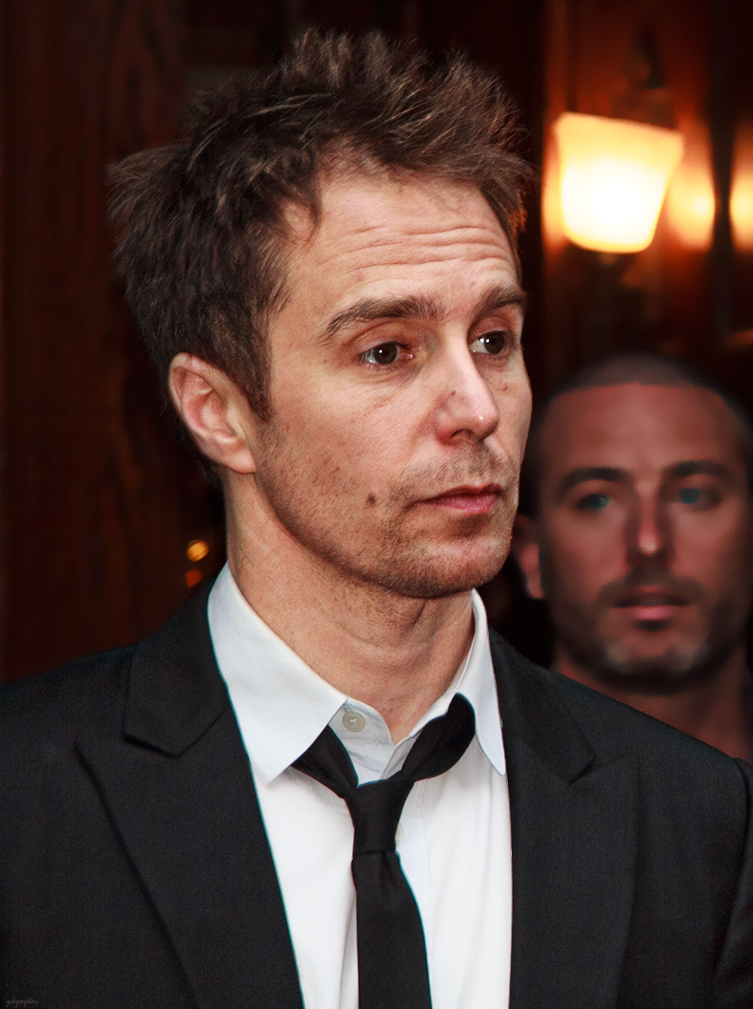
Sam Rockwell, Best Supporting Male winner

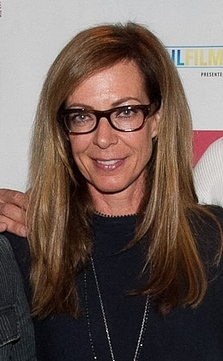
Allison Janney, Best Supporting Female winner

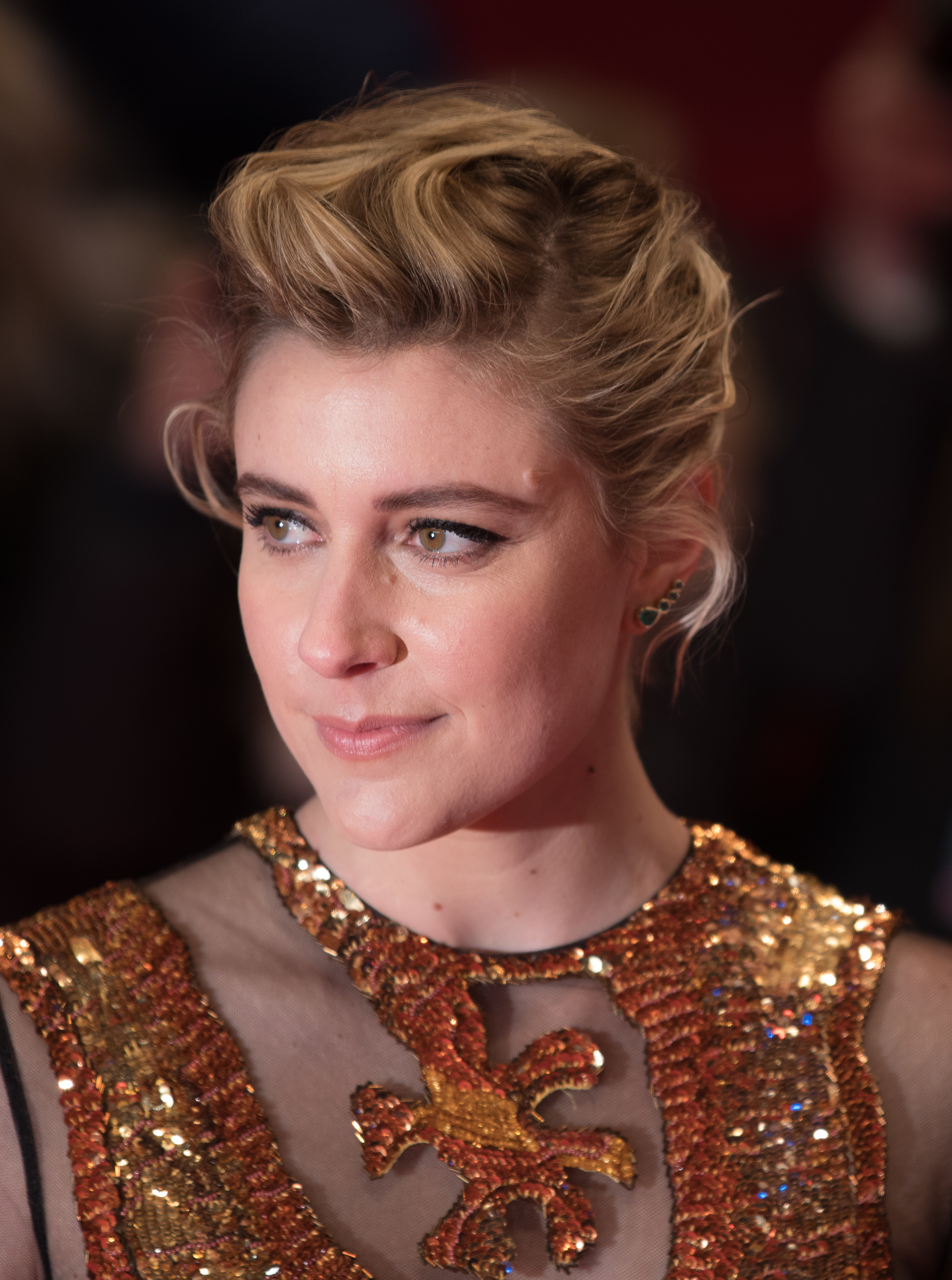
Greta Gerwig, Best Screenplay winner

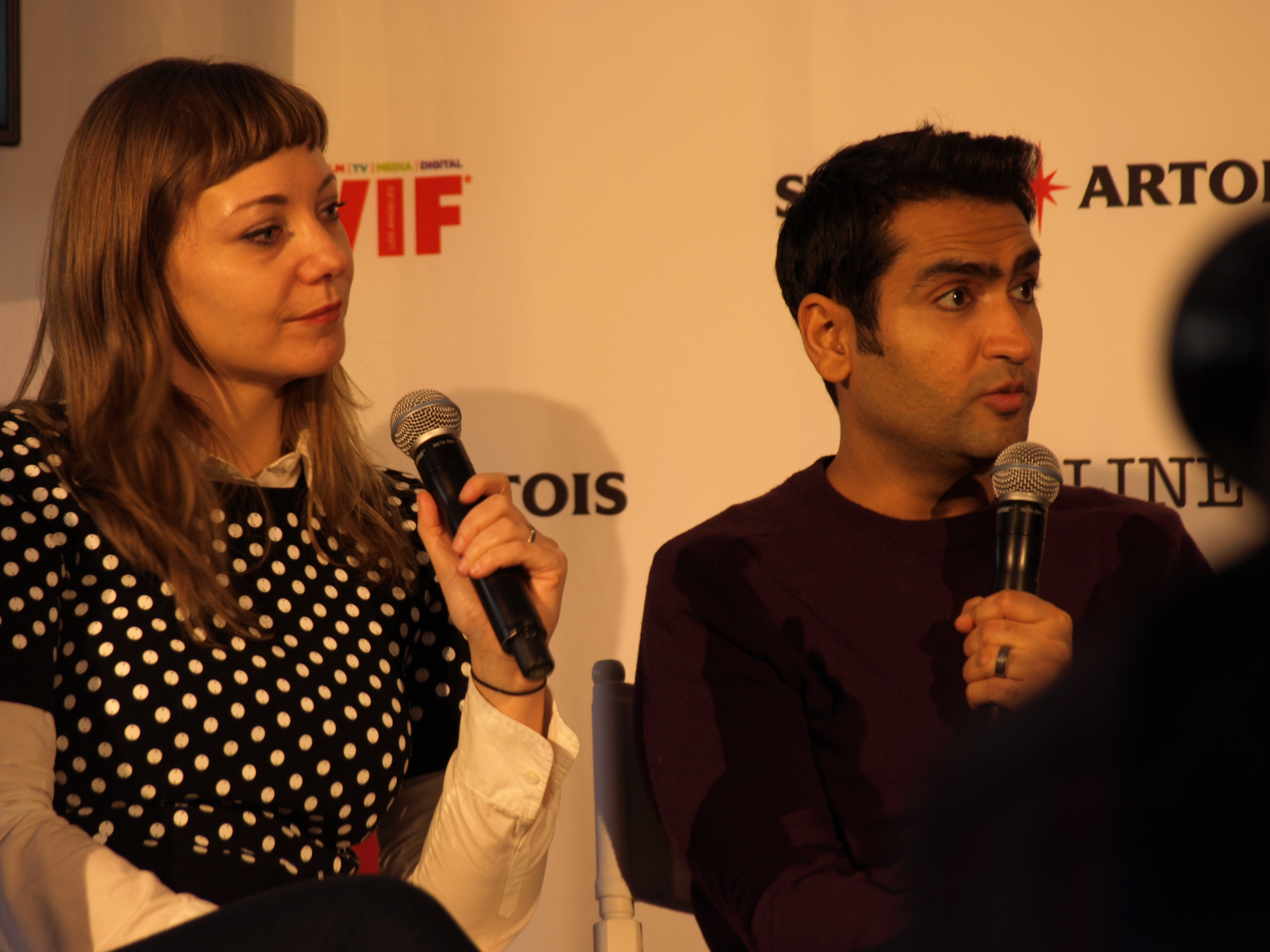
Emily V. Gordon and Kumail Nanjiani, Best First Screenplay winners

Best Feature	Best Director
Get Out: Call Me by Your Name; The Florida Project; Lady Bird; The Rider	Jordan Peele – Get Out: Sean Baker – The Florida Project; Jonas Carpignano – A Ciambra; Luca Guadagnino – Call Me by Your Name; Safdie brothers – Good Time; Chloé Zhao – The Rider
Best Male Lead	Best Female Lead
Timothée Chalamet – Call Me by Your Name as Elio Perlman: Harris Dickinson – Beach Rats as Frankie; James Franco – The Disaster Artist as Tommy Wiseau; Daniel Kaluuya – Get Out as Chris Washington; Robert Pattinson – Good Time as Constantine "Connie" Nikas	Frances McDormand – Three Billboards Outside Ebbing, Missouri as Mildred Hayes: Salma Hayek – Beatriz at Dinner as Beatriz; Margot Robbie – I, Tonya as Tonya Harding; Saoirse Ronan – Lady Bird as Christine "Lady Bird" McPherson; Shinobu Terajima – Oh Lucy! as Setsuko Kawashima / Lucy; Regina Williams – Life and Nothing More as Regina
Best Supporting Male	Best Supporting Female
Sam Rockwell – Three Billboards Outside Ebbing, Missouri as Jason Dixon: Nnamdi Asomugha – Crown Heights as Carl "KC" King; Armie Hammer – Call Me by Your Name as Oliver; Barry Keoghan – The Killing of a Sacred Deer as Martin; Benny Safdie – Good Time as Nick Nikas	Allison Janney – I, Tonya as LaVona Golden: Holly Hunter – The Big Sick as Beth Gardner; Laurie Metcalf – Lady Bird as Marion McPherson; Lois Smith – Marjorie Prime as Marjorie Prime; Taliah Lennice Webster – Good Time as Crystal
Best Screenplay	Best First Screenplay
Greta Gerwig – Lady Bird: Azazel Jacobs – The Lovers; Martin McDonagh – Three Billboards Outside Ebbing, Missouri; Jordan Peele – Get Out; Mike White – Beatriz at Dinner	Emily V. Gordon and Kumail Nanjiani – The Big Sick: Kristopher Avedisian, Kyle Espeleta, and Jesse Wakeman – Donald Cried; Ingrid Jungermann – Women Who Kill; Kogonada – Columbus; David Branson Smith and Matt Spicer – Ingrid Goes West
Best First Feature	Best Documentary Feature
Matt Spicer – Ingrid Goes West: Atsuko Hirayanagi – Oh Lucy!; Geremy Jasper – Patti Cake$; Kogonada – Columbus; Joshua Z Weinstein – Menashe	Faces Places: The Departure; Last Men in Aleppo; Motherland; Quest
Best Cinematography	Best Editing
Sayombhu Mukdeeprom – Call Me by Your Name: Thimios Bakatakis – The Killing of a Sacred Deer; Elisha Christian – Columbus; Hélène Louvart – Beach Rats; Joshua James Richards – The Rider	Tatiana S. Riegel – I, Tonya: Ronald Bronstein and Benny Safdie – Good Time; Walter Fasano – Call Me by Your Name; Alex O'Flinn – The Rider; Gregory Plotkin – Get Out
Best International Film
A Fantastic Woman (Una mujer fantástica) (Chile): BPM (Beats per Minute) (France); I Am Not a Witch (United Kingdom); Lady Macbeth (United Kingdom); Loveless (Nelyubov) (Russia)

=== Films with multiple nominations and awards ===
Films that received multiple nominations
Nominations	Film
6	Call Me by Your Name
5	Get Out
5	Good Time
4	Columbus
4	Lady Bird
4	The Rider
3	I, Tonya
3	Three Billboards Outside Ebbing, Missouri
2	Beach Rats
2	Beatriz at Dinner
2	The Big Sick
2	Dayveon
2	The Florida Project
2	Ingrid Goes West
2	The Killing of a Sacred Deer
2	Life and Nothing More
2	The Lovers
2	Oh Lucy!
2	Quest

Films that won multiple awards
Awards	Film
2	Call Me by Your Name
2	Get Out
2	I, Tonya
2	Three Billboards Outside Ebbing, Missouri

== Special awards ==
=== John Cassavetes Award ===
- Life and Nothing More
  - Dayveon
  - A Ghost Story
  - Most Beautiful Island
  - The Transfiguration

=== Robert Altman Award ===
(The award is given to its film director, casting director, and ensemble cast)

- Mudbound – Dee Rees, Billy Hopkins, Ashley Ingram, Jonathan Banks, Mary J. Blige, Jason Clarke, Garrett Hedlund, Jason Mitchell, Rob Morgan and Carey Mulligan

=== Kiehl's Someone to Watch Award ===
Recognizes a talented filmmaker of singular vision who has not yet received appropriate recognition. The award includes a $25,000 unrestricted grant funded by Kiehl's.

- Justin Chon – Gook
  - Amman Abbasi – Dayveon
  - Kevin Phillips – Super Dark Times

=== The BONNIE Award ===
The inaugural award recognizes a mid-career female director with a body of work that demonstrates uniqueness of vision and a groundbreaking approach to filmmaking. The award includes a $50,000 unrestricted grant funded by American Airlines.

- Chloé Zhao
  - So Yong Kim
  - Lynn Shelton

=== Piaget Producers Award ===
Honors emerging producers who, despite highly limited resources, demonstrate the creativity, tenacity and vision required to produce quality, independent films. The award includes a $25,000 unrestricted grant funded by Piaget.

- Summer Shelton – Keep the Change
  - Giulia Caruso and Ki Jin Kim – Columbus
  - Ben LeClair – The Lovers

=== Truer than Fiction Award ===
Presented to an emerging director of non-fiction features who has not yet received significant recognition. The award includes a $25,000 unrestricted grant.

- Jonathan Olshefski – Quest
  - Shevaun Mizrahi – Distant Constellation
  - Jeff Unay – The Cage Fighter

== See also ==
- 90th Academy Awards
- 75th Golden Globe Awards
- 71st British Academy Film Awards
- 38th Golden Raspberry Awards
- 24th Screen Actors Guild Awards
- 23rd Critics' Choice Awards
