= Living Proof (2017 film) =

2017 film about Multiple sclerosis

- Directed by: Matt Embry
- Produced by: Matt Embry; Tyler McLeod; Ravinder Minhas
- Edited by: Todd Langille
- Music by: Adam Naugler
- Release date: September 8, 2017
- Running time: 97 minutes
- Language: English

Living Proof is a documentary directed by Matt Embry, released in 2017. The documentary explores Embry's story of living with Multiple sclerosis (MS). Embry visits several MS patients and learns about their lifestyle changes and the progression of the autoimmune disease. Since there is no cure for multiple sclerosis, Embry and his father embark on a journey to find answers and hope.

== Director ==
Matt Embry is from Calgary, Alberta Canada. He was diagnosed with MS at the age of 19 in 1995. Embry is a filmmaker, director, and the former president/founder of Spotlight Television and Film Productions. He directed World of Hurt (2011), Theo Fleury: Playing with Fire (2011), Gunner (2017), and Painkiller: Inside the Opioid Crisis (2018).

== Synopsis ==
The documentary begins with Embry speaking to an MS patient named Larry Findlater. Findlater talks about how the disease progressed for him and his engagement with experimental drug programs.

Embry meets with MS experts. He and the filming crew interview George Ebers, a neurologist and MS researcher at Oxford University. Ebers discusses triggers and the two stages of multiple sclerosis. Embry travels to California to explore a stem cell treatment for MS. He speaks with Christopher Duma and Viola Tsang, an MS patient, who has undergone stem cell therapy and visits Jeff Beal and his wife. Beal's wife had contacted Mike Dake, a cardiothoracic surgeon who speaks about treating patients for chronic cerebrospinal venous insufficiency (CCSVI).

When Embry was diagnosed with MS, his father, Ashton Embry, a research scientist, found that there are no effective treatments for multiple sclerosis. Dr. Embry focused on diet and vitamin D treatment. The documentary depicts several MS patients and their lifestyle changes.

David Lyons is an MS patient who shows his fitness and diet lifestyle changes. Judy Graham is an author who has been diagnosed with MS for 43 years. Lastly, physician Terry Wahls talks about the improvements she has seen after changing her diet and lifestyle.

== Reception ==
Living Proof premiered at the 2017 Toronto International Film Festival. The documentary was awarded the 2019 Special Recognition Director's Choice Award for Best Indie Spirit/ Documentary, 2019 Audience Choice for Best Documentary Feature, and was featured at the Sedona International Film Festival.
