= Life and Nothing More =

2017 film

- Film poster
- Directed by: Antonio Méndez Esparza
- Written by: Antonio Méndez Esparza
- Production company: Aquí y Allí Films
- Distributed by: Wanda Vision
- Release dates: 8 September 2017 (TIFF); 1 December 2017 (Spain)
- Country: Spain
- Language: English

Life and Nothing More is a 2017 Spanish drama film directed by Antonio Méndez Esparza. It was screened in the Contemporary World Cinema section at the 2017 Toronto International Film Festival. It was produced by Aquí y Allí Films (Pedro Hernández Santos) with support from ICAA, TVE and Movistar+. Distributed by Wanda Vision, it was theatrically released in Spain on 1 December 2017. The film was critically praised and received several accolades, winning the John Cassavetes Award at the Independent Spirit Awards.

== See also ==
- List of Spanish films of 2017
