= 3/4 (film) =

2017 film

- Film poster
- Directed by: Ilian Metev
- Written by: Ilian Metev
- Starring: Mila Mihova
- Release date: 6 August 2017 (Locarno)
- Running time: 83 minutes
- Country: Bulgaria
- Language: Bulgarian

3/4 is a 2017 Bulgarian drama film directed by Ilian Metev. It was screened in the Discovery section at the 2017 Toronto International Film Festival.

== Cast ==
- Mila Mihova as Mila
- Nikolay Mashalov as Niki
- Todor Veltchev as Todor
