= Copanatoyac (municipality) =

Municipality in the Mexican state of Guerrero

- Municipality
- Location in Mexico
- Coordinates: 17°22′N 98°41′W
- Country: Mexico
- State: Guerrero
- Municipal seat: Copanatoyac

Area
  - Total: 388.4 km^{2} (150.0 sq mi)

Population (2005)
  - Total: 17,337

Copanatoyac is a municipality in the Mexican state of Guerrero. The municipal seat lies at Copanatoyac. The municipality covers an area of 388.4 km^{2}.

As of 2005, the municipality had a total population of 17,337.
