= Final Cut: Ladies and Gentlemen =

2012 film directed by György Pálfi

- Directed by: György Pálfi
- Written by: György Pálfi; Zsófia Ruttkay
- Story by: György Pálfi
- Produced by: Viktor Dénes Huszár; Péter Miskolczi; György Pálfi; Béla Tarr; Gábor Téni; Gábor Váradi
- Edited by: György Pálfi, Károly Szalai
- Release dates: 2012 (Cannes Film Festival); 2016 (Internet)
- Country: Hungary
- Language: None

Final Cut: Ladies and Gentlemen (Hungarian: Final Cut: Hölgyeim és uraim) is a 2012 Hungarian experimental romantic film. It is directed by György Pálfi. The film is a mashup realized with 451 clips from the most famous films in history. The "montage film" was selected as the closing film for the 2012 Cannes Classics section.

== Synopsis ==
The film tells about a love story between a man and a woman, told using scenes edited together from hundreds of other films from various genres. The film includes presences from numerous international actors and actresses via archive footages including:

- Isabelle Adjani
- Woody Allen
- Agustín Almodóvar
- Fanny Ardant
- Rosanna Arquette
- Javier Bardem
- Brigitte Bardot
- Kim Basinger
- Jean-Paul Belmondo
- Ingrid Bergman
- Marlon Brando
- Jeff Bridges
- Nicolas Cage
- Claudia Cardinale
- Àlex Casanovas
- Jackie Chan
- Charles Chaplin
- Sean Connery
- Tom Cruise
- Willem Dafoe
- Geena Davis
- Johnny Depp
- Alain Delon
- Gérard Depardieu
- Laura Dern
- Leonardo DiCaprio
- Kirk Douglas
- Robert Duvall
- Mia Farrow
- Henry Fonda
- Jodie Foster
- Morgan Freeman
- Greta Garbo
- Mel Gibson
- Hugh Grant
- Tom Hanks
- Ethan Hawke
- Holly Hunter
- Irène Jacob
- Hugh Jackman
- Nicole Kidman
- Janet Leigh
- Gina Lollobrigida
- Sophia Loren
- Marcello Mastroianni
- John Malkovich
- Carmen Maura
- Malcolm McDowell
- Ewan McGregor
- Bill Murray
- Václav Neckář
- Gary Oldman
- Al Pacino
- Dennis Quaid
- Keanu Reeves
- Jason Robards
- Isabella Rossellini
- Mickey Rourke
- Sylvester Stallone
- James Stewart
- Meryl Streep
- Audrey Tautou
- Liv Tyler
- Patrick Swayze
- Magda Vašáryová
- Jon Voight
- Christopher Walken

== Release ==
Final Cut: Ladies and Gentlemen was screened in numerous film festivals in 2012. It was officially released in 2016 on YouTube and in 2017 on Vimeo.
