= Nina (2017 film) =

2017 film

- Film poster
- Directed by: Juraj Lehotský
- Written by: Juraj Lehotský
- Starring: Bibiana Nováková
- Release date: 3 July 2017 (Karlovy Vary)
- Running time: 86 minutes
- Country: Slovakia
- Language: Slovak

Nina is a 2017 Slovak drama film directed by Juraj Lehotský. It was screened in the Contemporary World Cinema section at the 2017 Toronto International Film Festival.

== Cast ==
- Bibiana Nováková
- Robert Roth
- Petra Fornayová
- Josef Kleindienst
