= Gasp (2012 film) =

- Official Poster
- Directed by: Eicke Bettinga
- Written by: Eicke Bettinga; Samuel Huang
- Produced by: Samuel Huang
- Starring: Jan Amazigh Sid; Gianni Scülfort; Julie Trappett; Philippe Jacq
- Cinematography: Eicke Bettinga
- Edited by: Oliver Szyza
- Music by: John Dowland
- Release dates: 26 May 2012 (Cannes Film Festival); 26 October 2012 (Germany)
- Running time: 15 minutes
- Countries: Germany, Taiwan
- Languages: German, French

Gasp is a German-Taiwanese short film drama written and directed by Eicke Bettinga. The film premiered in the Official Selection at the 2012 Cannes Film Festival where it was nominated for the Short Film Palme d'Or.

== Plot ==
It's the story about a teenager who only has one wish: to feel something - anything. One day he pushes his longing to the limit.

== Critical reception ==
"Eicke Bettinga touches on the big, abstract themes of solidarity, of human connection, of isolation, numbness and sacrifice."— Cannes Nisimazine
