= Nick Gorman =

Nick Gorman (born 7 July 1965) is a television and film director based in the United Kingdom. Gorman graduated from Dartington College of Arts with a degree in Theatre.

== Filmography ==
Year	Title	Role	Notes
2017	The Darkness of the Moor	1st Assistant Director	Post-production
2017	10x10	1st Assistant Director	Filming
2017	Waiting for You	1st Assistant Director	
2015	Dartmoor Killing	1st Assistant Director	
2011	Everywhere and Nowhere	1st Assistant Director	
2008	Flick	1st Assistant Director	Starring Faye Dunaway
1999	The Bench	1st Assistant Director	
