= Guillermo Rosales =

Cuban novelist (1946–1993)

Guillermo Rosales (1946–1993) was a Cuban novelist. A double exile, writing in reaction both to Cuba's totalitarian regime and to the indifference of Cuban-American exiles bent on achieving the American Dream, Rosales created some of the best Cuban literature of the second half of the twentieth century, garnering comparisons to Carlos Montenegro and Reinaldo Arenas.

== Biography ==
Born in Havana, Rosales was a lifelong misfit diagnosed with schizophrenia. A journalist and writer while still in Cuba, he had an early brush with fame when his novel El Juego de la Viola, was a finalist in the reputable "Casa de las Americas" contest. But in 1979, he fled Castro's regime and went into exile in Miami, where he disappeared from public view. He ended up in halfway houses, "those marginal refuges where the desperate and hopeless go." The time he spent there provided the author with the material to write his most famous and viscerally haunting novella, Boarding Home (known in English as The Halfway House). He was the winner of the prestigious 1987 "Letras de Oros" (Golden Letters) contest, judged by the Mexican poet and Nobel laureate Octavio Paz. Rosales committed suicide in Miami in 1993, at the age of 47. Before doing so, he destroyed most of his work. Two novels survived: El Juego de la Viola (1967) and Boarding Home (1987). In 2013, the Cuban writers Elizabeth Mirabal and Carlos Velazco published the book "Talking about Guillermo Rosales" (Editorial Silueta).

Boarding Home was translated into English by Anna Kushner as The Halfway House and published by New Directions in 2009, featuring a preface by Jose Manuel Prieto. It has been hailed for its precise, lapidary style and its uncompromising treatment of personal responsibility for totalitarian rule. Publishers Weekly (Starred Review) praised it as a "frightening, nihilistic cousin of One Flew Over the Cuckoo's Nest".

El Juego de la Viola is forthcoming from New Directions under the title Leapfrog.
