= Joan Chemla =

French film director

Joan Chemla (born in 1984) is a French film director.

== Biography ==
After an initial stint in law and journalism, Joan Chemla wrote, produced, and directed her first short film Mauvaise Route in 2008. She later directed Dr Nazi, an adaptation from a Charles Bukowski short story (which won Canal+ award at the Clermont-Ferrand film festival) and L'homme à la cervelle d'or (The man with the golden brain), from a short story by Alphonse Daudet. Her first feature, If You Saw His Heart (Si tu voyais son cœur) premiered at the 2017 Toronto International Film Festival in the Platform competition. Following this selection, Cameron Bailey, the artistic director of the festival, remarked that "Joan Chemla is someone who will have a long career as somebody who makes personal films. There’s an individual stamp here.”
