= Oh Lucy! (2014 film) =

Short film by Atsuko Hirayanagi

- Sundance film poster
- Directed by: Atsuko Hirayanagi
- Written by: Atsuko Hirayanagi
- Produced by: Atsuko Hirayanagi; Masumi Soga; Ken Natsuhara; Perry Loong
- Starring: Kaori Momoi; Billy Scott; Keiichi Tsuda
- Cinematography: Mitch Arens
- Release date: 2014
- Running time: 21 minutes
- Countries: Japan; Singapore; United States
- Language: Japanese

Oh Lucy! is a 2014 short film directed by Atsuko Hirayanagi. The short film made its world premiere at the 2014 Cannes Film Festival receiving second place in the Cinéfondation. Oh Lucy! has since become Academy Qualified by winning the Best International Short Film Award at the 2015 Flickerfest as well as the Short Film Jury Award: International Fiction at the 2015 Sundance Film Festival.

Hirayanagi later made the film into a feature film version, released in 2017.

== Synopsis ==
Setsuko, a 55-year-old single "office lady" in Tokyo, is given a blonde wig and a new identity, "Lucy", by her young unconventional English instructor. "Lucy" awakens desires Setsuko never knew she had. When the instructor suddenly disappears, Setsuko must come to terms with what remains – herself.

== Awards ==
Awards for Oh Lucy!
Year	Association	Award Category	Status
2015	Sundance Film Festival	Short Film Jury Award: International Fiction	Won
2015	Flickerfest	Best Short Film	Won
2015	Chicago International Film Festival	Audience Choice Award for Best Short Film	Won
2015	Vail Film Festival	Best Short Film	Won
2015	24FPS International Short Film Festival	Silver Medal	Won
2015	24FPS International Short Film Festival	Horizon Award	Won
2015	24FPS International Short Film Festival	Best Director	Won
2015	24FPS International Short Film Festival	Best Actress (Kaori Momoi)	Won
2015	Hell's Half Mile Film & Music Festival	Best Short Film	Won
2015	LA Film Festival	Special Jury Mention for Best Actress	Won
2015	Tel Aviv International Student Film Festival	Best Director	Won
2014	Cannes Film Festival	2nd place (Cinéfondation Category)	Won
2014	Toronto International Film Festival	Honorable Mention (Best Short Film)	Won

== Release ==
The short has been shown at over 50 film festivals and is currently touring in theaters as a part of the Sundance Film Festival Award-winning short film tour.
