= Stefan Constantinescu =

Ștefan Constantinescu
- Born: 1968 (age 57–58); Bucharest, Romania
- Known for: artist, filmmaker, painting

Ștefan Constantinescu (born 10 February 1968) is a Swedish-Romanian visual artist and film director living and working in Stockholm. He works with various mediums including film, artist books and paintings approaching the political through introspection to challenge notions of identity, while working in and with issues of post-communist Romania. Constantinescu grew up in Romania during the most austere years of communism, where an ordinary day began with a queue for almost anything (bread, shampoo, gas) - days of routine. As a result, his work is often strongly autobiographical. Within the work, monuments are challenged as permanent inscriptions of memory, fictional films resemble unofficial documentaries, and artist books challenge history and education. Known for his "powerful study of everyday terror" in his short film Troleibuzul 92 that was shown in the Venice Biennale 2009

Recent work includes the painting series An Infinite Blue, the pop up book The Golden Age for Children, the film My Beautiful Dacia (co-directed with Julio Sotto) and the film Passagen. Stefan is currently (2011) working on the curatorial project The Last Analog Revolution, a Memory Box together with Xandra Popescu, who creates film, text and video projects.

== Works ==
In 2009 Stefan Constantinescu, Andrea Faciu and Ciprian Muresan submitted the project The Seductiveness of the Interval curated by Alina Serban for the Venice Biennale The project was selected to represent Romania at the Biennale, along with the films: Passagen and Troleibuzul 92. That same year The Seductiveness of the Interval project was remade and exhibited at The Renaissance Society Museum in Chicago.

In 2007, he had a solo show "Thank you for a Wonderful, Ordinary Day" at the National Museum of Contemporary Art in Bucharest.

=== The Last Analog Revolution, a Memory Box ===
In his 2011 project with Xandra Popescu, Constantinescu is bringing together artists from Eastern and Western Europe. It reflects on the evolving concepts of revolution and geo-political division. The exhibition incorporates a cardboard installation with a series of video works by Hungarian artist Péter Forgács, Poland's Zuzanna Janin, UK-based collaborators Karen Mirza and Brad Butler, Lithuanian Deimantas Narkevičius and Switzerland's Yves Netzhammer, sound-work by Liliana Moro, a sculpture by Via Lewandowski and Constantinescu's own film My Beautiful Dacia. The project will be exhibited at the 54th Venice Biennale in autumn, 2011. The Last Analog Revolution, a Memory Box functions within the framework of the project Romanian Cultural Resolution – documentary and will be exhibited at the New Gallery of the Romanian Institute for Culture and Humanistic Research in Venice. The Artist initially had intended "to base the project around a kind of interactive memory box, for which a selection of international artists were due to be invited to design an object referring to their Cold War experience of a divided Europe. This idea, however, proved financially and logistically difficult to achieve. Instead, Constantinescu and co-curator Xandra Popescu have selected existing works of art to exhibit in a group installation."

=== An Infinite Blue ===
An Infinite Blue is a recent series of 24 paintings created in a style that is reminiscent of Socialist Realism. The title of the work is taken from the popular Romanian pop song sung by Angela Similea. This series was conceived by using images from archives made available after the fall of Communism. Constantinescu participated in the fourth Bucharest Biennale with this series.

=== Troleibuzul 92 ===
In 2009, Constantinescu represented Romania at The Venice Biennale, with the films Passagen and Troleibuzul 92, which is an 8-minute film showing a man sitting down beside a female passenger on a trolleybus. Based on a witnessed incident, the realistic account reveals the man having a series of abusive phone calls with his wife, girlfriend or lover (who is on the opposite end of the line), filled with "cursing, accusations, and continuous threats of harm, even murder". As Chronicle Art Critic, Kenneth Baker puts it: the film shows the man "castigating her for making him jealous by being unreachable. He never raises his voice, but his reproaches quickly grow fierce to the point of obscenity... In the Eastern European setting of Constantinescu's piece, in the aftermath of generations under communist rule, uncertainty over the duties of citizenship must weigh heavily on individuals' minds." The surrounding passengers are visibly uncomfortable by these exclamations, yet nobody intervenes to stifle his threats - and in such "Constantinescu may be implying that they are accomplices."

=== The Golden Age for Children ===
The Golden Age for Children is an interactive pop-up book "complete with pull tabs and 3D archival photos jumping out from every page" featuring the artists’ biography intertwined with highlights from the grand narrative of Romania's past, and pays specific attention to the period of Ceausescu's regime - known as The Golden Age. The book, which is made in collaboration with the Swedish graphic designer Arina Stoenescu, creates a story which covers 20 years of Romanian contemporary history, beginning in 1968 (the year Stefan Constantinescu was born) and ends with the Revolution in 1989. For the reader of this children's book an uncanny quality emerges in the tension between the naïvety of the form and the dark surrealism of its content. Constantinescu created the work "in order to recount his experience – living under the regime of Ceausescu – to his son. In the process he encounters the challenge of telling the story and of passing on history to younger generations as he weaves text and photos from his own life with briefly stated historical facts in textbook form."

=== My Beautiful Dacia ===
My Beautiful Dacia is a light-hearted portrayal of Romania's evolution from Communism to Capitalism, told through the story of its most emblematic symbol, the Dacia automobile. The film, portrays different generations of Romanians – from the old and nostalgic to the young entrepreneurs – showing the present transformation of Romanian society. The connecting point between the different stories is the Dacia automobile: a symbol of the ambitious Communist technology and now a reflection of the new global economy. The film has had wide circulation in various Film Festivals. Created in 2009, “My Beautiful Dacia” was co-directed by Julio Sotto. After premiering at the Montréal World Film Festival, it went on to be awarded the second prize at the Documenta Madrid Festival (2010) and gaining wide circulation in film festivals across the globe.

=== Passagen ===
Passagen follows the uprooted lives of three Chileans who were forced to leave Chile in the aftermath of the coup d'état led by Augusto Pinochet in 1973. All three ended up living under Nicolae Ceaușescu’s dictatorship, and in time, two of them decided to emigrate to Sweden. Through the protagonists’ shared experiences, the film highlights touches on the distinct social structures of Chile, Romania and Sweden. Passagen together with Troleibuzul 92 and The Seductiveness of the Interval project, were the artworks Constantinescu showed at The Venice Biennale in 2009 representing Romania.

== Complete list of works ==
- Archive of Pain, video installation, book, 2000
- Just what is it, photography series, 2000
- The Baron, video, 45′, 2002
- Dacia 1300, my Generation, 2003
- Passagen, film, 62′, 2005
- Northern Light, photography series & text, 2006
- The Golden Age for Children, pop-up book, 2008
- My Beautiful Dacia, documentary film, 2009
- Troleibuzul 92, film, 8’, 2009
- The Flag, 2010
- An Infinite Blue, painting series, painting, 2009–2010

== Biography ==
The artist received his BA from Art University Bucharest in 1996 and his MA in 1998 from Royal Academy of Arts, Stockholm. Now he lives and works both Sweden and Romania.

Stefan Constantinescu first gained attention with his Project Archive of Pain shown in Vilnius and Bucharest. It dealt with the "confessions of Romanian political prisoners from 1945–65" He rose to fame by representing Romania in the Venice Biennale and the fourth Bucharest Biennale with his installation An Infinite Blue.

His work is in the collections of Fondation Louis-Vuitton pour la création, Moderna Museet, Museum of Contemporary Art, and the Malmö Museum of Contemporary Art. He has won the following prizes: 2010 Jury Award “Best International TV Documentary” for My Beautiful Dacia at The International Documentary Film Festival of Mexico City, Mexico and Second Prize, jury award for My Beautiful Dacia, Documenta Madrid, Spania.

=== Selection of group exhibitions ===
Periferic 8 – Art as Gift, the eight, Biennale for Contemporary Art, Iași, Romania, 2008

The Map: Navigating the Present, Bildmuseet, Umeå, Sweden, 2008

The Social Critique 1993–2005 at the Kalmar Konstmuseum in Kalmar, Sweden, 2009

Dada East? Romanian Context of Dadaism at the Zacheta National Gallery of Art in Warsaw, Poland 2008

indirect speech at the Kunsthalle Fridericianum in Kassel, Germany, 2006

All that remains ... Teenagers of Socialism at Waterside Project Space in London, United Kingdom, 2010,

Phoney Language at the no.w.here studio in London, United Kingdom, 2010,

Audience as a Subject at the Yerba Buena Center for the Arts in San Francisco, USA, 2010,

C.o.n.t.r.a.v.i.o.l.e.n.c.i.a.s. at the Koldo Mitxelena Kulturunea, San Sebastian, Spain, 2010,
