= Soldiers. Story from Ferentari =

2017 Romanian drama film

- Film poster
- Directed by: Ivana Mladenović
- Written by: Ivana Mladenović; Adrian Schiop
- Based on: Soldiers. Story from Ferentari by Adrian Schiop
- Produced by: Ada Solomon; Jelena Mitrovic; Cassandre Warnauts; Jean-Yves Roubin; Diana Paroiu; Valentino Rudolf; Christophe Hollebeke
- Starring: Adrian Schiop; Vasile Pavel-Digudai
- Release date: September 10, 2017 (Toronto International Film Festival)
- Running time: 119 minutes
- Country: Romania
- Language: Romanian
- Box office: $23,057

Soldiers. Story from Ferentari (original title in Romanian: Soldații. Poveste din Ferentari) is a 2017 Romanian drama film directed by Ivana Mladenović and based on the novel with the same title by Adrian Schiop.

== Storyline ==
The film tells the story of Adi (Schiop), an introverted anthropologist who moves into Ferentari, an ill-famed neighbourhood of Bucharest, to study for his PhD in manele music. After meeting Alberto (Vasile Pavel-Digudai), a Romani former convict who was sexually abused in prison, they begin a romantic relationship.

== Awards ==
For Soldiers. Story from Ferentari, Mladenović won Best Debut at the 2018 Gopo Awards; the film also received nominations for Best Actor (Vasile-Digudai) and Best Art Direction (Adrian Cristea).

== Cast ==
- Adrian Schiop as Adi
- Vasile Pavel as Alberto
- Ștefan Iancu as Andrei
- Nicolae Marin as Borcan
- Dan Bursuc as the Manager
- Kana Hashimoto as Brigitte
- Sorin Cocis as the Policeman
