= Copanatoyac =

City in the Mexican state of Guerrero

- Municipal seat and city
- Location in Mexico Copanatoyac (Mexico)
- Coordinates: 17°27′44.453″N 98°42′47.977″W
- Country: Mexico
- State: Guerrero
- Municipality: Copanatoyac
- Time zone: UTC-6 (Zona Centro)

Copanatoyac is a city and seat of the municipality of Copanatoyac, in the southern Mexican state of Guerrero.
