= Oh Lucy! (2017 film) =

Film by Atsuko Hirayanagi

- Theatrical release poster
- Directed by: Atsuko Hirayanagi
- Written by: Atsuko Hirayanagi; Boris Frumin
- Based on: Oh Lucy! by Atsuko Hirayanagi
- Produced by: Han West; Yukie Kito; Jessica Elbaum; Atsuko Hirayanagi
- Starring: Shinobu Terajima; Kaho Minami; Shioli Kutsuna; Kōji Yakusho; Josh Hartnett
- Cinematography: Paula Huidobro
- Edited by: Kate Hickey
- Music by: Erik Friedlander
- Production companies: Matchgirl Pictures; Gloria Sanchez Productions; Meridian Content; NHK
- Distributed by: Phantom Film (Japan); Film Movement (United States)
- Release dates: May 22, 2017 (Cannes); March 2, 2018 (United States); April 28, 2018 (Japan)
- Running time: 95 minutes
- Countries: United States; Japan
- Languages: English; Japanese
- Box office: $600,145

Oh Lucy! (オー・ルーシー!, Ō Rūshī!) is a 2017 comedy-drama film directed, produced, and co-written by Atsuko Hirayanagi, based on her 2014 short film. The film stars Shinobu Terajima, Kaho Minami, Shioli Kutsuna, Kōji Yakusho, and Josh Hartnett. It follows a lonely, middle-aged office drudge (Terajima) living in Tokyo who develops a crush on her English teacher (Hartnett) and decides to follow him to Los Angeles when he disappears. However, she ends up in the United States with her sister (Minami) and her niece (Kutsuna), as well as her English teacher.

The film premiered in the Critics' Week section of the 2017 Cannes Film Festival. It was released theatrically in the United States on March 2, 2018, by Film Movement and in Japan on April 28, 2018, by Phantom Film.

== Plot ==
Setsuko Kawashima is a lonely, middle-aged office worker in Tokyo who is aloof from her co-workers, lives in a cluttered studio apartment and is estranged from her sister, Ayako. One day, she meets with her niece Mika, who tells Setsuko that she signed up for a year of English classes but can no longer afford to attend, as she needs to save money and keep working. Mika persuades Setsuko to buy her out and sends her to the school for a free first class.

At the school, Setsuko meets John, an American teacher who hugs her warmly, gives her the American name of Lucy and a bright blonde wig so she can adopt an American persona. She meets Takeshi Komori, a classmate in the English class who goes by the name Tom. Setsuko is quickly charmed by John and decides to continue attending classes. At their next session, she learns that John has abruptly quit to return to the United States. Outside the school, she spots John and Mika kissing and getting into a cab. Ayako informs her that Mika has moved to the US.

Setsuko returns to English class, but finds the new teacher too conventional and leaves the school. When she receives a postcard from Mika containing her address in Los Angeles, Setsuko impulsively decides to follow her, with Ayako insisting on joining her, despite her strained relationship with her daughter Mika. It is revealed that Setsuko harbors resentment towards Ayako for stealing and marrying her boyfriend.

Arriving in Los Angeles, the two are surprised to find only John at home, who claims that Mika has left him and he has no idea where she is. After raiding his room, however, Ayako discovers a postcard sent by Mika from a motel in San Diego. The sisters have John rent a car and drive them to the motel where Mika was last heard from.

While waiting for Mika to reappear, John offers to teach Setsuko how to drive and the two end up having sex. Later that night, Setsuko goes to a tattoo parlor to get the same tattoo as John, but when she shows it to him, he rebuffs her. The next morning, Ayako confronts John and tells him to take her to Mika. He goes to his house where he introduces Ayako to his estranged wife and daughter, who know where Mika is but will not tell him.

Setsuko, left alone at the motel, runs into Mika who tells her that she broke up with John after discovering his family. They have a picnic near the beach where Mika teases Setsuko about having a crush on John, and Setsuko responds by revealing that she had sex with John. The two women engage in a physical altercation, culminating in Mika jumping off a cliff in a suicide attempt, but she survives. At the hospital, an enraged John asks Setsuko if she told Mika about them. She insists that she loves John, but he rejects her and drives off. Ayako tells her to stay out of their lives.

Back in Tokyo, Setsuko learns she is being transferred to another department, prompting her to quit. Shortly after leaving the office, she overhears her co-workers laughing and cheering. Distraught over losing John, her job, and her family, she attempts suicide by overdosing on pills at home. She is found by Takeshi, who makes her vomit the pills. She tries to seduce him, but he kindly rejects her advances. As they head to a subway station, Takeshi reveals that his son killed himself and that he blames himself for being too strict, which is why he enjoys slipping into his Tom persona. He asks Setsuko for a hug, and she agrees.

== Cast ==
- Shinobu Terajima as Setsuko Kawashima / Lucy, a Tokyo office worker
- Kaho Minami as Ayako Kawashima, Setsuko's sister and Mika's mother
- Shioli Kutsuna as Mika Ogawa, Setsuko's niece who is in a relationship with John
- Kōji Yakusho as Takeshi Komori / Tom, a security consultant taking English lessons
- Josh Hartnett as John Woodruff, an English teacher in Tokyo
- Miyu Yagyu as young office lady 1
- Kayano as young office lady 2
- Miyoko Yamaguchi as Yoshiko
- Hajime Inoue as Setsuko's boss
- Suzuka Ohgo as Sakura
- Megan Mullally as Hannah
- Eddie Hassell as waiter
- Tre Hale as tattoo guy
- Noelani Dacascos as Samantha, John and Kei's daughter
- Reiko Aylesworth as Kei, John's wife and Samantha's mother

== Production ==
The film was adapted from Hirayanagi's 2014 short film of the same title. The short film's success helped take the script for the feature to Gloria Sanchez Productions.

Hirayanagi worked on the screenplay for the film at the Noe Valley Branch Library after dropping off her kids at school. Cathay Organisation CEO Meileen Choo funded the film. Hirayanagi has said that it cost less than $1 million to make.

Filming concluded in December 2016.

== Reception ==
On the review aggregator website Rotten Tomatoes, 98% of 55 critics' reviews are positive, with an average rating of 7.1/10. The website's consensus reads: "Oh Lucy! roots its narrative quirks in universal themes and deep empathy for its characters, all brought to life by strong performances from a talented cast led by the thoroughly charming Shinobu Terajima." Metacritic, which uses a weighted average, assigned the film a score of 69 out of 100, based on 18 critics, indicating "generally favorable" reviews.

Film critic Manohla Dargis for The New York Times praised the film, in particular Shinobu Terajima's performance, and described it as "by turns tender, plaintive, heartfelt, and joyful".

Terajima's performance was praised by critics, as well as Hirayanagi's "smart" and "sincere" script and direction. A common criticism of the film was the "familiar" indie-drama beats of the second half.
