= Atsuko Hirayanagi =

Japanese-American filmmaker

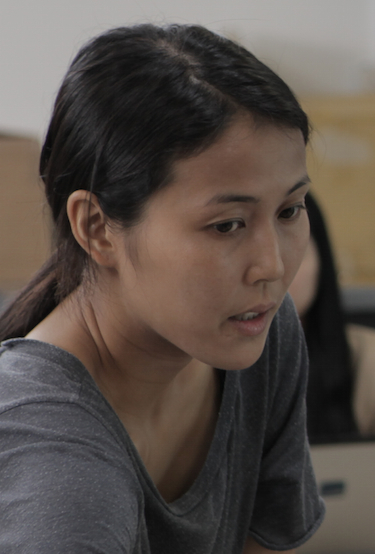
- Born: Nagano, Japan
- Education: NYU, Tisch School of the Arts
- Occupations: Writer, director

Atsuko Hirayanagi (平栁 敦子, Hirayanagi Atsuko) is a Japanese-American filmmaker.

== Early life ==
Born in Nagano to schoolteachers and raised in Chiba, Japan, Hirayanagi moved to the Los Angeles area in the early 1990s as a high school exchange student.

She graduated from San Francisco State University with a BA in theater arts. She went on to attend NYU Tisch School of the Arts and graduated with a MFA in film production.

== Career ==
While in graduate school, her second year project, Mo Ikkai, won the Grand Prix at the 2012 Short Shorts Film Festival in Asia.

Her thesis short film, Oh Lucy!, received a Tisch's First Prize Wasserman Award at the 2014 First Run Festival, and also won more than 25 awards around the globe, including prizes at Cannes Film Festival (2014), Sundance Film Festival (2015), and the Toronto International Film Festival (2014).

Her feature-length version of Oh Lucy! was a recipient of the 2016 Sundance/NHK Award. On June 14, 2017, she was named one of the ″20 Rising Women Directors You Need to Know″ by IndieWire., and was nominated at the 2018 Film Independent Spirit Awards for Best First Feature. The project was funded by Cathay Organisation CEO Meileen Cho.

Hirayanagi was invited to join the Academy of Motion Picture Arts and Sciences in 2018.

On April 29, 2021, Hirayanagi was set to direct the film adaptation of A. Lee Martinez’s novel The Last Adventure of Constance Verity for Legendary Entertainment with Awkwafina set to star.

In March 2022, it was announced that Hirayanagi would serve as showrunner of the Amazon Prime Video original series Modern Love Tokyo.

== Personal life ==
Hirayanagi is a black belt in Kyokushin Karate, and came in 3rd place in the Los Angeles Cup Women's Category.

Atsuko currently resides in Noe Valley, San Francisco, CA.
