= Critics' Week =

Parallel section of the Cannes Film Festival

- Location: Cannes, France
- Founded: 1962
- Awards: Grand Prize
- Website: www.semainedelacritique.com

Critics' Week (French: Semaine de la critique), until 2008 called International Critics' Week (Semaine internationale de la critique), is a parallel section to the Cannes Film Festival organized by the French Syndicate of Cinema Critics.

== History ==
Critics' week was created in 1962, after the French Syndicate of Cinema Critics' successful campaign for Shirley Clarke's The Connection to be screened at the 1961 Cannes Film Festival. It is the oldest non-official Cannes sidebar.

Critics' Week's objective is to discover and support new talents, showcasing first and second feature films by directors worldwide. Bernardo Bertolucci, Philip Kaufman, Ken Loach, Tony Scott, Agnieszka Holland, Leos Carax, Wong Kar-wai, Guillermo del Toro, Jacques Audiard, Arnaud Desplechin, Gaspar Noé, François Ozon, Andrea Arnold, Alejandro González Iñárritu, Julia Ducournau, Justine Triet, all began at Critics' Week.

Since its creation in 1990 and until 2010, there was no jury at Critics' Week. Journalists of all nationalities were invited to vote at the end of each screening of the films in competition, after which the Grand Prize was awarded. In 2011, on the occasion of its 50th edition, Critics' Week formed an international jury made up of four critics and chaired by Korean filmmaker Lee Chang-dong. Thereafter, the jury has been presided over by a director and consists of four members with writing, filmmaking, acting or programming backgrounds. Notable jury presidents have included Bertrand Bonello, Miguel Gomes, Andrea Arnold, Ronit Elkabetz, Valérie Donzelli, Kleber Mendonça Filho, Joachim Trier, Ciro Guerra and Cristian Mungiu.

== Description ==
Critics' Week presents a selective program of seven feature films and ten short films in competition. There are also special screenings which are kept few in number in order to provide them greater visibility. Feature films compete for Grand Prize, the SACD Prize, which is awarded for best screenplay, and the Gan Foundation Award, which helps films get distribution. Short films can receive the Canal+ Award and the Discovery Award. Debut feature films are eligible for the Caméra d'Or, which is open to all first films in Official Selection and the parallel sections at Cannes.

== Main awards ==
=== Feature films ===
Feature film awards include:

- Grand Prize (Grand Prix)
- Rising Star Award (Prix Fondation Louis Roederer de la Révélation)
- Award for Distribution (Prix Fondation Gan à la Diffusion)
- SACD (Société des Auteurs et Compositeurs Dramatiques) (Prix SACD)

=== Short films ===
Short film awards include:

- Canal+ Award for Short Film (Prix Canal+)
- Discovery Prize for Short Film (Prix Découverte Sony)

=== Discontinued awards ===
- Prize of the Jury (Prix French Touch du jury) (?–2025)
- Visionary Award (Prix Révélation France 4) (2012–2017)

== Grand Prize winners ==
The Grand Prize (Grand Prix) is the top prize of Critics' Week. In 2001, the prize was sponsored by the French energy company Primagaz. Between 2011 and 2021, the Grand Prize was known as the Nespresso Grand Prize, named for its sponsor Nespresso. Since 2025, its officially named AMI Paris Grand Prize.

Below is a list of films and filmmakers that won the award, and the respective edition:

Year	English title	Original title	Director(s)	Production country	Ref.
2001	Under the Moonlight	زیر نور ماه	Reza Mirkarimi	Iran	
2002	Respiro		Emanuele Crialese	Italy, France	
2003	Since Otar Left	Depuis qu'Otar est parti...	Julie Bertuccelli	France, Belgium	
2004	A Common Thread	Brodeuses	Éléonore Faucher	France	
2004	Or (My Treasure)	אור	Keren Yedaya	France, Israel	
2005	Me and You and Everyone We Know		Miranda July	United States	
2006	Poison Friends	Les Amitiés maléfiques	Emmanuel Bourdieu	France	
2007	XXY		Lucía Puenzo	Argentina, Spain, France	
2008	Snow	Snijeg	Aida Begić	Bosnia and Herzegovina, Germany, France, Iran	
2009	Adieu Gary		Nassim Amaouche	France	
2010	Armadillo		Janus Metz Pedersen	Denmark	
2011	Take Shelter		Jeff Nichols	United States	
2012	Here and There	Aquí y allá	Antonio Méndez Esparza	Spain, United States, Mexico	
2013	Salvo		Fabio Grassadonia and Antonio Piazza	Italy, France	
2014	The Tribe	Плем'я	Myroslav Slaboshpytskyi	Ukraine	
2015	Paulina	La patota	Santiago Mitre	Argentina, Brazil, France	
2016	Mimosas		Oliver Laxe	Spain, Morocco, Franace, Qatar	
2017	Makala		Emmanuel Gras	France	
2018	Diamantino		Gabriel Abrantes and Daniel Schmidt	Portugal, France, Brazil	
2019	I Lost My Body	J'ai perdu mon corps	Jérémy Clapin	France	
2021	Feathers	ريش	Omar El Zohairy	France, Egypt, Netherlands, Greece	
2022	The Pack	La jauría	Andrés Ramirez Pulido	Colombia, France	
2023	Tiger Stripes		Amanda Nell Eu	Malaysia, Taiwan, Singapore, France, Germany, Netherlands, Indonesia, Qatar	
2024	Simon of the Mountain	Simon de la montaña	Federico Luis	Argentina, Chile, Uruguay	
2025	A Useful Ghost	ผีใช้ได้ค่ะ	Ratchapoom Boonbunchachoke	Thailand, France, Germany, Singapore	
2026	La Gradiva		Marine Atlan	France, Italy	

== See also ==
- Directors' Fortnight
- ACID
